= Josh Richeson =

American racing driver

- Born: Joshua Richeson; September 4, 1981 (age 45); Troutman, North Carolina, U.S.

NASCAR O'Reilly Auto Parts Series career
- 24 races run over 5 years
- Best finish: 57th (2002)
- First race: 2001 Emerson Radio 250 (Richmond)
- Last race: 2006 Busch Silver Celebration 250 (Gateway)
Wins	Top tens	Poles
0	0	0

NASCAR FedEx Freight Truck Series career
- 1 race run over 1 year
- Best finish: 97th (2004)
- First race: 2004 Darlington 200 (Darlington)
Wins	Top tens	Poles
0	0	0
- Statistics up to date as of July 29, 2020.

Joshua Richeson (born September 4, 1981) is an American stock car racing driver. He has made 24 career starts in the NASCAR Busch Series (now O'Reilly Auto Parts Series), one start in the Truck Series, and five in the ARCA Racing Series. He is the nephew of former NASCAR Cup Series driver Brett Bodine.

== Racing career ==
Richeson made his Nationwide Series debut at Richmond International Raceway in September 2001. He drove the No. 06 Bodine Racing Ford Taurus into the field with a 33rd place qualifying effort, but was involved with a crash on lap 72 and finished 40th.

Bodine put together some sponsorship deals from Smucker's and Timberland to put Richeson in the car for seven races in 2002. He ran better at Daytona, starting 25th and finishing 30th. In these seven events, his best finish was only 28th place, at Rockingham Motor Speedway.

Other than driving his uncle's car, Richeson ran for other teams in 2001 and 2002. But after being released from Bodine Racing, Richeson found only one-race deals for the next few years.

In 2002 and 2003, Richeson drove eight races for the Havill-Spoerl team in car No. 67. However, the team struggled, and Richeson did not finish any races. His best finish was a 35th at Memphis, but he did record his career-best start of 19th at Pikes Peak International Raceway.

In 2004, Richeson twice recorded his best career finish of 27th, first at Daytona driving the No. 43 for Curb Agajanian Performance Group and later at Gateway in the No. 49 Advil Ford (for the injured Derrike Cope). He drove for Jay Robinson Racing's No. 28 team at Milwaukee, finishing 40th. He drove in the No. 97 AmericInn Chevy at New Hampshire, finishing 42nd.

In 2004, Richeson drove the Curb-Agajanian Craftsman Truck Series truck. Josh started the race at Darlington in 36th, the last truck in the field, but drove to a 25th-place finish. In 2006, he returned to the Busch Series, driving the No. 28 Ford for Jay Robinson at Gateway International Raceway.

In 2019, Richeson found himself back behind the driver's seat. He began driving for legendary chassis builder Billy Hess. Hess had found success as a chassis builder and was branching out from pavement cars to dirt late models. Richeson won several late model races in the 2019 season. He currently participates in regional super late model racing throughout the southeast. He is also building his own late model chassis in conjunction with Justin Shaw, the grandson of the late C.J. Rayburn.

== Personal life ==
Richeson has been a vegetarian since 2017.

== Motorsports career results ==
=== NASCAR ===
(key) (Bold – Pole position awarded by qualifying time. Italics – Pole position earned by points standings or practice time. * – Most laps led.)

==== Busch Series ====
NASCAR Busch Series results
Year	Team	No.	Make	1	2	3	4	5	6	7	8	9	10	11	12	13	14	15	16	17	18	19	20	21	22	23	24	25	26	27	28	29	30	31	32	33	34	35	NBSC	Pts	Ref
2001	Brett Bodine Racing	6	Ford	DAY	CAR	LVS	ATL	DAR	BRI	TEX	NSH	TAL	CAL	RCH	NHA	NZH	CLT	DOV	KEN	MLW	GLN	CHI	GTY	PPR	IRP	MCH	BRI	DAR	RCH; 40	DOV	KAN	CLT; DNQ	MEM	PHO					105th	95	
2001	HighLine Performance Group	8	Chevy																																CAR; 37	HOM			105th	95	
2002	Brett Bodine Racing	11	Ford	DAY	CAR; 30	LVS	DAR	BRI	TEX	NSH	TAL	CAL	RCH; 41	NHA	NZH	CLT; 43	DOV	NSH	KEN	MLW	DAY	CHI					BRI; DNQ	DAR	RCH; DNQ	DOV; 33	KAN	CLT; 35	MEM	ATL; 35	CAR; 28	PHO	HOM		57th	495	
2002	Havill-Spoerl Racing	85	Ford																				GTY; 41	PPR; 38	IRP	MCH													57th	495	
2003	Schuler Racing	67	Ford	DAY	CAR	LVS	DAR	BRI	TEX	TAL	NSH	CAL; 28	RCH	GTY; 41	NZH	CLT	DOV	NSH	KEN	MLW	DAY		NHA; 40	PPR	IRP; 42	MCH	BRI	DAR	RCH	DOV	KAN; 39	CLT	MEM; 35	ATL; 42	PHO; DNQ	CAR; DNQ	HOM		79th	316	
2003	Ortec Racing	96	Ford																			CHI; 40																	79th	316	
2004	Curb Agajanian Motorsports	43	Chevy	DAY; 27	CAR	LVS	DAR	BRI	TEX	NSH	TAL	CAL																											84th	244	
2004	Jay Robinson Racing	49	Ford										GTY; 27	RCH	NZH	CLT	DOV	NSH	KEN																				84th	244	
2004	Jay Robinson Racing	28	Ford																	MLW; 40	DAY	CHI																	84th	244	
2004	Stanton Barrett Motorsports	97	Chevy																				NHA; 42	PPR	IRP	MCH	BRI	CAL	RCH	DOV	KAN	CLT	MEM	ATL	PHO	DAR	HOM		84th	244	
2006	Jay Robinson Racing	28	Chevy	DAY	CAL	MXC	LVS	ATL	BRI	TEX	NSH	PHO	TAL	RCH	DAR	CLT	DOV	NSH	KEN	MLW	DAY	CHI	NHA	MAR	GTY; 43	IRP	GLN	MCH	BRI	CAL	RCH	DOV	KAN	CLT	MEM	TEX	PHO	HOM	148th	34	

==== Craftsman Truck Series ====
NASCAR Craftsman Truck Series results
Year	Team	No.	Make	1	2	3	4	5	6	7	8	9	10	11	12	13	14	15	16	17	18	19	20	21	22	23	24	25	NCTC	Pts	Ref
2004	Edge Performance Group	43	Ford	DAY	ATL	MAR	MFD	CLT	DOV	TEX	MEM	MLW	KAN	KEN	GTW	MCH	IRP	NSH	BRI	RCH	NHA	LVS	CAL	TEX	MAR	PHO	DAR; 25	HOM	97th	88	

=== ARCA Re/Max Series ===
(key) (Bold – Pole position awarded by qualifying time. Italics – Pole position earned by points standings or practice time. * – Most laps led.)

ARCA Re/Max Series results
Year	Team	No.	Make	1	2	3	4	5	6	7	8	9	10	11	12	13	14	15	16	17	18	19	20	21	22	23	24	25	ARMC	Pts	Ref
2001	LJ Racing	91	Chevy	DAY	NSH	WIN	SLM	GTY	KEN	CLT; 19	KAN	MCH																	83rd	385	
2001	Brett Bodine Racing	14	Ford										POC; 2	MEM	GLN	KEN	MCH	POC; DNS	NSH	ISF	CHI	DSF	SLM	TOL	BLN	CLT	TAL	ATL	83rd	385	
2004	J&J Motorsports	70	Chevy	DAY	NSH	SLM	KEN	TOL	CLT	KAN	POC	MCH	SBO	BLN	KEN	GTW	POC	LER	NSH	ISF	**TOL**; 24*	DSF	CHI	SLM; 29	TAL				100th	230	
2005	Ken Schrader Racing	99	Chevy	DAY	NSH	SLM; QL^{†}	KEN	TOL	LAN																				122nd	150	
2005	Henriksen Racing	17	Pontiac							MIL; 14	POC	MCH	KAN	KEN	BLN	POC	GTW	LER	NSH	MCH	ISF	TOL	DSF	CHI	SLM	TAL			122nd	150	
2006	Ken Schrader Racing	99	Chevy	DAY	NSH	SLM; QL^{†}	WIN	KEN	TOL; QL^{†}	POC	MCH	KAN	KEN	BLN	POC	GTW	NSH	MCH	ISF	MIL	TOL	DSF	CHI	SLM	TAL	IOW			N/A	0	
^{†} - Qualified for Ken Schrader
