= Nick Woodward =

American NASCAR driver

- Born: November 29, 1979 (age 46); Preston, Maryland, U.S.
- Achievements: 2000 NASCAR Weekly Racing Series Atlantic Seaboard champion 2000 South Boston Speedway track champion 2000 Southampton Speedway track champion
- Awards: 1997 Old Dominion Speedway Rookie of the Year

NASCAR O'Reilly Auto Parts Series career
- 2 races run over 1 year
- 2002 position: 89th
- Best finish: 89th (2002)
- First race: 2002 MBNA Platinum 200 (Dover)
- Last race: 2002 GNC Live Well 250 (Milwaukee)
Wins	Top tens	Poles
0	0	0

NASCAR FedEx Freight Truck Series career
- 3 races run over 2 years
- 2003 position: 96th
- Best finish: 69th (2001)
- First race: 2001 Power Stroke Diesel 200 (IRP)
- Last race: 2003 John Boy & Billy 250 (South Boston)
Wins	Top tens	Poles
0	0	0

Nick Woodward (born November 29, 1979) is an American former stock car racing driver. He competed in the NASCAR Busch Series and NASCAR Craftsman Truck Series. He currently works as the graphics manager for Richard Childress Racing.

== Racing career ==
Woodward's racing career started at the age of eight, racing go-karts and dwarf cars. Woodward won three Virginia state go-kart championships and one national go-kart championship. He later raced both dirt and pavement late models, running at Hagerstown Speedway and Old Dominion Speedway. In 2000, Woodward won five consecutive late model races at Southampton Motor Speedway, and won fourteen races on the season. He also won five late model races at South Boston Speedway. On the strength of that season, Woodward won the 2000 Atlantic Seaboard championship for the late model portion of the NASCAR Weekly Racing Series.

=== NASCAR ===
Woodward made two Craftsman Truck Series starts in 2001, both resulting in top-twenty finishes for Long Brothers Racing.

In May 2002, Woodward made his Busch Series debut at Dover International Speedway, driving the No. 49 for Jay Robinson Racing. He also tested a Craftsman Truck for Roush Racing in 2002.

Woodward returned to the Truck Series in 2003 for one more race with Long Brothers Racing.

== Personal life ==
Woodward is a graduate of Colonel Richardson High School and High Point University. After his racing career ended, Woodward now works for Richard Childress Racing as the team's graphics manager. He is married.

== Motorsports career results ==
=== NASCAR ===
==== Busch Series ====
NASCAR Busch Series results
Year	Team	No.	Make	1	2	3	4	5	6	7	8	9	10	11	12	13	14	15	16	17	18	19	20	21	22	23	24	25	26	27	28	29	30	31	32	33	34	NBSC	Pts	Ref
2002	Jay Robinson Racing	49	Ford	DAY	CAR	LVS	DAR	BRI	TEX	NSH	TAL	CAL	RCH	NHA	NZH	CLT	DOV; 30			MLW; 31	DAY	CHI	GTY	PPR	IRP	MCH	BRI	DAR	RCH	DOV	KAN	CLT	MEM	ATL	CAR	PHO	HOM	89th	143	
2002	Daryl Spoerl	85	Ford															NSH; DNQ	KEN																			89th	143	

==== Craftsman Truck Series ====
NASCAR Craftsman Truck Series results
Year	Team	No.	Make	1	2	3	4	5	6	7	8	9	10	11	12	13	14	15	16	17	18	19	20	21	22	23	24	25	NCTC	Pts	Ref
2001	Long Brothers Racing	84	Ford	DAY	HOM	MMR	MAR	GTY	DAR	PPR	DOV	TEX	MEM	MLW	KAN	KEN	NHA	IRP; 11	NSH	CIC	NZH	RCH	SBO; 19	TEX	LVS	PHO	CAL		69th	236	
2003	Long Brothers Racing	84	Ford	DAY	DAR	MMR	MAR	CLT	DOV	TEX	MEM	MLW	KAN	KEN	GTW	MCH	IRP	NSH	BRI	RCH	NHA	CAL	LVS	SBO; 14	TEX	MAR	PHO	HOM	96th	121	
