= Sammy Potashnick =

American racing driver (born 1974)

- Born: June 3, 1974 (age 52); Sikeston, Missouri, U.S.

NASCAR O'Reilly Auto Parts Series career
- 1 race run over 1 year
- Best finish: 109th (2002)
- First race: 2002 Charter Pipeline 250 (Gateway)
| Wins | Top tens | Poles |
|---|---|---|
| 0 | 0 | 0 |

NASCAR FedEx Freight Truck Series career
- 2 races run over 1 year
- Best finish: 75th (1998)
- First race: 1998 Memphis 200 (Memphis)
- Last race: 1998 Sam's Town 250 (Las Vegas)
| Wins | Top tens | Poles |
|---|---|---|
| 0 | 0 | 0 |

ARCA Menards Series career
- 16 races run over 6 years
- Best finish: 90th (1999)
- First race: 1996 AC Delco 200 (Pensacola)
- Last race: 2001 BPU 200 (Kansas)
| Wins | Top tens | Poles |
|---|---|---|
| 0 | 2 | 0 |
- Statistics up to date as of November 20, 2024.

Sammy Potashnick (born June 3, 1974) is an American former professional stock car racing driver who has previously competed in the NASCAR Busch Series, the NASCAR Craftsman Truck Series, the ARCA Re/Max Series, and the NASCAR Winston West Series.

Potashnick has also competed in the ASA National Tour, the Hooters Pro Cup Series, the ASA CRA Super Series, and the Crate Racin' USA Weekly Racing Series.

== Motorsports career results ==
=== NASCAR ===
(key) (Bold - Pole position awarded by qualifying time. Italics - Pole position earned by points standings or practice time. * – Most laps led.)

==== Busch Series ====
NASCAR Busch Series results
| Year | Team | No. | Make | 1 | 2 | 3 | 4 | 5 | 6 | 7 | 8 | 9 | 10 | 11 | 12 | 13 | 14 | 15 | 16 | 17 | 18 | 19 | 20 | 21 | 22 | 23 | 24 | 25 | 26 | 27 | 28 | 29 | 30 | 31 | 32 | 33 | 34 | NBSC | Pts | Ref |
|---|---|---|---|---|---|---|---|---|---|---|---|---|---|---|---|---|---|---|---|---|---|---|---|---|---|---|---|---|---|---|---|---|---|---|---|---|---|---|---|---|
| 2002 | Jay Robinson Racing | 49 | Ford | DAY | CAR | LVS | DAR | BRI | TEX | NSH | TAL | CAL | RCH | NHA | NZH | CLT | DOV | NSH | KEN | MLW | DAY | CHI | GTY; 30 | PPR | IRP | MCH | BRI | DAR | RCH | DOV | KAN | CLT | MEM | ATL | CAR | PHO | HOM | 109th | 73 | |

==== Craftsman Truck Series ====
NASCAR Craftsman Truck Series results
| Year | Team | No. | Make | 1 | 2 | 3 | 4 | 5 | 6 | 7 | 8 | 9 | 10 | 11 | 12 | 13 | 14 | 15 | 16 | 17 | 18 | 19 | 20 | 21 | 22 | 23 | 24 | 25 | 26 | 27 | NCTC | Pts | Ref |
|---|---|---|---|---|---|---|---|---|---|---|---|---|---|---|---|---|---|---|---|---|---|---|---|---|---|---|---|---|---|---|---|---|---|
| 1998 | Potashnick Racing | 08 | Chevy | WDW | HOM | PHO | POR | EVG | I70 | GLN | TEX | BRI | MLW | NZH | CAL | PPR | IRP | NHA | FLM | NSV | HPT | LVL | RCH | MEM; 26 | GTY | MAR | SON | MMR | PHO | LVS; 31 | 75th | 155 | |

=== ARCA Re/Max Series ===
(key) (Bold – Pole position awarded by qualifying time. Italics – Pole position earned by points standings or practice time. * – Most laps led. ** – All laps led.)

ARCA Re/Max Series results
| Year | Team | No. | Make | 1 | 2 | 3 | 4 | 5 | 6 | 7 | 8 | 9 | 10 | 11 | 12 | 13 | 14 | 15 | 16 | 17 | 18 | 19 | 20 | 21 | 22 | 23 | 24 | 25 | ARMSC | Pts | Ref |
|---|---|---|---|---|---|---|---|---|---|---|---|---|---|---|---|---|---|---|---|---|---|---|---|---|---|---|---|---|---|---|---|
| 1996 | Potashnick Racing | 51 | Chevy | DAY | ATL | SLM | TAL | FIF; 19 | LVL | CLT | CLT | KIL | FRS | POC | MCH | | | | | | | | | | | | | | N/A | 0 | |
| 1996 | Potashnick Racing | 65 | Chevy | | | | | | | | | | | | | FRS; 22 | | POC; 13 | MCH | INF | SBS | ISF | DSF | KIL | SLM | WIN | CLT; 37 | | N/A | 0 | |
| 1996 | Potashnick Racing | 66 | Chevy | | | | | | | | | | | | | | TOL; 12 | | | | | | | | | | | | N/A | 0 | |
| 1996 | Potashnick Racing | 65 | Olds | | | | | | | | | | | | | | | | | | | | | | | | | ATL; 19 | N/A | 0 | |
| 1997 | Potashnick Racing | 65 | Chevy | DAY | ATL | SLM | CLT; 28 | CLT; 34 | POC | MCH | SBS | TOL | KIL | FRS | MIN | POC | MCH | DSF | GTW; 25 | SLM | WIN | CLT; 14 | TAL | ISF | ATL | | | | N/A | 0 | |
| 1998 | Potashnick Racing | 65 | Chevy | DAY; DNQ | ATL; 10 | SLM | CLT; 36 | MEM; 32 | MCH | POC | SBS | TOL | PPR | POC | KIL | FRS | ISF | ATL; 35 | DSF | SLM | TEX | WIN | CLT | TAL | ATL | | | | N/A | 0 | |
| 1999 | Potashnick Racing | 65 | Chevy | DAY | ATL | SLM | AND | CLT; 7 | MCH | POC | TOL | SBS | BLN | POC | KIL | FRS | FLM | ISF | WIN | DSF | SLM | CLT | TAL | ATL | | | | | 90th | 195 | |
| 2001 | Venturini Motorsports | 25 | Chevy | DAY | NSH | WIN | SLM | GTY | KEN | CLT | KAN; 26 | MCH | POC | MEM | GLN | KEN | MCH | POC | NSH | ISF | CHI | DSF | SLM | TOL | BLN | CLT | TAL | ATL | 161st | 100 | |
| 2002 | N/A | 65 | Chevy | DAY | ATL | NSH | SLM | KEN | CLT; DNQ | KAN | POC | MCH | TOL | SBO | KEN | BLN | POC | NSH | ISF | WIN | DSF | CHI | SLM | TAL | CLT | | | | N/A | 0 | |
