= Ron Young (racing driver) =

American racing driver

- Nationality: (United States) American
- Born: Ronald Young; July 22, 1970 (age 56) Conyers, Georgia

Previous series
- 1991–2000 2007: NASCAR Southeast Series; ARCA Re/Max Series

NASCAR O'Reilly Auto Parts Series career
- 37 races run over 9 years
- Best finish: 42nd (2003)
- First race: 2000 Miami 300 (Homestead)
- Last race: 2008 Kroger On Track for the Cure 250 (Memphis)
Wins	Top tens	Poles
0	0	0
- Statistics up to date as of June 10, 2020.

Ronald Young (born July 22, 1970) is an American professional stock car racing driver who raced part-time in the NASCAR Nationwide Series from 1999 to 2008, mostly in his family team's No. 71 Chevrolet. He also competed in the NASCAR Southeast Series for a decade where he won six races and finished as high as third in points. Additionally, in 2007, Young drove in an ARCA Re/Max Series race at Nashville, his one and only start in that series.

The only year that Young did not make any Busch Series starts was in 2004, which was because his hauler was stolen just before the start of the season. They had planned to run 15 races beginning at Rockingham, but ended up running none at all before returning in 2005.

== Motorsports career results ==
=== NASCAR ===
(key) (Bold – Pole position awarded by qualifying time. Italics – Pole position earned by points standings or practice time. * – Most laps led.)

==== Nationwide Series ====
NASCAR Nationwide Series results
Year	Team	No.	Make	1	2	3	4	5	6	7	8	9	10	11	12	13	14	15	16	17	18	19	20	21	22	23	24	25	26	27	28	29	30	31	32	33	34	35	NNSC	Pts	Ref
1999	Young Racing	71	Chevy	DAY	CAR	LVS	ATL	DAR	TEX	NSV	BRI	TAL	CAL	NHA	RCH	NZH	CLT	DOV	SBO	GLN	MLW	MYB	PPR	GTY	IRP	MCH	BRI	DAR	RCH	DOV	CLT	CAR	MEM; DNQ	PHO	HOM; DNQ				N/A	0	
2000	Young Racing	70	Chevy	DAY	CAR	LVS	ATL; DNQ	DAR	BRI	TEX																	BRI; DNQ	DAR	RCH	DOV	CLT	CAR	MEM; DNQ	PHO	HOM; 34				104th	61	
2000	Young Racing	71	Chevy								NSV; DNQ	TAL	CAL	RCH	NHA	CLT	DOV	SBO	MYB	GLN	MLW	NZH	PPR	GTY	IRP	MCH													104th	61	
2001	Young Racing	70	Chevy	DAY	CAR	LVS	ATL	DAR; 38																			BRI; DNQ	DAR											86th	174	
2001	Young Racing	71	Chevy						BRI; 42	TEX	NSH	TAL	CAL	RCH	NHA	NZH	CLT	DOV	KEN	MLW	GLN	CHI	GTY	PPR	IRP	MCH			RCH; DNQ	DOV	KAN	CLT	MEM; 25	PHO	CAR	HOM; DNQ			86th	174	
2002	Young Racing	71	Chevy	DAY	CAR	LVS	DAR	BRI	TEX	NSH	TAL	CAL	RCH; DNQ	NHA	NZH; 17	CLT	DOV	NSH; 38	KEN	MLW; 21	DAY	CHI	GTY; 14	PPR	IRP; 28	MCH	BRI; DNQ	DAR; DNQ	RCH; DNQ										45th	945	
2002	Hensley Motorsports	63	Chevy																											DOV; 32	KAN; 40	CLT; 24	MEM; 25	ATL; 29	CAR; 37	PHO			45th	945	
2002	Young Racing	70	Chevy																																		HOM; 32		45th	945	
2003	Young Racing	71	Chevy	DAY	CAR; 21	LVS; 30	DAR; 20	BRI; 20	TEX	TAL	NSH; 20	CAL	RCH	GTY; 18	NZH; 33	CLT	DOV	NSH; 22	KEN; 20	MLW	DAY	CHI	NHA	PPR	IRP	MCH	BRI	DAR; 21	RCH	DOV	KAN; DNQ	CLT	MEM; 14	ATL; 32	PHO	CAR; 35	HOM		42nd	1201	
2005	RB1 Motorsports	71	Chevy	DAY	CAL	MXC	LVS	ATL	NSH	BRI	TEX	PHO	TAL	DAR	RCH	CLT	DOV	NSH	KEN	MLW	DAY	CHI	NHA	PPR	GTY; 19	IRP	GLN	MCH	BRI; DNQ	CAL	RCH	DOV	KAN	CLT	MEM; 36	TEX	PHO	HOM	98th	161	
2006	RB1 Motorsports	71	Chevy	DAY	CAL	MXC	LVS	ATL	BRI	TEX	NSH	PHO	TAL; 42	RCH	DAR	CLT	DOV	NSH	KEN	MLW	DAY	CHI	NHA	MAR; 40	GTY; 32	IRP	GLN	MCH	BRI	CAL	RCH	DOV	KAN	CLT	MEM; DNQ	TEX	PHO	HOM	110th	110	
2007	RB1 Motorsports	71	Chevy	DAY	CAL	MXC	LVS	ATL; 32	BRI	NSH	TEX	PHO	TAL	RCH	DAR; 29	CLT	DOV	NSH	KEN	MLW	NHA	DAY	CHI	GTY	IRP	CGV	GLN	MCH; DNQ	BRI	CAL	RCH	DOV	KAN	CLT	MEM; 17	TEX	PHO	HOM	103rd	210	
2008	RB1 Motorsports	71	Chevy	DAY	CAL	LVS	ATL	BRI	NSH	TEX	PHO	MXC	TAL	RCH	DAR	CLT	DOV	NSH	KEN	MLW	NHA	DAY	CHI	GTY	IRP	CGV	GLN	MCH	BRI	CAL	RCH	DOV	KAN	CLT	MEM; 29	TEX	PHO	HOM	125th	76	

=== ARCA Re/Max Series ===
(key) (Bold – Pole position awarded by qualifying time. Italics – Pole position earned by points standings or practice time. * – Most laps led.)

ARCA Re/Max Series results
Year	Team	No.	Make	1	2	3	4	5	6	7	8	9	10	11	12	13	14	15	16	17	18	19	20	21	22	23	ARMSC	Pts	Ref
2007	TC Motorsports	35	Chevy	DAY	USA	NSH	SLM	KAN	WIN	KEN	TOL	IOW	POC	MCH	BLN	KEN	POC	NSH; 33	ISF	MIL	GTW	DSF	CHI	SLM	TAL	TOL	166th	65	
