= Dwayne Leik =

American racing driver (born 1964)

- Born: February 9, 1964 (age 62); Skyland, North Carolina, U.S.

NASCAR O'Reilly Auto Parts Series career
- 14 races run over 5 years
- Best finish: 79th (2002)
- First race: 2001 Carquest Auto Parts 250 (Gateway)
- Last race: 2008 Meijer 300 (Kentucky)
| Wins | Top tens | Poles |
|---|---|---|
| 0 | 0 | 0 |
- Statistics up to date as of February 17, 2013.

Dwayne Leik (born February 9, 1964) is an American former stock car racing driver. He was formerly an owner of Leik Motorsports and a part-time driver in the NASCAR Nationwide Series. He formerly worked as the business manager for Marcis Auto Racing and legendary NASCAR driver Dave Marcis. Leik was able to secure racing sponsorship for Marcis for eleven consecutive seasons and he is widely regarded as the key figure in resurrecting Marcis' faltering career. Since Marcis Racing did not have a test team, Leik's car was often seen as a test car for Marcis Racing. Leik also accompanied Marcis and participated in the IROC (International Race of Champions) test sessions. He once logged over 1,100 miles (1,800 km) in an IROC car at Daytona in a single day test. He has also served as a driving instructor at the Fast Track High Performance Driving School and Richard Petty Driving School.

== Early racing career ==
Leik began his racing career with SCCA racing in Florida. He is also a veteran of Late Model Stock divisions.

== ARCA racing ==
In 13 career ARCA RE/MAX Series starts, Leik had one top-five, two top-ten, eight top-20 finishes. He finished tenth at Charlotte in his first ever ARCA race, with a best finish of fourth at Pococno.

== NASCAR career ==
Leik purchased two NASCAR Busch/Nationwide Series cars from Andy Petree Racing. Under funding and time limitations have always plagued his career. Through his career, he qualified and started in fourteen second-tier series races with his best finishes coming at Chicagoland Speedway where he finished 24th twice. His Nationwide career earnings are 247,723.00. One race of note that typifies his career is when he qualified a car for Davis Motorsports in 2008 at the biggest race of the year, Daytona, only to give up his starting spot to the owner's son Kertus whose car did not make the race. "This is a small father and son operation and they didn’t put in all of those long hours to watch me race one of their cars while Kertus sat out... It doesn't matter to me if I qualified it; Kertus deserves to be in their own car... it's the right thing."

In 2006, Leik partnered with Keith Duesenberg to form Duesenberg & Leik Motorsports. The team ran the full 2006 Busch Series season with driver Jay Sauter and sponsor Western Union. In the year of the "Buschwhackers" (half the field being NASCAR Cup Series drivers) the team posted three top-ten, six top-15, and 13 top-20 finishes. The team's best qualifying efforts were second at Martinsville, sixth at California and seventh at Richmond. The team earned $751,219 in purse money. Leik ran one race for the team, at Daytona.

=== Winston Cup Series ===
Between 2000 and 2002, Leik attempted to qualify for four Winston Cup Series races, driving a No. 72 Chevrolet for Marcis Auto Racing in all attempts; he failed to qualify for any of the four races.

== Business ventures ==
Leik is the owner of two NASCAR-related companies: Leik Motorsports, Inc., a NASCAR team and Motorsports Marketing, Inc., a NASCAR marketing company. He also owns Mobile Marketing Displays, Inc., a developer of mobile marketing exhibits, Leik Incorporated, a real estate holding company; Mountain Construction Company, Inc., a residential and commercial construction company, and Norman’s Ice Cream Service, Inc., a mobile ice cream business.

== Personal life ==
Leik graduated from the University of Michigan. He rowed on the university crew team for four years. Post college, he continued to row and is a three-time U.S. National Rowing Champion.

== Motorsports career results ==
=== NASCAR ===
(key) (Bold – Pole position awarded by qualifying time. Italics – Pole position earned by points standings or practice time. * – Most laps led.)

==== Winston Cup Series ====
NASCAR Winston Cup Series results
| Year | Team | No. | Make | 1 | 2 | 3 | 4 | 5 | 6 | 7 | 8 | 9 | 10 | 11 | 12 | 13 | 14 | 15 | 16 | 17 | 18 | 19 | 20 | 21 | 22 | 23 | 24 | 25 | 26 | 27 | 28 | 29 | 30 | 31 | 32 | 33 | 34 | 35 | 36 | NWCC | Pts | Ref |
|---|---|---|---|---|---|---|---|---|---|---|---|---|---|---|---|---|---|---|---|---|---|---|---|---|---|---|---|---|---|---|---|---|---|---|---|---|---|---|---|---|---|---|
| 2000 | Marcis Auto Racing | 72 | Chevy | DAY | CAR | LVS | ATL | DAR | BRI | TEX | MAR | TAL | CAL; DNQ | RCH | CLT | DOV | MCH | POC; DNQ | SON | DAY | NHA | POC | IND | GLN | MCH | BRI | DAR | RCH | NHA | DOV | MAR | CLT | TAL | CAR | PHO | HOM | ATL | | | N/A | - | |
| 2001 | Marcis Auto Racing | 72 | Chevy | DAY; DNQ | CAR | LVS | ATL | DAR | BRI | TEX | MAR | TAL | CAL | RCH | CLT | DOV | MCH | POC | SON | DAY | CHI | NHA | POC | IND | GLN | MCH | BRI | DAR | RCH | DOV | KAN | CLT | MAR | TAL | PHO | CAR | HOM | ATL | NHA | N/A | - | |
| 2002 | Marcis Auto Racing | 72 | Chevy | DAY; DNQ | CAR | LVS | ATL | DAR | BRI | TEX | MAR | TAL | CAL | RCH | CLT | DOV | POC | MCH | SON | DAY | CHI | NHA | POC | IND | GLN | MCH | BRI | DAR | RCH | NHA | DOV | KAN | TAL | CLT | MAR | ATL | CAR | PHO | HOM | N/A | - | |

===== Daytona 500 =====
| Year | Team | Manufacturer | Start | Finish |
|---|---|---|---|---|
| 2001 | Marcis Auto Racing | Chevrolet | DNQ | |
| 2002 | Marcis Auto Racing | Chevrolet | DNQ | |

==== Nationwide Series ====
NASCAR Nationwide Series results
| Year | Team | No. | Make | 1 | 2 | 3 | 4 | 5 | 6 | 7 | 8 | 9 | 10 | 11 | 12 | 13 | 14 | 15 | 16 | 17 | 18 | 19 | 20 | 21 | 22 | 23 | 24 | 25 | 26 | 27 | 28 | 29 | 30 | 31 | 32 | 33 | 34 | 35 | NNSC | Pts | Ref |
|---|---|---|---|---|---|---|---|---|---|---|---|---|---|---|---|---|---|---|---|---|---|---|---|---|---|---|---|---|---|---|---|---|---|---|---|---|---|---|---|---|---|
| 2001 | Leik Motorsports | 81 | Chevy | DAY | CAR | LVS | ATL | DAR | BRI | TEX | NSH | TAL | CAL | RCH | NHA | NZH | CLT; DNQ | DOV | KEN | MLW | GLN | CHI | GTY; 35 | PPR | IRP | MCH; DNQ | BRI | DAR | RCH | DOV | KAN | CLT; DNQ | MEM | PHO | CAR | HOM | | | 124th | 58 | |
| 2002 | Leik Motorsports | 81 | Chevy | DAY | CAR | LVS | DAR; 40 | BRI | TEX; DNQ | NSH | TAL | CAL | RCH | NHA | NZH | CLT | DOV | NSH | KEN; DNQ | MLW | DAY | CHI; 24 | GTY | PPR | IRP | MCH; 40 | BRI | DAR | RCH | DOV | KAN | CLT | MEM | ATL; 37 | CAR | PHO | HOM; DNQ | | 79th | 229 | |
| 2003 | Leik Motorsports | 81 | Chevy | DAY | CAR | LVS | DAR | BRI | TEX | TAL | NSH | CAL | RCH | GTY | NZH | CLT | DOV | NSH | KEN; 26 | MLW | DAY | CHI; 25 | NHA | PPR | IRP | MCH; 35 | BRI | DAR | RCH | DOV | KAN | CLT | MEM | ATL; DNQ | PHO | CAR | HOM | | 88th | 231 | |
| 2006 | Duesenberg & Leik Motorsports | 26 | Chevy | DAY | CAL | MXC | LVS | ATL | BRI | TEX | NSH | PHO | TAL | RCH | DAR | CLT | DOV | NSH | KEN | MLW | DAY; 32 | CHI | NHA | MAR | GTY | IRP | GLN | MCH | BRI | CAL | RCH | DOV | KAN | CLT | MEM | TEX | PHO | HOM | 128th | 67 | |
| 2008 | JD Motorsports | 01 | Chevy | DAY; QL^{†} | | | | | | | | | | | | | | | KEN; 40 | MLW | NHA | DAY | CHI | GTY | IRP | CGV | GLN | MCH | BRI | CAL | RCH | DOV | KAN | CLT | MEM | TEX | PHO | HOM | 90th | 214 | |
| 2008 | JD Motorsports | 0 | Chevy | | CAL; 38 | LVS; 41 | ATL; 43 | BRI | NSH | TEX | PHO | MXC | TAL; 40 | RCH | DAR | CLT | DOV | NSH | | | | | | | | | | | | | | | | | | | | | 90th | 214 | |
^{†} – Replaced by Kertus Davis.

==== Craftsman Truck Series ====
NASCAR Craftsman Truck Series results
| Year | Team | No. | Make | 1 | 2 | 3 | 4 | 5 | 6 | 7 | 8 | 9 | 10 | 11 | 12 | 13 | 14 | 15 | 16 | 17 | 18 | 19 | 20 | 21 | 22 | 23 | 24 | 25 | NCTC | Pts | Ref |
|---|---|---|---|---|---|---|---|---|---|---|---|---|---|---|---|---|---|---|---|---|---|---|---|---|---|---|---|---|---|---|---|
| 1999 | Raptor Performance Motorsports | 81 | Ford | HOM | PHO | EVG | MMR | MAR | MEM | PPR | I70 | BRI | TEX | PIR | GLN | MLW | NSV | NZH | MCH | NHA | IRP | GTY | HPT | RCH | LVS; DNQ | LVL | TEX | CAL | 123rd | 40 | |

=== ARCA Bondo/Mar-Hyde Series ===
(key) (Bold – Pole position awarded by qualifying time. Italics – Pole position earned by points standings or practice time. * – Most laps led. ** – All laps led.)

ARCA Bondo/Mar-Hyde Series results
| Year | Team | No. | Make | 1 | 2 | 3 | 4 | 5 | 6 | 7 | 8 | 9 | 10 | 11 | 12 | 13 | 14 | 15 | 16 | 17 | 18 | 19 | 20 | 21 | 22 | ABMHSC | Pts | Ref |
|---|---|---|---|---|---|---|---|---|---|---|---|---|---|---|---|---|---|---|---|---|---|---|---|---|---|---|---|---|
| 1997 | Marcis Auto Racing | 71 | Chevy | DAY | ATL | SLM | CLT | CLT | POC | MCH | SBS | TOL | KIL | FRS | MIN | POC | MCH | DSF | GTW | SLM | WIN | CLT; 10 | TAL | ISF | ATL; 12 | N/A | 0 | |
| 1998 | Marcis Auto Racing | 71 | Chevy | DAY | ATL | SLM | CLT; 35 | MEM | MCH | POC | SBS | TOL | PPR | POC; 4 | KIL | FRS | ISF | ATL | DSF | SLM | TEX | WIN | CLT; 31 | TAL | ATL; 38 | N/A | 0 | |
| 1999 | Marcis Auto Racing | 71 | Chevy | DAY; DNQ | ATL | SLM | AND | CLT; 29 | MCH; 21 | POC; DNQ | TOL | SBS | BLN | POC; 12 | KIL | FRS | FLM | ISF | WIN | DSF | SLM | CLT; 15 | TAL | ATL; 27 | | 45th | 655 | |
| 2000 | Marcis Auto Racing | 71 | Chevy | DAY | SLM | AND | CLT | KIL | FRS | MCH | POC | TOL | KEN | BLN | POC | WIN | ISF | KEN | DSF | SLM | CLT | TAL; 11 | ATL; 20 | | | 69th | 305 | |
