= C. W. Smith (racing driver) =

American racing driver (1947–2017)

- Born: October 28, 1947; Williamsport, Pennsylvania, U.S.
- Died: November 4, 2017 (aged 70); Danville, Pennsylvania, U.S.
- Cause of death: Leukemia

NASCAR O'Reilly Auto Parts Series career
- 7 races run over 4 years
- Best finish: 86th (2002)
- First race: 2001 Subway 300 (Talladega)
- Last race: 2005 Winn-Dixie 250 (Daytona)
Wins	Top tens	Poles
0	0	0

C. W. "Skip" Smith (October 28, 1947 – November 4, 2017) was an American stock car racing driver and Pennsylvania state trooper who previously ran seven NASCAR Busch Series races and 24 ARCA Racing Series races between 1994 and 2005.

== Racing career ==
Smith drove in 24 ARCA Racing Series races from 1994 to 2004 in his self-owned No. 67 Chevrolet. Never running more than four races in one season, Smith finished as high as 66th in points (in 1996) and failed to qualify just once in his 22 attempts. He finished his ARCA career following 2004, having run on just three different tracks (Daytona, Talladega, and his native Pocono), posting six top-tens (with a best finish of sixth), and nine DNFs in 21 career races.

Smith took his ARCA team up to the NASCAR Busch Series beginning in 1999. Along with Daytona and Talladega (Pocono not being on the schedule), he would also attempt races at Rockingham and Michigan. He would attempt 15 races between 1999 and 2005, making the field seven of those times.

Acquiring sponsorship from Panasonic for the 2002 season, he is perhaps best known for his performance in that year's Aaron's 312 at Talladega. Making it through The Big One on lap 15 took out 27 cars, Smith was running in the top-ten for most of the race until overheating issues ended his day on lap 75 of 117. Despite the DNF, Smith would still finish the race in thirteenth, his best finish in the series.

Smith would retire following the 2005 season, ending his career with two top-fifteen finishes and six DNFs.

== Personal life ==
Smith was a graduate of Williamsport Area Community College and the Pennsylvania State Police Academy, serving as a Pennsylvania state trooper for 35 years. His son Jason Smith won the Pro Stock track championship at Selinsgrove Speedway in 2009.

Smith died of leukemia on November 4, 2017.

== Motorsports career results ==
=== NASCAR ===
(key) (Bold – Pole position awarded by qualifying time. Italics – Pole position earned by points standings or practice time. * – Most laps led.)

==== Busch Series ====
NASCAR Busch Series results
Year	Team	No.	Make	1	2	3	4	5	6	7	8	9	10	11	12	13	14	15	16	17	18	19	20	21	22	23	24	25	26	27	28	29	30	31	32	33	34	35	NBSC	Pts	Ref
1999	Smith Brothers Motorsports	67	Chevy	DAY; DNQ	CAR	LVS	ATL	DAR	TEX	NSV	BRI	TAL; DNQ	CAL	NHA	RCH	NZH	CLT	DOV	SBO	GLN	MLW	MYB	PPR	GTY	IRP	MCH	BRI	DAR	RCH	DOV	CLT	CAR	MEM	PHO	HOM				NA	-	
2000	Smith Brothers Motorsports	67	Pontiac	DAY; DNQ	CAR	LVS	ATL	DAR	BRI	TEX	NSV	TAL	CAL	RCH	NHA	CLT	DOV	SBO	MYB	GLN	MLW	NZH	PPR	GTY	IRP	MCH	BRI	DAR	RCH	DOV	CLT	CAR	MEM	PHO	HOM				NA	-	
2001	Smith Brothers Motorsports	67	Chevy	DAY	CAR	LVS	ATL	DAR	BRI	TEX	NSH	TAL; 36	CAL	RCH	NHA	NZH	CLT	DOV	KEN	MLW	GLN	CHI	GTY	PPR	IRP	MCH	BRI	DAR	RCH	DOV	KAN	CLT	MEM	PHO	CAR	HOM			126th	55	
2002	Smith Brothers Motorsports	67	Pontiac	DAY; DNQ	CAR	LVS	DAR	BRI	TEX	NSH																									CAR; DNQ	PHO	HOM		86th	194	
2002	Smith Brothers Motorsports	67	Chevy								TAL; 14	CAL	RCH	NHA	NZH	CLT	DOV	NSH	KEN	MLW	DAY; 30	CHI	GTY	PPR	IRP	MCH	BRI	DAR	RCH	DOV	KAN	CLT	MEM	ATL					86th	194	
2003	Smith Brothers Motorsports	67	Chevy	DAY; DNQ	CAR	LVS	DAR	BRI	TEX	TAL	NSH	CAL	RCH	GTY	NZH	CLT	DOV	NSH	KEN	MLW	DAY	CHI	NHA	PPR	IRP	MCH	BRI	DAR	RCH	DOV	KAN	CLT	MEM	ATL	PHO	CAR	HOM		NA	-	
2004	Smith Brothers Motorsports	67	Chevy	DAY; 39	CAR	LVS	DAR	BRI	TEX	NSH	TAL; 15	CAL	GTY	RCH	NZH	CLT	DOV	NSH	KEN	MLW	DAY; 39	CHI	NHA	PPR	IRP														94th	210	
2004	Smith Brothers Motorsports	67	Pontiac																							MCH; DNQ	BRI	CAL	RCH	DOV	KAN	CLT	MEM	ATL	PHO	DAR	HOM		94th	210	
2005	Smith Brothers Motorsports	67	Chevy	DAY; DNQ	CAL	MXC	LVS	ATL	NSH	BRI	TEX	PHO	TAL	DAR	RCH	CLT	DOV	NSH	KEN	MLW																			135th	52	
2005	Smith Brothers Motorsports	67	Dodge																		DAY; 37	CHI	NHA	PPR	GTY	IRP	GLN	MCH	BRI	CAL	RCH	DOV	KAN	CLT	MEM	TEX	PHO	HOM	135th	52	

=== ARCA Re/Max Series ===
(key) (Bold – Pole position awarded by qualifying time. Italics – Pole position earned by points standings or practice time. * – Most laps led.)

ARCA Re/Max Series results
Year	Team	No.	Make	1	2	3	4	5	6	7	8	9	10	11	12	13	14	15	16	17	18	19	20	21	22	23	24	25	ARMC	Pts	Ref
1994	Smith Brothers Motorsports	28	Chevy	DAY	TAL	FIF	LVL	KIL	TOL	FRS	MCH	DMS	POC; 22	POC	KIL	FRS	INF	I70	ISF	DSF	TOL	SLM	WIN	ATL					140th	-	
1995	Smith Brothers Motorsports	28	Chevy	DAY	ATL	TAL	FIF	KIL	FRS	MCH	I80	MCS	FRS	POC; 28	POC; 34	KIL	FRS	SBS	LVL	ISF	DSF	SLM	WIN	ATL					96th	-	
1996	Smith Brothers Motorsports	67	Chevy	DAY; 22	ATL	SLM																							66th	-	
1996	Smith Brothers Motorsports	28	Chevy				TAL; 14	FIF	LVL	CLT	CLT; DNQ	KIL	FRS	POC; 10	MCH	FRS	TOL	POC; 26	MCH	INF	SBS	ISF	DSF	KIL	SLM	WIN	CLT	ATL	66th	-	
1997	Smith Brothers Motorsports	28	Chevy	DAY; DNQ	ATL	SLM	CLT	CLT	POC; 6	MCH	SBS	TOL	KIL	FRS	MIN	POC; 10	MCH	DSF	GTW	SLM	WIN	CLT	TAL; 7	ISF	ATL; DNQ				81st	-	
1999	Smith Brothers Motorsports	28	Chevy	DAY	ATL	SLM	AND	CLT	MCH	POC	TOL	SBS	BLN	POC	KIL	FRS	FLM	ISF	WIN	DSF	SLM	CLT	TAL; 19	ATL					112th	135	
2000	Smith Brothers Motorsports	28	Chevy	DAY; 38	SLM	AND	CLT	KIL	FRS	MCH	POC; 24	TOL	KEN	BLN	POC; DNQ	WIN	ISF	KEN	DSF	SLM	CLT	TAL; 39	ATL						88th	210	
2001	Smith Brothers Motorsports	28	Chevy	DAY; 38	NSH	WIN	SLM	GTY	KEN	CLT	KAN	MCH						POC; 11	NSH	ISF	CHI	DSF	SLM	TOL	BLN	CLT			72nd	470	
2001	Venturini Motorsports	25	Chevy										POC; 26	MEM	GLN	KEN	MCH												72nd	470	
2001	Smith Brothers Motorsports	8	Chevy																								TAL; 15	ATL	72nd	470	
2002	Smith Brothers Motorsports	42	Chevy	DAY; 25	ATL	NSH	SLM	KEN	CLT	KAN	POC; 28	MCH	TOL	SBO	KEN	BLN	POC; 10	NSH	ISF	WIN	DSF	CHI	SLM	TAL; 33	CLT				67th	440	
2003	Smith Brothers Motorsports	42	Chevy	DAY	ATL	NSH	SLM	TOL	KEN	CLT	BLN	KAN	MCH	LER	POC	POC; DNQ	NSH	ISF	WIN	DSF	CHI	SLM	TAL; 9	CLT	SBO				124th	185	
2004	Wayne Peterson Racing	06	Chevy	DAY	NSH	SLM	KEN	TOL	CLT	KAN	POC	MCH; 36	SBO	BLN	KEN	GTW	POC	LER	NSH	ISF	TOL	DSF	CHI	SLM	TAL				182nd	50	
