= Richard Mitchell (racing driver) =

American racing driver

- Born: January 30, 1967 (age 59); Bruceton Mills, West Virginia, U.S.

NASCAR O'Reilly Auto Parts Series career
- 4 races run over 1 year
- Best finish: 72nd (2002)
- First race: 2002 Pepsi 300 Presented by Kroger (Nashville)
- Last race: 2002 Sam's Club 200 (Rockingham)
Wins	Top tens	Poles
0	0	0

ARCA Menards Series career
- 15 races run over 2 years
- Best finish: 24th (2002)
- First race: 2001 EasyCare Vehicle Services Contracts 100 (Charlotte)
- Last race: 2002 EasyCare Vehicle Services Contracts 100 (Charlotte)
Wins	Top tens	Poles
0	9	0
- Statistics up to date as of November 28, 2024.

Richard Mitchell (born January 30, 1967) is an American former professional stock car racing driver who has competed in the NASCAR Busch Series, the NASCAR Busch North Series, and the ARCA Re/Max Series.

Mitchell has also competed in the Mid-Atlantic Asphalt Racing Alliance.

== Motorsports results ==
=== NASCAR ===
(key) (Bold - Pole position awarded by qualifying time. Italics - Pole position earned by points standings or practice time. * – Most laps led.)

==== Busch Series ====
NASCAR Busch Series results
Year	Team	No.	Make	1	2	3	4	5	6	7	8	9	10	11	12	13	14	15	16	17	18	19	20	21	22	23	24	25	26	27	28	29	30	31	32	33	34	NBSC	Pts	Ref
2002	Mac Hill Motorsports	56	Chevy	DAY	CAR	LVS	DAR	BRI	TEX	NSH; 35	TAL	CAL	RCH	NHA	NZH	CLT	DOV	NSH; 34	KEN	MLW	DAY	CHI; DNQ	GTY	PPR	IRP	MCH; DNQ	BRI	DAR	RCH; 23	DOV; DNQ	KAN	CLT	MEM	ATL	CAR; 32	PHO	HOM	72nd	280	

==== Busch North Series ====
NASCAR Busch North Series results
Year	Team	No.	Make	1	2	3	4	5	6	7	8	9	10	11	12	13	14	15	16	17	18	19	20	NBNSC	Pts	Ref
1999	Tony Vecchio	1	Chevy	LEE	RPS	NHA	TMP	NZH	HOL	BEE	JEN; 8	GLN	STA	NHA	NZH	STA	NHA	GLN	EPP	THU	BEE	NHA	LRP	74th	142	
2000	N/A	22	Chevy	LEE	NHA	SEE	HOL	BEE	JEN; 18	GLN	STA	NHA	NZH	STA	WFD	GLN	EPP	TMP	THU	BEE	NHA	LRP		78th	109	

=== ARCA Re/Max Series ===
(key) (Bold – Pole position awarded by qualifying time. Italics – Pole position earned by points standings or practice time. * – Most laps led. ** – All laps led.)

ARCA Re/Max Series results
Year	Team	No.	Make	1	2	3	4	5	6	7	8	9	10	11	12	13	14	15	16	17	18	19	20	21	22	23	24	25	ARMSC	Pts	Ref
2001	Mac Hill Motorsports	54	Pontiac	DAY	NSH	WIN	SLM	GTY	KEN; DNQ	CLT; 26	KAN	MCH; 13	POC; 11	MEM	GLN	KEN	MCH; 5	POC; 26	NSH	ISF	CHI; 9	DSF	SLM	TOL	BLN	CLT; 10	TAL; 5	ATL; 22	28th	1435	
2002	Mac Hill Motorsports	54	Pontiac	DAY; 7	ATL	NSH	SLM	KEN	CLT; 5	KAN	POC	MCH; 3	TOL	SBO	KEN	BLN	POC; 27	NSH	ISF	WIN	DSF	CHI	SLM	TAL; 6	CLT; 10				24th	1340	
