= Rick Markle =

American racing driver and crew chief

- Born: February 3, 1972 (age 54); Fowlerville, Michigan, U.S.

NASCAR O'Reilly Auto Parts Series career
- 13 races run over 4 years
- Best finish: 75th (2003)
- First race: 2001 MBNA.com 200 (Dover)
- Last race: 2004 Winn-Dixie 250 Presented by PepsiCo (Daytona)
Wins	Top tens	Poles
0	0	0

NASCAR FedEx Freight Truck Series career
- 2 races run over 4 years
- Best finish: 105th (1996)
- First race: 1996 Florida Dodge Dealers 400 (Homestead)
- Last race: 2008 Cool City Customs 200 (Michigan)
Wins	Top tens	Poles
0	0	0

ARCA Menards Series career
- 10 races run over 4 years
- Best finish: 33rd (2001)
- First race: 1999 Johnson Industries / EasyCare Vehicle Service Contracts 300k (Atlanta)
- Last race: 2001 Food World 300 (Talladega)
Wins	Top tens	Poles
0	1	0
- Statistics up to date as of November 28, 2024.

Rick Markle (born February 3, 1972) is an American former professional stock car racing driver and crew chief who has competed in the NASCAR Busch Series, the NASCAR Craftsman Truck Series, and the ARCA Re/Max Series. He last served as a crew chief for MBM Motorsports in the ARCA Menards Series.

Markle has also previously competed in the X-1R Pro Cup Series.

== Motorsports results ==
=== NASCAR ===
(key) (Bold - Pole position awarded by qualifying time. Italics - Pole position earned by points standings or practice time. * – Most laps led.)

==== Busch Series ====
NASCAR Busch Series results
Year	Team	No.	Make	1	2	3	4	5	6	7	8	9	10	11	12	13	14	15	16	17	18	19	20	21	22	23	24	25	26	27	28	29	30	31	32	33	34	NBSC	Pts	Ref
2001	DF2 Motorsports	94	Chevy	DAY	CAR	LVS	ATL	DAR	BRI	TEX	NSH	TAL	CAL	RCH	NHA	NZH	CLT	DOV	KEN	MLW	GLN	CHI	GTY	PPR	IRP	MCH	BRI	DAR	RCH	DOV; 39	KAN; 42	CLT	MEM	PHO	CAR	HOM		110th	83	
2002	Del Markle	96	Pontiac	DAY	CAR	LVS	DAR	BRI	TEX	NSH	TAL; DNQ																											99th	95	
2002	DF2 Motorsports	94	Chevy									CAL; 38	RCH	NHA																								99th	95	
2002	GIC-Mixon Motorsports	72	Chevy												NZH; 42	CLT	DOV	NSH	KEN	MLW	DAY	CHI	GTY															99th	95	
2002	Jay Robinson Racing	49	Ford																					PPR; 39	IRP													99th	95	
2002	Brian Weber Racing	84	Chevy																							MCH; DNQ	BRI	DAR	RCH	DOV	KAN	CLT	MEM	ATL	CAR	PHO	HOM	99th	95	
2003	Del Markle	68	Pontiac	DAY	CAR	LVS	DAR	BRI	TEX	TAL; 12	NSH	CAL	RCH	GTY																								75th	362	
2003	Del Markle	68	Chevy												NZH; 39	CLT	DOV	NSH	KEN; DNQ	MLW; 42	DAY	CHI	NHA	PPR; 27	IRP	MCH; DNQ	BRI	DAR; 31	RCH	DOV	KAN	CLT	MEM	ATL	PHO	CAR	HOM	75th	362	
2004	Del Markle	68	Chevy	DAY; 26	CAR	LVS	DAR	BRI	TEX	NSH	TAL; 43	CAL	GTY	RCH	NZH	CLT	DOV	NSH	KEN	MLW	DAY; 20	CHI	NHA	PPR	IRP	MCH	BRI; DNQ	CAL	RCH	DOV	KAN	CLT	MEM	ATL	PHO	DAR	HOM	91st	222	

==== Craftsman Truck Series ====
NASCAR Craftsman Truck Series results
Year	Team	No.	Make	1	2	3	4	5	6	7	8	9	10	11	12	13	14	15	16	17	18	19	20	21	22	23	24	25	26	NCTC	Pts	Ref
1996	Del Markle	71	Chevy	HOM; 35	PHO	POR	EVG	TUS	CNS	HPT	BRI	NZH	MLW	LVL	I70	IRP	FLM	GLN	NSV	RCH	NHA	MAR	NWS; DNQ	SON	MMR	PHO	LVS			105th	101	
1997	Spears Motorsports	75	Chevy	WDW	TUS	HOM	PHO	POR	EVG	I70	NHA	TEX	BRI	NZH	MLW	LVL	CNS	HPT	IRP	FLM	NSV	GLN	RCH	MAR; DNQ	SON	MMR	CAL	PHO	LVS	160th	10	
2005	Shaw Racing	45	Chevy	DAY; DNQ	CAL	ATL	MAR	GTY	MFD	CLT	DOV	TEX	MCH	MLW	KAN	KEN	MEM	IRP	NSH	BRI	RCH	NHA	LVS	MAR	ATL	TEX	PHO	HOM		N/A	0	
2008	Derrike Cope Inc.	73	Dodge	DAY	CAL	ATL	MAR	KAN	CLT	MFD	DOV	TEX	MCH; 33	MLW	MEM	KEN	IRP	NSH	BRI	GTW	NHA	LVS	TAL	MAR	ATL	TEX	PHO	HOM		107th	64	

=== ARCA Re/Max Series ===
(key) (Bold – Pole position awarded by qualifying time. Italics – Pole position earned by points standings or practice time. * – Most laps led. ** – All laps led.)

ARCA Re/Max Series results
Year	Team	No.	Make	1	2	3	4	5	6	7	8	9	10	11	12	13	14	15	16	17	18	19	20	21	22	23	24	25	ARMSC	Pts	Ref
1999	Del Markle	60	Chevy	DAY	ATL; 36	SLM	AND	CLT	MCH; DNQ	POC; DNQ	TOL	SBS	BLN	POC	KIL	FRS	FLM	ISF	WIN	DSF	SLM	CLT							127th	100	
1999	Mansion Motorsports	41	Chevy																				TAL; DNQ	ATL					127th	100	
2000	Del Markle	60	Chevy	DAY; 29	SLM	AND	CLT	KIL	FRS	MCH	POC	TOL	KEN	BLN	POC	WIN	ISF	KEN	DSF	SLM	CLT	TAL; 38	ATL						113th	125	
2001	Del Markle	60	Chevy	DAY; DNQ	NSH; 12	WIN; 25	SLM; 8	GTY; 13	KEN; 33	CLT; 27	KAN	MCH	POC	MEM	GLN	KEN	MCH	POC	NSH	ISF	CHI	DSF	SLM	TOL	BLN	CLT	TAL; 14	ATL	33rd	1230	
2002	Del Markle	60	Chevy	DAY; DNQ	ATL	NSH	SLM	KEN	CLT	KAN	POC	MCH	TOL	SBO	KEN	BLN	POC	NSH	ISF	WIN	DSF	CHI	SLM	TAL	CLT				N/A	0	
