= Jason Schuler =

American racing driver

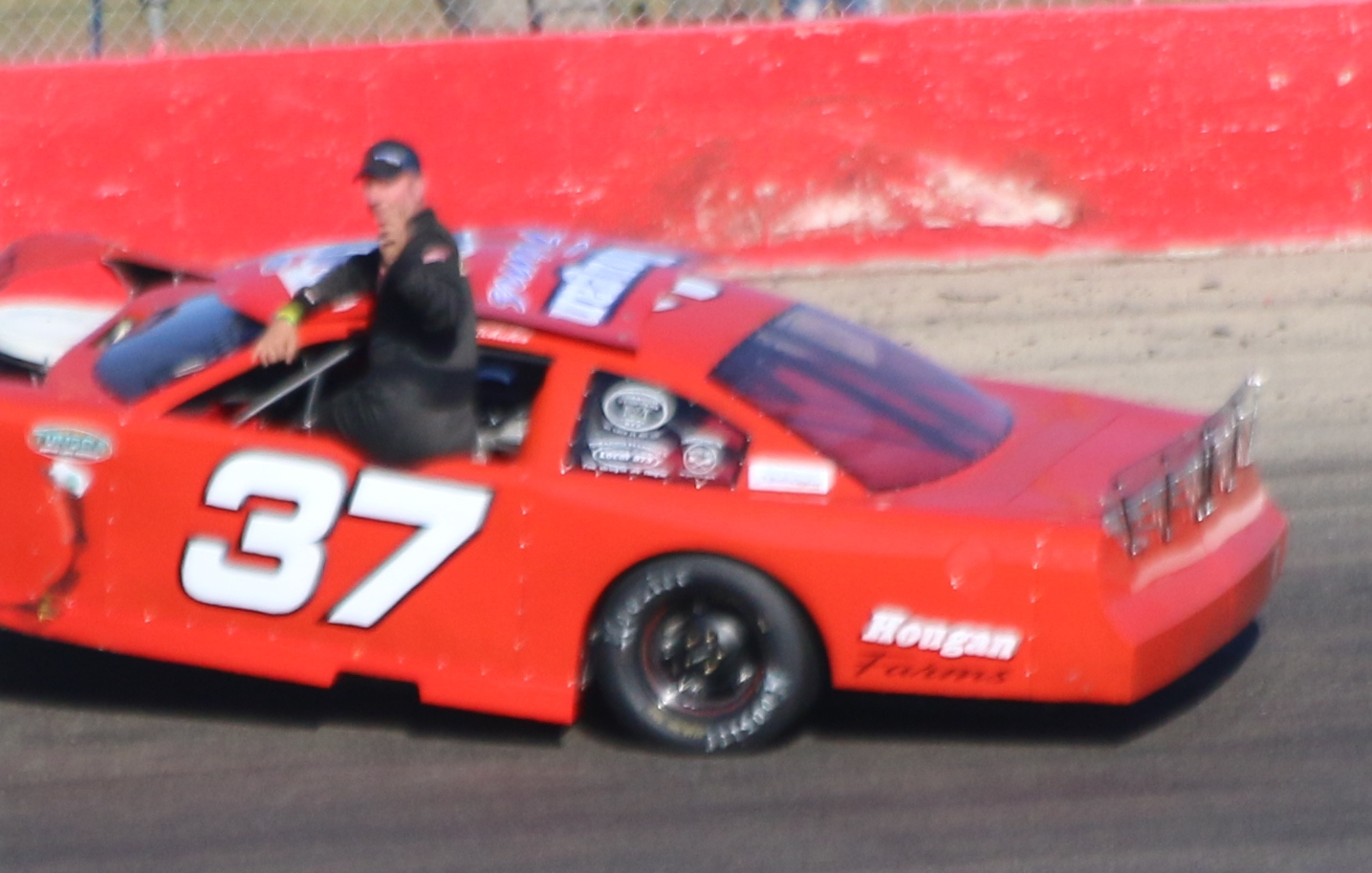
- Schuler in a late model race in 2016
- Born: February 24, 1972 (age 54) Cambridge, Wisconsin, U.S.

Previous series
- 1998–2002 1999 1998 2001: NASCAR Midwest Series; NASCAR Southeast Series; NASCAR Southwest Series; ASA Series

NASCAR O'Reilly Auto Parts Series career
- 52 races run over 5 years
- Best finish: 28th (2003)
- First race: 2000 BellSouth Mobility 320 (Nashville)
- Last race: 2004 Alan Kulwicki 250 (Milwaukee)
Wins	Top tens	Poles
0	0	0
- Statistics up to date as of June 15, 2020.

Jason Paul Schuler (born February 24, 1972) is an American former stock car racing driver. He competed in the NASCAR Busch Series from 2000 to 2004. He is currently building cars for JJ Fabrication, Inc. (formerly Pathfinder Chassis), the company he owns and operates along with Joe Wood in Sun Prairie, Wisconsin.

== Racing career ==
Schuler made his first starts in the Busch Series in 2000 when fellow Cambridge native and childhood friend Matt Kenseth, a full-time Cup Series driver, offered him a ride for twelve races in the No. 17 Visine Chevy for Reiser Enterprises that Kenseth was driving part-time. His best finish on the year was 14th at both Gateway (where he led two laps) and at New Hampshire. Schuler struggled, only earning four top-20 finishes, leading to his release at the end of the season in favor of Clay Rogers.

Schuler only made two starts in 2001, both for Buckshot Racing. Schuler finished 41st at Gateway and 35th at Pikes Peak in the No. 04, a second part-time car for the team.

Schuler only ran five times in 2002, all for the Havill-Spoerl Racing team. However, the team did not finish any of the starts, and Schuler's best finish was a pair of 36ths.

Schuler made the most races of his career in 2003, when Havill-Spoerl went full-time and Schuler made twenty-seven starts. His best run (and career finish) came at Nashville, where he finished 13th. In addition, Schuler added on two more top-twenties at Talladega and Gateway. At Pikes Peak, Schuler led eleven laps under caution before falling out in 28th. Schuler finished 28th in points, the highest he has ever ranked in NASCAR.

Schuler began 2004 by making six starts for Davis Motorsports in the No. 10 Chevy. Schuler finished four of those starts and had a best finish of 27th at North Carolina Speedway. He also made a start for Allen Racing at the Milwaukee Mile, where he finished 42nd.

After being without a ride for the 2005 season, Schuler returned to Wisconsin to drive late models and bought Pathfinder Chassis / JJ Motorsports Racing in 2005 along with Jon Wood based on Kenseth's recommendation; they moved the race car manufacturing shop to Sun Prairie, Wisconsin. In 2010, he was crew chief for Ross Kenseth and Ty Majeski.

== Motorsports career results ==
=== NASCAR ===
(key) (Bold – Pole position awarded by qualifying time. Italics – Pole position earned by points standings or practice time. * – Most laps led.)

==== Busch Series ====
NASCAR Busch Series results
Year	Team	No.	Make	1	2	3	4	5	6	7	8	9	10	11	12	13	14	15	16	17	18	19	20	21	22	23	24	25	26	27	28	29	30	31	32	33	34	NBSC	Pts	Ref
2000	Reiser Enterprises	17	Chevy	DAY	CAR	LVS	ATL	DAR	BRI	TEX	NSV; 32	TAL	CAL	RCH	NHA; 14	CLT	DOV	SBO; 38	MYB; 32	GLN; 22	MLW; 21	NZH; 16	PPR; 30	GTY; 14	IRP; 33	MCH	BRI	DAR	RCH	DOV	CLT	CAR	MEM; 17	PHO	HOM			44th	991	
2001	Buckshot Racing	04	Chevy	DAY	CAR	LVS	ATL	DAR	BRI	TEX	NSH	TAL	CAL	RCH	NHA	NZH	CLT	DOV	KEN	MLW	GLN	CHI	GTY; 41	PPR; 36	IRP	MCH	BRI	DAR	RCH	DOV	KAN	CLT	MEM	PHO	CAR	HOM		104th	95	
2002	Havill-Spoerl Racing	73	Ford	DAY	CAR	LVS	DAR	BRI	TEX; DNQ	NSH; 36	TAL	CAL	RCH	NHA	NZH	CLT	DOV	NSH; DNQ	KEN; DNQ	MLW; 39	DAY	CHI; DNQ	GTY; 37	PPR; 36	IRP; 42	MCH; DNQ	BRI	DAR	RCH	DOV	KAN; DNQ	CLT	MEM; DNQ	ATL	CAR	PHO	HOM	78th	245	
2003	Havill-Spoerl Racing	73	Ford	DAY; 43	CAR; 39	LVS; 25	DAR; 22	BRI; 42	TEX; 38	TAL; 19	NSH; 35	CAL; 42	RCH	GTY; 20	NZH; 41	CLT; DNQ	DOV; 40	NSH; 13	KEN; 36	MLW; 26	DAY; DNQ	CHI; 39	NHA; 38	PPR; 28	IRP; 39	MCH; 34	BRI; 33			DOV; 34	KAN; 22	CLT; 29	MEM; 23	ATL; 38	PHO	CAR; DNQ	HOM; DNQ	28th	1765	
2003	Schuler Racing	67	Ford																									DAR; 34	RCH									28th	1765	
2004	Davis Motorsports	10	Chevy	DAY; 29	CAR; 27	LVS; 31	DAR; 32	BRI; 38	TEX; 41	NSH	TAL	CAL	GTY	RCH	NZH	CLT	DOV	NSH	KEN																			65th	421	
2004	Stanton Barrett Motorsports	97	Chevy																	MLW; 42	DAY	CHI	NHA	PPR	IRP	MCH	BRI	CAL	RCH	DOV	KAN	CLT	MEM	ATL	PHO	DAR	HOM	65th	421	
