= 2002 NASCAR Busch Series =

American motorsport season

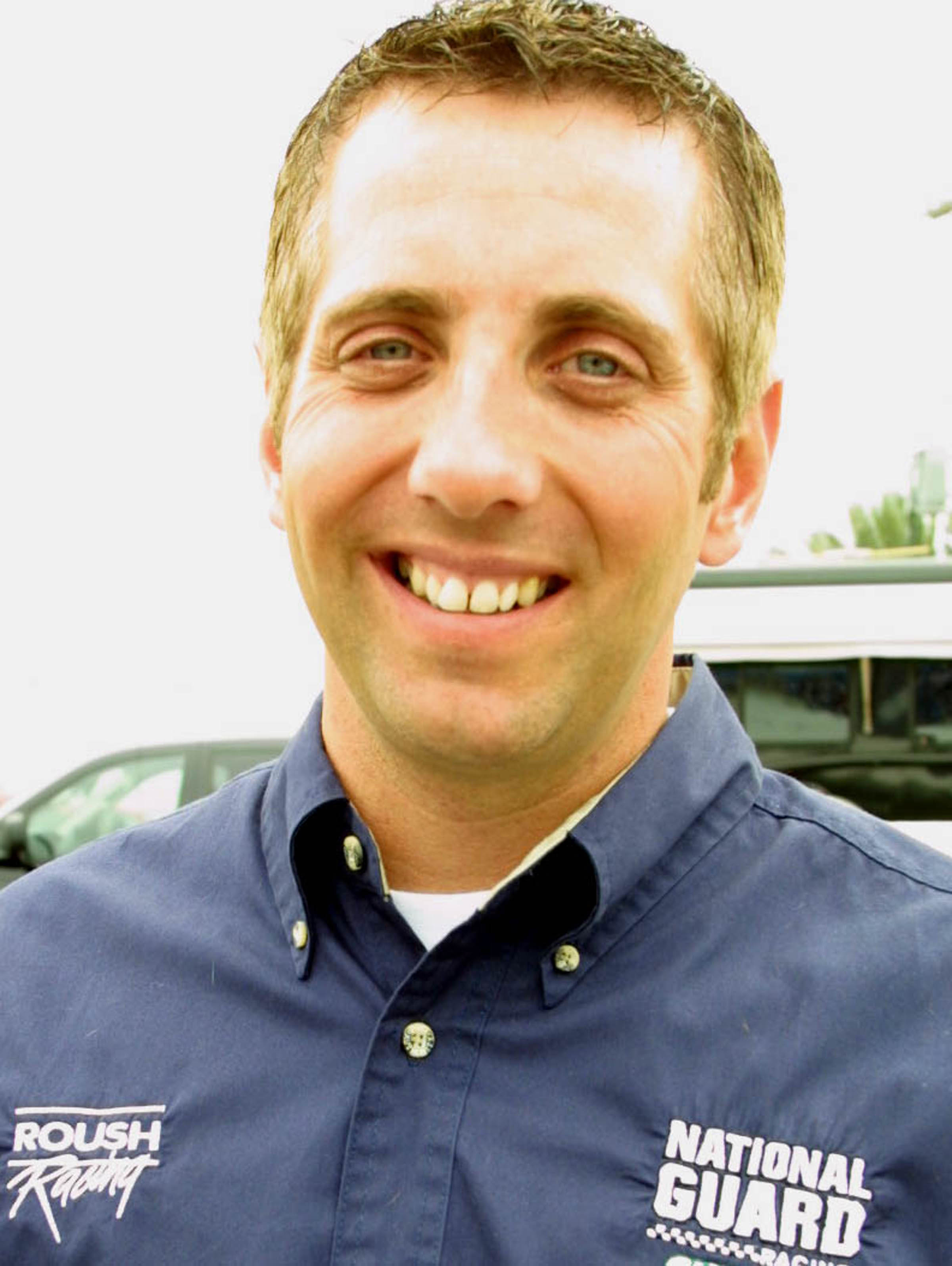
Greg Biffle, the 2002 Busch Series champion

The 2002 NASCAR Busch Series began February 16 and ended November 16. Greg Biffle of Roush Racing was crowned champion.

== Teams and drivers ==
=== Complete schedule ===
Team	Car(s)	No.	Driver(s)	Listed owner(s)	Crew chief
AP Performance Racing	Chevrolet Monte Carlo	19	Tim Sauter	Alec Pinsonneault	Joe Shear Jr.
BACE Motorsports	Chevrolet Monte Carlo; Pontiac Grand Prix	33	Tony Raines	Brian Baumgardner	Michael Kadlecik
Bill Davis Racing	Pontiac Grand Prix	23	Scott Wimmer	Gail Davis	Bootie Barker
Brewco Motorsports	Chevrolet Monte Carlo; Pontiac Grand Prix	27	Jamie McMurray	Tammy Brewer	Jason Ratcliff
Brewco Motorsports	Chevrolet Monte Carlo; Pontiac Grand Prix	37	Jeff Purvis 12	Clarence Brewer	Terry Shirley
Brewco Motorsports	Chevrolet Monte Carlo; Pontiac Grand Prix	37	Kevin Lepage 19	Clarence Brewer	Terry Shirley
Brewco Motorsports	Chevrolet Monte Carlo; Pontiac Grand Prix	37	Elton Sawyer 3	Clarence Brewer	Terry Shirley
Carroll Racing	Chevrolet Monte Carlo; Pontiac Grand Prix	26	Lyndon Amick 10	Dave Carroll	Todd Lohse
Carroll Racing	Chevrolet Monte Carlo; Pontiac Grand Prix	26	Ron Hornaday Jr. 24	Dave Carroll	Todd Lohse
Evans Motorsports	Chevrolet Monte Carlo	7	Randy LaJoie	Ed Evans	Wally Rogers
FitzBradshaw Racing	Chevrolet Monte Carlo	12	Kerry Earnhardt (R)	Armando Fitz	Bob Temple
Foyt Racing	Chevrolet Monte Carlo	14	Larry Foyt	A. J. Foyt	Jon Wolfe
Herzog-Jackson Motorsports	Chevrolet Monte Carlo	92	Andy Houston 3	William Herzog	Tony Liberati
Herzog-Jackson Motorsports	Chevrolet Monte Carlo	92	Todd Bodine 28	William Herzog	Tony Liberati
Herzog-Jackson Motorsports	Chevrolet Monte Carlo	92	Tim Fedewa 3	William Herzog	Tony Liberati
Hendrick Motorsports	Chevrolet Monte Carlo	5	Ricky Hendrick 22	Rick Hendrick	Lance McGrew
Hendrick Motorsports	Chevrolet Monte Carlo	5	Ron Hornaday Jr. 6	Rick Hendrick	Lance McGrew
Hendrick Motorsports	Chevrolet Monte Carlo	5	David Green 6	Rick Hendrick	Lance McGrew
Hendrick Motorsports	Chevrolet Monte Carlo	24	Jack Sprague	Rick Hendrick	Dennis Connor
Innovative Motorsports	Chevrolet Monte Carlo; Pontiac Grand Prix	47	Shane Hmiel (R)	George DeBidart	Gere Kennon
Innovative Motorsports	Chevrolet Monte Carlo; Pontiac Grand Prix	48	Kenny Wallace	Vicky DeBidart	Bobby Foley
Joe Gibbs Racing	Pontiac Grand Prix; Chevrolet Monte Carlo	18	Mike McLaughlin	Joe Gibbs	Tim Shutt
Hensley Motorsports	Chevrolet Monte Carlo	63	Shane Hall 24	Hubert Hensley	Kenneth Campbell
Hensley Motorsports	Chevrolet Monte Carlo	63	Ken Alexander 4	Hubert Hensley	Kenneth Campbell
Hensley Motorsports	Chevrolet Monte Carlo	63	Ron Young 6	Hubert Hensley	Kenneth Campbell
Lewis Motorsports	Chevrolet Monte Carlo	46	Ashton Lewis	William Lewis	Charlie Lewis
Moy Racing (Note: Entries were fielded in a collaboration with Means Racing.)	Ford Taurus	77	Andy Kirby 6 (Note: Andy Kirby qualified the No. 77 car at Texas (race #6) but he was replaced in the race by Brad Teague.)	Joe Reilly	Jimmy Means
Moy Racing	Ford Taurus	77	Brad Teague 7	Joe Reilly	Jimmy Means
Moy Racing	Ford Taurus	77	Jimmy Kitchens 12	Joe Reilly	Jimmy Means
Moy Racing	Ford Taurus	77	Bruce Bechtel 4	Joe Reilly	Jimmy Means
Moy Racing	Ford Taurus	77	Kertus Davis 1	Joe Reilly	Jimmy Means
Moy Racing	Ford Taurus	77	Eric Jones 1	Joe Reilly	Jimmy Means
Moy Racing	Ford Taurus	77	Donnie Neuenberger 1	Joe Reilly	Jimmy Means
Moy Racing	Ford Taurus	77	Dana White 3	Joe Reilly	Jimmy Means
ppc Racing	Ford Taurus	10	Scott Riggs (R)	Greg Pollex	Harold Holly
ppc Racing	Ford Taurus	57	Jason Keller	Keith Barnwell	Steve Addington
Richard Childress Racing	Chevrolet Monte Carlo	2	Johnny Sauter 33 (R)	Richard Childress	Ricky Viers
Richard Childress Racing	Chevrolet Monte Carlo	2	Jay Sauter 1	Richard Childress	Ricky Viers
Richard Childress Racing	Chevrolet Monte Carlo	21	Jeff Green 22	Richard Childress	Butch Hylton
Richard Childress Racing	Chevrolet Monte Carlo	21	Jay Sauter 12	Richard Childress	Butch Hylton
Roush Racing	Ford Taurus	60	Greg Biffle	Jack Roush	Randy Goss
ST Motorsports	Chevrolet Monte Carlo	59	Stacy Compton	Tad Geschickter	Butch Lamoreux
Team Bristol Motorsports	Chevrolet Monte Carlo	54	Kelly Denton 3 (Note: Kelly Denton qualified the No. 54 car at Las Vegas (race #3) but he was replaced in the race by Kevin Grubb.)	Rick Goodwin	Tony Lambert
Team Bristol Motorsports	Chevrolet Monte Carlo	54	Kevin Grubb 31 (Note: Kevin Grubb qualified the No. 54 car at Kansas (race #28) but he was replaced in the race by Tim Fedewa.)	Rick Goodwin	Tony Lambert
Team Bristol Motorsports	Chevrolet Monte Carlo	54	Tim Fedewa 1	Rick Goodwin	Tony Lambert
Team Bristol Motorsports	Chevrolet Monte Carlo	54	Jerry Nadeau 1	Rick Goodwin	Tony Lambert
Team Rensi Motorsports	Ford Taurus	25	Bobby Hamilton Jr.	Ed Rensi	Fred Wanke
Welliver-Jesel Motorsports	Dodge Intrepid	36	Hank Parker Jr.	Wayne Jesel	Gary Cogswell
Welliver-Jesel Motorsports	Dodge Intrepid	66	Casey Mears (R)	Wayne Jesel	Donnie Richeson

=== Limited Schedule ===
Note: If under "team", the owner's name is listed and in italics, that means the name of the race team that fielded the car is unknown.

Team	Car(s)	No.	Driver(s)	Listed Owner(s)	Crew Chief
Angela's Motorsports	Ford Taurus	02	Jay Sauter 2	Angela Harkness	Richard Lasater; Bobby Leslie
Akins Motorsports	Ford Taurus	38	Christian Elder 9 (Note: Christian Elder was scheduled to drive at Chicago (race #19) but he received career-ending injuries in a qualifying crash, and was replaced by Mark Green.)	Brad Akins	Wes Ward
Akins Motorsports	Ford Taurus	38	Mark Green 21	Brad Akins	Wes Ward
Alsup Racing	Chevrolet Monte Carlo	72	A. J. Alsup 1	William Alsup	N/A
BACE Motorsports	Chevrolet Monte Carlo; Pontiac Grand Prix	74	Chad Little 3	Bill Baumgardner	N/A
Baker Racing	Chevrolet Monte Carlo	28	Brad Baker 7	Gary Baker	Randy Seals 6 Joe Ruttman 1
Bennett Motorsports	Chevrolet Monte Carlo	02	Lowell Bennett 2	Lowell Bennett	N/A
Bennett Motorsports	Chevrolet Monte Carlo	22	Lowell Bennett 1	Lowell Bennett	N/A
Biagi Brothers Racing	Pontiac Grand Prix	07	Tim Fedewa 1	Fred Biagi	N/A
Biagi Brothers Racing	Pontiac Grand Prix; Chevrolet Monte Carlo	4	Mike Wallace 20	Fred Biagi	N/A
Big Fan Racing	Chevrolet Monte Carlo	89	Lance Hooper 2	Mark Watkins	N/A
BLV Motorsports	Dodge Intrepid	40	Brian Vickers (R) 22	Clyde Vickers	Patrick Donahue
Brett Bodine Racing	Ford Taurus	11	Josh Richeson 9	Brett Bodine	N/A
CDS Racing	Chevrolet Monte Carlo	09	Clay Dale 2	David Gregory	N/A
Conely Racing	Chevrolet Monte Carlo	0	Bryan Reffner 1	John Conely	N/A
Conely Racing	Chevrolet Monte Carlo	07	Bryan Reffner 1	John Conely	N/A
Conely Racing	Chevrolet Monte Carlo	70	Bryan Reffner 1	John Conely	N/A
Creech Motorsports	Pontiac Grand Prix; Dodge Intrepid	22	Billy Morris III 1	Robert Creech	N/A
Creech Motorsports	Pontiac Grand Prix; Dodge Intrepid	22	Shayne Lockhart 1	Robert Creech	N/A
Creech Motorsports	Pontiac Grand Prix; Dodge Intrepid	22	Carl Long 1	Robert Creech	N/A
Cunningham Motorsports	Dodge Intrepid	04	Justin Labonte 3	Kerry Scherer	N/A
Curb Racing	Chevrolet Monte Carlo	43	Hermie Sadler 4	Mike Curb	N/A
Dale Earnhardt, Inc.	Chevrolet Monte Carlo	8	Dale Earnhardt Jr. 1	Teresa Earnhardt	N/A
Dan Kinney	Chevrolet Monte Carlo	85	John Hayden 3	Dan Kinney	N/A
Danford Motorsports	Ford Taurus	41	Austin Cameron 1	Fred Bickford	N/A
DF2 Motorsports	Chevrolet Monte Carlo	4	Kevin Prince 1	Danny Bost	N/A
DF2 Motorsports	Chevrolet Monte Carlo	4	Phil Bonifield 1	Fred Bickford	N/A
DF2 Motorsports	Chevrolet Monte Carlo	9	Carl Edwards 1	Fred Bickford	N/A
DF2 Motorsports	Chevrolet Monte Carlo	9	Brent Glastetter 1	Fred Bickford	N/A
DF2 Motorsports	Chevrolet Monte Carlo	34	Jason White 1	Fred Bickford	Larry Carter
DF2 Motorsports	Chevrolet Monte Carlo	34	Jason White 1	Fred Bickford	N/A
DF2 Motorsports	Chevrolet Monte Carlo	34	Mike Johnson 1	Fred Bickford	N/A
DF2 Motorsports	Chevrolet Monte Carlo	34	Daniel Johnson 1	Fred Bickford	N/A
DF2 Motorsports	Chevrolet Monte Carlo	94	Jeff Spraker 2	Fred Bickford	Matt Groeschl
DF2 Motorsports	Chevrolet Monte Carlo	94	Daniel Johnson 2	Fred Bickford	Matt Groeschl
DF2 Motorsports	Chevrolet Monte Carlo	94	Derrike Cope 5	Fred Bickford	Matt Groeschl
DF2 Motorsports	Chevrolet Monte Carlo	94	Rick Markle 1	Fred Bickford	Matt Groeschl
DF2 Motorsports	Chevrolet Monte Carlo	94	Andy Kirby 3	Fred Bickford	Matt Groeschl
DF2 Motorsports	Chevrolet Monte Carlo	94	Jason White 3	Fred Bickford	Matt Groeschl
DF2 Motorsports	Chevrolet Monte Carlo	94	Larry Gunselman 16	Fred Bickford	Matt Groeschl
Davis Motorsports	Chevrolet Monte Carlo	0	Kertus Davis 6	Johnny Davis	N/A
Davis Motorsports	Chevrolet Monte Carlo	0	Brad Teague 1	Johnny Davis	N/A
Day Enterprise Racing	Pontiac Grand Prix; Chevrolet Monte Carlo	16	Chad Chaffin 28	Wayne Day	Ronnie Pendelton
Day Enterprise Racing	Pontiac Grand Prix	61	Justin Ashburn 1	Wayne Day	N/A
Del Markle	Pontiac Grand Prix	96	Rick Markle 1	Del Markle	N/A
DRT Enterprises	Ford Taurus	15	Tim Bainey Jr. 2	Tim Bainey Sr.	N/A
E. E. Sawyer	Chevrolet Monte Carlo	41	Chris Fontaine 3	E. E. Sawyer	N/A
Frank Cicci Racing	Chevrolet Monte Carlo	34	Mike Laughlin Jr. 1	Frank Cicci	Larry Carter
Frank Cicci Racing	Chevrolet Monte Carlo	34	Stuart Kirby 8	Frank Cicci	Larry Carter
Frank Cicci Racing	Chevrolet Monte Carlo	34	Steve Grissom 7	Frank Cicci	Larry Carter
Gerald Wittman	Ford Taurus	93	Wayman Wittman 1	Gerald Wittman	N/A
GIC-Mixon Motorsports	Chevrolet Monte Carlo	44	Mike Harmon 33	Gregg Mixon	Dave Raney
GIC-Mixon Motorsports	Chevrolet Monte Carlo	72	Rick Markle 1	Gregg Mixon	N/A
GIC-Mixon Motorsports	Chevrolet Monte Carlo	72	Jimmy Kitchens 1	Gregg Mixon	N/A
Glenn Racing	Dodge Intrepid	64	Carl Long 1	Ana Glenn	N/A
Havill-Spoerl Racing	Ford Taurus	73	Jason Schuler 12	Daryl Spoerl	N/A
Havill-Spoerl Racing	Ford Taurus	85	Nick Woodward 1	Daryl Spoerl	N/A
Havill-Spoerl Racing	Ford Taurus	85	Brad Mueller 1	Daryl Spoerl	N/A
Havill-Spoerl Racing	Ford Taurus	85	Josh Richeson 2	Daryl Spoerl	N/A
Henderson Motorsports	Chevrolet Monte Carlo	75	Butch Miller 11	Charlie Henderson	N/A
Hispanic Racing Team	Chevrolet Monte Carlo	09	David Green 2	Rudy Rodriguez	N/A
Hispanic Racing Team	Chevrolet Monte Carlo	09	Roberto Guerrero 1	Rudy Rodriguez	N/A
Hispanic Racing Team	Chevrolet Monte Carlo	09	Carlos Contreras 1	Rudy Rodriguez	N/A
Hoff Motorsports	Pontiac Grand Prix	93	Bill Hoff 6	Jeffrey Shutt	N/A
Jay Robinson Racing	Ford Taurus	49	Kirk Shelmerdine 1	Jay Robinson	Jay Robinson
Jay Robinson Racing	Ford Taurus	49	Robbie Faggart 2	Jay Robinson	Jay Robinson
Jay Robinson Racing	Ford Taurus	49	Craig Raudman 1	Jay Robinson	Jay Robinson
Jay Robinson Racing	Ford Taurus	49	Joe Buford 11	Jay Robinson	Jay Robinson
Jay Robinson Racing	Ford Taurus	49	David Starr 1	Jay Robinson	Jay Robinson
Jay Robinson Racing	Ford Taurus	49	Andy Kirby 4	Jay Robinson	Jay Robinson
Jay Robinson Racing	Ford Taurus	49	Troy Cline 3	Jay Robinson	Jay Robinson
Jay Robinson Racing	Ford Taurus	49	Nick Woodward 2	Jay Robinson	Jay Robinson
Jay Robinson Racing	Ford Taurus	49	Dan Pardus (R) 1	Jay Robinson	Jay Robinson
Jay Robinson Racing	Chevrolet Monte Carlo	49	Dan Shaver 2	Jay Robinson	Jay Robinson
Jay Robinson Racing	Ford Taurus	49	Sammy Potashnick 1 (Note: Sammy Potashnick qualified the No. 49 car at Bristol II (race #24) but he was replaced in the race by Derrike Cope.)	Jay Robinson	Jay Robinson
Jay Robinson Racing	Chevrolet Monte Carlo	49	Rick Markle 1	Jay Robinson	Jay Robinson
Jay Robinson Racing	Ford Taurus 1 Chevrolet Monte Carlo 2	49	Derrike Cope 3	Jay Robinson	Jay Robinson
Jim & Judie Motorsports	Chevrolet Monte Carlo	32	Dan Pardus (R) 17	Jim Gardner	Greg Conner
Joe Bessey Motorsports	Chevrolet Monte Carlo	6	Joe Bessey 2	Joe Bessey	N/A
Jimmy Craig	Chevrolet Monte Carlo	86	Jeff Fultz 7 Jimmy Craig	N/A	
Joe Gibbs Racing	Pontiac Grand Prix; Chevrolet Monte Carlo	20	Coy Gibbs 5	Joe Gibbs	N/A
John Josey	Chevrolet Monte Carlo	86	Robby Benton 1	John Josey	N/A
Jules Bickel	Ford Taurus	62	Brian Ross 2	Jules Bickel	N/A
Ken Schrader Racing	Chevrolet Monte Carlo	07	Ken Schrader 2	Ken Schrader	N/A
Ken Schrader Racing	Chevrolet Monte Carlo	07	Michael Vergers 2	Ken Schrader	N/A
KLM Motorsports	Chevrolet Monte Carlo	79	Keith Murt 2	Keith Murt	N/A
Lavender Racing	Chevrolet Monte Carlo	08	Jody Lavender 1	Joe Lavender	N/A
Leik Motorsports	Chevrolet Monte Carlo	81	Dwayne Leik 7	Dwayne Leik	N/A
Mac Hill Motorsports	Chevrolet Monte Carlo	56	Richard Mitchell 7	John McNelly	N/A
MacDonald Motorsports	Chevrolet Monte Carlo	55	Michael Dokken 1	Marrill MacDonald	N/A
Marsh Racing	Chevrolet Monte Carlo	31	Johnny Benson Jr. 1	Ted Marsh	Ted Marsh
Marsh Racing	Chevrolet Monte Carlo	31	David Green 3	Ted Marsh	Ted Marsh
Marsh Racing	Chevrolet Monte Carlo	31	Tim Fedewa 3	Ted Marsh	Ted Marsh
Marsh Racing	Chevrolet Monte Carlo	31	Dave Blaney 1	Ted Marsh	Ted Marsh
Martyn Glidden	Ford Taurus	84	Dion Ciccarelli 7	Martyn Glidden	N/A
Matrix Motorsports	Ford Taurus	71	Kevin Lepage 5	Kevin Lepage	Richard Lasater
Means Racing	Ford Taurus	52	Brad Teague 11	Jimmy Means	N/A
Means Racing	Ford Taurus	52	Jimmy Kitchens 2	Jimmy Means	N/A
Means Racing	Ford Taurus	52	Scott Gaylord 1	Jimmy Means	N/A
Means Racing	Ford Taurus	52	Phil Bonifield 3	Jimmy Means	N/A
Means Racing	Ford Taurus	52	Eric Jones 1	Jimmy Means	N/A
Means Racing	Ford Taurus	52	Donnie Neuenberger 1	Jimmy Means	N/A
Means Racing	Ford Taurus	52	Ryck Sanders 1	Jimmy Means	N/A
Means Racing	Ford Taurus	52	Cam Strader 3	Jimmy Means	N/A
Michael Waltrip Racing	Chevrolet Monte Carlo	99	Michael Waltrip 19	Michael Waltrip	Bobby Kennedy
NEMCO Motorsports	Pontiac Grand Prix; Chevrolet Monte Carlo	87	Joe Nemechek 14 (Note: David Reutimann qualified the No. 87 car at Kentucky (race #16) for Joe Nemechek.)	Joe Nemechek	Brian Pattie
NEMCO Motorsports	Pontiac Grand Prix; Chevrolet Monte Carlo	87	David Reutimann 3	Joe Nemechek	Brian Pattie
NEMCO Motorsports	Pontiac Grand Prix; Chevrolet Monte Carlo	87	Tim Fedewa 1	Joe Nemechek	Brian Pattie
NEMCO Motorsports	Chevrolet Monte Carlo; Pontiac Grand Prix	88	Jeff Fuller 3	Joe Nemechek	N/A
NEMCO Motorsports	Chevrolet Monte Carlo; Pontiac Grand Prix	88	David Reutimann 2	Joe Nemechek	N/A
Norm Benning Racing	Chevrolet Monte Carlo	8	Norm Benning 1	Norm Benning	N/A
ORTEC Racing	Chevrolet Monte Carlo	96	Gus Wasson 2	Julian Burgess	N/A
ORTEC Racing	Chevrolet Monte Carlo	96	Brad Baker 1	Julian Burgess	N/A
ORTEC Racing	Chevrolet Monte Carlo	96	Brent Moore 1	Julian Burgess	N/A
Phoenix Racing	Chevrolet Monte Carlo; Pontiac Grand Prix	1	Jimmy Spencer 23	James Finch	Marc Reno
Phoenix Racing	Chevrolet Monte Carlo; Pontiac Grand Prix	1	Martin Truex Jr. 1	James Finch	Marc Reno
Phoenix Racing	Pontiac Grand Prix	51	Joe Ruttman 1	James Finch	N/A
Phoenix Racing	Ford Taurus	51	Geoff Bodine 1	James Finch	N/A
ppc Racing	Ford Taurus; Pontiac Grand Prix	15	Lyndon Amick 2	Harold Holly	N/A
Reiser Enterprises	Ford Taurus	17	Matt Kenseth 4	Robbie Reiser	N/A
Richard Childress Racing	Chevrolet Monte Carlo	3	Dale Earnhardt Jr. 2	Richard Childress	N/A
Richard Childress Racing	Chevrolet Monte Carlo	29	Kevin Harvick 4	Richard Childress	N/A
Richard Childress Racing	Chevrolet Monte Carlo	29	Jim Sauter 1	Richard Childress	N/A
Richard Jarvis	Chevrolet Monte Carlo	64	Richard Jarvis Jr. 2	Richard Jarvis	N/A
Robert Yates Racing	Ford Taurus	98	Kasey Kahne (R) 21	Robert Yates	Tommy Morgan; Clyde McLeod
Roush Racing	Ford Taurus	9	Jeff Burton 13	Jack Roush	Brad Parrott
Roush Racing	Ford Taurus	9	Jon Wood 1	Jack Roush	Brad Parrott
Sadler Brothers Racing	Ford Taurus	95	Steadman Marlin 9	The Sadler Brothers	N/A
Sadler Brothers Racing	Ford Taurus	95	Jason White 1	The Sadler Brothers	N/A
Santerre Racing	Chevrolet Monte Carlo	01	Andy Santerre 2	Andy Santerre	N/A
SCORE Motorsports	Chevrolet Monte Carlo	02	Hermie Sadler 3	Hermie Sadler	N/A
Sellers Racing	Chevrolet Monte Carlo	15	Jack Sellers 1	Jack Sellers	N/A
SKI Motorsports	Chevrolet Monte Carlo	30	Christian Fittipaldi 5 (Note: Christian Fittipaldi qualified the No. 30 car at Memphis (race #30) but he was replaced in the race by Chad Chaffin who failed to qualify his regular No. 16 car.)	Chris Lencheski	N/A
SKI Motorsports	Chevrolet Monte Carlo	30	Chad Chaffin 1	Chris Lencheski	N/A
Smith Brothers Motorsports	Chevrolet Monte Carlo; Pontiac Grand Prix	67	C. W. Smith 4	Mike Smith	N/A
Stanton Barrett Motorsports	Chevrolet Monte Carlo; Ford Taurus	91	Stanton Barrett 14	Stanton Barrett	N/A
Team Racing	Pontiac Grand Prix	90	Phil Bonifield 4	Phil Bonifield	N/A
Tennessee Mountain Boys Racing	Chevrolet Monte Carlo	53	Butch Jarvis 2	William Jarvis	N/A
Toby Robertson	Chevrolet Monte Carlo	13	Toby Robertson 1	Toby Robertson	N/A
Tommy Baldwin Racing	Dodge Intrepid	6	David Green 1	Tommy Baldwin Jr.	N/A
Tommy Baldwin Racing	Dodge Intrepid	6	Wally Dallenbach Jr. 3	Tommy Baldwin Jr.	N/A
Tommy Baldwin Racing	Dodge Intrepid	6	Damon Lusk 2	Tommy Baldwin Jr.	N/A
Truex Motorsports	Chevrolet Monte Carlo	56	Martin Truex Jr. 2	Martin Truex Sr.	N/A
Truex Motorsports	Chevrolet Monte Carlo	58	Martin Truex Jr. 2	Martin Truex Sr.	N/A
Tuttle Motorsports	Chevrolet Monte Carlo	97	P. J. Jones 1	Dexter Tuttle	N/A
Weber Racing	Chevrolet Monte Carlo	8	Brian Weber 4	Brian Weber	N/A
Weber Racing	Chevrolet Monte Carlo	8	Jeff Spraker 1	Brian Weber	N/A
Weber Racing	Chevrolet Monte Carlo	8	Larry Gunselman 1	Brian Weber	N/A
Weber Racing	Chevrolet Monte Carlo	84	Brian Weber 12	Brian Weber	N/A
Weber Racing	Chevrolet Monte Carlo	84	Larry Gunselman 3	Brian Weber	N/A
Weber Racing	Chevrolet Monte Carlo	84	Cam Strader 1	Brian Weber	N/A
Weber Racing	Chevrolet Monte Carlo	84	Shane Hall 1	Brian Weber	N/A
Weber Racing	Chevrolet Monte Carlo	84	Rick Markle 1	Brian Weber	N/A
Weber Racing	Chevrolet Monte Carlo	84	Joe Buford 1	Brian Weber	N/A
Weber Racing	Chevrolet Monte Carlo	84	Jody Lavender 1	Brian Weber	N/A
Weber Racing	Chevrolet Monte Carlo	84	Jimmy Kitchens 1	Brian Weber	N/A
Welliver-Jesel Motorsports	Chevrolet Monte Carlo	86	Mike Laughlin Jr. 1	Wayne Jesel	Clyde McLeod
Wellrich Motorsports	Chevrolet Monte Carlo	07	Regan Smith 1	Ed Whitaker	N/A
White Motorsports	Chevrolet Monte Carlo	22	David Ray Boggs 1	Drew White	N/A
White Motorsports	Chevrolet Monte Carlo	22	Larry Hollenbeck 1	George White	N/A
White Motorsports	Chevrolet Monte Carlo	22	Drew White 1	George White	N/A
Young Racing	Chevrolet Monte Carlo	70	Ron Young 1	Jerry Young	N/A
Young Racing	Chevrolet Monte Carlo	71	Ron Young 9	Jerry Young	N/A

== Races ==
=== EAS/GNC Live Well 300 ===
The EAS/GNC Live Well 300 was held February 16 at Daytona International Speedway. Joe Nemechek won the pole.

Top ten results

1. #3 - Dale Earnhardt Jr.
2. #99 - Michael Waltrip
3. #17 - Matt Kenseth
4. #57 - Jason Keller
5. #47 - Shane Hmiel
6. #10 - Scott Riggs
7. #24 - Jack Sprague
8. #71 - Kevin Lepage
9. #92 - Andy Houston
10. #48 - Kenny Wallace

Failed to qualify: Dan Pardus (#32), Mike Wallace (#4), C. W. Smith (#67), Mike Harmon (#44), David Ray Boggs (#22)

- Dale Earnhardt Jr.'s #3 car marked the first race for the #3 since the tragic 2001 Daytona 500. Junior would also run the #3 at Charlotte in May.

=== 1-866RBCTerm.com 200 ===
The 1-866RBCTerm.com 200 was held February 23 at North Carolina Speedway. Jeff Green won the pole.

Top ten results

1. #57 - Jason Keller
2. #60 - Greg Biffle
3. #7 - Randy LaJoie
4. #10 - Scott Riggs
5. #18 - Mike McLaughlin
6. #24 - Jack Sprague
7. #1 - Jimmy Spencer
8. #46 - Ashton Lewis
9. #33 - Tony Raines
10. #14 - Larry Foyt

Failed to qualify: Cam Strader (#84), Lance Hooper (#89)

- Sammy Potashnick was scheduled to drive the #49 but he was arrested earlier that week and he was replaced in the race by Robbie Faggart.

=== Sam's Town 300 ===
The Sam's Town 300 was held March 2 at Las Vegas Motor Speedway. Jeff Burton won the pole.

Top ten results

1. #9 - Jeff Burton
2. #99 - Michael Waltrip
3. #2 - Johnny Sauter
4. #71 - Kevin Lepage
5. #21 - Jeff Green
6. #24 - Jack Sprague
7. #7 - Randy LaJoie
8. #48 - Kenny Wallace
9. #60 - Greg Biffle
10. #59 - Stacy Compton

Failed to qualify: Jeff Fuller (#88), Mike Laughlin Jr. (#34), A. J. Alsup (#72), Mike Harmon (#44), Dion Ciccarelli (#84)

- Ricky Hendrick suffered a broken shoulder in a late-race crash with Tony Raines, and would sit out the next six races. Ron Hornaday Jr. would drive the #5 Chevrolet during that time.
- Kelly Denton qualified the #54 but he was replaced in the race by Kevin Grubb.

=== darlingtonraceway.com 200 ===
The darlingtonraceway.com 200 was held March 16 at Darlington Raceway. Jeff Burton won the pole, and led every single lap on his way to the victory.

Top ten results

1. #9 - Jeff Burton
2. #60 - Greg Biffle
3. #21 - Jeff Green
4. #57 - Jason Keller
5. #48 - Kenny Wallace
6. #18 - Mike McLaughlin
7. #33 - Tony Raines
8. #92 - Todd Bodine
9. #24 - Jack Sprague
10. #59 - Stacy Compton

Failed to qualify: Phil Bonifield (#90), Shane Hall (#84)

=== Channellock 250 ===
The Channellock 250 was held March 23 at Bristol Motor Speedway. Scott Riggs won the pole. This race was known for several major story lines. There were two separate altercations post-race, the most notable being a physical confrontation between Kevin Harvick and Greg Biffle following an incident between the two drivers on lap 241 in which Harvick crashed hard; Harvick was placed on probation for the incident, which saw him being parked from the Virginia 500 Cup Series race when he collided against Coy Gibbs during the Truck Series race at Martinsville, in violation of the probation.

The other happening just on the other end of pit road in a verbal confrontation between Jimmy Spencer and Jack Sprague after Spencer turned Sprague, who was five laps down, in the last turn on the last lap while chasing down Jeff Green for the win. Green would ultimately win while Spencer lost two spots in that incident to drop to fourth. It was also known for privateer driver Ken Alexander and rookie Johnny Sauter causing or getting caught up in multiple incidents with Alexander being a nuisance on the track throughout the race, both finally dropping out before the race's end as well as a hard crash on the last lap between Mark Green and Larry Foyt with Green suffering a broken left foot.

Top ten results

1. #21 - Jeff Green
2. #18 - Mike McLaughlin
3. #23 - Scott Wimmer
4. #1 - Jimmy Spencer
5. #60 - Greg Biffle
6. #48 - Kenny Wallace
7. #7 - Randy LaJoie
8. #92 - Todd Bodine
9. #10 - Scott Riggs
10. #47 - Shane Hmiel

Failed to qualify: none

=== O'Reilly 300 ===
The O'Reilly 300 was held April 6 at Texas Motor Speedway. Jeff Green won the pole. The race ended after 116 laps due to rain. Michael Waltrip flipped over on lap 45. He was uninjured.

Top ten results

1. #37 - Jeff Purvis*
2. #24 - Jack Sprague
3. #87 - Joe Nemechek
4. #10 - Scott Riggs
5. #21 - Jeff Green
6. #29 - Kevin Harvick
7. #7 - Randy LaJoie
8. #25 - Bobby Hamilton Jr.
9. #17 - Matt Kenseth
10. #9 - Jeff Burton

Failed to qualify: Dan Pardus (#32), Mike Harmon (#44), Jason Schuler (#73), Dwayne Leik (#81)

- Andy Kirby qualified the #77 but he was replaced in the race by Brad Teague.
- This was Purvis' final career victory before his hard crash at Nazareth.

=== Pepsi 300 presented by Kroger ===
The Pepsi 300 presented by Kroger was held April 13 at Nashville Superspeedway. Shane Hmiel won the pole.

Top ten results

1. #10 - Scott Riggs*
2. #24 - Jack Sprague
3. #25 - Bobby Hamilton Jr.
4. #23 - Scott Wimmer
5. #57 - Jason Keller
6. #7 - Randy LaJoie
7. #27 - Jamie McMurray
8. #12 - Kerry Earnhardt
9. #59 - Stacy Compton*
10. #19 - Tim Sauter

Failed to qualify: none

- Mike Chase qualified the #59 for Stacy Compton.
- This was Riggs' first career Busch Series victory.

=== Aaron's 312 at Talladega ===
The Aaron's 312 at Talladega was held April 20 at Talladega Superspeedway. Johnny Sauter won the pole. The race was most remembered for "the Big One" on lap 15 which was the largest crash in series history, which involved about 30 cars. This occurred when Shane Hmiel got into Scott Riggs and he hit Johnny Sauter. Sauter tumbled end over end while cars trying to avoid the wreck braked and slammed into each other. Only three cars finished on the lead lap. Third place Tim Fedewa was a last minute entry in a second Biagi Brothers Racing entry.

Top ten results

1. #57 - Jason Keller
2. #59 - Stacy Compton
3. #07 - Tim Fedewa
4. #92 - Todd Bodine
5. #66 - Casey Mears
6. #49 - Andy Kirby
7. #77 - Jimmy Kitchens
8. #14 - Larry Foyt
9. #48 - Kenny Wallace
10. #36 - Hank Parker Jr.

Failed to qualify: Rick Markle (#96)

- Kenny Wallace finished ninth, despite failing to finish due to a blown engine with ten laps to go.

=== Auto Club 300 ===
The Auto Club 300 was held April 27 at California Speedway. Jack Sprague won the pole.

Top ten results

1. #10 - Scott Riggs
2. #21 - Jeff Green
3. #59 - Stacy Compton
4. #24 - Jack Sprague
5. #57 - Jason Keller
6. #18 - Mike McLaughlin
7. #19 - Tim Sauter
8. #99 - Michael Waltrip
9. #7 - Randy LaJoie
10. #60 - Greg Biffle

Failed to qualify: Jack Sellers (#15)

=== Hardee's 250 ===
The Hardee's 250 was held May 3 at Richmond International Raceway. Jack Sprague won the pole.

Top ten results

1. #57 - Jason Keller
2. #46 - Ashton Lewis
3. #60 - Greg Biffle
4. #99 - Michael Waltrip
5. #54 - Kevin Grubb
6. #36 - Hank Parker Jr.
7. #40 - Brian Vickers
8. #23 - Scott Wimmer
9. #27 - Jamie McMurray
10. #19 - Tim Sauter

Failed to qualify: Christian Fittipaldi (#30), Ron Young (#71), Toby Robertson (#13), Billy Morris III (#22), Brian Weber (#8)

- Johnny Benson Jr. crashed hard in turn 3 early in the race. He suffered broken ribs, causing him to miss 3 Winston Cup races.
- Ricky Hendrick returned to driving in this race after his crash at Las Vegas back in March.

=== Busch 200 ===
The Busch 200 was held May 11 at New Hampshire International Speedway. Shane Hmiel won the pole.

Top ten results

1. #25 - Bobby Hamilton Jr.*
2. #92 - Todd Bodine
3. #24 - Jack Sprague
4. #47 - Shane Hmiel
5. #18 - Mike McLaughlin
6. #7 - Randy LaJoie
7. #10 - Scott Riggs
8. #36 - Hank Parker Jr.
9. #27 - Jamie McMurray
10. #54 - Kevin Grubb

Failed to qualify: none

- This was Hamilton Jr.'s first career victory.

=== Stacker 2 200 ===
The Stacker 2 200 was held May 18 at Nazareth Speedway. Jack Sprague won the pole. The race is known for a severe crash by Jeff Purvis, who blew his engine, spun out, and was slammed into by Greg Biffle, causing severe head trauma. Purvis has never fully recovered from the injuries he suffered, although he would return to drive a NASCAR stock car two years later at the final Busch race at Nazareth.

Top ten results

1. #57 - Jason Keller
2. #10 - Scott Riggs
3. #26 - Ron Hornaday Jr.
4. #27 - Jamie McMurray
5. #7 - Randy LaJoie
6. #25 - Bobby Hamilton Jr.
7. #21 - Jay Sauter
8. #46 - Ashton Lewis
9. #18 - Mike McLaughlin
10. #33 - Tony Raines

Failed to qualify: none

- Mike Johnson qualified the #34 for Daniel Johnson.

=== Carquest Auto Parts 300 ===
The Carquest Auto Parts 300 was held May 25 at Lowe's Motor Speedway. Ron Hornaday Jr. won the pole.

Top ten results

1. #21 - Jeff Green
2. #60 - Greg Biffle
3. #10 - Scott Riggs
4. #18 - Mike McLaughlin
5. #92 - Todd Bodine
6. #37 - Kevin Lepage
7. #25 - Bobby Hamilton Jr.
8. #54 - Kevin Grubb
9. #2 - Jay Sauter*
10. #24 - Jack Sprague

Failed to qualify: Christian Fittipaldi (#30), Carl Long (#64), Stanton Barrett (#91), Larry Gunselman (#84), Phil Bonifield (#90)

- Jay Sauter ran the #2 replacing Johnny Sauter due to health concerns.
- This was Jeff Green's final career win.

=== MBNA Platinum 200 ===
The MBNA Platinum 200 was held June 1 at Dover International Speedway. Jeff Green won the pole.

Top ten results

1. #60 - Greg Biffle
2. #21 - Jeff Green
3. #25 - Bobby Hamilton Jr.
4. #23 - Scott Wimmer
5. #24 - Jack Sprague
6. #26 - Ron Hornaday Jr.
7. #48 - Kenny Wallace
8. #18 - Mike McLaughlin
9. #7 - Randy LaJoie
10. #54 - Kevin Grubb

Failed to qualify: none

=== Inside Traxx 300 presented by Met-Rx ===
The Inside Traxx 300 presented by Met-Rx was held June 8 at Nashville Superspeedway. Greg Biffle won the pole.

Top ten results

1. #24 - Jack Sprague
2. #25 - Bobby Hamilton Jr.
3. #60 - Greg Biffle
4. #21 - Jay Sauter
5. #57 - Jason Keller
6. #48 - Kenny Wallace
7. #23 - Scott Wimmer
8. #36 - Hank Parker Jr.
9. #47 - Shane Hmiel
10. #66 - Casey Mears

Failed to qualify: Jason Schuler (#73), Jeff Fultz (#86), Nick Woodward (#85), Kevin Prince (#4)

- David Green qualified the #59 for Stacy Compton.

=== Kroger 300 presented by Oreo ===
The Kroger 300 presented by Oreo was held June 15 but finished on June 16 at Kentucky Speedway due to rain. Scott Riggs won the pole. The race was delayed a day by rain, but the broadcast of the race was aired on tape delay because of a NASCAR rule prohibiting two national series from being broadcast simultaneously.

Top ten results

1. #92 - Todd Bodine
2. #60 - Greg Biffle
3. #33 - Tony Raines
4. #10 - Scott Riggs
5. #23 - Scott Wimmer
6. #27 - Jamie McMurray
7. #12 - Kerry Earnhardt
8. #5 - Ricky Hendrick
9. #48 - Kenny Wallace
10. #63 - Shane Hall

Failed to qualify: Chad Chaffin (#16), Brad Baker (#96), Dwayne Leik (#81), Jeff Fultz (#86), Dion Ciccarelli (#84), Brian Weber (#8), Jason Schuler (#73)

- Mark Green qualified the #59 for Stacy Compton and David Reutimann qualified the #87 for Joe Nemechek.

=== GNC Live Well 250 ===
The GNC Live Well 250 was held June 30 at The Milwaukee Mile. Greg Biffle won the pole.

Top ten results

1. #60 - Greg Biffle
2. #57 - Jason Keller
3. #23 - Scott Wimmer
4. #26 - Ron Hornaday Jr.
5. #33 - Tony Raines
6. #63 - Shane Hmiel
7. #25 - Bobby Hamilton Jr.
8. #18 - Mike McLaughlin
9. #19 - Tim Sauter
10. #7 - Randy LaJoie

Failed to qualify: Brian Ross (#62)

- 59-year old Jim Sauter entered this race alongside his sons Johnny, Jay, and Tim, making this only time in NASCAR history where a father raced against three of his sons. Jim, Johnny, and Jay all drove for Richard Childress Racing.

=== Stacker 2/GNC Live Well 250 ===
The Stacker 2/GNC Live Well 250 was held July 5 at Daytona International Speedway. Joe Nemechek won the pole.

Top ten results

1. #87 - Joe Nemechek
2. #60 - Greg Biffle*
3. #37 - Kevin Lepage
4. #57 - Jason Keller
5. #27 - Jamie McMurray
6. #2 - Johnny Sauter
7. #18 - Mike McLaughlin
8. #1 - Jimmy Spencer
9. #54 - Kevin Grubb
10. #59 - Stacy Compton

Failed to qualify: none

- Greg Biffle would take the points lead from Jack Sprague after this race, as Sprague finished 28th after being collected in a 14-car pileup with five laps to go. Biffle would hold the championship lead for the rest of the season.

=== Tropicana Twister 300 ===
The Tropicana Twister 300 was held July 13 at Chicagoland Speedway. Todd Bodine won the pole. Christian Elder and Dan Pardus were involved in large accidents during qualifying. Elder sustained a concussion and a broken collarbone, which effectively ended his racing career while Pardus escaped his crash uninjured.

Top ten results

1. #2 - Johnny Sauter
2. #92 - Todd Bodine
3. #9 - Jeff Burton
4. #87 - Joe Nemechek
5. #26 - Ron Hornaday Jr.
6. #1 - Jimmy Spencer
7. #21 - Jeff Green
8. #60 - Greg Biffle
9. #25 - Bobby Hamilton Jr.
10. #57 - Jason Keller

Failed to qualify: Richard Mitchell (#56), Steadman Marlin (#95), Larry Hollenbeck (#22), Dan Pardus (#32), Jason Schuler (#73)

- Mark Green would drive the #38 for the rest of the season after Elder's qualifying accident.

=== Charter Pipeline 250 ===
The Charter Pipeline 250 was held July 20 at Gateway International Raceway. Randy LaJoie won the pole. The week was marked by tragedy as Andy Kirby was killed in a motorcycle accident on July 18.

Top ten results

1. #60 - Greg Biffle
2. #26 - Ron Hornaday Jr.
3. #54 - Kevin Grubb
4. #24 - Jack Sprague
5. #33 - Tony Raines
6. #57 - Jason Keller
7. #18 - Mike McLaughlin
8. #27 - Jamie McMurray
9. #37 - Kevin Lepage
10. #19 - Tim Sauter

Failed to qualify: Kertus Davis (#0), Drew White (#22)

- David Green qualified the #59 for Stacy Compton.
- Carl Edwards made his Series debut in this race, driving the #9 Chevy for Bost Motorsports. Edwards exited on lap 35 with valve issues and wound up 38th in the field of 43.

=== NetZero 250 ===
The NetZero 250 was held July 27 at Pikes Peak International Raceway. Jason Keller won the pole.

Top ten results

1. #36 - Hank Parker Jr.
2. #60 - Greg Biffle
3. #57 - Jason Keller
4. #26 - Ron Hornaday Jr.
5. #54 - Kevin Lepage
6. #23 - Scott Wimmer
7. #18 - Mike McLaughlin
8. #27 - Jamie McMurray
9. #46 - Ashton Lewis
10. #59 - Stacy Compton

Failed to qualify: none

- This was the first Busch Series victory for Dodge.

=== Kroger 200 ===
The Kroger 200 was held August 3 at Indianapolis Raceway Park. Greg Biffle won the pole.

Top ten results

1. #60 - Greg Biffle
2. #57 - Jason Keller
3. #23 - Scott Wimmer
4. #2 - Johnny Sauter
5. #22 - Kenny Wallace
6. #9 - Jon Wood
7. #5 - Ricky Hendrick
8. #27 - Jamie McMurray
9. #33 - Tony Raines
10. #26 - Ron Hornaday Jr.

Failed to qualify: none

=== Cabela's 250 ===
The Cabela's 250 was held August 17 at Michigan International Speedway. Kevin Lepage won the pole.

Top ten results

1. #99 - Michael Waltrip
2. #9 - Jeff Burton
3. #21 - Jeff Green
4. #92 - Todd Bodine
5. #25 - Bobby Hamilton Jr.
6. #10 - Scott Riggs
7. #23 - Scott Wimmer
8. #59 - Stacy Compton
9. #1 - Jimmy Spencer
10. #98 - Kasey Kahne

Failed to qualify: Richard Mitchell (#56), Michael Vergers (#07), Rick Markle (#84), Steadman Marlin (#95), Keith Murt (#79), Mike Harmon (#44), Brian Ross (#62), Jason Schuler (#73), Wayman Wittman (#93)

=== Food City 250 ===
The Food City 250 was held August 23 at Bristol Motor Speedway. Jason Keller won the pole. This race was marred by a violent practice crash involving Mike Harmon, in which Harmon's car hit the turn 2 entry gate and slammed into the end of the concrete wall, nearly ripping the car completely in half. As the wreckage slid town the track, the car was slammed into by Johnny Sauter. Harmon miraculously walked away from the crash unharmed, and managed to secure a backup car from Larry Gunselman.

Top ten results

1. #1 - Jimmy Spencer
2. #23 - Scott Wimmer
3. #60 - Greg Biffle
4. #18 - Mike McLaughlin
5. #21 - Jeff Green
6. #48 - Kenny Wallace
7. #99 - Michael Waltrip
8. #33 - Tony Raines
9. #57 - Jason Keller
10. #7 - Randy LaJoie

Failed to qualify: Ron Young (#71), Josh Richeson (#11), Kasey Kahne (#98), Tim Bainey Jr. (#15), Joe Buford (#84), Butch Jarvis (#53)

- Sammy Potashnick qualified the #49 but he was replaced in the race by Derrike Cope.

=== Gatorade 200 ===
The Gatorade 200 was held August 31 at Darlington Raceway. Greg Biffle won the pole. The race was shortened to 74 laps due to rain.

Top ten results

1. #9 - Jeff Burton
2. #57 - Jason Keller
3. #21 - Jeff Green
4. #60 - Greg Biffle
5. #24 - Jack Sprague
6. #25 - Bobby Hamilton Jr.
7. #23 - Scott Wimmer
8. #18 - Mike McLaughlin
9. #33 - Tony Raines
10. #10 - Scott Riggs

Failed to qualify: Gus Wasson (#96), Ron Young (#71)

=== Funai 250 ===
The Funai 250 was held September 6 at Richmond International Raceway. Dale Earnhardt Jr. won the pole. This race was marred by several large accidents, the hardest involved Derrike Cope, whose car suffered a stuck throttle, and slammed the turn 1 wall with such force that the A pillar snapped and the roof was partially ripped off. Cope suffered minor injuries.

Top ten results

1. #8 - Dale Earnhardt Jr.
2. #27 - Jamie McMurray
3. #9 - Jeff Burton
4. #33 - Tony Raines
5. #57 - Jason Keller
6. #60 - Greg Biffle
7. #36 - Hank Parker Jr.
8. #99 - Michael Waltrip
9. #23 - Scott Wimmer
10. #48 - Kenny Wallace

Failed to qualify: Michael Vergers (#07), Brian Vickers (#40), Martin Truex Jr. (#58), Shayne Lockhart (#22), Dion Ciccarelli (#84), Chris Fontaine (#41), Ron Young (#71), Josh Richeson (#11), Mike Harmon (#44), Dan Pardus (#32), Butch Miller (#75)

=== MBNA All-American Heroes 200 ===
The MBNA All-American Heroes 200 was held September 21 at Dover International Speedway. Kevin Lepage won the pole.

Top ten results

1. #23 - Scott Wimmer*
2. #18 - Mike McLaughlin
3. #24 - Jack Sprague
4. #21 - Jeff Green
5. #57 - Jason Keller
6. #1 - Jimmy Spencer
7. #7 - Randy LaJoie
8. #19 - Tim Sauter
9. #48 - Kenny Wallace
10. #47 - Shane Hmiel

Failed to qualify: Chris Fontaine (#41), Bill Hoff (#93), Richard Mitchell (#56), Donnie Neuenberger (#52)

- This was Wimmer's first career NASCAR Busch Series victory.

=== Mr. Goodcents 300 ===
The Mr. Goodcents 300 was held September 28 at Kansas Speedway. Michael Waltrip won the pole.

Top ten results

1. #9 - Jeff Burton
2. #12 - Kerry Earnhardt
3. #87 - Joe Nemechek
4. #60 - Greg Biffle
5. #33 - Tony Raines
6. #1 - Jimmy Spencer
7. #21 - Jeff Green
8. #25 - Bobby Hamilton Jr.
9. #15 - Lyndon Amick
10. #27 - Jamie McMurray

Failed to qualify: Mike Wallace (#4), Jason Schuler (#73), Steadman Marlin (#95), Ryck Sanders (#52)

- Kevin Grubb qualified the #54 but he was replaced in the race by Tim Fedewa.
- This race marked the final career start for Ricky Hendrick, as he would retire from driving after this race, citing health reasons. David Green would drive the #5 for the rest of the season.

=== Little Trees 300 ===
The Little Trees 300 was held October 12 at Lowe's Motor Speedway. Michael Waltrip won the pole. The top three finishers were the only cars to finish on the lead lap.

Top ten results

1. #9 - Jeff Burton
2. #99 - Michael Waltrip
3. #87 - Joe Nemechek
4. #21 - Jeff Green
5. #5 - David Green
6. #60 - Greg Biffle
7. #6 - Wally Dallenbach Jr.
8. #18 - Mike McLaughlin
9. #25 - Bobby Hamilton Jr.
10. #47 - Shane Hmiel

Failed to qualify: Justin Labonte (#04), Brad Baker (#28), Jeff Fultz (#86), Jason White (#95), Carl Long (#22), Chad Chaffin (#16), John Hayden (#85), Larry Gunselman (#94), Brian Weber (#84), Cam Strader (#52), Mike Harmon (#44)

=== Sam's Town 250 Benefitting St. Jude ===
The Sam's Town 250 Benefitting St. Jude was held October 20 at Memphis Motorsports Park. Greg Biffle won the pole. The race was scheduled for October 19, but was postponed a day for rain, and was broadcast on tape delay due to a conflict with the Old Dominion 500.

Top ten results

1. #23 - Scott Wimmer
2. #59 - Stacy Compton
3. #27 - Jamie McMurray
4. #36 - Hank Parker Jr.
5. #12 - Kerry Earnhardt
6. #19 - Tim Sauter
7. #26 - Ron Hornaday Jr.
8. #21 - Jay Sauter
9. #5 - David Green
10. #57 - Jason Keller

Failed to qualify: Jason Schuler (#73), Bryan Reffner (#70), John Hayden (#85), Tim Bainey Jr. (#15), Mike Harmon (#44), Chris Fontaine (#41), Jody Lavender (#84), Chad Chaffin (#16), Michael Dokken (#55), Dan Pardus (#32), Justin Ashburn (#61), Butch Jarvis (#53)

- Christian Fittipaldi qualified the #30 but he was replaced in the race by Chad Chaffin, who DNQed his #16.

=== Aaron's 312 ===
The Aaron's 312 was held October 26 at Atlanta Motor Speedway. Greg Biffle won the pole.

Top ten results

1. #27 - Jamie McMurray*
2. #99 - Michael Waltrip
3. #18 - Mike McLaughlin
4. #10 - Scott Riggs
5. #60 - Greg Biffle
6. #87 - Joe Nemechek
7. #57 - Jason Keller
8. #25 - Bobby Hamilton Jr.
9. #46 - Ashton Lewis
10. #2 - Johnny Sauter

Failed to qualify: David Reutimann (#88), Roberto Guerrero (#09), Lyndon Amick (#15), Hermie Sadler (#43), Justin Labonte (#04), Keith Murt (#79)

- This was McMurray's first career Busch Series victory, coming just two weeks after scoring his first Cup Series victory at Charlotte.

=== Sam's Club 200 ===
The Sam's Club 200 was held November 2 at North Carolina Speedway. Jeff Green won the pole.

Top ten results

1. #27 - Jamie McMurray
2. #60 - Greg Biffle*
3. #7 - Randy LaJoie
4. #5 - David Green
5. #59 - Stacy Compton
6. #21 - Jeff Green*
7. #99 - Michael Waltrip*
8. #47 - Shane Hmiel
9. #48 - Kenny Wallace
10. #24 - Jack Sprague

Failed to qualify: Justin Labonte (#04), Cam Strader (#52), Jeff Fultz (#86), Dan Pardus (#32), C. W. Smith (#67), Jody Lavender (#08), Clay Dale (#09), Brad Baker (#28)-Withdrew

- Michael Waltrip and Jeff Green were battling for the lead with two laps remaining. In turn three, Waltrip's car got loose and made contact with Green, spinning both cars out, and effectively handing the race victory to McMurray.
- Biffle's 2nd-place finish extended his points lead to 212 points over Jason Keller, who finished three laps down in 27th.

=== Bashas' Supermarkets 200 ===
The Bashas' Supermarkets 200 was held November 9 at Phoenix International Raceway. Greg Biffle won the pole. By finishing third in this race, Biffle would mathematically win the 2002 Busch Series championship.

Top ten results

1. #23 - Scott Wimmer
2. #59 - Stacy Compton
3. #60 - Greg Biffle*
4. #57 - Jason Keller
5. #5 - David Green
6. #1 - Jimmy Spencer
7. #2 - Johnny Sauter
8. #46 - Ashton Lewis
9. #6 - Wally Dallenbach Jr.
10. #12 - Kerry Earnhardt

Failed to qualify: Jimmy Kitchens (#72), Jay Sauter (#02)

- Biffle would lock up the championship by 227 points ahead of Keller. Entering this race, Biffle needed to finish 4th or better to win the championship.

=== Ford 300 ===
The Ford 300 was held November 16 at Homestead-Miami Speedway. Jeff Green won the pole.

Top ten results

1. #23 - Scott Wimmer
2. #36 - Hank Parker Jr.
3. #87 - Joe Nemechek
4. #60 - Greg Biffle
5. #25 - Bobby Hamilton Jr.
6. #7 - Randy LaJoie
7. #99 - Michael Waltrip
8. #1 - Jimmy Spencer
9. #46 - Ashton Lewis
10. #21 - Jeff Green

Failed to qualify: Geoff Bodine (#51), Kertus Davis (#0), Stanton Barrett (#91), Bryan Reffner (#07), Mike Wallace (#4), Carlos Contreras (#09), Cam Strader (#52), Mike Harmon (#44), Larry Gunselman (#94), Jimmy Kitchens (#84), Dwayne Leik (#81), Norm Benning (#8)

== Full Drivers' Championship ==
(key) Bold – Pole position awarded by time. Italics – Pole position set by owner's points. * – Most laps led. ** - All laps led.

Pos	Driver	DAY	CAR	LVS	DAR	BRI	TEX	NSH	TAL	CAL	RCH	NHA	NAZ	CLT	DOV	NSH	KEN	MIL	DAY	CHI	GTY	PPR	IRP	MCH	BRI	DAR	RCH	DOV	KAN	CLT	MEM	ATL	CAR	PHO	HOM	Pts
1	Greg Biffle	22	2	9	2	5	17	33	26	10*	3	31	27	2*	1*	**3**	2	**1***	2	8	1	2	1	42	3	4*	6	17	4	6	**34***	5	2	**3***	4	4924
2	Jason Keller	4	1	22	4	29	13	5*	1*	5	1*	32	1*	13	28	5	34	2	4	10	6	**3**	2	35	**9**	2	5	5	30	18	10	7	27	4	15*	4644
3	Scott Wimmer	13	19	13	34	3	21	4	28	12	8	11	16	18	4	7	5	3	26	13	21	6	3	7	2	7	9	1	24	43	1*	13	17	1	1	4488
4	Mike McLaughlin	38	5	12	6	2	18	20	24	6	14	5	9	4	8	33	39	8	7	27	7	7	14	17	4	8	19	2	31	8	16	3	13	19	20	4253
5	Jack Sprague	7	6	6	9	19	2*	2	13	4	18	3	26	10	5	1*	16	14	28	42	4	14	17	15	28	5	33	3	20	25	18	42	10	22	11	4206
6	Jamie McMurray	11	15	29	16	26	19	7	27	11	9	9	4	16	32	26	6	16	5	12	8	8	8	12	11	32	2	26	10	41	3	1	1	38	14	4147
7	Kenny Wallace	10	12	8	5	6	25	11	9	14	17	26	12	12	7	6	9	18	35	28	19	13	5	18	6	11	10	9	22	22	19	18	9	30	24	4078
8	Bobby Hamilton Jr.	30	16	11	12	13	8	3	22	37	25*	1*	6	7	3	2	36	7	33	9	17	12	31	5	32	6	14	30	8	9	37	8	29	24	5	4058
9	Stacy Compton	20	22	10	10	36	11	9	2	3	12	27	13	17	21	13	17	33	10	32	31	10	16	8	34	21	18	15	12	16	2	11	5	2	13	4042
10	Scott Riggs **(R)**	6	4	34	20	**9**	4	1	19	1	27	7	2	3	11	20	**4***	37	15	30	27	16	11*	6	18	10	34	14	23*	39	36	4	18	40	17	4023
11	Randy LaJoie	12	3	7	27	7	7	6	17	9	13	6	5	32	9	36	13	10	36	17	**18**	20	13	24	10	20	20	7	17	38	35	15	3	16	6	4021
12	Tony Raines	34	9	36	7	11	20	30	20	25	37	24	10	21	27	22	3	5	13	18	5	35	9	16	8	9	4	11	5	11	15	19	23	28	36	3804
13	Tim Sauter	26	29	17	22	16	22	10	32	7	10	12	14	19	22	32	15	9	12	34	10	23	33	20	17	19	25	8	11	13	6	32	14	36	18	3644
14	Hank Parker Jr.	35	20	26	13	33	14	34	10	13	6	8	24	15	24	8	41	20	18	40	16	1	38	13	15	15	7	38	18	40	4	43	11	27	2	3540
15	Johnny Sauter **(R)**	17	13	3	11	35	15	12	**33**	39	22	21	11	QL	40	19	24	12	6	1	11	34	4	22	33	25	36	16	15	37	14	10	20	7	19	3538
16	Shane Hmiel **(R)**	5	36	42	19	10	26	**19**	21	23	21	**4**	19	31	33	9	19	6	34	23	26	24	39	25	24	29	28	10	14	10	11	20	8	41	16	3416
17	Ashton Lewis	33	8	15	25	18	39	37	23	16	2	20	8	20	19	37	11	38	19	11	40	9	37	38	39	23	35	12	19	33	32	9	25	8	9	3279
18	Ron Hornaday Jr.				15	38	12	22	29	17		14	3	**33**	6	31	37	4	21	5	2*	4	10	37	12	38	26	21	34	14	7	16	26	12	26	3268
19	Jeff Green	25	**11***	5	3	1*	**5**			2	39			1	**2**					7				3	5	3	12	4*	7	4		17	**6***	31	**10**	3209
20	Larry Foyt	15	10	27	38	20	16	25	8	31	20	19	31	27	14	17	38	23	11	22	23	28	22	26	21	26	40	28	28	17	21	27	24	25	28	3158
21	Casey Mears **(R)**	23	23	18	39	23	38	23	5	29	23	17	15	23	36	10	20	19	16	38	15	25	25	34	40	12	30	22	29	27	23	23	34	15	12	3148
22	Kerry Earnhardt **(R)**	41	28	19	18	28	23	8	18	21	33	18	20	28	16	18	7	27	38	43	12	18	35	21	31	28	27	39	2	31	5	41	31	10	27	3145
23	Todd Bodine				8	8	30	18	4	22	40	2	23	5	12	11	1	26	27	**2**	32	37	12	4	16	17	13	43	32				12	34	39	3071
24	Kevin Grubb			41	32	12	24	16	11	19	5	10	32	8	10	39	35	30	9	16	3	11	30	31	20	14	43	35	QL		29	25	39	13	38	2885
25	Kevin Lepage	8		4	21	34			Wth					6	18	14	12	11	3	15	9	5*	32	**36**	13	13	11	**24**	13	19	43	40			37	2594
26	Jimmy Spencer	28	7	16	24	4	28		37	35	32			38	37				8	6				9	1*	22	32	6	6	34		38		6	8	2454
27	Michael Waltrip	2	26	2	14	30	42		35	8	4			11					42					1*	7		8		**33**	**2**		2*	7		7	2397
28	Ricky Hendrick	27	21	37							15	15	30	22	25	15	8	15	20	21	24	22	7	23	29	33	17	27	38							2125
29	Shane Hall	32			DNQ		40	14	31	27	36	16	29	24	29	30	10	35	31	29	33	15	20	41	26	16	29							23	33	1971
30	Brian Vickers **(R)**		25	20	37	14					7			26			32	28		31		21	19		38	37	DNQ	13	39	28	13	12	21	11	34	1914
31	Jeff Burton			**1***	**1****		10			15		41		30						3*				2		1	3		1*	1*				17		1907
32	Mark Green				17	17					28		33	35	15	12	QL	22		41	22	19			37		16	20	16	30	38	28	19	14	30	1896
33	Kasey Kahne **(R)**		31			32	36			18	30			29	20				25	25			15	10	DNQ	18	15	19	27	32		21	16	18	21	1887
34	Joe Nemechek	**43**		14			3		34	41					13		25		**1***	4				11					3	3		6			3	1773
35	Chad Chaffin	40	32	40	36	40	34	39	12	34						27	DNQ	25	39	26	34	29	23	39	19	40	39	42	42	DNQ	42	33	30	29		1643
36	Jay Sauter							15	30			30	7	9		4	21	13	37		13	17	36								8			DNQ	25	1525
37	Mike Wallace	DNQ		25			27		38	36				39			31		14	14	20		18	19	42		24	18	DNQ	15		21		24	DNQ	1506
38	Mike Harmon	DNQ	42	DNQ	35	42	DNQ	41	39	28	29	34	37		35	40	40	34	22	33	42	32	41	DNQ	43	34	DNQ	40	41	DNQ	DNQ	39	36	39	DNQ	1321
39	Jeff Purvis	21	18	23	30	27	1	13	15	24	11	13	28																							1309
40	David Green	18										33		14	38	QL	42			19	QL									5	9	14	4	5	42	1257
41	Larry Gunselman								16				41	DNQ			33		23	37	25	31	26	28	35	35		34	36	DNQ	33	31	43	42	DNQ	1094
42	Brad Teague		41		42	43	35	24	42		42	40	38		26	28	28		43		29	42	24		25	42								43		1066
43	Jimmy Kitchens							42	7			22	34	40		42		24	17	36			27	32		30	41	41						DNQ	DNQ	981
44	Lyndon Amick	19	14	30	41	22	41	28	25	20	31																		9			DNQ				960
45	Ron Young										DNQ		17			38		21			14		28		DNQ	DNQ	DNQ	32	40	24	25	29	37		32	945
46	Stanton Barrett													DNQ		21	43			20	28	27		33		24		23		21	22	34	42		DNQ	908
47	Butch Miller				33	15		21			19					16	18		32				34		22		DNQ				31					907
48	Andy Kirby	37	38	28	31	39	QL	29	6	32	38				39	41	23																			818
49	Dan Pardus **(R)**	DNQ	34	33	23		DNQ	32			34			25		35	27		41	DNQ				27		39	DNQ			42	DNQ		DNQ			780
50	Brian Weber					25		31			DNQ	36	25		41	43	DNQ	40		39	39	33	29			36				DNQ			40			714
51	Tim Fedewa								3				39												14		31	36	25	12	20	26				654
52	Joe Buford				43	37										29									DNQ			31	35	36	41	30	35	26	40	649
53	Stuart Kirby						43			33				41		25	29	17			36	26														554
54	Derrike Cope			31	28	21	32	38																	36	27	38									551
55	Steadman Marlin	24					29	27								24	22			DNQ		30		DNQ					DNQ							515
56	Steve Grissom																							30	41		22	29	37	23					31	502
57	Josh Richeson		30								41			43							41	38			DNQ		DNQ	33		35		35	28			495
58	Christian Elder	36	37	38			31		43	43							26		29	QL																455
59	Brad Baker					41		17								23	DNQ								23					DNQ	17		Wth			452
60	Dale Earnhardt Jr.	1*												36													**1***									425
61	Coy Gibbs								41								14								27				21		30					416
62	Wally Dallenbach Jr.																							14						7				9		405
63	David Reutimann										16						QL														12	DNQ	15		43	399
64	Kevin Harvick					24	6																		30									37		376
65	Martin Truex Jr.											29			17												DNQ	25							23	370
66	Hermie Sadler																30						40				21			29		DNQ	33		29	368
67	Kertus Davis										26							32			DNQ					31					24		41		DNQ	353
68	Andy Houston	9	17	24																																346
69	Chad Little	14	24	21																																312
70	Elton Sawyer																																22	20	22	297
71	Troy Cline										24	23	21																							285
72	Richard Mitchell							35								34				DNQ				DNQ			23	DNQ					32			280
73	Phil Bonifield				DNQ					30		35		DNQ	43			42					43			43										270
74	Ken Alexander		33	35	29	31																														268
75	Jason White							43				28	22	37																DNQ						262
76	Bruce Bechtel									26												40										36		32		250
77	Matt Kenseth	3	39	43			9																													245
78	Jason Schuler						DNQ	36								DNQ	DNQ	39		DNQ	37	36	42	DNQ					DNQ		DNQ					245
79	Dwayne Leik				40		DNQ										DNQ			24				40								37			DNQ	229
80	Lowell Bennett																	41					21								26					225
81	Bill Hoff		43										35		42			36								41		DNQ								224
82	Dion Ciccarelli			DNQ				40			35				31		DNQ										DNQ	37								223
83	Jeff Fultz	29						26						42		DNQ	DNQ													DNQ			DNQ			198
84	Kelly Denton	16	27	QL																																197
85	Joe Bessey											25	18																							197
86	C. W. Smith	DNQ							14										30														DNQ			194
87	Dana White																														27		38		41	171
88	Jon Wood																						6													150
89	Nick Woodward														30	DNQ		31																		143
90	Daniel Johnson		40										40														37									138
91	Jeff Spraker	39										39							24																	137
92	Damon Lusk																										42					22				134
93	Eric Jones																				43								26							119
94	Robbie Faggart		35											34																						119
95	Richard Jarvis Jr.														34																40					104
96	Andy Santerre											38	36																							104
97	Jerry Nadeau																													20						103
98	Ken Schrader			39			37																													98
99	Rick Markle								DNQ	38			42									39		DNQ												95
100	Lance Hooper		DNQ												23																					94
101	Dan Shaver																			35				43												92
102	Christian Fittipaldi										DNQ			DNQ							35								43		QL					92
103	Mike Laughlin Jr.			DNQ	26																															85
104	Donnie Neuenberger																											DNQ		26						85
105	Jeff Fuller	42		DNQ					40																											80
106	Clay Dale																														28		DNQ			79
107	Jim Sauter																	29																		76
108	Bryan Reffner																							29							DNQ				DNQ	76
109	Sammy Potashnick		QL																		30				QL											73
110	Kirk Shelmerdine	31																																		70
111	Craig Raudman			32																																67
112	David Starr						33																													64
113	John Hayden																													DNQ	DNQ			33		64
114	Dave Blaney																																		35	63
115	P. J. Jones																																	35		58
116	Mike Johnson											37	QL																							52
117	Carl Edwards																				38															49
118	Regan Smith																														39					46
119	Scott Gaylord									40																										43
120	Robby Benton																		40																	43
121	Brent Glastetter																					41														40
122	Austin Cameron									42																										37
123	Johnny Benson										43																									34
124	Brad Mueller																	43																		34
125	Brent Moore																					43														34
126	Joe Ruttman								36																											
127	Gus Wasson												43													DNQ										
128	David Ray Boggs	DNQ																																		
129	Cam Strader		DNQ																											DNQ			DNQ		DNQ	
130	A. J. Alsup			DNQ																																
131	Jack Sellers									DNQ																										
132	Toby Robertson										DNQ																									
133	Billy Morris III										DNQ																									
134	Carl Long													DNQ																DNQ						
135	Kevin Prince															DNQ																				
136	Brian Ross																	DNQ						DNQ												
137	Larry Hollenbeck																			DNQ																
138	Drew White																				DNQ															
139	Wayman Wittman																							DNQ												
140	Michael Vergers																							DNQ			DNQ									
141	Keith Murt																							DNQ								DNQ				
142	Butch Jarvis																								DNQ						DNQ					
143	Tim Bainey Jr.																								DNQ						DNQ					
144	Shayne Lockhart																										DNQ									
145	Chris Fontaine																										DNQ	DNQ			DNQ					
146	Ryck Sanders																												DNQ							
147	Justin Labonte																													DNQ		DNQ	DNQ			
148	Michael Dokken																														DNQ					
149	Justin Ashburn																														DNQ					
150	Jody Lavender																														DNQ		DNQ			
151	Roberto Guerrero																															DNQ				
152	Geoff Bodine																																		DNQ	
153	Carlos Contreras																																		DNQ	
154	Norm Benning																																		DNQ	
155	Mike Chase							QL																												
Pos	Driver	DAY	CAR	LVS	DAR	BRI	TEX	NSH	TAL	CAL	RCH	NHA	NAZ	CLT	DOV	NSH	KEN	MIL	DAY	CHI	GTY	PPR	IRP	MCH	BRI	DAR	RCH	DOV	KAN	CLT	MEM	ATL	CAR	PHO	HOM	Pts

== NASCAR Rookie of the Year ==
Scott Riggs of ppc Racing took home the 2002 Rookie of the Year title, winning twice and finishing tenth in points. Johnny Sauter won at Chicagoland Speedway and finished 14th in points despite skipping the Carquest Auto Parts 300. Shane Hmiel and Casey Mears finished 16th and 21st respectively in their NASCAR debuts, while Kerry Earnhardt had two top-fives in his second bid for top rookie honors. Brian Vickers, Kasey Kahne, and Dan Pardus ran limited schedules during their rookie campaigns.

== See also ==
- 2002 NASCAR Winston Cup Series
- 2002 NASCAR Craftsman Truck Series
- 2002 ARCA Re/Max Series
- 2002 NASCAR Goody's Dash Series
