= 2002 Aaron's 312 at Talladega =

Stock car race at Talladega Superspeedway

Race details
- Race 8 of 34 of the 2002 NASCAR Busch Series season
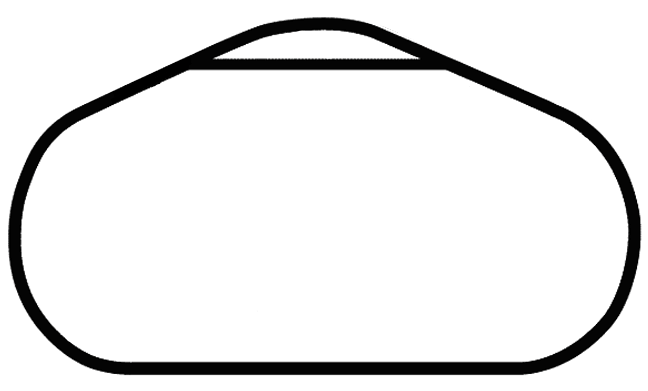
- Map of the Talladega Superspeedway
- Date: April 20, 2002
- Official name: Aaron's 312 at Talladega
- Location: Talladega Superspeedway in Lincoln, Alabama
- Course: Permanent racing facility
- Course length: 2.660 miles (4.280 km)
- Distance: 117 laps, 311.2 mi (500.83 km)
- Average speed: 157.691 mph (253.779 km/h)

Pole position
| Driver | Johnny Sauter | Richard Childress Racing |
- Time: 50.730

Most laps led
| Driver | Jason Keller | ppc Racing |
- Laps: 51

Winner
| No. 57 | Jason Keller | ppc Racing |

Television in the United States
- Network: Fox
- Announcers: Mike Joy, Darrell Waltrip, Larry McReynolds

The 2002 Aaron's 312 at Talladega was a NASCAR Busch Series stock car race held on April 20, 2002, at Talladega Superspeedway in Lincoln, Alabama. Johnny Sauter of Richard Childress Racing won the pole position, while Jason Keller of ppc Racing won the race. The race, however, was infamous for involving the largest accident in modern NASCAR history, which eliminated nearly three-quarters of the field early in the race.

== Report ==
=== Background ===
Because of a perceived aerodynamic advantage, several Chevrolet teams opted to run Pontiacs for the race.

=== Qualifying ===
Johnny Sauter qualified on pole position. Rick Markle was the only driver to not qualify.

=== Race ===
Sauter led the first eleven laps of the race, losing the lead on lap 12 to Stacy Compton. On lap 14, the largest crash in modern NASCAR history (1972–present) took place at the exit of turn two, with 31 cars being involved. Three cars (Stacy Compton, Jason Keller and Kenny Wallace) had cleared pole-sitter Johnny Sauter as the field started down the back-straightaway. Scott Riggs (fourth on the outside) tried to pass Wallace on the outside, but checked up, causing Shane Hmiel to get in the back of him. Subsequently, Kevin Grubb bumped Hmiel, causing both Riggs and Hmiel to turn sideways down the track and hit the right-rear of Sauter and the right-front of Joe Nemechek, respectively. The impact from Riggs' car caused Sauter's car to turn sideways and flip twice in the middle of the track, thus blocking the track and causing a massive pile-up behind. The drivers involved were Riggs, Hmiel, Sauter, Nemechek, Jack Sprague, Jeff Purvis, Jimmy Kitchens, Randy Lajoie, Kerry Earnhardt, Tony Raines, Bobby Hamilton Jr., Ashton Lewis, Mike McLaughlin, Lyndon Amick, Greg Biffle, Jamie McMurray, Scott Wimmer, Ron Hornaday Jr., Shane Hall, Tim Sauter, Jay Sauter, Michael Waltrip, Joe Ruttman, Jimmy Spencer, Mike Wallace, Mike Harmon, Jeff Fuller, and Coy Gibbs. During the wreck, the two Joe Gibbs Racing cars in Mike McLaughlin and Coy Gibbs ended with McLaughlin's car on top of Gibbs' car due to Gibbs not being able to see through the smoke and all the cars that were crashing and ended up driving into and under the rear of McLaughlin. At the time of the crash, 41 of the 43 cars were on the track. Of those, only Compton, Keller, Wallace (who were in front of the crash), C. W. Smith, Hank Parker Jr., Casey Mears, Andy Kirby, Tim Fedewa, Larry Gunselman, and Chad Chaffin (all of whom either got slowed down in time to miss the crash or had lost the lead draft altogether and were elsewhere on the track) made it through without damage. This crash brought out a 40-minute red flag and caused one minor injury to Mike Harmon (required stitches for biting through his tongue). After the 40-minute delay to clean up, the race resumed on lap 20 with only seven cars on the lead lap. The remainder of the race featured two additional caution periods for debris: one from laps 76–80, and another from laps 93–95.

Kenny Wallace led from laps 16 to 23, with Compton taking the lead on lap 24; Compton would lead until lap 40, when Keller held the lead for a lap. On lap 42, Compton regained first, leading for 25 laps, surrendering the lead to Jeff Purvis on lap 67. The next lap, Keller retook first, leading for the remainder of the race. Only three cars – Keller, Compton, and Tim Fedewa – finished on the lead lap. Kenny Wallace (engine), C.W. Smith (overheating), Purvis (engine), Lewis (crash), Biffle (engine), McMurray, Wimmer, Hornaday, Johnny Sauter, Hall, Tim Sauter, Nemechek, Waltrip, Ruttman, Spencer, Mike Wallace, Harmon, Fuller, Gibbs (crash), Brad Teague (overheating) and Christian Elder (engine) failed to finish. The race featured a total of six leaders and seven lead changes. Fedewa was a last-minute entry who planned to start and park after ten laps. As a late entry, Fedewa earned no driver points.

The win was Keller's first career victory at a superspeedway, his seventh-career Busch win, and his second of the season. ppc Racing owners Greg Pollex and Keith Barnwell recorded their 26th and third wins, respectively.

=== Race results ===
| Pos. | Grid | No. | Driver | Team | Manufacturer | Laps | Points |
|---|---|---|---|---|---|---|---|
| 1 | 12 | 57 | Jason Keller | ppc Racing | Ford | 117 | 185 |
| 2 | 2 | 59 | Stacy Compton | ST Motorsports | Chevrolet | 117 | 175 |
| 3 | 32 | 07 | Tim Fedewa | Biagi Brothers Racing | Pontiac | 117 | 0 |
| 4 | 17 | 92 | Todd Bodine | Herzog-Jackson Motorsports | Chevrolet | 116 | 160 |
| 5 | 24 | 66 | Casey Mears | Team Jesel | Dodge | 116 | 155 |
| 6 | 39 | 49 | Andy Kirby | Jay Robinson Racing | Ford | 115 | 150 |
| 7 | 36 | 77 | Jimmy Kitchens | Moy Racing | Ford | 111 | 146 |
| 8 | 31 | 14 | Larry Foyt | A. J. Foyt Racing | Chevrolet | 110 | 142 |
| 9 | 20 | 48 | Kenny Wallace | Innovative Motorsports | Pontiac | 107 | 143 |
| 10 | 9 | 36 | Hank Parker Jr. | Team Jesel | Dodge | 106 | 134 |
| 11 | 38 | 54 | Kevin Grubb | Team Bristol Motorsports | Chevrolet | 106 | 130 |
| 12 | 40 | 16 | Chad Chaffin | Day Enterprise Racing | Pontiac | 106 | 127 |
| 13 | 6 | 24 | Jack Sprague | Hendrick Motorsports | Chevrolet | 80 | 124 |
| 14 | 35 | 67 | C. W. Smith | Smith Brothers Motorsports | Chevrolet | 75 | 121 |
| 15 | 11 | 37 | Jeff Purvis | Brewco Motorsports | Pontiac | 73 | 123 |
| 16 | 42 | 84 | Larry Gunselman | Weber Racing | Chevrolet | 66 | 115 |
| 17 | 15 | 7 | Randy LaJoie | Evans Motorsports | Chevrolet | 63 | 112 |
| 18 | 23 | 12 | Kerry Earnhardt | FitzBradshaw Racing | Chevrolet | 63 | 109 |
| 19 | 5 | 10 | Scott Riggs | ppc Racing | Ford | 59 | 106 |
| 20 | 14 | 33 | Tony Raines | BACE Motorsports | Pontiac | 55 | 103 |
| 21 | 16 | 47 | Shane Hmiel | Innovative Motorsports | Pontiac | 54 | 100 |
| 22 | 37 | 25 | Bobby Hamilton Jr. | Team Rensi Motorsports | Ford | 53 | 97 |
| 23 | 30 | 46 | Ashton Lewis | Lewis Motorsports | Chevrolet | 52 | 94 |
| 24 | 19 | 18 | Mike McLaughlin | Joe Gibbs Racing | Chevrolet | 51 | 91 |
| 25 | 25 | 26 | Lyndon Amick | Carroll Racing | Pontiac | 50 | 88 |
| 26 | 7 | 60 | Greg Biffle | Roush Racing | Ford | 27 | 85 |
| 27 | 18 | 27 | Jamie McMurray | Brewco Motorsports | Pontiac | 25 | 82 |
| 28 | 34 | 23 | Scott Wimmer | Bill Davis Racing | Pontiac | 23 | 79 |
| 29 | 8 | 5 | Ron Hornaday Jr. | Hendrick Motorsports | Chevrolet | 23 | 76 |
| 30 | 4 | 21 | Jay Sauter | Richard Childress Racing | Chevrolet | 20 | 73 |
| 31 | 33 | 63 | Shane Hall | Ken Alexander Racing | Chevrolet | 18 | 70 |
| 32 | 10 | 19 | Tim Sauter | AP Performance Racing | Chevrolet | 18 | 67 |
| 33 | 1 | 2 | Johnny Sauter | Richard Childress Racing | Chevrolet | 14 | 69 |
| 34 | 3 | 87 | Joe Nemechek | NEMCO Motorsports | Pontiac | 14 | 61 |
| 35 | 13 | 99 | Michael Waltrip | Michael Waltrip Racing | Chevrolet | 14 | 58 |
| 36 | 21 | 51 | Joe Ruttman | Phoenix Racing | Pontiac | 14 | 55 |
| 37 | 28 | 1 | Jimmy Spencer | Phoenix Racing | Pontiac | 14 | 52 |
| 38 | 27 | 4 | Mike Wallace | Biagi Brothers Racing | Pontiac | 14 | 49 |
| 39 | 41 | 44 | Mike Harmon | Mixon Motorsports | Chevrolet | 14 | 46 |
| 40 | 22 | 88 | Jeff Fuller | NEMCO Motorsports | Pontiac | 14 | 43 |
| 41 | 26 | 20 | Coy Gibbs | Joe Gibbs Racing | Pontiac | 14 | 40 |
| 42 | 43 | 52 | Brad Teague | Jimmy Means Racing | Ford | 6 | 37 |
| 43 | 29 | 38 | Christian Elder | Akins Motorsports | Ford | 2 | 34 |
Failed to qualify, withdrew, or driver changes
| 44 | — | 96 | Rick Markle | Del Markle | Pontiac | — | — |
| WD | — | 71 | Kevin Lepage | — | Ford | — | — |

== Standings after the race ==
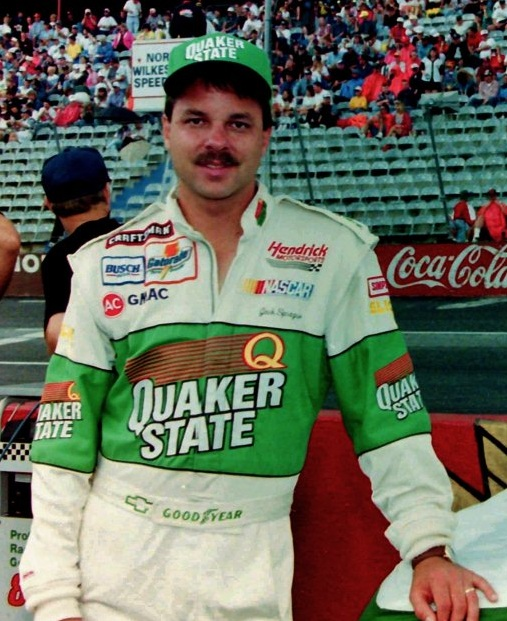
Jack Sprague (pictured in 1996) remained the points leader after the race.

| Pos | Driver | Points |
|---|---|---|
| 1 | Jack Sprague | 1169 |
| 2 | Jason Keller | 1147 |
| 3 | Randy LaJoie | 1079 |
| 4 | Kenny Wallace | 1069 |
| 5 | Scott Riggs | 1068 |
| 6 | Greg Biffle | 1001 |
| 7 | Bobby Hamilton Jr. | 983 |
| 8 | Stacy Compton | 971 |
| 9 | Mike McLaughlin | 964 |
| 10 | Scott Wimmer | 919 |
