= Jamie Mosley =

American racing driver (born 1969)

- Born: December 7, 1969 (age 56); London, Kentucky, U.S.

NASCAR O'Reilly Auto Parts Series career
- 13 races run over 6 years
- 2012 position: 87th
- Best finish: 65th (2003)
- First race: 2003 MBNA Armed Forces Family 200 (Nashville)
- Last race: 2012 Feed the Children 300 (Kentucky)
Wins	Top tens	Poles
0	0	0

NASCAR FedEx Freight Truck Series career
- 2 races run over 2 years
- 2018 position: 84th
- Best finish: 84th (2018)
- First race: 2009 Built Ford Tough 225 (Kentucky)
- Last race: 2018 37 Kind Days 250 (Kansas)
Wins	Top tens	Poles
0	0	0
- Statistics up to date as of October 12, 2018.

Jamie Mosley (born December 7, 1969) is an American professional stock car racing driver. He last competed part-time in the NASCAR Camping World Truck Series, driving the No. 50 Chevrolet Silverado for Beaver Motorsports and the No. 15 Silverado for Premium Motorsports.

== Racing career ==
=== Nationwide Series ===
Mosley made his debut in 2003 with Jay Robinson Racing in the Xfinity Series. In 2004, he left his team, Race Kentucky Motorsports, and became a free agent. He attempted one race each in 2004 (26th), 2005 (37th), 2006 (35th), 2007 (40th), and 2012 (29th).

=== Camping World Truck Series ===
Mosley ran one race in 2009 in the Truck Series at Kentucky. He started 28th and finished 29th due to clutch problems.

In 2018, Mosley returned to NASCAR after a six-year hiatus, driving the No. 50 Chevrolet Silverado for Beaver Motorsports at Kansas. He finished 28th after starting 26th.

=== ARCA Racing Series ===
Mosley ran three races each in the 2002 season and 2003 season. In the final standings, he finished 80th in 2002 and 95th in 2003.

== Personal life ==
In 2010, Mosley was elected as jailer of the Laurel County. In December 2012, he started a company selling e-cigarettes called Crossbar Electronic Cigarettes, which later sponsored him in his 2018 Kansas Truck race.

== Motorsports career results ==
=== NASCAR ===
(key) (Bold – Pole position awarded by qualifying time. Italics – Pole position earned by points standings or practice time. * – Most laps led.)

==== Nationwide Series ====
NASCAR Nationwide Series results
Year	Team	No.	Make	1	2	3	4	5	6	7	8	9	10	11	12	13	14	15	16	17	18	19	20	21	22	23	24	25	26	27	28	29	30	31	32	33	34	35	NNSC	Pts	Ref
2003	Jay Robinson Racing	39	Ford	DAY	CAR	LVS	DAR	BRI	TEX	TAL	NSH	CAL	RCH	GTY	NZH	CLT	DOV	NSH; 21	KEN; DNQ	MLW	DAY	CHI; 26	NHA	PPR; 26	IRP	MCH; 40	BRI; 36	DAR; 33	RCH; 39	DOV; 26	KAN; DNQ	CLT; DNQ	MEM	ATL	PHO	CAR	HOM		65th	563	
2004	MacDonald Motorsports	72	Chevy	DAY	CAR	LVS	DAR	BRI	TEX	NSH	TAL	CAL	GTY	RCH	NZH	CLT	DOV	NSH	KEN; 26	MLW	DAY	CHI	NHA	PPR	IRP	MCH	BRI	CAL	RCH	DOV	KAN	CLT	MEM	ATL	PHO	DAR	HOM		124th	85	
2005	Jay Robinson Racing	28	Ford	DAY	CAL	MXC	LVS	ATL	NSH	BRI	TEX	PHO	TAL	DAR	RCH	CLT	DOV	NSH	KEN; 37	MLW	DAY	CHI	NHA	PPR	GTY	IRP	GLN	MCH; DNQ	BRI	CAL	RCH	DOV	KAN; DNQ	CLT	MEM	TEX	PHO	HOM	134th	52	
2006	Jay Robinson Racing	49	Chevy	DAY	CAL	MXC	LVS	ATL	BRI	TEX	NSH	PHO	TAL	RCH	DAR	CLT	DOV	NSH	KEN; 35	MLW	DAY	CHI	NHA	MAR	GTY	IRP	GLN	MCH	BRI	CAL	RCH	DOV	KAN	CLT	MEM	TEX	PHO	HOM	133rd	58	
2007	Means Racing	52	Ford	DAY	CAL	MXC	LVS	ATL	BRI	NSH	TEX	PHO	TAL	RCH	DAR	CLT	DOV	NSH	KEN; 40	MLW	NHA	DAY	CHI	GTY	IRP	CGV	GLN	MCH	BRI	CAL	RCH	DOV	KAN	CLT	MEM	TEX	PHO	HOM	150th	43	
2012	SR² Motorsports	24	Chevy	DAY	PHO	LVS	BRI	CAL	TEX	RCH	TAL	DAR	IOW	CLT	DOV	MCH	ROA	KEN; 29	DAY	NHA	CHI	IND	IOW	GLN	CGV	BRI	ATL	RCH	CHI	KEN	DOV	CLT	KAN	TEX	PHO	HOM			87th	15	

==== Camping World Truck Series ====
NASCAR Camping World Truck Series results
Year	Team	No.	Make	1	2	3	4	5	6	7	8	9	10	11	12	13	14	15	16	17	18	19	20	21	22	23	24	25	NCWTC	Pts	Ref
2009	Tagsby Racing	65	Chevy	DAY	CAL	ATL	MAR	KAN	CLT	DOV	TEX	MCH	MLW	MEM	KEN; 29	IRP	NSH	BRI	CHI	IOW	GTW	NHA	LVS	MAR	TAL	TEX	PHO	HOM	100th	76	
2018	Beaver Motorsports	50	Chevy	DAY	ATL	LVS	MAR	DOV	KAN; 28	CLT	TEX	IOW	GTW	CHI	KEN	ELD	POC	MCH	BRI	MSP	LVS								84th	9	
2018	Premium Motorsports	15	Chevy																			TAL; DNQ	MAR	TEX	PHO	HOM			84th	9	

^{*} Season still in progress
^{1} Ineligible for series points

=== ARCA Re/Max Series ===
(key) (Bold – Pole position awarded by qualifying time. Italics – Pole position earned by points standings or practice time. * – Most laps led.)

ARCA Re/Max Series results
Year	Team	No.	Make	1	2	3	4	5	6	7	8	9	10	11	12	13	14	15	16	17	18	19	20	21	22	ARSC	Pts	Ref
2002	Mosley Racing	89	Chevy	DAY	ATL	NSH	SLM	KEN	CLT	KAN	POC	MCH	TOL	SBO	KEN; 18	BLN	POC	NSH	ISF	WIN	DSF	CHI; 24	SLM	TAL		80th	365	
2002	Mosley Racing	91	Chevy																						CLT; 23	80th	365	
2003	Norm Benning Racing	8	Chevy	DAY	ATL	NSH; 23	SLM	TOL																		95th	275	
2003	Norm Benning Racing	8	Pontiac						KEN; 28																	95th	275	
2003	Mark Gibson Racing	56	Pontiac							CLT; 32	BLN	KAN	MCH	LER	POC	POC	NSH	ISF	WIN	DSF	CHI	SLM	TAL	CLT	SBO	95th	275	
