= Joe Aramendia =

American racing driver

- Born: April 23, 1963 (age 63); New Braunfels, Texas, U.S.

NASCAR O'Reilly Auto Parts Series career
- 3 races run over 1 year
- Best finish: 82nd (2003)
- First race: 2003 Rockingham 200 (Rockingham)
- Last race: 2003 O'Reilly 300 (Texas)
Wins	Top tens	Poles
0	0	0

NASCAR FedEx Freight Truck Series career
- 7 races run over 2 years
- Best finish: 58th (2010)
- First race: 2010 North Carolina Education Lottery 200 (Charlotte)
- Last race: 2010 VFW 200 (Michigan)
Wins	Top tens	Poles
0	0	0
- Statistics up to date as of March 5, 2024.

Joe Aramendia (born April 23, 1963) is an American professional stock car racing driver who has previously competed in the NASCAR Xfinity Series and the NASCAR Craftsman Truck Series.

== Racing career ==
Aramendia began his racing career in 1988 at the age of 24, where he first competed in a thirty-lap feature race at the San Antonio Speedway in San Antonio, Texas that year, driving a 1977 Chevrolet Monte Carlo. For the next few years, he competed in various late model series, where he won several feature wins and finished in the top-ten in every season he contested. He then contested in various NASCAR sanctioned events, more specifically the NASCAR Southeast Series and the NASCAR Southwest Series, finishing sixth in the points in the Southeast Series in 2002 with seven top-ten finishes.

In 2003, Aramendia's brother, John, purchased several NASCAR Busch Series cars from A. J. Foyt Racing, and made select starts in the series. Aramendia made his debut at Rockingham Speedway, driving the No. 79 Chevrolet, where he qualified in 25th, and finished in the same position. He then ran the next race at Las Vegas Motor Speedway, this time starting 43rd after taking a provisional, and finished in 23rd. He then made one more start at Texas Motor Speedway, where he started 41st and finished in twentieth. He attempted two more races that year at Daytona International Speedway and Homestead-Miami Speedway, failing to qualify for both events.

In 2004, Aramendia ran three of the first four races of the NASCAR Craftsman Truck Series, driving the No. 31 Dodge for Brevak Racing. At Daytona International Speedway, he finished in 33rd due to a crash midway through the race. At Martinsville Speedway, he started in 29th and finished one lap down in 25th, and at Mansfield Motorsports Park, he started in 23rd but finish 28th due to a crash.

After not making another start in NASCAR for the next five years, Aramendia returned to the now NASCAR Camping World Truck Series at Texas, driving the No. 01 Chevrolet for Daisy Ramirez Motorsports, where he finished 24th due to a crash. He made three more starts that year, getting a best finish of 21st in his final start of the year at Nashville Superspeedway. This would be last start in NASCAR, as he has not competed in the series since then.

Arameindia has most recently competed in the South Texas Shootout Series in Corpus Christi, Texas.

== Personal life ==
Aramendia is the middle child of five children. His brother, John, is the owner of 1st Call Plumbing, Heating and Air, formerly Aramendia Plumbing, Heating and Air, a plumbing company based in San Antonio, Texas.

Aramendia is the uncle of fellow racing driver John Aramendia Jr., who competes part-time in the ARCA Menards Series.

== Motorsports career results ==
=== NASCAR ===
(key) (Bold – Pole position awarded by qualifying time. Italics – Pole position earned by points standings or practice time. * – Most laps led.)

==== Busch Series ====
NASCAR Busch Series results
Year	Team	No.	Make	1	2	3	4	5	6	7	8	9	10	11	12	13	14	15	16	17	18	19	20	21	22	23	24	25	26	27	28	29	30	31	32	33	34	NBSC	Pts	Ref
2003	Aramendia Motorsports	79	Chevy	DAY	CAR; 25	LVS; 23	DAR	BRI	TEX; 20	TAL	NSH	CAL	RCH	GTY	NZH	CLT	DOV	NSH	KEN	MLW																	HOM; DNQ	82nd	285	
2003	Aramendia Motorsports	79	Pontiac																		DAY; DNQ	CHI	NHA	PPR	IRP	MCH	BRI	DAR	RCH	DOV	KAN	CLT	MEM	ATL	PHO	CAR		82nd	285	

==== Camping World Truck Series ====
NASCAR Camping World Truck Series results
Year	Team	No.	Make	1	2	3	4	5	6	7	8	9	10	11	12	13	14	15	16	17	18	19	20	21	22	23	24	25	NCWTC	Pts	Ref
2004	Brevak Racing	31	Dodge	DAY; 33	ATL	MAR; 25	MFD; 28	CLT	DOV	TEX	MEM	MLW	KAN	KEN	GTW	MCH	IRP	NSH	BRI	RCH	NHA	LVS	CAL	TEX	MAR	PHO	DAR	HOM	60th	231	
2010	Daisy Ramirez Motorsports	01	Chevy	DAY	ATL	MAR	NSH	KAN	DOV	CLT	TEX; 24	MCH	IOW	GTY	IRP; 27	POC; 24	NSH; 21	DAR	BRI	CHI	KEN	NHA	LVS	MAR	TAL	TEX	PHO	HOM	58th	364	
