= Bost Motorsports =

Former NASCAR team

Bost Motorsports is a former NASCAR Busch Series team. It was owned by Danny Bost and driven by a variety of drivers.

Danny Bost decided to enter in decided to enter NASCAR in 2002, becoming co-owner of the Busch Series team called PF2 Motorsports (owned by Fred Bickford and his wife Pamela, hence the team's name: P for Pamela, F for Fred). With Bost joining the team, the team was renamed DF2 Motorsports (with Danny's D replacing the P) and this was the team's name in the 2002 season. The team used derivatives of the number 498 (in a tribute to the car that Fred Bickford used when he was a driver). At the end of the season, Bickford left the team (and later recreated the PF2 Motorsports). As a result, for the 2003 season, the team was renamed Bost Motorsports as Danny Bost became the sole owner of the team and its number became 22.

In 2002 the team ran Nos. 4, 9, 34 and 94. Running the No. 34, Daniel Johnson started 35th but finished 40th due to oil pressure problems. Carl Edwards also made his Busch Series debut for Bost at Gateway, driving the No. 9 Waterloo Tool Storage Chevy to a 38th-place run after suffering valve problems.

Jeff Fuller began 2003 with the team, qualifying 41st and finishing 24th. Rookie Regan Smith then signed a contract to finish out the year with Bost, posting three top-twenty finishes. He skipped the Aaron's 312 as he did not obtain a license from NASCAR, with Tina Gordon driving to a tenth-place run instead. After the Winn-Dixie 250, Smith resigned from the then unsponsored ride. His best finish to that date had been a 15th at Texas, the only top-15 for the team that did not come at a superspeedway. Justin Ashburn, Wayne Edwards, Brian Tyler, Jeff Streeter, Dana White, Phil Bonifield, Bill Hoff, Blake Mallory, and Jerry Reary shared the ride for the rest of the season. Of these replacement drivers, the best finish would be a 23rd ar IRP by Tyler in a one-off race. They would fail to qualify twice in their singular season, at Charlotte and Rockingham.

After Reary failed to qualify for the penultimate Target House 200, the team disappeared and then shut down. Bost has not re-appeared in any capacity in NASCAR since this event either, nor has he maintained any presence online for racing or otherwise.
