= Phil Bonifield =

American racing driver (born 1963)

- Born: Phillip Bonifield; June 23, 1963 (age 63) Napa, California, U.S.

Previous series
- 2007: NASCAR West Series

NASCAR O'Reilly Auto Parts Series career
- 8 races run over 3 years
- Best finish: 73rd (2002)
- First race: 2001 MBNA Platinum 200 (Dover)
- Last race: 2003 Winn-Dixie 200 (Darlington)
| Wins | Top tens | Poles |
|---|---|---|
| 0 | 0 | 0 |

NASCAR FedEx Freight Truck Series career
- 70 races run over 6 years
- Best finish: 20th (2003)
- First race: 1999 NAPACARD 200 (Evergreen)
- Last race: 2004 Line-X Spray-On Truck Bedliners 200 (Michigan)
| Wins | Top tens | Poles |
|---|---|---|
| 0 | 0 | 0 |
- Statistics up to date as of July 13, 2020.

Phillip Bonifield (born June 23, 1963) is an American former professional stock car racing driver and team owner. He was the owner/driver of Team Racing, which competed in the NASCAR Craftsman Truck Series with various drivers including himself driving their trucks. He also competed in the Busch Series part-time from 2001 to 2003 as well as in two West Series races in 2007.

== Racing career ==
Bonifield began his racing career in 1973, when he began competing with BMX bicycles. Racing across the United States, he won several championships from 1979 to 1983. In 1987, he moved to go-karts, where he raced against Kevin Harvick and Casey Mears, before competing part-time in the NASCAR Elite Division Featherlite Southwest Series in 1991.

Bonifield became a driving instructor at the Buck Baker Racing School in 1993, after he moved to the Southeast from California. Around the same time, he opened his own fabrication shop, and worked for various Winston Cup teams. In 1998, Bonifield closed his fabrication shop and began fielding entries in the Truck series. His first race as owner in a points-paying event came that season at Walt Disney World Speedway in the No. 11 Red Line Oil Chevrolet, driven by Brett Bodine, who qualified 13th but finished 32nd after an engine failure. Bodine ran two more races for Bonifield that season, both races resulting in DNFs.

In 1999, Bonefield decided to pull double duty as an owner and driver, with Tom Mazzucchi coming aboard as a partner in the No. 23 Red Line Oil truck. He made his Craftsman Truck Series debut at Evergreen Speedway, finishing 30th. Bonifield would compete 13 more times that year, and finished 31st in points, and seventh in Rookie of the Year standings. In 2000, he ran just eight races, and did not finish a single race.

In 2001, Bonifield posted a career-best 24th twice, at California and Las Vegas. That same season, he began running races part-time for Impact Motorsports, and purchased Impact's owner's points and equipment after it shut down, renaming his operation Team Racing. He also made his Busch debut at the MBNA Platinum 200 for Jay Robinson Racing, starting 34th but finishing 36th after engine problems plagued the team.

In 2002, mechanical problems continued to plague Bonifield and his team, as he failed to finish any of his eleven starts that season. Despite this, he finished 31st in points. He also ran six Busch races, two for his own team, one for Bost Motorsports, and the rest for Means Racing. His best finish was a 30th at Fontana, the only race he finished that year. 2003 marked Bonifield's best Truck Series season, as he ran 21 of 25 races, and finished 20th in points. His best finish was 23rd at Memphis Motorsports Park.

Unfortunately, his success was not carried over into 2004. Neither Bonifield nor his team ran many races that season. Bonifield only qualified for events, and was twice parked for driving too slow. During the season, Bonifield sold the trucks to Bill Davis Racing and shut down the team. He and spent 2005 and 2006 developing ARCA Re/Max Series and NASCAR Grand National Division, AutoZone West Series driver Andrew Myers. He returned to the Truck Series in 2006, fielding the No. 86 Chevrolet.

== Motorsports career results ==
=== NASCAR ===
(key) (Bold – Pole position awarded by qualifying time. Italics – Pole position earned by points standings or practice time. * – Most laps led.)

==== Busch Series ====
NASCAR Busch Series results
| Year | Team | No. | Make | 1 | 2 | 3 | 4 | 5 | 6 | 7 | 8 | 9 | 10 | 11 | 12 | 13 | 14 | 15 | 16 | 17 | 18 | 19 | 20 | 21 | 22 | 23 | 24 | 25 | 26 | 27 | 28 | 29 | 30 | 31 | 32 | 33 | 34 | NBSC | Pts | Ref |
|---|---|---|---|---|---|---|---|---|---|---|---|---|---|---|---|---|---|---|---|---|---|---|---|---|---|---|---|---|---|---|---|---|---|---|---|---|---|---|---|---|
| 2001 | Jay Robinson Racing | 49 | Ford | DAY | CAR | LVS | ATL | DAR | BRI | TEX | NSH | TAL | CAL | RCH | NHA | NZH | CLT | DOV; 36 | KEN | MLW | GLN | CHI | GTY | PPR | IRP | MCH | BRI | DAR | RCH | DOV | KAN | CLT | MEM | PHO | CAR | HOM | | 127th | 55 | |
| 2002 | Team Racing | 90 | Pontiac | DAY | CAR | LVS | DAR; DNQ | BRI | TEX | NSH | TAL | CAL; 30 | RCH | NHA; 35 | NZH | CLT; DNQ | | | | | | | | | | | | | | | | | | | | | | 73rd | 270 | |
| 2002 | Means Racing | 52 | Ford | | | | | | | | | | | | | | DOV; 43 | NSH | KEN | MLW; 42 | DAY | CHI | GTY | PPR | IRP; 43 | MCH | BRI | | | | | | | | | | | 73rd | 270 | |
| 2002 | Bost Motorsports | 4 | Chevy | | | | | | | | | | | | | | | | | | | | | | | | | DAR; 43 | RCH | DOV | KAN | CLT | MEM | ATL | CAR | PHO | HOM | 73rd | 270 | |
| 2003 | Bost Motorsports | 22 | Chevy | DAY | CAR | LVS | DAR | BRI | TEX | TAL | NSH | CAL | RCH | GTY | NZH | CLT | DOV | NSH | KEN | MLW | DAY | CHI | NHA | PPR | IRP | MCH | BRI | DAR; 40 | RCH | DOV | KAN | CLT | MEM | ATL | PHO | CAR | HOM | 150th | 43 | |

==== Craftsman Truck Series ====
NASCAR Craftsman Truck Series results
| Year | Team | No. | Make | 1 | 2 | 3 | 4 | 5 | 6 | 7 | 8 | 9 | 10 | 11 | 12 | 13 | 14 | 15 | 16 | 17 | 18 | 19 | 20 | 21 | 22 | 23 | 24 | 25 | NCTC | Pts | Ref |
|---|---|---|---|---|---|---|---|---|---|---|---|---|---|---|---|---|---|---|---|---|---|---|---|---|---|---|---|---|---|---|---|
| 1999 | Team 23 Racing | 23 | Chevy | HOM | PHO | EVG; 30 | MMR | MAR | MEM | PPR; 35 | I70; 32 | BRI; 32 | TEX; 32 | PIR | GLN | MLW; 33 | NSV; 34 | NZH; 33 | MCH; 30 | NHA; 32 | IRP; 32 | GTY; 31 | HPT; 34 | RCH; QL^{†} | LVS; 34 | LVL; DNQ | TEX | CAL | 31st | 972 | |
| 2000 | Team 23 Racing | 23 | Chevy | DAY; DNQ | HOM | PHO; 35 | MMR; 32 | MAR | PIR | GTY | MEM; DNQ | PPR; 35 | EVG; 31 | TEX | KEN; 33 | GLN; DNQ | MLW | NHA | NZH; 30 | MCH; 34 | IRP | NSV; DNQ | CIC; DNQ | RCH | DOV | TEX | CAL; 36 | | 39th | 617 | |
| 2001 | Team 23 Racing | 23 | Chevy | DAY | HOM | MMR | MAR | GTY; 35 | DAR | PPR; 33 | DOV; 34 | TEX; 31 | MEM | MLW; 31 | KAN; 31 | KEN; DNQ | NHA; 32 | IRP | | | | | | | | | CAL; DNQ | | 33rd | 932 | |
| 2001 | Team 23 Racing | 25 | Chevy | | | | | | | | | | | | | | | | NSH; 27 | CIC | NZH | RCH | SBO; 36 | TEX; 31 | | PHO; DNQ | | | 33rd | 932 | |
| 2001 | Team 23 Racing | 86 | Chevy | | | | | | | | | | | | | | | | | | | | | | LVS; 24 | | | | 33rd | 932 | |
| 2002 | Team Racing | 86 | Chevy | DAY; 35 | | | | | | TEX; 34 | | | | | | MCH; 33 | IRP | | | | | | | | | | | | 31st | 704 | |
| 2002 | Team Racing | 23 | Chevy | | DAR; DNQ | MAR | GTY; DNQ | PPR; 35 | DOV; DNQ | | MEM; 34 | MLW; 31 | KAN; 31 | KEN; 32 | NHA | | | NSH; DNQ | RCH | TEX; 33 | SBO | LVS | | PHO; 34 | | | | | 31st | 704 | |
| 2002 | Team Racing | 25 | Chevy | | | | | | | | | | | | | | | | | | | | CAL; 31 | | HOM; DNQ | | | | 31st | 704 | |
| 2003 | Team Racing | 23 | Chevy | DAY; 34 | | | | CLT; DNQ | DOV; 29 | | | MLW; 32 | KAN; 28 | KEN; 25 | GTW; 30 | MCH; 32 | IRP | NSH; 28 | BRI; 35 | | NHA; 32 | | | | TEX; 32 | MAR; 35 | PHO; 29 | | 20th | 1524 | |
| 2003 | Team Racing | 86 | Chevy | | DAR; 29 | MMR | MAR | | | TEX; 28 | MEM; 23 | | | | | | | | | RCH; 35 | | CAL; 31 | LVS; 31 | SBO; 30 | | | | HOM; 25 | 20th | 1524 | |
| 2004 | Team Racing | 25 | Chevy | DAY; DNQ | ATL | MAR | MFD | CLT | DOV; 34 | TEX; 33 | MEM | MLW | KAN; 33 | KEN | GTW | MCH; 33 | IRP | NSH | BRI | RCH | NHA | LVS | CAL | TEX | MAR | PHO | DAR | HOM | 107th | 64 | |
^{†} – Qualified but replaced by Boris Said

==== West Series ====
NASCAR West Series results
| Year | Team | No. | Make | 1 | 2 | 3 | 4 | 5 | 6 | 7 | 8 | 9 | 10 | 11 | 12 | 13 | NWSC | Pts | Ref |
|---|---|---|---|---|---|---|---|---|---|---|---|---|---|---|---|---|---|---|---|
| 2007 | Pam Lippard | 30 | Chevy | CTS | PHO; 38 | | | | | | | | | | | | 50th | 140 | |
| 2007 | Pam Lippard | 30 | Ford | | | AMP; 24 | ELK | IOW | CNS | SON | DCS | IRW | MMP | EVG | CSR | AMP | 50th | 140 | |
