= Jerry Reary =

American racing driver

- Born: December 4, 1961 (age 64); Matthews, North Carolina, U.S.

NASCAR O'Reilly Auto Parts Series career
- 3 races run over 1 year
- Best finish: 95th (2003)
- First race: 2003 Kroger 200 (IRP)
- Last race: 2003 Bashas' Supermarkets 200 (Phoenix)
Wins	Top tens	Poles
0	0	0

Jerry Reary (born December 4, 1961) is an American former stock car racing driver and crew chief from Matthews, North Carolina. Reary competed in three NASCAR O'Reilly Auto Parts Series races in 2003. Reary also served as crew chief for Brian Sockwell for one race during the 2008 NASCAR Craftsman Truck Series.

== Motorsports career results ==
=== NASCAR ===
(key) (Bold – Pole position awarded by qualifying time. Italics – Pole position earned by points standings or practice time. * – Most laps led.)

==== Busch Series ====
NASCAR Busch Series results
Year	Team	No.	Make	1	2	3	4	5	6	7	8	9	10	11	12	13	14	15	16	17	18	19	20	21	22	23	24	25	26	27	28	29	30	31	32	33	34	NBSC	Pts	Ref
2003	Jay Robinson Racing	39	Ford	DAY	CAR	LVS	DAR	BRI	TEX	TAL	NSH	CAL	RCH	GTY	NZH	CLT	DOV	NSH	KEN	MLW	DAY	CHI	NHA	PPR	IRP; 31	MCH	BRI	DAR	RCH	DOV	KAN	CLT						95th	174	
2003	Bost Motorsports	22	Chevy																														MEM; 38	ATL	PHO; 36	CAR; DNQ	HOM	95th	174	
