= Blake Mallory =

American racing driver (born 1980)

- Born: March 2, 1980 (age 46); Joshua, Texas, U.S.

NASCAR O'Reilly Auto Parts Series career
- 3 races run over 3 years
- Best finish: 100th (2003)
- First race: 2003 GNC Live Well 250 (Milwaukee)
- Last race: 2003 Aaron's 312 (Atlanta)
Wins	Top tens	Poles
0	0	0

NASCAR FedEx Freight Truck Series career
- 8 races run over 6 years
- Best finish: 62nd (2003)
- First race: 2002 Power Stroke Diesel 200 (Indianapolis)
- Last race: 2007 Sam's Town 400 (Texas)
Wins	Top tens	Poles
0	0	0
- Statistics up to date as of November 7, 2024.

Blake Mallory (born March 2, 1980) is an American professional stock car racing driver who has competed in the NASCAR Busch Series, and the NASCAR Craftsman Truck Series.

Mallory has also competed in series such as the NASCAR West Series, the USRA Super Late Model Series, and the World of Outlaws.

== Motorsports career results ==
=== NASCAR ===
(key) (Bold - Pole position awarded by qualifying time. Italics - Pole position earned by points standings or practice time. * – Most laps led.)

==== Busch Series ====
NASCAR Busch Series results
Year	Team	No.	Make	1	2	3	4	5	6	7	8	9	10	11	12	13	14	15	16	17	18	19	20	21	22	23	24	25	26	27	28	29	30	31	32	33	34	35	NBSC	Pts	Ref
2003	Jay Robinson Racing	39	Ford	DAY	CAR	LVS	DAR	BRI	TEX	TAL	NSH	CAL	RCH	GTY	NZH	CLT	DOV	NSH	KEN	MLW; 32	DAY	CHI	NHA	PPR	IRP	MCH	BRI	DAR	RCH	DOV				ATL; 40	PHO; DNQ	CAR	HOM		100th	162	
2003	Bost Motorsports	22	Chevy																												KAN; 37	CLT	MEM						100th	162	
2004	Davis Motorsports	0	Chevy	DAY	CAR	LVS	DAR	BRI	TEX; DNQ	NSH	TAL	CAL	GTY	RCH	NZH	CLT	DOV	NSH	KEN	MLW	DAY																		N/A	0	
2004	Ware Racing Enterprises	51	Chevy																			CHI; DNQ	NHA	PPR	IRP	MCH	BRI	CAL	RCH	DOV	KAN	CLT	MEM	ATL; DNQ	PHO				N/A	0	
2004	Jay Robinson Racing	28	Ford																																	DAR; DNQ	HOM; DNQ		N/A	0	
2005	GIC-Mixon Motorsports	24	Chevy	DAY	CAL	MXC	LVS	ATL; DNQ	NSH; DNQ	BRI	TEX	PHO	TAL	DAR	RCH	CLT	DOV	NSH	KEN	MLW	DAY	CHI	NHA	PPR	GTY	IRP	GLN	MCH	BRI	CAL	RCH	DOV	KAN	CLT	MEM	TEX	PHO	HOM	N/A	0	

==== Craftsman Truck Series ====
NASCAR Craftsman Truck Series results
Year	Team	No.	Make	1	2	3	4	5	6	7	8	9	10	11	12	13	14	15	16	17	18	19	20	21	22	23	24	25	NCTC	Pts	Ref
2002	Larry Richardson	37	Chevy	DAY	DAR	MAR	GTY	PPR	DOV	TEX	MEM; DNQ	MLW	KAN	KEN	NHA	MCH													67th	182	
2002	Ware Racing Enterprises	51	Dodge														IRP; 21	NSH	RCH	TEX	SBO	LVS	CAL						67th	182	
2002	MacDonald Motorsports	72	Chevy																					PHO; 27	HOM				67th	182	
2003	Green Light Racing	07	Chevy	DAY	DAR	MMR	MAR	CLT	DOV	TEX	MEM; 31	MLW	KAN																62nd	346	
2003	Ron Rhodes Racing	36	Dodge											KEN; DNQ															62nd	346	
2003	MLB Motorsports	66	Dodge												GTW; 24	MCH	IRP	NSH; 23	BRI	RCH	NHA								62nd	346	
2003	Keller Motorsports	27	Chevy																			CAL; DNQ	LVS	SBO					62nd	346	
2003	Ware Racing Enterprises	51	Dodge																						TEX; 24	MAR	PHO	HOM	62nd	346	
2004	Grape Racing	35	Chevy	DAY	ATL	MAR	MFD	CLT	DOV	TEX	MEM	MLW	KAN	KEN	GTW	MCH	IRP	NSH	BRI	RCH	NHA	LVS	CAL	TEX; DNQ	MAR	PHO	DAR	HOM	N/A	0	
2005	Oostlander Racing	21	Chevy	DAY	CAL	ATL	MAR	GTY	MFD; DNQ	CLT	DOV																		87th	61	
2005	Mighty Motorsports	24	Chevy									TEX; 34	MCH; DNQ	MLW	KAN														87th	61	
2005	Jeff Milburn Racing	76	Chevy													KEN; DNQ	MEM	IRP	NSH	BRI	RCH	NHA	LVS	MAR	ATL	TEX; DNQ	PHO	HOM	87th	61	
2006	Jeff Milburn Racing	76	Chevy	DAY	CAL	ATL	MAR	GTY	CLT	MFD	DOV	TEX; DNQ	MCH	MLW	KAN	KEN	MEM	IRP	NSH	BRI	NHA	LVS	TAL	MAR	ATL	TEX	PHO	HOM	N/A	0	
2007	Green Light Racing	06	Chevy	DAY	CAL	ATL	MAR	KAN	CLT	MFD	DOV	TEX; 36	MCH	MLW	MEM	KEN	IRP	NSH	BRI	GTW	NHA	LVS	TAL	MAR	ATL	TEX	PHO	HOM	119th	0	

==== West Series ====
NASCAR West Series results
Year	Team	No.	Make	1	2	3	4	5	6	7	8	9	10	11	12	13	NWSC	Pts	Ref
2002	Dick Midgley	09	Chevy	PHO	LVS	CAL	KAN	EVG	IRW	S99	RMR	DCS; 19	LVS; 16				35th	221	
2004	David Eshleman	6	Chevy	PHO	MMR	CAL; 22	S99	EVG	IRW	S99	RMR	DCS	PHO	CNS	MMR	IRW	63rd	97	
