= Bill Hoff =

American racing driver

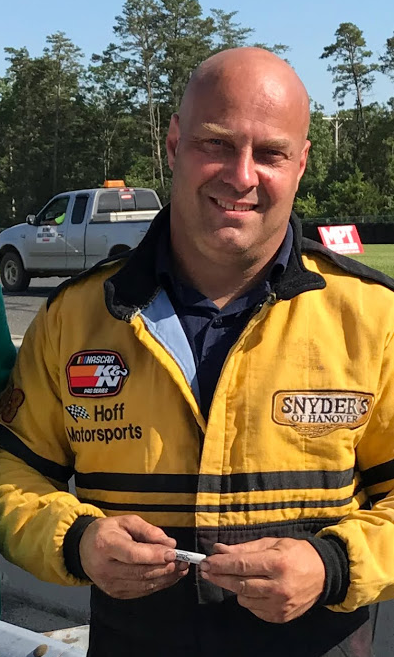
- Hoff at a NASCAR K&N Pro Series East race in 2018
- Born: August 27, 1964 (age 62); Ivyland, Pennsylvania, U.S.

NASCAR O'Reilly Auto Parts Series career
- 22 races run over 6 years
- Best finish: 62nd (2001)
- First race: 1996 Stanley 200 (Loudon)
- Last race: 2004 Alan Kulwicki 250 (Milwaukee)
Wins	Top tens	Poles
0	0	0
- Statistics up to date as of June 16, 2018.

Bill Hoff (born August 27, 1964) is an American stock car racing driver. He last competed part-time in the NASCAR K&N Pro Series East, driving the No. 71 Chevrolet for Ace Motorsports. Previously, Hoff ran in NASCAR's Busch Series on a limited schedule from 1996 to 2004, usually competing at tracks in the Northeast. He is also a radio broadcaster on 93.3 WMMR in Philadelphia, Pennsylvania.

== Early career ==
Hoff drove a Formula Atlantic car in SCCA Amateur competition from 1990 to 1992. He spent 1994 testing a Lola-Cosworth Indy car.

== NASCAR ==
=== Busch Series ===
Hoff made his debut in 1996, running the No. 59 Chevy at New Hampshire. He started the race in 40th and finished 39th. He then returned to the fall race at Dover, repeating his New Hampshire feat with a 40th place start and 39th-place finish. He did not complete either race and the longest he lasted in one was twelve laps at New Hampshire.

Hoff would make one start in 1997. He started 34th and finished 35th at Nazareth.

Hoff's busiest season was in 2001. As the economy was in a recession, Hoff seized the opportunity to make the races that not a lot of teams showed up to, running nine races for his own No. 93 Hoff Racing team. He finished 41st in his first start of the year at Rockingham, not finishing as the last car despite only running twenty laps. Hoff would not finish any of his other starts, either. However, he did manage a best finish of 33rd at Watkins Glen. He also set his best career start of 38th at Gateway. Hoff finished 62nd in points, his best career showing.

Hoff scaled his schedule down to five races in 2002. His best run of the year was at Nazareth, where he managed 35th. He also matched his best career qualifying effort of 38th there. His other runs only managed 36th, 41st, 42nd and 43rd.

Hoff ran three races in 2003, running the first two for his own team. After a 34th at Nazareth, Hoff ran an eventual career-best 24th at New Hampshire. Despite not completing twenty of the laps, it was Hoff's first career race that he finished. Then, at Dover, Hoff ran a Bost Motorsports car. He started that race in his career-best 28th before finishing 38th.

Hoff made two more starts in 2004. After finishing 37th at Nazareth and 35th at Milwaukee, Hoff shut down his team. Hoff's career totaled twenty-two starts.

=== K&N Pro Series East ===
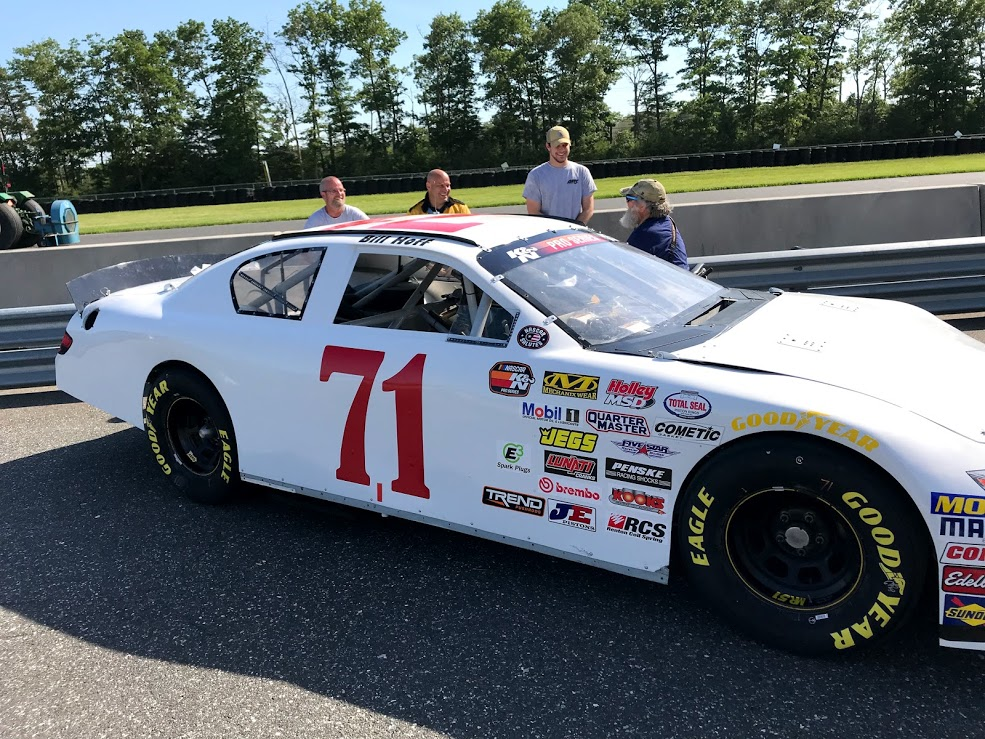
Hoff's K&N Pro Series East car at New Jersey Motorsports Park in 2018

In 2000, Hoff attempted one race in what was then the NASCAR Busch North Series at Nazareth Speedway, which was a combined race in conjunction with the Busch Series. However, he failed to qualify for the event.

Hoff returned to NASCAR racing during the 2018 NASCAR K&N Pro Series East season. He finished sixteenth at New Jersey Motorsports Park, failing to complete a single lap due to mechanical issues. Hoff entered his No. 71 Chevrolet again at Thompson Speedway Motorsports Park, but withdrew after engine trouble in practice.

== Motorsports career results ==
=== NASCAR ===
(key) (Bold – Pole position awarded by qualifying time. Italics – Pole position earned by points standings or practice time. * – Most laps led.)

==== Busch Series ====
NASCAR Busch Series results
Year	Team	No.	Make	1	2	3	4	5	6	7	8	9	10	11	12	13	14	15	16	17	18	19	20	21	22	23	24	25	26	27	28	29	30	31	32	33	34	NBSC	Pts	Ref
1996	Tim Durbin	86	Olds	DAY	CAR	RCH	ATL	NSV	DAR	BRI	HCY	NZH; DNQ	CLT	DOV	SBO	MYB	GLN	MLW																				87th	92	
1996	M.P.H. Racing	59	Chevy																NHA; 39	TAL	IRP	MCH	BRI	DAR	RCH													87th	92	
1996	Tim Durbin	86	Chevy																							DOV; 39	CLT	CAR	HOM									87th	92	
1997	Tim Durbin	86	Chevy	DAY	CAR	RCH	ATL	LVS	DAR	HCY	TEX	BRI	NSV	TAL	NHA	NZH; 35	CLT	DOV	SBO	GLN	MLW	MYB	GTY; DNQ	IRP	MCH	BRI	DAR; DNQ	RCH; DNQ	DOV; DNQ	CLT	CAL	CAR; DNQ	HOM					107th	58	
2000	Hoff Motorsports	93	Chevy	DAY	CAR	LVS	ATL	DAR	BRI	TEX	NSV	TAL	CAL	RCH	NHA	CLT	DOV	SBO	MYB	GLN	MLW	NZH; DNQ	PPR	GTY	IRP; DNQ	MCH	BRI	DAR	RCH; DNQ	DOV	CLT	CAR	MEM	PHO	HOM			N/A	-	
2001	Hoff Motorsports	93	Chevy	DAY	CAR; 41	LVS	ATL	DAR	BRI	TEX	NSH	TAL	CAL	RCH	NHA	NZH; 37	CLT		KEN; DNQ	MLW; 35	GLN; 33	CHI	GTY; 42	PPR						DOV; 43	KAN	CLT	MEM	PHO				62nd	374	
2001	Hoff Motorsports	99	Chevy															DOV; 39							IRP; 40	MCH	BRI	DAR	RCH									62nd	374	
2001	Hoff Motorsports	93	Pontiac																																CAR; 43	HOM		62nd	374	
2002	Hoff Motorsports	93	Pontiac	DAY	CAR; 43	LVS	DAR	BRI	TEX	NSH	TAL	CAL	RCH	NHA	NZH; 35	CLT	DOV; 42	NSH	KEN	MLW; 36	DAY	CHI	GTY	PPR	IRP	MCH	BRI	DAR; 41	RCH	DOV; DNQ	KAN	CLT	MEM	ATL	CAR	PHO	HOM	81st	224	
2003	Hoff Motorsports	93	Pontiac	DAY	CAR	LVS	DAR	BRI	TEX	TAL	NSH	CAL	RCH	GTY	NZH; 34	CLT	DOV	NSH	KEN	MLW	DAY	CHI																91st	201	
2003	Hoff Motorsports	93	Chevy																				NHA; 24	PPR	IRP; DNQ	MCH	BRI	DAR	RCH									91st	201	
2003	Bost Motorsports	22	Chevy																											DOV; 38	KAN	CLT	MEM	ATL	PHO	CAR	HOM	91st	201	
2004	Hoff Motorsports	93	Chevy	DAY	CAR	LVS	DAR	BRI	TEX	NSH	TAL	CAL	GTY	RCH	NZH; 37	CLT	DOV	NSH	KEN	MLW; 35	DAY	CHI	NHA; DNQ	PPR	IRP	MCH	BRI	CAL	RCH	DOV; DNQ	KAN	CLT	MEM	ATL	PHO	DAR	HOM	114th	110	

==== K&N Pro Series East ====
NASCAR K&N Pro Series East results
Year	Team	No.	Make	1	2	3	4	5	6	7	8	9	10	11	12	13	14	15	16	17	18	19	NKNPSEC	Pts	Ref
2000	Hoff Motorsports	93	Chevy	LEE	NHA	SEE	HOL	BEE	JEN	GLN	STA	NHA	NZH; DNQ	STA	WFD	GLN	EPP	TMP	THU	BEE	NHA	LRP	N/A	-	
2018	Ace Motorsports	71	Chevy	NSM	BRI	LGY	SBO	SBO	MEM	NJM; 16	TMP; Wth	NHA	IOW	GLN; 25	GTW	NHA; Wth	DOV						38th	47	
2019	Ace Motorsports	71	Chevy	NSM	BRI	SBO	SBO	MEM	NHA; 15	IOW	GLN; 13	BRI	GTW	NHA; 14	DOV; 12								20th	122	

=== ARCA Re/Max Series ===
(key) (Bold – Pole position awarded by qualifying time. Italics – Pole position earned by points standings or practice time. * – Most laps led.)

ARCA Re/Max Series results
Year	Team	No.	Make	1	2	3	4	5	6	7	8	9	10	11	12	13	14	15	16	17	18	19	20	21	22	23	24	25	ARMC	Pts	Ref
2001	Hoff Motorsports	93	Ford	DAY; DNQ	NSH	WIN	SLM	GTY	KEN	CLT	KAN	MCH	POC	MEM	GLN	KEN	MCH	POC	NSH	ISF	CHI	DSF	SLM	TOL	BLN	CLT	TAL	ATL	N/A	0	
