= Justin Ashburn =

American racing driver

- Born: December 23, 1981 (age 44); Joelton, Tennessee, U.S.
- Awards: 1997 Highland Rim Speedway Rookie of the Year; 1999 Highland Rim Speedway Most Improved Driver

NASCAR O'Reilly Auto Parts Series career
- 30 races run over 8 years
- 2009 position: 147th
- Best finish: 58th (2003)
- First race: 2003 darlingtonraceway.com 200 (Darlington)
- Last race: 2009 Stater Brothers 300 (Fontana)
Wins	Top tens	Poles
0	0	0
- Statistics up to date as of May 18, 2020.

Justin Ashburn (born December 23, 1981) is an American professional stock car racing driver who competed in both the NASCAR Nationwide Series and the ARCA Re/Max Series from 2002 to 2009, driving for the Day Enterprise Racing team in nearly all of his starts in both series.

== Racing career ==
In 1997, Ashburn won the Rookie of the Year award at Highland Rim Speedway and finished fifth in points in the pro-modified series. Two years later, he won the Most Improved Driver award after winning ten races and finishing fourth in points. He then moved on to race at Nashville Fairgrounds in the Winston Racing Series, posting four top-tens in 2001.

=== Busch Series ===
Ashburn made his Busch Series debut in 2003, running a second Day Enterprises car. Driving the No. 61 Chevrolet, Ashburn started and finished 42nd at Darlington Raceway. Ashburn failed to finish eleven of thirteen starts for the team. His best finish was a twentieth-place finish at Nashville Superspeedway in June 2003. Ashburn also made a one-off start for Bost Motorsports, finishing 41st at Michigan Speedway after his Day Enterprises car failed to qualify.

Ashburn moved to the team's primary car, the No. 16, for 2004. However, the team struggled to qualify for races early and had to scale back to a limited schedule. As a result, Ashburn only qualified for eight races in 2004, failing to finish six of them. His best finish was a 29th at Talladega Superspeedway. He also led his first career lap under caution in the July race at Daytona International Speedway.

Ashburn made only one start in 2006, at Talladega. Avoiding a wreck early, Ashburn hung on to the back of the draft and earned his career-best finish of fourteenth, his first career lead lap finish. In 2007, he ran two races, earning a best finish of 22nd at Talladega. Ashburn made three start and park appearances in 2008, including his debut with the No. 57 Chevrolet owned by Chad Beahr. For 2009, Ashburn made only one appearance, parking after five laps in the Stater Brothers 300 at Auto Club Speedway.

== Motorsports career results ==
=== NASCAR ===
(key) (Bold – Pole position awarded by qualifying time. Italics – Pole position earned by points standings or practice time. * – Most laps led.)

==== Nationwide Series ====
NASCAR Busch Series results
Year	Team	No.	Make	1	2	3	4	5	6	7	8	9	10	11	12	13	14	15	16	17	18	19	20	21	22	23	24	25	26	27	28	29	30	31	32	33	34	35	NBSC	Pts	Ref
2002	Day Enterprise Racing	61	Pontiac	DAY	CAR	LVS	DAR	BRI	TEX	NSH	TAL	CAL	RCH	NHA	NZH	CLT	DOV	NSH	KEN	MLW	DAY	CHI	GTY	PPR	IRP	MCH	BRI	DAR	RCH	DOV	KAN	CLT	MEM; DNQ	ATL	CAR	PHO	HOM		N/A	0	
2003	Day Enterprise Racing	61	Pontiac	DAY	CAR; DNQ	LVS					NSH; 37	CAL		GTY; 26																									58th	646	
2003	Day Enterprise Racing	61	Chevy				DAR; 42	BRI	TEX	TAL			RCH; DNQ		NZH; 37	CLT	DOV	NSH; 20	KEN; DNQ	MLW; 43	DAY	CHI	NHA; 43	PPR; 35	IRP; 43	MCH; DNQ		DAR; 38		DOV; 43	KAN	CLT	MEM; DNQ	ATL; DNQ	PHO; 43	CAR; DNQ	HOM; DNQ		58th	646	
2003	Bost Motorsports	22	Chevy																							MCH; 41													58th	646	
2003	Day Enterprise Racing	60	Chevy																								BRI; DNQ												58th	646	
2003	Day Enterprise Racing	6	Chevy																										RCH; 42										58th	646	
2004	Day Enterprise Racing	16	Chevy	DAY; 34	CAR; 40	LVS; 38	DAR; 40	BRI; DNQ	TEX; DNQ	NSH; DNQ	TAL; 29	CAL	GTY; 38	RCH	NZH	CLT	DOV	NSH; DNQ	KEN; DNQ	MLW; 30	DAY; 40	CHI	NHA	PPR	IRP	MCH	BRI	CAL	RCH	DOV	KAN	CLT	MEM	ATL	PHO	DAR	HOM		69th	394	
2005	Day Enterprise Racing	16	Chevy	DAY; DNQ	CAL	MXC	LVS	ATL	NSH	BRI; DNQ	TEX	PHO	TAL; 14	DAR	RCH	CLT	DOV	NSH; DNQ	KEN	MLW	DAY	CHI	NHA	PPR	GTY	IRP	GLN	MCH	BRI	CAL	RCH	DOV	KAN	CLT	MEM; DNQ	TEX	PHO	HOM	147th		
2006	Day Enterprise Racing	05	Chevy	DAY	CAL	MXC	LVS	ATL	BRI	TEX	NSH	PHO	TAL; 42	RCH	DAR	CLT	DOV	NSH	KEN	MLW	DAY	CHI	NHA	MAR	GTY	IRP	GLN	MCH	BRI	CAL	RCH	DOV	KAN	CLT	MEM	TEX	PHO	HOM	144th	37	
2007	Day Enterprise Racing	05	Chevy	DAY	CAL	MXC	LVS	ATL	BRI	NSH	TEX	PHO	TAL; 22	RCH	DAR	CLT	DOV	NSH; DNQ	KEN	MLW	NHA	DAY; 43	CHI; DNQ	GTY	IRP	CGV	GLN	MCH	BRI	CAL	RCH	DOV	KAN	CLT	MEM	TEX	PHO	HOM	119th	134	
2008	Beahr Racing Enterprises	57	Dodge	DAY	CAL	LVS	ATL	BRI	NSH	TEX	PHO	MXC	TAL; 38	RCH	DAR	CLT	DOV	NSH	KEN																				113th	117	
2008	Day Enterprise Racing	05	Chevy																	MLW; 43	NHA; 43	DAY; DNQ	CHI	GTY	IRP	CGV	GLN	MCH	BRI	CAL	RCH	DOV	KAN	CLT	MEM	TEX	PHO	HOM	113th	117	
2009	Day Enterprise Racing	85	Chevy	DAY; Wth																																			147th	40	
2009	Day Enterprise Racing	05	Chevy		CAL; 41	LVS	BRI	TEX	NSH	PHO	TAL	RCH	DAR	CLT	DOV	NSH	KEN	MLW	NHA	DAY	CHI	GTY	IRP	IOW	GLN	MCH	BRI	CGV	ATL	RCH	DOV	KAN	CAL	CLT	MEM	TEX	PHO	HOM	147th	40	

=== ARCA Re/Max Series ===
(key) (Bold – Pole position awarded by qualifying time. Italics – Pole position earned by points standings or practice time. * – Most laps led.)

ARCA Re/Max Series results
Year	Team owner	No.	Make	1	2	3	4	5	6	7	8	9	10	11	12	13	14	15	16	17	18	19	20	21	22	23	ARMC	Pts	Ref
2002	Day Enterprise Racing	58	Chevy	DAY	ATL	NSH; 38	SLM																				86th	350	
2002	Day Enterprise Racing	58	Pontiac					KEN; 16	CLT	KAN	POC	MCH	TOL	SBO	KEN	BLN	POC	NSH; 15	ISF	WIN	DSF	CHI	SLM	TAL	CLT		86th	350	
2003	Day Enterprise Racing	58	Pontiac	DAY; 31	ATL	NSH; 30	SLM	TOL	KEN	CLT	BLN	KAN	MCH	LER	POC	POC	NSH	ISF	WIN	DSF	CHI	SLM	TAL	CLT	SBO		138th	145	
2004	Day Enterprise Racing	58	Chevy	DAY	NSH	SLM	KEN	TOL	CLT	KAN	POC	MCH	SBO	BLN	KEN	GTW	POC	LER	NSH	ISF	TOL	DSF	CHI	SLM	TAL; 37		185th	45	
2005	Day Enterprise Racing	6	Chevy	DAY; 28	NSH																						59th	550	
2005	Day Enterprise Racing	16	Chevy			SLM; DNQ	KEN	TOL	LAN	MIL	POC	MCH	KAN				GTW; 27										59th	550	
2005	Day Enterprise Racing	09	Ford											KEN; 36	BLN												59th	550	
2005	Day Enterprise Racing	09	Chevy													POC; 37											59th	550	
2005	Day Enterprise Racing	09	Pontiac																NSH; 33	MCH							59th	550	
2005	Day Enterprise Racing	90	Ford															LER; 30			ISF; 30	TOL	DSF	CHI	SLM	TAL	59th	550	
2006	Bobby Jones Racing	50	Ford	DAY	NSH	SLM	WIN	KEN	TOL	POC	MCH	KAN	KEN	BLN	POC; 41	GTW	NSH; 41	MCH	ISF	MIL	TOL	DSF	CHI	SLM	TAL		137th	110	
2006	Wayne Peterson Racing	0	Ford																							IOW; DNQ	137th	110	
2007	Day Enterprise Racing	90	Chevy	DAY; DNQ	USA																						114th	190	
2007	Day Enterprise Racing	14	Chevy			NSH; DNQ	SLM; 18	KAN	WIN	KEN	TOL	IOW	POC	MCH	BLN	KEN	POC	NSH	ISF	MIL	GTW	DSF	CHI	SLM	TAL	TOL	114th	190	

=== CARS Super Late Model Tour ===
(key)

CARS Super Late Model Tour results
Year	Team	No.	Make	1	2	3	4	5	6	7	8	9	CSLMTC	Pts	Ref
2018	N/A	98	Chevy	MYB	NSH; 26	ROU	HCY	BRI	AND	HCY	ROU	SBO	N/A	0	
