= Jeff Streeter =

American racing driver (born 1979)

- Born: November 25, 1979 (age 46); Vinton, Iowa, U.S.

NASCAR O'Reilly Auto Parts Series career
- 9 races run over 2 years
- Best finish: 87th (2003)
- First race: 2001 Pepsi 300 (Nashville)
- Last race: 2003 Sam's Town 250 (Memphis)
Wins	Top tens	Poles
0	0	0

ARCA Menards Series career
- 14 races run over 4 years
- Best finish: 19th (1997)
- First race: 1997 APCO EasyCare 300 (Atlanta)
- Last race: 2001 PFG Lester 150 (Nashville)
Wins	Top tens	Poles
0	1	0

ARCA Menards Series West career
- 13 races run over 2 years
- Best finish: 15th (1998)
- First race: 1997 Winston West 300K (Las Vegas)
- Last race: 1998 Sam's Town 125 (Las Vegas)
Wins	Top tens	Poles
0	0	0
- Statistics up to date as of June 3, 2025.

Jeffrey Streeter (born November 25, 1979) is an American former stock car racing driver. He was a part-time NASCAR Busch Series driver in 2001 and 2003.

== Racing career ==
=== ARCA Racing Series ===
Streeter made his debut in the ARCA Bondo/Mar-Hyde Series in 1997 at Atlanta Motor Speedway, starting eleventh and finishing fifteenth in a family-owned car. He would return to the series for the next race at Salem Speedway, qualifying a career best 8th place in the 31-car field and finishing a then-career best 13th place in the race. His career best finish in the series would occur just over a month later at Pocono Raceway, when he finished 9th. After competing in ten of the first eleven races, Streeter's 1997 ARCA season came to an end halfway through the season due to a lack of funding. He finished the season with one top ten finish, an average finish of 17.1, and ranked 25th in the final point standings.

After spending a season in the NASCAR Winston West Series, Streeter returned to ARCA two seasons later in 1999, where he and his family-owned team competed sparingly for three seasons. The team wound up failing to qualify in the majority of their attempts in this time period, making the field in just four of their nine attempts between 1999 and 2001. He earned just one top-twenty start and finish in these four races, both of which occurred at Salem Speedway (the site of his best career ARCA start) in 2000, when he started nineteenth and finished eighteenth.

Streeter's final ARCA appearance came a year later in the inaugural race at the newly opened Nashville Superspeedway. He qualified in last place and lasted just thirteen laps before retiring from the event, finishing in 32nd place.

=== Winston West Series ===
Streeter and his family-owned team moved over to NASCAR in 1997, competing in the regional Winston West Series between 1997 and 1998. After his 1997 ARCA season came to an early end, Streeter made his Winston West debut later that year at Las Vegas Motor Speedway, but would finish 36th in the 40-car field after lasting just thirteen laps.

After missing the first two races the following season, Streeter and his team were able to run the final twelve races of the 1998 season after picking up sponsorship from D&H Auto Body. Although the team didn't pick up any top ten finishes, Streeter did manage to finish in the top-sixteen six times during the season, including a best finish of eleventh place at Altamont Motorsports Park. Despite no top tens or lead lap finishes, Streeter was running at the finish in all but one of his starts and finished 15th in the point standings.

Streeter made one final attempt in the series in 1999, failing to qualifying for the season opener at Tucson Speedway.

=== Busch Series ===
Streeter made his debut in 2001 at Nashville Superspeedway, running a family-owned vehicle. He started 43rd and finished 41st after an early crash. His next race came at California, where he improved with a 36th-place finish. After a 37th-place finish at Dover, he set his year-long best of 29th at IRP.

Streeter ran five races in 2003, beginning with a 29th-place finish at California. Amazingly, Streeter finished 29th twice more in 2003: at Nazareth and at Memphis. That meant that 29th would be his best career finish four times over. His run at California also ended up being his best career start, as he started that event in eighteenth place.

Increased competition and low funding closed Streeter's team and he has not raced in major NASCAR since.

== Motorsports career results ==
=== NASCAR ===
(key) (Bold - Pole position awarded by qualifying time. Italics - Pole position earned by points standings or practice time. * – Most laps led.)

==== Busch Series ====
NASCAR Busch Series results
Year	Team	No.	Make	1	2	3	4	5	6	7	8	9	10	11	12	13	14	15	16	17	18	19	20	21	22	23	24	25	26	27	28	29	30	31	32	33	34	NBSC	Pts	Ref
2001	Streeter Racing	83	Chevy	DAY	CAR	LVS	ATL	DAR	BRI	TEX	NSH; 41	TAL	CAL; 36	RCH	NHA	NZH	CLT	DOV; 37	KEN	MLW	GLN	CHI	GTY	PPR	IRP; 29	MCH	BRI	DAR	RCH	DOV	KAN	CLT	MEM	PHO	CAR	HOM		88th	168	
2003	Streeter Racing	83	Chevy	DAY	CAR	LVS	DAR	BRI	TEX	TAL	NSH; DNQ	CAL; 29	RCH	GTY; 38	NZH; 29	CLT	DOV	NSH	KEN; 41	MLW	DAY	CHI	NHA	PPR	IRP	MCH	BRI	DAR	RCH	DOV; DNQ	KAN; DNQ		MEM; 29	ATL	PHO; DNQ	CAR	HOM	87th	241	
2003	Bost Motorsports	22	Chevy																													CLT; DNQ						87th	241	
