= Jimmy Henderson (racing driver) =

American racing driver (born 1983)

- Born: February 24, 1983 (age 43); Conyers, Georgia, U.S.

NASCAR O'Reilly Auto Parts Series career
- 3 races run over 2 years
- Best finish: 12th (2003)
- First race: 2003 Sams Town 250 Benefiting St. Jude (Memphis)
Wins	Top tens	Poles
0	0	0

ARCA Menards Series career
- 6 races run over 3 years
- Best finish: 7th (2003)
- First race: 2003 PFG Lester 150 (Nashville)
- Last race: 2004 Waste Management 200 (Nashville)
Wins	Top tens	Poles
0	2	0
- Statistics up to date as of December 3, 2024.

Jimmy Henderson (born February 24, 1983) is an American short course off-road racing driver who competes in Championship Off-Road's Pro 4 class.

Henderson also has stock car racing experience, competing in the ASA National Tour, the Southern All Star Super Late Model Series, NASCAR Busch Series, and ARCA Re/Max Series.

== Motorsports results ==
=== NASCAR ===
(key) (Bold – Pole position awarded by qualifying time. Italics – Pole position earned by points standings or practice time. * – Most laps led.)

==== Busch Series ====
NASCAR Busch Series results
Year	Team	No.	Make	1	2	3	4	5	6	7	8	9	10	11	12	13	14	15	16	17	18	19	20	21	22	23	24	25	26	27	28	29	30	31	32	33	34	NBSC	Pts	Ref
2003	Henderson Racing	63	Pontiac	DAY	CAR	LVS	DAR	BRI	TEX	TAL	NSH	CAL	RCH	GTY	NZH	CLT	DOV	NSH	KEN	MLW	DAY	CHI	NHA	PPR	IRP	MCH	BRI	DAR	RCH; DNQ	DOV; DNQ	KAN	CLT	MEM; 33					138th	64	
2003	Henderson Racing	63	Chevy																															ATL; DNQ	PHO	CAR	HOM	138th	64	
2004	Henderson Racing	63	Chevy	DAY	CAR	LVS	DAR	BRI	TEX	NSH	TAL	CAL	GTY	RCH	NZH	CLT	DOV	NSH	KEN	MLW	DAY	CHI	NHA	PPR	IRP	MCH	BRI	CAL	RCH	DOV	KAN	CLT; DNQ	MEM	ATL	PHO	DAR	HOM	N/A	0	

=== ARCA Re/Max Series ===
(key) (Bold – Pole position awarded by qualifying time. Italics – Pole position earned by points standings or practice time. * – Most laps led.)

ARCA Re/Max Series results
Year	Team	No.	Make	1	2	3	4	5	6	7	8	9	10	11	12	13	14	15	16	17	18	19	20	21	22	ARSC	Pts	Ref
2003	Henderson Racing	63	Chevy	DAY	ATL; DNQ	NSH; 13	SLM	TOL	KEN; Wth	CLT; 9	BLN	KAN	MCH; 7	LER	POC	POC; 39	NSH	ISF	WIN	DSF	CHI	SLM	TAL	CLT	SBO	45th	630	
2004	C. E. Clover	35	Chevy	DAY	NSH	SLM	KEN	TOL	CLT	KAN	POC	MCH	SBO	BLN	KEN; 15	GTW	POC	LER	NSH; 30	ISF	TOL	DSF	CHI	SLM	TAL; DNQ	96th	260	
