= Brent Moore (racing driver) =

American racing driver

- Born: February 8, 1978 (age 48); Pickens, South Carolina, U.S.

NASCAR O'Reilly Auto Parts Series career
- 2 races run over 2 years
- Best finish: 125th (2002)
- First race: 2002 NetZero 250 (Pikes Peak)
- Last race: 2003 Kroger 200 Presented by Tom Raper RVs (Indianapolis)
| Wins | Top tens | Poles |
|---|---|---|
| 0 | 0 | 0 |
- Statistics up to date as of January 4, 2025.

Brent Moore (born February 8, 1978) is an American former professional stock car racing driver who has competed in the NASCAR Busch Series and the NASCAR Goody's Dash Series.

Moore has also competed in the X-1R Pro Cup Series and the UARA STARS Late Model Series.

== Motorsports results ==
=== NASCAR ===
(key) (Bold - Pole position awarded by qualifying time. Italics - Pole position earned by points standings or practice time. * – Most laps led.)

==== Busch Series ====
NASCAR Busch Series results
| Year | Team | No. | Make | 1 | 2 | 3 | 4 | 5 | 6 | 7 | 8 | 9 | 10 | 11 | 12 | 13 | 14 | 15 | 16 | 17 | 18 | 19 | 20 | 21 | 22 | 23 | 24 | 25 | 26 | 27 | 28 | 29 | 30 | 31 | 32 | 33 | 34 | NBSC | Pts | Ref |
|---|---|---|---|---|---|---|---|---|---|---|---|---|---|---|---|---|---|---|---|---|---|---|---|---|---|---|---|---|---|---|---|---|---|---|---|---|---|---|---|---|
| 2002 | ORTEC Racing | 96 | Chevy | DAY | CAR | LVS | DAR | BRI | TEX | NSH | TAL | CAL | RCH | NHA | NZH | CLT | DOV | NSH | KEN | MLW | DAY | CHI | GTY | PPR; 43 | IRP | MCH | BRI | DAR | RCH | DOV | KAN | CLT | MEM | ATL | CAR | PHO | HOM | 125th | 34 | |
| 2003 | ORTEC Racing | 96 | Chevy | DAY | CAR | LVS | DAR | BRI | TEX | TAL | NSH | CAL | RCH | GTY | NZH | CLT | DOV | NSH | KEN | MLW | DAY | CHI | NHA | PPR | IRP; 27 | MCH | BRI | DAR | RCH | DOV | KAN | CLT | MEM; DNQ | ATL | PHO | CAR | HOM | 131st | 87 | |

==== Goody's Dash Series ====
NASCAR Goody's Dash Series results
| Year | Team | No. | Make | 1 | 2 | 3 | 4 | 5 | 6 | 7 | 8 | 9 | 10 | 11 | 12 | 13 | 14 | 15 | 16 | 17 | 18 | 19 | 20 | 21 | NGDS | Pts | Ref |
|---|---|---|---|---|---|---|---|---|---|---|---|---|---|---|---|---|---|---|---|---|---|---|---|---|---|---|---|
| 1996 | N/A | 75 | Ford | DAY | HOM | MYB | SUM | NSV | TRI | CAR | HCY | FLO | BRI | SUM | GRE | SNM | BGS | MYB | LAN | STH | FLO | NWS | VOL; 18 | HCY | N/A | 0 | |
| 1998 | Holiday & Moore Racing | 06 | Pontiac | DAY | HCY; 23 | | CLT; 31 | TRI; 13 | LAN | BRI | SUM | GRE | ROU | SNM | MYB | CON | HCY | LAN | STA | LOU | VOL | USA | HOM | | 45th | 512 | |
| 1998 | Holiday & Moore Racing | 06 | Ford | | | CAR; 13 | | | | | | | | | | | | | | | | | | | 45th | 512 | |
| 1999 | N/A | 75 | Ford | DAY; 31 | HCY; 13 | CAR; 14 | CLT; 6 | BRI; 25 | LOU; 11 | SUM; 15 | GRE; 14 | ROU; 16 | STA; 15 | MYB; 15 | HCY; 16 | LAN; 18 | USA; 19 | JAC; 26 | LAN; 16 | | | | | | 14th | 1803 | |
| 2000 | N/A | 75 | Ford | DAY; 14 | MON | STA | JAC | CAR | CLT; 11 | SBO | ROU | LOU | SUM | GRE; 7 | SNM | MYB; 14 | BRI | HCY | JAC | USA; DNQ | LAN; 12 | | | | 29th | 645 | |
| 2001 | N/A | 75 | Ford | DAY | ROU | DAR | CLT | LOU | JAC | KEN | SBO | DAY | GRE; 23 | SNM | NRV | MYB; 28 | BRI | ACE | JAC; 6 | USA; 13 | NSH | | | | 36th | 447 | |
