= Gus Wasson =

American NASCAR driver (born 1974)

- Born: March 28, 1974 (age 52); Bloomdale, Ohio, U.S.

NASCAR O'Reilly Auto Parts Series career
- 51 races run over 7 years
- Best finish: 26th (2004)
- First race: 1998 Stihl 300 (Atlanta)
- Last race: 2004 Bi-Lo 200 (Darlington)
Wins	Top tens	Poles
0	0	0

Gus Wasson (born March 28, 1974) is an American former stock car racing driver. Gus is the son of Paul and Kathy Wasson. He competed part-time in NASCAR's Busch Series from 1998 to 2004.

== Busch Series Career ==
Wasson made his Busch Series debut in 1998, making a one-off start at Atlanta Motor Speedway in the No. 49 Hoiles Motorsports Chevy. Wasson qualified seventeenth and despite spinning out early on the 73rd lap, he stayed in that vicinity for the entire race, and he ended the race with an 18th-place finish.

Wasson qualified for five races in 1999. Running the No. 49 car again, Wasson went out again at Atlanta and did in his season debut as he had in his series debut: finish a solid eighteenth. Wasson made one other run with the team in 1999, this time coming at Lowe's, where Wasson slid a little to a 25th-place finish. However, the team folded without sponsorship and Wasson moved to the No. 96 Island Oasis Chevy the other three races. Wasson struggled to find chemistry with this team, only managing a best finish of 31st at Charlotte.

Wasson still, though, had the ride for the full 2000 season. However, Wasson only made three of the first six races, and the team split with Wasson, and it would later dissolve a few months later. Wasson only managed a pair of 33rds and a 35th in his starts, but did earn his best qualifying effort of his career at Bristol.

Wasson only made one start in 2001, pairing with the same Hoiles team he had driven for in 1999. The team, back together for one race, started it at Darlington. Wasson made it in the race at 35th, but struggled and finished in that same position.

Wasson made his lone start in 2002 at Nazareth Speedway, making his first start with ORTEC Racing. He started 42nd, but his day was very short. On the first lap, Wasson crashed and left the race before completing a lap in 43rd position.

Wasson is credited to nine races in 2003, a welcome increase to Wasson after some quiet years. He made three starts with ORTEC. He had a pair of 19ths at Bristol and Nashville Superspeedway, as well as a 22nd at Kentucky. The other six came in Davis Motorsports's No. 70 and No. 0 Chevys. Wasson's best finish with them was a 29th at Atlanta.

Wasson had his busiest year in NASCAR was in 2004, when he once again split time with ORTEC and Davis Motorsports. For ORTEC, Wasson managed to match his best career finish: eighteenth in the season opener at Daytona International Raceway. After ORTEC began shutting down after Texas, Wasson moved to the No. 10 Race Girl Chevy for Davis Motorsports. Sadly for Wasson, many of the first races were to park the car right after starting, though Wasson did begin to run the full races later in the year. Once that happened, Wasson had a best of 22nd at Nashville. His last career start to this point came at Darlington, when he finished 28th. Wasson currently works at Merchants Distributors, Inc. in Hickory, NC.

== Motorsports career results ==
=== NASCAR ===
(key) (Bold – Pole position awarded by qualifying time. Italics – Pole position earned by points standings or practice time. * – Most laps led.)

==== Busch Series ====
NASCAR Busch Series results
Year	Team	No.	Make	1	2	3	4	5	6	7	8	9	10	11	12	13	14	15	16	17	18	19	20	21	22	23	24	25	26	27	28	29	30	31	32	33	34	NBSC	Pts	Ref
1998	Hoiles Motorsports	49	Chevy	DAY	CAR	LVS	NSV	DAR	BRI	TEX	HCY	TAL	NHA	NZH	CLT	DOV	RCH	PPR	GLN	MLW	MYB	CAL	SBO	IRP	MCH	BRI	DAR	RCH	DOV	CLT	GTY	CAR	ATL; 18	HOM; DNQ				99th	109	
1999	Hoiles Motorsports	49	Chevy	DAY	CAR	LVS	ATL; 18	DAR	TEX	NSV	BRI	TAL	CAL	NHA	RCH	NZH	CLT; 26	DOV	SBO	GLN	MLW	MYB	PPR															73rd	358	
1999	Petty-Huggins Motorsports	96	Chevy																					GTY; DNQ	IRP; DNQ	MCH; DNQ	BRI; 36	DAR	RCH	DOV	CLT; 43	CAR	MEM	PHO	HOM; 31			73rd	358	
2000	Petty-Huggins Motorsports	96	Chevy	DAY; DNQ	CAR; 33	LVS; DNQ	ATL; DNQ	DAR; 35	BRI; 33	TEX	NSV	TAL	CAL	RCH	NHA	CLT	DOV	SBO	MYB	GLN	MLW	NZH	PPR	GTY	IRP	MCH	BRI	DAR	RCH	DOV	CLT	CAR	MEM	PHO	HOM			83rd	186	
2001	Hoiles Motorsports	96	Chevy	DAY	CAR	LVS	ATL	DAR; 35	BRI	TEX	NSH	TAL	CAL	RCH	NHA	NZH	CLT	DOV	KEN	MLW	GLN	CHI	GTY	PPR	IRP	MCH	BRI	DAR	RCH	DOV	KAN	CLT	MEM	PHO	CAR	HOM		123rd	58	
2002	ORTEC Racing	96	Chevy	DAY	CAR	LVS	DAR	BRI	TEX	NSH	TAL	CAL	RCH	NHA	NZH; 43	CLT	DOV	NSH	KEN	MLW	DAY	CHI	GTY	PPR	IRP	MCH	BRI	DAR; DNQ	RCH	DOV	KAN	CLT	MEM	ATL	CAR	PHO	HOM	127th	-	
2003	ORTEC Racing	96	Chevy	DAY	CAR	LVS	DAR	BRI; 19		TAL; DNQ	NSH	CAL	RCH	GTY	NZH	CLT	DOV; DNQ	NSH; 19	KEN; 22	MLW	DAY	CHI	NHA	PPR	IRP	MCH	BRI											56th	672	
2003	Brian Weber & Associates Racing	84	Chevy						TEX; DNQ																													56th	672	
2003	Davis Motorsports	70	Chevy																									DAR; 37	RCH	DOV	KAN; 40	CLT; DNQ	MEM					56th	672	
2003	Davis Motorsports	0	Chevy																															ATL; 29	PHO; 31	CAR; 34	HOM; 34	56th	672	
2004	ORTEC Racing	96	Chevy	DAY; 18	CAR; 29	LVS; 35	DAR; 31	BRI; 35	TEX; 40																													26th	2239	
2004	Davis Motorsports	10	Chevy							NSH; 33		CAL; 36	GTY; 25	RCH; 25	NZH; 26	CLT; 24	DOV; 33	NSH; 22	KEN; 35	MLW; 28	DAY; 37	CHI; 29	NHA; 24	PPR; 31	IRP; 37	MCH; 26	BRI; 40	CAL; 31	RCH; 36	DOV; 28	KAN; 28	CLT; DNQ	MEM; 26	ATL; 31	PHO; 31	DAR; 28	HOM; DNQ	26th	2239	
2004	Davis Motorsports	0	Chevy								TAL; DNQ																											26th	2239	

=== ARCA Bondo/Mar-Hyde Series ===
(key) (Bold – Pole position awarded by qualifying time. Italics – Pole position earned by points standings or practice time. * – Most laps led.)

ARCA Bondo/Mar-Hyde Series results
Year	Team	No.	Make	1	2	3	4	5	6	7	8	9	10	11	12	13	14	15	16	17	18	19	20	21	22	ABSC	Pts	Ref
1998	Hoiles Motorsports	30	Chevy	DAY	ATL	SLM	CLT	MEM	MCH	POC	SBS	TOL	PPR	POC	KIL	FRS	ISF	ATL	DSF	SLM	TEX; 5	WIN	CLT; 5	TAL	ATL	NA	-	
1999	Petty-Huggins Motorsports	96	Chevy	DAY	ATL	SLM	AND	CLT	MCH	POC	TOL	SBS	BLN	POC	KIL	FRS	FLM	ISF	WIN	DSF	SLM	CLT	TAL; 28	ATL		130th	90	
