= 2003 NASCAR Busch Series =

American motorsport season

The 2003 NASCAR Busch Series began February 15 and ended November 15. Brian Vickers of Hendrick Motorsports won the championship.

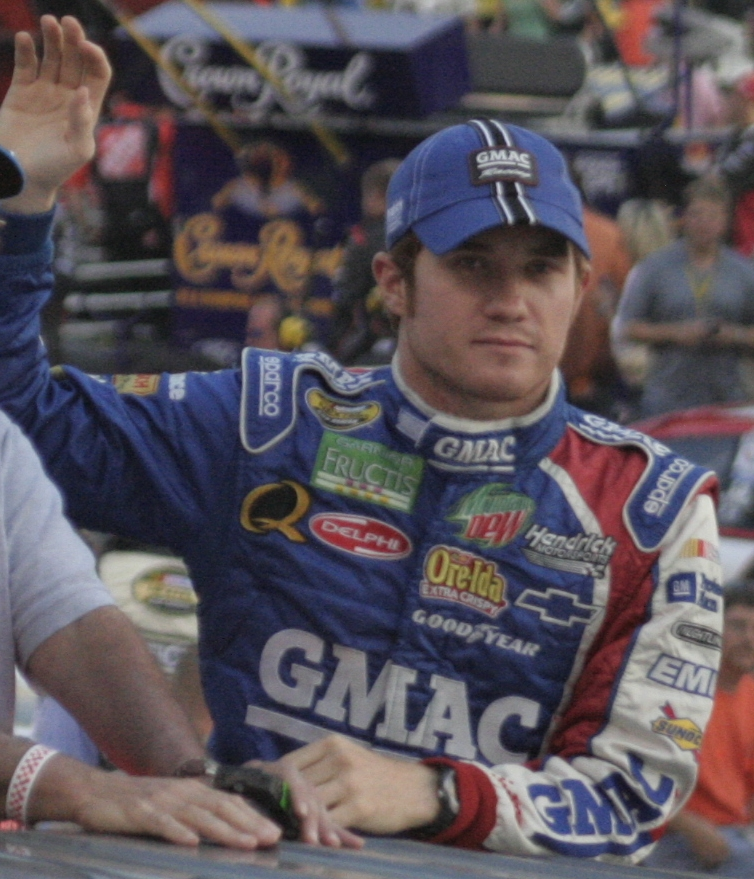
Brian Vickers won the Busch Series championship at the age of 20.

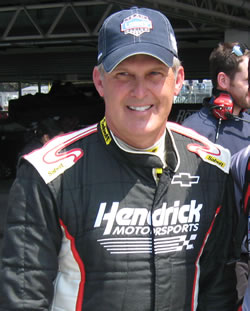
David Green finished second in points.

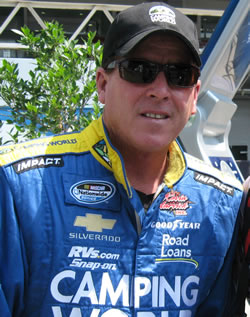
Ron Hornaday Jr. finished third in points.

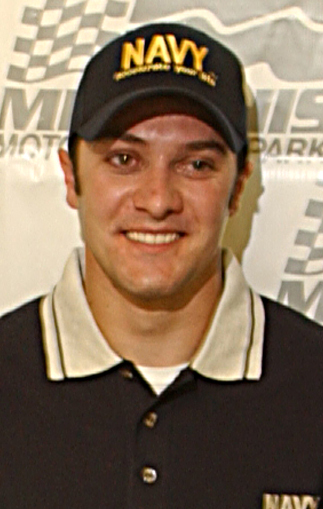
David Stremme the 2003 Busch Series Rookie of the Year.

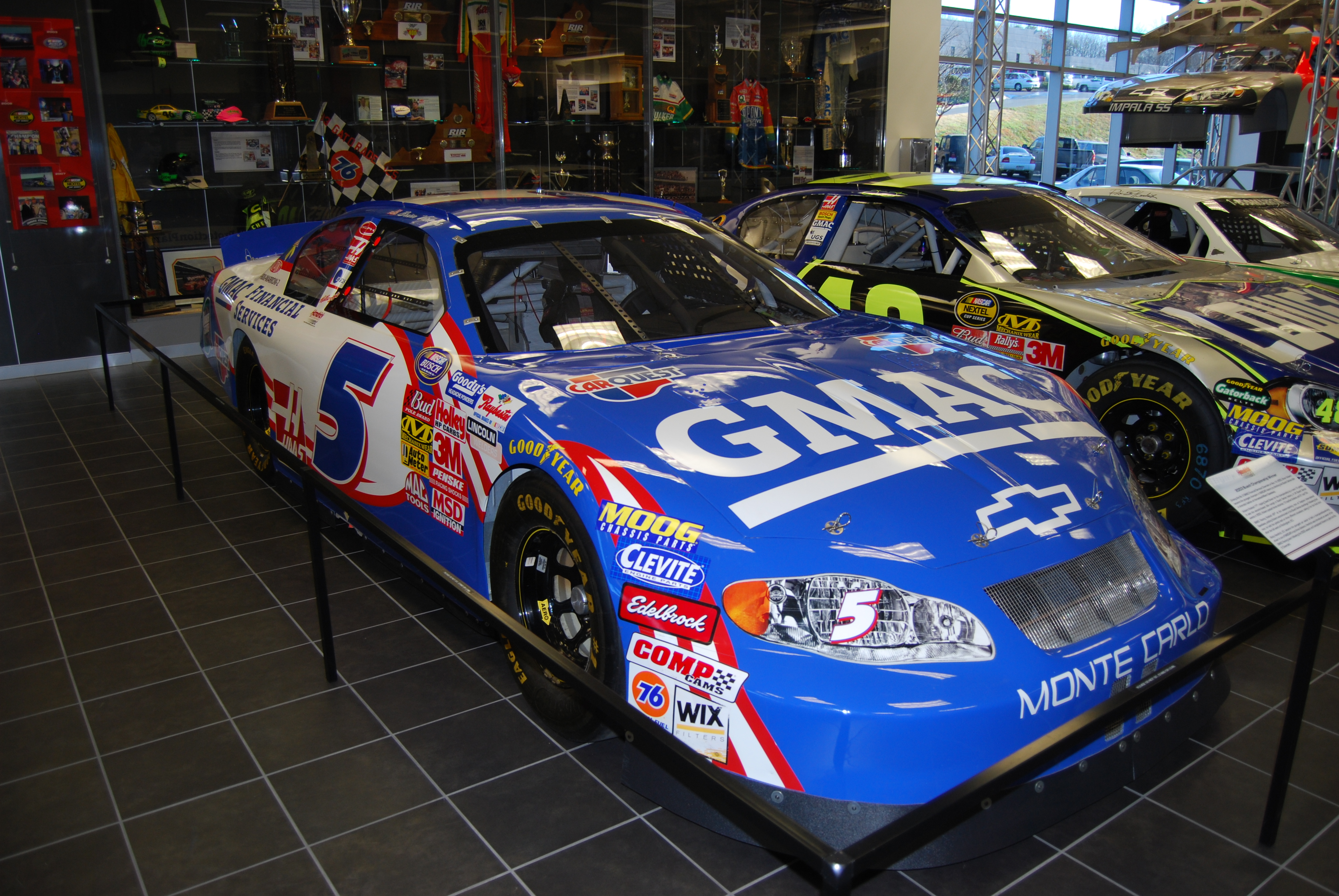
Chevrolet won the manufacturer's championship after not winning for a year.

== 2003 teams and drivers ==
=== Full schedule ===
Manufacturer	Team	No.	Driver
Chevrolet	Bill Davis Racing	23	Scott Wimmer
Chevrolet	FitzBradshaw Racing	12	Kerry Earnhardt 19
Chevrolet	FitzBradshaw Racing	12	Tim Fedewa 15
Chevrolet	GIC-Mixon Motorsports	44	Mike Harmon
Chevrolet	Hendrick Motorsports	5	Brian Vickers
Chevrolet	Lewis Motorsports	46	Ashton Lewis Jr.
Chevrolet	Richard Childress Racing	2	Ron Hornaday Jr.
Chevrolet	Richard Childress Racing	21	Kevin Harvick 18
Chevrolet	Richard Childress Racing	21	Johnny Sauter 16
Chevrolet	ST Motorsports	59	Stacy Compton
Dodge	Carroll Racing	26	Kevin Grubb 23
Dodge	Carroll Racing	26	Lance Norick 4
Dodge	Carroll Racing	26	Chad Blount (R) 7
Ford	Akins Motorsports	38	Kasey Kahne
Ford	Moy Racing (Note: Entries were fielded in a collaboration with Means Racing.)	77	Donnie Neuenberger 4
Ford	Moy Racing	77	Brad Teague 16
Ford	Moy Racing	77	Bruce Bechtel 3
Ford	Moy Racing	77	Dana White 5
Ford	Moy Racing	77	Jimmy Kitchens 1
Ford	Moy Racing	77	Jason Rudd 1
Ford	Moy Racing	77	Ryck Sanders 1
Ford	Moy Racing	77	Derek Hayes 3
Ford	ppc Racing	10	Scott Riggs
Ford	ppc Racing	57	Jason Keller
Ford	Team Rensi Motorsports	25	Bobby Hamilton Jr.
Pontiac	Brewco Motorsports	37	David Green
Chevrolet Pontiac	Brewco Motorsports	27	Chase Montgomery (R) 14
Chevrolet Pontiac	Brewco Motorsports	27	Hank Parker Jr. 2
Chevrolet Pontiac	Brewco Motorsports	27	Joey Clanton (R) 18
Chevrolet Pontiac	Day Enterprises Racing	16	Larry Gunselman
Chevrolet Pontiac	Evans Motorsports	7	Randy LaJoie 17
Chevrolet Pontiac	Evans Motorsports	7	Greg Biffle 13
Chevrolet Pontiac	Evans Motorsports	7	Todd Bodine 1
Chevrolet Pontiac	Evans Motorsports	7	Joe Nemechek 1
Chevrolet Pontiac	Evans Motorsports	7	Hank Parker Jr. 1
Chevrolet Pontiac	Evans Motorsports	7	Mike Skinner 1
Chevrolet Pontiac	Innovative Motorsports	48	Shane Hmiel 26
Chevrolet Pontiac	Innovative Motorsports	48	Jeff Green 2
Chevrolet Pontiac	Innovative Motorsports	48	Todd Bodine 3
Chevrolet Pontiac	Innovative Motorsports	48	Randy LaJoie 1
Chevrolet Pontiac	Innovative Motorsports	48	Kerry Earnhardt 1
Chevrolet Pontiac	Innovative Motorsports	48	Carlos Contreras 1
Chevrolet Pontiac	Joe Gibbs Racing	18	Coy Gibbs (R)
Chevrolet Pontiac	Joe Gibbs Racing	20	Mike Bliss
Dodge Chevrolet	Phoenix Racing	1	Jamie McMurray 18
Dodge Chevrolet	Phoenix Racing	1	David Stremme (R) 16
Ford Pontiac	Jay Robinson Racing	49	Derrike Cope 6
Ford Pontiac	Jay Robinson Racing	49	Chris Bingham (R) 8
Ford Pontiac	Jay Robinson Racing	49	Carlos Contreras 1
Ford Pontiac	Jay Robinson Racing	49	Jason White (R) 2
Ford Pontiac	Jay Robinson Racing	49	Shane Hall 2
Ford Pontiac	Jay Robinson Racing	49	Tammy Jo Kirk 15

=== Limited schedule ===
Manufacturer	Team	No.	Driver	Rounds
Chevrolet	Andy Petree Racing	55	Paul Menard	7
Chevrolet	BACE Motorsports	33	Tony Raines	12
Chevrolet	BACE Motorsports	33	Damon Lusk (R)	1
Chevrolet	BACE Motorsports	74	Kerry Earnhardt	1
Chevrolet	Bennett Motorsports	02	Lowell Bennett	2
Chevrolet	Bost Motorsports	22	Jeff Fuller	1
Chevrolet	Bost Motorsports	22	Regan Smith (R)	16
Chevrolet	Bost Motorsports	22	Tina Gordon	1
Chevrolet	Bost Motorsports	22	Wayne Edwards	1
Chevrolet	Bost Motorsports	22	Brian Tyler	1
Chevrolet	Bost Motorsports	22	Stan Boyd (Note: Stan Boyd qualified the No. 22 car at Michigan (race #23) but he was replaced in the race by Justin Ashburn who failed to qualify his No. 61 car.)	1
Chevrolet	Bost Motorsports	22	Justin Ashburn	1
Chevrolet	Bost Motorsports	22	Dana White	2
Chevrolet	Bost Motorsports	22	Phil Bonifield	1
Chevrolet	Bost Motorsports	22	Bill Hoff	1
Chevrolet	Bost Motorsports	22	Blake Mallory	1
Chevrolet	Bost Motorsports	22	Jeff Streeter	1
Chevrolet	Bost Motorsports	22	Jerry Reary	3
Chevrolet	Bost Motorsports	22	Kevin Conway	1
Chevrolet	Brian Weber Racing	84	Joe Buford	1
Chevrolet	Brian Weber Racing	84	Brian Weber	7
Chevrolet	Brian Weber Racing	84	Gus Wasson	1
Chevrolet	Brian Weber Racing	84	Greg Pursley	1
Chevrolet	Norm Benning Racing	84	Norm Benning	3
Chevrolet	Norm Benning Racing	81	Norm Benning	1
Chevrolet	Norm Benning Racing	8	Norm Benning	2
Chevrolet	Chance 2 Motorsports	8	Dale Earnhardt Jr.	3
Chevrolet	Chance 2 Motorsports	8	Steve Park	1
Chevrolet	Chance 2 Motorsports	8	Hank Parker Jr.	3
Chevrolet	Chance 2 Motorsports	8	Tony Stewart	1
Chevrolet	Chance 2 Motorsports	8	Martin Truex Jr.	3
Chevrolet	Chance 2 Motorsports	81	Martin Truex Jr.	4
Chevrolet	Leik Motorsports	81	Dwayne Leik	4
Chevrolet	Competitive Edge Motorsports	32	Mike Garvey	1
Chevrolet	Team Amick	32	Lyndon Amick	1
Chevrolet	Team Amick	32	Jeff Green	1
Chevrolet	Craig Motorsports	86	Jeff Fultz	4
Chevrolet	DLP Racing	07	Steve Grissom	1
Chevrolet	Mike Bales	07	Brett Oakley	3
Chevrolet	Davis Motorsports	07	Brad Teague	1
Chevrolet	Davis Motorsports	0	Morgan Shepherd	9
Chevrolet	Davis Motorsports	0	Jason White (R)	15
Chevrolet	Davis Motorsports	0	J. R. Robbs	3
Chevrolet	Davis Motorsports	0	Dude Teate	1
Chevrolet	Davis Motorsports	0	Jay Sommers	1
Chevrolet	Davis Motorsports	0	Gus Wasson	4
Chevrolet	Davis Motorsports	70	Brian Conz	1
Chevrolet	Davis Motorsports	70	Morgan Shepherd	4
Chevrolet	Davis Motorsports	70	Don Satterfield	1
Chevrolet	Davis Motorsports	70	Mike Potter	1
Chevrolet	Davis Motorsports	70	Gus Wasson	3
Chevrolet	Davis Motorsports	70	Jason Rudd	1
Chevrolet	Davis Motorsports	70	Jason White (R)	2
Chevrolet	Ken Alexander Racing	70	Jason White (R)	1
Chevrolet	Ken Alexander Racing	70	Robby Benton	3
Chevrolet	Ken Alexander Racing	70	Jimmy Kitchens	1
Chevrolet	DCT Motorsports	36	Steve Grissom	2
Chevrolet	FitzBradshaw Racing	14	Casey Atwood	12
Chevrolet	FitzBradshaw Racing	82	Casey Atwood	3
Chevrolet	FitzBradshaw Racing	82	Jimmy Spencer	1
Chevrolet	FitzBradshaw Racing	82	Randy LaJoie	1
Chevrolet	Frank Cicci Racing	34	Mike McLaughlin	6
Chevrolet	GIC-Mixon Motorsports	41	Jimmy Kitchens	1
Chevrolet	Haas CNC Racing	00	Troy Cline	3
Chevrolet	Haas CNC Racing	00	Jason Leffler	6
Chevrolet	Henderson Motorsports	75	Jay Sauter	11
Chevrolet	Hendrick Motorsports	87	Kyle Busch	7
Chevrolet	Herzog-Jackson Motorsports	92	Todd Bodine	18
Chevrolet	Herzog-Jackson Motorsports	92	Jeff Green	2
Chevrolet	Holman Motorsports	78	Caleb Holman	5
Chevrolet	Innovative Motorsports	47	Regan Smith (R)	1
Chevrolet	Michael Waltrip Racing	99	Michael Waltrip	20
Chevrolet	Michael Waltrip Racing	99	Kenny Wallace	1
Chevrolet	NEMCO Motorsports	99	Joe Nemechek	1
Chevrolet	Morgan–McClure Motorsports	05	Eric McClure	1
Chevrolet	PBM Racing	65	Vern Slagh	1
Chevrolet	PF2 Motorsports	94	Joe Buford	1
Chevrolet	PF2 Motorsports	94	A. J. Alsup	1
Chevrolet	PF2 Motorsports	94	Jerry Robertson	1
Chevrolet	PF2 Motorsports	94	Jamie Aube	1
Chevrolet	PF2 Motorsports	94	Daniel Johnson	1
Chevrolet	PF2 Motorsports	94	Kenny Hendrick	3
Chevrolet	PF2 Motorsports	94	Brian Tyler	1
Chevrolet	PF2 Motorsports	94	Rich Bickle	2
Chevrolet	Premier Motorsports	85	John Hayden	17
Chevrolet	Lackley Motorsports	85	Robby Benton	1
Chevrolet	RB1 Motorsports	71	Ron Young	14
Chevrolet	RB1 Motorsports	71	Shane Wallace	1
Chevrolet	Kenneth Appling Racing	71	Jeremy Clements	1
Chevrolet	Kenneth Appling Racing	51	Jeremy Clements	1
Chevrolet	Ware Racing Enterprises	51	Stan Boyd	2
Chevrolet	Richard Childress Racing	29	Mardy Lindley	1
Chevrolet	Richard Childress Racing	29	Kevin Harvick	1
Chevrolet	Richard Childress Racing	29	Michael Lewis	1
Chevrolet	Richard Childress Racing	29	Johnny Sauter	1
Chevrolet	Smith Brothers Motorsports	67	C. W. Smith	1
Chevrolet	Streeter Racing	83	Jeff Streeter	9
Chevrolet	TC Motorsports	35	Wayne Anderson	2
Chevrolet	Team Bristol Motorsports	54	Hermie Sadler	10
Chevrolet	Truex Motorsports	58	Martin Truex Jr.	3
Chevrolet	White Knight Motorsports	28	Drew White	1
Dodge	Braun Racing	19	Chad Blount (R)	11
Dodge	Braun Racing	19	Casey Mears	14
Dodge	Braun Racing	30	Jimmy Vasser	2
Dodge	Braun Racing	30	Steadman Marlin	8
Dodge	Braun Racing	30	Lance Norick	2
Dodge	Braun Racing	30	Billy Boat	1
Dodge	Braun Racing	30	David Stremme (R)	2
Dodge	Braun Racing	40	Jamie McMurray	1
Dodge	Carroll Racing	90	Lance Norick	2
Dodge	Carroll Racing	90	Kevin Grubb	1
Dodge	Creech Motorsports	13	Carl Long	2
Dodge	Creech Motorsports	13	Franklin Butler III	1
Dodge	Cunningham Motorsports	06	Justin Labonte	1
Dodge	Evernham Motorsports	79	Jeremy Mayfield	1
Dodge	Jason Rudd Motorsports	01	Jason Rudd	3
Dodge	Team Jesel	66	Chad Blount (R)	1
Dodge	Tommy Baldwin Racing	6	Damon Lusk (R)	10
Dodge	Tommy Baldwin Racing	6	Jimmy Spencer	1
Dodge	Tommy Baldwin Racing	6	Ted Musgrave	1
Dodge	Tommy Baldwin Racing	6	Paul Wolfe	2
Dodge	Windward Racing Enterprises	08	Scott Lynch	1
Ford	Akins Motorsports	98	Mark Green	1
Ford	Glidden Motorsports	04	Dion Ciccarelli	3
Ford	Glidden Motorsports	84	Dion Ciccarelli	6
Ford	Havill-Spoerl Racing	73	Jason Schuler	30
Ford	Havill-Spoerl Racing	73	Ron Barfield Jr.	2
Ford	Havill-Spoerl Racing	73	Freddy Tame	1
Ford	Lavender Racing	08	Jody Lavender	1
Ford	Long Brothers Racing	8	Joe Buford	1
Ford	Means Racing	52	Brad Teague	12
Ford	Means Racing	52	Mike Potter	12
Ford	Means Racing	52	Wayne Jacks	1
Ford	Means Racing	52	Donnie Neuenberger	2
Ford	Means Racing	52	Ryck Sanders	1
Ford	Means Racing	52	Bruce Bechtel	1
Ford	Jay Robinson Racing	89	Shane Hall	1
Ford	ppc Racing	15	Shane Hall	2
Ford	ppc Racing	15	Jon Wood	1
Ford	PPM Racing	03	Anthony Lazzaro	1
Ford	Reiser Enterprises	17	Matt Kenseth	14
Ford	Reiser Enterprises	17	Jeff Burton	1
Ford	Reiser Enterprises	17	Wally Dallenbach Jr.	1
Ford	Reiser Enterprises	89	Wally Dallenbach Jr.	4
Ford	Victory in Jesus Racing	89	Morgan Shepherd	5
Ford	Victory in Jesus Racing	9	Morgan Shepherd	4
Ford	Roush Racing	9	Jeff Burton	3
Ford	Roush Racing	9	Greg Biffle	1
Ford	Roush Racing	60	Stanton Barrett	15
Ford	Santerre Racing	01	Mike McLaughlin	1
Ford	Sadler Brothers Racing	95	Kevin Ray	1
Ford	Sadler Brothers Racing	95	David Keith	2
Ford	Schuler Racing	67	Josh Richeson	9
Ford	Schuler Racing	67	Brad Mueller	1
Ford	Schuler Racing	67	Jason Schuler	1
Ford	Team Rensi Motorsports	35	Elliott Sadler	1
Ford	Vahsholtz Racing	90	Clint Vahsholtz	2
Pontiac	Gerhart Racing	55	Bobby Gerhart	2
Chevrolet Dodge	Curb Agajanian Motorsports	43	Johnny Sauter	17
Chevrolet Dodge	Curb Agajanian Motorsports	43	Kevin Grubb	1
Chevrolet Dodge	Curb Agajanian Motorsports	43	Shelby Howard	1
Chevrolet Dodge	Brewco Motorsports	43	Justin Hobgood	1
Chevrolet Dodge	Gary Baker Racing	28	Brad Baker	10
Chevrolet Ford	Marsh Racing	31	Dave Blaney	10
Chevrolet Ford	SCORE Motorsports	02	Hermie Sadler	4
Chevrolet Pontiac	Aramendia Motorsports	79	Joe Aramendia	5
Chevrolet Pontiac	Aramendia Motorsports	79	Troy Cline	1
Chevrolet Pontiac	Biagi Brothers Racing	4	Mike Wallace	32
Chevrolet Pontiac	Biagi Brothers Racing	4	Rick Carelli	1
Chevrolet Pontiac	Day Enterprise Racing	81	Mark Day	1
Chevrolet Pontiac	Day Enterprise Racing	6	Justin Ashburn	1
Chevrolet Pontiac	Day Enterprise Racing	60	Justin Ashburn	1
Chevrolet Pontiac	Day Enterprise Racing	61	Justin Ashburn	22
Chevrolet Pontiac	DCT Motorsports	61	Toby Porter	1
Chevrolet Pontiac	DCT Motorsports	61	Steve Grissom	3
Chevrolet Pontiac	Hoff Motorsports	93	Bill Hoff	3
Chevrolet Pontiac	Johnny Henderson	63	Jimmy Henderson	4
Chevrolet Pontiac	MacDonald Motorsports	72	Randy MacDonald	7
Chevrolet Pontiac	MacDonald Motorsports	72	Michael Dokken	1
Chevrolet Pontiac	MacDonald Motorsports	72	Stan Boyd	2
Chevrolet Pontiac	MacDonald Motorsports	72	Jason Hedlesky	1
Chevrolet Pontiac	Mac Hill Motorsports	56	Tim Sauter	12
Chevrolet Pontiac	Mac Hill Motorsports	56	Jeff Spraker	1
Chevrolet Pontiac	Mac Hill Motorsports	56	Regan Smith (R)	1
Chevrolet Pontiac	Markle Motorsports	68	Rick Markle	7
Chevrolet Pontiac	Montgomery Motorsports (Note: Entries were fielded in a collaboration with Brewco Motorsports.)	80	Chase Montgomery (R)	1
Chevrolet Pontiac	Montgomery Motorsports	80	Justin Hobgood	1
Chevrolet Pontiac	Montgomery Motorsports	80	Mark Green	1
Chevrolet Pontiac	NEMCO Motorsports	87	Jeff Green	1
Chevrolet Pontiac	NEMCO Motorsports	87	Joe Nemechek	12
Chevrolet Pontiac	NEMCO Motorsports	87	David Reutimann	5
Chevrolet Pontiac	NEMCO Motorsports	87	Jeff Fuller	3
Chevrolet Pontiac	NEMCO Motorsports	88	Jeff Fuller	3
Chevrolet Pontiac	NEMCO Motorsports	88	David Reutimann	2
Chevrolet Pontiac	NEMCO Motorsports	88	Joe Nemechek	2
Chevrolet Pontiac	Ortec Racing	96	Brad Baker	1
Chevrolet Pontiac	Ortec Racing	96	Gus Wasson	5
Chevrolet Pontiac	Ortec Racing	96	Kenny Hendrick	1
Chevrolet Pontiac	Ortec Racing	96	Tim Edwards	1
Chevrolet Pontiac	Ortec Racing	96	Josh Richeson	1
Chevrolet Pontiac	Ortec Racing	96	Brent Moore	2
Chevrolet Pontiac	Ortec Racing	96	Mark Green	2
Chevrolet Pontiac	Ortec Racing	96	Brad Loney	2
Chevrolet Pontiac	Stanton Barrett Motorsports	97	Kenny Hendrick	2
Chevrolet Pontiac	Stanton Barrett Motorsports	97	Jimmy Kitchens	5
Chevrolet Pontiac	Stanton Barrett Motorsports	97	Jeff Spraker	1
Chevrolet Pontiac	Stanton Barrett Motorsports	97	Jeff Fuller	6
Chevrolet Pontiac	S.W.A.T. Racing	62	Larry Hollenbeck	3
Chevrolet Pontiac	Tennessee Mountain Boys Racing	53	Joe Buford	2
Chevrolet Pontiac	Tennessee Mountain Boys Racing	53	Brad Teague	2
Chevrolet Pontiac	Tennessee Mountain Boys Racing	53	Gene Allbert Jr.	1
Chevrolet Pontiac	Tennessee Mountain Boys Racing	53	Butch Jarvis	2
Ford Dodge	Jay Robinson Racing	39	Mike McLaughlin	1
Ford Dodge	Jay Robinson Racing	39	Joe Buford	1
Ford Dodge	Jay Robinson Racing	39	Clint Vahsholtz	2
Ford Dodge	Jay Robinson Racing	39	Jason White (R)	4
Ford Dodge	Jay Robinson Racing	39	Shane Hall	1
Ford Dodge	Jay Robinson Racing	39	Chris Bingham (R)	3
Ford Dodge	Jay Robinson Racing	39	Brad Baker	1
Ford Dodge	Jay Robinson Racing	39	Jamie Mosley	11
Ford Dodge	Jay Robinson Racing	39	Blake Mallory	3
Ford Dodge	Jay Robinson Racing	39	Dan Pardus	1
Ford Dodge	Jay Robinson Racing	39	Derrike Cope	1
Ford Dodge	Jay Robinson Racing	39	Jerry Reary	1
Ford Dodge	Jay Robinson Racing	39	Dana White	1
Ford Dodge	Jay Robinson Racing	39	Mark Green	1
Chevrolet Ford Pontiac	Stanton Barrett Racing	91	Ron Barfield Jr.	6
Chevrolet Ford Pontiac	Stanton Barrett Racing	91	Eddy McKean	1
Chevrolet Ford Pontiac	Stanton Barrett Racing	91	Andy Belmont	1
Chevrolet Ford Pontiac	Stanton Barrett Racing	91	Jeff Fuller	2
Chevrolet Ford Pontiac	Stanton Barrett Racing	91	Jason Hedlesky	2
Chevrolet Ford Pontiac	Stanton Barrett Racing	91	Kenny Hendrick	5
Chevrolet Ford Pontiac	Stanton Barrett Racing	91	Stanton Barrett	8
Chevrolet Ford Pontiac	Stanton Barrett Racing	91	Jimmy Kitchens	3
Chevrolet Ford Pontiac	Stanton Barrett Racing	91	Dan Pardus	1
Chevrolet Ford Pontiac	Stanton Barrett Racing	91	Martin Truex Jr.	1

== Schedule ==
No.	Race title	Track	Date
1	Koolerz 300	Daytona International Speedway, Daytona Beach	February 15
2	Rockingham 200	North Carolina Speedway, Rockingham	February 22
3	Sam's Town 300	Las Vegas Motor Speedway, Las Vegas	March 1
4	darlingtonraceway.com 200	Darlington Raceway, Darlington	March 15
5	Channellock 250	Bristol Motor Speedway, Bristol	March 22
6	O'Reilly 300	Texas Motor Speedway, Fort Worth	March 29
7	Aaron's 312	Talladega Superspeedway, Talladega	April 5
8	Pepsi 300	Nashville Superspeedway, Lebanon	April 12
9	1–800–Pitshop.com 300	California Speedway, Fontana	April 26
10	Hardee's 250	Richmond International Raceway, Richmond	May 2
11	Charter Pipeline 250	Gateway International Raceway, Madison	May 10
12	Goulds Pumps/ITT Industries 200	Nazareth Speedway, Nazareth	May 18
13	Carquest Auto Parts 300	Lowe's Motor Speedway, Concord	May 24
14	MBNA Armed Forces Family 200	Dover International Speedway, Dover	May 31
15	Trace Adkins Chrome 300	Nashville Superspeedway, Lebanon	June 7
16	Meijer 300 presented by Oreo Happy	Kentucky Speedway, Sparta	June 14
17	GNC Live Well 250	The Milwaukee Mile, West Allis	June 29
18	Winn-Dixie 250	Daytona International Speedway, Daytona Beach	July 4
19	Tropicana Twister 300	Chicagoland Speedway, Joliet	July 12
20	New England 200	New Hampshire International Speedway, Loudon	July 19
21	TrimSpa Dream Body 250	Pikes Peak International Raceway, Fountain	July 26
22	Kroger 200	Indianapolis Raceway Park, Brownsburg	August 2
23	Cabela's 250	Michigan International Speedway, Brooklyn	August 16
24	Food City 250	Bristol Motor Speedway, Bristol	August 22
25	Winn-Dixie 200 presented by PepsiCo	Darlington Raceway, Darlington	August 30
26	Funai 250	Richmond International Raceway, Richmond	September 5
27	Stacker 200 presented by YJ Stinger	Dover International Speedway, Dover	September 20
28	Mr. Goodcents 300	Kansas Speedway, Kansas City	October 4
29	Little Trees 300	Lowe's Motor Speedway, Concord	October 10
30	Sam's Town 250	Memphis International Raceway, Millington	October 18
31	Aaron's 312	Atlanta Motor Speedway, Hampton	October 25
32	Bashas' Supermarkets 200	Phoenix International Raceway, Phoenix	November 1
33	Target House 200	North Carolina Speedway, Rockingham	November 8
34	Ford 300	Homestead-Miami Speedway, Homestead	November 15

== Races ==
=== Koolerz 300 ===
The Koolerz 300 was held on February 15 at Daytona International Speedway. Joe Nemechek won the pole but was unable to race due to suffering from the flu. Jeff Green started Nemechek's car from the rear of the field.

Top ten results

1. #8 - Dale Earnhardt Jr.
2. #17 - Matt Kenseth
3. #21 - Kevin Harvick
4. #4 - Mike Wallace
5. #1 - Jamie McMurray
6. #92 - Todd Bodine
7. #25 - Bobby Hamilton Jr.
8. #38 - Kasey Kahne
9. #43 - Johnny Sauter
10. #27 - Chase Montgomery

Failed to qualify: Mark Day (#81), Jay Sauter (#75), C. W. Smith (#67), Joe Buford (#84), Brad Teague (#52), Larry Hollenbeck (#82)-Withdrew, Ron Barfield (#91)-Withdrew

- Open-wheel veteran Jimmy Vasser made his NASCAR debut in this race, starting 5th and finishing 28th after crashing out late. Vasser would make one more start at Milwaukee in June.

=== Rockingham 200 ===
The Rockingham 200 was scheduled for February 22, but rain pushed it back to Monday February 24 at North Carolina Speedway. David Green won the pole.

Top ten results

1. #1 - Jamie McMurray
2. #37 - David Green
3. #92 - Todd Bodine
4. #7 - Randy LaJoie
5. #57 - Jason Keller
6. #20 - Mike Bliss
7. #26 - Kevin Grubb
8. #5 - Brian Vickers
9. #43 - Johnny Sauter
10. #21 - Kevin Harvick

Failed to qualify: Justin Ashburn (#61), Michael Dokken (#72), Jeff Fultz (#86)

=== Sam's Town 300 ===
The Sam's Town 300 was held on March 1 at Las Vegas Motor Speedway. Stanton Barrett won the pole.

Top ten results

1. #87 - Joe Nemechek
2. #21 - Kevin Harvick
3. #20 - Mike Bliss
4. #8 - Steve Park
5. #57 - Jason Keller
6. #37 - David Green
7. #99 - Michael Waltrip
8. #60 - Stanton Barrett
9. #2 - Ron Hornaday Jr.
10. #23 - Scott Wimmer

Failed to qualify: Steadman Marlin (#30), Wayne Jacks (#52), Morgan Shepherd (#0), Mike McLaughlin (#01), Troy Cline (#00), Scott Lynch (#08)

=== darlingtonraceway.com 200 ===
The darlingtonraceway.com 200 was scheduled for March 15 but instead held on Monday March 17 at Darlington Raceway due to rain. Stanton Barrett won the pole as the field was set by 2002 Busch Series owner points due to said rain.

Top ten results

1. #92 - Todd Bodine*
2. #1 - Jamie McMurray*
3. #10 - Scott Riggs
4. #59 - Stacy Compton
5. #21 - Johnny Sauter
6. #27 - Hank Parker Jr.
7. #5 - Brian Vickers
8. #38 - Kasey Kahne
9. #2 - Ron Hornaday Jr.
10. #57 - Jason Keller

Failed to qualify: none

- This was Bodine's last career Busch Series victory.
- This race is known for the intense final lap battle between Jamie McMurray and Todd Bodine. On the last turn of the last lap, the two banged fenders and McMurray was spun as Bodine took the checkers. This happened one day after Ricky Craven beat Kurt Busch in the closest Cup Series finish at the time.

=== Channellock 250 ===
The Channellock 250 was held on March 22 at Bristol Motor Speedway. David Green won the pole.

Top ten results

1. #21 - Kevin Harvick
2. #33 - Tony Raines
3. #57 - Jason Keller
4. #37 - David Green
5. #20 - Mike Bliss
6. #25 - Bobby Hamilton Jr.
7. #48 - Shane Hmiel
8. #7 - Randy LaJoie
9. #92 - Todd Bodine
10. #43 - Johnny Sauter

Failed to qualify: none

=== O'Reilly 300 ===
The O'Reilly 300 was held on March 29 at Texas Motor Speedway. Jason Keller won the pole.

Top ten results

1. #87 - Joe Nemechek
2. #10 - Scott Riggs
3. #48 - Shane Hmiel
4. #19 - Chad Blount*
5. #82 - Jimmy Spencer
6. #17 - Matt Kenseth
7. #23 - Scott Wimmer
8. #38 - Kasey Kahne
9. #18 - Coy Gibbs

Failed to qualify: Robby Benton (#85), Troy Cline (#00)

- Chad Blount received a 25–point penalty for illegal modifications to his car's rear hubs found after the race.

=== Aaron's 312 (Talladega) ===
The Aaron's 312 was held on April 5 at Talladega Superspeedway. Joe Nemechek won the pole.

Top ten results

1. #8 - Dale Earnhardt Jr.*
2. #87 - Joe Nemechek
3. #48 - Shane Hmiel
4. #2 - Ron Hornaday Jr.
5. #20 - Mike Bliss
6. #1 - Jamie McMurray
7. #99 - Michael Waltrip
8. #4 - Mike Wallace
9. #18 - Coy Gibbs
10. #22 - Tina Gordon

Failed to qualify: Bobby Gerhart (#55), Kevin Ray (#95), Gus Wasson (#84)

- Lyndon Amick made his last career start in this race. Amick was involved in an 18-car pileup on lap 8, and finished 36th.
- Dale Earnhardt Jr. was running dangerously low on fuel when a race-ending caution came out with 3 laps to go. Miraculously, Earnhardt's car ran just long enough to win the race, running out of fuel on the cooldown lap, and needing to be pushed back to victory lane.

=== Pepsi 300 ===
The Pepsi 300 was held on April 12 at Nashville Superspeedway. Randy LaJoie won the pole.

Top ten results

1. #37 - David Green
2. #21 - Johnny Sauter
3. #46 - Ashton Lewis
4. #20 - Mike Bliss
5. #87 - David Reutimann
6. #60 - Stanton Barrett
7. #1 - David Stremme
8. #19 - Chad Blount
9. #5 - Brian Vickers
10. #25 - Bobby Hamilton Jr.

Failed to qualify: John Hayden (#85), Jeff Streeter (#83), Gus Wasson (#96), Joe Buford (#8), Dion Ciccarelli (#04), Norm Benning (#84)

- Mike McLaughlin qualified the #92 for Todd Bodine, as Bodine was in Martinsville for the Cup race.

=== 1–800–Pitshop.com 300 ===
The 1–800–Pitshop.com 300 was held on April 26 at California Speedway. Kevin Harvick won the pole.

Top ten results

1. #17 - Matt Kenseth
2. #99 - Michael Waltrip
3. #21 - Kevin Harvick
4. #38 - Kasey Kahne
5. #92 - Todd Bodine
6. #1 - Jamie McMurray
7. #57 - Jason Keller
8. #48 - Shane Hmiel
9. #37 - David Green

Failed to qualify: Jason Hedlesky (#91), Brad Teague (#52), Greg Pursley (#84)

=== Hardee's 250 ===
The Hardee's 250 was held on May 2 at Richmond International Raceway. Michael Waltrip won the pole.

Top ten results

1. #21 - Kevin Harvick
2. #10 - Scott Riggs
3. #33 - Tony Raines
4. #99 - Michael Waltrip
5. #23 - Scott Wimmer
6. #43 - Johnny Sauter
7. #59 - Stacy Compton
8. #48 - Shane Hmiel
9. #37 - David Green
10. #25 - Bobby Hamilton Jr.

Failed to qualify: Brad Baker (#28), Kenny Hendrick (#91), Justin Ashburn (#61), Dion Ciccarelli (#84), Randy MacDonald (#72), Jason Rudd (#01)

=== Charter Pipeline 250 ===
The Charter Pipeline 250 was held on May 10 at Gateway International Raceway. Ashton Lewis won the pole.

Top ten results

1. #10 - Scott Riggs
2. #37 - David Green
3. #57 - Jason Keller
4. #5 - Brian Vickers
5. #25 - Bobby Hamilton Jr.
6. #59 - Stacy Compton
7. #21 - Johnny Sauter
8. #23 - Scott Wimmer
9. #60 - Stanton Barrett
10. #99 - Kenny Wallace

Failed to qualify: Joe Buford (#94) - Withdrew

=== Goulds Pumps/ITT Industries 200 ===
The Goulds Pumps/ITT Industries 200 was held on May 18 at Nazareth Speedway. Randy LaJoie won the pole.

Top ten results

1. #2 - Ron Hornaday Jr.
2. #5 - Brian Vickers
3. #20 - Mike Bliss
4. #37 - David Green
5. #92 - Todd Bodine
6. #1 - David Stremme
7. #7 - Randy LaJoie
8. #59 - Stacy Compton
9. #25 - Bobby Hamilton Jr.
10. #21 - Johnny Sauter

Failed to qualify: Brian Conz (#70)

- Mike McLaughlin qualified the #92 for Todd Bodine and Tim Fedewa qualified the #4 for Mike Wallace, as Bodine and Wallace were in Charlotte for The Winston.

=== Carquest Auto Parts 300 ===
The Carquest Auto Parts 300 was held on May 24 at Lowe's Motor Speedway. Kevin Harvick won the pole.

Top ten results

1. #17 - Matt Kenseth
2. #87 - Kyle Busch*
3. #10 - Scott Riggs
4. #92 - Todd Bodine
5. #20 - Mike Bliss
6. #38 - Kasey Kahne
7. #8 - Hank Parker Jr.
8. #46 - Ashton Lewis
9. #21 - Kevin Harvick
10. #99 - Michael Waltrip

Failed to qualify: Morgan Shepherd (#0), Lance Norick (#90), Casey Atwood (#82), Brad Baker (#39), Kenny Hendrick (#91), Jason Schuler (#73)

- Joe Nemechek qualified the #88 for Jeff Fuller.
- Kyle Busch made his Busch series debut in this race, and surprised many by finishing 2nd to race winner Matt Kenseth.

=== MBNA Armed Forces Family 200 ===
The MBNA Armed Forces Family 200 was held on May 31 at Dover International Speedway. Joe Nemechek won the pole.

Top ten results

1. #87 - Joe Nemechek
2. #10 - Scott Riggs
3. #37 - David Green
4. #17 - Matt Kenseth
5. #5 - Brian Vickers
6. #25 - Bobby Hamilton Jr.
7. #92 - Todd Bodine
8. #38 - Kasey Kahne
9. #20 - Mike Bliss
10. #2 - Ron Hornaday Jr.

Failed to qualify: Gus Wasson (#96), Brian Weber (#84)

=== Trace Adkins Chrome 300 ===
The Trace Adkins Chrome 300 was held on June 7 at Nashville Superspeedway. Johnny Sauter won the pole.

Top ten results

1. #10 - Scott Riggs*
2. #37 - David Green
3. #1 - David Stremme
4. #7 - Randy LaJoie
5. #25 - Bobby Hamilton Jr.
6. #46 - Ashton Lewis
7. #60 - Stanton Barrett
8. #23 - Scott Wimmer
9. #75 - Jay Sauter
10. #5 - Brian Vickers

Failed to qualify: Brian Weber (#84)

- Dan Pardus qualified the #39 for Jamie Mosley and David Reutimann qualified the #87 for Jeff Fuller.
- This was Riggs’ final Busch Series victory.

=== Meijer 300 presented by Oreo Happy ===
The Meijer 300 presented by Oreo Happy was held on June 14 at Kentucky Speedway. Stacy Compton won the pole.

Top ten results

1. #25 - Bobby Hamilton Jr.
2. #57 - Jason Keller
3. #2 - Ron Hornaday Jr.
4. #59 - Stacy Compton
5. #5 - Brian Vickers
6. #46 - Ashton Lewis
7. #27 - David Green
8. #14 - Casey Atwood
9. #1 - David Stremme

Failed to qualify: Jason Rudd (#01), Rick Markle (#68), Jamie Mosley (#39), Justin Ashburn (#61), Mike Potter (#52), John Hayden (#85), Stan Boyd (#72)

=== GNC Live Well 250 ===
The GNC Live Well 250 was held on June 29 at The Milwaukee Mile. Johnny Sauter won the pole.

Top ten results

1. #57 - Jason Keller*
2. #5 - Brian Vickers
3. #1 - David Stremme
4. #2 - Ron Hornaday Jr.
5. #87 - David Reutimann
6. #37 - David Green
7. #10 - Scott Riggs
8. #92 - Todd Bodine
9. #59 - Stacy Compton
10. #25 - Bobby Hamilton Jr.

Failed to qualify (rained out): Brad Teague (#52) - Withdrew, Brad Mueller (#67) - Withdrew, Morgan Shepherd (#70) - Withdrew, Kenny Hendrick (#97) - Withdrew

- This was Keller's last career NASCAR victory.

=== Winn-Dixie 250 ===
The Winn-Dixie 250 was held on July 4 at Daytona International Speedway. Dale Earnhardt Jr. won the pole.

Top ten results

1. #8 - Dale Earnhardt Jr.*
2. #99 - Michael Waltrip
3. #1 - Jamie McMurray
4. #2 - Ron Hornaday Jr.
5. #21 - Johnny Sauter
6. #10 - Scott Riggs
7. #5 - Brian Vickers
8. #92 - Todd Bodine*
9. #34 - Mike McLaughlin
10. #48 - Shane Hmiel

Failed to qualify: Jason Schuler (#73), Dan Pardus (#39), Jason Hedlesky (#91), Jimmy Kitchens (#70), Joe Aramendia (#79)

- In addition to winning the pole, Earnhardt Jr. would lead all 100 laps to win his third superspeedway race of the season.
- Earnhardt Jr.'s victory marked a season sweep for Dale Earnhardt Incorporated on superspeedways in the Busch Series. This was also DEI's 5th straight superspeedway victory across NASCAR as a whole.
- Herzog–Jackson Motorsports made its last start as a full-time team in this race, as financial troubles would cause the team to start skipping races, and released driver Todd Bodine. The team would make only two more starts later in the year with Jeff Green driving before shutting down at season's end.

=== Tropicana Twister 300 ===
The Tropicana Twister 300 was held on July 12 at Chicagoland Speedway. Casey Mears won the pole.

Top ten results

1. #25 - Bobby Hamilton Jr.
2. #17 - Matt Kenseth
3. #5 - Brian Vickers
4. #19 - Casey Mears
5. #99 - Michael Waltrip
6. #57 - Jason Keller
7. #10 - Scott Riggs
8. #33 - Tony Raines
9. #1 - Jamie McMurray
10. #20 - Mike Bliss

Failed to qualify: none

- Joe Nemechek qualified the #7 for Todd Bodine and Greg Biffle qualified the #88 for Nemechek.
- Kerry Earnhardt made his last start with FitzBradshaw Racing in this event, finishing 41st after crashing out on lap 2. Tim Fedewa, who served as Earnhardt's spotter, would drive the #12 for the rest of the season.

=== New England 200 ===
The New England 200 was held on July 19 at New Hampshire International Speedway. Kevin Harvick won the pole.

Top ten results

1. #37 - David Green
2. #21 - Kevin Harvick
3. #17 - Matt Kenseth
4. #5 - Brian Vickers
5. #23 - Scott Wimmer
6. #25 - Bobby Hamilton Jr.
7. #57 - Jason Keller
8. #2 - Ron Hornaday Jr.
9. #38 - Kasey Kahne
10. #59 - Stacy Compton

Failed to qualify: none

=== TrimSpa Dream Body 250 ===
The TrimSpa Dream Body 250 was held on July 26 at Pikes Peak International Raceway. Bobby Hamilton Jr. won the pole.

Top ten results

1. #23 - Scott Wimmer
2. #57 - Jason Keller
3. #10 - Scott Riggs
4. #21 - Johnny Sauter
5. #27 - Joey Clanton
6. #59 - Stacy Compton
7. #2 - Ron Hornaday Jr.
8. #26 - Kevin Grubb
9. #46 - Ashton Lewis
10. #38 - Kasey Kahne

Failed to qualify: Drew White (#28)

- Jeremy Clements made his NASCAR debut in this race, qualifying 35th and finishing 31st after crashing out early. Clements wouldn't make another NASCAR start until 2007.

=== Kroger 200 ===
The Kroger 200 was held on August 2 at Indianapolis Raceway Park. Shane Hmiel won the pole.

Top ten results

1. #5 - Brian Vickers
2. #57 - Jason Keller
3. #59 - Stacy Compton
4. #48 - Shane Hmiel
5. #10 - Scott Riggs
6. #37 - David Green
7. #7 - Mike Skinner
8. #2 - Ron Hornaday Jr.
9. #55 - Paul Menard
10. #20 - Mike Bliss

Failed to qualify: Norm Benning (#84), Brett Oakley (#07), Bill Hoff (#93)

=== Cabela's 250 ===
The Cabela's 250 was held on August 16 at Michigan International Speedway. Kasey Kahne won the pole. The race was shortened to 110 laps due to rain.

Top ten results

1. #21 - Kevin Harvick
2. #38 - Kasey Kahne
3. #25 - Bobby Hamilton Jr.
4. #37 - David Green
5. #10 - Scott Riggs
6. #87 - David Reutimann
7. #19 - Casey Mears
8. #99 - Michael Waltrip
9. #48 - Shane Hmiel
10. #31 - Dave Blaney

Failed to qualify: Mike Potter (#52), Justin Ashburn (#61), Rick Markle (#68), Larry Hollenbeck (#62)

- Stan Boyd qualified the #22 but he was replaced in the race by Justin Ashburn who failed to qualify his #61.

=== Food City 250 ===
The Food City 250 was held on August 22 at Bristol Motor Speedway. Jason Keller won the pole.

Top ten results

1. #99 - Michael Waltrip
2. #2 - Ron Hornaday Jr.
3. #6 - Ted Musgrave
4. #48 - Shane Hmiel
5. #21 - Kevin Harvick
6. #81 - Martin Truex Jr.
7. #5 - Brian Vickers
8. #33 - Tony Raines
9. #10 - Scott Riggs
10. #46 - Ashton Lewis

Failed to qualify: Caleb Holman (#78), Justin Ashburn (#60), John Hayden (#85), Jason White (#70), Dion Ciccarelli (#84), Butch Jarvis (#53), Brett Oakley (#07), Norm Benning (#8), Daniel Johnson (#94)

- Stanton Barrett qualified the #91 for Jimmy Kitchens.

=== Winn-Dixie 200 presented by PepsiCo ===
The Winn-Dixie 200 presented by PepsiCo was held on August 30 at Darlington Raceway. Kevin Harvick won the pole.

Top ten results

1. #5 - Brian Vickers
2. #87 - Kyle Busch
3. #99 - Michael Waltrip
4. #25 - Bobby Hamilton Jr.
5. #21 - Kevin Harvick
6. #38 - Kasey Kahne
7. #57 - Jason Keller
8. #59 - Stacy Compton
9. #19 - Casey Mears
10. #14 - Casey Atwood

Failed to qualify: Kenny Hendrick (#94), Jimmy Kitchens (#97), Dan Pardus (#91), Caleb Holman (#78)-Withdrew

=== Funai 250 ===
The Funai 250 was held on September 5 at Richmond International Raceway. Kevin Harvick won the pole.

Top ten results

1. #43 - Johnny Sauter*
2. #21 - Kevin Harvick
3. #25 - Bobby Hamilton Jr.
4. #5 - Brian Vickers
5. #37 - David Green
6. #17 - Matt Kenseth
7. #2 - Ron Hornaday Jr.
8. #33 - Tony Raines
9. #31 - Dave Blaney
10. #48 - Shane Hmiel

Failed to qualify: Dion Ciccarelli (#84), Jimmy Kitchens (#97), Paul Menard (#55), Kenny Hendrick (#94), Franklin Butler III (#13), Morgan Shepherd (#89), Hermie Sadler (#02), Jimmy Henderson (#63)

- This race was marred with controversy involving Shane Hmiel, who was involved in several on track incidents, including one where he divebombed into turn 3 and wrecked Jason Keller and Tim Fedewa. Hmiel would be fined $5,000 and placed on probation. A week later, Hmiel was indefinitely suspended from NASCAR after failing a drug test, testing positive for marijuana.
- On the final lap, Johnny Sauter gave Matt Kenseth the bump and run in turn 3, knocking Kenseth out of the way, and allowing Sauter to score the victory.
- Points leader Scott Riggs had a miserable night, getting caught up in multiple incidents and finishing 17 laps down in 29th. This would cost him the championship lead, and would fall to 3rd in points behind David Green and Brian Vickers.

=== Stacker 200 presented by YJ Stinger ===
The Stacker 200 presented by YJ Stinger was held on September 20 at Dover International Speedway. Kevin Harvick won the pole.

Top ten results

1. #5 - Brian Vickers*
2. #25 - Bobby Hamilton Jr.
3. #10 - Scott Riggs*
4. #38 - Kasey Kahne
5. #20 - Mike Bliss
6. #2 - Ron Hornaday Jr.
7. #46 - Ashton Lewis
8. #57 - Jason Keller
9. #21 - Kevin Harvick
10. #4 - Mike Wallace

Failed to qualify: Kenny Hendrick (#94), Jeff Streeter (#83), Martin Truex Jr. (#81), Jason Rudd (#01), Morgan Shepherd (#89), Jimmy Henderson (#63), Jimmy Kitchens (#41)

- Due to Hurricane Isabel, the qualifying was rained out, consequently Martin Truex Jr. replaced an unknown driver in the #91 in the race, after failed to qualify his #81 and Jason Rudd also replaced an unknown driver in the #70 in the race, after failed to qualify his #01.
- By winning this race, Brian Vickers took the points lead for the first time in 2003.
- On lap 16, Scott Riggs wrecked championship leader David Green, taking him out of contention. Green finished 93 laps down in 31st, falling from 1st to 4th in the points standings behind Vickers, Riggs, and Ron Hornaday Jr..

=== Mr. Goodcents 300 ===
The Mr. Goodcents 300 was held on October 4 at Kansas Speedway. Michael Waltrip won the pole.

Top ten results

1. #37 - David Green*
2. #21 - Kevin Harvick
3. #7 - Greg Biffle
4. #57 - Jason Keller
5. #8 - Hank Parker Jr.
6. #46 - Ashton Lewis
7. #23 - Scott Wimmer
8. #59 - Stacy Compton
9. #87 - Joe Nemechek
10. #1 - Jamie McMurray

Failed to qualify: Morgan Shepherd (#9), Ron Young (#71), Jeff Streeter (#83), John Hayden (#85), Jamie Mosley (#39), Stanton Barrett (#91), Justin Ashburn (#61)

- This would be Pontiac's last Busch Series victory, and its last national series NASCAR victory altogether (its final overall win would come at New Hampshire Motor Speedway in the NASCAR Whelen Modified Tour in 2011, a year after the marquee went defunct).
- Brian Vickers crashed with Jason Leffler on lap 91, making this the third consecutive race with an incident involving the points leader. Vickers finished 52 laps down in 32nd, falling to 3rd in points.
- The top-3 in points (Vickers, Riggs, and Hornaday) all finished outside the top-10, allowing race winner David Green to retake the points lead.

=== Little Trees 300 ===
The Little Trees 300 was held on October 11 after rain postponed it from October 10 at Lowe's Motor Speedway. Kevin Harvick won the pole.

Top ten results

1. #7 - Greg Biffle
2. #99 - Michael Waltrip
3. #20 - Mike Bliss
4. #5 - Brian Vickers
5. #1 - Jamie McMurray
6. #37 - David Green
7. #25 - Bobby Hamilton Jr.
8. #38 - Kasey Kahne
9. #21 - Kevin Harvick
10. #57 - Jason Keller

Failed to qualify: Shane Hall (#15), Jeff Streeter (#22), Wayne Anderson (#35), Justin Ashburn (#61), Mike Harmon (#44), Jamie Mosley (#39), Gus Wasson (#70), Brad Teague (#52)

- Matt Kenseth qualified the #17 for Jeff Burton.

=== Sam's Town 250 ===
The Sam's Town 250 was held on October 18 at Memphis Motorsports Park. David Reutimann qualified the #7 for, and won the pole filling for Greg Biffle.

Top ten results

1. #25 - Bobby Hamilton Jr.*
2. #57 - Jason Keller*
3. #21 - Johnny Sauter
4. #2 - Ron Hornaday Jr.
5. #5 - Brian Vickers
6. #23 - Scott Wimmer
7. #14 - Casey Atwood
8. #20 - Mike Bliss
9. #1 - David Stremme
10. #46 - Ashton Lewis Jr.

Failed to qualify: John Hayden (#85), Justin Ashburn (#61), Brent Moore (#96), Jason Hedlesky (#72), Butch Jarvis (#53), Dana White (#39), Dude Teate (#70).

- This victory, coupled with a late-season surge in performance, slowly brought Bobby Hamilton Jr. into the championship fight, as several races earlier, he was over 300 points back.
- Jason Keller's 2nd-place finish moved him into 3rd in points.
- Championship leader David Green had a terrible day, spending most of the race outside the top-10, eventually dropping a cylinder, and finishing a lap down in 19th, losing the points lead to Vickers.

=== Aaron's 312 (Atlanta) ===
The Aaron's 312 was held on October 25 at Atlanta Motor Speedway. Greg Biffle won the pole.

Top ten results

1. #7 - Greg Biffle
2. #17 - Matt Kenseth
3. #25 - Bobby Hamilton Jr.
4. #99 - Michael Waltrip
5. #8 - Hank Parker Jr.
6. #10 - Scott Riggs
7. #38 - Kasey Kahne
8. #37 - David Green*
9. #21 - Kevin Harvick
10. #31 - Dave Blaney

Failed to qualify: John Hayden (#85), Jimmy Henderson (#63), Wayne Anderson (#35), Justin Ashburn (#61), Dwayne Leik (#81), Jeff Fuller (#91), Jeremy Clements (#51)

- In another case of points leader troubles, Brian Vickers had several issues, including spinning out on lap 48. Vickers finished 14 laps down in 31st, dropping him to 5th in the standings.
- David Green would retake the points lead after this race.

=== Bashas' Supermarkets 200 ===
The Bashas' Supermarkets 200 was held on November 1 at Phoenix International Raceway. Kevin Harvick won the pole. The race was shortened to 181 laps due to rain.

Top ten results

1. #25 - Bobby Hamilton Jr.*
2. #21 - Kevin Harvick
3. #5 - Brian Vickers
4. #87 - Joe Nemechek
5. #10 - Scott Riggs*
6. #23 - Scott Wimmer
7. #14 - Casey Atwood
8. #43 - Johnny Sauter
9. #7 - Greg Biffle

Failed to qualify: Stan Boyd (#51), Blake Mallory (#39), Josh Richeson (#67), Jeff Fuller (#97), Randy MacDonald (#72), John Hayden (#85), Freddy Tame (#73), Jeff Streeter (#83), Clint Vahsholtz (#90)

- This would be Hamilton's 5th and final Busch Series victory as well as his fourth of the season.
- Hamilton's victory, along with point leader David Green's 17th-place finish, tightened up the championship fight. With two races to go, six drivers were still in contention for the Busch Series crown, while 7th place Scott Wimmer was 502 points out of the lead, and therefore mathematically ineligible.
- Green's struggles dropped him to 4th in the standings, allowing Scott Riggs to lead the points for the first time since Darlington in August.

=== Target House 200 ===
The Target House 200 was held on November 8 at North Carolina Speedway. Brian Vickers won the pole.

Top ten results

1. #1 - Jamie McMurray
2. #8 - Martin Truex Jr.
3. #25 - Bobby Hamilton Jr.*
4. #79 - Jeremy Mayfield
5. #30 - David Stremme
6. #5 - Brian Vickers*
7. #87 - Kyle Busch
8. #23 - Scott Wimmer
9. #43 - Johnny Sauter
10. #37 - David Green

Failed to qualify: Josh Richeson (#67), Morgan Shepherd (#89), Rich Bickle (#94), Brad Teague (#52), Jason Schuler (#73), Justin Ashburn (#61), Caleb Holman (#78), Dion Ciccarelli (#84), Norm Benning (#81), Jerry Reary (#22), Justin Hobgood (#80)

- More misfortune would befall the points leader, as Scott Riggs would crash out on lap 167 and finish 38th, dropping him to 5th in the standings.
- At the beginning of September, Bobby Hamilton Jr. was out of contention for the championship, being over 300 points behind. With one race left in the season, he was now less than 90 points behind, and a clear favorite to win it.
- Brian Vickers' 6th-place finish, coupled with Riggs' DNF, gave him the points lead by 22 points over David Green going into the season finale. Disregarding what any of his title challengers might do, Vickers would secure the championship if he finishes 3rd or better at Homestead.

Busch Series points standings (after 33 of 34 races)
Pos.	Driver	Points	Difference
1	Brian Vickers	4507	Leader
2	David Green	4485	-22
3	Ron Hornaday Jr.	4468	-39
4	Jason Keller	4437	-70
5	Scott Riggs	4422	-85
6	Bobby Hamilton Jr.	4418	-89

=== Ford 300 ===
The Ford 300 was held on November 15 at Homestead-Miami Speedway. Greg Biffle won the pole.

Top ten results

1. #38 - Kasey Kahne*
2. #8 - Martin Truex Jr.
3. #25 - Bobby Hamilton Jr.
4. #00 - Jason Leffler
5. #46 - Ashton Lewis
6. #21 - Kevin Harvick
7. #20 - Mike Bliss
8. #19 - Casey Mears
9. #37 - David Green
10. #99 - Michael Waltrip

Failed to qualify: Morgan Shepherd (#9), Jason Schuler (#73), Clint Vahsholtz (#39), Justin Ashburn (#61), Mike Harmon (#44), Stan Boyd (#51), Joe Aramendia (#79), Brad Baker (#28)

- This was Kahne's first Busch series victory, and the first for Akins Motorsports since 1999.
- Despite finishing behind David Green, Brian Vickers would win the 2003 Busch Series championship by 14 points over Green. At 20 years old, Vickers became the youngest series champion in history, breaking the record set by the late Rob Moroso by one year.
- Scott Riggs' championship hopes ended on the first lap, when he crashed in Turn 3 after contact with teammate Jon Wood. Riggs' crew would repair the car, but he would only complete 28 laps before ending his day in 41st.
- Two-time series runner-up Jason Keller was never a factor, finishing a lap down in 24th. Ron Hornaday Jr finished 15th, leader Brian Vickers 11th, David Green 9th, and Bobby Hamilton Jr 3rd after leading 41 laps.

== Full Drivers' Championship ==
(key) Bold – Pole position awarded by time. Italics – Pole position set by owner's points. * – Most laps led. ** - All laps led.

Pos	Driver	DAY	CAR	LVS	DAR	BRI	TEX	TAL	NSH	CAL	RCH	GTY	NAZ	CLT	DOV	NSH	KEN	MIL	DAY	CHI	NHA	PPR	IRP	MCH	BRI	DAR	RCH	DOV	KAN	CLT	MEM	ATL	PHO	CAR	HOM	Pts
1	Brian Vickers	42	8	13	7	14	25*	23	9	19	16	4	2	14	5	10	6	2	7	3	4	29	1	19	7	1	4	1*	32	4	5*	31	3	**6**	11	4637
2	David Green	14	**2**	6	31	**4**	29	16	1	9	9	2	4	37	3	2	8	6	20	11	1	12	6	4	17	14	5	31	1	6	19	8	16	10	9	4623
3	Ron Hornaday Jr.	16	12	9	9	12	17	4	16	10	15	28	1*	21	10	16	3	4	4	12	8	7*	8	28	2	11	7	6	14	12	4	13	5	17	15	4591
4	Bobby Hamilton Jr.	7	13	34	12	6	40	35	10*	18	10	5	9	13	6	5	1*	10	22	1*	6	**25**	35	3	34	4	3	2	19	7	1	3	1*	3	3	4588
5	Jason Keller	27	5	5	10	3	**18**	28	27	7	21	3	11	17	11	14	2	1	14	6	7	2	2	23	**11**	7	21	8	4	10	2	15	17	13	24	4528
6	Scott Riggs	31	17	20	3	23	2	24	11	20	2*	1	15	3	2	1*	30	7*	6	7	14	3	5	5	9	17	29	3	13	13	12	6	6	38	41	4462
7	Kasey Kahne	8	26	11	8	13	9	37	29	4	18	31	12	6	8	25	11	16	38	28	9	10	14	**2**	14	6	12	4	30	8	15	7	27	18	1	4104
8	Johnny Sauter	9	9	31	5	10	37	26	2	23	6	7	10	25	21	11	17	13	5	27	25	4	11	22	19	16	1	29	34	21	3	16	9	9	12	4098
9	Scott Wimmer	12	11	10	28	25	8	38	36	14	5	8	13	19	15	8	5	14	16	15	5	1	12	26	32	18	16	14	7	20	6	14	7	8	39	4059
10	Mike Bliss	33	6	3	32	5	22	5	4	17	28	12*	3	5	9	33	31	21	39	10	33	16	10	16	30	12	27	5	31	3	8	21	20	15	7	3932
11	Stacy Compton	38	22	15	4	15	16	32	31	21	7	6	8	18	29	28	**4**	9	19	19	10	6	3	17	29	8	15	12	8	23	11	23	35	16	21	3893
12	Ashton Lewis	25	16	27	25	18	27	20	3	12	30	**33**	35	8	22	6	7	12	12	42	11	9	34	36	10	20	19	7	6	16	10	11	12	12	5	3801
13	Mike Wallace	4	36	18	16	11	30	8	28	16	12	16	17	20	17	24	13	22	13	17			19	27	16	15	17	10	15	19	17	17	18	29	23	3489
14	Coy Gibbs **(R)**	39	14	16	14	27	10	9	30	13	24	36	21	24	25	31	15	24	17	20	19	17	25	37	22	23	20	18	21	26	25	25	28	33	31	3212
15	Shane Hmiel	17	35	12	13	7	3	3	14	8	8	13	19	38	13	34	19	18	10	16	15	14	**4***	9	4	28	10									3160
16	Kevin Harvick	3	10	2*		1*				**3***	1			**9**							2*			1	5*	**5***	2*	9	2	**9**		9	**2**	14	6	3077
17	Todd Bodine	6	3	19	1*	9	4	27	13	5	29	11	5	4	7	26	29	8	8	31									29			18		19		2763
18	Michael Waltrip	34	18	7	36	33	11	7		2	**4***			10*					2	5				8	1	3			**24***	2		4		41	10	2637
19	Kevin Grubb	30	7	17	11	26	13	25	12	22	33	32	31	34	35			35	15	18	29	8	15		13	13		19					15	20		2498
20	Jamie McMurray	5	1*	33	2	17	14	6		6				23					3	9	23			14	12	41			10	5				1*	20*	2478
21	Larry Gunselman	35	33	28	37	28	39	18	34	30	26	22	23	42	32	32	23	34	32	38	20	30	32	38	39	26	23	32	23	33	22	39	32	42	40	2371
22	David Stremme **(R)**								7		14	14	6		31	3	10	3				11	17				13	21		14	9	12	13	5	14	2354
23	Mike Harmon	23	30	43	35	40	23	34	22	39	43	30	28	41	33	38	35	33	25	22	28	22	20	31	23	27	32	33	28	DNQ	36	30	39	37	DNQ	2207
24	Matt Kenseth	2		42			7			1				1	4*					2	3			18	25		6			QL		2*	19		38	1925
25	Stanton Barrett	41	19	8	15	16	19	40	6	34	41	9	20	22	12	7				34		42			QL		38		DNQ	30	42		41	40		1877
26	Randy LaJoie	15	4	32	17	8	34	29	**32**	32	27	35	**7**	28	26	4	38	11													30		14		Wth	1863
27	Kerry Earnhardt	14	15	14	33	34	31	17	26	40	19	17	14	35	14	30	34	15	33	41													25	23		1767
28	Jason Schuler	43	39	25	22	42	38	19	35	42		20	41	DNQ	40	13	36	26	DNQ	39	38	28	39	34	33	34		34	22	39	23	38		DNQ	DNQ	1765
29	Jason White **(R)**				40	32		31	21		42	23	26		34	17	25	27	26	23	22	20	30	32	DNQ	30	30	23	35	35	41					1754
30	Joey Clanton **(R)**										22	15	18	26	27	27	16	20	11	14	27	5	41	24	31	22	37	27								1716
31	Joe Nemechek	**QL**		1	34		1	**2**		43	36			QL	**1**				18	43	31			13				40	9	36			4		19	1704
32	Brad Teague	DNQ	29		23	30		33	23	DNQ	23	37	25	39	36	37	33	Wth	42	35	39	34	40	33	20	24	41	30	41	DNQ	37	27	34	DNQ		1647
33	Chad Blount **(R)**	11	32	29	18	31	5	41	8	33	17	29						40						15			35		36	27	21	37			37	1581
34	Casey Mears													15	28					**4**				7	41	9	31	28	12	15		20	21	21	8	1525
35	Greg Biffle													12					23	QL				21	38	29	28	11	3	1*	**39**	**1**	10	11	**13**	1502
36	Tim Fedewa												QL								12	13	13	25	24	19	18	17	18	25	20	24	24	24	42	1491
37	Casey Atwood													DNQ			9	19	27	21	32				18	10	11	25		32	7	28	8		43	1422
38	Regan Smith **(R)**		31	41	19	38	15		33	36	25	19	22	31	16	29	32	37	34			40													28	1313
39	Tony Raines			38		2	36			31	3			36						8					8		8	22	38				23			1230
40	Martin Truex Jr.								15		31				18		21						21		6			13						2	2	1228
41	Chase Montgomery **(R)**	10		36		22	12	13	39	25									37										27	34	26	34	30	31	33	1219
42	Ron Young		21	30	20	20			20			18	33			22	20									21			DNQ		14	32		35		1201
43	Dave Blaney										37			11	30					13	13			10			9			18		10			16	1133
44	Hermie Sadler	32	20	21	29	29	21	22	19	37	11																DNQ			42				39	29	1066
45	Tammy Jo Kirk																				34	21	29	39	37	25	22	24	33	37	28	35	33	32	32	1062
46	Tim Sauter		27		30						20			27			39	23			17				21		33				18	26		30		1028
47	Damon Lusk **(R)**	21		22			43			24				29				31	21		18			12					42						18	950
48	Kyle Busch													2									33			2		15			16	43		7		827
49	Jay Sauter	DNQ				36			24		40					9	40	17							40		26				13			28		818
50	David Reutimann						24		5	11						QL	37	5		32				6							**QL**					805
51	Hank Parker Jr.		38		6									7								15							5			5				783
52	Jason Leffler																												16	11		22	11	22	4	739
53	Morgan Shepherd		40	DNQ	27	39	33	11		41	35			DNQ	38		42	Wth			37					42	DNQ	DNQ	DNQ	40		41	40	DNQ	DNQ	727
54	Jeff Fuller	24						43	18					43		43			43			38			15			41	43	43	40	DNQ	DNQ	43		688
55	Chris Bingham **(R)**		34	37	26	37	26		42	38	34	34	30	33																						680
56	Gus Wasson					19		DNQ	DNQ						DNQ	19	22									37			40	DNQ		29	31	34	34	672
57	John Hayden					21			DNQ			24				18	DNQ					36	18	42	DNQ	36	43	35	DNQ	31	DNQ	DNQ	DNQ			663
58	Justin Ashburn		DNQ		42				37		DNQ	26	37			20	DNQ	43			43	35	43	41	DNQ	38	42	43	DNQ	DNQ	DNQ	DNQ	43	DNQ	DNQ	646
59	Brad Baker	40	24					30	41		DNQ			DNQ	19	15			36						42					29					DNQ	639
60	Paul Menard															12	14			37		23	9				DNQ						22			629
61	Mike McLaughlin	29		DNQ				39	QL		13		QL	30					9	30	26															615
62	Derrike Cope	13						14							20			30	35	33	35															601
63	Steadman Marlin			DNQ			28		25	15		39	24	32			24																			580
64	Lance Norick						35		17	35				DNQ		23	18		31	29																577
65	Jamie Mosley															21	DNQ			26		26		40	36	33	39	26	DNQ	DNQ						563
66	Dale Earnhardt Jr.	1*						1*											**1****																	555
67	Steve Grissom								40										29						26		14			28					30	482
68	Mike Potter		42		41	41			43			40	38		43	41	DNQ			36		32		DNQ		43										473
69	Ron Barfield Jr.	Wth			21								32		39			41			30					35	25									472
70	Mark Green												16												27			20						27	26	467
71	Dana White																	36			21	24	28		35		40			41	DNQ					466
72	Jeff Green	**36**												40														39	11	24					27	447
73	Wally Dallenbach Jr.																12												17			36	37		25	434
74	Donnie Neuenberger	20					41	21							42				30									36								408
75	Rick Markle							12					39				DNQ	42				27		DNQ		31										362
76	Jeff Burton			35																	16			20						38						330
77	Jeff Fultz	19	DNQ											16																22						318
78	Jimmy Kitchens															40	43		DNQ	24		33	37	43	43	DNQ	DNQ	DNQ								318
79	Josh Richeson											41								40	40	37	42						39		35	42	DNQ	DNQ		316
80	Dion Ciccarelli				24				DNQ		DNQ				24								26		DNQ		DNQ	42						DNQ		304
81	Randy MacDonald	22			39			42			DNQ															39	34						DNQ			287
82	Joe Aramendia		25	23			20												DNQ																DNQ	285
83	Kenny Hendrick										DNQ	21	42	DNQ	41	35	27	Wth								DNQ	DNQ	DNQ								280
84	Bruce Bechtel			24			32			28																							42			274
85	Shane Hall								38				43			39	28													DNQ	31					254
86	Jimmy Spencer					24	6																													241
87	Jeff Streeter								DNQ	29		38	29				41											DNQ	DNQ	DNQ	29		DNQ			241
88	Dwayne Leik																26			25				35								DNQ				231
89	Paul Wolfe																											16				19				221
90	Derek Hayes																														24			36	35	204
91	Bill Hoff												34								24		DNQ					38								201
92	Carlos Conteras									26																									17	197
93	Robby Benton	37	37	26			DNQ																													189
94	J. R. Robbs											27	36		37																					189
95	Jerry Reary																						31								38		36	DNQ		174
96	Lowell Bennett																	28					24													170
97	Jimmy Vasser	28																25																		167
98	Ted Musgrave																								3											165
99	Jeremy Mayfield																																	4		165
100	Blake Mallory																	32											37			40	DNQ			162
101	Larry Hollenbeck	Wth						17											40					DNQ												161
102	Steve Park			4																																160
103	Brad Loney																									32								25		155
104	Joe Buford	DNQ	41			35			DNQ			Wth				35																				153
105	Clint Vahsholtz			40																		18											DNQ		DNQ	152
106	Mike Skinner																						7													146
107	Jason Rudd										DNQ						DNQ										24	37								143
108	Caleb Holman										32							29							DNQ	Wth								DNQ		143
109	Tony Stewart																							11*												140
110	Tina Gordon							10																												134
111	Ryck Sanders																					39							26							131
112	Troy Cline			DNQ			DNQ			27	38																									131
113	Brian Tyler																						23								43					128
114	Carl Long		28								39																									125
115	Jeff Spraker																		28		41															119
116	Brian Weber		43		38	43						25	27		DNQ	DNQ																				117
117	Mardy Lindley																						16													115
118	David Keith																		41												32					107
119	Rick Carelli																					19														106
120	Shelby Howard																												20							103
121	Norm Benning								DNQ				40								36		DNQ		DNQ									DNQ		98
122	Dude Teate																						22								DNQ					97
123	Jon Wood																																		22	97
124	Jody Lavender		23																																	94
125	Stan Boyd														23		DNQ							QL									DNQ		DNQ	94
126	Bobby Gerhart							DNQ											24																	91
127	Anthony Lazzaro																												25							88
128	Toby Porter	26																																		85
129	Mike Garvey																																26			85
130	Eric McClure																																	26		85
131	Brent Moore																						27								DNQ					82
132	Justin Hobgood																														27			DNQ		82
133	Jay Sommers																								28											79
134	Justin Labonte																							29												76
135	Billy Boat																																29			76
136	Vern Slagh																							30												73
137	Jeremy Clements																					31										DNQ				70
138	Jimmy Henderson																										DNQ	DNQ			33	DNQ				64
139	Kevin Conway																															33				64
140	Michael Lewis																														34					61
141	Lyndon Amick							36																												55
142	Gene Allbert Jr.																						36													55
143	Shane Wallace																										36									55
144	Elliott Sadler																																		36	55
145	Brett Oakley																	38					DNQ		DNQ											49
146	Jamie Aube																						38													49
147	Rich Bickle																																38	DNQ		49
148	Eddy McKean			39																																46
149	Tim Edwards																	39																		46
150	Phil Bonifield																									40										43
151	Andy Belmont						42																													37
152	Don Satterfield															42																				37
153	A. J. Alsup																				42															37
154	Wayne Edwards																					43														34
155	Kenny Wallace											10																								
156	Jerry Robertson																					41														
157	Mark Day	DNQ																																		
158	C. W. Smith	DNQ																																		
159	Michael Dokken		DNQ																																	
160	Wayne Jacks			DNQ																																
161	Scott Lynch			DNQ																																
162	Kevin Ray							DNQ																												
163	Greg Pursley									DNQ																										
164	Jason Hedlesky									DNQ									DNQ												DNQ					
165	Brian Conz												DNQ																							
166	Dan Pardus															QL			DNQ							DNQ										
167	Drew White																					DNQ														
168	Butch Jarvis																								DNQ						DNQ					
169	Daniel Johnson																								DNQ											
170	Franklin Butler III																										DNQ									
171	Wayne Anderson																													DNQ		DNQ				
172	Freddy Tame																																DNQ			
173	Brad Mueller																	Wth																		
Pos	Driver	DAY	CAR	LVS	DAR	BRI	TEX	TAL	NSH	CAL	RCH	GTY	NAZ	CLT	DOV	NSH	KEN	MIL	DAY	CHI	NHA	PPR	IRP	MCH	BRI	DAR	RCH	DOV	KAN	CLT	MEM	ATL	PHO	CAR	HOM	Pts

== Rookie of the Year ==
Despite not completing a full schedule and running for two different teams, David Stremme was named the 2003 Busch Series Rookie of the Year, posting three top-five finishes. Runner-up Coy Gibbs ran the full schedule and finished 14th in points, but did not accumulate enough rookie points to overtake Stremme. He would retire from racing at the end of the year. Third-place finisher Joey Clanton shared the #27 Brewco Motorsports ride with fellow rookie Chase Montgomery, while Chad Blount finished fourth running part-time with Braun and Carroll Racing. Regan Smith, Damon Lusk, and Chris Bingham were released from their rides during the season.

== See also ==
- 2003 NASCAR Winston Cup Series
- 2003 NASCAR Craftsman Truck Series
- 2003 ARCA Re/Max Series
- 2003 NASCAR Goody's Dash Series
