= 2001 NASCAR Busch Series =

American motorsport season

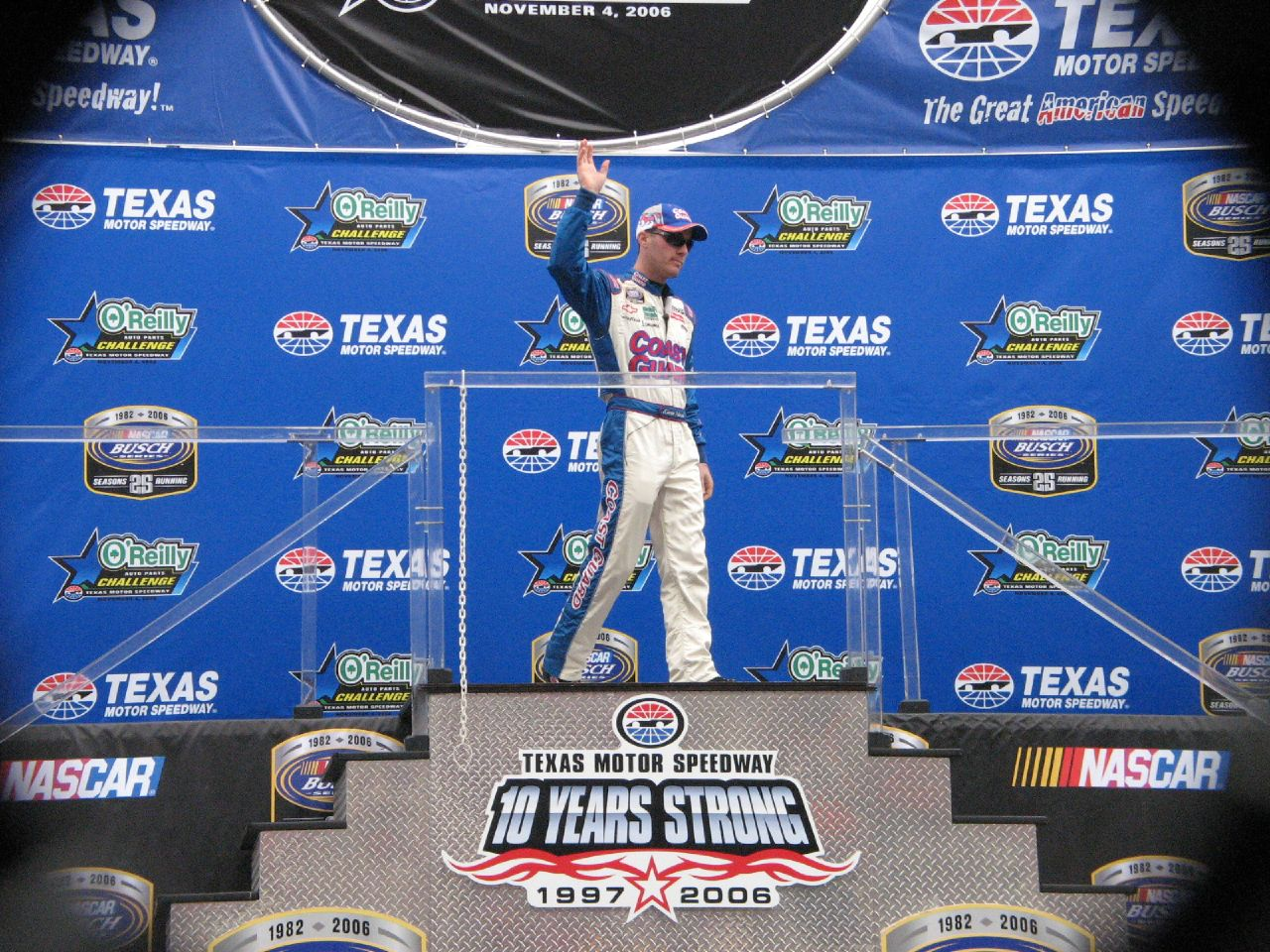
Kevin Harvick, pictured in 2006, the 2001 Busch Series champion

The 2001 NASCAR Busch Series began February 17 and ended November 10. Kevin Harvick of Richard Childress Racing was champion.

== Teams and drivers ==
=== Full schedule ===
| Team | Car(s) | No. | Driver(s) | Listed owner(s) | Crew chief |
|---|---|---|---|---|---|
| Akins Motorsports | Ford Taurus | 98 | Elton Sawyer | Brad Akins | Ricky Viers |
| BACE Motorsports | Chevrolet Monte Carlo | 33 | Tony Raines | Brian Baumgardner | Terry Wooten |
| BACE Motorsports | Chevrolet Monte Carlo | 74 | Chad Little | Bill Baumgardner | Eddie Pardue |
| Bill Davis Racing | Pontiac Grand Prix | 23 | Scott Wimmer (R) | Gail Davis | Bootie Barker |
| Brewco Motorsports | Chevrolet Monte Carlo; Pontiac Grand Prix | 27 | Jamie McMurray (R) | Tammy Brewer | Jason Ratcliff |
| Brewco Motorsports | Chevrolet Monte Carlo; Pontiac Grand Prix | 37 | Kevin Grubb | Clarence Brewer | Terry Shirley |
| Carroll Racing | Chevrolet Monte Carlo | 26 | Bobby Hamilton Jr. | Dave Carroll | Todd Lohse |
| Cicci-Welliver Racing | Chevrolet Monte Carlo | 34 | David Green | Frank Cicci | Steve Bird |
| Cicci-Welliver Racing | Chevrolet Monte Carlo | 36 | Hank Parker Jr. | Scott Welliver | Billy Nacewicz |
| Cicci-Welliver Racing | Chevrolet Monte Carlo | 66 | Tim Fedewa 15 | Jeffrey Welliver | Donnie Richeson |
| Cicci-Welliver Racing | Chevrolet Monte Carlo | 66 | Geoff Bodine 17 | Jeffrey Welliver | Donnie Richeson |
| Cicci-Welliver Racing | Chevrolet Monte Carlo | 66 | Casey Mears 1 | Jeffrey Welliver | Donnie Richeson |
| Curb Agajanian Motorsports | Chevrolet Monte Carlo | 43 | Jay Sauter 30 | Mike Curb | Gene Nead |
| Curb Agajanian Motorsports | Chevrolet Monte Carlo | 43 | Ron Hornaday Jr. 3 | Mike Curb | Gene Nead |
| Evans Motorsports | Chevrolet Monte Carlo; Pontiac Grand Prix | 7 | Randy LaJoie | Ed Evans | Wally Rogers |
| Foyt Racing | Chevrolet Monte Carlo | 14 | Larry Foyt 32 (R) | A. J. Foyt | Jon Wolfe |
| Foyt Racing | Chevrolet Monte Carlo | 14 | Mark Green 1 | A. J. Foyt | Jon Wolfe |
| Herzog Motorsports | Chevrolet Monte Carlo | 92 | Jimmie Johnson | William Herzog | Tony Liberati |
| Hensley Motorsports | Ford Taurus | 63 | Shane Hall | Hubert Hensley | Jeff Hensley |
| HighLine Performance Group | Chevrolet Monte Carlo | 11 | Marty Houston 16 (R) | Armando Fitz | Bob Temple |
| HighLine Performance Group | Chevrolet Monte Carlo | 11 | Ron Hornaday Jr. 9 | Armando Fitz | Bob Temple |
| HighLine Performance Group | Chevrolet Monte Carlo | 11 | Andy Santerre 3 | Armando Fitz | Bob Temple |
| HighLine Performance Group | Chevrolet Monte Carlo | 11 | Todd Bodine 4 | Armando Fitz | Bob Temple |
| HighLine Performance Group | Chevrolet Monte Carlo | 11 | Tim Fedewa 1 | Armando Fitz | Bob Temple |
| Innovative Motorsports | Chevrolet Monte Carlo | 48 | Kenny Wallace | George DeBidart | Gere Kennon |
| Jay Robinson Racing | Chevrolet Monte Carlo; Ford Taurus; Pontiac Grand Prix | 49 | Andy Kirby 3 | Jay Robinson | Jay Robinson |
| Jay Robinson Racing | Chevrolet Monte Carlo; Ford Taurus; Pontiac Grand Prix | 49 | Robbie Faggart 10 | Jay Robinson | Jay Robinson |
| Jay Robinson Racing | Chevrolet Monte Carlo; Ford Taurus; Pontiac Grand Prix | 49 | Brian Tyler 3 | Jay Robinson | Jay Robinson |
| Jay Robinson Racing | Chevrolet Monte Carlo; Ford Taurus; Pontiac Grand Prix | 49 | Carl Long 1 | Jay Robinson | Jay Robinson |
| Jay Robinson Racing | Chevrolet Monte Carlo; Ford Taurus; Pontiac Grand Prix | 49 | A. J. Frank 2 | Jay Robinson | Jay Robinson |
| Jay Robinson Racing | Chevrolet Monte Carlo; Ford Taurus; Pontiac Grand Prix | 49 | Jerry McCart 1 | Jay Robinson | Jay Robinson |
| Jay Robinson Racing | Chevrolet Monte Carlo; Ford Taurus; Pontiac Grand Prix | 49 | Joe Bush 1 | Jay Robinson | Jay Robinson |
| Jay Robinson Racing | Chevrolet Monte Carlo; Ford Taurus; Pontiac Grand Prix | 49 | Phil Bonifield 1 | Jay Robinson | Jay Robinson |
| Jay Robinson Racing | Chevrolet Monte Carlo; Ford Taurus; Pontiac Grand Prix | 49 | Dick Trickle 1 | Jay Robinson | Jay Robinson |
| Jay Robinson Racing | Chevrolet Monte Carlo; Ford Taurus; Pontiac Grand Prix | 49 | Brian Weber 1 | Jay Robinson | Jay Robinson |
| Jay Robinson Racing | Chevrolet Monte Carlo; Ford Taurus; Pontiac Grand Prix | 49 | Ken Alexander 7 | Jay Robinson | Jay Robinson |
| Jay Robinson Racing | Chevrolet Monte Carlo; Ford Taurus; Pontiac Grand Prix | 49 | Philip Morris 2 | Jay Robinson | Jay Robinson |
| Joe Gibbs Racing | Pontiac Grand Prix | 18 | Jeff Purvis 17 | Joe Gibbs | Doug Richert |
| Joe Gibbs Racing | Pontiac Grand Prix | 18 | Mike McLaughlin 16 | Joe Gibbs | Tim Shutt |
| Lewis Motorsports | Chevrolet Monte Carlo | 46 | Ashton Lewis | William Lewis | Charlie Lewis |
| ppc Racing | Ford Taurus | 10 | Jeff Green | Greg Pollex | Harold Holly |
| ppc Racing | Ford Taurus | 57 | Jason Keller | Keith Barnwell | Steve Addington |
| Reiser Enterprises | Chevrolet Monte Carlo | 17 | Matt Kenseth 23 | Robbie Reiser | Russ Strupp |
| Reiser Enterprises | Chevrolet Monte Carlo | 17 | Clay Rogers 9 | Robbie Reiser | Russ Strupp |
| Reiser Enterprises | Chevrolet Monte Carlo | 17 | Boris Said 1 | Robbie Reiser | Russ Strupp |
| ST Motorsports | Chevrolet Monte Carlo | 59 | Rich Bickle 25 | Tad Geschickter | Phil Hammer |
| ST Motorsports | Chevrolet Monte Carlo | 59 | Mike Chase 2 | Tad Geschickter | Phil Hammer |
| ST Motorsports | Chevrolet Monte Carlo | 59 | Mark Green 2 | Tad Geschickter | Phil Hammer |
| ST Motorsports | Chevrolet Monte Carlo | 59 | Jeff Purvis 3 | Tad Geschickter | Phil Hammer |
| ST Motorsports | Chevrolet Monte Carlo | 59 | Stacy Compton 1 | Tad Geschickter | Phil Hammer |
| Richard Childress Racing | Chevrolet Monte Carlo | 2 | Kevin Harvick | Richard Childress | Todd Berrier |
| Richard Childress Racing | Chevrolet Monte Carlo | 21 | Mike Dillon 6 | Richard Childress | Gil Martin |
| Richard Childress Racing | Chevrolet Monte Carlo | 21 | Mike Skinner 14 | Richard Childress | Gil Martin |
| Richard Childress Racing | Chevrolet Monte Carlo | 21 | Ted Christopher 1 | Richard Childress | Gil Martin |
| Richard Childress Racing | Chevrolet Monte Carlo | 21 | Travis Kvapil 1 | Richard Childress | Gil Martin |
| Richard Childress Racing | Chevrolet Monte Carlo | 21 | Robby Gordon 3 | Richard Childress | Gil Martin |
| Richard Childress Racing | Chevrolet Monte Carlo | 21 | Jeff Purvis 3 | Richard Childress | Gil Martin |
| Richard Childress Racing | Chevrolet Monte Carlo | 21 | Johnny Sauter 5 | Richard Childress | Gil Martin |
| Roush Racing | Ford Taurus | 60 | Greg Biffle (R) | Jack Roush | Randy Goss |
| Team Rensi Motorsports | Chevrolet Monte Carlo | 25 | Chad Chaffin 7 | Ed Rensi | Greg Ely |
| Team Rensi Motorsports | Chevrolet Monte Carlo | 25 | David Donohue 12 | Ed Rensi | Greg Ely |
| Team Rensi Motorsports | Chevrolet Monte Carlo | 25 | Andy Houston 1 | Ed Rensi | Greg Ely |
| Team Rensi Motorsports | Chevrolet Monte Carlo | 25 | Randy Tolsma 12 | Ed Rensi | Greg Ely |
| Team Rensi Motorsports | Chevrolet Monte Carlo | 25 | Jay Sauter 1 | Ed Rensi | Greg Ely |

=== Limited schedule ===
| Team | Car(s) | No. | Driver(s) | Listed owner(s) | Crew chief |
|---|---|---|---|---|---|
| Akins Motorsports | Ford Taurus | 38 | Christian Elder 17 | Brad Akins | Wes Ward |
| Al Rudd Auto | Ford Taurus | 85 | Jason Rudd 3 | Al Rudd | N/A |
| Alsup Racing | Chevrolet Monte Carlo | 72 | A. J. Alsup 7 | William Alsup | N/A |
| AP Performance Racing | Chevrolet Monte Carlo | 19 | Tim Sauter 2 | Alec Pinsonneault | N/A |
| Cavin Councilor | Chevrolet Monte Carlo | 19 | Ed Berrier 1 | Cavin Councilor | N/A |
| Emerald Performance Group | Chevrolet Monte Carlo | 19 | Mike Bliss 1 | David Ridling | N/A |
| BAM Racing | Chevrolet Monte Carlo | 22 | Andy Hillenburg 1 | Thomas Mohrhauser | N/A |
| George White | Chevrolet Monte Carlo | 22 | Drew White 7 | George White | N/A |
| George White | Chevrolet Monte Carlo | 22 | Danny Bagwell 1 | George White | N/A |
| Beahr Racing | Ford Taurus | 5 | Eddie Beahr 3 | Wayne Beahr | Leonard Kirsh |
| Tommy Baldwin Racing | Chevrolet Monte Carlo | 5 | Ward Burton 2 | Tommy Baldwin Jr. | N/A |
| Biagi Brothers Racing | Chevrolet Monte Carlo | 4 | Mike Wallace 8 | Fred Biagi | N/A |
| Big Fan Racing | Chevrolet Monte Carlo; Pontiac Grand Prix | 89 | Lance Hooper 1 | Mark Watkins | N/A |
| Big Fan Racing | Chevrolet Monte Carlo; Pontiac Grand Prix | 89 | Mardy Lindley 1 | Mark Watkins | N/A |
| Big Fan Racing | Chevrolet Monte Carlo; Pontiac Grand Prix | 89 | J. R. Robbs 1 | Mark Watkins | N/A |
| Kimberlee Smith | Ford Taurus | 89 | Morgan Shepherd 1 | Kimberlee Smith | N/A |
| BLV Motorsports | Chevrolet Monte Carlo | 29 | Brian Vickers 4 | Clyde Vickers | Patrick Donahue |
| Brett Bodine Racing | Ford Taurus | 6 | Josh Richeson 2 | Brett Bodine | N/A |
| Joe Bessey Motorsports | Pontiac Grand Prix; Chevrolet Monte Carlo | 6 | Joe Bessey 3 | Joe Bessey | N/A |
| Joe Bessey Motorsports | Pontiac Grand Prix; Chevrolet Monte Carlo | 6 | Stevie Hodgson 1 | Joe Bessey | N/A |
| Joe Bessey Motorsports | Chevrolet Monte Carlo | 64 | Stevie Hodgson 1 | Joe Bessey | N/A |
| Brewco Motorsports | Chevrolet Monte Carlo | 28 | Brad Baker 16 | Gary Baker | Randy Seals |
| Brewco Motorsports | Chevrolet Monte Carlo | 47 | Sean Woodside 1 | Clarence Brewer | N/A |
| Brewco Motorsports | Chevrolet Monte Carlo | 47 | Clay Dale 1 | Todd Wilkerson | N/A |
| Buckshot Racing | Chevrolet Monte Carlo; Pontiac Grand Prix | 00 | Todd Bodine 12 | Billy Jones | Gary Cogswell |
| Buckshot Racing | Chevrolet Monte Carlo; Pontiac Grand Prix | 00 | Buckshot Jones 6 | Billy Jones | Gary Cogswell |
| Buckshot Racing | Chevrolet Monte Carlo; Pontiac Grand Prix | 00 | Tim Fedewa 7 | Billy Jones | Gary Cogswell |
| Buckshot Racing | Chevrolet Monte Carlo; Pontiac Grand Prix | 00 | Tom Hubert 1 | Billy Jones | Gary Cogswell |
| Buckshot Racing | Chevrolet Monte Carlo | 04 | Jason Schuler 2 | Billy Jones | N/A |
| Carroll Racing | Chevrolet Monte Carlo | 08 | Bobby Hamilton 1 | Dave Carroll | N/A |
| Carroll Racing | Chevrolet Monte Carlo | 08 | Blaise Alexander 2 | Dave Carroll | N/A |
| Chris Hoiles Motorsports | Pontiac Grand Prix; Chevrolet Monte Carlo | 96 | Gus Wasson 1 | Chris Hoiles | N/A |
| Chris Hoiles Motorsports | Pontiac Grand Prix; Chevrolet Monte Carlo | 96 | Jeff Oakley 2 | Chris Hoiles | N/A |
| Chris Hoiles Motorsports | Pontiac Grand Prix; Chevrolet Monte Carlo | 96 | Tina Gordon 1 | Chris Hoiles | N/A |
| Curb Agajanian Motorsports | Chevrolet Monte Carlo | 97 | Phil Parsons 1 | Cary Agajanian | N/A |
| DF2 Motorsports | Chevrolet Monte Carlo | 97 | Robbie Faggart 1 | Frederick Bickford II | N/A |
| DF2 Motorsports | Chevrolet Monte Carlo | 94 | Joe Bush 2 | Frederick Bickford II | Joey Knuckles |
| DF2 Motorsports | Chevrolet Monte Carlo | 94 | Derrike Cope 4 | Frederick Bickford II | Joey Knuckles |
| DF2 Motorsports | Chevrolet Monte Carlo | 94 | Rick Markle 2 | Frederick Bickford II | Joey Knuckles |
| DF2 Motorsports | Chevrolet Monte Carlo | 94 | Robbie Faggart 1 | Frederick Bickford II | Joey Knuckles |
| DF2 Motorsports | Chevrolet Monte Carlo | 94 | Brian Tyler 3 | Frederick Bickford II | Joey Knuckles |
| DF2 Motorsports | Chevrolet Monte Carlo | 94 | Bobby Dotter 1 | Frederick Bickford II | Joey Knuckles |
| Jay Robinson Racing | Pontiac Grand Prix | 94 | Nate Monteith 1 | Jay Robinson | Zandel Bowers |
| Jim Edwards | Dodge Intrepid | 94 | Steven Christian 1 | Jim Edwards | N/A |
| Davis & Weight Motorsports | Ford Taurus | 55 | Mark Green 10 | Jerry Davis | Skip Eyler |
| Day Enterprise Racing | Pontiac Grand Prix; Chevrolet Monte Carlo | 16 | David Starr 3 | Wayne Day | Ronnie Pendelton |
| Day Enterprise Racing | Pontiac Grand Prix; Chevrolet Monte Carlo | 16 | Sammy Sanders 3 | Wayne Day | Ronnie Pendelton |
| Day Enterprise Racing | Pontiac Grand Prix; Chevrolet Monte Carlo | 16 | Mark Day 2 | Wayne Day | Ronnie Pendelton |
| Day Enterprise Racing | Pontiac Grand Prix; Chevrolet Monte Carlo | 16 | Chad Chaffin 7 | Wayne Day | Ronnie Pendelton |
| Fain Racing | Chevrolet Monte Carlo | 13 | Drew White 1 | William Fain | N/A |
| Foyt Racing | Chevrolet Monte Carlo | 41 | David Starr 1 | A. J. Foyt | N/A |
| Foyt Racing | Chevrolet Monte Carlo | 41 | Mark Green 1 | A. J. Foyt | N/A |
| Wyler Racing | Chevrolet Monte Carlo | 41 | Ronnie Hornaday 1 | Jeff Wyler | N/A |
| Gerald Wittman | Ford Taurus | 93 | Wayman Wittman 1 | Gerald Wittman | N/A |
| Team Goeway | Chevrolet Monte Carlo | 93 | Dave Blaney 2 | Bryan Goeway | Mike Greci |
| Hoff Motorsports | Chevrolet Monte Carlo; Pontiac Grand Prix | 93 | Bill Hoff 7 | Jeff Shutt | Jeff Shutt |
| Hoff Motorsports | Chevrolet Monte Carlo | 99 | Bill Hoff 2 | Jeff Shutt | Jeff Shutt |
| Michael Waltrip Racing | Chevrolet Monte Carlo | 99 | Michael Waltrip 12 | Michael Waltrip | N/A |
| Michael Waltrip Racing | Chevrolet Monte Carlo | 99 | Shawna Robinson 3 | Michael Waltrip | N/A |
| Michael Waltrip Racing | Chevrolet Monte Carlo | 99 | Kerry Earnhardt 3 | Michael Waltrip | N/A |
| George Taylor | Chevrolet Monte Carlo | 05 | Hal Goodson 1 | George Taylor | N/A |
| Gerhart Racing | Chevrolet Monte Carlo | 65 | Bobby Gerhart 4 | Billy Gerhart | N/A |
| GIC-Mixon Motorsports | Chevrolet Monte Carlo; Pontiac Grand Prix | 44 | Mike Harmon 18 | Gregg Mixon | N/A |
| Monteith Racing | Chevrolet Monte Carlo | 44 | Nate Monteith 1 | Donald Monteith | Zandel Bowers |
| Monteith Racing | Chevrolet Monte Carlo | 84 | Nate Monteith 1 | Donald Monteith | Zandel Bowers |
| Glidden Motorsports | Ford Taurus | 84 | Dion Ciccarelli 3 | Martyn Glidden | N/A |
| Henderson Motorsports | Chevrolet Monte Carlo | 75 | Brad Teague 1 | Charlie Henderson | Ron Denton |
| Henderson Motorsports | Chevrolet Monte Carlo | 75 | Scott Hansen 2 | Charlie Henderson | Ron Denton |
| Henderson Motorsports | Chevrolet Monte Carlo | 75 | Randy Ratliff 2 | Charlie Henderson | Ron Denton |
| MacDonald Motorsports | Chevrolet Monte Carlo | 75 | Lance Hooper 1 | Randy MacDonald | N/A |
| Hendrick Motorsports | Chevrolet Monte Carlo | 24 | Ricky Hendrick 3 | Rick Hendrick | N/A |
| Hensley Motorsports | Ford Taurus | 80 | Rodney Sawyers 2 | Jeff Hensley | N/A |
| Hensley Motorsports | Ford Taurus | 80 | Chad Chaffin 1 | Jeff Hensley | N/A |
| Hensley Motorsports | Ford Taurus | 80 | Philip Morris 1 | Jeff Hensley | N/A |
| Hensley Motorsports | Ford Taurus | 80 | Damon Lusk 1 | Jeff Hensley | N/A |
| HighLine Performance Group | Chevrolet Monte Carlo | 8 | Blaise Alexander 4 | Armando Fitz | Dave Leiner |
| HighLine Performance Group | Chevrolet Monte Carlo | 8 | Frank Kimmel 1 | Armando Fitz | Dave Leiner |
| HighLine Performance Group | Chevrolet Monte Carlo | 8 | Jeff Falk 5 | Armando Fitz | Dave Leiner |
| HighLine Performance Group | Chevrolet Monte Carlo | 8 | Michael Dokken 4 | Armando Fitz | Dave Leiner |
| HighLine Performance Group | Chevrolet Monte Carlo | 8 | Jason Rudd 1 | Armando Fitz | Dave Leiner |
| HighLine Performance Group | Chevrolet Monte Carlo | 8 | Mario Hernandez 1 | Armando Fitz | Dave Leiner |
| HighLine Performance Group | Chevrolet Monte Carlo | 8 | Mark Voigt 1 | Armando Fitz | Dave Leiner |
| HighLine Performance Group | Chevrolet Monte Carlo | 8 | Josh Richeson 1 | Armando Fitz | Dave Leiner |
| Jim & Judie Motorsports | Chevrolet Monte Carlo | 32 | Dan Pardus 9 | Jim Gardner | Larry Moore |
| Jimmy Craig | Chevrolet Monte Carlo | 86 | Jeff Fultz 3 | Jimmy Craig | N/A |
| Winner's Circle Racing | Chevrolet Monte Carlo | 86 | Sean Studer 2 | Thomas Studer | N/A |
| Joe Gibbs Racing | Pontiac Grand Prix | 20 | Mike McLaughlin 17 | Joe Gibbs | Tim Shutt |
| Joe Gibbs Racing | Pontiac Grand Prix | 20 | Mark McFarland 1 | Joe Gibbs | Doug Richert |
| Ken Schrader Racing | Chevrolet Monte Carlo | 07 | Ken Schrader 1 | Ken Schrader | N/A |
| Whitaker Racing | Chevrolet Monte Carlo | 07 | Brendan Gaughan 1 | Ed Whitaker | N/A |
| Whitaker Racing | Chevrolet Monte Carlo | 07 | Lance Hooper 1 | Ed Whitaker | N/A |
| Leik Motorsports | Chevrolet Monte Carlo | 81 | Dwayne Leik 5 | Dwayne Leik | N/A |
| Marsh Racing | Chevrolet Monte Carlo | 31 | Steve Park 7 | Ted Marsh | Ted Marsh |
| Marsh Racing | Chevrolet Monte Carlo | 31 | Andy Santerre 3 | Ted Marsh | Ted Marsh |
| Matrix Motorsports | Ford Taurus | 79 | Stanton Barrett 1 | Kevin Lepage | N/A |
| Matrix Motorsports | Ford Taurus | 71 | Kevin Lepage 15 | Kevin Lepage | N/A |
| Matrix Motorsports | Ford Taurus | 71 | Scott Pruett 1 | Kevin Lepage | N/A |
| Young Racing | Chevrolet Monte Carlo | 71 | Ron Young 4 | Jerry Young | N/A |
| Young Racing | Chevrolet Monte Carlo | 70 | Ron Young 2 | Jerry Young | N/A |
| Maurtco Motorsports | Chevrolet Monte Carlo | 73 | Joe Cooksey 3 | Don Fauerbach | N/A |
| Means Racing | Ford Taurus | 52 | Jason Rudd 2 | Jimmy Means | N/A |
| Means Racing | Ford Taurus | 52 | Scott Gaylord 2 | Jimmy Means | N/A |
| Means Racing | Ford Taurus | 52 | Brad Teague 5 | Jimmy Means | N/A |
| Means Racing | Ford Taurus | 52 | Kertus Davis 3 | Jimmy Means | N/A |
| Means Racing | Ford Taurus | 52 | Eric Jones 1 | Jimmy Means | N/A |
| Means Racing | Ford Taurus | 52 | Mike Potter 1 | Jimmy Means | N/A |
| Means Racing | Ford Taurus | 52 | Ricky Sanders 1 | Jimmy Means | N/A |
| Means Racing | Ford Taurus | 52 | Andy Kirby 1 | Jimmy Means | N/A |
| NEMCO Motorsports | Chevrolet Monte Carlo; Pontiac Grand Prix | 87 | Joe Nemechek 13 | Joe Nemechek | Brian Pattie |
| NEMCO Motorsports | Chevrolet Monte Carlo; Pontiac Grand Prix | 87 | Dale Earnhardt Jr. 1 | Joe Nemechek | Brian Pattie |
| NEMCO Motorsports | Chevrolet Monte Carlo; Pontiac Grand Prix | 87 | Ron Fellows 1 | Joe Nemechek | Brian Pattie |
| NEMCO Motorsports | Chevrolet Monte Carlo | 88 | Jeff Fuller 1 | Joe Nemechek | N/A |
| Penske Racing South | Ford Taurus | 02 | Ryan Newman 15 | Roger Penske | N/A |
| Petty Enterprises | Chevrolet Monte Carlo | 45 | Steve Grissom 1 | Kyle Petty | N/A |
| Phoenix Racing | Chevrolet Monte Carlo; Pontiac Grand Prix | 1 | P. J. Jones 4 | James Finch | Marc Reno |
| Phoenix Racing | Chevrolet Monte Carlo; Pontiac Grand Prix | 1 | Jimmy Spencer 18 | James Finch | Marc Reno |
| Phoenix Racing | Chevrolet Monte Carlo; Pontiac Grand Prix | 1 | Bobby Hamilton 1 | James Finch | Marc Reno |
| Phoenix Racing | Chevrolet Monte Carlo; Pontiac Grand Prix | 1 | Kevin Lepage 1 | James Finch | Marc Reno |
| Phoenix Racing | Chevrolet Monte Carlo; Pontiac Grand Prix | 1 | Joe Ruttman 3 | James Finch | Marc Reno |
| ppc Racing | Ford Taurus | 15 | Billy Parker 2 | Harold Holly | N/A |
| PRW Racing | Ford Taurus | 77 | Kelly Denton 7 (R) | Tony Hall | Jimmy Means |
| PRW Racing | Ford Taurus | 77 | Mike Harmon 1 | Tony Hall | Jimmy Means |
| PRW Racing | Ford Taurus | 77 | Jason Rudd 2 | Tony Hall | Jimmy Means |
| PRW Racing | Ford Taurus | 77 | Brad Teague 10 | Tony Hall | Jimmy Means |
| PRW Racing | Ford Taurus | 77 | John Finger 1 | Tony Hall | Jimmy Means |
| PRW Racing | Ford Taurus | 77 | Mark Green 1 | Tony Hall | Jimmy Means |
| PRW Racing | Ford Taurus | 77 | Jerry Robertson 1 | Tony Hall | Jimmy Means |
| PRW Racing | Ford Taurus | 77 | Andy Kirby 3 | Tony Hall | Jimmy Means |
| PRW Racing | Ford Taurus | 77 | Shane Huffman 1 | Tony Hall | Jimmy Means |
| PRW Racing | Ford Taurus | 77 | Kertus Davis 1 | Tony Hall | Jimmy Means |
| PRW Racing | Ford Taurus | 77 | Ken Alexander 1 | Tony Hall | Jimmy Means |
| PRW Racing | Ford Taurus | 77 | Ross Thompson 1 | Tony Hall | Jimmy Means |
| Red Racing | Chevrolet Monte Carlo | 91 | Stanton Barrett 5 | Jody Looney | N/A |
| ST Motorsports | Chevrolet Monte Carlo | 91 | Mike Chase 1 | Tad Geschickter | N/A |
| Roush Racing | Ford Taurus | 9 | Jeff Burton 11 | Jack Roush | Tommy Morgan |
| Sadler Brothers Racing | Ford Taurus | 95 | Steadman Marlin 7 | The Sadler Brothers | N/A |
| Santerre-Reece Motorsports | Chevrolet Monte Carlo | 01 | Andy Santerre 5 | James Reece | N/A |
| Santerre-Reece Motorsports | Chevrolet Monte Carlo | 01 | Tom Carey Jr. 2 | James Reece | N/A |
| SKI Motorsports | Chevrolet Monte Carlo | 30 | Christian Fittipaldi 1 | Chris Lencheski | N/A |
| Voigt Racing | Chevrolet Monte Carlo | 30 | Mark Voigt 4 | Deane Voigt | N/A |
| Smith Brothers Motorsports | Chevrolet Monte Carlo | 67 | C. W. Smith 1 | Mike Smith | N/A |
| Streeter Racing | Chevrolet Monte Carlo | 83 | Jeff Streeter 4 | Stephen Streeter | N/A |
| TDS Enterprises | Chevrolet Monte Carlo | 78 | Sammy Ragan 1 | Terry Ragan | N/A |
| Team Amick Motorsports | Chevrolet Monte Carlo; Pontiac Grand Prix | 35 | Lyndon Amick 6 | Bill Amick | Tony Lambert |
| Team Amick Motorsports | Chevrolet Monte Carlo; Pontiac Grand Prix | 50 | Joe Varde 1 | Bill Amick | N/A |
| Team Bristol Motorsports | Chevrolet Monte Carlo | 54 | Kelly Denton 17 | Rick Goodwin | N/A |
| Team Bristol Motorsports | Chevrolet Monte Carlo | 54 | Tom Hubert 1 | Rick Goodwin | N/A |
| Team Bristol Motorsports | Chevrolet Monte Carlo | 54 | Steadman Marlin 1 | Rick Goodwin | N/A |
| Team Bristol Motorsports | Chevrolet Monte Carlo | 54 | Tim Fedewa 1 | Rick Goodwin | N/A |
| Truex Motorsports | Chevrolet Monte Carlo | 56 | Martin Truex Jr. 2 | Martin Truex Sr. | N/A |
| Woodland Racing | Pontiac Grand Prix | 40 | Rich Woodland Jr. 2 | Richard Woodland | N/A |
| WP Motorsports | Chevrolet Monte Carlo | 12 | Mike Swaim Jr. 3 | Charles Woodruff Jr. | Keith Strunk |
| WP Motorsports | Chevrolet Monte Carlo | 12 | Tim Fedewa 2 | Charles Woodruff Jr. | Keith Strunk |
| Xpress Motorsports | Chevrolet Monte Carlo; Pontiac Grand Prix | 61 | Tim Sauter 16 (R) | Steve Coulter | Dave Fuge |

Notes:

- If under "team", the owner's name is listed and in italics, that means the name of the race team that fielded the car is unknown.

== Schedule ==
| No. | Race title | Track | Date |
|---|---|---|---|
| 1 | NAPA Auto Parts 300 | Daytona International Speedway, Daytona Beach | February 17 |
| 2 | Alltel 200 | North Carolina Speedway, Rockingham | February 24 |
| 3 | Sam's Town 300 | Las Vegas Motor Speedway, Las Vegas | March 3 |
| 4 | Aaron's 312 | Atlanta Motor Speedway, Hampton | March 10 |
| 5 | SunCom 200 | Darlington Raceway, Darlington | March 17 |
| 6 | Cheez-It 250 | Bristol Motor Speedway, Bristol | March 24 |
| 7 | Jani-King 300 | Texas Motor Speedway, Fort Worth | March 31 |
| 8 | Pepsi 300 | Nashville Superspeedway, Lebanon | April 14 |
| 9 | Subway 300 | Talladega Superspeedway, Talladega | April 21 |
| 10 | Auto Club 300 | California Speedway, Fontana | April 28 |
| 11 | Hardee's 250 | Richmond International Raceway, Richmond | May 4 |
| 12 | CVS Pharmacy 200 Presented by Bayer | New Hampshire International Speedway, Loudon | May 12 |
| 13 | Nazareth 200 | Nazareth Speedway, Nazareth | May 20 |
| 14 | Carquest Auto Parts 300 | Lowe's Motor Speedway, Concord | May 26 |
| 15 | MBNA Platinum 200 | Dover Downs International Speedway, Dover | June 2 |
| 16 | Outback Steakhouse 300 | Kentucky Speedway, Sparta | June 16 |
| 17 | GNC Live Well 250 | Milwaukee Mile, West Allis | July 1 |
| 18 | GNC Live Well 200 | Watkins Glen International, Watkins Glen | July 8 |
| 19 | Sam's Club Presents the Hills Bros. Coffee 300 | Chicagoland Speedway, Joliet | July 14 |
| 20 | Carquest Auto Parts 250 | Gateway International Raceway, Madison | July 21 |
| 21 | NAPA Autocare 250 | Pikes Peak International Raceway, Fountain | July 28 |
| 22 | Kroger 200 | Indianapolis Raceway Park, Brownsburg | August 4 |
| 23 | NAPAonline.com 250 | Michigan International Speedway, Brooklyn | August 18 |
| 24 | Food City 250 | Bristol Motor Speedway, Bristol | August 24 |
| 25 | South Carolina 200 | Darlington Raceway, Darlington | September 1 |
| 26 | Autolite / Fram 250 | Richmond International Raceway, Richmond | September 7 |
| 27 | MBNA.com 200 | Dover Downs International Speedway, Dover | September 22 |
| 28 | Mr. Goodcents 300 | Kansas Speedway, Kansas City | September 29 |
| 29 | Little Trees 300 | Lowe's Motor Speedway, Concord | October 6 |
| 30 | Sam's Town 250 | Memphis Motorsports Park, Millington | October 14 |
| 31 | Outback Steakhouse 200 | Phoenix International Raceway, Phoenix | October 27 |
| 32 | Sam's Club 200 | North Carolina Speedway, Rockingham | November 3 |
| 33 | GNC Live Well 300 | Homestead-Miami Speedway, Homestead | November 10 |

== Races ==
=== NAPA Auto Parts 300 ===
The NAPA Auto Parts 300 was held February 17 at Daytona International Speedway. Joe Nemechek won the pole.

Top ten results

1. #7 - Randy LaJoie
2. #2 - Kevin Harvick
3. #17 - Matt Kenseth
4. #10 - Jeff Green
5. #92 - Jimmie Johnson
6. #20 - Mike McLaughlin
7. #57 - Jason Keller
8. #48 - Kenny Wallace
9. #74 - Chad Little
10. #61 - Tim Sauter

Failed to qualify: Christian Elder (#38), Andy Kirby (#49)

=== Alltel 200 ===
The Alltel 200 was held February 24 at North Carolina Speedway. Greg Biffle won the pole.

Top ten results

1. #00 - Todd Bodine
2. #2 - Kevin Harvick
3. #60 - Greg Biffle
4. #48 - Kenny Wallace
5. #26 - Bobby Hamilton Jr.
6. #18 - Jeff Purvis
7. #59 - Rich Bickle
8. #10 - Jeff Green
9. #02 - Ryan Newman
10. #57 - Jason Keller

Failed to qualify: none

- The race was the first NASCAR-sanctioned race in any division to be held after the death of Dale Earnhardt.

=== Sam's Town 300 ===
The Sam's Town 300 was held March 3 at Las Vegas Motor Speedway. Matt Kenseth won the pole.

Top ten results

1. #00 - Todd Bodine
2. #60 - Greg Biffle
3. #57 - Jason Keller
4. #33 - Tony Raines
5. #10 - Jeff Green
6. #9 - Jeff Burton
7. #87 - Joe Nemechek
8. #98 - Elton Sawyer
9. #20 - Mike McLaughlin
10. #43 - Jay Sauter

Failed to qualify: none

=== Aaron's 312 ===
The Aaron's 312 was held March 10 at Atlanta Motor Speedway. Ryan Newman won the pole.

Top ten results

1. #87 - Joe Nemechek
2. #60 - Greg Biffle
3. #99 - Michael Waltrip
4. #10 - Jeff Green
5. #00 - Todd Bodine
6. #18 - Jeff Purvis
7. #57 - Jason Keller
8. #2 - Kevin Harvick
9. #92 - Jimmie Johnson
10. #33 - Tony Raines

Failed to qualify: none

=== SunCom 200 ===
The SunCom 200 was held March 17 at Darlington Raceway. Ryan Newman won the pole.

Top ten results

1. #10 - Jeff Green
2. #17 - Matt Kenseth
3. #57 - Jason Keller
4. #48 - Kenny Wallace
5. #20 - Mike McLaughlin
6. #26 - Bobby Hamilton Jr.
7. #31 - Steve Park
8. #2 - Kevin Harvick
9. #98 - Elton Sawyer
10. #18 - Jeff Purvis

Failed to qualify: none

=== Cheez-It 250 ===
The Cheez-It 250 was held March 24 at Bristol Motor Speedway. Kevin Harvick won the pole.

Top ten results

1. #17 - Matt Kenseth
2. #66 - Tim Fedewa
3. #7 - Randy LaJoie
4. #92 - Jimmie Johnson
5. #48 - Kenny Wallace
6. #02 - Ryan Newman
7. #2 - Kevin Harvick
8. #33 - Tony Raines
9. #61 - Tim Sauter
10. #99 - Michael Waltrip

Failed to qualify: none

=== Jani-King 300 ===
The Jani-King 300 was held March 31 at Texas Motor Speedway. Matt Kenseth won the pole.

Top ten results

1. #2 - Kevin Harvick
2. #9 - Jeff Burton
3. #43 - Jay Sauter
4. #87 - Joe Nemechek
5. #17 - Matt Kenseth
6. #34 - David Green
7. #60 - Greg Biffle
8. #92 - Jimmie Johnson
9. #21 - Mike Skinner
10. #71 - Kevin Lepage

Failed to qualify: Mike Harmon (#44)

=== Pepsi 300 ===
The inaugural Pepsi 300 was held April 14 at Nashville Superspeedway. Kevin Harvick won the pole.

Top ten results

1. #60 - Greg Biffle*
2. #57 - Jason Keller
3. #23 - Scott Wimmer
4. #7 - Randy LaJoie
5. #98 - Elton Sawyer
6. #21 - Mike Skinner
7. #2 - Kevin Harvick
8. #10 - Jeff Green
9. #20 - Mike McLaughlin
10. #00 - Todd Bodine

Failed to qualify: none

- This was Biffle's first career Busch Series victory.

=== Subway 300 ===
The Subway 300 was held April 21 at Talladega Superspeedway. Joe Nemechek won the pole.

Top ten results

1. #20 - Mike McLaughlin*
2. #1 - Jimmy Spencer*
3. #10 - Jeff Green
4. #00 - Todd Bodine
5. #21 - Mike Skinner
6. #98 - Elton Sawyer
7. #43 - Jay Sauter
8. #37 - Kevin Grubb
9. #60 - Greg Biffle
10. #48 - Kenny Wallace

Failed to qualify: none

- This would be McLaughlin's sixth and final Busch Series victory.
- The race ended under controversy, as Jimmy Spencer accused McLaughlin of swerving his car below the yellow line to block other cars. Following the race, NASCAR instituted track limits on Talladega and Daytona in all top three series (referred to as the "yellow line rule.")

=== Auto Club 300 ===
The Auto Club 300 was held April 28 at California Speedway. Bobby Hamilton Jr. won the pole.

Top ten results

1. #36 - Hank Parker Jr.*
2. #18 - Jeff Purvis
3. #10 - Jeff Green
4. #71 - Kevin Lepage
5. #2 - Kevin Harvick
6. #60 - Greg Biffle
7. #1 - Jimmy Spencer
8. #33 - Tony Raines
9. #87 - Joe Nemechek
10. #20 - Mike McLaughlin

Failed to qualify: none

- This was Parker Jr.’s first career Busch Series victory.

=== Hardee's 250 ===
The Hardee's 250 was held May 4 at Richmond International Raceway. Matt Kenseth won the pole.

Top ten results

1. #1 - Jimmy Spencer
2. #33 - Tony Raines
3. #21 - Mike Skinner
4. #17 - Matt Kenseth
5. #2 - Kevin Harvick
6. #10 - Jeff Green
7. #23 - Scott Wimmer
8. #48 - Kenny Wallace
9. #31 - Steve Park
10. #43 - Jay Sauter

Failed to qualify: none

=== CVS Pharmacy 200 presented by Bayer ===
The CVS Pharmacy 200 presented by Bayer was held May 12 at New Hampshire International Speedway. Kevin Harvick won the pole.

Top ten results

1. #57 - Jason Keller
2. #2 - Kevin Harvick
3. #21 - Mike Skinner
4. #10 - Jeff Green
5. #48 - Kenny Wallace
6. #31 - Steve Park
7. #26 - Bobby Hamilton Jr.
8. #7 - Randy LaJoie
9. #98 - Elton Sawyer
10. #20 - Mike McLaughlin

Failed to qualify: none

=== Nazareth 200 ===
The Nazareth 200 was held May 20 at Nazareth Speedway. Tony Raines won the pole.

Top ten results

1. #60 - Greg Biffle
2. #2 - Kevin Harvick
3. #10 - Jeff Green
4. #57 - Jason Keller
5. #66 - Tim Fedewa
6. #33 - Tony Raines
7. #26 - Bobby Hamilton Jr.
8. #59 - Rich Bickle
9. #92 - Jimmie Johnson
10. #27 - Jamie McMurray

Failed to qualify: none

=== Carquest Auto Parts 300 ===
The Carquest Auto Parts 300 was held May 26 at Lowe's Motor Speedway. Kevin Harvick won the pole.

Top ten results

1. #10 - Jeff Green*
2. #17 - Matt Kenseth
3. #57 - Jason Keller
4. #00 - Todd Bodine
5. #21 - Mike Skinner
6. #60 - Greg Biffle
7. #9 - Jeff Burton
8. #1 - Jimmy Spencer
9. #34 - David Green
10. #18 - Jeff Purvis

Failed to qualify: Dan Pardus (#32), Rich Woodland Jr. (#40), Dwayne Leik (#81), Dave Blaney (#93)

- Green's victory allowed him to take the points lead from Kevin Harvick, who finished two laps down in 26th.

=== MBNA Platinum 200 ===
The MBNA Platinum 200 was held June 2 at Dover International Speedway. Jeff Green won the pole.

Top ten results

1. #1 - Jimmy Spencer
2. #17 - Matt Kenseth
3. #2 - Kevin Harvick*
4. #21 - Mike Skinner
5. #31 - Steve Park
6. #98 - Elton Sawyer
7. #23 - Scott Wimmer
8. #34 - David Green
9. #60 - Greg Biffle
10. #33 - Tony Raines

Failed to qualify: none

- Jeff Green crashed out on lap 159, allowing Kevin Harvick to retake the championship lead, and he would hold it for the rest of the season.

=== Outback Steakhouse 300 ===
The inaugural Outback Steakhouse 300 was held June 16 at Kentucky Speedway. Jay Sauter won the pole.

Top ten results

1. #2 - Kevin Harvick
2. #60 - Greg Biffle
3. #33 - Tony Raines
4. #98 - Elton Sawyer
5. #46 - Ashton Lewis
6. #74 - Chad Little
7. #7 - Randy LaJoie
8. #37 - Kevin Grubb
9. #43 - Jay Sauter
10. #27 - Jamie McMurray

Failed to qualify: Dan Pardus (#32), Jeff Falk (#8), Mike Harmon (#44)

- Travis Kvapil made his first Busch Series start in this race. On lap 184, Kvapil collided with Rich Bickle, flipping the car onto its roof. Kvapil escaped uninjured.
- After Tim Sauter crashed out on lap 169, the car's roll cage was found to have multiple holes drilled into the joints. As a result, Sauter was disqualified, the team was docked 60 driver and owner points, and crew chief Dave Fuge Sr. was fined $30,000 and indefinitely suspended. The Xpress Motorsports team was shut down in the aftermath, but Fuge Sr. would revive it later in the year, and would move to the Truck Series in 2002.

=== GNC Live Well 250 ===
The GNC Live Well 250 was held July 1 at The Milwaukee Mile. Kevin Harvick won the pole.

Top ten results

1. #60 - Greg Biffle
2. #17 - Matt Kenseth
3. #37 - Kevin Grubb
4. #2 - Kevin Harvick
5. #57 - Jason Keller
6. #98 - Elton Sawyer
7. #18 - Jeff Purvis
8. #11 - Ron Hornaday Jr.
9. #10 - Jeff Green
10. #33 - Tony Raines

Failed to qualify: none

=== GNC Live Well 200 ===
The GNC Live Well 200 was held July 8 at Watkins Glen International. Scott Pruett won the pole.

Top ten results

1. #87 - Ron Fellows
2. #60 - Greg Biffle
3. #2 - Kevin Harvick
4. #17 - Boris Said
5. #21 - Robby Gordon
6. #98 - Elton Sawyer
7. #35 - Lyndon Amick
8. #71 - Scott Pruett
9. #57 - Jason Keller
10. #11 - Ron Hornaday Jr.

Failed to qualify: none

=== Sam's Club presents the Hill Bros. Coffee 300 ===
The inaugural Sam's Club presents the Hill Bros. Coffee 300 was held July 14 at Chicagoland Speedway. Ryan Newman won the pole.

Top ten results

1. #92 - Jimmie Johnson*
2. #21 - Mike Skinner
3. #9 - Jeff Burton
4. #87 - Joe Nemechek
5. #57 - Jason Keller
6. #10 - Jeff Green
7. #00 - Buckshot Jones
8. #98 - Elton Sawyer
9. #37 - Kevin Grubb
10. #71 - Kevin Lepage

Failed to qualify: Mike Harmon (#44), Rich Woodland Jr. (#40)

- This would Johnson's first and only Busch Series victory.

=== Carquest Auto Parts 250 ===
The Carquest Auto Parts 250 was held July 21 at Gateway International Raceway. Greg Biffle won the pole.

Top ten results

1. #2 - Kevin Harvick
2. #57 - Jason Keller
3. #37 - Kevin Grubb
4. #60 - Greg Biffle
5. #10 - Jeff Green
6. #48 - Kenny Wallace
7. #37 - David Green
8. #98 - Elton Sawyer
9. #7 - Randy LaJoie
10. #23 - Scott Wimmer

Failed to qualify: Mark Voigt (#30)

=== NAPA Autocare 250 ===
The NAPA Autocare 250 was held July 28 at Pikes Peak International Raceway. Kenny Wallace won the pole.

Top ten results

1. #21 - Jeff Purvis
2. #10 - Jeff Green
3. #2 - Kevin Harvick
4. #57 - Jason Keller
5. #60 - Greg Biffle
6. #37 - David Green
7. #92 - Jimmie Johnson
8. #37 - Kevin Grubb
9. #48 - Kenny Wallace
10. #00 - Tim Fedewa

Failed to qualify: Mark Voigt (#30)

=== Kroger 200 ===
The Kroger 200 was held August 4 at Indianapolis Raceway Park. Kenny Wallace won the pole.

Top ten results

1. #2 - Kevin Harvick
2. #60 - Greg Biffle
3. #74 - Chad Little
4. #98 - Elton Sawyer
5. #57 - Jason Keller
6. #10 - Jeff Green
7. #00 - Tim Fedewa
8. #66 - Geoff Bodine
9. #59 - Rich Bickle
10. #27 - Jamie McMurray

Failed to qualify: Wayman Wittman (#93), Mardy Lindley (#89)

=== NAPAonline.com 250 ===
The NAPAonline.com 250 was held August 18 at Michigan International Speedway. Jimmy Spencer won the pole.

Top ten results

1. #02 - Ryan Newman*
2. #2 - Kevin Harvick
3. #33 - Tony Raines
4. #92 - Jimmie Johnson
5. #18 - Mike McLaughlin
6. #21 - Mike Skinner
7. #98 - Elton Sawyer
8. #57 - Jason Keller
9. #00 - Tim Fedewa
10. #9 - Jeff Burton

Failed to qualify: Dwayne Leik (#81)

- This was Newman's first career Busch Series victory, and the first series victory for Team Penske.

=== Food City 250 ===
The Food City 250 was held August 24 at Bristol Motor Speedway. Mike Skinner won the pole.

Top ten results

1. #2 - Kevin Harvick
2. #10 - Jeff Green
3. #48 - Kenny Wallace
4. #31 - Steve Park
5. #98 - Elton Sawyer
6. #23 - Scott Wimmer
7. #1 - Jimmy Spencer
8. #02 - Ryan Newman
9. #74 - Chad Little
10. #43 - Jay Sauter

Failed to qualify: Nate Monteith (#44), Randy Ratliff (#75), Ron Young (#71)

=== South Carolina 200 ===
The South Carolina 200 was held September 1 at Darlington Raceway. Ryan Newman won the pole.

Top ten results

1. #9 - Jeff Burton
2. #98 - Elton Sawyer
3. #18 - Mike McLaughlin
4. #02 - Ryan Newman
5. #26 - Bobby Hamilton Jr.
6. #57 - Jason Keller
7. #17 - Matt Kenseth
8. #1 - Jimmy Spencer
9. #10 - Jeff Green
10. #33 - Tony Raines

Failed to qualify: none

- This race was marred by a brutal freak accident on lap 19. Steve Park lost control of his car under caution after the steering wheel came loose, and was T-boned at high speed by Larry Foyt. Park suffered near-fatal injuries, and would not race again until early 2002.

=== Autolite / Fram 250 ===
The Autolite / Fram 250 was held September 7 at Richmond International Raceway. Jeff Green won the pole.

Top ten results

1. #1 - Jimmy Spencer
2. #17 - Matt Kenseth
3. #37 - Kevin Grubb
4. #66 - Geoff Bodine
5. #21 - Johnny Sauter
6. #74 - Chad Little
7. #02 - Ryan Newman
8. #98 - Elton Sawyer
9. #9 - Jeff Burton
10. #4 - Mike Wallace

Failed to qualify: Steven Christian (#94), Randy Ratliff (#75), Dion Ciccarelli (#84), A. J. Alsup (#72), Ron Young (#71), Robbie Faggart (#97), Chad Chaffin (#16), Jeff Oakley (#96), Eddie Beahr (#5)

- During the race, Greg Biffle and Jay Sauter tangled, resulting in Biffle running from his car to punch Sauter. Both drivers were given a 100-point penalty for their actions.
- Larry Foyt qualified the #14, but was replaced in the race by Mark Green, as Foyt was still recovering from his crash at Darlington.

=== MBNA.com 200 ===
The MBNA.com 200 was held September 22 at Dover International Speedway. Ryan Newman won the pole.

Top ten results

1. #10 - Jeff Green
2. #48 - Kenny Wallace
3. #1 - Jimmy Spencer
4. #74 - Chad Little
5. #60 - Greg Biffle
6. #71 - Kevin Lepage
7. #33 - Tony Raines
8. #36 - Hank Parker Jr.
9. #7 - Randy LaJoie
10. #17 - Matt Kenseth

Failed to qualify: none

=== Mr. Goodcents 300 ===
The inaugural Mr. Goodcents 300 was held September 29 at Kansas Speedway. Kevin Lepage won the pole.

Top ten results

1. #10 - Jeff Green
2. #36 - Hank Parker Jr.
3. #60 - Greg Biffle
4. #17 - Matt Kenseth
5. #57 - Jason Keller
6. #92 - Jimmie Johnson
7. #33 - Tony Raines
8. #00 - Buckshot Jones
9. #59 - Mark Green
10. #18 - Mike McLaughlin

Failed to qualify: Mike Swaim Jr. (#12), Jason Rudd (#85), A. J. Alsup (#72)

=== Little Trees 300 ===
The Little Trees 300 was held October 6 at Lowe's Motor Speedway. Jeff Burton won the pole.

Top ten results

1. #60 - Greg Biffle
2. #57 - Jason Keller
3. #9 - Jeff Burton
4. #2 - Kevin Harvick
5. #46 - Ashton Lewis
6. #1 - Jimmy Spencer
7. #36 - Hank Parker Jr.
8. #5 - Ward Burton
9. #98 - Elton Sawyer
10. #10 - Jeff Green

Failed to qualify: Jeff Fultz (#86), Dwayne Leik (#81), Jason Rudd (#85), J. R. Robbs (#89), Josh Richeson (#6)

=== Sam's Town 250 ===
The Sam's Town 250 was held October 13 at Memphis Motorsports Park. Kevin Harvick won the pole.

Top ten results

1. #7 - Randy LaJoie*
2. #10 - Jeff Green
3. #2 - Kevin Harvick
4. #43 - Jay Sauter
5. #59 - Jeff Purvis
6. #11 - Tim Fedewa
7. #57 - Jason Keller
8. #23 - Scott Wimmer
9. #46 - Ashton Lewis
10. #18 - Mike McLaughlin

Failed to qualify: Sammy Ragan (#78)

- This was LaJoie's final Busch Series victory.
- The race was supposed to be tape delayed and shown on TNT after the Cup race, but due to rain that also delayed the Winston Cup race at Martinsville, NBC showed this race live instead.

=== Outback Steakhouse 200 ===
The Outback Steakhouse 200 was held October 27 at Phoenix International Raceway. Jimmy Spencer won the pole.

Top ten results

1. #60 - Greg Biffle
2. #10 - Jeff Green
3. #2 - Kevin Harvick
4. #43 - Ron Hornaday Jr.
5. #92 - Todd Bodine
6. #57 - Jason Keller
7. #23 - Scott Wimmer
8. #36 - Hank Parker Jr.
9. #9 - Jeff Burton
10. #48 - Kenny Wallace

Failed to qualify: Lance Hooper (#75), Damon Lusk (#80)

=== Sam's Club 200 ===
The Sam's Club 200 was held November 3 at North Carolina Speedway. Ryan Newman won the pole.

Top ten results

1. #48 - Kenny Wallace*
2. #17 - Matt Kenseth
3. #18 - Mike McLaughlin
4. #57 - Jason Keller
5. #2 - Kevin Harvick*
6. #34 - David Green
7. #02 - Ryan Newman
8. #36 - Hank Parker Jr.
9. #10 - Jeff Green
10. #98 - Elton Sawyer 1 lap down

Failed to qualify: Scott Hansen (#75), Drew White (#22)

- Harvick's fifth-place finish was good enough to clinch the 2001 Busch Series championship by 156 points over Jeff Green.
- This was Wallace's final Busch Series victory.

=== GNC Live Well 300 ===
The GNC Live Well 300 was held November 10 at Homestead-Miami Speedway. Jeff Green won the pole.

Top ten results

1. #87 - Joe Nemechek
2. #98 - Elton Sawyer
3. #60 - Greg Biffle
4. #23 - Scott Wimmer
5. #17 - Matt Kenseth
6. #99 - Michael Waltrip
7. #5 - Ward Burton
8. #02 - Ryan Newman
9. #10 - Jeff Green
10. #59 - Stacy Compton

Failed to qualify: Morgan Shepherd (#89), Tim Fedewa (#12), Martin Truex Jr. (#56), Dan Pardus (#32), Jeff Fultz (#86), Ron Young (#71), Tom Carey Jr. (#01), Mike Harmon (#44), Michael Dokken (#8), Dion Ciccarelli (#84), Brian Tyler (#94), Danny Bagwell (#22)

== Results and standings ==
=== Race results ===
| No. | Race | Pole position | Most laps led | Winning driver | Manufacturer | No. | Team |
|---|---|---|---|---|---|---|---|
| 1 | NAPA Auto Parts 300 | Joe Nemechek | Jeff Purvis | Randy LaJoie | Pontiac | 7 | Evans Motorsports |
| 2 | Alltel 200 | Greg Biffle | Todd Bodine | Todd Bodine | Chevrolet | 00 | Buckshot Racing |
| 3 | Sam's Town 300 | Matt Kenseth | Todd Bodine | Todd Bodine | Chevrolet | 00 | Buckshot Racing |
| 4 | Aaron's 312 | Ryan Newman | Joe Nemechek | Joe Nemechek | Chevrolet | 87 | NEMCO Motorsports |
| 5 | SunCom 200 | Ryan Newman | Matt Kenseth | Jeff Green | Ford | 10 | ppc Racing |
| 6 | Cheez-It 250 | Kevin Harvick | Kevin Harvick | Matt Kenseth | Ford | 17 | Reiser Enterprises |
| 7 | Jani-King 300 | Matt Kenseth | Kevin Harvick | Kevin Harvick | Chevrolet | 2 | Richard Childress Racing |
| 8 | Pepsi 300 | Kevin Harvick | Greg Biffle | Greg Biffle | Ford | 60 | Roush Racing |
| 9 | Subway 300 | Joe Nemechek | Jimmy Spencer | Mike McLaughlin | Pontiac | 20 | Joe Gibbs Racing |
| 10 | Auto Club 300 | Bobby Hamilton Jr. | Greg Biffle | Hank Parker Jr. | Chevrolet | 36 | Cicci-Welliver Racing |
| 11 | Hardee's 250 | Matt Kenseth | Jimmy Spencer | Jimmy Spencer | Chevrolet | 1 | Phoenix Racing |
| 12 | CVS Pharmacy 200 Presented by Bayer | Kevin Harvick | Kevin Harvick | Jason Keller | Ford | 57 | ppc Racing |
| 13 | Nazareth 200 | Tony Raines | Kevin Harvick | Greg Biffle | Ford | 60 | Roush Racing |
| 14 | Carquest Auto Parts 300 | Kevin Harvick | Greg Biffle | Jeff Green | Ford | 10 | ppc Racing |
| 15 | MBNA Platinum 200 | Jeff Green | Kevin Harvick | Jimmy Spencer | Chevrolet | 1 | Phoenix Racing |
| 16 | Outback Steakhouse 300 | Jay Sauter | Kevin Harvick | Kevin Harvick | Chevrolet | 2 | Richard Childress Racing |
| 17 | GNC Live Well 250 | Kevin Harvick | Kevin Harvick | Greg Biffle | Ford | 60 | Roush Racing |
| 18 | GNC Live Well 200 | Scott Pruett | Ron Fellows | Ron Fellows | Chevrolet | 87 | NEMCO Motorsports |
| 19 | Sam's Club Presents the Hills Bros. Coffee 300 | Ryan Newman | Ryan Newman | Jimmie Johnson | Chevrolet | 92 | Herzog Motorsports |
| 20 | Carquest Auto Parts 250 | Greg Biffle | Kevin Harvick | Kevin Harvick | Chevrolet | 2 | Richard Childress Racing |
| 21 | NAPA Autocare 250 | Kenny Wallace | Jeff Purvis | Jeff Purvis | Chevrolet | 21 | Richard Childress Racing |
| 22 | Kroger 200 | Kenny Wallace | Greg Biffle | Kevin Harvick | Chevrolet | 2 | Richard Childress Racing |
| 23 | NAPAonline.com 250 | Jimmy Spencer | Ryan Newman | Ryan Newman | Ford | 02 | Penske Racing South |
| 24 | Food City 250 | Mike Skinner | Kevin Harvick | Kevin Harvick | Chevrolet | 2 | Richard Childress Racing |
| 25 | South Carolina 200 | Ryan Newman | Jeff Burton | Jeff Burton | Ford | 9 | Roush Racing |
| 26 | Autolite / Fram 250 | Jeff Green | Jimmy Spencer | Jimmy Spencer | Chevrolet | 1 | Phoenix Racing |
| 27 | MBNA.com 200 | Ryan Newman | Ryan Newman | Jeff Green | Ford | 10 | ppc Racing |
| 28 | Mr. Goodcents 300 | Kevin Lepage | Kevin Lepage | Jeff Green | Ford | 10 | ppc Racing |
| 29 | Little Trees 300 | Jeff Burton | Matt Kenseth | Greg Biffle | Ford | 60 | Roush Racing |
| 30 | Sam's Town 250 | Kevin Harvick | Jeff Green | Randy LaJoie | Chevrolet | 7 | Evans Motorsports |
| 31 | Outback Steakhouse 200 | Jimmy Spencer | Greg Biffle | Greg Biffle | Ford | 60 | Roush Racing |
| 32 | Sam's Club 200 | Ryan Newman | Jeff Green | Kenny Wallace | Chevrolet | 48 | Innovative Motorsports |
| 33 | GNC Live Well 300 | Jeff Green | Kevin Harvick | Joe Nemechek | Chevrolet | 87 | NEMCO Motorsports |

=== Drivers' Championship ===
(key) Bold – Pole position awarded by time. Italics – Pole position set by owner's points. * – Most laps led.

| Pos | Driver | DAY | CAR | LVS | ATL | DAR | BRI | TEX | NSH | TAL | CAL | RCH | NHA | NAZ | CLT | DOV | KEN | MIL | GLN | CHI | GTY | PPR | IRP | MCH | BRI | DAR | RCH | DOV | KAN | CLT | MEM | PHO | CAR | HOM | Pts |
|---|---|---|---|---|---|---|---|---|---|---|---|---|---|---|---|---|---|---|---|---|---|---|---|---|---|---|---|---|---|---|---|---|---|---|---|
| 1 | Kevin Harvick | 2 | 2 | 12 | 8 | 8 | **7*** | 1* | 7 | 40 | 5 | 5 | **2*** | 2* | 26 | 3* | 1* | **4*** | 3 | 27 | 1* | 3 | 1 | 2 | 1* | 14 | 27 | 14 | 38 | 4 | 3 | 3 | 5 | 37* | 4813 |
| 2 | Jeff Green | 4 | 8 | 5 | 4 | 1 | 38 | 32 | 8 | 3 | 3 | 6 | 4 | 3 | 1 | 29 | 31 | 9 | 31 | 6 | 5 | 2 | 6 | 36 | 2 | 9 | **22** | 1 | 1 | 10 | 2* | 2 | 9* | 9 | 4689 |
| 3 | Jason Keller | 7 | 10 | 3 | 7 | 3 | 11 | 24 | 2 | 25 | 15 | 18 | 1 | 4 | 3 | 13 | 14 | 5 | 9 | 5 | 2 | 4 | 5 | 8 | 29 | 6 | 13 | 25 | 5 | 2 | 7 | 6 | 4 | 19 | 4642 |
| 4 | Greg Biffle **(R)** | 22 | **3** | 2 | 2 | 11 | 30 | 7 | 1* | 9 | 6* | 37 | 11 | 1 | 6* | 9 | 2 | 1 | 2 | 39 | **4** | 5 | 2* | 43 | 18 | 15 | 35 | 5 | 3 | 1 | 20 | 1* | 12 | 3 | 4509 |
| 5 | Elton Sawyer | 43 | 29 | 8 | 35 | 9 | 17 | 21 | 5 | 6 | 12 | 40 | 9 | 11 | 19 | 6 | 4 | 6 | 6 | 8 | 8 | 30 | 4 | 7 | 5 | 2 | 8 | 11 | 16 | 9 | 26 | 38 | 10 | 2 | 4100 |
| 6 | Tony Raines | 36 | 38 | 4 | 10 | 22 | 8 | 20 | 16 | 14 | 8 | 2 | 12 | **6** | 24 | 10 | 3 | 10 | 27 | 11 | 23 | 19 | 12 | 3 | 17 | 10 | 21 | 7 | 7 | 14 | 31 | 16 | 22 | 14 | 3975 |
| 7 | Mike McLaughlin | 6 | 14 | 9 | 11 | 5 | 13 | 37 | 9 | 1 | 10 | 22 | 10 | 17 | 11 | 21 | 25 | 18 | 17 | 25 | 12 | 14 | 23 | 5 | 16 | 3 | 32 | 31 | 10 | 19 | 10 | 31 | 3 | 12 | 3962 |
| 8 | Jimmie Johnson | 5 | 13 | 14 | 9 | 32 | 4 | 8 | 28 | 28 | 16 | 12 | 13 | 9 | 16 | 25 | 30 | 26 | 21 | 1 | 14 | 7 | 15 | 4 | 12 | 16 | 19 | 33 | 6 | 22 | 14 | 21 | 23 | 17 | 3871 |
| 9 | Chad Little | 9 | 15 | 16 | 15 | 24 | 12 | 31 | 27 | 11 | 18 | 20 | 14 | 20 | 21 | 11 | 6 | 20 | 16 | 17 | 13 | 16 | 3 | 16 | 9 | 13 | 6 | 4 | 36 | 17 | 16 | 13 | 17 | 27 | 3846 |
| 10 | Kenny Wallace | 8 | 4 | 24 | 19 | 4 | 5 | 43 | 36 | 10 | 38 | 8 | 5 | 32 | 30 | 12 | 35 | 16 | 11 | 14 | 6 | **9** | **11** | 22 | 3 | 18 | 23 | 2 | 25 | 32 | 21 | 10 | 1 | 25 | 3799 |
| 11 | Scott Wimmer **(R)** | 15 | 31 | 11 | 14 | 12 | 29 | 15 | 3 | 42 | 19 | 7 | 17 | 30 | 35 | 7 | 17 | 30 | 23 | 13 | 10 | 20 | 31 | 23 | 6 | 12 | 15 | 12 | 17 | 11 | 8 | 7 | 13 | 4 | 3773 |
| 12 | Randy LaJoie | 1 | 32 | 38 | 21 | 26 | 3 | 13 | 4 | 27 | 30 | 19 | 8 | 13 | 22 | 24 | 7 | 22 | 19 | 19 | 9 | 33 | 13 | 24 | 31 | 19 | 34 | 9 | 21 | 37 | 1 | 18 | 11 | 21 | 3578 |
| 13 | David Green | 23 | 28 | 40 | 18 | 31 | 15 | 6 | 24 | 32 | 13 | 13 | 23 | 16 | 9 | 8 | 23 | 15 | 35 | 15 | 7 | 6 | 18 | 37 | 15 | 22 | 12 | 15 | 13 | 21 | 33 | 15 | 6 | 11 | 3554 |
| 14 | Kevin Grubb | 39 | 12 | 19 | 25 | 21 | 35 | 18 | 34 | 8 | 26 | 15 | 20 | 18 | 33 | 33 | 8 | 3 | 13 | 9 | 3 | 8 | 22 | 13 | 13 | 32 | 3 | 20 | 22 | 20 | 28 | 23 | 15 | 29 | 3533 |
| 15 | Hank Parker Jr. | 14 | 17 | 22 | 38 | 25 | 21 | 29 | 25 | 41 | 1 | 11 | 18 | 39 | 15 | 30 | 11 | 14 | 32 | 35 | 26 | 22 | 25 | 28 | 34 | 17 | 28 | 8 | 2 | 7 | 32 | 8 | 8 | 20 | 3341 |
| 16 | Jamie McMurray **(R)** | 11 | 26 | 20 | 24 | 14 | 25 | 16 | 19 | 29 | 37 | 26 | 31 | 10 | 25 | 19 | 10 | 19 | 14 | 20 | 11 | 12 | 10 | 17 | 42 | 23 | 14 | 17 | 19 | 31 | 11 | 33 | 16 | 42 | 3308 |
| 17 | Bobby Hamilton Jr. | 33 | 5 | 37 | 36 | 6 | 23 | 19 | 26 | 23 | **14** | 24 | 7 | 7 | 14 | 28 | 12 | 34 | 29 | 41 | 18 | 15 | 19 | 21 | 32 | 5 | 33 | 13 | 34 | 12 | 15 | 36 | 21 | 26 | 3267 |
| 18 | Matt Kenseth | 3 | | **34** | 30 | 2* | 1 | **5** | | 21 | 20 | **4** | | | 2 | 2 | | 2 | | 30 | | | | 12 | 30 | 7 | 2 | 10 | 4 | 16* | | 22 | 2 | 5 | 3167 |
| 19 | Jay Sauter | 25 | 11 | 10 | 13 | 36 | 22 | 3 | 39 | 7 | 28 | 10 | 32 | 15 | 34 | 23 | **9** | 33 | 12 | 38 | 25 | 17 | 14 | 15 | 10 | 30 | 39 | 18 | 14 | 28 | 4 | | | 22 | 3084 |
| 20 | Ashton Lewis | 31 | 33 | 30 | 39 | 19 | 27 | 11 | 42 | 31 | 22 | 32 | 29 | 14 | 13 | 40 | 5 | 32 | 37 | 43 | Wth | 11 | 16 | 20 | 19 | 26 | 37 | 16 | 20 | 5 | 9 | 24 | 27 | 16 | 2904 |
| 21 | Jeff Purvis | 28* | 6 | 17 | 6 | 10 | 24 | 12 | 14 | 24 | 2 | 17 | 19 | 12 | 10 | 14 | 29 | 7 | | | 15 | 1* | 21 | | | | | | | | 5 | 17 | 14 | | 2863 |
| 22 | Larry Foyt **(R)** | 19 | 24 | 31 | 22 | 30 | 33 | 22 | 29 | 12 | 21 | 27 | 28 | 26 | 28 | 41 | 19 | 23 | 30 | 22 | 32 | 34 | 27 | 18 | 33 | 39 | QL | 23 | 30 | 24 | 17 | 34 | 29 | 24 | 2673 |
| 23 | Shane Hall | 12 | 25 | 29 | 28 | 23 | 36 | 38 | 30 | 34 | 33 | 30 | 24 | 21 | 41 | 27 | 22 | 24 | 26 | 31 | 22 | 31 | 24 | 35 | 25 | 28 | 26 | 29 | 29 | 34 | 19 | 19 | 34 | 31 | 2624 |
| 24 | Rich Bickle | 16 | 7 | 15 | 29 | 15 | 39 | 23 | 12 | 13 | 29 | 16 | 21 | 8 | 17 | 26 | 27 | 12 | 22 | 28 | | | 9 | 29 | 20 | 25 | 16 | 24 | | | | | | | 2595 |
| 25 | Tim Fedewa | 24 | 30 | 28 | 31 | 18 | 2 | 26 | 18 | 18 | 11 | 21 | 25 | 5 | 27 | 31 | 36 | 31 | | | 40 | 10 | 7 | 9 | 41 | | | | | 27 | 6 | 26 | | DNQ | 2403 |
| 26 | Jimmy Spencer | | | | | 13 | 26 | 30 | | 2* | 7 | 1* | | | 8 | 1 | | | | 18 | | | | **31** | 7 | 8 | 1* | 3 | 18 | 6 | | **35** | | 36 | 2329 |
| 27 | Mike Skinner | | | | | | | 9 | 6 | 5 | 23 | 3 | 3 | | 5 | 4 | | 11 | | 2 | | | | 6 | **11** | 24 | | 19 | | | | | | | 1999 |
| 28 | Ryan Newman | | 9 | | **32** | **17** | 6 | 14 | | | | 14 | 15 | | | | | | | **26*** | | | | 1* | 8 | **4** | 7 | **21*** | | | | | **7** | 8 | 1978 |
| 29 | Todd Bodine | 38 | 1* | 1* | 5 | 34 | 19 | 35 | 10 | 4 | 17 | 35 | | | 4 | | | | | | | | | | | | | | | 15 | | 5 | 24 | 15 | 1915 |
| 30 | Kelly Denton | 18 | 27 | 26 | 37 | 33 | 18 | 28 | | | 34 | 41 | | 24 | 42 | 16 | 13 | 13 | 25 | 40 | 21 | 25 | | 38 | 37 | 27 | 42 | 30 | | | | | 28 | | 1863 |
| 31 | Kevin Lepage | | | 21 | 40 | 27 | | 10 | 15 | | 4 | 28 | 35 | | 12 | 15 | | | | 10 | | | | 42 | 28 | | | 6 | **12*** | | | 14 | | | 1687 |
| 32 | Tim Sauter **(R)** | 10 | 21 | 13 | 34 | 29 | 9 | 34 | 17 | 15 | 25 | 23 | 16 | 22 | 23 | 22 | 43 | | | | | | | | | | | | | | | | 26 | 40 | 1611 |
| 33 | Jeff Burton | | | 6 | | | | 2 | | | | | | | 7 | | | | | 3 | | | | 10 | | 1* | 9 | | 31 | **3** | | 9 | | 13 | 1600 |
| 34 | Geoff Bodine | | | | | | | | | | | | | | | | 41 | 17 | 20 | 23 | 19 | 18 | 8 | 40 | 14 | 34 | 4 | 22 | 26 | 33 | 35 | 30 | 18 | | 1582 |
| 35 | Joe Nemechek | 32 | | 7 | 1* | | | 4 | | **39** | 9 | | | | | | | | | 4 | | | | | | | 17 | 37 | 35 | 26 | | 12 | | 1 | 1541 |
| 36 | Ron Hornaday Jr. | | | | | | | | | | | | | | | | | 8 | 10 | 16 | | | | 14 | 27 | 11 | 11 | 36 | 24 | | | 4 | 20 | 30 | 1346 |
| 37 | Marty Houston **(R)** | 13 | 42 | 36 | 33 | 20 | 14 | 25 | 23 | 37 | 32 | 38 | 30 | 25 | 32 | 17 | 21 | | | | | | | | | | | | | | | | | | 1294 |
| 38 | Brad Baker | 35 | 34 | 35 | 23 | Wth | 28 | | 13 | 20 | | 25 | | | 36 | | 18 | 27 | | | | 26 | 37 | | 23 | | 43 | | | | 23 | | | | 1270 |
| 39 | Christian Elder | DNQ | | 23 | 26 | | 20 | | | 26 | 24 | | | 28 | 37 | 20 | 24 | | | 29 | 30 | | | | 35 | | | | 27 | 40 | | 28 | | 43 | 1228 |
| 40 | Mark Green | 20 | 20 | 32 | 41 | 16 | 40 | 41 | 21 | 17 | | | 38 | | | | 16 | | | 24 | | | | | | | 36 | | 9 | 29 | | | | | 1198 |
| 41 | Michael Waltrip | 37 | | 39 | 3 | | 10 | | | | | | | | 43 | | | | | 12 | | | | | 40 | | 18 | | 15 | 18 | | 20 | | 6 | 1195 |
| 42 | Chad Chaffin | 41 | 22 | 25 | 16 | 37 | 34 | 27 | | | | | | | | | | | | | 28 | 38 | 20 | | 38 | | DNQ | | 33 | | 22 | | 41 | | 967 |
| 43 | David Donohue **(R)** | | | | | | | | 32 | 33 | 27 | 36 | 33 | 27 | 20 | 32 | 32 | 21 | 15 | 34 | | | | | | | | | | | | | | | 935 |
| 44 | Andy Santerre | | 23 | | | | 31 | | 33 | | | | 27 | | | | | | 18 | | 16 | 13 | 17 | | | | | | 32 | | | 42 | | 38 | 928 |
| 45 | Randy Tolsma | | | | | | | | | | | | | | | | | | | | | 23 | 33 | 33 | 22 | 29 | 38 | 26 | 40 | 25 | 18 | 25 | 32 | | 924 |
| 46 | Steve Park | | | | | 7 | | | | | | 9 | 6 | | | 5 | | | | 42 | | | | | 4 | 38 | | | | | | | | | 840 |
| 47 | Brad Teague | | | | 43 | 40 | 32 | | | | | | | 34 | 40 | 35 | 40 | 39 | 38 | | 37 | | 38 | | 36 | 40 | | 41 | | | 43 | | 42 | | 754 |
| 48 | Buckshot Jones | | | | | | | | | | | | | | | 18 | | | | 7 | | | | | | | | | 8 | 13 | | | 19 | 18 | 736 |
| 49 | Clay Rogers | | 18 | | | | | | 37 | | | | 37 | 23 | | | 39 | | | | 34 | 35 | 30 | | QL | | | | | | 12 | | | | 677 |
| 50 | Mike Wallace | | | | | | | | | | 31 | | | | 31 | | | | | 32 | | | | 27 | | | 10 | | 23 | Wth | | 37 | | 23 | 663 |
| 51 | Mike Harmon | | | | | | | DNQ | 40 | 35 | | | | 38 | | 38 | DNQ | | | DNQ | 33 | 40 | 28 | 41 | | 35 | | 42 | | 43 | 40 | 41 | 38 | DNQ | 660 |
| 52 | Robbie Faggart | | 35 | | | | | 42 | | | 35 | | 34 | 31 | 38 | | | 28 | | 33 | 36 | 37 | | | | | DNQ | | | 38 | | | | | 632 |
| 53 | Steadman Marlin | | | | | | | | 22 | | | | | | 39 | | 26 | | | 21 | | | | 19 | 26 | | | | 39 | | 42 | | | | 602 |
| 54 | Blaise Alexander | 30 | 16 | 43 | 12 | | | | | | | | | | | | | | | | | | | 11 | | | | 28 | | | | | | | 558 |
| 55 | Johnny Sauter | | | | | | | | | | | | | | | | | | | | | | | | | | 5 | | | | 13 | 11 | 30 | 35 | 545 |
| 56 | Mike Dillon | 29 | 19 | 18 | 20 | 28 | 37 | | | | | | | | | | | | | | | | | | | | | | | | | | | | 525 |
| 57 | Lyndon Amick | 21 | | | | | | | | | 30 | | 43 | | | | | | 7 | | | | | | | 21 | 41 | | | | | | | | 493 |
| 58 | Ken Alexander | | | | | | | | | | | | | | | | | | | | | | | | 43 | | 30 | 32 | 37 | 41 | 30 | 32 | 36 | | 461 |
| 59 | Andy Kirby | DNQ | | | | | | | | 16 | | | | | | | | | | | | | | 30 | | 33 | | | 41 | | 41 | | | 32 | 399 |
| 60 | Robby Gordon | | | | | | | | | | | | | | | | | | 5 | | | | | | | | | | 11 | 23 | | | | | 389 |
| 61 | Dan Pardus | | | | | | | | 35 | | | | | | DNQ | | DNQ | | | 36 | | | | | | 31 | | | | 36 | | 29 | 31 | DNQ | 384 |
| 62 | Bill Hoff | | 41 | | | | | | | | | | | 37 | | 39 | Wth | 35 | 33 | | 42 | | 40 | | | | | 43 | | | | | 43 | | 374 |
| 63 | Brian Tyler | | | 33 | | | | | | | | | | | | | | | | | | | 26 | 39 | | | | | | | 24 | | 35 | DNQ | 344 |
| 64 | Jason Rudd | | 40 | | | | | | | | | 34 | | | | 34 | | | | | | | | | | | 31 | 40 | DNQ | DNQ | | | 33 | | 342 |
| 65 | P. J. Jones | 27 | 37 | 27 | 17 | | | | | | | | | | | | | | | | | | | | | | | | | | | | | | 328 |
| 66 | Drew White | | | | | | | | | | | | | 40 | | | | | 36 | | 38 | 39 | 42 | | | 37 | | | | | 39 | | DNQ | | 328 |
| 67 | Jeff Falk | | | | | | | | | | | 31 | | 29 | | | DNQ | | | | | | | | 24 | | 25 | | | | | | | | 325 |
| 68 | David Starr | 34 | | | 27 | | | 17 | | 38 | | | | | | | | | | | | | | | | | | | | | | | | | 304 |
| 69 | Bobby Gerhart | | | | | | | 40 | | 22 | | | 26 | 33 | | | | | | | | | | | | | | | | | | | | | 289 |
| 70 | Ward Burton | | | | | | | | | | | | | | | | | | | | | | | | | | | | | 8 | | | | 7 | 288 |
| 71 | Derrike Cope | | | | | | | | | | | | | | | | Wth | | | 37 | 31 | | | 34 | 21 | | | | | | | | | | 283 |
| 72 | Brian Vickers | | | | | | | | | | | | | | | | | 37 | | | | | 32 | | | | 29 | | | | | | | 25 | 283 |
| 73 | Kerry Earnhardt | | | | | | | | | | | | | | | | 20 | | | | | 24 | | 26 | | | | | | | | | | | 279 |
| 74 | Stanton Barrett | | | | | | | | | | 39 | | | | | | | | | | | | | | | 20 | | 27 | 28 | 39 | 38 | | | | 277 |
| 75 | Ricky Hendrick | | | | | | | | | | | | | | 18 | | 15 | | | | | | | | | | | | | | | | | 41 | 267 |
| 76 | A. J. Alsup | | | | | | | | | | | | | 41 | | | 42 | | | | | 29 | | 32 | | | DNQ | | DNQ | | | | | 33 | 244 |
| 77 | Joe Bessey | 17 | | | | | | | | 43 | | | 22 | | | | | | | | | | | | | | | | | | | | | | 243 |
| 78 | Joe Ruttman | | | | | | | | | | | | | | | | 33 | 38 | | | | 21 | | | | | | | | | | | | | 213 |
| 79 | Joe Bush | | | | | | | | | | | 33 | | | | | | 29 | | | | 32 | | | | | | | | | | | | | 207 |
| 80 | Kertus Davis | | | | | | | | | | | | | 35 | | 42 | | 40 | | | | | | | | | | 34 | | | | | | | 199 |
| 81 | Mike Swaim Jr. | | | | | | | | | | | | | | | | | | | | 20 | | | 25 | | | | | DNQ | | | | | | 191 |
| 82 | Shawna Robinson | | | | | | | 39 | 43 | 19 | | | | | | | | | | | | | | | | | | | | | | | | | 186 |
| 83 | Joe Cooksey | | | | | | | | | | | | | | | | | | | | 29 | | 43 | | | | | | | | 29 | | | | 186 |
| 84 | Ron Fellows | | | | | | | | | | | | | | | | | | 1* | | | | | | | | | | | | | | | | 185 |
| 85 | Philip Morris | | | | | | | | | | | | | | | | | | | | | | | | | | | | | 30 | | | 40 | 34 | 177 |
| 86 | Ron Young | | | | | 38 | 42 | | | | | | | | | | | | | | | | | | DNQ | | DNQ | | | | 25 | | | DNQ | 174 |
| 87 | Stevie Hodgson | | | | | | 16 | | | | | | 36 | | | | | | | | | | | | | | | | | | | | | | 170 |
| 88 | Jeff Streeter | | | | | | | | 41 | | 36 | | | | | 37 | | | | | | | 29 | | | | | | | | | | | | 168 |
| 89 | Mike Chase | | | | | | | | | | 43 | | | | | | | | | | 27 | 28 | | | | | | | | | | | | | 161 |
| 90 | Boris Said | | | | | | | | | | | | | | | | | | 4 | | | | | | | | | | | | | | | | 160 |
| 91 | Mark Voigt | | | | | | | | | | | | | | | | | | | | DNQ | DNQ | | | | 36 | | | | | 34 | 43 | | | 150 |
| 92 | Scott Pruett | | | | | | | | | | | | | | | | | | **8** | | | | | | | | | | | | | | | | 147 |
| 93 | Bobby Hamilton | 42 | | | | | | | 20 | | | | | | | | | | | | | | | | | | | | | | | | | | 140 |
| 94 | Frank Kimmel | | | | | | | | 11 | | | | | | | | | | | | | | | | | | | | | | | | | | 135 |
| 95 | Sammy Sanders | | 36 | 41 | | | 41 | | | | | | | | | | | | | | | | | | | | | | | | | | | | 135 |
| 96 | Stacy Compton | | | | | | | | | | | | | | | | | | | | | | | | | | | | | | | | | 10 | 134 |
| 97 | Eddie Beahr | | | | | | | | | | | 42 | | | | | | | | | 24 | | | | | | DNQ | | | | | | | | 128 |
| 98 | Mark Day | | | | | | | 36 | 31 | | | | | | | | | | | | | | | | | | | | | | | | | | 125 |
| 99 | Nate Monteith | | | | | | | | | | | | | 36 | | | | | | | | | 34 | | DNQ | | | | | | | | | | 116 |
| 100 | Michael Dokken | | | | | | | | | | | | | | | | | | | | | 41 | | | | 42 | | | | 42 | | | | DNQ | 114 |
| 101 | Andy Houston | | | | | | | | | | | | | | | | | | | | 17 | | | | | | | | | | | | | | 112 |
| 102 | Ted Christopher | | | | | | | | | | | | | 19 | | | | | | | | | | | | | | | | | | | | | 106 |
| 103 | Mark McFarland | | | | | | | | | | | | | | | | | | | | | | | | | | 20 | | | | | | | | 103 |
| 104 | Jason Schuler | | | | | | | | | | | | | | | | | | | | 41 | 36 | | | | | | | | | | | | | 95 |
| 105 | Josh Richeson | | | | | | | | | | | | | | | | | | | | | | | | | | 40 | | | DNQ | | | 37 | | 95 |
| 106 | A. J. Frank | | | | | 39 | | | 38 | | | | | | | | | | | | | | | | | | | | | | | | | | 95 |
| 107 | John Finger | | | | | | | | | | | | | | | | | | 24 | | | | | | | | | | | | | | | | 91 |
| 108 | Shane Huffman | | | | | | | | | | | | | | | | | | | | | | | | | | 24 | | | | | | | | 91 |
| 109 | Billy Parker | | | | | | | | | | | | | | | | | 25 | | | | | 35 | | | | | | | | | | | | 88 |
| 110 | Rick Markle | | | | | | | | | | | | | | | | | | | | | | | | | | | 39 | 42 | | | | | | 83 |
| 111 | Jerry Robertson | | | | | | | | | | | | | | | | | | | | | 27 | | | | | | | | | | | | | 82 |
| 112 | Clay Dale | | | | | | | | | | | | | | | | | | | | | | | | | | | | | | 27 | | | | 82 |
| 113 | Bobby Dotter | | | | | | | | | | | | | | | | | | | | | | | | | | | | | | | 27 | | | 82 |
| 114 | Tom Hubert | | | | | | | | | | | | | | | | | | 28 | | | | | | | | | | | 35 | | | | | 79 |
| 115 | Travis Kvapil | | | | | | | | | | | | | | | | 28 | | | | | | | | | | | | | | | | | | 79 |
| 116 | Casey Mears | | | | | | | | | | | | | | | | | | | | | | | | | | | | | | | | | 28 | 79 |
| 117 | Sean Studer | | 39 | | | | | | | | | 29 | | | | | | | | | | | | | | | | | | | | | | | 76 |
| 118 | Dale Earnhardt Jr. | | | | | | | | | | | | | | 29 | | | | | | | | | | | | | | | | | | | | 76 |
| 119 | Scott Gaylord | | | 42 | | | | | | | | | | | | | | | | | | 42 | | | | | | | | | | | | | 74 |
| 120 | Andy Hillenburg | | | | | | | 33 | | | | | | | | | | | | | | | | | | | | | | | | | | | 64 |
| 121 | Phil Parsons | QL | | | | | | | | | | | | | | | 34 | | | | | | | | | | | | | | | | | | 61 |
| 122 | Joe Varde | | | | | | | | | | | | | | | | | | 34 | | | | | | | | | | | | | | | | 61 |
| 123 | Gus Wasson | | | | | 35 | | | | | | | | | | | | | | | | | | | | | | | | | | | | | 58 |
| 124 | Dwayne Leik | | | | | | | | | | | | | | DNQ | | Wth | | | | 35 | | | DNQ | | | | | | DNQ | | | | | 58 |
| 125 | Dion Ciccarelli | | | | | | | | | | | | | | | | | | | | | | | | | | DNQ | 35 | | | | | | DNQ | 58 |
| 126 | C. W. Smith | | | | | | | | | 36 | | | | | | | | | | | | | | | | | | | | | | | | | 55 |
| 127 | Phil Bonifield | | | | | | | | | | | | | | | 36 | | | | | | | | | | | | | | | | | | | 55 |
| 128 | Jeff Oakley | | | | | | | | | | | | | | | | | | | | | | 36 | | | | DNQ | | | | | | | | 55 |
| 129 | Mario Hernandez | | | | | | | | | | | | | | | | | | | | | | | | | | | | | | 36 | | | | 55 |
| 130 | Ronnie Hornaday | | | | | | | | | | | | | | | | | 37 | | | | | | | | | | | | | | | | | 52 |
| 131 | Scott Hansen | | | | | | | | | | | | | | | | | | | | | | | | | | | | | | 37 | | DNQ | | 52 |
| 132 | Dick Trickle | | | | | | | | | | | | | | | | 38 | | | | | | | | | | | | | | | | | | 49 |
| 133 | Martin Truex Jr. | | | | | | | | | | | | | | | | | | | | | | | | | | | 38 | | | | | | DNQ | 49 |
| 134 | Lance Hooper | | | | | | | | | | | | | | | | | 41 | | | | | | | 39 | | | | | | | DNQ | | | 46 |
| 135 | Rodney Sawyers | | | | | | | | | | | | | | | | | | | | 43 | | 39 | | | | | | | | | | | | 46 |
| 136 | Hal Goodson | | | | | | | | | | | 39 | | | | | | | | | | | | | | | | | | | | | | | 46 |
| 137 | Brian Weber | | | | | | | | | | | | | | | | | | 39 | | | | | | | | | | | | | | | | 46 |
| 138 | Eric Jones | | | | | | | | | | | | | | | | | | | | 39 | | | | | | | | | | | | | | 46 |
| 139 | Ken Schrader | | | | | | | | | | | | | | | | | | | | | | | | | | | | | | | 39 | | | 46 |
| 140 | Jeff Fultz | | | | | | | | | | | | | | | | | | | | | | | | | | | | | DNQ | | | 39 | DNQ | 46 |
| 141 | Christian Fittipaldi | | | | | | | | | | | | | | | | | | | | | | | | | | | | | | | | | 39 | 46 |
| 142 | Mike Bliss | 40 | | | | | | | | | | | | | | | | | | | | | | | | | | | | | | | | | 43 |
| 143 | Ross Thompson | | | | | | | | | | | | | | | | | | | | | | | | | | | | | | | 40 | | | 43 |
| 144 | Mike Potter | | | | | | | | | | | | | | | | | | | | | | 41 | | | | | | | | | | | | 40 |
| 145 | Ricky Sanders | | | | | | | | | | | | | | | | | | | | | | | | | 41 | | | | | | | | | 40 |
| 146 | Carl Long | | | | 42 | | | | | | | | | | | | | | | | | | | | | | | | | | | | | | 37 |
| 147 | Jeff Fuller | | | | | | | | | | 42 | | | | | | Wth | | | | | | | | | | | | | | | | | | 37 |
| 148 | Jerry McCart | | | | | | 43 | | | | | | | | | | | | | | | | | | | | | | | | | | | | 34 |
| 149 | Tom Carey Jr. | | | | | | | | | | | | | | | | | | | | | 43 | | | | | | | | | | | | DNQ | 34 |
| 150 | Ed Berrier | | | | | | | | | | | | | | | | | | | | | QL | | | | | | | 43 | | | | | | 34 |
| 151 | Steve Grissom | 26 | | | | | | | | | | | | | | | | | | | | | | | | | | | | | | | | | |
| 152 | Sean Woodside | | | | | | | | | | 40 | | | | | | | | | | | | | | | | | | | | | | | | |
| 153 | Brendan Gaughan | | | | | | | | | | 41 | | | | | | | | | | | | | | | | | | | | | | | | |
| 154 | Dave Blaney | | | | | | | | | | | | | | DNQ | 43 | | | | | | | | | | | | | | | | | | | |
| 155 | Tina Gordon | | | | | | | | | | | | | | | | | | | | | | | | | 43 | | | | | | | | | |
| 156 | Rich Woodland Jr. | | | | | | | | | | | | | | DNQ | | | | | DNQ | | | | | | | | | | | | | | | |
| 157 | Wayman Wittman | | | | | | | | | | | | | | | | | | | | | | DNQ | | | | Wth | | | | | | | | |
| 158 | Mardy Lindley | | | | | | | | | | | | | | | | | | | | | | DNQ | | | | | | | | | | | | |
| 159 | Randy Ratliff | | | | | | | | | | | | | | | | | | | | | | | | DNQ | | DNQ | | | | | | | | |
| 160 | Steven Christian | | | | | | | | | | | | | | | | | | | | | | | | | | DNQ | | | | | | | | |
| 161 | J. R. Robbs | | | | | | | | | | | | | | | | | | | | | | | | | | | | | DNQ | | | | | |
| 162 | Sammy Ragan | | | | | | | | | | | | | | | | | | | | | | | | | | | | | | DNQ | | | | |
| 163 | Damon Lusk | | | | | | | | | | | | | | | | | | | | | | | | | | | | | | | DNQ | | | |
| 164 | Morgan Shepherd | | | | | | | | | | | | | | | | | | | | | | | | | | | | | | | | | DNQ | |
| 165 | Danny Bagwell | | | | | | | | | | | | | | | | | | | | | | | | | | | | | | | | | DNQ | |
| 166 | Richard Jarvis Jr. | | | | | | | | | | | | | | | | | | | | | | | | | | | | | | | | Wth | | |
| Pos | Driver | DAY | CAR | LVS | ATL | DAR | BRI | TEX | NSH | TAL | CAL | RCH | NHA | NAZ | CLT | DOV | KEN | MIL | GLN | CHI | GTY | PPR | IRP | MCH | BRI | DAR | RCH | DOV | KAN | CLT | MEM | PHO | CAR | HOM | Pts |

== Rookie of the Year ==
Greg Biffle of Roush Racing won the Rookie of the Year title in 2001, winning a record five races and finishing fourth in points, in addition to leading the championship standings at one point in the season. Runner-up was Scott Wimmer, who finished twenty-six points out of tenth in final standings. Jamie McMurray and Larry Foyt finished 3rd and 4th respectively, while Kelly Denton and Christian Elder signed to run limited schedules with their teams. Marty Houston, Tim Sauter, and David Donohue were either released during the season or had their team shut down due to sponsor issues.

== See also ==
- 2001 NASCAR Winston Cup Series
- 2001 NASCAR Craftsman Truck Series
- 2001 ARCA Re/Max Series
- 2001 NASCAR Goody's Dash Series
