= Nate Monteith =

American racing driver (born 1981)

- Born: December 7, 1981 (age 44); Bristol, Tennessee, U.S.

NASCAR O'Reilly Auto Parts Series career
- 2 races run over 1 year
- Best finish: 99th (2001)
- First race: 2001 Nazareth 200 (Nazareth)
- Last race: 2001 Kroger 200 (Indianapolis)
Wins	Top tens	Poles
0	0	0

NASCAR FedEx Freight Truck Series career
- 3 races run over 3 years
- Best finish: 81st (2013)
- First race: 2007 O'Reilly 200 (Bristol)
- Last race: 2013 UNOH 200 (Bristol)
Wins	Top tens	Poles
0	0	0

ARCA Menards Series career
- 5 races run over 4 years
- Best finish: 96th (2001)
- First race: 1999 Eddie Gilstrap Motors 200 (Salem)
- Last race: 2009 Kansas Lottery 150 (Kansas)
Wins	Top tens	Poles
0	1	0
- Statistics up to date as of February 10, 2025.

Nate Monteith (born December 7, 1981) is an American former professional stock car racing driver who has previously competed in the NASCAR Nationwide Series, the NASCAR Camping World Truck Series, and the ARCA Racing Series.

Monteith has also competed in series such as the CARS Late Model Stock Tour, the X-1R Pro Cup Series, the ARA Late Model Stock All-Star Tour, and the UARA STARS Late Model Series.

== Motorsports results ==
=== NASCAR ===
(key) (Bold – Pole position awarded by qualifying time. Italics – Pole position earned by points standings or practice time. * – Most laps led.)

==== Busch Series ====
NASCAR Busch Series results
Year	Team	No.	Make	1	2	3	4	5	6	7	8	9	10	11	12	13	14	15	16	17	18	19	20	21	22	23	24	25	26	27	28	29	30	31	32	33	NBSC	Pts	Ref
2001	Jay Robinson Racing	94	Pontiac	DAY	CAR	LVS	ATL	DAR	BRI	TEX	NSH	TAL	CAL	RCH	NHA	NZH; 36	CLT	DOV	KEN	MLW	GLN	CHI	GTY	PPR													99th	116	
2001	Monteith Racing	84	Chevy																						IRP; 34	MCH											99th	116	
2001	Monteith Racing	44	Chevy																								BRI; DNQ	DAR	RCH	DOV	KAN	CLT	MEM	PHO	CAR	HOM	99th	116	

==== Camping World Truck Series ====
NASCAR Camping World Truck Series results
Year	Team	No.	Make	1	2	3	4	5	6	7	8	9	10	11	12	13	14	15	16	17	18	19	20	21	22	23	24	25	NCWTC	Pts	Ref
2007	Billy Ballew Motorsports	15	Chevy	DAY	CAL	ATL	MAR	KAN	CLT	MFD	DOV	TEX	MCH	MLW	MEM	KEN	IRP	NSH	BRI; 33	GTW	NHA	LVS	TAL	MAR	ATL	TEX	PHO	HOM	105th	64	
2009	Billy Ballew Motorsports	09	Toyota	DAY	CAL	ATL	MAR	KAN	CLT	DOV	TEX	MCH	MLW	MEM	KEN	IRP	NSH	BRI; 26	CHI	IOW	GTW	NHA	LVS	MAR	TAL	TEX	PHO	HOM	95th	85	
2013	DDK Motorsports	45	Toyota	DAY	MAR	CAR	KAN	CLT	DOV	TEX	KEN	IOW	ELD	POC	MCH	BRI; 35	MSP	IOW	CHI	LVS	TAL	MAR	TEX	PHO	HOM				81st	9	

=== ARCA Re/Max Series ===
(key) (Bold – Pole position awarded by qualifying time. Italics – Pole position earned by points standings or practice time. * – Most laps led.)

ARCA Re/Max Series results
Year	Team	No.	Make	1	2	3	4	5	6	7	8	9	10	11	12	13	14	15	16	17	18	19	20	21	22	23	24	25	ARSC	Pts	Ref
1999	Drew White	98	Pontiac	DAY	ATL	SLM	AND	CLT	MCH	POC	TOL	SBS	BLN	POC	KIL	FRS	FLM	ISF	WIN	DSF	SLM; 24	CLT	TAL	ATL					125th	110	
2001	Dennis English	06	Pontiac	DAY	NSH; 23	WIN	SLM	GTY	KEN	CLT	KAN	MCH	POC	MEM	GLN	KEN	MCH	POC	NSH	ISF	CHI	DSF	SLM	TOL	BLN	CLT			96th	290	
2001	N/A	44	Pontiac																								TAL; 11	ATL	96th	290	
2002	Donald Monteith	17	Pontiac	DAY; 8	ATL	NSH	SLM	KEN	CLT	KAN	POC	MCH	TOL	SBO	KEN	BLN	POC	NSH	ISF	WIN	DSF	CHI	SLM	TAL	CLT				119th	190	
2009	Hixson Motorsports	28	Chevy	DAY	SLM	CAR	TAL	KEN	TOL	POC	MCH	MFD	IOW	KEN	BLN	POC	ISF	CHI	TOL	DSF	NJE	SLM	KAN; 17	CAR					127th	145	

=== CARS Late Model Stock Car Tour ===
(key) (Bold – Pole position awarded by qualifying time. Italics – Pole position earned by points standings or practice time. * – Most laps led. ** – All laps led.)

CARS Late Model Stock Car Tour results
Year	Team	No.	Make	1	2	3	4	5	6	7	8	9	10	11	12	13	CLMSCTC	Pts	Ref
2017	Nate Monteith	44M	N/A	CON	DOM	DOM	HCY	HCY	BRI; 23	AND	ROU	TCM	ROU	HCY	CON	SBO	69th	10	
