= Mike Swaim Jr. =

American racing driver (born 1976)

- Born: June 16, 1976 (age 50); High Point, North Carolina, U.S.
- Achievements: 1997 NASCAR Goody's Dash Series Champion

NASCAR O'Reilly Auto Parts Series career
- 3 races run over 2 years
- First race: 1999 Alltel 200 (Rockingham)
- Last race: 2001 NAPAonline.com 250 (Michigan)
Wins	Top tens	Poles
0	0	0

NASCAR FedEx Freight Truck Series career
- 3 races run over 1 year
- First race: 1999 NAPA 250 (Martinsville)
- Last race: 1999 NAPA 300K (Pikes Peak)
Wins	Top tens	Poles
0	0	0

Mike Swaim Jr. (born June 16, 1976) is an American former NASCAR driver. He made a few starts in the NASCAR Craftsman Truck Series and NASCAR Busch Grand National Series, but found most of his success in the NASCAR Goody's Dash Series, winning 12 races in his career and the 1997 championship driving for Falcon Racing. He made his first career Busch series start for Innovative Motorsports after Andy Santerre broke his leg in a wreck in the season opening race at Daytona International Speedway.

Swaim is the son of former racing driver Mike Swaim, who also competed in NASCAR.

== Motorsports career results ==
=== NASCAR ===
(key) (Bold – Pole position awarded by qualifying time. Italics – Pole position earned by points standings or practice time. * – Most laps led.)

==== Busch Series ====
NASCAR Busch Series results
Year	Team	No.	Make	1	2	3	4	5	6	7	8	9	10	11	12	13	14	15	16	17	18	19	20	21	22	23	24	25	26	27	28	29	30	31	32	33	NBSC	Pts	Ref
1999	Innovative Motorsports	47	Chevy	DAY	CAR; 40	LVS	ATL	DAR	TEX	NSV	BRI	TAL	CAL	NHA	RCH	NZH	CLT	DOV	SBO	GLN	MLW	MYB	PPR	GTY	IRP	MCH	BRI	DAR	RCH	DOV	CLT	CAR	MEM	PHO	HOM		129th	43	
2001	WP Motorsports	12	Chevy	DAY	CAR	LVS	ATL	DAR	BRI	TEX	NSH	TAL	CAL	RCH	NHA	NZH	CLT	DOV	KEN	MLW	GLN	CHI	GTY; 20	PPR	IRP	MCH; 25	BRI	DAR	RCH	DOV	KAN; DNQ	CLT	MEM	PHO	CAR	HOM	81st	191	

==== Craftsman Truck Series ====
NASCAR Craftsman Truck Series results
Year	Team	No.	Make	1	2	3	4	5	6	7	8	9	10	11	12	13	14	15	16	17	18	19	20	21	22	23	24	25	NCTC	Pts	Ref
1999	CJ Racing	27	Chevy	HOM	PHO	EVG	MMR	MAR; 20	MEM; 25	PPR; 24	I70	BRI	TEX	PIR	GLN	MLW	NSV	NZH	MCH	NHA	IRP	GTY	HPT	RCH	LVS	LVL	TEX	CAL	54th	282	
2002	Cavin Councilor	56	Chevy	DAY; DNQ	DAR; DNQ	MAR	GTY	PPR	DOV	TEX	MEM	MLW	KAN	KEN	NHA	MCH	IRP	NSH	RCH	TEX	SBO	LVS	CAL	PHO	HOM				NA	-	

==== Goody's Dash Series ====
NASCAR Goody's Dash Series results
Year	Team	No.	Make	1	2	3	4	5	6	7	8	9	10	11	12	13	14	15	16	17	18	19	20	21	NGDS	Pts	Ref
1995	Falcon Racing	28	Pontiac	DAY	FLO; 26	LAN; 6	MYB; 19	SUM; 6	HCY; 14	CAR; 12	STH; 3	BRI; 1	SUM; 14	GRE; 25		MYB; 22	NSV; 4	FLO; 24	NWS; 1	VOL; 17	HCY; 1	HOM; 27			9th	2322	
1995	Falcon Racing	23	Pontiac												BGS; 4										9th	2322	
1996	Falcon Racing	28	Pontiac	**DAY**; 3	HOM; 18	MYB; 9	SUM; 13	NSV; 4	TRI; 9	CAR; 4	HCY; 5	FLO; 20	BRI; 23	SUM; 20	GRE; 2	SNM; 22	BGS; 12	MYB; 6	LAN; 9	STH; 10*	FLO; 1*	NWS; 8	**VOL**; 1**	HCY; 3	5th	2932	
1997	Falcon Racing	28	Pontiac	DAY; 5	HOM; 16	**KIN**; 3	MYB; 15	LAN; 1	**CAR**; 1*	**TRI**; 1*	FLO; 1	HCY; 2	BRI; 6	GRE; 10	SNM; 3	**CLT**; 2	MYB; 2	LAN; 7	**SUM**; 11	STA; 5	HCY; 2	USA; 3	CON; 4	HOM; 10	1st	3292	
1998	Falcon Racing	28	Pontiac	**DAY**; 1*	HCY; 4	CAR; 1	**CLT**; 41	TRI	LAN	**BRI**; 20*	SUM	GRE	ROU	SNM	MYB	CON	HCY	LAN	STA; 27	LOU	VOL	USA	HOM; 1*		26th	925	
1999	N/A	12	Dodge	DAY; 23	HCY	CAR	CLT	BRI	LOU	SUM	GRE	ROU	STA	MYB	HCY	LAN	USA	JAC	LAN						N/A	0	

=== ARCA Re/Max Series ===
(key) (Bold – Pole position awarded by qualifying time. Italics – Pole position earned by points standings or practice time. * – Most laps led.)

ARCA Re/Max Series results
Year	Team	No.	Make	1	2	3	4	5	6	7	8	9	10	11	12	13	14	15	16	17	18	19	20	21	22	23	24	25	ARMC	Pts	Ref
1996		90	Ford	DAY	ATL	SLM	TAL	FIF	LVL	CLT	CLT	KIL	FRS	POC	MCH	FRS	TOL	POC	MCH	INF	SBS	ISF	DSF	KIL	SLM	WIN	CLT	ATL; 36	NA	-	
1997	Swaim Racing	5	Pontiac	DAY	ATL	SLM	CLT; 8	CLT; 5	POC	MCH	SBS	TOL	KIL	FRS	MIN	POC	MCH	DSF	GTW	SLM	WIN	CLT	TAL	ISF	ATL; DNQ				NA	-	
1998	Swaim Racing	22	Pontiac	DAY	ATL; 14	SLM	CLT; 6	MEM	MCH	POC	SBS	TOL	PPR	POC	KIL	FRS	ISF	ATL; 5	DSF	SLM	TEX	WIN	CLT; 7	TAL	ATL; 1				NA	-	
1999	WP Motorsports	22	Pontiac	DAY; 4	ATL; 19*	SLM	AND	CLT; 6	MCH; 18	POC; 17	TOL	SBS	BLN	POC; 5	KIL	FRS	FLM	ISF	WIN	DSF	SLM	CLT; 7	TAL; 8	ATL; 9					21st	1615	
2000	WP Motorsports	22	Pontiac	DAY; 16	SLM	AND	CLT; 9	KIL	FRS	MCH; 23	POC; 2	TOL	KEN; 8	BLN	POC; 5	WIN	ISF	KEN	DSF	SLM	CLT; 11	TAL; 24	ATL; 35						23rd	1440	
2001	WP Motorsports	22	Pontiac	DAY; 28	NSH; 5	WIN	SLM	GTY; 2	KEN; 3	CLT; 8	KAN; 18	MCH	POC; 4	MEM	GLN	KEN	MCH	POC; 4	NSH	ISF	CHI	DSF	SLM	TOL	BLN	CLT	TAL	ATL	26th	1495	

Sporting positions
Preceded by Lyndon Amick	NASCAR Goody's Dash Series Champion; 1997	Succeeded by Robert Huffman
