= Jay Robinson (auto racing) =

American racing team owner

- Born: November 7, 1959 (age 67); Charlotte, North Carolina, U.S.
- Occupation: NASCAR team owner
- Employer: Premium Motorsports (owner)

Jay Robinson (born November 7, 1959) is an American auto racing executive who is a part-owner of Premium Motorsports (previously known as Jay Robinson Racing). Prior to this, Robinson earned his wealth in the wholesale grocery business.

== Racing career ==
=== Driver ===
Robinson first competed in the NASCAR All-American Series in 1998 and 1999.

In 2000, Robinson won six races in the series.

=== Team owner ===
==== Jay Robinson Racing ====
===== Xfinity Series =====
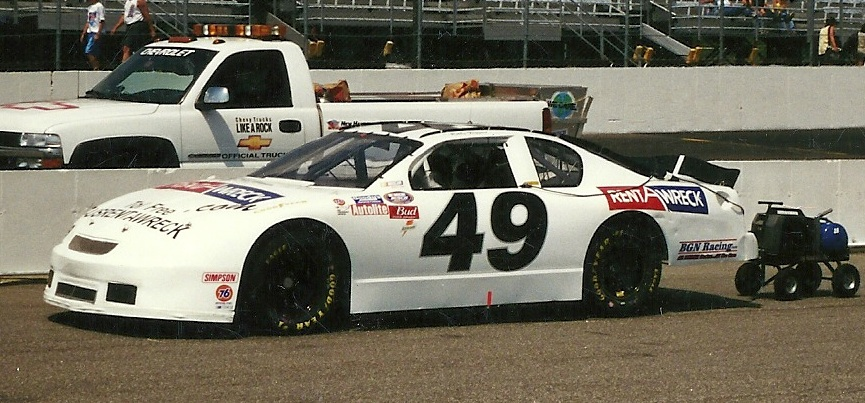
Robbie Faggart in Robinson's car at the 2001 CVS Pharmacy 200 at New Hampshire International Speedway.

Robinson first competed as a team owner in the NASCAR Xfinity Series in 2000. The team's first race was the Myrtle Beach 250 at Myrtle Beach Speedway with Rodney Childers driving the No. 49 Southern Marine Chevrolet Monte Carlo. Childers started 33rd and finished 43rd (out of 43 cars) due to a crash after 69 laps.

The team generally competed with different drivers in a particular car throughout the season. The first season the team competed with the same driver was when Kenny Wallace drove the No. 28 United States Border Patrol Chevrolet Impala SS in 2008. That season, Wallace got a best finish of 7th at the U.S. Cellular 250 at Iowa Speedway. Wallace would also finish 11th in the final point standings.

Robinson's team competed in the series through 2011, getting a best finish of 3rd place with Wallace at the 2011 Kroger On Track for the Cure 250 at Memphis Motorsports Park.

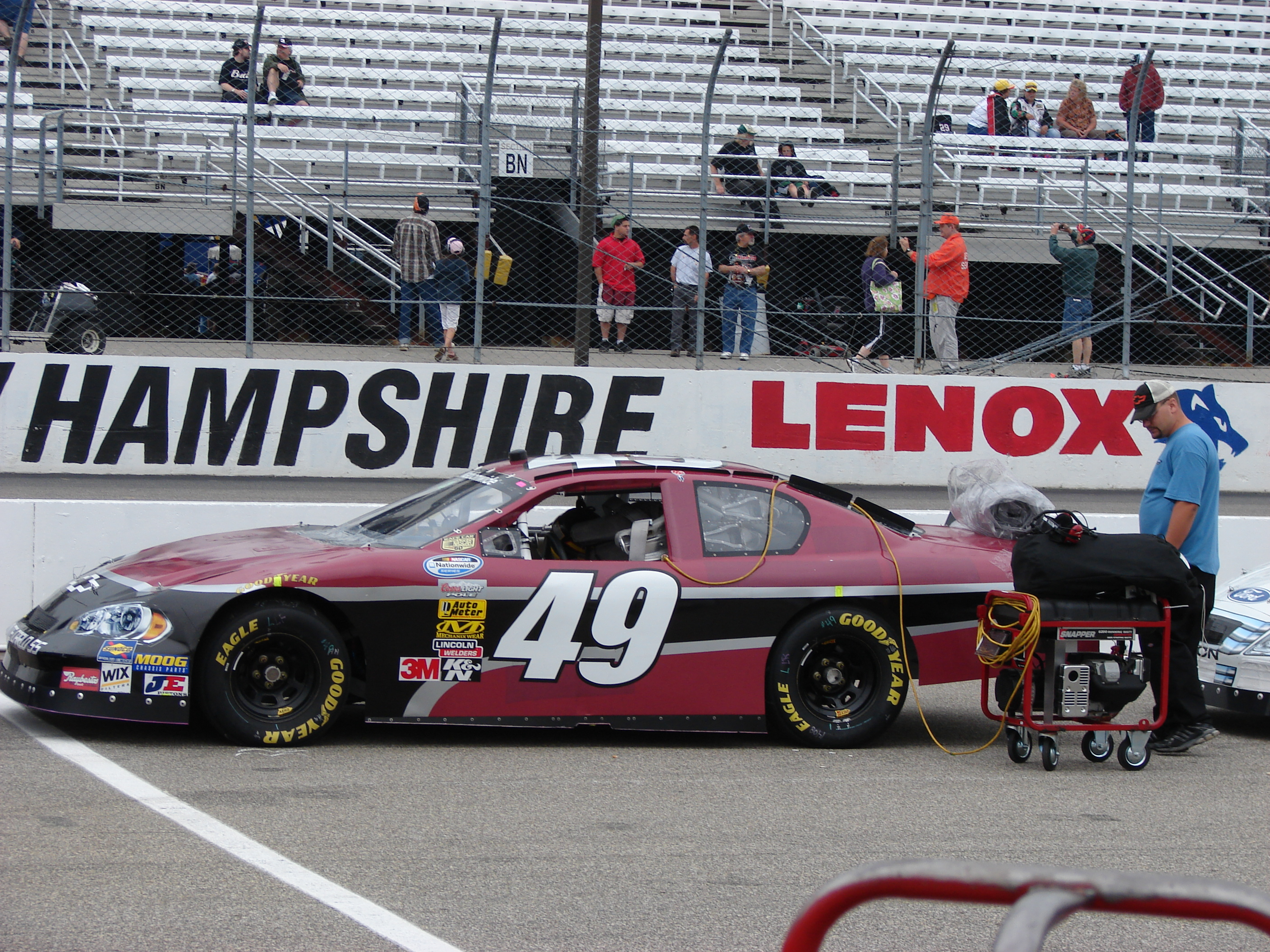
Kertus Davis in Robinson's car at the 2008 Camping World RV Sales 200 at New Hampshire Motor Speedway. Davis frequently started and parked that season. He finished 35th in this race, claiming clutch issues.

Later in their history, the team often used the practice of starting and parking (starting a race with no intention of finishing the race to collect the prize money) to fund their primary car. Robinson said of this activity, "The 28 car wouldn’t run without the start-and-park car. No chance. These haulers haul two cars. If you bring both of them in one transporter, you can make the numbers work out. If I brought only one car, I couldn’t make it work without more sponsorship. We’d race the 49 tomorrow, too, if there was a way."

==== Robinson-Blakeney Racing ====
Robinson partnered with Houston, Texas, Texas businessman Troy Blakney to form Robinson-Blakeney Racing.

===== Cup Series =====
In the Cup Series in 2012, the team fielded the No. 49 America Israel Racing/JPO Absorbents Toyota Camry with J. J. Yeley and later Jason Leffler serving as the drivers.

Yeley drove the car through the Lenox Industrial Tools 301 at New Hampshire Motor Speedway. Yeley's best finish in the car was a 30th-place finish at the Food City 500 at Bristol Motor Speedway.

Leffler then attempted six races later in the season, qualifying for three of them. The best finish by Leffler in the car also came at Bristol, as he finished 31st at the Irwin Tools Night Race.

Following the season, most of the team's equipment was put up for auction.

===== Xfinity Series =====
The team also competed in the Xfinity Series in 2012 with Yeley, David Green, Derrike Cope, Kevin Lepage and Tony Raines driving the No. 28 JPO Absorbents Chevrolet Camaro and Dodge Challenger.

Lepage would get the finish for the team, finishing 31st at the Ford EcoBoost 300 at Bristol Motor Speedway.

==== NEMCO-JRR Motorsports ====
Prior to the 2013 season, Robinson merged his team with Joe Nemechek's NEMCO Motorsports.

===== Cup Series =====
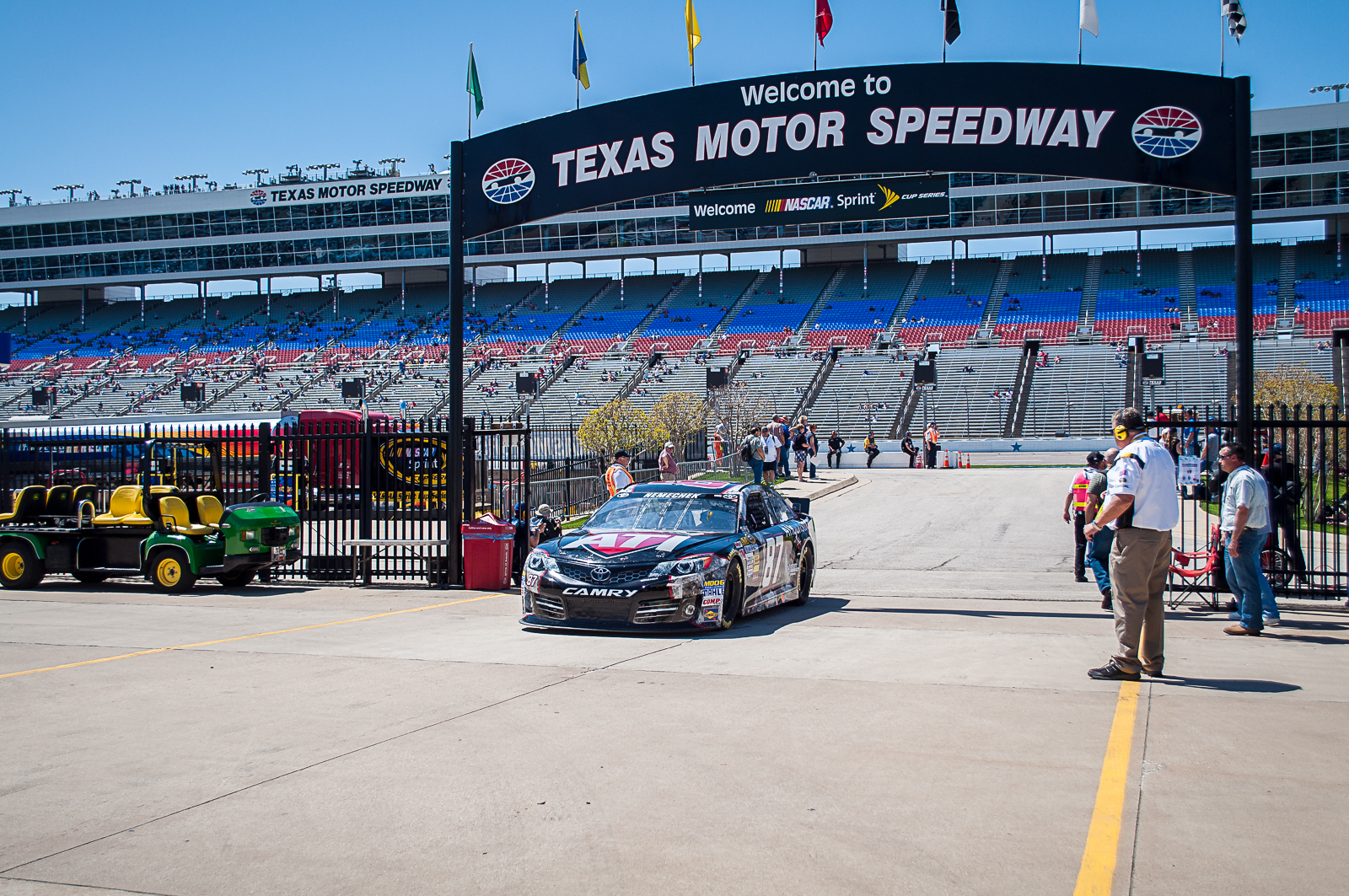
Nemechek at the 2013 NRA 500 at Texas Motor Speedway.

Nemechek drove the No. 87 Toyota Camry in 34 races, qualifying for 33 of them, getting a best finish of 25th place at the Camping World RV Sales 301 at New Hampshire Motor Speedway.

Tomy Drissi also drove the car at the two road course races, finishing 38th at the Toyota/Save Mart 350 at Sonoma Raceway and 42nd, due to a crash, at the Cheez-It 355 at The Glen at Watkins Glen International.

===== Xfinity Series =====
Nemechek also drove the No. 87 AM/FM Energy Wood & Pellet Stoves/England's Stove Works Toyota Camry in 28 of 33 Xfinity Series races in 2013, with Lepage and Johnny Sauter driving the car at the Iowa Speedway races.

During the season, Nemechek got a best finish of 14th place at the Royal Purple 300 at Auto Club Speedway. Despite missing five races, Nemechek finished 19th in the final point standings with 513 points.

==== Identity Ventures Racing ====
Prior to the 2014 season, Nemechek and Robinson created a partnership with five business leaders, including housing investor Nat Hardwick. Michael Waltrip Racing later joined the team as a partner.

===== Cup Series =====
The fielded the No. 66 BlueDEF Diesel Exhaust Fluid/Land Castle Title/Royal Teak Collection Toyota Camry with Michael Waltrip, Nemechek, Jeff Burton, Brett Moffitt, Drissi, Timmy Hill and Mike Wallace driving at various points in the year. The car was run out of Waltrip's shop when Waltrip, Burton and Moffitt drove the car. Separate cars for the team were also driven by Nemechek, Hill and Wallace.

Burton got the best finish in the car with a 17th-place finish at the Kobalt 400 at Las Vegas Motor Speedway. Moffitt got the best finish in the car when it came out of Robinson's shop with a 22nd-place finish at the FedEx 400 at Dover International Speedway.

It was later revealed that Hardwick embezzled at least $30 million from his companies, causing him and Land Castle Title (a company he was chief executive officer of) to be removed from the team.

==== Premium Motorsports ====
After Identity Ventures' demise, Robinson reformed the team as Premium Motorsports.

===== Cup Series =====
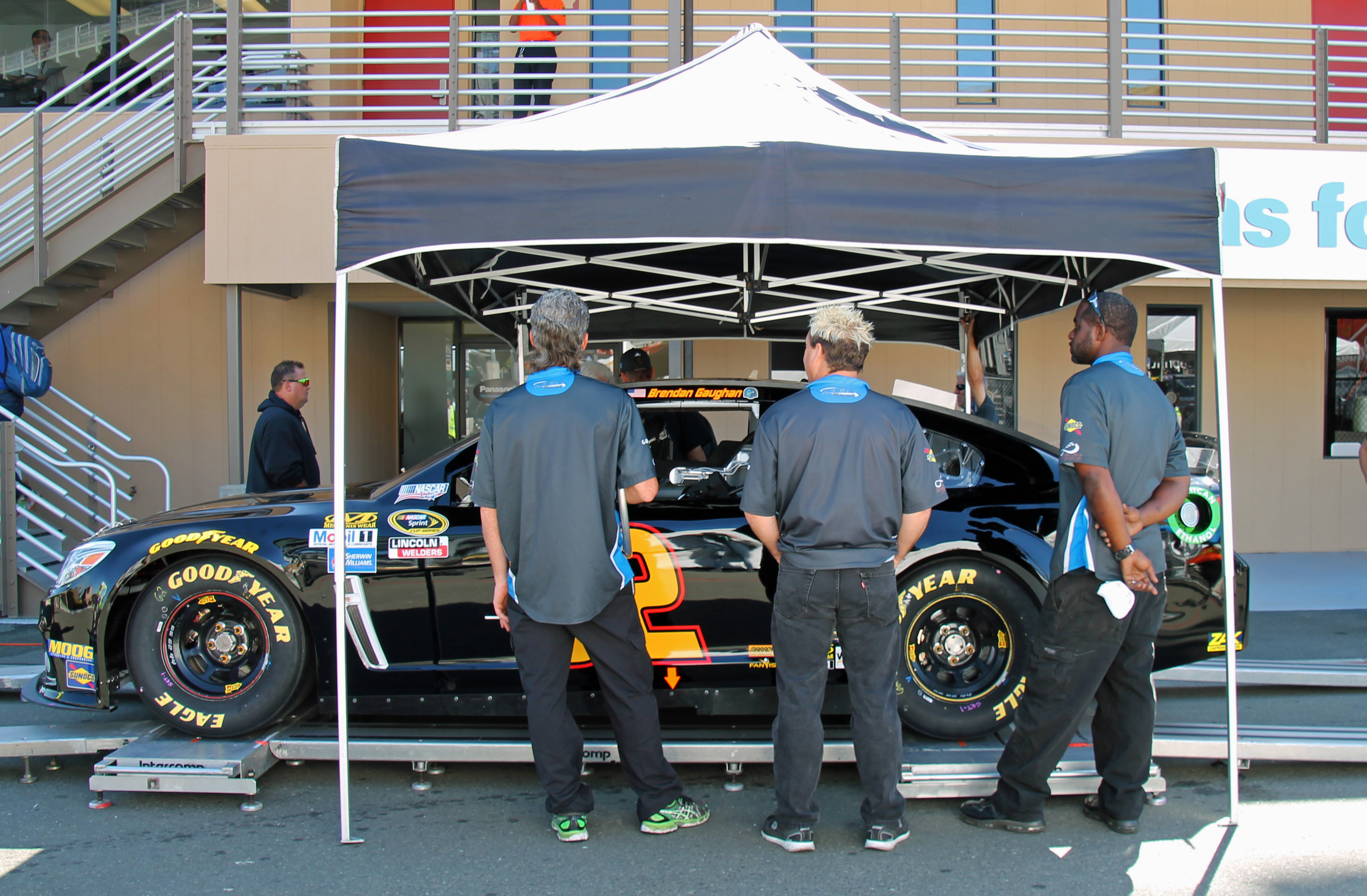
Brendan Gaughan's car at the 2015 Toyota/Save Mart 350 at Sonoma Raceway.

The team started to compete in the Cup Series in 2015. Like Robinson's earlier Xfinity Series team, the team often uses multiple drivers in a car throughout the season.

Since entering the Cup Series, Robinson has purchased various teams and folded them into his organization. These purchases started with purchasing Tommy Baldwin Racing's second car (namely the owners points and equipment). Robinson subsequently purchased Phil Parsons Racing in 2015, Hillman Racing in 2016 and the remainder of Baldwin's team in 2017.

At the 2016 AAA Texas 500 at Texas Motor Speedway, No. 55 Toyota Camry driven by Reed Sorenson was sponsored by Donald Trump's Presidential campaign, which proved to be controversial.

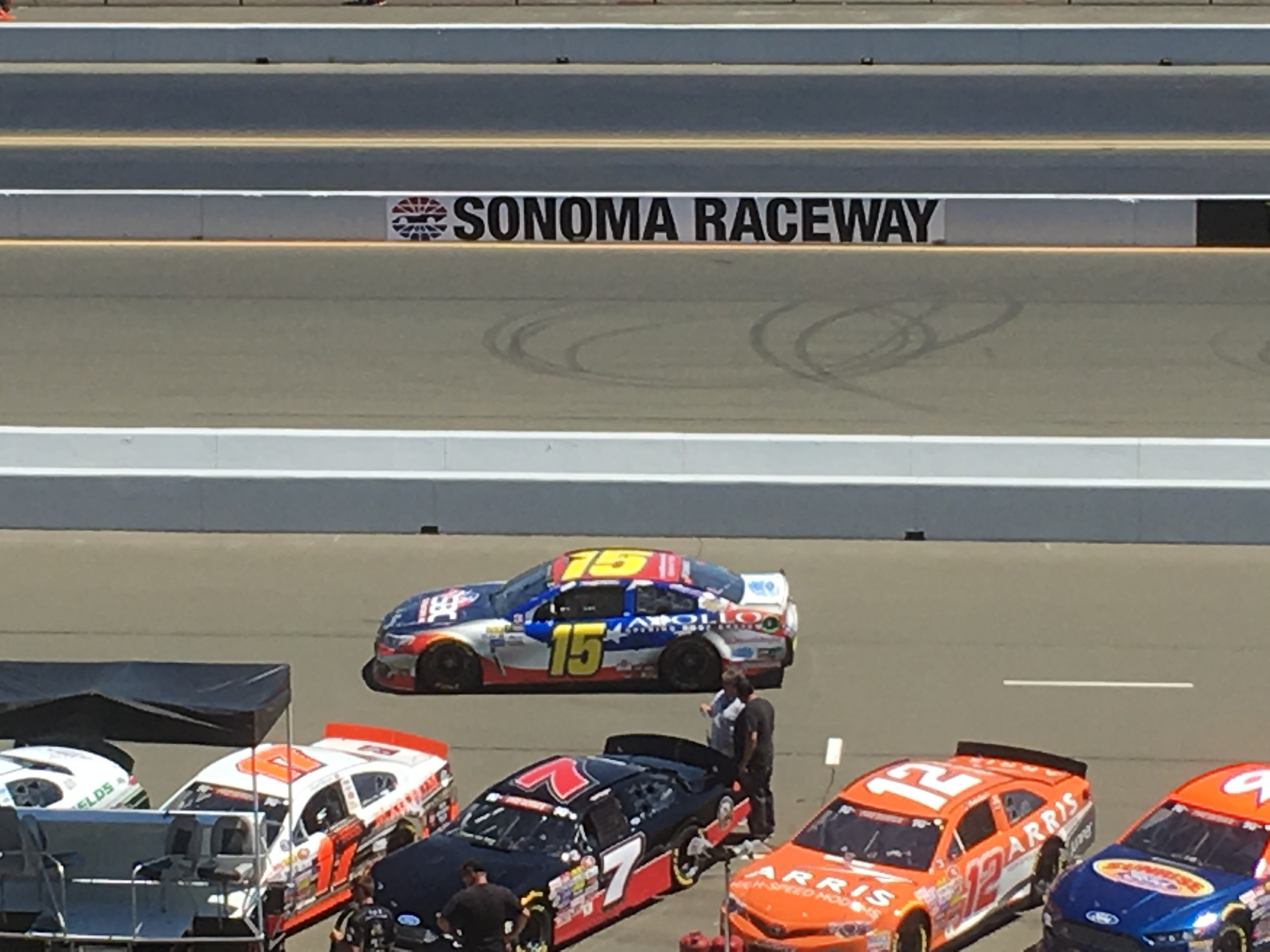
Kevin O'Connell practicing for the 2017 Toyota/Save Mart 350 at Sonoma Raceway.

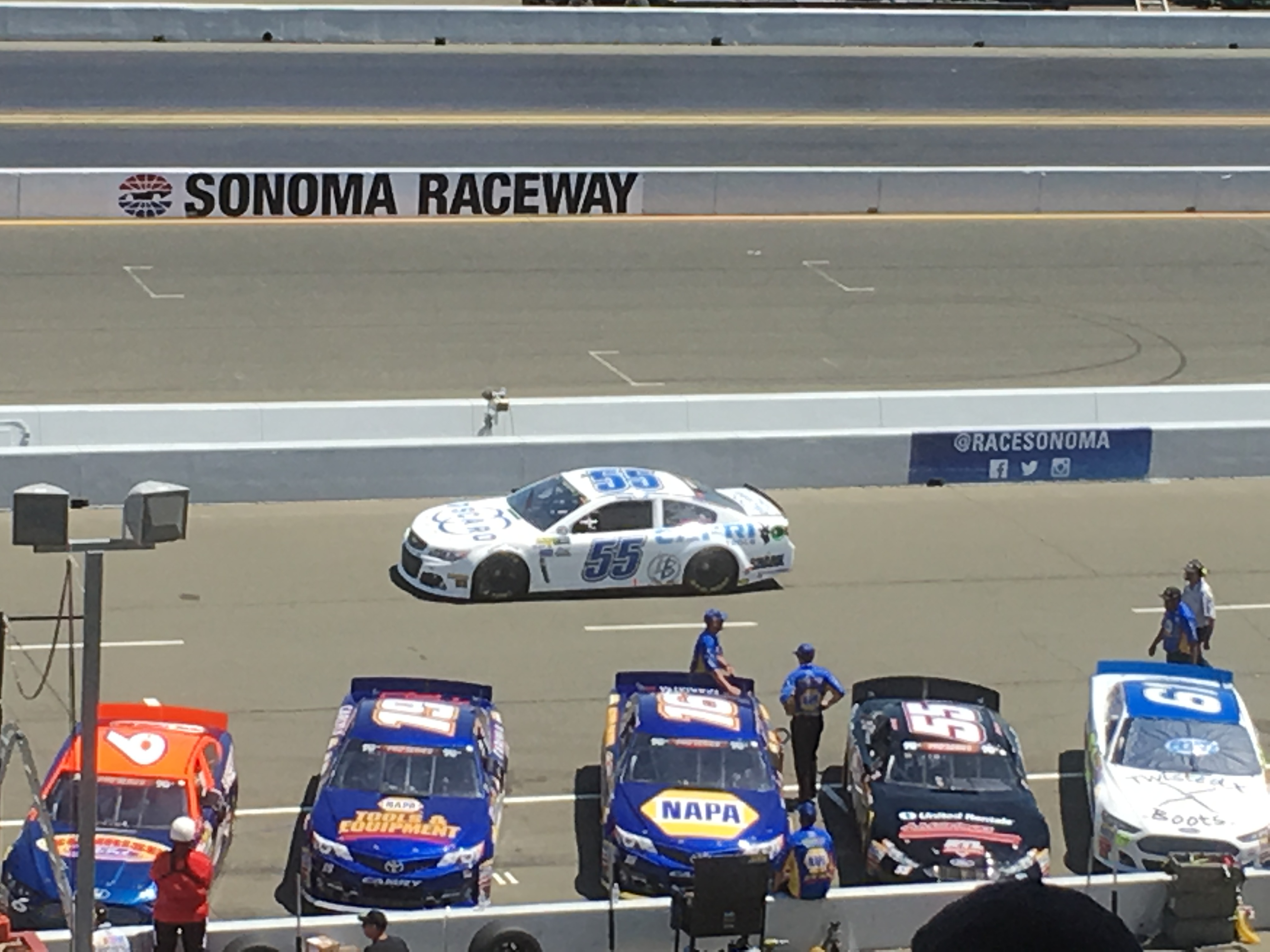
Tommy Regan practicing for the 2017 Toyota/Save Mart 350 at Sonoma Raceway.

A car owned by Robinson got its first top 10 finish in a Cup Series race when Michael Waltrip finished in 9th place at the 2017 Daytona 500.

===== Truck Series =====
Premium Motorsports also began to compete in the Truck Series in 2015. The made their debut at the season-opening NextEra Energy Resources 250 at Daytona International Speedway with Travis Kvapil driving the No. 94 Chargebacks 911/MerchantSystems.com Chevrolet Silverado. Kvapil qualified 2nd, but finished 15th, seven laps down.

In 2017, Wendell Chavous started 21 of 23 races for the team, getting a best finish of 14th place at the Las Vegas 350 at Las Vegas Motor Speedway. Chavous would finish 16th in the final standings with 348 points.
