= Mark Voigt =

American auto racing driver

- Born: October 5, 1961 (age 65); Marine, Illinois, U.S.

NASCAR O'Reilly Auto Parts Series career
- 3 races run over 1 year
- Best finish: 91st (2001)
- First race: 2001 South Carolina 200 (Darlington)
- Last race: 2001 Outback Steakhouse 200 (Phoenix)
Wins	Top tens	Poles
0	0	0

Mark Voigt (born October 5, 1961) is an American former NASCAR driver. He raced three times in the Busch Series in 2001. He is also a local dirt track driver.

== Racing career ==
Voigt began his career at the age of four, when his father (involved in racing) bought him his first go-kart. It took him a while, but at the age of sixteen he began his career by winning back to back St. Louis Karting Association Championships.

In 1982, at the Highland Speedway, Voigt moved to the Sportsman class and was Rookie of the Year. Then, he later moved up to the modifieds, where he claimed another Rookie of the Year. By the 1990s, he was in Late Models, where he began finishing high in the UMP (late model) point standings. By 1995, he had finished second nationally, and had won the Missouri state championship.

In the 1997 racing season, Voigt moved to the ARCA Racing Series running two asphalt tracks and one dirt track. Behind the wheel of No. 30 Chevrolet Monte Carlo for his own team (Voigt Racing), he pulled out a fourth-place finish at Winchester Speedway. In 1998, he ran three speedway races - with a best run of twentieth (Michigan). His best qualifying run was at Salem Speedway in 1998 where he started third. His best finish in the championship was eighteenth in the 1998 ARCA championship. Voigt left the series following 2001, after 34 starts, two top-fives and seven top-tens.

Voigt attempted to make two races early in the NASCAR Busch Series 2001 season, but failed to qualify both times. Finally, he made his debut in the No. 30 Voigt Racing Chevy at Darlington in September 2001. He barely made the field, qualifying last place in 43rd. However, he did improve to 36th before falling out of the race. He then ran Memphis, starting 41st and finishing 34th in a minor improvement from his debut. Voigt then ran a race at Phoenix for HighLine Performance Group. However, he finished last (43rd) after parking the car early. He has not raced in NASCAR Busch Series since.

In 2002, Voigt moved to the NASCAR Midwest Series. He would finish sixteenth in points in his first full season in 2003, with little success, where he had one top-ten in sixteen starts. Voigt would leave that ride after 2004.

Since 2005, Voigt has been racing late models at I-55 Speedway, winning a number of races.

== Motorsports career results ==
=== NASCAR ===
(key) (Bold – Pole position awarded by qualifying time. Italics – Pole position earned by points standings or practice time. * – Most laps led.)

==== Busch Series ====
NASCAR Busch Series results
Year	Team	No.	Make	1	2	3	4	5	6	7	8	9	10	11	12	13	14	15	16	17	18	19	20	21	22	23	24	25	26	27	28	29	30	31	32	33	NBSC	Pts
2001	Voigt Racing	30	Chevy	DAY	CAR	LVS	ATL	DAR	BRI	TEX	NSH	TAL	CAL	RCH	NHA	NZH	CLT	DOV	KEN	MLW	GLN	CHI	GTY; DNQ	PPR; DNQ	IRP	MCH	BRI	DAR; 36	RCH	DOV	KAN	CLT	MEM; 34				91st	150
2001	HighLine Performance Group	8	Chevy																															PHO; 43	CAR	HOM	91st	150

=== ARCA Re/Max Series ===
(key) (Bold – Pole position awarded by qualifying time. Italics – Pole position earned by points standings or practice time. * – Most laps led.)

ARCA Re/Max Series results
Year	Team	No.	Make	1	2	3	4	5	6	7	8	9	10	11	12	13	14	15	16	17	18	19	20	21	22	23	24	25	ARMSC	Pts	Ref
1997	Voigt Racing	30	Chevy	DAY	ATL	SLM	CLT	CLT	POC	MCH	SBS	TOL	KIL	FRS	MIN	POC	MCH	DSF; 28	GTW	SLM; 18	WIN; 4	CLT	TAL	ISF	ATL				71st	?	
1998	Voigt Racing	30	Chevy	DAY	ATL	SLM; 11	CLT	MEM; 25	MCH; 20	POC; 29	SBS; 6	TOL; 23	PPR; 32	POC	KIL; 26	FRS; 25	ISF; 34	ATL	DSF; 10	SLM; 10	TEX	WIN; 12	CLT	TAL	ATL				18th	2000	
1999	Voigt Racing	30	Chevy	DAY; 17	ATL; 13	SLM; 31	AND; DNQ	CLT; 30	MCH	POC	TOL	SBS	BLN; 13	POC	KIL	FRS	FLM	ISF; 16	WIN; 8	DSF; 17	SLM; 27	CLT	TAL	ATL					19th	1700	
2000	Voigt Racing	30	Chevy	DAY; 31	SLM	AND; DNQ	CLT; DNQ	KIL; DNQ	FRS; DNQ	MCH; DNQ	POC; DNQ	TOL	KEN	BLN	POC	WIN; 27	ISF; 25	KEN	DSF; 11	SLM; 8	CLT	TAL	ATL						45th	690	
2001	Voigt Racing	30	Chevy	DAY; 39	NSH	WIN	SLM																						94th	305	
2001	Capital City Motorsports	38	Chevy					GTY; 11	KEN	CLT	KAN; 27	MCH	POC	MEM	GLN	KEN	MCH	POC	NSH	ISF	CHI	DSF	SLM	TOL	BLN	CLT	TAL	ATL	94th	305	
