= Mardy Lindley =

American racing driver and crew chief

- Born: July 10, 1972 (age 54); Taylors, South Carolina, U.S.

NASCAR O'Reilly Auto Parts Series career
- 1 race run over 1 year
- Best finish: 117th (2003)
- First race: 2003 Kroger 200 (Indianapolis)
Wins	Top tens	Poles
0	0	0
- Statistics up to date as of April 11, 2025.

Marten "Mardy" Lindley (born July 10, 1972) is an American former professional stock car racing driver and crew chief who currently serves as the crew chief primarily for Rajah Caruth and the No. 88 Chevrolet Camaro SS for JR Motorsports in the NASCAR O'Reilly Auto Parts Series. He is the son of the late Butch Lindley, who competed in the NASCAR Busch Series and the NASCAR Winston Cup Series.

Lindley has also competed in one NASCAR Busch Series race in 2003, driving the No. 29 Chevrolet for Richard Childress Racing at Indianapolis Raceway Park, where he finished one lap down in sixteenth place. He has also previously competed in the United Speed Alliance Pro Cup.

Lindley has previously worked for teams such as Roush Fenway Racing, HScott Motorsports, Kyle Busch Motorsports, GMS Racing, and MDM Motorsports.

== Motorsports career results ==
=== NASCAR ===
(key) (Bold - Pole position awarded by qualifying time. Italics - Pole position earned by points standings or practice time. * – Most laps led.)

==== Busch Series ====
NASCAR Busch Series results
Year	Team	No.	Make	1	2	3	4	5	6	7	8	9	10	11	12	13	14	15	16	17	18	19	20	21	22	23	24	25	26	27	28	29	30	31	32	33	34	NBSC	Pts	Ref
2001	Big Fan Racing	89	Chevy	DAY	CAR	LVS	ATL	DAR	BRI	TEX	NSH	TAL	CAL	RCH	NHA	NZH	CLT	DOV	KEN	MLW	GLN	CHI	GTY	PPR	IRP; DNQ	MCH	BRI	DAR	RCH	DOV	KAN	CLT	MEM	PHO	CAR	HOM		N/A	0	
2003	Richard Childress Racing	29	Chevy	DAY	CAR	LVS	DAR	BRI	TEX	TAL	NSH	CAL	RCH	GTY	NZH	CLT	DOV	NSH	KEN	MLW	DAY	CHI	NHA	PPR	IRP; 16	MCH	BRI	DAR	RCH	DOV	KAN	CLT	MEM	ATL	PHO	CAR	HOM	117th	115	
