= WP Motorsports =

Former NASCAR team

- Owner(s): Stephen Palac; Darin Pinkham; Charles Woodruff; Scott Pinkham
- Base: Youngstown, OH; Sturgis, KY
- Series: ARCA Racing Series; NASCAR Busch Series
- Race drivers: Mike Swaim Jr. (#22)-ARCA (#12)-Busch; Damon Lusk (#22)-ARCA; Tim Fedewa (#12)-Busch
- Manufacturer: Chevrolet

Career
- Debut: 2001
- Latest race: 2003
- Races competed: 21
- Race victories: 2

WP Motorsports was an ARCA Racing Series and NASCAR Busch Series team.

== History ==
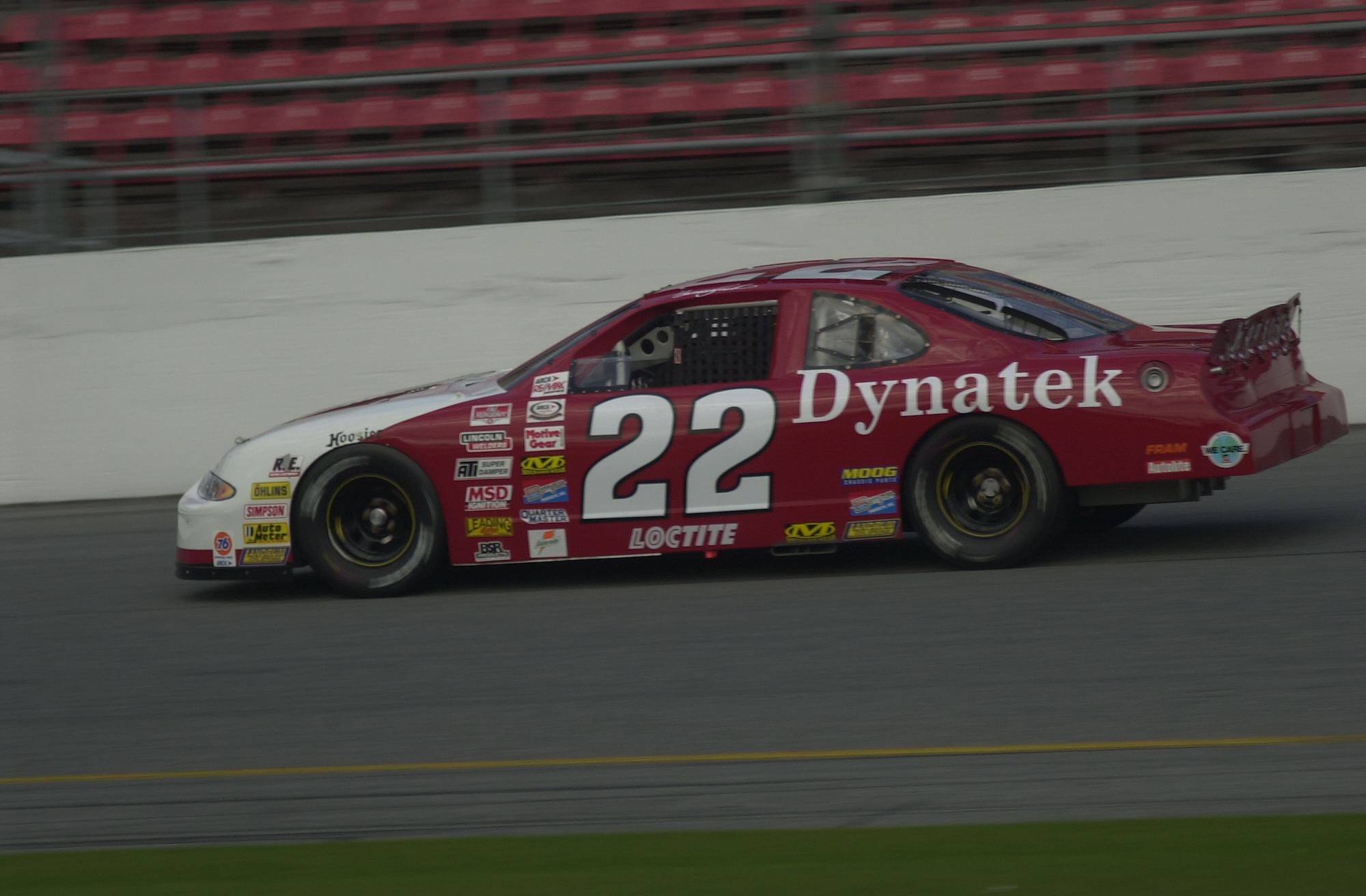
Damon Lusk in the No. 22 for the team at Atlanta in 2002

The team owners were Steve Palac (Youngstown, OH), Darin Pinkham (Phoenix, AZ), Charles Woodruff and Scott Pinkham (Cornwall, NY).

The team was formed in 2000 in preparation for the 2001 ARCA Racing Series and the 2001 NASCAR Busch Series. In 2001 WP Motorsports entered in their first NASCAR Busch Series race at Gateway Motorsports Park at the CarQuest Auto Parts 250 in Illinois and finished in 20th place in their #12 car driven by Mike Swaim Jr. That same year they raced at Michigan Speedway during the NASCAR Busch NAPAonline.com 250 and finished in 25th place. Also in 2001, WP Motorsports and Mike Swaim Jr. competed in eight ARCA races resulting in five top-five finishes and six top-ten finishes in their #22 car. In October 2001 Tim Fedewa drove their #12 Busch Series car in the Little Trees 300 at Lowes Motor Speedway in Charlotte and the GNC Live Well 300 at Homestead–Miami Speedway in November, finishing in 27th place at Lowes and a DNQ at Miami. Keith Strunk who was 1999 Cromwell Tools Crew Chief of the Year served as Crew Chief for the ARCA races and Tim Weiss, from Dale Earnhardt Inc. served as crew chief for the Busch races. Strunk would move to car chief for Busch races.

== Sponsorship ==
Dynatek Telecommunications Inc was their primary sponsor. Dynatek was started and owned by Steve Palac, Darin Pinkham and Scott Pinkham, which were also the founders and owners of WP Motorsports. They were the motorsports team owners and primary sponsor of their own cars. Charles Woodruff was VP of Race Operations and co-owner of WP. Both the ARCA cars and Busch cars adorned the Dynatek Telecommunications red and white logo.

In 2000, prior to forming their own race team, Dynatek sponsored Bill Baird in the NASCAR Cup Series Pocono 500. That race was the catalyst that inspired the owners to start their own race team. One year later in 2001, WP Motorsports would go on to race in ARCA at Pocono twice and finish both times in the top-five. Two years later in 2002, they would go on to win at Pocono.

== Notable Races ==
In 2002, WP Motorsports and Dynatek had two victories. Both victories were in ARCA and driven by Damon Lusk in the No. 22 Chevrolet. One victory came at Pocono Raceway during the Pocono ARCA 200 and the other victory was at Atlanta Motor Speedway at the Pork the Other White Meat 400. WP Motorsports raced at Daytona International Speedway a total of four times. Their best finish at Daytona was when Lusk finished in fifth place. Lusk led the race for 12 laps. Only four drivers led laps that day and the race was cut short due to rain.

== Charity ==
Hall of Fame quarterback and former Buffalo Bills quarterback Jim Kelly served as Honorary Crew Chief for WP Motorsports and Dynatek. A portion of proceeds went to Jim Kelly's charity Hunters Hope. Mark Rush with Dynatek and WP Motorsports was in charge of WP's marketing and public relations and was teammates with Kelly at the University of Miami.
