= Clyde Vickers =

American motorsport industry businessman (1951–2025)

Clyde Vickers (August 24, 1951 – January 3, 2025) was an American motorsport industry businessman, and a stock car racing driver and team owner. Vickers owned CV Products which manufactures and distributes race parts and accessories, as well as several other smaller businesses.

== Background ==
Vickers was raised in Silver Valley, North Carolina, and attended high school there. As a young man, Vickers owned a service station in Thomasville, North Carolina, and worked as a car salesman in High Point, North Carolina. Vickers died on January 3, 2025, at the age of 73.

== Motorsports career ==
Vickers began stock car racing in 1973 in the Hobby division and later moved into the Late Model Sportsman division, racing at Caraway Speedway and Bowman Gray Stadium.

Vickers raced intermittently into the early 1980s, with downtime caused by financial difficulties. In the mid-1970s he went to work on several NASCAR crews, including those run by Morgan Shepherd and Richard Childress.

In 1988, Vickers founded CV Products, an auto racing and powersports parts company located in Thomasville, North Carolina. Vickers remained active in racing during this period, working as a spotter and crew member for former Winston Cup driver Jimmy Means until 1993.

In 1993, in addition to his work with his new company, Vickers began helping his son Brian Vickers with his career as a Go-Kart racer. The younger Vickers later began racing stock cars at age 13 in the Winston Cup series.

In 2001, Vickers owned a team which raced in the NASCAR Busch Series. in which Brian Vickers was a driver. The team was not a financial success. Brian later went on to drive for other teams and win many races.

In 2007 Vickers also was owner of another motorsport company, Xceldyne. By 2009 the companies had merged and were presented with a North Carolina Motorsports Industry Association award as the best large company.

In 2013 CV Products employed 160 people. That year, Vickers was appointed to the North Carolina Motorsports Council.
