= Bruce Bechtel =

American racing driver (born 1955)

- Born: February 13, 1955 (age 71) Corona, California, U.S.

Previous series
- 1997–1998 1997–2001 2002: NASCAR Winston West Series; NASCAR Southwest Series; ARCA Re/Max Series

NASCAR O'Reilly Auto Parts Series career
- 10 races run over 3 years
- Best finish: 76th (2003)
- First race: 2002 Auto Club 300 (Fontana)
- Last race: 2004 Target House 300 (Fontana)
Wins	Top tens	Poles
0	0	0
- Statistics up to date as of June 25, 2020.

Bruce Alan Bechtel (born February 13, 1955) is an American former professional stock car racing driver. He competed in ten races in the NASCAR Busch Series between 2002 and 2004. He also competed part-time in the NASCAR Featherlite Southwest Tour between 1997 and 2001, and the NASCAR Winston West Series part-time in 1997 and 1998 (where he had two top-ten finishes in 1998).

== Personal life ==
Bechtel is from Corona, California where he works as an electrical contractor by trade.

== Motorsports career results ==
=== NASCAR ===
(key) (Bold – Pole position awarded by qualifying time. Italics – Pole position earned by points standings or practice time. * – Most laps led.)

==== Busch Series ====
NASCAR Busch Series results
Year	Team	No.	Make	1	2	3	4	5	6	7	8	9	10	11	12	13	14	15	16	17	18	19	20	21	22	23	24	25	26	27	28	29	30	31	32	33	34	NBSC	Pts	Ref
2002	Moy Racing	77	Ford	DAY	CAR	LVS	DAR	BRI	TEX	NSH	TAL	CAL; 26	RCH	NHA	NZH	CLT	DOV	NSH	KEN	MLW	DAY	CHI	GTY	PPR; 40	IRP	MCH	BRI	DAR	RCH	DOV	KAN	CLT	MEM	ATL; 36	CAR	PHO; 32	HOM	76th	250	
2003	Moy Racing	77	Ford	DAY	CAR	LVS; 24	DAR	BRI	TEX; 32	TAL	NSH	CAL; 28	RCH	GTY	NZH	CLT	DOV	NSH	KEN	MLW	DAY	CHI	NHA	PPR	IRP	MCH	BRI	DAR	RCH	DOV	KAN	CLT	MEM	ATL				84th	274	
2003	Means Racing	52	Ford																																PHO; 42	CAR	HOM	84th	274	
2004	Means Racing	52	Ford	DAY	CAR	LVS	DAR	BRI	TEX	NSH	TAL	CAL	GTY	RCH	NZH	CLT	DOV	NSH	KEN	MLW	DAY	CHI	NHA	PPR; 34	IRP	MCH	BRI											108th	125	
2004	Moy Racing	77	Ford																									CAL; 33	RCH	DOV	KAN	CLT	MEM	ATL	PHO	DAR	HOM	108th	125	

==== Winston West Series ====
NASCAR Winston West Series results
Year	Team	No.	Make	1	2	3	4	5	6	7	8	9	10	11	12	13	14	NWWC	Pts	Ref
1997	Stroppe Motorsports	8	Ford	TUS	AMP	SON	TUS	MMR	LVS	CAL; 24	EVG	POR	PPR	AMP	SON	MMR	LVS	74th	91	
1998	Bechtel Motorsports	50	Chevy	TUS; DNQ	LVS; 18													21st	647	
1998	Info not available	Info not available				PHO; DNQ	CAL	HPT										21st	647	
1998	Info not available	43	Chevy						MMR; 8	AMP; 15	POR	CAL	PPR	EVG	SON	MMR; 9	LVS	21st	647	

=== ARCA Re/Max Series ===
(key) (Bold – Pole position awarded by qualifying time. Italics – Pole position earned by points standings or practice time. * – Most laps led.)

ARCA Re/Max Series results
Year	Team	No.	Make	1	2	3	4	5	6	7	8	9	10	11	12	13	14	15	16	17	18	19	20	21	22	ARSC	Pts	Ref
2002	Jason Rudd Racing	10	Ford	DAY	ATL	NSH	SLM	KEN	CLT	KAN	POC	MCH	TOL	SBO	KEN	BLN	POC	NSH	ISF	WIN	DSF	CHI	SLM	TAL; DNQ	CLT	N/A	0	
