= 1999 California's 42nd congressional district special election =

- November 16, 1999

California's 42nd congressional district
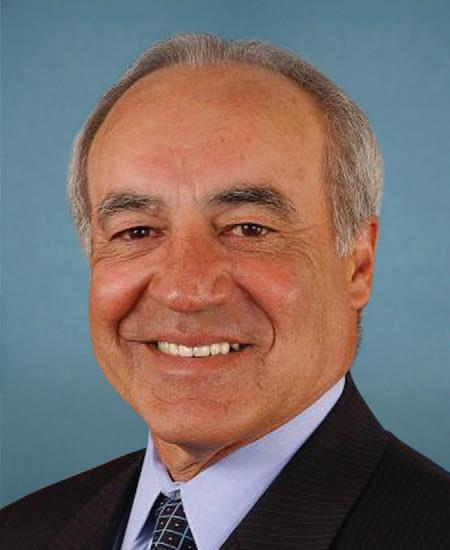

Nominee	Joe Baca	Elia Pirozzi
Party	Democratic	Republican
Popular vote	23,690	21,018
Percentage	50.55%	44.85%
U.S. Representative before election
George Brown Jr.
Democratic
Elected U.S. Representative
Joe Baca
Democratic

The 1999 California's 42nd congressional district special election took place on November 16, 1999, following the death of Democratic Congressman George Brown Jr. on July 15, 1999. The election took place using the blanket primary before it was struck down the following year in California Democratic Party v. Jones. Brown's widow, Marta Macias Brown, entered the race to succeed him as the frontrunner. However, State Senator Joe Baca narrowly won the Democratic nomination, receiving 32 percent of the vote to Brown's 30 percent.

In the general election, Baca faced attorney Elia Pirozzi, the Republican nominee, who had previously run against Brown in 1998. Though Republicans hoped to flip the seat, Baca ultimately defeated Pirozzi, 51–45 percent, in a low-turnout election.

== Primary election ==
=== Candidates ===
==== Democratic ====
- Joe Baca, State Senator
- Marta Macias Brown, widow of Congressman Brown
- David Eshleman, Mayor of Fontana
- Bernard McClay, businessman
- Don Hubner, real estate agent

==== Republican ====
- Elia Pirozzi, attorney, 1998 Republican nominee for Congress
- Rob Guzman, 1994 Republican nominee for Congress
- Hal Styles, securities broker

==== Reform ====
- Rick Simon, civil engineer

==== Libertarian ====
- Scott Ballard, electrician

=== Results ===
Primary election results
Party	Candidate	Votes	%
Democratic	Joe Baca	12,089	31.60%
Democratic	Marta Macias Brown	11,571	30.24%
Republican	Elia Pirozzi	10,526	27.51%
Democratic	David Eshleman	1,676	4.38%
Republican	Rob Guzman	736	1.92%
Republican	Hal Styles	572	1.49%
Reform	Rick Simon	375	0.98%
Libertarian	Scott Ballard	368	0.96%
Democratic	Bernard McClay	271	0.71%
Democratic	Don Hubner	78	0.20%
Total votes		38,262	100.00%

== General election ==
=== Candidates ===
- Joe Baca (Democratic)
- Elia Pirozzi (Republican)
- Rick Simon (Reform)
- Scott Ballard (Libertarian)

=== Results ===
1999 California's 42nd congressional district special election results
Party	Candidate	Votes	%
Democratic	Joe Baca	23,690	50.55%
Republican	Elia Pirozzi	21,018	44.85%
Reform	Rick Simon	1,198	2.56%
Libertarian	Scott Ballard	956	2.04%
Total votes		46,862	100.00%
Democratic hold			
