= Dion Ciccarelli =

American racing driver (born 1967)

- Born: December 13, 1967 (age 58); Severn, Maryland, U.S.

NASCAR O'Reilly Auto Parts Series career
- 10 races run over 4 years
- Best finish: 80th (2003)
- First race: 2001 MBNA.com 200 (Dover)
- Last race: 2004 Goulds Pumps/ITT Industries 200 (Nazareth)
Wins	Top tens	Poles
0	0	0

ARCA Menards Series career
- 6 races run over 2 years
- Best finish: 73rd (2001)
- First race: 2000 Bluegrass Quality Meats 200 (Kentucky)
- Last race: 2001 Food World 300 (Talladega)
Wins	Top tens	Poles
0	1	0
- Statistics up to date as of October 16, 2024.

Dion Ciccarelli (born December 13, 1967) is an American former professional stock car racing driver who competed in the NASCAR Busch Series and the ARCA Re/Max Series.

Ciccarelli has also competed in series like the now ARCA Menards Series East, the NASCAR Whelen Modified Tour and the NASCAR Goody's Dash Series.

== Motorsports results ==
=== NASCAR ===
(key) (Bold – Pole position awarded by qualifying time. Italics – Pole position earned by points standings or practice time. * – Most laps led.)

==== Busch Series ====
NASCAR Busch Series results
Year	Team	No.	Make	1	2	3	4	5	6	7	8	9	10	11	12	13	14	15	16	17	18	19	20	21	22	23	24	25	26	27	28	29	30	31	32	33	34	NBSC	Pts	Ref
2001	Glidden Motorsports	84	Ford	DAY	CAR	LVS	ATL	DAR	BRI	TEX	NSH	TAL	CAL	RCH	NHA	NZH	CLT	DOV	KEN	MLW	GLN	CHI	GTY	PPR	IRP	MCH	BRI	DAR	RCH; DNQ	DOV; 35	KAN	CLT	MEM	PHO	CAR	HOM; DNQ		125th	58	
2002	Glidden Motorsports	84	Ford	DAY	CAR	LVS; DNQ	DAR	BRI	TEX	NSH; 40	TAL	CAL	RCH; 35	NHA	NZH	CLT	DOV; 31	NSH	KEN; DNQ	MLW	DAY	CHI	GTY	PPR	IRP	MCH	BRI	DAR	RCH; DNQ	DOV; 37	KAN	CLT	MEM	ATL	CAR	PHO	HOM	82nd	223	
2003	Glidden Motorsports	04	Ford	DAY	CAR	LVS	DAR; 24	BRI	TEX	TAL	NSH; DNQ	CAL					DOV; 24	NSH	KEN	MLW	DAY	CHI	NHA	PPR														80th	304	
2003	Glidden Motorsports	84	Chevy										RCH; DNQ	GTY	NZH	CLT																						80th	304	
2003	Glidden Motorsports	84	Ford																						IRP; 26	MCH	BRI; DNQ	DAR	RCH; DNQ	DOV; 42	KAN	CLT	MEM	ATL	PHO	CAR; DNQ	HOM	80th	304	
2004	Glidden Motorsports	84	Ford	DAY	CAR	LVS	DAR	BRI	TEX	NSH	TAL	CAL	GTY; DNQ	RCH	NZH; 29	CLT	DOV; DNQ	NSH	KEN	MLW	DAY	CHI	NHA; DNQ	PPR	IRP	MCH	BRI	CAL	RCH	DOV; DNQ	KAN	CLT	MEM	ATL	PHO	DAR; DNQ	HOM; DNQ	128th	76	

==== Busch East Series ====
NASCAR Busch East Series results
Year	Team	No.	Make	1	2	3	4	5	6	7	8	9	10	11	12	13	NBESC	Pts	Ref
2005	Jamerson Motorsports	84	Ford	STA	HOL	ERI	NHA; 23	WFD	ADI	STA	DUB	OXF	NHA; 23	DOV; 16	LRP	TMP; DNQ	36th	370	
2006	Jamerson Motorsports	84	Ford	GRE; 13	STA; 12	HOL; 24	TMP; 16	ERI; 17	NHA; 21	ADI; 13	WFD; 10	NHA; 24	DOV; 19	LRP; 19			12th	1230	
2007	Jamerson Motorsports	84	Chevy	GRE; 22	ELK; DNQ	IOW; 9	SBO; 17	STA; 20	NHA; 22	TMP; 19	NSH; 28	ADI; 6	LRP; 20	MFD; 25	NHA; 37	DOV; 16	18th	1262	

==== Goody's Dash Series ====
NASCAR Goody's Dash Series results
Year	Team	No.	Make	1	2	3	4	5	6	7	8	9	10	11	12	13	14	NGDS	Pts	Ref
2002	N/A	0	Pontiac	DAY	HAR	ROU	LON	CLT	KEN; 26	MEM	GRE	SNM	SBO	MYB	BRI	MOT	ATL	75th	85	

==== Whelen Modified Tour ====
NASCAR Whelen Modified Tour results
Year	Car owner	No.	Make	1	2	3	4	5	6	7	8	9	10	11	12	13	14	15	16	NWMTC	Pts	Ref
2008	N/A	18	Chevy	TMP	STA	STA	TMP	NHA	SPE	RIV	STA	TMP	MAN; 29	TMP	NHA	MAR	CHE	STA	TMP; DNQ	51st	125	

=== ARCA Re/Max Series ===
(key) (Bold – Pole position awarded by qualifying time. Italics – Pole position earned by points standings or practice time. * – Most laps led. ** – All laps led.)

ARCA Re/Max Series results
Year	Team	No.	Make	1	2	3	4	5	6	7	8	9	10	11	12	13	14	15	16	17	18	19	20	21	22	23	24	25	ARMSC	Pts	Ref
2000	Richard Williams	94	Ford	DAY	SLM	AND	CLT; DNQ	KIL	FRS	MCH	POC	TOL	KEN	BLN	POC	WIN	ISF	KEN; 25	DSF	SLM	CLT	TAL	ATL; DNQ						112th	130	
2001	Richard Williams	94	Ford	DAY; 18									POC; 29	MEM	GLN	KEN	MCH	POC; 9	NSH	ISF	CHI	DSF	SLM	TOL	BLN	CLT			73rd		
2001	Bobby Gerhart Racing	5	Ford		NSH; 38	WIN	SLM	GTY	KEN	CLT	KAN	MCH																	73rd		
2001	Steele Racing	16	Ford																								TAL; 40	ATL	73rd		
