= McGill Motorsports =

Former NASCAR team

- Owners: John McGill; Nancy McGill
- Base: Statesville, North Carolina
- Series: Nationwide Series
- Race drivers: Jeremy Clements; Steve Grissom; Stanton Barrett; Brent Sherman; Tim Sauter
- Manufacturer: Chevrolet
- Opened: 2003
- Closed: 2007
- Website: www.mcgillmotorsports.com

Career
- Debut: 2005 Hershey's Take 5 300 (Daytona)
- Latest race: 2007 Ford 300 (Homestead)
- Races competed: 104
- Drivers' Championships: 0
- Race victories: 0
- Pole positions: 0

McGill Motorsports was a NASCAR Busch Series team owned by John and Nancy McGill. It fielded the No. 36 Chevy for a few years.

The team debuted in 2003 as DCT Motorsports with Steve Grissom driving the No. 61 Chevrolet in three races. For their final two races of the season they changed their number and ran the No. 36 Chevrolet. DCT would post its best finish of the season at Richmond, a 14th-place finish. In 2004, Steve Grissom and Travis Geisler shared the driving duties at the start of the season. Grissom left the team in May 2004 and Geisler took over full-time driving duties for the team. Stanton Barrett drove in the last three races of the season. Grissom had the best finish of the year for the team, when he finished 11th at Rockingham.

For the 2005 season, Stanton Barrett returned to the team and ran the first 26 races with DCT. T. J. Bell then took over the car for eight races and Tim Sauter ran the final race of the season. Barrett gave DCT its first ever top ten finish when he finished 10th at New Hampshire. That would also be the best finish for the team during the year. In 2006, the team changed their name to McGill Motorsports and Sauter returned to drive the full schedule. Lester Buildings also joined the team as the primary sponsor for 25 races. Sauter ran 23 races but did not finish in the top ten. In August, Max Papis and Jeff Green filled in for Sauter, who claimed that McGill was punishing him for a rules infraction earlier in the month. He left the team with three races to go in the season. and Papis and Brent Sherman finished out the final two races of the season. Sherman drove for the team full-time in 2007 with sponsorship from Big Lots, but after failing to finish in the top-ten, resigned from the team. He was replaced by ARCA RE/MAX Series driver Jeremy Clements starting at Charlotte. After the season, team crew chief Ricky Pearson told the press that McGill would not participate in the 2008 season due to a lack of sponsorship. They will sell off their remaining equipment on July 8, 2008

== Car No. 36 results ==
Year	Driver	No.	Make	1	2	3	4	5	6	7	8	9	10	11	12	13	14	15	16	17	18	19	20	21	22	23	24	25	26	27	28	29	30	31	32	33	34	35	Owners	Pts
2003	Toby Porter	61	Pontiac	DAY; 26	CAR	LVS	DAR	BRI	TEX	TAL	NSH	CAL	RCH	GTY	NZH	CLT	DOV	NSH	KEN	MLW																			64th	367
2003	Steve Grissom	61	Pontiac																		DAY; 29	CHI	NHA	PPR	IRP	MCH	BRI; 26	DAR											64th	367
2003	Steve Grissom	61	Chevy																										RCH; 14	DOV	KAN								64th	367
2003	Steve Grissom	36	Chevy																													CLT; 28	MEM	ATL	PHO	CAR	HOM; 30		64th	367
2004	Steve Grissom	36	Chevy	DAY; 25	CAR; 11	LVS; 32	DAR; 24	BRI; 15	TEX		TAL; 18	CAL			NZH; 20	CLT; 38	DOV																						30th	2057
2004	Travis Geisler	36	Chevy							NSH; 24			GTY; 40	RCH; 26				NSH; 21	KEN; 39	MLW	DAY	CHI; 23	NHA	PPR; 22	IRP	MCH; 22	BRI; 30	CAL	RCH; 23	DOV	KAN; 27	CLT; DNQ	MEM; 21						30th	2057
2004	Stanton Barrett	36	Chevy																															ATL; 24	PHO	DAR; 18	HOM; 23		30th	2057
2005	Stanton Barrett	36	Chevy	DAY; 29	CAL; 33	MXC; 19	LVS; 26	ATL; 26	NSH; 39	BRI; 37	TEX; 24		TAL; 23	DAR; 16		CLT; 21	DOV; 22	NSH; 26	KEN; 17		DAY; 35	CHI; 26		PPR; 19	GTY; 39		GLN; 38	MCH; 38											29th	2765
2005	Stanton Barrett	36	Pontiac									PHO; 12			RCH; 19					MLW; 21			NHA; 10			IRP; 36			BRI; 42										29th	2765
2005	T. J. Bell	36	Chevy																											CAL; 38	RCH; 24	DOV; 22	KAN; 35	CLT; 34	MEM; 41	TEX; 34	PHO; 36		29th	2765
2005	Tim Sauter	36	Chevy																																			HOM; 30	29th	2765
2006	Tim Sauter	36	Chevy	DAY; 19	CAL; 25	MXC; 30	LVS; 41	ATL; 31	BRI; 21	TEX; 37	NSH; 36	PHO; 24	TAL; 21	RCH; 39	DAR; 37	CLT; 27	DOV; 28	NSH; 24	KEN; 28	MLW; 27	DAY; 24	CHI; 33	NHA; 26	MAR; 19	GTY; 22	IRP; 33			BRI; 34		RCH; 35	DOV; 28	KAN; 25	CLT; DNQ	MEM; 31				33rd	2,608
2006	Max Papis	36	Chevy																								GLN; 14									TEX; 40			33rd	2,608
2006	Jeff Green	36	Chevy																									MCH; 22											33rd	2,608
2006	Stanton Barrett	36	Chevy																											CAL; 32									33rd	2,608
2006	Brent Sherman	36	Chevy																																		PHO; 28	HOM; 34	33rd	2,608
2007	Brent Sherman	36	Chevy	DAY; 21	CAL; 27	MXC; 15	LVS; 39	ATL; 26	BRI; 37	NSH; 20	TEX; 37	PHO; 26	TAL; 16	RCH; 31	DAR; 35	CLT; 35	DOV; 35	NSH; 21	KEN; 24	MLW; 32	NHA; 31	DAY; 24	CHI; 40	GTY; 25	IRP; 33	CGV; 22	GLN; 30	MCH; 40	BRI; 31	CAL; 22	RCH; 34	DOV; 43	KAN; 27						33rd	2,578
2007	Jeremy Clements	36	Chevy																															CLT; 23	MEM; 40	TEX; 42	PHO; 38	HOM; 27	33rd	2,578
