= Butch Jarvis =

American racing driver

- Born: January 31, 1962 (age 64); Blountville, Tennessee, U.S.

NASCAR O'Reilly Auto Parts Series career
- 2 races run over 3 years
- Best finish: 122nd (2004)
- First race: 2004 Goulds Pumps/ITT Industries 200 (Nazareth)
- Last race: 2004 Alan Kulwicki 250 (Milwaukee)
Wins	Top tens	Poles
0	0	0

ARCA Menards Series career
- 6 races run over 8 years
- Best finish: 69th (2009)
- First race: 2003 EasyCare Vehicle Service Contracts 150 (Charlotte)
- Last race: 2010 Lucas Oil Slick Mist 200 (Daytona)
Wins	Top tens	Poles
0	0	0
- Statistics up to date as of June 14, 2024.

Butch Jarvis (born January 31, 1962) is an American former professional stock car racing driver who competed in the NASCAR Busch Series and the ARCA Racing Series.

Jarvis made six starts in the ARCA Racing Series between 2003 and 2010, primarily with Wayne Peterson Racing, getting a best finish of seventeenth at Daytona International Speedway in 2007.

Jarvis also made two starts in the NASCAR Busch Series for Tennessee Mountain Boys Racing in the No. 53 Pontiac, finishing 40th at Nazareth Speedway, and 39th at the Milwaukee Mile.

== Motorsports results ==
=== NASCAR ===
(key) (Bold – Pole position awarded by qualifying time. Italics – Pole position earned by points standings or practice time. * – Most laps led.)

==== Busch Series ====
NASCAR Busch Series results
Year	Team	No.	Make	1	2	3	4	5	6	7	8	9	10	11	12	13	14	15	16	17	18	19	20	21	22	23	24	25	26	27	28	29	30	31	32	33	34	NBSC	Pts	Ref
2002	Tennessee Mountain Boys Racing	53	Chevy	DAY	CAR	LVS	DAR	BRI	TEX	NSH	TAL	CAL	RCH	NHA	NZH	CLT	DOV	NSH	KEN	MLW	DAY	CHI	GTY	PPR	IRP	MCH	BRI; DNQ	DAR	RCH	DOV	KAN	CLT	MEM; DNQ	ATL	CAR	PHO	HOM	N/A	0	
2003	Tennessee Mountain Boys Racing	53	Pontiac	DAY	CAR	LVS	DAR	BRI	TEX	TAL	NSH	CAL	RCH	GTY	NZH	CLT	DOV	NSH	KEN	MLW	DAY	CHI	NHA	PPR	IRP	MCH	BRI; DNQ	DAR	RCH	DOV	KAN	CLT	MEM; DNQ	ATL	PHO	CAR	HOM	N/A	0	
2004	Tennessee Mountain Boys Racing	53	Pontiac	DAY	CAR	LVS	DAR	BRI; DNQ	TEX	NSH	TAL	CAL	GTY												IRP; DNQ	MCH	BRI	CAL	RCH	DOV	KAN	CLT	MEM	ATL	PHO	DAR	HOM	122nd	80	
2004	Tennessee Mountain Boys Racing	53	Chevy											RCH; DNQ	NZH; 40	CLT	DOV	NSH	KEN	MLW; 39	DAY	CHI	NHA	PPR														122nd	80	

=== ARCA Racing Series ===
(key) (Bold – Pole position awarded by qualifying time. Italics – Pole position earned by points standings or practice time. * – Most laps led.)

ARCA Racing Series results
Year	Team	No.	Make	1	2	3	4	5	6	7	8	9	10	11	12	13	14	15	16	17	18	19	20	21	22	23	ARSC	Pts	Ref
2003	Wayne Peterson Racing	6	Chevy	DAY	ATL	NSH	SLM	TOL	KEN	CLT	BLN	KAN	MCH	LER	POC	POC	NSH	ISF	WIN	DSF	CHI	SLM	TAL	CLT; 31	SBO		175th	75	
2004	Wayne Peterson Racing	6	Chevy	DAY; DNQ	NSH	SLM	KEN	TOL	CLT	KAN	POC	MCH	SBO	BLN	KEN	GTW	POC	LER	NSH	ISF	TOL	DSF	CHI	SLM	TAL		N/A	0	
2005	Wayne Peterson Racing	06	Chevy	DAY; DNQ	NSH; DNQ																					TAL; DNQ	N/A	0	
2005	Wayne Peterson Racing	06	Pontiac			SLM; DNQ	KEN; DNQ	TOL	LAN	MIL	POC	MCH	KAN	KEN	BLN	POC	GTW	LER	NSH	MCH	ISF	TOL	DSF	CHI	SLM		N/A	0	
2006	Butch Jarvis Racing	16	Chevy	DAY; DNQ	NSH	SLM	WIN	KEN	TOL																		N/A	0	
2006	Norm Benning Racing	8	Chevy							POC; DNQ	MCH	KAN	KEN	BLN	POC	GTW	NSH; DNQ	MCH	ISF	MIL	TOL	DSF	CHI	SLM	TAL	IOW	N/A	0	
2007	Wayne Peterson Racing	0	Chevy	DAY; 17	USA	NSH	SLM	KAN	WIN	KEN	TOL	IOW	POC	MCH	BLN	KEN	POC	NSH	ISF	MIL	GTW	DSF	CHI	SLM	TAL; DNQ	TOL	122nd	170	
2008	Wayne Peterson Racing	0	Chevy	DAY; DNQ	SLM	IOW	KAN	CAR	KEN	TOL	POC	MCH	CAY	KEN	BLN	POC	NSH	ISF	DSF	CHI	SLM	NJE	TAL	TOL			N/A	0	
2009	Wayne Peterson Racing	0	Dodge	DAY; DNQ			TAL; 40																				69th	420	
2009	Wayne Peterson Racing	0	Chevy		SLM; DNQ	CAR; 40		KEN; 34	TOL	POC	MCH	MFD	IOW	KEN	BLN	POC	ISF	CHI	TOL	DSF	NJE	SLM	KAN	CAR			69th	420	
2010	Wayne Peterson Racing	0	Dodge	DAY; 41	PBE	SLM	TEX	TAL	TOL	POC	MCH	IOW	MFD	POC	BLN	NJE	ISF	CHI	DSF	TOL	SLM	KAN					131st	55	
2010	Wayne Peterson Racing	0	Chevy																				CAR; DNQ				131st	55	
