= Clint Vahsholtz =

American racing driver (born 1971)

- Born: Clinton Vahsholtz; March 14, 1971 (age 55) Woodland Park, Colorado, U.S.

NASCAR West Series career
- Debut season: 2002
- Former teams: Vahsholtz Racing, Chris Diederich Racing
- Starts: 11
- Wins: 0
- Poles: 0
- Best finish: 20th in 2002
- Finished last season: 45th (2005)

Previous series
- 2002–2003: ARCA Re/Max Series

NASCAR O'Reilly Auto Parts Series career
- 5 races run over 3 years
- 2004 position: N/A
- Best finish: 90th (2004)
- First race: 2003 Sam's Town 300 (Las Vegas)
- Last race: 2004 Goulds Pumps/ITT Industries Salute to the Troops 250 (Pikes Peak)
Wins	Top tens	Poles
0	0	0
- Statistics up to date as of July 24, 2020.

Clinton Vahsholtz (born March 14, 1971) is an American former stock car racing driver. He competed in the NASCAR Busch Series from 2003 to 2005.

== Racing career ==
=== Stock car racing ===
Vahsholtz made his NASCAR debut in 2003, when he drove the No. 39 Jay Robinson Racing Ford at Las Vegas. He started the race in 31st and fell to 40th after an early engine issue. Vahsholtz then moved to his own No. 90 Ford for the race at Pikes Peak. He finished in 18th position despite being four laps down.

Vahsholtz had another top-20 finish in his first 2004 outing, which came at Nashville. In that race, he finished in the 19th position. JRR called upon him again at Kentucky, when he drove their No. 49 Ford to a 36th-place finish, plagued by engine problems. Vahsholtz went back to his own team in his 2004 finale at Pikes Peak. He got a career best start of 21st out of it, but crashed halfway through and finished 33rd.

=== Pikes Peak ===
Vahsholtz is known for his results and records at Pikes Peak. He has appeared at every Pikes Peak International Hill Climb since 1992. He took part in 30 events and won his division on 24 occasions, and 1 King of the Mountain, making him the most successful driver in the history of the Pikes Peak International Hill Climb. He currently holds the record for Super Stock Cars and Open Wheels. His first attempt at the peak was in 1992 in Pro Motorcycle Division.

Pikes Peak Results:

Year	Division	Position	Make	Finish Time
1992	Pro Motorcycle	2nd		12:58.06
1993	Pro Motorcycle	1st	Wood/Rotax	12:29.38 (MR)
1994	Pro Motorcycle	1st	Wood/Rotax 600	12:21.13 (MR)
1995	Pro Motorcycle	1st	1992 Wood-Rotax 600	9:17.10 (SH)
1996	Super Stock Car	1st	96 Ford	12:10:83
1997	Super Stock Car	1st	96 Ford Mustang	11:46:47
1998	Super Stock Car	1st	96 Ford Mustang	11:55:09
1999	Super Stock Car	1st	96 Ford Mustang	11:49:06
2000	Super Stock Car	1st	96 Ford Mustang	12:04:66
2001	Super Stock Car	1st	00 Ford	11:49:61
2002	Super Stock Car	1st	00 Ford	11:53:00
2003	Super Stock Car	1st	2001 Ford Mustang	11:43:90
2004	Super Stock Car	1st	Ford Mustang	5:21:28 (SH)
2005	Super Stock Car	1st	2002 Ford Mustang	11:58:40
2006	Super Stock Car	1st	2004 Ford	12:16:395
2007	Super Stock Car	DNF	2005 Ford Mustang	DNF
2008	Super Stock Car	1st	2002 Ford Mustang	11:45:499
2009	Super Stock Car	1st	2002 Ford Mustang	11:39:662
2010	Super Stock Car	1st	Ford Mustang	11:33:320 (DR)
2011	Super Stock Car	1st	2006 Ford Mustang	10:55:603 (DR)
2012	Super Stock Car	1st	2006 Ford Mustang	4:36:870 (SH)
2013	Open Wheel	1st	2013 Ford Open	11:07:305
2014	Open Wheel	1st	2013 Ford Open	9:54:700 (DRP)
2015	Open Wheel	3rd	2013 Ford Open	9:55:479
2016	Open Wheel	1st	2013 Ford Open	9:54:050
2017	Open Wheel	1st	2013 Ford Open	9:35:747 (CRP)
2018	Time Attach 1	2nd	2014 McLaren	9:52:748
2019	Time Attack 1	2nd	2014 McLaren 650s	9:48:716
2020	Open wheel	1st	2013 Ford Open	9:35:490 (King Of The Mountain)
2023	Time attack 1	DNF	2016 KTM X BOW	DNF

== Personal life ==
Vahsholtz attended Woodland Park High School, where he met his high school sweetheart. He lives in Woodland Park, Colorado, where he operates his own automotive repair business.

== Motorsports career results ==
=== NASCAR ===
(key) (Bold – Pole position awarded by qualifying time. Italics – Pole position earned by points standings or practice time. * – Most laps led.)

==== Busch Series ====
NASCAR Busch Series results
Year	Team	No.	Make	1	2	3	4	5	6	7	8	9	10	11	12	13	14	15	16	17	18	19	20	21	22	23	24	25	26	27	28	29	30	31	32	33	34	35	NBSC	Pts	Ref
2003	Jay Robinson Racing	39	Ford	DAY	CAR	LVS; 40	DAR	BRI	TEX	TAL	NSH	CAL	RCH	GTY	NZH	CLT	DOV	NSH	KEN	MLW	DAY	CHI	NHA														HOM; DNQ		105th	152	
2003	Vahsholtz Racing	90	Ford																					PPR; 18	IRP	MCH	BRI	DAR	RCH	DOV	KAN	CLT	MEM	ATL	PHO; DNQ	CAR			105th	152	
2004	Vahsholtz Racing	90	Ford	DAY	CAR	LVS	DAR	BRI	TEX	NSH	TAL	CAL	GTY	RCH	NZH	CLT	DOV	NSH; 19						PPR; 33	IRP	MCH	BRI	CAL	RCH	DOV	KAN; DNQ	CLT	MEM	ATL	PHO; DNQ	DAR	HOM		90th	225	
2004	Jay Robinson Racing	49	Ford																KEN; 36	MLW	DAY	CHI	NHA																90th	225	
2005	Vahsholtz Racing	90	Ford	DAY	CAL	MXC	LVS	ATL	NSH	BRI	TEX	PHO	TAL	DAR	RCH	CLT	DOV	NSH	KEN	MLW	DAY	CHI	NHA	PPR; DNQ	GTY	IRP	GLN	MCH	BRI	CAL	RCH	DOV	KAN	CLT	MEM	TEX	PHO	HOM	N/A	0	

==== West Series ====
NASCAR West Series results
Year	Team	No.	Make	1	2	3	4	5	6	7	8	9	10	11	12	NWSC	Pts	Ref
2002	Vahsholtz Racing	90	Ford	PHO	LVS; 15	CAL	KAN	EVG	IRW; 21	S99	RMR; 18	DCS	LVS; 13			20th	545	
2003	Vahsholtz Racing	90	Ford	PHO; 10	LVS	CAL	MAD	TCR	EVG	IRW	S99	RMR	DCS	PHO	MMR	44th	134	
2005	Chris Diederich Racing	26	Ford	PHO	MMR	PHO	S99	IRW	EVG	S99	PPR; 11	CAL	DCS	CTS	MMR	45th	130	

=== ARCA Re/Max Series ===
(key) (Bold – Pole position awarded by qualifying time. Italics – Pole position earned by points standings or practice time. * – Most laps led.)

ARCA Re/Max Series results
Year	Team	No.	Make	1	2	3	4	5	6	7	8	9	10	11	12	13	14	15	16	17	18	19	20	21	22	ARMC	Pts	Ref
2002	Vahsholtz Racing	11	Ford	DAY	ATL	NSH	SLM	KEN	CLT	KAN; 13	POC	MCH	TOL	SBO	KEN	BLN	POC	NSH	ISF	WIN	DSF	CHI	SLM	TAL	CLT	124th	165	
2003	Vahsholtz Racing	7	Ford	DAY	ATL	NSH; 8	SLM	TOL	KEN	CLT	BLN	KAN; 37	MCH	LER	POC	POC	NSH; 16	ISF	WIN	DSF	CHI; 10	SLM	TAL	CLT	SBO	55th	565	
