= 2004 NASCAR Busch Series =

American motorsport season

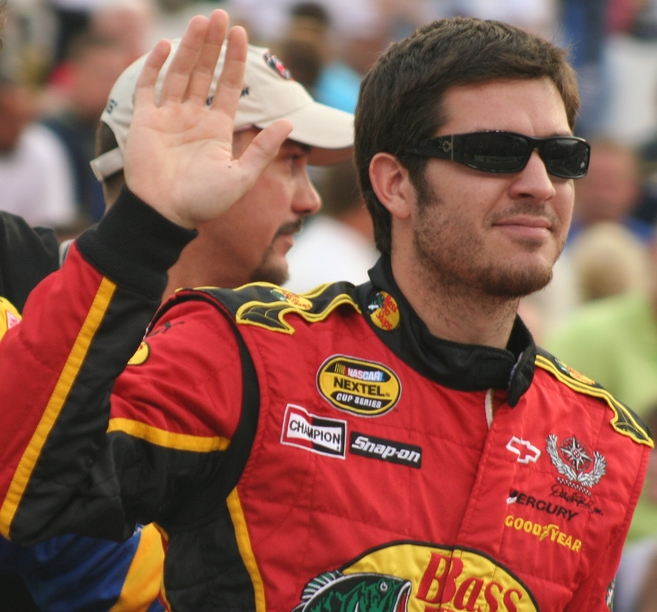
Martin Truex Jr., the 2004 Busch Series champion

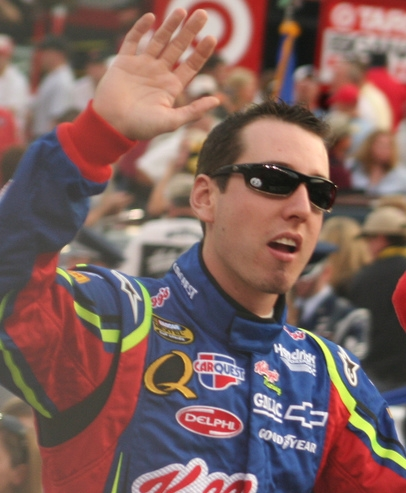
Kyle Busch, the 2004 Busch Series runner-up and rookie of the year.

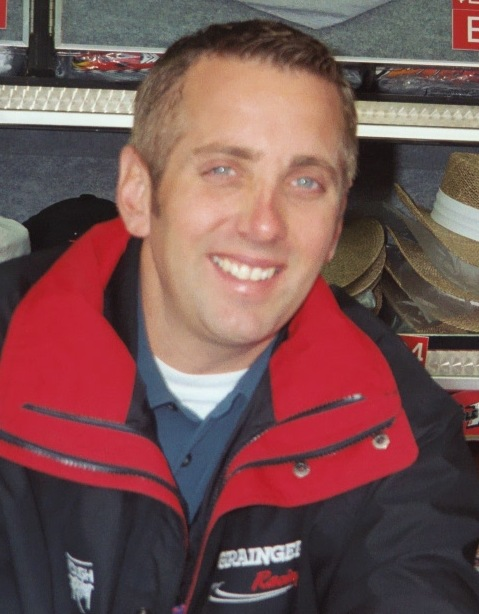
Greg Biffle, finished third in points

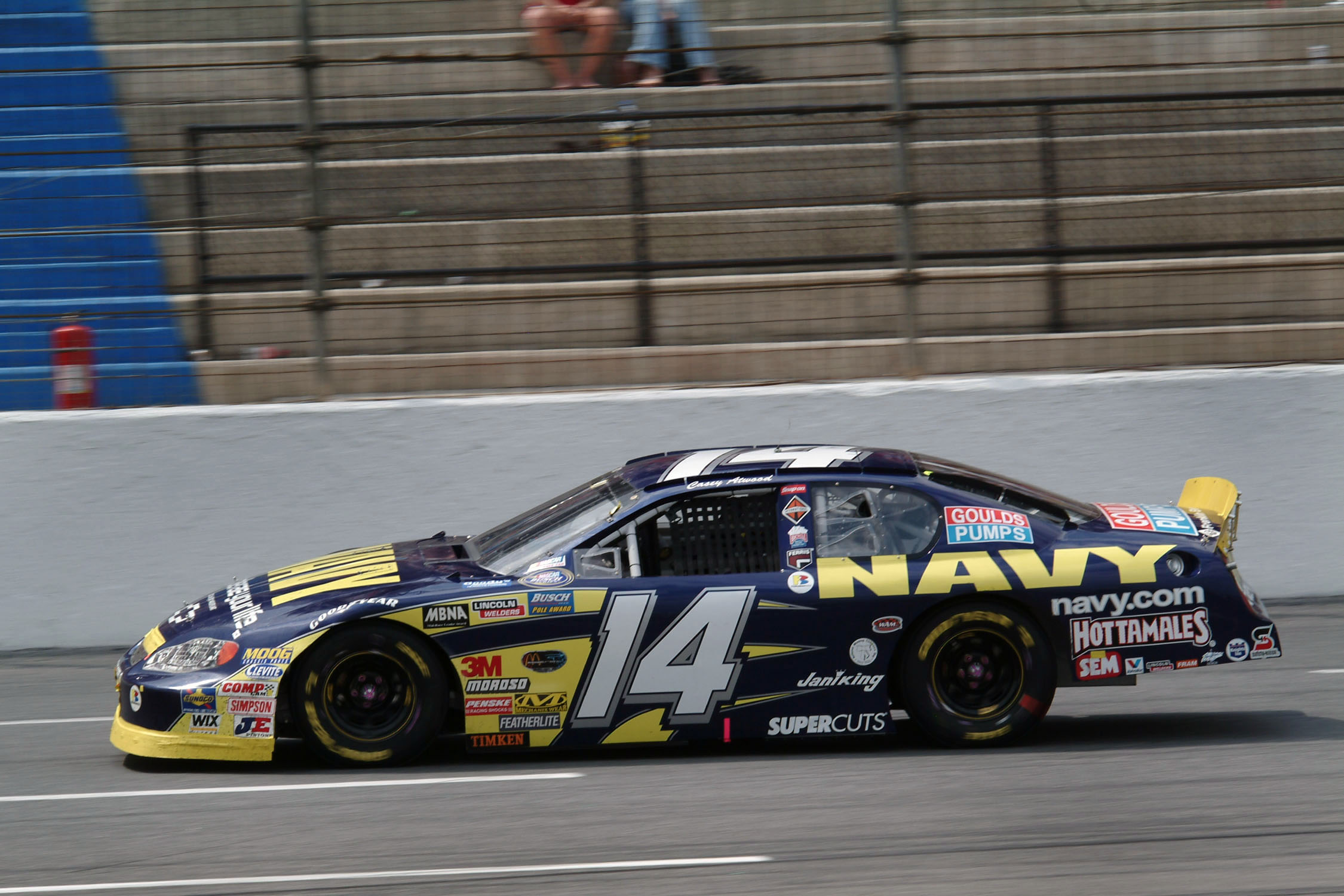
Chevrolet won the Busch series manufacturer's championship again.

The 2004 NASCAR Busch Series began on February 14 and ended on November 20. Martin Truex Jr. of Chance 2 Motorsports won the championship.

== Teams and drivers ==
=== Full schedule ===
Manufacturer	Team	No.	Driver	Crew chief
Chevrolet	Bill Davis Racing	23	Kenny Wallace	Chris Rice
Chevrolet	Chance 2 Motorsports	8	Dale Earnhardt Jr. 1	Kevin Manion
Chevrolet	Chance 2 Motorsports	8	Martin Truex Jr. 33	Kevin Manion
Chevrolet	Davis Motorsports	10	Jason Schuler 6	Bob Good
Chevrolet	Davis Motorsports	10	Gus Wasson 27	Bob Good
Chevrolet	Davis Motorsports	10	Tina Gordon 1	Bob Good
Chevrolet	FitzBradshaw Racing	12	Tim Fedewa	Gary Cogswell 19; Scott Reifner; Dave Fuge; Mike Hillman Sr. Steve Plattenberger
Chevrolet	FitzBradshaw Racing	14	Casey Atwood 29	Jay Guy
Chevrolet	FitzBradshaw Racing	14	Dave Blaney 1	Jay Guy
Chevrolet	FitzBradshaw Racing	14	David Stremme 4	Jay Guy
Chevrolet	Haas CNC Racing	00	Jason Leffler 27	Bootie Barker 30; Bill Ingle 3 Bryant Frazier 1
Chevrolet	Haas CNC Racing	00	Blake Feese 4	Bootie Barker 30; Bill Ingle 3 Bryant Frazier 1
Chevrolet	Haas CNC Racing	00	Tony Raines 1	Bootie Barker 30; Bill Ingle 3 Bryant Frazier 1
Chevrolet	Haas CNC Racing	00	Justin Labonte 2	Bootie Barker 30; Bill Ingle 3 Bryant Frazier 1
Chevrolet	Hendrick Motorsports	5	Kyle Busch (R)	Lance McGrew
Chevrolet	Joe Gibbs Racing	20	Mike Bliss	Steve Addington
Chevrolet	Lewis Motorsports	46	Ashton Lewis Jr.	Charlie Lewis
Chevrolet	MacDonald Motorsports	72	Larry Gunselman 3	Cliff Button
Chevrolet	MacDonald Motorsports	72	Jason White 4	Cliff Button
Chevrolet	MacDonald Motorsports	72	Lance Hooper 1	Cliff Button
Chevrolet	MacDonald Motorsports	72	Randy MacDonald 6	Cliff Button
Chevrolet	MacDonald Motorsports	72	Jerry Hill 2	Cliff Button
Chevrolet	MacDonald Motorsports	72	Kevin Lepage 10	Cliff Button
Chevrolet	MacDonald Motorsports	72	Jamie Mosley 1	Cliff Button
Chevrolet	MacDonald Motorsports	72	John Graham 4	Cliff Button
Chevrolet	MacDonald Motorsports	72	Bill Eversole 1	Cliff Button
Chevrolet	MacDonald Motorsports	72	Stan Boyd (R) 2	Cliff Button
Chevrolet	Richard Childress Racing	2	Ron Hornaday Jr.	Butch Hylton
Chevrolet	Richard Childress Racing	21	Kevin Harvick 20	Ricky Viers
Chevrolet	Richard Childress Racing	21	Clint Bowyer (R) 14	Ricky Viers
Dodge	Akins Motorsports	38	Kasey Kahne 30	Paul Andrews
Dodge	Akins Motorsports	38	Shane Hmiel 2	Paul Andrews
Dodge	Akins Motorsports	38	Tyler Walker 2	Paul Andrews
Dodge	Braun Racing	32	David Stremme 30	Randy Cox
Dodge	Braun Racing	32	Shane Hmiel 4	Randy Cox
Dodge	Phoenix Racing	1	Johnny Benson 10	Jon Wolfe
Dodge	Phoenix Racing	1	Jamie McMurray 4	Jon Wolfe
Dodge	Phoenix Racing	1	Jeff Purvis 1	Jon Wolfe
Dodge	Phoenix Racing	1	Buckshot Jones 2	Jon Wolfe
Dodge	Phoenix Racing	1	Tony Raines 1	Jon Wolfe
Dodge	Phoenix Racing	1	Casey Mears 11	Jon Wolfe
Dodge	Phoenix Racing	1	Regan Smith 1	Jon Wolfe
Dodge	Phoenix Racing	1	Bobby Hamilton 1	Jon Wolfe
Dodge	Phoenix Racing	1	Sterling Marlin 2	Jon Wolfe
Dodge	Phoenix Racing	1	Reed Sorenson 1	Jon Wolfe
Ford	Biagi Brothers Racing	4	Mike Wallace	Tony Lambert
Ford	Jay Robinson Racing	39	Robby Benton 1	Kenneth Campbell
Ford	Jay Robinson Racing	39	Andy Ponstein (R) 10	Kenneth Campbell
Ford	Jay Robinson Racing	39	Brad Teague 1	Kenneth Campbell
Ford	Jay Robinson Racing	39	Jimmy Kitchens 1	Kenneth Campbell
Ford	Jay Robinson Racing	39	Mark Green 4	Kenneth Campbell
Ford	Jay Robinson Racing	39	Tina Gordon 17	Kenneth Campbell
Ford	Jay Robinson Racing	49	Derrike Cope 31 (Note: Derrike Cope was injured after a crash in practice and was replaced by Josh Richeson in the No. 49 in the race at Gateway (race #10).)	Jay Robinson
Ford	Jay Robinson Racing	49	Josh Richeson 1	Jay Robinson
Ford	Jay Robinson Racing	49	Mark Green 2	Jay Robinson
Ford	Jay Robinson Racing	49	Clint Vahsholtz 1	Jay Robinson
Ford	ppc Racing	22	Jason Keller	Wes Ward
Ford	Roush Racing	60	Greg Biffle	Brad Parrott
Ford	ST Motorsports	47	Robert Pressley	Dan Deeringhoff
Ford	ST Motorsports	59	Stacy Compton	Chris Carrier
Ford	Team Rensi Motorsports	25	Bobby Hamilton Jr. 23	Harold Holly
Ford	Team Rensi Motorsports	25	Mike McLaughlin 11	Harold Holly
Pontiac Chevrolet	Brewco Motorsports	27	Johnny Sauter	Newt Moore
Pontiac Chevrolet	Brewco Motorsports	37	David Green	Jason Ratcliff
Pontiac Chevrolet	NEMCO Motorsports	88	Wally Dallenbach Jr. 1	David Hatfield; Johnny Vermillion
Pontiac Chevrolet	NEMCO Motorsports	88	Jeff Fuller 32	David Hatfield; Johnny Vermillion
Pontiac Chevrolet	NEMCO Motorsports	88	Joe Nemechek 1	David Hatfield; Johnny Vermillion

=== Limited schedule ===
- Henderson Motorsports (the No. 75 car, driven by Jay Sauter) and Henderson Racing (the No. 63 car, driven by Jimmy Henderson) are two different teams.

Manufacturer	Team	No.	Driver	Crew chief	Rounds
Chevrolet	Andy Petree Racing	33	Paul Menard (R)	Chris Carrier	14
Chevrolet	Andy Petree Racing	33	Clint Bowyer (R)	Chris Carrier	1
Chevrolet	Kevin Harvick, Inc.	33	Clint Bowyer (R)	Ed Berrier	2
Chevrolet	Kevin Harvick, Inc.	33	Tony Raines	Ed Berrier	1
Chevrolet	Kevin Harvick, Inc.	92	Tony Stewart	Wally Rogers	1
Chevrolet	BACE Motorsports	74	Damon Lusk	Mark Tutor	4
Chevrolet	BACE Motorsports	74	Tony Raines	Mark Tutor	15
Chevrolet	BACE Motorsports	74	Tyler Walker	Mark Tutor	1
Chevrolet	BACE Motorsports	74	Jimmy Spencer	Mark Tutor	3
Chevrolet	Cam Strader Racing	06	Cam Strader	Patrick Donahue	1
Chevrolet	Chance 2 Motorsports	11	Paul Menard (R)	Tony Gibson	15
Chevrolet	Chance 2 Motorsports	81	Martin Truex Jr.	Pete Rondeau	1
Chevrolet	Chance 2 Motorsports	81	Dale Earnhardt Jr.	Pete Rondeau	3
Chevrolet	Chance 2 Motorsports	81	Tony Stewart	Pete Rondeau	2
Chevrolet	Competitive Edge Motorsports	32	Mike Garvey	Shane Tesch	2
Chevrolet	Conz-Diaz Champion Racing	05	Brian Conz	David Leiner Jr.	1
Chevrolet	Davis Motorsports	0	Jimmy Kitchens	Ronnie Griffin	4
Chevrolet	Davis Motorsports	0	Mike Potter	Ronnie Griffin	5
Chevrolet	Davis Motorsports	0	Blake Mallory	Ronnie Griffin	1
Chevrolet	Davis Motorsports	0	Greg Sacks	Ronnie Griffin	2
Chevrolet	Davis Motorsports	0	Gus Wasson	Ronnie Griffin	1
Chevrolet	Davis Motorsports	0	David Keith	Ronnie Griffin	2
Chevrolet	Davis Motorsports	0	Brad Teague	Ronnie Griffin	2
Chevrolet	Davis Motorsports	0	Kertus Davis	Ronnie Griffin	7
Chevrolet	Davis Motorsports	0	Morgan Shepherd	Ronnie Griffin	1
Chevrolet	Davis Motorsports	70	Wayne Edwards	Johnny Davis	1
Chevrolet	Davis Motorsports	70	Stan Boyd (R)	Johnny Davis	1
Chevrolet	Day Enterprise Racing	16	Justin Ashburn	James Cox	13
Chevrolet	Day Enterprise Racing	16	John Hayden	Wayne Day 2 Mike Byrd 4	6
Chevrolet	Day Enterprise Racing	61	John Hayden	Wayne Day	1
Chevrolet	DCT Motorsports	36	Steve Grissom	Ricky Pearson	8
Chevrolet	DCT Motorsports	36	Travis Geisler	Ricky Pearson	13
Chevrolet	DCT Motorsports	36	Stanton Barrett	Ricky Pearson	3
Chevrolet	Edwards Racing	73	Tim Edwards	Don Satterfield	1
Chevrolet	FitzBradshaw Racing	82	Randy LaJoie	Eric Ralph	5
Chevrolet	FitzBradshaw Racing	82	Dave Blaney	Scott Eggelston	2
Chevrolet	Gary Keller Racing	35	Kenny Hendrick	Ted Kennedy	5
Chevrolet	Gary Keller Racing	85	Kenny Hendrick	Ted Kennedy	2
Chevrolet	Gary Keller Racing	85	Charlie Bradberry	Ted Kennedy	1
Chevrolet	GIC-Mixon Motorsports	24	Mike Harmon	John Bland	8
Chevrolet	GIC-Mixon Motorsports	24	Shane Hmiel	John Bland	4
Chevrolet	GIC-Mixon Motorsports	24	Todd Bodine	John Bland	1
Chevrolet	GIC-Mixon Motorsports	24	Aaron Fike	John Bland	1
Chevrolet	GIC-Mixon Motorsports	24	Jason Jefferson	John Bland	1
Chevrolet	GIC-Mixon Motorsports	24	Steve Grissom	John Bland	17
Chevrolet	GIC-Mixon Motorsports	93	Steve Grissom	Wayne Carroll Jr.	1
Chevrolet	Henderson Motorsports	75	Jay Sauter	James Daly	7
Chevrolet	Henderson Racing	63	Jimmy Henderson	Johnny Henderson	1
Chevrolet	Hoff Motorsports	93	Bill Hoff	Jeff Shutt	4
Chevrolet	Holigan Racing	50	David Starr	???	5
Chevrolet	Holigan Racing	50	Regan Smith	???	3
Chevrolet	Horn Auto Racing	58	Chris Horn	Fred Horn	1
Chevrolet	Horn Auto Racing	80	Chris Horn	Fred Horn	1
Chevrolet	Joe Gibbs Racing	18	J. J. Yeley (R)	Doug Hewitt 18; Jeff Chandler 1 Cliff Button 1	17
Chevrolet	Joe Gibbs Racing	18	Denny Hamlin	Doug Hewitt 18; Jeff Chandler 1 Cliff Button 1	1
Chevrolet	Joe Gibbs Racing	18	Bobby Labonte	Doug Hewitt 18; Jeff Chandler 1 Cliff Button 1	2
Chevrolet	Joe Gibbs Racing	19	Bobby Labonte	Brandon Thomas	1
Chevrolet	Keith Coleman Racing	26	Mark Green	Mike Byrd 5 Gene Allnut 1	6
Chevrolet	Keith Coleman Racing	50	Jennifer Jo Cobb	Mike Byrd	1
Chevrolet	KLM Motorsports	79	Keith Murt	???	1
Chevrolet	Lowell Bennett Motorsports	82	Lowell Bennett	Matt Groeschl	2
Chevrolet	MacDonald Motorsports	71	Kevin Lepage	Robbie Wethington 9 Steve Shore 2 Cliff Button 1	6
Chevrolet	MacDonald Motorsports	71	Randy MacDonald	Robbie Wethington 9 Steve Shore 2 Cliff Button 1	1
Chevrolet	MacDonald Motorsports	71	Roland Isaacs	Robbie Wethington 9 Steve Shore 2 Cliff Button 1	2
Chevrolet	MacDonald Motorsports	71	Stan Boyd (R)	Robbie Wethington 9 Steve Shore 2 Cliff Button 1	2
Chevrolet	MacDonald Motorsports	71	Morgan Shepherd	Robbie Wethington 9 Steve Shore 2 Cliff Button 1	1
Chevrolet	MacDonald Motorsports	71	Jason White	Robbie Wethington 9 Steve Shore 2 Cliff Button 1	1
Chevrolet	Mac Hill Motorsports	56	Regan Smith	David Ifft	8
Chevrolet	Mac Hill Motorsports	56	Tim Sauter	David Ifft	5
Chevrolet	Mac Hill Motorsports	56	Jeff Spraker	David Ifft	1
Chevrolet	Mac Hill Motorsports	56	Kevin Conway	David Ifft	1
Chevrolet	Mac Hill Motorsports	56	Eric McClure	David Ifft	2
Chevrolet	Mac Hill Motorsports	56	Bill Eversole	David Ifft	1
Chevrolet	Mohegan Sun Racing	40	Matt Kobyluck	Perry Waite	2
Chevrolet	Michael Waltrip Racing	98	Jimmy Spencer	Mike Beam	1
Chevrolet	Michael Waltrip Racing	99	Michael Waltrip	Joe Garone 20; Jerry Baxter 11	31
Chevrolet	Morgan-McClure Motorsports	04	Eric McClure	Robert Larkins	5
Chevrolet	NEMCO Motorsports	7	Todd Szegedy	David Hatfield	2
Chevrolet	NEMCO Motorsports	7	Joe Nemechek	David Hatfield	1
Chevrolet	NEMCO Motorsports	87	Joe Nemechek	Gary Putnam	16
Chevrolet	NEMCO Motorsports	87	David Reutimann	Gary Putnam	4
Chevrolet	NEMCO Motorsports	87	Todd Szegedy	Gary Putnam	2
Chevrolet	Hendrick Motorsports	87	Blake Feese	Gary Putnam	3
Chevrolet	Hendrick Motorsports	87	Boston Reid	Gary Putnam	3
Chevrolet	Hendrick Motorsports	48	Jimmie Johnson	Chad Knaus	1
Chevrolet	Norm Benning Racing	84	Norm Benning	Linda Nicholas	3
Chevrolet	Norm Benning Racing	81	Norm Benning	Linda Nicholas	2
Chevrolet	PF2 Motorsports	94	Brian Sockwell	???	1
Chevrolet	PF2 Motorsports	94	Morgan Shepherd	???	1
Chevrolet	Powell Motorsports	08	Mike Harmon	Steve Kuykendall	2
Chevrolet	Premier Motorsports	85	Randy Briggs	Keith Strunk	5
Chevrolet	Premier Motorsports	85	Brad Baker	Keith Strunk	1
Chevrolet	Race Kentucky Motorsports	65	Stuart Kirby	Bob Schacht; Mark Karnes	2
Chevrolet	Race Kentucky Motorsports	65	Stan Boyd (R)	Bob Schacht; Mark Karnes	1
Chevrolet	Reary Racing	41	Jerry Reary	Steven Barfield	1
Chevrolet	Reary Racing	41	Brian Sockwell	Steven Barfield	2
Chevrolet	Reary Racing	40	Brian Sockwell	Steven Barfield	1
Chevrolet	Red Cactus Racing	73	Eric Jones	Steve Chick Jr. 1 Buddy Sisco 1 Ricky Pearson 1	3
Chevrolet	Richard Childress Racing	29	Bobby Labonte	Gil Martin	1
Chevrolet	Richard Childress Racing	29	Tony Stewart	Gil Martin	2
Chevrolet	Richard Childress Racing	29	Ricky Craven	Gil Martin	1
Chevrolet	Richard Childress Racing	29	Kerry Earnhardt	Gil Martin	1
Chevrolet	Richard Childress Racing	29	Brandon Miller	Gil Martin	1
Chevrolet	Richard Childress Racing	29	Kevin Harvick	Gil Martin	2
Chevrolet	Rick Markle Racing	68	Rick Markle	Kevin Payne	4
Chevrolet	Robby Gordon Motorsports	55	Robby Gordon	Bob Temple	25
Chevrolet	R/T Racing	68	Travis Kittleson	Patrick Donahue	1
Chevrolet	Shane Wallace Motorsports	63	Shane Wallace	Darren Shaw	4
Chevrolet	S.W.A.T. Racing	62	Larry Hollenbeck	Cal Humphries	5
Chevrolet	TC Motorsports	34	Steven Christian	Tom Broome	1
Chevrolet	TC Motorsports	34	Mark Gibson	Tom Broome	1
Chevrolet	Woodland Racing	40	Brian Tyler	Cal Humphries	1
Dodge	Akins Motorsports	58	Brent Sherman	Joey Fellores	3
Dodge	Braun Racing	30	Jamie McMurray	???	1
Dodge	Chip Ganassi Racing	41	Reed Sorenson	Brian Pattie	4
Dodge	Chip Ganassi Racing	41	Jamie McMurray	Brian Pattie	2
Dodge	Chip Ganassi Racing	41	Casey Mears	Brian Pattie	2
Dodge	Country Joe Racing	98	Joey Miller	Patrick Donahue	1
Dodge	Hirschfeld Motorsports	78	Chad Blount	???	1
Dodge	Labonte Motorsports	44	Justin Labonte	Bryant Frazier	17
Dodge	Rusty Wallace, Inc.	66	Billy Parker (R)	Blake Bainbridge	8
Dodge	Rusty Wallace, Inc.	66	Jamie McMurray	Blake Bainbridge	7
Dodge	Rusty Wallace, Inc.	66	Rusty Wallace	Blake Bainbridge	2
Dodge	Tommy Baldwin Racing	6	Paul Wolfe	Ron Otto	4
Dodge	Tommy Baldwin Racing	6	Tracy Hines	Ron Otto	3
Dodge	Tommy Baldwin Racing	6	Jeremy Mayfield	Ron Otto	1
Dodge	Tommy Baldwin Racing	6	Scott Lynch	Ron Otto	2
Dodge	Tommy Baldwin Racing	6	Mark McFarland	Ron Otto	3
Dodge	Tommy Baldwin Racing	6	Bill Elliott	Ron Otto	1
Dodge	Tommy Baldwin Racing	6	Randy LaJoie	Ron Otto	1
Dodge	Ultra Motorsports	86	Ted Musgrave	Gene Nead	1
Ford	Borneman Motorsports	83	Johnny Borneman III	John Borneman	1
Ford	Glidden Motorsports	84	Dion Ciccarelli	Greg Deese	7
Ford	Jay Robinson Racing	28	Mark Green	Kenneth Campbell 8 Jay Robinson 6	7
Ford	Jay Robinson Racing	28	Jimmy Kitchens	Kenneth Campbell 8 Jay Robinson 6	1
Ford	Jay Robinson Racing	28	Josh Richeson	Kenneth Campbell 8 Jay Robinson 6	1
Ford	Jay Robinson Racing	28	Shane Hall	Kenneth Campbell 8 Jay Robinson 6	4
Ford	Jay Robinson Racing	28	Blake Mallory	Kenneth Campbell 8 Jay Robinson 6	2
Ford	Long Brothers Racing	83	Carl Long	Doug Davis	2
Ford	Long Brothers Racing	83	Jamey Caudill	Doug Davis	1
Ford	Marsh Racing	31	Dave Blaney	Ted Marsh	3
Ford	Marsh Racing	31	Todd Bodine	Ted Marsh	7
Ford	Marsh Racing	31	Randy LaJoie	Ted Marsh	1
Ford	Means Racing	52	Bruce Bechtel	J. J. Porter	4
Ford	Means Racing	52	Brad Teague	J. J. Porter	14
Ford	Means Racing	52	Jason Rudd	J. J. Porter	1
Ford	Moy Racing	77	Donnie Neuenberger (R)	Jarvis Totherow	7
Ford	Moy Racing	77	Chad Chaffin	Jarvis Totherow	1
Ford	Moy Racing	77	Brad Teague	Jarvis Totherow	5
Ford	Moy Racing	77	Shane Hall	Jarvis Totherow	1
Ford	Moy Racing	77	Jimmy Kitchens	Jarvis Totherow	17
Ford	Moy Racing	77	Bruce Bechtel	Jarvis Totherow	1
Ford	Moy Racing	07	Carl Long	???	2
Ford	Moy Racing	07	Ryck Sanders	???	1
Ford	Moy Racing	07	Jimmy Kitchens	???	1
Ford	RAB Racing	03	Robby Benton	Jeff Buice	2
Ford	RAB Racing	03	Carl Edwards	Jeff Buice	1
Ford	Roush Racing	9	Mark Martin	Tony Liberati	6
Ford	Roush Racing	9	Jeff Burton	Tony Liberati	4
Ford	Roush Racing	9	Matt Kenseth	Tony Liberati	3
Ford	Reiser Enterprises	17	Matt Kenseth	Cully Barraclough	13
Ford	Reiser Enterprises	17	Johnny Benson	Cully Barraclough	1
Ford	Team Rensi Motorsports	35	Johnny Borneman III	Charles Wright	2
Ford	Team Rensi Motorsports	35	Shelby Howard	Charles Wright	6
Ford	Team Rensi Motorsports	35	Wally Dallenbach Jr.	Charles Wright	5
Ford	Tri-City Motorsports	40	Todd Shafer	Joe Dan Bailey	1
Ford	Vahsholtz Racing	90	Clint Vahsholtz	Chris Diederich	5
Pontiac	Oostlander Racing	54	Mike Harmon	Eddie Sharp	3
Pontiac	White Knight Motorsports	28	Kim Crosby	George White	1
Chevrolet Dodge	Curb Agajanian Motorsports	43	Josh Richeson	Joe Shear Jr.	1
Chevrolet Dodge	Curb Agajanian Motorsports	43	Aaron Fike	Joe Shear Jr.	12
Chevrolet Dodge	Ware Racing Enterprises	57	Stan Boyd (R)	David Duke	5
Chevrolet Dodge	Ware Racing Enterprises	57	Morgan Shepherd	David Duke	2
Chevrolet Dodge	Ware Racing Enterprises	57	Bruce Bechtel	David Duke	1
Ford Chevrolet	Sadler Brothers Racing	95	David Keith	Ronnie Smith	4
Ford Chevrolet	Sadler Brothers Racing	95	David Ragan	Ronnie Smith	2
Ford Dodge	Beahr Racing Enterprises	90	Chad Beahr	Johnny Blake	2
Ford Dodge	Beahr Racing Enterprises	94	Eddie Beahr	???	7
Ford Dodge	Beahr Racing Enterprises	9	Eddie Beahr	???	1
Ford Dodge	Shepherd Racing	89	Morgan Shepherd	???	2
Pontiac Chevrolet	Ortec Racing	96	Gus Wasson	Julian Burgess	6
Pontiac Chevrolet	Ortec Racing	96	Caleb Holman	Julian Burgess	2
Pontiac Chevrolet	Ortec Racing	96	Shane Hall	Julian Burgess	6
Pontiac Chevrolet	Ortec Racing	96	Kim Crosby	Julian Burgess	1
Pontiac Chevrolet	SCORE Motorsports	02	Hermie Sadler	Ernie Cope	30
Pontiac Chevrolet	SCORE Motorsports	02	Garrett Liberty	Ernie Cope	1
Pontiac Chevrolet	Smith Brothers Motorsports	67	C. W. Smith	Steve Yeagle	4
Pontiac Chevrolet	Smith Brothers Motorsports	67	Kevin Conway	Steve Yeagle	1
Pontiac Chevrolet	Stanton Barrett Motorsports	91	Shawna Robinson	Fred Wanke	1
Pontiac Chevrolet	Stanton Barrett Motorsports	91	Kenny Wallace (Note: Stanton Barrett qualified the No. 91 car at Rockingham (race #2), but was replaced in the race by Kenny Wallace after he failed to qualify in his own No. 23 car.)	Fred Wanke	1
Pontiac Chevrolet	Stanton Barrett Motorsports	91	Stanton Barrett	Fred Wanke	18
Pontiac Chevrolet	Stanton Barrett Motorsports	97	Stanton Barrett	Terry Allen; Carl Britt	1
Pontiac Chevrolet	Stanton Barrett Motorsports	97	Jimmy Kitchens	Terry Allen; Carl Britt	1
Pontiac Chevrolet	Stanton Barrett Motorsports	97	Jason Schuler	Terry Allen; Carl Britt	1
Pontiac Chevrolet	Stanton Barrett Motorsports	97	Josh Richeson	Terry Allen; Carl Britt	1
Pontiac Chevrolet	Stanton Barrett Motorsports	97	Ron Barfield Jr.	Terry Allen; Carl Britt	1
Pontiac Chevrolet	Tennessee Mountain Boys Racing	53	Brad Teague	Zandel Bowers	3
Pontiac Chevrolet	Tennessee Mountain Boys Racing	53	Butch Jarvis	Zandel Bowers	5
Pontiac Chevrolet	Tennessee Mountain Boys Racing	53	Joe Buford	Zandel Bowers	3
Dodge Chevrolet Ford	Ware Racing Enterprises	51	Kevin Conway	Dan Kolanda	1
Dodge Chevrolet Ford	Ware Racing Enterprises	51	Shane Sieg	Dan Kolanda	3
Dodge Chevrolet Ford	Ware Racing Enterprises	51	Stan Boyd (R)	Dan Kolanda	8
Dodge Chevrolet Ford	Ware Racing Enterprises	51	Kim Crosby	Dan Kolanda	4
Dodge Chevrolet Ford	Ware Racing Enterprises	51	Morgan Shepherd	Dan Kolanda	2
Dodge Chevrolet Ford	Ware Racing Enterprises	51	Travis Powell	Dan Kolanda	1
Dodge Chevrolet Ford	Ware Racing Enterprises	51	Dana White (Note: Dana White qualified the car at Lowe's (race #13), but was replaced in the race by J. J. Yeley after he failed to qualify in his own No. 18 car.)	Dan Kolanda	3
Dodge Chevrolet Ford	Ware Racing Enterprises	51	J. J. Yeley	Dan Kolanda	1
Dodge Chevrolet Ford	Ware Racing Enterprises	51	David Eshleman	Dan Kolanda	1
Dodge Chevrolet Ford	Ware Racing Enterprises	51	Bobby Dotter	Dan Kolanda	1
Dodge Chevrolet Ford	Ware Racing Enterprises	51	Blake Mallory	Dan Kolanda	2
Dodge Chevrolet Ford	Ware Racing Enterprises	51	Stanton Barrett	Dan Kolanda	1
Dodge Chevrolet Ford	Ware Racing Enterprises	51	Wayne Edwards	Dan Kolanda	1
Dodge Chevrolet Ford	Ware Racing Enterprises	51	Kenny Hendrick	Dan Kolanda	5

== Schedule ==
No	Race title	Track	Date
1	Hershey's Kisses 300	Daytona International Speedway, Daytona Beach, Florida	February 14
2	Goody's Headache Powder 200	North Carolina Speedway, Rockingham, North Carolina	February 21
3	Sam's Town 300	Las Vegas Motor Speedway, Las Vegas, Nevada	March 6
4	Diamond Hill Plywood 200	Darlington Raceway, Darlington, South Carolina	March 20
5	Sharpie Professional 250	Bristol Motor Speedway, Bristol, Tennessee	March 27
6	O'Reilly 300	Texas Motor Speedway, Fort Worth, Texas	April 3
7	Pepsi 300	Nashville Superspeedway, Gladeville, Tennessee	April 10
8	Aaron's 312	Talladega Superspeedway, Talladega, Alabama	April 24
9	Stater Brothers 300 presented by Gatorade	California Speedway, Fontana, California	May 1
10	Charter 250	Gateway International Raceway, Madison, Illinois	May 8
11	Funai 250	Richmond International Raceway, Richmond, Virginia	May 14
12	Goulds Pumps/ITT Industries 200	Nazareth Speedway, Nazareth, Pennsylvania	May 23
13	Carquest Auto Parts 300	Lowe's Motor Speedway, Concord, North Carolina	May 29
14	MBNA America 200	Dover International Speedway, Dover, Delaware	June 5
15	Federated Auto Parts 300	Nashville Superspeedway, Gladeville, Tennessee	June 12
16	Meijer 300 presented by Oreo	Kentucky Speedway, Sparta, Kentucky	June 19
17	Alan Kulwicki 250	Milwaukee Mile, West Allis, Wisconsin	June 26
18	Winn-Dixie 250 presented by PepsiCo	Daytona International Speedway, Daytona Beach, Florida	July 2
19	Tropicana Twister 300	Chicagoland Speedway, Joliet, Illinois	July 10
20	Siemens 200	New Hampshire Motor Speedway, Loudon, New Hampshire	July 24
21	ITT Industries & Goulds Pumps Salute to the Troops 250	Pikes Peak International Raceway, Fountain, Colorado	July 31
22	Kroger 200	Indianapolis Raceway Park, Brownsburg, Indiana	August 7
23	Cabela's 250	Michigan International Speedway, Brooklyn, Michigan	August 21
24	Food City 250	Bristol Motor Speedway, Bristol, Tennessee	August 27
25	Target House 300	California Speedway, Fontana, California	September 4
26	Emerson Radio 250	Richmond International Raceway, Richmond, Virginia	September 10
27	Stacker 200 presented by YJ Stinger	Dover International Speedway, Dover, Delaware	September 25
28	Mr. Goodcents 300	Kansas Speedway, Kansas City, Kansas	October 9
29	Lowe's presents the SpongeBob SquarePants Movie 300	Lowe's Motor Speedway, Concord, North Carolina	October 15
30	Sam's Town 250 benefitting St. Jude	Memphis Motorsports Park, Millington, Tennessee	October 23
31	Aaron's 312	Atlanta Motor Speedway, Hampton, Georgia	October 30
32	Bashas' Supermarkets 200	Phoenix International Raceway, Avondale, Arizona	November 6
33	BI-LO 200	Darlington Raceway, Darlington, South Carolina	November 13
34	Ford 300	Homestead-Miami Speedway, Homestead, Florida	November 20

== Races ==
=== Hershey's Kisses 300 ===
The Hershey's Kisses 300 started on February 14 but was postponed to February 16 due to rain. The race was held at Daytona International Speedway. Martin Truex Jr. won the pole. This was the first of NASCAR's top national touring series races to be broadcast in high definition.

Top ten results

1. #8 - Dale Earnhardt Jr.*
2. #27 - Johnny Sauter
3. #55 - Robby Gordon
4. #21 - Kevin Harvick
5. #17 - Matt Kenseth
6. #32 - David Stremme
7. #2 - Ron Hornaday Jr.
8. #00 - Jason Leffler
9. #22 - Jason Keller
10. #37 - David Green

Failed to qualify: Mike Harmon (#24), David Keith (#95), Stanton Barrett (#91), Kevin Conway (#51), Stan Boyd (#57), Regan Smith (#56), Kim Crosby (#28), Robby Benton (#39), Mark Martin (#9), Brian Conz (#05), Norm Benning (#84)-Withdrew

- Norm Benning withdrew after practice.
- This was Dale Earnhardt Jr.'s fifth consecutive Busch Series victory, his third consecutive victory in the season opening event, and his fourth consecutive Busch Series superspeedway victory.

=== Goody's Headache Powder 200 ===
The Goody's Headache Powder 200 was held on February 21 at North Carolina Speedway. Johnny Benson won the pole.

Top ten results

1. #30 - Jamie McMurray*
2. #8 - Martin Truex Jr.
3. #21 - Kevin Harvick
4. #99 - Michael Waltrip
5. #37 - David Green
6. #27 - Johnny Sauter
7. #5 - Kyle Busch
8. #25 - Bobby Hamilton Jr.
9. #1 - Johnny Benson
10. #2 - Ron Hornaday Jr.

Failed to qualify: Kenny Wallace (#23)*, Shane Sieg (#51), Eddie Beahr (#94), Paul Wolfe (#6), Jerry Reary (#41)-Withdrew

- Kenny Wallace replaced Stanton Barrett in the #91 car for the race, after failing to qualify his #23.
- Jerry Reary was forced to withdraw after wrecking his car in practice and did not have a backup car.
- This was McMurray's 4th consecutive Busch series victory at North Carolina Speedway.
- This was the last Busch Series race at Rockingham until 2025.

=== Sam's Town 300 ===
The Sam's Town 300 was held on March 6 at Las Vegas Motor Speedway. Mike Bliss won the pole.

Top ten results

1. #21 - Kevin Harvick
2. #38 - Kasey Kahne
3. #32 - David Stremme
4. #99 - Michael Waltrip
5. #25 - Bobby Hamilton Jr.
6. #9 - Matt Kenseth
7. #12 - Tim Fedewa
8. #22 - Jason Keller
9. #87 - Joe Nemechek
10. #60 - Greg Biffle

Failed to qualify: Andy Ponstein (#39), David Starr (#50), Larry Gunselman (#72), Damon Lusk (#74), Bruce Bechtel (#52), Randy Briggs (#85), Stan Boyd (#57)

- Johnny Sauter, who finished in 16th suffered a 25-point penalty after the race for cursing in his on-air interview.

=== Diamond Hill Plywood 200 ===
The Diamond Hill Plywood 200 was held on March 20 at Darlington Raceway. Kyle Busch won the pole.

Top ten results

1. #60 - Greg Biffle
2. #9 - Jeff Burton
3. #37 - David Green
4. #8 - Martin Truex Jr.
5. #32 - David Stremme
6. #1 - Johnny Benson
7. #55 - Robby Gordon
8. #99 - Michael Waltrip
9. #14 - Casey Atwood
10. #20 - Mike Bliss

Failed to qualify: Eddie Beahr (#94), Norm Benning (#84)

=== Sharpie Professional 250 ===
The Sharpie Professional 250 was held on March 27 at Bristol Motor Speedway. Greg Biffle won the pole.

Top ten results

1. #8 - Martin Truex Jr.*
2. #21 - Kevin Harvick
3. #5 - Kyle Busch
4. #60 - Greg Biffle
5. #37 - David Green
6. #74 - Tony Raines
7. #99 - Michael Waltrip
8. #22 - Jason Keller
9. #2 - Ron Hornaday Jr.
10. #4 - Mike Wallace

Failed to qualify: Justin Ashburn (#16), Butch Jarvis (#53), Mike Potter (#0)

- This was Martin Truex Jr.'s first career Busch Series victory.

=== O'Reilly 300 ===
The O'Reilly 300 was held on April 3 at Texas Motor Speedway. Kyle Busch won the pole.

Top ten results

1. #17 - Matt Kenseth
2. #5 - Kyle Busch
3. #55 - Robby Gordon
4. #1 - Johnny Benson
5. #25 - Bobby Hamilton Jr.
6. #00 - Jason Leffler
7. #87 - Joe Nemechek
8. #37 - David Green
9. #9 - Jeff Burton
10. #8 - Martin Truex Jr.

Failed to qualify: Stan Boyd (#51), Brad Teague (#39), Blake Mallory (#0), Donnie Neuenberger (#77), Justin Ashburn (#16), Bruce Bechtel (#52)

=== Pepsi 300 ===
The Pepsi 300 was held on April 10 at Nashville Superspeedway. Martin Truex Jr. won the pole.

Top ten results

1. #99 - Michael Waltrip*
2. #27 - Johnny Sauter
3. #38 - Kasey Kahne
4. #21 - Clint Bowyer
5. #55 - Robby Gordon
6. #5 - Kyle Busch
7. #1 - Johnny Benson
8. #20 - Mike Bliss
9. #22 - Jason Leffler
10. #37 - David Green

Failed to qualify: Shane Wallace (#63), Stan Boyd (#51), Justin Ashburn (#16), Chad Chaffin (#77), Mike Harmon (#24), Greg Sacks (#0), Morgan Shepherd (#89), Jimmy Kitchens (#97), Eddie Beahr (#94), Norm Benning (#84), Brad Baker (#85)

- Robby Gordon, Johnny Benson, Clint Bowyer, and Kyle Busch tangled on the backstretch while battling for the lead, giving the victory to Waltrip, who took the lead from Johnny Sauter while avoiding the accident before the caution came out.
- This was Waltrip's last career Busch Series victory.

=== Aaron's 312 (Talladega) ===
The Aaron's 312 was held on April 24 at Talladega Superspeedway. Clint Bowyer won the pole.

Top ten results

1. #8 - Martin Truex Jr.
2. #81 - Dale Earnhardt Jr.
3. #2 - Ron Hornaday Jr.
4. #5 - Kyle Busch
5. #00 - Jason Leffler
6. #23 - Kenny Wallace
7. #55 - Robby Gordon
8. #99 - Michael Waltrip
9. #37 - David Green
10. #87 - Joe Nemechek

Failed to qualify: Gus Wasson (#0), Robby Benton (#03)

=== Stater Brothers 300 presented by Gatorade ===
The Stater Brothers 300 presented by Gatorade was held on May 1 at California Speedway. Jason Leffler won the pole.

Top ten results

1. #60 - Greg Biffle
2. #29 - Tony Stewart
3. #59 - Stacy Compton
4. #17 - Matt Kenseth
5. #38 - Kasey Kahne
6. #99 - Michael Waltrip
7. #5 - Kyle Busch
8. #21 - Kevin Harvick
9. #23 - Kenny Wallace
10. #25 - Bobby Hamilton Jr.

Failed to qualify: Johnny Borneman III (#35), David Starr (#50), Bruce Bechtel (#57), Stanton Barrett (#91)

=== Charter 250 ===
The Charter 250 was held on May 8 at Gateway International Raceway. Martin Truex Jr. won the pole.

Top ten results

1. #8 - Martin Truex Jr.
2. #2 - Ron Hornaday Jr.
3. #22 - Jason Keller
4. #25 - Bobby Hamilton Jr.
5. #5 - Kyle Busch
6. #00 - Jason Leffler
7. #60 - Greg Biffle
8. #32 - David Stremme
9. #12 - Tim Fedewa
10. #55 - Robby Gordon

Failed to qualify: Clint Vahsholtz (#90), Brad Teague (#53), Shane Wallace (#63), Dion Ciccarelli (#84), Randy Briggs (#85)

- Derrike Cope was injured after a crash in practice and was replaced by Josh Richeson in the #49 in the race.

=== Funai 250 ===
The Funai 250 was held on May 14 at Richmond International Raceway. Kyle Busch won the pole.

Top ten results

1. #5 - Kyle Busch*
2. #60 - Greg Biffle
3. #21 - Kevin Harvick
4. #25 - Bobby Hamilton Jr.
5. #22 - Jason Keller
6. #37 - David Green
7. #8 - Martin Truex Jr.
8. #20 - Mike Bliss
9. #23 - Kenny Wallace
10. #38 - Kasey Kahne

Failed to qualify: Brad Teague (#77), Eddie Beahr (#94), Chad Beahr (#90), Butch Jarvis (#53)

- This was Kyle Busch's first career NASCAR national series victory. As of 2025, Busch has won at least one race in any of NASCAR's top-three national series each year since.

=== Goulds Pumps/ITT Industries 200 ===
The Goulds Pumps/ITT Industries 200 was held on May 23 at Nazareth Speedway. Kyle Busch won the pole.

Top ten results

1. #8 - Martin Truex Jr.
2. #25 - Bobby Hamilton Jr.
3. #37 - David Green
4. #22 - Jason Keller
5. #32 - David Stremme
6. #14 - Casey Atwood
7. #00 - Jason Leffler
8. #99 - Michael Waltrip
9. #23 - Kenny Wallace
10. #5 - Kyle Busch

Failed to qualify: none

- This was the last NASCAR race to be held at Nazareth.
- Jeff Purvis made his final career NASCAR start in this event, racing for the first time since his career-ending crash in this same race two years earlier. Purvis started 26th and finished 17th.
- Jason Rudd, who finished 42nd, suffered a 25-point penalty for unknown reasons.

=== Carquest Auto Parts 300 ===
The Carquest Auto Parts 300 was held on May 29 at Lowe's Motor Speedway. Greg Biffle won the pole.

Top ten results

1. #5 - Kyle Busch
2. #1 - Jamie McMurray
3. #21 - Kevin Harvick
4. #00 - Jason Leffler
5. #29 - Tony Stewart
6. #60 - Greg Biffle
7. #2 - Ron Hornaday Jr.
8. #32 - David Stremme
9. #23 - Kenny Wallace
10. #46 - Ashton Lewis

Failed to qualify: Regan Smith (#56), Morgan Shepherd (#94), J. J. Yeley (#18)*

- J. J. Yeley replaced Dana White in the #51 in the race after failing to qualify his #18.

=== MBNA America 200 ===
The MBNA America 200 was held on June 5–7 at Dover International Speedway. David Green won the pole.

Top ten results

1. #60 - Greg Biffle
2. #8 - Martin Truex Jr.
3. #37 - David Green
4. #25 - Bobby Hamilton Jr.
5. #5 - Kyle Busch
6. #21 - Kevin Harvick
7. #38 - Kasey Kahne
8. #1 - Jamie McMurray
9. #12 - Tim Fedewa
10. #27 - Johnny Sauter

Failed to qualify: Dion Ciccarelli (#84)

- Ron Hornaday Jr., who finished 29th, suffered a 25-point penalty for cursing in a radio interview during the race.

=== Federated Auto Parts 300 ===
The Federated Auto Parts 300 was held on June 12 at Nashville Superspeedway. Martin Truex Jr. won the pole.

Top ten results

1. #00 - Jason Leffler*
2. #8 - Martin Truex Jr.*
3. #21 - Clint Bowyer
4. #20 - Mike Bliss
5. #2 - Ron Hornaday Jr.
6. #38 - Kasey Kahne
7. #14 - Casey Atwood
8. #18 - J. J. Yeley
9. #46 - Ashton Lewis
10. #59 - Stacy Compton

Failed to qualify: Justin Ashburn (#16), Joe Buford (#53), Steven Christian (#34), Eddie Beahr (#94), David Keith (#0)

- This was Jason Leffler's first career Busch Series victory.
- After finishing 2nd, and with Kyle Busch finishing 17th, Martin Truex Jr. took the championship points lead, and would hold it for the rest of the season.

=== Meijer 300 presented by Oreo ===
The Meijer 300 presented by Oreo was held on June 19 at Kentucky Speedway. Martin Truex Jr. won the pole.

Top ten results

1. #5 - Kyle Busch
2. #60 - Greg Biffle
3. #20 - Mike Bliss
4. #2 - Ron Hornaday Jr.
5. #22 - Jason Keller
6. #8 - Martin Truex Jr.
7. #00 - Jason Leffler
8. #46 - Ashton Lewis
9. #32 - David Stremme
10. #21 - Clint Bowyer

Failed to qualify: Brad Teague (#52), Shawna Robinson (#91), Stuart Kirby (#65), Justin Ashburn (#16), Chris Horn (#58)

=== Alan Kulwicki 250 ===
The Alan Kulwicki 250 was held on June 26 at The Milwaukee Mile. David Stremme won the pole.

Top ten results

1. #2 - Ron Hornaday Jr.
2. #32 - David Stremme
3. #22 - Jason Keller
4. #38 - Shane Hmiel
5. #25 - Bobby Hamilton Jr.
6. #20 - Mike Bliss
7. #60 - Greg Biffle
8. #37 - David Green
9. #8 - Martin Truex Jr.
10. #21 - Clint Bowyer

Failed to qualify: none

=== Winn-Dixie 250 presented by PepsiCo ===
The Winn-Dixie 250 presented by PepsiCo was held on July 2 at Daytona International Speedway. Mike Bliss won the pole.

Top ten results

1. #4 - Mike Wallace*
2. #60 - Greg Biffle
3. #8 - Martin Truex Jr.
4. #47 - Robert Pressley
5. #20 - Mike Bliss
6. #38 - Kasey Kahne
7. #1 - Casey Mears
8. #21 - Kevin Harvick
9. #2 - Ron Hornaday Jr.
10. #12 - Tim Fedewa

Failed to qualify: Mike Harmon (#24), Brad Teague (#0)

- This was Mike Wallace's first victory since IRP in 1994. It was an emotional victory for Wallace, who was publicly thanked by Tony Stewart in victory lane for giving Tony, "some of the best advice I've ever got in my life."
- Jason Leffler originally finished 2nd, but was penalized for spinning Michael Waltrip out of the lead on the last lap, and putting Dale Earnhardt Jr. in the wall shortly after. Leffler was relegated to 13th.

=== Tropicana Twister 300 ===
The Twister 300 was held on July 10 at Chicagoland Speedway. Bobby Hamilton Jr. won the pole.

Top ten results

1. #44 - Justin Labonte*
2. #22 - Jason Keller
3. #9 - Jeff Burton
4. #38 - Kasey Kahne
5. #46 - Ashton Lewis
6. #55 - Robby Gordon
7. #00 - Jason Leffler
8. #37 - David Green
9. #18 - J. J. Yeley
10. #2 - Ron Hornaday Jr.

Failed to qualify: Jeff Fuller (#88), Blake Mallory (#51), Stanton Barrett (#91), Jimmy Kitchens (#77), Carl Long (#07), Larry Hollenbeck (#62), Kevin Conway (#56)

- This was Justin Labonte's first and only NASCAR victory.
- During qualifying, the trademark Tropicana orange was blown off its stand by severe wind, and driver Todd Szegedy narrowly avoided the wayward fruit. He was later granted an opportunity to re-qualify. This accident caused the sponsor of the Nextel and Busch races to change from Tropicana to various sponsors in 2005.

=== Siemens 200 ===
The Siemens 200 was held on July 24 at New Hampshire International Speedway. Jamie McMurray won the pole.

Top ten results

1. #17 - Matt Kenseth
2. #12 - Tim Fedewa
3. #00 - Jason Leffler
4. #38 - Kasey Kahne
5. #21 - Kevin Harvick
6. #2 - Ron Hornaday Jr.
7. #23 - Kenny Wallace
8. #59 - Stacy Compton
9. #25 - Bobby Hamilton Jr.
10. #4 - Mike Wallace

Failed to qualify: David Keith (#0), Dion Ciccarelli (#84), Randy MacDonald (#71), Bill Hoff (#93), Stuart Kirby (#65)

=== ITT Industries & Goulds Pumps Salute to the Troops 250 ===
The ITT Industries & Goulds Pumps Salute to the Troops 250 was held on July 31 at Pikes Peak International Raceway. Martin Truex Jr. won the pole.

Top ten results

1. #60 - Greg Biffle
2. #59 - Stacy Compton
3. #00 - Jason Leffler
4. #2 - Clint Bowyer
5. #8 - Martin Truex Jr.
6. #20 - Mike Bliss
7. #32 - David Stremme
8. #37 - David Green
9. #14 - Casey Atwood
10. #25 - Bobby Hamilton Jr.

Failed to qualify: Mike Harmon (#08), Ron Barfield Jr. (#97), Ryck Sanders (#07), Tim Edwards (#73)

=== Kroger 200 presented by Tom Raper RVs ===
The Kroger 200 presented by Tom Raper RVs was held on August 7 at Indianapolis Raceway Park. Johnny Sauter won the pole.

Top ten results

1. #5 - Kyle Busch
2. #27 - Johnny Sauter
3. #00 - Jason Leffler
4. #8 - Martin Truex Jr.
5. #60 - Greg Biffle
6. #25 - Bobby Hamilton Jr.
7. #20 - Mike Bliss
8. #14 - Casey Atwood
9. #23 - Kenny Wallace
10. #37 - David Green

Failed to qualify: John Hayden (#16), Brad Teague (#52), Kenny Hendrick (#85), Roland Isaacs (#71), Jimmy Kitchens (#77), Butch Jarvis (#53), Dana White (#51)

=== Cabela's 250 ===
The Cabela's 250 was held on August 21 at Michigan International Speedway. Martin Truex Jr. won the pole.

Top ten results

1. #5 - Kyle Busch
2. #9 - Mark Martin
3. #8 - Martin Truex Jr.
4. #1 - Casey Mears
5. #38 - Kasey Kahne
6. #66 - Rusty Wallace
7. #00 - Jason Leffler
8. #60 - Greg Biffle
9. #4 - Mike Wallace
10. #20 - Mike Bliss

Failed to qualify: Kevin Lepage (#71), Tony Stewart (#81), Paul Menard (#11), C. W. Smith (#67), Shelby Howard (#35), Todd Szegedy (#7), Bobby Labonte (#19)

=== Food City 250 ===
The Food City 250 was held on August 27 at Bristol Motor Speedway. Dale Earnhardt Jr. won the pole.

Top ten results

1. #81 - Dale Earnhardt Jr.
2. #17 - Matt Kenseth
3. #5 - Kyle Busch
4. #21 - Kevin Harvick
5. #37 - David Green
6. #32 - David Stremme
7. #8 - Martin Truex Jr.
8. #22 - Jason Keller
9. #47 - Robert Pressley
10. #14 - Casey Atwood

Failed to qualify: Brad Teague (#52), Joe Buford (#53), Mike Potter (#0), Cam Strader (#06), Morgan Shepherd (#51), Rick Markle (#68), Caleb Holman (#96), John Hayden (#16)

=== Target House 300 ===
The Target House 300 was held on September 4 at California Speedway. Casey Mears won the pole.

Top ten results

1. #60 - Greg Biffle
2. #1 - Casey Mears
3. #21 - Kevin Harvick
4. #38 - Kasey Kahne
5. #66 - Jamie McMurray
6. #8 - Martin Truex Jr.
7. #18 - Bobby Labonte
8. #87 - Joe Nemechek
9. #5 - Kyle Busch
10. #00 - Jason Leffler

Failed to qualify: Morgan Shepherd (#57)

=== Emerson Radio 250 ===
The Emerson Radio 250 was held on September 10 at Richmond International Raceway. Kasey Kahne won the pole.

Top ten results

1. #55 - Robby Gordon*
2. #14 - Casey Atwood
3. #8 - Martin Truex Jr.
4. #00 - Jason Leffler
5. #5 - Kyle Busch
6. #20 - Mike Bliss
7. #21 - Kevin Harvick
8. #32 - David Stremme
9. #38 - Kasey Kahne
10. #27 - Johnny Sauter

Failed to qualify: Mike Potter (#0), Todd Bodine (#31), Justin Labonte (#44), Eric McClure (#04), Jay Sauter (#75), Kevin Lepage (#71), Tim Sauter (#56), Eddie Beahr (#94), Wayne Edwards (#51), Jimmy Kitchens (#77), Tina Gordon (#39)

- This was Robby Gordon's first and only career Busch Series victory, and the only NASCAR victory for his own team.

=== Stacker 200 presented by YJ Stinger ===
The Stacker 200 Presented by YJ Stinger was on held September 25 at Dover International Speedway. Kasey Kahne won the pole.

Top ten results

1. #8 - Martin Truex Jr.
2. #25 - Mike McLaughlin
3. #38 - Kasey Kahne
4. #00 - Jason Leffler
5. #27 - Johnny Sauter
6. #21 - Kevin Harvick
7. #2 - Ron Hornaday Jr.
8. #9 - Mark Martin
9. #5 - Kyle Busch
10. #37 - David Green

Failed to qualify: Morgan Shepherd (#71), Dion Ciccarelli (#84), Matt Kobyluck (#40), Bill Hoff (#93), Stan Boyd (#65)

=== Mr. Goodcents 300 ===
The Mr. Goodcents 300 was held on October 9 at Kansas Speedway. Paul Menard won the pole.

Top ten results

1. #87 - Joe Nemechek*
2. #60 - Greg Biffle
3. #32 - David Stremme
4. #46 - Ashton Lewis
5. #2 - Ron Hornaday Jr.
6. #18 - J. J. Yeley
7. #22 - Jason Keller
8. #1 - Casey Mears
9. #59 - Stacy Compton
10. #35 - Wally Dallenbach Jr.

Failed to qualify: John Hayden (#16), Brad Teague (#52), Stan Boyd (#71), Shane Hall (#28), Morgan Shepherd (#0), Chris Horn (#80), Kenny Hendrick (#51), Jimmy Kitchens (#77), Bill Eversole (#56), Randy Briggs (#85), Clint Vahsholtz (#90)

- This was Joe Nemechek's final career Busch Series victory. The next day, Nemechek would go on to score his final Cup Series victory.
- Points leader Martin Truex Jr. crashed with Ron Hornaday Jr. on lap 4, while 2nd-place Kyle Busch got collected in a multi-car pileup on lap 82. Busch and Truex finished 29th and 30th, respectively.

=== Lowe's presents the SpongeBob SquarePants Movie 300 ===
The Lowe's presents the SpongeBob SquarePants Movie 300 was held on October 15 at Lowe's Motor Speedway. Casey Mears won the pole.

Top ten results

1. #20 - Mike Bliss*
2. #17 - Matt Kenseth
3. #48 - Jimmie Johnson
4. #60 - Greg Biffle
5. #5 - Kyle Busch
6. #8 - Martin Truex Jr.
7. #1 - Casey Mears
8. #66 - Jamie McMurray
9. #23 - Kenny Wallace
10. #21 - Clint Bowyer

Failed to qualify: Paul Menard (#11), Robby Benton (#03), Eric McClure (#04), Kertus Davis (#0), Kenny Hendrick (#51), Brad Teague (#52), Brian Sockwell (#40), Gus Wasson (#10), Jimmy Kitchens (#77), Scott Lynch (#6), Jimmy Henderson (#63), Tina Gordon (#39), Travis Geisler (#36), Larry Hollenbeck (#62)

- This was Mike Bliss' first NASCAR Busch Series victory.

=== Sam's Town 250 benefitting St. Jude ===
The Sam's Town 250 benefitting St. Jude was held on October 23 at Memphis Motorsports Park. Martin Truex Jr. won the pole.

Top ten results

1. #8 - Martin Truex Jr.
2. #60 - Greg Biffle
3. #2 - Ron Hornaday Jr.
4. #21 - Clint Bowyer
5. #20 - Mike Bliss
6. #22 - Jason Keller
7. #32 - David Stremme
8. #27 - Johnny Sauter
9. #46 - Ashton Lewis
10. #1 - Reed Sorenson

Failed to qualify: Joe Buford (#53), Kertus Davis (#0), Jason White (#71), Shane Hall (#28), Bruce Bechtel (#52), Kenny Hendrick (#51), Jimmy Kitchens (#77), Tina Gordon (#39), Todd Shafer (#40), Stan Boyd (#70), David Ragan (#95)

=== Aaron's 312 (Atlanta) ===
The Aaron's 312 was held on October 30 at Atlanta Motor Speedway. Mike Bliss won the pole.

Top ten results

1. #17 - Matt Kenseth
2. #5 - Kyle Busch
3. #38 - Kasey Kahne
4. #55 - Robby Gordon
5. #60 - Greg Biffle
6. #9 - Mark Martin
7. #23 - Kenny Wallace
8. #32 - David Stremme
9. #8 - Martin Truex Jr.
10. #18 - J. J. Yeley

Failed to qualify: John Hayden (#16), Blake Mallory (#51), Kevin Conway (#67), Todd Bodine (#31), Tina Gordon (#39), Mark Gibson (#34), Jimmy Kitchens (#77)

=== Bashas' Supermarkets 200 ===
The Bashas' Supermarkets 200 was held on November 6 at Phoenix International Raceway. Kyle Busch won the pole.

Top ten results

1. #41 - Jamie McMurray
2. #5 - Kyle Busch
3. #8 - Martin Truex Jr.
4. #55 - Robby Gordon
5. #60 - Greg Biffle
6. #9 - Mark Martin
7. #66 - Rusty Wallace
8. #17 - Matt Kenseth
9. #46 - Ashton Lewis
10. #00 - Tony Raines

Failed to qualify: Eric Jones (#73), Charlie Bradberry (#85), Kevin Lepage (#71), Brad Teague (#52), Johnny Borneman III (#83), Kertus Davis (#0), Joey Miller (#98), Mike Harmon (#54), Clint Vahsholtz (#90), Tina Gordon (#39), Kenny Hendrick (#51)

=== BI-LO 200 ===
The final BI-LO 200 was held on November 13 at Darlington Raceway. Martin Truex Jr. won the pole.

Top ten results

1. #66 - Jamie McMurray
2. #46 - Ashton Lewis
3. #20 - Mike Bliss
4. #8 - Martin Truex Jr.*
5. #17 - Matt Kenseth
6. #1 - Casey Mears
7. #23 - Kenny Wallace
8. #18 - Denny Hamlin*
9. #41 - Reed Sorenson
10. #99 - Michael Waltrip

Failed to qualify: Blake Mallory (#28), Kevin Lepage (#71), Dion Ciccarelli (#84), Randy Briggs (#85), Norm Benning (#81), Mike Harmon (#54), Jimmy Spencer (#98), Carl Long (#83)

- Martin Truex Jr. won the NASCAR Busch Series championship in this race, marking the first time in the track's 55-year history a NASCAR champion had been crowned at the track.
- Kyle Busch's championship run effectively ended in a lap 28 crash with Ron Hornaday Jr. and Greg Biffle. Busch never recovered, and eventually crashed again on lap 101. Busch ultimately finished 33rd.
- This is Denny Hamlin’s first career Busch Series start.

=== Ford 300 ===
The Ford 300 was held on November 20 at Homestead-Miami Speedway. Casey Mears won the pole.

Top ten results

1. #29 - Kevin Harvick
2. #66 - Jamie McMurray
3. #5 - Kyle Busch
4. #41 - Reed Sorenson
5. #31 - Todd Bodine
6. #17 - Matt Kenseth
7. #2 - Ron Hornaday Jr.
8. #87 - Joe Nemechek
9. #8 - Martin Truex Jr.
10. #60 - Greg Biffle

Failed to qualify: Kertus Davis (#0), Mark Green (#26), Eric McClure (#04), Kevin Lepage (#71), Gus Wasson (#10), Tina Gordon (#39), Dion Ciccarelli (#84), Jimmy Kitchens (#77), Jeff Fuller (#88), Blake Mallory (#28)

== Results and standings ==
=== Races ===
No.	Race	Pole position	Most laps led	Winning driver	Manufacturer	No.	Team
1	Hershey's Kisses 300	Martin Truex Jr.	Dale Earnhardt Jr.	Dale Earnhardt Jr.	Chevrolet	8	Chance 2 Motorsports
2	Goody's Headache Powder 200	Johnny Benson	Martin Truex Jr.	Jamie McMurray	Dodge	30	Braun Racing
3	Sam's Town 300	Mike Bliss	Matt Kenseth	Kevin Harvick	Chevrolet	21	Richard Childress Racing
4	Diamond Hill Plywood 200	Kyle Busch	Greg Biffle	Greg Biffle	Ford	60	Roush Racing
5	Sharpie Professional 250	Greg Biffle	Martin Truex Jr.	Martin Truex Jr.	Chevrolet	8	Chance 2 Motorsports
6	O'Reilly 300	Kyle Busch	Kyle Busch	Matt Kenseth	Ford	17	Roush Racing
7	Pepsi 300	Martin Truex Jr.	Clint Bowyer	Michael Waltrip	Chevrolet	99	Michael Waltrip Racing
8	Aaron's 312	Clint Bowyer	Robby Gordon	Martin Truex Jr.	Chevrolet	8	Chance 2 Motorsports
9	Stater Brothers 300 Presented by Gatorade	Jason Leffler	Matt Kenseth	Greg Biffle	Ford	60	Roush Racing
10	Charter 250	Martin Truex Jr.	Martin Truex Jr.	Martin Truex Jr.	Chevrolet	8	Chance 2 Motorsports
11	Funai 250	Kyle Busch	Kyle Busch	Kyle Busch	Chevrolet	5	Hendrick Motorsports
12	Goulds Pumps/ITT Industries 200	Kyle Busch	Bobby Hamilton Jr.	Martin Truex Jr.	Chevrolet	8	Chance 2 Motorsports
13	Carquest Auto Parts 300	Greg Biffle	Kyle Busch	Kyle Busch	Chevrolet	5	Hendrick Motorsports
14	MBNA America 200	David Green	Martin Truex Jr.	Greg Biffle	Ford	60	Roush Racing
15	Federated Auto Parts 300	Martin Truex Jr.	Jason Leffler	Jason Leffler	Chevrolet	00	Haas CNC Racing
16	Meijer 300 presented by Oreo	Martin Truex Jr.	Bobby Hamilton Jr.	Kyle Busch	Chevrolet	5	Hendrick Motorsports
17	Alan Kulwicki 250	David Stremme	Shane Hmiel	Ron Hornaday Jr.	Chevrolet	2	Richard Childress Racing
18	Winn-Dixie 250 presented by PepsiCo	Mike Bliss	Dale Earnhardt Jr.	Mike Wallace	Ford	4	Biagi Brothers Racing
19	Tropicana Twister 300	Bobby Hamilton Jr.	Kyle Busch	Justin Labonte	Dodge	44	Labonte Motorsports
20	Siemens 200	Jamie McMurray	Ron Hornaday Jr.	Matt Kenseth	Ford	17	Roush Racing
21	ITT Industries & Goulds Pumps Salute to the Troops 250	Martin Truex Jr.	Martin Truex Jr.	Greg Biffle	Ford	60	Roush Racing
22	Kroger 200	Johnny Sauter	Johnny Sauter	Kyle Busch	Chevrolet	5	Hendrick Motorsports
23	Cabela's 250	Martin Truex Jr.	Kyle Busch	Kyle Busch	Chevrolet	5	Hendrick Motorsports
24	Food City 250	Dale Earnhardt Jr.	Dale Earnhardt Jr.	Dale Earnhardt Jr.	Chevrolet	81	Chance 2 Motorsports
25	Target House 300	Casey Mears	Greg Biffle	Greg Biffle	Ford	60	Roush Racing
26	Emerson Radio 250	Kasey Kahne	Kasey Kahne	Robby Gordon	Chevrolet	55	Robby Gordon Motorsports
27	Stacker 200 Presented by YJ Stinger	Kasey Kahne	Kenny Wallace	Martin Truex Jr.	Chevrolet	8	Chance 2 Motorsports
28	Mr. Goodcents 300	Paul Menard	Tony Stewart	Joe Nemechek	Chevrolet	87	NEMCO Motorsports
29	Lowe's presents the SpongeBob SquarePants Movie 300	Casey Mears	Casey Mears	Mike Bliss	Chevrolet	20	Joe Gibbs Racing
30	Sam's Town 250 benefitting St. Jude	Martin Truex Jr.	Martin Truex Jr.	Martin Truex Jr.	Chevrolet	8	Chance 2 Motorsports
31	Aaron's 312	Mike Bliss	Matt Kenseth	Matt Kenseth	Ford	17	Roush Racing
32	Bashas' Supermarkets 200	Kyle Busch	Kyle Busch	Jamie McMurray	Dodge	41	Chip Ganassi Racing
33	BI-LO 200	Martin Truex Jr.	Jamie McMurray	Jamie McMurray	Dodge	66	Rusty Wallace, Inc.
34	Ford 300	Casey Mears	Kevin Harvick	Kevin Harvick	Chevrolet	29	Richard Childress Racing

=== Drivers' Championship ===
(key) Bold – Pole position awarded by time. Italics – Pole position set by 2004 Owner's points. * – Led most laps.

Pos	Driver	DAY	CAR	LVS	DAR	BRI	TEX	NSH	TAL	CAL	GTW	RCH	NAZ	CLT	DOV	NSH	KEN	MIL	DAY	CHI	NHA	PPR	IRP	MCH	BRI	CAL	RCH	DOV	KAN	CLT	MEM	ATL	PHO	DAR	HOM	Pts
1	Martin Truex Jr.	**28**	2*	14	4	1*	10	**23**	1	13	**1***	7	1	14	2*	**2**	6	9	3	14	11	**5***	4	3	7	6	3	1	30	6	**1***	9	3	4	9	5173
2	Kyle Busch **(R)**	24	7	15	**17**	3	**2***	6	4	7	5	**1***	**10**	1*	5	17	1	16	11	12*	25	17	1	1*	3	9	5	9	29	5	14	2	**2***	33	3	4943
3	Greg Biffle	11	38	10	1*	4	34	40	21	1	7	2	32	**6**	1	13	2	7	2	32	30	1	5	8	33	1*	11	14	2	4	2	5	5	37	10	4568
4	Ron Hornaday Jr.	7	10	26	23	9	17	31	3	11	2	12	11	7	29	5	4	1	9	10	6*	11	35	18	20	29	21	7	5	15	3	14	28	27	7	4258
5	Mike Bliss	30	13	**12**	10	17	18	8	39	17	17	8	33	16	19	4	3	6	**5**	33	32	6	7	10	21	16	6	18	19	1	5	**27**	12	3	27	4115
6	Jason Keller	9	12	8	13	8	12	13	12	19	3	5	4	31	13	33	5	3	18	2	26	13	19	16	8	22	39	12	7	30	6	35	29	16	13	4088
7	David Green	10	5	11	3	5	8	10	9	25	11	6	3	23	**3**	34	13	8	34	8	21	8	10	32	5	15	14	10	35	13	24	16	16	29	42	4082
8	Ashton Lewis	14	15	29	20	31	33	21	17	14	15	15	23	10	25	9	8	13	14	5	17	18	14	13	26	23	20	21	4	35	9	12	9	2	14	3892
9	Kenny Wallace	12	16	25	12	16	37	18	6	9	33	9	9	9	11	18	33	25	30	36	7	14	9	19	14	13	33	20*	15	9	13	7	22	7	19	3851
10	David Stremme	6	36	3	5	18	27	32	40	26	8	35	5	8	34	35	9	**2**	28	34	28	7	11	11	6	36	8	16	3	34	7	8	21	31	12	3738
11	Kasey Kahne	43	26	2	11	27	32	3	38	5	13	10	16	25	7	6	17		6	4	4			5	34	4	**9***	**3**	13	36		3	11	11	18	3713
12	Jason Leffler	8	32	22	14	32	6	9	5	**34**	6	11	7	4	14	1*	7	15	13	7	3	3	3	7	17	10	4	4								3661
13	Michael Waltrip	19	4	4	8	7	13	1	8	6	14	28	8	11	16	38	14		27	18			26	24	27	14	30	11	12	23	29	22	19	10	11	3649
14	Stacy Compton	31	20	17	15	19	28	14	23	3	20	18	12	26	17	10	19	20	42	21	8	2	18	31	11	24	32	29	9	26	16	17	23	20	15	3614
15	Robert Pressley	17	23	24	22	22	24	11	14	27	36	20	19	20	15	15	16	14	4	35	13	19	22	28	9	25	17	22	20	16	17	13	17	13	24	3604
16	Tim Fedewa	16	18	7	16	12	15	12	37	31	9	17	15	42	9	11	34	17	10	17	2	25	34	23	16	27	35	13	38	31	23	33	18	14	21	3480
17	Mike Wallace	35	17	20	36	10	19	38	11	20	41	32	14	29	28	12	31	11	1	15	10	23	21	9	13	18	19	25	18	19	30	21	27	17	25	3461
18	Johnny Sauter	2	6	16	27	14	16	2	31	24	18	31	22	36	10	31	25	31	29	19	27	29	**2***	15	32	17	10	5	21	41	8	43	35	21	38	3411
19	Casey Atwood	15	19	36	9	34	21	20	13	29	23	14	6	17	18	7	22	32	24	13	31	9	8	25	10	26	2	24	22	20						3130
20	Kevin Harvick	4	3	1	21	2				8		3		3	6				8	41	5			30	4	3	7	6		11		15	13	23	1*	3129
21	Robby Gordon	3	14	19	7	23	3	5	7*	12	10	19	Wth		32	14	12		26	6			15	12	39		1		14	29		4	4		37	3105
22	Bobby Hamilton Jr.	13	8	5	19	24	5	27	24	10	4	4	2*	13	4	23	28*	5	12	**43**	9	10	6	29												2896
23	Paul Menard **(R)**	32	22	21	26	28	14	16	16	28	22	33	13	19	21		QL				18	12	20	DNQ	36	21	13	15	**17**	DNQ	11	19	14	12	34	2742
24	Hermie Sadler	23	34	37	18	20	25	22	30	37	21	29	24	41	22	26	21	12	21	25	38	21	43	21	28		22		42	39			40	25	20	2414
25	Matt Kenseth	5		6*			1			4*					35					16	1			42	2	12			33	2		1*	8	5	6	2253
26	Gus Wasson	18	29	35	31	35	40	33	DNQ	36	25	25	26	24	33	22	35	28	37	29	24	31	37	26	40	31	36	28	28	DNQ	26	31	31	28	DNQ	2239
27	Derrike Cope	20	37	27	35	30	31	35	41	33	QL	27		27	27	24		22	35	38	37	43		34	24	32	28	32	31	38	32	30	30	30	40	2050
28	Steve Grissom	25	11	32	24	15			18				20	38			20	24		28	23	30	28	43	25	43	26	33	36	37	41	39	25	24	36	2011
29	Clint Bowyer **(R)**						36	4*	**22**		12		18			3	10	10		42		4	17						32	10	4	20		15	39	1933
30	J. J. Yeley **(R)**			23			42	19		23	16	23		15	26	8	11			9					15		15	35	6			10	15			1859
31	Joe Nemechek	40		9	28	11	7		10	43		36		21	36					31	16			36		8			1	43			26		8	1777
32	Jamie McMurray		1									41		2	8					27	**22**			40	23	5				8		36	1	1*	2	1765
33	Tony Raines					6	43	15	26	QL		16		12^{1}	12	41	15	34		20		16		35	29	19		36					10		35	1553
34	Casey Mears																		7		20			4	35	**2**	31	19	8	**7***		42	20	6	**26**	1511
35	Justin Labonte						29			41		22		18^{1}	31		30		33	1	19			14		28	DNQ	30		18		37	37	19	17	1415
36	Stanton Barrett	DNQ	QL			42	38	41		DNQ	42						37	18		DNQ	33	38		20	22	38	18	37	26	32	42	24		18	23	1330
37	Jeff Fuller		43	43	43	37	39	37	42	40	37	38	35	37	43	43	42	41	43	DNQ	43	42	39	41	41	42	42	43	43		43	40	43	38	DNQ	1221
38	Mike McLaughlin												QL				QL					QL			12	11	24	2	11	12	18	41	36	39	16	1140
39	Johnny Benson	41	**9**	34	6*	13	4	7	36	21	29					QL	29																			1136
40	Mark Green								QL	42	35^{1}	43	21		39	28	23	23			35	41	32		42		41		34	24	34	23	33		DNQ	1097
41	Travis Geisler **(R)**							24			40	26				21	39			23		22		22	30		23		27	DNQ	21					1002
42	Kevin Lepage													32	24				15	22	15			DNQ	18	30	DNQ	26	41	28		28	DNQ	DNQ	DNQ	956
43	Jimmy Kitchens	33	42	40	39			DNQ	32				43			39	27	27	41	DNQ	29	32	DNQ	27	37	40	DNQ	41	DNQ	DNQ	DNQ	DNQ			DNQ	901
44	Shane Hmiel									32	28		QL	35	41			4*					12									34	32	22	22	868
45	Regan Smith	DNQ	39		30	21		17			19	40	QL	DNQ		37	32			26		15									QL					802
46	Aaron Fike **(R)**		35					39					30			36							23				43	17	39	33	35		34	42	33	802
47	Brad Teague		41		42	26	DNQ	42		39	DNQ	DNQ	31	28	30	42	DNQ	36	DNQ		40	35	DNQ		DNQ		40	40	DNQ	DNQ			DNQ	43		780
48	Stan Boyd **(R)**	DNQ		DNQ	41	25	DNQ	DNQ		38	32				38		43				39	39	27			39		DNQ	DNQ		DNQ			26	32	699
49	Dale Earnhardt Jr.	1*							2										17*						**1***											677
50	Randy LaJoie			13			23			30			25						16											17	QL	32				673
51	Tina Gordon								28										32	30	36	26	40	39	38	41	DNQ	39	40	DNQ	DNQ	DNQ	DNQ	41	DNQ	666
52	Reed Sorenson																						13								10	29		9	4	637
53	Todd Bodine											24			20					24	14						DNQ					DNQ		32	5	628
54	Shane Hall										31			40		25			19			20	41			34		38	DNQ		DNQ			35		618
55	Andy Ponstein **(R)**		25	DNQ	34	29		34			34	30	27	33	37																					618
56	Mark Martin	DNQ																						2			12	8				6	6			617
57	Jeff Burton				2		9			16										3																598
58	Tony Stewart									2				5										DNQ					25*			11				563
59	Billy Parker **(R)**			28			26			22	43			43	42		24			37																514
60	Dave Blaney			33			22					21																		25	19		42			497
61	Wally Dallenbach Jr.	42																								20			10	40			24		29	484
62	Blake Feese																41						33					34	24	27	40	25				469
63	Jay Sauter					39		36						13		16	40								31		DNQ									453
64	Randy MacDonald							30	34	35			34			27					DNQ	24														426
65	Jason Schuler	29	27	31	32	38	41											42																		421
66	Shelby Howard																						24	DNQ			25	31			36	18				413
67	Mike Harmon	DNQ	30	39	29	41		DNQ	35									38	DNQ			DNQ									33		DNQ	DNQ		406
68	Bobby Labonte						11																	DNQ		7				14						402
69	Justin Ashburn	34	40	38	40	DNQ	DNQ	DNQ	29		38					DNQ	DNQ	30	40*^{1}																	394
70	David Reutimann		21					25		15	30																									379
71	Kenny Hendrick										39^{1}			39			18			40		36	DNQ			35		42	DNQ	DNQ	DNQ		DNQ			348
72	Kim Crosby	DNQ							20										31			40		38								38				314
73	Mark McFarland													22	23												16									306
74	Tracy Hines						20		25															17												303
75	Donnie Neuenberger **(R)**	38	33	41	38	43	DNQ		33																											300
76	Rusty Wallace																							6									7			296
77	Paul Wolfe	36	DNQ	18																	12															291
78	Damon Lusk **(R)**	21	24	DNQ	25																															284
79	Tim Sauter																	19					25				DNQ				39			40		283
80	Tyler Walker															QL	QL					27	30								12					282
81	John Graham																						31				29				28		38			274
82	Eric McClure			30																				33	43		DNQ			DNQ	22				DNQ	268
83	Todd Szegedy																	21		39				DNQ							15					264
84	Josh Richeson	27									27							40			42															244
85	Jason White				33	33						42						29													DNQ					241
86	David Starr			DNQ			30	29		DNQ	24																									240
87	David Keith	DNQ						43	19							DNQ			25		DNQ															228
88	Larry Hollenbeck	37							27										23	DNQ										DNQ						228
89	John Hayden															32						28	DNQ		DNQ				DNQ		27	DNQ				228
90	Clint Vahsholtz										DNQ					19	36					33							DNQ				DNQ			225
91	Rick Markle	26							43										20						DNQ											222
92	Jimmy Spencer																													22			39	DNQ	28	222
93	Kertus Davis																						29					27		DNQ	DNQ		DNQ	34	DNQ	219
94	C. W. Smith	39							15										39					DNQ												210
95	Jerry Hill										26				QL				22																	182
96	Brent Sherman																												37		37				30	177
97	Boston Reid																										37			42		26				174
98	Jimmie Johnson																													3						170
99	Larry Gunselman	22	31	DNQ																																167
100	Brian Sockwell												28	30													27			DNQ						161
101	Shane Wallace							DNQ			DNQ					20							38													152
102	Sterling Marlin																									37				21						152
103	Denny Hamlin																																	8		142
104	Mike Garvey							26					37																							137
105	Eric Jones																												23				DNQ		41	134
106	Ricky Craven																			11																130
107	Buckshot Jones															29	38																			125
108	Bruce Bechtel			DNQ			DNQ			DNQ												34				33					DNQ					125
109	Carl Long		28																	DNQ	41			QL										DNQ		119
110	Eddie Beahr		DNQ		DNQ			DNQ				DNQ	36			DNQ		33									DNQ									119
111	Bobby Hamilton																						16													115
112	Brandon Miller															QL	QL												16							115
113	Jeff Purvis												17																							112
114	Bill Hoff												37					35			DNQ							DNQ								110
115	Jeremy Mayfield									18																						QL				109
116	Carl Edwards																								19											106
117	Morgan Shepherd					40		DNQ				34		DNQ											DNQ	DNQ		DNQ	DNQ	Wth						104
118	Lowell Bennett																						36				38									104
119	Bill Elliott																														20					103
120	Kerry Earnhardt																											23								94
121	Shane Sieg		DNQ	42	37																															89
122	Butch Jarvis					DNQ						DNQ	40					39					DNQ													89
123	Travis Kittleson																														25					88
124	Jamie Mosley																26																			85
125	Bobby Dotter																	26																		85
126	Mike Potter					DNQ							39					43							DNQ		DNQ									80
127	Caleb Holman							28																	DNQ											79
128	Dion Ciccarelli										DNQ		29		DNQ						DNQ							DNQ						DNQ	DNQ	76
129	Johnny Borneman III									DNQ						30																	DNQ			73
130	Garrett Liberty																														31					70
131	David Ragan																														DNQ				31	70
132	Matt Kobyluck																				34							DNQ								61
133	Ted Musgrave																										34									61
134	Lance Hooper						35																													58
135	Jeff Spraker																		36																	55
136	Dana White													QL									DNQ											36		55
137	Chad Beahr											DNQ						37																		52
138	Roland Isaacs																					37	DNQ													52
139	Bill Eversole																							37					DNQ							52
140	Scott Lynch											39																		DNQ						51
141	Norm Benning	Wth			DNQ			DNQ					38																					DNQ		49
142	Keith Murt																		38																	49
143	Jamey Caudill																														38					49
144	Greg Sacks							DNQ							40																					43
145	David Eshleman															40																				43
146	Travis Powell												41																							40
147	Jason Jefferson																																41			40
148	Brian Tyler																						42													37
149	Jennifer Jo Cobb																																		43	34
150	Jason Rudd												42																							12
151	Chad Blount													34																						
152	Randy Briggs			DNQ		36					DNQ																		DNQ					DNQ		
153	Blake Mallory						DNQ													DNQ												DNQ		DNQ	DNQ	
154	Robby Benton	DNQ							DNQ																					DNQ						
155	Kevin Conway	DNQ																		DNQ												DNQ				
156	Joe Buford															DNQ									DNQ						DNQ					
157	Stuart Kirby																DNQ				DNQ															
158	Chris Horn																DNQ												DNQ							
159	Wayne Edwards																	Wth									DNQ									
160	Brian Conz	DNQ																																		
161	Jerry Reary		Wth																																	
162	Chad Chaffin							DNQ																												
163	Brad Baker							DNQ																												
164	Steven Christian															DNQ																				
165	Shawna Robinson																DNQ																			
166	Ron Barfield Jr.																					DNQ														
167	Ryck Sanders																					DNQ														
168	Tim Edwards																					DNQ														
169	Cam Strader																								DNQ											
170	Jimmy Henderson																													DNQ						
171	Todd Shafer																														DNQ					
172	Mark Gibson																															DNQ				
173	Charlie Bradberry																																DNQ			
174	Joey Miller																																DNQ			
175	David Gilliland																																		QL	
Pos	Driver	DAY	CAR	LVS	DAR	BRI	TEX	NSH	TAL	CAL	GTW	RCH	NAZ	CLT	DOV	NSH	KEN	MIL	DAY	CHI	NHA	PPR	IRP	MCH	BRI	CAL	RCH	DOV	KAN	CLT	MEM	ATL	PHO	DAR	HOM	Pts

== Rookie of the Year ==
19-year-old Kyle Busch easily won Rookie of the Year honors in 2004, as he won five races and finished second in points. Runner-up Paul Menard started the year with Andy Petree Racing, then finished the season at Dale Earnhardt, Inc. Clint Bowyer and J. J. Yeley ran partial schedules and had seven and four top-tens, respectively, while Travis Geisler and Stan Boyd ran with teams on limited budgets. Last-place-finisher Billy Parker, younger brother of Hank Parker Jr., started the season with the new Rusty Wallace, Inc. team, but was released during the season.

== See also ==
- 2004 NASCAR Nextel Cup Series
- 2004 NASCAR Craftsman Truck Series
