= David Keith (racing driver) =

American racing driver (1973–2020)

- Born: William David Keith; December 27, 1973; Owensboro, Kentucky, U.S.
- Died: October 22, 2020 (aged 46)

NASCAR O'Reilly Auto Parts Series career
- 5 races run over 3 years
- Best finish: 87th (2004)
- First race: 2003 Winn-Dixie 250 (Daytona)
- Last race: 2004 Winn-Dixie 250 (Daytona)
Wins	Top tens	Poles
0	0	0

William David Keith (December 27, 1973 – October 22, 2020) was an American professional stock car racing driver and spotter.

== Racing career ==
Keith started racing go-karts at age nine and went on to win multiple championships. He went on to race in the NASCAR Winston Cup Series and the NASCAR Busch Series.

== Death ==
Keith died on October 22, 2020, at the age of 46.

== Motorsports career results ==
=== NASCAR ===
(key) (Bold – Pole position awarded by qualifying time. Italics – Pole position earned by points standings or practice time. * – Most laps led.)

==== Winston Cup Series ====
NASCAR Winston Cup Series results
Year	Team	No.	Make	1	2	3	4	5	6	7	8	9	10	11	12	13	14	15	16	17	18	19	20	21	22	23	24	25	26	27	28	29	30	31	32	33	34	35	36	NWCC	Pts	Ref
2000	Sadler Brothers Racing	95	Ford	DAY	CAR	LVS	ATL	DAR	BRI	TEX	MAR	TAL	CAL	RCH	CLT	DOV	MCH	POC	SON	DAY	NHA	POC	IND; DNQ	GLN	MCH; DNQ	BRI	DAR	RCH	NHA	DOV	MAR	CLT	TAL	CAR	PHO	HOM	ATL			N/A	0	
2001	CLR Racing	57	Ford	DAY	CAR	LVS	ATL	DAR	BRI	TEX	MAR	TAL	CAL	RCH	CLT	DOV	MCH	POC	SON	DAY	CHI	NHA	POC	IND; DNQ	GLN	MCH; DNQ	BRI	DAR	RCH	DOV	KAN	CLT	MAR	TAL	PHO	CAR	HOM	ATL	NHA	N/A	0	

==== Busch Series ====
NASCAR Busch Series results
Year	Team	No.	Make	1	2	3	4	5	6	7	8	9	10	11	12	13	14	15	16	17	18	19	20	21	22	23	24	25	26	27	28	29	30	31	32	33	34	NBSC	Pts	Ref
2000	Sadler Brothers Racing	95	Chevy	DAY	CAR	LVS	ATL	DAR	BRI	TEX	NSV; DNQ	TAL	CAL	RCH	NHA	CLT	DOV	SBO	MYB	GLN	MLW	NZH	PPR	GTY	IRP	MCH	BRI	DAR	RCH	DOV	CLT	CAR	MEM	PHO	HOM			N/A	0	
2003	Sadler Brothers Racing	95	Ford	DAY	CAR	LVS	DAR	BRI	TEX	TAL	NSH	CAL	RCH	GTY	NZH	CLT	DOV	NSH	KEN	MLW	DAY; 41	CHI	NHA	PPR	IRP	MCH	BRI	DAR	RCH	DOV	KAN	CLT	MEM; 32	ATL	PHO	CAR	HOM	118th	107	
2004	Sadler Brothers Racing	95	Ford	DAY; DNQ	CAR	LVS	DAR	BRI	TEX		TAL; 19	CAL	GTY	RCH	NZH	CLT	DOV				DAY; 25	CHI																87th	228	
2004	Sadler Brothers Racing	95	Chevy							NSH; 43																												87th	228	
2004	Davis Motorsports	0	Chevy															NSH; DNQ	KEN	MLW			NHA; DNQ	PPR	IRP	MCH	BRI	CAL	RCH	DOV	KAN	CLT	MEM	ATL	PHO	DAR	HOM	87th	228	

=== ARCA Re/Max Series ===
(key) (Bold – Pole position awarded by qualifying time. Italics – Pole position earned by points standings or practice time. * – Most laps led.)

ARCA Re/Max Series results
Year	Team	No.	Make	1	2	3	4	5	6	7	8	9	10	11	12	13	14	15	16	17	18	19	20	21	22	23	24	25	ARMC	Pts	Ref
1999	Michael Kranefuss Racing	8	Ford	DAY	**ATL**; 10	SLM	AND	CLT	**MCH**; 1*	POC; 8	TOL	SBS	BLN	POC; 40	KIL	FRS	FLM	ISF	WIN	DSF	SLM	CLT; 12	TAL	ATL; 36					36th	925	
2000	Sadler Brothers Racing	95	Ford	DAY; 1	SLM	AND	CLT; 40	KIL	FRS	MCH; 2	POC; 33	TOL	**KEN**; 34	BLN	**POC**; 41	WIN	ISF	KEN	DSF	SLM	CLT; 3	TAL; 1*	ATL; 3						25th	1380	
2001	Sadler Brothers Racing	95	Ford	DAY; 41	NSH	WIN	SLM	GTY	KEN																				56th	625	
2001	CLR Racing	57	Ford							CLT; 5	KAN	MCH; 7	POC; 19	MEM	GLN	KEN	MCH	POC	NSH	ISF	CHI	DSF	SLM	TOL	BLN	CLT	TAL	ATL	56th	625	
2003	Sadler Brothers Racing	95	Ford	DAY	ATL	NSH	SLM	TOL	KEN	CLT	BLN	KAN	MCH	LER	POC	POC	NSH; 34	ISF	WIN	DSF	CHI	SLM	TAL	CLT	SBO				182nd	60	
