= Travis Geisler =

American racing executive, crew chief, and driver

- Born: November 8, 1980 (age 46); Pittsburgh, Pennsylvania, U.S.

NASCAR O'Reilly Auto Parts Series career
- 12 races run over 2 years
- 2005 position: N/A
- Best finish: 41st (2004)
- First race: 2004 Pepsi 300 (Nashville)
- Last race: 2004 Sam's Town 250 (Memphis)
Wins	Top tens	Poles
0	0	0
- Statistics up to date as of September 7, 2020.

Travis Geisler (born November 8, 1980) is an American professional stock car racing team executive, crew chief, and former driver. He is currently the competition director for Team Penske. He previously was a crew chief for Penske on their No. 77 Dodge driven by Sam Hornish Jr. from partway through 2008 to 2010. Prior to that, he was a driver, competing in the NASCAR Busch Series (now Xfinity) in 2004 for the No. 36 DCT Motorsports team.

== Racing career ==
=== Crew member, crew chief and competition director career ===
Geisler began working as a crew member in NASCAR when he was driving the DCT No. 36, as he was also an engineer for the underdog team. In November 2006, Geisler joined Penske Racing as the engineer for Ryan Newman's No. 12 Dodge. He had spent the rest of that year, his first as a full-time crew member, at Robert Yates Racing, where he had been an engineer on Busch and Cup Series cars for the team. Geisler became a crew chief for the first time in August 2008, when Penske decided to replace Sam Hornish Jr.'s crew chief, Chris Carrier, after the No. 77 team had dismal performances throughout the season and was not as competitive as Penske's other two Cup Series cars. However, even after Geisler's promotion into the crew chief role, things did not get any better and Hornish would finish 35th in the standings, fall out of the top-35 in owner points and fail to qualify for two races (Talladega and Homestead-Miami), and lose the rookie of the year award to Regan Smith. Geisler returned as the crew chief of the No. 77 in 2009, and the team would see an uptick in performance. Hornish earned seven top-ten finishes that year, two of which were top-fives, which resulted in him finishing the year 28th in the standings. In addition, he won the Sprint Showdown. For 2010, the last year of the pairing, Hornish only recorded one top-ten finish (at New Hampshire in September), but still only finished one spot lower in the standings, 29th. In 2011, the No. 77 team would close down due to sponsor Mobil 1 moving to Stewart–Haas Racing, and Penske cut back from three full-time Cup teams to two. Hornish would be demoted to Penske's Nationwide Series program, where he drove the No. 12 car, replacing Justin Allgaier, who left for Turner Motorsports. However, Geisler would instead be promoted to competition director at Penske, a position he has remained in ever since. In 2020, Geisler would return to the pit box for the first time in ten years, as he served as the interim crew chief for Penske's No. 12 Ford of Ryan Blaney in the Southern 500 after Todd Gordon was suspended for the race due to the car's improperly installed ballast.

== Personal life ==
Originally from Pittsburgh, Geisler currently lives in Davidson, North Carolina (in the Charlotte metropolitan area where NASCAR teams are based) with his wife and two sons. He attended Vanderbilt University and earned a degree in mechanical engineering.

== Motorsports career results ==
=== NASCAR ===
(key) (Bold – Pole position awarded by qualifying time. Italics – Pole position earned by points standings or practice time. * – Most laps led.)

==== Busch Series ====
NASCAR Busch Series results
Year	Team	No.	Make	1	2	3	4	5	6	7	8	9	10	11	12	13	14	15	16	17	18	19	20	21	22	23	24	25	26	27	28	29	30	31	32	33	34	35	NBSC	Pts	Ref
2004	DCT Motorsports	36	Chevy	DAY	CAR	LVS	DAR	BRI	TEX	NSH; 24	TAL	CAL	GTY; 40	RCH; 26	NZH	CLT	DOV	NSH; 21	KEN; 39	MLW	DAY	CHI; 23	NHA	PPR; 22	IRP	MCH; 22	BRI; 30	CAL	RCH; 23	DOV	KAN; 27	CLT; DNQ	MEM; 21	ATL	PHO	DAR	HOM		41st	1002	
2005	MacDonald Motorsports	72	Chevy	DAY	CAL	MXC	LVS	ATL	NSH	BRI	TEX	PHO	TAL	DAR	RCH	CLT	DOV	NSH	KEN	MLW	DAY	CHI	NHA	PPR	GTY	IRP	GLN	MCH	BRI	CAL	RCH	DOV	KAN	CLT	MEM; DNQ	TEX	PHO	HOM	N/A	0	

=== ARCA Re/Max Series ===
(key) (Bold – Pole position awarded by qualifying time. Italics – Pole position earned by points standings or practice time. * – Most laps led.)

ARCA Re/Max Series results
Year	Team	No.	Make	1	2	3	4	5	6	7	8	9	10	11	12	13	14	15	16	17	18	19	20	21	22	ARMC	Pts	Ref
2003	Bob Aiello	62	Ford	DAY	ATL	NSH	SLM	TOL	KEN	CLT	BLN	KAN	MCH	LER	POC	POC	NSH	ISF	WIN	DSF	CHI	SLM	TAL	CLT	SBO; 6	122nd	200	
