= Tina Gordon =

American racing driver (born 1969)

- Born: March 14, 1969 (age 57); Cedar Bluff, Alabama, U.S.

NASCAR O'Reilly Auto Parts Series career
- 14 races run over 3 years
- Best finish: 51st (2004)
- First race: 2001 South Carolina 200 (Darlington)
- Last race: 2004 BI-LO 200 (Darlington)
Wins	Top tens	Poles
0	1	0

NASCAR FedEx Freight Truck Series career
- 16 races run over 2 years
- Best finish: 25th (2003)
- First race: 2003 Florida Dodge Dealers 250 (Daytona)
- Last race: 2004 Infineon 200 (Charlotte)
Wins	Top tens	Poles
0	0	0
- Statistics up to date as of November 29, 2012.

Tina Gordon (born March 14, 1969) is an American former stock car racing driver and spokesperson for the Sticks 'N' Stuff furniture chain. She is related to neither NASCAR driver Jeff Gordon nor Robby Gordon. After being released from her ride at Jay Robinson Racing in 2005 she retired from racing.

== Racing career ==
=== Local ===
Gordon competed in barrel racing, rodeos, and horse shows. Gordon began racing cars in her husband Gary's short track stock car in 1995-1996 at the Green Valley Speedway.She won all six events that she entered. They bought a hobby stock car and competed at Thunder Valley Speedway during 1997. In her rookie season, she finished tenth in points with 11 top-ten finished in 18 races. She sold her insurance agency and began racing full-time in 1998, first at Green Valley then at Birmingham International Raceway.

Gordon moved to the NASCAR All-Pro Series in 1999; she finished 20th in touring truck series' points.

=== ARCA Re/Max Series ===
Gordon debuted in ARCA on October 20, 2001 at the Food World 300 held at the Talladega Superspeedway driving the No. 22 Sticks 'N' Stuff Furniture Ford. She qualified fifth and finished tenth, just behind future NASCAR journeyman Casey Mears.

In 2002, Gordon competed in four ARCA races, two driving the renumbered No. 66 Sticks 'N' Stuff Ford and two driving the No. 66 3M Post-it Note Ford. Driving the Sticks 'N' Stuff Ford she finished 26th in the Discount Auto Parts 300 at Daytona International Speedway and 12th later that year back at the Food World 300 at Talladega. In the 3M Post-it Note Ford, she finished eighth in the Pork, The Other White Meat 400 at the Atlanta Motor Speedway and 35th in the EasyCare Vehicle Services 100 at Lowe's Motor Speedway in Charlotte NC. Gordon crashed out of the EasyCare Vehicle Services 100 and suffered leg and foot injuries causing her not to race or practice until September of that year.

=== Busch Series ===
Gordon made her Busch Series debut in September 2001 at Darlington Raceway. She drove the locally based No. 96 Colby Furniture Chevrolet into the field with a 42nd starting position. However, without full sponsorship, the team decided to start and park, finishing last (43rd) after only competing one lap.

Gordon's next race was her best career outing. She drove the No. 22 Bost Motorsports Chevy in the 2003 race at Talladega Superspeedway. Starting 38th, Gordon was able to avoid a massive pileup on lap four. From there, she drove home to a 10th-place finish, completing all but one lap. She earned a top-10 in the race, where all but 12 cars were damaged or destroyed in the lap four crash, one of the largest in NASCAR history.

In 2004, Gordon made another start at Talladega, this time driving the No. 10 Sticks N' Stuff Chevy for Davis Motorsports. After starting 42nd, Gordon stayed in the race and finished 28th. For the rest of 2004, with sponsorship from Yahoo!, Vassarette and Microtel, Gordon secured the No. 39 Jay Robinson ride. Her first start for JRR was at Daytona International Speedway, where she finished 32nd. Gordon made 10 of her next 11 attempts before failing to qualify in five of her last six, which led to her release. Her best run with the team was a 26th at Pikes Peak and her best start was a 30th at Darlington.

Also in 2004, it appeared that during the Food City 250 in Bristol TN, Greg Biffle purposely crashed Gordon out of the race on lap 89 in retaliation for a slight bump to his left rear fender a half lap earlier.

=== Craftsman Truck Series ===
Gordon entered 2003 with the intent to run for NASCAR Craftsman Truck Series Rookie of the Year. She ran for the No. 31 Brevak Racing team with limited sponsorship from Scotch Tape and Microtel. However, the team did not qualify for all its races and Gordon only completed 11 before her sponsor ended her run. However, Gordon did well in those starts. She finished 13th at Charlotte and at Nashville and finished in the top-20 three other times. Despite limited racing, Gordon finished 25th in points.

In 2004, Gordon transferred over to the No. 13 ThorSport Racing Chevy, with sponsorship from Microtel and Vassarette. However, the deal quickly ended and she only was able to run five races. The best run was 24th at Daytona in the season opener. In the next race, at Atlanta, Gordon's Chevy was involved in a heavy wreck with Hank Parker Jr. and Rick Crawford, leading to minor injuries to Gordon. However, she was able to race in the next race at Martinsville. Gordon was able to set a career-best starting position in 2004 of 13th at Charlotte and Daytona.

Gordon retired after the 2005 season to be able to spend more time with her family.

== Personal life and post-racing career ==
Gordon currently lives in Cedar Bluff, Alabama with her husband and son. Despite no longer driving the Sticks 'N' Stuff-sponsored race car, Gordon continued to appear in the chain's television commercials announcing current specials. In the ads, she was captioned as "NASCAR driver" and "Sticks 'N' Stuff driver". Gordon and her husband have founded Tina's Dream Ranch, which is a therapeutic camp for disabled children and adults.

=== Political career ===
In early 2008, she announced her candidacy for the Cherokee County, Alabama Commission post for District 3. In the Democratic primary held on June 3, 2008, Gordon narrowly missed a runoff, running against a longtime incumbent and an influential local businessman.

== Motorsports career results ==
=== NASCAR ===
(key) (Bold – Pole position awarded by qualifying time. Italics – Pole position earned by points standings or practice time. * – Most laps led.)

==== Busch Series ====
NASCAR Busch Series results
Year	Year	No.	Make	1	2	3	4	5	6	7	8	9	10	11	12	13	14	15	16	17	18	19	20	21	22	23	24	25	26	27	28	29	30	31	32	33	34	NBGNC	Pts	Ref
2001	Chris Hoiles Motorsports	96	Pontiac	DAY	CAR	LVS	ATL	DAR	BRI	TEX	NSH	TAL	CAL	RCH	NHA	NZH	CLT	DOV	KEN	MLW	GLN	CHI	GTY	PPR	IRP	MCH	BRI	DAR; 43	RCH	DOV	KAN	CLT	MEM	PHO	CAR	HOM		155th	0	
2003	Bost Motorsports	22	Chevy	DAY	CAR	LVS	DAR	BRI	TEX	TAL; 10	NSH	CAL	RCH	GTY	NZH	CLT	DOV	NSH	KEN	MLW	DAY	CHI	NHA	PPR	IRP	MCH	BRI	DAR	RCH	DOV	KAN	CLT	MEM	ATL	PHO	CAR	HOM	110th	34	
2004	Davis Motorsports	10	Chevy	DAY	CAR	LVS	DAR	BRI	TEX	NSH	TAL; 28	CAL	GTY	RCH	NZH	CLT	DOV	NSH	KEN	MLW																		51st	379	
2004	Jay Robinson Racing	39	Ford																		DAY; 32	CHI; 30	NHA; 36	PPR; 26	IRP; 40	MCH; 39	BRI; 38	CAL; 41	RCH; DNQ	DOV; 39	KAN; 40	CLT; DNQ	MEM; DNQ	ATL; DNQ	PHO; DNQ	DAR; 41	HOM; DNQ	51st	379	

==== Craftsman Truck Series ====
NASCAR Craftsman Truck Series results
Year	Team	No.	Make	1	2	3	4	5	6	7	8	9	10	11	12	13	14	15	16	17	18	19	20	21	22	23	24	25	NCTC	Pts	Ref
2003	Brevak Racing	31	Dodge	DAY; 22	DAR; 18	MMR; 17	MAR; DNQ	CLT; 13	DOV; 19	TEX; 22	MEM	MLW; 25	KAN; 31	KEN; 21	GTW	MCH	IRP												25th	1112	
2003	Brevak Racing	31	Chevy															NSH; 13	BRI	RCH; 26	NHA	CAL	LVS; DNQ	SBO	TEX	MAR	PHO	HOM	25th	1112	
2004	ThorSport Racing	13	Chevy	DAY; 24	ATL; 35	MAR; 30	MFD; 34	CLT; 25	DOV	TEX	MEM	MLW	KAN	KEN	GTW	MCH	IRP	NSH	BRI	RCH	NHA	LVS	CAL	TEX	MAR	PHO	DAR	HOM	49th	371	

==== Goody's Dash Series ====
NASCAR Goody's Dash Series results
Year	Team	No.	Make	1	2	3	4	5	6	7	8	9	10	11	12	13	14	15	16	17	18	NGDS	Pts	Ref
2000	N/A	97	Pontiac	DAY; DNQ	MON	STA	JAC	CAR	CLT	SBO	ROU	LOU	SUM	GRE	SNM	MYB	BRI	HCY	JAC	USA	LAN	86th	28	

=== ARCA Re/Max Series ===
(key) (Bold – Pole position awarded by qualifying time. Italics – Pole position earned by points standings or practice time. * – Most laps led.)

ARCA Re/Max Series results
Year	Team	No.	Make	1	2	3	4	5	6	7	8	9	10	11	12	13	14	15	16	17	18	19	20	21	22	23	24	25	ARSC	Pts	Ref
2001	WP Motorsports	22	Ford	DAY	NSH	WIN	SLM	GTY	KEN	CLT	KAN	MCH	POC	MEM	GLN	KEN	MCH	POC	NSH	ISF	CHI	DSF	SLM	TOL	BLN	CLT	TAL	ATL; 10	122nd	185	
2002	Midway Phoenix Racing	66	Ford	DAY; 26	ATL; 8	NSH	SLM	KEN	CLT; 35	KAN	POC	MCH	TOL	SBO	KEN	BLN	POC	NSH	ISF	WIN	DSF	CHI	SLM	TAL; 12	CLT				56th	515	
