= David Eshleman =

American racing driver and politician (1947–2021)

- Born: David Ross Eshlman; February 20, 1947; Fontana, California, U.S.
- Died: May 8, 2021 (aged 74)

NASCAR O'Reilly Auto Parts Series career
- 1 race run over 1 year
- Best finish: 145th (2004)
- First race: 2004 Federated Auto Parts 200 (Nashville)
Wins	Top tens	Poles
0	0	0
- Statistics up to date as of November 7, 2024.

David Ross Eshleman (born February 20, 1947 – May 8, 2021) was an American professional stock car racing driver and politician who has previously competed in the NASCAR Busch Series, and the NASCAR AutoZone West Series. He also served as the mayor of Fontana, California for two terms from 1994 to 2002.

Eshleman also competed in the NASCAR Busch North Series.

== Motorsports career results ==
=== NASCAR ===
(key) (Bold - Pole position awarded by qualifying time. Italics - Pole position earned by points standings or practice time. * – Most laps led.)

==== Busch Series ====
NASCAR Busch Series results
Year	Team	No.	Make	1	2	3	4	5	6	7	8	9	10	11	12	13	14	15	16	17	18	19	20	21	22	23	24	25	26	27	28	29	30	31	32	33	34	NBSC	Pts	Ref
2004	Ware Racing Enterprises	51	Chevy	DAY	CAR	LVS	DAR	BRI	TEX	NSH	TAL	CAL	GTY	RCH	NZH	CLT	DOV	NSH; 40	KEN	MLW	DAY	CHI	NHA	PPR	IRP	MCH	BRI	CAL	RCH	DOV	KAN	CLT	MEM	ATL	PHO	DAR	HOM	145th	43	

==== Busch North Series ====
NASCAR Busch North Series results
Year	Team	No.	Make	1	2	3	4	5	6	7	8	9	10	11	12	13	NBNSC	Pts	Ref
2004	David Eshleman	11	Chevy	LEE	TMP	LRP	SEE	STA	HOL	ERI	WFD	NHA; 34	ADI	GLN	NHA	DOV	65th	61	

==== Autozone West Series ====
NASCAR Autozone West Series results
Year	Team	No.	Make	1	2	3	4	5	6	7	8	9	10	11	12	13	NAWSC	Pts	Ref
2003	David Eshleman	11	Chevy	PHO; 14	LVS; 14	CAL; 19	MAD; 18	TCR; 14	EVG; 21	IRW; 19	S99	RMR; 18	DCS; 15	PHO; DNQ	MMR; 18		14th	1214	
2004	David Eshleman	11	Chevy	PHO; 17	MMR; 18	CAL; 16	S99; 15	EVG; 17	IRW; 21	S99; 12							18th	1023	
2004	David Eshleman	6	Chevy								RMR; 15	DCS	PHO; 17	CNS	MMR	IRW	18th	1023	
2005	David Eshleman	6	Chevy	PHO; 32	MMR; 18							CAL; 24	DCS	CTS	MMR		27th	385	
2005	David Eshleman	6	Pontiac			PHO; 15	S99										27th	385	
2005	David Eshleman	11	Pontiac					IRW; 22	EVG	S99	PPR						27th	385	
2006	David Eshleman	11	Chevy	PHO; 32													53rd	143	
2006	David Eshleman	6	Chevy		PHO; 29	S99	IRW	SON	DCS	IRW	EVG	S99	CAL	CTS	AMP		53rd	143	
