= Jason Rudd =

American racing driver

- Born: April 15, 1979 (age 47); Chesapeake, Virginia, U.S.

NASCAR O'Reilly Auto Parts Series career
- 9 races run over 3 years
- 2004 position: 150th
- Best finish: 64th (2001)
- First race: 2001 Alltel 200 (Rockingham)
- Last race: 2004 Goulds Pumps/ITT Industries 200 (Nazareth)
Wins	Top tens	Poles
0	0	0

Jason Rudd (born April 15, 1979) is an American former professional stock car racing driver. Last racing for Means Racing in the NASCAR Busch Series, Rudd never ran a full-time season. He is the nephew of former NASCAR Cup Series driver Ricky Rudd.

== Career ==
Rudd started his NASCAR career in 1999, trying and failing to qualify for both Richmond races in the NASCAR Busch Series. After not trying to run any races in 2000, Rudd returned to NASCAR competition in 2001, racing for teams such as Means Racing, HighLine Performance Group, PRW Racing, and his grandfather Al Rudd's team. Rudd finished the season with a highest finish of 31st, and failing to qualify for two races, both while racing for his grandfather's team.

In 2002, Rudd moved down to ARCA, racing for his own team for six races. He would rack up one top-five and three top-tens in the six races he raced in. He finished the series 32nd in the overall standings. In 2003, Rudd returned to the Busch series, driving a race for JD Motorsports and Moy Racing each. However, he also failed to qualify for three races, racing for himself.

In 2004, Rudd returned to both the Busch Series and ARCA. In the Busch series, he raced a single race for Means Racing, staying in the race for eight laps before dropping out because of a vibration. Rudd's ARCA season didn't go quite as planned either, since although he made the two races he tried to race in, he was caught in a wreck early in the first race, and retired with a blown engine in the other.

In 2005, Rudd did not race in either series, but instead decided to try his shot at the NASCAR Craftsman Truck Series, but failed to qualify in both races he attempted. He has not attempted to run another NASCAR race since.

== Motorsports career results ==
=== NASCAR ===
(key) (Bold – Pole position awarded by qualifying time. Italics – Pole position earned by points standings or practice time. * – Most laps led.)

==== Busch Series ====
NASCAR Busch Series results
Year	Team	No.	Make	1	2	3	4	5	6	7	8	9	10	11	12	13	14	15	16	17	18	19	20	21	22	23	24	25	26	27	28	29	30	31	32	33	34	NBSC	Pts	Ref
1999		81		DAY	CAR	LVS	ATL	DAR	TEX	NSV	BRI	TAL	CAL	NHA	RCH; DNQ	NZH	CLT	DOV	SBO	GLN	MLW	MYB	PPR	GTY	IRP	MCH	BRI	DAR	RCH; DNQ	DOV	CLT	CAR	MEM	PHO	HOM			NA	-	
2001	Means Racing	52	Ford	DAY	CAR; 40	LVS	ATL	DAR	BRI	TEX	NSH	TAL	CAL																RCH; 31									64th	342	
2001	Moy Racing	77	Ford											RCH; 34	NHA	NZH	CLT																		CAR; 33	HOM		64th	342	
2001	Al Rudd Auto	85	Ford															DOV; 34	KEN	MLW	GLN	CHI	GTY	PPR	IRP	MCH	BRI	DAR			KAN; DNQ	CLT; DNQ	MEM	PHO				64th	342	
2001	Fitz Motorsports	8	Chevy																											DOV; 40								64th	342	
2003	Jason Rudd Motorsports	10	Dodge	DAY	CAR	LVS	DAR	BRI	TEX	TAL	NSH	CAL	RCH; DNQ	GTY	NZH	CLT	DOV	NSH	KEN; DNQ	MLW	DAY	CHI	NHA	PPR	IRP	MCH	BRI	DAR		DOV; DNQ	KAN	CLT	MEM	ATL	PHO	CAR	HOM	107th	143	
2003	Moy Racing	77	Ford																										RCH; 24									107th	143	
2003	JD Motorsports	70	Chevy																											DOV; 37								107th	143	
2004	Means Racing	52	Ford	DAY	CAR	LVS	DAR	BRI	TEX	NSH	TAL	CAL	GTY	RCH	NZH; 42	CLT	DOV	NSH	KEN	MLW	DAY	CHI	NHA	PPR	IRP	MCH	BRI	CAL	RCH	DOV	KAN	CLT	MEM	ATL	PHO	DAR	HOM	150th	12	

==== Craftsman Truck Series ====
NASCAR Craftsman Truck Series results
Year	Team	No.	Make	1	2	3	4	5	6	7	8	9	10	11	12	13	14	15	16	17	18	19	20	21	22	23	24	25	NCTC	Pts	Ref
2005	Brevak Racing	31	Dodge	DAY; DNQ	CAL; DNQ	ATL	MAR	GTY	MFD	CLT	DOV	TEX	MCH	MLW	KAN	KEN	MEM	IRP	NSH	BRI	RCH	NHA	LVS	MAR	ATL	TEX	PHO	HOM	NA	-	

=== ARCA Re/Max Series ===
(key) (Bold – Pole position awarded by qualifying time. Italics – Pole position earned by points standings or practice time. * – Most laps led.)

ARCA Re/Max Series results
Year	Team	No.	Make	1	2	3	4	5	6	7	8	9	10	11	12	13	14	15	16	17	18	19	20	21	22	ARMC	Pts	Ref
2002	Jason Rudd Motorsports	10	Dodge	DAY	ATL	NSH; 8	SLM	KEN; 3	CLT	KAN; 29	POC	MCH	TOL	SBO	KEN	BLN	POC; 9	NSH; 18	ISF	WIN	DSF	CHI	SLM	TAL	CLT; 24	32nd	925	
2004	Jason Rudd Motorsports	7	Ford	DAY	NSH	SLM	KEN	TOL	CLT	KAN	POC	MCH	SBO	BLN	KEN	GTW	POC; 25	LER								124th	175	
2004	Jason Rudd Motorsports	02	Ford																NSH; 32	ISF	TOL	DSF	CHI	SLM	TAL	124th	175	
