= Edward Howell (racing driver) =

American racing driver

- Nationality: American
- Born: Lakeland, Florida, U.S.

NASCAR Goody's Dash Series career
- Debut season: 1991
- Years active: 1991–2000
- Starts: 56
- Championships: 0
- Wins: 4
- Poles: 2
- Best finish: 4th in 1994
- Statistics up to date as of January 4, 2025.

Edward Howell (birth date unknown) is an American former professional stock car racing driver who competed in the NASCAR Goody's Dash Series from 1991 to 2000.

Howell also competed in the NASCAR All-American Challenge Series, the United Speed Alliance Racing Late Model Series, the SARA Late Model Series, and the Florida Pro Series.

== Motorsports results ==
=== NASCAR ===
(key) (Bold – Pole position awarded by qualifying time. Italics – Pole position earned by points standings or practice time. * – Most laps led.)

==== Goody's Dash Series ====
NASCAR Goody's Dash Series results
Year	Team	No.	Make	1	2	3	4	5	6	7	8	9	10	11	12	13	14	15	16	17	18	19	20	21	NGDS	Pts	Ref
1991	Crenshaw Racing	70	Pontiac	DAY	FIF	NRV	BGS	FLO	LAN	SUM	STH	LAN	BGS	HCY	MYB; 22	ACE	HCY	SHO	NSV						N/A	0	
1992	Crenshaw Racing	7	Pontiac	DAY; 26	HCY	LON	FLO	LAN	SUM	STH	BGS	MYB	NRV	SUM	ACE	HCY	VOL								N/A	85	
1993	N/A	N/A	Pontiac	DAY	NSV	SUM	VOL	MAR	LON	411	LAN	HCY	SUM	FLO	BGS	MYB	NRV; 23	HCY	VOL; 5						35th	249	
1994	Crenshaw Racing	7	Pontiac	DAY; 4																					4th	2534	
1994	Crenshaw Racing	07	Pontiac		VOL; 1	FLO; 3*	SUM; 1	CAR; 1	411; 20	HCY; 7	LAN; 2	BRI; 1	SUM; 3	FLO; 4	BGS; 2	MYB; 21	NRV; 15	ASH; 24	VOL; 4	HCY; 19					4th	2534	
1995	N/A	21	Dodge	DAY; 23	FLO	LAN																			27th	877	
1995	N/A	96	Pontiac				MYB; 8	SUM; 11	HCY; 23	CAR	STH	BRI	SUM; 20	GRE	BGS										27th	877	
1995	N/A	96	Ford													MYB; 26	NSV	FLO	NWS						27th	877	
1995	N/A	12	Dodge																	VOL; 6	HCY				27th	877	
1995	Amick Racing	35	Pontiac																			HOM; 28			27th	877	
1996	N/A	12	Dodge	DAY; 36	HOM; 38	MYB; 12	SUM; 15	NSV; 13	TRI	CAR	HCY	FLO	BRI; 19	SUM; 13	GRE	SNM	BGS	MYB	LAN	STH	FLO	NWS	VOL; 14	HCY	26th	824	
1997	Crenshaw Racing	70	Pontiac	DAY; 36	HOM	KIN	MYB	LAN	CAR	TRI	FLO	HCY	BRI	GRE	SNM	CLT	MYB	LAN	SUM	STA	HCY				75th	122	
1997	Moore Racing	99	Pontiac																			USA; 32	CON	HOM	75th	122	
1998	Crenshaw Racing	0	Pontiac	DAY	HCY	CAR	CLT	TRI	LAN	BRI	SUM	GRE	ROU	SNM	MYB	CON	HCY	LAN	STA	LOU	VOL	USA; 30			74th	140	
1998	Weaver Racing	2	Pontiac																				HOM; 32		74th	140	
1999	Crenshaw Racing	07	Pontiac	DAY	HCY; 2*	CAR; 19	CLT; 30	BRI	LOU	SUM	GRE; 5	ROU	STA; 5	MYB	HCY	LAN									26th	780	
1999	N/A	12	Dodge														USA; 14	JAC	LAN						26th	780	
2000	Crenshaw Racing	7	Pontiac	DAY; 4		STA; 2	JAC; 6	CAR; 5*																	24th	1203	
2000	Crenshaw Racing	07	Pontiac		MON; 11				CLT; 40	SBO; 26	ROU	LOU	SUM	GRE	SNM	MYB	BRI; 4	HCY	JAC						24th	1203	
2000	Crenshaw Racing	00	Pontiac																	USA; 6	LAN				24th	1203	
