= Bobby Dayton =

American racing driver

- Nationality: American
- Born: Spruce Pine, North Carolina, U.S.

NASCAR Goody's Dash Series career
- Debut season: 1996
- Years active: 1996–2001
- Starts: 48
- Championships: 0
- Wins: 0
- Poles: 0
- Best finish: 13th in 2000
- Statistics up to date as of December 31, 2024.

Bobby Dayton (birth date unknown) is an American former professional stock car racing driver who competed in the NASCAR Goody's Dash Series from 1996 to 2001.

== Motorsports results ==
=== NASCAR ===
(key) (Bold – Pole position awarded by qualifying time. Italics – Pole position earned by points standings or practice time. * – Most laps led.)

==== Goody's Dash Series ====
NASCAR Goody's Dash Series results
Year	Team	No.	Make	1	2	3	4	5	6	7	8	9	10	11	12	13	14	15	16	17	18	19	20	21	NGDS	Pts	Ref
1996	Moore Racing	90	Pontiac	DAY	HOM	MYB	SUM	NSV	TRI	CAR	HCY	FLO	BRI	SUM	GRE	SNM	BGS	MYB	LAN	STH	FLO	NWS; 14	VOL	HCY	N/A	0	
1997	Moore Racing	90	Pontiac	DAY	HOM	KIN	MYB	LAN	CAR	TRI	FLO	HCY	BRI	GRE	SNM; 17	CLT; 23	MYB	LAN	SUM	STA; 15	HCY	USA; 5	CON	HOM; 22	31st	637	
1998	Moore Racing	90	Pontiac	DAY; 24	HCY	CAR	CLT	TRI	LAN	BRI	SUM	GRE	ROU	SNM	MYB	CON	HCY	LAN	STA	LOU	VOL	USA	HOM		82nd	91	
1999	Moore Racing	90	Pontiac	DAY; DNQ	HCY; 26	CAR; 27	CLT; 17	BRI; 15	LOU	SUM; 14	GRE; 17	ROU	STA; 17	MYB; 27	HCY; 21	LAN	USA; 32	JAC							20th	1116	
1999	Moore Racing	95	Pontiac																LAN; 15						20th	1116	
2000	Moore Racing	90	Pontiac	DAY; 12	MON				CLT; 15																13th	2047	
2000	Moore Racing	99	Pontiac			STA; 10	JAC; 14	CAR; 10		SBO; 27	ROU; 8	LOU; 10	SUM; 14	GRE; 11	SNM; 11	MYB; 22	BRI; 10	HCY; 10	JAC; 15	USA; 26	LAN; 19				13th	2047	
2001	Moore Racing	7	Pontiac	DAY; 16	ROU; 19	DAR; 15	CLT; 22	LOU; 17	JAC; 18	KEN; 19	SBO; 15	DAY; 15	GRE; 11	SNM; 15	NRV; 19	MYB; 18	BRI	ACE	JAC	USA	NSH				16th	1462	
