= Roger Moser =

American racing driver (born 1947)

- Born: September 20, 1947 (age 79); Auxvasse, Missouri, U.S.

ARCA Menards Series career
- 1 race run over 2 years
- Best finish: 153rd (2004)
- First race: 2004 Kansas Lottery 200 Grand (Kansas)
Wins	Top tens	Poles
0	0	0
- Statistics up to date as of December 23, 2024.

Roger Moser (born September 20, 1947) is an American former professional stock car racing driver who has competed in the NASCAR Goody's Dash Series and the ARCA Re/Max Series.

Moser has also previously competed in the IPOWER Dash Series, the IMCA Florida Winter Nationals, and the DIRTcar Nationals.

== Motorsports results ==
=== NASCAR ===
(key) (Bold - Pole position awarded by qualifying time. Italics - Pole position earned by points standings or practice time. * – Most laps led.)

==== Goody's Dash Series ====
NASCAR Goody's Dash Series results
Year	Team	No.	Make	1	2	3	4	5	6	7	8	9	10	11	12	13	14	15	16	17	18	19	20	21	NGDS	Pts	Ref
1995	N/A	98	Pontiac	DAY	FLO	LAN	MYB	SUM	HCY	CAR	STH	BRI	SUM	GRE	BGS	MYB	NSV	FLO	NWS	VOL	HCY	HOM; 18			N/A	0	
1996	N/A	98	Pontiac	DAY; 24	HOM; 41	MYB	SUM	NSV	TRI	CAR	HCY	FLO	BRI	SUM	GRE	SNM	BGS	MYB	LAN	STH	FLO	NWS	VOL	HCY	N/A	0	
1997	N/A	98	Pontiac	DAY; DNQ	HOM	KIN	MYB	LAN	CAR	TRI	FLO	HCY	BRI	GRE	SNM	CLT; 19	MYB	LAN	SUM	STA	HCY	USA; 33	CON	HOM; 21	53rd	283	
1998	N/A	98	Pontiac	DAY; 22	HCY	CAR	CLT; 40	TRI	LAN	BRI	SUM	GRE; DNQ	ROU	SNM								USA; DNQ	HOM; 22		44th	450	
1998	N/A	8	Pontiac												MYB; 21	CON	HCY	LAN	STA	LOU	VOL				44th	450	
1999	N/A	98	Pontiac	DAY; DNQ	HCY	CAR	CLT	BRI	LOU	SUM	GRE	ROU	STA	MYB	HCY	LAN	USA	JAC	LAN						N/A	0	
2000	N/A	98	Pontiac	DAY; 34	MON	STA	JAC	CAR	CLT; 42	SBO	ROU	LOU	SUM	GRE	SNM	MYB	BRI	HCY	JAC	USA	LAN				69th	98	
2001	N/A	98	Pontiac	DAY; 13	ROU	DAR	CLT; 37	LOU	JAC	KEN	SBO	DAY; 20	GRE	SNM	NRV	MYB	BRI	ACE	JAC	USA	NSH; 8				39th	421	
2002	N/A	98	Pontiac	DAY; 24	HAR	ROU	LON	CLT; 25	KEN	MEM; 16	GRE	SNM	SBO	MYB	BRI	MOT	ATL; DNQ								35th	373	
2003	N/A	98	Pontiac	DAY; 36	OGL; 14	CLT; 28	SBO	GRE	KEN	BRI	ATL														36th	255	

=== ARCA Re/Max Series ===
(key) (Bold – Pole position awarded by qualifying time. Italics – Pole position earned by points standings or practice time. * – Most laps led. ** – All laps led.)

ARCA Re/Max Series results
Year	Team	No.	Make	1	2	3	4	5	6	7	8	9	10	11	12	13	14	15	16	17	18	19	20	21	22	ARMSC	Pts	Ref
2003	Roger Moser	68	Chevy	DAY	ATL	NSH	SLM	TOL	KEN	CLT	BLN	KAN	MCH	LER	POC	POC	NSH	ISF	WIN	DSF	CHI	SLM	TAL	CLT; DNQ	SBO	N/A	0	
2004	Roger Moser	68	Chevy	DAY	NSH	SLM	KEN	TOL	CLT	KAN; 24	POC	MCH	SBO	BLN	KEN	GTW	POC	LER	NSH	ISF	TOL	DSF	CHI	SLM	TAL	153rd	110	
