= Robert Luckadoo =

American racing driver

- Nationality: American
- Born: Ellenboro, North Carolina, U.S.

NASCAR Goody's Dash Series career
- Debut season: 1996
- Years active: 1996–2001
- Starts: 36
- Championships: 0
- Wins: 0
- Poles: 0
- Best finish: 12th in 1997
- Statistics up to date as of October 9, 2025.

Robert Luckadoo (birth date unknown) is an American former professional stock car racing driver who participated in the NASCAR Goody's Dash Series from 1996 to 2003.

== Motorsports results ==
=== NASCAR ===
(key) (Bold – Pole position awarded by qualifying time. Italics – Pole position earned by points standings or practice time. * – Most laps led.)

==== Goody's Dash Series ====
NASCAR Goody's Dash Series results
Year	Team	No.	Make	1	2	3	4	5	6	7	8	9	10	11	12	13	14	15	16	17	18	19	20	21	NGDS	Pts	Ref
1996	N/A	15	Pontiac	DAY	HOM	MYB	SUM	NSV	TRI	CAR	HCY	FLO	BRI	SUM	GRE; 19	SNM	BGS	MYB; 24	LAN; 21	STH	FLO	NWS; 23	VOL	HCY; 25	43rd	479	
1997	N/A	15	Pontiac	DAY; 15	HOM; 9	KIN; 7	MYB; 27	LAN; 26	CAR; 23	TRI; 25	FLO; 17	HCY; 21	BRI; 29	GRE; 8	SNM; 8	CLT; 13	MYB; 16	LAN; 13		STA; 10	HCY; 20	USA; 12	CON; 19	HOM; 13	12th	2407	
1997	N/A	15	Chevy																SUM; 12						12th	2407	
1998	N/A	15	Pontiac	DAY; 35	HCY	CAR	CLT	TRI	LAN	BRI	SUM; 27	GRE; 13	ROU; 22	SNM		CON; 10	HCY; 28	LAN	STA	LOU	VOL	USA	HOM		29th	708	
1998	N/A	45	Pontiac												MYB; 10										29th	708	
1999	N/A	15	Pontiac	DAY	HCY	CAR	CLT	BRI	LOU	SUM	GRE; DNQ	ROU	STA	MYB	HCY	LAN; 20	USA	JAC	LAN						N/A	0	
2000	N/A	15	Pontiac	DAY; DNQ	MON	STA	JAC	CAR	CLT	SBO	ROU	LOU	SUM	GRE	SNM	MYB	BRI	HCY	JAC	USA	LAN				88th	16	
2001	N/A	15	Pontiac	DAY	ROU	DAR	CLT	LOU	JAC	KEN	SBO	DAY	GRE	SNM	NRV; 21	MYB; 24	BRI	ACE	JAC	USA	NSH				62nd	191	
