= Ricky Bryant (racing driver) =

American racing driver (born 1970)

- Nationality: American
- Born: December 5, 1970 (age 55) Archdale, North Carolina, U.S.

NASCAR Goody's Dash Series career
- Debut season: 1996
- Years active: 1996–2000, 2002–2003
- Starts: 85
- Championships: 0
- Wins: 4
- Poles: 5
- Best finish: 2nd in 2000
- Statistics up to date as of December 14, 2024.

Ricky Bryant (born December 5, 1970) is an American former professional stock car racing driver who competed in the NASCAR Goody's Dash Series from 1996 to 2003.

Bryant has previously competed in the ASA National Tour and the ARCA Pro-4 Series.

== Motorsports results ==
=== NASCAR ===
(key) (Bold – Pole position awarded by qualifying time. Italics – Pole position earned by points standings or practice time. * – Most laps led.)

==== Goody's Dash Series ====
NASCAR Goody's Dash Series results
Year	Team	No.	Make	1	2	3	4	5	6	7	8	9	10	11	12	13	14	15	16	17	18	19	20	21	NGDS	Pts	Ref
1996	BG Motorsports	5	Pontiac	DAY; 23	HOM	MYB	SUM	NSV	TRI	CAR	HCY	FLO	BRI; 8	SUM	GRE	SNM; 18	BGS	MYB; 21	LAN	STH	FLO	NWS	VOL	HCY; 12	36th	572	
1997	BG Motorsports	5	Pontiac	DAY; 19	HOM; 23	KIN; 4	MYB; 18	LAN; 6	CAR; 16	TRI; 28	FLO; 8	HCY; 10	BRI; 4	GRE; 7	SNM; 18	CLT; 18	MYB; 11	LAN; 14	SUM; 6	STA; 9	HCY; 15	USA; 4	CON; 17	HOM; 7	8th	2688	
1998	BG Motorsports	5	Pontiac	DAY; 4	HCY; 5	**CAR**; 3	CLT; 11	TRI; 2	LAN; 4	BRI; 16	SUM; 23	GRE; 8	**ROU**; 1	SNM; 13	MYB; 13	CON; 3	HCY; 26	LAN; 9		**LOU**; 2	VOL; 6	USA; 6	HOM; 11		3rd	2867	
1998	BG Motorsports	93	Pontiac																STA; 4						3rd	2867	
1999	BG Motorsports	5	Pontiac	DAY; 13	HCY; 18	CAR; 26	CLT; 10	BRI; 7	LOU; 6	SUM; 10	GRE; 1**	ROU; 1*	STA; 6	MYB; 8	HCY; 8	LAN; 6	USA; 28	JAC; 7	**LAN**; 1**						3rd	2231	
2000	BG Motorsports	5	Pontiac	**DAY**; 28	MON; 4	STA; 3	JAC; 4	CAR; 2	CLT; 6	SBO; 4	ROU; 2	LOU; 5	SUM; 10	GRE; 3	SNM; 7	MYB; 7	BRI; 12	HCY; 8	JAC; 7	USA; 2	LAN; 5				2nd	2700	
2002	N/A	34	Pontiac	DAY	HAR	ROU	LON	CLT	KEN	MEM	GRE	SNM	SBO; 26	MYB	BRI	MOT	ATL								76th	85	
2003	Bryant-Granelli Motorsports	3	Pontiac	DAY; 23	OGL	CLT; 2	SBO	GRE	KEN; 8	BRI; 12	ATL														22nd	533	
