= Ned Combs =

American racing driver (born 1944)

- Nationality: American
- Born: November 16, 1944 (age 81) Newton, North Carolina, U.S.

NASCAR Goody's Dash Series career
- Debut season: 1976
- Years active: 1976–1980, 1982, 1996–2003
- Starts: 180
- Championships: 0
- Wins: 2
- Poles: 0
- Best finish: 3rd in 1978, 1979
- Statistics up to date as of December 20, 2024.

Ned Combs (born November 16, 1944) is an American former professional stock car racing driver who competed in the NASCAR Goody's Dash Series from 1976 to 2003.

Combs has also competed in the IPOWER Dash Series and the ISCARS Dash Touring Series.

== Motorsports results ==
=== NASCAR ===
(key) (Bold – Pole position awarded by qualifying time. Italics – Pole position earned by points standings or practice time. * – Most laps led.)

==== Goody's Dash Series ====
NASCAR Goody's Dash Series results
Year	Team	No.	Make	1	2	3	4	5	6	7	8	9	10	11	12	13	14	15	16	17	18	19	20	21	22	23	NGDS	Pts	Ref
1976	N/A	N/A	Ford	RCH	CAR	ATL	NWS	COL	HCY	BIR	STH	CLT; 6	NWS	LAN	ASH	HCY	CRW	NSV	HCY	RCH	NWS	NWS	CAR	ATL	KIN		N/A	0	
1977	Colson Racing	97	Pontiac	CAR	ATL	NWS	HCY; 14	LAN	DOV	CLT; 5	NWS; 11	CRW; 9	SBO	CRW; 17	HCY	LAN; 8	NSV; 3	STH; 6	CRW; 3	HCY; 15	DAR; 7	NWS; 12	CAR; 9	ATL; 10	NWS; 5	FAY; 4	8th	210	
1978	Colson Racing	97	Pontiac	CAR	ATL	DAR; 7	NWS; 7	DOV; 9																			3rd	2596	
1978	Colson Racing	97	Chevy						BRI; 7	CRW; 8	CRW; 11	HCY; 5	NSV; 6	CRW; 5	LAN; 4	BRI; 3	HCY; 8	DAR; 20	NWS; 17	NWS; 5	CAR; 7	ATL; 31					3rd	2596	
1979	Colson Racing	97	Chevy	DAY; 7	CAR; 7	RCH; 18	ATL; 4			DAR; 6	NSV; 15	CRW; 5	DOV; 8				DAR; 5		DOV; 4	NWS; 3	CAR; 5	ATL; 26					3rd	2738	
1979	Colson Racing	97	Pontiac					NWS; 18	BRI; 4					NSV; 5	HCY; 1			NWS; 2									3rd	2738	
1979	Colson Racing	97	Olds													BRI; 14											3rd	2738	
1980	Combs Racing	97	Chevy	DAY; 2	ATL; 28	NWS; 28		NWS; 3	RCH; 3	DOV; 2	NSV; 2	CRW; 17	GRE; 3	BRI	DAR; 8	NWS; 15		NWS; 7	ATL; 20								4th	2136	
1980	Combs Racing	97	Pontiac				BRI; 26										DOV; 4										4th	2136	
1982	N/A	97	Chevy	DAY; 23	ATL	NWS; 2	CRW	GRE	CRW	DAR	NWS	NWS	CAR	ATL													N/A	0	
1996	N/A	9	Pontiac	DAY; 25	HOM; 35	MYB; 21	SUM; 11	NSV; 24	TRI; 4	CAR; 14		FLO; 10	BRI; 5	SUM; 10	GRE; 11	SNM; 11	BGS; 9	MYB; 11	LAN; 6	STH; 4	FLO; 5	NWS; 27	VOL; 23	HCY; 9			8th	2620	
1996	N/A	9	Chevy								HCY; 8																8th	2620	
1997	N/A	9	Pontiac	DAY; 10	HOM; 14	KIN; 11	MYB; 8	LAN; 11	CAR; 11	TRI; 13	FLO; 5	HCY; 6	BRI; 5	GRE; 24	SNM; 15	CLT; 7	MYB; 6	LAN; 5	SUM; 5	STA; 8	HCY; 14	USA; 29	CON; 8	HOM; 8			7th	2809	
1998	N/A	9	Pontiac	DAY; 31	HCY; 28	CAR; 5	CLT; 5	TRI; 5	LAN; 24	BRI; DNQ	SUM; 25	GRE; 24	ROU; 8	SNM	MYB	CON	HCY; 7	LAN; 10	STA; 10	LOU; 3	VOL						14th	1899	
1998	N/A	9	Ford																			USA; 8	HOM; 23				14th	1899	
1999	N/A	9	Ford	DAY; 18	HCY; 27	CAR; 8	CLT; 14	BRI	LOU; 10	SUM; 9	GRE; 9	ROU; 14	STA; 22	MYB; 30	HCY; 28	LAN; 11	USA; 16	JAC; 5	LAN; 10								13th	1838	
2000	N/A	9	Mercury	DAY; 5	MON; 9	STA; 8	JAC; 12	CAR; 11	CLT; 24	SBO; 14	ROU; 1	LOU; 9	SUM; 13	GRE; 10	SNM; 24	MYB; 11	BRI; 21	HCY; 13	JAC; 9	USA; 9	LAN; 10						9th	2335	
2001	N/A	9	Mercury	DAY; 14	ROU	DAR; 3	CLT; 9	LOU	JAC	KEN; 9	SBO	DAY; 19	GRE	SNM	NRV	MYB	BRI; 12	ACE	JAC	USA; 9	NSH; 21						21st	1033	
2002	N/A	9	Mercury	DAY; 17	HAR	ROU	LON	CLT; 8	KEN; 3	MEM; 15	GRE	SNM	SBO; 7	MYB; 14	BRI; 11	MOT; 12	ATL										17th	1061	
2003	N/A	9	Pontiac	DAY; 12																							12th	913	
2003	N/A	9	Mercury		OGL; 20	CLT; 36	SBO; 11	GRE; 9	KEN; 7	BRI; 29	ATL; 9																12th	913	
