= B. J. Mackey =

American racing driver (born 1978)

- Nationality: American
- Born: December 18, 1978 (age 47) Rock Hill, South Carolina, U.S.

NASCAR Goody's Dash Series career
- Debut season: 1994
- Years active: 1994–2002
- Starts: 113
- Championships: 0
- Wins: 5
- Poles: 3
- Best finish: 3rd in 2000
- Statistics up to date as of December 20, 2024.

B. J. Mackey (born December 18, 1978) is an American professional stock car racing driver who competed in the NASCAR Goody's Dash Series from 1994 to 2002.

Mackey has previously competed in series such as the CARS Late Model Stock Tour, the UARA STARS Late Model Series, the SouthEast Super Trucks Series, and the IPOWER Dash Series.

== Motorsports results ==
=== NASCAR ===
(key) (Bold – Pole position awarded by qualifying time. Italics – Pole position earned by points standings or practice time. * – Most laps led.)

==== Goody's Dash Series ====
NASCAR Goody's Dash Series results
Year	Team	No.	Make	1	2	3	4	5	6	7	8	9	10	11	12	13	14	15	16	17	18	19	20	21	NGDS	Pts	Ref
1994	Mackey Racing	11	Chevy	DAY; 38	VOL; 8	FLO	SUM; 4	CAR; 6	411; 8	HCY; 12	LAN; 19	BRI; 10	SUM; 11	FLO; 19	BGS; 6	MYB; 6	NRV; 5	ASH; 3	VOL; 11	HCY; 11					9th	2126	
1995	Mackey Racing	11	Chevy	DAY; 3	FLO; 4	LAN; 28	MYB; 5	SUM; 7	HCY	CAR; 17	STH	BRI; 2	SUM	GRE; 24	BGS		NSV; 19	FLO; 2	NWS; 13	VOL	HCY; 2	HOM; 14			16th	1903	
1995	Mackey Racing	11	Pontiac													MYB; 10									16th	1903	
1996	Mackey Racing	11	Chevy	DAY; 28	HOM; 7	MYB; 2	SUM; 5	NSV; 11	TRI; 1	CAR; 2							BGS; 6								6th	2822	
1996	Mackey Racing	71	Chevy								HCY; 13	FLO; 4	BRI; 16	SUM; 3	GRE; 8	SNM; 20		MYB; 5	LAN; 8	STH; 11	FLO; 26	NWS; 22	VOL; 17	HCY; 17	6th	2822	
1997	Mackey Racing	71	Pontiac	DAY; 40	HOM	KIN				TRI; 19	FLO; 6	HCY	BRI	GRE	SNM	CLT	MYB; 4	LAN; 2	SUM; 20	STA	HCY; 7	USA; 23	CON; 20		21st	1314	
1997	N/A	12	Pontiac				MYB; 4	LAN	CAR																21st	1314	
1997	N/A	99	Pontiac																					HOM; 28	21st	1314	
1998	Page Racing	71	Pontiac	DAY; 33	HCY; 7	CAR; 4		TRI; 4	LAN; 21	BRI; 12	SUM; 15	GRE; 7	ROU; 5	SNM; 5	MYB; 23	CON; 2	HCY; 3	LAN; 4	STA; 2	LOU; 4	VOL; 10	USA; 5	HOM; 10		4th	2800	
1998	Joyner Racing	4	Pontiac				CLT; 12																		4th	2800	
1999	Joyner Racing	4	Pontiac	DAY; 13	HCY	CAR	CLT	BRI	LOU	SUM	GRE	ROU	STA												27th	768	
1999	N/A	22	Pontiac											MYB; 3	HCY; 1		USA; 29								27th	768	
1999	N/A	28	Ford													LAN; 15									27th	768	
1999	N/A	22	Ford															JAC; 9	LAN						27th	768	
2000	N/A	54	Pontiac	DAY; 9																					3rd	2628	
2000	N/A	84	Pontiac		MON; 2	STA; 17	JAC; 2	CAR; 8	CLT; 39	SBO; 10	ROU; 5	LOU; 3	SUM; 3	GRE; 1	SNM; 1*	MYB; 20	**BRI**; 24	HCY; 4*	**JAC**; 1*	USA; 3	LAN; 2				3rd	2628	
2001	N/A	84	Pontiac	DAY; 5		DAR; 12	CLT	LOU	JAC																29th	701	
2001	Randy Humphrey	33	Pontiac		ROU; 3																				29th	701	
2001	Watson Racing	21	Pontiac							KEN; 8	SBO	DAY	GRE	SNM											29th	701	
2001	N/A	50	Pontiac												NRV; 17	MYB	BRI	ACE	JAC	USA	NSH				29th	701	
2002	N/A	20	Pontiac	DAY; 15	HAR	ROU	LON	CLT; 16	KEN	MEM	GRE	SNM	SBO	MYB	BRI	MOT	ATL								42nd	233	

=== ARCA Re/Max Series ===
(key) (Bold – Pole position awarded by qualifying time. Italics – Pole position earned by points standings or practice time. * – Most laps led. ** – All laps led.)

ARCA Re/Max Series results
Year	Team	No.	Make	1	2	3	4	5	6	7	8	9	10	11	12	13	14	15	16	17	18	19	20	21	22	ARMSC	Pts	Ref
2004	Hixson Motorsports	2	Chevy	DAY	NSH	SLM	KEN	TOL	CLT	KAN	POC	MCH	SBO	BLN	KEN	GTW	POC	LER	NSH	ISF	TOL	DSF	CHI	SLM; DNQ	TAL	N/A	0	

=== CARS Late Model Stock Car Tour ===
(key) (Bold – Pole position awarded by qualifying time. Italics – Pole position earned by points standings or practice time. * – Most laps led. ** – All laps led.)

CARS Late Model Stock Car Tour results
Year	Team	No.	Make	1	2	3	4	5	6	7	8	9	10	11	12	13	CLMSCTC	Pts	Ref
2016	B. J. Mackey	98M	Chevy	SNM	ROU	HCY	TCM	GRE	ROU	CON	MYB; 6	HCY	SNM				37th	27	
2017	B. J. Mackey	98M	Chevy	CON	DOM	DOM	HCY; 4	HCY; 7	BRI	AND	ROU	TCM	ROU	HCY	CON	SBO	25th	55	
