= Gary Moore (racing driver) =

American racing driver (born 1948)

- Nationality: American
- Born: August 31, 1948 (age 78) Horse Shoe, North Carolina, U.S.

NASCAR Goody's Dash Series career
- Debut season: 1979
- Years active: 1979–2003
- Starts: 270
- Championships: 0
- Wins: 0
- Poles: 0
- Best finish: 5th in 1990, 1991, 1992, 1994
- Statistics up to date as of December 22, 2024.

Gary Moore (born August 31, 1948) is an American professional stock car racing driver who competed in the NASCAR Goody's Dash Series from 1979 to 2003.

Moore has also competed in the IPOWER Dash Series, the ISCARS Dash Touring Series, the NASCAR Classic Series, and the NASCAR All-American Challenge Series.

== Motorsports results ==
=== NASCAR ===
(key) (Bold – Pole position awarded by qualifying time. Italics – Pole position earned by points standings or practice time. * – Most laps led.)

==== Goody's Dash Series ====
NASCAR Goody's Dash Series results
Year	Team	No.	Make	1	2	3	4	5	6	7	8	9	10	11	12	13	14	15	16	17	18	19	20	21	NGDS	Pts	Ref
1979	Moore Racing	99	Pontiac	DAY	CAR	RCH	ATL	NWS	BRI	DAR	NSV	CRW	DOV	NSV	HCY	BRI; 6	DAR; 12	NWS	DOV	NWS	CAR	ATL			N/A	0	
1980	Moore Racing	99	Chevy	DAY; 27	ATL; 36	NWS; 7	BRI; 4	NWS; 12	RCH; 6	DOV	NSV; 14	CRW; 9	GRE	BRI	DAR; 13	NWS; 14	DOV	NWS; 13	ATL; 25						7th	1946	
1981	Moore Racing	99	Chevy	DAY; 33	HCY	ATL	BRI; 8	NWS; 11	HCY; N/A^{†}	NWS; 5	TAL; 29	DOV; 21	TWS	STH; 23	GRE; 16	BRI; 10	DAR; 24		NWS; 12	DOV; 21	NWS; 15	CAR; 20	ATL; 16		9th	1934	
1981	Moore Racing	99	Olds															RCH; 21							9th	1934	
1982	Moore Racing	99	Olds	DAY; 50																					16th	935	
1982	Moore Racing	99	Chevy		ATL; N/A^{†}	NWS; 10	CRW; 9	GRE; N/A^{†}	CRW; 6			NWS; 23	CAR; N/A^{†}	ATL; N/A^{†}											16th	935	
1982	N/A	14	Chevy							DAR; 24	NWS														16th	935	
1983	Moore Racing	99	Olds	DAY; 6		NWS; 9	GRE; 24	GRE	GRE; 12	ROU; 16	DAR	ROU	NWS	LON; 5	LON; 6	CAR; 24	ATL								13th	1400	
1983	Moore Racing	99	Chevy		ATL; 9																				13th	1400	
1984	Moore Racing	99	Olds	DAY; 16	NWS; 12	MLW; 13	GRE; 22	NSV; 6	LAN; 8	GRE; 14	BIR	ROU; 9	HCY; 20	DAR; 18	ODS; 13	MAR; 5	NWS; 12								8th	1741	
1985	Moore Racing	99	Olds	DAY	LAN	GRE	CLT	ODS	LAN; 20	BIR	MMS	ROU	SBO	STH	ODS	HCY; 10	CLT								37th	237	
1986	Moore Racing	99	Pontiac	DAY	HCY	LAN	ASH	FCS	ROU	CLT	POC	STH	LAN	SBO	BRI; 8	HCY; 19	SBO	HCY	CLT	NWS					37th	248	
1987	Moore Racing	99	Chevy	DAY	ASH	CLT	STH	NWS	HCY	BRI	SUM	LAN	SBO	LAN; 15	CLT; 25	HCY; 15									30th	327	
1988	Moore Racing	99	Chevy	DAY	ROU	HCY	MYB	CLT; 29	ASH; 2	NSV; 18	SUM	STH; 15	LAN; 17	AND; 4	MYB; 16	LAN; 7	HCY	CLT							17th	1006	
1989	Moore Racing	99	Pontiac	DAY; 13	FLO; 10	NRV; 5	HCY; 9	CON; 4	LAN; 5	SBO; N/A^{†}	NSV; 6	SUM; N/A^{†}	LAN; 7	AND; 10			HCY; 14	LAN; N/A^{†}							7th	2049	
1989	Moore Racing	99	Chevy												BGS; 9	MYB; 10									7th	2049	
1990	Moore Racing	99	Chevy	DAY; 20				FLO; 5		SUM; 18															5th	2290	
1990	Moore Racing	99	Pontiac		NRV; 15	AND; 5	LAN; 12		STH; 14		LAN; 4	BGS; 5	HCY; 3	CON; 3	TRI; 3	MYB; 14	ACE; 7	LAN; 4	HCY; 3						5th	2290	
1991	Moore Racing	99	Pontiac	DAY; 34	FIF; 19	NRV; 4	BGS; 6	FLO; 4	LAN; 16	SUM; 3	STH; 5	LAN; 3		HCY; 3	MYB; 6	ACE; 13	HCY; 8	SHO; 6	NSV; 9						5th	2276	
1991	Moore Racing	99	Chevy										BGS; 2												5th	2276	
1992	Moore Racing	99	Pontiac	DAY; 9		LON; 4	FLO; 5	LAN; 10	SUM; 7	STH; 5	BGS; 17	MYB; 5	NRV; 7	SUM; 5	ACE; 4	HCY; 6	VOL; 8								5th	2063	
1992	Moore Racing	99	Chevy		HCY; 5																				5th	2063	
1993	Moore Racing	99	Chevy	DAY	NSV	SUM	VOL	MAR	LON; N/A^{†}	411	LAN	HCY	SUM; N/A^{†}	FLO; 4	BGS; 6	MYB; 5	NRV; 11	HCY	VOL; 10						19th	859	
1994	Moore Racing	99	Chevy	DAY; 6	VOL; 3	FLO; 5	SUM; 6	CAR; 4	411; 11	HCY; 5	LAN; 5	BRI; 9	SUM; 8	FLO; 22	BGS; 4	MYB; 16	NRV; 8	ASH; 6	VOL; 10	HCY; 10					5th	2432	
1995	Moore Racing	99	Chevy	DAY; 38	FLO; 14	LAN; 9	MYB; 13	SUM; 28	HCY; 6	CAR; 14	STH; 8	BRI; 29	SUM; 12	GRE; 10		MYB; 24		FLO; 13			HCY; 15				12th	2201	
1995	Moore Racing	99	Pontiac												BGS; 6		NSV; 8		NWS; 26			HOM; 8			12th	2201	
1995	Page Racing	40	Chevy																	VOL; 25					12th	2201	
1996	Moore Racing	99	Chevy	DAY; 10	HOM; 5	MYB; 14	SUM; 22	NSV; 28	TRI	CAR				SUM; 11	GRE; 3	SNM; 10		MYB; 13	LAN; 10	STH; 6	FLO; 13	NWS; 20	VOL; 16	HCY; 13	13th	2234	
1996	Moore Racing	99	Nissan								HCY; 28	FLO													13th	2234	
1996	Moore Racing	47	Chevy										BRI; 13												13th	2234	
1996	Moore Racing	99	Pontiac														BGS; 8								13th	2234	
1997	Moore Racing	99	Chevy	DAY; 23																					10th	2474	
1997	Moore Racing	99	Pontiac		HOM; 11		MYB; 11						BRI; 8	GRE; 6			MYB; 30	LAN	SUM; 4	STA; 13	HCY; 10				10th	2474	
1997	N/A	47	Pontiac			KIN; 6																			10th	2474	
1997	N/A	7	Pontiac					LAN; 8	CAR; 4	TRI; 11	FLO; 11	HCY; 9			SNM; 13	CLT; 21					USA; 8	CON; 14	HOM		10th	2474	
1998	Moore Racing	99	Pontiac	DAY; 26			CLT; 28																		15th	1792	
1998	Moore Racing	7	Pontiac		HCY; 12	CAR; 6		TRI; 11	LAN; 19	BRI; 8	SUM; 6	GRE; 15	ROU; 14		MYB; 14	CON; 12	HCY	LAN	STA	LOU	VOL	USA; 14	HOM; 20		15th	1792	
1998	Moore Racing	14	Pontiac											SNM; 17											15th	1792	
1999	Moore Racing	99	Pontiac	DAY; DNQ	HCY	CAR	CLT	BRI; 13	LOU; 13	SUM; 21	GRE	ROU		MYB; 24	HCY; 6	LAN; 29	USA; 15	JAC; 14	LAN						19th	1184	
1999	Moore Racing	14	Pontiac										STA; 8												19th	1184	
2000	Moore Racing	99	Pontiac	DAY; 16	MON; 10	STA	JAC	CAR	CLT																25th	1106	
2000	Moore Racing	7	Pontiac							SBO; 17	ROU			GRE; 16				HCY; 15	JAC; 27	USA	LAN; 18				25th	1106	
2000	Moore Racing	90	Pontiac									LOU; 14	SUM		SNM; 14	MYB	BRI; 28								25th	1106	
2001	N/A	46	N/A	DAY	ROU	DAR	CLT; DNS																		23rd	867	
2001	Roggen Motorsports	4	Pontiac					LOU; 20	JAC																23rd	867	
2001	N/A	97	Pontiac							KEN; 18		DAY; 24	GRE	SNM	NRV	MYB	BRI								23rd	867	
2001	Moore Racing	99	Pontiac								SBO; 22														23rd	867	
2001	N/A	00	Pontiac															ACE; 11	JAC; 17	USA	NSH; 14				23rd	867	
2002	Moore Racing	99	Pontiac	DAY; 27								SNM; 21				MOT; DNQ	ATL								14th	1349	
2002	Moore Racing	00	Pontiac		HAR; 5	ROU; 9	LON; 13	CLT; 22	KEN; 18	MEM; 11	GRE; 15		SBO; 13	MYB	BRI; 22										14th	1349	
2003	Moore Racing	00	Pontiac	DAY; 26	OGL	CLT	SBO; 15	GRE; 19	KEN; 14	BRI; 13	ATL; 14														18th	675	
^{†} - Results/participation unknown
