= Chad Branham =

American racing driver

- Nationality: American
- Born: Ridgeway, South Carolina, U.S.

NASCAR Goody's Dash Series career
- Debut season: 1995
- Years active: 1995–2000
- Starts: 43
- Championships: 0
- Wins: 0
- Poles: 1
- Best finish: 15th in 1999
- Statistics up to date as of January 7, 2025.

Chad Branham (birth date unknown) is an American former professional stock car racing driver who competed in the NASCAR Goody's Dash Series from 1995 to 2000.

== Motorsports results ==
=== NASCAR ===
(key) (Bold – Pole position awarded by qualifying time. Italics – Pole position earned by points standings or practice time. * – Most laps led.)

==== Goody's Dash Series ====
NASCAR Goody's Dash Series results
Year	Team	No.	Make	1	2	3	4	5	6	7	8	9	10	11	12	13	14	15	16	17	18	19	20	21	NGDS	Pts	Ref
1995	Branham Racing	50	Pontiac	DAY	FLO; 20	LAN; 14	MYB; DNQ	SUM; 15	HCY; 17	CAR; 13	STH	BRI; 15	SUM; 18	GRE; 12	BGS	MYB	NSV	FLO	NWS	VOL	HCY	HOM			26th	932	
1996	Branham Racing	50	Pontiac	DAY; DNQ	HOM	MYB; 19	SUM; 14	NSV	TRI	CAR	HCY	FLO; 19	BRI	SUM; 14	GRE; 26	SNM	BGS	MYB; 29	LAN	STH	FLO; 22	NWS; 16	VOL	HCY	24th	910	
1997	Branham Racing	50	Pontiac	DAY; 37	HOM	KIN	MYB	LAN	CAR	TRI	FLO	HCY	BRI	GRE	SNM	CLT	MYB	LAN	SUM	STA	HCY	USA	CON	HOM	93rd	52	
1998	Branham Racing	50	Pontiac	DAY	HCY; 14	CAR	CLT; 22	TRI; 6	LAN; 25	BRI; DNQ	SUM; 10	GRE; 30	ROU	SNM	MYB; 22	CON; 16	HCY; DNQ	LAN	STA	LOU	VOL	USA; 36	HOM; 28		20th	1155	
1999	Branham Racing	50	Pontiac	DAY; 35	HCY; 15	CAR; 6	CLT; 33	BRI	LOU; 8	SUM; 16	GRE; 11	**ROU**; 22	STA; 11	MYB; 4	HCY; 24	LAN; 13	USA; 11	JAC; 12	LAN; 22						15th	1733	
2000	Branham Racing	50	Pontiac	DAY; 29	MON	STA	JAC	CAR	CLT	SBO	ROU	LOU	SUM	GRE	SNM	MYB	BRI	HCY	JAC	USA; DNQ	LAN				76th	76	
