= Ernie Yarborough =

American racing driver

- Nationality: American
- Born: Columbia, South Carolina, U.S.

NASCAR Goody's Dash Series career
- Debut season: 1996
- Years active: 1996–1999
- Starts: 22
- Championships: 0
- Wins: 0
- Poles: 0
- Best finish: 23rd in 1998
- Statistics up to date as of January 8, 2025.

Ernie Yarborough (birth date unknown) is an American former professional stock car racing driver who competed in the NASCAR Goody's Dash Series from 1996 to 1999. He is the nephew of the late three-time NASCAR Cup Series champion Cale Yarborough.

== Motorsports results ==
=== NASCAR ===
(key) (Bold – Pole position awarded by qualifying time. Italics – Pole position earned by points standings or practice time. * – Most laps led.)

==== Goody's Dash Series ====
NASCAR Goody's Dash Series results
Year	Team	No.	Make	1	2	3	4	5	6	7	8	9	10	11	12	13	14	15	16	17	18	19	20	21	NGDS	Pts	Ref
1996	N/A	N/A	N/A	DAY	HOM	MYB	SUM	NSV	TRI	CAR	HCY	FLO; 18	BRI	SUM	GRE; 14	SNM	BGS	MYB	LAN	STH	FLO; 23	NWS	VOL	HCY	50th	324	
1997	Yarborough-Bush Motorsports	93	Ford	DAY; 17	HOM; 27	KIN; 13															HCY; DNQ	USA	CON	HOM	25th	1047	
1997	Yarborough-Bush Motorsports	93	Pontiac				MYB; 20	LAN; 22	CAR	TRI	FLO; 10	HCY	BRI; 27	GRE; 22	SNM	CLT; DNQ	MYB; 25	LAN	SUM	STA					25th	1047	
1998	Speed Tech Racing	22	Ford	DAY; 21	HCY; 9	CAR; 2	CLT; 32	TRI	LAN	BRI; 3	SUM	GRE; 6	ROU	SNM	MYB; 5	CON; 6	HCY	LAN	STA	LOU	VOL	USA	HOM		23rd	1095	
1999	Speed Tech Racing	22	Ford	DAY; 9	HCY	CAR																			N/A	0	
1999	Speed Tech Racing	22	Pontiac				CLT; 39	BRI	LOU	SUM	GRE	ROU	STA	MYB	HCY	LAN	USA	JAC	LAN						N/A	0	
