= Shannon Bryant =

American racing driver

- Nationality: American
- Born: Thomasville, North Carolina, U.S.

NASCAR Goody's Dash Series career
- Debut season: 1999
- Years active: 1999–2000
- Starts: 11
- Championships: 0
- Wins: 0
- Poles: 0
- Best finish: 24th in 1999
- Statistics up to date as of January 7, 2025.

Shannon Bryant (birth date unknown) is an American former professional stock car racing driver who competed in the NASCAR Goody's Dash Series from 1999 to 2000.

== Motorsports results ==
=== NASCAR ===
(key) (Bold – Pole position awarded by qualifying time. Italics – Pole position earned by points standings or practice time. * – Most laps led.)

==== Goody's Dash Series ====
NASCAR Goody's Dash Series results
| Year | Team | No. | Make | 1 | 2 | 3 | 4 | 5 | 6 | 7 | 8 | 9 | 10 | 11 | 12 | 13 | 14 | 15 | 16 | 17 | 18 | NGDS | Pts | Ref |
|---|---|---|---|---|---|---|---|---|---|---|---|---|---|---|---|---|---|---|---|---|---|---|---|---|
| 1999 | N/A | 8 | Pontiac | DAY; 22 | HCY; 24 | CAR; 28 | CLT; 18 | BRI; 5 | LOU | SUM | GRE | ROU | STA | MYB; 12 | HCY; 12 | LAN | USA | JAC | LAN | | | 24th | 882 | |
| 2000 | N/A | 8 | Pontiac | DAY; 30 | MON | STA | JAC | CAR; 13 | CLT | SBO; 11 | ROU; 24 | LOU | SUM | GRE | SNM | MYB | BRI | HCY | JAC | USA | LAN | 35th | 418 | |
