= Tim Nichols (racing driver) =

American racing driver

- Nationality: American
- Born: February 22, 1963 (age 63) Hurley, Virginia, U.S.

NASCAR Goody's Dash Series career
- Debut season: 1998
- Years active: 1998–2002
- Starts: 31
- Championships: 0
- Wins: 0
- Poles: 0
- Best finish: 11th in 2001
- Statistics up to date as of December 26, 2024.

Tim Nichols (born February 22, 1963) is an American former professional stock car racing driver who competed in the NASCAR Goody's Dash Series from 1998 to 2002.

Nichols has previously competed in the NASCAR Advance Auto Parts Weekly Series.

== Motorsports results ==
=== NASCAR ===
(key) (Bold – Pole position awarded by qualifying time. Italics – Pole position earned by points standings or practice time. * – Most laps led.)

==== Goody's Dash Series ====
NASCAR Goody's Dash Series results
Year	Team	No.	Make	1	2	3	4	5	6	7	8	9	10	11	12	13	14	15	16	17	18	19	20	NGDS	Pts	Ref
1998	Dean Combs Racing	11	Ford	DAY	HCY	CAR	CLT	TRI	LAN	BRI	SUM	GRE; 4	ROU	SNM	MYB; 6	CON	HCY	LAN; 2	STA	LOU	VOL	USA; 29	HOM	37th	556	
1999	N/A	26	Pontiac	DAY	HCY	CAR	CLT	BRI	LOU	SUM	GRE; 7	ROU	STA											47th	276	
1999	N/A	11	Mercury											MYB; 11	HCY	LAN	USA	JAC	LAN					47th	276	
2000	N/A	78	Toyota	DAY	MON	STA	JAC	CAR	CLT	SBO	ROU	LOU	SUM	GRE	SNM	MYB; 27								59th	155	
2000	N/A	78	Mercury														BRI; 30	HCY	JAC	USA	LAN			59th	155	
2001	N/A	52	Pontiac	DAY; 3	ROU; 11	DAR; 22	CLT; 33	LOU; 10	JAC; 11	KEN; 25	SBO; 11	DAY; 28	GRE; 9	SNM; 10	NRV; 5	MYB; 11	BRI; 19	ACE; 18	JAC; 9	USA; 12	NSH; 17			11th	2166	
2002	N/A	52	Toyota	DAY; 26			LON; 15																	27th	539	
2002	N/A	52	Pontiac		HAR; 20	ROU; 20		CLT; 12	KEN	MEM	GRE	SNM	SBO	MYB	BRI	MOT	ATL							27th	539	
