= Jimmy Britts =

American racing driver

- Nationality: American
- Born: January 7, 1967 (age 59) Orange Park, Florida, U.S.

NASCAR Goody's Dash Series career
- Debut season: 1998
- Years active: 1998–2001
- Starts: 53
- Championships: 0
- Wins: 3
- Poles: 5
- Best finish: 4th in 1999
- Statistics up to date as of December 27, 2024.

Jimmy Britts (born January 7, 1967) is an American former professional stock car racing driver who competed in the NASCAR Goody's Dash Series from 1998 to 2001.

Britts has previously competed in series such as the NASCAR Southeast Series, the United Speed Alliance Racing Late Model Series, the Florida Pro Series, and the FASCAR Pro Modified Tour.

== Motorsports results ==
=== NASCAR ===
(key) (Bold – Pole position awarded by qualifying time. Italics – Pole position earned by points standings or practice time. * – Most laps led.)

==== Goody's Dash Series ====
NASCAR Goody's Dash Series results
Year	Team	No.	Make	1	2	3	4	5	6	7	8	9	10	11	12	13	14	15	16	17	18	19	20	NGDS	Pts	Ref
1998	Superior Racing	88	Pontiac	DAY	HCY	CAR	CLT	TRI	LAN	BRI	SUM	GRE	ROU	SNM	MYB	CON	HCY	LAN	STA; 23	LOU; 13	VOL	USA; 26	HOM; DNQ	51st	367	
1999	N/A	1	Pontiac	DAY; 5	HCY; 12	CAR; 21		BRI; 28																4th	2203	
1999	N/A	88	Pontiac				CLT; 2		LOU; 17	SUM; 1*	GRE; 15	ROU; 4	STA; 18	MYB; 2	HCY; 4	LAN; 14*	USA; 13	JAC; 1*	LAN; 9					4th	2203	
2000	Excalibur Motorsports	92	Pontiac	DAY; 40		STA; 11	JAC; 13	CAR; 6		**SBO**; 8	ROU; 10	LOU; 21	SUM; 5	**GRE**; 13	SNM; 5	MYB; 5	BRI; 26	**HCY**; 1	JAC; 8	USA; 5	**LAN**; 8			10th	2283	
2000	Excalibur Motorsports	4	Pontiac		MON; 25																			10th	2283	
2000	Excalibur Motorsports	69	Pontiac						CLT; 28															10th	2283	
2001	Excalibur Motorsports	92	Pontiac	DAY; 27	ROU; 23	DAR; 10	CLT; 3	LOU; 14	JAC; 17	KEN; 5	**SBO**; 10	DAY; 25	GRE; 12	SNM; 11	NRV; 7	MYB; 6		ACE; 4	JAC; 20	USA	NSH			13th	2025	
2001	Moore Racing	00	Pontiac														BRI; 13							13th	2025	
