= Charles Powell III =

American racing driver (born 1964)

- Nationality: American
- Born: February 24, 1964 (age 62) Summerville, South Carolina, U.S.

NASCAR Goody's Dash Series career
- Debut season: 1996
- Years active: 1996–1998, 2001
- Starts: 30
- Championships: 0
- Wins: 2
- Poles: 1
- Best finish: 6th in 1997
- Statistics up to date as of December 31, 2024.

Charles Powell III (born February 24, 1964) is an American former professional stock car racing driver who competed in the NASCAR Goody's Dash Series from 1996 to 2001. He is the son of Charlie Powell, who was the track promoter for various tracks in South Carolina.

Powell has also competed in series such as the NASCAR Southeast Series, the NASCAR All-American Challenge Series, the Southern All Star Dirt Racing Series, and the UARA STARS Late Model Series, and is a former track champion at Myrtle Beach Speedway.

== Motorsports results ==
=== NASCAR ===
(key) (Bold – Pole position awarded by qualifying time. Italics – Pole position earned by points standings or practice time. * – Most laps led.)

==== Goody's Dash Series ====
NASCAR Goody's Dash Series results
Year	Team	No.	Make	1	2	3	4	5	6	7	8	9	10	11	12	13	14	15	16	17	18	19	20	21	NGDS	Pts	Ref
1996	N/A	N/A	Pontiac	DAY	HOM	MYB	SUM	NSV	TRI	CAR	HCY	FLO	BRI	SUM	GRE	SNM	BGS	MYB; 1*	LAN	STH	FLO; 24	NWS	VOL	HCY	N/A	0	
1997	N/A	72	Pontiac	DAY; 12	HOM; 5	KIN; 27	MYB; 25	LAN; 10	CAR; 5	TRI; 8	FLO; 7	HCY; 22	BRI; 2	GRE; 1	SNM; 4	CLT; 10	MYB; 3	LAN; 4	SUM; 3	STA; 6	HCY; 19	**USA**; 22	CON; 13	HOM; 20	6th	2840	
1998	N/A	72	Pontiac	DAY; 34	HCY	CAR	CLT	TRI	LAN	BRI	SUM	GRE	ROU	SNM	MYB	CON	HCY	LAN	STA	LOU	VOL	USA	HOM		90th	61	
2001	N/A	50	Pontiac	DAY	ROU	DAR; 8	CLT; 15	LOU	JAC	KEN; 15	SBO	DAY	GRE	SNM	NRV	MYB	BRI	ACE	JAC; 12	USA; 32	NSH; 9				28th	710	
