= Jon Redman =

American stock car racing driver

- Nationality: American
- Born: Fairfax Station, Virginia, U.S.

NASCAR Goody's Dash Series career
- Debut season: 1995
- Years active: 1995–1999
- Starts: 56
- Championships: 0
- Wins: 0
- Poles: 0
- Best finish: 6th in 1998
- Statistics up to date as of January 8, 2025.

Jon Redman (birth date unknown) is an American former professional stock car racing driver who competed in the NASCAR Goody's Dash Series from 1995 to 1999.

== Motorsports results ==
=== NASCAR ===
(key) (Bold – Pole position awarded by qualifying time. Italics – Pole position earned by points standings or practice time. * – Most laps led.)

==== Goody's Dash Series ====
NASCAR Goody's Dash Series results
| Year | Team | No. | Make | 1 | 2 | 3 | 4 | 5 | 6 | 7 | 8 | 9 | 10 | 11 | 12 | 13 | 14 | 15 | 16 | 17 | 18 | 19 | 20 | 21 | NGDS | Pts | Ref |
|---|---|---|---|---|---|---|---|---|---|---|---|---|---|---|---|---|---|---|---|---|---|---|---|---|---|---|---|
| 1995 | N/A | 45 | Chevy | DAY | FLO | LAN | MYB; 16 | SUM; 21 | HCY; 21 | CAR; 21 | STH | BRI | SUM | GRE | BGS | MYB; 16 | NSV; 13 | FLO | NWS; 18 | VOL | HCY; 9 | HOM; 22 | | | 24th | 998 | |
| 1996 | N/A | 45 | Chevy | DAY | HOM; 11 | MYB; 26 | SUM | NSV; 15 | TRI | CAR | HCY; 29 | FLO | BRI; 10 | SUM | GRE | SNM; 15 | BGS | MYB; 12 | LAN; 18 | STH; 8 | FLO | NWS; 9 | VOL; 15 | HCY; 18 | 18th | 1423 | |
| 1997 | N/A | 45 | Chevy | DAY; 24 | | | | | | | | | | | | | | | | | | | | | 16th | 1754 | |
| 1997 | N/A | 45 | Pontiac | | HOM; 17 | KIN; 8 | MYB; 9 | LAN; 15 | CAR; 15 | TRI; 16 | FLO | HCY | BRI; 10 | GRE; 20 | SNM | CLT; 8 | MYB; 21 | LAN; 11 | SUM | STA | HCY; 23 | USA | CON; DNQ | HOM; 6 | 16th | 1754 | |
| 1998 | N/A | 45 | Pontiac | DAY; 11 | HCY; 6 | CAR; 8 | CLT; 14 | TRI; 10 | LAN; 6 | BRI; 7 | SUM; 8 | GRE; 16 | ROU; 6 | SNM; 19 | MYB; 9 | CON; 7 | HCY; 17 | LAN; 19 | STA; 11 | LOU; 7 | VOL; 13 | USA; 15 | HOM; 25 | | 6th | 2594 | |
| 1999 | N/A | 45 | Pontiac | DAY; 42 | HCY | CAR | CLT | BRI | LOU | SUM | GRE | ROU | STA | MYB | HCY | LAN | USA | JAC | LAN | | | | | | N/A | 0 | |
