= Eddie Kelley (racing driver) =

American racing driver

- Nationality: American
- Born: Lakeland, Florida, U.S.

NASCAR Goody's Dash Series career
- Debut season: 1997
- Years active: 1997–2000, 2002
- Starts: 39
- Championships: 0
- Wins: 0
- Poles: 0
- Best finish: 5th in 1999
- Statistics up to date as of December 26, 2024.

Eddie Kelley (birth date 6/17/1964) is an American former professional stock car racing driver who competed in the NASCAR Goody's Dash Series from 1997 to 2002.

Kelley also competed in the NASCAR Advance Auto Parts Weekly Series.

== Motorsports results ==
=== NASCAR ===
(key) (Bold – Pole position awarded by qualifying time. Italics – Pole position earned by points standings or practice time. * – Most laps led.)

==== Goody's Dash Series ====
NASCAR Goody's Dash Series results
Year	Team	No.	Make	1	2	3	4	5	6	7	8	9	10	11	12	13	14	15	16	17	18	19	20	21	NGDS	Pts	Ref
1997	CIMCO Racing	80	Pontiac	DAY	HOM	KIN	MYB	LAN	CAR	TRI	FLO	HCY	BRI	GRE	SNM	CLT	MYB	LAN	SUM	STA	HCY	USA	CON	HOM; 26	84th	85	
1998	CIMCO Racing	80	Pontiac	DAY; 25	HCY; DNQ	CAR; 27	CLT; 34	TRI; 18	LAN; 11	BRI; 29	SUM; 5	GRE; 9	ROU; 18	SNM; 7	MYB; 26	CON; 4	HCY; 25	LAN; 7	STA; 9	LOU; 5	VOL; 4	USA; 21	HOM; 4		10th	2356	
1999	CIMCO Racing	80	Pontiac	DAY; 6	HCY; 25	CAR; 10	CLT; 16	BRI; 6	LOU; 4	SUM; 5	GRE; 4	ROU; 3	STA; 7	MYB; 14	HCY; 18	LAN; 4	USA; 5	JAC; 16	LAN; 23						5th	2177	
2000	N/A	40	Pontiac	DAY; 18	MON	STA	JAC	CAR	CLT; 30	SBO	ROU	LOU	SUM	GRE	SNM	MYB	BRI	HCY	JAC	USA	LAN				52nd	182	
2002	CIMCO Racing	48	Pontiac	DAY; 18	HAR	ROU	LON	CLT	KEN	MEM	GRE	SNM	SBO	MYB	BRI	MOT	ATL								66th	109	
