= Joey Miller (racing driver, born 1971) =

American racing driver

- Nationality: American
- Born: October 6, 1971 (age 55) Wilmington, North Carolina, U.S.

NASCAR Goody's Dash Series career
- Debut season: 198 8
- Years active: 1998–2003
- Starts: 59
- Championships: 0
- Wins: 98
- Poles: 1
- Best finish: 9th in 1999
- Statistics up to date as of December 19, 2024.

Joey Miller (born October 6, 1971) is an American professional stock car racing driver who competed in the NASCAR Goody's Dash Series from 1998 to 2003.

Miller has previously competed in the FASCAR Goodyear Challenge Series, the UARA STARS Late Model Series, and the ISCARS Dash Touring Series.

== Motorsports results ==
=== NASCAR ===
(key) (Bold – Pole position awarded by qualifying time. Italics – Pole position earned by points standings or practice time. * – Most laps led.)

==== Goody's Dash Series ====
NASCAR Goody's Dash Series results
Year	Team	No.	Make	1	2	3	4	5	6	7	8	9	10	11	12	13	14	15	16	17	18	19	20	NGDS	Pts	Ref
1998	Ferguson Enterprises	54	Pontiac	DAY	HCY	CAR	CLT	TRI	LAN	BRI	SUM	GRE	ROU	SNM	MYB; 30	CON	HCY; DNQ	LAN; 22	STA	LOU	VOL	USA	HOM	62nd	228	
1999	N/A	19	Pontiac	DAY	HCY; 8	CAR; 4	CLT	BRI; 3	LOU; 14	SUM; 20	GRE; 6	ROU; 13	STA; 4	MYB; 21	HCY; 7	LAN; 17	USA; 3	JAC; 11	LAN; 3					9th	1939	
2000	N/A	19	Pontiac	DAY; 8	MON; 20	STA; 19	JAC; 9	CAR; 18	CLT; 37	SBO; 19	ROU; 3	LOU	**SUM**; 16	GRE; 14	SNM; 9	MYB; 13	BRI; 22	HCY	JAC; 28	USA; 10	LAN; 6			16th	1879	
2001	N/A	19	Pontiac	DAY; 7	ROU; 26	DAR; 13	CLT; 5	LOU; 4	JAC; 6	KEN; 4	SBO; 14	DAY; 29	GRE; 5	SNM; 13	NRV; 9	MYB; 7	BRI; 21	ACE; 6	JAC; 15	USA; 30	NSH			10th	2181	
2002	N/A	19	Pontiac	DAY; 14	HAR	ROU	LON	CLT	KEN	MEM	GRE	SNM; 5	SBO	MYB	BRI; 6	MOT	ATL							32nd	426	
2003	N/A	19	Pontiac	DAY; 28	OGL; 5	CLT; 22	SBO; 25	GRE; 4	KEN	BRI; 14	ATL; 2													14th	870	
