= Eric Van Cleef =

American racing driver

- Nationality: American
- Born: September 16, 1961 (age 65) Huntsville, Alabama, U.S.

NASCAR Goody's Dash Series career
- Debut season: 1999
- Years active: 1999–2001
- Starts: 38
- Championships: 0
- Wins: 0
- Poles: 0
- Best finish: 12th in 2001
- Statistics up to date as of December 27, 2024.

Eric Van Cleef (born September 16, 1961) is an American former professional auto racing driver who competed in the NASCAR Goody's Dash Series and the Michelin Pilot Challenge.

Van Cleef has previously competed in the IMSA GT Championship and the US Road Racing Championship, and has previously competed in the 24 Hours of Daytona.

== Motorsports results ==
=== NASCAR ===
(key) (Bold – Pole position awarded by qualifying time. Italics – Pole position earned by points standings or practice time. * – Most laps led.)

==== Goody's Dash Series ====
NASCAR Goody's Dash Series results
Year	Team	No.	Make	1	2	3	4	5	6	7	8	9	10	11	12	13	14	15	16	17	18	NGDS	Pts	Ref
1999	N/A	82	Pontiac	DAY; 20	HCY; DNQ	CAR; 11	CLT; 4	BRI; 24	LOU; 20	SUM	GRE	ROU	STA	MYB	HCY	LAN	USA	JAC	LAN			30th	660	
2000	N/A	82	Toyota	DAY; DNQ	MON; 8	STA; 4	JAC; 23	CAR; 22	CLT; 23	SBO; 25	ROU; 17	LOU; 8	SUM; 23	GRE; 8	SNM; 21	MYB	BRI; 7	HCY; 28	JAC	USA; 13	LAN; 17	17th	1712	
2001	N/A	82	Toyota	DAY; 17	ROU; 25	DAR; 7	CLT; 24	LOU; 8	JAC; 9	KEN; 24	SBO; 8	DAY; 32	GRE; 7	SNM; 17	NRV; 11	MYB; 10	BRI; 18	ACE; 13	JAC; 21	USA; 24	NSH; 23	12th	2057	
