= Brandon Head =

American racing driver

- Nationality: American
- Born: Goldsboro, North Carolina, U.S.

NASCAR Goody's Dash Series career
- Debut season: 1998
- Years active: 1998–2000
- Starts: 20
- Championships: 0
- Wins: 0
- Poles: 0
- Best finish: 10th in 1999
- Statistics up to date as of January 6, 2025.

Brandon Head (birth date unknown) is an American professional stock car racing driver who competed in the NASCAR Goody's Dash Series from 1998 to 2000.

Head also competed in the PASS National Championship Super Late Model Series, the UARA STARS Late Model Series, the Mid-Atlantic Street Stock Championship Series Challenger AR Division, and the Western Midget Racing Series, and is former track champion at Southern National Motorsports Park.

== Motorsports results ==
=== NASCAR ===
(key) (Bold – Pole position awarded by qualifying time. Italics – Pole position earned by points standings or practice time. * – Most laps led.)

==== Goody's Dash Series ====
NASCAR Goody's Dash Series results
| Year | Team | No. | Make | 1 | 2 | 3 | 4 | 5 | 6 | 7 | 8 | 9 | 10 | 11 | 12 | 13 | 14 | 15 | 16 | 17 | 18 | 19 | 20 | NGDS | Pts | Ref |
|---|---|---|---|---|---|---|---|---|---|---|---|---|---|---|---|---|---|---|---|---|---|---|---|---|---|---|
| 1998 | N/A | 84 | Pontiac | DAY | HCY | CAR | CLT | TRI | LAN | BRI | SUM | GRE | ROU | SNM | MYB | CON | HCY; 27 | LAN | STA; 12 | LOU | VOL | USA; 28 | HOM; 19 | 47th | 394 | |
| 1999 | N/A | 84 | Pontiac | DAY; 7 | HCY; 10 | CAR; 16 | CLT; 27 | BRI; 2 | LOU; 9 | SUM; 3 | GRE; 28 | ROU; 8 | STA; 13 | | HCY; 19 | LAN; 16 | USA | JAC; 8 | LAN; 7 | | | | | 10th | 1921 | |
| 1999 | N/A | 87 | Pontiac | | | | | | | | | | | MYB; 18 | | | | | | | | | | 10th | 1921 | |
| 2000 | N/A | 84 | Pontiac | DAY; 13 | MON | STA | JAC | CAR | CLT | SBO | ROU | LOU | SUM | GRE | SNM | MYB | BRI | HCY | JAC | USA | LAN | | | 65th | 124 | |
