= 2000 NASCAR Goody's Dash Series =

The 2000 NASCAR Goody's Dash Series was the 26th season of the NASCAR Goody's Dash Series. It began at Daytona International Speedway on February 12 and concluded at Lanier National Speedway on October 28. Robert Huffman, who entered the season as the defending Drivers' Champion, won his fourth championship, 110 points in front of Ricky Bryant.

== Schedule ==
No.	Race title	Track	Date
1	Discount Auto Parts 200 presented by ACDelco Rapidfire	Daytona International Speedway, Daytona Beach, Florida	February 12
2	Montgomery Motor Speedway 125	Montgomery Motor Speedway, Montgomery, Alabama	March 18
3	Gold Star Dodge 125	St. Augustine Speedway, St. Augustine, Florida	April 8
4	Bob King's 125	New River All-American Speedway, Jacksonville, North Carolina	April 22
5	Spero Farms 125	Caraway Speedway, Asheboro, North Carolina	May 13
6	Tom Johnson Camping Center/Easy Care Vehicle Service Contracts 100	Lowe's Motor Speedway, Concord, North Carolina	May 24
7	Goody's Dash 125	South Boston Speedway, South Boston, Virginia	June 9
8	Orange County Speedway 125	Orange County Speedway, Rougemont, North Carolina	June 17
9	Pronto Auto Parts 125	Louisville Motor Speedway, Louisville, Kentucky	June 24
10	SkyFire presented by WCSC TV-5/Bumper to Bumper 100	Summerville Speedway, Summerville, South Carolina	July 1
11	Expression Unlimited, Inc. 100	Greenville-Pickens Speedway, Greenville, South Carolina	July 8
12	Carolina Pre-Cast Concrete 125	Southern National Motorsports Park, Kenly, North Carolina	July 29
13	Van Camp's/Piggly Wiggly Goody's Dash 100	Myrtle Beach Speedway, Myrtle Beach, South Carolina	August 12
14	Pabst Blue Ribbon 150	Bristol Motor Speedway, Bristol, Tennessee	August 23
15	Galaxy Foods & Pure Wesson Cooking Oil present the Jim Cook Chevrolet 125	Hickory Motor Speedway, Hickory, North Carolina	September 16
16	M & N Rentals 125	New River All-American Speedway, Jacksonville, North Carolina	October 7
17	Discount Auto Parts presents the Pennzoil 150	USA International Speedway, Lakeland, Florida	October 21
18	Goody's Dash 150	Lanier National Speedway, Braselton, Georgia	October 28

== Results and standings ==
=== Races ===
No.	Race	Pole position	Most laps led	Winning driver	Manufacturer
1	Discount Auto Parts 200 presented by ACDelco Rapidfire	Ricky Bryant	N/A	Robert Huffman	Pontiac
2	Montgomery Motor Speedway 125	Cam Strader	Cam Strader	Robert Huffman	Pontiac
3	Gold Star Dodge 125	Robert Huffman	Justin Hobgood	Justin Hobgood	Pontiac
4	Bob King's 125	Jake Hobgood	Robert Huffman	Robert Huffman	Pontiac
5	Spero Farms 125	Robert Huffman	Edward Howell	Scott Weaver	Pontiac
6	Tom Johnson Camping Center/Easy Care Vehicle Service Contracts 100	Justin Hobgood	Robert Huffman	Robert Huffman	Pontiac
7	Goody's Dash 125	Jimmy Britts	Cam Strader	Johnny Chapman	Pontiac
8	Orange County Speedway 125	Justin Hobgood	Jake Hobgood	Ned Combs	Mercury
9	Pronto Auto Parts 125	Johnny Chapman	Johnny Chapman	Johnny Chapman	Pontiac
10	SkyFire presented by WCSC TV-5/Bumper to Bumper 100	Joey Miller	Justin Hobgood	Justin Hobgood	Pontiac
11	Expression Unlimited, Inc. 100	Jimmy Britts	B. J. Mackey	B. J. Mackey	Pontiac
12	Carolina Pre-Cast Concrete 125	Cam Strader	B. J. Mackey	B. J. Mackey	Pontiac
13	Van Camp's/Piggly Wiggly Goody's Dash 100	Keith Roggen	Jake Hobgood	Cam Strader	Mercury
14	Pabst Blue Ribbon 150	B. J. Mackey	Cam Strader	Roger Sawyer	Pontiac
15	Galaxy Foods & Pure Wesson Cooking Oil present the Jim Cook Chevrolet 125	Jimmy Britts	B. J. Mackey	Jimmy Britts	Pontiac
16	M & N Rentals 125	B. J. Mackey	B. J. Mackey	B. J. Mackey	Pontiac
17	Discount Auto Parts presents the Pennzoil 150	Scott Weaver	Jake Hobgood	Jake Hobgood	Pontiac
18	Goody's Dash 150	Jimmy Britts	Keith Roggen	Keith Roggen	Pontiac

=== Drivers' championship ===
(key) Bold - Pole position awarded by time. Italics - Pole position set by final practice results or rainout. * – Most laps led.

Pos	Driver	DAY	MON	STA	JAC	CAR	CLT	SBO	ROU	LOU	SUM	GRE	SNM	MYB	BRI	HCY	JAC	USA	LAN	Points
1	Robert Huffman	1	1	**4**	1*	**4**	1*	23	12	6	6	2	2	4	9	2	3	11	7	2810
2	Ricky Bryant	**28**	4	3	4	2	6	4	2	5	10	3	7	7	12	8	7	2	5	2700
3	B. J. Mackey	9	2	17	2	8	39	10	5	3	3	1*	1*	20	**24**	4*	**1***	3	2	2628
4	Roger Sawyer	6	13	6	7	7	21	2	4	4	8	24	17	6	1	3	4	30	11	2509
5	Johnny Chapman	2	5	7	21	28	20	1	11	**1***	2	4	23	8	2	18	5	7	23	2483
6	Keith Roggen	10	15	9	8	9	14	16	6	11	9	9	10	**25**	3	6	16	4	1*	2454
7	Cam Strader	DNQ	**3***	22	5	3	4	3*	16	12	4	5	**3**	1	20*	5	24	25	3	2442
8	Jake Hobgood	33	22	15	**10**	12	19	6	15*	2	7	18	4	2*	18	20	2	1*	15	2349
9	Ned Combs	5	9	8	12	11	24	14	1	9	13	10	24	11	21	13	9	9	10	2335
10	Jimmy Britts	40	25	11	13	6	28	**8**	10	21	5	**13**	5	5	26	**1**	8	5	**8**	2283
11	Justin Hobgood	27	6	1*	27	27	**31**	5	**19**	7	1**	19	6	3	27	19	6	27	4	2234
12	Scott Weaver	20	26	5	24	1	3	7	14	15	20	28	8	23	25	9	23	**22**	14	2120
13	Bobby Dayton	12		10	14	10	15	27	8	10	14	11	11	22	10	10	15	26	19	2047
14	Angie Wilson	11	12	27	15	16	41	13	7	13	12	12	22	18	23	11	12	14		1938
15	Greg Goodell	19	17	28	22	20	27	29	9	16	21	17	12	19	6	17	18	19	20	1933
16	Joey Miller	8	20	19	9	18	37	19	3		**16**	14	9	13	22		28	10	6	1879
17	Eric Van Cleef	DNQ	8	14	23	22	23	25	17	8	23	8	21		7	28		13	17	1712
18	Randy Humphrey	7	21	12	25	23	36	15		19	15	20	15	12		14		15	9	1677
19	Ricky Woodward		14	13	16	24	38	9	18		19	27	13	24	8	16	13	33		1596
20	Doug Gainey		19	20	19	DNQ	32	28	21	20	18	25	19	30		21	22	20	25	1578
21	Mike Watts	17	16	16	18	14	10	21			11	15				22	17	29	13	1533
22	Zach Brewer	32	7	21	11	15	13	12	23					10	14	27		12		1370
23	Danny Bagwell		27	23	3	26	2	20	25					29	11		10	34	24	1356
24	Edward Howell	4	11	2	6	5*	40	26							4			6		1203
25	Gary Moore	16	10					17		14		16	14		28	15	27		18	1106
26	Tommy Ballard		18	DNQ	26			18		18	25			21		26		DNQ		810
27	Steven Barfield				17	17			22			DNQ	18	17		23				709
28	Ernest Winslow	35					29	22	13	17	17	22								676
29	Brent Moore	14					11					7		14				DNQ	12	645
30	Shane Hmiel											6	27	15	5	24				596
31	Doc Brewer	24					9							16	16			18		568
32	Brandon Ward	23					5	24						28	13					543
33	Scott Redmon						12				24	21			15			24		527
34	Mike McConnell			18		DNQ	DNQ									25			16	450
35	Shannon Bryant	30				13		11	24											418
36	William Horton			DNQ		DNQ			20								25		27	416
37	Maxie Bush													9	17	7				396
38	Tony Hargraves			26									16					17		379
39	Trab Crews	31	23		20					22										364
40	Derrick Kelley	22		24														8		330
41	Mark Keeteman					19	7					DNQ						DNQ		328
42	Scott Krehling	26		DNQ			35											23		313
43	Matt Barnes																21	21	22	297
44	Wally Leatherwood						25					DNQ			19					264
45	Larry Caudill						8					23								236
46	Kelly Sutton	DNQ					DNQ							26				16		229
47	Michael Conover												26				11			215
48	Christian Elder	21					17													212
49	Jesse Wade															12		28		206
50	David Hutto	25					18													197
51	Gerald Mintz																14			194
52	Eddie Kelley	18					30													182
53	Alan Buker																19	32		173
54	Mark King	3																		165
55	Junior Miller	DNQ													29					165
56	Charles Terry																		21	164
57	Wayne Edwards																20	35		161
58	George Crenshaw			25														31		158
59	Tim Nichols													27	30					155
60	Mickey York	37				21														152
61	Sonny Yokum	DNQ	24															DNQ		143
62	Scott Thornton																30			140
63	Bryan Gandy	39				25														134
64	Dan Shaver	41					26													125
65	Brandon Head	13																		124
66	Brian Sockwell	15																		118
67	John Michalowski						16													115
68	James Earley												20							103
69	Roger Moser	34					42													98
70	Perry Whisnant						22													97
71	Andy Winstead										22									97
72	Christopher Phipps												25							88
73	David Messer											26								85
74	Chris Elliott																26		26	85
75	Davis Myers																29			76
76	Chad Branham	29																DNQ		76
77	Monty Klein			DNQ																73
78	David Heitzhaus						34													71
79	Mike Gaines	42					DNQ													71
80	Mark Dysart													DNQ						67
81	Barry Fitzgerald						33													64
82	Nolan Wilson	36																		55
83	Greg Harris																	36		55
84	Link Kiser	38																		49
85	Michael Cogdell						DNQ													31
86	Tina Gordon	DNQ																		28
87	Donnie Neuenberger	DNQ																		22
88	Robert Luckadoo	DNQ																		16
Pos	Driver	DAY	MON	STA	JAC	CAR	CLT	SBO	ROU	LOU	SUM	GRE	SNM	MYB	BRI	HCY	JAC	USA	LAN	Points

== See also ==
- 2000 NASCAR Winston Cup Series
- 2000 NASCAR Busch Series
- 2000 NASCAR Craftsman Truck Series
- 2000 ARCA Bondo/Mar-Hyde Series
