= Scott Redmon =

American racing driver

- Nationality: American
- Born: Alexander, North Carolina, U.S.

NASCAR Goody's Dash Series career
- Debut season: 1999
- Years active: 1999–2001
- Starts: 22
- Championships: 0
- Wins: 0
- Poles: 0
- Best finish: 15th in 2001
- Statistics up to date as of December 31, 2024.

Scott Redmon (birth date unknown) is an American former professional stock car racing driver who competed in the NASCAR Goody's Dash Series from 1999 to 2001.

Redmon also competed in the UARA STARS Late Model Series.

== Motorsports results ==
=== NASCAR ===
(key) (Bold – Pole position awarded by qualifying time. Italics – Pole position earned by points standings or practice time. * – Most laps led.)

==== Goody's Dash Series ====
NASCAR Goody's Dash Series results
Year	Team	No.	Make	1	2	3	4	5	6	7	8	9	10	11	12	13	14	15	16	17	18	NGDS	Pts	Ref
1999	Redmon Racing	72	Pontiac	DAY	HCY	CAR; DNQ	CLT	BRI	LOU	SUM	GRE	ROU	STA	MYB	HCY; 23	LAN; 26	USA; 25	JAC	LAN			38th	456	
2000	Moore Racing	99	Pontiac	DAY	MON	STA	JAC	CAR	CLT; 12	SBO	ROU	LOU										33rd	527	
2000	Moore Racing	90	Pontiac										SUM; 24	GRE; 21	SNM	MYB						33rd	527	
2000	Moore Racing	7	Pontiac														BRI; 15	HCY	JAC	USA; 24	LAN	33rd	527	
2001	Moore Racing	99	Pontiac	DAY; 23																		15th	1514	
2001	N/A	27	Pontiac		ROU; 12	DAR; 18	CLT; 25	LOU; 18	JAC; 12	KEN; 14	SBO; 13	DAY; 35	GRE; 14	SNM; 18	NRV; 15	MYB; 16	BRI; 23	ACE	JAC	USA	NSH	15th	1514	
