= Doug Gainey =

American racing driver

- Nationality: American
- Born: July 12, 1957 (age 69) Bunnell, Florida, U.S.

NASCAR Goody's Dash Series career
- Debut season: 1998
- Years active: 1998–2002
- Starts: 32
- Championships: 0
- Wins: 0
- Poles: 0
- Best finish: 18th in 2001
- Statistics up to date as of December 26, 2024.

Doug Gainey (born July 12, 1957) is an American former professional stock car racing driver who competed in the NASCAR Goody's Dash Series from 1998 to 2002.

== Motorsports results ==
=== NASCAR ===
(key) (Bold – Pole position awarded by qualifying time. Italics – Pole position earned by points standings or practice time. * – Most laps led.)

==== Goody's Dash Series ====
NASCAR Goody's Dash Series results
Year	Team	No.	Make	1	2	3	4	5	6	7	8	9	10	11	12	13	14	15	16	17	18	19	20	NGDS	Pts	Ref
1998	N/A	09	Pontiac	DAY	HCY	CAR	CLT	TRI	LAN; 26	BRI	SUM	GRE	ROU	SNM	MYB	CON	HCY	LAN	STA; 20	LOU	VOL	USA; DNQ	HOM; 29	58th	316	
1999	N/A	09	Pontiac	DAY; DNQ	HCY	CAR	CLT	BRI	LOU	SUM	GRE	ROU	STA; 16	MYB	HCY	LAN	USA	JAC	LAN; 18					44th	308	
2000	N/A	09	Pontiac	DAY	MON; 19	STA; 20	JAC; 19	CAR; DNQ	CLT; 32	SBO; 28	ROU; 21	LOU; 20	SUM; 18	GRE; 25	SNM; 19			HCY; 21	JAC; 22	USA; 20	LAN; 25			20th	1578	
2000	N/A	7	Pontiac													MYB; 30	BRI							20th	1578	
2001	N/A	09	Pontiac	DAY; DNQ	ROU; 16	DAR; 17	CLT; 26	LOU; 13	JAC; 15	KEN; 17	SBO; 19	DAY; 22	GRE; 19	SNM	NRV	MYB; 21	BRI	ACE	JAC	USA	NSH; 16			18th	1209	
2002	N/A	09	Pontiac	DAY; 35	HAR	ROU	LON	CLT	KEN	MEM	GRE	SNM	SBO	MYB	BRI	MOT	ATL							84th	58	
