= Keith Roggen =

American racing driver (born 1979)

- Nationality: American
- Born: December 19, 1979 (age 46) Winter Haven, Florida, U.S.

NASCAR Goody's Dash Series career
- Debut season: 1997
- Years active: 1997–2003
- Starts: 48
- Championships: 0
- Wins: 1
- Poles: 1
- Best finish: 6th in 2000
- Statistics up to date as of December 20, 2024.

Keith Roggen (born December 19, 1979) is an American professional stock car racing driver who competed in the NASCAR Goody's Dash Series from 1997 to 2003.

Roggen has previously competed in the X-1R Pro Cup Series, the Sunshine State Challenge Series, the Wheel Man Sportsman Series, and the UARA National Late Model Series.

== Motorsports results ==
=== NASCAR ===
(key) (Bold – Pole position awarded by qualifying time. Italics – Pole position earned by points standings or practice time. * – Most laps led.)

==== Goody's Dash Series ====
NASCAR Goody's Dash Series results
Year	Team	No.	Make	1	2	3	4	5	6	7	8	9	10	11	12	13	14	15	16	17	18	19	20	21	NGDS	Pts	Ref
1997	Roggen Motorsports	94	Pontiac	DAY	HOM	KIN	MYB	LAN	CAR	TRI	FLO	HCY	BRI	GRE	SNM	CLT	MYB	LAN	SUM	STA	HCY	USA; 21	CON	HOM	81st	100	
1998	Roggen Motorsports	94	Pontiac	DAY	HCY	CAR	CLT	TRI	LAN	BRI	SUM	GRE	ROU	SNM	MYB	CON	HCY	LAN	STA; 26	LOU	VOL; 9	USA; 10	HOM; 21		42nd	457	
1999	Roggen Motorsports	94	Pontiac	DAY; DNQ	HCY; 7	CAR; DNQ	CLT; 26	BRI; 9	LOU; 5	SUM; 13	GRE; 20	ROU; 10	STA; 20	MYB; 13	HCY; 14	LAN; 23	USA; 6	JAC; 10	LAN						16th	1681	
2000	Roggen Motorsports	94	Pontiac	DAY; 10	MON; 15		JAC; 8				ROU; 6						BRI; 3	HCY; 6	JAC; 16	USA; 4	LAN; 1*				6th	2454	
2000	Roggen Motorsports	94	Chevy			STA; 9		CAR; 9	CLT; 14	SBO; 16		LOU; 11	SUM; 9	GRE; 9	SNM; 10	**MYB**; 25									6th	2454	
2001	Roggen Motorsports	94	Pontiac	DAY; 39			CLT; 17										BRI; 27	ACE	JAC						27th	719	
2001	Roggen Motorsports	94	Chevy		ROU; 22	DAR		LOU; 16	JAC	KEN	SBO	DAY	GRE	SNM	NRV	MYB; 17				USA; 5	NSH				27th	719	
2002	Roggen Motorsports	94	Pontiac	DAY; 40	HAR	ROU; 24	LON	CLT	KEN	MEM	GRE	SNM	SBO	MYB; 20											34th	407	
2002	Roggen Motorsports	94	Chevy												BRI; 2	MOT	ATL								34th	407	
2003	Roggen Motorsports	94	Pontiac	DAY	OGL	CLT	SBO	GRE	KEN	BRI; 5	ATL														48th	155	
