= 1999 NASCAR Goody's Dash Series =

The 1999 NASCAR Goody's Dash Series was the 25th season of the NASCAR Goody's Dash Series. It began at Daytona International Speedway on February 12 and concluded at Langley Speedway on October 16. Robert Huffman, who entered the season as the defending Drivers' Champion, won his third championship, 299 points in front of Jake Hobgood.

== Schedule ==
| No. | Race title | Track | Date |
|---|---|---|---|
| 1 | Discount Auto Parts 200 | Daytona International Speedway, Daytona Beach, Florida | February 12 |
| 2 | Hickory 100 | Hickory Motor Speedway, Hickory, North Carolina | April 24 |
| 3 | Caraway Speedway 125 | Caraway Speedway, Asheboro, North Carolina | May 8 |
| 4 | Tom Johnson/EasyCare 100 | Lowe's Motor Speedway, Concord, North Carolina | May 26 |
| 5 | Bristol Motor Speedway 150 | Bristol Motor Speedway, Bristol, Tennessee | June 4 |
| 6 | Winston Fan Appreciation 125 | Louisville Motor Speedway, Louisville, Kentucky | June 19 |
| 7 | Post & Courier/TV-5 100 | Summerville Speedway, Summerville, South Carolina | July 3 |
| 8 | Expressions Unlimited 100 | Greenville-Pickens Speedway, Greenville, South Carolina | July 10 |
| 9 | Surge 125 | Orange County Speedway, Rougemont, North Carolina | July 17 |
| 10 | Gold Star Dodge Dealers 100 | St. Augustine Speedway, St. Augustine, Florida | July 24 |
| 11 | WPDE-TV 16 100 | Myrtle Beach Speedway, Myrtle Beach, South Carolina | August 7 |
| 12 | Galaxy Foods 125 | Hickory Motor Speedway, Hickory, North Carolina | August 21 |
| 13 | Carolina Turkey 150 | Lanier National Speedway, Braselton, Georgia | September 18 |
| 14 | Pennzoil 150 | USA International Speedway, Lakeland, Florida | October 2 |
| 15 | Goody's Dash Series 125 | New River All-American Speedway, Jacksonville, North Carolina | October 9 |
| 16 | Denbigh Construction 100 | Langley Speedway, Hampton, Virginia | October 16 |

== Results and standings ==
=== Races ===
| No. | Race | Pole position | Most laps led | Winning driver | Manufacturer |
|---|---|---|---|---|---|
| 1 | Discount Auto Parts 200 | Scott Weaver | Christian Elder | Christian Elder | Pontiac |
| 2 | Hickory 100 | Terry Brooks | Edward Howell | Robert Huffman | Pontiac |
| 3 | Caraway Speedway 125 | Robert Huffman | Robert Huffman | Robert Huffman | Pontiac |
| 4 | Tom Johnson/EasyCare 100 | Robert Huffman | Robert Huffman | Robert Huffman | Pontiac |
| 5 | Bristol Motor Speedway 150 | N/A | Robert Huffman | Zach Brewer | Pontiac |
| 6 | Winston Fan Appreciation 125 | Robert Huffman | Robert Huffman | Robert Huffman | Pontiac |
| 7 | Post & Courier/TV-5 100 | N/A | Jimmy Britts | Jimmy Britts | Pontiac |
| 8 | Expressions Unlimited 100 | Jake Hobgood | Ricky Bryant | Ricky Bryant | Pontiac |
| 9 | Surge 125 | Chad Branham | Ricky Bryant | Ricky Bryant | Pontiac |
| 10 | Gold Star Dodge Dealers 100 | Robert Huffman | Robert Huffman | Robert Huffman | Pontiac |
| 11 | WPDE-TV 16 100 | N/A | Robert Huffman | Robert Huffman | Pontiac |
| 12 | Galaxy Foods 125 | Robert Huffman | Robert Huffman | B. J. Mackey | Pontiac |
| 13 | Carolina Turkey 150 | Robert Huffman | Jimmy Britts | Jake Hobgood | Pontiac |
| 14 | Pennzoil 150 | Robert Huffman | Robert Huffman | Robert Huffman | Pontiac |
| 15 | Goody's Dash Series 125 | Justin Hobgood | Jimmy Britts | Jimmy Britts | Pontiac |
| 16 | Denbigh Construction 100 | Ricky Bryant | Ricky Bryant | Ricky Bryant | Pontiac |

=== Drivers' championship ===
(key) Bold - Pole position awarded by time. Italics - Pole position set by final practice results or rainout. * – Most laps led.

| Pos | Driver | DAY | HCY | CAR | CLT | BRI | LOU | SUM | GRE | ROU | STA | MYB | HCY | LAN | USA | JAC | LAN | Points |
|---|---|---|---|---|---|---|---|---|---|---|---|---|---|---|---|---|---|---|
| 1 | Robert Huffman | 2 | 1 | **1**** | **1*** | 4* | **1**** | 7 | 2 | 17 | **1**** | 1** | **2*** | **9** | **1*** | 3 | 24 | 2582 |
| 2 | Jake Hobgood | 12 | 6 | 3 | 32 | 23 | 2 | 2 | **3** | 2 | 3 | 7 | 20 | 1 | 9 | 20 | 2 | 2283 |
| 3 | Ricky Bryant | 13 | 18 | 26 | 10 | 7 | 6 | 10 | 1** | 1* | 6 | 8 | 8 | 6 | 28 | 7 | **1*** | 2231 |
| 4 | Jimmy Britts | 5 | 12 | 21 | 2 | 28 | 17 | 1* | 15 | 4 | 18 | 2 | 4 | 14* | 13 | 1* | 9 | 2203 |
| 5 | Eddie Kelley | 6 | 25 | 10 | 16 | 6 | 4 | 5 | 4 | 3 | 7 | 14 | 18 | 4 | 5 | 16 | 23 | 2177 |
| 6 | Zach Brewer | 25 | 14 | 17 | 13 | 1 | 15 | 4 | 26 | 6 | 2 | 9 | 27 | 2 | 7 | 4 | 8 | 2142 |
| 7 | Roger Sawyer | 19 | 11 | 20 | 7 | 11 | 7 | 12 | 8 | 11 | 19 | 10 | 5 | 7 | 12 | 17 | 5 | 2095 |
| 8 | Justin Hobgood | 28 | DNQ | 7 | 23 | 21 | 3 | 8 | 25 | 5 | 10 | 29 | 9 | 5 | 2 | **2** | 12 | 2006 |
| 9 | Joey Miller | | 8 | 4 | | 3 | 14 | 20 | 6 | 13 | 4 | 21 | 7 | 17 | 3 | 11 | 3 | 1939 |
| 10 | Brandon Head | 7 | 10 | 16 | 27 | 2 | 9 | 3 | 28 | 8 | 13 | 18 | 19 | 16 | | 8 | 7 | 1921 |
| 11 | Randy Humphrey | 17 | 17 | 18 | 11 | 10 | 12 | 11 | 21 | 19 | 14 | 25 | 13 | 10 | 27 | 15 | 11 | 1857 |
| 12 | Angie Wilson | 32 | 4 | 13 | 34 | 22 | 19 | 17 | 16 | 23 | 12 | 5 | 3 | 19 | 18 | 13 | 14 | 1843 |
| 13 | Ned Combs | 18 | 27 | 8 | 14 | | 10 | 9 | 9 | 14 | 22 | 30 | 28 | 11 | 16 | 5 | 10 | 1838 |
| 14 | Brent Moore | 31 | 13 | 14 | 6 | 25 | 11 | 15 | 14 | 16 | 15 | 15 | 16 | 18 | 19 | 26 | 16 | 1803 |
| 15 | Chad Branham | 35 | 15 | 6 | 33 | | 8 | 16 | 11 | **22** | 11 | 4 | 24 | 13 | 11 | 12 | 22 | 1733 |
| 16 | Keith Roggen | DNQ | 7 | DNQ | 26 | 9 | 5 | 13 | 20 | 10 | 20 | 13 | 14 | 23 | 6 | 10 | | 1681 |
| 17 | Jimmy Gross | 8 | 16 | 24 | 19 | 18 | 18 | 18 | | 21 | | 16 | 10 | 12 | 22 | 24 | 13 | 1569 |
| 18 | David Hutto | 10 | 5 | 5 | 25 | | 21 | 6 | DNQ | 7 | | 6 | 22 | | | | | 1288 |
| 19 | Gary Moore | DNQ | | | | 13 | 13 | 21 | | | 8 | 24 | 6 | 29 | 15 | 14 | | 1184 |
| 20 | Bobby Dayton | DNQ | 26 | 27 | 17 | 15 | | 14 | 17 | | 17 | 27 | 21 | | 32 | | 15 | 1116 |
| 21 | Greg Goodell | 4 | DNQ | 23 | 31 | 17 | | | 18 | 15 | | DNQ | 17 | 21 | 26 | | | 1085 |
| 22 | Donnie Neuenberger | DNQ | 9 | 9 | 36 | 29 | 16 | 23 | 19 | 12 | | 23 | | | | | | 940 |
| 23 | Johnny Chapman | | 3 | 2 | 3 | 20 | | | | | | | 25 | 3 | | | | 896 |
| 24 | Shannon Bryant | 22 | 24 | 28 | 18 | 5 | | | | | | 12 | 12 | | | | | 882 |
| 25 | Mickey York | 41 | 28 | 15 | 15 | 14 | | | | 9 | | DNQ | | | 10 | | | 818 |
| 26 | Edward Howell | | 2* | 19 | 30 | | | | 5 | | 5 | | | | 14 | | | 780 |
| 27 | B. J. Mackey | 24 | | | | | | | | | | 3 | 1 | 15 | 29 | 9 | | 768 |
| 28 | Danny Snell | 38 | | | | 12 | | 19 | 22 | | 23 | 22 | | | | | | 701 |
| 29 | Terry Brooks | 30 | **19** | 12 | 28 | 8 | | | 10 | | | | | | | | | 661 |
| 30 | Eric Van Cleef | 20 | DNQ | 11 | 4 | 24 | 20 | | | | | | | | | | | 660 |
| 31 | Mike Watts | 34 | 21 | DNQ | 8 | 26 | | | | | | | | 22 | | | | 634 |
| 32 | Link Kiser | | | | | | | | | | | DNQ | 26 | 24 | 21 | 6 | 4 | 586 |
| 33 | Danny Bagwell | 16 | | | 5 | | | | | | | | | | 4 | 25 | | 573 |
| 34 | Doc Brewer | 14 | | | 12 | 16 | | | | | | 28 | | | 30 | | | 515 |
| 35 | Steven Barfield | | | DNQ | | | | | 12 | 18 | | 19 | | | | 18 | | 512 |
| 36 | Wally Leatherwood | 15 | | | 9 | 27 | | | 29 | | | | | 25 | | | | 502 |
| 37 | Mike McConnell | DNQ | | | | | | | 23 | | | 17 | 15 | 8 | | | | 467 |
| 38 | Scott Redmon | | | DNQ | | | | | | | | | 23 | 26 | 25 | | | 456 |
| 39 | Charlie Smith | | DNQ | 25 | | | | | | | | | 11 | 30 | | 23 | | 455 |
| 40 | Trab Crews | 33 | | | 35 | | | | | | | | | 28 | 20 | | | 423 |
| 41 | Scott Weaver | **36** | | | | | | | | | | | | | 17 | 21 | 6 | 417 |
| 42 | Chris Elliott | | 23 | | | | | | | 20 | | | | | | 19 | | 379 |
| 43 | James Trout | | | | | | | | | | 25 | | | 27 | | | | 335 |
| 44 | Doug Gainey | DNQ | | | | | | | | | 16 | | | | | | 18 | 308 |
| 45 | Rusty Wise | 37 | 20 | DNQ | 29 | | | | | | | | | | | | | 301 |
| 46 | Davis Myers | 40 | | | 22 | | | | 30 | | | | | | | | | 280 |
| 47 | Tim Nichols | | | | | | | | 7 | | | 11 | | | | | | 276 |
| 48 | Robert Drawdy | | | | | | | 22 | | | | 20 | | | | | | 270 |
| 49 | Shane Hmiel | | 22 | 22 | | | | | | | | | | | | | | 261 |
| 50 | Derrick Kelley | 26 | | | | | | | | | | | | | 8 | | | 235 |
| 51 | Scott Krehling | 27 | | | 41 | | | | | | | | | | 33 | | | 0 |
| 52 | Billy Joyner | DNQ | | | 40 | | | | | | 21 | | | | 36 | | | 0 |
| 53 | Doyle Boatwright | | | | | | | | | | 9 | | | | 31 | | | 0 |
| 54 | Joe Buford | 3 | | | 42 | | | | | | | | | | | | | 0 |
| 55 | George Crenshaw | 39 | | | | | | | | | | | | | 34 | | | 0 |
| 56 | Tim Hayes | | | | | | | | 27 | | 24 | | | | | | | 0 |
| 57 | David Heitzhaus | 21 | | | 37 | | | | | | | | | | | | | 0 |
| 58 | Danny Mathis | DNQ | | | 20 | 30 | | | | | | | | | | | | 0 |
| 59 | Ernie Yarborough | 9 | | | 39 | | | | | | | | | | | | | 0 |
| 60 | Mark Ahlbrandt | | | | | | | | | | 26 | | | | | | | 0 |
| 61 | Steve Barnes | DNQ | | | | | | | | | | | | | | | 17 | 0 |
| 62 | Larry Caudill | DNQ | | | | | | | | | | | | | | | 19 | 0 |
| 63 | Stephen Durham | | | | | | | | | | | | | | | | 25 | 0 |
| 64 | Christian Elder | 1* | | | | | | | | | | | | | | | | 0 |
| 65 | Keith Fricke | | | | | | | | | | | | | | | 22 | | 0 |
| 66 | Tony Hargraves | | | | | | | | | | | | | | 23 | | | 0 |
| 67 | Bill Hennecy | 11 | | | | | | | | | | | | | | | | 0 |
| 68 | Mark King | | | | | | | | 24 | | | | | | | | | 0 |
| 69 | Monty Klein | | | | | | | | | | | 26 | | | | | | 0 |
| 70 | David Logan | | | | | | | | | | | | | | | | 20 | 0 |
| 71 | Robert Luckadoo | | | | | | | | DNQ | | | | | 20 | | | | 0 |
| 72 | Junior Miller | DNQ | | | | 19 | | | | | | | | | | | | 0 |
| 73 | Jon Redman | 42 | | | | | | | | | | | | | | | | 0 |
| 74 | J. R. Robbs | | | | | | | | 13 | | | | | | | | | 0 |
| 75 | Eric Rogers | DNQ | | | 24 | | | | | | | | | | | | | 0 |
| 76 | Mike Swaim Jr. | 23 | | | | | | | | | | | | | | | | 0 |
| 77 | Bryan Weil | | | | 38 | | | | | | | | | | | | | 0 |
| 78 | Perry Whisnant | | | | 24 | | | | | | | | | | | | | 0 |
| 79 | Andy Whinstead | | | | | | | | | | | | | | | | 21 | 0 |
| 80 | Ricky Woodward | | | | | | | | | | | | | | 24 | | | 0 |
| 81 | Sonny Yokum | | | | | | | | | | | | | | 35 | | | 0 |
| 82 | Roger Best | DNQ | | | | | | | | | | | | | | | | 0 |
| 83 | Mark Dysart | DNQ | | DNQ | | | | | | | | | | | | | | 0 |
| 84 | Robert Forsythe | | DNQ | | | | | | | | | | | | | | | 0 |
| 85 | A. J. Frank | DNQ | | | | | | | | | | | | | | | | 0 |
| 86 | Mike Gaines | DNQ | | | | | | | | | | | | | | | | 0 |
| 87 | Roger Moser | DNQ | | | | | | | | | | | | | | | | 0 |
| 88 | Bryan Nance | DNQ | | | | | | | | | | | | | | | | 0 |
| 89 | David Probst | DNQ | | | | | | | | | | | | | | | | 0 |
| 90 | Keith Wilson | DNQ | | | | | | | | | | | | | | | | 0 |
| 91 | Jerry Lee Yarbrough | DNQ | | | | | | | | | | | | | | | | 0 |
| Pos | Driver | DAY | HCY | CAR | CLT | BRI | LOU | SUM | GRE | ROU | STA | MYB | HCY | LAN | USA | JAC | LAN | Points |

== See also ==
- 1999 NASCAR Winston Cup Series
- 1999 NASCAR Busch Series
- 1999 NASCAR Craftsman Truck Series
- 1999 NASCAR Winston West Series
- 1999 ARCA Bondo/Mar-Hyde Series
