= 1997 NASCAR Goody's Dash Series =

The 1997 NASCAR Goody's Dash Series was the 23rd season of the NASCAR Goody's Dash Series. It began at Daytona International Speedway on February 14 and concluded at Homestead-Miami Speedway on November 9. Lyndon Amick entered the season as the defending Drivers' Champion, Mike Swaim Jr. won his first and only championship, 138 points in front of Brian Sockwell.

== Schedule ==
No.	Race title	Track	Date
1	Discount Auto Parts 200	Daytona International Speedway, Daytona Beach, Florida	February 14
2	Pennzoil 150	Homestead-Miami Speedway, Homestead, Florida	March 15
3	Fairway Ford 125	Kingsport Speedway, Kingsport, Tennessee	April 11
4	Myrtle Beach 100	Myrtle Beach Speedway, Myrtle Beach, South Carolina	April 19
5	American General Finance 100	Lanier National Speedway, Braselton, Georgia	May 3
6	Yadkin Valley Chevrolet-Geo/Brigman Clinic 125	Caraway Speedway, Asheboro, North Carolina	May 10
7	Ekamant Coated Abrasives 125	Tri-County Motor Speedway, Hudson, North Carolina	May 23
8	Primestar 100	Florence Motor Speedway, Timmonsville, South Carolina	May 30
9	Elmer Killan Memorial 100	Hickory Motor Speedway, Hickory, North Carolina	June 7
10	Goody's Dash 150	Bristol Motor Speedway, Bristol, Tennessee	June 20
11	Budweiser 100	Greenville-Pickens Speedway, Greenville, South Carolina	July 12
12	American General Finance 125	Southern National Motorsports Park, Kenly, North Carolina	July 19
13	Charlotte 100	Lowe's Motor Speedway, Concord, North Carolina	July 24
14	Myrtle Beach 100	Myrtle Beach Speedway, Myrtle Beach, South Carolina	August 9
15	Cook's Moving Service 100	Langley Speedway, Hampton, Virginia	August 16
16	American Residential Services 100	Summerville Speedway, Summerville, South Carolina	August 30
17	Gold Star Dodge Dealers 100	St. Augustine Speedway, St. Augustine, Florida	September 6
18	American General Finance 100	Hickory Motor Speedway, Hickory, North Carolina	September 20
19	Discount Auto Parts/Quaker State 150	USA International Speedway, Lakeland, Florida	October 4
20	American General Finance 200	Concord Speedway, Concord, North Carolina	November 2
21	Homestead 50	Homestead-Miami Speedway, Homestead, Florida	November 9

== Results and standings ==
=== Races ===
No.	Race	Pole position	Most laps led	Winning driver	Manufacturer
1	Discount Auto Parts 200	Mike Swaim Jr.	N/A	Brian Sockwell	Pontiac
2	Pennzoil 150	Robert Huffman	Robert Huffman; Will Hobgood (Note: Huffman and Hobgood both led 30 laps.)	Robert Huffman	Pontiac
3	Fairway Ford 125	Mike Swaim Jr.	N/A	Will Hobgood	Pontiac
4	Myrtle Beach 100	Brian Sockwell	Will Hobgood	Will Hobgood	Pontiac
5	American General Finance 100	Monk Gulledge	Robert Huffman	Mike Swaim Jr.	Pontiac
6	Yadkin Valley Chevrolet-Geo/Brigman Clinic 125	Mike Swaim Jr.	Mike Swaim Jr.	Mike Swaim Jr.	Pontiac
7	Ekamant Coated Abrasives 125	Mike Swaim Jr.	Mike Swaim Jr.	Mike Swaim Jr.	Pontiac
8	Primestar 100	Will Hobgood	Will Hobgood	Mike Swaim Jr.	Pontiac
9	Elmer Killan Memorial 100	Robert Huffman	Robert Huffman	Robert Huffman	Pontiac
10	Goody's Dash 150	Christian Elder	Mike Swaim Jr.	Brian Sockwell	Pontiac
11	Budweiser 100	Scott Weaver	Will Hobgood	Charles Powell III	Pontiac
12	American General Finance 125	Brian Sockwell	Scott Weaver	Scott Weaver	Pontiac
13	Charlotte 100	Mike Swaim Jr.	Christian Elder	Christian Elder	Pontiac
14	Myrtle Beach 100	Brian Sockwell	Brian Sockwell	Brian Sockwell	Pontiac
15	Cook's Moving Service 100	Brian Sockwell	Brian Sockwell	Brian Sockwell	Pontiac
16	American Residential Services 100	Mike Swaim Jr.	Brian Sockwell	Brian Sockwell	Pontiac
17	Gold Star Dodge Dealers 100	Brian Sockwell	David Hutto	Robert Huffman	Pontiac
18	American General Finance 100	David Hutto	David Hutto	David Hutto	Chevrolet
19	Discount Auto Parts/Quaker State 150	Charles Powell III	David Hutto	David Hutto	Chevrolet
20	American General Finance 200	Danny Bagwell	Will Hobgood	David Hutto	Chevrolet
21	Homestead 50	Billy Bigley Jr.	Danny Bagwell	Danny Bagwell	Ford

=== Drivers' championship ===
(key) Bold - Pole position awarded by time. Italics - Pole position set by final practice results or rainout. * – Most laps led.

Pos	Driver	DAY	HOM	KIN	MYB	LAN	CAR	TRI	FLO	HCY	BRI	GRE	SNM	CLT	MYB	LAN	SUM	STA	HCY	USA	CON	HOM	Points
1	Mike Swaim Jr.	**5**	16	**3**	15	1	**1***	**1***	1	2	6	10	3	**2**	2	7	**11**	5	2	3	4	10	3292
2	Brian Sockwell	1	19	24	**7**	7	9	3	22	4	1	4	**6**	4	**1****	**1***	1*	**3**	3	31	3	2	3154
3	Will Hobgood	32	12*	1	1*	2	6	2	**2***	18	9	14	2	3	15	3	8	4	4	14	2*	5	3108
4	Robert Huffman	4	**1***	16	2	9*	18	23	23	**1****	15	2	7	9	13	8	2	1	21	13	10	3	2951
5	Jake Hobgood	6	2	2	12	4	7	9	13	8	19	23	5	5	5	17	10	7	6	9	21	17	2884
6	Charles Powell III	12	5	27	25	10	5	8	7	22	2	1	4	10	3	4	3	6	19	**22**	13	20	2840
7	Ned Combs	10	14	11	8	11	11	13	5	6	5	24	15	7	6	5	5	8	14	29	8	8	2809
8	Ricky Bryant	19	23	4	18	6	16	28	8	10	4	7	18	18	11	14	6	9	15	4	17	7	2688
9	Larry Caudill	20	30	9	6	3	12	7	4	7	3	9	19	14	18	6	16	21	8	24	5		2600
10	Gary Moore	23	11	6	11	8	4	11	11	9	8	6	13	21	30		4	13	10	8	14		2474
11	Doc Brewer	39	24	5	22	20	10	5	16	20	24	19	20	16	20	10	9	11	11	11	7	14	2446
12	Robert Luckadoo	15	9	7	27	26	23	25	17	21	29	8	8	13	16	13	12	10	20	12	19	13	2407
13	Scott Weaver	16	28	25	16	5	19	15	19	5	25	**15**	1*	31	27	22	19	14	26	28	24	9	2292
14	Christian Elder	2	20	17	26	14	13	14	3	19	**17**	21		1*	23	18		16		2		19	2093
15	Pat Patterson	11	22	12	21	19	22	6	14	DNS	26	16	16	25	17	16	21	18					1852
16	Jon Redman	24	17	8	9	15	15	16			10	20		8	21	11			23		DNQ	6	1754
17	Monk Gulledge	42	25	20	3	**21**	3	4	12	3	18	3	14	20	14								1729
18	Steve Barnes	DNQ	32		30		20	10	18	17	14	13	11	22	DNQ	21			24	36	DNQ		1481
19	Jimmy Gross				23	12		26			12		10		9	9	14	12	17	19	9		1447
20	Mickey York	41	4	21	29		2	20			28			17	7					10	11	15	1368
21	B. J. Mackey	40			4			19	6						4	2	20		7	23	20	28	1314
22	Greg Dodgens	21		15	10	17	21				16	11			8		18		13		26		1269
23	Darryl Murray	3	21		13	18	14			25	20			6	29				9		23		1268
24	Robert Ham	13	13	19	5	13	24	27	9	11	22												1171
25	Ernie Yarborough	17	27	13	20	22			10		27	22		DNQ	25				DNQ				1047
26	David Hutto																7	2*	**1***	1*	1	24	947
27	Danny Bagwell	34	15	14										11					27	18	**25**	1*	935
28	Junior Miller	30	7	22				21	15		11			28	24					25			922
29	Charlie Smith			18			17			14			9						DNQ		15		662
30	Rusty Wise							12				12			10				25		16		649
31	Bobby Dayton												17	23				15		5		22	637
32	Michael Cogdell	DNQ		10	28			22		13		5											623
33	George Crenshaw	33	6											33						6		4	588
34	Allen Wellman	DNQ	8	23	17	23		17															576
35	Wally Leatherwood		26							12		18		24					DNQ		28		564
36	Davis Myers	DNQ			19				21		21	17			26								531
37	Steven Barfield				14				20				12		19						DNQ		512
38	Billy Joyner				32	16		18							DNQ					34		27	498
39	Mike Watts	35	31			24					13			15									461
40	Donny Duchesne	9	18																	16		29	438
41	Donnie Neuenberger	7												12		DNQ							434
42	Doug Thompson		10	26		25								32									426
43	Keith Fricke				33					15		DNQ			28				DNQ				422
44	Shane Jenkins	28	3											29									390
45	Done Deese							DNS		23						19	17						388
46	Ken Bellamy																		18	7		12	382
47	Eric Rogers																13		DNQ	17	DNQ		379
48	Robert McCormick				24										12			22					379
49	Chris Vanadore				31										DNQ		23		DNQ	27			374
50	Danny Mathis										23			26	22						22		373
51	Roger Nance																	17		26		16	312
52	James Trout									24						20		DNQ					288
53	Roger Moser	DNQ												19						33		21	283
54	Greg Goodell																15	20		35			279
55	Tim Hayes									16		25									DNQ		261
56	Chris Hall																		22		6		247
57	Johnny Smith																		16		12		242
58	David Amick	27									7												228
59	Perry Whisnant														DNQ				DNQ		18		225
60	Eric Wilson	25																	12				215
61	Dennis Setzer	26																				11	215
62	Shane Sawyer																			15		23	212
63	Keith Wilson	14																	DNQ				179
64	Matt Barnes															12			DNQ				179
65	David Heitzhaus	DNQ									30			30									177
66	Dave Stacy	18	DSQ																				173
67	Justin Hobgood																22				DNQ		161
68	Billy Bigley Jr.																			30		**25**	161
69	A. J. Frank		29											27									158
70	James Dent	22	DNS																				158
71	Dexter Canipe																		5				155
72	Bill Hennecy	8																					142
73	Donnie Apple						8																142
74	Paul Carr	29												34									137
75	Edward Howell	36																		32			122
76	Joe Ferebee															15							118
77	Gary Laton													DNQ							DNQ		110
78	Lee Farthing																					18	109
79	Richard Noda																	19					106
80	Derrick Kelley																			20			103
81	Keith Roggen																			21			100
82	Jody Turner																	DNQ					91
83	Clint Thomas							24															91
84	Eddie Kelley																					26	85
85	Justin Labonte																				27		82
86	Steve Brown																		28				79
87	Barry Fitzgerald																				DNQ		73
88	Andy Houston	31																					70
89	Sonny Yokum	DNQ												DNQ									62
90	Alex Leatherwood											DNQ											55
91	Rock Harris													DNQ									55
92	Robert Dayton																				DNQ		52
93	Chad Branham	37																					52
94	John Schafer											DNQ											49
95	Brian Ross	38																					49
96	Marty Houston	DNQ																					19
97	Carl Horton	DNQ																					16
Pos	Driver	DAY	HOM	KIN	MYB	LAN	CAR	TRI	FLO	HCY	BRI	GRE	SNM	CLT	MYB	LAN	SUM	STA	HCY	USA	CON	HOM	Points

== See also ==
- 1997 NASCAR Winston Cup Series
- 1997 NASCAR Busch Series
- 1997 NASCAR Craftsman Truck Series
- 1997 NASCAR Winston West Series
