= Jimmy Gross =

American racing driver

- Nationality: American
- Born: Bowling Green, Kentucky, U.S.

NASCAR Goody's Dash Series career
- Debut season: 1997
- Years active: 1997–1999
- Starts: 45
- Championships: 0
- Wins: 0
- Poles: 0
- Best finish: 12th in 1998
- Statistics up to date as of January 8, 2025.

Jimmy Gross (birth date unknown) is an American former professional stock car racing driver who competed in the NASCAR Goody's Dash Series from 1997 to 1999.

== Motorsports results ==
=== NASCAR ===
(key) (Bold – Pole position awarded by qualifying time. Italics – Pole position earned by points standings or practice time. * – Most laps led.)

==== Goody's Dash Series ====
NASCAR Goody's Dash Series results
Year	Team	No.	Make	1	2	3	4	5	6	7	8	9	10	11	12	13	14	15	16	17	18	19	20	21	NGDS	Pts	Ref
1997	N/A	26	Pontiac	DAY	HOM	KIN	MYB; 23	LAN; 12	CAR	TRI; 26	FLO	HCY	BRI; 12	GRE	SNM; 10	CLT	MYB; 9	LAN; 9	SUM; 14	STA; 12	HCY; 17	USA; 19	CON; 9	HOM	19th	1447	
1998	N/A	26	Pontiac	DAY; 38	HCY; 26	CAR; 17	CLT; 15	TRI; 7	LAN; 5	BRI; 10	SUM; 9	GRE; 18	ROU; 16	SNM; 10	MYB; 7	CON; 21	HCY; 23	LAN; 14	STA; 21	LOU; 17	VOL; 19	USA; 35	HOM		12th	2132	
1999	N/A	26	Pontiac	DAY; 8	HCY; 16	CAR; 24	CLT; 19	BRI; 18	LOU; 18	SUM; 18	GRE	ROU; 21	STA	MYB; 16	HCY; 10	LAN; 12	USA; 22	JAC; 24	LAN; 13						17th	1569	
