= Chris Hall (racing driver) =

British racing driver (born 1954)

- Nationality: British
- Born: September 4, 1954 (age 72) London, United Kingdom

NASCAR Goody's Dash Series career
- Debut season: 1997
- Years active: 1997–1998
- Starts: 22
- Championships: 0
- Wins: 0
- Poles: 1
- Best finish: 11th in 1998
- Statistics up to date as of January 8, 2025.

Chris Hall (born September 4, 1954) is a British former professional auto racing driver who competed in the NASCAR Goody's Dash Series and the American Le Mans Series.

Hall has also competed in the United States Racing Association.

== Motorsports results ==
=== NASCAR ===
(key) (Bold – Pole position awarded by qualifying time. Italics – Pole position earned by points standings or practice time. * – Most laps led.)

==== Goody's Dash Series ====
NASCAR Goody's Dash Series results
Year	Team	No.	Make	1	2	3	4	5	6	7	8	9	10	11	12	13	14	15	16	17	18	19	20	21	NGDS	Pts	Ref
1997	N/A	39	Pontiac	DAY	HOM	KIN	MYB	LAN	CAR	TRI	FLO	HCY	BRI	GRE	SNM	CLT	MYB	LAN	SUM	STA	HCY; 22	USA	CON; 6	HOM	56th	247	
1998	N/A	33	Pontiac	DAY; 9	HCY; 13	CAR; 19	CLT; 33	TRI; 19	LAN; 23	BRI; 21	SUM; 17	GRE; 21	ROU; 23	SNM; 6	MYB; 18	CON; 11	HCY; 10	LAN; 8	STA; 13	LOU; 10	VOL; 7	USA; 23	HOM; 18		11th	2310	
