= Southside Speedway =

Former motorsport track in the United States

The Toughest Short Track in the South
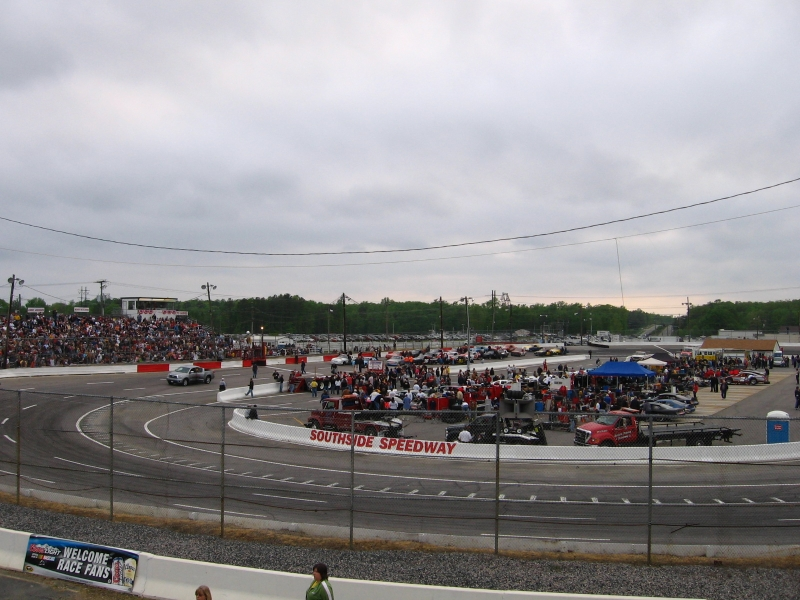
- Pre Race ceremonies for a 2009 Denny Hamlin Charity event benefiting the Cystic Fibrosis Foundation.
- Location: Midlothian, Virginia
- Coordinates: 37.450929°N 77.629130°W
- Capacity: ~6,000
- Owner: J.M. Wilkinson
- Operator: Sue Clements; Patsy Stargardt
- Opened: April 15, 1959
- Closed: December 11, 2020
- Former names: Royall Speedway

Oval
- Surface: Asphalt
- Length: 0.33 mi (0.53 km)
- Turns: 10°
- Banking: 12°

Southside Speedway was a short track used for stock car auto racing located South of Richmond, Virginia in Chesterfield County. On December 11, 2020, the track announced it would be closing permanently after the 2020 season was cancelled due to the COVID-19 pandemic. It is a .333-mile (0.536 km) asphalt oval owned and operated by Sue Clements and Patsy Stargardt. The track originally canceled the 2011 racing season after announcing that owner Sue Clements was battling health problems. However, a shortened 11-week 2011 season later took place, which saw the return of the Legends and Pro Six divisions.

Lin O’Neal, the former #1 race car driver at the track in Grand stock division who had been banned by the previous private owners, has now purchased the raceway from the County of Chesterfield and plans to re-open it to its former beauty. As of March 2025, plans are in place to rebuild.

== History ==
Southside Speedway, known as Royall Speedway in the early 1950s, first opened in 1949 and hosted midget races. The track was built by Nelson Royall, who leased the land from the Wilkerson family. It reopened on April 15, 1959 with Modifieds as the feature division. For a few years, it was used as a part of NASCAR's early circuit. The first NASCAR Cup Series race on Southside Speedway happened on August 18, 1961. At that time, the track was a 1/4 mile dirt oval. At 58.86 miles per hour (94.73 km/h), Junior Johnson took the pole for the 150-lap race in his 1960 Pontiac. He led every lap of the race that took about 45 minutes to race. By the next year, Southside Speedway had become a 1/3 mile asphalt oval. At 71.45 miles per hour (114.99 km/h), Rex White took the pole, but would duck out on lap 134 with engine trouble, which would lead Jimmy Pardue to win the 200-lap feature in his 1962 Pontiac. Richard Petty would finish third in that race. Later that season, Rex White's bad luck would continue. After leading 276 laps of a 300 lap feature, he would lose his lead to Cliff Stewart, who would win the event in his 1962 Pontiac. The last main circuit race recorded at Southside Speedway was on May 19, 1963, in which Ned Jarrett would lead the most laps and win the 300-lap feature in his 1963 Ford. Since this time, Southside Speedway has been used to house several NASCAR syndicated feature series, in which the track has seen great names such as Darrell Waltrip and Bobby Allison turn left at the 1/3 mile track.

Throughout the track's history, there has often been one or two single divisions that brought the fans to the track, and several other novelty divisions that have been used by drivers as a stepping stone to the more prominent divisions. Usually, the more prominent division has been any variety of late model cars or modifieds, and its immediate predecessor division has been the Grand Stock class, or something similar, such as Pure Stocks.

During the 1970s, three names emerged that would plant the seed for future generations of competition at Southside Speedway. Ray Hendrick, Cal Johnson and Ted Hairfield were older drivers whose sons and grandsons have become competitive forces throughout the decades.

=== The Hendricks ===
Ray Hendrick raced his burgundy Modified car during the 1960s and 1970s, and quickly planted the seed for the Hendrick dynasty. In 1974 and 1975, he placed 8th and 9th respectively in the National Late Model Sportsman Points, which would later become known as the Busch Grand National Series. At Martinsville Speedway, Ray Hendrick is 1st in all-time wins after he won 20 collective races between 1963 and 1975. He sits atop this list of great drivers including Richard Petty and Geoff Bodine. Ray Hendrick is best known for his philosophy of racing anywhere and everywhere. He participated in 17 NASCAR Winston Cup races, of which he captured six career top fives. Cancer claimed Ray Hendrick's life on September 28, 1990.

Later down the road, his son Roy Hendrick would enter the Late Model Stock Car division in a Pontiac whose paint scheme would become identical to his father's modified car. These cars were burgundy, whose white number 11 was encased in a white circle with a wing coming from the side. Roy Hendrick also made a name for himself and neighboring short tracks that feature Late Model-type racing including Langley Speedway in Hampton, Virginia and South Boston Speedway. Roy Hendrick dominated Southside Speedway for years, because of which he is commonly referred to as "Rapid" Roy Hendrick. Because of his and his father's reign at these tracks, the "Flying Eleven" logo has become as common among the Virginia short track circuit as Dale Earnhardt's number three has become an iconic symbol among the NASCAR circuit. Over the past few years, Roy's son, Brandon Hendrick has peeked his head into the Late Model Sportsman and Modified divisions. Brandon currently races the number 55 car in Southside Speedway's Late Model Sportsman division. Roy Hendrick currently races the number 39 car in the Late Model Sportsman division at Southside Speedway. Also Roy Hendrick has of late mentored a driver named Mark Simpson #36 driving a car in the Grand Stock division maintained by Roy and won in only his 6th race and has finished 2nd in points in 2009 and 3rd in 2010 and has numerous heat and feature wins and also won the 2008 Thanksgiving Classic at Southern National Speedway, in keeping with the Hendrick tradition.

=== The 1980s ===
During the mid to late 1980s, the three prominent divisions at Southside Speedway were the Late Model Stock Cars, Grand Stocks and Mini Stocks. The elite of Southside Speedway's limelight through the 1980s was shared by the rivalry between Wayne Patterson and Roy Hendrick, but Bugs Hairfield, Roger Sawyer, David Blankenship and Eddie Johnson was always in competition, and passed the track championship around throughout the decade. On Saturdays in the late 1980s and early 1990s, the track would often feature an enduro race that would include upwards of 80 cars racing in a 100-lap melee. These races were incredibly hard to keep up with, as the track was constantly completely congested with cars. The track would also feature a number of other divisions on certain occasions, including Modifieds, Pure Stocks, Factory Stocks, Go-Karts, and many others.

In the early 1990s, Southside Speedway created an Enduro-type division that would race every week with the rest of the Friday night racing activity. Originally, these cars were called Street Stocks, but the name was changed the next year or two years later to "Southside Chargers."

Wayne Patterson lost his sponsorship with Pabst Blue Ribbon during the late 1980s, giving way for Roy Hendrick to dominate the Late Model Stock Cars throughout the early 1990s. The battle for second was almost always fought between Bugs Hairfield, Eddie Johnson and Shayne Lockhart. This continued until Wayne Patterson made his return during the mid-1990s and resurged the Hendrick/Patterson rivalry. During the mid-1990s, Shayne Lockhart was the dominant force, and Eddie Johnson fell into the limelight during the late 1990s.

=== Denny Hamlin ===
Denny Hamlin first started racing in the Mini Stock division at Southside Speedway in 1997. Within the next five years, he would see his share of wins and track records at Southside Speedway, as well as in neighboring tracks in Southampton, Langley and South Boston. After racing in the Craftsman Truck Series and the Busch Series, Hamlin was signed by Joe Gibbs Racing and ran his first full-time Nextel Cup season in 2006. That year, he swept both races at Pocono International Raceway, earned the Nextel Cup Rookie of the Year title, and qualified for the Chase for the Sprint Cup. Curtis Markham, former Southside Speedway track champion, is currently Hamlin's spotter.

From 2008 to 2010, Hamlin has hosted the Denny Hamlin Short Track Showdown (previously known as the Denny Hamlin 175), which later moved to Richmond International Raceway.

=== The Present ===
During the mid-2000s, Southside Speedway vastly expanded its horizons by offering up to eight divisions of racing. The two main attractions, the Late Model Sportsman division and the Modified division, typically alternate between their respected Friday nights. Chris Dodson was the 2007 track champion in the Late Model Sportsman division and Thomas Stinson was the 2007 Modified track Champion. To keep the three family traditions going, Brandon Hendrick and Chris Hairfield, grandsons of Ray Hendrick and Ted Hairfield and sons of Roy Hendrick and Bug's Hairfield, have become contenders in the Late Model Sportsman division. Chris Johnson, grandson of Cal Johnson and son of Eddie Johnson, also races the #36 car in the Modified division and won his first feature event on opening night of 2008. During the 2007 season the two feature divisions were dominated by Chris Dodson in the Late Model Sportsman division and Thomas Stinson in the Modified Division. Rudy was the only driver other than Stinson to win in the Modified division in 2007.

That changed in 2008. The new seven-car invert before each race made winning harder for Thomas Stinson. It opened the door for drivers like Chris Johnson and Billy Morris to take victory lane, but Stinson’s consistency kept him comfortable in the points lead.

Stinson has dominated the Modified division, largely because he invests far more money into his car and team than anyone else. In clean air, his performance advantage is obvious. Even with the seven-car invert and shorter 33-lap races, fans usually watch Southside Modified events just to see if Stinson has enough time to work his way to the front.

The Late Model Sportsman division is different. Qualifying often decides the winner, but it could be almost anyone on any given night. In the Modified division, if Stinson shows up, he usually wins. Between 2006 and 2008, he won 48 of 76 races (63%), including 9 out of 12 in 2007.

== Current Racing Divisions ==
=== Late Model Sportsman ===
The Late Model Sportsman division essentially entails cars built for racing that are modeled after modern 4-door sedans. The cars are typically badged as Chevrolet Monte Carlos, Dodge Chargers, Toyota Camrys, or Ford Fusions, but are built ground-up for racing. Like cars featured in the NASCAR Sprint Cup Series, they are "stock" cars in theory. Aside from being shaped similar to the street model cars they represent, they are essentially fabricated and built identically, and for the sole purpose of stock car racing. Parts may be built by different manufacturers and may come from a differing manufacturing process, however the differences between the cars themselves are negligible. This is opposed to other divisions like Grand Stocks or Street Stocks in which actual street cars are gutted and fitted with the necessary modifications for the race track. It is a common misconception that the Late Model Stock Car division was renamed to Late Model Sportsman at some point. According to track ownership, the current Late Model Sportsman division is a result of the 2003 migration from the old Grand Stock division. Technically, the current Grand Stock division is a new division, and the Late Model Stock Cars are now defunct. The older Late Model Stock Cars were highly modified street cars, but the new Late Model Sportsman cars are actual racing cars with fabricated bodies and contain mostly racing parts. The current Late Model Sportsman division qualifies via time trials and runs features of 150 laps, 100 laps, 75 laps, or 50 laps.

=== Modifieds ===
"Modifieds" are open-wheel cars that behave similarly to the Late Model Sportsman cars. Most modern Modifieds are built as if they will be raced on dirt, and the suspension is designed to drift into turns on dirt tracks as opposed to "sticking" on pavement. Though modifications are made, Modifieds are typically harder to handle on the pavement, and are still driven to glide into turns as opposed to railing around them. The Modified class was the original feature class at Southside Speedway, though by comparison, the original Modifieds and the modern class of Modifieds have opposite theories. In the early days of short track racing, all stock cars were modified street cars. From there, further modifications would be necessary for them to qualify as a part of a "Modified" class. Today, since most premier stock car racing series' feature cars built specifically for their destined racing purpose, current Modifieds are built with the premise of becoming "Modifieds." Thus, they are being used for their essential conceived purpose, and are "modified" in name-only. These cars, which are now one of the premier classes at Southside Speedway alternate with the Late Model Sportsman division, running every other Friday night. In past years they have run 100-lap features, but in 2008 they are only slated for one 100-lap feature, and most other nights they are scheduled to run twin 50-lap races.

=== Grand Stock ===
The Grand Stock class as seen as the first level under the Late Model Sportsman and the Modifieds. While Southside Speedway has historically almost always had a Grand Stock division, this is seen as a "new" division as of a few years ago. This class is the more premier class of actual street cars. While the front-end may be customized, the rest of the body is mainly stock. Almost always 90% of a Grand Stock field will consist of the Monte Carlo of the late 1980s. The Grand Stock division runs 30-lap races and qualifies via 10-lap heat races.

=== U-Cars ===
The U-Cars were debuted in 2003. While Southside Speedway features a karting division, the U-Cars are seen as the beginning class. U-Car is an acronym meaning "U Can Afford to Race", and encompasses American-made 4-cylinder cars. The U-Car race is seen as a "new" division, but is practically a recycled version of the Mini Stock class of the 1980s and 1990s.

=== Street Stock ===
The Street Stock division is the evolution of the old Enduro Races on Saturdays brought to Southside Speedway by Joe Kelly in the mid-1980s. During the late 1980s, Southside began experimenting with an Enduro-type class on Friday nights by bringing the Factory Stocks to Southside once or twice a year. When the Enduro races became a Friday night feature at Southside, they were brought on as Street Stocks and eventually became the Southside Chargers. After the series was changed back to Street Stock for several years, they were disbanded for a few years. They were brought back in the mid-2000s, being known as the "Enduro" division and was meant as a no-holds-barred, anything-goes division. After the apparent need for some safety considerations were met, the Enduro cars were fitted with roll cages, the rules were changed and the division became known as Street Stocks again.

== Attendance ==
Southside Speedway's attendance varied greatly throughout its history, with some periods of low attendance threatening the track's future. During the early 1980s, attendance was an issue as the track found it difficult to find cars to race, and race promoters would often provide additional incentives to encourage attendance. Around this time, the track was condemned by Chesterfield County because of serious safety hazards associated with the old wooden grandstands. The stands were upgraded in 1983. In the late 1980s, the track was fitted with newer aluminum grandstands that could hold twice as many fans and there was promise for a next generation to begin.

Despite these changes, Southside Speedway was rumored to be replaced by a shopping mall in 1987–88. There were even talks of building a new track to replace it in neighboring Dinwiddie County.

In the early 2000s, there was talk of possibly lengthening the track, but ultimately the decision was made to keep it the way it was. When Denny Hamlin came from Southside and landed in the Sprint Cup series, fans all over Richmond who jumped on the bandwagon caused a resurgence of attendance at Southside. In 2007, Denny Hamlin came to Southside on a Thursday night on the week of the May Sprint Cup race at Richmond International Raceway and Southside saw the best attendance it had seen in years. The following year, Denny Hamlin brought Joe Gibbs teammate Kyle Busch to the track to race in a special 175-lap Late Model Sportsman event to benefit the newly founded Denny Hamlin Foundation. Kyle Busch won that race after Denny Hamlin was sent to the rear of the field early in the event after an incident involving Billy Morris. The race put Southside Speedway in the national spotlight as the event was talked about that weekend during coverage of racing, qualifying and practice for the ensuing races at RIR on Speed and FOX.
