= Montgomery Motor Speedway =

Auto racing venue in Alabama

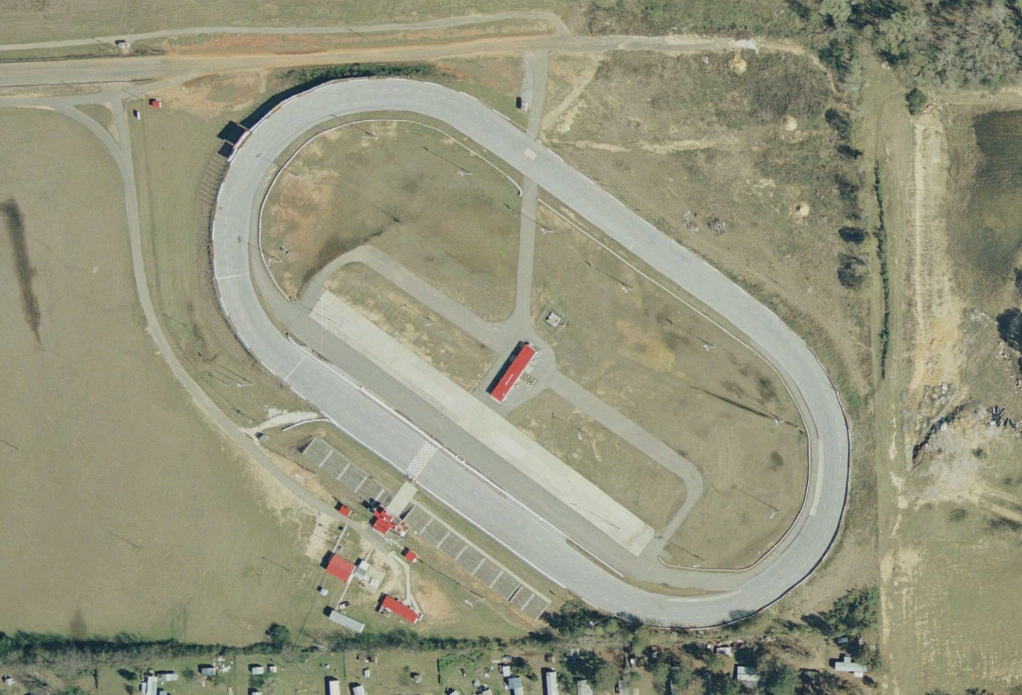
- Location: Montgomery County, near Montgomery, Alabama
- Coordinates: 32°21′25″N 86°26′44″W
- Opened: 1953
- Major events: Alabama 200; Show Me the Money; Rumble by the River
- Surface: Dirt (1953–1954); Asphalt (1954–present)
- Length: 0.500 mi (0.805 km)

Montgomery Motor Speedway is a half-mile (.805 km) oval race track just west of Montgomery, Alabama. Initially a dirt track, it opened in 1953, and is the oldest operating race track in Alabama. An asphalt track over the dirt was completed around the end of March 1954, and racing on the new track began April 11, 1954. It held six NASCAR Grand National Series races between 1955 and 1969. Huffman Motor Sports purchased the facility on February 5, 1999, and the track was extensively renovated and lighted in 1999.

In November 2004, Bill Manful bought Montgomery Motor Speedway. In 2006, then owner Bill Manful leased the track to Hyundai Motor Company, a local car manufacturer, to allow the facility to become a storage site.

In 2008, Bobby and Mark Knox of Clanton, Alabama laid claim to the speedway when they purchased it in an auction from Manful. After a lengthy legal battle to resume operations of the facility, they obtained a business license in February 2009 and opened as The New Montgomery Motor Speedway, LLC. The track is in operation running a bi-weekly schedule.

== NASCAR Grand National results ==
Season	Winning driver	Car	Laps	Average speed
April 1955	Tim Flock	Chrysler	200	60.872 mph (97.964 km/h)
September 1955	Tim Flock	Chrysler	200	63.773 mph (102.633 km/h)
1956	Marvin Panch	Ford	200	67.252 mph (108.232 km/h)
1967	Jim Paschal	Plymouth	200	72.435 mph (116.573 km/h)
1968	Richard Petty	Plymouth	200	70.644 mph (113.690 km/h)
1969	Bobby Allison	Plymouth	200	73.200 mph (117.804 km/h)
