= Caffeine and Octane's Lanier Raceway =

Racetrack in the United States

Lanier Speedway
Lanier Raceway
- Location: Hall County, Braselton, Georgia
- Coordinates: 34°9′12″N 83°48′45″W
- Owner: Lanier Speedway LLC (2025–present)
- Operator: Lanier Speedway LLC (2025–present)
- Opened: 1982
- Architect: Bud Lunsford
- Former names: Caffeine and Octane Lanier Raceway, Lanier Raceplex (2012–2021); Lanier National Speedway (1997–2011); Lanier Raceway (1982–1996)
- Major events: Former: Pro All Stars Series (2019); NASCAR Whelen Southern Modified Tour (1991, 2008–2009); CARS X1-R Pro Cup Series (2009); ARCA RE/MAX Series (2005); ASA National Tour (2000, 2003–2004); NASCAR Southeast Series (1991–2000, 2004); NASCAR Busch Grand National Series (1988–1992)

Oval
- Surface: Asphalt
- Length: 0.375 mi (0.604 km)
- Turns: 4

Lanier Speedway (formerly Caffeine and Octane Lanier Raceway and Lanier Raceplex and Lanier National Speedway) is a 0.375 mi (0.604 km) paved oval racetrack located just outside Braselton, Georgia. The track opened in 1982 as a dirt track, by Bud Lunsford and was paved in the mid-1980s. It was then owned by Donnie Clack, Jim Downing (invented the HANS device) and then in 2022, it was owned and operated by High Octane, LLC (Caffeine and Octane), an auto events & multimedia business conglomerate. It is now owned by Lanier Speedway LLC, which will keep and operate the track as part of a new Development with Commercial, Retail and Auto=Centric Theme. The Track will remain and be operated by Lanier Speedway LLC. The track was under the NASCAR Whelen All-American Series banner with super late models, SuperTrucks, Junkyard Dogs, outlaw late models, mini stocks, INEX RaceCeiver/zMax legends cars and INEX bandolero cars. The track ended weekly racing at the end of the 2011 season, but remained open for larger events. In 2022, High Octane resumed weekly car events at the raceway for the first time since 2011.

The Pro All Stars Series hosted a national super late model event at Lanier on November 15–16, 2019. This served as the PASS National Championship final. On 1 January 2022 it was reported that the track had been sold to Caffeine and Octane. C&O's Lanier Raceway is located across from the NASCAR owned Road Atlanta motor racing circuit.

== History ==
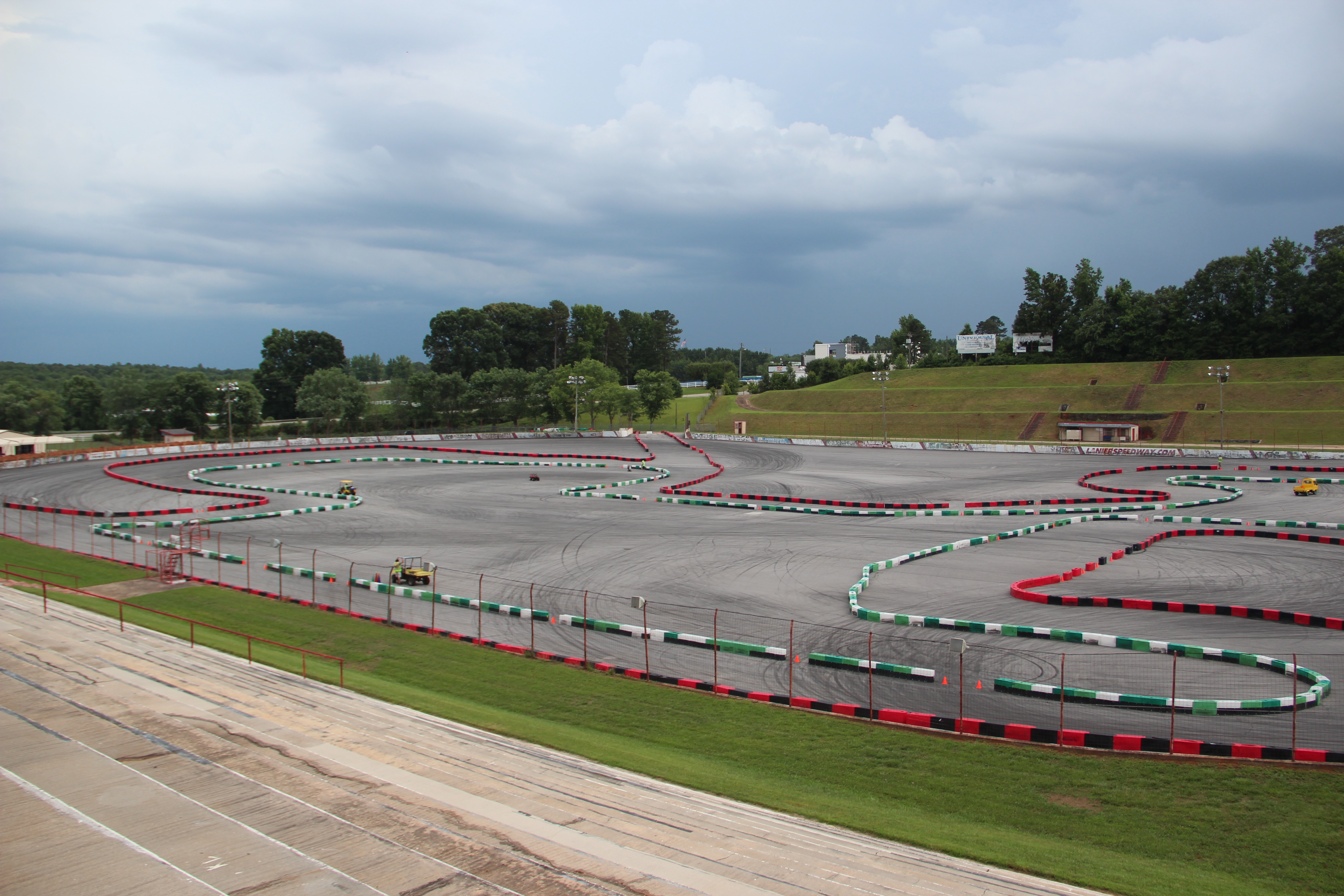
Lanier Raceway in 2019

In 1979, Bud Lundsford began building the track and Operations opened in 1982, It was owned and operated by Bud until he sold it to Donnie Clack in the mid 2000's through 2012. In 2012, Lanier National Speedway was purchased by Jim Downing and renamed "Lanier Raceplex". The new venue was to host concerts and serve as a race track August 12 photos emerged showing the infield walls, buildings, and facilities being razed in preparation for a complete "black lake" paving job of the entire infield and oval. Track amenities also received major renovations. The track reopened January 2016 and features "arrive and drive" karting, as well as hosting oval track (legends series), and drift events.

In 2021, the Lanier Raceplex functioned as an arrive and drive go-kart track and hosted a four-race legends car series in July that was broadcast on NBC Sports Gold Trackpass. A ten race series was also held for arrive and drive go karts that year.

In 2022, the now-former Lanier Raceplex was sold to High Octane Events, a multimedia motorsports event business headquartered in Atlanta, GA who also own the largest monthly car show in the world, Caffeine and Octane. C&O announced upon purchasing stated it intends to create a more actively used event space for drifting, racing, burnouts, car meets, driving competitions and other auto events with all makes and models of cars. Caffeine and Octane had resumed weekly events at the Lanier Raceway, including Friday Night Drift. As the only short, oval bank, paved track within 50 mi (80 km) of the city of Atlanta, Caffeine & Octane's Lanier Raceway had become a major hub for grassroots drifting and competition driving within the state of Georgia and across the Southeastern United States. In 2025, High Octane Events sold the property to Lanier Speedway LLC. www.lanierspeedway.com Development plans for Retail, Commercial, Residential, Hotel, and Car Condos have been listed as part of the new development plan. Comments from the Lanierspeedway.com website have stated that the Track will remain as part of the larger Development.

== NASCAR O'Reilly Auto Parts Series history ==
The NASCAR Busch Grand National Series ran five races at the track between 1988 and 1992.

Season	Winning driver	Car	Laps	Average speed
1988	Tommy Houston	Buick	200	84.191 mph (135.492 km/h)
1989	Ronald Cooper	Buick	200	77.474 mph (124.682 km/h)
1990	Chuck Bown	Pontiac	200	74.033 mph (119.145 km/h)
1991	David Green	Oldsmobile	200	73.250 mph (117.884 km/h)
1992	Bobby Labonte	Chevrolet	300	77.735 mph (125.102 km/h)

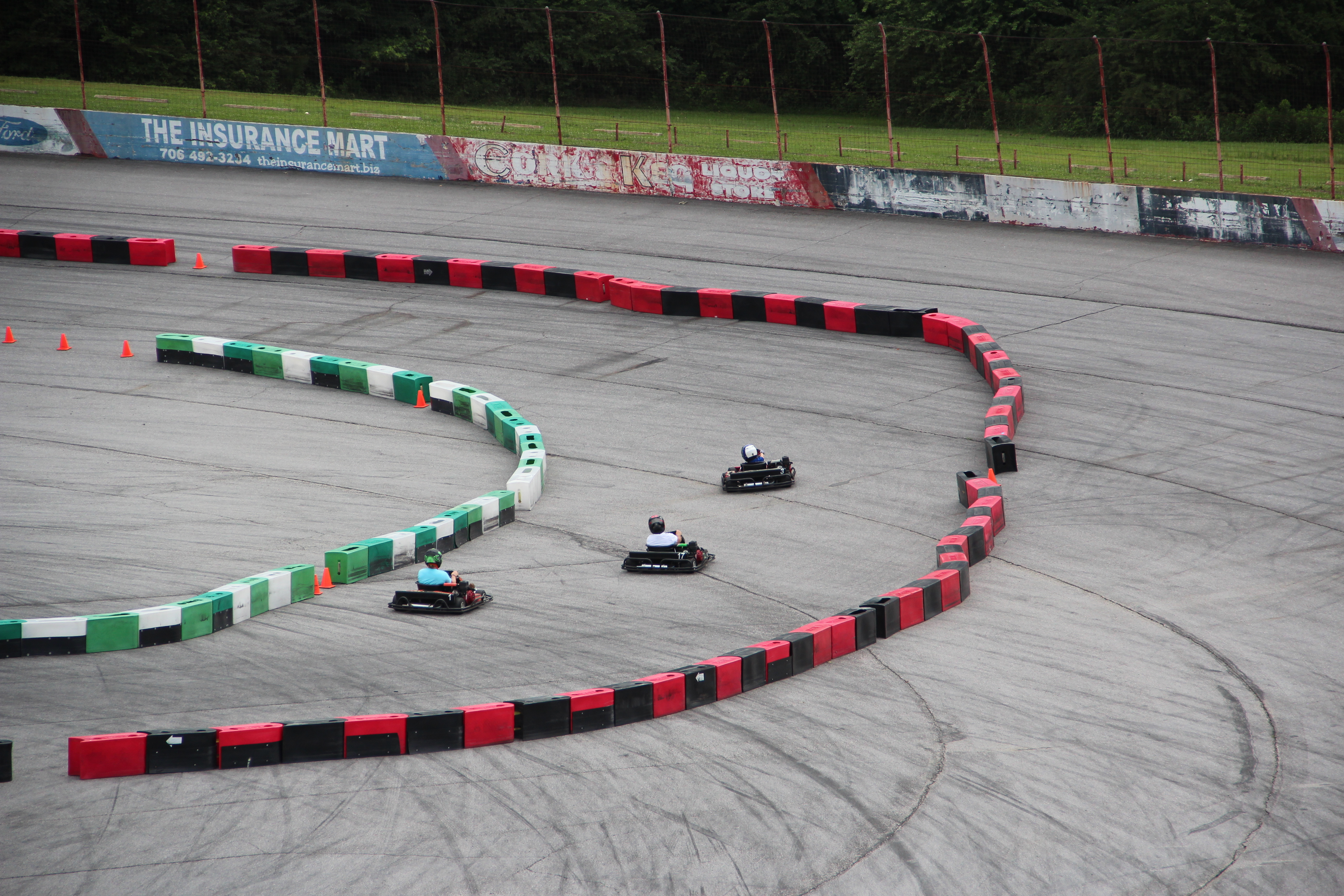
Kart racing at the Lanier Raceplex

== Other major events ==
Lanier Raceplex hosted weekly NASCAR Whelen All-American Series races.

The track hosted 17 NASCAR Southeast Series races between 1991 and 2004. The track also hosted 2 NASCAR Whelen Southern Modified Tour events: one in 2008 and the other in 2009.

The ARCA Re/Max Series had run one event at the track, in 2005. The race was won by David Ragan.

The facility hosted three ASA National Tour races between 2000 and 2004. One race was won by Scott Wimmer and the other two events were won by Mike Garvey.

CARS X1-R Pro Cup Series ran one race at the track, in 2009.
