= USA International Speedway =

Racetrack in Lakeland, Florida

- Track layout
- Location: 3401 Old Polk City Road; Lakeland, Florida 33809
- Coordinates: 28.1515°N 81.8905°W
- Opened: 1995; 31 years ago
- Closed: August 2, 2008; 17 years ago

Oval
- Surface: Concrete
- Length: 0.75 mi (1.21 km)
- Turns: 4
- Banking: Turns: 14°

USA International Speedway was a motorsports facility located near Lakeland, Florida, United States, that opened in 1995. The track was a 0.75-mile-long (1.21 km) concrete paved oval with 14° banked turns. The site lies next to the former site of Lakeland Motorsports Park, on Florida State Road 33 just north of exit 38 on Interstate 4.

The track was built on the grounds of Lakeland Interstate Speedway, also known as Lakeland International Speedway, a smaller oval track that had opened in 1971. In 1977, Lakeland International Speedway hosted Florida Sunfest, a music festival featuring 20 acts, including Jimmy Buffett. It was the largest music festival in Florida history, attracting over 100,000 fans. The event was created and produced by Richard Flanzer, of AtlanticPacific Music.

The USAR Hooters Pro Cup Series had a race at the speedway in early March and the final championship race in mid to late November. There were also several series that tested there, including the ARCA Racing Series, CRA Super Series, and the NASCAR Cup Series.

USA International Speedway hosted three NASCAR Southeast Series events from 1999 until 2001 and five races of ASA National Tour from 2000 until 2004. All the race winners had driven in NASCAR: Gary St. Amant, Mike Garvey, Joey Clanton had one win apiece, and Butch Miller won twice.

The track hosted one ARCA Racing Series event in 2007. The race was won by future NASCAR Camping World Truck Series champion James Buescher; the victory made Buescher the series' youngest-ever winner.

The speedway also hosted 40 CARS X-1R Pro Cup Series races from 1997 until 2008. Some NASCAR drivers such as Chad Chaffin, Mario Gosselin, Sean Murphy, Michael Ritch, Scott Wimmer, Bobby Gill, Shane Huffman, Clay Rogers, Benny Gordon, Brian Vickers, and Joey Logano won races at the track. The Cale Yarborough Executive Racing School operated at the track.

The track closed during the 2008 season; the final race was run on August 2, 2008. In 2010 the track was stripped of its grandstands and control tower. In early 2012 the track was completely demolished; an Amazon warehouse now sits on the property.

== ARCA Series event ==
The Construct Corps–Palm Beach Grading 250 was an Automobile Racing Club of America race at USA International Speedway in Florida. It was only held during the 2007 season.

Date	Event Name	Pole Winner	Race Winner	Manufacturer	Race Distance		Race Time	Average Speed (mph)	Report
Date	Event Name	Pole Winner	Race Winner	Manufacturer	Laps	Miles (km)	Race Time	Average Speed (mph)	Report
March 24, 2007	Construct Corps–Palm Beach Grading 250	Bobby Santos III	James Buescher	Dodge	253*	189.75 (305.37)	2:37:32	82.605	Report

- Race was extended from 250 to 253 laps due to a green-white-checker finish.
