= Robert Huffman =

American racing driver (born 1968)

- Born: March 12, 1968 (age 58); Claremont, North Carolina, U.S.
- Achievements: 1990, 1998, 1999, 2000, 2003 NASCAR Goody's Dash Series Champion

NASCAR O'Reilly Auto Parts Series career
- 11 races run over 3 years
- Best finish: 62nd (1992)
- First race: 1991 Champion 300 (Charlotte)
- Last race: 1993 All Pro 300 (Charlotte)
Wins	Top tens	Poles
0	0	0

NASCAR FedEx Freight Truck Series career
- 40 races run over 3 years
- Best finish: 23rd (2004)
- First race: 1997 Loadhandler 200 (Bristol)
- Last race: 2005 O'Reilly 200 (Memphis)
Wins	Top tens	Poles
0	8	0
- Statistics up to date as of January 15, 2012.

Robert Huffman (born March 12, 1968) is an American former stock car racing driver from Claremont, North Carolina. He drove in eleven NASCAR Busch Series between 1991 and 1993. He next raced two NASCAR Craftsman Truck Series races in 1997. He returned to the series full-time in 2004; that year he had six top-ten finishes in 24 (of 25) events to finish 23rd in season points. He most recently drove the No. 12 Toyota Tundra in 2005; he raced in 14 events with two top-ten finishes.

Huffman won five championships in NASCAR's Goody's Dash Series.

== Personal life ==
Huffman's son, Landon Huffman, currently competes in NASCAR, driving part-time in the Truck and ARCA Series since 2016.

== Motorsports career results ==
=== NASCAR ===
(key) (Bold – Pole position awarded by qualifying time. Italics – Pole position earned by points standings or practice time. * – Most laps led.)

==== Busch Series ====
NASCAR Busch Series results
Year	Team	No.	Make	1	2	3	4	5	6	7	8	9	10	11	12	13	14	15	16	17	18	19	20	21	22	23	24	25	26	27	28	29	30	31	32	33	34	35	NBSC	Pts	Ref
1991	J. V. Huffman Sr.	39	Olds	DAY	RCH	CAR	MAR	VOL	HCY; DNQ	DAR	BRI	LAN	SBO	NZH	CLT; 35	DOV	ROU	HCY	MYB	GLN	OXF	NHA	SBO	DUB	IRP	ROU	BRI	DAR; 38	RCH	DOV	CLT; DNQ	NHA	CAR; 26	MAR					76th	192	
1992	J. V. Huffman Sr.	39	Olds	DAY; 37	CAR	RCH																									CLT; 42	MAR	CAR						62nd	305	
1992	J. V. Huffman Sr.	39	Buick				ATL; 34	MAR	DAR	BRI	HCY	LAN	DUB	NZH	CLT	DOV	ROU	MYB	GLN	VOL	NHA													HCY; 22					62nd	305	
1992	Deep South Racing	29	Pontiac																			TAL; 35	IRP	ROU	MCH	NHA	BRI	DAR	RCH	DOV									62nd	305	
1993	Info not available			DAY	CAR	RCH	DAR	BRI	HCY; DNQ	ROU	MAR	NZH																											72nd	174	
1993	Kelly Huffman	39	Olds										CLT; 41	DOV	MYB	GLN	MLW	TAL	IRP	MCH	NHA	BRI	DAR; 35	RCH	DOV	ROU	CLT; 29	MAR	CAR	HCY	ATL								72nd	174	
1994	Info not available		Ford	DAY	CAR	RCH	ATL	MAR	DAR	HCY	BRI	ROU	NHA	NZH	CLT; DNQ	DOV	MYB	GLN	MLW	SBO	TAL	HCY	IRP	MCH	BRI	DAR	RCH	DOV	CLT	MAR	CAR								N/A	0	

==== Craftsman Truck Series ====
NASCAR Craftsman Truck Series results
Year	Team	No.	Make	1	2	3	4	5	6	7	8	9	10	11	12	13	14	15	16	17	18	19	20	21	22	23	24	25	26	NCTC	Pts	Ref
1997	Ted Phillips	37	Ford	WDW	TUS	HOM	PHO	POR	EVG	I70	NHA	TEX	BRI; 33	NZH	MLW	LVL	CNS	HPT												84th	171	
1997	Ted Phillips	87	Ford																IRP; 29	FLM	NSV	GLN	RCH; DNQ	MAR	SON	MMR	CAL	PHO	LVS	84th	171	
2004	Innovative Motorsports	12	Toyota	DAY; 36	ATL; 29	MAR; 34	MFD; DNQ	CLT; 16	DOV; 11	TEX; 28	MEM; 16	MLW; 36	KAN; 24	KEN; 10	GTW; 27	MCH; 9	IRP; 23	NSH; 8	BRI; 32	RCH; 6	NHA; 32	LVS; 31	CAL; 17	TEX; 29	MAR; 10	PHO; 31	DAR; 9	HOM; 35		23rd	2314	
2005	Darrell Waltrip Motorsports	12	Toyota	DAY; 19	CAL; 9	ATL; 10	MAR; 19	GTY; 35	MFD; 33	CLT; 21	DOV; 35	TEX; 29	MCH; 19	MLW; 31	KAN; 18	KEN; 30	MEM; 31	IRP	NSH	BRI	RCH	NHA	LVS	MAR	ATL	TEX	PHO	HOM		30th	1271	

==== Goody's Dash Series ====
NASCAR Goody's Dash Series results
Year	Team	No.	Make	1	2	3	4	5	6	7	8	9	10	11	12	13	14	15	16	17	18	19	20	21	NGDS	Pts	Ref
1989	N/A	75	Pontiac	DAY	FLO	NRV	HCY; 1**	CON	LAN	SBO	NSV	SUM	LAN	AND	BGS	MYB	HCY; 22	LAN							38th	180	
1990	N/A	75	Pontiac	DAY; 2	NRV; 6	AND; 7	LAN; 2	FLO; 14	STH; 9	SUM; 1	LAN; 1	BGS; 4	HCY; 2	CON; 2	TRI; 13	MYB; 2	ACE; 1*	LAN; 1	HCY; 2						1st	2579	
1991	N/A	75	Pontiac	DAY; 10	FIF	NRV	BGS	FLO	LAN	SUM	STH	LAN	BGS	HCY	MYB	ACE	HCY	SHO	NSV						42nd	134	
1992	N/A	75	Pontiac	DAY	HCY	LON	FLO	LAN	SUM	STH	BGS	MYB	NRV; 4	SUM; 7*	ACE; 15	HCY; 2	VOL; 2								23rd	764	
1994	Orr Racing	9	Pontiac	DAY; 9	VOL	FLO	SUM	CAR	411	HCY	LAN	BRI	SUM	FLO	BGS	MYB									33rd	397	
1994	Robert Huffman	37	Pontiac														NRV; 26	ASH	VOL	HCY; 8					33rd	397	
1995	Robert Huffman	37	Pontiac	DAY; 5	**FLO**; 1**	**LAN**; 2	MYB; 6*	SUM; 2	HCY; 26	CAR; 6*	STH; 6	BRI; 5	SUM; 2	GRE; 15	BGS; 15	MYB; 4	NSV; 10	FLO; 6	NWS; 8	VOL; 2	HCY; 12*				3rd	2745	
1995	N/A	41	Pontiac																			HOM; 24			3rd	2745	
1996	Robert Huffman	37	Pontiac	DAY; 33	HOM; 20	MYB; 1	SUM; 2	NSV; 3	TRI; 6	CAR; 3	**HCY**; 2*	FLO; 1	BRI; 3	SUM; 4	GRE; 20	SNM; 6	BGS; 13	MYB; 8	LAN; 5	STH; 5	FLO; 16	NWS; 2	VOL; 2	HCY; 1	2nd	3136	
1997	Robert Huffman	37	Pontiac	DAY; 4	**HOM**; 1	KIN; 16	MYB; 2	LAN; 9	CAR; 18	TRI; 23	FLO; 23	**HCY**; 1**	BRI; 15	GRE; 2	SNM; 7	CLT; 9	MYB; 13	LAN; 8	SUM; 2	STA; 1	HCY; 21	USA; 13	CON; 10	HOM; 3	4th	2951	
1998	Robert Huffman	37	Pontiac	DAY; 2	HCY; 2	CAR; 10*	CLT; 3	**TRI**; 1*	**LAN**; 1*	BRI; 1	**SUM**; 1**	GRE; 2	ROU; 2	SNM; 1*	**MYB**; 1**	**CON**; 1	**HCY**; 2	LAN; 5*	STA; 3	LOU; 1*	VOL; 2	USA; 25*			1st	3285	
1998	Robert Huffman	90	Pontiac																				HOM; 15		1st	3285	
1999	Robert Huffman	37	Pontiac	DAY; 2	HCY; 1	**CAR**; 1**	**CLT**; 1*	BRI; 4*	LOU; 1**	SUM; 7	GRE; 2	ROU; 17	**STA**; 1**	MYB; 1**	**HCY**; 2*	**LAN**; 9	USA; 1*	JAC; 3	LAN; 24						1st	2582	
2000	Robert Huffman	37	Pontiac	DAY; 1	MON; 1	**STA**; 4	JAC; 1*	**CAR**; 4	CLT; 1*	SBO; 23	ROU; 12	LOU; 6	SUM; 6	GRE; 2	SNM; 2	MYB; 4	BRI; 9	HCY; 2	JAC; 3	USA; 11	LAN; 7				1st	2810	
2001	Robert Huffman	37	Toyota	DAY; 6	ROU; 18*	DAR; 21	**CLT**; 28*	LOU; 6	JAC; 5	**KEN**; 1	SBO; 3	DAY; 1*	GRE; 2	SNM; 3*	**NRV**; 1	MYB; 4	BRI; 22	ACE; 16	JAC; 3	USA; 11	NSH; 1				3rd	2630	
2002	Robert Huffman	37	Toyota	DAY; 1	HAR; 1	ROU; 5	LON; 18	CLT; 1*	KEN; 2*	**MEM**; 4	**GRE**; 4	SNM; 4*	SBO; 5	MYB; 24	**BRI**; 9	MOT; 6	ATL; 6								2nd	2138	
2003	Robert Huffman	37	Toyota	DAY; 1	OGL; 4		SBO; 4	GRE; 6	KEN; 1	BRI; 2	ATL; 5														1st	1335	
2003	Robert Huffman	37	Pontiac			CLT; 1																			1st	1335	

=== ARCA Permatex SuperCar Series ===
(key) (Bold – Pole position awarded by qualifying time. Italics – Pole position earned by points standings or practice time. * – Most laps led.)

ARCA Permatex SuperCar Series results
Year	Team	No.	Make	1	2	3	4	5	6	7	8	9	10	11	12	13	14	15	16	17	18	19	20	APSCSC	Pts	Ref
1991	J. V. Huffman Sr.	72	Buick	DAY	ATL	KIL	TAL	TOL	FRS	POC	MCH	KIL	FRS	DEL	POC	TAL	HPT	MCH	ISF	TOL	DSF	TWS	ATL; 30			

Sporting positions
Preceded by Gary Wade Finley	NASCAR Dash Series Champion; 1990	Succeeded by Johnny Chapman
Preceded by Mike Swaim Jr.	NASCAR Goody's Dash Series Champion; 1998, 1999, 2000	Succeeded by Cam Strader
Preceded by Jake Hobgood	NASCAR Goody's Dash Series Champion; 2003	Succeeded by Johnny Chapman
