= Chuck Gafrarar =

American racing driver

- Nationality: American
- Born: April 23, 1970 (age 56) Lancaster, Pennsylvania, U.S.

NASCAR Goody's Dash Series career
- Debut season: 2001
- Years active: 2001–2003
- Starts: 22
- Championships: 0
- Wins: 0
- Poles: 0
- Best finish: 9th in 2002
- Statistics up to date as of December 20, 2024.

Chuck Gafrarar (born April 23, 1970) is an American former professional stock car racing driver who competed in the NASCAR Goody's Dash Series from 2001 to 2003.

Gafrarar has previously competed in the NASCAR Southeast Series.

== Motorsports results ==
=== NASCAR ===
(key) (Bold – Pole position awarded by qualifying time. Italics – Pole position earned by points standings or practice time. * – Most laps led.)

==== Goody's Dash Series ====
NASCAR Goody's Dash Series results
Year	Team	No.	Make	1	2	3	4	5	6	7	8	9	10	11	12	13	14	15	16	17	18	NGDS	Pts	Ref
2001	N/A	14	Pontiac	DAY	ROU	DAR	CLT	LOU	JAC	KEN	SBO	DAY	GRE	SNM	NRV	MYB	BRI	ACE	JAC; 8	USA; 4	NSH; 20	40th	405	
2002	N/A	26	Pontiac	DAY; 12	HAR; 7	ROU; 7	LON; 3	CLT; 31														9th	1801	
2002	N/A	52	Pontiac						KEN; 4	MEM; 12	GRE; 5	SNM; 19	SBO; 17	MYB; 12	BRI; 15	MOT; 22	ATL; 7					9th	1801	
2003	N/A	52	Toyota	DAY; 34	OGL																	21st	546	
2003	N/A	14	Toyota			CLT; 4	SBO; 23	GRE		BRI; 7	ATL											21st	546	
2003	N/A	14	Pontiac						KEN; 26													21st	546	
