= Mike McConnell (racing driver) =

American racing driver

- Nationality: American
- Born: July 4, 1971 (age 55) Ballground, Georgia, U.S.

NASCAR Goody's Dash Series career
- Debut season: 1998
- Years active: 1998–2003
- Starts: 20
- Championships: 0
- Wins: 0
- Poles: 0
- Best finish: 31st in 1998
- Statistics up to date as of December 23, 2024.

Mike McConnell (born July 4, 1971) is an American former professional stock car racing driver who competed in the NASCAR Goody's Dash Series from 1998 to 2003.

McConnell has also competed in the Lucas Oil Late Model Dirt Series, the Ultimate Super Late Model Series, the Southern All Star Dirt Racing Series, and the Crate Racin' USA Dirt Late Model Series.

== Motorsports results ==
=== NASCAR ===
(key) (Bold – Pole position awarded by qualifying time. Italics – Pole position earned by points standings or practice time. * – Most laps led.)

==== Goody's Dash Series ====
NASCAR Goody's Dash Series results
Year	Team	No.	Make	1	2	3	4	5	6	7	8	9	10	11	12	13	14	15	16	17	18	19	20	NGDS	Pts	Ref
1998	N/A	61	Pontiac	DAY	HCY	CAR; DNQ	CLT	TRI; 15	LAN; 22	BRI	SUM	GRE; 14	ROU	SNM	MYB; 11	CON	HCY; 11	LAN	STA	LOU	VOL	USA	HOM	31st	666	
1999	N/A	61	Pontiac	DAY; DNQ	HCY	CAR	CLT	BRI	LOU	SUM	GRE; 23	ROU	STA	MYB; 17	HCY; 15	LAN; 8	USA	JAC	LAN					37th	467	
2000	N/A	61	Chevy	DAY	MON	STA; 18	JAC																	34th	450	
2000	N/A	61	Pontiac					CAR; DNQ	CLT; DNQ	SBO	ROU	LOU	SUM	GRE	SNM	MYB	BRI	HCY; 25	JAC	USA	LAN; 16			34th	450	
2001	N/A	61	Pontiac	DAY; 40	ROU; 7	DAR	CLT	LOU; 15	JAC	KEN	SBO	DAY	GRE	SNM	NRV	MYB	BRI	ACE	JAC	USA	NSH			47th	307	
2002	N/A	61	Pontiac	DAY; 21	HAR	ROU; 8	LON	CLT	KEN	MEM	GRE	SNM	SBO	MYB	BRI	MOT	ATL							39th	242	
2003	N/A	61	Pontiac	DAY; 11	OGL; 23	CLT; 40	SBO	GRE	KEN	BRI	ATL													35th	267	
