= Danny Snell =

American racing driver

- Nationality: American
- Born: December 20, 1953 (age 72) Harrison, Georgia, U.S.

NASCAR Goody's Dash Series career
- Debut season: 1990
- Years active: 1990–1996, 1998–1999, 2001–2003
- Starts: 60
- Championships: 0
- Wins: 0
- Poles: 0
- Best finish: 14th in 1994
- Statistics up to date as of December 19, 2024.

Danny Snell (born December 20, 1953) is an American former professional stock car racing driver who competed in the NASCAR Goody's Dash Series from 1990 to 2003.

Snell has previously competed in the IPOWER Dash Series.

== Motorsports results ==
=== NASCAR ===
(key) (Bold – Pole position awarded by qualifying time. Italics – Pole position earned by points standings or practice time. * – Most laps led.)

==== Goody's Dash Series ====
NASCAR Goody's Dash Series results
Year	Team	No.	Make	1	2	3	4	5	6	7	8	9	10	11	12	13	14	15	16	17	18	19	20	21	NGDS	Pts	Ref
1990	Snell Racing	26	Ford	DAY	NRV	AND	LAN; 25	FLO; 21	STH	SUM	LAN	BGS	HCY	CON	TRI; 18	MYB; 26	ACE	LAN	HCY						29th	273	
1991	Snell Racing	26	Ford	DAY	FIF	NRV	BGS	FLO	LAN; 21	SUM; 17	STH	LAN	BGS	HCY; 11	MYB; 20	ACE	HCY	SHO	NSV; 18						24th	554	
1992	Snell Racing	26	Ford	DAY; 18	HCY; 14	LON; 13	FLO; 14	LAN	SUM	STH	BGS; 13	MYB; 9	NRV; 21	SUM; 15	ACE; 8	HCY	VOL; 23								16th	1282	
1993	Snell Racing	26	Ford	DAY; 32	NSV	SUM; 11	VOL	MAR; 24	LON	411	LAN	HCY	SUM	FLO	BGS	MYB	NRV	HCY	VOL						32nd	288	
1994	Snell Racing	26	Ford	DAY; 23	VOL; N/A^{†}	FLO; 9	SUM; 23	CAR; 18	411; N/A^{†}	HCY; 25	LAN	BRI; 22	SUM; 9	FLO; 23	BGS; 13	MYB; 7	NRV	ASH; 26	VOL; 15	HCY					14th	1540	
1995	Snell Racing	26	Ford	DAY; 18	FLO; 18																				28th	693	
1995	Snell Racing	25	Ford			LAN; 12	MYB; 17	SUM; 13	HCY	CAR	STH	BRI	SUM	GRE	BGS	MYB	NSV	FLO	NWS	VOL	HCY	HOM			28th	693	
1996	Snell Racing	25	Ford	DAY; DNQ	HOM	MYB	SUM; 16	NSV	TRI	CAR	HCY	FLO	BRI	SUM	GRE	SNM	BGS	MYB	LAN	STH	FLO	NWS	VOL	HCY	N/A	0	
1998	Snell Racing	25	Ford	DAY; DNQ	HCY	CAR	CLT	TRI	LAN	BRI; DNQ					MYB; DNQ	CON									30th	698	
1998	Snell Racing	25	Pontiac								SUM; 12	GRE; 17	ROU	SNM			HCY; DNQ	LAN	STA	LOU	VOL; 14	USA; 16	HOM		30th	698	
1999	Snell Racing	25	Pontiac	DAY; 38	HCY	CAR	CLT	BRI; 12	LOU	SUM; 19	GRE; 22	ROU	STA; 23	MYB; 22	HCY	LAN	USA	JAC	LAN						28th	701	
2001	Snell Racing	25	Pontiac	DAY; 38	ROU	DAR	CLT; 27	LOU	JAC	KEN	SBO	DAY; 17	GRE; 24	SNM	NRV	MYB	BRI	ACE	JAC	USA	NSH				45th	334	
2002	Snell Racing	25	Pontiac	DAY	HAR	ROU	LON	CLT; 33	KEN	MEM	GRE	SNM	SBO	MYB	BRI	MOT	ATL								83rd	64	
2003	Snell Racing	25	Pontiac	DAY; DNQ	OGL; 17	CLT; 18	SBO	GRE	KEN	BRI	ATL; 11														31st	351	
^{†} - Results/participation unknown
