= David Heitzhaus =

American racing driver (born 1958)

- Nationality: American
- Born: April 23, 1958 (age 68) Strykersville, New York, U.S.

NASCAR Goody's Dash Series career
- Debut season: 1996
- Years active: 1996–2003
- Starts: 16
- Championships: 0
- Wins: 0
- Poles: 0
- Best finish: 30th in 2003
- Statistics up to date as of December 23, 2024.

David Heitzhaus (born April 23, 1958) is an American former professional stock car racing driver who competed in the NASCAR Goody's Dash Series from 1996 to 2003.

Heitzhaus has also competed in the NASCAR Busch North Series, the Mid-Atlantic Asphalt Racing Alliance, the Race of Champions Late Model Series, and the IPOWER Dash Series.

== Motorsports results ==
=== NASCAR ===
(key) (Bold – Pole position awarded by qualifying time. Italics – Pole position earned by points standings or practice time. * – Most laps led.)

==== Goody's Dash Series ====
NASCAR Goody's Dash Series results
Year	Team	No.	Make	1	2	3	4	5	6	7	8	9	10	11	12	13	14	15	16	17	18	19	20	21	NGDS	Pts	Ref
1996	Robinson Racing	18	Olds	DAY	HOM	MYB	SUM	NSV	TRI	CAR	HCY; 25	FLO	BRI	SUM	GRE	SNM	BGS	MYB	LAN	STH	FLO	NWS	VOL		N/A	0	
1996	Robinson Racing	18	Pontiac																					HCY; 26	N/A	0	
1997	Robinson Racing	18	Pontiac	DAY; DNQ	HOM	KIN	MYB	LAN	CAR	TRI	FLO	HCY	BRI; 30	GRE	SNM	CLT; 30	MYB	LAN	SUM	STA	HCY	USA	CON	HOM	65th	177	
1998	Robinson Racing	18	Pontiac	DAY; 28	HCY	CAR	CLT	TRI	LAN	BRI; 15	SUM	GRE	ROU	SNM	MYB	CON	HCY	LAN	STA	LOU	VOL	USA	HOM		65th	197	
1999	Robinson Racing	18	Pontiac	DAY; 21	HCY	CAR	CLT; 37	BRI	LOU	SUM	GRE	ROU	STA	MYB	HCY	LAN	USA	JAC	LAN						N/A	0	
2000	Robinson Racing	18	Pontiac	DAY	MON	STA	JAC	CAR	CLT; 34	SBO	ROU	LOU	SUM	GRE	SNM	MYB	BRI	HCY	JAC	USA	LAN				78th	71	
2001	Robinson Racing	18	Pontiac	DAY; 30	ROU	DAR	CLT; 12	LOU	JAC	KEN	SBO	DAY	GRE	SNM	NRV	MYB	BRI	ACE	JAC	USA	NSH				61st	200	
2002	Robinson Racing	18	Pontiac	DAY; 10	HAR	ROU	LON	CLT; 14	KEN	MEM	GRE	SNM	SBO	MYB	BRI	MOT	ATL								38th	255	
2003	N/A	45	Pontiac	DAY; 18	OGL	CLT; 3	SBO	GRE	KEN; 12	BRI	ATL														30th	401	
