= 2001 NASCAR Goody's Dash Series =

The 2001 NASCAR Goody's Dash Series was the 27th season of the NASCAR Goody's Dash Series. It began at Daytona International Speedway on February 10 and concluded at Nashville Superspeedway on November 25. Robert Huffman entered the season as the defending Drivers' Champion. Cam Strader won his first and only championship, 155 points in front of Justin Hobgood.

== Schedule ==
No.	Race title	Track	Date
1	ACDelco 200 presented by Discount Auto Parts	Daytona International Speedway, Daytona Beach, Florida	February 10
2	Coca-Cola 150	Orange County Speedway, Rougemont, North Carolina	April 28
3	Pabst Blue Ribbon 100	Darlington Raceway, Darlington, South Carolina	May 12
4	Easy Care Vehicle Service Contract 100	Lowe's Motor Speedway, Concord, North Carolina	May 25
5	Old Milwaukee 150	Louisville Motor Speedway, Louisville, Kentucky	June 2
6	United Rentals/Global Systems, Inc. 150	New River All-American Speedway, Jacksonville, North Carolina	June 9
7	Kentucky Speedway 100	Kentucky Speedway, Sparta, Kentucky	June 16
8	Goody's Liberty 150 presented by WSET TV	South Boston Speedway, South Boston, Virginia	July 3
9	DaytonaUSA.com 150	Daytona International Speedway, Daytona Beach, Florida	July 6
10	Bi-Lo/Lance Snack Foods 150	Greenville-Pickens Speedway, Greenville, South Carolina	July 14
11	Pre-Cast Concrete 150	Southern National Motorsports Park, Kenly, North Carolina	July 28
12	Old Milwaukee 150 presented by FM-94	New River Valley Speedway, Radford, Virginia	August 4
13	Piggly Wiggly 150 presented by Wesson Oil Cooking Oil and Peter Pan Peanut Butter	Myrtle Beach Speedway, Myrtle Beach, South Carolina	August 11
14	Pabst Blue Ribbon 150	Bristol Motor Speedway, Bristol, Tennessee	August 22
15	Pepsi Cola 150	Ace Speedway, Altamahaw, North Carolina	September 22
16	Goody's Dash Series, NASCAR Touring 150	New River All-American Speedway, Jacksonville, North Carolina	September 29
17	Discount Auto Parts 150 presented by Mobil 1	USA International Speedway, Lakeland, Florida	October 20
18	MBNA All American Thanksgiving Classic	Nashville Superspeedway, Lebanon, Tennessee	November 25

== Results and standings ==
=== Races ===
No.	Race	Pole position	Most laps led	Winning driver	Manufacturer
1	ACDelco 200 presented by Discount Auto Parts	Derrick Kelley	Justin Hobgood	Justin Hobgood	Pontiac
2	Coca-Cola 150	Jake Hobgood	Robert Huffman	Cam Strader	Mercury
3	Pabst Blue Ribbon 100	Cam Strader	Cam Strader	Shane Hmiel	Pontiac
4	Easy Care Vehicle Service Contract 100	Robert Huffman	Robert Huffman	Cam Strader	Mercury
5	Old Milwaukee 150	Shane Hmiel	Robert Huffman	Roger Sawyer	Pontiac
6	United Rentals/Global Systems, Inc. 150	Cam Strader	Cam Strader	Cam Strader	Mercury
7	Kentucky Speedway 100	Robert Huffman	Cam Strader	Robert Huffman	Toyota
8	Goody's Liberty 150 presented by WSET TV	Jimmy Britts	Justin Hobgood	Michael Conover	Pontiac
9	DaytonaUSA.com 150	Cam Strader	Robert Huffman	Robert Huffman	Toyota
10	Bi-Lo/Lance Snack Foods 150	Shane Hmiel	Shane Hmiel	Shane Hmiel	Pontiac
11	Pre-Cast Concrete 150	Jake Hobgood	Robert Huffman	Roger Sawyer	Pontiac
12	Old Milwaukee 150 presented by FM-94	Robert Huffman	Shane Hmiel	Robert Huffman	Toyota
13	Piggly Wiggly 150 presented by Wesson Oil Cooking Oil and Peter Pan Peanut Butter	Justin Hobgood	Jake Hobgood	Jake Hobgood	Pontiac
14	Pabst Blue Ribbon 150	Justin Hobgood	Cam Strader	Brandon Ward	Mercury
15	Pepsi Cola 150	Justin Hobgood	Jake Hobgood	Justin Hobgood	Pontiac
16	Goody's Dash Series, NASCAR Touring 150	Jake Hobgood	Shane Hmiel	Cam Strader	Mercury
17	Discount Auto Parts 150 presented by Mobil 1	Jake Hobgood	Jake Hobgood	Jake Hobgood	Pontiac
18	MBNA All American Thanksgiving Classic	Cam Strader	Cam Strader	Robert Huffman	Toyota

=== Drivers' championship ===
(key) Bold - Pole position awarded by time. Italics - Pole position set by final practice results or rainout. * – Most laps led.

Pos	Driver	DAY	ROU	DAR	CLT	LOU	JAC	KEN	SBO	DAY	GRE	SNM	NRV	MYB	BRI	ACE	JAC	USA	NSH	Points
1	Cam Strader	8	1	**2***	1	5	**1***	2*	5	**26**	21	5	3	8	2*	3	1	3	**3***	2824
2	Justin Hobgood	1*	6	4	32	7	2	23	2*	9	3	4	13	**2**	**16**	**1**	5	2	5	2669
3	Robert Huffman	6	18*	21	**28***	6*	5	**1**	3	1*	2	3*	**1**	4	22	16	3	11	1	2630
4	Jake Hobgood	32	**5**	20	10	2	3	20	4		6	**6**	2	1*	15	9*	**2**	**1***	2	2483
5	Shane Hmiel	10	9	1	21	**3**	10	29		3	**1***	9	16*	3	10	2	10*	26	4	2373
6	Larry Caudill	18	8	19	6	9	8	7	9	8	18	16	12	9	25	8	7	17	7	2336
7	Scott Weaver	4	4	27	20	12	14	26	16	21	13	8	4	12	11	14	4	7	6	2313
8	Roger Sawyer	9	2	5	11	1	7	13	7	5	8	1	22	27	17	15	19	15		2299
9	Wayne Edwards	19	17	14	8	11	13	10	12	13	10	14	10	15	20	22	16	10	15	2194
10	Joey Miller	7	26	13	5	4	6	4	14	29	5	13	9	7	21	6	15	30		2181
11	Tim Nichols	3	11	22	33	10	11	25	11	28	9	10	5	11	19	18	9	12	17	2166
12	Eric Van Cleef	17	25	7	24	8	9	24	8	32	7	17	11	10	18	13	21	24	23	2057
13	Jimmy Britts	27	23	10	3	14	17	5	**10**	25	12	11	7	6	13	4	20			2025
14	Danny Bagwell	24	24	11	13	19		11		2	4	7	8	23	24	19	18	21	11	1920
15	Scott Redmon	23	12	18	25	18	12	14	13	35	14	18	15	16	23					1514
16	Bobby Dayton	16	19	15	22	17	18	19	15	15	11	15	19	18						1462
17	Zach Brewer	34		25	7			6		4	26		6		6	5		8		1287
18	Doug Gainey	DNQ	16	17	26	13	15	17	19	22	19			21					16	1209
19	Greg Goodell	25	15	16	23				18		17	20		20	8	21	14			1205
20	Randy Humphrey	33							6	38	25	21	20	25		10	11	28	26	1070
21	Ned Combs	14		3	9			9		19					12			9	21	1033
22	Johnny Chapman	22		23	2			3		39				14	4				25	941
23	Gary Moore				DNS	20		18	22	24						11	17		14	867
24	Angie Wilson	12	14	6	35					30	16				5					799
25	Mickey York	11		26	38					6				19	3	17				785
26	Michael Conover						4		1			2		22			13			731
27	Keith Roggen	39	22		17	16								17	27			5		719
28	Charles Powell III			8	15			15									12	32	9	710
29	B. J. Mackey	5	3	12				8					17							701
30	Scott Thornton		DNQ				20		21			19		29		26	24			695
31	Mike Watts	35	21	9	16			12		16										653
32	Kelly Sutton	21	10		29					27		12						14		640
33	Brandon Ward	42			4					40			23	13	1					638
34	Brian Loftin				14			21		11					9	7				635
35	David Hutto	28												5	14			29	22	528
36	Brent Moore										23			28			6	13		447
37	Doc Brewer	36		26	18					18					26					443
38	Ricky Woodward	41		24	30					33	28								24	438
39	Roger Moser	13			37					20									8	421
40	Chuck Gafrarar																8	4	20	405
41	Derrick Kelley	2			34													6		381
42	Tony Billings		27										18			23		27		367
43	Tony Hargraves	15								12								16		360
44	William Horton		13				16		17											351
45	Danny Snell	38			27					17	24									334
46	Davis Myers						19		20		15	DNS								327
47	Mike McConnell	40	7			15														307
48	Greg Miller		20								20							33		270
49	Beau Milo															20	23	34		258
50	Matt Johnson															25	22	31		255
51	Nolan Wilson				19					10										240
52	Wally Leatherwood							16											13	239
53	Jason Roche																	20	10	237
54	Maxie Bush																	18	12	236
55	Scott Krehling	DNQ			39					31								25		229
56	Dan Shaver	DNQ			31					14										222
57	Charlie Barham															12		23		221
58	Wayne Morrow							30		42						24			27	210
59	Mike Huey												14	26						206
60	Mike Leffingwell																	22	18	206
61	David Heitzhaus	30			12															200
62	Robert Luckadoo												21	24						191
63	Mark King							28							28					158
64	Mike Swaim									7									29	146
65	Jason Boyd														7					146
66	James Trout									41									19	146
67	Monty Klein	31								36										125
68	Jeff Underwood	37								34										113
69	Bill Hennecy	DNQ								23										110
70	Scott Haller																	19		106
71	Link Kiser	20																		103
72	Renee Kopstein										22									97
73	Andy Lally	26																		85
74	Mickey Lawson										27									82
75	David Lucas		28																	79
76	Will Hobgood			29																79
77	Christian Elder	29																		76
78	Bobby Hill									36										74
79	Danny Mathis				36															55
80	Mike Gaines	DNQ																		34
81	Mark Eckard			30				22												0
82	Chris Strader							27											28	0
Pos	Driver	DAY	ROU	DAR	CLT	LOU	JAC	KEN	SBO	DAY	GRE	SNM	NRV	MYB	BRI	ACE	JAC	USA	NSH	Points

== See also ==
- 2001 NASCAR Winston Cup Series
- 2001 NASCAR Busch Series
- 2001 NASCAR Craftsman Truck Series
- 2001 ARCA Re/Max Series
