= Angie Wilson =

American racing driver

- Born: December 29, 1974 (age 51); Marion, North Carolina, U.S.

NASCAR FedEx Freight Truck Series career
- 4 races run over 1 year
- Best finish: 51st (2002)
- First race: 2002 Advance Auto Parts 250 (Martinsville)
- Last race: 2002 MBNA America 200 (Dover)
Wins	Top tens	Poles
0	0	0
- Statistics up to date as of December 20, 2024.

Angie Wilson (born December 29, 1974) is an American former professional stock car racing driver who has competed in the NASCAR Craftsman Truck Series and the NASCAR Goody's Dash Series.

== Motorsports results ==
=== NASCAR ===
(key) (Bold - Pole position awarded by qualifying time. Italics - Pole position earned by points standings or practice time. * – Most laps led.)

==== Craftsman Truck Series ====
NASCAR Craftsman Truck Series results
Year	Team	No.	Make	1	2	3	4	5	6	7	8	9	10	11	12	13	14	15	16	17	18	19	20	21	22	NCTC	Pts	Ref
2002	Ware Racing Enterprises	81	Dodge	DAY	DAR	MAR; 23	GTY; 25	PPR; 25	DOV; 34	TEX	MEM	MLW	KAN	KEN	NHA	MCH	IRP	NSH	RCH	TEX	SBO	LVS	CAL	PHO	HOM	51st	331	

==== Goody's Dash Series ====
NASCAR Goody's Dash Series results
Year	Team	No.	Make	1	2	3	4	5	6	7	8	9	10	11	12	13	14	15	16	17	18	19	20	NGDS	Pts	Ref
1998	N/A	77	Pontiac	DAY	HCY	CAR	CLT	TRI	LAN	BRI	SUM	GRE	ROU	SNM	MYB	CON	HCY; DNQ	LAN	STA	LOU	VOL	USA	HOM	92nd	52	
1999	N/A	06	Pontiac	DAY; 32	HCY; 4	CAR; 13	CLT; 34	BRI; 22	LOU; 19	SUM; 17	GRE; 16	ROU; 23	STA; 12	MYB; 5	HCY; 3	LAN; 19	USA; 18	JAC; 13	LAN; 14					12th	1843	
2000	N/A	06	Pontiac	DAY; 11	MON; 12	STA; 27	JAC; 15	CAR; 16	CLT; 41	SBO; 13	ROU; 7	LOU; 13	SUM; 12	GRE; 12	SNM; 22	MYB; 18	BRI; 23	HCY; 11	JAC; 12	USA; 11	LAN			14th	1938	
2001	N/A	06	Pontiac	DAY; 12	ROU; 14	DAR; 6	CLT; 35	LOU	JAC	KEN	SBO	DAY; 30	GRE; 16	SNM	NRV	MYB	BRI; 5	ACE	JAC	USA	NSH			24th	799	
2002	N/A	06	Pontiac	DAY; 42	HAR	ROU	LON	CLT	KEN	MEM	GRE; 17	SNM	SBO	MYB	BRI; 24	MOT	ATL							40th	240	
2003	N/A	06	Pontiac	DAY; 19	OGL	CLT; 21	SBO	GRE	KEN	BRI	ATL													39th	206	
