= Shane Hmiel =

American racing driver (born 1980)

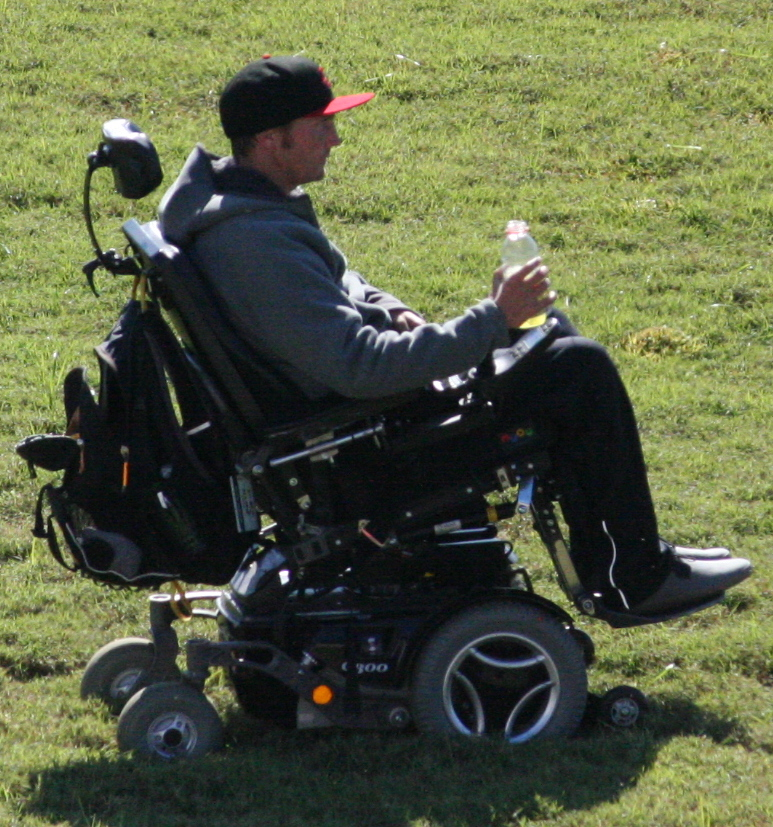
- Hmiel in 2012
- Born: Shane Riley Hmiel; May 15, 1980 (age 46); Pleasant Garden, North Carolina, U.S.
- Achievements: First driver to ever win the USAC Triple Crown in the same season (2010); 2010 Hoosier Hundred Winner; 2010 Rich Vogler Classic Winner; 2010 Pat O’Conner Memorial Winner
- Awards: 2009 USAC Most Improved Driver; 2009 Chili Bowl Rookie of the Year; 2001 NASCAR Goody's Dash Series Rookie of the Year

NASCAR Cup Series career
- 7 races run over 2 years
- Best finish: 51st (2004)
- First race: 2004 Pop Secret 500 (California)
- Last race: 2005 Food City 500 (Bristol)
Wins	Top tens	Poles
0	0	0

NASCAR O'Reilly Auto Parts Series career
- 83 races run over 4 years
- Best finish: 15th (2003)
- First race: 2002 EAS/GNC Live Well 300 (Daytona)
- Last race: 2005 Carquest Auto Parts 300 (Charlotte)
Wins	Top tens	Poles
0	23	4

NASCAR FedEx Freight Truck Series career
- 29 races run over 2 years
- Best finish: 13th (2004)
- First race: 2004 Florida Dodge Dealers 250 (Daytona)
- Last race: 2005 UAW-GM Ohio 250 (Mansfield)
- First win: 2004 Las Vegas 350 (Las Vegas)
Wins	Top tens	Poles
1	12	0
- Statistics up to date as of November 15, 2019.

Shane Riley Hmiel (pronounced: "Meal") (born May 15, 1980) is an American former racecar driver, who competed in all three of NASCAR's national series. Hmiel's controversial stock car career, marred by accidents from his aggressive driving style, ended in 2006 after he failed a third substance abuse test and was banned from competing in NASCAR for life. After rebuilding his career in open wheel racing, primarily in United States Auto Club sanctioned dirt track racing, Hmiel was paralyzed in a near fatal racing accident on October 9, 2010, in Terre Haute, Indiana. Prior to the accident, Hmiel had become the first driver to win the Hoosier Hundred, Rich Vogler Classic, and the Pat O'Connor Memorial, the three premier USAC Silver Crown races, in the same season.

== Personal life ==
Shane is the son of Lisa Hmiel and Steve Hmiel, former NASCAR crew chief and later a competition director who worked for several teams including Roush Racing, Dale Earnhardt, Inc. and Swan Racing. He also has a younger brother, Tyler Hmiel.

=== Health and drug use ===
At the age of five, Hmiel was diagnosed with attention deficit hyperactivity disorder. He began smoking cannabis at the age of twelve, and on a daily basis through his teens and twenties. Hmiel also admitted to using cocaine "about one-hundred times," and used drugs in part to medicate himself.

After entering drug rehab in 2007, Hmiel's condition was diagnosed as Bipolar II disorder.

== Racing career ==
=== Early career ===
Hmiel began racing in go-karts, winning 164 races from the age of twelve to fifteen. After quitting racing for three years, he began running late model stock cars.

=== NASCAR career ===
In 2001, Hmiel competed in the NASCAR Goody's Dash Series, earning the Rookie of the Year award with two wins and thirteen top-ten finishes, finishing fifth in points. Hmiel also ran a single ARCA Re/Max Series race at Atlanta Motor Speedway, finishing second. Hmiel also qualified the #48 Chevrolet for Innovative Motorsports in Busch Series, the second-tier national series of NASCAR, at Memphis Motorsports Park, filling in for Kenny Wallace who raced the car.

For 2002, Hmiel moved to the Busch Series in the #47 Chevrolet for Innovative as a teammate to Wallace. Initially planned to run a part-time schedule, sponsorship from Thomas Pacconi Classics, Goulds Pumps, and Mike's Hard Lemonade Co. expanded his schedule to the full season. Hmiel opened his rookie season with a fifth place finish at Daytona. That 2002 season was most notable for his feud with fellow rookie Casey Mears where he and Mears got into some incidents during the season. Despite the feud, Hmiel earned two poles (at Nashville and Loudon), two top-fives, and eight top-tens to finish 16th in points and third in Rookie of the Year standings behind Scott Riggs and Johnny Sauter.

In 2003, Hmiel moved into Innovative's #48 car. After the first 26 races of the season, he already improved on his rookie season statistics, earning four top-fives and ten top-tens, and sat eighth in points. Hmiel's best NASCAR effort came at Indianapolis Raceway Park in August 2003, where he won the pole, led the most laps and staged a very competitive battle with eventual series champion Brian Vickers. Vickers took his first career victory, while Hmiel finished fourth. In December 2009, the race was selected by media members as the greatest Nationwide Series race of the decade. Hmiel also attempted to qualify for the Pepsi 400 at Daytona in July in the Winston Cup Series for Petty Enterprises' famed No. 43 car, with normal driver Christian Fittipaldi driving Petty's No. 44 car. He did not, however make the race.

==== First failed substance abuse test ====
At the Funai 250 at Richmond International Raceway, Hmiel was involved in several on track incidents, beginning on lap 103 when he spun the lapped car of Randy MacDonald. Late in the race with five laps to go, Hmiel was involved in an accident with Jason Keller. Hmiel was moved out of line down the backstretch, then divebombed into Keller in turn three, sending Keller's car into the wall driver's side first, collecting Tim Fedewa. Hmiel was fined $5,000 and placed on probation for an altercation in the garage area after the race with Keller. Fellow competitor David Green would later identify this race as a sign of bad times to come for Hmiel.

A week later on September 18, Hmiel was suspended indefinitely for failing a drug test, testing positive for marijuana. According to NASCAR's substance abuse policy, the sanctioning body is allowed to administer drug tests, based only on "reasonable suspicion", at their sole discretion. At the time, he was the highest-profile driver to fail such a test. Hmiel was released from Innovative Motorsports, replaced with former Busch Series champion Jeff Green at Dover, then several other veteran drivers for the remainder of the season. He was set to drive the #91 car for Evernham Motorsports that weekend at Dover coming up but the team withdrew after the suspension.

==== 2004–2005: Return to competition ====
Hmiel was reinstated in 2004 after completing NASCAR's Road to Recovery program, and was picked up for the full Craftsman Truck Series season by Billy Ballew Motorsports, with crew chief Ritchie Wauters. Hmiel scored his first and only NASCAR victory at the Las Vegas 350 in September, racing hard with Todd Bodine through lapped traffic, eventually bumping Bodine out of the way coming to the white flag.

Hmiel returned to Busch Series competition at the ninth race of the season at Fontana for GIC-Mixon Motorsports, starting and finishing 32nd. After running three more races with GIC, he drove two races for Akins Motorsports' #38 Dodge, scoring a fourth-place finish at Milwaukee. In late October, Hmiel was signed to Braun Racing, replacing David Stremme in the TrimSpa X32 Dodge for the remainder of the season beginning at Atlanta Motor Speedway. He had a best finish of 22nd in four starts for Braun. Hmiel also made his Nextel Cup Series debut in September at Fontana in the #23 car for Bill Davis Racing. He ran 5 races for BDR, with a best finish of 24th at Kansas and Atlanta.

For 2005, Braun formed an alliance with Dale Earnhardt, Inc. and switched to Chevrolet. The team was also joined by new sponsor WinFuel Multivitamins, produced by TrimSpa's parent company. Hmiel was in a series of commercials with Dale Earnhardt Jr. to promote his sponsor's product. In addition to the full Busch Series schedule and a partial truck series schedule with Ballew, Braun and WinFuel fielded the #08 Chevrolet in a partial schedule in the Cup Series for Hmiel, debuting at Atlanta.

During the Sharpie 250 at Bristol in April, Hmiel was involved in a very heated incident with Cup Series veteran Dale Jarrett after Hmiel spun him out on the front stretch with three laps to go. The two were racing for 12th and 13th place, and Hmiel had bumped and ran the last three drivers he had passed before getting to Jarrett's #90 car. Later, When an angry Jarrett leaned into Hmiel's window to question why Hmiel had spun him out, Hmiel appeared to have no remorse for his driving, then flipped the middle finger toward Jarrett as the latter was walking away. The incident was captured live on Fox Sports' national television broadcast (especially the finger gesture pointed at Jarrett) through Hmiel's in-car camera. Hmiel was fined $10,000 and docked 25 points in the standings for the incident.

==== Ban from NASCAR ====
At Charlotte in May 2005, Hmiel was administered another substance test following Busch Series qualifying, after NASCAR officials observed Hmiel making "erratic moves" on the racetrack. In June at Dover, it was revealed that he had failed the test, and he was escorted from the garage by NASCAR officials. Hmiel had tested positive for marijuana and cocaine, and was suspended "indefinitely" starting in May 2005. Hmiel was offered a chance at reinstatement after his second infraction, under condition that he submit to medical and psychological reviews, and frequent drug testing before reinstatement. In February, 2006, however, Hmiel failed a third and final drug test, and was banned for life from NASCAR. He stated on WindTunnel with Dave Despain on April 4, 2010, and on several other occasions that his ban was "the best thing that's happened" to him. The ban would be partially lifted in 2012 (see below).

During his four-year NASCAR career, Hmiel appeared in seven Nextel Cup races, 83 Busch races, and 29 Truck Series races. He had one win: in the Truck Series' Las Vegas 350 in 2004.

Hmiel was not paid his 2005 salary for races prior to the suspension, as Braun Racing alleged that Hmiel signed the contract in bad faith due to health concerns, leading Hmiel to sue the team for over $135,000 in earnings and another $135,000 for "bad faith dealings" by the team. Under oath, Hmiel admitted that he violated NASCAR's substance abuse policy with a positive test for marijuana in 2003 and a positive test for marijuana and cocaine in 2005. Hmiel denied he was using drugs on a regular basis (at least once a week) in 2005. Hmiel denied that he had tested positive for heroin at any time from 2003 to 2005, and testified that he was not under the influence of any drug at any time while he was racing. The disposition of the lawsuit is unknown.

=== Driving style ===
During his stock car career, Hmiel's talent was often eclipsed by his fiery temperament, over-aggressive and impatient driving, and unsportsmanlike conduct, leading to several on-and-off track altercations with other competitors. In a 2011 interview with Fox Sports's Steve Byrnes, Hmiel admitted "I'll run you over to win the race. I'd run you over to run seventh." In addition to aforementioned incidents, Hmiel was involved in an incident at Rockingham Speedway in 2003 where he spun out Mike Wallace entering turns 1 and 2, with analyst Darrell Waltrip proclaiming on a replay that "Looking at that you'd say, Shane Hmiel just run over him." The two had a physical confrontation after leaving their cars, requiring NASCAR officials to separate the drivers. Wallace was later fined $3,000 for yelling an expletive on national television.

=== Drug rehabilitation ===
A turning point in Hmiel's life came in July 2007, when he was involved in a bar fight that led to an infection in his hand due to teeth being lodged in it. After spending 10 days in the hospital, Hmiel proceeded to check into drug rehab on July 23, 2007, at the Talbot Recover Center in Atlanta, GA. Deemed "extremely addicted", Hmiel spent 103 days at Talbot before checking out in October. During his stay, Hmiel confronted his emotional issues both on and off the track, leading to the diagnosis of bipolar disorder, as well as depression and anxiety.

=== Open-wheel racing and redemption ===
After rehabilitation from drug addiction and three-years-sober, Hmiel returned to racing in open-wheeled cars, with the goal of becoming "the next American IndyCar driver." He competed in all three national touring divisions of the United States Auto Club in the USAC Silver Crown Series, the USAC National Sprint Car Series, and the USAC National Midget Series.

In 2009, Hmiel earned his first USAC-sanctioned win in the Sprint Car division at Iowa Speedway and scored a then-career-best dirt track finish of second in the Four Crown Nationals at Eldora Speedway. Hmiel earned post-season honors as USAC's "Most Improved Driver." He was also named the Rookie of the Year in the 2009 Chili Bowl Midget Nationals in Tulsa, Oklahoma.

In 2010, Hmiel earned his first career Midget Series victory at Hickory Motor Speedway less than an hour from Mooresville, North Carolina, where he currently resides. The momentum from that victory carried on to other divisions. In the Sprint Car division, he broke the world speed record for a non-winged Sprint Car at Iowa Speedway, winning the pole with an average speed of 146.444 miles per hour. In addition to the speed record, he earned three victories, all on pavement, at O'Reilly Raceway Park at Indianapolis (twice) and Salem Speedway. In the Silver Crown division, he earned his first career series win and first dirt track win in the Hoosier Hundred race at the Indiana State Fairgrounds. During the season Hmiel became the first driver to win the Hoosier Hundred, Rich Vogler Classic, and Pat O'Connor Memorial, the three premier USAC midget-car races, in the same season.

Hmiel was slated to make his debut in the Firestone Indy Lights series (the top feeder circuit to the IndyCar Series) at Chicagoland Speedway for the Chicagoland 100 on August 28, 2010, but a back injury kept him from competing in the race.

=== Accident, paralysis, and recovery ===
While qualifying for a USAC Silver Crown race, Hmiel's car crashed at the Terre Haute Action Track on October 9, 2010. The roll cage collapsed after hitting the retaining wall. He was airlifted to Methodist Hospital with head, back, and neck injuries. Shortly after arriving, he was in critical but stable condition after having been put into a medically induced coma to minimize brain swelling. Hmiel was paralyzed as a result of his injuries; Hmiel has since regained limited use of his limbs, but continues to require the use of a wheelchair.

== Post-racing career ==
While in recovery from the aforementioned 2010 crash, Hmiel started a new USAC midget car team, partnering with former series champion Levi Jones. One year after the accident, Jones would score a victory in a car owned by Hmiel. Nearly two years after the accident, Hmiel was allowed back into a NASCAR garage for the first time since the 2006 ban, as a guest of Billy Ballew Motorsports and the crew chief, Nick Harrison (who had worked with Hmiel in the past) at Atlanta Motor Speedway, watching as Kurt Busch raced the team's No. 51 entry (in the truck Hmiel had won with in 2004) to a top-ten finish.

In January 2013, Hmiel returned to racing in a driving experience event at Rockingham Speedway, a track Hmiel had raced on during his career. The event, hosted by Accessible Racing, allowed Hmiel as well as two disabled military veterans to run laps on the track at over 100 mph in a modified Gen-4 Ford Fusion stock car.

In January 2016, Hmiel fielded a car at the Chili Bowl for Eric Saunders, a former motocross rider who had also been paralyzed in an accident.

== Motorsports career results ==
=== NASCAR ===
(key) (Bold – Pole position awarded by qualifying time. Italics – Pole position earned by points standings or practice time. * – Most laps led.)

==== Nextel Cup Series ====
NASCAR Nextel Cup Series results
Year	Team	No.	Make	1	2	3	4	5	6	7	8	9	10	11	12	13	14	15	16	17	18	19	20	21	22	23	24	25	26	27	28	29	30	31	32	33	34	35	36	NNCC	Pts	Ref
2003	Petty Enterprises	43	Dodge	DAY	CAR	LVS	ATL	DAR	BRI	TEX	TAL	MAR	CAL	RCH	CLT	DOV	POC	MCH	SON	DAY; DNQ	CHI	NHA	POC	IND	GLN	MCH	BRI	DAR	RCH	NHA	DOV	TAL	KAN	CLT	MAR	ATL	PHO	CAR	HOM	N/A	-	
2004	Bill Davis Racing	23	Dodge	DAY	CAR	LVS	ATL	DAR	BRI	TEX	MAR	TAL	CAL	RCH	CLT	DOV	POC	MCH	SON	DAY	CHI	NHA	POC	IND	GLN	MCH	BRI	CAL; 39	RCH; 29	NHA	DOV	TAL	KAN; 24	CLT	MAR	ATL; 24	PHO	DAR	HOM; 41	51st	349	
2005	Braun Racing	08	Chevy	DAY	CAL	LVS	ATL; 43	BRI; 40	MAR	TEX	PHO	TAL	DAR	RCH	CLT	DOV	POC	MCH	SON	DAY	CHI	NHA	POC	IND	GLN	MCH	BRI	CAL	RCH	NHA	DOV	TAL	KAN	CLT	MAR	ATL	TEX	PHO	HOM	74th	77	

==== Busch Series ====
NASCAR Busch Series results
Year	Team	No.	Make	1	2	3	4	5	6	7	8	9	10	11	12	13	14	15	16	17	18	19	20	21	22	23	24	25	26	27	28	29	30	31	32	33	34	35	NBSC	Pts	Ref
2002	Innovative Motorsports	47	Pontiac	DAY; 5							TAL; 21										DAY; 34																		16th	3416	
2002	Innovative Motorsports	47	Chevy		CAR; 36	LVS; 42	DAR; 19	BRI; 10	TEX; 26	**NSH**; 19		CAL; 23	RCH; 21	**NHA**; 4	NZH; 19	CLT; 31	DOV; 33	NSH; 9	KEN; 19	MLW; 6		CHI; 23	GTY; 26	PPR; 24	IRP; 39	MCH; 25	BRI; 24	DAR; 29	RCH; 28	DOV; 10	KAN; 14	CLT; 10	MEM; 11	ATL; 20	CAR; 8	PHO; 41	HOM; 16		16th	3416	
2003	Innovative Motorsports	48	Pontiac	DAY; 17						TAL; 3											DAY; 10																		15th	3160	
2003	Innovative Motorsports	48	Chevy		CAR; 35	LVS; 12	DAR; 13	BRI; 7	TEX; 3		NSH; 14	CAL; 8	RCH; 8	GTY; 13	NZH; 19	CLT; 38	DOV; 13	NSH; 34	KEN; 19	MLW; 18		CHI; 16	NHA; 15	PPR; 14	**IRP**; 4*	MCH; 9	BRI; 4	DAR; 28	RCH; 10	DOV	KAN	CLT	MEM	ATL	PHO	CAR	HOM		15th	3160	
2004	GIC-Mixon Motorsports	24	Chevy	DAY	CAR	LVS	DAR	BRI	TEX	NSH	TAL	CAL; 32	GTY; 28	RCH		CLT; 35	DOV; 41	NSH	KEN																				44th	868	
2004	Michael Waltrip Racing	99	Chevy												NZH; QL^{†}																								44th	868	
2004	Akins Motorsports	38	Dodge																	MLW; 4	DAY	CHI	NHA	PPR	IRP; 12	MCH	BRI	CAL	RCH	DOV	KAN	CLT	MEM						44th	868	
2004	Braun Racing	32	Chevy																															ATL; 34	PHO; 32	DAR; 22	HOM; 22		44th	868	
2005	Braun Racing	32	Chevy	DAY; 39	CAL; 3	MXC; 4	LVS; 36	ATL; 39	NSH; 3	BRI; 12	**TEX**; 10	PHO; 33	TAL; 43	DAR; 24	RCH; 17	CLT; 43	DOV	NSH	KEN	MLW	DAY	CHI	NHA	PPR	GTY	IRP	GLN	MCH	BRI	CAL	RCH	DOV	KAN	CLT	MEM	TEX	PHO	HOM	42nd	1228	
^{†} - Qualified for Michael Waltrip

==== Craftsman Truck Series ====
NASCAR Craftsman Truck Series results
Year	Team	No.	Make	1	2	3	4	5	6	7	8	9	10	11	12	13	14	15	16	17	18	19	20	21	22	23	24	25	NCTC	Pts	Ref
2004	Billy Ballew Motorsports	15	Chevy	DAY; 14	ATL; 6	MAR; 35	MFD; 35	CLT; 6	DOV; 23	TEX; 26	MEM; 2	MLW; 12	KAN; 26	KEN; 34	GTW; 16	MCH; 8	IRP; 6	NSH; 11	BRI; 2	RCH; 7	NHA; 20	LVS; 1	CAL; 30	TEX; 10	MAR; 24	PHO; 4	DAR; 33	HOM; 27	13th	2954	
2005	Billy Ballew Motorsports	15	Chevy	DAY	CAL	ATL; 32	MAR; 6	GTY; 14	MFD; 3	CLT	DOV	TEX	MCH	MLW	KAN	KEN	MEM	IRP	NSH	BRI	RCH	NHA	LVS	MAR	ATL	TEX	PHO	HOM	42nd	513	

==== Goody's Dash Series ====
NASCAR Goody's Dash Series results
Year	Team	No.	Make	1	2	3	4	5	6	7	8	9	10	11	12	13	14	15	16	17	18	NGDS	Pts	Ref
1999	Steve Hmiel	77	Pontiac	DAY	HCY; 22	CAR; 22	CLT	BRI	LOU	SUM	GRE	ROU	STA	MYB	HCY	LAN	USA	JAC	LAN			49th	261	
2000	N/A	26	Pontiac	DAY	MON	STA	JAC	CAR	CLT	SBO	ROU	LOU	SUM	GRE; 6	SNM; 27	MYB; 15	BRI; 5	HCY; 24	JAC	USA	LAN	30th	596	
2001	N/A	26	Pontiac	DAY; 10	ROU; 9	DAR; 1	CLT; 21	**LOU**; 3	JAC; 10	KEN; 29	SBO	DAY; 3	**GRE**; 1*	SNM; 9	NRV; 16*	MYB; 3	BRI; 10	ACE; 2	JAC; 10*	USA; 26	NSH; 4	5th	2373	
2002	N/A	26	Pontiac	DAY	HAR	ROU	LON	CLT	KEN	MEM	GRE	SNM	SBO	MYB; 6	BRI	MOT	ATL					58th	150	
