= Justin Hobgood =

American racing driver (born 1979)

- Born: July 31, 1979 (age 47); Winnsboro, South Carolina, U.S.

NASCAR O'Reilly Auto Parts Series career
- 15 races run over 3 years
- Best finish: 65th (2008)
- First race: 2003 Sam's Town 250 (Memphis)
- Last race: 2009 Kroger On Track for the Cure 250 (Memphis)
Wins	Top tens	Poles
0	0	0

NASCAR FedEx Freight Truck Series career
- 11 races run over 5 years
- Best finish: 64th (2009)
- First race: 2005 Cheerios Betty Crocker 200 (Richmond)
- Last race: 2010 Mountain Dew 250 (Talladega)
Wins	Top tens	Poles
0	1	0
- Statistics up to date as of June 26, 2018.

Justin Hobgood (born July 31, 1979) is an American stock car racing driver in the NASCAR Nationwide Series and Camping World Truck Series. Hobgood drove the No. 91 Chevy Monte Carlo part-time for MSRP Motorsports, a start and park team in the Nationwide series. His career best finish (27th) came in his first start in the 2003 Sam's Town 250 on October 18. He has made a handful of starts in 2003, 2008 and 2009 in the Nationwide Series. He also has a few truck starts; his best finish and first ever NASCAR top-ten came at Talladega Superspeedway in the fall where he ended up ninth in a wild race.

Hobgood has also competed in the NASCAR Goody's Dash Series, where he won seven races between 1997 and 2003. He is the son of former series champion Will Hobgood, and the brother of Jake Hobgood, who also competed in the series.

== Motorsports career results ==
=== NASCAR ===
(key) (Bold – Pole position awarded by qualifying time. Italics – Pole position earned by points standings or practice time. * – Most laps led.)

==== Nationwide Series ====
NASCAR Nationwide Series results
Year	Team	No.	Make	1	2	3	4	5	6	7	8	9	10	11	12	13	14	15	16	17	18	19	20	21	22	23	24	25	26	27	28	29	30	31	32	33	34	35	NNSC	Pts	Ref
2003	Brewco Motorsports	43	Chevy	DAY	CAR	LVS	DAR	BRI	TEX	TAL	NSH	CAL	RCH	GTY	NZH	CLT	DOV	NSH	KEN	MLW	DAY	CHI	NHA	PPR	IRP	MCH	BRI	DAR	RCH	DOV	KAN	CLT	MEM; 27	ATL	PHO				132nd	82	
2003	Montgomery Motorsports	80	Pontiac																																	CAR; DNQ	HOM		132nd	82	
2008	MSRP Motorsports	91	Chevy	DAY	CAL	LVS	ATL	BRI	NSH	TEX	PHO	MXC	TAL	RCH	DAR	CLT	DOV	NSH; 41	KEN; 38	MLW	NHA; DNQ	DAY; DNQ	CHI; DNQ	GTY; 39	IRP	CGV	GLN	MCH; 40	BRI; 43	CAL; 38	RCH; 41	DOV; 42	KAN; 42	CLT	MEM; 40	TEX; DNQ	PHO; 41	HOM	65th	458	
2009	MSRP Motorsports	91	Chevy	DAY	CAL	LVS	BRI	TEX	NSH	PHO	TAL; DNQ	RCH																		RCH; 39	DOV	KAN	CAL	CLT	MEM; 41	TEX	PHO	HOM	118th	126	
2009	Rick Ware Racing	41	Chevy										DAR; DNQ	CLT	DOV	NSH; DNQ	KEN; 41	MLW	NHA; DNQ	DAY	CHI	GTY	IRP	IOW	GLN	MCH	BRI	CGV	ATL										118th	126	

==== Camping World Truck Series ====
NASCAR Camping World Truck Series results
Year	Team	No.	Make	1	2	3	4	5	6	7	8	9	10	11	12	13	14	15	16	17	18	19	20	21	22	23	24	25	NCWTC	Pts	Ref
2005	Germain-Arnold Racing	9	Toyota	DAY	CAL	ATL	MAR	GTY	MFD	CLT	DOV	TEX	MCH	MLW	KAN	KEN	MEM	IRP	NSH	BRI	RCH; 23	NHA	LVS	MAR	ATL; DNQ	TEX; DNQ	PHO; 20	HOM; 35	69th	152	
2007	Germain Racing	03	Toyota	DAY	CAL	ATL	MAR	KAN	CLT; 36	MFD	DOV	TEX	MCH	MLW	MEM	KEN	IRP	NSH	BRI	GTW	NHA	LVS	TAL	MAR	ATL	TEX	PHO	HOM	114th	55	
2008	William Bishop Motorsports	53	Chevy	DAY; 20	CAL	ATL	MAR	KAN	CLT	MFD	DOV	TEX	MCH	MLW	MEM	KEN	IRP	NSH	BRI	GTW	NHA	LVS	TAL; 33	MAR	ATL	TEX	PHO	HOM	66th	167	
2009	William Bishop Motorsports	53	Chevy	DAY; 28	CAL	ATL	MAR	KAN	CLT	DOV	TEX	MCH	MLW	MEM	KEN	IRP	NSH	BRI	CHI	IOW	GTW	NHA	LVS	MAR	TAL; 9	TEX	PHO	HOM	64th	217	
2010	William Bishop Motorsports	53	Chevy	DAY; DNQ	ATL	MAR	NSH	KAN	DOV	CLT	TEX	MCH	IOW	GTW	IRP	POC	NSH								TAL; 16	TEX	PHO	HOM	78th	173	
2010	Rick Ware Racing	16	Chevy															DAR; 34	BRI; DNQ	CHI	KEN	NHA							78th	173	
2010	Germain Racing	9	Toyota																				LVS; 35	MAR					78th	173	

==== Goody's Dash Series ====
NASCAR Goody's Dash Series results
Year	Team	No.	Make	1	2	3	4	5	6	7	8	9	10	11	12	13	14	15	16	17	18	19	20	21	NGDS	Pts	Ref
1997	CB Racing	50	Pontiac	DAY	HOM	KIN	MYB	LAN	CAR	TRI	FLO	HCY	BRI	GRE	SNM	CLT	MYB	LAN	SUM; 22	STA	HCY	USA	CON; DNQ	HOM	67th	161	
1998	Will Hobgood	65	Pontiac	DAY	HCY	CAR	CLT	TRI	LAN	BRI	SUM; 19	GRE; 5	ROU; 20	SNM	MYB; 29	CON; 22	HCY	LAN	STA	LOU	VOL	USA	HOM		39th	537	
1999	Will Hobgood	65	Pontiac	DAY; 28	HCY; DNQ	CAR; 7	CLT; 23	BRI; 21	LOU; 3	SUM; 8	GRE; 25	ROU; 5	STA; 10	MYB; 29	HCY; 9	LAN; 5	USA; 2	JAC; 2	LAN; 12						8th	2006	
2000	Will Hobgood	65	Pontiac	DAY; 27	MON; 6	STA; 1*	JAC; 27	CAR; 27	CLT; 31	SBO; 5	ROU; 19	LOU; 7	SUM; 1**	GRE; 19	SNM; 6	MYB; 3	BRI; 27	HCY; 19	JAC; 6	USA; 27	LAN; 4				11th	2234	
2001	Will Hobgood	65	Pontiac	DAY; 1*	ROU; 6	DAR; 4	CLT; 32	LOU; 7	JAC; 2	KEN; 23	SBO; 2*	DAY; 9	GRE; 3	SNM; 4	NRV; 13	MYB; 2	BRI; 16	**ACE**; 1	JAC; 5	USA; 2	NSH; 5				2nd	2669	
2002	Will Hobgood	65	Pontiac	DAY; 5*	HAR; 16	ROU; 1	**LON**; 6	**CLT**; 2	KEN; 10	MEM; 18	GRE; 13	**SNM**; 2	**SBO**; 1*	MYB; 3	BRI; 13	MOT; 1*	**ATL**; 4								3rd	2116	
2003	Will Hobgood	65	Pontiac	DAY; 7	OGL; 2	CLT; 7	SBO; 2	GRE; 11	KEN; 2	BRI; 23	ATL; 1														2nd	1206	

=== ARCA Re/Max Series ===
(key) (Bold – Pole position awarded by qualifying time. Italics – Pole position earned by points standings or practice time. * – Most laps led.)

ARCA Re/Max Series results
Year	Team	No.	Make	1	2	3	4	5	6	7	8	9	10	11	12	13	14	15	16	17	18	19	20	21	22	ARSC	Pts	Ref
2004	Germain/Arnold Racing	50	Dodge	DAY	NSH	SLM	KEN	TOL	CLT; 2	KAN	POC	**MCH**; 39	SBO	BLN	KEN; 40	GTW	POC	LER	NSH	ISF	TOL	DSF	CHI	SLM	TAL	83rd	305	

=== CARS Late Model Stock Car Tour ===
(key) (Bold – Pole position awarded by qualifying time. Italics – Pole position earned by points standings or practice time. * – Most laps led. ** – All laps led.)

CARS Late Model Stock Car Tour results
Year	Team	No.	Make	1	2	3	4	5	6	7	8	9	10	CLMSCTC	Pts	Ref
2015	Wesley Hawkins	20	N/A	SNM	ROU	HCY	SNM	TCM	MMS	ROU	CON; 5	MYB	HCY; 22	32nd	39	
