= Michael Conover =

American racing driver

- Nationality: American
- Born: Greenville, North Carolina, U.S.

NASCAR Goody's Dash Series career
- Debut season: 2000
- Years active: 2000–2002
- Starts: 8
- Championships: 0
- Wins: 1
- Poles: 0
- Best finish: 26th in 2001
- Statistics up to date as of December 26, 2024.

Michael Conover (birth date unknown) is an American former professional stock car racing driver who competed in the NASCAR Goody's Dash Series from 2000 to 2002.

Conover also competed in the NASCAR Advance Auto Parts Weekly Series.

== Motorsports results ==
=== NASCAR ===
(key) (Bold – Pole position awarded by qualifying time. Italics – Pole position earned by points standings or practice time. * – Most laps led.)

==== Goody's Dash Series ====
NASCAR Goody's Dash Series results
Year	Team	No.	Make	1	2	3	4	5	6	7	8	9	10	11	12	13	14	15	16	17	18	NGDS	Pts	Ref
2000	Conover Motorsports	96	Pontiac	DAY	MON	STA	JAC	CAR	CLT	SBO	ROU	LOU	SUM	GRE	SNM; 26	MYB	BRI	HCY	JAC; 11	USA	LAN	47th	215	
2001	Conover Motorsports	96	Pontiac	DAY	ROU	DAR	CLT	LOU	JAC; 4	KEN	SBO; 1	DAY	GRE	SNM; 2	NRV	MYB; 22	BRI	ACE	JAC; 13	USA	NSH	26th	731	
2002	Conover Motorsports	96	Pontiac	DAY	HAR	ROU	LON	CLT	KEN	MEM	GRE	SNM	SBO; 19	MYB	BRI	MOT	ATL					69th	106	
