= Doc Brewer =

American racing driver

- Nationality: American
- Born: High Point, North Carolina, U.S.

NASCAR Goody's Dash Series career
- Debut season: 1996
- Years active: 1996–2003
- Starts: 67
- Championships: 0
- Wins: 0
- Poles: 0
- Best finish: 8th in 1998
- Statistics up to date as of December 23, 2024.

Tom "Doc" Brewer is an American former professional stock car racing driver who competed in the NASCAR Goody's Dash Series from 1996 to 2003.

Brewer also competed in the IPOWER Dash Series.

== Motorsports results ==
=== NASCAR ===
(key) (Bold – Pole position awarded by qualifying time. Italics – Pole position earned by points standings or practice time. * – Most laps led.)

==== Goody's Dash Series ====
NASCAR Goody's Dash Series results
Year	Team	No.	Make	1	2	3	4	5	6	7	8	9	10	11	12	13	14	15	16	17	18	19	20	21	NGDS	Pts	Ref
1996	N/A	44	Pontiac	DAY	HOM	MYB	SUM	NSV	TRI	CAR	HCY	FLO	BRI	SUM; 16	GRE	SNM; 24	BGS	MYB; 22	LAN	STH	FLO	NWS; 25	VOL	HCY; 11	39th	521	
1997	N/A	44	Pontiac	DAY; 39	HOM; 24	KIN; 5	MYB; 22	LAN; 20	CAR; 10	TRI; 5	FLO; 16	HCY; 20	BRI; 24	GRE; 19	SNM; 20	CLT; 16	MYB; 20	LAN; 10	SUM; 9	STA; 11	HCY; 11	USA; 11	CON; 7	HOM; 14	11th	2446	
1998	N/A	44	Pontiac	DAY; 3	HCY; 20	CAR; 16	CLT; 4	TRI; 12	LAN; 16	BRI; 4	SUM; 13	GRE; 25	ROU; 9	SNM; 16	MYB; 27		HCY; 24	LAN; 12	STA; 7	LOU; 11	VOL; 12	USA; 11	HOM; 14		8th	2519	
1998	N/A	11	Pontiac													CON; 5									8th	2519	
1999	N/A	44	Pontiac	DAY; 14	HCY	CAR	CLT; 12	BRI; 16	LOU	SUM	GRE	ROU	STA	MYB; 28	HCY	LAN	USA; 30	JAC	LAN						34th	515	
2000	N/A	44	Pontiac	DAY; 24	MON	STA	JAC	CAR	CLT; 9	SBO	ROU	LOU	SUM	GRE	SNM	MYB; 16	BRI; 16	HCY	JAC	USA; 18	LAN				31st	568	
2001	N/A	44	Pontiac	DAY; 36	ROU	DAR; 26	CLT; 18	LOU	JAC	KEN	SBO	DAY; 18	GRE	SNM	NRV	MYB	BRI; 26	ACE	JAC	USA	NSH				37th	443	
2002	N/A	44	Pontiac	DAY; 19	HAR	ROU	LON	CLT; 35	KEN	MEM	GRE	SNM; 15	SBO	MYB	BRI; 27	MOT	ATL								31st	440	
2003	N/A	21	Pontiac	DAY; 35	OGL																				55th	98	
2003	N/A	44	Pontiac			CLT; 41	SBO	GRE	KEN	BRI	ATL														55th	98	
