= Greg Goodell =

American racing driver (born 1971)

- Nationality: American
- Born: October 25, 1971 (age 55) Easley, South Carolina, U.S.

NASCAR Goody's Dash Series career
- Debut season: 1996
- Years active: 1996–2003
- Starts: 67
- Championships: 0
- Wins: 0
- Poles: 0
- Best finish: 15th in 2000, 2003
- Statistics up to date as of December 19, 2024.

Greg Goodell (born October 25, 1971) is an American former professional stock car racing driver who competed in the NASCAR Goody's Dash Series from 1996 to 2003.

== Motorsports results ==
=== NASCAR ===
(key) (Bold – Pole position awarded by qualifying time. Italics – Pole position earned by points standings or practice time. * – Most laps led.)

==== Goody's Dash Series ====
NASCAR Goody's Dash Series results
Year	Team	No.	Make	1	2	3	4	5	6	7	8	9	10	11	12	13	14	15	16	17	18	19	20	21	NGDS	Pts	Ref
1996	Goodell Racing	95	Pontiac	DAY	HOM	MYB	SUM	NSV	TRI; 22	CAR	HCY	FLO	BRI	SUM	GRE; 18	SNM	BGS	MYB	LAN	STH	FLO; 17	NWS	VOL	HCY	N/A	0	
1997	Goodell Racing	95	Pontiac	DAY	HOM	KIN	MYB	LAN	CAR	TRI	FLO	HCY	BRI	GRE	SNM	CLT	MYB	LAN	SUM; 15	STA; 20	HCY	USA; 35	CON	HOM	54th	279	
1998	Goodell Racing	95	Pontiac	DAY; DNQ	HCY; DNQ	CAR; DNQ	CLT; 24	TRI; 20	LAN; 18	BRI; 14	SUM	GRE; 19	ROU	SNM; 14	MYB; 19	CON; 13	HCY; 13	LAN	STA; 18	LOU	VOL; 11	USA; 18	HOM		16th	1503	
1999	Goodell Racing	95	Pontiac	DAY; 4	HCY; DNQ	CAR; 23	CLT; 31	BRI; 17	LOU	SUM	GRE; 18	ROU; 15	STA	MYB; DNQ	HCY; 17	LAN; 21	USA; 26	JAC	LAN						21st	1085	
2000	Goodell Racing	95	Pontiac	DAY; 19	MON; 17	STA; 28	JAC; 22	CAR; 20	CLT; 27	SBO; 29	ROU; 9	LOU; 16	SUM; 21	GRE; 17	SNM; 12	MYB; 19	BRI; 6	HCY; 17	JAC; 18	USA; 19	LAN; 20				15th	1933	
2001	Goodell Racing	95	Pontiac	DAY; 25	ROU; 15	DAR; 16	CLT; 23	LOU	JAC	KEN	SBO; 18	DAY	GRE; 17	SNM; 20	NRV	MYB; 20	BRI; 8	ACE; 21	JAC; 14	USA	NSH				19th	1205	
2002	Goodell Racing	95	Pontiac	DAY	HAR; 11	ROU; 12	LON	CLT; 19	KEN	MEM	GRE; 27	SNM	SBO	MYB	BRI; DNQ	MOT	ATL								28th	515	
2003	Goodell Racing	95	Pontiac	DAY; 13	OGL; 19	CLT; 16	SBO; 20	GRE; 22	KEN; 13	BRI; 20	ATL														15th	772	
