= Roger Sawyer =

American racing driver

- Born: May 30, 1966 (age 60); Chesapeake, Virginia, U.S.

NASCAR O'Reilly Auto Parts Series career
- 1 race run over 1 year
- Best finish: 84th (1993)
- First race: 1993 Miller 500 (Martinsville)
| Wins | Top tens | Poles |
|---|---|---|
| 0 | 0 | 0 |
- Statistics up to date as of December 13, 2024.

Roger Sawyer (born May 30, 1966) is an American former professional stock car racing driver who has competed in the NASCAR Busch Series and the NASCAR Goody's Dash Series. He is the younger brother of former racing driver Elton Sawyer, who is currently the senior vice president of competition of NASCAR.

Sawyer has also previously competed in the IPOWER Dash Series, and was a frequent competitor at Langley Speedway.

== Motorsports results ==
=== NASCAR ===
(key) (Bold - Pole position awarded by qualifying time. Italics - Pole position earned by points standings or practice time. * – Most laps led.)

==== Busch Series ====
NASCAR Busch Series results
| Year | Team | No. | Make | 1 | 2 | 3 | 4 | 5 | 6 | 7 | 8 | 9 | 10 | 11 | 12 | 13 | 14 | 15 | 16 | 17 | 18 | 19 | 20 | 21 | 22 | 23 | 24 | 25 | 26 | 27 | 28 | NBSC | Pts | Ref |
|---|---|---|---|---|---|---|---|---|---|---|---|---|---|---|---|---|---|---|---|---|---|---|---|---|---|---|---|---|---|---|---|---|---|---|
| 1993 | Key Motorsports | 05 | Chevy | DAY | CAR | RCH | DAR | BRI | HCY | ROU | MAR; 14 | NZH | CLT | DOV | MYB | GLN | MLW | TAL | IRP | MCH | NHA | BRI | DAR | RCH | DOV | ROU | CLT | MAR | CAR | HCY | ATL | 84th | 121 | |

==== Goody's Dash Series ====
NASCAR Goody's Dash Series results
| Year | Team | No. | Make | 1 | 2 | 3 | 4 | 5 | 6 | 7 | 8 | 9 | 10 | 11 | 12 | 13 | 14 | 15 | 16 | 17 | 18 | NGDS | Pts | Ref |
|---|---|---|---|---|---|---|---|---|---|---|---|---|---|---|---|---|---|---|---|---|---|---|---|---|
| 1999 | Sawyer Racing | 38 | Pontiac | DAY; 19 | HCY; 11 | CAR; 20 | CLT; 7 | BRI; 11 | LOU; 7 | SUM; 12 | GRE; 8 | ROU; 11 | STA; 19 | MYB; 10 | HCY; 5 | LAN; 7 | USA; 12 | JAC; 17 | LAN; 5 | | | 7th | 2095 | |
| 2000 | Sawyer Racing | 38 | Pontiac | DAY; 6 | MON; 13 | STA; 6 | JAC; 7 | CAR; 7 | CLT; 21 | SBO; 2 | ROU; 4 | LOU; 4 | SUM; 8 | GRE; 24 | SNM; 17 | MYB; 6 | BRI; 1 | HCY; 3 | JAC; 4 | USA; 30 | LAN; 11 | 4th | 2509 | |
| 2001 | Sawyer Racing | 38 | Pontiac | DAY; 9 | ROU; 2 | DAR; 5 | CLT; 11 | LOU; 1 | JAC; 7 | KEN; 13 | SBO; 7 | DAY; 5 | GRE; 8 | SNM; 1 | NRV; 22 | MYB; 27 | BRI; 17 | ACE; 15 | JAC; 19 | USA; 15 | NSH | 8th | 2299 | |
| 2002 | Sawyer Racing | 38 | Pontiac | DAY; 22 | HAR | ROU | LON | CLT | KEN | MEM | GRE; 10 | SNM | SBO | MYB | BRI | MOT | ATL | | | | | 43rd | 231 | |
