= Scott Krehling =

American racing driver

- Nationality: American
- Born: February 5, 1964 (age 62) Naples, Florida, U.S.

NASCAR Goody's Dash Series career
- Debut season: 1998
- Years active: 1998–2003
- Starts: 22
- Championships: 0
- Wins: 0
- Poles: 0
- Best finish: 23rd in 2003
- Statistics up to date as of December 21, 2024.

Scott Krehling (born February 5, 1964) is an American former professional stock car racing driver who competed in the NASCAR Goody's Dash Series from 1998 to 2003.

Krehling has previously competed in the IPOWER Dash Series, the ISCARS Dash Touring Series, the FASCAR Goodyear Challenge Series, and the USAR Sportsman Series.

== Motorsports results ==
=== NASCAR ===
(key) (Bold – Pole position awarded by qualifying time. Italics – Pole position earned by points standings or practice time. * – Most laps led.)

==== Goody's Dash Series ====
NASCAR Goody's Dash Series results
Year	Team	No.	Make	1	2	3	4	5	6	7	8	9	10	11	12	13	14	15	16	17	18	19	20	NGDS	Pts	Ref
1998	Krehling Racing	39	Pontiac	DAY	HCY	CAR	CLT; 25	TRI	LAN	BRI; DNQ	SUM	GRE	ROU	SNM	MYB	CON	HCY	LAN	STA; 25	LOU	VOL	USA; DNQ	HOM; 27	52nd	359	
1999	Krehling Racing	39	Pontiac	DAY; 27	HCY	CAR	CLT; 41	BRI	LOU	SUM	GRE	ROU	STA	MYB	HCY	LAN	USA; 33	JAC	LAN					N/A	0	
2000	Krehling Racing	1	Pontiac	DAY; 26	MON	STA; DNQ	JAC	CAR	CLT; 35	SBO	ROU	LOU	SUM	GRE	SNM	MYB	BRI	HCY	JAC	USA; 23	LAN			42nd	313	
2001	Krehling Racing	1	Pontiac	DAY; DNQ	ROU	DAR	CLT; 39	LOU	JAC	KEN	SBO	DAY; 31	GRE	SNM	NRV	MYB	BRI	ACE	JAC	USA; 25	NSH			55th	229	
2002	Krehling Racing	1	Pontiac	DAY; 30	HAR	ROU	LON																	25th	623	
2002	Krehling Racing	1	Toyota					CLT; 24	KEN; 9	MEM	GRE	SNM; 12	SBO	MYB	BRI; DNQ	MOT	ATL; 11							25th	623	
2003	Krehling Racing	1	Toyota	DAY; 4		CLT; 42	SBO	GRE		BRI; 32	ATL													23rd	498	
2003	Krehling Racing	1	Pontiac		OGL; 10				KEN; 21															23rd	498	
