= Scott Haller =

American racing driver

- Nationality: American
- Born: July 19, 1984 (age 42) Bethlehem, Pennsylvania, U.S.

NASCAR Goody's Dash Series career
- Debut season: 2001
- Years active: 2001–2003
- Starts: 11
- Championships: 0
- Wins: 0
- Poles: 0
- Best finish: 24th in 2002
- Statistics up to date as of December 23, 2024.

Scott Haller (born July 19, 1984) is an American former professional stock car racing driver who competed in the NASCAR Goody's Dash Series from 2001 to 2003.

== Motorsports results ==
=== NASCAR ===
(key) (Bold – Pole position awarded by qualifying time. Italics – Pole position earned by points standings or practice time. * – Most laps led.)

==== Goody's Dash Series ====
NASCAR Goody's Dash Series results
| Year | Team | No. | Make | 1 | 2 | 3 | 4 | 5 | 6 | 7 | 8 | 9 | 10 | 11 | 12 | 13 | 14 | 15 | 16 | 17 | 18 | NGDS | Pts | Ref |
|---|---|---|---|---|---|---|---|---|---|---|---|---|---|---|---|---|---|---|---|---|---|---|---|---|
| 2001 | Bryant Motorsports | 5 | Pontiac | DAY | ROU | DAR | CLT | LOU | JAC | KEN | SBO | DAY | GRE | SNM | NRV | MYB | BRI | ACE | JAC | USA; 19 | NSH | 70th | 106 | |
| 2002 | Bryant-Granelli Motorsports | 5 | Pontiac | DAY | HAR | ROU | LON | CLT | KEN | MEM | GRE | SNM; 17 | SBO; 16 | MYB; 10 | BRI | MOT; 11 | ATL; 9 | | | | | 24th | 629 | |
| 2003 | Bryant-Granelli Motorsports | 5 | Pontiac | DAY; 38 | OGL; 15 | CLT; DNQ | SBO; 13 | GRE; 23 | | | | | | | | | | | | | | 25th | 476 | |
| 2003 | N/A | 39 | Pontiac | | | | | | KEN; 31 | BRI | ATL | | | | | | | | | | | 25th | 476 | |
