= Johnny Chapman =

American stock car racing driver

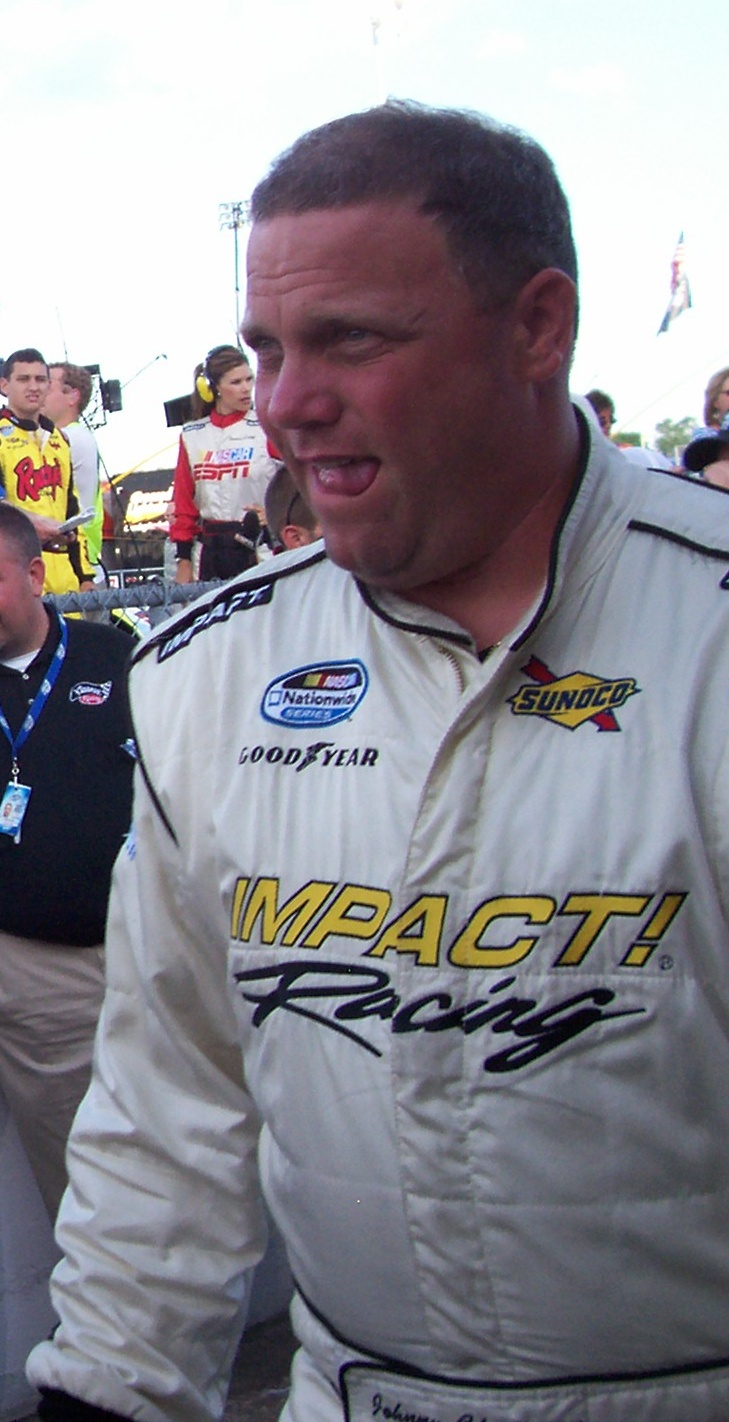
- Chapman at the Milwaukee Mile in 2009
- Born: Johnny Dale Chapman; December 14, 1967 (age 58); Statesville, North Carolina, U.S.
- Achievements: 1991, 2004 Goody's Dash Series Champion

NASCAR Cup Series career
- 1 race run over 1 year
- Best finish: 81st (1993)
- First race: 1993 GM Goodwrench 500 (The Rock)
Wins	Top tens	Poles
0	0	0

NASCAR O'Reilly Auto Parts Series career
- 117 races run over 9 years
- Best finish: 25th (1997)
- First race: 1994 Advance Auto 500 (Martinsville)
- Last race: 2011 WYPALL* 200 (Phoenix)
Wins	Top tens	Poles
0	0	0

NASCAR FedEx Freight Truck Series career
- 60 races run over 13 years
- 2013 position: 72nd
- Best finish: 39th (2012)
- First race: 1996 Ford Dealers 225 (Louisville)
- Last race: 2013 WinStar World Casino 400K (Texas)
Wins	Top tens	Poles
0	0	0
- Statistics up to date as of June 7, 2013.

Johnny Dale Chapman (born December 14, 1967) is an American former professional stock car racing driver.

== Racing career ==
Chapman has won forty races in NASCAR's Late Model Stock Division as well as being a two-time Goody's Dash Series Champion on his way up the rankings in the late 1980s and early 1990s. In 1997, after running a few one-off races he signed a contract to run the No. 89 Sherwin-Williams Ford in the NASCAR Busch Series. He had three top fifteen finishes that year, including his best major NASCAR finish of eleventh in the Winston Motorsports 300 on June 13.

Chapman's career died down for a while as he ran a handful of races in the next few years in the NASCAR Nationwide Series and NASCAR Camping World Truck Series. Chapman has run one NASCAR Cup Series race, which came in 1993 in the No. 64 Bahre Racing Pontiac. He finished 36th.

In 2008 and 2009, he drove full-time in the No. 90 Chevrolet for MSRP Motorsports, a start and park team in the Nationwide Series. He also started and parked for GunBroker Racing, Wyler Racing, and SS-Green Light Racing in select Camping World Truck Series races.

For 2010, Chapman has been tabbed by K-Automotive Motorsports to drive their No. 92 Dodge in the Nationwide Series. Along with Dennis Setzer in the No. 96, he started and parked to help fund the No. 26 of Brian Keselowski. After briefly driving Morgan Shepherd's No. 89 Chevrolet in 2010, he raced for Fleur-de-lis Motorsports at Texas.

In 2011, Chapman drove a Nationwide car for Rick Ware Racing as a start and park operation to support Ware's other Nationwide cars. He also drove a few races for SS-Green Light Racing in the No. 07 truck. Chapman primarily made his living as a start-and-park driver for underfunded and unsponsored teams and last ran a NASCAR-sanctioned race in 2013.

== Personal life ==
Chapman is married and has two children.

== Motorsports career results ==
=== NASCAR ===
(key) (Bold – Pole position awarded by qualifying time. Italics – Pole position earned by points standings or practice time. * – Most laps led.)

==== Winston Cup Series ====
NASCAR Winston Cup Series results
Year	Team	No.	Make	1	2	3	4	5	6	7	8	9	10	11	12	13	14	15	16	17	18	19	20	21	22	23	24	25	26	27	28	29	30	31	NWCC	Pts	Ref
1993	Bahre Racing	64	Pontiac	DAY	CAR; 36	RCH	ATL	DAR	BRI	NWS	MAR	TAL	SON																						81st	55	
1993	Bahre Racing	64	Chevy											CLT; DNQ	DOV	POC	MCH	DAY	NHA	POC	TAL	GLN	MCH	BRI	DAR	RCH	DOV	MAR	NWS	CLT	CAR	PHO	ATL		81st	55	
1995	RaDiUs Motorsports	76	Ford	DAY	CAR	RCH	ATL; DNQ	DAR	BRI	NWS	MAR	TAL	SON																						NA	-	
1995	RaDiUs Motorsports	67	Ford											CLT; DNQ	DOV	POC	MCH	DAY	NHA	POC	TAL	IND	GLN	MCH	BRI	DAR	RCH	DOV	MAR	NWS	CLT	CAR	PHO	ATL	NA	-	

==== Nationwide Series ====
NASCAR Nationwide Series results
Year	Team	No.	Make	1	2	3	4	5	6	7	8	9	10	11	12	13	14	15	16	17	18	19	20	21	22	23	24	25	26	27	28	29	30	31	32	33	34	35	NNSC	Pts	Ref
1994			Chevy	DAY	CAR	RCH	ATL	MAR	DAR	HCY	BRI	ROU	NHA	NZH	CLT; DNQ	DOV	MYB	GLN	MLW	SBO	TAL																		84th	94	
1994			Buick																			HCY; DNQ	IRP	MCH	BRI	DAR	RCH	DOV	CLT										84th	94	
1994	Douglas Motorsports	17	Pontiac																											MAR; 23	CAR								84th	94	
1995	Douglas Motorsports	70	Pontiac	DAY	CAR	RCH	ATL	NSV	DAR	BRI	HCY	NHA	NZH	CLT	DOV	MYB; 26	GLN	MLW	TAL	SBO; 29	IRP	MCH	BRI	DAR	RCH	DOV	CLT												63rd	280	
1995	RaDiUs Motorsports	66	Ford																									CAR; 37	HOM; 32										63rd	280	
1996	RaDiUs Motorsports	55	Ford	DAY; 13	CAR; 22	RCH; 40	ATL; 20	NSV	DAR	BRI																													55th	464	
1996	RaDiUs Motorsports	55	Pontiac								HCY; 22	NZH	CLT	DOV	SBO	MYB	GLN	MLW	NHA	TAL	IRP	MCH	BRI	DAR	RCH	DOV	CLT	CAR	HOM										55th	464	
1997	NorthStar Motorsports	89	Ford	DAY; 23	CAR; 27	RCH; 21	ATL; 27	LVS; 20	DAR; 39	HCY; 28	TEX; 24	BRI; 15	NSV; 23	TAL; 29	NHA; 30	NZH; 22	CLT; DNQ	DOV; 35	SBO; 11	GLN; 31	MLW; 25	MYB; 28	GTY; 22	IRP	MCH; 27	BRI; 12	DAR; 36	RCH; 35	DOV	CLT									25th	2016	
1997	Phil Parsons Racing	0	Chevy																												CAL; 42	CAR	HOM						25th	2016	
1998	Michael Waltrip Racing	21	Ford	DAY	CAR	LVS	NSV	DAR	BRI	TEX	HCY; DNQ	TAL	NHA	NZH	CLT	DOV	RCH														GTY; 24	CAR	ATL	HOM					90th	128	
1998	Brewco Motorsports	87	Chevy															PPR; 43	GLN	MLW																			90th	128	
1998	Douglas Motorsports	73	Chevy																		MYB; DNQ		SBO; DNQ	IRP	MCH	BRI	DAR	RCH	DOV	CLT									90th	128	
1998	Phil Parsons Racing	0	Chevy																			CAL; 42																	90th	128	
1999	Douglas Motorsports	73	Chevy	DAY	CAR	LVS	ATL	DAR	TEX	NSV	BRI	TAL	CAL	NHA	RCH	NZH	CLT	DOV	SBO	GLN	MLW	MYB	PPR	GTY	IRP	MCH	BRI	DAR	RCH	DOV	CLT	CAR; DNQ	MEM	PHO	HOM; DNQ				NA	-	
2008	MSRP Motorsports	90	Chevy	DAY	CAL	LVS	ATL; 38	BRI; 38	NSH; 39	TEX; 39	PHO; 38	MXC	TAL; 39	RCH; 42	DAR; 38	CLT; DNQ	DOV; 39	NSH; 37	KEN; 36	MLW; 39	NHA; 38	DAY; 40	CHI; 37	GTY; 35	IRP; 41	CGV	GLN	MCH; 39	BRI; DNQ	CAL; 39	RCH; 43	DOV; 38	KAN; DNQ	CLT; 41	MEM; DNQ	TEX; 39	PHO	HOM	47th	1073	
2009	MSRP Motorsports	90	Chevy	DAY; DNQ	CAL; 39	LVS; 42	BRI; 41	TEX; 43	NSH; 43	PHO	TAL; DNQ	RCH; 43	DAR; 42	CLT; 42	DOV; 40	NSH; 38	KEN; 39	MLW; 43	NHA; 43	DAY; 43	CHI; DNQ	GTY; 39	IRP; 41	IOW; 42	GLN	MCH; 39	BRI; 43	CGV	ATL; 42	RCH; 42	DOV; 40	KAN; 42	CAL; 42	CLT; 43	MEM; DNQ	TEX; 40	PHO; 40	HOM; 42	46th	1090	
2010	K-Automotive Motorsports	92	Dodge	DAY; DNQ	CAL; DNQ	LVS; DNQ	BRI; 43	NSH	PHO	TEX	TAL																												70th	482	
2010	K-Automotive Motorsports	26	Dodge									RCH; 33																											70th	482	
2010	K-Automotive Motorsports	96	Dodge										DAR; DNQ																										70th	482	
2010	Stratus Racing Group, Inc.	73	Dodge											DOV; 39	CLT	NSH	KEN	ROA																					70th	482	
2010	Faith Motorsports	75	Chevy																NHA; 40																				70th	482	
2010	Baker-Curb Racing	43	Chevy																	DAY; 42																			70th	482	
2010	Faith Motorsports	89	Chevy																		CHI; 42	GTY; 40	IRP; 42	IOW; DNQ	GLN; 40	MCH; DNQ	BRI	CGV	ATL; 39	RCH	DOV; 40	KAN; DNQ	CAL; DNQ	CLT	GTY; 37	TEX	PHO	HOM	70th	482	
2011	Rick Ware Racing	75	Ford	DAY	PHO	LVS	BRI	CAL	TEX	TAL	NSH; 43	RCH; 39	DAR; 37	DOV; Wth	IOW; 36	CLT	CHI; 38	MCH	ROA	DAY				IRP; 37	IOW; 38	GLN	CGV										HOM; DNQ		42nd	99	
2011	Rick Ware Racing	75	Chevy																		KEN; 39	NHA; 38	NSH; 36																42nd	99	
2011	Rick Ware Racing	41	Chevy																									BRI; DNQ	ATL; 43	RCH; 34	CHI; 38	DOV; 35	KAN; 38	CLT; 40	TEX; DNQ	PHO; 40			42nd	99	

==== Camping World Truck Series ====
NASCAR Camping World Truck Series results
Year	Team	No.	Make	1	2	3	4	5	6	7	8	9	10	11	12	13	14	15	16	17	18	19	20	21	22	23	24	25	26	27	NCWTC	Pts	Ref
1996	Walker Evans Racing	02	Dodge	HOM	PHO	POR	EVG	TUS	CNS	HPT	BRI	NZH	MLW	LVL; 32	I70; 26	IRP	FLM	GLN													59th	322	
1996	Walker Evans Racing	19	Dodge																NSV; 29	RCH; 23	NHA	MAR	NWS	SON	MMR	PHO	LVS				59th	322	
1998	Phelon Motorsports	66	Ford	WDW	HOM	PHO	POR	EVG	I70	GLN	TEX	BRI	MLW	NZH	CAL	PPR	IRP	NHA	FLM	NSV	HPT	LVL	RCH; 36	MEM; 19	GTY	MAR	SON	MMR	PHO	LVS	72nd	161	
2003	Green Light Racing	07	Chevy	DAY	DAR	MMR	MAR	CLT	DOV	TEX	MEM	MLW	KAN	KEN; 27	GTW	MCH; 26	IRP; 36	NSH; 17	BRI; 30	RCH	NHA	CAL; 19	LVS	SBO	TEX	MAR	PHO	HOM			45th	513	
2004	Ken Weaver Racing	20	Chevy	DAY	ATL	MAR	MFD	CLT	DOV	TEX; 31	MEM	MLW	KAN	KEN	GTW; 34																57th	284	
2004	Green Light Racing	08	Chevy													MCH; 19	IRP	NSH	BRI	RCH	NHA	LVS									57th	284	
2004	Green Light Racing	07	Chevy																				CAL; 20	TEX	MAR	PHO	DAR	HOM			57th	284	
2005	Green Light Racing	08	Chevy	DAY	CAL	ATL	MAR	GTY	MFD	CLT	DOV	TEX; 36	MCH; 23	MLW	KAN; 35	KEN; 21	MEM	IRP	NSH	BRI	RCH	NHA	LVS	MAR	ATL	TEX	PHO	HOM			57th	317	
2006	Green Light Racing	07	Chevy	DAY	CAL	ATL	MAR	GTY	CLT; 29	MFD					KAN; 33	KEN	MEM	IRP	NSH	BRI	NHA	LVS	TAL	MAR	ATL						58th	201	
2006	Green Light Racing	08	Chevy								DOV; 34	TEX	MCH	MLW																	58th	201	
2006	Green Light Racing	03	Chevy																							TEX; 35	PHO	HOM			58th	201	
2007	Green Light Racing	78	Chevy	DAY	CAL	ATL; 35	MAR	KAN	CLT	MFD	DOV	TEX	MCH	MLW	MEM	KEN	IRP	NSH	BRI	GTW	NHA										108th	61	
2007	Green Light Racing	08	Chevy																			LVS; 34	TAL	MAR	ATL	TEX	PHO	HOM			108th	61	
2008	SS-Green Light Racing	0	Chevy	DAY	CAL	ATL	MAR	KAN	CLT	MFD	DOV	TEX	MCH	MLW; 36	MEM	KEN	IRP; 34	NSH	BRI	GTW	NHA	LVS	TAL	MAR	ATL	TEX					105th	64	
2008	SS-Green Light Racing	07	Chevy																								PHO; 33	HOM			105th	64	
2009	Wyler Racing	06	Toyota	DAY; 32	CAL; 33																										40th	448	
2009	GunBroker Racing	21	Dodge			ATL; 35	MAR	KAN		DOV; 31	TEX	MCH	MLW	MEM	KEN	IRP	NSH	BRI													40th	448	
2009	SS-Green Light Racing	08	Chevy						CLT; 33										CHI; 33	IOW	GTW	NHA	LVS	MAR	TAL	TEX; 34	PHO	HOM			40th	448	
2010	SS-Green Light Racing	21	Dodge	DAY	ATL	MAR	NSH	KAN	DOV; 30	CLT	TEX; 27	MCH	IOW																		82nd	155	
2010	DGM Racing	72	Chevy											GTY; 36	IRP	POC	NSH	DAR	BRI	CHI; DNQ	KEN	NHA	LVS	MAR	TAL	TEX	PHO	HOM			82nd	155	
2011	SS-Green Light Racing	07	Chevy	DAY	PHO	DAR	MAR	NSH; 35	DOV; 31	CLT	KAN		KEN; 23	IOW	NSH; 32	IRP	POC	MCH	BRI	ATL; 34	CHI	NHA	KEN	LVS	TAL	MAR					91st	0^{1}	
2011	SS-Green Light Racing	07	Toyota									TEX; 33															TEX; 29	HOM; 36			91st	0^{1}	
2012	SS-Green Light Racing	07	Toyota	DAY	MAR	CAR; 35	KAN	CLT; DNQ		TEX; 31			CHI; 36	POC	MCH; 26		ATL; 32	IOW		LVS; 30	TAL; 32	MAR	TEX	PHO	HOM						39th	119	
2012	RSS Racing	93	Chevy						DOV; 32										KEN; 32												39th	119	
2012	RSS Racing	38	Chevy								KEN; DNQ	IOW																			39th	119	
2012	RSS Racing	5	Chevy													BRI; 36															39th	119	
2013	SS-Green Light Racing	07	Chevy	DAY	MAR	CAR; 28	KAN	CLT																							72nd	16	
2013	RSS Racing	38	Chevy						DOV; 36	TEX; 32	KEN	IOW	ELD	POC	MCH	BRI	MSP	IOW	CHI	LVS	TAL	MAR	TEX	PHO	HOM						72nd	16	

^{1} Ineligible for series points

==== Goody's Dash Series ====
NASCAR Goody's Dash Series results
Year	Team	No.	Make	1	2	3	4	5	6	7	8	9	10	11	12	13	14	15	16	17	18	19	20	NGDS	Pts	Ref
1989	N/A	07	Pontiac	DAY	FLO	NRV	HCY; N/A^{†}	CON	LAN; 10	SBO; N/A^{†}	NSV; 16	SUM	LAN; 6	AND; 6	BGS; 15	MYB	HCY; 6	LAN						21st	957	
1990	N/A	44	Pontiac	DAY; 14	NRV	AND; 4	LAN; 7	FLO; 4	STH; 3	SUM; 4	LAN; 7	BGS; 2	HCY; 16	CON; 9	TRI; 9	MYB; 4	ACE; 5	LAN; 2*	HCY; 1*					6th	2284	
1991	N/A	77	Pontiac	DAY; 7	FIF; 18	NRV; 1**	BGS; 18	FLO; 3	LAN; 12	**SUM**; 2	**STH**; 1**	LAN; 8	BGS; 1	HCY; 2	MYB; 1	ACE; 2	HCY; 1	SHO; 1*	NSV; 1					1st	2568	
1992	N/A	77	Pontiac	DAY; 5	**HCY**; 1	LON; 2	FLO; 16	**LAN**; 4	SUM; 4	STH; 12	BGS; 2	MYB; 4	NRV; 6	**SUM**; 2	ACE; 9	HCY; 3	VOL; 18							2nd	2129	
1993	N/A	44	Chevy	DAY	NSV	SUM	VOL	MAR; 15	LON	411	LAN	HCY; 3	SUM	FLO; 1	BGS	MYB; 3	NRV; 18	HCY; 8	VOL					17th	879	
1994	N/A	3	Chevy	DAY	VOL	FLO; 23	SUM	CAR	411	HCY; 6	LAN	BRI	SUM	FLO	BGS		NRV; 3	ASH	VOL	HCY; 21				26th	597	
1994	N/A	44	Chevy													MYB; 25								26th	597	
1995	N/A	3	Chevy	DAY	FLO	LAN	MYB	SUM	HCY	CAR	STH	BRI	SUM	GRE	BGS	MYB; 29	NSV; 17	FLO; 4	NWS	VOL	HCY	HOM		40th	348	
1998	N/A	12	N/A	DAY; DNQ	HCY	CAR																		60th	263	
1998	N/A	35	Pontiac				CLT; 9	TRI	LAN	BRI	SUM	GRE	ROU	SNM	MYB	CON	HCY							60th	263	
1998	N/A	84	Pontiac															LAN; 13	STA	LOU	VOL	USA	HOM	60th	263	
1999	NorthStar Motorsports	89	Pontiac	DAY	HCY; 3	CAR; 2	CLT; 3	BRI; 20	LOU	SUM	GRE	ROU	STA	MYB										23rd	896	
1999	N/A	07	Pontiac												HCY; 25									23rd	896	
1999	N/A	54	Pontiac													LAN; 3	USA	JAC	LAN					23rd	896	
2000	Randy Humphrey	77	Pontiac	DAY; 2	MON; 5	STA; 7	JAC; 21	CAR; 28																5th	2483	
2000	Randy Humphrey	33	Pontiac						CLT; 20	SBO; 1	ROU; 11	LOU; 1*	SUM; 2	GRE; 4	SNM; 23	MYB; 8	BRI; 2	HCY; 18	JAC; 5	USA; 7	LAN; 23			5th	2483	
2001	Randy Humphrey	33	Pontiac	DAY; 22	ROU	DAR; 23	CLT; 2	LOU	JAC	KEN; 3	SBO	DAY; 39	GRE	SNM	NRV		BRI; 4	ACE	JAC	USA	NSH; 25			22nd	941	
2001	N/A	44	Pontiac													MYB; 14								22nd	941	
2002	N/A	33	Pontiac	DAY; 38	HAR	ROU	LON	CLT; 3	KEN; 23	MEM	GRE; 21	SNM; 20	SBO	MYB	BRI; 5	MOT	ATL							22nd	666	
2003	N/A	33	Pontiac	**DAY**; 14	OGL	CLT; 5	SBO	GRE; 21	KEN; 25	BRI; 3	ATL													19th	629	
^{†} - Results/participation unknown

=== ARCA Re/Max Series ===
(key) (Bold – Pole position awarded by qualifying time. Italics – Pole position earned by points standings or practice time. * – Most laps led.)

ARCA Re/Max Series results
Year	Team	No.	Make	1	2	3	4	5	6	7	8	9	10	11	12	13	14	15	16	17	18	19	20	21	22	23	ARMC	Pts	Ref
1991	Bahre Racing	65	Pontiac	DAY	ATL	KIL	TAL	TOL	FRS	POC	MCH	KIL	FRS	DEL	POC	TAL	HPT	MCH	ISF	TOL	DSF	TWS	ATL; 10				107th	-	
1992	Cooper Racing	47	Olds	DAY	FIF	TWS	TAL	TOL	KIL	POC	MCH	FRS	KIL	NSH	DEL	POC	HPT	FRS	ISF	TOL	DSF	TWS	SLM	ATL; 24			115th	-	
2005	Ken Weaver Racing	20	Pontiac	DAY	NSH	SLM	KEN; 38	TOL	LAN	MIL	POC	MCH	KAN	KEN	BLN	POC	GTW	LER	NSH	MCH	ISF	TOL	DSF	CHI	SLM	TAL	174th	40	

Sporting positions
Preceded by Robert Huffman	NASCAR Dash Series Champion; 1991	Succeeded by Mickey York
Preceded by Robert Huffman	IPOWER Dash Series Champion; 2004	Succeeded by Wade Day
