= Cam Strader =

American racing driver

- Born: November 7, 1979 (age 47); Linwood, North Carolina, U.S.

ARCA Menards Series career
- 3 races run over 2 years
- Best finish: 97th (2002)
- First race: 2002 Pork The Other White Meat 400 (Atlanta)
- Last race: 2003 EasyCare Vehicle Service Contracts 150 (Charlotte)
Wins	Top tens	Poles
0	1	0
- Statistics up to date as of December 5, 2024.

Cameron Strader (born November 7, 1979) is an American former professional stock car racing driver who has competed in the ARCA Re/Max Series from 2002 to 2003. He is a former champion of the now defunct NASCAR Goody's Dash Series, having won the championship in 2001. After his driving career ended, he has since worked for teams like Stewart–Haas Racing, Kaulig Racing, Petty GMS Motorsports, Richard Childress Racing, and JR Motorsports.

Strader has also previously competed in the NASCAR Southeast Series, the ISCARS Dash Series, and the NASCAR Advance Auto Parts Weekly Series at Southern National Motorsports Park.

== Motorsports results ==
=== NASCAR ===
(key) (Bold - Pole position awarded by qualifying time. Italics - Pole position earned by points standings or practice time. * – Most laps led.)

==== Busch Series ====
NASCAR Busch Series results
Year	Team	No.	Make	1	2	3	4	5	6	7	8	9	10	11	12	13	14	15	16	17	18	19	20	21	22	23	24	25	26	27	28	29	30	31	32	33	34	NBSC	Pts	Ref
2002	Brian Weber Racing	84	Chevy	DAY	CAR; DNQ	LVS	DAR	BRI	TEX	NSH	TAL	CAL	RCH	NHA	NZH	CLT	DOV	NSH	KEN	MLW	DAY	CHI	GTY	PPR	IRP	MCH	BRI	DAR	RCH	DOV	KAN							N/A	0	
2002	Means Racing	52	Ford																													CLT; DNQ	MEM	ATL	CAR; DNQ	PHO	HOM; DNQ	N/A	0	
2004	Cam Strader Racing	06	Chevy	DAY	CAR	LVS	DAR	BRI	TEX	NSH	TAL	CAL	GTY	RCH	NZH	CLT	DOV	NSH	KEN	MLW	DAY	CHI	NHA	PPR	IRP	MCH	BRI; DNQ	CAL	RCH	DOV	KAN	CLT	MEM	ATL	PHO	DAR	HOM	N/A	0	

==== Goody's Dash Series ====
NASCAR Goody's Dash Series results
Year	Team	No.	Make	1	2	3	4	5	6	7	8	9	10	11	12	13	14	15	16	17	18	NGDS	Pts	Ref
2000	N/A	6	Mercury	DAY; DNQ	**MON**; 3*	STA; 22	JAC; 5	CAR; 3	CLT; 4	SBO; 3*	ROU; 16	LOU; 12	SUM; 4	GRE; 5	**SNM**; 3	MYB; 1	BRI; 20*	HCY; 5	JAC; 24	USA; 25	LAN; 3	7th	2442	
2001	N/A	6	Mercury	DAY; 8	ROU; 1			LOU; 5	**JAC**; 1*	KEN; 2	SBO; 5	**DAY**; 26	GRE; 21	SNM; 5	NRV; 3	MYB; 8	BRI; 2*	ACE; 3	JAC; 1	USA; 3	**NSH**; 3	1st	2824	
2001	N/A	16	Mercury			**DAR**; 2*	CLT; 1															1st	2824	
2002	N/A	6	Ford	DAY; 4				CLT; 5	KEN; 5													5th	2061	
2002	N/A	6	Mercury		HAR; 3*	ROU; 21	LON; 21			MEM; 2	GRE; 6	SNM; 1	SBO; 2	MYB; 2	BRI; 23	**MOT**; 3	ATL; 12					5th	2061	
2003	Clevenger Racing	15	Ford	DAY; 10	OGL	CLT	SBO															24th	494	
2003	N/A	6	Mercury					GRE; 1	KEN	BRI; 1	ATL											24th	494	

=== ARCA Re/Max Series ===
(key) (Bold – Pole position awarded by qualifying time. Italics – Pole position earned by points standings or practice time. * – Most laps led.)

ARCA Re/Max Series results
Year	Team	No.	Make	1	2	3	4	5	6	7	8	9	10	11	12	13	14	15	16	17	18	19	20	21	22	ARSC	Pts	Ref
2002	Steve Strader	06	Pontiac	DAY	ATL; 3	NSH; 32	SLM	KEN	CLT	KAN	POC	MCH	TOL	SBO	KEN	BLN	POC	NSH	ISF	WIN	DSF	CHI	SLM	TAL	CLT	97th	285	
2003	Steve Strader	06	Pontiac	DAY	ATL	NSH	SLM	TOL	KEN	CLT	BLN	KAN	MCH	LER	POC	POC	NSH	ISF	WIN	DSF	CHI	SLM	TAL	CLT; 13	SBO	133rd	165	

Sporting positions
Preceded by Robert Huffman	NASCAR Goody's Dash Series Champion; 2001	Succeeded by Jake Hobgood
