= Jake Hobgood =

American racing driver (born 1975)

- Born: July 24, 1975 (age 51) Winnsboro, South Carolina, U.S.

NASCAR Goody's Dash Series career
- Debut season: 1995
- Years active: 1995–2003
- Starts: 124
- Championships: 1
- Wins: 9
- Poles: 12
- Best finish: 1st in 2002
- Statistics up to date as of December 4, 2024.

Jake Hobgood (born July 24, 1975) is an American former professional stock car racing driver who competed in the NASCAR Goody's Dash Series from 1995 to 2003, where he won the championship in 2002, and won nine races and twelve poles. He is the older brother of Justin Hobgood, who has also competed in the series as well as the NASCAR Nationwide Series and NASCAR Camping World Truck Series, and the oldest son of Will Hobgood, who is a former champion of the Dash Series.

Hobgood has previously competed in the X-1R Pro Cup Series, as well as the later incarnations of the Dash Series, such as the IPOWER Dash Series and the ISCARS Dash Series.

== Motorsports results ==
=== NASCAR ===
(key) (Bold – Pole position awarded by qualifying time. Italics – Pole position earned by points standings or practice time. * – Most laps led.)

==== Craftsman Truck Series ====
NASCAR Craftsman Truck Series results
Year	Team	No.	Make	1	2	3	4	5	6	7	8	9	10	11	12	13	14	15	16	17	18	19	20	21	22	NCTC	Pts	Ref
2002	Brevak Racing	31	Ford	DAY; DNQ	DAR	MAR	GTY	PPR	DOV	TEX	MEM	MLW	KAN	KEN	NHA	MCH	IRP	NSH	RCH	TEX	SBO	LVS	CAL	PHO	HOM	N/A	0	

==== Goody's Dash Series ====
NASCAR Goody's Dash Series results
Year	Team	No.	Make	1	2	3	4	5	6	7	8	9	10	11	12	13	14	15	16	17	18	19	20	21	NGDS	Pts	Ref
1995	N/A	27	Pontiac	DAY	FLO	LAN	MYB	SUM	HCY	CAR	STH	BRI	SUM	GRE	BGS	MYB	NSV	FLO; 18	NWS; 17	VOL	HCY; 23				37th	449	
1995	N/A	5	Pontiac																			HOM; 10			37th	449	
1996	Will Hobgood	58	Pontiac	DAY; 41	HOM; 40	MYB; 10	SUM; 26	NSV; 22	TRI	CAR	HCY	FLO; 15	BRI	SUM	GRE	SNM	BGS	MYB	LAN	STH	FLO	NWS	VOL	HCY	35th	639	
1997	Will Hobgood	58	Pontiac	DAY; 6	HOM; 2	KIN; 2	MYB; 12	LAN; 4	CAR; 7	TRI; 9	FLO; 13	HCY; 8	BRI; 19	GRE; 23	SNM; 5	CLT; 5	MYB; 5	LAN; 17	SUM; 10	STA; 7	HCY; 6	USA; 9	CON; 21	HOM; 17	5th	2884	
1998	Will Hobgood	64	Pontiac	DAY; 27	HCY; 3	CAR; 22	CLT; 6	TRI; 3	LAN; 20	BRI; 17	SUM; 3	**GRE**; 1*	ROU; 7	**SNM**; 11	MYB; 2	CON; 24	**HCY**; 4	LAN; 3	**STA**; 24	LOU; 9	VOL; 8	USA; 2	**HOM**; 3		5th	2787	
1999	Will Hobgood	64	Pontiac	DAY; 12	HCY; 6	CAR; 3	CLT; 32	BRI; 23	LOU; 2	SUM; 2	**GRE**; 3	ROU; 2	STA; 3	MYB; 7	HCY; 20	LAN; 1	USA; 9	JAC; 20	LAN; 2						2nd	2283	
2000	Will Hobgood	64	Pontiac	DAY; 33	MON; 22	STA; 15	**JAC**; 10	CAR; 12	CLT; 19	SBO; 6	ROU; 15	LOU; 2	SUM; 7	GRE; 18	SNM; 4	MYB; 2	BRI; 18	HCY; 20	JAC; 2	USA; 1*	LAN; 15				8th	2349	
2001	Will Hobgood	64	Pontiac	DAY; 32	**ROU**; 5	DAR; 20		LOU; 2	JAC; 3	KEN; 20	SBO; 4	DAY	GRE; 6	SNM; 6	NRV; 2	MYB; 1*	BRI; 15	ACE; 9	JAC; 2	**USA**; 1*	NSH; 2				4th	2483	
2001	Will Hobgood	61	Pontiac				CLT; 10																		4th	2483	
2002	Will Hobgood	64	Pontiac	DAY; 2	HAR; 2	ROU; 2	LON; 5	CLT; 10	KEN; 1	MEM; 5	GRE; 1*	SNM; 3	SBO; 11	MYB; 1*	BRI; 8*	MOT; 2	ATL; 20								1st	2204	
2003	Will Hobgood	64	Toyota	DAY; 3	OGL; 18	CLT; 8	SBO; 1	GRE; 2	KEN; 11	BRI; 9	ATL; 4														3rd	1194	

Sporting positions
Preceded by Cam Strader	NASCAR Goody's Dash Series Champion; 2002	Succeeded by Robert Huffman
