= Derrick Kelley =

American racing driver (born 1964)

- Born: May 16, 1964 (age 62); Auburndale, Florida, U.S.

NASCAR FedEx Freight Truck Series career
- 1 race run over 1 year
- Best finish: 99th (2004)
- First race: 2004 MBNA America 200 (Dover)
Wins	Top tens	Poles
0	0	0
- Statistics up to date as of December 27, 2024.

Derrick Kelley (born May 16, 1964) is an American professional stock car racing driver who has competed in the NASCAR Craftsman Truck Series, and the NASCAR Goody's Dash Series.

Kelley has also previously competed in series such as the X-1R Pro Cup Series, the USAR Hooters Late Model Series, the NASCAR Southeast Series, and the World Series of Asphalt Stock Car Racing.

== Motorsports results ==
=== Stock car career summary ===
Season	Series	Team	Races	Wins	Top 5	Top 10	Points	Position
1997	NASCAR Goody's Dash Series	N/A	1	0	0	0	103	80th
1998	NASCAR Goody's Dash Series	N/A	3	0	0	2	402	46th
1999	NASCAR Goody's Dash Series	N/A	2	0	0	1	235	50th
2000	NASCAR Goody's Dash Series	N/A	3	0	0	1	330	40th
2001	NASCAR Goody's Dash Series	N/A	3	0	1	2	381	40th
2004	NASCAR Craftsman Truck Series	MRD Motorsports	1	0	0	0	85	99th
2024	ASA STARS National Tour	Derrick Kelley	0	0	0	0	5	106th
2025	ASA STARS National Tour	Douglas Clements	0	0	0	0	5	82nd
2026	ASA STARS National Tour	Derrick Kelley Racing	1	0	0	0		

=== NASCAR ===
(key) (Bold - Pole position awarded by qualifying time. Italics - Pole position earned by points standings or practice time. * – Most laps led.)

==== Craftsman Truck Series ====
NASCAR Craftsman Truck Series results
Year	Team	No.	Make	1	2	3	4	5	6	7	8	9	10	11	12	13	14	15	16	17	18	19	20	21	22	23	24	25	NCTC	Pts	Ref
2004	MRD Motorsports	06	Chevy	DAY	ATL	MAR	MFD	CLT	DOV; 26	TEX	MEM	MLW	KAN	KEN	GTW	MCH	IRP	NSH	BRI	RCH	NHA	LVS	CAL	TEX	MAR	PHO	DAR	HOM	99th	85	

==== Goody's Dash Series ====
NASCAR Goody's Dash Series results
Year	Team	No.	Make	1	2	3	4	5	6	7	8	9	10	11	12	13	14	15	16	17	18	19	20	21	NGDS	Pts	Ref
1997	N/A	22	Pontiac	DAY	HOM	KIN	MYB	LAN	CAR	TRI	FLO	HCY	BRI	GRE	SNM	CLT	MYB	LAN	SUM	STA	HCY	USA; 20	CON	HOM	80th	103	
1998	N/A	06	Pontiac	DAY; 7	HCY	CAR	CLT	TRI	LAN	BRI	SUM	GRE	ROU	SNM	MYB	CON	HCY	LAN	STA; 6	LOU	VOL	USA; 19	HOM		46th	402	
1999	N/A	28	Pontiac	DAY; 26	HCY	CAR	CLT	BRI	LOU	SUM	GRE	ROU	STA	MYB	HCY	LAN	USA; 8	JAC	LAN						50th	235	
2000	N/A	28	Ford	DAY; 22	MON																				40th	330	
2000	N/A	28	Pontiac			STA; 24	JAC	CAR	CLT	SBO	ROU	LOU	SUM	GRE	SNM	MYB	BRI	HCY	JAC						40th	330	
2000	N/A	22	Mercury																	USA; 8	LAN				40th	330	
2001	N/A	07	Pontiac	DAY; 2	ROU	DAR														USA; 6	NSH				41st	381	
2001	N/A	0	Pontiac				CLT; 34	LOU	JAC	KEN	SBO	DAY	GRE	SNM	NRV	MYB	BRI	ACE	JAC						41st	381	

=== ASA STARS National Tour ===
(key) (Bold – Pole position awarded by qualifying time. Italics – Pole position earned by points standings or practice time. * – Most laps led. ** – All laps led.)

ASA STARS National Tour results
Year	Team	No.	Make	1	2	3	4	5	6	7	8	9	10	11	12	ASNTC	Pts	Ref
2024	Derrick Kelley	21K	N/A	NSM; DNQ	FIF	HCY	MAD	MLW	AND	OWO	TOL	WIN	NSV			106th	5	
2025	Douglas Clements	1	Chevy	NSM; DNQ	FIF	DOM	HCY	NPS	MAD	SLG	AND	OWO	TOL	WIN	NSV	82nd	5	
2026	Derrick Kelley Racing	21	Chevy	NSM	FIF	HCY	SLG	MAD	NPS	OWO	TRI	WIN	NSV	NSM; 13		-*	-*	
