= Will Hobgood =

American racing driver (born 1952 or 1953)

- Born: 1952 or 1953 Winnsboro, South Carolina, U.S.

NASCAR Goody's Dash Series career
- Debut season: 1992
- Years active: 1992–1998, 2001
- Starts: 100
- Championships: 1
- Wins: 15
- Poles: 9
- Best finish: 1st in 1994
- Statistics up to date as of December 7, 2024.

Will Hobgood (born 1952 or 1953) is an American former professional stock car racing driver who competed in the NASCAR Goody's Dash Series from 1992 to 2001, where he won the championship in 1994, and won fifteen races and nine poles. He is the father of both Justin Hobgood, who has also competed in the series as well as the NASCAR Nationwide Series and NASCAR Camping World Truck Series, and Jake Hobgood, who is a former champion of the Dash Series.

Hobgood has previously competed in the NASCAR Sportsman Division, as well as the later incarnations of the Dash Series', such as the IPOWER Dash Series and the ISCARS Dash Series.

== Motorsports results ==
=== NASCAR ===
(key) (Bold – Pole position awarded by qualifying time. Italics – Pole position earned by points standings or practice time. * – Most laps led.)

==== Goody's Dash Series ====
NASCAR Goody's Dash Series results
Year	Team	No.	Make	1	2	3	4	5	6	7	8	9	10	11	12	13	14	15	16	17	18	19	20	21	NGDS	Pts	Ref
1992	Will Hobgood	65	Pontiac	DAY; 2	HCY	LON	FLO	LAN	SUM	STH	BGS	MYB	NRV	SUM	ACE	HCY	VOL								35th	170	
1993	Will Hobgood	65	Pontiac	DAY; 1	NSV; 3	SUM; 4	VOL; 13	MAR; 2	LON; 10	411; 10	LAN; 2	HCY; 21	SUM; 2	FLO; 16	BGS; 1	MYB; 1*	NRV; 2	HCY; 14	VOL; 3						3rd	2438	
1994	Will Hobgood	65	Pontiac	DAY; 10	VOL; 4	FLO; 1	**SUM**; 9	CAR; 10	411; 1**	HCY; 4	LAN; 14	**BRI**; 4*	SUM; 4	FLO; 1	BGS; 8	MYB; 30	NRV; 4	ASH; 1*	VOL; 2	HCY; 2					1st	2602	
1995	Will Hobgood	65	Pontiac	DAY; 22	FLO; 15	LAN; 4	MYB; 4	SUM; 1*	HCY; 13	CAR; 3	STH; 14	BRI; 16	SUM; 1	GRE; 2	BGS; 3	MYB; 8	NSV; 3	FLO; 11*	NWS; 29	VOL; 5	HCY; 6	HOM; 4			4th	2733	
1996	Will Hobgood	65	Pontiac	DAY; 2	HOM; 25	MYB; 5	SUM; 20	NSV; 7	TRI; 14	CAR; 17	HCY; 1	FLO; 13	**BRI**; 11	SUM; 2	GRE; 1*	**SNM**; 3*	BGS; 2	MYB; 4	LAN; 1*	STH; 3	FLO; 12	**NWS**; 1*	VOL; 4	HCY; 8	3rd	3128	
1997	Will Hobgood	65	Pontiac	DAY; 32	HOM; 12	KIN; 1	MYB; 1*	LAN; 2	CAR; 6	TRI; 2	**FLO**; 2	HCY; 18	BRI; 9	GRE; 14	SNM; 2	CLT; 3	MYB; 15	LAN; 3	SUM; 8	STA; 4	HCY; 4	USA; 14	CON; 2*	HOM; 5	3rd	3108	
1998	Will Hobgood	65	Pontiac	DAY; 41	HCY	CAR	CLT	TRI	LAN	BRI; 2	SUM	GRE	ROU	SNM	MYB	CON	HCY	LAN	STA	LOU	VOL	USA; 20	HOM; 5		41st	468	
2001	Miller Racing	79	Pontiac	DAY	ROU	DAR; 29	CLT	LOU	JAC	KEN	SBO	DAY	GRE	SNM	NRV	MYB	BRI	ACE	JAC	USA	NSH				75th	79	

Sporting positions
Preceded by Rodney Orr	NASCAR Goody's Dash Series Champion; 1994	Succeeded by David Hutto
