= Larry Caudill =

American racing driver (born 1948)

- Born: June 29, 1948 (age 78); North Wilkesboro, North Carolina, U.S.

NASCAR Cup Series career
- 1 race run over 1 year
- Best finish: 107th (1987)
- First race: 1987 Delaware 500 (Dover)
Wins	Top tens	Poles
0	0	0
- Statistics up to date as of December 22, 2024.

Larry Caudill (born June 29, 1948) is an American former professional stock car racing driver who has previously competed in the NASCAR Winston Cup Series and the NASCAR Goody's Dash Series. He is a former champion of the Dash Series, having won the championship in 1987 and 1988.

Caudill also competed in the NASCAR All-American Challenge Series, the NASCAR Sportsman Division, and the ARTGO Challenge Series.

== Motorsports career results ==
=== NASCAR ===
(key) (Bold - Pole position awarded by qualifying time. Italics - Pole position earned by points standings or practice time. * – Most laps led.)

==== Winston Cup Series ====
NASCAR Winston Cup Series results
Year	Team	No.	Make	1	2	3	4	5	6	7	8	9	10	11	12	13	14	15	16	17	18	19	20	21	22	23	24	25	26	27	28	29	NWCC	Pts	Ref
1987	Hamby Motorsports	12	Olds	DAY	CAR	RCH	ATL	DAR	NWS	BRI	MAR	TAL	CLT	DOV	POC	RSD	MCH	DAY	POC	TAL	GLN	MCH	BRI	DAR	RCH	DOV; 21	MAR	NWS	CLT	CAR	RSD	ATL	107th	0	

Sporting positions
Preceded by Hut Stricklin	NASCAR Charlotte/Daytona Dash Series Champion; 1987	Succeeded by Larry Caudill
Preceded by Larry Caudill	NASCAR Charlotte/Daytona Dash Series Champion; 1988	Succeeded by Gary Wade Finley
