= Rodney Orr =

American racing driver

- Born: Rodney Bryan Orr; November 6, 1962; Robbinsville, North Carolina, U.S.
- Died: February 14, 1994 (aged 31); Daytona Beach, Florida, U.S.
- Cause of death: Head and neck injuries from an auto racing accident
- Achievements: 1993 NASCAR Goody's Dash Series champion

NASCAR Cup Series career
- 0 races run over 1 year
- First race: Killed during practice for the 1994 Daytona 500
Wins	Top tens	Poles
0	0	0

Rodney Bryan Orr (November 6, 1962 – February 14, 1994) was an American stock car racing driver. The 1993 NASCAR Goody's Dash Series champion, he was killed in an accident during practice for the 1994 Daytona 500.

== Career ==
Orr was born in Robbinsville, North Carolina. He was a graduate of Robbinsville High School. Orr was a resident of Palm Coast, Florida and started his racing career at Volusia County Speedway in the late 1980s. He was the rookie of the year in the NASCAR Goody's Dash Series in 1992, and won the series 1993 championship.

== Death ==
Originally, Orr and his father Beacher had planned to advance to the second-tier series (currently the O'Reilly Auto Parts Series). However, NASCAR planned a rule change that would make the current V6 engines obsolete by switching to a limited compression (9.5:1) V8 engine in 1995. As a result, the Orrs purchased a Ford Thunderbird during the 1993-1994 off-season from Robert Yates Racing with an engine built by Ernie Elliott in hopes of competing in selected 1994 Winston Cup Series races. Orr's No. 37 was one of seven cars to exceed 190 miles per hour (310 km/h) at one test session that winter.

Until 2002, the qualifying procedure for the Daytona 500 featured multiple rounds. In the first round, only the top two cars qualified for the race.

In subsequent rounds, drivers could give up their starting position and attempt to qualify with a faster lap as backup. Only the top 14 drivers (excluding the driver starting first) in each heat race advanced to the Daytona 500. After both qualifying races, ten positions were based on non-qualifying drivers' qualifying lap, so drivers would give up starting position for a faster in case they failed to finish in the top 14, where fastest qualifying time determined who qualified.

During practice for second round Daytona 500 qualifying on February 14, 1994, Orr was making what was a mock qualifying run when he spun entering turn two. His car lifted up and slammed heavily into the outside retaining wall and catch fence with the roof at over 175 miles per hour (282 km/h). The caution light was found pierced into the roof of the car. Although there were efforts to save him, Orr had instantly died of massive chest and head injuries. The 31-year-old driver was survived by his wife, Crystal, and daughter Ashton. It was later found that a mounting stud, a part that holds the shock absorber to the car, had broken, rendering the car uncontrollable. Orr's death came three days after that of Neil Bonnett on the same track.

These incidents were related to suspension failure caused by using extremely soft shocks and springs. Drivers complained about shocks and springs at the two fastest circuits, magnified after the then Pepsi 400 moved to night in 1998 because of sparks, leading to NASCAR imposing rule changes mandating specification shocks and springs to solve the problem by 2000. As of 2022, NASCAR and suspension parts suppler Tenneco mandate specification shocks and springs for all Cup Series races.

== Photo scandal ==
In 2001, after the death of Dale Earnhardt, photos from Orr's autopsy as well as those of Bonnett were displayed on the internet. Earnhardt's widow Teresa testified before Congress to ensure that Earnhardt's autopsy photos would not be published in a similar fashion. Orr's father sued the owner of the website which had published the photos of his son, stating a claim for outrageous publication of a public record.

== Motorsports career results ==
=== NASCAR ===
(key) (Bold - pole position awarded by qualifying time Italics - pole position earned by points standings or practice time * – most laps led.)

==== Winston Cup Series ====
NASCAR Winston Cup Series results
Year	Team	No.	Make	1	2	3	4	5	6	7	8	9	10	11	12	13	14	15	16	17	18	19	20	21	22	23	24	25	26	27	28	29	30	31	NWCC	Pts	Ref
1994	Orr Motorsports	37	Ford	DAY; Wth	CAR	RCH	ATL	DAR	BRI	NWS	MAR	TAL	SON	CLT	DOV	POC	MCH	DAY	NHA	POC	TAL	IND	GLN	MCH	BRI	DAR	RCH	DOV	MAR	NWS	CLT	CAR	PHO	ATL	N/A	0	

Preceded by Neil Bonnett	NASCAR Sprint Cup Series fatal accidents 1994	Succeeded by Kenny Irwin Jr.
Sporting positions
Preceded by Mickey York	NASCAR Goody's Dash Series Champion; 1993	Succeeded by Will Hobgood
