= Gary Wade Finley =

American racing driver

- Born: June 17, 1960; Huntsville, Alabama, U.S.
- Died: November 6, 2022 (aged 62); Toney, Alabama, U.S.

Gary Wade Finley Jr. (June 17, 1960 – November 6, 2022) was an American multiple time champion at Huntsville (AL) Speedway. Finley won the 1989 NASCAR Charlotte/Daytona Dash Series championship. Finley won the Daytona 200 event that year for the series.

Finley competed in one ARCA Racing Series race in 1984. He finished seventh. He also competed in two NASCAR Southeast Series events in 1993. He arrived at Nashville Speedway USA in 1999 to compete in the NASCAR SuperTruck division at Nashville Speedway USA. The speedway was promoted by Alabama's Bob Harmon. Finley at season end claimed the rookie title and the championship title for the 1999 season.

Finley was married to Misty Rose Finley and for the 2016 season headed up the teams of his two sons. Garrett Finley is currently driving the open wheel modified division and actively competes at Huntsville (AL) Speedway. The younger son Austin, competes at Fairgrounds Speedway Nashville in the limited late model division. The 2016 season was his rookie season.

Finley died at his home in Toney, Alabama on November 6, 2022.
