= ISCARS Dash Touring Series =

Stock car racing series created by NASCAR in 1973

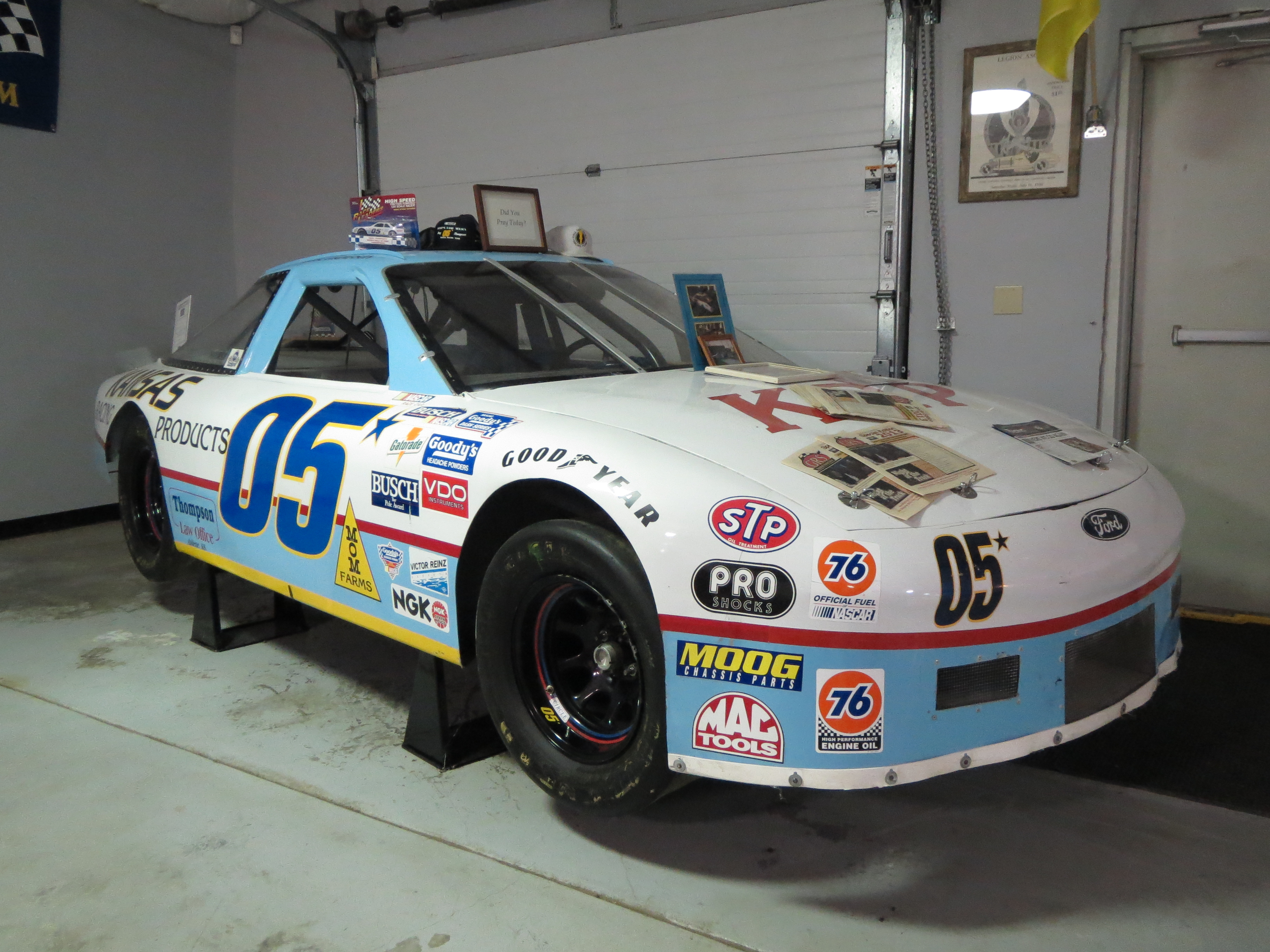
- A former Goody's Dash Series automobile, based on the Ford Probe.
- Category: Stock car racing
- Country: United States
- Inaugural season: 1975
- Folded: 2011
- Last Drivers' champion: Danny Bagwell

The ISCARS Dash Touring Series (previously known as the NASCAR Baby Grand National, Goody's Dash Series and IPOWER Dash Series among others) was a stock car racing series created by NASCAR in 1973, initially running solely at North Wilkesboro Speedway, that involved V6 powered stock cars raced over relatively short distances. In 1975 the series branched out to other tracks besides North Wilkesboro Speedway. After the end of the 2003 season, NASCAR transferred the Goody's Dash series to IPOWER (International Participants Of Winning Edge Racing). In 2004, they ran the IPOWER Dash Series. In January 2005, officials announced the cancellation of the 2005 Dash season due to problems with sponsorship. The International Sport Compact Auto Racing Series (ISCARS) purchased the series allowing the series to continue through 2005 and was operating until 2011.

== History ==
=== NASCAR sanctioning ===
The unofficial start of the series was in 1973 in North Wilkesboro, North Carolina. A group of drivers began racing on a road course owned by former NASCAR Cup owner Bill Ellis. Ellis decided not to continue after a few races. The drivers decided to format an association called the Baby Grand National Racing Association, Inc. (BGNRA), and appointed Charlie Triplett as president. Triplett says the name stemmed from the cars' resemblance to the Grand National (predecessor to the modern NASCAR Cup Series) cars of the era, as paint schemes and numbers often matched those from Grand National cars. The series was originally a touring series of four-cylinder compact sedan cars. The slogan for the series was "The Poor Man's Way to Race." The founder turned to NASCAR to begin sanctioning the series in 1975. The series flourished with the relatively inexpensive cars and motors. It was not uncommon for forty drivers to enter an event.

Five-time champion Dean Combs used a Nissan Silvia in the 1980 season and became the first NASCAR driver to 'regularly' compete in a foreign-made car. Contrary to popular belief, foreign cars had competed in NASCAR competition in the early days of the sanctioning body; indeed, a Jaguar won a NASCAR-sanctioned race in the Grand National division at a road course in Linden, New Jersey in 1954, according to commentator Mike Joy, and the last foreign-made car to compete in a NASCAR-sanctioned event was an MG at one Grand National race in 1963 (before Toyota, who had used the Dash Series to prepare their stock car endeavors as demonstrated by Robert Huffman's championship victory in 2003, entered the Truck Series in 2004 and later Cup Series at the beginning of the 2007 season).

During the series' existence, the series became a place for young drivers to gain valuable experience competing against seasoned veterans like Danny Bagwell, Geoff Bodine, Johnny Chapman, Jake, and Justin Hobgood, all of which have experience at the top levels of NASCAR. 1986 Daytona 500 Champion Geoff Bodine joined the circuit in 2008 to compete in the final four events; ISCARS later used the run to highlight Bodine's involvement as part of an extensive driver development program. Bagwell is well known for a destructive accident in 1999 at Daytona when the vehicle hit the wall and tumbled repeatedly. It ended up upside down, the engine was gone, all the wheels were out, the windshield, and the sheet metal disintegrated, leaving only a pile of bent safety bars. Also in this series was the only car ever to careen into Lake Lloyd, Dave Stacey in 1994. The series was not free from fatal accidents during NASCAR's sanctioning: Joe Young and Joe Booher died in Daytona Dash Series races in 1987 and 1993, respectively.

NASCAR significantly changed the dynamics of the series in the early 1980s. NASCAR mandated using the Iron Duke motor (manufactured by Pontiac), changing the cost for a motor from approximately $800 to $22,000. Pontiac provided motors to five or six teams. The much greater expense led to only ten to twelve teams competing in events. NASCAR changed from a four-cylinder to a V6 motor in 1998, but still allowed teams to use either four or six cylinder engines from that point on. Most teams elected to use the V6 engines. NASCAR's sanctioning for the series ended in 2003, when they transferred the sanctioning to IPOWER (International Participants Of Winning Edge Racing).

=== Death of Roy Weaver and demise ===
On February 8, 2004, the first IPOWER Dash race ended in tragedy when Roy Weaver, a safety worker at Daytona International Speedway, was killed when he was struck by a car driven by Ray Paprota. Weaver was attempting to pick up debris from a racing accident at the time. Although inconsequential to the incident, it is noteworthy that Ray Paprota is a paraplegic and was driving with hand controls. For the rest of Speedweeks, flags at Daytona flew at half-mast in Weaver's memory.

In 2005, Weaver's widow and three children competed on The Amazing Race: Family Edition, a reality television competition show on CBS. Two of the challenges were directly related to racing. The family finished in third place, and were largely negatively viewed in the season.

After Weaver's fatal accident, the Dash Series would not appear on TV and failed to find sponsorship. After the 2005 season was initially canceled, former Dash Series Chaplain and NASCAR Media Coordinator, Randy Claypoole, revived the series under the name International Sport Compact Auto Racing Series (ISCARS). The series held over 100 events, from 2005, until its final race at Hickory Motor Speedway in October 2011. In the series' final years, the cars featured a rear wing, but different from those used on the fifth-generation Car of Tomorrow used in the Cup Series between 2007 and mid-2010.

== List of series names ==
- 1973 – 1974: The Baby Grand National Racing Association
- 1975 – 1979: The Baby Grand Series
- 1980 – 1982: NASCAR International Sedan Series
- 1983 – 1984: Darlington Dash Series
- 1985 – 1989: Charlotte/Daytona Dash Series
- 1990 – 1991: NASCAR Dash Series
- 1992 – 2003: NASCAR Goody's Dash Series
- 2004: IPOWER Dash Series
- 2005 – 2007: ISCARS DASH Touring
- 2008 – 2011: ISCARS DASH Touring, Sanctioned by ASA

== List of champions ==
- 2011 Danny Bagwell, Cordova, AL
- 2010 Danny Bagwell, Cordova, AL
- 2009 Jason Shultz, Manassas, VA
- 2008 Danny Bagwell, Cordova, AL
- 2007 Danny Bagwell, Cordova, AL
- 2006 Eric Wilson, Taylorsville, NC
- 2005 Wade Day
- 2004 Johnny Chapman
- 2003 Robert Huffman
- 2002 Jake Hobgood
- 2001 Cam Strader
- 2000 Robert Huffman
- 1999 Robert Huffman
- 1998 Robert Huffman
- 1997 Mike Swaim Jr.
- 1996 Lyndon Amick
- 1995 David Hutto
- 1994 Will Hobgood
- 1993 Rodney Orr
- 1992 Mickey York
- 1991 Johnny Chapman
- 1990 Robert Huffman
- 1989 Gary Wade Finley
- 1988 Larry Caudill
- 1987 Larry Caudill
- 1986 Hut Stricklin
- 1985 Mike Swaim
- 1984 Mike Swaim
- 1983 Michael Waltrip
- 1982 Larry Hoopaugh
- 1981 Dean Combs
- 1980 Dean Combs
- 1979 Larry Hoopaugh
- 1978 Larry Hoopaugh
- 1977 Dean Combs
- 1976 Dean Combs
- 1975 Dean Combs

== Other former regular drivers ==
- Andy Belmont, a three-time winner
- Rob Moroso, a six-time winner
- Phil Parsons, a five-time winner
- Larry Pearson, a five-time winner
- Robert Pressley, a three-time winner
- Michael Waltrip, 1983 Champion
- Davey Allison
- Kerry Earnhardt
- Maxie Bush, Daytona winner
- Morgan Shepherd
- Andy Houston
- Shawna Robinson
- Jeffrey Collier, qualifying lap record holder
- Christian Elder, Daytona winner
- James Hylton Jr. Mechanic.
