= Motordrome Speedway =

Racetrack

Coordinates: 40.17611°N 79.72739°W

Motordrome Speedway was a 1/2-mile NASCAR sanctioned racetrack located in South Huntingdon Township, Westmoreland County, to the northeast of Smithton, Pennsylvania, United States.

Weekly series divisions that ran included super late models, modifieds, street stocks, chargers and super compacts. The track operated Friday nights weekly from April to October until closing its doors in 2015. As of March 2016, the track was closed and for sale or lease.

The track and buildings are all still on the property, though have become looted and vandalized as often happens with "abandoned" properties with little or no security.

The original Motordrome was in nearby Ruffs Dale. East Huntingdon Township. It was a dirt track. Pits were on one side of the track and stands on the other.

== Late Model points champions ==
- 1990 Steve Peles
- 1991 Glenn Gault
- 1992 Charlie Cragan
- 1993 Charlie Cragan
- 1994 Charlie Cragan
- 1995 Mark Cottone
- 1996 Jeff Dunmyer
- 1997 Jeff Dunmyer
- 1998 Jeff Dunmyer
- 1999 Richard Mitchell
- 2000 Richard Mitchell
- 2001 Mark Cottone
- 2002 Garry Wiltrout
- 2003 Rick Miller
- 2004 Rick Miller
- 2005 Rick Miller
- 2006 Richard Mitchell
- 2007 Richard Mitchell
- 2008 Richard Mitchell
- 2009 Mark Cottone
- 2010 Mark Cottone
- 2011 Barry Awtey
- 2012 Neil Brown
- 2013 Garry Wiltrout
- 2014 Bobby Henry
- 2015 Garry Wiltrout

=== NASCAR Northeast Region champions ===
- Charlie Cragan: 1992, 1993, 1994
- Jeff Dunmyer: 1997
- Richard Mitchell: 1999, 2000

== NASCAR K&N Pro Series East winner ==
- 2015 Dillon Bassett

== CARS Hooters Pro Cup Series winners ==
- 2002 Jay Fogleman
- 2003 Kertus Davis
