= Louisville Motor Speedway =

Racetrack

Coordinates: 38.129859°N 85.737008°W

Louisville Motor Speedway was a 3/8-mile race track located in Louisville, Kentucky. It was opened in 1988.

Louisville Motor Speedway hosted 5 NASCAR Craftsman Truck Series races from 1995 to 1999. Also hosted 2 NASCAR Busch Series events, one in 1988 and the other in 1989.

The track hosted 7 NASCAR Southeast Series events from 1995 to 2001.

ARCA Racing Series ran 3 races at the speedway between 1994 and 1996.

The speedway also hosted one ASA National Tour event in 2000. USAR Hooters Pro Cup Series also ran one event at the facility in 2001.

Renegades TNT Motorsports Monster Truck Challenge had run at the track from 1988 to 1990 and United States Hot Rod Association Super Bowl of Motorsport in 1992 and 1993.

On Friday nights, the track hosted a Sportsman division which were similar to Camaros and they had Figure-8s.

Saturday night, LMS hosted Mini-Trucks, Street Stocks and Late Models.

Keith Gardner was a 4-time champion in the Late Models from 1991 to 1994, and Bill Kimmel Jr. was Late Model champion from 1995 to 1998. Bill Kimmel Jr. is the brother of 10-time ARCA Champion Frank Kimmel. He was Franks's crew chief in the ARCA Racing Series division. He is now the sole owner of Kimmel Racing in which his son, Will Kimmel, is the primary driver of the team.

Many Celebrity Announcers like Ken Stout, Scott Douglass, Army Armstrong, and Marty Reid got their start at the track. Current Monster Jam competition director, announcer/director for the announcing team, Douglass also was the general manager from 1997 to 1999 at the track.

The track was closed and demolished shortly after Kentucky Speedway opened. The site is now home to an industrial park.
