= Deac McCaskill =

American racing driver

- Born: September 26, 1977 (age 49); Raleigh, North Carolina, U.S.
- Achievements: 2016 CARS Late Model Stock Tour Champion; 2008, 2010 Thunder Road 200 Winner

NASCAR O'Reilly Auto Parts Series career
- 1 race run over 1 year
- Best finish: 139th (2007)
- First race: 2007 Kroger 200 (IRP)
Wins	Top tens	Poles
0	0	0
- Statistics up to date as of January 31, 2022.

Deac McCaskill (born September 26, 1977) is an American professional stock car racing driver from Raleigh, North Carolina. He currently drives the No. 08 Puryear Tanklines Chevrolet in the Late Model Stock class at South Boston Speedway in Virginia.

McCaskill is a former champion of the CARS Late Model Stock Tour, having won the championship in 2016.

== Early years ==
McCaskill began race car driving at the age of twelve at the Wake County Speedway in Raleigh, North Carolina. In his first start, he finished tenth out of 28 cars. He would eventually win his first race in his sixth start at the bullring. At the age of sixteen, he became the youngest winner in the Limited Late Model class in his first start at Southern National Raceway Park in Kenly, North Carolina. At eighteen years old, McCaskill won his first Late Model Stock race at Orange County Speedway, and then finishing second in points that year. Later that year, McCaskill qualified on the pole out of 128 cars at the Richmond International Raceway, and followed that up with a fifth place finish.

== Professional career ==
In 2000, McCaskill was once again a bridesmaid with a second-place finish in points at Orange County Speedway. He won four races that year to make his career total fifty by the time the year was over. In 2001 and 2002, McCaskill had two wins and a seventh and third-place finish in points at Orange County Speedway. The 2003 season brought six wins in thirteenstarts at Orange County Speedway, as well as a fourth-place finish at Martinsville Speedway.

In 2004, McCaskill won the LMSC Championship at Southern National Speedway, and had a fourth place finish in the UARA STARS Race at Bristol Motor Speedway. In 2005, McCaskill returned to Bristol and nabbed a second place finish. He made ten more starts in the UARA STARS in 2005 and got two wins. In 2006, McCaskill outran NASCAR Nextel Cup Series star Denny Hamlin at Southern National Speedway's annual event, the Thanksgiving Classic. He also won the 2006 track championship at Southern National.

2007 saw McCaskill's first ever NASCAR start in the Busch Series at Indianapolis Raceway Park. Driving the No. 9 Puryear Tank Lines Dodge for Evernham Motorsports, McCaskill started 42nd and worked his way up the top-ten using pit strategy. He eventually led five laps and was the highest running non Cup driver, in eighth place, until he was involved in a crash with Steve Wallace on lap 153. In 2008, McCaskill finished third in the Late Model Stock points at South Boston Speedway.

== Motorsports career results ==
=== NASCAR ===
(key) (Bold – Pole position awarded by qualifying time. Italics – Pole position earned by points standings or practice time. * – Most laps led.)

==== Busch Series ====
NASCAR Busch Series results
Year	Team	No.	Make	1	2	3	4	5	6	7	8	9	10	11	12	13	14	15	16	17	18	19	20	21	22	23	24	25	26	27	28	29	30	31	32	33	34	35	NBSC	Pts	Ref
2007	Evernham Motorsports	9	Dodge	DAY	CAL	MXC	LVS	ATL	BRI	NSH	TEX	PHO	TAL	RCH	DAR	CLT	DOV	NSH	KEN	MLW	NHA	DAY	CHI	GTY	IRP; 35	CGV	GLN	MCH	BRI	CAL	RCH	DOV	KAN	CLT	MEM	TEX	PHO	HOM	139th	63	

=== CARS Late Model Stock Car Tour ===
(key) (Bold – Pole position awarded by qualifying time. Italics – Pole position earned by points standings or practice time. * – Most laps led. ** – All laps led.)

CARS Late Model Stock Car Tour results
Year	Team	No.	Make	1	2	3	4	5	6	7	8	9	10	11	12	13	14	15	16	17	CLMSCTC	Pts	Ref
2015	McCaskill Motorsports	08	Ford	**SNM**; 2*	**ROU**; 10	HCY; 13	**SNM**; 1**	TCM; 6		ROU; 2	CON; 7	MYB; 2*	HCY; 7								2nd	289	
2015	McCaskill Motorsports	8	Ford						**MMS**; 20*												2nd	289	
2016	McCaskill Motorsports	08	Ford	**SNM**; 1**	ROU; 2*	HCY; 2	TCM; 2*	**GRE**; 6	ROU; 2	CON; 4	MYB; 5	HCY; 1	SNM; 7								1st	316	
2017	McCaskill Motorsports	8	Ford	CON; 5																	4th	329	
2017	McCaskill Motorsports	08	Ford		DOM; 2	DOM; 11	HCY; 3	HCY; 4	BRI; 28	AND	ROU; 2	TCM; 4	ROU; 1*		**CON**; 3	SBO; 1*					4th	329	
2017	McCaskill Motorsports	3	Ford											HCY; 11							4th	329	
2018	McCaskill Motorsports	08	Ford	TCM; 6	MYB; 14		HCY; 5	BRI; 8													3rd	322	
2018	JR Motorsports	88	Chevy			ROU; 1*															3rd	322	
2018	Tommy Lemons Jr.	22	Ford						ACE; 17	CCS; 11	KPT; 5			ROU; 2*	SBO; 2						3rd	322	
2018	Tommy Lemons Jr.	60	Ford									HCY; 6									3rd	322	
2018	McCaskill Motorsports	22	Ford										**WKS**; 4								3rd	322	
2019	McCaskill Motorsports	08	Ford	SNM; 3	HCY; 7	ROU; 23	ACE; 3	MMS; 7	LGY; 1	DOM; 7	CCS; 2		ROU; 5	SBO; 23							3rd	274	
2019	McCaskill Motorsports	2	Ford									HCY; 10									3rd	274	
2020	McCaskill Motorsports	08	Ford	**SNM**; 2																	15th	161	
2020	McCaskill Motorsports	08	Chevy		ACE; 27	HCY; 12	HCY; 14	DOM													15th	161	
2020	R&S Race Cars	19	Toyota						FCS; 6	LGY	CCS	FLO; 7	GRE; 4								15th	161	
2021	McCaskill Motorsports	08	Chevy	DIL; 9	HCY; 4	OCS; 2	ACE; 14	CRW; 2	LGY; 3	DOM; 21		MMS; 14	TCM; 14	FLC; 10	**WKS**; 1*	SBO; 9					5th	321	
2021	McCaskill Motorsports	49M	Chevy								HCY; 10										5th	321	
2022	McCaskill Motorsports	08	Ford	CRW; 8	HCY	GPS	AAS; 2	FCS; 10	LGY; 9	DOM		ACE; 22	MMS; 1*	NWS	TCM; 19	ACE	SBO; 7	CRW			16th	218	
2022	McCaskill Motorsports	99M	Ford								HCY; 5										16th	218	
2023	McCaskill Motorsports	08	Ford	SNM; 1	FLC; 17	HCY; 5	ACE; 13	NWS; 35	LGY; 15	DOM	CRW			TCM; 21	WKS; 20	AAS; 8	SBO; 1**	TCM; 4	CRW		14th	256	
2023	McCaskill Motorsports	08N	Ford									HCY; 11	ACE								14th	256	
2024	McCaskill Motorsports	08	Ford	SNM; 3	HCY; 23	AAS; 23	OCS; 16	ACE; 16	TCM; 3	LGY; 9	DOM; 28	CRW; 15				WCS; 19	FLC	SBO	TCM; 24	NWS	18th	189	
2024	McCaskill Motorsports	08M	Ford										HCY; 26	NWS	ACE						18th	189	
2025	McCaskill Motorsports	08	Ford	AAS; 20	WCS; 22	CDL	OCS	ACE	NWS	LGY	DOM	CRW	HCY; 9	AND	FLC	SBO; 20	TCM	NWS			29th	96	
