= 2016 CARS Tour =

20th season of the CARS Tour

The 2016 CARS Tour was the 20th season of the CARS Tour, a stock car racing series. It began at Southern National Motorsports Park on April 3 and ended at the same track on November 12. Deac McCaskill won the Late Model Stock Tour championship, while Raphaël Lessard won the Super Late Model Tour championship.

Brayton Haws entered the season as the defending Late Model Stock Tour champion, while Cole Timm entered as the defending Super Late Model Tour champion.

== Schedule & results ==
Date	Track	Location	LMSC Winner	SLM Winner
April 3	Southern National Motorsports Park	Kenly, North Carolina	Deac McCaskill	Quin Houff
April 16	Orange County Speedway	Rougemont, North Carolina	Timothy Peters	Christopher Bell
May 7	Hickory Motor Speedway	Hickory, North Carolina	Josh Berry	Raphaël Lessard
June 11	Tri-County Motor Speedway	Hudson, North Carolina	Josh Berry	Cole Timm
June 25	Greenville-Pickens Speedway	Greenville, South Carolina	Tommy Lemons Jr.	Matt Craig
July 30	Orange County Speedway	Rougemont, North Carolina	Tommy Lemons Jr.	Stephen Nasse
August 27	Concord Speedway	Concord, North Carolina	Josh Berry	Raphaël Lessard
September 17	Myrtle Beach Speedway	Myrtle Beach, South Carolina	Josh Berry	Raphaël Lessard
October 29	Hickory Motor Speedway	Hickory, North Carolina	Deac McCaskill	Brandon Setzer
November 12	Southern National Motorsports Park	Kenly, North Carolina	Josh Berry	Raphaël Lessard

== Standings ==
=== Late Model Stock Car championship ===
(key) Bold – Pole position awarded by time. Italics – Pole position set by final practice results or rainout. * – Most laps led.

Pos	Driver	SNM	ROU	HCY	TCM	GRE	ROU	CON	MYB	HCY	SNM	Points
1	Deac McCaskill	**1****	2*	2	2*	**6**	2	4	5	1	7	316
2	Tommy Lemons Jr.	2	5	3	3	1	1	8	2	**3**	5	304
3	Josh Berry	3	3	1	1	4		**1***	1*	2*	1	296
4	Christian Eckes	12	12	9	21	10	3	3	4	5	3	249
5	Austin McDaniel	17	9	4	8	7	6	6	9	6		226
6	Chris Hudspeth	21	14	6	15	15	10	11	13	11	4	210
7	Chris Davis	22	16	7	11	11	9	15	17	14	9	199
8	Craig Stallard	19	10	18	12	18	17	13	19	8	11	195
9	Ronald Hill	23	15	14	9	16	12	18	14	12	13	184
10	Justin Crider	10	11	13	13	13	14	12	8	19		184
11	Thomas Beane	24	19	11	10	14	11	16	18	13		161
12	Stefan Parsons	26	22	12	5	12	15*	10	12			152
13	Layne Riggs				20		4	17	10	18	2	127
14	Chase Purdy	13	7	18		5	7					115
15	R. D. Smith III		6	16	DNQ		13			16	10	106
16	Justin Carroll				6	19		5		4		99
17	Myatt Snider	4	4					2				90
18	Chad McCumbee	6			7	2*						86
19	Robert Tyler		17		4	20			7			84
20	Ryan Wilson	15	13	17			16					71
21	Stephen Leicht							7	15	10		68
22	Craig Moore						5			17	14	63
23	Justin Johnson	9	8									49
24	Jake Ruggles		18	15	19							47
25	Jeffrey Oakley	16									**6**	47
26	Landon Huffman			**5**	17							45
27	Chris Denny		23				**18**			15		44
28	Bradley McCaskill	7	21									38
29	Timothy Peters		**1**									35
30	Bruce Anderson		20								12	34
31	Mason Diaz	25									8	33
32	Hayden Humphrey	18			16	DNQ						33
33	Sam Yarbrough								3			32
34	Dylan Hall					3						30
35	Tal Davidson	14	24									28
36	Matt Bowling	5										28
37	B. J. Mackey								6			27
38	Evan Swilling									7		26
39	Jeb Burton	8										25
40	Jeremy Burns					8						25
41	Scott Bishop						8					25
42	Matt Piercy			10*								25
43	Anthony Alfredo									9		24
44	Colby Howard					9						24
45	Travis Swaim							9				24
46	Haley Moody								11			22
47	Mike Darne	11										22
48	Terry Brooks Jr.							14				19
49	Charlie Watson				14							19
50	Stacy Puryear										15	18
51	Zachary Dabbs								16			17
52	Will Burns					17						16
53	Tyler English				18							15
54	Ryan Repko			19								14
55	Shaun Mangum							19				14
56	Trevor Rizzo								20	DNS		14
57	Michael Fose	20										13
58	Jerry Miracle							20				13
59	Bryant Barnhill								21			12
60	Adam Murray	27										6
Pos	Driver	SNM	ROU	HCY	TCM	GRE	ROU	CON	MYB	HCY	SNM	Points

=== Super Late Model championship ===
(key) Bold – Pole position awarded by time. Italics – Pole position set by final practice results or rainout. * – Most laps led.

Pos	Driver	SNM	ROU	HCY	TCM	GRE	ROU	CON	MYB	HCY	SNM	Points
1	Raphaël Lessard	3	2	1	7	5	11	**1***	**1**	3	1	307
2	Brandon Setzer	11	4	3	2*	6	7	9	18	**1***	**2**	275
3	Matt Craig	5		10	3	**1***	13	4	4*	14	7*	244
4	Lucas Jones	18	12	12	12	12	4	DNQ	13	4	5	207
5	Cole Timm	2	6	19	1	2	15			18	3	203
6	Quin Houff	1*	8	5	8	7	21	3				182
7	Tyler Ankrum	22	7	15	6	11	8		5			157
8	Jeff Batten	16	20	17	15		23	15	16	6	14	155
9	Tate Fogleman	23	23		5	14	18		8	20	4	149
10	Gus Dean	13	21	14	16	10			2		9	146
11	Clay Jones	20	15	8	18		14		9		8	139
12	Trevor Noles	**4**	**17**	11	17		5					115
13	Steve Wallace			4	4			7	11			107
14	Zane Smith	19	11			4		13		16		103
15	Stephen Leicht	17	14	22	13	15				15		102
16	Jake Crum	21	9	6	14						15	100
17	Dalton Sargeant	24	3				2		3			100
18	Preston Peltier		5	9			19	2				96
19	Jody Measamer						9		6	19	18	80
20	A. J. Frank			7	10		6					76
21	Harrison Burton	7				8		14				71
22	Tyler Church			18	20		17			8		70
23	Stephen Nasse	12	22				**1****					68
24	Vinnie Miller			21			16	DNQ		11	17	67
25	Garret Archer				11					10	13	65
26	Garrett Jones	15	10		9							65
27	Tanner Thorson						3	5				58
28	Christian Eckes			**2***				10				57
29	Joey Mucciacciaro	8	19	20								52
30	Chandler Smith						12			5		49
31	Spencer Davis						10			7		49
32	Tanner Berryhill			13	**19**		20					48
33	Todd Gilliland								7		11	48
34	Jared Irvan	6									12	48
35	Chase Purdy								14		6	46
36	Jody Lavender					13			12			41
37	Kyle Grissom		18			9						39
38	Hannah Newhouse								17	13		36
39	Christopher Bell		1*									35
40	Riley Herbst									2		31
41	Anthony Anders					3						30
42	Joey Padgett							6				27
43	Ali Kern							8				25
44	Josh Berry									9		24
45	Jeff Fultz	9										24
46	Chad McCumbee								10			24
47	Kevin Floars	10	DNS									24
48	Jared Fryar										10	23
49	Michael Pilla							11				22
50	Brad Rogers							12				21
51	Taylor Stricklin									12		21
52	Tanner Gray		13									20
53	Nicole Behar	14		DNQ								20
54	Korbin Forrister								15			18
55	Mike Darne										16	17
56	Alex Guenette			16								17
57	John Hunter Nemechek		16									17
58	Tristan Van Wieringen									17		16
59	Wade Day						22					11
Pos	Driver	SNM	ROU	HCY	TCM	GRE	ROU	CON	MYB	HCY	SNM	Points

== See also ==
- 2016 NASCAR Sprint Cup Series
- 2016 NASCAR Xfinity Series
- 2016 NASCAR Camping World Truck Series
- 2016 NASCAR K&N Pro Series East
- 2016 NASCAR K&N Pro Series West
- 2016 NASCAR Whelen Modified Tour
- 2016 NASCAR Whelen Southern Modified Tour
- 2016 NASCAR Pinty's Series
- 2016 NASCAR Whelen Euro Series
