= Kyle Grissom =

American racing driver

- Born: September 19, 1989 (age 37); Concord, North Carolina, U.S.

ARCA Menards Series career
- 1 race run over 1 year
- Best finish: 79th (2009)
- First race: 2009 ARCA Re/Max American 200 (Rockingham)
Wins	Top tens	Poles
0	0	0
- Statistics up to date as of November 25, 2025.

S. Kyle Grissom (born September 19, 1989) is an American former professional stock car racing driver who has previously competed in the ARCA Racing Series and the CARS Super Late Model Tour. He is the son of former NASCAR driver Steve Grissom, who won the NASCAR Busch Series championship in 1993.

After retiring from racing, Grissom became an associate for Colliers International.

Grissom has also competed in series such as the PASS South Super Late Model Series, where he won the championship in 2012, the UARA STARS Late Model Series, the ASA Southern Super Series, and the NASCAR Weekly Series.

== Motorsports results ==
=== ARCA Re/Max Series ===
(key) (Bold – Pole position awarded by qualifying time. Italics – Pole position earned by points standings or practice time. * – Most laps led.)

ARCA Re/Max Series results
Year	Team	No.	Make	1	2	3	4	5	6	7	8	9	10	11	12	13	14	15	16	17	18	19	20	21	ARSC	Pts	Ref
2009	Richard Childress Racing	31	Chevy	DAY	SLM	CAR	TAL	KEN	TOL	POC	MCH	MFD	IOW	KEN	BLN	POC	ISF	CHI	TOL	DSF	NJE	SLM	KAN	CAR; 33	79th	315	

=== CARS Super Late Model Tour ===
(key)

CARS Super Late Model Tour results
Year	Team	No.	Make	1	2	3	4	5	6	7	8	9	10	CSLMTC	Pts	Ref
2015	Steve Grissom	31	Chevy	SNM; 3	ROU; 3	HCY; 3	SNM; 10	TCM; 2*	MMS; 8	ROU; 5	CON; 6	MYB; 2*	HCY; 2	2nd	300	
2016	Danny Harrison	31	Chevy	SNM	ROU; 18	HCY	TCM	GRE; 9	ROU	CON	MYB	HCY	SNM	37th	39	
