= Cole Timm =

American racing driver

- Born: November 7, 1998 (age 28) Mooresville, North Carolina, U.S.

CARS Super Late Model Tour career
- Debut season: 2015
- Years active: 2015–2017, 2020
- Starts: 22
- Championships: 1
- Wins: 2
- Poles: 3
- Best finish: 1st in 2015
- Statistics up to date as of November 25, 2025.

Cole Timm (born November 7, 1998) is an American professional stock car racing driver and mechanic.

Timm is a former champion of the CARS Super Late Model Tour, having won the championship in the series' inaugural season in 2015. During that year, he won one race, with that coming the first race od the season at Southern National Motorsports Park, as well as three pole positions. Afterwards, Timm went on to win one more race over the next two years before make his final start in 2020.

Timm's father, Murray, is a fabricator for Hendrick Motorsports and has been with the team since 1996. The younger Timm was also a mechanic for the No. 9 car driven by Chase Elliott.

Timm has also competed in the PASS Pro Late Model Series, the PASS South Super Late Model Series, the ASA CRA Super Series, and the World Series of Asphalt Stock Car Racing.

== Motorsports results ==
=== CARS Super Late Model Tour ===
(key)

CARS Super Late Model Tour results
Year	Team	No.	Make	1	2	3	4	5	6	7	8	9	10	11	12	13	CSLMTC	Pts	Ref
2015	Murray Timm	57	Chevy	SNM; 1	ROU; 4	HCY; 4	SNM; 2	TCM; 5	MMS; 10	ROU; 3	CON; 2	MYB; 8	HCY; 7				1st	304	
2016	Murray Timm	57	Chevy	SNM; 2													5th	203	
2016	Murray Timm	57	Toyota		ROU; 6	HCY; 19		GRE; 2	ROU; 15	CON	MYB						5th	203	
2016	Murray Timm	97	Toyota				TCM; 1										5th	203	
2016	Murray Timm	97T	Toyota									HCY; 18					5th	203	
2016	Murray Timm	98	Toyota										SNM; 3				5th	203	
2017	Murray Timm	57	Toyota	CON; 5	DOM	DOM	HCY	HCY	BRI	AND	ROU	TCM	ROU	HCY; 16	CON; 11	SBO	19th	68	
2020	Murray Timm	57	Chevy	SNM	HCY	JEN	HCY	FCS	BRI	FLC; 10	NSH						26th	23	
