= Ronald Hill (racing driver) =

American racing driver

- Born: January 6, 1967 (age 59) Rougemont, North Carolina, U.S.

CARS Late Model Stock Tour career
- Debut season: 2015
- Years active: 2015–2023
- Starts: 63
- Championships: 0
- Wins: 0
- Poles: 0
- Best finish: 6th in 2017
- Statistics up to date as of November 24, 2025.

Ronald Hill (born January 6, 1967) is an American semi-retired professional stock car racing driver. He has previously competed in the CARS Tour from 2015 to 2023. He retired from full-time competition at the conclusion of the 2020 season.

Hill has also previously competed in the Virginia Late Model Triple Crown Series and the NASCAR Weekly Series, and is a former track champion at Orange County Speedway.

== Motorsports results ==
=== CARS Late Model Stock Car Tour ===
(key) (Bold – Pole position awarded by qualifying time. Italics – Pole position earned by points standings or practice time. * – Most laps led. ** – All laps led.)

CARS Late Model Stock Car Tour results
| Year | Team | No. | Make | 1 | 2 | 3 | 4 | 5 | 6 | 7 | 8 | 9 | 10 | 11 | 12 | 13 | 14 | 15 | 16 | CLMSCTC | Pts | Ref |
|---|---|---|---|---|---|---|---|---|---|---|---|---|---|---|---|---|---|---|---|---|---|---|
| 2015 | Ronald Hill | 74 | Chevy | SNM | ROU | HCY | SNM | TCM | MMS | ROU; 12 | CON | MYB | HCY; 19 | | | | | | | 34th | 35 | |
| 2016 | Ronald Hill | 74 | Chevy | SNM; 23 | ROU; 15 | HCY; 14 | TCM; 9 | GRE; 16 | ROU; 12 | CON; 18 | MYB; 14 | HCY; 12 | SNM; 13 | | | | | | | 9th | 184 | |
| 2017 | Ronald Hill | 74 | Ford | CON; 6 | DOM; 8 | DOM; 14 | HCY; 19 | HCY; 13 | | | | | ROU; 2 | | | SBO; 20 | | | | 6th | 265 | |
| 2017 | Ronald Hill | 74 | Chevy | | | | | | BRI; 24 | AND; 9 | ROU; 7 | TCM; 15 | | | CON; 14 | | | | | 6th | 265 | |
| 2017 | Ronald Hill | 07 | Ford | | | | | | | | | | | HCY; 12 | | | | | | 6th | 265 | |
| 2018 | Ronald Hill | 74 | Ford | TCM; 15 | MYB; 2 | ROU; 10 | HCY; 6 | BRI; 14 | ACE; 9 | CCS; 8 | KPT; 13 | | WKS; 9 | ROU; 12 | SBO; 18 | | | | | 7th | 262 | |
| 2018 | Ronald Hill | 27 | Chevy | | | | | | | | | HCY; 19 | | | | | | | | 7th | 262 | |
| 2019 | Ronald Hill | 74 | Chevy | SNM; 23 | HCY; 26 | ROU; 29 | ACE; 15 | MMS; 10 | LGY; 24 | DOM; 10 | CCS; 16 | | ROU; 9 | SBO; 11 | | | | | | 15th | 161 | |
| 2019 | Ronald Hill | 6 | Chevy | | | | | | | | | HCY; 29 | | | | | | | | 15th | 161 | |
| 2020 | Ronald Hill | 74 | Chevy | SNM; 7 | ACE; 21 | HCY; 18 | HCY; 19 | DOM; 19 | FCS; 13 | LGY; 16 | CCS; 6 | FLO; 12 | GRE; 28 | | | | | | | 14th | 171 | |
| 2021 | Ronald Hill | 74 | Chevy | DIL | HCY | OCS; 16 | ACE | CRW | LGY | DOM | HCY | MMS | TCM | FLC | WKS | SBO; 11 | | | | 29th | 37 | |
| 2022 | Ronald Hill | 74 | Chevy | CRW; 13 | HCY | GRE | AAS | FCS | LGY | DOM | HCY | ACE | MMS | NWS | TCM | ACE | SBO; 23 | CRW | | 51st | 22 | |
| 2023 | Ronald Hill | 74 | Chevy | SNM | FLC | HCY | ACE | NWS | LGY | DOM | CRW | HCY | ACE | TCM | WKS | AAS | SBO; 23 | TCM | CRW | 76th | 10 | |
