= Jake Crum =

American racing driver

- Born: September 25, 1991 (age 35); Newport, Tennessee, U.S.
- Achievements: 2008 UARA-Stars Champion; 2009 ValleyStar Credit Union 300 Winner; 2026 SMART Modified Tour Champion
- Awards: 2005 Allison Legacy Series Rookie of the Year

NASCAR O'Reilly Auto Parts Series career
- 4 races run over 1 year
- 2014 position: 111th
- Best finish: 111th (2014)
- First race: 2014 John R. Elliott HERO Campaign 300 (Kentucky)
- Last race: 2014 Ford EcoBoost 300 (Homestead)
| Wins | Top tens | Poles |
|---|---|---|
| 0 | 0 | 0 |

NASCAR FedEx Freight Truck Series career
- 16 races run over 5 years
- 2014 position: 51st
- Best finish: 37th (2012)
- First race: 2010 O'Reilly 200 (Bristol)
- Last race: 2014 UNOH 200 (Bristol)
| Wins | Top tens | Poles |
|---|---|---|
| 0 | 0 | 0 |
- Statistics up to date as of October 17, 2026.

Christopher Jake Crum (born September 25, 1991) is an American stock car racing driver who competes in the SMART Modified Tour, driving the No. 1JC for his own team. He has previously competed in the NASCAR Nationwide Series, the NASCAR Camping World Truck Series, and the NASCAR Whelen Modified Tour.

== Racing career ==
Through 2006, Crum captured multiple National Championships through the WKA, IKF, and INEX organizations. In 2007, Crum became the youngest driver to win a UARA-Stars Late Model Touring Series event at the age of fifteen. In 2008, Crum would win the UARA-Stars Championship driving for his family-owned operation.

Economic pressures forced Crum to run a partial schedule in 2009. The mixed schedule included Crum's ARCA Racing Series debut, which resulted in a sixth-place finish at Mansfield Motorsports Park. Crum also debuted in the Pro All Stars Series South division with a second-place finish at Newport Speedway.

On October 4, 2009, Crum became the youngest winner in the history of the annual Bailey's 300 held at Martinsville Speedway. The victory served as a crowning achievement for Crum who turned eighteen just nine days before the event. Competing against some of the most well-funded Late Model Stock Car operations in the country, Crum overcame the odds by pulling off an impressive victory by dominating the second half of the event. 83 cars took to the track in an attempt to make the 43-car field.

=== NASCAR K&N Pro Series East ===
Crum entered two NASCAR K&N Pro Series East events in 2010. The season opener at Greenville-Pickens Speedway ended early for Crum due to a broken fuel line suffered on a lap 49 restart while Crum was running in the seventh position. During the Martinsville event, Crum led eighteen laps before a late-race caution prior to rain halting the event.

=== NASCAR Camping World Truck Series ===
Crum made his NASCAR Camping World Truck Series debut at the Bristol Motor Speedway on August 18, 2010 during the O'Reilly 200. Crum drove the No. 21 SS-Green Light Racing entry and was featured as a SPEED Spotlight driver. Crum qualified thirteenth for the event and was running as high as seventh when contact with his teammate sent him to the pits for repair. After working on the truck, Crum was making his way back through the field when the fuel pump gave out, ending his night.

In 2012, Crum drove the JJC Racing No. 0 Dodge with sponsorship from Bandit Chippers in the series' season-opening race at Daytona International Speedway.

In the 2014 North Carolina Education Lottery 200 at Charlotte Motor Speedway, Crum and Ryan Ellis were involved in an incident, and later in the race, Crum turned Ellis into the wall. On May 22, NASCAR temporarily downgraded Crum's license, limiting him to driving at tracks no longer than 1.25 miles (2.01 km), while still being allowed to race on road courses. His license was restored June 20.

== Personal life ==
Crum is married.

=== Legal issues ===
In May 2023, Crum was arraigned and charged with simple assault after an incident at Hickory Motor Speedway involving Robert Huffman. Crum allegedly attacked Huffman from behind on the spotter's stand and kicked him while he was down following an on-track incident between Huffman's son Landon and Crum's wife. Crum immediately posted bail and was released. NASCAR responded by suspending Crum from all sanctioned events for the remainder of 2023 and deeming him ineligible to apply for a competition license until 2024, as Crum was also serving as a crew member at a NASCAR event without a license to do so.

== Motorsports career results ==
=== NASCAR ===
(key) (Bold – Pole position awarded by qualifying time. Italics – Pole position earned by points standings or practice time. * – Most laps led.)

==== Nationwide Series ====
NASCAR Nationwide Series results
| Year | Team | No. | Make | 1 | 2 | 3 | 4 | 5 | 6 | 7 | 8 | 9 | 10 | 11 | 12 | 13 | 14 | 15 | 16 | 17 | 18 | 19 | 20 | 21 | 22 | 23 | 24 | 25 | 26 | 27 | 28 | 29 | 30 | 31 | 32 | 33 | 34 | NNSC | Pts | Ref |
|---|---|---|---|---|---|---|---|---|---|---|---|---|---|---|---|---|---|---|---|---|---|---|---|---|---|---|---|---|---|---|---|---|---|---|---|---|---|---|---|---|
| 2011 | Mike Harmon Racing | 74 | Chevy | DAY | PHO | LVS | BRI | CAL | TEX | TAL | NSH | RCH | DAR | DOV | IOW | CLT | CHI | MCH | ROA | DAY | KEN | NHA | NSH | IRP | IOW | GLN | CGV | BRI | ATL | RCH; DNQ | CHI | DOV | KAN | CLT | TEX | PHO | | 194th | 0 | |
| 2011 | James Carter Racing | 72 | Toyota | | | | | | | | | | | | | | | | | | | | | | | | | | | | | | | | | | HOM; DNQ | 194th | 0 | |
| 2014 | DRG Motorsports | 86 | Chevy | DAY | PHO | LVS | BRI | CAL | TEX | DAR | RCH | TAL | IOW | CLT | DOV | MCH | ROA | KEN; 27 | DAY | NHA; 31 | CHI | IND | IOW | GLN | MOH | | | | | | | | | | | | | 111th | 0^{1} | |
| 2014 | DRG Motorsports | 86 | Ford | | | | | | | | | | | | | | | | | | | | | | | BRI; 33 | ATL | RCH | CHI | KEN | DOV | KAN | CLT | TEX | PHO | | | 111th | 0^{1} | |
| 2014 | Browning Motorsports | 26 | Chevy | | | | | | | | | | | | | | | | | | | | | | | | | | | | | | | | | HOM; 24 | | 111th | 0^{1} | |

==== Camping World Truck Series ====
NASCAR Camping World Truck Series results
| Year | Team | No. | Make | 1 | 2 | 3 | 4 | 5 | 6 | 7 | 8 | 9 | 10 | 11 | 12 | 13 | 14 | 15 | 16 | 17 | 18 | 19 | 20 | 21 | 22 | 23 | 24 | 25 | NCWTC | Pts | Ref |
|---|---|---|---|---|---|---|---|---|---|---|---|---|---|---|---|---|---|---|---|---|---|---|---|---|---|---|---|---|---|---|---|
| 2010 | SS-Green Light Racing | 21 | Chevy | DAY | ATL | MAR | NSH | KAN | DOV | CLT | TEX | MCH | IOW | GTY | IRP | POC | NSH | DAR | BRI; 31 | CHI | KEN | NHA | LVS | MAR | TAL | TEX | PHO | HOM | 114th | 70 | |
| 2011 | Jake Crum Racing | 01 | Chevy | DAY | PHO | DAR | MAR | NSH | DOV | CLT | KAN | TEX | KEN | IOW | NSH | IRP; 25 | POC | MCH | BRI; 33 | ATL | CHI | NHA | KEN | LVS | TAL | MAR | | | 97th | 0^{1} | |
| 2011 | MAKE Motorsports | 55 | Chevy | | | | | | | | | | | | | | | | | | | | | | | | TEX; 25 | HOM | 97th | 0^{1} | |
| 2012 | Jennifer Jo Cobb Racing | 0 | RAM | DAY; DNQ | | | | | | | | | | | | | | | | | | | | | | | | | 37th | 128 | |
| 2012 | SS-Green Light Racing | 07 | Chevy | | MAR; 18 | CAR | KAN | | | | | | | | | | | | | | | | | | | | | | 37th | 128 | |
| 2012 | Jake Crum Racing | 01 | Chevy | | | | | CLT; 23 | DOV | TEX | KEN; 31 | IOW | CHI | POC | MCH | BRI; 29 | ATL | IOW | KEN; 13 | LVS | TAL | | | | HOM; 22 | | | | 37th | 128 | |
| 2012 | Jennifer Jo Cobb Racing | 10 | RAM | | | | | | | | | | | | | | | | | | | MAR; DNQ | TEX | PHO | | | | | 37th | 128 | |
| 2013 | Jake Crum Racing | 01 | Chevy | DAY | MAR | CAR | KAN | CLT; 31 | DOV | TEX | KEN | IOW | ELD | POC | | | | | | | | | | | | | | | 44th | 54 | |
| 2013 | SS-Green Light Racing | 81 | Chevy | | | | | | | | | | | | MCH; 28 | | | | | | | | | | | | | | 44th | 54 | |
| 2013 | SS-Green Light Racing | 07 | Toyota | | | | | | | | | | | | | BRI; 19 | MSP | IOW | CHI | LVS | TAL | MAR | TEX | PHO | HOM | | | | 44th | 54 | |
| 2014 | Empire Racing | 82 | Chevy | DAY | MAR | KAN | CLT; 21 | | | | | | | | | | | | | | | | | | | | | | 51st | 49 | |
| 2014 | SS-Green Light Racing | 07 | Chevy | | | | | DOV; 29 | TEX | GTW | KEN | IOW | ELD | POC | MCH | | | | | | | | | | | | | | 51st | 49 | |
| 2014 | Jake Crum Racing | 01 | Chevy | | | | | | | | | | | | | BRI; 33 | MSP | CHI | NHA | LVS | TAL | MAR | TEX | PHO | HOM | | | | 51st | 49 | |

^{*} Season still in progress
^{1} Ineligible for series championship points

==== K&N Pro Series East ====
NASCAR K&N Pro Series East results
| Year | Team | No. | Make | 1 | 2 | 3 | 4 | 5 | 6 | 7 | 8 | 9 | 10 | NKNPSEC | Pts | Ref |
|---|---|---|---|---|---|---|---|---|---|---|---|---|---|---|---|---|
| 2010 | Tam Topham | 01 | Chevy | GRE; 28 | SBO | IOW | MAR; 13 | NHA | LRP | LEE | GRE | NHA | DOV | 42nd | 130 | |

==== Whelen Modified Tour ====
NASCAR Whelen Modified Tour results
| Year | Team | No. | Make | 1 | 2 | 3 | 4 | 5 | 6 | 7 | 8 | 9 | 10 | 11 | 12 | 13 | 14 | 15 | 16 | NWMTC | Pts | Ref |
|---|---|---|---|---|---|---|---|---|---|---|---|---|---|---|---|---|---|---|---|---|---|---|
| 2024 | Jeremy Gerstner | 55 | Chevy | NSM | RCH | THO | MON | RIV | SEE | NHA | MON | LMP | THO | OSW | RIV | MON | THO | NWS | MAR; 13 | 58th | 31 | |
| 2025 | Jake Crum | 37 | Chevy | NSM | THO | NWS; 21 | SEE | RIV | WMM | LMP | MON | MON | THO | RCH | OSW | NHA | RIV | THO | | 60th | 23 | |
| 2025 | Hill Enterprises | 79 | Chevy | | | | | | | | | | | | | | | | MAR; Wth | 60th | 23 | |

=== ARCA Racing Series ===
(key) (Bold – Pole position awarded by qualifying time. Italics – Pole position earned by points standings or practice time. * – Most laps led.)

ARCA Racing Series results
| Year | Team | No. | Make | 1 | 2 | 3 | 4 | 5 | 6 | 7 | 8 | 9 | 10 | 11 | 12 | 13 | 14 | 15 | 16 | 17 | 18 | 19 | 20 | 21 | ARSC | Pts | Ref |
|---|---|---|---|---|---|---|---|---|---|---|---|---|---|---|---|---|---|---|---|---|---|---|---|---|---|---|---|
| 2009 | Venturini Motorsports | 25 | Chevy | DAY | SLM | CAR | TAL | KEN | TOL | POC | MCH | MFD; 6 | IOW | KEN | BLN | POC | ISF | CHI | TOL | DSF | NJE | SLM | KAN | CAR | 148th | 80 | |
| 2011 | Hixson Motorsports | 28 | Chevy | DAY | TAL | SLM | TOL | NJE | CHI | POC; 26 | MCH | WIN | BLN | IOW | IRP | POC | ISF | MAD | DSF | SLM | KAN | TOL | | | 101st | 100 | |

=== CARS Late Model Stock Car Tour ===
(key) (Bold – Pole position awarded by qualifying time. Italics – Pole position earned by points standings or practice time. * – Most laps led. ** – All laps led.)

CARS Late Model Stock Car Tour results
| Year | Team | No. | Make | 1 | 2 | 3 | 4 | 5 | 6 | 7 | 8 | 9 | 10 | 11 | 12 | 13 | CLMSCTC | Pts | Ref |
|---|---|---|---|---|---|---|---|---|---|---|---|---|---|---|---|---|---|---|---|
| 2015 | Jamie Yelton | 8 | Chevy | SNM | ROU | HCY | SNM | TCM | MMS | ROU; 20 | CON | MYB | HCY; 23 | | | | 44th | 23 | |
| 2017 | Jake Crum | 01C | Ford | CON | DOM | DOM | HCY | HCY | BRI | AND | ROU | TCM | ROU | HCY | CON | SBO; 8 | 44th | 25 | |
| 2020 | Jake Crum | 01C | Chevy | SNM | ACE; DNQ | HCY | HCY | DOM | FCS | LGY | CCS | FLO | GRE | | | | 63rd | 0 | |
| 2021 | Justin Johnson | 54 | Ford | DIL | HCY | OCS | ACE | CRW | LGY | DOM | HCY | MMS; 15 | TCM | FLC | WKS | SBO | 52nd | 18 | |

=== CARS Super Late Model Tour ===
(key)

CARS Super Late Model Tour results
| Year | Team | No. | Make | 1 | 2 | 3 | 4 | 5 | 6 | 7 | 8 | 9 | 10 | 11 | 12 | 13 | CSLMTC | Pts | Ref |
|---|---|---|---|---|---|---|---|---|---|---|---|---|---|---|---|---|---|---|---|
| 2015 | N/A | 01 | N/A | SNM | ROU | HCY | SNM | TCM; 3 | MMS | ROU | CON | MYB | | | | | 36th | 40 | |
| 2015 | N/A | 8 | N/A | | | | | | | | | | HCY; 23 | | | | 36th | 40 | |
| 2016 | Hedgecock Racing | 41 | N/A | SNM; 21 | | | | | | | | | | | | | 16th | 100 | |
| 2016 | Hedgecock Racing | 2 | Chevy | | ROU; 9 | | | | | | | | | | | | 16th | 100 | |
| 2016 | Hedgecock Racing | 2C | Chevy | | | HCY; 6 | | | | | | | | | | | 16th | 100 | |
| 2016 | Hedgecock Racing | 01 | Chevy | | | | TCM; 14 | GRE | ROU | CON | MYB | HCY | | | | | 16th | 100 | |
| 2016 | Hedgecock Racing | 1 | Chevy | | | | | | | | | | SNM; 15 | | | | 16th | 100 | |
| 2017 | Billy Crum | 01 | Toyota | CON | DOM | DOM | HCY | HCY | BRI; 2 | AND | ROU | | | | | SBO; 6 | 23rd | 59 | |
| 2017 | Billy Crum | 01 | Chevy | | | | | | | | | TCM; 3 | ROU | HCY | CON | | 23rd | 59 | |
| 2018 | Billy Crum | 01 | Chevy | MYB | NSH | ROU | HCY; 16 | BRI; 25 | AND | HCY | ROU | SBO | | | | | 36th | 25 | |
| 2019 | N/A | 01 | Chevy | SNM | HCY | NSH | MMS | BRI; 20 | HCY | ROU | SBO | | | | | | N/A | 0 | |
| 2020 | Jamie Yelton | 01 | Chevy | SNM | HCY; 10 | JEN | HCY | FCS | BRI | FLC | NSH | | | | | | 28th | 23 | |

=== SMART Modified Tour ===
SMART Modified Tour results
| Year | Car owner | No. | Make | 1 | 2 | 3 | 4 | 5 | 6 | 7 | 8 | 9 | 10 | 11 | 12 | 13 | 14 | SMTC | Pts | Ref |
|---|---|---|---|---|---|---|---|---|---|---|---|---|---|---|---|---|---|---|---|---|
| 2023 | Paul French | 2 | LFR | FLO | CRW | SBO | HCY; 25 | FCS | | | | | | | | | | 26th | 112 | |
| 2023 | Paul French | 2PA | LFR | | | | | | CRW; 13 | ACE | CAR | PUL | | | | | | 26th | 112 | |
| 2023 | Paul French | 12PA | LFR | | | | | | | | | | TRI; 4 | | | | | 26th | 112 | |
| 2023 | Paul French | 12 | LFR | | | | | | | | | | | SBO; 12 | ROU | | | 26th | 112 | |
| 2024 | Paul French | 12 | LFR | FLO; DNS | **CRW**; 22 | | | | HCY; 5 | | | | | | | | | 15th | 282 | |
| 2024 | Paul French | 12PA | LFR | | | SBO; 15 | TRI; 9 | ROU | | FCS; 12 | CRW | | | | | SBO; 3 | NWS; 4 | 15th | 282 | |
| 2024 | Paul French | 12NC | LFR | | | | | | | | | JAC; 8 | CAR; 11 | CRW | DOM | | | 15th | 282 | |
| 2025 | Jamie Tomaino | 99 | N/A | FLO; 2* | AND; 5 | SBO; 15 | ROU; 7 | HCY; 6 | FCS; 9 | CRW; 13 | CPS; 10 | CAR; 7 | CRW; 11 | DOM; 7 | FCS; 3 | TRI; 26 | | 4th | 443 | |
| 2025 | Paul French | 1JC | N/A | | | | | | | | | | | | | | NWS; 21 | 4th | 443 | |
| 2026 | Jake Crum | 1JC | N/A | FLO; 10 | AND; 4 | SBO; 17 | DOM; 18 | HCY; 6 | WKS; 13 | FCR; 1 | CRW; 7 | PUL; 1* | CAR; 7 | ROU; 9 | TRI; 6 | NWS; 1 | | 1st | 638 | |
