= Ryan Wilson (racing driver) =

American racing driver (born 1991)

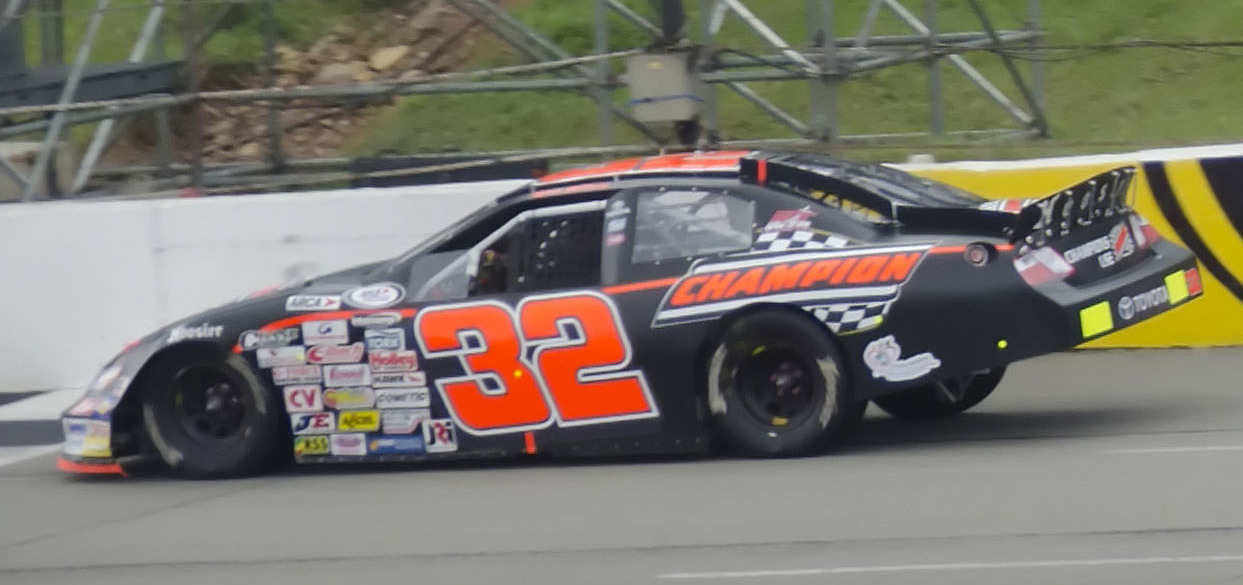
- Wilson's No. 32 car at Pocono Raceway in 2011
- Born: October 29, 1991 (age 35); Randleman, North Carolina, U.S.

ARCA Menards Series career
- 5 races run over 2 years
- Best finish: 30th (2011)
- First race: 2010 American 200 Presented by Black's Tire & Auto Service (Rockingham)
- Last race: 2011 Federated Car Care 200 (Toledo)
Wins	Top tens	Poles
0	2	0
- Statistics up to date as of January 18, 2025.

Ryan Wilson (born October 29, 1991) is an American professional stock car racing driver who competes full-time in the IHRA Stock Car Series, driving the No. 2 Ford for Ryan Wilson Motorsports. He has previously competed in the ARCA Racing Series and the CARS Late Model Stock Tour.

Wilson has also previously competed in series such as the Virginia Late Model Triple Crown Series, the NASCAR Advance Auto Parts Weekly Series, the UARA STARS Late Model Series, and the Dirty Dozen Series.

== Motorsports results ==
=== ARCA Racing Series ===
(key) (Bold – Pole position awarded by qualifying time. Italics – Pole position earned by points standings or practice time. * – Most laps led.)

ARCA Racing Series results
Year	Team	No.	Make	1	2	3	4	5	6	7	8	9	10	11	12	13	14	15	16	17	18	19	20	ARSC	Pts	Ref
2010	Richard Petty Driving Experience	15	Dodge	DAY	PBE	SLM	TEX	TAL	TOL	POC	MCH	IOW	MFD	POC	BLN	NJE	ISF	CHI	DSF	TOL	SLM	KAN	CAR; 14	96th	160	
2011	Win-Tron Racing	32	Toyota	DAY	TAL	SLM	TOL	NJE	CHI	POC	MCH	WIN	BLN	IOW	IRP; 21	POC; 9	ISF	MAD	DSF	SLM	KAN; 11	TOL; 6		30th	690	

=== CARS Late Model Stock Car Tour ===
(key) (Bold – Pole position awarded by qualifying time. Italics – Pole position earned by points standings or practice time. * – Most laps led. ** – All laps led.)

CARS Late Model Stock Car Tour results
Year	Team	No.	Make	1	2	3	4	5	6	7	8	9	10	11	12	13	14	15	16	17	CLMSCTC	Pts	Ref
2015	Dean Wilson	12	Ford	SNM; 25	ROU; DNQ	HCY	SNM	TCM	MMS	ROU	CON	MYB	HCY								56th	9	
2016	Dean Wilson	12	Ford	SNM; 15	ROU; 13	HCY; 17	TCM	GRE	ROU; 16	CON	MYB	HCY	SNM								20th	71	
2017	Dean Wilson	12	Ford	CON	DOM	DOM	HCY	HCY	BRI; DNQ	AND	ROU	TCM	ROU	HCY	CON	SBO					70th	1	
2019	Ryan Wilson Motorsports	12	Ford	SNM; 26	HCY	ROU	ACE	MMS	LGY	DOM	CCS	HCY	ROU	SBO							66th	7	
2022	Ryan Wilson Motorsports	2W	Ford	CRW; 33	HCY	GRE	AAS	FCS	LGY	DOM	HCY	ACE	MMS	NWS	TCM	ACE	SBO				44th	31	
2022	N/A	91	Toyota															CRW; 4			44th	31	
2023	Ryan Wilson Motorsports	2W	Ford	SNM; 29	FLC; 30	HCY; DNQ	ACE; 25	NWS	LGY	DOM	CRW	HCY	ACE								64th	16	
2023	Earle Hall	77	Chevy											TCM; 32	WKS	AAS	SBO	TCM	CRW		64th	16	
2024	Ryan Wilson Motorsports	2W	Ford	SNM	HCY	AAS	OCS	ACE	TCM	LGY	DOM	CRW	HCY	NWS	ACE	WCS	FLC; 19	SBO	TCM; 7	NWS; 17	N/A	0	
2025	Ryan Wilson Motorsports	2W	Ford	AAS; DNQ	WCS	CDL; 17	OCS; DNQ	ACE; 23	NWS; 35	LGY	DOM	CRW; 14	HCY; Wth	AND; 28	FLC; 22	SBO; 11	TCM	NWS			25th	153	

=== IHRA Late Model Sportsman Series ===
(key) (Bold – Pole position awarded by qualifying time. Italics – Pole position earned by points standings or practice time. * – Most laps led. ** – All laps led.)

IHRA Late Model Sportsman Series
Year	Team	No.	Make	1	2	3	ISCSS	Pts	Ref
2026	Ryan Wilson Motorsports	2	Ford	DUB; 3	CDL; 18	AND; 22	10th	98	
