= Thomas Beane =

American racing driver

- Born: August 8, 1993 (age 33) Hudson, North Carolina, U.S.

CARS Late Model Stock Tour career
- Debut season: 2015
- Years active: 2015–2018, 2022, 2025–present
- Starts: 32
- Championships: 0
- Wins: 0
- Poles: 1
- Best finish: 10th in 2015
- Statistics up to date as of October 2, 2026.

Thomas Beane (born August 8, 1993) is an American professional stock car racing driver. He currently competes in the zMAX CARS Tour, driving the No. 01 for Jody Chandler Racing.

Beane has also competed in the series such as the Virginia Late Model Triple Crown Series, the UARA STARS Late Model Series, the American Crate All-Star Series, and the NASCAR Weekly Series, and is a former track champion at Hickory Motor Speedway.

== Motorsports results ==
=== CARS Late Model Stock Car Tour ===
(key) (Bold – Pole position awarded by qualifying time. Italics – Pole position earned by points standings or practice time. * – Most laps led. ** – All laps led.)

CARS Late Model Stock Car Tour results
Year	Team	No.	Make	1	2	3	4	5	6	7	8	9	10	11	12	13	14	15	CLMSCTC	Pts	Ref
2015	Timothy Beane	31	Ford	SNM; 13	ROU; 8	HCY; 25	SNM; 19	TCM; 11	MMS; 18	ROU; 9	CON; 9	MYB; 19	HCY; 16						10th	193	
2016	Timothy Beane	31	Ford	SNM; 24	ROU; 19	HCY; 11	TCM; 10	GRE; 14	ROU; 11	CON; 16	MYB; 18	HCY; 13	SNM						11th	161	
2017	Thomas Beane	31	Ford	CON	DOM	DOM	HCY	HCY	BRI	AND	ROU	TCM	ROU	HCY	CON	SBO; 22			68th	11	
2018	Thomas Beane	31	Ford	TCM; 24	MYB	ROU	HCY	BRI	ACE	CCS	KPT; 20								26th	50	
2018	Robert Tyler	5B	Ford									HCY; 25							26th	50	
2018	Robert Tyler	44	Ford										WKS; 13	ROU	SBO				26th	50	
2022	Nelson Motorsports	12	Chevy	CRW	HCY	GRE	AAS	FCS	LGY	DOM	HCY	ACE	MMS	NWS	TCM; 24	ACE	SBO	CRW	74th	9	
2025	Jody Chandler Racing	X	Chevy	AAS	WCS	CDL	OCS	ACE	NWS	LGY	DOM	CRW	HCY; Wth	**AND**; 16	FLC	SBO			37th	67	
2025	Jody Chandler Racing	01	Chevy														TCM; 28	NWS; 23	37th	67	
2026	Jody Chandler Racing	01	Chevy	SNM	WCS	NSV; 30	CRW	ACE	LGY	DOM	NWS	HCY							35th	98	
2026	Matt Piercy Racing	7	Chevy										AND; 9	FLC	TCM; 19	NPS; 12	SBO		35th	98	
