= Austin McDaniel =

American racing driver

- Born: May 20, 1994 (age 32); Harrisburg, North Carolina, U.S.

ARCA Menards Series career
- 1 race run over 1 year
- Best finish: 102nd (2024)
- First race: 2024 General Tire 150 (Charlotte)
Wins	Top tens	Poles
0	0	0
- Statistics up to date as of May 21, 2024.

Austin McDaniel (born May 20, 1994) is an American professional stock car racing driver who last competed part-time in the ARCA Menards Series, driving the No. 57 Chevrolet for Brother-In-Law Racing.

== Racing career ==
McDaniel has competed in series such as the CARS Late Model Stock Tour, where he finished fifth in points in 2016, the Southeast Limited Late Model Series, the UARA STARS Late Model Series, and the Paramount Kia Big 10 Challenge. He is also a two-time track champion at Hickory Motor Speedway.

In 2024, McDaniel participated in the pre-season test for the ARCA Menards Series at Daytona International Speedway, driving the No. 75 Chevrolet for Brother-In-Law Racing, and placed 57th in the overall results between the two testing days. Several months later, it was revealed that McDaniel would make his series debut at Charlotte Motor Speedway, driving the No. 57 for BILR, having originally been tabbed to drive the No. 75. After placing 22nd in the lone practice session, he qualified in 24th and finished ten laps down in 21st.

== Motorsports career results ==
=== ARCA Menards Series ===
(key) (Bold – Pole position awarded by qualifying time. Italics – Pole position earned by points standings or practice time. * – Most laps led. ** – All laps led.)

ARCA Menards Series results
Year	Team	No.	Make	1	2	3	4	5	6	7	8	9	10	11	12	13	14	15	16	17	18	19	20	AMSC	Pts	Ref
2024	Brother-In-Law Racing	57	Chevy	DAY	PHO	TAL	DOV	KAN	CLT; 21	IOW	MOH	BLN	IRP	SLM	ELK	MCH	ISF	MLW	DSF	GLN	BRI	KAN	TOL	102nd	23	

=== CARS Late Model Stock Car Tour ===
(key) (Bold – Pole position awarded by qualifying time. Italics – Pole position earned by points standings or practice time. * – Most laps led. ** – All laps led.)

CARS Late Model Stock Car Tour results
Year	Team	No.	Make	1	2	3	4	5	6	7	8	9	10	11	12	13	14	15	16	CLMSCTC	Pts	Ref
2015	David Traylor	12M	Chevy	SNM; 22	ROU; 26	HCY; 2	SNM; 8	TCM; 8	MMS; 8	ROU; 7	CON; 21	MYB; 12	HCY; 11							7th	216	
2016	David Traylor	12M	Chevy	SNM; 17	ROU; 9	HCY; 4	TCM; 8	GRE; 7	ROU; 6	CON; 6	MYB; 9	HCY; 6	SNM							5th	226	
2017	David Traylor	12M	Chevy	CON; 2	DOM	DOM	HCY; 2	HCY; 3*	BRI	AND	ROU	TCM; 13	ROU	HCY; 3	CON; 6	SBO				12th	174	
2018	David Traylor	12M	Chevy	TCM; 10	MYB	ROU	HCY; 16	BRI	ACE	CCS	KPT									22nd	58	
2018	David Traylor	17M	Chevy									HCY; 16	WKS	ROU	SBO					22nd	58	
2019	David Traylor	12	Chevy	SNM	HCY; 9	ROU	ACE	MMS	LGY	DOM	CCS									36th	38	
2019	David Traylor	5M	Chevy									HCY; 19	ROU	SBO						36th	38	
2023	David Traylor	12M	Chevy	SNM	FLC	HCY	ACE	NWS	LGY	DOM	CRW	HCY; 21	ACE	TCM; 11	WKS	AAS	SBO	TCM	CRW	36th	34	

=== SMART Modified Tour ===
SMART Modified Tour results
Year	Car owner	No.	Make	1	2	3	4	5	6	7	8	9	10	11	12	13	14	SMTC	Pts	Ref
2025	Brother-In-Law Racing	97	N/A	FLO	AND	SBO	ROU	HCY	FCS	CRW	CPS	CAR	CRW	DOM	FCS	TRI; 9	NWS	43rd	32	
2026	Kevin Hughes	14	N/A	FLO; 13	AND; 23	SBO; 14	DOM; 21	HCY; 11	WKS; 16	FCR; 17	CRW; 8	PUL	CAR	ROU	TRI; 16	NWS; 19		15th	252	
