= Mike Darne =

American racing driver

- Born: June 4, 1971 (age 55) Warrenton, Virginia, U.S.

CARS Late Model Stock Tour career
- Debut season: 2015
- Years active: 2015–2016, 2019–2022
- Starts: 15
- Championships: 0
- Wins: 0
- Poles: 0
- Best finish: 23rd in 2015
- Statistics up to date as of April 29, 2026.

Mike Darne (born June 4, 1971) is an American professional stock car racing driver and team owner who previously competed in the CARS Tour from 2015 to 2022. He is the owner of Mike Darne Racing, which competes in late model competition, and has fielded entries for drivers such as Conner Jones, Parker Eatmon, Buddy Isles Jr., and Kaden Honeycutt.

Darne has also competed in the Dirty Dozen Series, the PRA Super Late Model Series, the Virginia Late Model Triple Crown Series, the Paramount Kia Big 10 Challenge, and the NASCAR Weekly Series, and is a former track champion at Southern National Motorsports Park and Old Dominion Speedway.

== Motorsports results ==
=== CARS Late Model Stock Car Tour ===
(key) (Bold – Pole position awarded by qualifying time. Italics – Pole position earned by points standings or practice time. * – Most laps led. ** – All laps led.)

CARS Late Model Stock Car Tour results
| Year | Team | No. | Make | 1 | 2 | 3 | 4 | 5 | 6 | 7 | 8 | 9 | 10 | 11 | 12 | 13 | 14 | 15 | CLMSCTC | Pts | Ref |
|---|---|---|---|---|---|---|---|---|---|---|---|---|---|---|---|---|---|---|---|---|---|
| 2015 | Jim Dean | 99 | Chevy | SNM; 14 | ROU; 22 | HCY; 24 | SNM; 5 | TCM; 25 | MMS | ROU | | | | | | | | | 23rd | 95 | |
| 2015 | Jim Dean | 14 | Chevy | | | | | | | | CON; 13 | MYB | HCY | | | | | | 23rd | 95 | |
| 2016 | Mike Darne Racing | 21 | Chevy | SNM; 11 | ROU | HCY | TCM | GRE | ROU | CON | MYB | HCY | SNM | | | | | | 47th | 22 | |
| 2019 | Mike Darne Racing | 9 | Toyota | SNM | HCY | ROU | ACE | MMS | LGY | DOM | CCS | HCY; 9 | ROU | SBO | | | | | 45th | 24 | |
| 2020 | Mike Darne Racing | 6 | Toyota | SNM; 6 | | | | | | | | | | | | | | | 32nd | 39 | |
| 2020 | Mike Darne Racing | 6 | Chevy | | ACE; Wth | HCY | HCY | DOM | FCS | LGY | CCS | FLO | | | | | | | 32nd | 39 | |
| 2020 | Mike Darne Racing | 54 | Toyota | | | | | | | | | | GRE; 23 | | | | | | 32nd | 39 | |
| 2021 | Mike Darne Racing | 6 | Chevy | DIL | HCY | OCS | ACE | CRW | LGY | DOM | HCY; 22 | | | | | | | | 24th | 50 | |
| 2021 | MAD Motorsports | 24 | Chevy | | | | | | | | | MMS; 16 | TCM | | | | | | 24th | 50 | |
| 2021 | MAD Motorsports | 24 | Toyota | | | | | | | | | | | FLC; 11 | WKS | SBO | | | 24th | 50 | |
| 2022 | Mike Darne Racing | 6 | Chevy | CRW; 32 | HCY; 27 | GRE | AAS | FCS | LGY | DOM | HCY | ACE | MMS | NWS | TCM | | | | 49th | 23 | |
| 2022 | Mike Darne Racing | 1 | Chevy | | | | | | | | | | | | | ACE; 18 | SBO | CRW | 49th | 23 | |

=== CARS Super Late Model Tour ===
(key)

CARS Super Late Model Tour results
| Year | Team | No. | Make | 1 | 2 | 3 | 4 | 5 | 6 | 7 | 8 | 9 | 10 | CSLMTC | Pts | Ref |
|---|---|---|---|---|---|---|---|---|---|---|---|---|---|---|---|---|
| 2016 | Mike Darne Racing | 21 | N/A | SNM | ROU | HCY | TCM | GRE | ROU | CON | MYB | HCY | SNM; 16 | N/A | 0 | |
