= Sam Yarbrough =

American racing driver (born 1984)

- Born: May 3, 1984 (age 42) Myrtle Beach, South Carolina, U.S.

CARS Late Model Stock Tour career
- Debut season: 2015
- Years active: 2015–2016, 2018, 2021
- Starts: 16
- Championships: 0
- Wins: 1
- Poles: 0
- Best finish: 6th in 2021
- Statistics up to date as of April 29, 2026.

Sam Yarbrough (born May 3, 1984) is an American professional stock car racing driver who previously competed in the CARS Tour from 2015 to 2021. He only win in the series came in his debut at Myrtle Beach Speedway.

Yarbrough has also competed in series such as the Virginia Late Model Triple Crown Series, the I-95 Showdown Series, and the NASCAR Weekly Series, and is a former competitor and track champion at the now defunct Myrtle Beach Speedway.

== Motorsports results ==
=== CARS Late Model Stock Car Tour ===
(key) (Bold – Pole position awarded by qualifying time. Italics – Pole position earned by points standings or practice time. * – Most laps led. ** – All laps led.)

CARS Late Model Stock Car Tour results
Year	Team	No.	Make	1	2	3	4	5	6	7	8	9	10	11	12	13	CLMSCTC	Pts	Ref
2015	McCumbee Elliott Racing	20Y	Chevy	SNM	ROU	HCY	SNM	TCM	MMS	ROU	CON	MYB; 1	HCY				35th	34	
2016	McCumbee Elliott Racing	20	N/A	SNM	ROU	HCY	TCM	GRE	ROU	CON	MYB; 3	HCY	SNM				33rd	32	
2018	McCumbee Elliott Racing	20	Chevy	TCM	MYB; 8	ROU	HCY	BRI	ACE	CCS	KPT	HCY	WKS	ROU	SBO		43rd	25	
2021	McCumbee Elliott Racing	95	Chevy	DIL; 6	HCY; 16	OCS; 9	ACE; 11	CRW; 6	LGY; 7	DOM; 9	HCY; 3	MMS; 7	TCM; 2	FLC; 12	WKS; 8	SBO; 23	6th	311	
