= Stacy Puryear =

American racing driver

- Born: September 10, 1970 (age 56); South Boston, Virginia, U.S.

NASCAR O'Reilly Auto Parts Series career
- 1 race run over 1 year
- Best finish: N/A (1997)
- First race: 1997 Winston Motorsports 300 (South Boston)
Wins	Top tens	Poles
0	0	0
- Statistics up to date as of October 21, 2025.

Stacy Puryear (born September 10, 1970) is an American professional stock car racing driver. He has previously competed in the NASCAR Busch Series and the CARS Tour.

Puryear has also previously competed in series such as the Virginia Late Model Triple Crown Series, the UARA STARS Late Model Series, and the NASCAR Weekly Series,

== Motorsports results ==
=== NASCAR ===
(key) (Bold – Pole position awarded by qualifying time. Italics – Pole position earned by points standings or practice time. * – Most laps led.)

==== Busch Series ====
NASCAR Busch Series results
Year	Team	No.	Make	1	2	3	4	5	6	7	8	9	10	11	12	13	14	15	16	17	18	19	20	21	22	23	24	25	26	27	28	29	30	NBSC	Pts	Ref
1997	Dick Bown	51	Chevy	DAY	CAR	RCH	ATL	LVS	DAR	HCY	TEX	BRI	NSV	TAL	NHA	NZH	CLT	DOV	SBO; 26	GLN	MLW	MYB	GTY	IRP	MCH	BRI	DAR	RCH	DOV	CLT	CAL	CAR	HOM	N/A	0	

=== CARS Late Model Stock Car Tour ===
(key) (Bold – Pole position awarded by qualifying time. Italics – Pole position earned by points standings or practice time. * – Most laps led. ** – All laps led.)

CARS Late Model Stock Car Tour results
Year	Team	No.	Make	1	2	3	4	5	6	7	8	9	10	11	12	13	14	15	16	CLMSCTC	Pts	Ref
2015	Stacy Puryear	17	Chevy	SNM; 29	ROU; 23	HCY; 17	SNM	TCM	MMS	ROU	CON	MYB	HCY							39th	30	
2016	Puryear Motorsports	17P	Chevy	SNM	ROU	HCY	TCM	GRE	ROU	CON	MYB	HCY	SNM; 15							50th	18	
2017	Jimmy Mooring	17	Chevy	CON	DOM	DOM	HCY	HCY	BRI	AND	ROU	TCM	ROU	HCY	CON	SBO; 2				37th	31	
2018	Jimmy Mooring	17	Chevy	TCM	MYB	ROU	HCY	BRI	ACE	CCS	KPT	HCY	WKS	ROU	SBO; 11					51st	22	
2019	Jimmy Mooring	17	Chevy	SNM; 8	HCY; 10	ROU; 11	ACE; 10	MMS; 13	LGY; 8	DOM; 14	CCS; 18	HCY	ROU	SBO						14th	172	
2020	Stacy Puryear	17P	Chevy	SNM	ACE	HCY	HCY	DOM	FCS; 9											23rd	65	
2020	Stacy Puryear	17	Chevy							LGY; 15	CCS; 10	FLO	GRE							23rd	65	
2023	N/A	17	Chevy	SNM	FLC	HCY	ACE	NWS	LGY	DOM	CRW	HCY	ACE	TCM	WKS	AAS	SBO; 28	TCM	CRW	87th	5	
