= 2017 CARS Tour =

21st season of the CARS Tour

The 2017 CARS Tour was the 21st season of the CARS Tour, a stock car racing series. It began at Concord Speedway on March 11 and ended at South Boston Speedway on October 14. Josh Berry won the Late Model Stock Tour championship, while Cole Rouse won the Super Late Model Tour championship.

Deac McCaskill entered the season as the defending Late Model Stock Tour champion, while Raphaël Lessard entered as the defending Super Late Model Tour champion.

== Schedule & results ==
Date	Track	Location	LMSC Winner	SLM Winner
March 11	Concord Speedway	Concord, North Carolina	Josh Berry	Harrison Burton
March 25	Dominion Raceway	Thornburg, Virginia	Layne Riggs	Brandon Setzer
March 25	Dominion Raceway	Thornburg, Virginia	Jared Fryar	Brandon Setzer
May 6	Hickory Motor Speedway	Hickory, North Carolina	Anthony Alfredo	Matt Craig
May 6	Hickory Motor Speedway	Hickory, North Carolina	Anthony Alfredo	Raphaël Lessard
May 21	Bristol Motor Speedway	Bristol, Tennessee	Myatt Snider	Bubba Wallace
June 10	Anderson Motor Speedway	Anderson, South Carolina	Josh Berry	Bubba Pollard
June 24	Orange County Speedway	Rougemont, North Carolina	Layne Riggs	Cole Rouse
July 8	Tri-County Motor Speedway	Hudson, North Carolina	Josh Berry	Matt Craig
July 22	Orange County Speedway	Rougemont, North Carolina	Deac McCaskill	Steve Wallace
August 5	Hickory Motor Speedway	Hickory, North Carolina	Justin Carroll	Tate Fogleman
August 26	Concord Speedway	Concord, North Carolina	Josh Berry	Cole Rouse
October 14	South Boston Speedway	South Boston, Virginia	Deac McCaskill	Stephen Nasse

== Standings ==
=== Late Model Stock Car championship ===
(key) Bold – Pole position awarded by time. Italics – Pole position set by final practice results or rainout. * – Most laps led.

Pos	Driver	CON	DOM	DOM	HCY	HCY	BRI	AND	ROU	TCM	ROU	HCY	CON	SBO	Points
1	Josh Berry	**1****	10	16	**21***	**2***	12	1*	**3**	1	**3**	16	1*	10	351
2	Anthony Alfredo	24	4	4	1	1	6	4	5	5	6	2	17	9	344
3	Layne Riggs	3	1	2	6	6	14	8	1**	11	5	**10***	8	21	342
4	Deac McCaskill	5	2	11	3	4	28		2	4	1*	11	**3**	1*	329
5	Brandon Grosso	13	14	**3**	9	8	16	17	14	3*	8	4	2		287
6	Ronald Hill	6	8	14	19	13	24	9	7	15	2	12	14	20	265
7	Chris Hudspeth	11	3	7	16	15	19	10	8	16	9	14	18		249
8	Jared Fryar		5	1	10	21	2	5	6		4	13	16		249
9	Justin Johnson	4	7	5	20	5	26	3	11	10	13	17			241
10	Chris Davis	12	6	9	15	14	11	11	15	20	18		13	14	237
11	Evan Swilling	DNS	16	8	8	16	21	7	12	18		21	20		182
12	Austin McDaniel	2			2	3				13		3	6		174
13	Myatt Snider	7	**11***	15			**1***		9	12	10				171
14	Ty Gibbs				12	12		2		14	12	19	12	11	170
15	Craig Stallard	10	13	13	14	9	30	15					7	17	168
16	Craig Moore	19			22	DNS			4	**6**	16	22		5	149
17	Ryan Repko							**6**			7	5	10	6	133
18	Tommy Lemons Jr.						20		16	9	15	18	4		116
19	Stefan Parsons	15			11	19			10		11	20			112
20	Dexter Canipe Jr.				7	10				7		6			102
21	Cody Haskins	9						12				8	5		100
22	Justin Carroll	9								8		1	19		97
23	Landon Huffman				5	11		13				9			94
24	Trevor Rizzo	16	12	10	18	20									88
25	B. J. Mackey				4	7									55
26	Annabeth Barnes				17	17						15			50
27	Grayson Cullather		9	6											50
28	Danny O'Quinn Jr.						25					7	21		46
29	Justin Crider						3			19					44
30	Justin Hicks						9				14				43
31	Matt Bowling						7							18	42
32	Hayden Woods				13	18	29								39
33	Michael Hardin		15	12											38
34	Terry Brooks Jr.	20											9		37
35	Terry Dease								13		19				34
36	Garrett Campbell									2					32
37	Stacy Puryear													2	31
38	Timothy Peters													3	30
39	Bobby McCarty													4	29
40	Robert Tyler	23						14				DSQ			29
41	Travis Swaim						4								29
42	Ricky Jones						5								28
43	Blake Stallings													7	26
44	Jake Crum													8	25
45	Paul Nogradi Jr.						8								25
46	Bradley McCaskill						DNQ						11		24
47	Brandon Rogers						10								23
48	Grayson Massey						27		17						22
49	Brandon Pierce													12	21
50	J. R. Courage						13								20
51	Trevor Ward													13	20
52	Davin Scites	14													19
53	Philip Morris													**16**	19
54	Andrew Garcia												15		18
55	Mike Jones													15	18
56	Paul Wark						15								18
57	J. P. Dyar							16							17
58	Chris Denny										17				16
59	Jeffrey Oakley	17	DSQ	DSQ*											16
60	Matt Leicht									17					16
61	Mike Chambers						17								16
62	C. E. Falk	18													15
63	William Lester						18								15
64	Kyle Barnes													19	14
65	Logan Jones	21													13
66	Colby Howard	22													11
67	Taylor Coffman						22								11
68	Thomas Beane													22	11
69	Nate Monteith						23								10
70	Ryan Wilson						DNQ								1
71	Sheflon Clay						DNQ								1
Pos	Driver	CON	DOM	DOM	HCY	HCY	BRI	AND	ROU	TCM	ROU	HCY	CON	SBO	Points

=== Super Late Model championship ===
(key) Bold – Pole position awarded by time. Italics – Pole position set by final practice results or rainout. * – Most laps led.

Pos	Driver	CON	DOM	DOM	HCY	HCY	BRI	AND	ROU	TCM	ROU	HCY	CON	SBO	Points
1	Cole Rouse	3	6	DNS	11	2	7		1	6	**3***	18	1*	10	328
2	Brandon Setzer	7	**1***	**1****	**5***	**4**		14	15	2	17	3	8	**12**	321
3	Matt Craig	4*			1	6		**6**	**3***	**1***	2	**2***	5	2	313
4	Nolan Pope	12	5	3	6	11	24	15	7	9	11	11	6	13	296
5	Tate Fogleman	18			2	3			4	4	6	1		7	223
6	Mike Speeney		8	5	7	10				10	13	10		4	187
7	Christian Eckes	2	3	7				2					3	11*	173
8	Jeff Batten				8	8			14		10	8	9	9	165
9	Lucas Jones	6			3	5		16	16		14				140
10	Raphaël Lessard				4	1*	**15**	DNS			9			5	135
11	Tyler Ankrum	10					8			7		5			125
12	Tyler Church				9	9				5		6	13		123
13	Chase Purdy		2	2			9				7				113
14	Steve Wallace	**15**					5				1				81
15	Matt Wallace										8	9	4		78
16	Dan Speeney	13						23	9				12		75
17	Matt Thomas									8		13	7		71
18	Stephen Nasse						4	12			18			1	70
19	Cole Timm	5										16	11		68
20	Kodie Conner				10	7					15				67
21	Bradley McCaskill								10		19	7			63
22	Chad McCumbee		7	6				24							62
23	Jake Crum						2			3				6	59
24	Bubba Pollard							1			5	4			58
25	Quin Houff		4	4											58
26	Zane Smith	8												3	56
27	Spencer Davis	16									4				46
28	David Calabrese							11	12						43
29	Hailie Deegan									11		14			41
30	Trevor Noles						32		11		16				39
31	John Gustafson							DNS		12		19			35
32	Harrison Burton	1													34
33	Jody Measamer								13		20				33
34	Preston Peltier												**2**		33
35	Casey Roderick							3*	2						31
36	Jason Stanley								5						28
37	Spencer Wauters								6						28
38	Jared Fryar													8	26
39	Gracie Trotter								8						25
40	Gus Dean	9													24
41	Austin Theriault	11													22
42	Christopher Bell										12				21
43	Garrett Jones						6	4				12			21
44	Austin Thaxton	14													19
45	Riley Thornton											15			18
46	Roy Hayes							18				17			16
47	Spencer Bayston	17													16
48	Jerry White	19													14
49	Jared Irvan							22			21				12
50	Blake Jones						23								10
51	Joe Graf Jr.	DNQ													1
52	Augie Grill						DNS								
53	Chandler Smith						3	10							
54	Cole Anderson						27								
55	Connor Okrzesik						13	8							
56	Dalton Armstrong						11								
57	Daniel Webster						29								
58	Bubba Wallace						1*								
59	Dennis Schoenfeld						33								
60	Derek Scott Jr.							13							
61	Eddie VanMeter						17								
62	Erik Darnell						DNS								
63	Hunter Jack						28								
64	Jason Timmerman						DNS								
65	Jeff Firestine						20								
66	Jimmy Doyle							19							
67	Joe Beaver						35								
68	Joey Mucciacciaro						12								
69	John Beale						19								
70	John Coffman						21								
71	Jordan McCallum							17							
72	Josh Brock						25								
73	Kyle McCallum							20							
74	Kyle Plott						10	5							
75	Logan Runyon						16								
76	Nathan Davis						26								
77	Nick Leitz						DNS								
78	Noah Gragson						**30**								
79	Paul Kelley						14	7							
80	R. S. Senter							21							
81	Robby Lyons						18								
82	Scotty Ellis							9							
83	Tommy St. John						31								
84	Travis Braden						22								
85	Wes Griffith						34								
Pos	Driver	CON	DOM	DOM	HCY	HCY	BRI	AND	ROU	TCM	ROU	HCY	CON	SBO	Points

== See also ==
- 2017 Monster Energy NASCAR Cup Series
- 2017 NASCAR Xfinity Series
- 2017 NASCAR Camping World Truck Series
- 2017 NASCAR K&N Pro Series East
- 2017 NASCAR K&N Pro Series West
- 2017 NASCAR Whelen Modified Tour
- 2017 NASCAR Pinty's Series
- 2017 NASCAR PEAK Mexico Series
- 2017 NASCAR Whelen Euro Series
