= Stefan Parsons =

American racing driver (born 1998)

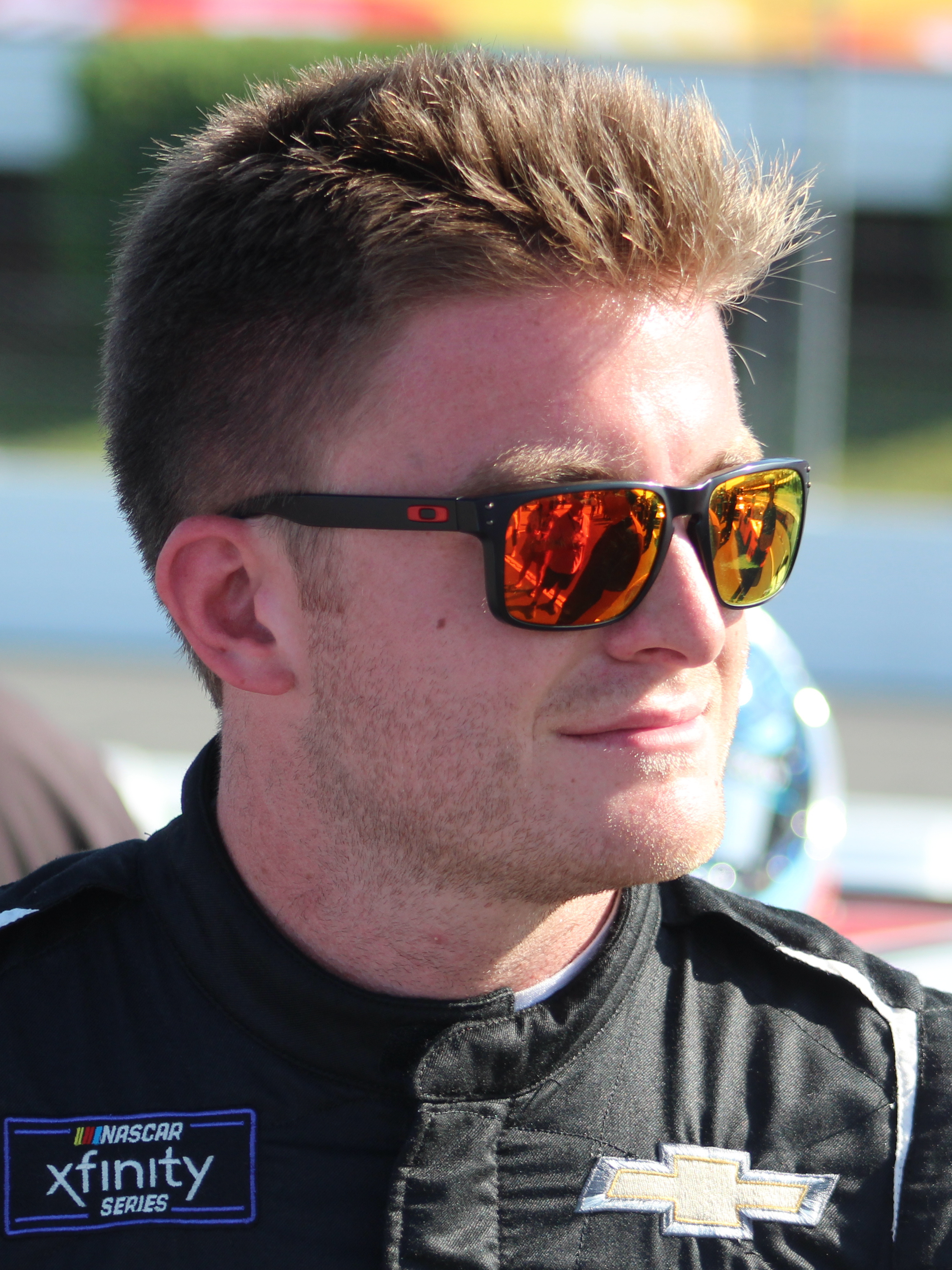
- Parsons at Pocono Raceway in 2022
- Born: Stefan Charles Parsons; June 15, 1998 (age 28); Cornelius, North Carolina, U.S.

NASCAR O'Reilly Auto Parts Series career
- 71 races run over 7 years
- 2026 position: 86th
- Best finish: 36th (2020)
- First race: 2019 Circle K Firecracker 250 (Daytona)
- Last race: 2026 Food City 300 (Bristol)
Wins	Top tens	Poles
0	1	0

NASCAR FedEx Freight Truck Series career
- 29 races run over 8 years
- 2026 position: 69th
- Best finish: 26th (2024)
- First race: 2018 UNOH 200 (Bristol)
- Last race: 2026 Allegiance 200 (Nashville)
Wins	Top tens	Poles
0	3	0

ARCA Menards Series career
- 1 race run over 1 year
- Best finish: 77th (2019)
- First race: 2019 Bounty 150 (Chicagoland)
Wins	Top tens	Poles
0	0	0

ARCA Menards Series East career
- 1 race run over 1 year
- Best finish: 42nd (2019)
- First race: 2019 General Tire 125 (Dover)
Wins	Top tens	Poles
0	0	0
- Statistics up to date as of November 7, 2026.

Stefan Charles Parsons (born June 15, 1998) is an American professional stock car racing driver and spotter. He last competed part-time in the NASCAR Craftsman Truck Series, driving the No. 4 Chevrolet Silverado RST for Niece Motorsports, and part-time in the NASCAR O'Reilly Auto Parts Series, driving the No. 91 Chevrolet Camaro SS for DGM Racing with Jesse Iwuji Motorsports. He is also the spotter for the No. 88 Trackhouse car in the NASCAR Cup Series driven by Connor Zilisch. He has also previously competed in the ARCA Menards Series and the CARS Tour.

== Racing career ==
=== Early career ===
Parsons began racing at the age of twelve after his father Phil received encouragement from Ken Ragan.

=== CARS Late Model Stock Tour ===
Parsons began racing in the CARS Tour in 2015, where he drove the No. 98 Ford for his father's team, Phil Parsons Racing, in five of the races.

Parsons returned to the car in 2016, this time participating in eight of the ten races and finishing twelfth in the overall points standings.

In 2017, Parsons drove the same car in six races, though the last one was in the No. 55 Ford.

=== Craftsman Truck Series ===
Parsons made his NASCAR debut in the Truck Series in 2018, where he drove the No. 15 Chevrolet Silverado for Premium Motorsports at Bristol. He finished seventeenth after starting 30th. He would later return to the team for the Phoenix race, where he finished twentieth after starting 24th.

In 2019, Parsons drove the No. 1 Chevrolet for Beaver Motorsports at Las Vegas. At Charlotte, he drove the No. 49 for CMI Motorsports with a paint scheme honoring the victims of the 2019 University of North Carolina at Charlotte shooting.

Parsons returned to CMI in 2020, driving a second No. 83 truck at Las Vegas.

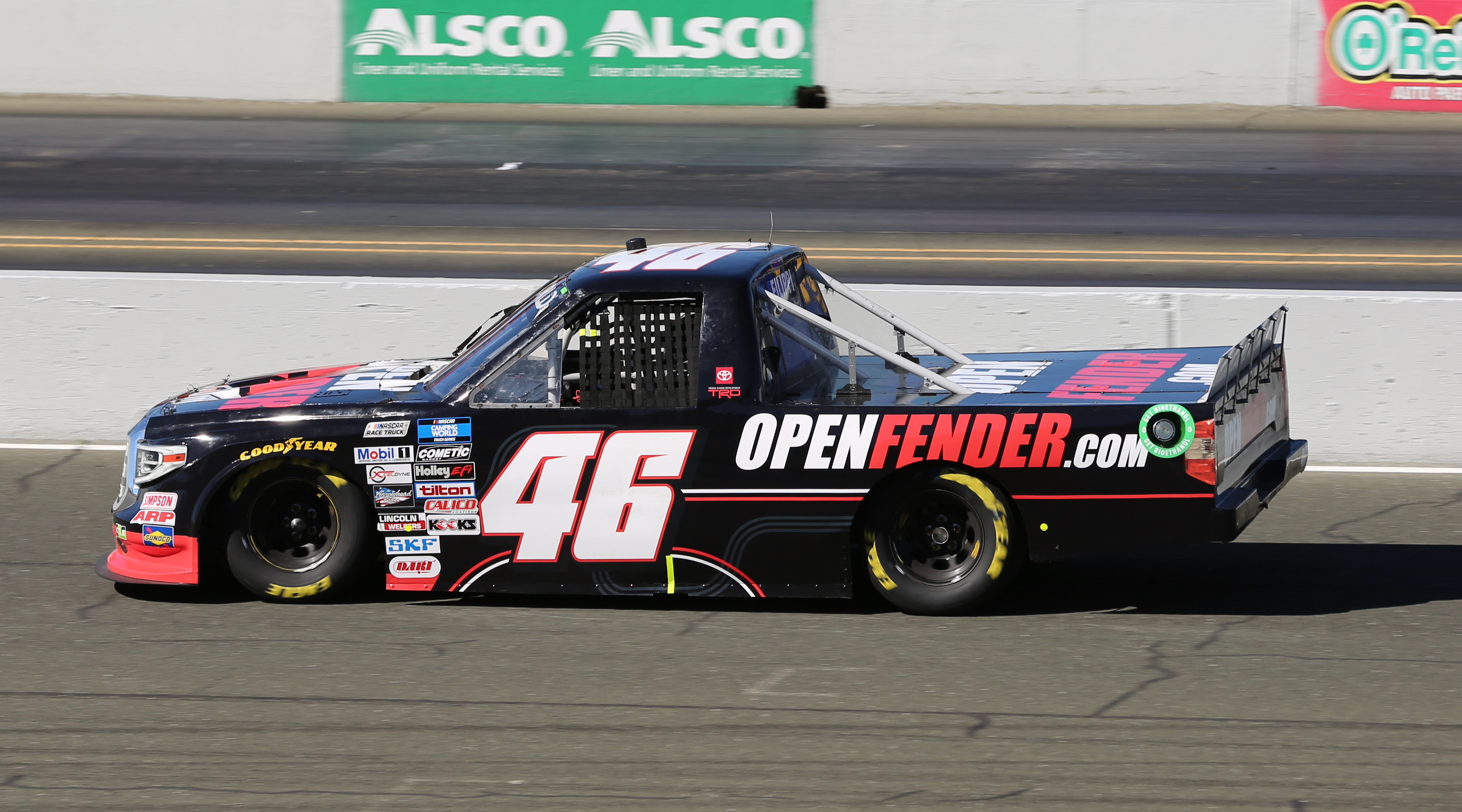
Parsons' No. 46 truck at Sonoma Raceway in 2022

After not running any Truck Series races in 2021, Parsons returned to the series in 2022 in the race at Sonoma as a last-minute replacement driver for G2G Racing. Mason Filippi and Travis McCullough were both scheduled to attempt to make their Truck Series debuts at Sonoma in the team's Nos. 46 and 47 trucks, respectively. However, on June 10, McCullough had to be replaced due to his drug test results not coming in in time for practice. (As it was his first start of the season, he had to take a drug test beforehand.) Parsons was announced as McCullough's replacement in the No. 47 truck for qualifying. However, on June 11, the team decided to move Parsons from the No. 47 and replacing McCullough to the No. 46 and replacing Filippi in qualifying and the race due to Filippi not adjusting to the truck well enough in practice. The No. 47 truck was withdrawn. Parsons then drove the No. 20 for Young's Motorsports in the races at Nashville and Homestead-Miami.

In 2023, Parsons returned to Young's Motorsports to practice and qualify their No. 12 truck for the race at Circuit of the Americas after Spencer Boyd was late to arrive at the track due to his plane flight being delayed. Parsons was able to qualify the No. 12 truck into the race on Friday and Boyd drove it in the race on Saturday. Parsons would then drive the team's No. 20 truck in the Bristol dirt race and their No. 02 truck at Pocono. On October 19, it was announced that Parsons would drive the No. 25 truck for Rackley W.A.R. in the Truck Series season-finale at Phoenix.

=== Xfinity Series ===
In July 2019, Parsons ran his first NASCAR Xfinity Series race in the Circle K Firecracker 250 at Daytona International Speedway for B. J. McLeod Motorsports. Later in the year at the Charlotte Roval, he relieved Cody Ware mid-race when Ware was feeling unwell due to a damaged coolbox in his car.

Parsons ran nine races in 2020 with a best finish of eighteenth at Texas Motor Speedway. He returned to BJMM and the No. 99 for another part-time schedule in 2021.

On September 21, 2021, BJMM announced that Parsons would be driving full-time in the No. 99 for the team in 2022, with sponsorship from Sokal Digital and Springrates Automotive. However, he was reduced to an unknown amount of races, including one race in the No. 5 car, due to the No. 78 taking owner points from the No. 99. In addition, he would compete in Alpha Prime Racing's No. 45 for an excessive amount of races, which would be the first time he drove a team other than McLeod's team since 2019, in which he drove for JD Motorsports.

In 2023, Parsons would run part-time in the Xfinity Series again, primarily driving for SS-Green Light Racing. However, he did still run two races for APR, the season-opener at Daytona in the No. 45 as a replacement for co-owner Caesar Bacarella who got sick after qualifying, and at Watkins Glen in the No. 44.

In 2024, Parsons competed for Alpha Prime at Bristol night race, driving the No. 45 Chevrolet.

== Personal life ==
Parsons is the son of Phil Parsons and the nephew of Benny Parsons.

Parsons is the twin brother to Cami Creed, fellow NASCAR driver Sheldon Creed’s wife.

== Motorsports career results ==
=== Racing career summary ===
Season	Series	Team	Races	Wins	Top 5	Top 10	Points	Position
2015	CARS Late Model Stock Car Tour	Phil Parsons	6	0	0	0	70	26th
2016	CARS Late Model Stock Car Tour	Phil Parsons	8	0	1	2	152	12th
2017	CARS Late Model Stock Car Tour	Phil Parsons	6	0	0	1	112	19th
2018	NASCAR Camping World Truck Series	Premium Motorsports	2	0	0	0	37	57th
2019	NASCAR K&N Pro Series East	Kart Idaho Racing	1	0	0	0	30	42nd
2019	ARCA Menards Series	KBR Development	1	0	0	0	130	77th
2019	NASCAR Gander Outdoors Truck Series	Beaver Motorsports	1	0	0	0	0	NC†
2019	NASCAR Gander Outdoors Truck Series	CMI Motorsports	1	0	0	0	0	NC†
2019	NASCAR Xfinity Series	B. J. McLeod Motorsports	5	0	0	0	106	38th
2019	NASCAR Xfinity Series	JD Motorsports	1	0	0	0	106	38th
2020	NASCAR Gander Outdoors Truck Series	CMI Motorsports	1	0	0	0	0	NC†
2020	NASCAR Xfinity Series	B. J. McLeod Motorsports	9	0	0	0	119	36th
2021	NASCAR Xfinity Series	B. J. McLeod Motorsports	10	0	0	0	119	38th
2022	CARS Late Model Stock Car Tour	N/A	1	0	0	1	24	48th
2022	NASCAR Camping World Truck Series	G2G Racing	3	0	0	0	26	50th
2022	NASCAR Xfinity Series	B. J. McLeod Motorsports	12	0	0	0	0	NC†
2022	NASCAR Xfinity Series	Alpha Prime Racing	12	0	0	1	0	NC†
2023	NASCAR Craftsman Truck Series	Young's Motorsports	2	0	0	0	7	74th
2023	NASCAR Craftsman Truck Series	Rackley W. A. R.	1	0	0	0	7	74th
2023	NASCAR Xfinity Series	Alpha Prime Racing	2	0	0	0	0	NC†
2023	NASCAR Xfinity Series	SS-Green Light Racing	12	0	0	0	0	NC†
2023	NASCAR Xfinity Series	DGM Racing	0	0	0	0	0	NC†
2023	NASCAR Xfinity Series	JD Motorsports	1	0	0	0	0	NC†
2024	NASCAR Craftsman Truck Series	Henderson Motorsports	10	0	0	3	229	26th
2024	NASCAR Craftsman Truck Series	Niece Motorsports	1	0	0	0	229	26th
2024	NASCAR Xfinity Series	Alpha Prime Racing	2	0	0	0	0	NC†
2025	NASCAR Craftsman Truck Series	Young's Motorsports	5	0	0	0	123	30th
2025	NASCAR Craftsman Truck Series	Spire Motorsports	1	0	0	0	123	30th
2025	NASCAR Xfinity Series	Alpha Prime Racing	1	0	0	0	0	NC†
2025	NASCAR Xfinity Series	Joey Gase Motorsports	2	0	0	0	0	NC†
2026	NASCAR Craftsman Truck Series	Niece Motorsports	1	0	0	0	19	69th
2026	NASCAR O'Reilly Auto Parts Series	DGM Racing	1	0	0	0	0	NC†

^{†} As Parsons was a guest driver, he was ineligible for championship points.

=== NASCAR ===
(key) (Bold – Pole position awarded by qualifying time. Italics – Pole position earned by points standings or practice time. * – Most laps led.)

==== O'Reilly Auto Parts Series ====
NASCAR O'Reilly Auto Parts Series results
Year	Team	No.	Make	1	2	3	4	5	6	7	8	9	10	11	12	13	14	15	16	17	18	19	20	21	22	23	24	25	26	27	28	29	30	31	32	33	NOAPSC	Pts	Ref
2019	B. J. McLeod Motorsports	99	Toyota	DAY	ATL	LVS	PHO	CAL	TEX	BRI	RCH	TAL	DOV	CLT	POC	MCH	IOW	CHI	DAY; 12	KEN	NHA	IOW; 21	GLN	MOH	BRI	ROA	DAR; 22	IND; 19	LVS	RCH		DOV; 19	KAN				38th	106	
2019	B. J. McLeod Motorsports	99	Chevy																												ROV; RL^{†}						38th	106	
2019	JD Motorsports	15	Chevy																															TEX; 23	PHO	HOM	38th	106	
2020	B. J. McLeod Motorsports	99	Toyota	DAY	LVS	CAL	PHO	DAR	CLT	BRI	ATL	HOM; 22	HOM; 32	TAL	POC; 21	IRC	KEN	KEN	TEX; 18	KAN	ROA	DRC	DOV; 26	DOV; 28	DAY	DAR	RCH	RCH							MAR; 24	PHO	36th	119	
2020	B. J. McLeod Motorsports	78	Toyota																										BRI; 23	LVS; 20	TAL	ROV	KAN	TEX			36th	119	
2021	B. J. McLeod Motorsports	99	Chevy	DAY; 13	DRC		LVS; 36										TEX; 35																			PHO; 34	38th	119	
2021	B. J. McLeod Motorsports	99	Toyota			HOM; 31		PHO; 18	ATL	MAR; 20	TAL	DAR	DOV	COA				NSH; 36	POC	ROA	ATL	NHA	GLN	IRC	MCH	DAY	DAR	RCH									38th	119	
2021	B. J. McLeod Motorsports	76	Chevy												CLT; 23	MOH																					38th	119	
2021	B. J. McLeod Motorsports	5	Toyota																										BRI; 22	LVS	TAL						38th	119	
2021	B. J. McLeod Motorsports	78	Chevy																													ROV; 24	TEX	KAN	MAR		38th	119	
2022	B. J. McLeod Motorsports	99	Chevy	DAY; DNQ	CAL; 30	LVS; 33	PHO; 21	ATL; 25	COA; 21	RCH; 35	MAR; 28	TAL	DOV; 30	DAR; 20																							89th	0^{1}	
2022	Alpha Prime Racing	45	Chevy												TEX; 17	CLT; 30	PIR; 24	NSH; 15	ROA	ATL	NHA						DAR; 17		BRI; 8	TEX; 13	TAL	ROV; 25	LVS; 23	HOM; 34		PHO; 28	89th	0^{1}	
2022	B. J. McLeod Motorsports	5	Chevy																			POC; 23	IRC	MCH													89th	0^{1}	
2022	Alpha Prime Racing	44	Chevy																						GLN; 12	DAY											89th	0^{1}	
2022	B. J. McLeod Motorsports	78	Chevy																									KAN; 26							MAR; 31		89th	0^{1}	
2023	Alpha Prime Racing	45	Chevy	DAY; 13	CAL	LVS	PHO	ATL	COA																												91st	0^{1}	
2023	SS-Green Light Racing	07	Chevy							RCH; 32	MAR	TAL	DOV; 28	DAR; 22	CLT; 26	PIR; 37	SON	NSH; 38	CSC	ATL	NHA; 36	POC; DNQ		MCH; 31	IRC			DAR; 19	KAN	BRI; 19							91st	0^{1}	
2023	SS-Green Light Racing	08	Ford																				ROA; QL^{‡}														91st	0^{1}	
2023	DGM Racing	92	Chevy																												TEX; RL^{±}						91st	0^{1}	
2023	Alpha Prime Racing	44	Chevy																							GLN; 33	DAY										91st	0^{1}	
2023	SS-Green Light Racing	08	Chevy																													ROV; 18	LVS; 26	HOM	MAR		91st	0^{1}	
2023	JD Motorsports	4	Chevy																																	PHO; 33	91st	0^{1}	
2024	Alpha Prime Racing	45	Chevy	DAY	ATL	LVS	PHO	COA	RCH	MAR	TEX	TAL	DOV	DAR	CLT	PIR	SON	IOW	NHA	NSH	CSC	POC	IND	MCH	DAY	DAR	ATL	GLN	BRI; 33	KAN	TAL	ROV	LVS	HOM	MAR	PHO; 38	106th	0^{1}	
2025	Alpha Prime Racing	45	Chevy	DAY	ATL	COA	PHO	LVS	HOM	MAR	DAR	BRI	CAR	TAL	TEX	CLT	NSH	MXC	POC	ATL	CSC	SON	DOV	IND	IOW	GLN; 19	DAY	PIR	GTW								93rd	0^{1}	
2025	Joey Gase Motorsports with Scott Osteen	35	Chevy																											BRI; 36	KAN	ROV	LVS	TAL	MAR	PHO; 29	93rd	0^{1}	
2026	DGM Racing with Jesse Iwuji Motorsports	91	Chevy	DAY	ATL	COA	PHO	LVS	DAR	MAR	CAR	BRI	KAN	TAL	TEX	GLN	DOV	CLT	NSH	POC	COR	SON	CHI	ATL	IND	IOW	DAY	DAR	GTW	BRI; 21	LVS	CLT	PHO	TAL	MAR	HOM	86th	0^{1}	
^{†} – Relieved Cody Ware · ^{‡} – Qualified for Alex Labbé · ^{±} – Relieved Josh Williams

==== Craftsman Truck Series ====
NASCAR Craftsman Truck Series results
Year	Team	No.	Make	1	2	3	4	5	6	7	8	9	10	11	12	13	14	15	16	17	18	19	20	21	22	23	24	25	NCTC	Pts	Ref
2018	Premium Motorsports	15	Chevy	DAY	ATL	LVS	MAR	DOV	KAN	CLT	TEX	IOW	GTW	CHI	KEN	ELD	POC	MCH	BRI; 17	MSP	LVS	TAL	MAR	TEX	PHO; 20	HOM			57th	37	
2019	Beaver Motorsports	1	Chevy	DAY	ATL	LVS; 31	MAR	TEX	DOV	KAN																			110th	0^{1}	
2019	CMI Motorsports	49	Chevy								CLT; 24	TEX	IOW	GTW	CHI	KEN	POC	ELD	MCH	BRI	MSP	LVS	TAL	MAR	PHO	HOM			110th	0^{1}	
2020	CMI Motorsports	83	Chevy	DAY	LVS; 29	CLT	ATL	HOM	POC	KEN	TEX	KAN	KAN	MCH	DRC	DOV	GTW	DAR	RCH	BRI	LVS	TAL	KAN	TEX	MAR	PHO			93rd	0^{1}	
2022	G2G Racing	46	Toyota	DAY	LVS	ATL	COA	MAR	BRD	DAR	KAN	TEX	CLT	GTW	SON; 36	KNX													50th	26	
2022	Young's Motorsports	20	Chevy														NSH; 22	MOH	POC	IRP	RCH	KAN	BRI	TAL	HOM; 26	PHO			50th	26	
2023	Young's Motorsports	12	Chevy	DAY	LVS	ATL	COA; QL^{†}	TEX																					74th	7	
2023	Young's Motorsports	20	Chevy						BRD; 36	MAR	KAN	DAR	NWS	CLT	GTW	NSH	MOH												74th	7	
2023	Young's Motorsports	02	Chevy															POC; 28	RCH	IRP	MLW	KAN	BRI	TAL	HOM				74th	7	
2023	Rackley W.A.R.	25	Chevy																							PHO; 30			74th	7	
2024	Henderson Motorsports	75	Chevy	DAY; 6	ATL	LVS	BRI; 18	COA; 19	MAR	TEX; 9	KAN	DAR	NWS; 17	CLT; 25	GTW	NSH; 26	POC	IRP	RCH; 11	MLW	BRI; 16	KAN	TAL; 8	HOM	MAR				26th	229	
2024	Niece Motorsports	44	Chevy																							PHO; 23			26th	229	
2025	Young's Motorsports	20	Chevy	DAY	ATL	LVS	HOM; 18	MAR	BRI	CAR	TEX; 12	KAN	NWS									DAR; 15	BRI; 25	NHA	ROV	TAL	MAR		30th	123	
2025	Young's Motorsports	02	Chevy											CLT; 22	NSH	MCH	POC	LRP	IRP	GLN	RCH								30th	123	
2025	Spire Motorsports	7	Chevy																									PHO; 12	30th	123	
2026	Niece Motorsports	4	Chevy	DAY	ATL	STP	DAR	CAR	BRI	TEX	GLN	DOV	CLT	NSH; 18	MCH	COR	LRP	NWS	IRP	RCH	NHA	BRI	KAN	CLT	PHO	TAL	MAR	HOM	69th	19	
^{†} – Qualified for Spencer Boyd

^{*} Season still in progress
^{1} Ineligible for series points

=== ARCA Menards Series ===
(key) (Bold – Pole position awarded by qualifying time. Italics – Pole position earned by points standings or practice time. * – Most laps led.)

ARCA Menards Series results
Year	Team	No.	Make	1	2	3	4	5	6	7	8	9	10	11	12	13	14	15	16	17	18	19	20	AMSC	Pts	Ref
2019	KBR Development	28	Chevy	DAY	FIF	SLM	TAL	NSH	TOL	CLT	POC	MCH	MAD	GTW	CHI; 20	ELK	IOW	POC	ISF	DSF	SLM	IRP	KAN	77th	130	

==== K&N Pro Series East ====
NASCAR K&N Pro Series East results
Year	Team	No.	Make	1	2	3	4	5	6	7	8	9	10	11	12	NKNPSEC	Pts	Ref
2019	Kart Idaho Racing	38	Chevy	NSM	BRI	SBO	SBO	MEM	NHA	IOW	GLN	BRI	GTW	NHA	DOV; 14	42nd	30	

=== CARS Late Model Stock Car Tour ===
(key) (Bold – Pole position awarded by qualifying time. Italics – Pole position earned by points standings or practice time. * – Most laps led. ** – All laps led.)

CARS Late Model Stock Car Tour results
Year	Team	No.	Make	1	2	3	4	5	6	7	8	9	10	11	12	13	14	15	CLMSCTC	Pts	Ref
2015	Phil Parsons	98	Chevy	SNM; DNQ	ROU; 24	HCY; 18	SNM	TCM; 22	MMS; 14	ROU; 18	CON	MYB; 28	HCY						26th	70	
2016	Phil Parsons	98	Ford	SNM; 26	ROU; 22	HCY; 12	TCM; 5	GRE; 12	ROU; 15*	CON; 10	MYB; 12	HCY	SNM						12th	152	
2017	Phil Parsons	98	Ford	CON; 15	DOM	DOM	HCY; 11	HCY; 19	BRI	AND	ROU; 10	TCM	ROU; 11						19th	112	
2017	Phil Parsons	55	Ford											HCY; 20	CON	SBO			19th	112	
2022	N/A	21	Chevy	CRW	HCY	GRE	AAS	FCS	LGY	DOM	HCY	ACE	MMS	NWS; 9	TCM	ACE	SBO	CRW	48th	24	
