= 2015 CARS Tour =

19th season of the CARS Tour

The 2015 CARS Tour was the 19th season of the CARS Tour, a stock car racing series. It began at Southern National Motorsports Park on March 28 and ended at Hickory Motor Speedway on October 31. Brayton Haws won the Late Model Stock Tour championship, while Cole Timm won the Super Late Model Tour championship.

This was the first season under the CARS Tour moniker after the series absorbed the now-defunct UARA-STARS Late Model Series. Alongside this, this was the first season to feature the Super Late Model Tour.

Caleb Holman entered the year as the series' Late Model Stock champion.

== Schedule & results ==
Date	Track	Location	LMSC Winner	SLM Winner
March 28	Southern National Motorsports Park	Kenly, North Carolina	Todd Gilliland	Cole Timm
April 18	Orange County Speedway	Rougemont, North Carolina	Brayton Haws	Christopher Bell
May 9	Hickory Motor Speedway	Hickory, North Carolina	Brayton Haws	William Byron
May 30	Southern National Motorsports Park	Kenly, North Carolina	Deac McCaskill	Christopher Bel
June 12	Tri-County Motor Speedway	Hudson, North Carolina	Brayton Haws	Quin Houff
July 11	Motor Mile Speedway	Radford, Virginia	Josh Berry	Zane Smith
August 1	Orange County Speedway	Rougemont, North Carolina	Josh Berry	Brandon Setzer
August 29	Concord Speedway	Concord, North Carolina	Bradley McCaskill	Steve Wallace
September 19	Myrtle Beach Speedway	Myrtle Beach, South Carolina	Sam Yarbrough	Brandon Setzer
October 31	Hickory Motor Speedway	Hickory, North Carolina	Josh Berry	Christopher Bell

== Standings ==
=== Late Model Stock Car championship ===
(key) Bold – Pole position awarded by time. Italics – Pole position set by final practice results or rainout. * – Most laps led.

Pos	Driver	SNM	ROU	HCY	SNM	TCM	MMS	ROU	CON	MYB	HCY	Points
1	Brayton Haws	6	1*	1*	11	1*	15	6	6	8	**5**	294
2	Deac McCaskill	**2***	**10**	13	**1****	6	**20***	2	7	**2***	7	289
3	Myatt Snider	3	3	7	7	4	3	10	**2***	7	10	288
4	Tommy Lemons Jr.	4	6	16	9	7	19	5	3	4	2	265
5	Tyler Ankrum	5	28	**5**	2	18	9	3	17	5	3	246
6	Jamey Caudill	19	5	19	4	3	4	4	10		21	220
7	Austin McDaniel	22	26	2	8	8	8	7	21	12	11	216
8	Justin Crider	20	2	3	16	12	12	17	20	18	17	203
9	Blake Stallings	9	12	9	14	26	6	14	8	15		193
10	Thomas Beane	13	8	25	19	11	18	9	9	19	16	193
11	Michael Fose	10	25	12	22	21	11	11	22	13	8	185
12	Chris Hudspeth	16	17	14	10	27	17	22	12	17	12	176
13	Todd Gilliland	1	27	27	3	19	2	19		6		171
14	R. D. Smith III	7	4	4	17	2	21	16				167
15	Jeffrey Oakley	21	9	20	6	15	23	21	11	24		156
16	Robert Tyler	26	18	21	13	10		24	23	11	20	140
17	Roddey Sterling	DNQ	13	29	20	20	10	25	19	25	15	132
18	Josh Berry						1	**1***		9	1	128
19	Bradley McCaskill	15						15	1	3	9	124
20	Craig Stallard	DNQ	DNQ	23	15	13	16	23	24	16	24	122
21	Clint King	17	11	8	12	9						108
22	Chris Davis		14	DNS	21	23		13	25	27	18	99
23	Mike Darne	14	22	24	5	25			13			95
24	Trent Barnes	11	21	10			13					77
25	Clay Rogers						22		4		4*	71
26	Stefan Parsons	DNQ	24	18		22	14	18				70
27	Doug Barnes Jr.	30	15	15			5					67
28	Shane Lee			6		24					6	63
29	Christian PaHud		20	30		17			14	22		62
30	Garrett Campbell	24	19	26		5						58
31	Spencer Davis									14	13	39
32	Justin Hobgood								5		22	39
33	Christian Eckes	18								10		38
34	Ronald Hill							12			19	35
35	Sam Yarbrough									1		34
36	Rusty Skewes						24	8				34
37	Donnie Puryear Jr.	DNQ	16		18							33
38	Justin Johnson	27	7									32
39	Stacy Puryear	29	23	17								30
40	Payton Ryan	28		28		16						27
41	Caleb Holman						7					26
42	Stacy Compton	8										25
43	Matt Waltz	12	29									25
44	Jake Crum							20			23	23
45	Kyle Plott			11								22
46	Chad McCumbee					14						19
47	David Polenz										14	19
48	Terry Brooks Jr.								15			18
49	Bryan Dauzat								16			17
50	Shaun Mangum								18			15
51	Kate Dallenbach									20		13
52	Ryan Hall									21		12
53	Dylon Wilson			22								11
54	Tyler Dippel	23										10
55	Matt Cox									23		10
56	Ryan Wilson	25	DNQ									9
57	Tyler Church										25	8
58	Haley Moody									26		7
59	Christopher Bell										26	7
60	Bryant Barnhill	DNQ								28		6
61	Wesley Hawkins	DNQ										1
62	Eric Gerchak			DNS								1
Pos	Driver	SNM	ROU	HCY	SNM	TCM	MMS	ROU	CON	MYB	HCY	Points

=== Super Late Model championship ===
(key) Bold – Pole position awarded by time. Italics – Pole position set by final practice results or rainout. * – Most laps led.

Pos	Driver	SNM	ROU	HCY	SNM	TCM	MMS	ROU	CON	MYB	HCY	Points
1	Cole Timm	**1**	**4**	4	**2**	5	10	3	2	8	7	304
2	Kyle Grissom	3	3	3	10	2*	8	5	6	2*	2	300
3	Zane Smith	28	9	8	7	7	1	7	8	6	5	256
4	Quin Houff	10	13	24	5	1	15	4	5	5	9	251
5	Clay Jones	9	19	22	4	8	4	13	17	10	14	220
6	Steve Wallace	11	26	12	11	4	23	15	**1****	3	21	219
7	Lucas Jones	29	21	20	17	13	6	10	11	14	10	189
8	Brandon Setzer	27	6	11	14	20	27	**1***		**1**	**20**	184
9	Joey Mucciacciaro				19	10	5	11	7	11	18	157
10	Stephen Nasse	7	17	15	13	12	20	2				153
11	Lucas Ransone	12	12	31	23	17	3	19		19	22	148
12	Christopher Bell	2*	1*		1*						1*	139
13	Chris Davidson	13	5	13	15	9	12	DNS				139
14	Clay Rogers	24	25	21			14		9	4	13	129
15	Stephen Leicht	16	11	**27**	18	21	7	17				123
16	Harrison Burton	25	18		3		17	16	4			116
17	Matt Craig	21	29		26	15	11		16	12	27	115
18	Tyler Church	DNQ		9	9	6	25			16	29	112
19	Dominique Van Wieringen		22	10				8	3		17	106
20	Kaz Grala	15		16				6		7	19	102
21	Trevor Noles	8	7				**16**	20		15		101
22	William Byron			1*			2				4	97
23	Garrett Campbell				16		26	9	14	9		91
24	Gus Dean	20	24	26	27		9	DNS		13		87
25	Preston Peltier			5					10		8	76
26	Richard Gould		15			18	13	12				74
27	Brandon Lynn	18	8	18	22							66
28	Roger Lee Newton		14			19		14	20			65
29	Grant Galloway	14	20	17	20							61
30	Bubba Pollard	4	2									60
31	Vinnie Miller					14			12	18	DNQ	55
32	Anderson Bowen	5		7								54
33	Garrett Jones				8				15			43
34	Christian Eckes							18			6	42
35	Chris Fontaine	19	10	28								42
36	Jake Crum					3					23	40
37	A. J. Frank			14						20	25	40
38	David Garbo Jr.	6		23								37
39	Spencer Wauters					11	21					34
40	Kiel Spaulding	22	23		21							33
41	Chase Elliott			2								31
42	Josh Berry										3	30
43	Nick Robinson	17	28		25							29
44	Daniel Hemric			6								27
45	Ross Kenseth				6							27
46	Dave Mader III				24	16						26
47	Riley Herbst										11	22
48	Jody Measamer				12							21
49	Jeff Batten										12	21
50	Joey Padgett								13			20
51	Dale Shaw										15	18
52	Tyler Ankrum										16	17
53	John Hunter Nemechek		16									17
54	R. S. Senter									17		16
55	Todd Gilliland						18					15
56	Kodie Conner								18			15
57	Robby Lyons	26	30	29								14
58	Casey Roderick			19								14
59	Chad Finley						19					14
60	Robbie Faggart								19			14
61	Joey Coulter						22					11
62	Nick Leitz	23										10
63	Matthew Wragg		27	30								9
64	Justin Haley						24					9
65	Spencer Davis										24	9
66	D. J. Vanderley			25								8
67	Bradley McCaskill										26	7
68	Mason Diaz										28	5
69	Brandon Johnson	DNQ										1
Pos	Driver	SNM	ROU	HCY	SNM	TCM	MMS	ROU	CON	MYB	HCY	Points

== See also ==
- 2015 NASCAR Sprint Cup Series
- 2015 NASCAR Xfinity Series
- 2015 NASCAR Camping World Truck Series
- 2015 NASCAR K&N Pro Series East
- 2015 NASCAR K&N Pro Series West
- 2015 NASCAR Whelen Modified Tour
- 2015 NASCAR Whelen Southern Modified Tour
- 2015 NASCAR Canadian Tire Series
- 2015 NASCAR Mexico Series
- 2015 NASCAR Whelen Euro Series
