= Michael Fose =

American racing driver

- Born: 1995 or 1996 (age 30–31) Jacksonville, North Carolina, U.S.

CARS Late Model Stock Tour career
- Debut season: 2016
- Years active: 2015–2016, 2024–present
- Starts: 14
- Championships: 0
- Wins: 0
- Poles: 0
- Best finish: 11th in 2015
- Statistics up to date as of October 16, 2025.

Michael Fose (born 1994 or 1995) is an American professional stock car racing driver. He last competed in the zMAX CARS Tour, driving the No. 54 for R&S Race Cars.

Fose has also competed in the Southeast Limited Late Model Series, the I-95 Showdown Series, the Allison Legacy Race Series, and the NASCAR Weekly Series,

== Motorsports results ==
=== CARS Late Model Stock Car Tour ===
(key) (Bold – Pole position awarded by qualifying time. Italics – Pole position earned by points standings or practice time. * – Most laps led. ** – All laps led.)

CARS Late Model Stock Car Tour results
Year	Team	No.	Make	1	2	3	4	5	6	7	8	9	10	11	12	13	14	15	16	17	CLMSCTC	Pts	Ref
2015	Michael Fose	54	Chevy	SNM; 10	ROU; 25	HCY; 12	SNM; 22	TCM; 21	MMS; 11	ROU; 11	CON; 22	MYB; 13	HCY; 8								11th	185	
2016	Michael Fose	54	Chevy	SNM; 20	ROU	HCY	TCM	GRE	ROU	CON	MYB	HCY	SNM								57th	13	
2024	R&S Race Cars	54	Chevy	SNM	HCY	AAS	OCS	ACE	TCM	LGY	DOM	CRW	HCY; 18	NWS	ACE	WCS	FLC; 23	SBO	TCM	NWS	N/A	0	
2025	R&S Race Cars	54	N/A	AAS; DNQ	WCS	CDL; 13	OCS	ACE	NWS	LGY	DOM	CRW	HCY	AND	FLC	SBO	TCM	NWS			58th	33	

=== IHRA Late Model Sportsman Series ===
(key) (Bold – Pole position awarded by qualifying time. Italics – Pole position earned by points standings or practice time. * – Most laps led. ** – All laps led.)

IHRA Late Model Sportsman Series
Year	Team	No.	Make	1	2	3	ISCSS	Pts	Ref
2026	Fose Properties	54	Chevy	DUB	CDL; 20	AND; Wth	N/A	0	
