= Tommy Lemons Jr. =

American racing driver

- Born: February 17, 1987 (age 39) Troy, North Carolina, U.S.

CARS Late Model Stock Tour career
- Debut season: 2015
- Years active: 2015–2020
- Starts: 39
- Championships: 0
- Wins: 2
- Poles: 1
- Best finish: 2nd in 2016
- Statistics up to date as of November 24, 2025.

Tommy Lemons Jr. (born February 17, 1987) is an American former professional stock car racing driver who previously competed in the CARS Tour from 2015 to 2020, where he earned two wins and one pole position, all coming in 2016.

Lemons has also competed in the Virginia Late Model Triple Crown Series, the UARA STARS Late Model Series, the Dirty Dozen Series, and the NASCAR Weekly Series, and is a former winner of the ValleyStar Credit Union 300 at Martinsville Speedway, having won the event in 2013 and 2015.

== Motorsports results ==
=== CARS Late Model Stock Car Tour ===
(key) (Bold – Pole position awarded by qualifying time. Italics – Pole position earned by points standings or practice time. * – Most laps led. ** – All laps led.)

CARS Late Model Stock Car Tour results
Year	Team	No.	Make	1	2	3	4	5	6	7	8	9	10	11	12	13	CLMSCTC	Pts	Ref
2015	Jumpstart Motorsports	27	Ford	SNM; 4	ROU; 6	HCY; 16	SNM; 9	TCM; 7	MMS; 19	ROU; 5	CON; 3	MYB; 4	HCY; 2				4th	265	
2016	Jumpstart Motorsports	27	Ford	SNM; 2	ROU; 5	HCY; 3	TCM; 3	GRE; 1	ROU; 1	CON; 8	MYB; 2	**HCY**; 3	SNM; 5				2nd	304	
2017	Jumpstart Motorsports	27	Ford	CON	DOM	DOM	HCY	HCY	BRI; 20	AND				HCY; 18	CON; 4	SBO	18th	116	
2017	Jumpstart Motorsports	42	Ford								ROU; 16	TCM; 9	ROU; 15				18th	116	
2018	Jumpstart Motorsports	27	Ford	TCM; 12	MYB	ROU	HCY; 3	BRI	ACE; 13	CCS; 4	KPT; 8			ROU; 4	SBO		15th	163	
2018	Jumpstart Motorsports	54	Ford									HCY; 24	WKS				15th	163	
2019	Jumpstart Motorsports	27	Ford	SNM; 11													20th	109	
2019	Jumpstart Motorsports	27	Chevy		HCY; 2	ROU; 19	ACE; 22	MMS; 5	LGY; 26	DOM	CCS	HCY	ROU	SBO			20th	109	
2020	Jumpstart Motorsports	27	Ford	SNM; 23	ACE	HCY	HCY	DOM	FCS	LGY	CCS	FLO	GRE				55th	10	
