= David Garbo Jr. =

American racing driver

- Born: September 30, 1996 (age 30); Stonington, Connecticut, U.S.

ARCA Menards Series East career
- 21 races run over 2 years
- Best finish: 12th (2015)
- First race: 2014 New Smyrna 150 Presented by JEGS (New Smyrna)
- Last race: 2015 Drive Sober 125 (Dover)
Wins	Top tens	Poles
0	3	0
- Statistics up to date as of November 22, 2024.

David Garbocauskas Jr. (born September 30, 1996) is an American former professional stock car racing driver who has competed in the NASCAR K&N Pro Series East from 2014 to 2015.

Garbo has also competed in series such as the ASA CRA Super Series, the CARS Super Late Model Tour, the X-1R Pro Cup Series, and the UARA STARS Late Model Series.

== Motorsports results ==
=== NASCAR ===
(key) (Bold - Pole position awarded by qualifying time. Italics - Pole position earned by points standings or practice time. * – Most laps led.)

==== K&N Pro Series East ====
NASCAR K&N Pro Series East results
Year	Team	No.	Make	1	2	3	4	5	6	7	8	9	10	11	12	13	14	15	16	NKNPSEC	Pts	Ref
2014	Hattori Racing Enterprises	1	Toyota	NSM; 16	DAY; 21	BRI; 7	GRE; 20	RCH; 16	IOW; 18	BGS	FIF	LGY	NHA; 16	COL	IOW	GLN	VIR	GRE	DOV	23rd	194	
2015	Marsh Racing	31	Chevy	NSM; 12	GRE; 13	BRI; 12		BGS; 19	LGY; 19	COL; 19	NHA; 20		GLN; 23	MOT; 21	VIR; 3	RCH; 21	DOV; 26			12th	387	
2015	Marsh Racing	36	Chevy				IOW; 9					IOW; 12								12th	387	

=== CARS Super Late Model Tour ===
(key)

CARS Super Late Model Tour results
Year	Team	No.	Make	1	2	3	4	5	6	7	8	9	10	CSLMTC	Pts	Ref
2015	Jamie Yelton	8	Ford	SNM; 6	ROU									38th	37	
2015	Jamie Yelton	31G	Ford			HCY; 23	SNM	TCM	MMS	ROU	CON	MYB	HCY	38th	37	
