= Brayton Haws =

American racing driver

- Born: July 12, 1999 (age 27) Youngsville, North Carolina, U.S.

CARS Late Model Stock Tour career
- Debut season: 2015
- Years active: 2015
- Starts: 10
- Championships: 1
- Wins: 3
- Poles: 1
- Best finish: 1st in 2015
- Statistics up to date as of October 7, 2025.

Brayton Haws (born July 12, 1999) is an American former professional stock car racing driver.

Haws is a former champion of the CARS Late Model Stock Tour, having won the championship in the series' inaugural season in 2015. During that year, he won three races at Orange County Speedway, Hickory Motor Speedway, and Tri-County Motor Speedway.

Haws has also competed in the Virginia Late Model Triple Crown Series, the Paramount Kia Big 10 Challenge, the Dirt Cup Challenge Series, and the NASCAR Weekly Series.

== Motorsports results ==
=== CARS Late Model Stock Car Tour ===
(key) (Bold – Pole position awarded by qualifying time. Italics – Pole position earned by points standings or practice time. * – Most laps led. ** – All laps led.)

CARS Late Model Stock Car Tour results
Year	Team	No.	Make	1	2	3	4	5	6	7	8	9	10	CLMSCTC	Pts	Ref
2015	Hawk McCall Racing	41	Ford	SNM; 6	ROU; 1*	HCY; 1*	SNM; 11	TCM; 1*	MMS; 15	ROU; 6	CON; 6	MYB; 8	**HCY**; 5	1st	294	
