= Concord Speedway =

Former NASCAR track in North Carolina, US

Coordinates: 35°18′31″N 80°31′17″W

World's Fastest Half-Mile Tri-Oval The Track Where Grassroots Racing Lives
- Location: Midland, North Carolina
- Capacity: 8,500
- Opened: 1982
- Closed: 2019
- Former names: Concord Motor Speedway (1982– 1992); Concord Motorsport Park (1993–2008)
- Major events: PASS South Super Late Models; NASCAR Whelen Southern Modified Tour; CARS Super Late Model Tour; CARS Late Model Stock Car Tour

Half-mile oval
- Surface: Asphalt
- Length: 0.500 mi (0.804 km)
- Turns: 3
- Banking: 8° (front straight); 14° (turn 1); 10° (dogleg); 11° (back straight); 14° (turn 3)

Quarter-mile oval
- Surface: Asphalt
- Length: 0.402 km (0.250 mi)
- Turns: 4
- Banking: 5° (straightaways); 8° (turns)

Concord Speedway was a motorsports facility located in the town of Midland, North Carolina, southeast of Concord, North Carolina. The complex featured a 1/2-mile asphalt tri-oval and a 1/4-mile asphalt oval.

The complex was built in 1982 by Henry Furr, originally with the big track as a dirt 4/10-mile oval. The track was later paved, and then reconfigured in 1991 as a 1/2-mile tri-oval. The primary divisions for the half-mile shifted between Super Late Models, and Late Model Stock Cars.

The small track was built first as a 1/5-mile layout for go-kart racing in the mid to late 1980s, the track was reconfigured to add a 1/4-mile asphalt oval layout in the mid '90s – the bigger layout featured was loosely egg shaped around the 1/5-mile oval – this layout traditionally hosted INEX Legends & INEX Bandoleros as the primary weekly division.

The half-mile track was especially known for the Big 10 Series for Super Late Models, and the North-South Shootout event (featuring multiple divisions – the marquee being a 125-lap Tour-type Modified race).

The track closed in July 2019, and was sold to Copart.

== History ==
=== Precursor ===
In total, there were three tracks under the Concord Speedway name, this facility being the third.

The first track to use the Concord Speedway moniker was built in the 1950s and was built off of Poplar Tent Rd. – located at the end of Old Speedway Dr. NW, this track held seven NASCAR Grand National (now known as the NASCAR Cup Series) events between 1956 and 1959. The track was left abandoned after the closure.

The second track was also built off of Poplar Tent Rd. (located near Eva Drive & Channing Circle) – also in the 1950s. This track was a 1/2-mile dirt oval, and also was named Harris Speedway, Concord International Speedway & New Concord Speedway throughout its history. NASCAR held five Grand National races between 1962 and 1964. This track ran throughout the 1970s, it hosted the debut season of the National Dirt Racing Association – which was won by Rodney Combs on May 26, 1979. The NDRA race was also the final race at the Eva Dr. facility.

Both properties of the first two tracks are now housing developments.

However, it wasn't the first track to be built in Concord or Cabarrus County. The first track in Concord was called the Concord Fairgrounds, and was located off of Highway 29 at the former Cabarrus District Fairgrounds. This half mile dirt oval facility was originally built for horse racing, and was first used for auto racing in 1925. The track ran until 1934 & also hosted 2 AAA Contest Board Sprint Car races (1931 & 1934). Other notable tracks in the county include famed Charlotte Motor Speedway complex, the Midland Dustbowl - which held racing from 1948 to the 1950s, Twin City Speedway (in Kannapolis) - which held stock car racing on a 1/4 mile dirt oval up to 1964 and Two Flags Speedway (off of Gold Hill Rd.) - which hosted Micro Sprints & Go-Kart racing from 1976 to 1997.

==== Results ====
Fairgrounds (1924–1932)

AAA Sprint Cars

- 1932 - Johnny Sawyer
- 1934 - Floyd Davis

Poplar Tent Road location (1949–1959)

NASCAR Grand National – NASCAR held 7 Grand National races on the original dirt half mile located on Old Speedway Drive (near Poplar Tent Road) in Concord.

- 1956 - Speedy Thompson
- 1957 (race 2) - Marvin Panch
- 1957 (race 5) - Jack Smith
- 1957 (race 51) - Fireball Roberts
- 1958 - Lee Petty
- 1959 (race 5) - Curtis Turner
- 1959 (race 44) - Jack Smith

NASCAR Convertible Series – NASCAR held one Convertible Division race on the original dirt half mile.

- 1957 - Curtis Turner

Eva Drive location (1949–1979)

NASCAR Grand National – NASCAR held 5 Grand National races on the second dirt half mile track located off of Eva Drive (near Popular Tent Road) in Concord. The main entrance driveway for the track is now called Speedway Drive, and is a part of a housing complex.

- 1962 (race 1) - Jack Smith
- 1962 (race 6) - Joe Weatherly
- 1962 (race 20) - Joe Weatherly
- 1964 (race 1) - Ned Jarrett
- 1964 (race 29) - Richard Petty

USAC Stock Car – United States Auto Club held two stock car races at the second facility in 1961 and 1963. Both races were 200 lap affairs.

- 1961 - Don White
- 1963 - Bill Cheesbourg

National Dirt Racing Association - NDRA held a single race on the second dirt 1/2 mile track in 1979.

- 1979 (May 26) - Rodney Combs

=== A new beginning ===
The current track was built by race promoter Henry Furr in 1982, Furr was looking to build a track following the sale of the previous 1/2 mile dirt track that he promoted. The track was originally a four-tenths of a mile oval, it hosted 3 races for the NDRA dirt late model touring series in 1983 - including the season finale, those were won by Larry Moore (July 4), dirt modified ace Kenny Brightbill (September 3) & Mike Duvall (October 8th). The first few years, the track featured no walls on the outside corners, those were added in by 1984 or 1985.

=== Pavement era ===
Furr paved the track in August 1986, the track was reconfigured in 1991, adding a true dog-leg to the backstretch. The track now is a half-mile with three unique turns, all with unique banking. The shape of the new layout was similar to Pocono Raceway, and Sanair Super Speedway. Pit road entrance is located in the tri-oval prior to turn three, grandstand seating held over 12,000 fans.

The track started the Big 10 Series for Super Late Models in 1987, Jack Sprague won the first series title. The series became very popular with the fans, as it was highly competitive.

David Laton purchased the track following the 1996 season. The Big 10 Series didn't return in 1997 for the first season under new ownership & Late Model Stock Cars became the main weekly championship of the half-mile. Laton made several capital improvements to the facility including a repave (done in 1999), replaced barriers & fencing, a Hubbell lighting system & several fan amenities. Grandstand seating was also downsized, as most of the Alan Kulwicki Grandstand became a dirt berm, with only the portion near the turn 1 gate staying intact - being replaced with metal bleachers.

The track brought back the Super Late Models for the Big 10 Series in 2003, the championship lasted until 2005. Freddie Query is the track's all-time leader in wins and claimed the Big 10 series championship in 2004 and 2005.

Late Model Stock Cars returned as the main track championship, until 2009 when the track added Pro Late Models to the weekly card.

One of the track's more popular events, the North South Shootout was started in 2003 at the half-mile tri-oval. The event featured a 125-lap race for Tour-type Modifieds, along with several other marquee divisions such as Supermodifieds & the ARCA/CRA Super Series. The event stayed at Concord until 2010, it was originally going to move to Myrtle Beach Speedway for 2011 - however Caraway Speedway hosted the annual event following the death of original race promoter Charles Kepley.

=== Half Mile uncertainty & revival ===
The track stopped weekly racing on the half-mile tri-oval in 2012, only the quarter-mile oval has hosted weekly racing since. The quarter-mile weekly program features INEX Legends, INEX Bandoleros, along with Davis Mini Cups, go-karts, and quarter midgets on select nights. The quarter-mile traditionally featured racing from March to May, and August to early October – with a 2-month break in June and July. Previously, this layout also featured USAC Speed2 Eastern Midgets during the summer months (2008–2010).

In 2015, racing returned to the half-mile tri-oval after not hosting any touring series for the past 2 years, the opening event featured the PASS South Super Late Models and Koma Unwind Modified Madness Series running on Memorial Day weekend, announced by Alan Dietz.

That season also saw the return of the North-South Shootout event in November. Alongside the John Blewett III Memorial 125 for the Tour-type Modifieds, other touring series such as the PASS South Super Late Models were a part of the event. CARS Tour also returned that year – now in the dual series format for Super Late Models & Late Model Stock Cars. CARS Tour ran for 3 seasons until the end of 2017.

On May 5, 2018, the track hosted the Minimizer Bandit Big Rig Series. Defending series champion Ricky Rude got the lead on lap #6 & won the A-main feature.

=== Closure ===
On January 9, 2019, North-South Shootout promoter Darren Hacket announced that the event would move away from the facility to Hickory Motor Speedway due to the uncertain future of the Concord Speedway complex.

The track would continue to host the INEX Legend Cars & INEX Bandoleros on the quarter-mile track.

On July 2, 2019, it was announced that the track would be sold, and that leaders in each of the weekly series point standings would be awarded championship trophies for the year. The buyer was later reported to be Copart.

== Notable competitors ==
Winners and competitors at the track include Greg Pope, Freddy Query, Dale Earnhardt Jr., Jack Sprague, Ernie Irvan, Bobby Labonte, Denny Bennet, Justin Labonte, Clay Rogers, Jimmy Simpson, Bobby Gill, Dale Earnhardt, Bobby Measmer Jr., Ryan Preece, Daniel Hemric, Buster Bennet, Jeff Melton, Sonny Schoffen, Kenny Brooks, Shane Huffman and Josh Hogan

== Statistics ==
The park consists of two tracks: a 1/2-mile tri-oval and a 1/4-mile oval. Originally the 1/4-mile oval was a 1/5-mile oval and the 1/4-mile was added later. The 1/5-mile is still there but only used for Davis Mini Cups and quarter midgets. The tri-oval seats 8,500 fans with room for 28 RVs, while the 1/4 mile track seats 2,050. Additionally, the track has several air-conditioned suites located behind the main grandstand.

The track is active as a site for the filming of several television commercials, television shows, movies, and music videos.

== Events ==
=== Former touring series & events (half-mile) ===
- ALL PRO Super Series (1987)
- Allison Legacy Race Series (1997, 2004, 2006–2008, 2010–11, 2017–18)
- ARCA/CRA Super Series - Southern Division (2010)
- ASA National Tour (2001, 2003)
- ASA Late Model Series - Southern Division (2008–09)
- Hooters Pro Cup Series 1998-2008
  - CARS Late Model Stock Tour (2015-–2017)
  - CARS Super Late Model Tour (2015–2017)
- CARS Pro Cup Series (1998–2000, 2002–2011)
- ISMA Supermodifieds (1993)
- ISCARS Dash Touring Series (2010)
- KOMA Unwind Modified Madness Series (2015)
- Lucas Oil Pro Pulling League
- Mid-Atlantic Limited Late Model Series (2016)
- Mid-Atlantic Street Stock Championship (2015–2016, 2018)
- Minimizer Bandit Big Rig Series (2018)
- NASCAR
  - NASCAR Goodys Dash Series (1989–1990, 1997–1998)
  - NASCAR AutoZone Elite Division, Southeast Series (1997–1998)
  - NASCAR Whelen Southern Modified Tour (2009, 2016)
- NDRA Stroh's Pro National Series (1983)
- Pro All Stars Series
  - PASS South Super Late Model Series (2007, 2012, 2015–2017)
  - PASS Pro Late Model Series (2015)
  - PASS Super Limited Late Models (2012)
- PRA Tours
  - 602 Modified Tour (2017)
  - 602 Super Limiteds Tour (2017 & 2018)
  - Southern Modified Racing Series (2016–2018)
- Rolling Thunder Modifieds (2007, 2010)
- SMART Modified Tour (1991, 1998–1999, 2002–2004)
- Southern All Star Asphalt Series (1998)
- Southern Outlaw Street Stock Tour (2016)
- UARA STARS Late Model Series (2007–2012)
- USAC Racing
  - USAC AMSOIL National Sprint Car Championship (2006)
  - USAC NOS Energy National Midgets (2006)
  - USAC Speed2 Eastern Midgets (2006)
- USCS Outlaw Thunder Tour (2001–2002, 2005)
- Virginia Mini Cups (2002–2005)
- BIG 10 Super Late Model Series (1987–1996, 2003–2005)
- North South Shootout (2003–2010, 2015–2018)
  - Tour-type Modifieds - John Blewett III Memorial 125 in memory of Charles Kepley (2003–2010, 2015–2018)
  - PRA 602 Super Limited Tour (2018)
  - PRA 602 Modified Tour (2018)
  - Street Stocks (2008, 2015–2016, 2018)
  - Mini Stocks (2015–2018)
  - PASS South Super Late Models (2015–2017)
  - SK Modifieds (2005–2010, 2015–2017)
  - Limited Late Models (2015–2017)
  - Chargers (2017)
  - Mid-Atlantic Limited Late Model Series (2016)
  - Southeastern Super Trucks (2015)
  - Vintage Modifieds / Sportsman / Flatheads (2003–2010, 2015–2016)
  - CRA Super Series - Southern Division (2010)
  - USA Modifieds (2010)
  - TBARA Sprint Cars (2009)
  - Supermodifieds (2007–2008)
  - SK Light / Crate Modifieds (2006–2007)
  - Four Cylinders (2006–2007)
  - Pro 4 Modifieds (2006)
  - Late Model Stock Cars (2004)
  - INEX Thunder Roadsters (2004–2005)
  - Pro Trucks (2003)

=== Former touring series & special events (quarter-mile) ===
- USAC Racing
  - USAC Speed2 Eastern Midgets (2008–2012)
  - USAC Speed2 Eastern Midgets - Young Guns (2010 & 2011)
- Carolina Asphalt Racing Kart Series (-2006)
- North South Shootout (2006)
  - USAC Speed2 Eastern Midgets
  - Mini Stocks
  - INEX Legends

=== Former weekly divisions (half-mile) ===
- Late Model Stock Cars (−2012)
- Street Stock (2012)
- Fast & Furious 4's (2007–2012)
- Vintage Sportsman (2012)
- Sportsman (2012)
- Pure Stock (2003–2011)
- Pro Late Model (2009 & 2010)
- Thunderstox (2010)
- INEX Thunder Roadsters (2009)
- Limited Late Models (2004–2008)
- Super Late Models (1987–1996, 2003–2005)
- Mini Stocks (–2005)
- Hornets (–2005)
- Limited Stock Cars (–2003)
- Pro Trucks (–2003)
- X-Cars (2001–2002)
- Road Hawgs
- Super Stocks

=== Former weekly divisions (quarter mile) ===
- INEX WIX Filters Legends Cars (–2019) – (Young Lions/Semi-Pro/Pro/Masters)
- INEX Bandoleros (–2019) – (Beginners Bandits/Bandits/Outlaws)
- Davis Mini Cups
- Go-karts
- Quarter midgets

Note: data only goes back to 2001

== Results ==
=== North South Shootout ===
the North South Shootout was held 12 times at Concord, with the marquee race being the Tour-type Modified - John Blewett III Memorial 125 in memory of Charles Kepley. Other divisions of the event included: ARCA/CRA Super Series, PASS South Super Late Models, Supermodifieds, SK Modifieds, Vintage cars & other regional divisions from the east coast.

==== Tour-type Modifieds ====
Season	Date	Winning driver	Laps
100 lap event
2003	November 8	John Blewett, III	100
2004	November 6	Donny Lia	128
2005	November 5	John Blewett, III	100
2006	November 4	Matt Hirschman	100
2007	November 2	Matt Hirschman	100
125 lap event
2008	November 8	Burt Myers	125
2009	November 7	Burt Myers	125
2010	November 6	Matt Hirschman	125
2015	November 8	Justin Bonsignore	125
2016	November 5	Andy Seuss	125
2017	November 4	Matt Hirschman	125
2018	November 10	Jon McKennedy	125

==== Super Late Models ====
Season	Date	Winning driver	Laps
CRA Super Series - Southern Division
2010	November 6	Colt James	125
PASS South Super Late Models
2015	November 8	Dave Garbo Jr.	100
2016	November 5	Dalton Sargeant	125
2017	November 4	Matt Craig	125

=== ASA National Tour ===
ASA held two ASA National Tour races on the paved half mile.

- 2001 - Johnny Sauter
- 2003 - Davin Scites

=== CARS Tour ===
CARS Tour held races on the paved half mile with the CARS Pro Cup Series (then USAR Pro Cup) between 1998 & 2011, and the current dual series format for Super Late Models & Late Model Stock Cars between 2015 & 2017.

Season	Date	Winning driver	Manufacturer	Laps
USAR Hooters Pro Cup
1998	May 23	Chad Chaffin	Ford	250
1998	July 24	Michael Ritch	Chevrolet	250
1999	May 29	Mario Gosselin	Chevrolet	250
2000	October 28	Clay Rogers	Ford	250
USAR Hooters Pro Cup Series - Championship Series
2001	October 27	Hal Goodson	Ford	250
USAR Hooters Pro Cup Series - Southern Division
2002	September 14	Bobby Gill	Ford	222
2003	May 10	Clay Rogers	Ford	251
2004	April 24	Bobby Gill	Ford	250
2005	April 23	Bobby Gill	Ford	250
2006	April 29	Shane Huffman	Chevrolet	250
2007	April 28	Chase Pistone	Chevrolet	254
2008	April 26	Michael Ritch	Ford	205
USAR Pro Cup Series
2009	April 4	Trevor Bayne	Chevrolet	250
2009	September 5	Clay Rogers	Chevrolet	254
2010	August 28	Jeff Agnew	Ford	250
2011	August 13	Brad Rogers	Ford	200

Season	Date	Winning driver	Manufacturer	Laps
CARS Late Model Stock Tour
2015	August 29	Bradley McCaskill	Toyota	100
2016	August 27	Josh Berry	Chevrolet	100
2017	March 11	Josh Berry	Chevrolet	100
2017	August 26	Josh Berry	Chevrolet	125

Season	Date	Winning driver	Manufacturer	Laps
CARS Super Late Model Tour
2015	August 29	Steve Wallace	Ford	100
2016	August 27	Raphaël Lessard	Toyota	100
2017	March 11	Harrison Burton	Toyota	100
2017	August 26	Cole Rouse	Toyota	125

=== NASCAR Whelen Southern Modified Tour ===
NASCAR held two Whelen Southern Modified Tour races on the paved half mile, and the SMART Modified Tour (precursor to the Whelen Southern Modified Tour) also held 6 races at the track.

Season	Date	Winning driver	Laps
SMART Modified Tour (1988–2004)
1991	April 13	Gary Myers	
1998	July 2	Jay Hedgecock	
1999	July 1	Jay Hedgecock	
2002	October 5	Junior Miller	
2003	October 4	Jay Hedgecock	150
2004	October 9	Ted Christopher	154
NASCAR Whelen Southern Modified Tour (2005–2016)
2008	March 21	Ted Christopher	150
2016	April 2	George Brunnhoelzl III	150

=== PASS South Super Late Models ===
PASS held 10 races at Concord between 2007 & 2017.

Season	Date	Event	Winning driver	Laps
2007	November 17	Mason Dixon Meltdown	Ben Rowe	200
2010	May 29	Old Glory 150	Andy Loden	150
2011	November 26	Mason Dixon Meltdown	Colt James	200
2012	May 26	CV Products 125	Kyle Grissom	125
2012	November 24	Mason Dixon Meltdown	Preston Peltier	200
2015	November 8	North South Shootout	Dave Garbo Jr.	100
2016	May 27	Old Glory Twin 125's	Ryan Moore	125
2016	November 5	Mason Dixon Meltdown	Dalton Sargeant	125
2017	November 4	North South Shootout	Matt Craig	125
2018	May 25	Old Glory 125	Matt Wallace	125

=== UARA STARS ===
UARA STARS Late Model Series held 9 races at the half-mile track from 2007 to 2012.

Season	Date	Winning driver	Laps
2007	March 31	Matt DiBenedetto	152
2007	October 20	Ross Furr	150
2008	March 29	Ross Furr	150
2008	October 25	Chad Mullis	150
2009	April 25	Paddy Rodenbeck	150
2009	November 14	Coleman Pressley	150
2010	August 7	Garrett Campbell	150
2011	October 29	Steve Wallace	150
2012	August 4	Brandon Jones	155

== Track Champions ==
=== Half Mile Track ===
==== Big 10 Series (Super Late Models) ====
- 1987 - Jack Sprague
- 1988 - Larry Raines
- 1989 - Jack Sprague
- 1990 - Robbie Faggart
- 1991 - Rich Bickle
- 1992 - Rich Bickle
- 1993 - Freddie Query
- 1994 - Freddie Query
- 1995 - Mike Thomas
- 1996 - Eddie Massengill
- 2003 - Eddie Massengill
- 2004 - Freddie Query
- 2005 - Freddie Query

==== Pro Late Models ====
- 2009 - Cooper Faassen
- 2010 - Colt James

==== Late Model Stock Cars ====
- 1988 - Freddie Query
- 1989 - Jack Sprague
- 1990 - Freddie Query
- 1991 - Freddie Query
- 1992 - Freddie Query
- 1993 - Greg Pope
- 1994 - Jack Sprague
- 1995 - Greg Pope
- 1996 - Lance Moss
- 1997 - Mike Herman Jr.
- 1998 - Mike Herman Jr.
- 1999 - Kevin Love
- 2000 - Kevin Love
- 2001 - Kevin Love
- 2002 - Chris Beach
- 2003 - Shaun Mangum
- 2004 - Todd Bardburry
- 2005 - Travis Sharpe
- 2006 - Shane Brafford
- 2007 - Chuck Crump
- 2008 - Kevin Love
- 2009 - Steve Ackerly
- 2010 - Jay Payne
- 2011 - Bobby Measmer Jr.
- 2012 - Kenny Brooks

==== Late Model Sportsman ====
- 1997 - Terry Brooks

==== Limited Late Models ====
- 2004 - Terry Brooks Jr.
- 2005 - Terry Hoggard
- 2006 - Ben Hinson
- 2007 - Bobby Measmer Jr.
- 2008 - Mike Terry

==== Pro Truck ====
- 2000 - Jeremy Moore
- 2001 - Roger Lee Newton
- 2002 - Terry Brooks Jr.
- 2003 - Terry Brooks Jr.

==== Limited Stock ====
- 2001 - Kenneth Cook
- 2002 - Jeff Melton
- 2003 - David Kepley

==== Pure Stock ====
- 2003 - Mark Harris
- 2004 - Luke Nickels
- 2005 - Brian Love
- 2006 - Steve Irvin
- 2007 - Ben Smith
- 2008 - Charles Hutto
- 2009 - Jeff Melton
- 2010 - Jeff Melton

==== Street Stock ====
- 1997 - Dave Berry
- 1999 - Mike Glover

==== Fast & Furious Fours ====
- 2007 - Tracy Mullis
- 2008 - Chad Miller
- 2009 - Wayne Harrington
- 2010 - Chad Miller

==== Mini Stocks ====
- 1997 - David Pennell
- 1998- Randy Freeze
- 2001 - Jeff Whitley
- 2002 - Roy Maness
- 2003 - Randy Freeze
- 2004 - Adam Beaver
- 2005 - David Pennell

==== Hornets ====
- 2002 - Mark Harris
- 2003 - Mark Harris
- 2004 - Chad Miller
- 2005 - Bobby Measmer Jr.

==== Thunderstox ====
- 2010 - Rusty Drye

==== INEX Thunder Roadsters ====
- 2004 - Matt Lassiter
- 2005 - Kyle Beattie
- 2009 - Adam Welch

==== X-Carz ====
- 2001 - Guy Bacelo
- 2002 - Junior Cress

== In popular culture ==
Concord was noted for being used as a filming & production location, especially within the racing industry given the close proximity to most NASCAR teams.

Some of the notable movies & shows filmed at the facility included: 3: The Dale Earnhardt Story & Shaq Vs. (as the opening show of season 2 where Shaquille O'Neal held a match race with NASCAR star & former Concord regular Dale Earnhardt Jr.)

Many commercials were filmed at Concord as well, among the companies & brands that used the track included: Allstate, AAA Insurance, Blimpie, Coors Light, ESPN, Gilette, National Guard, Mountain Dew, Pizza Hut, TBS (promotion featuring country music duo Brooks & Dunn for the Coca-Cola 600 in 1998) & Wrangler Jeans.

Among video games, Concord was included in several video games. Most notable of those is IRacing - which was one of their first tracks that the group laser scanned in 2005. The track is currently a part of iRacing's base content package. It was also featured in the USAR Hooters Pro Cup game by Infogrames (released in 2002 for the PC).

Among modding circles for various PC racing games, it was also recreated for several Papyrus Design Group NASCAR games such as NASCAR Racing 2003 Season, and also for NASCAR Heat.

Concord was also used for some inspiration for a fictional track in several NASCAR console games by EA Sports. The fictional track - called Levi Strauss Signature Speedway debuted in NASCAR 2005: Chase for the Cup.
