= Terry Brooks (racing driver) =

American racing driver

- Nationality: American
- Born: February 27, 1963 (age 63) Concord, North Carolina, U.S.

NASCAR Goody's Dash Series career
- Debut season: 1998
- Years active: 1998–1999
- Starts: 9
- Championships: 0
- Wins: 0
- Poles: 1
- Best finish: 29th in 1999
- Statistics up to date as of January 7, 2025.

Terry Brooks (born February 27, 1963) is an American former professional stock car racing driver who competed in the NASCAR Goody's Dash Series from 1998 to 1999.

Brooks also competed in the NASCAR Southeast Series, the Southern All Star Super Late Model Series, the NASCAR Sportsman Division, and the ASA Southeast Asphalt Tour.

== Motorsports results ==
=== NASCAR ===
(key) (Bold – Pole position awarded by qualifying time. Italics – Pole position earned by points standings or practice time. * – Most laps led.)

==== Busch Series ====
NASCAR Busch Series results
Year	Team	No.	Make	1	2	3	4	5	6	7	8	9	10	11	12	13	14	15	16	17	18	19	20	21	22	23	24	25	26	NBSC	Pts	Ref
1996	Dan Browder	77	Chevy	DAY	CAR	RCH; DNQ	ATL	NSV; DNQ	DAR	BRI	HCY; DNQ	NZH	CLT	DOV	SBO	MYB	GLN	MLW	NHA	TAL	IRP	MCH	BRI	DAR	RCH	DOV	CLT	CAR	HOM	N/A	0	

==== Goody's Dash Series ====
NASCAR Goody's Dash Series results
Year	Team	No.	Make	1	2	3	4	5	6	7	8	9	10	11	12	13	14	15	16	17	18	19	20	NGDS	Pts	Ref
1998	B&W Motorsports	27	Chevy	DAY; DNQ	HCY	CAR	CLT; 10	TRI	LAN	BRI	SUM	GRE	ROU	SNM	MYB									53rd	359	
1998	B&W Motorsports	27	Pontiac													CON; DSQ	HCY	LAN	STA	LOU	VOL	USA	HOM; 13	53rd	359	
1999	B&W Motorsports	27	Pontiac	DAY; 30	**HCY**; 19	CAR; 12	CLT; 28	BRI; 8	LOU	SUM	GRE; 10	ROU	STA	MYB	HCY	LAN	USA	JAC	LAN					29th	661	
