= 1998 NASCAR Goody's Dash Series =

The 1998 NASCAR Goody's Dash Series was the 24th season of the NASCAR Goody's Dash Series. It began at Daytona International Speedway on February 12 and concluded at Homestead-Miami Speedway on November 15. Mike Swaim Jr. entered the season as the defending Drivers' Champion, Robert Huffman won his second championship, 399 points in front of David Hutto.

== Schedule ==
No.	Race title	Track	Date
1	Discount Auto Parts 200 presented by ACDelco Rapidfire	Daytona International Speedway, Daytona Beach, Florida	February 12
2	Elmer Killan Memorial 100	Hickory Motor Speedway, Hickory, North Carolina	May 2
3	Yadkin Valley Chevrolet-Geo/Brigman Clinic 125	Caraway Speedway, Asheboro, North Carolina	May 9
4	Tom Johnson Camping Center/Easy Care Vehicle Service Contracts 100	Lowe's Motor Speedway, Concord, North Carolina	May 20
5	Ekamant Coated Abrasives 125	Tri-County Motor Speedway, Hudson, North Carolina	May 29
6	Country Cupboard 150	Lanier National Speedway, Braselton, Georgia	June 13
7	Goody's Dash 150	Bristol Motor Speedway, Bristol, Tennessee	June 20
8	Post and Courier 100	Summerville Speedway, Summerville, South Carolina	July 4
9	Expression Unlimited, Inc. 100	Greenville-Pickens Speedway, Greenville, South Carolina	July 11
10	ATK Engine 125	Orange County Speedway, Rougemont, North Carolina	July 18
11	SNS Coastal Carolina Freightliner 125	Southern National Motorsports Park, Kenly, North Carolina	August 1
12	Time Warner Cable 100	Myrtle Beach Speedway, Myrtle Beach, South Carolina	August 8
13	Yadkin Valley Chevrolet 100	Concord Speedway, Concord, North Carolina	August 15
14	Galaxy Foods/White House 100	Hickory Motor Speedway, Hickory, North Carolina	August 29
15	Tamco/PPG 100	Langley Speedway, Hampton, Virginia	September 5
16	Gold Star Dodge Dealer 100	St. Augustine Speedway, St. Augustine, Florida	September 12
17	Star Drywall 125	Louisville Motor Speedway, Louisville, Kentucky	September 19
18	T.G. Lee Dairy 125	Volusia Speedway Park, Barberville, Florida	October 3
19	Discount Auto Parts/Pennzoil 150	USA International Speedway, Lakeland, Florida	October 24
20	Pennzoil 50	Homestead-Miami Speedway, Homestead, Florida	November 15

== Results and standings ==
=== Races ===
No.	Race	Pole position	Most laps led	Winning driver	Manufacturer
1	Discount Auto Parts 200	Mike Swaim Jr.	Mike Swaim Jr.	Mike Swaim Jr.	Pontiac
2	Elmer Killan Memorial 100	David Hutto	David Hutto	David Hutto	Chevrolet
3	Yadkin Valley Chevrolet-Geo/Brigman Clinic 125	Ricky Bryant	Robert Huffman	Mike Swaim Jr.	Pontiac
4	Tom Johnson Camping Center/Easy Care Vehicle Service Contracts 100	Mike Swaim Jr.	David Hutto	David Hutto	Chevrolet
5	Ekamant Coated Abrasives 125	Robert Huffman	Robert Huffman	Robert Huffman	Pontiac
6	Country Cupboard 150	Robert Huffman	Robert Huffman	Robert Huffman	Pontiac
7	Goody's Dash 150	Mike Swaim Jr.	Mike Swaim Jr.	Robert Huffman	Pontiac
8	Post and Courier 100	Robert Huffman	Robert Huffman	Robert Huffman	Pontiac
9	Expression Unlimited, Inc. 100	Jake Hobgood	Jake Hobgood	Jake Hobgood	Pontiac
10	ATK Engine 125	Ricky Bryant	David Hutto	Ricky Bryant	Pontiac
11	SNS Coastal Carolina Freightliner 125	Jake Hobgood	Robert Huffman	Robert Huffman	Pontiac
12	Time Warner Cable 100	Robert Huffman	Robert Huffman	Robert Huffman	Pontiac
13	Yadkin Valley Chevrolet 100	Robert Huffman	David Hutto	Robert Huffman	Pontiac
14	Galaxy Foods/White House 100	Jake Hobgood	Robert Huffman	David Hutto	Chevrolet
15	Tamco/PPG 100	David Hutto	Robert Huffman	David Hutto	Chevrolet
16	Gold Star Dodge Dealer 100	Jake Hobgood	David Hutto	David Hutto	Chevrolet
17	Star Drywall 125	Ricky Bryant	Robert Huffman	Robert Huffman	Pontiac
18	T.G. Lee Dairy 125	David Hutto	David Hutto	David Hutto	Chevrolet
19	Discount Auto Parts/Pennzoil 150	George Crenshaw	Robert Huffman	Mickey York	Pontiac
20	Pennzoil 50	Jake Hobgood	Mike Swaim Jr.	Mike Swaim Jr.	Pontiac

=== Drivers' championship ===
(key) Bold - Pole position awarded by time. Italics - Pole position set by final practice results or rainout. * – Most laps led.

Pos	Driver	DAY	HCY	CAR	CLT	TRI	LAN	BRI	SUM	GRE	ROU	SNM	MYB	CON	HCY	LAN	STA	LOU	VOL	USA	HOM	Points
1	Robert Huffman	2	2	10*	3	**1***	**1***	1	**1****	2	2	1*	**1****	**1**	2*	5*	3	1*	2	25*	15	3285
2	David Hutto	30	**1***	28	1*	23	2	22	2	3	3*	2	4	8*	1	**1**	1*	16	**1****	24	16	2867
3	Ricky Bryant	4	5	**3**	11	2	4	16	23	8	**1**	13	13	3	26	9	4	**2**	6	6	11	2867
4	B. J. Mackey	33	7	4	12	4	21	12	15	7	5	5	23	2	3	4	2	4	10	5	10	2800
5	Jake Hobgood	27	3	22	6	3	20	17	3	**1***	7	**11**	2	24	**4**	3	**24**	9	8	2	**3**	2787
6	Jon Redman	11	6	8	14	10	6	7	8	16	6	19	9	7	17	19	11	7	13	15	25	2594
7	Donnie Apple	19	11	14	26	8	14	9	11	11	4	9	28	18	14	11	8	6	3	22	7	2540
8	Doc Brewer	3	20	16	4	12	16	4	13	25	9	16	27	5	24	12	7	11	12	11	14	2519
9	Scott Weaver	32	22	9	27	17	15	30	26	23	10	3	3	17	21	6	5	15	5	7	8	2408
10	Eddie Kelley	25	DNQ	27	34	18	11	29	5	9	18	7	26	4	25	7	9	5	4	21	4	2356
11	Chris Hall	9	13	19	33	19	23	21	17	21	23	6	18	11	10	8	13	10	7	23	18	2310
12	Jimmy Gross	38	26	17	15	7	5	10	9	18	16	10	7	21	23	14	21	17	19	35		2132
13	Donnie Neuenberger	12	16	DNQ	38	22	8	11	20	22	21	12	15	9	15	18	16	18		9	26	2081
14	Ned Combs	31	28	5	5	5	24	DNQ	25	24	8				7	10	10	3		8	23	1899
15	Gary Moore	26	12	6	28	11	19	8	6	15	14	17	14	12						14	20	1792
16	Greg Goodell	DNQ	DNQ	DNQ	24	20	18	14		19		14	19	13	13		18		11	18		1503
17	Mickey York	16	8	24	13	9		28			12		12	23			17			1	17	1441
18	John Whaley		DNQ	23	35	27	10	5	18	10	11	22	8	15								1348
19	George Crenshaw	15	24	18	21		12	13	21								14		18	**13**	12	1250
20	Chad Branham		14		22	6	25	DNQ	10	30			22	16	DNQ					36	28	1155
21	Steve Barnes	20	27		29	16	27	27								17	19	8	16	33	30	1152
22	Keith Wilson	18		7	30		3	18		29		8			22				17	27		1111
23	Ernie Yarborough	21	9	2	32			3		6			5	6								1095
24	Eric Rogers	DNQ	19	20	36			24	4	12		21			19		15			32		1067
25	Bryan Gandy	36	15	26	37	24	13	6	14	20	19											1005
26	Mike Swaim Jr.	**1***	4	1	**41**			**20***									27				1*	925
27	Mark Ellington	39	25	21	20	25	9	25	16		13											890
28	Danny Bagwell	5			19							18							20	3	2	808
29	Robert Luckadoo	35							27	13	22		10	10	28							708
30	Danny Snell	DNQ						DNQ	12	17			DNQ		DNQ				14	16		698
31	Mike McConnell			DNQ		15	22			14			11		11							666
32	Brandon Ward			DNQ		26					15			25	8						6	659
33	Charlie Smith			DNQ		29					17	15		20	DNQ	21						631
34	Randy Humphrey												20		12	15				4	24	599
35	Christian Elder	10	18	25	8			19														579
36	Wally Leatherwood	DNQ			18	21		DNQ						19	DNQ			14				568
37	Tim Nichols									4			6			2				29		556
38	Perry Whisnant		17	15			7			28			24									546
39	Justin Hobgood								19	5	20		29	22								537
40	Brett Dysart		DNQ	DNQ		14	28	23	22													531
41	Will Hobgood	41						2												20	5	468
42	Keith Roggen																26		9	10	21	457
43	Davis Myers	DNQ	21	12			17		24													452
44	Roger Moser	22			40					DNQ			21							DNQ	22	450
45	Brent Moore		23	13	31	13																412
46	Derrick Kelley	7															6			19		402
47	Brandon Head														27		12			28	19	394
48	A. J. Frank	40			16				7											31		374
49	Mark Dysart										24	24		14	DNQ							373
50	Chris Lawrence																		15	17	9	368
51	Jimmy Britts																23	13		26	DNQ	367
52	Scott Krehling				25			DNQ									25			DNQ	27	359
53	Terry Brooks	DNQ			10									DSQ							13	359
54	Dustin Blank												16		16			12				357
55	Rusty Wise	14			7			26														352
56	Larry Caudill				23								17		9							344
57	Darryl Murray	6			2																	320
58	Doug Gainey						26										20			DNQ	29	316
59	Mike Gaines					28				DNQ					DNQ						31	268
60	Johnny Chapman	DNQ			9											13						263
61	Greg Dodgens	42		11						27												249
62	Joey Miller												30		DNQ	22						228
63	David Browning												25							12		215
64	Bryan Nance											20					22					200
65	David Heitzhaus	28						15														197
66	Chris Vanadore	DNQ			39								DNQ							34		196
67	Robert Forsythe											23	DNQ									161
68	Dean Combs											4										160
69	David Amick	23						DNQ														158
70	Roger Nance	13			DNQ																	155
71	Shane Huffman														5							155
72	Maxie Bush														6							150
73	Junior Miller	8																				142
74	Edward Howell																			30	32	140
75	Johnny Smith		10																			134
76	Stephen Durham															16						115
77	Bryan Weil				17																	112
78	Pat Patterson	17																				112
79	Marty Houston														18							109
80	Billy Smith Jr.															20						103
81	Westley Huffman														20							103
82	Bobby Dayton	24																				91
83	Jimmy Fowler									26												85
84	Shane Thomas						29															76
85	Brian Sockwell	29																				76
86	Tim Hayes									DNQ												70
87	Andy Rowland	DNQ	DNQ																			65
88	Robert McCormick	DNQ						DNQ														65
89	Dean Bonessi														DNQ							64
90	Charles Powell III	34																				61
91	Clay Brown	DNQ			42																	56
92	Angie Wilson														DNQ							52
93	Steven Barfield	37																				52
94	David Probst	DNQ			DNQ																	35
95	Donny Duchesne	DNQ																				31
96	Jeff Nance				DNQ																	28
97	Billy Joyner	DNQ																				7
98	Sonny Yokum	DNQ																				1
99	Bill Hennecy	DNQ																				1
100	James Dent	DNQ																				1
101	Ken Bellamy	DNQ																				1
102	Kenny Martin				DNQ																	1
Pos	Driver	DAY	HCY	CAR	CLT	TRI	LAN	BRI	SUM	GRE	ROU	SNM	MYB	CON	HCY	LAN	STA	LOU	VOL	USA	HOM	Points

== See also ==
- 1998 NASCAR Winston Cup Series
- 1998 NASCAR Busch Series
- 1998 NASCAR Craftsman Truck Series
- 1998 NASCAR Winston West Series
- 1998 ARCA Bondo/Mar-Hyde Series
