= A. J. Frank =

American racing driver (born 1974)

- Born: September 22, 1974 (age 52); Bluffton, South Carolina, U.S.

NASCAR O'Reilly Auto Parts Series career
- 4 races run over 3 years
- Best finish: 102nd (1996)
- First race: 1996 Lysol 200 (Watkins Glen)
- Last race: 2007 Meijer 300 Presented By Oreo (Kentucky)
Wins	Top tens	Poles
0	0	0

ARCA Menards Series career
- 1 race run over 1 year
- Best finish: 115th (2010)
- First race: 2010 Menards 200 Presented by Federated Car Care (Toledo)
Wins	Top tens	Poles
0	0	0
- Statistics up to date as of January 13, 2025.

A. J. Frank (born September 22, 1974 [Evermere]) is an American former professional stock car racing driver who has competed in the NASCAR Busch Series, the NASCAR Goody's Dash Series, and the ARCA Racing Series.

Frank has also previously competed in the NASCAR Busch North Series, the NASCAR Southeast Series, the NASCAR Southwest Series, and the X-1R Pro Cup Series.

== Motorsports results ==
=== NASCAR ===
(key) (Bold - Pole position awarded by qualifying time. Italics - Pole position earned by points standings or practice time. * – Most laps led.)

==== Busch Series ====
NASCAR Busch Series results
Year	Team	No.	Make	1	2	3	4	5	6	7	8	9	10	11	12	13	14	15	16	17	18	19	20	21	22	23	24	25	26	27	28	29	30	31	32	33	34	35	NBSC	Pts	Ref
1996	Peter Frank	78	Chevy	DAY	CAR	RCH	ATL	NSV	DAR	BRI	HCY	NZH	CLT	DOV	SBO	MYB	GLN; 36	MLW	NHA	TAL	IRP	MCH	BRI	DAR	RCH	DOV	CLT	CAR	HOM										102nd	55	
2001	Jay Robinson Racing	49	Chevy	DAY	CAR	LVS	ATL	DAR; 39	BRI	TEX	NSH; 38	TAL	CAL	RCH	NHA	NZH	CLT	DOV	KEN	MLW	GLN	CHI	GTY	PPR	IRP	MCH	BRI	DAR	RCH	DOV	KAN	CLT	MEM	PHO	CAR	HOM			106th	95	
2007	Mac Hill Motorsports	56	Chevy	DAY	CAL	MXC	LVS	ATL	BRI	NSH	TEX	PHO	TAL	RCH	DAR	CLT	DOV	NSH	KEN; 37	MLW	NHA	DAY	CHI	GTY	IRP	CGV	GLN	MCH	BRI	CAL	RCH	DOV	KAN	CLT	MEM	TEX	PHO	HOM	141st	52	

==== Busch North Series ====
NASCAR Busch North Series results
Year	Team	No.	Make	1	2	3	4	5	6	7	8	9	10	11	12	13	14	15	16	17	18	19	NBNSC	Pts	Ref
1998	N/A	57	Chevy	LEE	RPS	NHA	NZH	HOL	GLN	STA	NHA	DOV	STA	NHA	GLN; 24	EPP	JEN	NHA	THU	TMP	BEE	LRP	79th	125	

==== Goody's Dash Series ====
NASCAR Goody's Dash Series results
Year	Team	No.	Make	1	2	3	4	5	6	7	8	9	10	11	12	13	14	15	16	17	18	19	20	21	NGDS	Pts	Ref
1996	N/A	N/A	N/A	DAY	HOM	MYB	SUM	NSV	TRI	CAR	HCY	FLO	BRI	SUM	GRE	SNM	BGS	MYB	LAN	STH	FLO; 19	NWS	VOL	HCY	N/A	0	
1997	Roger Wood	48	Chevy	DAY	HOM; 29	KIN	MYB	LAN	CAR	TRI	FLO	HCY	BRI	GRE	SNM	CLT; 27	MYB	LAN	SUM	STA	HCY	USA	CON	HOM	69th	158	
1998	Roger Wood	48	Pontiac	DAY; 40	HCY	CAR	CLT; 16	TRI	LAN	BRI	SUM; 7	GRE	ROU	SNM	MYB	CON	HCY	LAN	STA	LOU	VOL	USA; 31	HOM		48th	374	
1999	N/A	32	Pontiac	DAY; DNQ	HCY	CAR	CLT	BRI	LOU	SUM	GRE	ROU	STA	MYB	HCY	LAN	USA	JAC	LAN						N/A	0	

=== ARCA Racing Series ===
(key) (Bold – Pole position awarded by qualifying time. Italics – Pole position earned by points standings or practice time. * – Most laps led.)

ARCA Racing Series results
Year	Team	No.	Make	1	2	3	4	5	6	7	8	9	10	11	12	13	14	15	16	17	18	19	20	ARSC	Pts	Ref
2010	Venturini Motorsports	15	Chevy	DAY	PBE	SLM	TEX	TAL	TOL; 24	POC	MCH	IOW	MFD	POC	BLN	NJE	ISF	CHI	DSF	TOL	SLM	KAN	CAR	115th	110	

=== CARS Super Late Model Tour ===
(key)

CARS Super Late Model Tour results
Year	Team	No.	Make	1	2	3	4	5	6	7	8	9	10	CSLMTC	Pts	Ref
2015	Dick Woodman	24	Chevy	SNM	ROU	HCY; 14	SNM	TCM	MMS	ROU	CON			37th	40	
2015	Bob Schacht Motorsports	75	N/A									MYB; 20	HCY; 25	37th	40	
2016	Walker Motorsports	15F	Chevy	SNM	ROU	HCY; 7			ROU; 6	CON	MYB	HCY	SNM	20th	76	
2016	Walker Motorsports	15	Chevy				TCM; 10	GRE						20th	76	
