= Mickey York =

American racing driver (1947–2026)

- Born: Robert Mitchell York; July 30, 1947 Asheboro, North Carolina, U.S.
- Died: June 26, 2026 (aged 78) Asheboro, North Carolina, U.S.

NASCAR Goody's Dash Series career
- Debut season: 1977
- Years active: 1977–2003
- Starts: 319
- Championships: 1
- Wins: 28
- Poles: 11
- Best finish: 1st in 1992

Robert Mitchell "Mickey" York (July 30, 1947 – June 26, 2026) was an American professional stock car racing driver who competed in the NASCAR Goody's Dash Series from 1977 to 2003. He won the series championship in 1992.

== Career ==
York began his racing career in 1971, where he drove on the dirt track at Caraway Speedway, driving car No. 24.

From 1977 to 2003, York raced in the NASCAR Goody's Dash Series, where he won 28 races, eleven poles, and won the championship in 1992. He also won the Most Popular Driver award for three straight years.

== Personal life and death ==
York was a student at Randleman High School and a graduate at Nashville Diesel College. He was also the owner of Randolph Auto Parts. York died on June 26, 2026, at the age of 78.

== Motorsports results ==
=== NASCAR ===
(key) (Bold – Pole position awarded by qualifying time. Italics – Pole position earned by points standings or practice time. * – Most laps led.)

==== Goody's Dash Series ====
NASCAR Goody's Dash Series results
Year	Team	No.	Make	1	2	3	4	5	6	7	8	9	10	11	12	13	14	15	16	17	18	19	20	21	22	23	NGDS	Pts	Ref
1977	York Racing	24	Mercury	CAR	ATL	NWS	HCY	LAN	DOV	CLT	NWS	CRW; 7	SBO	CRW; 3	HCY	LAN	NSV; 5	STH	CRW; 24	HCY	DAR; 4	NWS	CAR	ATL; 8	NWS	FAY	15th	90	
1978	York Racing	24	Mercury	CAR	ATL	DAR; 16	NWS	DOV; 6	BRI	CRW; 3	CRW; 23	HCY; 2	NSV; 5	CRW; 4	LAN; 9	BRI	HCY; 24	DAR	NWS; 2	NWS; 18	CAR; 6	ATL; 1					13th	1977	
1979	York Racing	24	Mercury	DAY; 24	CAR; 5	RCH; 3	ATL	NWS	BRI	DAR; 10	NSV	CRW; 2	DOV	NSV	HCY	BRI	DAR; 23	NWS; 4	DOV	NWS	CAR; 4	ATL; 28					19th	1281	
1980	York Racing	24	Mercury	DAY; 24	ATL; 21	NWS; 29	BRI	NWS	RCH	DOV	NSV	CRW; 22	GRE; 2	BRI	DAR; 3	NWS; 2	DOV	NWS; 2	ATL; 9								15th	1177	
1981	York Racing	24	Mercury	DAY; 32	HCY	ATL; 20	BRI	NWS; 2	HCY	NWS; 15	TAL; 5	DOV; 2	TWS	STH; 24	GRE; 2	BRI	DAR; 3	RCH	NWS	DOV	NWS; 1*	CAR; 3	ATL; 4				10th	1844	
1982	York Racing	24	Mercury	DAY; 12	ATL; N/A^{†}	NWS; 25	CRW; 2	GRE; N/A^{†}	CRW; N/A^{†}	DAR; 11	NWS; 11	NWS; 2	CAR; N/A^{†}	ATL; 6													5th	1409	
1983	York Racing	24	Mercury	DAY; 38	ATL; 30	NWS	GRE	GRE	GRE	ROU	DAR	ROU	NWS; 8	LON	LON	CAR; 19	ATL; 35										32nd	428	
1984	York Racing	24	Ford	DAY; 5	NWS; 8	MLW; 11	GRE; 10	NSV; 4	LAN; 3	GRE; 5	BIR; 4	ROU; 5	HCY; 16	DAR; 7	ODS; 2		NWS; 1										3rd	2083	
1984	York Racing	24	Mercury													MAR; 14											3rd	2083	
1985	York Racing	24	Ford	DAY; 6	LAN; 2	GRE; 5	CLT; 7	ODS; 17	LAN; 8	BIR; 17	MMS; 8	ROU; 3	SBO; 24	STH; 3	ODS; 4	HCY; 2	CLT; 36										4th	1885	
1986	York Racing	19	Chevy	DAY; 31	HCY; 18	LAN; 3	ASH; 2	FCS; 8	ROU; 5	CLT; 31	POC; 27	STH; 11	LAN; 5	SBO; 5	BRI	HCY; 10	SBO; N/A^{†}	HCY; 18		NWS; 6							12th	2002	
1986	York Racing	19	Buick																CLT; 28								12th	2002	
1987	York Racing	19	Buick	DAY; 26	ASH; 4	CLT; 18	STH; 12	NWS; 3	HCY; 6	BRI; 16	SUM; 3	LAN; 3	SBO; 5	LAN; 8	CLT; 8	HCY; 6											4th	1834	
1988	York Racing	19	Buick	DAY; 26																							2nd	2233	
1988	York Racing	19	Pontiac		ROU; 2	HCY; 18	MYB; 4	CLT; 6	ASH; 8	NSV; 6	SUM; 4	STH; 5	LAN; 4	AND; 2	MYB; 2	LAN; 12	HCY; 6	**CLT**; 3									2nd	2233	
1989	York Racing	24	Pontiac	DAY; 2	FLO; 17	NRV; 7	HCY; 2	CON; 21	LAN; 17	SBO; N/A^{†}	NSV; 3	SUM; 4	LAN; 15	AND; 4	BGS; 18	MYB; 6	HCY; 3	LAN; N/A^{†}									6th	2109	
1990	York Racing	24	Pontiac	DAY; 37	NRV; 13	AND; 1*	LAN; 1	FLO; 15	STH; 18	SUM; 3	LAN; 2	BGS; 17	HCY; 1*	CON; 1**	TRI; 2	MYB; 1	ACE; 2	LAN; 18	HCY; 18								7th	2253	
1991	York Racing	24	Pontiac	DAY; 22	FIF; 4	NRV; 13	BGS; 1	FLO; 1*	LAN; 23	SUM; 1*	STH; 4	LAN; 1	BGS; 13	HCY; 12	MYB; 2	ACE; 5	HCY; 14	SHO; 3	NSV; 2								3rd	2387	
1992	York Racing	24	Pontiac	DAY; 11	HCY; 17	LON; 1	**FLO**; 1	LAN; 1*	SUM; 2	**STH**; 1*	BGS; 20	MYB; 1*	NRV; 1**	SUM; 18	**ACE**; 1*	HCY; 1*	VOL; 20										1st	2167	
1993	York Racing	24	Pontiac	DAY; 25	NSV; 2	**SUM**; 1*	VOL; 1	MAR; 1*	LON; 2	411; 6	LAN; 10	HCY; 11	SUM; N/A^{†}	FLO; 7	**BGS**; 11*	MYB; 23	NRV; 3	HCY; 2	VOL; 25								5th	2293	
1994	York Racing	24	Pontiac	DAY; 9	VOL; 9	FLO; 15	SUM; 13	CAR; 3	411; 2	HCY; 3	LAN; 15	BRI; 19	SUM; 1**	FLO; 7	**BGS**; 1*	MYB; 1*	NRV; 6	ASH; 13	VOL; 1	HCY; 4							3rd	2542	
1995	York Racing	24	Pontiac	DAY; 33	FLO; 13	LAN; 11	MYB; 23	SUM; 5	HCY; 3	CAR; 4	STH; 9	BRI; 22	SUM; 10	GRE; 19	BGS; 9	MYB; 12	NSV; 9	FLO; 20	NWS; 23	VOL; 9	HCY; 11	HOM; 30					10th	2308	
1996	York Racing	24	Pontiac	DAY; 16	HOM; 6	MYB; 30	SUM; 25	NSV; 26	TRI; 12	CAR; 10	HCY; 9	FLO; 29	BRI; 12	SUM; 19	GRE; 10	SNM; 16	BGS; 3	MYB; 7	LAN; 14	STH; 7	FLO; 2	NWS; 7	VOL; 5	HCY; 23			9th	2611	
1997	York Racing	24	Pontiac	DAY; 41	HOM; 4	KIN; 21	MYB; 29	LAN	CAR; 2	TRI; 20	FLO	HCY	BRI; 28	GRE	SNM	CLT; 17	MYB; 7	LAN	SUM	STA	HCY	USA; 10	CON; 11	HOM; 15			20th	1368	
1998	York Racing	24	Pontiac	DAY; 16	HCY; 8	CAR; 24	CLT; 13	TRI; 9	LAN	BRI; 28	SUM	GRE	ROU; 12	SNM	MYB; 12	CON; 23	HCY	LAN	STA; 17	LOU	VOL	USA; 1	HOM; 17				17th	1441	
1999	York Racing	24	Pontiac	DAY; 41	HCY; 28	CAR; 15	CLT; 15	BRI; 14	LOU	SUM	GRE	ROU; 9	STA	MYB; DNQ	HCY	LAN	USA; 10	JAC	LAN								25th	818	
2000	York Racing	24	Pontiac	DAY; 37	MON	STA	JAC	CAR; 21	CLT	SBO	ROU	LOU	SUM	GRE	SNM	MYB	BRI	HCY	JAC	USA	LAN						60th	152	
2001	York Racing	24	Pontiac	DAY; 11	ROU							DAY; 6	GRE	SNM	NRV	MYB; 19	BRI; 3	ACE; 17	JAC	USA	NSH						25th	785	
2001	N/A	6	Mercury			DAR; 28	CLT; 38	LOU	JAC	KEN	SBO																25th	785	
2002	York Racing	24	Pontiac	DAY; 36	HAR	ROU	LON	CLT; 15	KEN	MEM	GRE	SNM	SBO	MYB	BRI	MOT	ATL										55th	173	
2003	York Racing	24	Pontiac	DAY; 16	OGL	CLT; 6	SBO; 26	GRE; 25	KEN; 5	BRI; 27	ATL; 23																16th	769	
^{†} - Results/participation unknown

Sporting positions
Preceded by Johnny Chapman	NASCAR Goody's Dash Series Champion; 1992	Succeeded by Rodney Orr
