= Pete Orr (racing driver) =

American stock car racing driver (1956-2002)

Charles "Pete" Orr
- Born: July 29, 1956; Miami, Florida, U.S.
- Died: November 18, 2002 (aged 46); Montverde, Florida, U.S.
- Cause of death: Lymphoma

NASCAR O'Reilly Auto Parts Series career
- 6 races run over 2 years
- Best finish: 65th (1996)
- First race: 1995 Gatorade 200 (Darlington)
- Last race: 1996 Goody's Headache Powder 250 (Bristol)
Wins	Top tens	Poles
0	0	0

Charles "Pete" Orr (July 29, 1956 – November 18, 2002) was an American stock car racing driver. Regarded as a superstar in Florida late model competition, Orr competed primarily in the lower levels of racing, but did have a brief NASCAR Busch Series career; his death from lymphoma in 2002 led to the State of Florida enacting insurance reform.

== Career ==
Born in Miami but a long-time resident of Montverde, Florida, Orr competed in local short track racing events throughout Florida starting in the 1970s. He ran for Rookie of the Year in the NASCAR Winston All-American Challenge Series, later renamed the Slim Jim All Pro Series, in 1988; he competed in the series over the next several years, both as a driver and as crew chief for fellow Florida racer David Russell. Orr continued competing in local events as well, winning the FASCAR Triple Crown Series in 1991. In 1992 he won the prestigious Orange Blossom 100 at New Smyrna Speedway for the second consecutive year; he also won the speedway's World Series of Asphalt championship.

== Busch Series ==
In 1995, having left local competition in an attempt to make it at the top levels of the sport, Orr made his debut in NASCAR national touring competition, driving for David Ridling in the Busch Grand National Series. Orr was 39; he had promised his wife he would retire if he hadn't reached the Busch Series level by age 40. Driving the No. 88 Chevrolet with sponsorship from Farmer's Choice Fertilizer, he ran two races in the 1995 season, at Darlington Raceway and Charlotte Motor Speedway, with a best finish of 29th; he failed to qualify for the two final races of the season.

Remaining with Ridling's team for the 1996 season, Orr planned full-time in the Busch Series, declaring his intention to compete for Rookie of the Year honors; in the season-opening Goody's 300 at Daytona International Speedway, Orr qualified tenth for the series' biggest race of the year, but was involved in an accident, finishing 40th of 46 cars and completing only 50 laps. Orr failed to qualify three times over the next six races, with his best finish in the three races which he qualified for being 34th, at Richmond International Raceway in the third race of the season, and Bristol International Raceway in the seventh. Bristol's Goody's Headache Powder 250 would be Orr's final race in NASCAR's higher levels; before the race the following week at Hickory Motor Speedway, Ridling released him from the team, replacing him with Kevin Lepage, who would go on to win at the season's final race.

Following his aborted Busch Series career, Orr returned to local short track competition, racing as far afield as DeSoto Speedway in Florida and Jennerstown Speedway in Pennsylvania in 2000.

== Legacy ==
Suffering from lymphoma, he retired from racing in 2001, having scored over 300 wins in racing competition Orr became a victim of insurance fraud, with over $250,000 in claims being refused by his insurance company; the racing community assisted in paying for his medical treatment. Orr died of his cancer on November 18, 2002; he was survived by his wife Terri, three sons, and a daughter.

Orr's insurance issues led to the Florida Legislature passing insurance reform following his death; the measure was referred to as the "Pete Orr Insurance Anti-Fraud Act", or more simply as the "Pete Orr Bill". from 2003 until 2015, the Orange Blossom 100 was named the Pete Orr Memorial, with the family supporting the race; Orr had won the event four times, more than any other driver.

== Motorsports career results ==
=== NASCAR ===
(key) (Bold - Pole position awarded by time. Italics - Pole position earned by points standings. * – Most laps led.)

==== Busch Series ====
NASCAR Busch Series results
Year	Team	No.	Make	1	2	3	4	5	6	7	8	9	10	11	12	13	14	15	16	17	18	19	20	21	22	23	24	25	26	NBGNC	Pts	Ref
1995	Ridling Motorsports	88	Chevy	DAY	CAR	RCH	ATL	NSV	DAR	BRI	HCY	NHA	NZH	CLT	DOV	MYB	GLN	MLW	TAL	SBO	IRP	MCH	BRI	DAR; 29	RCH	DOV	CLT; 31	CAR; DNQ	HOM; DNQ	80th	146	
1996	Ridling Motorsports	88	Chevy	DAY; 40	CAR; DNQ	RCH; 34	ATL; 36	NSV; DNQ	DAR; DNQ	BRI; 34	HCY	NZH	CLT	DOV	SBO	MYB	GLN	MLW	NHA	TAL	IRP	MCH	BRI	DAR	RCH	DOV	CLT	CAR	HOM	65th	220	

=== ARCA Bondo/Mar-Hyde Series ===
(key) (Bold – Pole position awarded by qualifying time. Italics – Pole position earned by points standings or practice time. * – Most laps led.)

ARCA Bondo/Mar-Hyde Series results
Year	Team	No.	Make	1	2	3	4	5	6	7	8	9	10	11	12	13	14	15	16	17	18	19	20	21	22	23	24	25	ABSC	Pts	Ref
1996	Ridling Motorsports	88	Chevy	DAY; DNQ	ATL	SLM	TAL	FIF	LVL	CLT	CLT	KIL	FRS	POC	MCH	FRS	TOL	POC	MCH	INF	SBS	ISF	DSF	KIL	SLM	WIN	CLT	ATL	NA	0	
