= Donnie Apple =

American racing driver (born 1962)

- Nationality: American
- Born: December 23, 1962 (age 63) Denton, North Carolina, U.S.

NASCAR Goody's Dash Series career
- Debut season: 1998
- Years active: 1997–1998
- Starts: 21
- Championships: 0
- Wins: 0
- Poles: 0
- Best finish: 7th in 1998
- Statistics up to date as of January 7, 2025.

Donnie Apple (born December 23, 1962) is an American professional stock car racing driver who competed in the NASCAR Goody's Dash Series from 1997 to 1998.

Apple has also competed in the NASCAR Advance Auto Parts Weekly Series, and was a frequent competitor at Caraway Speedway.

== Motorsports results ==
=== NASCAR ===
(key) (Bold – Pole position awarded by qualifying time. Italics – Pole position earned by points standings or practice time. * – Most laps led.)

==== Busch Series ====
NASCAR Busch Series results
Year	Team	No.	Make	1	2	3	4	5	6	7	8	9	10	11	12	13	14	15	16	17	18	19	20	21	22	23	24	25	26	NBSC	Pts	Ref
1996	B.C. Racing	7	Chevy	DAY	CAR	RCH	ATL	NSV	DAR	BRI	HCY	NZH	CLT	DOV	SBO	MYB	GLN	MLW	NHA	TAL	IRP	MCH	BRI	DAR	RCH	DOV	CLT	CAR; DNQ	HOM	N/A	0	

==== Goody's Dash Series ====
NASCAR Goody's Dash Series results
Year	Team	No.	Make	1	2	3	4	5	6	7	8	9	10	11	12	13	14	15	16	17	18	19	20	21	NGDS	Pts	Ref
1997	N/A	99	Pontiac	DAY	HOM	KIN	MYB	LAN	CAR; 8	TRI	FLO	HCY	BRI	GRE	SNM	CLT	MYB	LAN	SUM	STA	HCY	USA	CON	HOM	73rd	142	
1998	N/A	8	Pontiac	DAY; 19																					7th	2540	
1998	N/A	51	Pontiac		HCY; 11	CAR; 14	CLT; 26	TRI; 8	LAN; 14	BRI; 9	SUM; 11	GRE; 11	ROU; 4	SNM; 9	MYB; 28	CON; 18	HCY; 14	LAN; 11	STA; 8	LOU; 6	VOL; 3	USA; 22	HOM; 7		7th	2540	
