= Randy LaJoie =

American racing driver (born 1961)

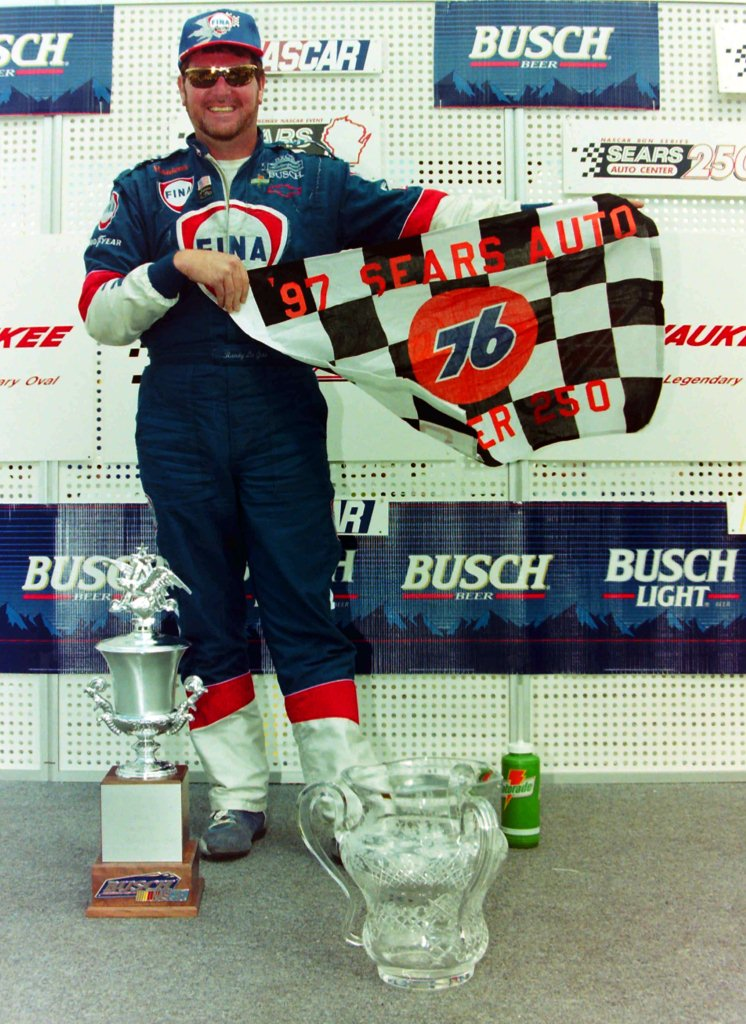
- LaJoie in 1997
- Born: Randall Joseph LaJoie; August 28, 1961 (age 65); Norwalk, Connecticut, U.S.
- Achievements: 1996, 1997 NASCAR Busch Series champion 1985 NASCAR North Tour champion 1981 Danbury Fair Racearena modified sportsman champion 1997, 1999, 2001 NAPA Auto Parts 300 winner New England Auto Racers Hall of Fame (2016)
- Awards: 1983 NASCAR North Tour Rookie of the Year; Named one of NASCAR's 75 Greatest Drivers (2023)

NASCAR Cup Series career
- 44 races run over 12 years
- Best finish: 40th (1995)
- First race: 1985 Coca-Cola 500 (Atlanta)
- Last race: 2005 Advance Auto Parts 500 (Martinsville)
Wins	Top tens	Poles
0	3	0

NASCAR O'Reilly Auto Parts Series career
- 350 races run over 19 years
- Best finish: 1st (1996, 1997)
- First race: 1986 Dixie Cup 200 (Darlington)
- Last race: 2006 O'Reilly Challenge (Texas)
- First win: 1996 Meridian Advantage 200 (Nazareth)
- Last win: 2001 Sam's Town 250 (Memphis)
Wins	Top tens	Poles
15	118	9

NASCAR FedEx Freight Truck Series career
- 7 races run over 2 years
- Best finish: 38th (2004)
- First race: 2003 Las Vegas 350 (Las Vegas)
- Last race: 2004 O'Reilly 200 (Bristol)
Wins	Top tens	Poles
0	1	0
- Statistics up to date as of March 20, 2013.

Randall Joseph LaJoie (born August 28, 1961) is an American former stock car racing driver and businessman. He won the championship in 1996 and 1997. He is the father of NASCAR driver Corey LaJoie and owns The Joie of Seating.

== Early racing career ==
LaJoie started racing go-karts when he was eleven years old. In 1980, he began racing in full-bodied racecars. He was the 1981 track champion in the sportsman division at the Danbury Fair Racearena. When Danbury closed that off-season, he moved to the Waterford Speedbowl where he won Modified Rookie Of The Year honors in 1982.

In 1983, LaJoie moved to the NASCAR North Tour, and he was the series' Rookie Of The Year. That season, he made his first attempt at making the Daytona 500, but did not qualify. One year later, he suffered a horrific crash in the Gatorade Twin 125's race and failed to qualify once again, he won the consolation race the following year. In 1985, he scored five victories in the North Tour on his way to the series championship; LaJoie was not awarded the championship until 1988, as a lawsuit regarding a disqualification at Catamount Speedway was not resolved until then.

== Early NASCAR career ==
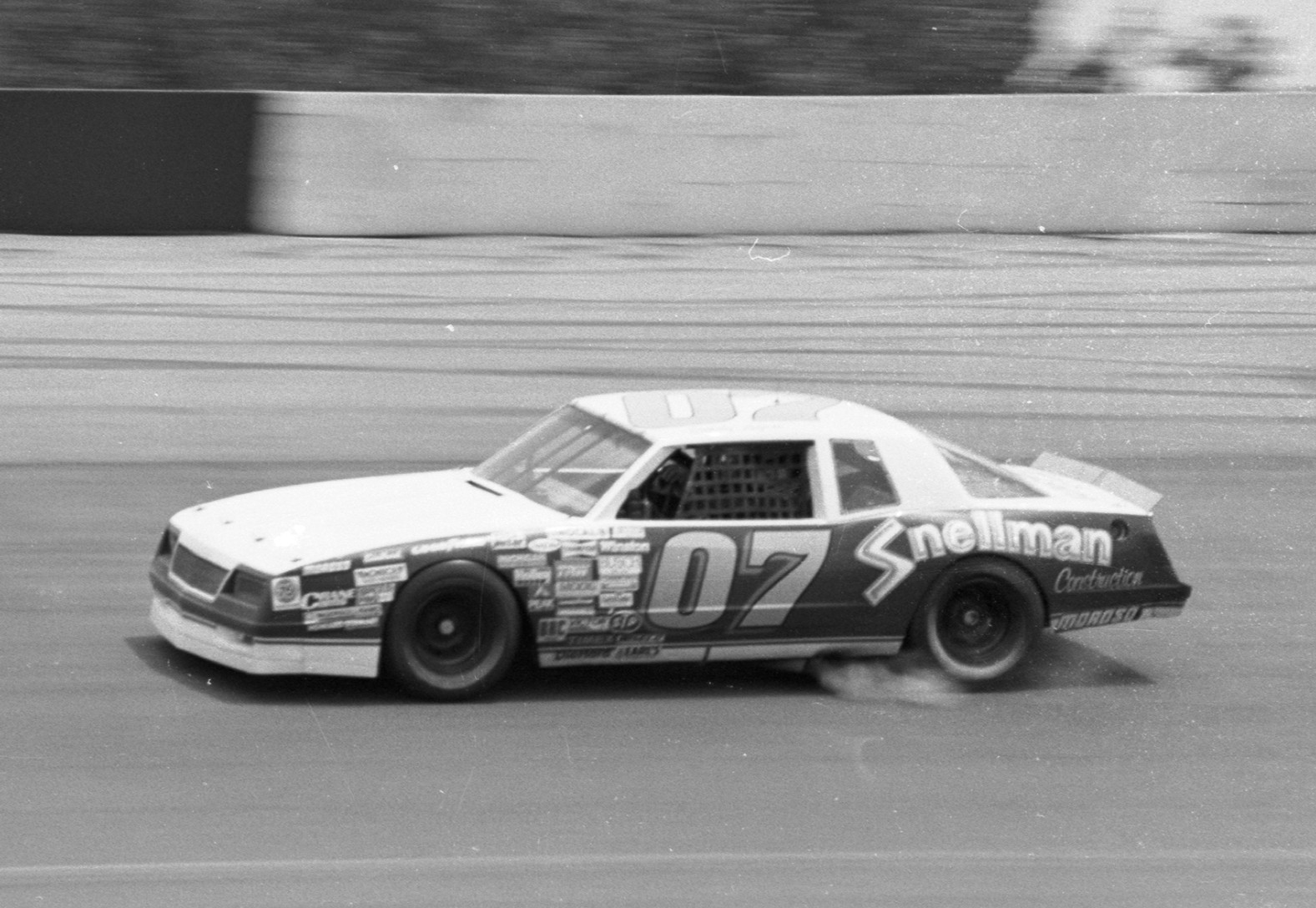
LaJoie's 1986 Winston Cup car

LaJoie made his NASCAR Winston Cup debut in 1985 at Atlanta Motor Speedway. Driving the No. 07 Snellman Construction Chevrolet owned by Bob Johnson, he started sixteenth and finished 14th. He ran his next race the following season at Pocono Raceway, where he finished 29th after suffering engine failure. He also made his Busch Series debut that season, running four races in his own No. 03 Pontiac, posting a tenth-place finish at Charlotte Motor Speedway. He ran another race in 1987 at Dover International Speedway and finished tenth. After a third-place finish the following season, he joined Frank Cicci Racing mid-way through 1989 and had a career-best second-place run at Hickory Motor Speedway. He ended the season 26th in points.

LaJoie did not return to Cicci in 1990, and ran a handful of Busch Races in his own No. 71, his best finish was 23rd at Richmond. He did not run another NASCAR-sanctioned race until 1993, when he got selected to run the No. 20 Fina car owned by Dick Moroso at Talladega. This would turn out to be a shrewd career move for LaJoie as he ran up front with the leaders all afternoon and finished a surprising second. This got LaJoie five more races for Moroso and one for BACE Motorsports in the Busch Series. His best finish was second, twice. In 1994, he was a thought by some to be a dark horse for the championship. He drove for Moroso full-time in the No. 20 Fina Lube Ford that season posting seven top-tens. LaJoie led the point standings early in the season before a string of poor results, also a lack of performance dropped him to 16th in the final point standings. He also ran three Cup races, finishing in the top-20 in all three of them that season.

== 1995–2002 ==
In 1995, LaJoie was called up to the Cup series again, driving the No. 22 MBNA Pontiac Grand Prix for Bill Davis Racing. LaJoie ran thirteen races for Davis in his rookie season before he was released midway through the year. Following his departure, he returned to Busch to drive the No. 64 for Dennis Shoemaker. He had three top-tens and a pole at Richmond in nine starts. The following season, he was hired by BACE Motorsports to drive its No. 74 entry. LaJoie won five races over the course of the season and clinched his first Busch Series championship. He followed that up with another five wins and his second straight championship in 1997. After falling back to fourth in the standings in 1998, as well as dealing with a feud with team owner Bill Baumgardner, LaJoie left BACE at the end of the season. He returned to the Cup series that season driving nine races for Hendrick Motorsports.

LaJoie signed to drive the No. 1 Chevrolet Monte Carlo for James Finch in 1999, despite the fact that the team lacked major sponsorship. After a season-opening victory at the NAPA Auto Parts 300, Bob Evans Restaurants came on board as the team's sponsor. Despite the added funding, LaJoie dropped to tenth in points. He moved up to seventh in the standings the next season with one win, but chose to depart the team at the end of the season for NEMCO Motorsports. Driving the No. 7 with a sponsorship from Kleenex, LaJoie won two more races but again fell to 12th in points. He had fourteen top-ten finishes in 2002 and moved up one spot in the points.

== Recent years ==
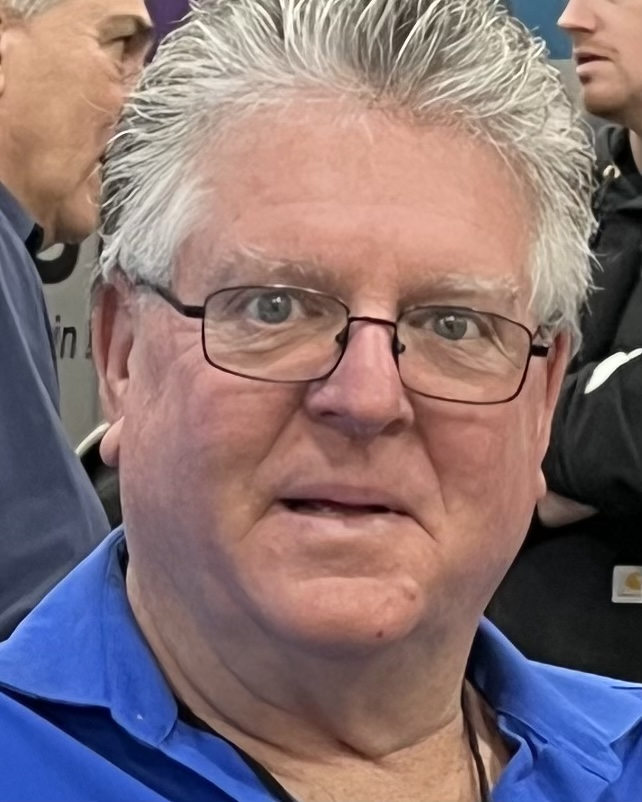
LaJoie in 2023

LaJoie returned to the No. 7 team in 2003, and won two poles, but was dismissed from the ride midway through the season. He filled out the year with one race apiece for Innovative Motorsports and FitzBradshaw Racing, as well as a Craftsman Truck race for Kevin Harvick Incorporated. He began the 2004 season in FitzBradshaw's No. 82 car and ran five races with a best finish of thirteenth, before moving on, running one race each for Marsh Racing and Tommy Baldwin Racing. He also teamed with HT Motorsports in the Craftsman Truck Series for six races, finishing eighth at Gateway. In the Cup series, he had a 43rd place finish for Hover Motorsports at Richmond, and also ran two races in the No. 98 Ford Taurus for Mach 1 Racing, his best finish being 36th.

Mach 1 switched to the No. 34 Chevy in 2005, and he began the season with them before he was released. He reunited with Cicci in the Busch Series with Dollar General sponsorship and posted three top-ten finishes, finishing 19th in points. Dollar General left the team at season's end, leaving LaJoie without a full-time ride. He had signed to drive for Mach 1, which was under new management again in 2005, but was replaced early in the season by teammate Chad Chaffin. He drove one race apiece in the Busch Series for Davis Motorsports, Jay Robinson Racing, and Vision Racing. He also was a test driver for Richard Childress Racing, filling in for Kevin Harvick in the No. 21 United States Coast Guard Chevy during practice and qualifying sessions.

LaJoie has not run a NASCAR-sanctioned race since 2006, focusing on team ownership for his son Corey, who finished second in the 2012 K&N Pro Series East championship to Kyle Larson despite five wins in the series.

In 2016, LaJoie was inducted into the New England Auto Racers Hall of Fame.

== Television work and suspension ==
In addition to his racing seat business, The Joie of Seating, LaJoie was also a part-time co-host of The Driver's Seat with John Kernan on Sirius Satellite Radio's NASCAR channel 128. He also did television commentary for the ORP and Montreal Busch Series races.

On June 22, 2010, LaJoie was suspended indefinitely from NASCAR for violating their substance abuse policy while working as a spotter on the No. 18 Nationwide Series car. He had smoked marijuana with some race fans following the Coca-Cola 600 in Charlotte and took responsibility for his actions. On August 25, 2010, LaJoie was reinstated by NASCAR after a two-month suspension.

== Motorsports career results ==
=== NASCAR ===
(key) (Bold – Pole position awarded by qualifying time. Italics – Pole position earned by points standings or practice time. * – Most laps led.)

==== Nextel Cup Series ====
NASCAR Nextel Cup Series results
Year	Team	No.	Make	1	2	3	4	5	6	7	8	9	10	11	12	13	14	15	16	17	18	19	20	21	22	23	24	25	26	27	28	29	30	31	32	33	34	35	36	NNCC	Pts	Ref
1984	Bob Johnson Racing	07	Chevy	DAY; DNQ	RCH	CAR	ATL	BRI	NWS	DAR	MAR	TAL	NSV	DOV	CLT	RSD	POC	MCH	DAY	NSV	POC	TAL	MCH	BRI	DAR	RCH	DOV	MAR	CLT	NWS	CAR	ATL	RSD							NA	-	
1985	Bob Johnson Racing	07	Chevy	DAY; DNQ	RCH	CAR	ATL; 14	BRI	DAR	NWS	MAR	TAL	DOV	CLT	RSD	POC	MCH	DAY	POC	TAL	MCH	BRI	DAR	RCH	DOV	MAR	NWS	CLT	CAR	ATL	RSD									NA	0	
1986	Bob Johnson Racing	07	Chevy	DAY; DNQ	RCH	CAR	ATL	BRI	DAR	NWS	MAR	TAL	DOV	CLT	RSD	POC; 29	MCH	DAY	POC	TAL	GLN	MCH	BRI	DAR	RCH	DOV	MAR	NWS	CLT	CAR	ATL	RSD								107th	76	
1988	Wawak Racing	74	Chevy	DAY	RCH	CAR	ATL	DAR	BRI	NWS	MAR	TAL	CLT	DOV	RSD	POC	MCH	DAY	POC	TAL	GLN	MCH	BRI	DAR	RCH	DOV; 37	MAR	CLT; DNQ	NWS	CAR	PHO	ATL								NA	0	
1989	Wawak Racing	74	Pontiac	DAY; DNQ	CAR	ATL	RCH	DAR	BRI	NWS	MAR	TAL	CLT	DOV	SON																									83rd	79	
1989	Rosenblum Racing	63	Chevy													POC; 28	MCH	DAY	POC	TAL	GLN	MCH	BRI	DAR	RCH	DOV	MAR	CLT	NWS	CAR	PHO	ATL								83rd	79	
1990	Linro Motorsports	13	Buick	DAY	RCH	CAR	ATL	DAR	BRI	NWS	MAR	TAL	CLT	DOV	SON	POC; 33	MCH	DAY	POC; 38	TAL	GLN	MCH	BRI	DAR	RCH	DOV	MAR	NWS	CLT	CAR	PHO	ATL								73rd	113	
1991	Linro Motorsports	13	Buick	DAY	RCH	CAR	ATL	DAR	BRI	NWS	MAR	TAL	CLT	DOV	SON	POC; 29	MCH	DAY	POC	TAL	GLN	MCH	BRI	DAR	RCH	DOV	MAR	NWS	CLT											50th	304	
1991	Cale Yarborough Motorsports	66	Pontiac																											CAR; 24	PHO; 32	ATL; 31								50th	304	
1994	Moroso Racing	20	Ford	DAY	CAR	RCH	ATL	DAR	BRI	NWS	MAR	TAL	SON	CLT; 20	DOV	POC	MCH	DAY	NHA; 20	POC	TAL	IND; DNQ	GLN	MCH	BRI	DAR	RCH	DOV	MAR	NWS	CLT	CAR	PHO							48th	312	
1994	Taylor Racing	02	Ford																															ATL; 19						48th	312	
1995	Bill Davis Racing	22	Pontiac	DAY; 29	CAR; 25	RCH; 27	ATL; 39	DAR; 16	BRI; 12	NWS; 23	MAR; DNQ	TAL; 13	SON; 32	CLT; 23	DOV; 23	POC; 40	MCH; 41	DAY	NHA	POC																				40th	1133	
1995	Dick Brooks Racing	40	Pontiac																		TAL; 40	IND	GLN	MCH	BRI	DAR	RCH	DOV	MAR	NWS	CLT	CAR	PHO	ATL						40th	1133	
1997	BACE Motorsports	74	Chevy	DAY	CAR	RCH	ATL	DAR	TEX; DNQ	BRI	MAR	SON	TAL	CLT	DOV	POC	MCH	CAL	DAY	NHA	POC	IND	GLN	MCH	BRI	DAR	RCH	NHA	DOV	MAR	CLT	TAL	CAR	PHO	ATL					NA	-	
1998	Hendrick Motorsports	50	Chevy	DAY	CAR	LVS	ATL	DAR; 38	BRI; 10	TEX; 25	MAR; 5	TAL; 10	CAL; 36	CLT; 38	DOV; 43	RCH; 31	MCH	POC	SON	NHA	POC	IND	GLN	MCH	BRI	NHA	DAR	RCH	DOV	MAR	CLT	TAL	DAY	PHO	CAR	ATL				49th	768	
1999	No Fear Racing	14	Ford	DAY	CAR	LVS	ATL	DAR	TEX; 40	BRI	MAR	TAL	CAL	RCH	CLT; DNQ	DOV	MCH	POC	SON	DAY	NHA	POC	IND	GLN	MCH	BRI	DAR	RCH	NHA; 37	DOV	MAR	CLT	TAL	CAR	PHO	HOM	ATL			61st	95	
2004	Hover Motorsports	80	Ford	DAY	CAR	LVS	ATL	DAR	BRI	TEX	MAR	TAL	CAL	RCH; 43	CLT	DOV	POC	MCH	SON	DAY	CHI	NHA	POC	IND	GLN	MCH	BRI	CAL	RCH	NHA	DOV	TAL	KAN	CLT	MAR					68th	126	
2004	Mach 1 Motorsports	96	Ford																																	ATL; DNQ				68th	126	
2004	Mach 1 Motorsports	98	Ford																																		PHO; 42	DAR; 36	HOM; DNQ	68th	126	
2005	Mach 1 Motorsports	34	Chevy	DAY; DNQ	CAL; 42	LVS; 36	ATL; DNQ	BRI; DNQ	MAR; 42	TEX; DNQ	PHO	TAL	DAR	RCH	CLT	DOV	POC	MCH	SON	DAY	CHI	NHA	POC	IND	GLN	MCH	BRI	CAL	RCH	NHA	DOV	TAL	KAN	CLT	MAR	ATL	TEX	PHO	HOM	66th	134	
2006	Front Row Motorsports	64	Chevy	DAY; DNQ																																				NA	-	
2006	Front Row Motorsports	34	Dodge		CAL; DNQ																																			NA	-	
2006	Front Row Motorsports	64	Dodge			LVS; DNQ	ATL	BRI	MAR	TEX	PHO	TAL	RCH	DAR	CLT	DOV	POC	MCH	SON	DAY	CHI	NHA	POC	IND	GLN	MCH	BRI	CAL	RCH	NHA	DOV	KAN	TAL	CLT	MAR	ATL	TEX	PHO	HOM	NA	-	

===== Daytona 500 =====
Year	Team	Manufacturer	Start	Finish
1984	Bob Johnson Racing	Chevrolet	DNQ	
1985	Bob Johnson Racing	Chevrolet	DNQ	
1986	Bob Johnson Racing	Chevrolet	DNQ	
1989	Wawak Racing	Pontiac	DNQ	
1995	Bill Davis Racing	Pontiac	24	29
2005	Mach 1 Racing	Chevrolet	DNQ	
2006	Front Row Motorsports	Chevrolet	DNQ	

==== Busch Series ====
NASCAR Busch Series results
Year	Team	No.	Make	1	2	3	4	5	6	7	8	9	10	11	12	13	14	15	16	17	18	19	20	21	22	23	24	25	26	27	28	29	30	31	32	33	34	35	NBSC	Pts	Ref
1986	LaJoie Racing	03	Pontiac	DAY	CAR	HCY	MAR	BRI	DAR; 11	SBO	LGY	JFC	DOV; 21	CLT; 10	SBO	HCY	ROU	IRP	SBO	RAL																			47th	364	
1986	LaJoie Racing	07	Pontiac																		OXF; 36	SBO	HCY	LGY	ROU	BRI	DAR	RCH	DOV	MAR	ROU	CLT	CAR	MAR					47th	364	
1987	LaJoie Racing	04	Olds	DAY	HCY	MAR	DAR	BRI	LGY	SBO	CLT	DOV	IRP	ROU	JFC	OXF	SBO	HCY	RAL	LGY	ROU	BRI	JFC	DAR	RCH	DOV; 10	MAR	CLT	CAR	MAR									85th	-	
1988	LaJoie Racing	66	Olds	DAY	HCY	CAR	MAR	DAR	BRI	LNG	NZH	SBO	NSV	CLT	DOV	ROU	LAN	LVL	MYB	OXF; 3	SBO	HCY	LNG	IRP	ROU	BRI	DAR	RCH	DOV	MAR									97th	43	
1988	LaJoie Racing	71	Olds																												CLT; 40	CAR	MAR						97th	43	
1989	LaJoie Racing	71	Olds	DAY; 31	CAR	MAR	HCY	DAR; 23	BRI	NZH	SBO	LAN	NSV	CLT																									26th	1542	
1989	LaJoie Racing	71	Pontiac												DOV; 10	ROU	LVL	VOL	MYB	SBO																			26th	1542	
1989	Frank Cicci Racing	34	Buick																		HCY; 2	DUB; 15	IRP; 12	ROU; 25	BRI; 11	DAR; 18	RCH; 11	DOV; 20	MAR; 27	CLT; 14	CAR; 8	MAR; 23							26th	1542	
1990	LaJoie Racing	71	Ford	DAY; DNQ	RCH; 23	CAR; 37	MAR	HCY	DAR	BRI	LAN	SBO	NZH	HCY	CLT																								60th	326	
1990	LaJoie Racing	71	Buick													DOV; DNQ	ROU	VOL	MYB	OXF; 28	NHA; 28	SBO	DUB	IRP	ROU	BRI	DAR	RCH	DOV; 31	MAR	CLT	NHA; 44	CAR	MAR					60th	326	
1993	Moroso Racing	20	Chevy	DAY	CAR	RCH	DAR	BRI	HCY	ROU	MAR	NZH	CLT	DOV	MYB	GLN	MLW	TAL; 2	IRP	MCH	NHA		DAR; 2				CLT; 12	MAR	CAR; 8	HCY	ATL; 27								36th	1045	
1993	Moroso Racing	20	Olds																			BRI; 32		RCH; 12	DOV														36th	1045	
1993	BACE Motorsports	74	Chevy																							ROU; 4													36th	1045	
1994	Moroso Racing	20	Chevy	DAY; 28	CAR; 4	RCH; 31	ATL; 7	MAR; 4	DAR; 3	HCY; 2	BRI; 27	ROU; 24	NHA; 19	NZH; 26	CLT; 25	DOV; 42	MYB; 24	GLN; 12	MLW; 37	SBO; 16	TAL; 15	HCY; 15	IRP; 18	MCH; 33	BRI; 36	**DAR**; 27	RCH; 19	DOV; 6	CLT	MAR; 30	CAR; 9								16th	2837	
1995	Shoemaker Racing	64	Chevy	DAY	CAR	RCH	ATL	NSV	DAR	BRI	HCY	NHA	NZH	CLT	DOV	MYB	GLN	MLW	TAL; 34	SBO	IRP; 15	MCH; 3	BRI; 22	DAR; 27	**RCH**; 9	DOV; 18	CLT; 14	CAR; 9	HOM; DNQ										37th	1029	
1996	BACE Motorsports	74	Chevy	DAY; 7	CAR; 7	RCH; 6	ATL; 28	NSV; 21	DAR; 12	BRI; 6	HCY; 3	NZH; 1	CLT; 5*	DOV; 1	**SBO**; 5*	MYB; 18	GLN; 30	MLW; 3	NHA; 1*	TAL; 3	**IRP**; 1*	MCH; 10	BRI; 29	DAR; 5	RCH; 8	DOV; 1	CLT; 6	CAR; 9	HOM; 10										1st	3714	
1997	BACE Motorsports	74	Chevy	DAY; 1*	CAR; 3	RCH; 8	ATL; 16	LVS; 29	DAR; 1*	HCY; 2*	TEX; 9	BRI; 3	NSV; 6	TAL; 12	NHA; 7	NZH; 3	CLT; 10	DOV; 3	SBO; 1*	GLN; 21	MLW; 1	MYB; 3	GTY; 17	**IRP**; 1*	MCH; 17	**BRI**; 4	DAR; 18	RCH; 2	DOV; 2*	CLT; 15	CAL; 10	CAR; 20	HOM; 2						1st	4381	
1998	BACE Motorsports	74	Chevy	DAY; 5	CAR; 7	LVS; 18	NSV; 4	DAR; 23	BRI; 25	TEX; 6	HCY; 23	TAL; 23	NHA; 5	NZH; 42	CLT; 14	DOV; 11	RCH; 11	PPR; 3	GLN; 37	MLW; 10	MYB; 1*	CAL; 16	SBO; 2	IRP; 4	MCH; 16	BRI; 31	DAR; 19	RCH; 30	DOV; 37	CLT; 29	GTY; 7	CAR; 30	ATL; 41	HOM; 9					4th	3543	
1999	Phoenix Racing	1	Chevy	DAY; 1*	CAR; 4	LVS; 15	ATL; 26	DAR; 43	TEX; 17	NSV; 38	BRI; 36	TAL; 9*	CAL; 34	NHA; 4	RCH; 42	NZH; 20	CLT; 13	DOV; 27	SBO; 24	GLN; 17	MLW; 14	MYB; 2*	PPR; 13	GTY; 2	IRP; 13	MCH; 40	BRI; 11	DAR; 16	RCH; 33	DOV; 2	CLT; 38	CAR; 26	MEM; 26	PHO; 17	HOM; 29				10th	3379	
2000	Phoenix Racing	1	Chevy	DAY; 7	CAR; 11	LVS; 9	ATL; 9	DAR; 18	BRI; 5	TEX; 8	NSV; 1	TAL; 36	CAL; 16	RCH; 21	NHA; 39	CLT; 22	DOV; 25	SBO; 23	MYB; 14	GLN; 15	MLW; 3	NZH; 8	PPR; 41	GTY; 11	IRP; 13	MCH; 26	BRI; 31	DAR; 14	RCH; 13	DOV; 31	CLT; 15	CAR; 18	MEM; 4	PHO; 13					7th	3670	
2000	Phoenix Racing	51	Ford																																HOM; 24				7th	3670	
2001	Evans Motorsports	7	Pontiac	DAY; 1								TAL; 27																											12th	3578	
2001	Evans Motorsports	7	Chevy		CAR; 32	LVS; 38	ATL; 21	DAR; 26	BRI; 3	TEX; 13	NSH; 4		CAL; 30	RCH; 19	NHA; 8	NZH; 13	CLT; 22	DOV; 24	KEN; 7	MLW; 22	GLN; 19	CHI; 19	GTY; 9	PPR; 33	IRP; 13	MCH; 24	BRI; 31	DAR; 19	RCH; 34	DOV; 9	KAN; 21	CLT; 37	MEM; 1	PHO; 18	CAR; 11	HOM; 21			12th	3578	
2002	Evans Motorsports	7	Chevy	DAY; 12	CAR; 3	LVS; 7	DAR; 27	BRI; 7	TEX; 7	NSH; 6	TAL; 17	CAL; 9	RCH; 13	NHA; 6	NZH; 5	CLT; 32	DOV; 9	NSH; 36	KEN; 13	MLW; 10	DAY; 36	CHI; 17	**GTY**; 18	PPR; 20	IRP; 13	MCH; 24	BRI; 10	DAR; 20	RCH; 20	DOV; 7	KAN; 17	CLT; 38	MEM; 35	ATL; 15	CAR; 3	PHO; 16	HOM; 6		11th	4021	
2003	Evans Motorsports	7	Pontiac	DAY; 15																																			26th	1863	
2003	Evans Motorsports	7	Chevy		CAR; 4	LVS; 32	DAR; 17	BRI; 8	TEX; 34	TAL; 29	**NSH**; 32	CAL; 32	RCH; 27	GTY; 35	**NZH**; 7	CLT; 28	DOV; 26	NSH; 4	KEN; 38	MLW; 11	DAY	CHI	NHA	PPR	IRP	MCH	BRI	DAR	RCH	DOV	KAN	CLT							26th	1863	
2003	Innovative Motorsports	48	Chevy																														MEM; 30	ATL					26th	1863	
2003	FitzBradshaw Racing	82	Chevy																																PHO; 14	CAR	HOM		26th	1863	
2004	FitzBradshaw Racing	82	Chevy	DAY	CAR	LVS; 13	DAR	BRI	TEX; 23	NSH	TAL	CAL; 30	GTY	RCH	NZH; 25	CLT	DOV	NSH	KEN	MLW	DAY; 16	CHI	NHA	PPR	IRP	MCH	BRI	CAL	RCH	DOV	KAN								50th	673	
2004	Marsh Racing	31	Ford																													CLT; 17							50th	673	
2004	Michael Waltrip Racing	99	Chevy																														MEM; QL^{†}						50th	673	
2004	Tommy Baldwin Racing	6	Dodge																															ATL; 32	PHO	DAR	HOM		50th	673	
2005	Frank Cicci Racing	34	Chevy	DAY; 19	CAL; 31	MXC; 32	LVS; 8	ATL; 15	NSH; 28	BRI; 27	TEX; 26	PHO; 35	TAL; 6	DAR; 26	RCH; 26	CLT; 28	DOV; 17	NSH; 24	KEN; 21	MLW; 7	DAY; 30	CHI; 31	NHA; 39	PPR; 16	GTY; 14	IRP; 17	GLN; 21	MCH; 41		CAL; 21	RCH; 15	DOV; 42	KAN	CLT	MEM; 25	TEX	PHO; 25	HOM	19th	2886	
2005	Frank Cicci Racing	84	Chevy																										BRI; 17										19th	2886	
2006	Davis Motorsports	0	Chevy	DAY	CAL	MXC; 41	LVS	ATL	BRI	TEX	NSH	PHO	TAL	RCH	DAR																								101st	138	
2006	Jay Robinson Racing	49	Ford													CLT; 35	DOV	NSH	KEN	MLW	DAY	CHI	NHA	MAR	GTY	IRP	GLN	MCH	BRI	CAL	RCH	DOV							101st	138	
2006	Vision Racing	37	Chevy																														KAN; DNQ	CLT		TEX; 41	PHO	HOM	101st	138	
2006	Richard Childress Racing	21	Chevy																																MEM; QL^{‡}				101st	138	
^{†} - Qualified for Michael Waltrip · ^{‡} - Qualified for Kevin Harvick

==== Craftsman Truck Series ====
NASCAR Craftsman Truck Series results
Year	Team	No.	Make	1	2	3	4	5	6	7	8	9	10	11	12	13	14	15	16	17	18	19	20	21	22	23	24	25	NCTC	Pts	Ref
2003	Kevin Harvick Inc.	6	Chevy	DAY	DAR	MMR	MAR	CLT	DOV	TEX	MEM	MLW	KAN	KEN	GTW	MCH	IRP	NSH	BRI	RCH	NHA	CAL	LVS; 13	SBO	TEX	MAR	PHO	HOM	95th	124	
2004	HT Motorsports	59	Dodge	DAY; 34	ATL; 14	MAR	MFD	CLT	DOV	TEX	MEM	MLW	KAN	KEN; 32	GTW; 8	MCH; 14	IRP	NSH	BRI; 35	RCH	NHA	LVS	CAL	TEX	MAR	PHO	DAR	HOM	38th	570	

=== ARCA Permatex SuperCar Series ===
(key) (Bold – Pole position awarded by qualifying time. Italics – Pole position earned by points standings or practice time. * – Most laps led.)

ARCA Permatex SuperCar Series results
Year	Team	No.	Make	1	2	3	4	5	6	7	8	9	10	11	12	13	14	15	16	17	APSC	Pts	Ref
1985	Bob Johnson Racing	07	Olds	ATL; 4	DAY	ATL	TAL	ATL	SSP	IRP	CSP	FRS	IRP	OEF	ISF	DSF	TOL				106th	-	
1989	Wawak Racing	74	Pontiac	DAY; DNQ	ATL	KIL	TAL	FRS	POC	KIL	HAG	POC	TAL	DEL	FRS	ISF	TOL	DSF	SLM	ATL	NA	-	

=== International Race of Champions ===
(key) (Bold – Pole position. * – Most laps led.)

International Race of Champions results
Year	Make	1	2	3	4	Pos.	Pts	Ref
1997	Pontiac	DAY; 4	CLT; 7	CAL; 4	MCH; 1*	3rd	58	
1998	Pontiac	DAY; 11	CAL; 6	MCH; 9	IND; 4	9th	31	

Sporting positions
Preceded by Johnny Benson	NASCAR Busch Series Champion; 1996, 1997	Succeeded by Dale Earnhardt Jr.
Preceded by Robbie Crouch	NASCAR Coors Tour champion 1985 (last champion under NASCAR sanctioning)	Succeeded by Robbie Crouch
