= Jason Keller =

American racing driver (born 1970)

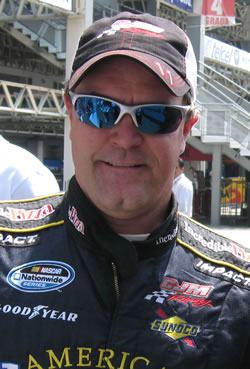
- Keller in 2008
- Born: Jason Scott Keller birth_date = April 23, 1970 (age 56); Greenville, South Carolina, U.S.

NASCAR Cup Series career
- 2 races run over 1 year
- Best finish: 58th (2003)
- First race: 2003 Pontiac Excitement 400 (Richmond)
- Last race: 2003 EA Sports 500 (Talladega)
Wins	Top tens	Poles
0	0	0

NASCAR O'Reilly Auto Parts Series career
- 520 races run over 20 years
- 2010 position: 22nd
- Best finish: 2nd (2000, 2002)
- First race: 1991 Nestle 200 (Lanier)
- Last race: 2010 Ford 300 (Homestead)
- First win: 1995 Kroger 200 (IRP)
- Last win: 2003 GNC Live Well 300 (Milwaukee)
Wins	Top tens	Poles
10	175	11
- Statistics up to date as of December 4, 2011.

Jason Scott Keller (born April 23, 1970) is an American former professional stock car racing driver. Previously, he was a mainstay in NASCAR's second-tier series, competing in 519 Nationwide Series races between 1991 and 2010. On May 15, 2010, Keller made his 500th career start, the first driver in series history to do so.

== Racing career ==
=== Early career ===
Keller was born in Greenville, South Carolina, and began his racing career on kart tracks, moving up to Late-Model Sportsman dirt-track racing at the age of 16. He drove the No. 57 Chevy owned by Jack Finley of Easley, South Carolina.

Keller made his Busch series debut in the 1991 May race at Lanier Speedway. He piloted the No. 54 Air Products Buick to finish in 29th after starting eighth.

Air Products sponsored his family-owned team from 1991 to 1994, during that time using the numbers 54 and 45, before finally settling on the No. 57, a number Keller used until the end of the 2003 season. Keller got his first top-ten finish in his seventh start, at the North Carolina Speedway, in February 1993.

Keller's first top-five came one year later in the fall race of 1994 at Dover Downs. 1994 would be his first full season, and he finished 17th that year in the points. He did miss a race that season, but up to December 1, 2005, Keller has not missed one since. He won three poles in 1994, his first career coming at Rougemont.

In 1995, Keller received backing from Budget Gourmet, and rewarded them by finishing fourth place in the standings. His first career win occurred in August, as he outpaced the field at Indianapolis Raceway Park. In addition, Keller had six top-fives and 12 top-tens that season.

Slim Jim came on board for the 1996 season. Keller secured another top-ten finish in points (sixth) with ten top-tens that season.

Keller would also appear on the October 7, 1996, episode of WCW Nitro in a promo with "Macho Man" Randy Savage, where the two made fun of fellow driver Kyle Petty, who was sponsored by the nWo, for wrecking and gloated about Keller finishing in the top-ten in the same race.

Keller struggled through 1997 and 1998, finishing 13th and 16th in the points respective years. He only had four top-fives and seventeen top-tens in those two years. In 1998, Keller's family owned team had no decals on the car, and that forced the team to sell to the newly formed ppc Racing team.

=== Breakout ===
In 1999, with sponsorship from IGA, Keller won three poles (Spring Bristol, IRP, Richmond spring) and two wins at Bristol Motor Speedway (spring) and IRP. With five top-fives and 12 top-tens, Keller came home eighth in the standings.

In 2000, Keller's ppc team received funding from Excedrin. This began to this date, Keller's best streak in his career. In four years (2000–2003), Keller wrapped up seven wins (one at Dover, two at Nazareth, one at Rockingham, one at Richmond, one at Milwaukee, and one at Talladega.) He won four poles, and finished second twice in the standings (2000 and 2002), third (2001), and fifth (2003).

Keller has run two races in the Cup Series. In 2003, he drove the No. 01 U.S. Army for MB2/MBV Motorsports Pontiac home 32nd in the spring Richmond race, subbing for the Jerry Nadeau, whose suffered a career-ending injury, and 26th in the fall Talladega race in the No. 1 for DEI.

The No. 57 team lost Albertsons sponsorship at the end of 2003, and Miller High Life came on board, changing the team's number to 22. Keller had six top-fives and 12 top-tens in the year, finishing sixth in 2004.

=== Later career ===
In 2005, again without sponsorship, Keller left ppc Racing, and headed towards Team Rensi Motorsports's second operation sponsored by McDonald's. They struggled all year. Despite a ninth place finish in points, Keller was never competitive. He only had one top-five all year (Talladega) and six top-tens. Keller signed with Phoenix Racing for 2006, but was released after just eight races.

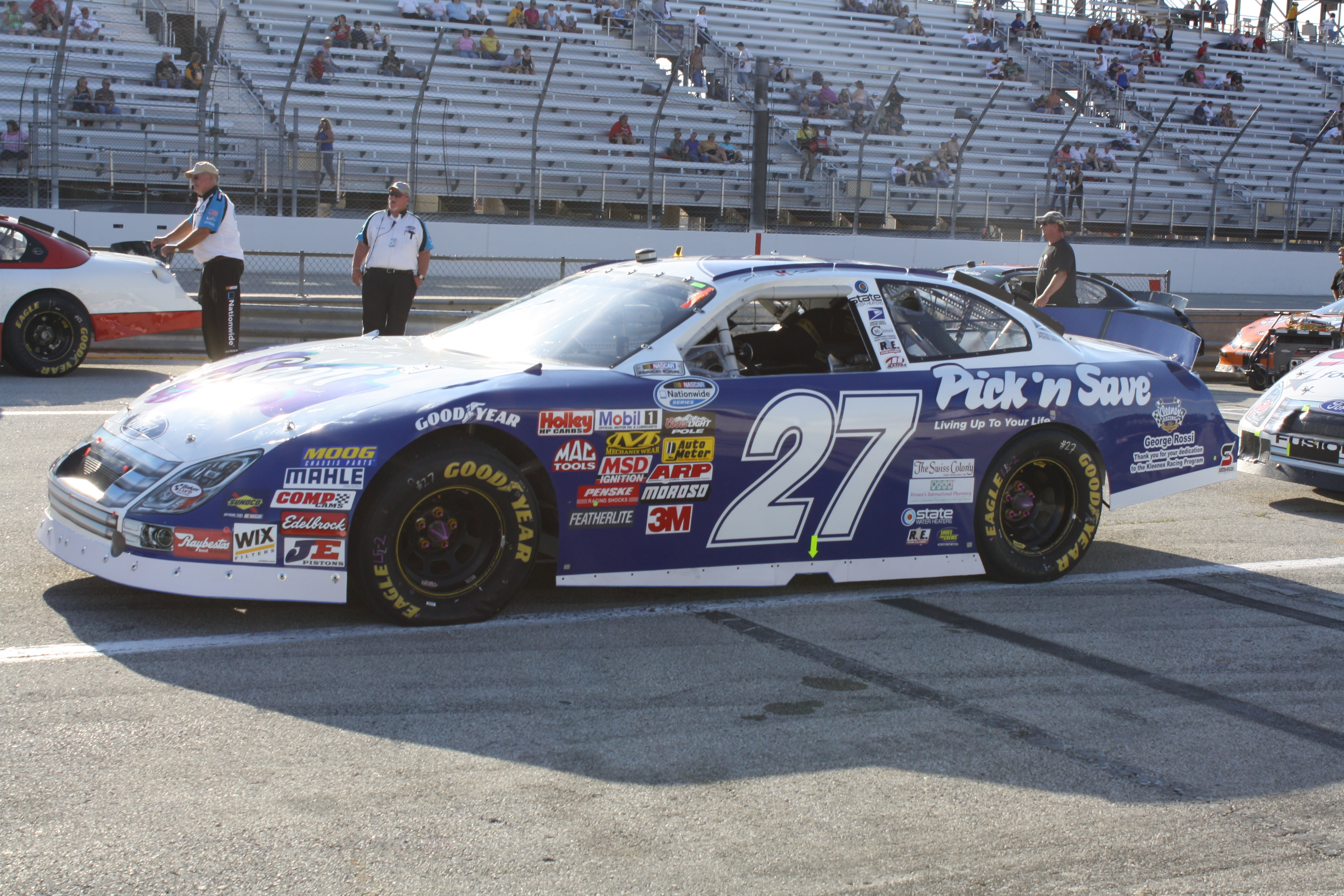
Keller's 2009 No. 27 Nationwide car

Keller was consistent in the first eight races. He ran the No. 1 Miccosukee Dodge to a best finish of 11th at Daytona, but he was running 12th in points after the eighth race of the year. However, on April 18, 2006, Keller was released from the team in what many viewed as a "cheap shot" from Finch. He was replaced by Mike Wallace. Keller would then try to race the No. 34 Frank Cicci Racing Chevy at Richmond, but he did not qualify and declined further rides with the team. Instead, Brewco Motorsports hired Keller to qualify and practice Greg Biffle's No. 66 Ford for select races when Biffle was working on his Nextel Cup Series team. Keller did a good job, and Brewco rewarded Keller with a race at ORP. Keller ran in the top-five for the first half of his four-hundredth career start, but a mid race spin dropped Keller to 15th in the rundown. Keller will drive part-time for Brewco Motorsports, sharing their No. 27 with NEXTEL Cup driver Ward Burton, as well as a part-time schedule for CJM Racing. On October 12, 2007, Keller broke Tommy Houston's record for most career starts in the Busch Series with his 418th appearance. He also holds the record for most Busch Series earnings with over $11M (USD).

In 2008, Keller drove for CJM Racing in their No. 11 Chevrolet in the Nationwide Series full-time with sponsorship from America's Incredible Pizza Company. Keller tested the No. 98 for then-Evernham Motorsports at Daytona Preseason Thunder Testing. Keller was released from CJM Racing in September during the off week after the fall Richmond race and replaced by Scott Lagasse Jr., with AIPC citing that they wanted to take the company in a new direction. He then signed with Baker Curb Racing to drive the No. 27 Ford Fusion through the rest of 2008 and 2009. For 2010, Keller drove for TriStar Motorsports in the No. 35, though the team had to get by with little to no sponsorship. Although he did not qualify for several races early in the season, by mid-year he had raced his way into the top-30 in owner's points, locking him into the remainder of the races. His best finish in 2010 was fourth at Talladega. Keller did not return to the team in 2011, and Mike Bliss took this place in the renumbered No. 19. His 2010 teammate Tony Raines was also replaced by Eric McClure, who brought sponsorship to the team. Keller has not raced in NASCAR since. In November 2011, Kenny Wallace surpassed Keller in the record books when he made his 520th Nationwide Series start, most all-time.

== Motorsports career results ==
=== NASCAR ===
(key) (Bold – Pole position awarded by qualifying time. Italics – Pole position earned by points standings or practice time. * – Most laps led.)

==== Winston Cup Series ====
NASCAR Winston Cup Series results
Year	Team	No.	Make	1	2	3	4	5	6	7	8	9	10	11	12	13	14	15	16	17	18	19	20	21	22	23	24	25	26	27	28	29	30	31	32	33	34	35	36	NWCC	Pts	Ref
1996	David Blair Motorsports	27	Ford	DAY	CAR	RCH	ATL	DAR	BRI	NWS	MAR	TAL	SON	CLT	DOV	POC	MCH	DAY	NHA	POC	TAL	IND; DNQ	GLN	MCH	BRI	DAR	RCH	DOV	MAR	NWS	CLT	CAR	PHO	ATL						NA	-	
2003	MB2 Motorsports	01	Pontiac	DAY	CAR	LVS	ATL	DAR	BRI	TEX	TAL	MAR	CAL	RCH; 32	CLT	DOV	POC	MCH	SON	DAY																				58th	152	
2003	Dale Earnhardt, Inc.	81	Chevy																		CHI; DNQ	NHA	POC	IND	GLN	MCH	BRI	DAR	RCH	NHA	DOV									58th	152	
2003	Dale Earnhardt, Inc.	1	Chevy																													TAL; 26	KAN	CLT	MAR	ATL	PHO	CAR	HOM	58th	152	

==== Nationwide Series ====
NASCAR Nationwide Series results
Year	Team	No.	Make	1	2	3	4	5	6	7	8	9	10	11	12	13	14	15	16	17	18	19	20	21	22	23	24	25	26	27	28	29	30	31	32	33	34	35	NNSC	Pts	Ref
1991	KEL Racing	54	Buick	DAY	RCH	CAR	MAR	VOL	HCY	DAR	BRI	LAN; 29	SBO	NZH	CLT	DOV	ROU	HCY	MYB	GLN	OXF	NHA	SBO	DUB	IRP	ROU	BRI	DAR	RCH	DOV	CLT	NHA	CAR	MAR					104th	76	
1992	KEL Racing	54	Buick	DAY	CAR	RCH	ATL	MAR	DAR	BRI	HCY	LAN; 28	DUB	NZH	CLT	DOV	ROU																						54th	398	
1992	Laughlin Racing	45	Chevy															MYB; 27	GLN	VOL																			54th	398	
1992	Laughlin Racing	45	Olds																		NHA; 13	TAL	IRP	ROU	MCH	NHA; 32	BRI	DAR	RCH	DOV	CLT	MAR	CAR; 39	HCY					54th	398	
1993	KEL Racing	57	Olds	DAY	CAR; 8	RCH; DNQ	DAR; 17	BRI; 20	HCY; 22	ROU	MAR	NZH	CLT; 27	DOV	MYB; 21	GLN	MLW; 13					BRI; 34	DAR; 16	RCH; DNQ	DOV	ROU	CLT; 38	MAR	CAR; DNQ	HCY	ATL; 21								33rd	1137	
1993	KEL Racing	57	Chevy															TAL; 37	IRP	MCH	NHA																		33rd	1137	
1994	KEL Racing	57	Ford	DAY; DNQ																																			17th	2767	
1994	KEL Racing	57	Chevy		CAR; 29	RCH; 10	ATL; 28	MAR; 31	DAR; 36	HCY; 29	BRI; 13	**ROU**; 12	NHA; 27	NZH; 19	CLT; 12	DOV; 8	**MYB**; 11	GLN; 28	MLW; 20	SBO; 14	TAL; 37	HCY; 19	IRP; 9	MCH; 10	BRI; 6	DAR; 15	**RCH**; 36	DOV; 4	CLT; 43	MAR; 10	CAR; 36								17th	2767	
1995	KEL Racing	57	Chevy	DAY; 18	CAR; 29	RCH; 5	ATL; 11	NSV; 21	DAR; 10	BRI; 10	HCY; 4	NHA; 26	NZH; 7	CLT; 6	DOV; 4	MYB; 2*	GLN; 35	MLW; 6	TAL; 33	SBO; 20	IRP; 1	MCH; 20	BRI; 16	DAR; 7	RCH; 22	**DOV**; 15	CLT; 21	CAR; 20	HOM; 3										4th	3211	
1996	KEL Racing	57	Chevy	DAY; 44	CAR; 8	RCH; 7	ATL; 26	NSV; 35	DAR; 16	BRI; 29	HCY; 4	NZH; 5	CLT; 25	DOV; 30	SBO; 21	MYB; 3	GLN; 10	MLW; 10	NHA; 8	TAL; 22	IRP; 25	MCH; 17	BRI; 9	DAR; 27	RCH; 15	DOV; 25	CLT; 10	CAR; 13	HOM; 16										6th	2900	
1997	KEL Racing	57	Chevy	DAY; 37	CAR; 39	RCH; 5	ATL; 24	LVS; 32	DAR; 18	HCY; 7	TEX; 12	BRI; 9	NSV; 16	TAL; 11	NHA; 31	NZH; 7	CLT; 8	DOV; 13	SBO; 7	GLN; 14	MLW; 17	MYB; 29	GTY; 2	IRP; 10	MCH; 21	BRI; 29	DAR; 37	RCH; 7	DOV; 13	CLT; 21	CAL; 17	CAR; 18	HOM; 35						13th	3242	
1998	Progressive Motorsports	57	Chevy	DAY; 16	CAR; 10	LVS; 33	NSV; 5	DAR; 33	BRI; 5	TEX; 26	HCY; 10	TAL; 11	NHA; 12	NZH; 7	CLT; 38	DOV; 9	RCH; 6	PPR; 33	GLN; 10	MLW; 36	MYB; 33	CAL; 27	SBO; 33	IRP; 16	MCH; 28	BRI; 38	DAR; 41	RCH; 20	DOV; 20	CLT; 33	GTY; 37	CAR; 22	ATL; 22	HOM; 35					16th	2971	
1999	Progressive Motorsports	57	Chevy	DAY; 22	CAR; 33	LVS; 10	ATL; 15	DAR; 12	TEX; 6	NSV; 3	**BRI**; 1*	TAL; 40	CAL; 29	NHA; 6	**RCH**; 30	NZH; 16	CLT; 11	DOV; 10	SBO; 28	GLN; 5	MLW; 36	MYB; 8	PPR; 33	GTY; 5	**IRP**; 1*	MCH; 27	BRI; 21	DAR; 23	RCH; 10	DOV; 28	CLT; 29	CAR; 8	MEM; 29	PHO; 40	HOM; 26				8th	3537	
2000	ppc Racing	57	Chevy	DAY; 12	CAR; 4	LVS; 34	ATL; 43	DAR; 14	BRI; 9	TEX; 11	NSV; 22	TAL; 22	CAL; 7	RCH; 5	NHA; 3	CLT; 19	DOV; 1	SBO; 7	MYB; 4	GLN; 11	MLW; 5	NZH; 3	PPR; 12	GTY; 4	IRP; 5	MCH; 23	BRI; 2	DAR; 6	RCH; 11	DOV; 2	CLT; 6	CAR; 3	MEM; 15	PHO; 8	HOM; 4				2nd	4389	
2001	ppc Racing	57	Ford	DAY; 7	CAR; 10	LVS; 3	ATL; 7	DAR; 3	BRI; 11	TEX; 24	NSH; 2	TAL; 25	CAL; 15	RCH; 18	NHA; 1	NZH; 4	CLT; 3	DOV; 13	KEN; 14	MLW; 5	GLN; 9	CHI; 5	GTY; 2	PPR; 4	IRP; 5	MCH; 8	BRI; 29	DAR; 6	RCH; 13	DOV; 25	KAN; 5	CLT; 2	MEM; 7	PHO; 6	CAR; 4	HOM; 19			3rd	4642	
2002	ppc Racing	57	Ford	DAY; 4	CAR; 1	LVS; 22	DAR; 4	BRI; 29	TEX; 13	NSH; 5*	TAL; 1*	CAL; 5	RCH; 1	NHA; 32	NZH; 1*	CLT; 13	DOV; 28	NSH; 5	KEN; 34	MLW; 2	DAY; 4	CHI; 10	GTY; 6	**PPR**; 3	IRP; 2	MCH; 35	**BRI**; 9	DAR; 2	RCH; 5	DOV; 5	KAN; 30	CLT; 18	MEM; 10	ATL; 7	CAR; 27	PHO; 4	HOM; 15*		2nd	4644	
2003	ppc Racing	57	Ford	DAY; 27	CAR; 5	LVS; 5	DAR; 10	BRI; 3	**TEX**; 18	TAL; 28	NSH; 27	CAL; 7	RCH; 21	GTY; 3	NZH; 11	CLT; 17	DOV; 11	NSH; 14	KEN; 2	MLW; 1	DAY; 14	CHI; 6	NHA; 7	PPR; 2	IRP; 2	MCH; 23	**BRI**; 11	DAR; 7	RCH; 21	DOV; 8	KAN; 4	CLT; 10	MEM; 2	ATL; 15	PHO; 17	CAR; 13	HOM; 24		5th	4528	
2004	ppc Racing	22	Ford	DAY; 9	CAR; 12	LVS; 8	DAR; 13	BRI; 8	TEX; 12	NSH; 13	TAL; 12	CAL; 19	GTY; 3	RCH; 5	NZH; 4	CLT; 31	DOV; 13	NSH; 33	KEN; 5	MLW; 3	DAY; 18	CHI; 2	NHA; 26	PPR; 13	IRP; 19	MCH; 16	BRI; 8	CAL; 22	RCH; 39	DOV; 12	KAN; 7	CLT; 30	MEM; 6	ATL; 35	PHO; 29	DAR; 16	HOM; 13		6th	4088	
2005	Team Rensi Motorsports	35	Ford	DAY; 35	CAL; 17	MXC; 13	LVS; 43	ATL; 17	NSH; 8	BRI; 19	TEX; 13	PHO; 21	TAL; 8	DAR; 13	RCH; 11	CLT; 23	DOV; 7	NSH; 11	KEN; 31	MLW; 13	DAY; 17	CHI; 22	NHA; 21	PPR; 36	GTY; 33	IRP; 4	GLN; 18	MCH; 15	BRI; 12	CAL; 6	RCH; 38	DOV; 13	KAN; 18	CLT; 18	MEM; 10	TEX; 13	PHO; 16	HOM; 15	9th	3866	
2006	Phoenix Racing	1	Dodge	DAY; 11	CAL; 15	MXC; 22	LVS; 16	ATL; 23	BRI; 15	TEX; 28	NSH; 16	PHO	TAL																										41st	1116	
2006	Frank Cicci Racing	34	Chevy											RCH; DNQ	DAR	CLT	DOV	NSH	KEN	MLW	DAY	CHI	NHA	MAR	GTY														41st	1116	
2006	Brewco Motorsports	66	Ford																							IRP; 15	GLN	MCH	BRI	CAL	RCH	DOV	KAN	CLT	MEM; 12	TEX	PHO	HOM	41st	1116	
2007	Brewco Motorsports	27	Ford	DAY	CAL	MXC	LVS	ATL	BRI	NSH; 33	TEX	PHO	TAL	RCH					KEN; 20	MLW; 5				GTY; 30	IRP; 11	CGV	GLN												26th	2206	
2007	CJM Racing	11	Chevy												DAR; 14	CLT	DOV; 13	NSH; 6			NHA; 26	DAY	CHI; 35					MCH; 22	BRI; 24		RCH; 10	DOV; 8	KAN; 16	CLT; 34	MEM; 8	TEX; 22	PHO; 35	HOM; 28	26th	2206	
2007	Baker Curb Racing	27	Ford																											CAL; 17									26th	2206	
2008	CJM Racing	11	Chevy	DAY; 36	CAL; 14	LVS; 18	ATL; 14	BRI; 15	NSH; 18	TEX; 12	PHO; 32	MXC; 17	TAL; 21	RCH; 19	DAR; 7	CLT; 17	DOV; 16	NSH; 15	KEN; 10	MLW; 9	NHA; 11	DAY; 18	CHI; 14	GTY; 3	IRP; 24	CGV; 23	GLN; 32	MCH; 17	BRI; 12	CAL; 14	RCH; 16								12th	3873	
2008	Baker Curb Racing	27	Ford																													DOV; 19	KAN; 19	CLT; 29	MEM; 25	TEX; 19	PHO; 13	HOM; 22	12th	3873	
2009	Baker Curb Racing	27	Ford	DAY; 9	CAL; 17	LVS; 25	BRI; 28	TEX; 15	NSH; 12	PHO; 17	TAL; 7	RCH; 9	DAR; 15	CLT; 16	DOV; 9	NSH; 26	KEN; 23	MLW; 20	NHA; 23	DAY; 22	CHI; 19	GTY; 9	IRP; 25	IOW; 6	GLN; 16	MCH; 20	BRI; 16	CGV; 23	ATL; 37	RCH; 15	DOV; 10	KAN; 13	CAL; 10	CLT; 17	MEM; 28	TEX; 12	PHO; 11	HOM; 13	8th	3960	
2010	Tri-Star Motorsports	35	Chevy	DAY; DNQ	CAL; 20	LVS; DNQ	BRI; 27	NSH; 38	PHO; 22	TEX; DNQ	TAL; 4	RCH; 14	DAR; 21	DOV; 33	CLT; 19	NSH; 20	KEN; 23	ROA	NHA; 15	DAY; 20	CHI; 30	GTY; 34	IRP; 32	IOW; 26	GLN	MCH; 23	BRI; 12	CGV	ATL; 18	RCH; 23	DOV; 27	KAN; 27	CAL; 16	CLT; 32	GTY	TEX; 29	PHO	HOM; 27	22nd	2514	
