= 1996 NASCAR Busch Series =

American motorsport season

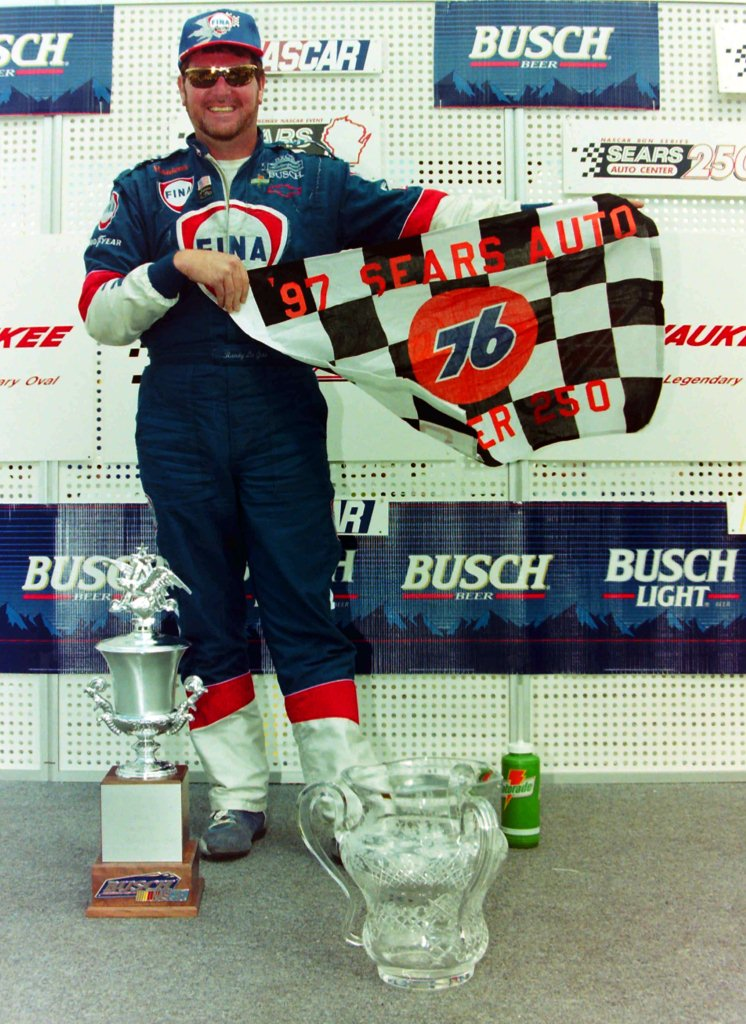
Randy LaJoie, the 1996 Busch Series champion

The 1996 NASCAR Busch Series began February 17 and ended November 3. Randy LaJoie of BACE Motorsports was crowned the series champion.

== Teams and drivers ==
List of full-time teams at the start of 1996.

Team	Car(s)	No.	Driver(s)	Listed owner(s)
Akins-Sutton Motorsports	Ford Thunderbird	38	Dennis Setzer	Bob Sutton
American Equipment Racing	Chevrolet Monte Carlo	95	David Green	Buz McCall
BACE Motorsports	Chevrolet Monte Carlo	74	Randy LaJoie	Bill Baumgardner
Beverley Racing	Chevrolet Monte Carlo	25	Johnny Rumley	Don Beverley
Bown Racing	Chevrolet Monte Carlo	51	Jim Bown	Dick Bown
Buckshot Racing	Ford Thunderbird	00	Buckshot Jones	Billy Jones
Champion Racing	Ford Thunderbird	26	Derrike Cope	Leon Fox
Curb Racing	Ford Thunderbird	96	Stevie Reeves	Mike Curb
Dale Earnhardt, Inc.	Chevrolet Monte Carlo	3	Jeff Green	Dale Earnhardt
Diamond Ridge Motorsports	Chevrolet Monte Carlo	29	Steve Grissom	Gary Bechtel
Ridling Motorsports	Chevrolet Monte Carlo	88	Pete Orr (R)	David Ridling
Henderson Brothers Racing	Ford Thunderbird	75	Doug Heveron	Charlie Henderson
Hensley Motorsports	Chevrolet Monte Carlo	63	Curtis Markham	Hubert Hensley
Isenhower Brothers Racing	Ford Thunderbird	32	Dale Jarrett	Horace Isenhower
J&J Racing	Chevrolet Monte Carlo	99	Glenn Allen Jr. (R)	Bill Papke
Joe Bessey Motorsports	Chevrolet Monte Carlo	9	Joe Bessey	Nancy Bessey
KEL Racing	Chevrolet Monte Carlo	57	Jason Keller	Joe Keller]
Labonte Motorsports	Chevrolet Monte Carlo	5	Terry Labonte	
Labonte Motorsports	Chevrolet Monte Carlo	44	Bobby Labonte	
Lepage Racing	Chevrolet Monte Carlo	71	Kevin Lepage	Kevin Lepage
Mark Rypien Motorsports	Pontiac Grand Prix	23	Chad Little	Mark Rypien
Martin Racing	Chevrolet Monte Carlo	92	Larry Pearson	Mac Martin
Michael Waltrip Racing	Ford Thunderbird	12	Michael Waltrip	Buffy Waltrip
MS Racing	Ford Thunderbird	14	Patty Moise	Elton Sawyer
NorthStar Motorsports	Ford Thunderbird	98	Jeremy Mayfield	Meredith Ruark
Owen Racing	Ford Thunderbird	90	Mike Wallace	Barry Owen
Parker Racing	Chevrolet Monte Carlo	72	Mike Dillon	Ron Parker
Petty Enterprises	Chevrolet Monte Carlo 20; Pontiac Grand Prix 6	43	Rodney Combs	Richard Petty
Phil Parsons Racing	Chevrolet Monte Carlo	10	Phil Parsons	Marcia Parsons
Phoenix Racing	Chevrolet Monte Carlo	4	Jeff Purvis	James Finch
Porter Racing	Ford Thunderbird	48	Randy Porter	James Porter
Pro Tech Motorsports	Chevrolet Monte Carlo	81	Todd Bodine	Ron Neal
Roush Racing	Ford Thunderbird	60	Mark Martin	Jack Roush
Sadler Racing	Chevrolet Monte Carlo	1	Hermie Sadler	Bell Sadler
Shoemaker Racing	Chevrolet Monte Carlo	64	Dick Trickle	Dennis Shoemaker
ST Motorsports	Chevrolet Monte Carlo	47	Jeff Fuller	Tad Geschickter
Stegall Motorsports	Chevrolet Monte Carlo	85	Shane Hall (R)	Don Stegall
Taylor Motorsports	Chevrolet Monte Carlo	40	Tim Fedewa	Doug Taylor
Team 34	Chevrolet Monte Carlo	34	Mike McLaughlin	Frank Cicci

== Races ==
=== Goody's Headache Powder 300 ===
The Goody's Headache Powder 300 was held February 17 at Daytona International Speedway. Jeff Purvis won the pole.

Top ten results

1. 29–Steve Grissom
2. 32–Dale Jarrett
3. 60–Mark Martin
4. 92–Larry Pearson
5. 63–Curtis Markham
6. 43–Rodney Combs
7. 74–Randy LaJoie
8. 26–Derrike Cope
9. 44–Bobby Labonte
10. 20–Jimmy Spencer
- This was the first NASCAR start for Tony Stewart.

=== Goodwrench Service 200 ===
The Goodwrench Service 200 was held February 24 at North Carolina Speedway. Mark Martin won the pole.

Top ten results

1. 60–Mark Martin
2. 34–Mike McLaughlin
3. 4–Jeff Purvis
4. 2–Ricky Craven
5. 44–Bobby Labonte
6. 95–David Green
7. 74–Randy LaJoie
8. 57–Jason Keller
9. 5–Terry Labonte
10. 81–Todd Bodine

=== Hardee's Fried Chicken Challenge 250 ===
The Hardee's Fried Chicken Challenge 250 was Held March 2 at Richmond International Raceway. Jeff Purvis won the pole.

Top ten results

1. 4–Jeff Purvis
2. 87–Joe Nemechek
3. 95–David Green
4. 90–Mike Wallace
5. 63–Curtis Markham
6. 74–Randy LaJoie
7. 57–Jason Keller
8. 81–Todd Bodine
9. 32–Dale Jarrett
10. 5–Terry Labonte

=== Busch Light 300 ===
The Busch Light 300 was held March 9 at Atlanta Motor Speedway. Dick Trickle won the pole.

Top ten results

1. 5–Terry Labonte
2. 95–David Green
3. 10–Phil Parsons
4. 29–Steve Grissom
5. 49–Stanton Barrett
6. 43–Rodney Combs
7. 60–Mark Martin
8. 22–Ward Burton
9. 44–Bobby Labonte
10. 87–Joe Nemechek

=== BellSouth/Opryland USA 320 ===
The BellSouth/Opryland USA 320 was held March 17 at Nashville Speedway USA. Sterling Marlin won the pole.

Top ten results

1. 44–Bobby Labonte
2. 95–David Green
3. 10–Phil Parsons
4. 5–Terry Labonte
5. 63–Curtis Markham
6. 87–Joe Nemechek
7. 99–Glenn Allen Jr.
8. 64–Dick Trickle
9. 98–Jeremy Mayfield
10. 55–Bobby Dotter

=== Dura Lube 200 (March 23) ===
The Dura Lube 200 was held March 23 at Darlington Raceway. Jeff Green won the pole.

Top ten results

1. 60–Mark Martin
2. 12–Michael Waltrip
3. 5–Terry Labonte
4. 2–Ricky Craven
5. 44–Bobby Labonte
6. 32–Dale Jarrett
7. 29–Steve Grissom
8. 81–Todd Bodine
9. 64–Dick Trickle
10. 22–Ward Burton

=== Goody's Headache Powder 250 ===
The Goody's Headache Powder 250 was held March 30 at Bristol Motor Speedway. Chad Little won the pole.

Top ten results

1. 60–Mark Martin
2. 3–Jeff Green
3. 8–Kenny Wallace
4. 10–Phil Parsons
5. 29–Steve Grissom
6. 74–Randy LaJoie
7. 95–David Green
8. 64–Dick Trickle
9. 90–Mike Wallace
10. 47–Jeff Fuller

=== Sundrop 300 ===
The Sundrop 300 was held April 6 at Hickory Motor Speedway. David Green won the pole.

Top ten results

1. 95–David Green
2. 1–Hermie Sadler
3. 74–Randy LaJoie
4. 57–Jason Keller
5. 81–Todd Bodine
6. 51–Jimmy Spencer
7. 3–Jeff Green
8. 88–Kevin Lepage
9. 63–Curtis Markham
10. 92–Larry Pearson

=== CoreStates/Meridian Advantage 200 ===
The CoreStates/Meridian Advantage 200 was held May 19 at Nazareth Speedway. David Green won the pole.

Top ten results

1. 74–Randy LaJoie*
2. 95–David Green
3. 3–Jeff Green
4. 64–Dick Trickle
5. 57–Jason Keller
6. 6–Tommy Houston
7. 88–Kevin Lepage
8. 40–Tim Fedewa
9. 81–Todd Bodine
10. 99–Glenn Allen Jr.

Shane Hall flipped in this race.

- This was the first win for Randy LaJoie.
- Toshio Suzuki became the first Japanese driver to qualify for a NASCAR race.

=== Red Dog 300 ===
The Red Dog 300 was held May 25 at Charlotte Motor Speedway. Dale Jarrett won the pole. Future Cup Series champion Matt Kenseth made his debut.

Top ten results

1. 60–Mark Martin
2. 64–Dick Trickle
3. 44–Bobby Labonte
4. 5–Terry Labonte
5. 74–Randy LaJoie
6. 32–Dale Jarrett
7. 26–Derrike Cope
8. 87–Joe Nemechek
9. 90–Mike Wallace
10. 22–Ward Burton

=== GM Goodwrench/Delco 200 ===
The GM Goodwrench/Delco 200 was held June 1 at Dover International Speedway. Bobby Labonte won the pole.

Top ten results

1. 74–Randy LaJoie
2. 2–Ricky Craven
3. 5–Terry Labonte
4. 95–David Green
5. 90–Mike Wallace
6. 32–Dale Jarrett
7. 3–Jeff Green
8. 10–Phil Parsons
9. 92–Larry Pearson
10. 1–Hermie Sadler

=== Winston Motorsports 300 ===
The Winston Motorsports 300 was held June 8 at South Boston Speedway. Randy LaJoie won the pole. Mike Harmon would make his NASCAR debut in this race

Top ten results

1. 81–Todd Bodine
2. 34–Mike McLaughlin
3. 3–Jeff Green
4. 92–Larry Pearson
5. 74–Randy LaJoie
6. 63–Curtis Markham
7. 1–Hermie Sadler
8. 23–Chad Little
9. 88–Kevin Lepage
10. 72–Mike Dillon

=== Carolina Pride / Advance Auto Parts 250 ===
The Carolina Pride / Advance Auto Parts 250 was held June 22 at Myrtle Beach Speedway. David Green won the pole. This race marked the NASCAR debut of Dale Earnhardt Jr., driving the #31 Chevrolet. Earnhardt started 7th and finished 14th.

Top ten results

1. 95–David Green
2. 4–Jeff Purvis
3. 57–Jason Keller
4. 88–Kevin Lepage
5. 3–Jeff Green
6. 34–Mike McLaughlin
7. 64–Dick Trickle
8. 43–Dennis Setzer
9. 63–Curtis Markham
10. 37–Mark Green

=== Lysol 200 ===
The Lysol 200 was held June 30 at Watkins Glen International. David Green won the pole.

Top ten results

1. 5–Terry Labonte
2. 81–Todd Bodine
3. 34–Mike McLaughlin
4. 44–Bobby Labonte
5. 95–David Green
6. 3–Jeff Green
7. 20–Jimmy Spencer
8. 23–Chad Little
9. 8–Kenny Wallace
10. 57–Jason Keller

=== Sears Auto Center 250 ===
The Sears Auto Center 250 was held July 7 at The Milwaukee Mile. Hermie Sadler won the pole.

Top ten results

1. 00–Buckshot Jones
2. 34–Mike McLaughlin
3. 74–Randy LaJoie
4. 8–Kenny Wallace
5. 44–Bobby Labonte
6. 75–Doug Heveron
7. 3–Jeff Green
8. 6–Tommy Houston
9. 47–Jeff Fuller
10. 57–Jason Keller
- This was Buckshot Jones's first Busch Series win.

=== Stanley 200 ===
The Stanley 200 was held July 12 at New Hampshire International Speedway. The race was originally scheduled to run on May 12, but was rescheduled for July 12 (Friday morning) because of rain. The field was set according to where they qualified on May 11. David Green won the pole.

Top ten results

1. 74–Randy LaJoie
2. 5–Terry Labonte
3. 95–David Green
4. 3–Jeff Green
5. 44–Bobby Labonte
6. 1–Hermie Sadler
7. 81–Todd Bodine
8. 57–Jason Keller
9. 34–Mike McLaughlin
10. 90–Mike Wallace

=== Humminbird Fishfinder 500K ===
The Humminbird Fishfinder 500K was held July 27 at Talladega Superspeedway. Joe Nemechek won the pole.

Top ten results

1. 29–Greg Sacks
2. 87–Joe Nemechek
3. 74–Randy LaJoie
4. 5–Terry Labonte
5. 12–Michael Waltrip
6. 4–Jeff Purvis
7. 64–Dick Trickle
8. 47–Jeff Fuller
9. 88–Kevin Lepage
10. 95–David Green

=== Kroger 200 ===
The Kroger 200 was held August 2 at Indianapolis Raceway Park. Randy LaJoie won the pole.

Top ten results

1. 74–Randy LaJoie
2. 34–Mike McLaughlin
3. 95–David Green
4. 40–Tim Fedewa
5. 32–Dale Jarrett
6. 43–Dennis Setzer
7. 4–Jeff Purvis
8. 64–Dick Trickle
9. 00–Buckshot Jones
10. 11–Tracy Leslie

=== Detroit Gasket 200 ===
The Detroit Gasket 200 was held August 17 at Michigan International Speedway. Ricky Craven won the pole.

Top ten results

1. 4–Jeff Purvis
2. 88–Kevin Lepage
3. 5–Terry Labonte
4. 60–Mark Martin
5. 2–Ricky Craven
6. 44–Bobby Labonte
7. 95–David Green
8. 28–Hut Stricklin
9. 29–Elliott Sadler
10. 74–Randy LaJoie

=== Food City 250 ===
The Food City 250 was held August 23 at Bristol Motor Speedway. Jeff Fuller won the pole.

Top ten results

1. 47–Jeff Fuller
2. 32–Dale Jarrett
3. 10–Phil Parsons
4. 20–Jimmy Spencer
5. 12–Michael Waltrip
6. 26–Derrike Cope
7. 63–Curtis Markham
8. 3–Jeff Green
9. 57–Jason Keller
10. 5–Terry Labonte
- This was Jeff Fuller's first (and only) Busch Series win.

=== Dura Lube 200 (August 31) ===
The Dura Lube 200 was held August 31 at Darlington Raceway. Mark Martin won the pole.

Top ten results

1. 5–Terry Labonte
2. 60–Mark Martin
3. 64–Dick Trickle
4. 95–David Green
5. 74–Randy LaJoie
6. 2–Ricky Craven
7. 3–Jeff Green
8. 32–Dale Jarrett
9. 88–Kevin Lepage
10. 6–Tommy Houston

=== Autolite Platinum 250 ===
The Autolite Platinum 250 was held September 8 at Richmond International Raceway. Michael Waltrip won the pole.

Top ten results

1. 8–Kenny Wallace
2. 95–David Green
3. 23–Chad Little
4. 60–Mark Martin
5. 64–Dick Trickle
6. 4–Jeff Purvis
7. 98–Jeremy Mayfield
8. 74–Randy LaJoie
9. 44–Bobby Labonte
10. 5–Terry Labonte

=== MBNA 200 ===
The MBNA 200 was held September 14 at Dover International Speedway. Ricky Craven won the pole.

Top ten results

1. 74–Randy LaJoie
2. 32–Dale Jarrett
3. 10–Phil Parsons
4. 5–Terry Labonte
5. 2–Ricky Craven
6. 34–Mike McLaughlin
7. 29–Elliott Sadler
8. 38–Elton Sawyer
9. 23–Chad Little
10. 1–Hermie Sadler

=== All Pro Bumper to Bumper 300 ===
The All Pro Bumper to Bumper 300 was held October 5 at Charlotte Motor Speedway. Bobby Labonte won the pole.

Top ten results

1. 60–Mark Martin
2. 44–Bobby Labonte
3. 92–Sterling Marlin
4. 23–Chad Little
5. 34–Mike McLaughlin
6. 74–Randy LaJoie
7. 88–Kevin Lepage
8. 3–Jeff Green
9. 20–Jimmy Spencer
10. 57–Jason Keller
- Steve Park made his series debut in his race, driving the No. 31 Chevrolet for Dale Earnhardt Inc. Park qualified 13th, but crashed out of the race on lap 117 and posted a 29th place finish.

=== AC-Delco 200 ===
The AC-Delco 200 was held October 19 at North Carolina Speedway. Buckshot Jones won the pole.

Top ten results

1. 60–Mark Martin
2. 32–Dale Jarrett
3. 2–Ricky Craven
4. 34–Mike McLaughlin
5. 95–David Green
6. 5–Terry Labonte
7. 88–Kevin Lepage
8. 3–Jeff Green
9. 74–Randy LaJoie
10. 23–Chad Little

=== Jiffy Lube Miami 300 ===
The Jiffy Lube Miami 300 was held November 3 at Homestead-Miami Speedway. Bobby Labonte won the pole.

Top ten results

1. 88–Kevin Lepage
2. 44–Bobby Labonte
3. 60–Mark Martin
4. 87–Joe Nemechek
5. 29–Elliott Sadler
6. 20–Jimmy Spencer
7. 23–Chad Little
8. 81–Todd Bodine
9. 95–David Green
10. 74–Randy LaJoie
- This was Kevin Lepage's first career victory.

== Full Drivers' Championship ==
(key) Bold – Pole position awarded by time. Italics – Pole position set by owner's points. * – Most laps led.

Pos	Driver	DAY	CAR	RCH	ATL	NSV	DAR	BRI	HCY	NAZ	CLT	DOV	SBO	MYB	GLN	MLW	NHA	TAL	IRP	MCH	BRI	DAR	RCH	DOV	CLT	CAR	HOM	Pts
1	Randy LaJoie	7	7	6	28	21	12	6	3	1*	5*	1	**5***	18	30	3	1*	3	**1***	10	29	5	8	1*	6	9	10	3714
2	David Green	12	6	3	2	2	14	7	**1***	**2**	19	4	20	**1***	**5**	32	3	10	3	7	11	4	2	18	40	5	9	3685
3	Todd Bodine	34	10	8	18	23	8	17	5	9	14	18	1	12	2	31*	7	23	35	24	34	14	19	11	14	11	8	3064
4	Jeff Green	25	20	37	32	40	**11**	2	7	3	43	7	3	5	6	7	4	14	36	18	8	7	27	29	8	8	13	3059
5	Chad Little	19	33	20	15	15	37	**12**	11	11	13	29	8	16	8	21	32	21	27	11	25	12	3	9	4	10	7	2984
6	Jason Keller	44	8	7	26	35	16	29	4	5	25	30	21	3	10	10	8	22	25	17	9	27	15	25	10	13	16	2900
7	Jeff Purvis	**23**	3	**1**	29	34	30	14	16	13	22	16	25	2	25	37	20	6	7	1	14	23	6	37	13	32	25	2894
8	Kevin Lepage	45	19	32	42	18	29	23	8	7	28	14	9	4	28	12	19	9	12	2	28	9	34	31	7	7	1*	2870
9	Phil Parsons	24	14	29	3	3	22	4	20	12	15	8	15	17	13	30	40	38	23	14	3	41	30	3	18	29	12	2854
10	Mike McLaughlin	31	2	38	11	30	41*	27	25	29	35	32	2	6	3	2	9	25	2	13	38	38	11	6	5	4	27	2853
11	Curtis Markham	5	17	5	27	5	19	20	9	15	30	20	6	9	27	11	15	20	26	28	7	25	20	36	24	24	28	2838
12	Dick Trickle				**13**	8	9	8	27	4	2	40	14	7	12	15	12	7	8	37	23	3	5	30	25	16	35	2728
13	Terry Labonte	39	9	10	1	4	3				4	3			1		2	4		3	10	1*	10	4	15	6		2699
14	Glenn Allen Jr. **(R)**	33	16	12	17	7	15	11	15	10	27	36	19	19	26	38	28	17	16	23	17	35	14	22	42	17	18	2593
15	Hermie Sadler	32	18	41	21	14	40	13	2	30	24	10	7	25	31	**27**	6	31	18	15	27	11	12	10	31	40	22	2588
16	Larry Pearson	4	34	26	23	11	23	22	10	16	20	9	4	28	34	29	11	34	13	33	30	37	32	27	22	27	37	2471
17	Jeff Fuller	35	DNQ	24	38	24	25	10	14	42	16	27	12	15	33	9	22	8	20	26	**1***	15	24	20	DNQ	20	33	2399
18	Rodney Combs	6	39	11	6	19	34	28	21	17	26	11	24	22	21	28	27	35	28	20	22	17	17	12	DNQ	34	38	2396
19	Bobby Labonte	9	5	17	9	1	5				3	**15***			4	5	5	16		6			9		**2**		**2**	2374
20	Tim Fedewa	DNQ	25	27	22	25	28	26	12	8	17	39	16	20	18	26	38	15	4	40	21	42	41	21	17	19	23	2320
21	Mark Martin	3	**1***	35*	7*		1	1*			1							27		4*		**2**	4		1*	1*	3	2186
22	Dale Jarrett	2	38	9	DNQ		6	15			**6**	6				41		32	5	21	2	8	DNQ	2	32	2	20	2109
23	Mike Dillon **(R)**	15	32	23	14	20	26	DNQ	26	25	DNQ	38	10	21	19	33	23	29	21	35		22	18	28	DNQ	15	DNQ	1945
24	Bobby Dotter	14	DNQ	DNQ	DNQ	10	24	18	13	18	18	12	17	33		17	14	19	31	39	18	43	29	35				1832
25	Buckshot Jones	DNQ	37	19	DNQ	DNQ	DNQ	DNQ	18	24	DNQ	21	23	13	29	1	21	DNQ	9	27	24	34	33	19	27	**37**	DNQ	1708
26	Mike Wallace	DNQ	13	4	31	33	13	9			9	5				39	10	41	11		35	31	DNQ	24	26	42	DNQ	1664
27	Dennis Setzer	27	31	22	DNQ	37	36	DNQ	DNQ	20	DNQ	33	11	8	11	24	24	DNQ	6			40		15	DNQ	18	41	1567
28	Tommy Houston	DNQ	DNQ	DNQ	35	31	DNQ	33	31	6	DNQ	37	27	11	22	8	16	DNQ	30	31	DNQ	10	39	33	21	39	DNQ	1563
29	Ricky Craven		4				4					2*			16					**5**	31	6		**5***	20	3	21	1503
30	Doug Heveron	46	27	14	DNQ	13	20	DNQ	24	22	37	25	13	26	20	6	17	36		29	DNQ	DNQ						1488
31	Patty Moise	DNQ	35	21			38	25		32	32	22		24	17	36	36	18	29	30	20	33	DNQ	16	DNQ	28	DNQ	1458
32	Jimmy Spencer	10						31	6		40				7			11		42	4	24	21	40	9		6	1392
33	Jim Bown	29	29	28	DNQ	16	35			35	41			34	24	13	34	30			26	21	26	26	28			1346
34	Michael Waltrip	41	11	25	DNQ	29	2	19			11				14		Wth	5		38	5		**38**		30			1342
35	Elliott Sadler			13					30	40			32				18		19	9	13	32	23	7	DNQ	36	5	1301
36	Stevie Reeves	DNQ	15	DNQ	DNQ	32	33	DNQ			23	19			23	20		33	34	34	33	18	35	17	16	DNQ	DNQ	1290
37	Randy Porter	DNQ	42	33	DNQ	26	DNQ	30	28	27	DNQ	28	26	30	37	25	37	DNQ	DNQ	DNQ	15		25	23	DNQ	38	26	1283
38	Joe Nemechek	37		2	10	6	DNQ				8				32*		35	**2***				13			36		4	1282
39	Elton Sawyer			QL	33	12			17											25	12	16	22	8	19	14	15	1217
40	Derrike Cope	8	21		12		18	21			7							42			6	29			37	12	43	1200
41	Kenny Wallace	DNQ				28*		3			DNQ	13			9	4	30	37		22			1*				14	1189
42	Shane Hall **(R)**		12	15	DNQ	DNQ	31	35	DNQ	38	DNQ		18	29		14	29				16		DNQ	34	39	30	29	1175
43	Jeremy Mayfield	26	30		41	9	42				34				35			13			32		7		43	35	11	1051
44	Joe Bessey	11	28	18	43	17	27	36	19		33						13	39	DNQ							26	DNQ	1023
45	Steve Grissom	1*	24	16	4		7	5			21	35																1005
46	Mark Green **(R)**		36	DNQ		38			DNQ	19			28	10		19			14				13		DNQ	21	30	947
47	Ward Burton	DNQ			8		10				10									12		19	16	14	41	DNQ		919
48	Hut Stricklin	30			19			24			12	31						12		8		36						791
49	Tony Stewart **(R)**	21	DNQ		39			16			Wth	17		DNQ		22		26	DNQ		37	20	40					753
50	Tracy Leslie	36			34		DNQ	DNQ			39							28	10	19					35		19	645
51	Chuck Bown	28		31	DNQ	27	21	37	23			26							32									629
52	Johnny Rumley	16	26	30	24	36	17	DNQ	DNQ								QL								DNQ	DNQ		531
53	Ron Barfield Jr.										DNQ	23						DNQ		DNQ		28	37	13	11	41		519
54	Nathan Buttke		40	DNQ			39		29		DNQ		29	27		35	Wth		17									493
55	Johnny Chapman	13	22	40	20				22		DNQ																	464
56	Mike Harmon **(R)**	DNQ	DNQ	DNQ	DNQ	DNQ	DNQ	DNQ					31	23		42		40	33	32			28					454
57	Greg Sacks																	1								25	31	338
58	L. W. Miller	DNQ			16						29	41								36		39			DNQ			332
59	Jeff McClure		DNQ							26	DNQ			31		16												270
60	Sterling Marlin					**22**																			3			262
61	Dale Fischlein	DNQ			30						DNQ					23		24									DNQ	258
62	Brad Teague							32													19	30						246
63	Marty Ward			DNQ	DNQ						36			32					15						DNQ			240
64	Stanton Barrett				5		32				DNQ																	222
65	Pete Orr	40	DNQ	34	36	DNQ	DNQ	34																				220
66	Mike Laughlin Jr.		DNQ	36	DNQ		DNQ	DNQ		37	DNQ	DNQ				40	31		DNQ								DNQ	220
67	Greg Clark	DNQ	DNQ	DNQ	25		DNQ				DNQ						33						DNQ		33			216
68	Darrell Lanigan																					26			38	31	DNQ	204
69	Dave Marcis																								12	33		191
70	Danny Edwards Jr.					DNQ						24							22				DNQ		DNQ		DNQ	188
71	Bill Ingle								DNQ				22				26											182
72	Kyle Petty																								34		17	173
73	David Bonnett	17	DNQ								38														DNQ	DNQ		161
74	Tim Bender	18	DNQ	DNQ	37		DNQ											QL										161
75	Greg Biffle																									23	36	149
76	Andy Hillenburg	43	23		DNQ																							128
77	Dale Earnhardt Jr.													14														121
78	Butch Leitzinger														15													118
79	Michael Ritch	DNQ	QL		QL		DNQ																31			DNQ	39	116
80	Jim Sauter															QL				16								115
81	Robbie Reiser											DNQ				18									DNQ	DNQ		109
82	Ed Spencer III											42														22		97
83	Morgan Shepherd																			41	36							95
84	Peter Gibbons	DNQ																DNQ				DNQ			23	DNQ		94
85	Jerry Nadeau			39		39	DNQ										Wth											92
86	Lonnie Rush Jr.	38			40		DNQ																					92
87	Bill Hoff									DNQ							39							39				92
88	Bobby Hamilton																										24	91
89	Andy Houston								QL										24									91
90	Mike Cope																25		DNQ									88
91	Steve Park																								29			76
92	Chris Diamond					DNQ			DNQ				30						DNQ						DNQ	DNQ		73
93	Matt Kenseth										31																	70
94	Ted Christopher									41																	32	67
95	Brian Donley									DNQ		DNQ												32				67
96	Toshio Suzuki									33																		64
97	Ron Theil Jr.									23						34			DNQ				DNQ					61
98	Joey McCarthy									34																DNQ		61
99	Jeff Neal																								DNQ		34	61
100	Kevin Simmons		DNQ				DNQ				DNQ	34													DNQ			61
101	Eddie Johnson			DNQ																			36					55
102	A. J. Frank														36													55
103	Hal Browning											DNQ												38				49
104	David Hutto																								DNQ	DNQ	40	43
105	Jimmy Kitchens	DNQ	41	DNQ																								40
106	Jeff Burton										42																	37
107	Johnny Benson																										42	37
108	Jamie Aube	20								39																		
109	Tom Bolles	42								28																		
110	Mike Stefanik									14																		
111	Mike Olsen									21																		
112	Andy Santerre	22																										
113	Kelly Moore									31																		
114	Dale Shaw									36																		
115	Andy Belmont	DNQ																										
116	Jerry Marquis	DNQ																										
117	Rich Bickle	DNQ																										
118	Chad Chaffin	DNQ						DNQ			DNQ																	
119	John Nemechek		DNQ	DNQ																								
120	Curtis Miller		DNQ		DNQ						DNQ																	
121	Lester Lesneski		DNQ				DNQ	DNQ			DNQ																	
122	Terry Brooks			DNQ		DNQ			DNQ																			
123	Robert Pressley				DNQ																							
124	Mike Garvey					DNQ																						
125	Wayne Anderson					DNQ																						
126	Darryl Sage	QL				DNQ					DNQ																	
127	Martin Truex Sr.									DNQ																		
128	Kenny Kagle											DNQ																
129	Kevin Ray																	DNQ										
130	Troy Beebe																	DNQ										
131	Calvin Redwine																		DNQ									
132	Glenn Sullivan																		DNQ									
133	Jabe Jones																		DNQ									
134	Mark Day																		DNQ				DNQ		DNQ			
135	Toby Porter																								DNQ		DNQ	
136	Lyndon Amick																									DNQ		
137	Donnie Apple																									DNQ		
138	Tom Peck									QL																		
139	Joe Ruttman															QL												
140	Butch Miller															QL												
141	Ron Hornaday Jr.															QL												
142	Jay Sauter															QL												
Pos	Driver	DAY	CAR	RCH	ATL	NSV	DAR	BRI	HCY	NAZ	CLT	DOV	SBO	MYB	GLN	MLW	NHA	TAL	IRP	MCH	BRI	DAR	RCH	DOV	CLT	CAR	HOM	Pts

== Rookie of the Year ==
Former short track racer Glenn Allen Jr. was named Rookie of the Year in 1996, posting two top-ten finishes early in the season, as well as being of only two full-time contenders for the award. Mike Dillon was the other, finishing 23rd in points. Shane Hall, Mark Green and Tony Stewart were the other contenders, all running part-time schedules.

== See also ==
- 1996 NASCAR Winston Cup Series
- 1996 NASCAR Craftsman Truck Series
- 1996 NASCAR Winston West Series
