= David Hutto =

American racing driver (born 1977)

- Born: June 20, 1977 (age 49); Rock Hill, South Carolina, U.S.

NASCAR O'Reilly Auto Parts Series career
- 3 races run over 2 years
- Best finish: 84th (1997)
- First race: 1996 Jiffy Lube Miami 300 (Homestead)
- Last race: 1997 Diamond Hill Plywood 200 (Darlington)
Wins	Top tens	Poles
0	0	0
- Statistics up to date as of December 10, 2024.

David Hutto (born June 20, 1977) is an American former professional stock car racing driver who has competed in the NASCAR Busch Series from 1996 to 1997. He is a former champion of the now defunct NASCAR Goody's Dash Series, having won the championship in 1995.

Hutto has also previously competed in the NASCAR Southeast Series and the IPOWER Dash Series.

== Motorsports results ==
=== NASCAR ===
(key) (Bold - Pole position awarded by qualifying time. Italics - Pole position earned by points standings or practice time. * – Most laps led.)

==== Busch Series ====
NASCAR Busch Series results
Year	Team	No.	Make	1	2	3	4	5	6	7	8	9	10	11	12	13	14	15	16	17	18	19	20	21	22	23	24	25	26	27	28	29	30	NBSC	Pts	Ref
1996	Hutto Racing	07	Chevy	DAY	CAR	RCH	ATL	NSV	DAR	BRI	HCY	NZH	CLT	DOV	SBO	MYB	GLN	MLW	NHA	TAL	IRP	MCH	BRI	DAR	RCH	DOV	CLT; DNQ	CAR; DNQ						104th	43	
1996	Hutto Racing	97	Chevy																										HOM; 40					104th	43	
1997	Hutto Racing	24	Chevy	DAY; 42	CAR	RCH	ATL	LVS	DAR; 24	HCY	TEX	BRI	NSV	TAL	NHA	NZH	CLT; DNQ	DOV	SBO	GLN	MLW	MYB	GTY	IRP	MCH	BRI	DAR	RCH	DOV	CLT	CAL	CAR	HOM	84th	128	

Sporting positions
Preceded by Will Hobgood	NASCAR Goody's Dash Series Champion; 1995	Succeeded by Lyndon Amick
