= Caraway Speedway =

Automobile racetrack near Asheboro, North Carolina

- Location: Asheboro, North Carolina
- Coordinates: 35°45′58″N 79°53′06″W
- Owner: Russell Hackett (1977–present)
- Operator: Darren & Renee Hackett (2011–present)
- Opened: 1966
- Major events: Current: SMART Modified Tour (1990–2016, 2020–present); CARS Tour (1998–1999, 2012, 2021–present); Former: NASCAR Southeast Series (1996–2000, 2004–2005); NASCAR Busch Series (1982–1983)

Paved Oval (1972–present)
- Surface: Asphalt
- Length: 0.455 mi (0.732 km)
- Turns: 4

Original Dirt Oval (1966–1971)
- Surface: Dirt
- Length: 0.455 mi (0.732 km)
- Turns: 4

Caraway Speedway is a short track located near Asheboro, North Carolina, U.S. Caraway Speedway was built in 1966 as a dirt track. The track was paved in 1972 and joined the NASCAR Advance Auto Parts Weekly Series family as a 0.455 mi (0.732 km) asphalt short track. Caraway Speedway was owned and operated by Russell and Valastra Hackett from 1977 to 2010. Russell turned over operations to Darren and Renee Hackett for the 2011 season. Caraway Speedway hosts a variety of weekly series, several Whelen Southern Modified Series events, as well as other touring series.

They host Saturday night events at 7:00 pm to allow fans to spend some time with their favorite drivers after the race.

Caraway Speedway hosted three NASCAR Busch Series races, from 1982 to 1983, eight NASCAR Southeast Series events between 1996 and 2005.

The facility also hosted 60 NASCAR Whelen Southern Modified Tour events from the inaugural season in 2005 until the series' last season in 2016.

The track hosted three CARS Tour races between 1998 and 2012. The series returned in 2021.

== Records ==
- Track record – George Brunnhoelzl III (0:15.648 sec. @ 104.678 mph) NASCAR Whelen Southern Modified Tour.

== Past Busch Series winners ==
Year	Date	Driver	Team	Manufacturer	Race distance		Race time	Average speed (mph)	Report
Year	Date	Driver	Team	Manufacturer	Miles	Laps	Race time	Average speed (mph)	Report
1982	April 23	Dale Earnhardt	Robert Gee	Oldsmobile	100	200		105.140	
1982	July 7	Jack Ingram	Jack Ingram	Pontiac	100	200		106.132	
1983	July 6	Butch Lindley	Kerry Bodenhamer	Pontiac	100	200		105.374	

== Late model track champions ==
Year	Driver
1986	Randy Smith
1987	Bobby Labonte
1988	Dennis Setzer
1989	Dennis Setzer
1990	Dennis Setzer
1991	Herb Poole
1992	Greg Marlowe
1993	Mike Skinner
1994	Greg Marlowe
1995	Stephen Grimes
1996	Donnie Apple
1997	Stephen Grimes
1998	Steve Loftin
1999	Steve Loftin
2000	Jason York
2001	Jason York
2002	Steve Loftin
2003	Justin Labonte
2004	Travis Swaim
2005	Travis Swaim
2006	Brad Brinkley
2007	Randy Benson
2008	Randy Benson
2009	Travis Swaim
2010	Travis Swaim
2011	Brad Brinkley
2012	Mack Little III
2013	Ryan Wilson
2014	Robert Tyler
2015	Nathan Buttke
2016	Tommy Lemons, Jr.
2017	Ryan Wilson
2018	Ran part-time, no champion crowned
2019	Mack Little III (Ran under the Late Model Sportsman banner)
2020	Coy Beard (Ran under the Limited/Challenger banner)
2021	Blaise Brinkley
2022	Coy Beard
2023	Jason York

== See also ==
- List of NASCAR race tracks
- Whelen All-American Series
- Whelen Southern Modified Tour
