= NASCAR AutoZone Elite Division, Southeast Series =

American auto racing series

The NASCAR AutoZone Elite Division, Southeast Series was a NASCAR-sanctioned amateur/semi-pro late model stock car racing series based in the Southeastern United States. The series was formerly known as the Slim Jim All Pro Series; it was founded in 1991 as the result of a merger between the All PRO Super Series and the NASCAR All-American Challenge Series The drivers who have graduated from this series include Shawna Robinson, Rick Crawford, Robert Huffman, Jason Keller, and David Reutimann. NASCAR terminated the series, along with other AutoZone Elite Division series, following the 2006 season.

== List of champions (NASCAR All Pro Series/Southeast Series) ==
The following drivers won the All Pro Series/Southeast Series championship between the series' inception in 1991 and its termination in 2006.

Year	Champion	Most Popular Driver	Rookie of the Year
1991	Jody Ridley	Jody Ridley	Bart Ingram
1992	Jody Ridley	Jody Ridley	David Probst
1993	Jody Ridley	Jody Ridley	Scot Walters
1994	Mike Cope	Mike Cope	Ron Barfield Jr.
1995	Hal Goodson	Mike Cope	Jimmy Britts
1996	Mike Cope	Tammy Jo Kirk	Steven Christian
1997	Hal Goodson	Hank Parker Jr.	David Reutimann
1998	Freddie Query	Scott Kilby	Scott Kilby
1999	Wayne Anderson	Billy Bigley	Coy Gibbs
2000	Billy Bigley	David Reutimann	Casey Yunick
2001	Wayne Anderson	Wayne Anderson	Charlie Bradberry
2002	Jeff Fultz	Jody Lavender	Jason Hogan
2003	Charlie Bradberry	Charlie Bradberry	John Wilkinson III
2004	Jeff Fultz	Kevin Prince	J. R. Norris
2005	Jeff Fultz	Jeff Fultz	Gary Helton
2006	J. R. Norris	J. R. Norris	Josh Hamner

== List of champions (NASCAR All-American Challenge Series) ==
The following drivers won the All-American Challenge Series championship between the series' inception in 1984 and its merger into the All-Pro Series termination in 1991.

Year	Champion	Most Popular Driver	Rookie of the Year
1984	Mike Alexander		
1985	Dave Mader III		
1986	Dave Mader III		
1987	Dave Mader III		
1988	Dave Mader III		
1989	Stanley Smith		
1990	Mike Garvey		

== List of champions (All PRO Super Series) ==
The following drivers won the All PRO Super Series championship between the series' inception in 1980 and its merger into the All-Pro Series termination in 1991.

Year	Champion	Most Popular Driver	Rookie of the Year
1980	Don Sprouse		
1981	Randy Couch		
1982	Randy Couch		
1983	Freddie Fryar		
1984	Darrell Brown		
1985	Steve Grissom		
1986	Gary Balough		
1987	Jody Ridley		
1988	Jody Ridley		
1989	Joe Nemechek		
1990	Jody Ridley		
