= Volusia Speedway Park =

Race track

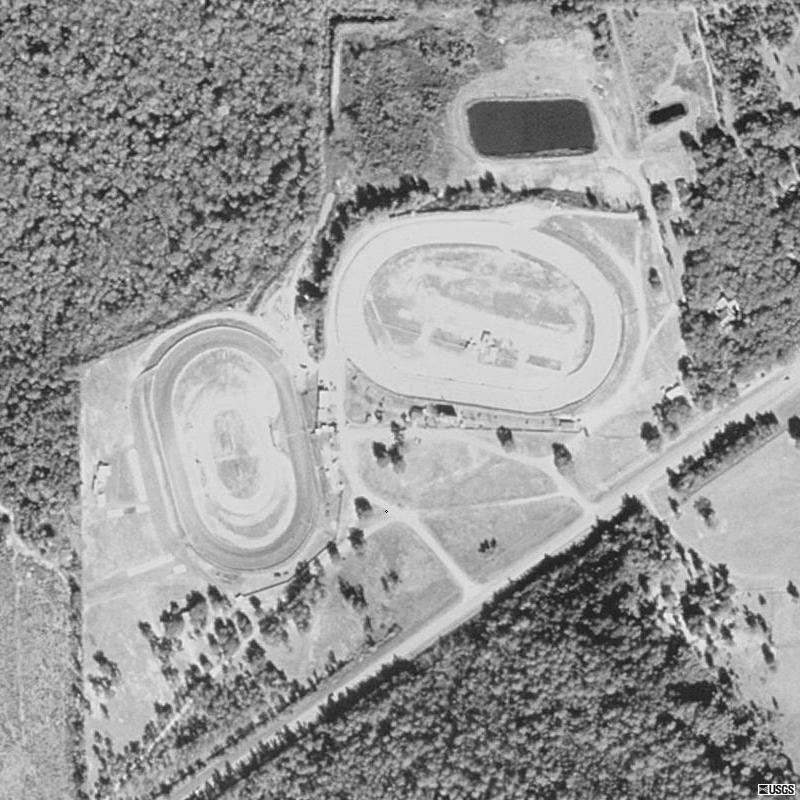
- Aerial view of Volusia Speedway Park
- Location: 1500 East State Rd. 40, De Leon Springs, Florida
- Coordinates: 29.215°N 81.345°W
- Owner: World Racing Group
- Opened: 1968
- Former names: Volusia County Speedway (1968–1997)
- Major events: NASCAR Busch Series (1989–92); NASCAR Southeast Series (1991–98); World of Outlaws; Super DIRTcar Series; All Star Circuit of Champions

1/2 mile oval
- Surface: Dirt (clay)
- Length: 0.8 km (0.50 mi)
- Turns: 4
- Banking: Turns 14° Straightaways 7°

1/5 mile karting oval
- Surface: Dirt (clay)
- Length: 0.20 mi (0.32 km)
- Turns: 4
- Banking: Slightly banked

Volusia Speedway Park (formerly known as Volusia County Speedway and Barberville Speedway) is an auto racing facility located near Barberville in Volusia County, Florida. It currently operates as a 1/2-mile dirt oval and a 1/5-mile dirt oval for karts.

== Overview ==
The track was built by Benny Corbin and opened in 1968 as a 1/4 mile dirt oval, operating through 1969. It expanded to 3/8 mile (still dirt) in August 1969, operating through 1971. It was expanded again to 1/2 mile in February 1972. Dick Murphy bought the racetrack in 1982, and paved it in 1989. Murphy sold it in 1992, and re-purchased it in 1997, when it was converted back to dirt.

The 3/8 mile dirt oval opened behind turn four of the original oval, operating from 1993 until it was paved in 1998 for a NASCAR Southeast Series event, but in 1999 it was converted back into dirt. In late 2004 the paved surface was torn up and removed and the karting track that was located inside of the asphalt track was redesigned and took over all of the former track. The 1/5 mile dirt karting track complex is known as "Volusia Karting".

Murphy sold the facility in 2005 to DIRT Motorsports, later renamed the World Racing Group.

Various pit scenes from the 1990 film Days of Thunder were filmed at the speedway.

== Events ==
The track currently hosts races from both the World of Outlaws Sprint Car and Late Model series, along with the DIRTcar UMP late model series, the Super DIRTcar Series Big-Block Modifieds and UMP Modifieds. In 2021, Daytona Beach Bike Week flat track events, sanctioned by American Flat Track, moved from Daytona to Volusia Speedway Park. In 2022, American Flat Track added a Biketoberfest race at Volusia.

=== Winternationals ===
Since 1972 Volusia Speedway Park’s showcase event has been the now branded DIRTcar Nationals. Originally a three-night event, it has grown to a three-week extravaganza of DIRTcar racing featuring the nation’s premier short-track racing divisions. Wayne Shugart claimed the first championship, and competition for the Gator Trophy has since marked the beginning of the short-track racing season.

=== NASCAR events ===
The NASCAR Southeast Series had run nine races in the complex between 1991 and 1998, the first eight events were on the 1/2 mile paved track. The last event, in 1998, was on the 3/8 mile recently paved oval but since it was converted back into dirt for 1999, the track was removed from the Southeast schedule.

From 1989 until 1992, the track hosted a NASCAR Busch Series race on the 1/2 mile layout.

Date	Winner	Race
July 1, 1989	Rob Moroso	Firecracker 200
June 23, 1990	Tommy Houston	Firecracker 200
March 24, 1991	Kenny Wallace	Spring 200
July 12, 1992	Steve Grissom	X-1R Firecracker 200
