= 2001 Alltel 200 =

Second race of the 2001 NASCAR Busch Series

Race details
- Race 2 of 33 of the 2001 NASCAR Busch Series
- Date: February 24, 2001
- Official name: 19th Annual Alltel 200
- Location: North Carolina Speedway, Rockingham, North Carolina
- Course: Permanent racing facility
- Course length: 1.017 miles (1.636 km)
- Distance: 197 laps, 200.349 mi (322.43 km)
- Scheduled distance: 197 laps, 200.349 mi (322.43 km)
- Average speed: 112.049 miles per hour (180.325 km/h)

Pole position
Driver	Greg Biffle	Roush Racing
- Time: 23.414

Most laps led
Driver	Todd Bodine	Buckshot Racing
- Laps: 146

Winner
No. 00	Todd Bodine	Buckshot Racing

Television in the United States
- Network: FX
- Announcers: Mike Joy, Larry McReynolds, Darrell Waltrip

Radio in the United States
- Radio: Motor Racing Network

The 2001 Alltel 200 was the second stock car race of the 2001 NASCAR Busch Series and the 19th iteration of the event. The race was held on Saturday, February 24, 2001, in Rockingham, North Carolina, at North Carolina Speedway, a 1.017 miles (1.637 km) permanent high-banked racetrack. The race took the scheduled 197 laps to complete. At race's end, Todd Bodine of Buckshot Racing would successfully defend the field, pitting for four tires late in the race to complete a dominant performance for the day to win the race. The win was Bodine's 12th career NASCAR Busch Series win and his first of the season. To fill out the podium, Kevin Harvick of Richard Childress Racing and Greg Biffle of Roush Racing would finish second and third, respectively.

== Background ==
The layout of North Carolina Speedway, the venue where the race was held.

North Carolina Speedway was opened as a flat, one-mile oval on October 31, 1965. In 1969, the track was extensively reconfigured to a high-banked, D-shaped oval just over one mile in length. In 1997, North Carolina Motor Speedway merged with Penske Motorsports, and was renamed North Carolina Speedway. Shortly thereafter, the infield was reconfigured, and competition on the infield road course, mostly by the SCCA, was discontinued. Currently, the track is home to the Fast Track High Performance Driving School.

=== Entry list ===
#	Driver	Team	Make	Sponsor
00	Todd Bodine	Buckshot Racing	Chevrolet	Motor Racing Outreach
1	P. J. Jones	Phoenix Racing	Chevrolet	Yellow Transportation
01	Andy Santerre	Santerre-Reece Motorsports	Chevrolet	Santerre-Reece Motorsports
2	Kevin Harvick	Richard Childress Racing	Chevrolet	ACDelco
02	Ryan Newman	Penske Racing South	Ford	Alltel
7	Randy LaJoie	Evans Motorsports	Chevrolet	Cottonelle, Kleenex
8	Blaise Alexander	HighLine Performance Group	Chevrolet	Channellock, InvenCom
10	Jeff Green	ppc Racing	Ford	Nesquik
11	Marty Houston	HighLine Performance Group	Chevrolet	Channellock
14	Larry Foyt	A. J. Foyt Enterprises	Chevrolet	Harrah's
16	Sammy Sanders	Day Enterprise Racing	Pontiac	31-W Insulation
17	Clay Rogers	Reiser Enterprises	Chevrolet	Visine
18	Jeff Purvis	Joe Gibbs Racing	Pontiac	MBNA
20	Mike McLaughlin	Joe Gibbs Racing	Pontiac	Joe Gibbs Racing
21	Mike Dillon	Richard Childress Racing	Chevrolet	Rockwell Automation
23	Scott Wimmer	Bill Davis Racing	Pontiac	Jani-King
25	Chad Chaffin	Team Rensi Motorsports	Chevrolet	U.S. Marines
26	Bobby Hamilton Jr.	Carroll Racing	Chevrolet	Dr Pepper
27	Jamie McMurray	Brewco Motorsports	Chevrolet	Williams Travel Centers
28	Brad Baker	Brewco Motorsports	Chevrolet	Brewco Motorsports
33	Tony Raines	BACE Motorsports	Chevrolet	Alka-Seltzer
34	David Green	Cicci-Welliver Racing	Chevrolet	Moss Windows
36	Hank Parker Jr.	Cicci-Welliver Racing	Chevrolet	GNC
37	Kevin Grubb	Brewco Motorsports	Chevrolet	Timber Wolf
43	Jay Sauter	Curb Agajanian Motorsports	Chevrolet	Quality Farm Stores
46	Ashton Lewis Jr.	Lewis Motorsports	Chevrolet	Lewis Motorsports
48	Kenny Wallace	Innovative Motorsports	Chevrolet	Goulds Pumps
49	Robbie Faggart	Jay Robinson Racing	Chevrolet	Jay Robinson Racing
52	Jason Rudd	Means Racing	Ford	Means Racing
55	Mark Green	ST Motorsports	Ford	ST Motorsports
57	Jason Keller	ppc Racing	Ford	Albertsons
59	Rich Bickle	ST Motorsports	Chevrolet	Kingsford
60	Greg Biffle	Roush Racing	Ford	Grainger
61	Tim Sauter	Xpress Motorsports	Chevrolet	Stoops Freightliner
63	Shane Hall	Hensley Motorsports	Ford	Lance Snacks
66	Tim Fedewa	Cicci-Welliver Racing	Chevrolet	Phillips 66
74	Chad Little	BACE Motorsports	Chevrolet	Staff America
77	Kelly Denton	PRW Racing	Ford	Merck-Medco
86	Sean Studer	Winner's Circle Racing	Chevrolet	Winner's Circle Racing
92	Jimmie Johnson	Herzog Motorsports	Chevrolet	Excedrin
93	Bill Hoff	Hoff Motorsports	Chevrolet	93.3 WMMR Rocks
98	Elton Sawyer	Akins Motorsports	Ford	Starter, East Carolina University
Official entry list

== Practice ==
Originally, there were two planned practice sessions to occur, with both being held on Friday, February 23, with the first being held at 11:00 AM EST, and the second being held at 4:00 PM EST, with both sessions lasting for an hour. However, both sessions were cancelled to due rain.

== Qualifying ==
Qualifying was held on Friday, February 23, at 2:15 PM EST. Each driver would have two laps to set a fastest time; the fastest of the two would count as their official qualifying lap. Positions 1-36 would be decided on time, while positions 37-43 would be based on provisionals. Six spots are awarded by the use of provisionals based on owner's points. The seventh is awarded to a past champion who has not otherwise qualified for the race. If no past champ needs the provisional, the next team in the owner points will be awarded a provisional.

Greg Biffle of Roush Racing would win the pole, setting a time of 23.414 and an average speed of 156.368 miles per hour (251.650 km/h).

No drivers would fail to qualify.

Pos.	#	Driver	Team	Make	Time	Speed
1	60	Greg Biffle	Roush Racing	Ford	23.414	156.368
2	02	Ryan Newman	Penske Racing South	Ford	23.543	155.511
3	00	Todd Bodine	Buckshot Racing	Chevrolet	23.679	154.618
4	48	Kenny Wallace	Innovative Motorsports	Chevrolet	23.744	154.195
5	10	Jeff Green	ppc Racing	Ford	23.755	154.123
6	46	Ashton Lewis Jr.	Lewis Motorsports	Chevrolet	23.813	153.748
7	26	Bobby Hamilton Jr.	Carroll Racing	Chevrolet	23.820	153.703
8	20	Mike McLaughlin	Joe Gibbs Racing	Pontiac	23.833	153.619
9	23	Scott Wimmer	Bill Davis Racing	Pontiac	23.886	153.278
10	37	Kevin Grubb	Brewco Motorsports	Chevrolet	23.895	153.220
11	27	Jamie McMurray	Brewco Motorsports	Chevrolet	23.896	153.214
12	18	Jeff Purvis	Joe Gibbs Racing	Pontiac	23.918	153.073
13	59	Rich Bickle	ST Motorsports	Chevrolet	23.820	153.060
14	98	Elton Sawyer	Akins Motorsports	Ford	23.922	153.047
15	7	Randy LaJoie	Evans Motorsports	Chevrolet	23.925	153.028
16	01	Andy Santerre	Santerre-Reece Motorsports	Chevrolet	23.940	152.932
17	92	Jimmie Johnson	Herzog Motorsports	Chevrolet	23.962	152.792
18	33	Tony Raines	BACE Motorsports	Chevrolet	23.980	152.677
19	61	Tim Sauter	Xpress Motorsports	Chevrolet	23.988	152.626
20	14	Larry Foyt	A. J. Foyt Enterprises	Chevrolet	24.005	152.518
21	34	David Green	Cicci-Welliver Racing	Chevrolet	24.019	152.429
22	2	Kevin Harvick	Richard Childress Racing	Chevrolet	24.030	152.360
23	57	Jason Keller	ppc Racing	Ford	24.034	152.334
24	11	Marty Houston	HighLine Performance Group	Chevrolet	24.062	152.157
25	43	Jay Sauter	Curb Agajanian Motorsports	Chevrolet	24.074	152.081
26	77	Kelly Denton	PRW Racing	Ford	24.086	152.005
27	21	Mike Dillon	Richard Childress Racing	Chevrolet	24.097	151.936
28	55	Mark Green	ST Motorsports	Ford	24.101	151.911
29	25	Chad Chaffin	Team Rensi Motorsports	Chevrolet	24.181	151.408
30	66	Tim Fedewa	Cicci-Welliver Racing	Chevrolet	24.195	151.321
31	74	Chad Little	BACE Motorsports	Chevrolet	24.260	150.915
32	36	Hank Parker Jr.	Cicci-Welliver Racing	Chevrolet	24.267	150.872
33	8	Blaise Alexander	HighLine Performance Group	Chevrolet	24.309	150.611
34	17	Clay Rogers	Reiser Enterprises	Chevrolet	24.326	150.506
35	28	Brad Baker	Brewco Motorsports	Chevrolet	24.338	150.431
36	63	Shane Hall	Hensley Motorsports	Ford	24.359	150.302
Provisionals
37	1	P. J. Jones	Phoenix Racing	Chevrolet	—	—
38	16	Sammy Sanders	Day Enterprise Racing	Pontiac	—	—
39	49	Robbie Faggart	Jay Robinson Racing	Chevrolet	—	—
40	52	Jason Rudd	Means Racing	Ford	—	—
41	93	Bill Hoff	Hoff Motorsports	Chevrolet	—	—
42	86	Sean Studer	Winner's Circle Racing	Chevrolet	—	—
Official qualifying results

== Race results ==
Fin	St	#	Driver	Team	Make	Laps	Led	Status	Pts	Winnings
1	3	00	Todd Bodine	Buckshot Racing	Chevrolet	197	146	running	185	$42,450
2	22	2	Kevin Harvick	Richard Childress Racing	Chevrolet	197	0	running	170	$24,875
3	1	60	Greg Biffle	Roush Racing	Ford	197	1	running	170	$23,575
4	4	48	Kenny Wallace	Innovative Motorsports	Chevrolet	197	0	running	160	$25,100
5	7	26	Bobby Hamilton Jr.	Carroll Racing	Chevrolet	197	0	running	155	$19,900
6	12	18	Jeff Purvis	Joe Gibbs Racing	Pontiac	197	0	running	150	$15,650
7	13	59	Rich Bickle	ST Motorsports	Chevrolet	197	0	running	146	$14,650
8	5	10	Jeff Green	ppc Racing	Ford	197	38	running	147	$19,950
9	2	02	Ryan Newman	Penske Racing South	Ford	197	5	running	143	$10,050
10	23	57	Jason Keller	ppc Racing	Ford	197	0	running	134	$20,375
11	25	43	Jay Sauter	Curb Agajanian Motorsports	Chevrolet	197	0	running	130	$13,900
12	10	37	Kevin Grubb	Brewco Motorsports	Chevrolet	197	0	running	127	$13,725
13	17	92	Jimmie Johnson	Herzog Motorsports	Chevrolet	196	0	running	124	$12,650
14	8	20	Mike McLaughlin	Joe Gibbs Racing	Pontiac	196	0	running	121	$9,575
15	31	74	Chad Little	BACE Motorsports	Chevrolet	196	0	running	118	$8,525
16	33	8	Blaise Alexander	HighLine Performance Group	Chevrolet	196	0	running	115	$9,475
17	32	36	Hank Parker Jr.	Cicci-Welliver Racing	Chevrolet	196	3	running	117	$16,925
18	34	17	Clay Rogers	Reiser Enterprises	Chevrolet	196	0	running	109	$13,875
19	27	21	Mike Dillon	Richard Childress Racing	Chevrolet	196	0	running	106	$12,325
20	28	55	Mark Green	ST Motorsports	Ford	196	0	running	103	$11,075
21	19	61	Tim Sauter	Xpress Motorsports	Chevrolet	196	0	running	100	$9,225
22	29	25	Chad Chaffin	Team Rensi Motorsports	Chevrolet	195	0	running	97	$11,175
23	16	01	Andy Santerre	Santerre-Reece Motorsports	Chevrolet	195	0	running	94	$9,125
24	20	14	Larry Foyt	A. J. Foyt Enterprises	Chevrolet	195	0	running	91	$9,075
25	36	63	Shane Hall	Hensley Motorsports	Ford	194	4	running	93	$12,125
26	11	27	Jamie McMurray	Brewco Motorsports	Chevrolet	193	0	crash	85	$16,475
27	26	77	Kelly Denton	PRW Racing	Ford	193	0	running	82	$8,925
28	21	34	David Green	Cicci-Welliver Racing	Chevrolet	193	0	running	79	$16,375
29	14	98	Elton Sawyer	Akins Motorsports	Ford	192	0	crash	76	$16,325
30	30	66	Tim Fedewa	Cicci-Welliver Racing	Chevrolet	192	0	crash	73	$16,375
31	9	23	Scott Wimmer	Bill Davis Racing	Pontiac	192	0	crash	70	$8,725
32	15	7	Randy LaJoie	Evans Motorsports	Chevrolet	192	0	running	67	$8,675
33	6	46	Ashton Lewis Jr.	Lewis Motorsports	Chevrolet	192	0	running	64	$8,625
34	35	28	Brad Baker	Brewco Motorsports	Chevrolet	191	0	running	61	$8,575
35	39	49	Robbie Faggart	Jay Robinson Racing	Chevrolet	186	0	running	58	$8,525
36	38	16	Sammy Sanders	Day Enterprise Racing	Pontiac	185	0	running	55	$8,475
37	37	1	P. J. Jones	Phoenix Racing	Chevrolet	166	0	running	52	$14,925
38	18	33	Tony Raines	BACE Motorsports	Chevrolet	140	0	crash	49	$11,385
39	42	86	Sean Studer	Winner's Circle Racing	Chevrolet	93	0	engine	0	$8,340
40	40	52	Jason Rudd	Means Racing	Ford	26	0	engine	43	$8,305
41	41	93	Bill Hoff	Hoff Motorsports	Chevrolet	20	0	engine	40	$8,270
42	24	11	Marty Houston	HighLine Performance Group	Chevrolet	6	0	crash	37	$8,235
Official race results

Previous race: 2001 NAPA Auto Parts 300	NASCAR Busch Series; 2001 season	Next race: 2001 Sam's Town 300
