= 2001 Sam's Town 300 =

Third race of the 2001 NASCAR Busch Series

Race details
- Race 3 of 33 of the 2001 NASCAR Busch Series
- Date: March 3, 2001
- Official name: 5th Annual Sam's Town 300
- Location: North Las Vegas, Nevada, Las Vegas Motor Speedway
- Course: Permanent racing facility
- Course length: 2.41 km (1.5 miles)
- Distance: 200 laps, 300 mi (482.803 km)
- Scheduled distance: 200 laps, 300 mi (482.803 km)
- Average speed: 125.625 miles per hour (202.174 km/h)

Pole position
Driver	Matt Kenseth	Reiser Enterprises
- Time: 31.880

Most laps led
Driver	Todd Bodine	Buckshot Racing
- Laps: 104

Winner
No. 00	Todd Bodine	Buckshot Racing

Television in the United States
- Network: FX
- Announcers: Mike Joy, Larry McReynolds, Darrell Waltrip

Radio in the United States
- Radio: Motor Racing Network

The 2001 Sam's Town 300 was the third stock car race of the 2001 NASCAR Busch Series and the fifth iteration of the event. The race was held on Saturday, March 3, 2001, in North Las Vegas, Nevada at Las Vegas Motor Speedway, a 1.5 miles (2.4 km) permanent D-shaped oval racetrack. The race took the scheduled 200 laps to complete. At race's end, Buckshot Racing driver Todd Bodine came back after a bad pit stop to pull away on the final restart with four to go to win his 13th career NASCAR Busch Series win and his second and final win of the season. To fill out the podium, Greg Biffle of Roush Racing and Jason Keller of ppc Racing would finish second and third, respectively.

== Background ==
The layout of Las Vegas Motor Speedway, the venue where the race was held.

Las Vegas Motor Speedway, located in Clark County, Nevada outside the Las Vegas city limits and about 15 miles northeast of the Las Vegas Strip, is a 1,200-acre (490 ha) complex of multiple tracks for motorsports racing. The complex is owned by Speedway Motorsports, Inc., which is headquartered in Charlotte, North Carolina.

=== Entry list ===
#	Driver	Team	Make	Sponsor
00	Todd Bodine	Buckshot Racing	Chevrolet	Shasta
1	P. J. Jones	Phoenix Racing	Chevrolet	Yellow Transportation
2	Kevin Harvick	Richard Childress Racing	Chevrolet	ACDelco
7	Randy LaJoie	Evans Motorsports	Chevrolet	Cottonelle, Kleenex
8	Blaise Alexander	HighLine Performance Group	Chevrolet	Channellock
9	Jeff Burton	Roush Racing	Ford	Gain
10	Jeff Green	ppc Racing	Ford	Nesquik
11	Marty Houston	HighLine Performance Group	Chevrolet	Channellock
14	Larry Foyt	A. J. Foyt Enterprises	Chevrolet	Harrah's
16	Sammy Sanders	Day Enterprise Racing	Pontiac	31-W Insulation
17	Matt Kenseth	Reiser Enterprises	Chevrolet	Visine
18	Jeff Purvis	Joe Gibbs Racing	Pontiac	MBNA
20	Mike McLaughlin	Joe Gibbs Racing	Pontiac	Joe Gibbs Racing
21	Mike Dillon	Richard Childress Racing	Chevrolet	Rockwell Automation
23	Scott Wimmer	Bill Davis Racing	Pontiac	Jani-King
25	Chad Chaffin	Team Rensi Motorsports	Chevrolet	U.S. Marines
26	Bobby Hamilton Jr.	Carroll Racing	Chevrolet	Dr Pepper
27	Jamie McMurray	Brewco Motorsports	Chevrolet	Williams Travel Centers
28	Brad Baker	Brewco Motorsports	Chevrolet	Brewco Motorsports
33	Tony Raines	BACE Motorsports	Chevrolet	Alka-Seltzer
34	David Green	Cicci-Welliver Racing	Chevrolet	AFG Glass
36	Hank Parker Jr.	Cicci-Welliver Racing	Chevrolet	GNC
37	Kevin Grubb	Brewco Motorsports	Chevrolet	Timber Wolf
38	Christian Elder	Akins Motorsports	Ford	Great Clips
43	Jay Sauter	Curb Agajanian Motorsports	Chevrolet	Quality Farm Stores
46	Ashton Lewis Jr.	Lewis Motorsports	Chevrolet	Lewis Motorsports
48	Kenny Wallace	Innovative Motorsports	Chevrolet	Goulds Pumps
49	Brian Tyler	Jay Robinson Racing	Chevrolet	Jay Robinson Racing
52	Scott Gaylord	Means Racing	Ford	Means Racing
55	Mark Green	ST Motorsports	Ford	ST Motorsports
57	Jason Keller	ppc Racing	Ford	Albertsons
59	Rich Bickle	ST Motorsports	Chevrolet	Kingsford
60	Greg Biffle	Roush Racing	Ford	Grainger
61	Tim Sauter	Xpress Motorsports	Chevrolet	Stoops Freightliner
63	Shane Hall	Hensley Motorsports	Ford	Lance Snacks
66	Tim Fedewa	Cicci-Welliver Racing	Chevrolet	Phillips 66
71	Kevin Lepage	Matrix Motorsports	Ford	State Fair Corn Dogs
74	Chad Little	BACE Motorsports	Chevrolet	Staff America
77	Kelly Denton	PRW Racing	Ford	Merck-Medco
87	Joe Nemechek	NEMCO Motorsports	Chevrolet	Cellular One
92	Jimmie Johnson	Herzog Motorsports	Chevrolet	Excedrin
98	Elton Sawyer	Akins Motorsports	Ford	Hot Tamales
99	Michael Waltrip	Michael Waltrip Racing	Chevrolet	Aaron's
Official entry list

== Practice ==
Originally, there were two planned practice sessions to occur, with both being held on Friday, March 2, with the first being an hour-long session held at 11:15 AM PST, and the second being held after qualifying. However, both sessions were cancelled due to rain.

== Qualifying ==
Qualifying was held on Friday, March 2, at 12:15 PM PST. Each driver would have two laps to set a fastest time; the fastest of the two would count as their official qualifying lap. Positions 1-36 would be decided on time, while positions 37-43 would be based on provisionals. Six spots are awarded by the use of provisionals based on owner's points. The seventh is awarded to a past champion who has not otherwise qualified for the race. If no past champ needs the provisional, the next team in the owner points will be awarded a provisional.

Matt Kenseth of Reiser Enterprises would win the pole, setting a time of 31.880 and an average speed of 169.385 miles per hour (272.599 km/h).

No drivers would fail to qualify.

=== Full qualifying results ===
Pos.	#	Driver	Team	Make	Time	Speed
1	17	Matt Kenseth	Reiser Enterprises	Chevrolet	31.880	169.385
2	00	Todd Bodine	Buckshot Racing	Chevrolet	32.050	168.487
3	60	Greg Biffle	Roush Racing	Ford	32.058	168.445
4	26	Bobby Hamilton Jr.	Carroll Racing	Chevrolet	32.117	168.135
5	46	Ashton Lewis Jr.	Lewis Motorsports	Chevrolet	32.155	167.937
6	27	Jamie McMurray	Brewco Motorsports	Chevrolet	32.183	167.790
7	92	Jimmie Johnson	Herzog Motorsports	Chevrolet	32.226	167.567
8	20	Mike McLaughlin	Joe Gibbs Racing	Pontiac	32.228	167.556
9	87	Joe Nemechek	NEMCO Motorsports	Chevrolet	32.245	167.468
10	48	Kenny Wallace	Innovative Motorsports	Chevrolet	32.295	167.209
11	71	Kevin Lepage	Matrix Motorsports	Ford	32.321	167.074
12	74	Chad Little	BACE Motorsports	Chevrolet	32.359	166.878
13	10	Jeff Green	ppc Racing	Ford	32.392	166.708
14	98	Elton Sawyer	Akins Motorsports	Ford	32.400	166.667
15	37	Kevin Grubb	Brewco Motorsports	Chevrolet	32.421	166.559
16	2	Kevin Harvick	Richard Childress Racing	Chevrolet	32.424	166.543
17	55	Mark Green	ST Motorsports	Ford	32.428	166.523
18	11	Marty Houston	HighLine Performance Group	Chevrolet	32.432	166.502
19	14	Larry Foyt	A. J. Foyt Enterprises	Chevrolet	32.449	166.415
20	57	Jason Keller	ppc Racing	Ford	32.495	166.179
21	61	Tim Sauter	Xpress Motorsports	Chevrolet	32.500	166.154
22	36	Hank Parker Jr.	Cicci-Welliver Racing	Chevrolet	32.529	166.006
23	1	P. J. Jones	Phoenix Racing	Chevrolet	32.532	165.990
24	7	Randy LaJoie	Evans Motorsports	Chevrolet	32.535	165.975
25	25	Chad Chaffin	Team Rensi Motorsports	Chevrolet	32.553	165.883
26	9	Jeff Burton	Roush Racing	Ford	32.599	165.649
27	34	David Green	Cicci-Welliver Racing	Chevrolet	32.615	165.568
28	77	Kelly Denton	PRW Racing	Ford	32.616	165.563
29	43	Jay Sauter	Curb Agajanian Motorsports	Chevrolet	32.620	165.543
30	66	Tim Fedewa	Cicci-Welliver Racing	Chevrolet	32.625	165.517
31	33	Tony Raines	BACE Motorsports	Chevrolet	32.798	164.644
32	38	Christian Elder	Akins Motorsports	Ford	32.832	164.474
33	99	Michael Waltrip	Michael Waltrip Racing	Chevrolet	32.866	164.304
34	18	Jeff Purvis	Joe Gibbs Racing	Pontiac	32.882	164.224
35	23	Scott Wimmer	Bill Davis Racing	Pontiac	32.913	164.069
36	8	Blaise Alexander	HighLine Performance Group	Chevrolet	32.969	163.790
Provisionals
37	59	Rich Bickle	ST Motorsports	Chevrolet	33.002	163.626
38	21	Mike Dillon	Richard Childress Racing	Chevrolet	33.171	162.793
39	63	Shane Hall	Hensley Motorsports	Ford	33.028	163.498
40	28	Brad Baker	Brewco Motorsports	Chevrolet	33.512	161.136
41	16	Sammy Sanders	Day Enterprise Racing	Pontiac	33.841	159.570
42	49	Brian Tyler	Jay Robinson Racing	Chevrolet	35.379	152.633
43	52	Scott Gaylord	Means Racing	Ford	34.780	155.262
Official qualifying results

== Race results ==
Fin	St	#	Driver	Team	Make	Laps	Led	Status	Pts	Winnings
1	2	00	Todd Bodine	Buckshot Racing	Chevrolet	200	104	running	185	$94,450
2	3	60	Greg Biffle	Roush Racing	Ford	200	39	running	175	$59,925
3	20	57	Jason Keller	ppc Racing	Ford	200	0	running	165	$53,100
4	31	33	Tony Raines	BACE Motorsports	Chevrolet	200	8	running	165	$35,500
5	13	10	Jeff Green	ppc Racing	Ford	200	0	running	155	$39,000
6	26	9	Jeff Burton	Roush Racing	Ford	200	0	running	150	$23,350
7	9	87	Joe Nemechek	NEMCO Motorsports	Chevrolet	200	0	running	146	$22,300
8	14	98	Elton Sawyer	Akins Motorsports	Ford	200	1	running	147	$25,350
9	8	20	Mike McLaughlin	Joe Gibbs Racing	Pontiac	200	0	running	138	$20,300
10	29	43	Jay Sauter	Curb Agajanian Motorsports	Chevrolet	200	0	running	134	$25,550
11	35	23	Scott Wimmer	Bill Davis Racing	Pontiac	200	0	running	130	$19,100
12	16	2	Kevin Harvick	Richard Childress Racing	Chevrolet	200	0	running	127	$28,150
13	21	61	Tim Sauter	Xpress Motorsports	Chevrolet	200	0	running	124	$18,000
14	7	92	Jimmie Johnson	Herzog Motorsports	Chevrolet	199	12	running	126	$21,490
15	37	59	Rich Bickle	ST Motorsports	Chevrolet	199	0	running	118	$21,880
16	12	74	Chad Little	BACE Motorsports	Chevrolet	199	0	running	115	$17,070
17	34	18	Jeff Purvis	Joe Gibbs Racing	Pontiac	199	0	running	112	$20,960
18	38	21	Mike Dillon	Richard Childress Racing	Chevrolet	199	0	running	109	$19,850
19	15	37	Kevin Grubb	Brewco Motorsports	Chevrolet	199	4	running	111	$19,740
20	6	27	Jamie McMurray	Brewco Motorsports	Chevrolet	199	0	running	103	$20,430
21	11	71	Kevin Lepage	Matrix Motorsports	Ford	199	0	running	100	$16,520
22	22	36	Hank Parker Jr.	Cicci-Welliver Racing	Chevrolet	199	0	running	97	$24,190
23	32	38	Christian Elder	Akins Motorsports	Ford	199	0	running	94	$16,275
24	10	48	Kenny Wallace	Innovative Motorsports	Chevrolet	198	0	running	91	$19,165
25	25	25	Chad Chaffin	Team Rensi Motorsports	Chevrolet	198	0	running	88	$18,130
26	28	77	Kelly Denton	PRW Racing	Ford	198	0	running	85	$15,920
27	23	1	P. J. Jones	Phoenix Racing	Chevrolet	197	0	running	82	$23,310
28	30	66	Tim Fedewa	Cicci-Welliver Racing	Chevrolet	196	0	running	79	$24,200
29	39	63	Shane Hall	Hensley Motorsports	Ford	194	0	running	76	$18,590
30	5	46	Ashton Lewis Jr.	Lewis Motorsports	Chevrolet	191	0	crash	73	$15,580
31	19	14	Larry Foyt	A. J. Foyt Enterprises	Chevrolet	190	0	crash	70	$15,370
32	17	55	Mark Green	ST Motorsports	Ford	187	0	vibration	67	$16,260
33	42	49	Brian Tyler	Jay Robinson Racing	Chevrolet	185	0	running	64	$15,150
34	1	17	Matt Kenseth	Reiser Enterprises	Chevrolet	182	32	running	66	$21,740
35	40	28	Brad Baker	Brewco Motorsports	Chevrolet	181	0	running	58	$14,930
36	18	11	Marty Houston	HighLine Performance Group	Chevrolet	152	0	crash	55	$14,895
37	4	26	Bobby Hamilton Jr.	Carroll Racing	Chevrolet	122	0	overheating	52	$17,860
38	24	7	Randy LaJoie	Evans Motorsports	Chevrolet	103	0	engine	49	$20,325
39	33	99	Michael Waltrip	Michael Waltrip Racing	Chevrolet	97	0	crash	46	$14,790
40	27	34	David Green	Cicci-Welliver Racing	Chevrolet	59	0	engine	43	$17,755
41	41	16	Sammy Sanders	Day Enterprise Racing	Pontiac	22	0	ignition	40	$14,720
42	43	52	Scott Gaylord	Means Racing	Ford	15	0	engine	37	$14,685
43	36	8	Blaise Alexander	HighLine Performance Group	Chevrolet	5	0	crash	34	$14,650
Official race results

Previous race: 2001 Alltel 200	NASCAR Busch Series; 2001 season	Next race: 2001 Aaron's 312
