= 2001 NAPA Auto Parts 300 =

Race details
- Race 1 of 33 in the 2001 NASCAR Busch Series season
- Date: February 17, 2001
- Location: Daytona International Speedway, Daytona Beach, Florida
- Course: Permanent racing facility
- Course length: 2.5 miles (4.023 km)
- Distance: 120 laps, 300 mi (482.803 km)
- Average speed: 135.152 miles per hour (217.506 km/h)

Pole position
| Driver | Joe Nemechek | NEMCO Motorsports |
- Time: 48.137

Most laps led
| Driver | Jeff Purvis | Joe Gibbs Racing |
- Laps: 65

Winner
| No. 7 | Randy LaJoie | Evans Motorsports |

Television in the United States
- Network: FOX
- Announcers: Mike Joy, Darrell Waltrip, and Larry McReynolds

The 2001 NAPA Auto Parts 300 was the first stock car race of the 2001 NASCAR Busch Series, and the 20th iteration of the event. The race was held on Saturday, February 17, 2001, at Daytona International Speedway in Daytona Beach, Florida, a 2.5-mile (4.0-kilometre) superspeedway. The race took the scheduled 120 laps to complete. In an action-packed event, Randy LaJoie, driving for Evans Motorsports, would fend off several hard chargers to earn his fourteenth career NASCAR Busch Series win, and his first of the season. To fill out the podium, Kevin Harvick, driving for Richard Childress Racing, and Matt Kenseth, driving for Reiser Enterprises, would finish 2nd and 3rd, respectively.

== Report ==
=== Background ===
Daytona International Speedway, the track where the race will be held.

Daytona International Speedway is one of three superspeedways to hold NASCAR races, the other two being Atlanta Motor Speedway and Talladega Superspeedway. The standard track at Daytona International Speedway is a four-turn superspeedway that is 2.5 miles (4.0 km) long. The track's turns are banked at 31 degrees, while the front stretch, the location of the finish line, is banked at 18 degrees.

==== Entry list ====
- (R) denotes rookie driver.

| # | Driver | Team | Make | Sponsor |
|---|---|---|---|---|
| 00 | Todd Bodine | Buckshot Racing | Pontiac | Buckshot Racing |
| 1 | P. J. Jones | Phoenix Racing | Pontiac | Yellow Freight |
| 2 | Kevin Harvick | Richard Childress Racing | Chevrolet | AC-Delco |
| 6 | Joe Bessey | Joe Bessey Motorsports | Pontiac | Whelen |
| 7 | Randy LaJoie | Evans Motorsports | Pontiac | Kleenex / Winn-Dixie |
| 08 | Bobby Hamilton | Carroll Racing | Chevrolet | Diet Dr. Pepper |
| 8 | Blaise Alexander | HighLine Performance Group | Chevrolet | Channellock / InvenCom |
| 10 | Jeff Green | ppc Racing | Ford | Nestle Nesquik |
| 11 | Marty Houston | HighLine Performance Group | Chevrolet | Channellock |
| 14 | Larry Foyt (R) | Foyt Racing | Chevrolet | Harrah's Casino |
| 16 | David Starr | Day Enterprise Racing | Pontiac | 31-W Insulation |
| 17 | Matt Kenseth | Reiser Enterprises | Chevrolet | Visine |
| 18 | Jeff Purvis | Joe Gibbs Racing | Pontiac | MBNA |
| 19 | Mike Bliss | Emerald Performance Group | Chevrolet | MST Motorsports Safety |
| 20 | Mike McLaughlin | Joe Gibbs Racing | Pontiac | World Vision |
| 21 | Mike Dillon | Richard Childress Racing | Chevrolet | Rockwell Automation |
| 23 | Scott Wimmer (R) | Bill Davis Racing | Pontiac | Jani-King |
| 25 | Chad Chaffin | Team Rensi Motorsports | Chevrolet | United States Marine Corps |
| 26 | Bobby Hamilton Jr. | Carroll Racing | Chevrolet | Dr. Pepper |
| 27 | Jamie McMurray (R) | Brewco Motorsports | Pontiac | Williams Travel Centers |
| 28 | Brad Baker | Brewco Motorsports | Chevrolet | Vanderbilt |
| 33 | Tony Raines | BACE Motorsports | Chevrolet | Bayer |
| 34 | David Green | Cicci-Welliver Racing | Chevrolet | AFG Glass |
| 35 | Lyndon Amick | Team Amick | Pontiac | Team Amick |
| 36 | Hank Parker Jr. | Cicci-Welliver Racing | Chevrolet | GNC Live Well |
| 37 | Kevin Grubb | Brewco Motorsports | Chevrolet | Timber Wolf |
| 38 | Christian Elder | Akins Motorsports | Ford | Great Clips |
| 43 | Jay Sauter | Curb Agajanian Motorsports | Chevrolet | Quality Farm Stores |
| 45 | Steve Grissom | Petty Enterprises | Chevrolet | Richard Petty Driving Experience |
| 46 | Ashton Lewis | Lewis Motorsports | Chevrolet | Lewis Motorsports |
| 48 | Kenny Wallace | Innovative Motorsports | Chevrolet | Goulds Pumps |
| 49 | Andy Kirby | Jay Robinson Racing | Chevrolet | Bob Williams Used Car Factory |
| 55 | Mark Green | Davis & Weight Motorsports | Ford | MSN |
| 57 | Jason Keller | ppc Racing | Ford | Albertsons |
| 59 | Rich Bickle | ST Motorsports | Chevrolet | Kingsford / Glad |
| 60 | Greg Biffle (R) | Roush Racing | Ford | Grainger |
| 61 | Tim Sauter (R) | Xpress Motorsports | Pontiac | Stoops Freightliner |
| 63 | Shane Hall | Hensley Motorsports | Ford | Lance Inc. |
| 66 | Tim Fedewa | Cicci-Welliver Racing | Chevrolet | Phillips 66 |
| 74 | Chad Little | BACE Motorsports | Chevrolet | Staff America |
| 77 | Kelly Denton (R) | PRW Racing | Ford | Merck-Medco |
| 87 | Joe Nemechek | NEMCO Motorsports | Pontiac | Cellular One |
| 92 | Jimmie Johnson | Herzog Motorsports | Chevrolet | Excedrin |
| 98 | Elton Sawyer | Akins Motorsports | Ford | Hot Tamales / Starter |
| 99 | Michael Waltrip | Michael Waltrip Racing | Chevrolet | Aaron's |
Official entry list

== Practice ==
=== First practice ===
The first practice session was held on Tuesday, February 13, at 9:20 am EST, and would last for 100 minutes. Kevin Grubb, driving for Brewco Motorsports, would set the fastest time in the session, with a lap of 48.944, and a speed of 183.884 mph (295.933 km/h).

| Pos. | # | Driver | Team | Make | Time | Speed |
|---|---|---|---|---|---|---|
| 1 | 37 | Kevin Grubb | Brewco Motorsports | Chevrolet | 48.944 | 183.884 |
| 2 | 35 | Lyndon Amick | Team Amick | Chevrolet | 48.959 | 183.827 |
| 3 | 26 | Bobby Hamilton Jr. | Carroll Racing | Chevrolet | 49.070 | 183.411 |
First practice results

== Results ==
| Pos | Grid | Car No. | Driver | Team | Manufacturer | Laps | Laps Led | Time/Retired |
|---|---|---|---|---|---|---|---|---|
| 1 | 2 | 7 | Randy LaJoie | Evans Motorsports | Pontiac | 120 | 12 | Winner |
| 2 | 12 | 2 | Kevin Harvick | Richard Childress Racing | Chevrolet | 120 | 0 | Lead lap under caution |
| 3 | 18 | 17 | Matt Kenseth | Reiser Enterprises | Chevrolet | 120 | 0 | Lead lap under caution |
| 4 | 14 | 10 | Jeff Green | ppc Racing | Ford | 120 | 1 | Lead lap under caution |
| 5 | 34 | 92 | Jimmie Johnson | Herzog Motorsports | Chevrolet | 120 | 0 | Lead lap under caution |
| 6 | 16 | 20 | Mike McLaughlin | Joe Gibbs Racing | Pontiac | 120 | 0 | Lead lap under caution |
| 7 | 19 | 57 | Jason Keller | ppc Racing | Ford | 120 | 0 | Lead lap under caution |
| 8 | 20 | 48 | Kenny Wallace | Innovative Motorsports | Chevrolet | 120 | 0 | Lead lap under caution |
| 9 | 32 | 74 | Chad Little | BACE Motorsports | Chevrolet | 120 | 0 | Lead lap under caution |
| 10 | 7 | 61 | Tim Sauter | Xpress Motorsports | Pontiac | 120 | 0 | Lead lap under caution |
| 11 | 6 | 27 | Jamie McMurray | Brewco Motorsports | Pontiac | 120 | 0 | Lead lap under caution |
| 12 | 41 | 63 | Shane Hall | Hensley Motorsports | Ford | 120 | 0 | Lead lap under caution |
| 13 | 30 | 11 | Marty Houston | Fitz Motorsports | Chevrolet | 120 | 0 | Lead lap under caution |
| 14 | 39 | 36 | Hank Parker Jr. | Cicci-Welliver Racing | Chevrolet | 120 | 0 | Lead lap under caution |
| 15 | 5 | 23 | Scott Wimmer | Bill Davis Racing | Pontiac | 120 | 24 | Lead lap under caution |
| 16 | 27 | 59 | Rich Bickle | ST Motorsports | Chevrolet | 120 | 0 | Lead lap under caution |
| 17 | 11 | 6 | Joe Bessey | Joe Bessey Motorsports | Pontiac | 120 | 0 | Lead lap under caution |
| 18 | 42 | 77 | Kelly Denton | PRW Racing | Ford | 120 | 0 | Lead lap under caution |
| 19 | 36 | 44 | Larry Foyt | A. J. Foyt Racing | Chevrolet | 120 | 1 | Lead lap under caution |
| 20 | 31 | 55 | Mark Green | HMV Motorsports | Ford | 120 | 0 | Lead lap under caution |
| 21 | 10 | 35 | Lyndon Amick | Team Amick | Pontiac | 120 | 0 | Lead lap under caution |
| 22 | 24 | 60 | Greg Biffle | Roush Racing | Ford | 120 | 2 | Lead lap under caution |
| 23 | 38 | 34 | David Green | Cicci-Welliver Racing | Chevrolet | 120 | 0 | Lead lap under caution |
| 24 | 35 | 66 | Tim Fedewa | Cicci-Welliver Racing | Chevrolet | 120 | 0 | Lead lap under caution |
| 25 | 13 | 43 | Jay Sauter | Curb/Agajanian Motorsports | Chevrolet | 120 | 0 | Lead lap under caution |
| 26 | 21 | 45 | Steve Grissom | Petty Enterprises | Chevrolet | 120 | 0 | Lead lap under caution |
| 27 | 3 | 1 | P. J. Jones | Phoenix Racing | Pontiac | 120 | 0 | Lead lap under caution |
| 28 | 4 | 18 | Jeff Purvis | Joe Gibbs Racing | Pontiac | 120 | 65 | Lead lap under caution |
| 29 | 8 | 21 | Mike Dillon | Richard Childress Racing | Chevrolet | 119 | 0 | +1 lap |
| 30 | 26 | 8 | Blaise Alexander | HighLine Performance Group | Chevrolet | 119 | 0 | +1 lap |
| 31 | 29 | 46 | Ashton Lewis | Lewis Motorsports | Chevrolet | 119 | 0 | +1 lap |
| 32 | 1 | 87 | Joe Nemechek | NEMCO Motorsports | Pontiac | 119 | 15 | +1 lap |
| 33 | 15 | 26 | Bobby Hamilton Jr. | Carroll Racing | Chevrolet | 118 | 0 | +2 laps |
| 34 | 23 | 16 | David Starr | Day Enterprise Racing | Pontiac | 111 | 0 | +9 laps |
| 35 | 33 | 28 | Brad Baker | Brewco Motorsports | Chevrolet | 105 | 0 | +15 laps |
| 36 | 40 | 33 | Tony Raines | BACE Motorsports | Chevrolet | 100 | 0 | Crash |
| 37 | 28 | 99 | Michael Waltrip | Michael Waltrip Racing | Chevrolet | 100 | 0 | Engine |
| 38 | 17 | 00 | Todd Bodine | Buckshot Racing | Pontiac | 85 | 0 | Crash |
| 39 | 9 | 37 | Kevin Grubb | Brewco Motorsports | Pontiac | 83 | 0 | Crash |
| 40 | 43 | 19 | Mike Bliss | Emerald Performance Group | Chevrolet | 82 | 0 | Engine |
| 41 | 37 | 25 | Chad Chaffin | Team Rensi Motorsports | Chevrolet | 58 | 0 | Crash |
| 42 | 22 | 08 | Bobby Hamilton | Carroll Racing | Chevrolet | 56 | 0 | Rear end |
| 43 | 25 | 98 | Elton Sawyer | Akins Motorsports | Ford | 6 | 0 | Engine |
Failed to qualify
| | | 38 | Christian Elder | Akins Motorsports | Ford | | | |
| | | 49 | Andy Kirby | Jay Robinson Racing | Chevrolet | | | |
| | | 74 | Phil Parsons | BACE Motorsports | Chevrolet | | | |

== Media ==
=== Television ===
The NAPA Auto Parts 300 was carried by FOX in the United States. Mike Joy, former Cup Series champion Darrell Waltrip, and former Daytona 500 winner race crew chief Larry McReynolds called the race from the booth, with Steve Byrnes, Jeanne Zelasko, Dick Berggren and Matt Yocum covering pit road. Chris Myers hosted the show and there was also contributions from Jeff Hammond and Ken Squier. It was the first NASCAR Busch Series race broadcast on FOX as part of the new for 2001 TV contracts.

FOX
| Booth announcers | Pit reporters |
|---|---|
| Lap-by-lap: Mike Joy Color-commentator: Darrell Waltrip Color-commentator: Larry McReynolds | Steve Byrnes Jeanne Zelasko Matt Yocum Dick Berggren |
