= Marty Houston =

American racing driver (born 1968)

- Born: January 7, 1968 (age 58); Hickory, North Carolina, U.S.
- Achievements: 1997 Hickory Motor Speedway Track Champion

NASCAR O'Reilly Auto Parts Series career
- 19 races run over 2 years
- Best finish: 37th (2001)
- First race: 2000 Sam's Club 200 (Rockingham)
- Last race: 2001 Outback Steakhouse 300 (Kentucky)
Wins	Top tens	Poles
0	0	0

NASCAR FedEx Freight Truck Series career
- 44 races run over 3 years
- Best finish: 12th (2000)
- First race: 1999 NAPA 300K (Pikes Peak)
- Last race: 2003 Ford 200 (Homestead)
Wins	Top tens	Poles
0	11	0
- Statistics up to date as of July 10, 2012.

Marty Houston (born January 7, 1968, in Hickory, North Carolina) is an American former NASCAR driver. His younger brother, Andy and father Tommy Houston have driven in NASCAR as well.

== Racing career ==
=== Craftsman Truck Series ===
Houston made his debut seven races into the 1999 Craftsman Truck Series season, replacing Lonnie Rush in the famed No. 75 Spears Motorsports Chevy. His first race was at Pikes Peak, where he easily made it into the race with a 13th place starting effort, but his engine blew up and finished 29th midway into the race. Houston could only manage one top-ten in 1999, a sixth at Nazareth, although he did have ten top-20s in nineteen starts.

Despite the struggles in 1999, Houston was invited back for 2000, and Houston made the most of it. Houston came out of the gates leading two laps at the season opener at Daytona and was running in the top-ten when he got caught up in "The Big One." Yet, Houston finished tenth the next race, which proved to be one of ten times in 2000 he would finish in the top-ten. The best was his eventual career best fourth at Kentucky, where he also earned his best career start of third. (He also started third at Phoenix) Perhaps most impressively was his average finish of 14.4. His worst position in 2000 was a pair of 25th-place runs, and finished 12th in points. Houston was noticed by Armando Fitz and got a new ride in the Busch Series for 2001, leaving the No. 75.

Houston did eventually make one more start in 2003, but that was clouded in controversy. Driving a fifth Ultra Motorsports Dodge in the season ending Ford 200, Houston started 18th and was running on the lead lap when he got loose in Turn 4 on Lap 100. He came down and slammed Brendan Gaughan, who was leading the points standings going into the race and who could've been overtaken by Houston's teammate Ted Musgrave for the championship. The wreck cost Gaughan the series championship and many Gaughan fans felt that Houston had intentionally wrecked Gaughan, though the team emphatically denied it. Gaughan himself was not happy about the wreck, specifically criticizing the fact that Houston was in the race and that Ultra Motorsports had fielded so many trucks in the race.

=== Busch Series ===
Houston, while driving for Spears Motorsports in 2000, agreed to drive the No. 82 Channellock Chevy in the late stages of the season for Felix Sabates. Houston made his series debut at Rockingham, qualifying in 36th and finished 28th. He had a 32nd at Phoenix, and a 14th-place finish at Homestead.

Sabates sold his team to Armando Fitz in early 2001. He started off with an eventual career-best finish of 13th at Daytona. From there, Houston's season went downhill. In 16 starts, the rookie Houston did not finish five times. In addition, Houston only had four top-20 finishes. Houston had been steadily improving though, as 2001 hit mid-season, but Fitz was not satisfied and Houston was released from the team in favor of Ron Hornaday.

== Post-racing career ==
In 2002, Houston had been working on the No. 2 Ultra Motorsports Dodge for three years as tire changer. After the team closed in 2005, Houston went to work as a tire changer for Morgan-Dollar Motorsports on Kraig Kinser's crew.

== Motorsports career results ==
=== NASCAR ===
(key) (Bold – Pole position awarded by qualifying time. Italics – Pole position earned by points standings or practice time. * – Most laps led.

==== Busch Series ====
NASCAR Busch Series results
Year	Team	No.	Make	1	2	3	4	5	6	7	8	9	10	11	12	13	14	15	16	17	18	19	20	21	22	23	24	25	26	27	28	29	30	31	32	33	NBSC	Pts	Ref
2000	SABCO Racing	82	Chevy	DAY	CAR	LVS	ATL	DAR	BRI	TEX	NSV	TAL	CAL	RCH	NHA	CLT	DOV	SBO	MYB	GLN	MLW	NZH	PPR	GTY	IRP	MCH	BRI	DAR	RCH	DOV	CLT	CAR; 28	MEM	PHO; 32	HOM; 14		75th	267	
2001	Fitz Motorsports	11	Chevy	DAY; 13	CAR; 42	LVS; 36	ATL; 33	DAR; 20	BRI; 14	TEX; 25	NSH; 23	TAL; 37	CAL; 32	RCH; 38	NHA; 30	NZH; 25	CLT; 32	DOV; 17	KEN; 21	MLW	GLN	CHI	GTY	PPR	IRP	MCH	BRI	DAR	RCH	DOV	KAN	CLT	MEM	PHO	CAR	HOM	37th	1294	

==== Craftsman Truck Series ====
NASCAR Craftsman Truck Series results
Year	Team	No.	Make	1	2	3	4	5	6	7	8	9	10	11	12	13	14	15	16	17	18	19	20	21	22	23	24	25	NCTC	Pts	Ref
1999	Spears Motorsports	75	Chevy	HOM	PHO	EVG	MMR	MAR	MEM	PPR; 29	I70; 26	BRI; 23	TEX; 26	PIR; 12	GLN; 21	MLW; 23	NSV; 13	NZH; 6	MCH; 21	NHA; 21	IRP; 20	GTY; 32	HPT; 20	RCH; 20	LVS; 13	LVL; 20	TEX; 17	CAL; 20	23rd	1958	
2000	Spears Motorsports	75	Chevy	DAY; 18	HOM; 10	PHO; 21	MMR; 22	MAR; 19	PIR; 9	GTY; 25	MEM; 17	PPR; 10	EVG; 25	TEX; 7	KEN; 4	GLN; 17	MLW; 6	NHA; 10	NZH; 19	MCH; 8	IRP; 13	NSV; 18	CIC; 20	RCH; 14	DOV; 7	TEX; 19	CAL; 8		12th	2942	
2003	Ultra Motorsports	10	Dodge	DAY	DAR	MMR	MAR	CLT	DOV	TEX	MEM	MLW	KAN	KEN	GTW	MCH	IRP	NSH	BRI	RCH	NHA	CAL	LVS	SBO	TEX	MAR	PHO	HOM; 30	121st	73	

==== Winston West Series ====
NASCAR Winston West Series results
Year	Team	No.	Make	1	2	3	4	5	6	7	8	9	10	11	12	NWCC	Pts	Ref
2000	Spears Motorsports	75	Chevy	PHO	MMR; 9	LVS	CAL	LAG	IRW	POR	EVG	IRW	RMR	MMR	IRW	51st	138	

==== Goody's Dash Series ====
NASCAR Goody's Dash Series results
Year	Team	No.	Make	1	2	3	4	5	6	7	8	9	10	11	12	13	14	15	16	17	18	19	20	21	NGDS	Pts	Ref
1997	N/A	3	Toyota	DAY; DNQ	HOM	KIN	MYB	LAN	CAR	TRI	FLO	HCY	BRI	GRE	SNM	CLT	MYB	LAN	SUM	STA	HCY	USA	CON	HOM	96th	19	
1998	N/A	11	Ford	DAY	HCY	CAR	CLT	TRI	LAN	BRI	SUM	GRE	ROU	SNM	MYB	CON	HCY; 18	LAN	STA	LOU	VOL	USA	HOM		79th	109	
