= Buschwhacker =

Term for top tier NASCAR drivers who compete in lower tier division races

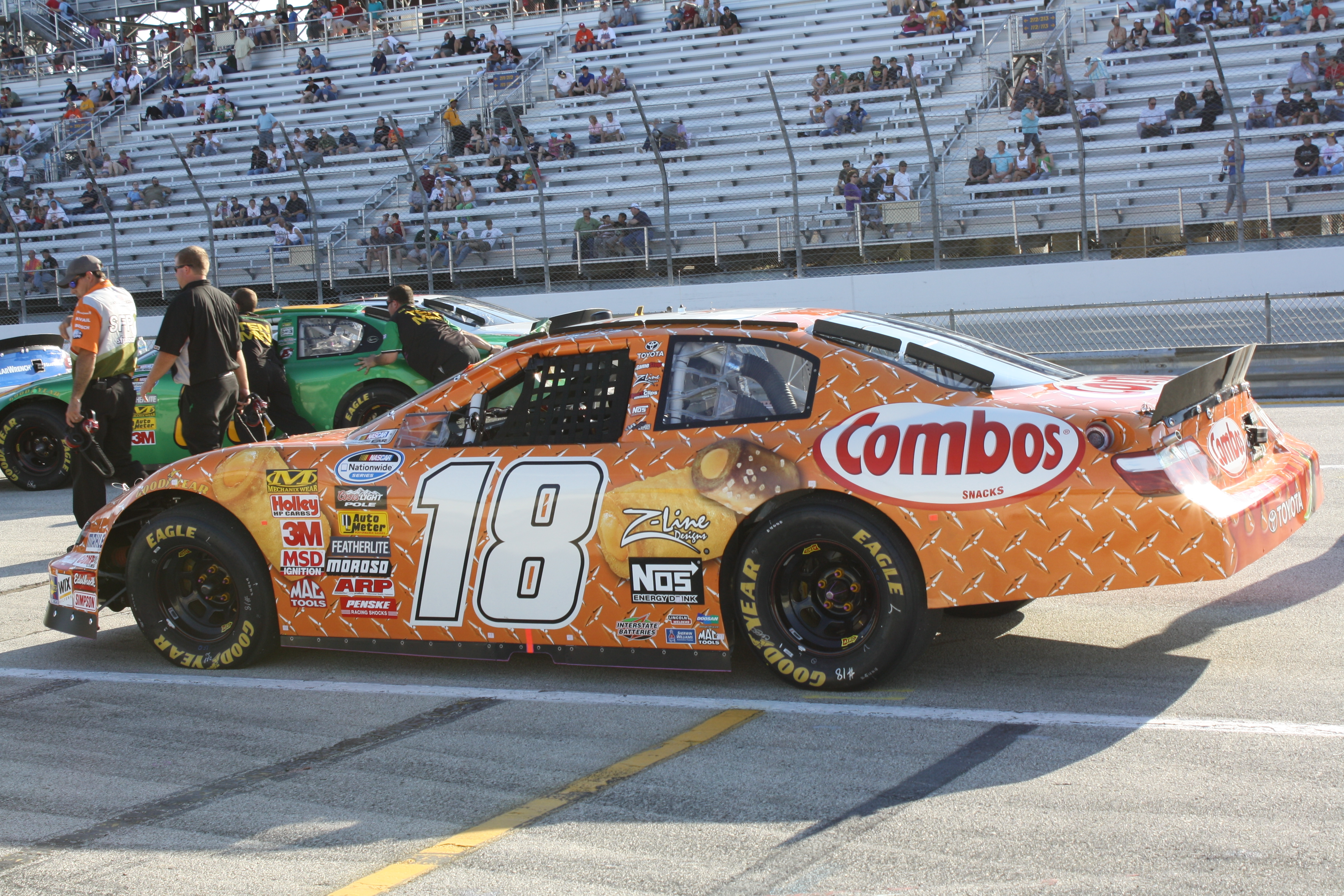
2009 Nationwide Series car of Cup Series regular Kyle Busch, who won the Nationwide Series championship that year and holds the record for most wins in the Nationwide Series

Buschwhacker (alternatively spelled Buschwacker) is a term for NASCAR drivers who are regulars in the top-level NASCAR Cup Series but who also compete on a regular basis in the second-tier O'Reilly Auto Parts Series. The original coinage of the term "Buschwhacker" refers to Anheuser-Busch's longtime title sponsorship of the second-tier series through their Busch beer brand.

The practice is controversial due to Cup drivers, such as Kyle Busch, Mark Martin, Kevin Harvick (numbers one, two, and three all time in wins in the Xfinity Series), Darrell Waltrip, and Dale Earnhardt, entering a large portion of races over the course of the season and dominating the races in superior equipment, taking good finishes, competitive rides and sponsorship, and exposure away from both development drivers and veterans who are regulars in the series. Many NASCAR experts, however, contend that without Cup drivers and the large amount of fan interest and sponsorship they attract, the series would cease to exist.

Due to NASCAR rules changes that took effect in 2011, drivers must now select one of the top three touring series and be eligible for the driver points championship in that class only. This prevents Cup Series regulars from also competing for points in the lower series. Before these changes, the last series regular to win the Nationwide Series points title was Martin Truex Jr., winning in 2004 and 2005. Despite these changes, Cup drivers continued their dominance by shifting their focus to winning the owners' championship (from 2011 to 2015, the owner's championships were won by Cup-affiliated teams whose cars were driven in majority by Cup drivers), until NASCAR further curbed down on the practice by limiting how many Cup drivers can start lower series races per year.

== The practice ==
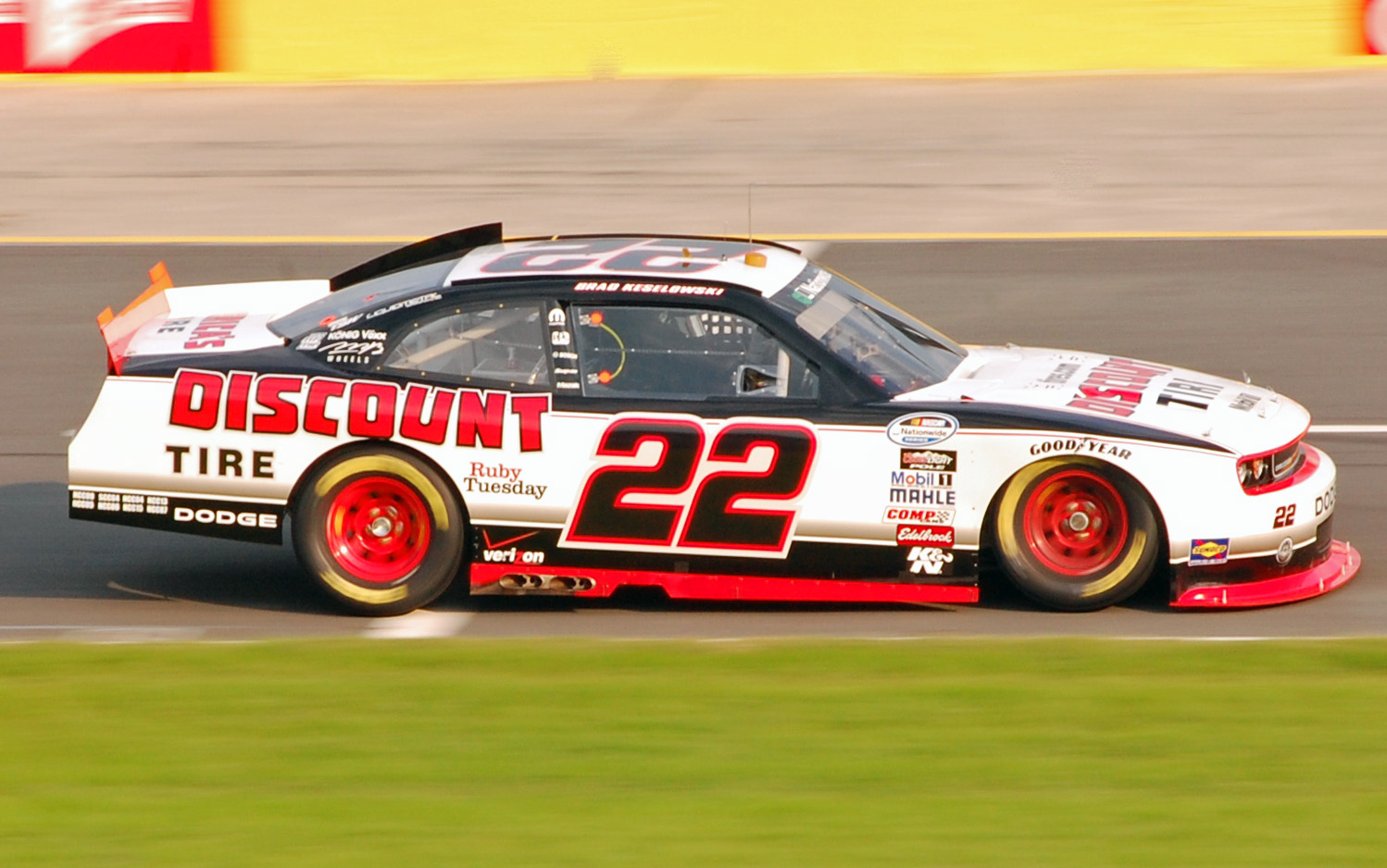
The No. 22 Discount Tire Dodge of Team Penske, driven primarily by Cup Series regular Brad Keselowski.

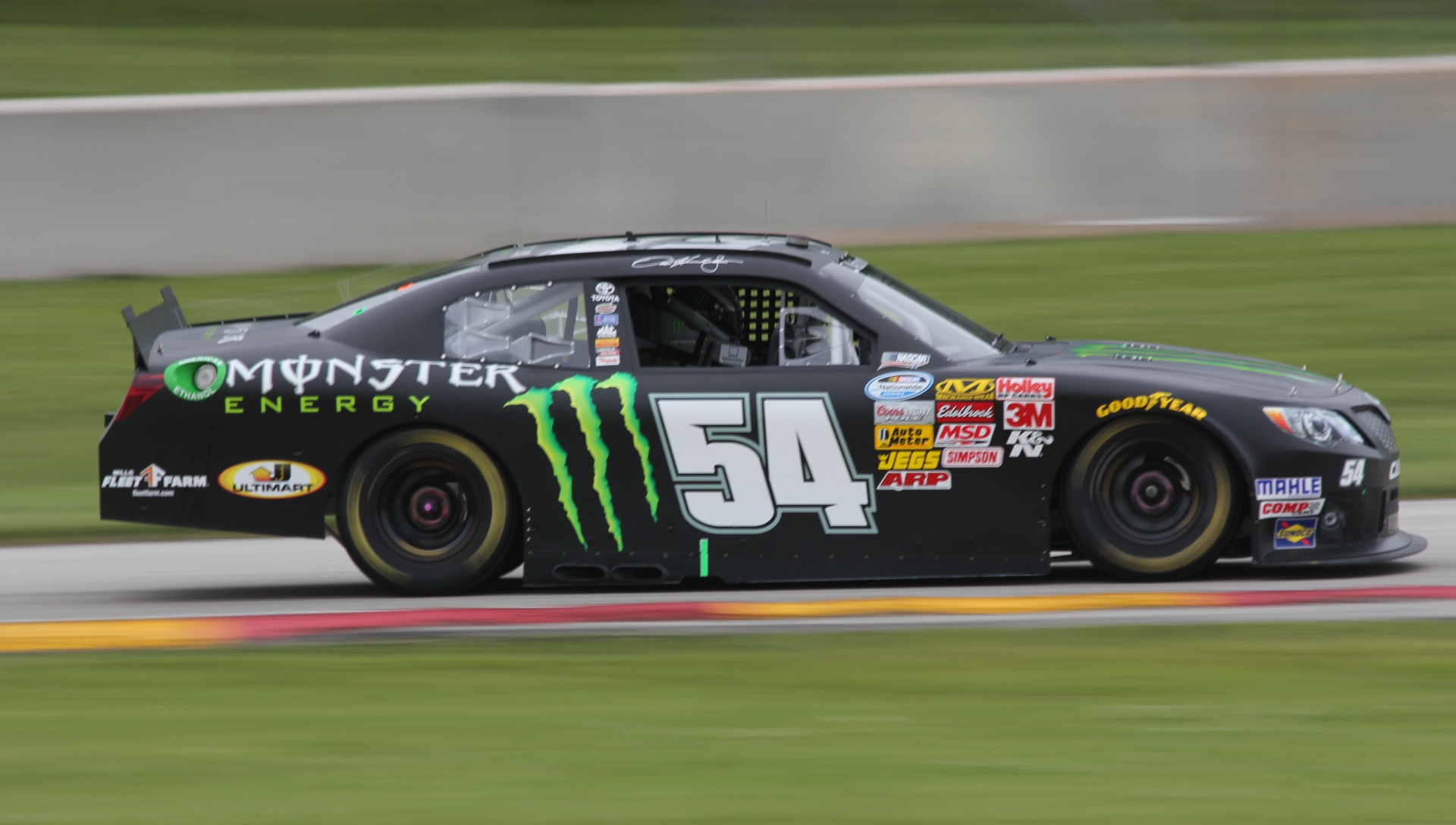
The No. 54 Monster Energy Toyota of Joe Gibbs Racing, primarily driven by Kyle Busch.

The two entries have finished 1–2 in the owners' standings in 2013, 2014, and 2015. Each car earned 12 wins in 2013, 6 and 8 respectively in 2014, and 7 each in 2015 despite Busch's injury. Keselowski and Busch are among the most notable Buschwhackers.

The primary advantage of running both Cup and Xfinity Series races is extra practice ("seat time") for the drivers. Xfinity races are often run as support races a day prior to Cup Series races, and use similar equipment, though Xfinity cars have less horsepower than Cup cars. Some racing experts suggested that when the Cup series transitioned to the safety-oriented Car of Tomorrow in 2007, the advantage of Cup drivers racing in these events would decrease greatly due to differences in the designs of the vehicles. However, this did not decrease the presence of Cup drivers in the series, as each Xfinity Series (then known as the Nationwide Series) drivers' title from 2006 to 2010 was won by a Cup Series regular. The aerodynamic differences between the two series were greatly reduced when the Nationwide Series implemented its own Car of Tomorrow on a part-time basis in 2010 and full-time the following year.

The practice is also seen in the third-tier Craftsman Truck Series, particularly by Kyle Busch (who formally operated his own team Kyle Busch Motorsports, in the Truck Series), and Kevin Harvick (who formerly operated Kevin Harvick Incorporated from 2002 to 2012). Busch's #51 truck won the owner's championship in 2013, with Busch running 11 of the 22 races and scoring 5 wins, and again in 2014, where Busch won 7 out of the 10 races he participated in. Cup drivers occasionally dabble in NASCAR's regional series, such as Ryan Newman running select Whelen Modified Tour events for Kevin Manion and Mike Curb, the sister ARCA Racing Series, and local dirt and short track events.

The presence of Buschwhackers is seen as problematic by some regulars in the lower series, who complain about more accomplished Cup drivers taking the top prize money and thus leading to loss of sponsorship for their efforts. Cup drivers often run in cars fielded by or affiliated with their Cup Series teams, giving them superior equipment and increased resources. The presence of the Cup teams have driven up the costs of competition, forcing many independent Xfinity Series teams to shut their doors. Many sponsors are hesitant to put financial backing behind an unproven driver, insisting that Cup drivers run in at least part of the schedule, which has led to several incidents of young drivers receiving part-time schedules or being pulled from an entry before (or even during) a race in favor of a Cup driver. In 2010, for example, Kelly Bires was forced to sit out the Daytona season opener due to contractual obligations with JR Motorsports' sponsor Unilever stating that Dale Earnhardt Jr. drive a certain number of races for the team. Other criticisms of "buschwacking" cite the lack of Xfinity Series veterans left in the series. Long-time series regulars and champions (such as Steve Grissom, David Green, Randy LaJoie, Jason Keller, Casey Atwood, and Ashton Lewis Jr.) have seen their exit from the series in the 2000s, while 2000 champion Jeff Green has driven primarily in start and park entries since 2011.

While Cup drivers attract fans to the lower-tier series, many fans are turned off by the dominance of the senior circuit competitors over their junior league competitors, with Cup drivers often winning over half of the races in a season. Comparisons have been drawn to a top-tier Major League Baseball player competing against minor-leaguers, or adults competing against children. Some drivers, including Dale Earnhardt Jr., have also been critical of the dominance of Cup competitors. (During the 2017 Xfinity Series season, Earnhardt's four full-time Xfinity teams were driven by Xfinity regulars, and Cup drivers ran a fifth car in only four races.) Many fans, as well as longtime series regular Kenny Wallace, also note the increased focus given to Cup drivers during the broadcast and promotion of the races. This changed beginning in 2012, when NASCAR produced several commercials promoting up-and-coming series regulars.

In spite of the negatives of the practice, the presence of NASCAR's top-level drivers attracts sponsorship to the lower series that may not be there without them, adds credibility to the series, and makes it easier for tracks to promote races. Many series regulars have also pointed out that the presence of Cup regulars allows them to improve their own driving styles and compete against the best in the sport. The series does still serve its purpose for driver development, with a steady influx of successful new drivers into the Sprint Cup Series: e.g., in 2007 three of the Top 10 drivers had less than four years of Cup experience, eight of the ten had less than 10 years of Cup experience, and only one (Jeff Burton) was over 40 years of age. All eight drivers of the 2014 Sprint Cup Rookie class (Kyle Larson, Austin Dillon, Justin Allgaier, Cole Whitt, Alex Bowman, Michael Annett, Ryan Truex, Parker Kligerman) had significant experience in the Nationwide Series, with six of them running at least one full season. The series also continues to provide an outlet for former Cup drivers (such as Elliott Sadler, Regan Smith, Sam Hornish Jr., and John Hunter Nemechek) to rebuild their careers, or as a way to race a limited schedule in semi-retirement (as practiced by Dale Earnhardt Jr.), as does the Truck Series for drivers such as Ron Hornaday Jr. and Johnny Sauter.

Cup crew chiefs have also been developed from this level. Kyle Busch often uses a developmental crew chief in most of his wins; Dave Rogers and Adam Stevens, two of the current Joe Gibbs Racing crew chiefs at the Sprint Cup level, both used the Xfinity level to move up. Greg Ives was the 2014 Xfinity Series champion crew chief with Chase Elliott before being called up to the Sprint Cup level in 2015 to be Dale Earnhardt Jr.'s crew chief. In some cases, a Cup driver will use a developmental engineer or crew chief, and an Xfinity regular may use an experienced Cup-level engineer.

== History ==
Although one of the original purposes of the second-tier series was for driver development, Cup Series drivers have been moonlighting in the series since its inception in 1982 (as the Budweiser Late Model Sportsman Series), when Winston Cup Champion Dale Earnhardt won the series' inaugural event at Daytona International Speedway. Prior to the year 2000, Cup drivers would often limit their schedules in the Busch Series, partially because the majority of the races were held at separate venues from the Cup Series. Two of the most notable drivers to frequent the second-tier series, Mark Martin and Harry Gant, have never run more than 17 Busch series races during any single season in their career except for Martin's 1987 season. In the past, Cup drivers had also run in equipment independent from Cup Series teams; drivers Michael Waltrip and Joe Nemechek for example fielded their own race teams in the then-Busch Series for many years. The presence of veteran Cup drivers helped to develop several future Cup Series regulars, including Jeff Gordon, Bobby Labonte, and Jeff Burton.

When Kevin Harvick was unexpectedly promoted to the Cup Series in 2001 as a result of the death of Dale Earnhardt, Harvick continued to compete in every Busch Series race that season, winning the Cup Series Rookie of the Year and Busch Series championship simultaneously that year.

In 2003, Richard Childress Racing set out to win the Busch Series Owner's Championship with their 21 car sponsored by The Hershey Company's PayDay brand. Cup driver Kevin Harvick was tabbed to drive 15 of the 34 races, with development driver Johnny Sauter filling out the rest of the schedule. Harvick ended up running 19 races, with three wins and top tens in all but one race, and RCR became the first team to win an owner's points title with two different drivers. Since then, the presence of Cup drivers and teams has increased; RCR, in 2007, for example continued to run the 21 with Harvick as well as a full-time 29 car with Jeff Burton for the owner's championship, while the 2 car with Clint Bowyer won the driver's championship in 2008. Several other non-rookie Cup Series drivers, including Greg Biffle, Carl Edwards, J. J. Yeley, Denny Hamlin, and Reed Sorenson, began running the entire Nationwide schedule while also competing in a full season of Sprint Cup, even though on some weekends the two series competed at venues hundreds of miles apart.

In 2006, only two non-Cup Series regulars won a race during the 35-race schedule: David Gilliland and Paul Menard. Menard and Johnny Sauter were the only Busch Series regulars to finish in the top-10 in points that season. In 2007, only three Busch drivers scored a victory: Aric Almirola, Stephen Leicht and Jason Leffler. Almirola's victory at the Milwaukee Mile on June 23 was controversial and unusual, as Almirola was pulled from his pole-winning car after leading 42 of the first 58 laps to make room for Cup regular Denny Hamlin, due to obligations with sponsor Rockwell Automation which is headquartered in Milwaukee. Hamlin was scheduled to compete in a Cup event at Infineon Raceway the same weekend, and had several delays in his trek from California to Wisconsin. Despite the loss in track position due to the driver change, Hamlin got back to the front to take the checkered flag after 250 laps. Almirola was officially credited with the win because he made the start, but did not participate in victory celebrations.

There have been some proposals made to restrict Cup regulars' participation in the now-Xfinity Series, including increasing the purse for series regulars, not awarding championship points to such drivers, forcing Cup drivers to start at the back, or restricting the number of races a Cup driver can run in the other series. In late 2010, media reports began to indicate that NASCAR would respond to the critics of "claim jumping" by effectively splitting the difference between the two extremes of unrestricted presence of Cup drivers and none at all. It was specifically reported that in 2011, Cup drivers would be allowed to run in the Nationwide Series, but not to compete for the series championship. This rule change was confirmed by NASCAR.com in a report on January 11, 2011. Drivers are now allowed to compete for the championship in only one of NASCAR's three national touring series in a given season. The NASCAR license application form now includes a check box requiring drivers to select the series in which they wish to compete for the championship. NASCAR president and CEO Brian France officially announced this change on January 26, adding that Cup Series drivers will still be allowed to earn owner's points, but not driver's points, in the Nationwide and Truck Series.

In spite of the rule changes, between 2011 and March 2014, Nationwide Series regulars have only gone to victory lane in 28 of the 103 races run during that period. 2013 also saw Austin Dillon win the series championship without scoring a win.

On October 26, 2016, NASCAR announced plans to limit Cup participation in the lower series starting in 2017. Cup drivers with at least five years of experience in the series would be allowed to compete in up to ten Xfinity and seven Truck Series races, and are banned from racing in the final eight races of the lower series season (regular season finale and Chase/playoff races) and the Xfinity Dash 4 Cash races (as well as their Truck Series equivalent, Triple Truck Challenge; Xfinity Series regulars are also forbidden from competing in such Truck Series races). The number was further reduced to up to seven Xfinity Series races and up to five Truck Series races in 2018; additionally, in 2019, NASCAR instituted a rule that owner's playoff berth (from race wins) and playoff points can only be received if the driver of the car also earns driver points for said series. In 2020, NASCAR further reduced the number of permitted Xfinity races by Cup veterans to five races, in addition to changing the years of experience required from five to three. The new restrictions for 2018 also include an outright prohibition of full-time NASCAR Cup Series drivers from the 12 (Xfinity) or eight (Truck) protected races (the seven playoff races, the regular season finales, and the bonus money program races). NASCAR also has, on special occasions, placed race-specific restrictions on lower-series participation, such as restricting drivers to one race for the 2020 Go Bowling 235 weekend (which also meant an Xfinity or Trucks driver cannot race in the Cup race, except as a relief driver, such as in the case of Kaz Grala who relieved for Austin Dillon due to a positive COVID-19 test) and prohibiting Cup drivers from the Xfinity Chicago street race in 2023, despite it being not a bonus money or playoff race. In 2025, NASCAR removed the restriction that allowed Cup drivers from participation in lower tier series' bonus money races, a restriction that also apply to Xfinity drivers for Triple Truck Challenge races, with number of allowed starts for Cup drivers in lower series set to increase in 2026.

== Usage ==
The term originated in an argument Craig Witkowski had with another user "Tinadog" in the Usenet newsgroup rec.autos.sport.NASCAR ("rasn" for short) in May 1997. Tinadog was against Dale Earnhardt and liked Mark Martin, and Witkowski the reverse. Witkowski was especially critical of Martin using his Winston Cup team and resources to beat up on the drivers in the lower Busch Grand National Series. The old western term of "bushwhacker" was morphed into "Busch Whacker".

The term continued in use among the regulars on rasn, referring now to any driver whose primary ride is in the Cup series and cherry-picks Busch races. The term was picked up by Fox Sports broadcaster Mike Joy, who also participated in the group. After Joy used the term in his broadcasts, it was picked up by other members of the media and found its way into common use. Joy gave credit on the air with 57 laps to go in the Fox telecast of the Koolerz 300 Busch Series race at Daytona International Speedway in 2003.

Fox later discontinued the use of the term on its telecasts. This may have been done to save face among the critics of this practice, or perhaps because few of the leaders were non-Sprint Cup Series drivers anymore.

When the Busch Series became the Nationwide Series, the term "claim jumper" was coined and used by Fox broadcaster Larry McReynolds initially, as Nationwide is an insurance company. The term puns off an insurance claim and mining rights. However, the term, along with the related term "signal pirate" (referring to the act of cable television piracy or pirate decryption in reference to Xfinity's cable television services) saw little use, although some fans later used the sponsor-neutral term "Cup leech" instead.

The practice of Cup drivers who compete in Truck Series events has been referred to as "tail gating", and the drivers referred to as "tail-gators", although this usage is not common.
