= NASCAR O'Reilly Auto Parts Series at Las Vegas Motor Speedway =

NASCAR O'Reilly Auto Parts Series races at Las Vegas Motor Speedway

NASCAR O'Reilly Auto Parts Series
- Venue: Las Vegas Motor Speedway
- Location: Las Vegas, Nevada, United States

Circuit information
- Surface: Asphalt
- Length: 1.5 mi (2.4 km)
- Turns: 4

Stock car racing events in the NASCAR O'Reilly Auto Parts Series have been held at the Las Vegas Motor Speedway in Las Vegas, Nevada since the track opened in 1997.

== Spring race ==
The LiUNA!
- Corporate sponsor: Laborers' International Union of North America
- First race: 1997
- Distance: 300 miles (482.80 km)
- Laps: 200; Stages 1/2: 45 each Final stage: 110
- Previous names: Las Vegas 300 (1997); Sam's Town Las Vegas 300 (1998); Sam's Town 300 (1999–2013); Boyd Gaming 300 (2014–2020); Alsco Uniforms 300 (2021–2023)
- Most wins (driver): Mark Martin (4)
- Most wins (team): Roush Fenway Racing (6)
- Most wins (manufacturer): Chevrolet (15)

The LiUNA! is a NASCAR O'Reilly Auto Parts Series race at Las Vegas Motor Speedway in Las Vegas, Nevada that has been held since 1997. The race is held on the weekend of the NASCAR Cup Series' Pennzoil 400. The race has usually been held as one of the first five races of the season.

Kyle Larson is the defending race winner.

=== History ===
In 1997, a year after the track opened, Las Vegas Motor Speedway received a second national division date as a support to the Truck Series event.

Sam's Town Hotel and Gambling Hall was the sponsor of the event from 1998 NASCAR Busch Series to 2013. Boyd Gaming, which had been the title sponsor from 2014 to 2020.

In 2021, Alsco became the title sponsor of the race. In 2024, the Laborers' International Union of North America Local 872 (the branch of the union based in Las Vegas) became the title sponsor of the track's spring Xfinity Series race, replacing Alsco.

=== Past winners ===
| Year | Date | No. | Driver | Team | Manufacturer | Race Distance | | Race Time | Average Speed (mph) | Report | Ref |
| Year | Date | No. | Driver | Team | Manufacturer | Laps | Miles (km) | Race Time | Average Speed (mph) | Report | Ref |
|---|---|---|---|---|---|---|---|---|---|---|---|
| 1997 | March 16 | 8 | Jeff Green | Diamond Ridge Motorsports | Chevrolet | 200 | 300 (482.803) | 2:37:41 | 114.153 | Report | |
| 1998 | February 28 | 12 | Jimmy Spencer | Spencer Motor Ventures | Chevrolet | 200 | 300 (482.803) | 2:37:43 | 114.129 | Report | |
| 1999 | March 6 | 60 | Mark Martin | Roush Racing | Ford | 200 | 300 (482.803) | 2:13:57 | 134.37 | Report | |
| 2000 | March 4 | 9 | Jeff Burton | Roush Racing | Ford | 200 | 300 (482.803) | 2:13:13 | 135.118 | Report | |
| 2001 | March 3 | 00 | Todd Bodine | Buckshot Racing | Chevrolet | 200 | 300 (482.803) | 2:23:17 | 125.625 | Report | |
| 2002 | March 2 | 9 | Jeff Burton | Roush Racing | Ford | 200 | 300 (482.803) | 2:25:24 | 123.796 | Report | |
| 2003 | March 1 | 87 | Joe Nemechek | NEMCO Motorsports | Chevrolet | 200 | 300 (482.803) | 2:35:44 | 115.582 | Report | |
| 2004 | March 6 | 21 | Kevin Harvick | Richard Childress Racing | Chevrolet | 200 | 300 (482.803) | 2:27:20 | 122.172 | Report | |
| 2005 | March 12 | 9 | Mark Martin | Roush Racing | Ford | 200 | 300 (482.803) | 2:27:21 | 122.158 | Report | |
| 2006* | March 11 | 9 | Kasey Kahne | Evernham Motorsports | Dodge | 206* | 309 (497.287) | 2:28:08 | 125.158 | Report | |
| 2007* | March 10 | 29 | Jeff Burton | Richard Childress Racing | Chevrolet | 200 | 300 (482.803) | 2:52:12 | 104.53 | Report | |
| 2008 | March 1 | 5 | Mark Martin | JR Motorsports | Chevrolet | 202* | 303 (487.631) | 2:48:09 | 108.118 | Report | |
| 2009 | February 28 | 16 | Greg Biffle | Roush Fenway Racing | Ford | 209* | 313.5 (504.529) | 2:56:16 | 106.713 | Report | |
| 2010 | February 27 | 33 | Kevin Harvick | Kevin Harvick Inc. | Chevrolet | 200 | 300 (482.803) | 2:27:38 | 121.924 | Report | |
| 2011* | March 5 | 32 | Mark Martin | Turner Motorsports | Chevrolet | 200 | 300 (482.803) | 2:15:33 | 132.792 | Report | |
| 2012 | March 10 | 6 | Ricky Stenhouse Jr. | Roush Fenway Racing | Ford | 200 | 300 (482.803) | 2:21:46 | 129.969 | Report | |
| 2013 | March 9 | 12 | Sam Hornish Jr. | Penske Racing | Ford | 200 | 300 (482.803) | 2:23:54 | 125.087 | Report | |
| 2014 | March 8 | 22 | Brad Keselowski | Team Penske | Ford | 200 | 300 (482.803) | 2:16:22 | 131.997 | Report | |
| 2015 | March 7 | 33 | Austin Dillon | Richard Childress Racing | Chevrolet | 200 | 300 (482.803) | 2:22:50 | 126.021 | Report | |
| 2016 | March 5 | 18 | Kyle Busch | Joe Gibbs Racing | Toyota | 200 | 300 (482.803) | 2:03:47 | 145.415 | Report | |
| 2017 | March 11 | 12 | Joey Logano | Team Penske | Ford | 200 | 300 (482.803) | 2:31:52 | 118.525 | Report | |
| 2018 | March 3 | 42 | Kyle Larson | Chip Ganassi Racing | Chevrolet | 200 | 300 (482.803) | 2:16:29 | 131.884 | Report | |
| 2019 | March 2 | 18 | Kyle Busch | Joe Gibbs Racing | Toyota | 213* | 319.5 (514.185) | 2:35:12 | 123.518 | Report | |
| 2020 | February 22–23 | 98 | Chase Briscoe | Stewart–Haas Racing | Ford | 200 | 300 (482.803) | 2:19:44 | 128.817 | Report | |
| 2021 | March 6 | 16 | A. J. Allmendinger | Kaulig Racing | Chevrolet | 200 | 300 (482.803) | 2:38:10 | 113.804 | Report | |
| 2022 | March 5 | 54 | Ty Gibbs | Joe Gibbs Racing | Toyota | 200 | 300 (482.803) | 2:56:15 | 102.128 | Report | |
| 2023 | March 4 | 21 | Austin Hill | Richard Childress Racing | Chevrolet | 200 | 300 (482.803) | 2:11:51 | 136.519 | Report | |
| 2024 | March 2 | 20 | John Hunter Nemechek | Joe Gibbs Racing | Toyota | 200 | 300 (482.803) | 2:11:15 | 137.143 | Report | |
| 2025 | March 15 | 7 | Justin Allgaier | JR Motorsports | Chevrolet | 200 | 300 (482.803) | 2:08:30 | 140.078 | Report | |
| 2026 | March 14 | 88 | Kyle Larson | JR Motorsports | Chevrolet | 200 | 300 (482.803) | 2:34:05 | 116.820 | Report | |
| 2027 | March 20 | | | | | | | | | Report | |

- 2006, 2008, 2009, & 2019: Races extended due to NASCAR overtime.
- 2020: Race suspended on Saturday and finished on Sunday due to rain.

==== Multiple winners (drivers) ====
| # Wins | Driver | Years won |
|---|---|---|
| 4 | Mark Martin | 1999, 2005, 2008, 2011 |
| 3 | Jeff Burton | 2000, 2002, 2007 |
| 2 | Kevin Harvick | 2004, 2010 |
| 2 | Kyle Busch | 2016, 2019 |

==== Multiple winners (teams) ====
| # Wins | Team | Years won |
|---|---|---|
| 6 | Roush Fenway Racing | 1999–2000, 2002, 2005, 2009, 2012 |
| 4 | Richard Childress Racing | 2004, 2007, 2015, 2023 |
| 4 | Joe Gibbs Racing | 2016, 2019, 2022, 2024 |
| 3 | JR Motorsports | 2008, 2025, 2026 |

==== Manufacturer wins ====
| # Wins | Make | Years won |
|---|---|---|
| 15 | (United States) Chevrolet | 1997–1998, 2001, 2003–2004, 2007–2008, 2010–2011, 2015, 2018, 2021, 2023, 2025, 2026 |
| 10 | (United States) Ford | 1999–2000, 2002, 2005, 2009, 2012–2014, 2017, 2020 |
| 4 | (Japan) Toyota | 2016, 2019, 2022, 2024 |
| 1 | (United States) Dodge | 2006 |

== Fall race ==
Focused Health 302
- Corporate sponsor: Focused Health
- First race: 2018
- Distance: 301.5 miles (485.22 km)
- Laps: 201; Stages 1/2: 45 each Final stage: 111
- Previous names: DC Solar 300 (2018); Rhino Pro Truck Outfitters 300 (2019); Alsco 300 (2020); Alsco Uniforms 302 (2021–2023); Ambetter Health 302 (2024)
- Most wins (driver): Josh Berry (2)
- Most wins (team): JR Motorsports; Stewart–Haas Racing (2)
- Most wins (manufacturer): Chevrolet (6)

The Focused Health 302 is a NASCAR O'Reilly Auto Parts Series race at Las Vegas Motor Speedway in Las Vegas, Nevada that has been held since 2018. The race is held on the weekend of the NASCAR Cup Series' South Point 400.

Corey Day is the defending race winner.

=== History ===
On March 8, 2017, it was announced that Las Vegas Motor Speedway, would get a second date for each series starting in 2018. The fall Cup and Truck Series races at New Hampshire Motor Speedway were moved to Las Vegas and Kentucky Speedway's fall Xfinity Series date (which had been a standalone race for the series) was moved to Las Vegas. The new date that Las Vegas acquired from Kentucky became the final race of the regular season to replace the Overton's 300 at Chicagoland Speedway which moved to June. Due to anti-Buschwhacking rules, no drivers running for Cup Series points were permitted to race in the fall race.

In 2019, with the announcement of the track's September weekend going prime-time, the race became a Saturday night event. For 2022, the fall race received an extra lap in the process to make the race close to 302 miles with the event being 301.5 miles/201 laps in length. (This is similar to the Cup Series race at New Hampshire Motor Speedway (another SMI track), which is 301 miles in length.)

In 2024, Alsco also did not return as the title sponsor of the fall race and Ambetter (owned by the Centene Corporation) became the title sponsor of that race. Ambetter also did not return as the title sponsor of the fall race and Focused Health partnered with Las Vegas Motor Speedway.

=== Past winners ===
| Year | Date | No. | Driver | Team | Manufacturer | Race Distance | | Race Time | Average Speed (mph) | Report | Ref |
| Year | Date | No. | Driver | Team | Manufacturer | Laps | Miles (km) | Race Time | Average Speed (mph) | Report | Ref |
|---|---|---|---|---|---|---|---|---|---|---|---|
| 2018 | September 15 | 42 | Ross Chastain | Chip Ganassi Racing | Chevrolet | 200 | 300 (482.803) | 2:30:56 | 119.258 | Report | |
| 2019 | September 14 | 2 | Tyler Reddick | Richard Childress Racing | Chevrolet | 200 | 300 (482.803) | 2:10:10 | 138.234 | Report | |
| 2020 | September 26 | 98 | Chase Briscoe | Stewart–Haas Racing | Ford | 200 | 300 (482.803) | 2:20:51 | 127.796 | Report | |
| 2021 | September 25 | 1 | Josh Berry | JR Motorsports | Chevrolet | 201 | 301.5 (485.217) | 2:26:28 | 123.509 | Report | |
| 2022 | October 15 | 8 | Josh Berry | JR Motorsports | Chevrolet | 201 | 301.5 (485.217) | 2:04:14 | 145.613 | Report | |
| 2023 | October 14 | 98 | Riley Herbst | Stewart–Haas Racing | Ford | 201 | 301.5 (485.217) | 2:18:31 | 130.598 | Report | |
| 2024 | October 19 | 16 | A. J. Allmendinger | Kaulig Racing | Chevrolet | 201 | 301.5 (485.217) | 2:22:12 | 127.215 | Report | |
| 2025 | October 11 | 19 | Aric Almirola | Joe Gibbs Racing | Toyota | 201 | 301.5 (485.217) | 2:13:31 | 135.489 | Report | |
| 2026 | October 3 | 17 | Corey Day | Hendrick Motorsports | Chevrolet | 201 | 301.5 (485.217) | 2:13:38 | 135.37 | Report | |
| 2027 | October 9 | | | | | | | | | Report | |

==== Multiple winners (drivers) ====
| # Wins | Driver | Years won |
|---|---|---|
| 2 | Josh Berry | 2021–2022 |

==== Multiple winners (teams) ====
| # Wins | Team | Years won |
|---|---|---|
| 2 | Stewart–Haas Racing | 2020, 2023 |
| 2 | JR Motorsports | 2021–2022 |

==== Manufacturer wins ====
| # Wins | Make | Years won |
|---|---|---|
| 6 | (United States) Chevrolet | 2018–2019, 2021–2022, 2024, 2026 |
| 2 | (United States) Ford | 2020, 2023 |
| 1 | (Japan) Toyota | 2025 |

| Previous race: GOVX 200 | NASCAR O'Reilly Auto Parts Series; The LiUNA! | Next race: Sport Clips Haircuts VFW 200 |

| Previous race: Kansas Lottery 300 | NASCAR O'Reilly Auto Parts Series; Focused Health 302 | Next race: Blue Cross NC 300 |
