= Ashton Lewis Jr. =

American racing driver (born 1972)

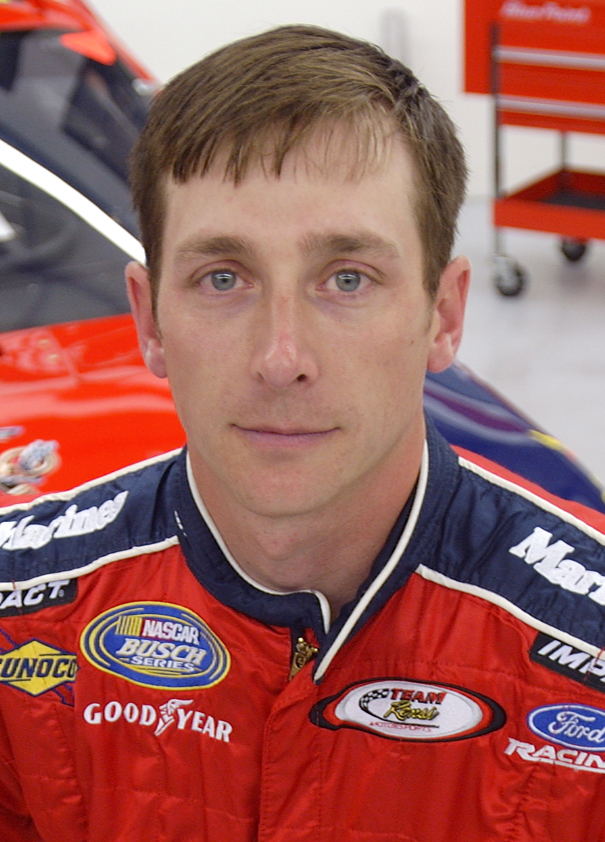
- Lewis in 2005
- Born: January 22, 1972 (age 54); Chesapeake, Virginia, U.S.

NASCAR O'Reilly Auto Parts Series career
- 226 races run over 11 years
- Best finish: 8th (2004)
- First race: 1993 Fay's 150 (Watkins Glen)
- Last race: 2006 Ford 300 (Homestead)
Wins	Top tens	Poles
0	37	1
- Statistics up to date as of May 10, 2010.

Ashton Lewis Jr. (born January 22, 1972) is an American former stock car racing driver who competed in 226 races and over 11 seasons. Lewis earned a degree in mechanical engineering from Old Dominion University in Norfolk, Virginia. After his racing career, he earned his MBA from the Fuqua School of Business at Duke University. As of March 2013, he is chief operating officer for First Team Automotive Group in Chesapeake, Virginia.

== Busch Series career ==
Lewis was a driver who was especially good on road courses. He started out in the Barber Saab Pro Series for the 1992 season. After success in that series, he was offered a scholarship to race in the British Formula Ford championship.

Lewis made his Busch debut in 1993, long before he became known to most Busch fans. Driving the No. 36 Parkway Pontiac at Watkins Glen, Lewis started the race in 29th place. The team had mechanical issues partway through the race, but Lewis got back on track and finished the race in 27th place.

Lewis returned once again to the series in 1994. This time, Lewis drove the No. 80 Commerce Bank Chevy at Milwaukee Mile. Lewis was able to top his debut with a 24th-place effort despite a 38th-place start.

Lewis again made a one-off start in 1995. He had his best weekend at that point in his career, this time back at Watkins Glen. He started the race solidly in the 22nd position and stayed on the lead lap with a 13th-place finishing result.

Lewis raced in eight races in 1996 and earned a third-place finish at Watkins Glen. He led three laps during the race, the first laps led of his Busch Series career.

Lewis did not compete in 1999 but came back in 2000, with a new family owned No. 46 Chevy. He completed an 11-race schedule with a best finish of 17th at Michigan.

With a decent first year under their belt, Lewis Motorsports ran all but one race in 2001, leading to a 20th-place standing in points. Lewis earned three top-tens in 2001: A pair of fifths at Kentucky and Charlotte and a ninth at Memphis, an impressive feat without a full-time sponsor. Lewis earned his best start of 2001 at Las Vegas, with a fifth place starting position. However, Lewis struggled to finish races and had nine DNFs.

Yet, the team was optimistic. The team would run 2002 with new sponsor Civil Air Patrol. Lewis only had one top-five, but it was a solid one. Lewis started 24th at his home track of Richmond International Raceway but certainly ran well, moving to a second-place finish. In addition, Lewis earned a triplet of eighth and another triplet of ninth. Lewis was also qualifying well, with five top-ten starts, the best being a third at IRP. The only reason that Lewis finished a lowly 17th was simple: a series-high 12 DNFs.

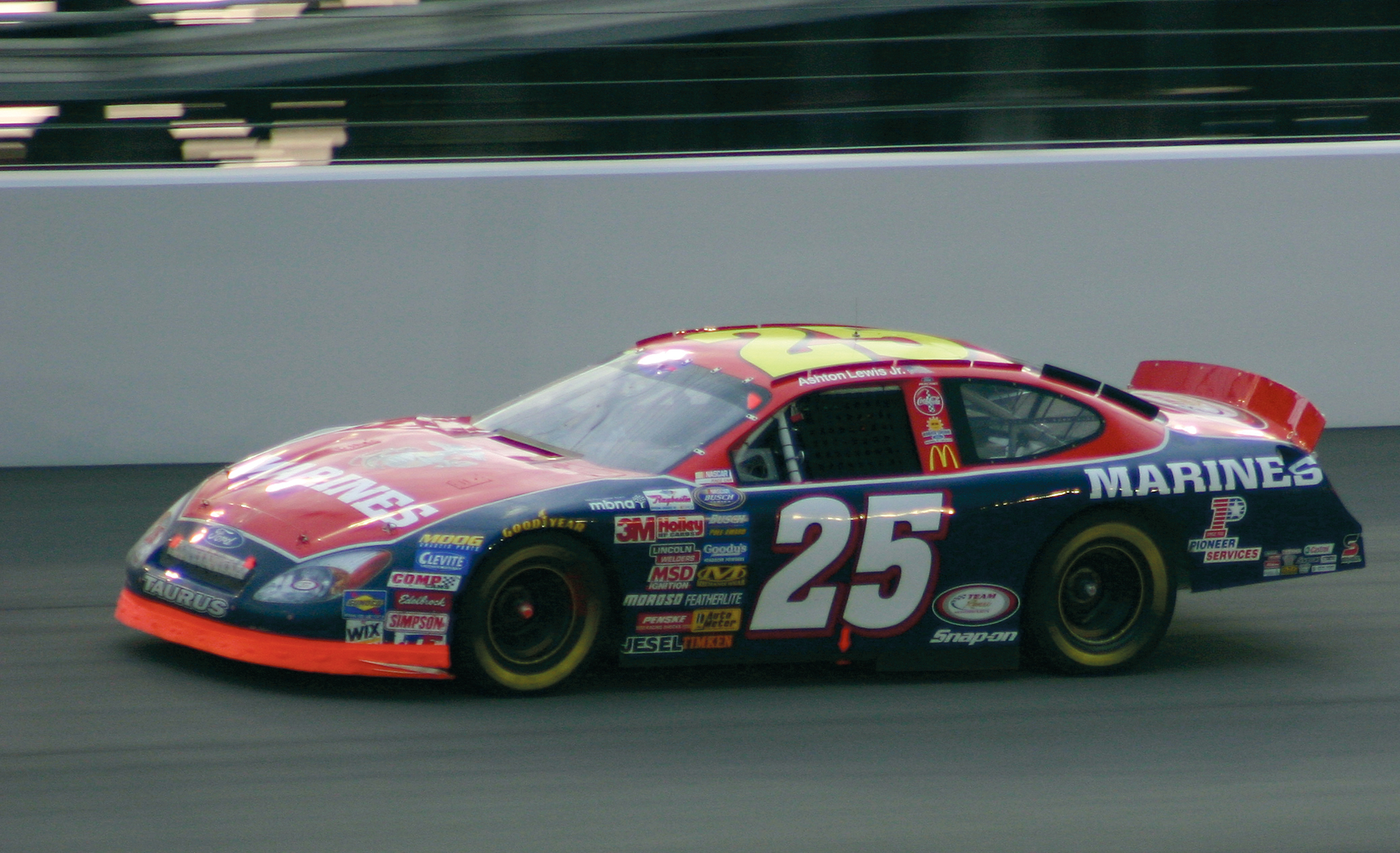
Lewis Jr. competing at Auto Club Speedway in 2005

Lewis set out to better his season in 2003 and did it well. Cutting down his DNFs to five led to a 12th-place finish in points. The highlight of his season came at Gateway. He won the pole and led forty-four laps and was running fifth when Randy Lajoie crashed in front of him and led to a 33rd-place finish. However, Lewis did have better overall finishes. He had two top-fives with a third at Nashville and a fifth at Homestead-Miami. Lewis also tacked on eight other top-ten finishes, to have ten top-ten finishes in 2003.

The team lost CAP after 2003, however, and the team could not attract a sponsor for 2004. The team would end up running the whole season, but Lewis' family team had to shut down following the season. Yet, Lewis made one great swan song at the end of the season. A late-season surge put Lewis in position to win races. That was apparent at Darlington, where Lewis ran a specially painted tribute car to a second-place finish, barely losing to Jamie McMurray. Even though there was some sadness in the team's hearts, Lewis finished eighth place in points, his first career top-ten.

Lewis would drive the No. 25 Marines Ford in 2005 and 2006 for Ed Rensi. Lewis finished the 2005 campaign 14th in points. The 2006 season yielded a disappointing 15th-place finish in points. Lewis ended his NASCAR career after the 2006 season having competed in 226 Busch Series races over 11 different seasons.

== Motorsports career results ==
=== NASCAR ===
(key) (Bold – Pole position awarded by qualifying time. Italics – Pole position earned by points standings or practice time. * – Most laps led.)

==== Busch Series ====
NASCAR Busch Series results
Year	Team	No.	Make	1	2	3	4	5	6	7	8	9	10	11	12	13	14	15	16	17	18	19	20	21	22	23	24	25	26	27	28	29	30	31	32	33	34	35	NBSC	Pts	Ref
1993		36	Pontiac	DAY	CAR	RCH	DAR	BRI	HCY	ROU	MAR	NZH	CLT	DOV	MYB	GLN; 27	MLW	TAL	IRP	MCH	NHA	BRI	DAR	RCH	DOV	ROU	CLT	MAR	CAR	HCY	ATL								97th	82	
1994	Lewis Motorsports	80	Chevy	DAY	CAR	RCH	ATL	MAR	DAR	HCY	BRI	ROU	NHA	NZH; DNQ	CLT	DOV	MYB	GLN	MLW; 24	SBO; DNQ	TAL	HCY	IRP; DNQ	MCH	BRI	DAR	RCH	DOV	CLT	MAR; DNQ	CAR								85th	91	
1995	Lewis Motorsports	80	Chevy	DAY	CAR	RCH	ATL	NSV	DAR	BRI	HCY	NHA	NZH	CLT	DOV	MYB	GLN; 13	MLW	TAL	SBO; DNQ	IRP	MCH	BRI	DAR	RCH	DOV	CLT	CAR	HOM										84th	124	
1998	Lewis Motorsports	9	Ford	DAY	CAR	LVS	NSV	DAR	BRI	TEX	HCY	TAL	NHA	NZH	CLT	DOV	RCH	PPR	GLN; 3	MLW	MYB	CAL																	53rd	609	
1998	NorthStar Motorsports	98	Ford																				SBO; DNQ	IRP	MCH; 39	BRI; 42	DAR; 23	RCH; 41	DOV; 25	CLT; DNQ	GTY; 28	CAR; 36	ATL	HOM					53rd	609	
2000	Lewis Motorsports	46	Chevy	DAY; DNQ	CAR	LVS	ATL	DAR; 38	BRI	TEX	NSV; DNQ	TAL	CAL	RCH; 29	NHA; DNQ	CLT; DNQ	DOV; 42	SBO	MYB	GLN; 23	MLW; DNQ	NZH; 28	PPR; 29	GTY	IRP; 23	MCH; 17	BRI; DNQ	DAR; 30	RCH; DNQ	DOV; 25	CLT; DNQ	CAR; 31	MEM; DNQ	PHO; DNQ	HOM; DNQ				51st	848	
2001	Lewis Motorsports	46	Chevy	DAY; 31	CAR; 33	LVS; 30	ATL; 39	DAR; 19	BRI; 27	TEX; 11	NSH; 42	TAL; 31	CAL; 22	RCH; 32	NHA; 29	NZH; 14	CLT; 13	DOV; 40	KEN; 5	MLW; 32	GLN; 37	CHI; 43	GTY	PPR; 11	IRP; 16	MCH; 20	BRI; 19	DAR; 26	RCH; 37	DOV; 16	KAN; 20	CLT; 5	MEM; 9	PHO; 24	CAR; 27	HOM; 16			20th	2904	
2002	Lewis Motorsports	46	Chevy	DAY; 33	CAR; 8	LVS; 15	DAR; 25	BRI; 18	TEX; 39	NSH; 37	TAL; 23	CAL; 16	RCH; 2	NHA; 20	NZH; 8	CLT; 20	DOV; 19	NSH; 37	KEN; 11	MLW; 38	DAY; 19	CHI; 11	GTY; 40	PPR; 9	IRP; 37	MCH; 38	BRI; 39	DAR; 23	RCH; 35	DOV; 12	KAN; 19	CLT; 33	MEM; 32	ATL; 9	CAR; 25	PHO; 8	HOM; 9		17th	3279	
2003	Lewis Motorsports	46	Chevy	DAY; 25	CAR; 16	LVS; 27	DAR; 25	BRI; 18	TEX; 27	TAL; 20	NSH; 3	CAL; 12	RCH; 30	**GTY**; 33	NZH; 35	CLT; 8	DOV; 22	NSH; 6	KEN; 7	MLW; 12	DAY; 12	CHI; 42	NHA; 11	PPR; 9	IRP; 34	MCH; 36	BRI; 10	DAR; 20	RCH; 19	DOV; 7	KAN; 6	CLT; 16	MEM; 10	ATL; 11	PHO; 12	CAR; 12	HOM; 5		12th	3804	
2004	Lewis Motorsports	46	Chevy	DAY; 14	CAR; 15	LVS; 29	DAR; 20	BRI; 31	TEX; 33	NSH; 21	TAL; 17	CAL; 14	GTY; 15	RCH; 15	NZH; 23	CLT; 10	DOV; 25	NSH; 9	KEN; 8	MLW; 13	DAY; 14	CHI; 5	NHA; 17	PPR; 18	IRP; 14	MCH; 13	BRI; 26	CAL; 23	RCH; 20	DOV; 21	KAN; 4	CLT; 35	MEM; 9	ATL; 12	PHO; 9	DAR; 2	HOM; 14		8th	3892	
2005	Team Rensi Motorsports	25	Ford	DAY; 13	CAL; 11	MXC; 9	LVS; 22	ATL; 14	NSH; 19	BRI; 8	TEX; 32	PHO; 17	TAL; 4	DAR; 14	RCH; 16	CLT; 10	DOV; 14	NSH; 25	KEN; 25	MLW; 18	DAY; 26	CHI; 11	NHA; 28	PPR; 15	GTY; 36	IRP; 15	GLN; 31	MCH; 26	BRI; 31	CAL; 31	RCH; 30	DOV; 14	KAN; 28	CLT; 8	MEM; 31	TEX; 21	PHO; 21	HOM; 43	14th	3587	
2006	Team Rensi Motorsports	25	Ford	DAY; 12	CAL; 29	MXC; 13	LVS; 13	ATL; 17	BRI; 30	TEX; 38	NSH; 11	PHO; 20	TAL; 33	RCH; 26	DAR; 20	CLT; 28	DOV; 42	NSH; 9	KEN; 5	MLW; 16	DAY; 17	CHI; 35	NHA; 24	MAR; 27	GTY; 16	IRP; 22	GLN; 33	MCH; 39	BRI; 18	CAL; 5	RCH; 31	DOV; 25	KAN; 14	CLT; 11	MEM; 37	TEX; 25	PHO; 24	HOM; 20	15th	3376	
