= NASCAR O'Reilly Auto Parts Series at Rockingham Speedway =

NASCAR O'Reilly Auto Parts Series race at Rockingham Speedway

NASCAR O'Reilly Auto Parts Series
- Venue: Rockingham Speedway
- Location: Richmond County, North Carolina, United States

Circuit information
- Surface: Asphalt
- Length: 0.94 mi (1.51 km)
- Turns: 4

Stock car races in the NASCAR O'Reilly Auto Parts Series were held at Rockingham Speedway from the series' inception in 1982 until 2026.

== Spring race ==
North Carolina Education Lottery 250

NASCAR O'Reilly Auto Parts Series
- First race: 1982
- Last race: 2026
- Distance: 235 miles (378.2 km)
- Laps: 250; Stages 1/2: 60 each Final stage: 130
- Previous names: Coca-Cola 200 (1982–1983); Komfort Koach 200 (1984–1985); Protecta-Liner 200 (1986); Goodwrench 200 (1988–1995); Goodwrench Service 200 (1996–1997); GM Goodwrench Service Plus 200 (1998); Alltel 200 (1999–2001); 1-866RBCTerm.com 200 (2002); Rockingham 200 (2003); Goody's Headache Powder 200 (2004)
- Most wins (driver): Mark Martin (5)
- Most wins (team): Roush Racing (5)
- Most wins (manufacturer): Ford (8)

=== Past winners ===
| Year | Date | Driver | Team | Manufacturer | Race Distance | | Race Time | Average Speed (mph) | Report | Ref |
| Year | Date | Driver | Team | Manufacturer | Laps | Miles (km) | Race Time | Average Speed (mph) | Report | Ref |
|---|---|---|---|---|---|---|---|---|---|---|
| 1982 | June 27 | David Pearson | David Pearson | Pontiac | 197 | 200.349 (322.43) | | 99.074 | Report | |
| 1983 | March 5 | Dale Earnhardt | Robert Gee | Pontiac | 148* | 150.516 (242.232) | 1:36:57 | 91.892 | Report | |
| 1984 | March 3 | Sam Ard | Thomas Brothers Racing | Oldsmobile | 197 | 200.349 (322.43) | 1:43:34 | 116.07 | Report | |
| 1985 | March 2 | Dale Earnhardt | Dale Earnhardt, Inc. | Pontiac | 197 | 200.349 (322.43) | 1:53:38 | 105.787 | Report | |
| 1986 | March 1 | Dale Earnhardt | Dale Earnhardt, Inc. | Pontiac | 197 | 200.349 (322.43) | 1:50:08 | 109.148 | Report | |
| 1987 | Not held | | | | | | | | | |
| 1988 | March 5 | Mark Martin | Bruce Lawmaster | Ford | 197 | 200.349 (322.43) | 1:54:05 | 104.651 | Report | |
| 1989 | March 4 | Rob Moroso | Dick Moroso | Oldsmobile | 197 | 200.349 (322.43) | 1:45:51 | 113.566 | Report | |
| 1990 | March 3 | Dale Earnhardt | Dale Earnhardt, Inc. | Chevrolet | 197 | 200.349 (322.43) | 1:52:24 | 106.948 | Report | |
| 1991 | March 2 | Dale Jarrett | Dale Jarrett | Pontiac | 197 | 200.349 (322.43) | 1:48:31 | 110.775 | Report | |
| 1992 | February 29 | Ward Burton | A.G. Dillard Motorsports | Buick | 197 | 200.349 (322.43) | 2:11:10 | 96.646 | Report | |
| 1993 | February 27 | Mark Martin | Roush Racing | Ford | 197 | 200.349 (322.43) | 1:46:21 | 113.032 | Report | |
| 1994 | February 26 | Terry Labonte | Labonte Motorsports | Chevrolet | 197 | 200.349 (322.43) | 1:53:14 | 106.161 | Report | |
| 1995 | February 25 | Chad Little | Mark Rypien Motorsports | Ford | 197 | 200.349 (322.43) | 1:39:30 | 120.753 | Report | |
| 1996 | February 24 | Mark Martin | Roush Racing | Ford | 197 | 200.349 (322.43) | 1:53:26 | 105.974 | Report | |
| 1997 | February 22 | Mark Martin | Roush Racing | Ford | 197 | 200.349 (322.43) | 1:43:24 | 116.256 | Report | |
| 1998 | February 21 | Matt Kenseth | Reiser Enterprises | Chevrolet | 197 | 200.349 (322.43) | 1:40:00 | 120.209 | Report | |
| 1999 | February 20 | Jeff Burton | Roush Racing | Ford | 197 | 200.349 (322.43) | 1:56:02 | 103.599 | Report | |
| 2000 | February 26 | Mark Martin | Roush Racing | Ford | 197 | 200.349 (322.43) | 1:37:28 | 123.334 | Report | |
| 2001 | February 24 | Todd Bodine | Buckshot Racing | Chevrolet | 197 | 200.349 (322.43) | 1:47:17 | 112.049 | Report | |
| 2002 | February 23 | Jason Keller | ppc Racing | Ford | 197 | 200.349 (322.43) | 1:44:09 | 115.419 | Report | |
| 2003 | February 24 | Jamie McMurray | Phoenix Racing | Dodge | 197 | 200.349 (322.43) | 1:58:04 | 101.815 | Report | |
| 2004 | February 21 | Jamie McMurray | Braun Racing | Dodge | 197 | 200.349 (322.43) | 1:46:54 | 112.45 | Report | |
| 2005 – 2024 | Not held | | | | | | | | | |
| 2025 | April 19 | Sammy Smith | JR Motorsports | Chevrolet | 256* | 240.64 (387.271) | 2:59:38 | 80.377 | Report | |
| 2026 | April 4 | William Sawalich | Joe Gibbs Racing | Toyota | 250 | 235 (378.2) | 2:22:36 | 98.878 | Report | |

- 1983: Race shortened due to crash.
- 2025: Race extended due to a NASCAR overtime finish.

=== Multiple winners (drivers) ===
| # Wins | Driver | Years won |
|---|---|---|
| 5 | Mark Martin | 1988, 1993, 1996, 1997, 2000 |
| 4 | Dale Earnhardt | 1983, 1985, 1986, 1990 |
| 2 | Jamie McMurray | 2003, 2004 |

=== Multiple winners (teams) ===
| # Wins | Team | Years won |
|---|---|---|
| 5 | Roush Racing | 1993, 1996, 1997, 1999, 2000 |
| 3 | Dale Earnhardt Inc. | 1985, 1986, 1990 |

=== Manufacturer wins ===
| # Wins | Make | Years won |
|---|---|---|
| 8 | (United States) Ford | 1988, 1993, 1995, 1996, 1997, 1999, 2000, 2002 |
| 5 | (United States) Chevrolet | 1990, 1994, 1998, 2001, 2025 |
| 5 | (United States) Pontiac | 1982, 1983, 1985, 1986, 1991 |
| 2 | (United States) Oldsmobile | 1984, 1989 |
| 2 | (United States) Dodge | 2003, 2004 |

== Former Fall race ==
Target House 200
NASCAR Busch Series
- Venue: Rockingham Speedway
- Location: Richmond County, North Carolina, United States
- First race: 1984
- Last race: 2003
- Distance: 235 miles (378.2 km)
- Laps: 250
- Previous names: Komfort Koach 200 (1984); Sandhills 200 (1985–1986); AC-Delco 200 (1987–1998); Kmart 200 (1999); Sam's Club 200 (2000–2002); Target House 200 (2003)
- Most wins (driver): Mark Martin (6)
- Most wins (team): Roush Racing (6)
- Most wins (manufacturer): Ford/Chevy (6)

=== Past winners ===
| Year | Date | Driver | Team | Manufacturer | Race Distance | | Race Time | Average Speed (mph) |
| Year | Date | Driver | Team | Manufacturer | Laps | Miles (km) | Race Time | Average Speed (mph) |
|---|---|---|---|---|---|---|---|---|
| 1984 | October 20 | Geoff Bodine | Hendrick Motorsports | Pontiac | 197 | 200.349 (322.43) | 2:06:51 | 94.765 |
| 1985 | October 19 | Brett Bodine | Hendrick Motorsports | Pontiac | 197 | 200.349 (322.43) | 1:56:00 | 103.629 |
| 1986 | October 18 | Morgan Shepherd | Whitaker Racing | Buick | 197 | 200.349 (322.43) | 1:39:08 | 101.177 |
| 1987 | October 24 | Morgan Shepherd | Morgan Shepherd | Buick | 197 | 200.349 (322.43) | 1:52:29 | 106.396 |
| 1988 | October 22 | Harry Gant | Whitaker Racing | Buick | 197 | 200.349 (322.43) | 1:50:09 | 109.132 |
| 1989 | October 21 | Harry Gant | Whitaker Racing | Buick | 197 | 200.349 (322.43) | 1:47:32 | 111.788 |
| 1990 | October 20 | Steve Grissom | Grissom Racing Enterprises | Oldsmobile | 197 | 200.349 (322.43) | 1:53:31 | 105.896 |
| 1991 | October 19 | Ernie Irvan | Ernie Irvan | Chevrolet | 197 | 200.349 (322.43) | 1:55:13 | 104.333 |
| 1992 | October 24 | Mark Martin | Mark Martin | Ford | 197 | 200.349 (322.43) | 1:41:30 | 118.433 |
| 1993 | October 23 | Mark Martin | Roush Racing | Ford | 197 | 200.349 (322.43) | 1:42:37 | 117.144 |
| 1994 | October 22 | Mark Martin | Roush Racing | Ford | 197 | 200.349 (322.43) | 1:49:15 | 110.032 |
| 1995 | October 21 | Todd Bodine | Parker Racing | Chevrolet | 197 | 200.349 (322.43) | 2:01:48 | 98.694 |
| 1996 | October 19 | Mark Martin | Roush Racing | Ford | 197 | 200.349 (322.43) | 1:36:38 | 124.397 |
| 1997 | October 25 | Mark Martin | Roush Racing | Ford | 197 | 200.349 (322.43) | 1:59:42 | 100.426 |
| 1998 | October 31 | Elliott Sadler | Diamond Ridge Motorsports | Chevrolet | 197 | 200.349 (322.43) | 1:43:31 | 116.126 |
| 1999 | October 23 | Mark Martin | Roush Racing | Ford | 197 | 200.349 (322.43) | 1:45:36 | 113.835 |
| 2000 | October 21 | Jeff Green | ppc Racing | Chevrolet | 197 | 200.349 (322.43) | 1:46:15 | 113.138 |
| 2001 | November 3 | Kenny Wallace | Innovative Motorsports | Chevrolet | 197 | 200.349 (322.43) | 1:36:56 | 124.012 |
| 2002 | November 2 | Jamie McMurray | Brewco Motorsports | Chevrolet | 197 | 200.349 (322.43) | 1:41:18 | 118.667 |
| 2003 | November 8 | Jamie McMurray | Phoenix Racing | Dodge | 197 | 200.349 (322.43) | 1:40:19 | 119.83 |

=== Multiple winners (drivers) ===
| # Wins | Driver | Years won |
|---|---|---|
| 6 | Mark Martin | 1992, 1993, 1994, 1996, 1997, 1999 |
| 2 | Jamie McMurray | 2002, 2003 |
| 2 | Morgan Shepherd | 1986, 1987 |
| 2 | Harry Gant | 1988, 1989 |

=== Multiple winners (teams) ===
| # Wins | Team | Years won |
|---|---|---|
| 5 | Roush Racing | 1993, 1994, 1996, 1997, 1999 |
| 3 | Whitaker Racing | 1986, 1988, 1989 |
| 2 | Hendrick Motorsports | 1984, 1985 |

=== Manufacturer wins ===
| # Wins | Make | Years won |
|---|---|---|
| 6 | (United States) Ford | 1992, 1993, 1994, 1996, 1997, 1999 |
| 6 | (United States) Chevrolet | 1991, 1995, 1998, 2000, 2001, 2002 |
| 4 | (United States) Buick | 1986, 1987, 1988, 1989 |
| 2 | (United States) Pontiac | 1984, 1985 |

| Previous race: NFPA 250 | NASCAR O'Reilly Auto Parts Series; North Carolina Education Lottery 250 | Next race: SciAps 300 |
