= Channellock =

American hand tools company

Channellock Inc.
- Type: Private
- Industry: Manufacturing
- Founded: Evansburg, Pennsylvania (present day Conneaut Lake, Pennsylvania), United States (1886)
- Founder: George B. DeArment
- Headquarters: Meadville, Pennsylvania, United States
- Key people: William S. DeArment; (CEO & chairman of the Board); Jon S. DeArment; (president & COO); Ryan DeArment; (vice president of sales and marketing); Howard Manning; (former chief engineer, inventor)
- Products: Hand tools and automotive accessories
- Number of employees: 400
- Website: www.channellock.com auto.channellock.com

Channellock is an American company that produces hand tools and automotive accessories. It is best known for its pliers—the company manufactures more than 75 types and sizes of pliers—particularly its eponymous style of tongue-and-groove, slip-joint pliers. Its pliers have distinctive sky-blue handle grips; the company has been using the same trademarked shade of blue since 1956.

It also produces cutting pliers, linemen's pliers, long nose pliers, adjustable wrenches, screwdrivers, nutdrivers and special-purpose pliers, as well as multi-function tools for the fire service and other first responders. According to the company, as of 2021, all of its pliers were manufactured at one of its two facilities in Meadville, Pennsylvania. However, not all products sold by the company are produced in the United States; products such as screwdrivers and ratchet wrenches are produced in Canada, Taiwan, or China.

Channellock has started making automotive accessories including headache racks, bike racks, ladder rack systems, UTV racks, and sled decks under the name Channellock® Auto as of February 18, 2025.

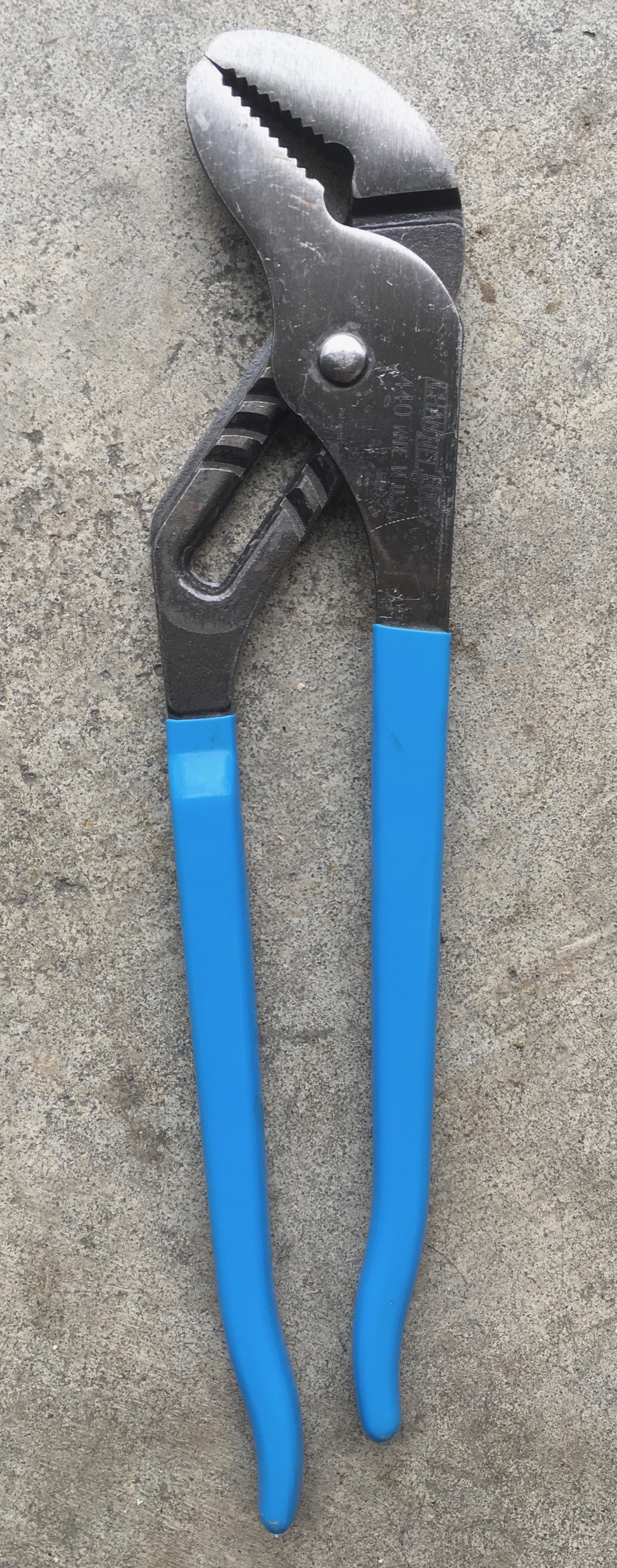
Tongue-and-groove pliers with classic sky-blue handle grips.

== History ==
The company was founded in 1886 when George B. DeArment, a blacksmith from Evansburg, Pennsylvania (present day Conneaut Lake, Pennsylvania), began hand-forging farrier's tools and selling them from town to town out of the back of a wagon. He would spend the Winter forging tools, load up his wagon in the Spring when roads became passable, and set out selling his tools. When he ran out of tools, he would sell the wagon and buy a train ticket home to Evansburg. The business eventually became known as the Champion Bolt and Clipper Company.

In 1904, the company moved to a 12,000-square-foot (1,100 m^{2}) facility in Meadville, Pennsylvania, and added nippers, pinchers and open-end wrenches to its product line. George B. DeArment’s two sons, Almon W. and J. Howard DeArment, became partners in the company in 1911 and expanded the product line again to include hammers. In 1923, the company moved again to a 33,000-square-foot (3,100 m^{2}) facility at its current location in Meadville. Four years later, the name of the company was changed to the Champion–DeArment Tool Company.

In 1933, Chief Engineer Howard Manning developed the tongue-and-groove, slip-joint pliers for which the company is known. In 1934, a patent for this design was granted, and in 1949, a trademark for the name "Channellock" was granted, with a first-use date of May 1, 1932.

From this point to the 1960s, the company began to focus more on the fast-growing pliers side of its business, developing improvements to the original design. For a time the company was also a supplier to Sears for their Craftsman brand, for hand tools such as pliers. These had a "C" maker's mark to denote this. The word "Channellock" eventually became so synonymous with their product that the company changed its name to Channellock, Inc. in 1963 to capitalize on the popularity of its product.

In February 2025, Channellock has partnered with Cody New and Rick Sauder of MULTY® Rack Systems from British Columbia, Canada, to expand into the automotive accessory market. This new partnership adds modular automotive accessories to the existing hand-tool market Channellock is known for.

== Today ==
Channellock is managed by the fourth and fifth generations of the DeArment family with William S. DeArment as CEO & Chairman of the Board, Jon S. DeArment as President & COO, and Ryan DeArment as Vice President of Sales and Marketing. The company is based out of two facilities, totaling 260,000 square feet (24,000 m^{2}), in Meadville. As of 2023, the company claimed to be among the largest employers in Crawford County, Pennsylvania, with over 350 full-time employees. The company has more than 4,000 U.S. wholesale and retail customers and ships to customers in 45 countries.

== Gallery ==
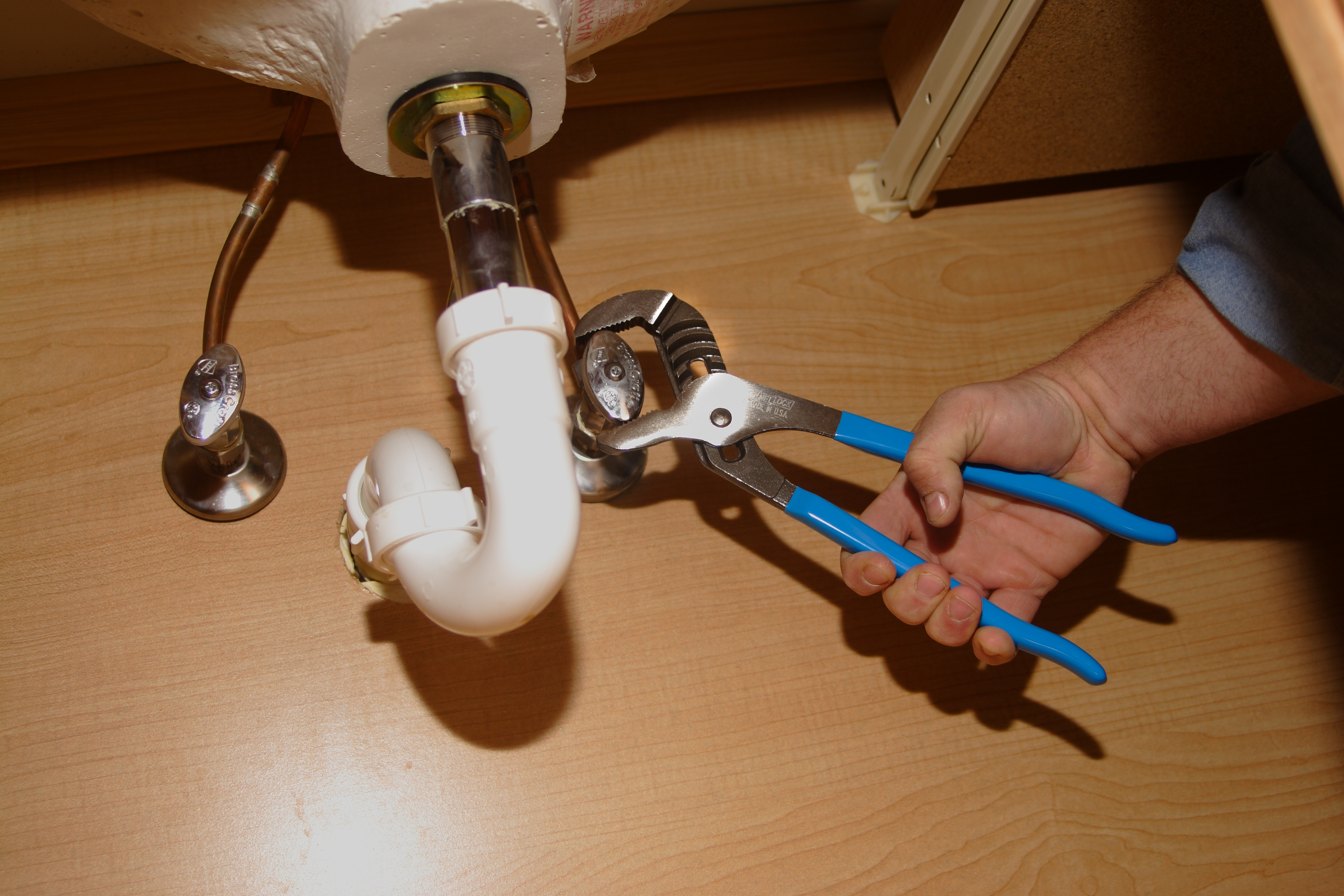
A pair of Channellock tongue-and-groove pliers, from which the company takes its name.

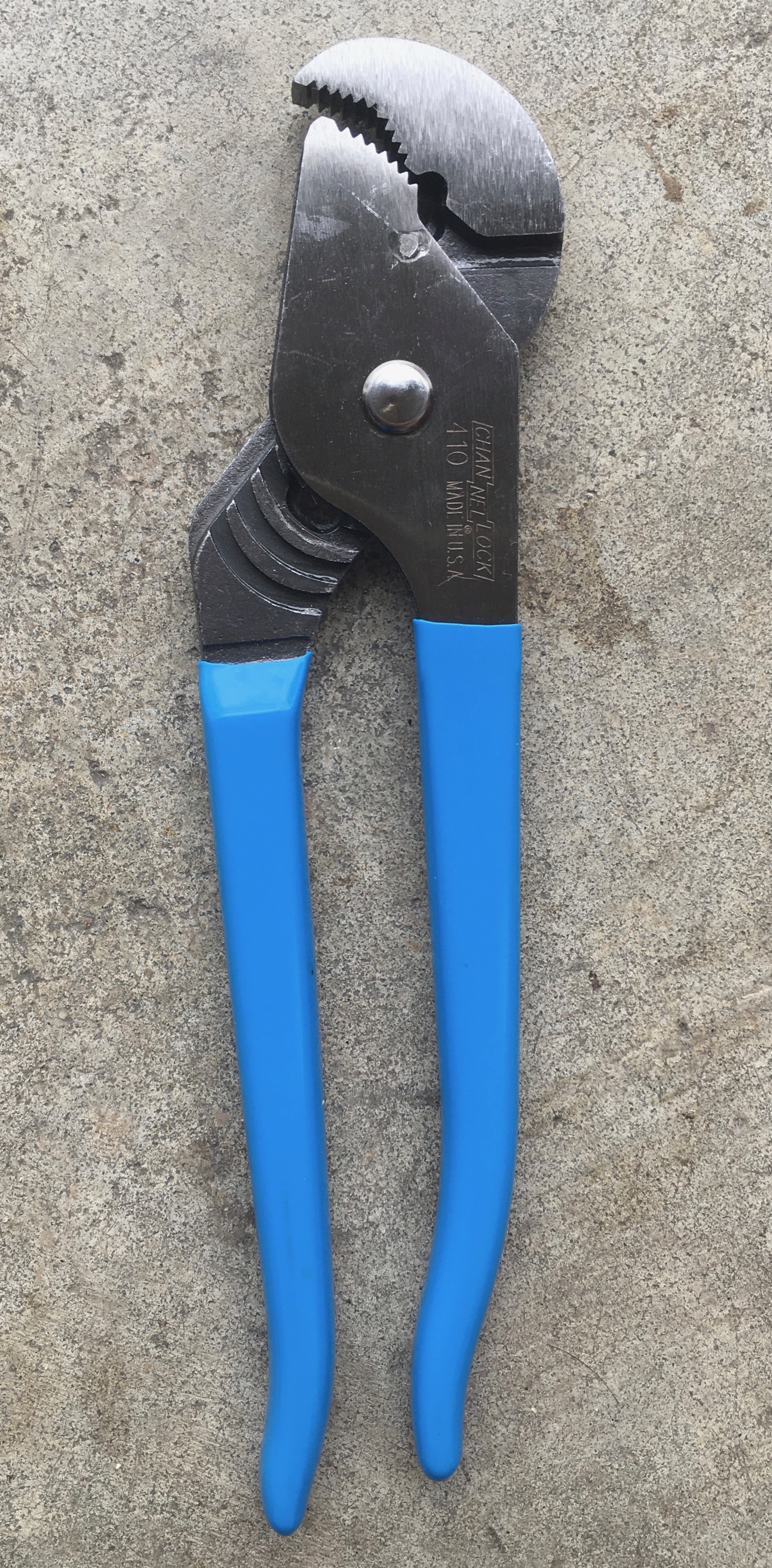
"Nutbuster" variant with parrot-nose for round surfaces and nuts.

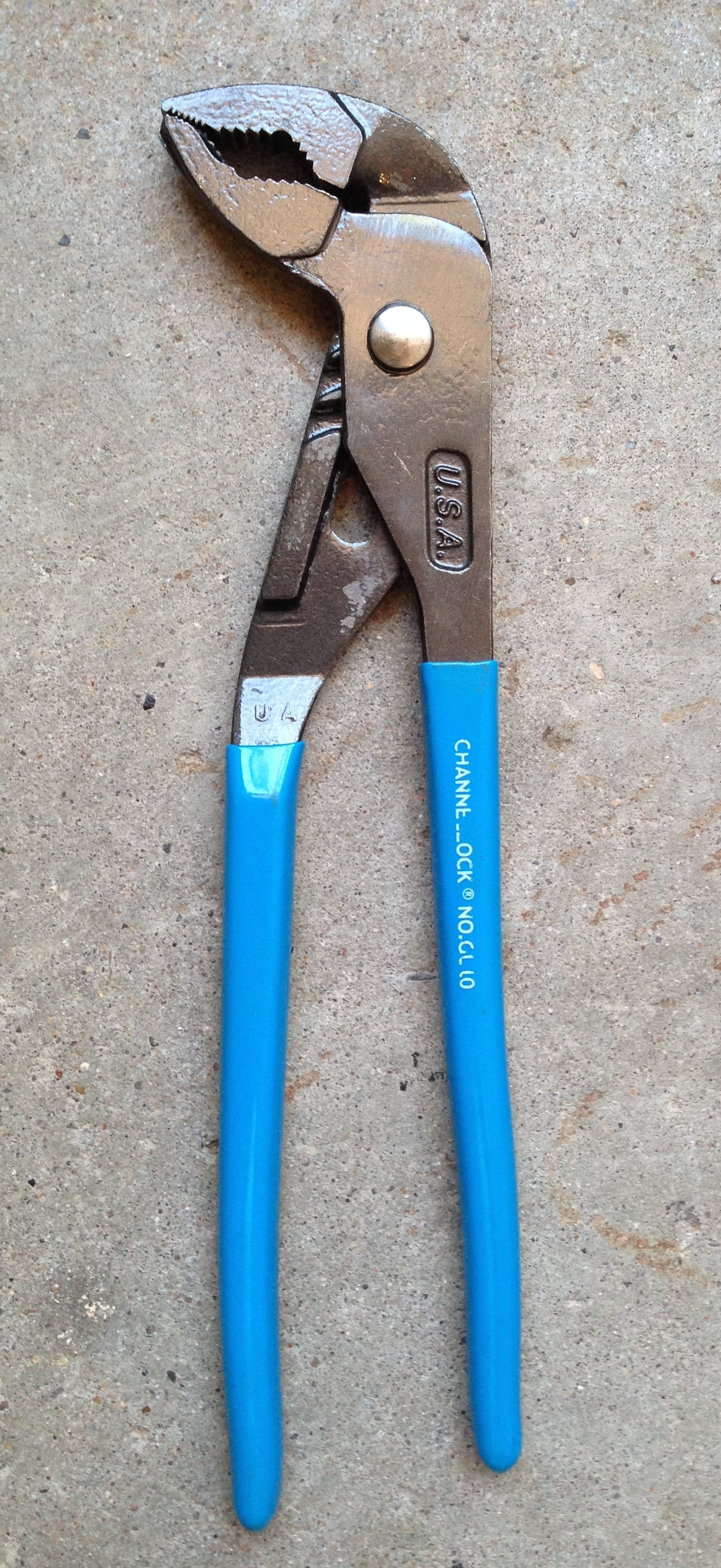
"GripLock" variant with V-shaped jaws for gripping round stock.

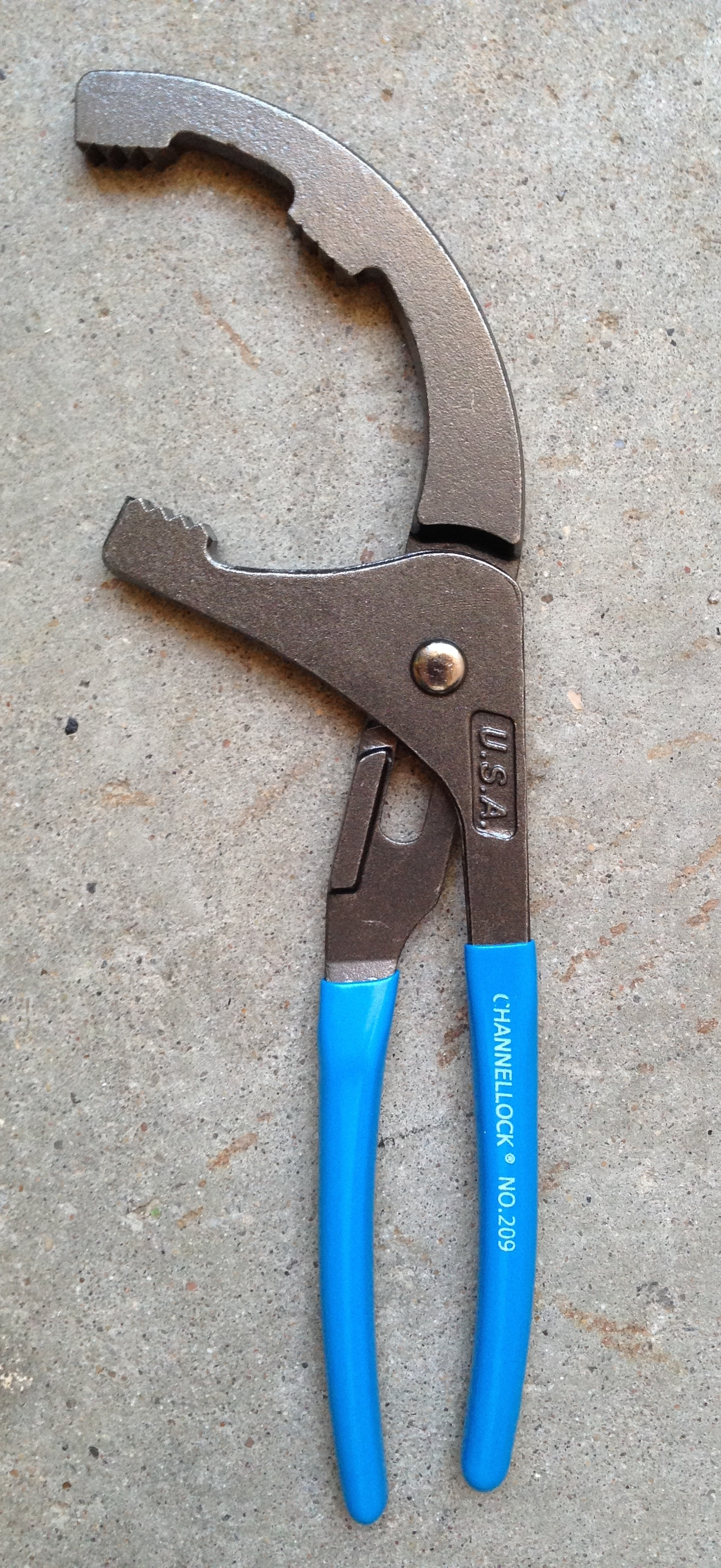
Oil filter/PVC pipe pliers.

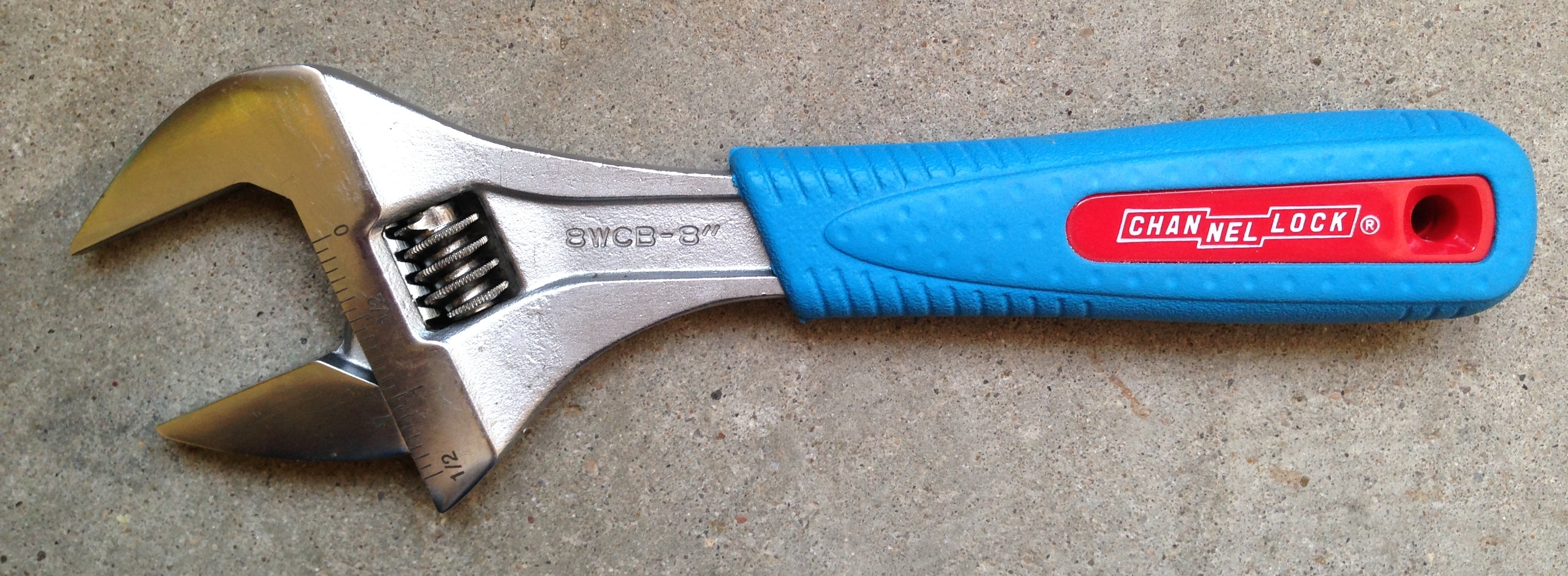
A wide-mouth adjustable wrench.

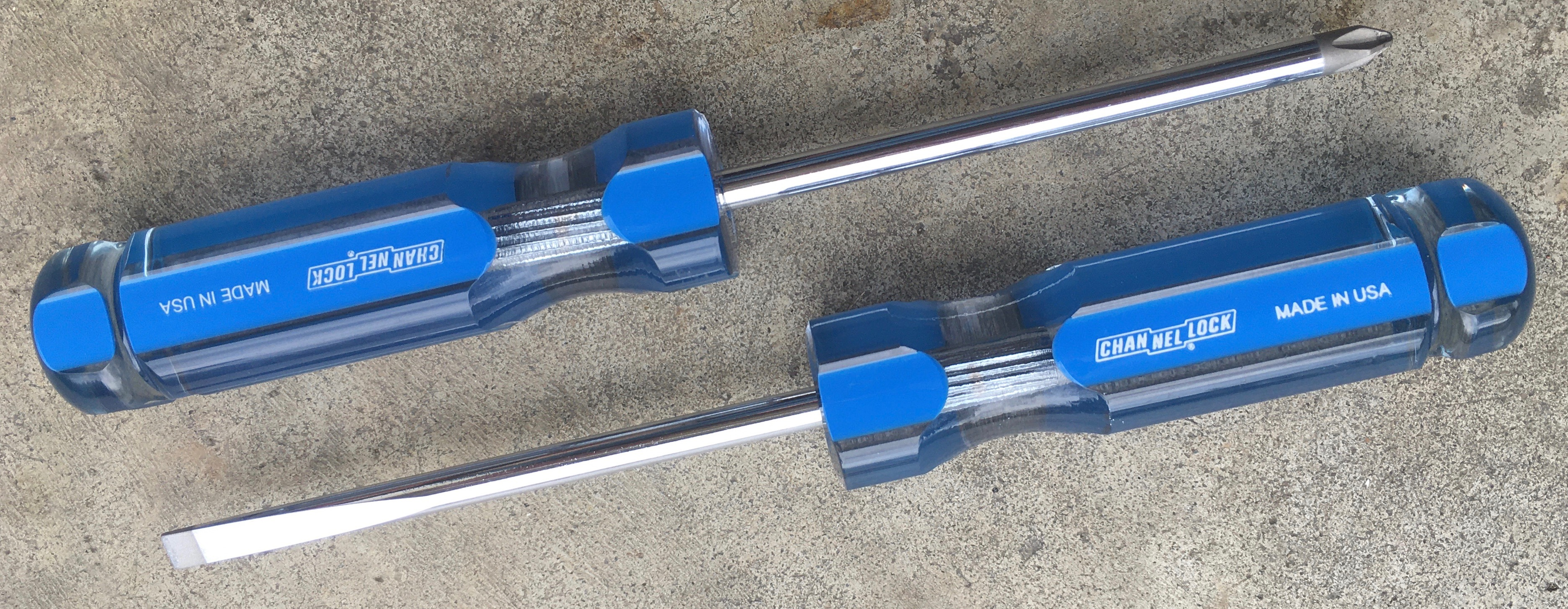
Phillips and slotted screwdrivers.

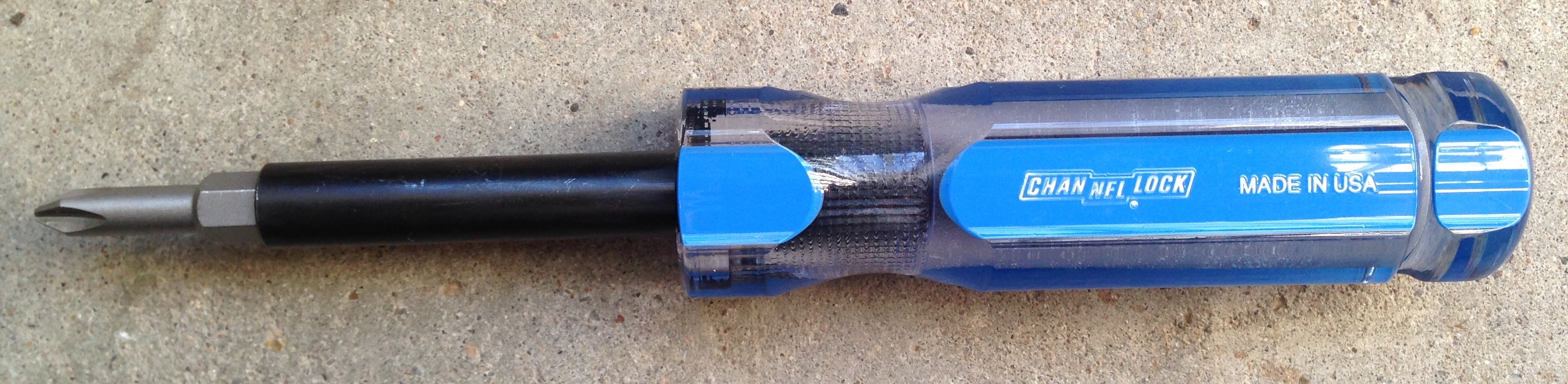
A 6-in-1 screwdriver.

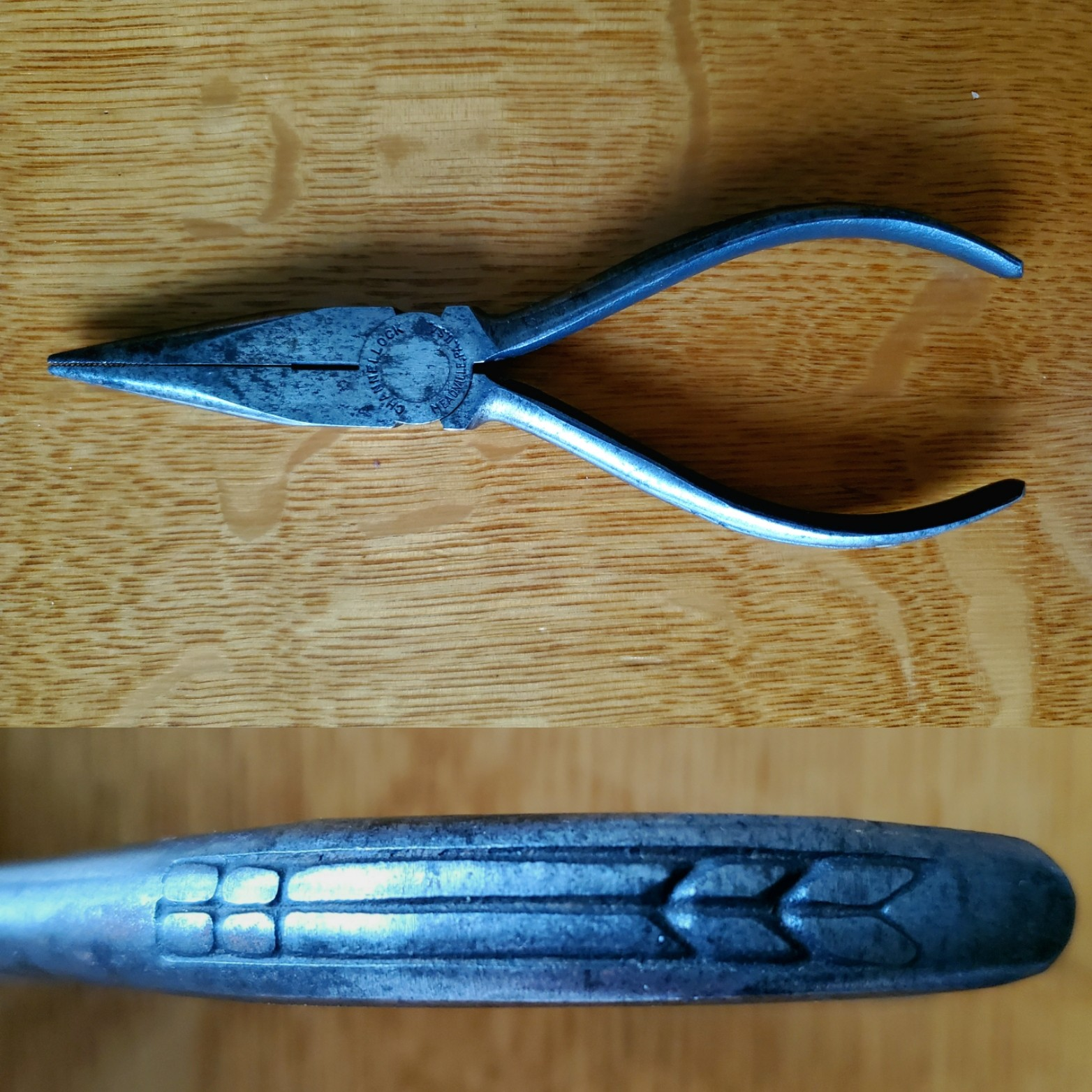
Antique Channellock needle-nose pliers with handle detail, 1930s.
