= Rusty Wallace Racing =

Former NASCAR racing team

Rusty Wallace, Inc.
- Owner: Rusty Wallace
- Base: Mooresville, North Carolina
- Series: Nationwide Series
- Manufacturer: Toyota, Ford, Dodge, Chevrolet
- Opened: 1985 (re-opened 2004)
- Closed: 2013

Career
- Drivers' Championships: 0
- Race victories: 4
- Pole positions: 12

Rusty Wallace Racing, LLC (RWR), formerly known as Rusty Wallace, Inc. (RWI) was a NASCAR racing team based in Mooresville, North Carolina, near Charlotte. Owned by former NASCAR Winston Cup champion and commentator Rusty Wallace, the team competed primarily in the Xfinity Series with Wallace's younger brother Kenny Wallace and son Steve Wallace.

On January 6, 2012, Rusty Wallace that the team would go on a temporary hiatus after being unable to find sponsorship. The team returned to the Nationwide Series with Steven Wallace in 2012 at Richmond for a single race. The team made its final Nationwide Series start in 2013 with Steve Wallace behind the wheel.

Rusty Wallace Racing continues to operate, fielding super late models for Steve Wallace in the CARS Tour and NASCAR Local Racing Series.

== Team history ==
RWI was founded in 1984 as Rusty Wallace's marketing firm. It began fielding racecars in 1985, with Wallace driving the No. 66 Oldsmobile. He won a pole in his first race at Daytona, and ran three more races that season, which included two consecutive top-fives. He ran three races in 1986 and 1988, and had four top-tens with sponsorship from Alugard and Kodiak.

Beginning with the 1989 season, Wallace began fielding the No. 36 Cox Treated Lumber Pontiac for his youngest brother Kenny. He would win three poles and had sixteen top-ten finishes, and was named Rookie of the Year in addition to his sixth-place points finish. After a winless 1990, he earned his first career victory at Volusia, followed by another win later in the year at New Hampshire, allowing him to finish a career-best 2nd in points. In 1992, Dirt Devil became the team's new sponsor, and Wallace had just one win and fell to sixth in points. After Kenny's promotion to the Winston Cup series, the team shut down.

RWI returned to competition in 2004, operating as many as three teams out of its headquarters in Mooresville, North Carolina. Following the 2011 season, the team ceased operations due to lack of sponsorship to run competitively, laying off many employees and selling half of its equipment. The downsized team returned part-time for 2012 and 2013, with equipment purchased from Roush Fenway Racing.

== Nationwide Series ==
=== Car No. 62 history ===
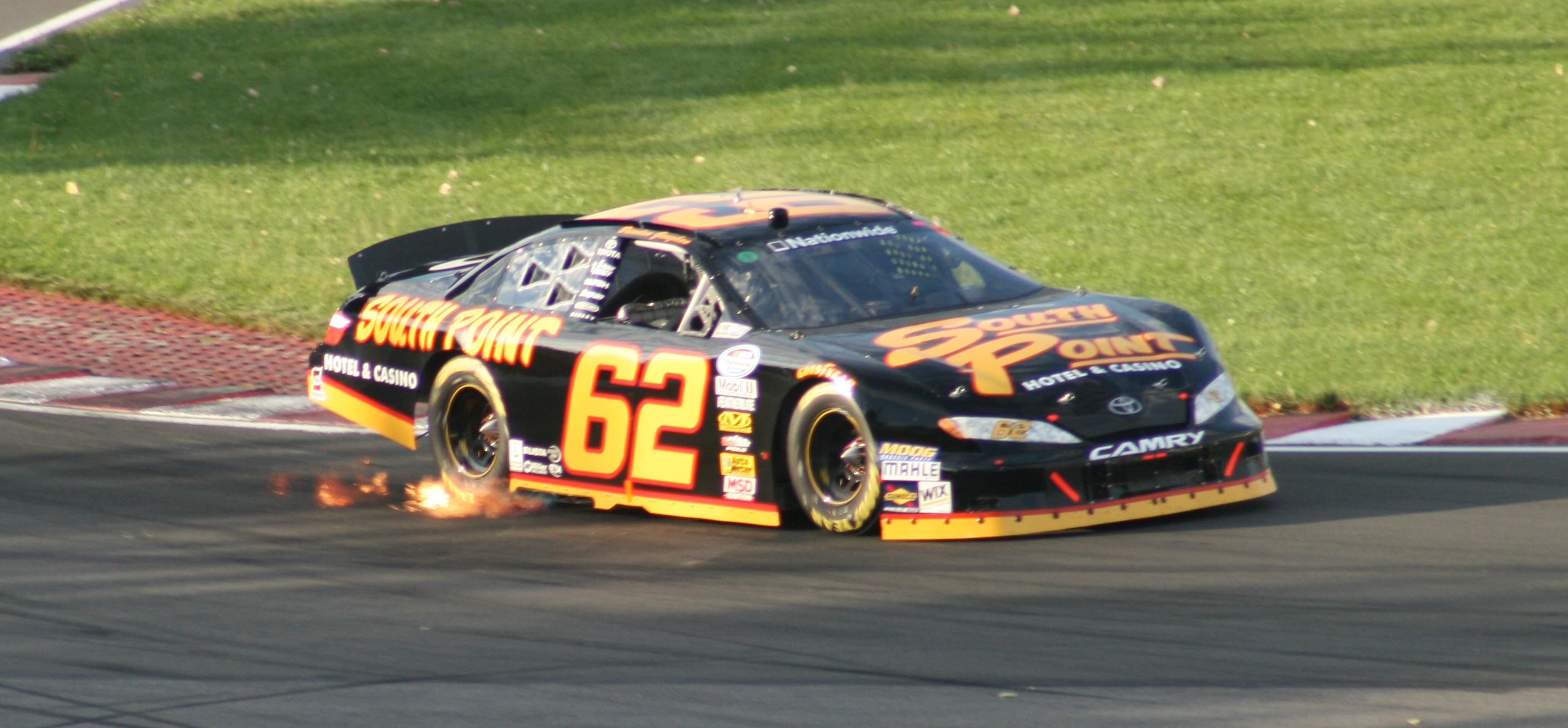
Brendan Gaughan in 2010.

The No. 62 debuted in 2006 as the No. 61 Dodge. It was driven by Steve Wallace, Rusty's youngest son, at Dover and finished 21st. It ran another race at Phoenix with Wallace finishing 16th. The renumbered 64 ran only one race in 2007, with Chase Austin finishing 41st at Memphis.

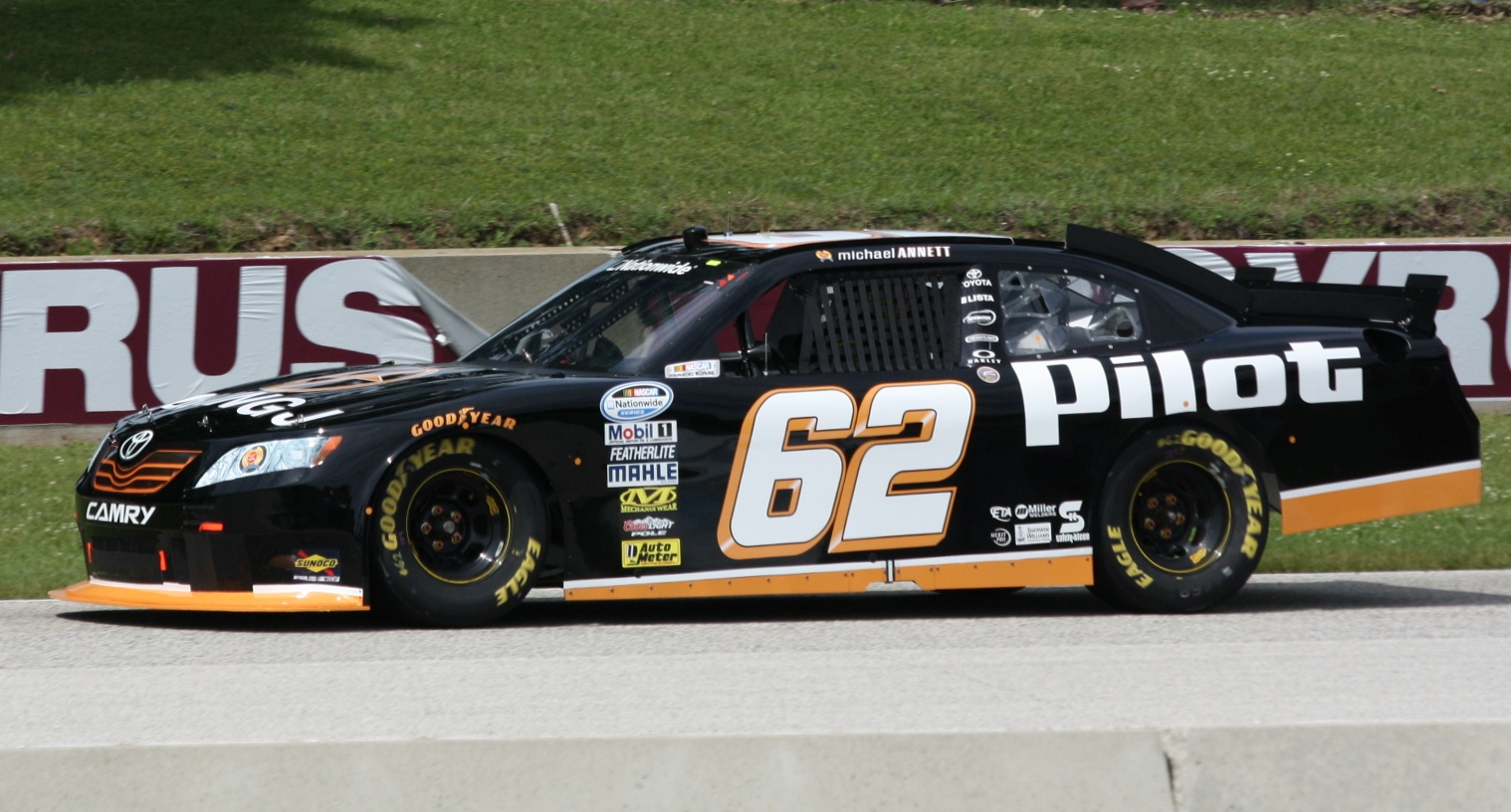
The No. 62 driven by Michael Annett in 2011

The team would run full-time in 2008 with the ride originally to be shared between Austin, Penske Racing test driver David Stremme, and road racer Max Papis, but Stremme's consistent top-10 runs put him in the seat full-time, with the exception of road courses, with 5 top-fives and 16 top-10s leading to an 11th-place points finish for him. Atreus Homes and Communities began the season as the sponsor, but soon left. Penske sponsors AVIS and Penske Trucking, and Loan Star Title Loans shared the sponsorship duties for the rest of the season. Stremme's return to the Sprint Cup Series left the seat open, and former Truck Series driver Brendan Gaughan drove the renumbered 62 in 2009 with sponsorship from South Point Hotel, Casino & Spa, before U.S. Fidelis and 5-hour Energy came over to share sponsorship with the No. 66.

Michael Annett, along with sponsor Pilot Flying J, drove the car in 2011, with Gaughan returning to the Camping World Truck Series with Germain Racing. After an arrest for a DUI prior to Daytona, Annett rebounded and finished 9th in points. Following the shutdown of RWR, Annett was released and moved to Richard Petty Motorsports, while the No. 62 team's owners points were given to JD Motorsports.

=== Car No. 62 results ===
NASCAR Nationwide Series results
Year	Driver	No.	Make	1	2	3	4	5	6	7	8	9	10	11	12	13	14	15	16	17	18	19	20	21	22	23	24	25	26	27	28	29	30	31	32	33	34	35	Owners	Pts
2006	Steve Wallace	61	Dodge	DAY	CAL	MXC	LVS	ATL	BRI	TEX	NSH	PHO	TAL	RCH	DAR	CLT	DOV	NSH	KEN	MLW	DAY	CHI	NHA	MAR	GTY	IRP	GLN	MCH	BRI	CAL	RCH	DOV; 21	KAN	CLT	MEM	TEX	PHO; 16	HOM	63rd	215
2007	Chase Austin	64	Dodge	DAY	CAL	MXC	LVS	ATL	BRI	NSH	TEX	PHO	TAL	RCH	DAR	CLT	DOV	NSH	KEN	MLW	NHA	DAY	CHI	GTY	IRP	CGV	GLN	MCH	BRI	CAL	RCH	DOV	KAN	CLT	MEM; 41	TEX	PHO	HOM	82nd	40
2008	David Stremme	64	Chevy	DAY; 42	CAL; 17	LVS; 5	ATL; 30	BRI; 9	NSH; 6	TEX; 35	PHO; 10		TAL; 2	RCH; 6	DAR; 6	CLT; 12	DOV; 3	NSH; 2	KEN; 12	MLW; 34	NHA; 17	DAY; 8	CHI; 23	GTY; 9	IRP; 13			MCH; 16	BRI; 5	CAL; 10	RCH; 9	DOV; 11	KAN; 17	CLT; 31	MEM; 10	TEX; 10	PHO; 35	HOM; 16	10th	4238
2008	Max Papis	64	Chevy									MXC; 15														CGV; 20	GLN; 11												10th	4238
2009	Brendan Gaughan	62	Chevy	DAY; 15	CAL; 9	LVS; 7	BRI; 21	TEX; 37	NSH; 17	PHO; 7	TAL; 38	RCH; 26	DAR; 19	CLT; 2	DOV; 12	NSH; 24	KEN; 4	MLW; 13	NHA; 21	DAY; 17	CHI; 13	GTY; 31	IRP; 12	IOW; 25	GLN; 22	MCH; 29	BRI; 19	CGV; 9	ATL; 31	RCH; 21	DOV; 19	KAN; 29	CAL; 7	CLT; 15	MEM; 5	TEX; 16	PHO; 19	HOM; 11	16th	3914
2010	Brendan Gaughan	62	Toyota	DAY; 30	CAL; 24	LVS; 13	BRI; 33	NSH; 10	PHO; 4	TEX; 21	TAL; 27	RCH; 9	DAR; 33	DOV; 13	CLT; 32	NSH; 13	KEN; 4	ROA; 3	NHA; 10	DAY; 29	CHI; 16	GTY; 17	IRP; 6	IOW; 31	GLN; 30	MCH; 32	BRI; 21	CGV; 27	ATL; 16	RCH; 17	DOV; 16	KAN; 9	CAL; 32	CLT; 11	GTY; 26	TEX; 17	PHO; 27	HOM; 8	12th	3767
2011	Michael Annett	62	Toyota	DAY; 39	PHO; 19	LVS; 13	BRI; 24	CAL; 18	TEX; 18	TAL; 19	NSH; 19	RCH; 16	DAR; 31	DOV; 20	IOW; 13	CLT; 14	CHI; 9	MCH; 19	ROA; 7	DAY; 6	KEN; 7	NHA; 7	NSH; 14	IRP; 29	IOW; 12	GLN; 19	CGV; 18	BRI; 6	ATL; 20	RCH; 11	CHI; 16	DOV; 12	KAN; 16	CLT; 17	TEX; 20	PHO; 10	HOM; 19		16th	944

=== Car No. 64 history ===
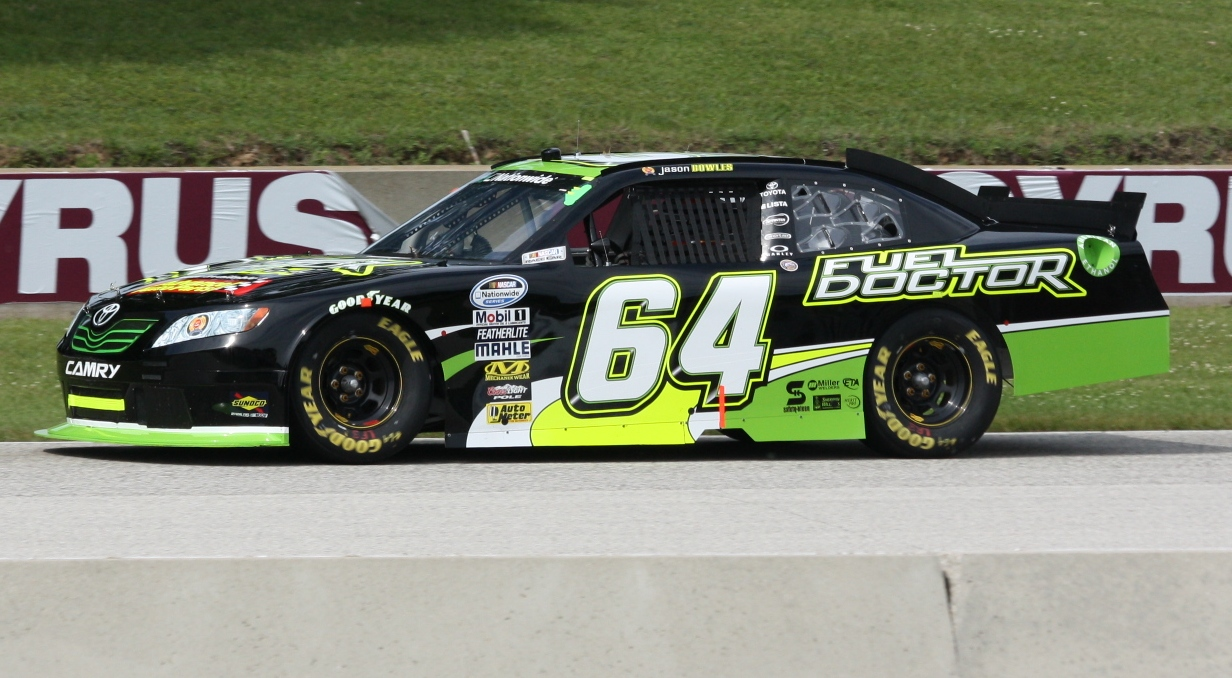
No. 64 in 2011

The No. 64 made a return in 2011 with David Reutimann running 5 races and Jason Bowles driving the car at Michigan, Road America and Watkins Glen.

=== Car No. 64 results ===
NASCAR Nationwide Series results
Year	Driver	No.	Make	1	2	3	4	5	6	7	8	9	10	11	12	13	14	15	16	17	18	19	20	21	22	23	24	25	26	27	28	29	30	31	32	33	34	Owners	Pts
2011	David Reutimann	64	Toyota	DAY	PHO	LVS	BRI	CAL	TEX	TAL	NSH; 14	RCH	DAR	DOV; 5	IOW	CLT	CHI	MCH; 18			KEN; 18	NHA	NSH	IRP	IOW			BRI; 20	ATL	RCH	CHI	DOV	KAN	CLT	TEX	PHO	HOM	39th	155
2011	Jason Bowles	64	Toyota																ROA; 34	DAY						GLN; 36	CGV; 13											39th	155

=== Car No. 66 history ===
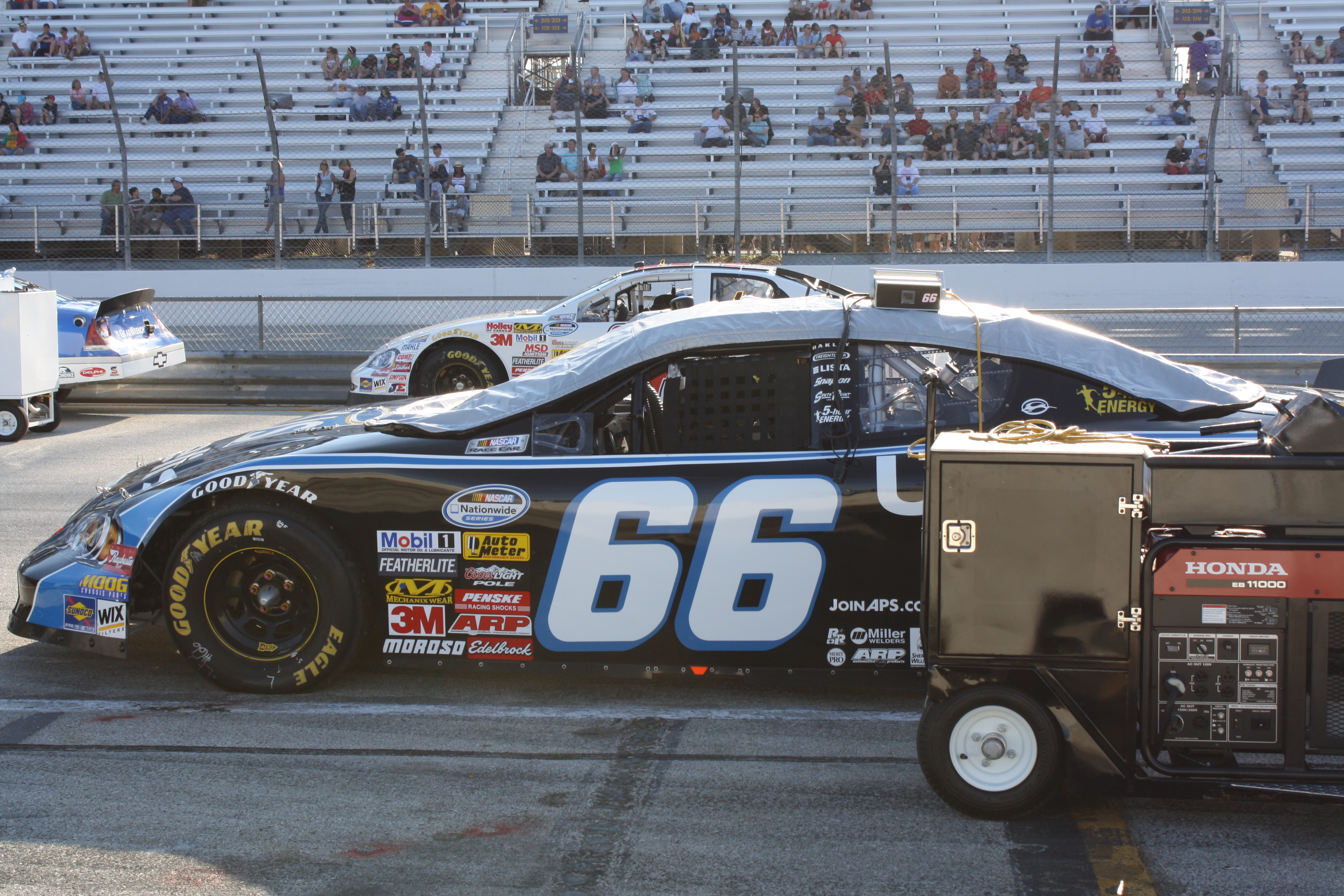
Steve Wallace in 2009.

RWI returned to competition in 2004 with late model racer Billy Parker (son of Hank Parker and brother of Hank Parker Jr.) as the driver of the No. 66 Dodge Intrepid in NASCAR's Busch Series, with primary sponsor Duraflame. Parker was scheduled to drive in 17 races, but after finishing only 4 of 8 races he was released. He was replaced by Jamie McMurray, who won the team's first pole on New Hampshire and later won the team's first race at Darlington. Rusty Wallace drove in two races as well, finishing in the top-ten both times.

In 2005, RWI ran a full 35 race schedule in the NASCAR Busch Series. At the request of Duraflame, who switched to sponsor a Brewco Motorsports entry, RWI's 66 was renumbered No. 64. McMurray shared driving duties with Wallace's former Penske Racing South teammate Jeremy Mayfield, Bill Elliott, and Wallace. Miller High Life Light and Top-Flite Golf shared sponsorship. The next season, McMurray and Steve Wallace split driver duties in the No. 64 Dodge Charger. Top-Flite Golf remained the primary sponsor during McMurray's 20 races, while the Jackson Roscoe Foundation was primary sponsor for most of Wallace's 17 races.

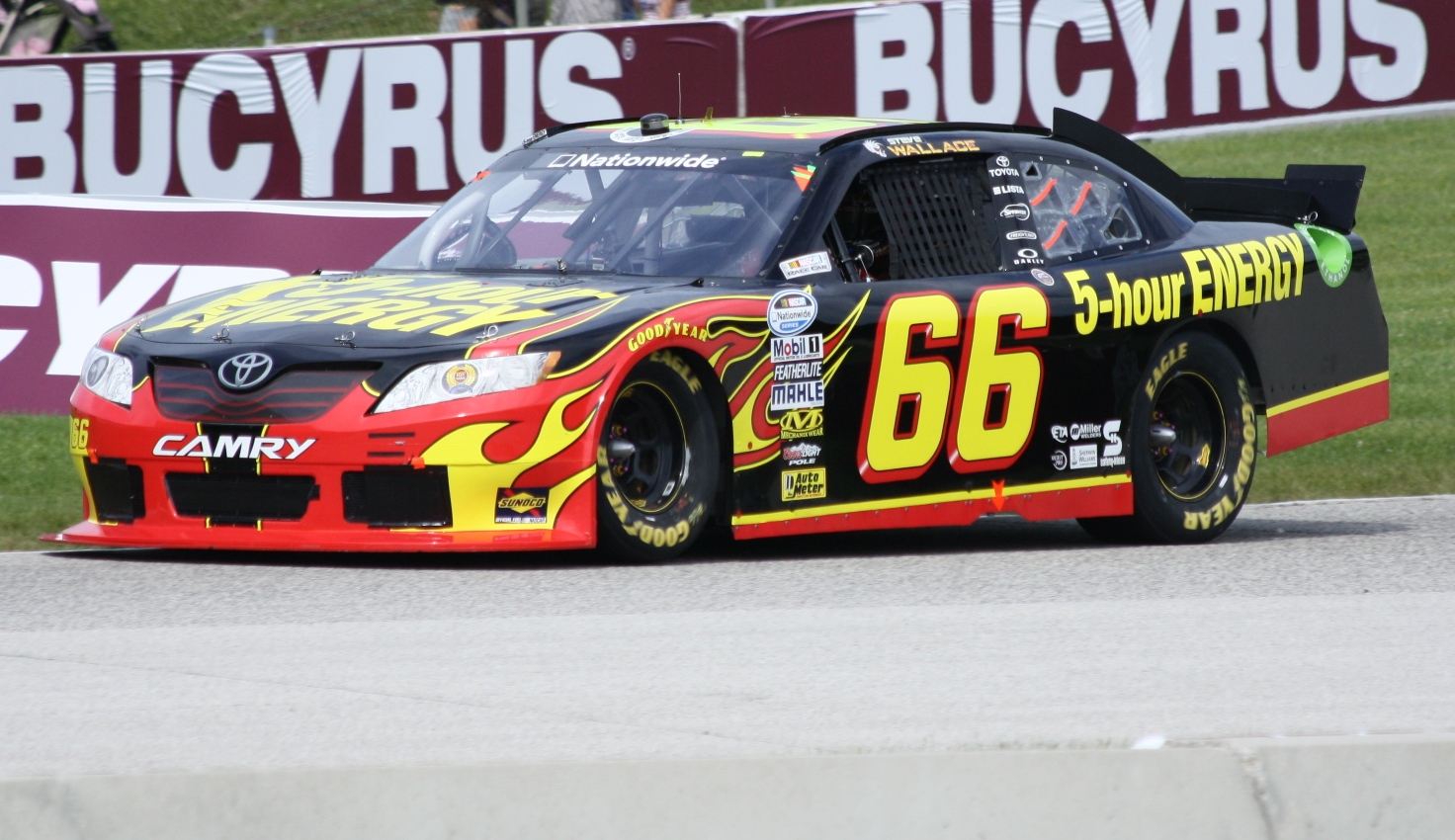
No. 66 in 2011 driven by Steve Wallace

In 2007, Steve Wallace was named the full-time driver of the newly renumbered 66, with Homelife Communities becoming a primary sponsor. Wallace won two poles but finished 19th in points. Reed Sorenson drove the 66 in one race as well. Atreus Homes and Jimmy John's sponsored Wallace in 2008, who had seven top-ten finishes. US Fidelis and 5-Hour Energy sponsored Wallace's full-time run in 2009, with one top five and nine top tens with a respectable 7th-place points finish. After U.S. Fidelis ran into financial trouble, 5-hour Energy sponsored the team in 2010 and 2011, finishing 10th in points in both seasons respectively. After 5-hour Energy left RWR to sponsor Clint Bowyer at Michael Waltrip Racing in the Cup Series, team owner Rusty Wallace was forced to suspend the Nationwide Series operations and handed the No. 66 owners points to MAKE Motorsports.

In 2012, the team ran a single race with Steve Wallace in No. 4 Ford Mustang at the Virginia 529 College Savings 250 at Richmond, using the owners points of Jay Robinson Racing. Wallace started and finished in 11th place. For 2013, RWR and Wallace planned to run 10 to 15 races with sponsorship from Richard Tocado Companies, and equipment purchased from Roush Fenway Racing. The team ended up only running one race, the History 300 at Charlotte Motor Speedway, with the Steven Wallace driving the No. 66. Wallace started 40th and finished 25th.

=== Car No. 66 results ===
NASCAR Nationwide Series results
Year	Driver	No.	Make	1	2	3	4	5	6	7	8	9	10	11	12	13	14	15	16	17	18	19	20	21	22	23	24	25	26	27	28	29	30	31	32	33	34	35	Owners	Pts
2004	Billy Parker	66	Dodge	DAY	CAR	LVS; 28	DAR	BRI	TEX; 26	NSH	TAL	CAL; 22	GTY; 43	RCH	NZH	CLT; 43	DOV; 42	NSH	KEN; 24	MLW	DAY	CHI; 37																	34th	1718
2004	Jamie McMurray	66	Dodge																				NHA; 22	PPR	IRP		BRI; 23	CAL; 5	RCH	DOV	KAN	CLT; 8	MEM	ATL; 36		DAR; 1	HOM; 2		34th	1718
2004	Rusty Wallace	66	Dodge																							MCH; 6									PHO; 7				34th	1718
2005	Jeremy Mayfield	64	Dodge	DAY; 21			LVS; 24			BRI; 6			TAL; 42			CLT; 38					DAY; 11	CHI; 39						MCH; 23		CAL; 27									17th	3622
2005	Jamie McMurray	64	Dodge		CAL; 7			ATL; 9	NSH; 11		TEX; 28	PHO; 36		DAR; 40	RCH; 33		DOV; 3						NHA; 5				GLN; 26		BRI; 8		RCH; 37			CLT; 16			PHO; 18		17th	3622
2005	Rusty Wallace	64	Dodge			MXC; 6													KEN; 24						GTY; 37							DOV; 7	KAN; 13			TEX; 27			17th	3622
2005	Bill Elliott	64	Dodge															NSH; 23		MLW; 17				PPR; 6															17th	3622
2005	Mike Wallace	64	Dodge																							IRP; 10												HOM; 12	17th	3622
2005	Steve Wallace	64	Dodge																																MEM; 15				17th	3622
2006	Jamie McMurray	64	Dodge	DAY; 16	CAL; 5	MXC; 10	LVS; 7	ATL; 9		TEX; 15		PHO; 10	TAL; 36		DAR; 3	CLT; 43					DAY; 11	CHI; 40	NHA; 32				GLN; 3		BRI; 30	CAL; 17	RCH; 11	DOV; 4		CLT; 31			PHO; 15		16th	3610
2006	Steve Wallace	64	Dodge						BRI; 33		NSH; 12			RCH; 28			DOV; 38	NSH; 15	KEN; 11	MLW; 25				MAR; 35	GTY; 31	IRP; 20		MCH; 24					KAN; 24		MEM; 20	TEX; 31		HOM; 22	16th	3610
2007	Steve Wallace	66	Dodge	DAY; 30	CAL; 22	MXC; 18	LVS; 17	ATL; 35	BRI; 31	NSH; 14	TEX; 32	PHO; 29	TAL; 26	RCH; 32	DAR; 39	CLT; 30	DOV; 22	NSH; 12	KEN; 22	MLW; 27	NHA; 15	DAY; 39	CHI; 32	GTY; 28	IRP; 17	CGV; 32	GLN; 34	MCH; 37	BRI; 32	CAL; 25	RCH; 18	DOV; 22	KAN; 37		MEM; 35	TEX; 23	PHO; 37	HOM; 34	30th	2840
2007	Reed Sorenson	66	Dodge																															CLT; 25					30th	2840
2008	Steve Wallace	66	Chevy	DAY; 37	CAL; 15	LVS; 30	ATL; 18	BRI; 16	NSH; 24	TEX; 16	PHO; 16	MXC; 10	TAL; 32	RCH; 5	DAR; 5	CLT; 20	DOV; 11	NSH; 21	KEN; 17	MLW; 19	NHA; 21	DAY; 13	CHI; 24	GTY; 26	IRP; 10	CGV; 10	GLN; 28	MCH; 38	BRI; 10	CAL; 20	RCH; 17	DOV; 18	KAN; 41	CLT; 32	MEM; 9	TEX; 28	PHO; 33	HOM; 15	20th	3615
2009	Steve Wallace	66	Chevy	DAY; 42	CAL; 10	LVS; 30	BRI; 7	TEX; 14	NSH; 9	PHO; 12	TAL; 34	RCH; 11	DAR; 14	CLT; 17	DOV; 29	NSH; 7	KEN; 14	MLW; 6	NHA; 11	DAY; 12	CHI; 16	GTY; 24	IRP; 5	IOW; 17	GLN; 12	MCH; 15	BRI; 17	CGV; 16	ATL; 23	RCH; 9	DOV; 12	KAN; 15	CAL; 29	CLT; 31	MEM; 20	TEX; 21	PHO; 10	HOM; 8	13th	4007
2010	Steve Wallace	66	Toyota	DAY; 10	CAL; 6	LVS; 10	BRI; 38	NSH; 36	PHO; 30	TEX; 9	TAL; 39	RCH; 17	DAR; 12	DOV; 14	CLT; 21	NSH; 8	KEN; 6	ROA; 9	NHA; 11	DAY; 15	CHI; 12	GTY; 5	IRP; 10	IOW; 6	GLN; 9	MCH; 18	BRI; 30	CGV; 38	ATL; 35	RCH; 16	DOV; 12	KAN; 11	CAL; 33	CLT; 29	GTY; 12	TEX; 10	PHO; 10	HOM; 15	11th	3940
2011	Steve Wallace	66	Toyota	DAY; 20	PHO; 30	LVS; 16	BRI; 11	CAL; 27	TEX; 17	TAL; 32	NSH; 17	RCH; 11	DAR; 5	DOV; 16	IOW; 11	CLT; 7	CHI; 12	MCH; 14	ROA; 26	DAY; 11	KEN; 21	NHA; 9	NSH; 11	IRP; 30	IOW; 8	GLN; 16	CGV; 4	BRI; 14	ATL; 13	RCH; 16	CHI; 18	DOV; 20	KAN; 20	CLT; 13	TEX; 18	PHO; 29	HOM; 34		17th	921
2013	Steve Wallace	66	Ford	DAY	PHO	LVS	BRI	CAL	TEX	RCH	TAL	DAR	CLT; 25	DOV	IOW	MCH	ROA	KEN	DAY	NHA	CHI	IND	IOW	GLN	MOH	BRI	ATL	RCH	CHI	KEN	DOV	KAN	CLT	TEX	PHO	HOM			58th	19

== Sprint Cup Series ==
In 2011, Rusty Wallace Racing acquired the owner's points of the No. 77 Penske Racing team, guaranteeing Steve Wallace a start in the 2011 Daytona 500. Wallace drove the No. 77 car, which was sponsored by 5-hour Energy, to a 20th-place finish.

=== Car No. 77 results ===
NASCAR Sprint Cup Series results
Year	Team	No.	Make	1	2	3	4	5	6	7	8	9	10	11	12	13	14	15	16	17	18	19	20	21	22	23	24	25	26	27	28	29	30	31	32	33	34	35	36	NSCC	Pts
2011	Steve Wallace	77	Toyota	DAY; 20	PHO	LVS	BRI	CAL	MAR	TEX	TAL	RCH	DAR	DOV	CLT	KAN	POC	MCH	SON	DAY	KEN	NHA	IND	POC	GLN	MCH	BRI	ATL	RCH	CHI	NHA	DOV	KAN	CLT	TAL	MAR	TEX	PHO	HOM	50th	24
