= Billy Parker (racing driver) =

American racing driver

- Born: January 9, 1977 (age 49); Denver, North Carolina, U.S.

NASCAR O'Reilly Auto Parts Series career
- 11 races run over 3 years
- Best finish: 59th (2004)
- First race: 2000 Sam's Town 250 (Memphis)
- Last race: 2004 Tropicana Twister 300 (Chicagoland)
| Wins | Top tens | Poles |
|---|---|---|
| 0 | 0 | 0 |

Billy “Catfish” Parker (born January 9, 1977) is an American former NASCAR Busch Series driver. He is the younger brother of Busch series veteran Hank Parker Jr. and son of professional fisherman Hank Parker. Parker comes from running both dirt and asphalt across the south after getting his start in Go-Karts.

== Early life ==
Parker was born on January 9, 1977 in Denver, North Carolina. The son of Martha Parker, and Hank Parker. His is the younger brother of Hank Parker Jr., and the twin brother of Ben Parker.

== Career ==
In 2004 Busch, he joined Rusty Wallace, Inc., driving the No. 66 Duraflame Dodge for 17 races. However he would last 8 races before being released after a crash at Chicagoland Speedway, which would end his racing career.

== Motorsports career results ==
=== NASCAR ===
(key) (Bold – Pole position awarded by qualifying time. Italics – Pole position earned by points standings or practice time. * – Most laps led.)

==== Busch Series ====
NASCAR Busch Series results
| Year | Team | No. | Make | 1 | 2 | 3 | 4 | 5 | 6 | 7 | 8 | 9 | 10 | 11 | 12 | 13 | 14 | 15 | 16 | 17 | 18 | 19 | 20 | 21 | 22 | 23 | 24 | 25 | 26 | 27 | 28 | 29 | 30 | 31 | 32 | 33 | 34 | NBSC | Pts | Ref |
|---|---|---|---|---|---|---|---|---|---|---|---|---|---|---|---|---|---|---|---|---|---|---|---|---|---|---|---|---|---|---|---|---|---|---|---|---|---|---|---|---|
| 2000 | Whitaker Racing | 35 | Chevy | DAY | CAR | LVS | ATL | DAR | BRI | TEX | NSV | TAL | CAL | RCH | NHA | CLT | DOV | SBO | MYB | GLN | MLW | NZH | PPR | GTY | IRP | MCH | BRI | DAR | RCH | DOV | CLT | CAR | MEM; 35 | PHO | HOM | | | 105th | 58 | |
| 2001 | ppc Racing | 15 | Ford | DAY | CAR | LVS | ATL | DAR | BRI | TEX | NSH | TAL | CAL | RCH | NHA | NZH | CLT | DOV | KEN | MLW; 25 | GLN | CHI | GTY | PPR | IRP; 35 | MCH | BRI | DAR | RCH | DOV | KAN | CLT | MEM | PHO | CAR | HOM | | 109th | 88 | |
| 2004 | Rusty Wallace Inc. | 66 | Dodge | DAY | CAR | LVS; 28 | DAR | BRI | TEX; 26 | NSH | TAL | CAL; 22 | GTY; 43 | RCH | NZH | CLT; 43 | DOV; 42 | NSH | KEN; 24 | MLW | DAY | CHI; 37 | NHA | PPR | IRP | MCH | BRI | CAL | RCH | DOV | KAN | CLT | MEM | ATL | PHO | DAR | HOM | 59th | 514 | |
