= 2004 Tropicana Twister 300 =

Race details
- Map of Speedway
- Date: July 10, 2004
- Official name: 2004 Tropicana Twister 400
- Location: Chicagoland Speedway in Joliet, Illinois
- Course: Tri-oval
- Course length: 2.4 km (1.5 miles)
- Distance: 200 laps, 300 mi (480 km)
- Weather: Sunny
- Average speed: 126.790 mph (204.049 km/h)
- Attendance: 70,000

Pole position
Driver	Bobby Hamilton Jr.	Team Rensi Motorsports
- Time: 29.410

Most laps led
Driver	Kyle Busch	Hendrick Motorsports
- Laps: 49

Winner
No. 44	Justin Labonte	Labonte Motorsports

Television in the United States
- Network: NBC
- Announcers: Allen Bestwick, Wally Dallenbach Jr., Benny Parsons

The 2004 Tropicana Twister 300 was a NASCAR Busch Series race held on July 10, 2004, at Chicagoland Speedway in Joliet, Illinois. The race was the 4th iteration of the event. The race was the 19th race of the 2004 NASCAR Busch Series. Bobby Hamilton Jr. won the pole while rookie sensation Kyle Busch led the most laps at 49. But the race became most notable for two reasons. One being the most infamous one where a big inflatable Tropicana Orange made its way onto the race track during Todd Szegedy's qualifying run. And the second being one of the biggest upset winners in NASCAR history as Justin Labonte, the son of Terry Labonte and the nephew of Bobby Labonte, won his first and only Busch Series race after he had not scored a top 10 in 31 career Busch Series starts as he beat out the fuel strategy game at the end of the race.

== Background ==
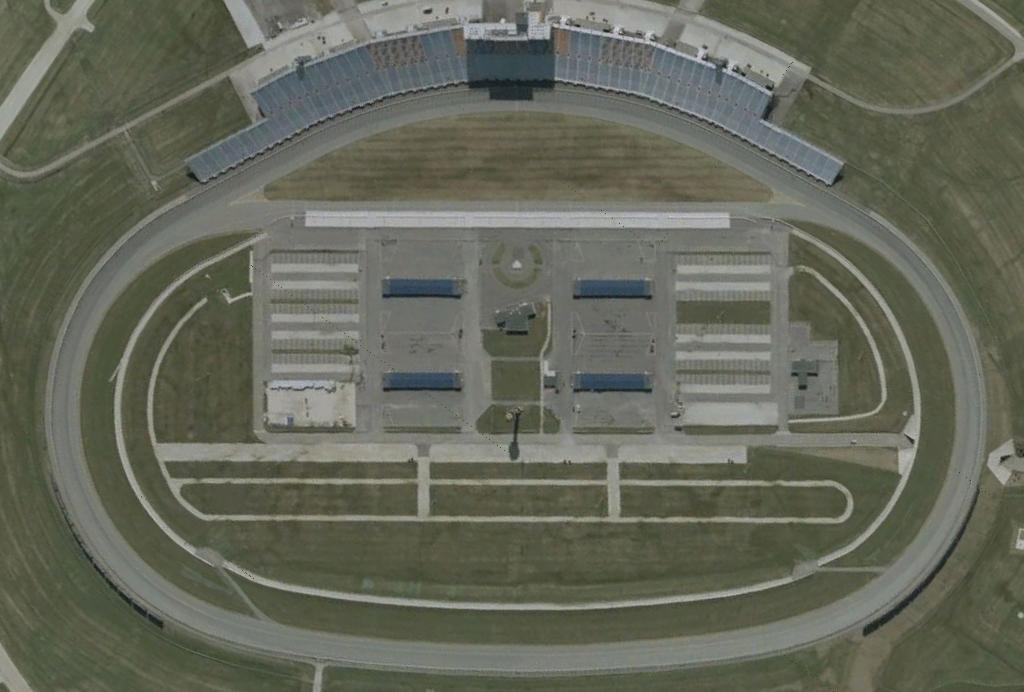
Chicagoland Speedway, the track where the race will be held.

Chicagoland Speedway is a 1.5 miles (2.4 km) tri-oval speedway in Joliet, Illinois, southwest of Chicago. The speedway opened in 2001 and currently hosts NASCAR racing. Until 2011, the speedway also hosted the IndyCar Series, recording numerous close finishes including the closest finish in IndyCar history. The speedway is owned and operated by International Speedway Corporation and located adjacent to Route 66 Raceway.

=== Entry list ===
- (R) denotes rookie driver

#	Driver	Team	Make
00	Jason Leffler	Haas CNC Racing	Chevrolet
1	Jamie McMurray	Phoenix Racing	Dodge
02	Hermie Sadler	SCORE Motorsports	Chevrolet
2	Ron Hornaday Jr.	Richard Childress Racing	Chevrolet
4	Mike Wallace	Biagi Brothers Racing	Ford
5	Kyle Busch (R)	Hendrick Motorsports	Chevrolet
07	Carl Long	Moy Racing	Ford
7	Todd Szegedy	NEMCO Motorsports	Chevrolet
8	Martin Truex Jr.	Chance 2 Motorsports	Chevrolet
9	Jeff Burton	Roush Racing	Ford
10	Gus Wasson	Davis Motorsports	Chevrolet
12	Tim Fedewa	FitzBradshaw Racing	Chevrolet
14	Casey Atwood	FitzBradshaw Racing	Chevrolet
17	Matt Kenseth	Reiser Enterprises	Ford
18	J. J. Yeley (R)	Joe Gibbs Racing	Chevrolet
20	Mike Bliss	Joe Gibbs Racing	Chevrolet
21	Kevin Harvick	Richard Childress Racing	Chevrolet
22	Jason Keller	ppc Racing	Ford
23	Kenny Wallace	Bill Davis Racing	Chevrolet
24	Steve Grissom	GIC-Mixon Motorsports	Chevrolet
25	Bobby Hamilton Jr.	Team Rensi Motorsports	Ford
27	Johnny Sauter	Brewco Motorsports	Chevrolet
29	Ricky Craven	Richard Childress Racing	Chevrolet
31	Todd Bodine	Marsh Racing	Ford
32	David Stremme	Braun Racing	Dodge
33	Clint Bowyer (R)	Andy Petree Racing	Chevrolet
35	Kenny Hendrick	Gary Keller Racing	Chevrolet
36	Travis Geisler	DCT Motorsports	Chevrolet
37	David Green	Brewco Motorsports	Chevrolet
38	Kasey Kahne	Akins Motorsports	Dodge
39	Tina Gordon	Jay Robinson Racing	Ford
44	Justin Labonte	Labonte Motorsports	Dodge
46	Ashton Lewis Jr.	Lewis Motorsports	Chevrolet
47	Robert Pressley	ST Motorsports	Ford
49	Derrike Cope	Jay Robinson Racing	Ford
50	Regan Smith	Holigan Racing	Chevrolet
51	Blake Mallory	Ware Racing Enterprises	Chevrolet
55	Robby Gordon	Robby Gordon Motorsports	Chevrolet
56	Kevin Conway	Mac Hill Motorsports	Chevrolet
59	Stacy Compton	ST Motorsports	Ford
60	Greg Biffle	Roush Racing	Ford
62	Larry Hollenbeck	S.W.A.T. Racing	Chevrolet
66	Billy Parker (R)	Rusty Wallace Inc.	Dodge
72	Kevin Lepage	MacDonald Motorsports	Chevrolet
74	Tony Raines	BACE Motorsports	Chevrolet
77	Jimmy Kitchens	Moy Racing	Ford
87	Joe Nemechek	NEMCO Motorsports	Chevrolet
88	Jeff Fuller	NEMCO Motorsports	Chevrolet
91	Stanton Barrett	Stanton Barrett Motorsports	Chevrolet
99	Michael Waltrip	Michael Waltrip Racing	Chevrolet
Official Entry list

== Qualifying ==
Bobby Hamilton Jr. won the pole with a time of 29.410 and a speed of 183.611 mph. But during qualifying, it was a really windy day which led to one of the most infamous and weirdest moments in NASCAR history. Todd Szegedy was about to make his qualifying run attempting to qualify for his 2nd Busch Series race. A big gust of wind came through and it ended up breaking the straps that were holding the big inflatable Tropicana Oranges off and the oranges went loose. One orange got ripped apart and landed on the infield spectator area on someone's RV where four people were covered by the orange. Another orange also made its way onto the race track. Szegedy was on his first lap when he was making his way through turns 3 and 4 when he was shocked and startled to see a big inflatable tropicana orange rolling on the apron of the race track. Szegedy went by it very easily without incident. NASCAR immeadietly stopped qualifying to get the orange off the track. Track crews attempted to use the truck with a powerful blower to blow the orange off the track. Unfortunetly, the orange would rip apart and get stuck on the turn 1 catchfence in which they had to take it down by hand. They would but a storm front made its way onto the track which caused a further delay. Qualifying was stopped for about an hour and a half before the track dried and qualifying got going again. Szegedy was granted a re-run by NASCAR and ended up qualifying 12th. Szegedy even joked about it afterwards saying "I used to like orange juice. Now it almost killed me."

=== Starting grid ===
Grid	No.	Driver	Team	Manufacturer
1	25	Bobby Hamilton Jr.	Team Rensi Motorsports	Ford
2	5	Kyle Busch (R)	Hendrick Motorsports	Chevrolet
3	87	Joe Nemechek	NEMCO Motorsports	Chevrolet
4	17	Matt Kenseth	Reiser Enterprises	Ford
5	21	Kevin Harvick	Richard Childress Racing	Chevrolet
6	20	Mike Bliss	Joe Gibbs Racing	Chevrolet
7	38	Kasey Kahne	Akins Motorsports	Dodge
8	60	Greg Biffle	Roush Racing	Ford
9	18	J. J. Yeley (R)	Joe Gibbs Racing	Chevrolet
10	55	Robby Gordon	Robby Gordon Motorsports	Chevrolet
11	32	David Stremme	Braun Racing	Dodge
12	7	Todd Szegedy	NEMCO Motorsports	Chevrolet
13	37	David Green*	Brewco Motorsports	Chevrolet
14	29	Ricky Craven	Richard Childress Racing	Chevrolet
15	31	Todd Bodine	Marsh Racing	Ford
16	8	Martin Truex Jr.	Chance 2 Motorsports	Chevrolet
17	9	Jeff Burton	Roush Racing	Ford
18	12	Tim Fedewa	FitzBradshaw Racing	Chevrolet
19	23	Kenny Wallace	Bill Davis Racing	Chevrolet
20	00	Jason Leffler	Haas CNC Racing	Chevrolet
21	50	Regan Smith	Holigan Racing	Chevrolet
22	74	Tony Raines*	BACE Motorsports	Chevrolet
23	22	Jason Keller	ppc Racing	Ford
24	27	Johnny Sauter*	Brewco Motorsports	Chevrolet
25	46	Ashton Lewis	Lewis Motorsports	Chevrolet
26	1	Jamie McMurray	Phoenix Racing	Dodge
27	99	Michael Waltrip	Michael Waltrip Racing	Chevrolet
28	66	Billy Parker (R)	Rusty Wallace Inc.	Dodge
29	2	Ron Hornaday	Richard Childress Racing	Chevrolet
30	14	Casey Atwood	FitzBradshaw Racing	Chevrolet
31	72	Kevin Lepage	MacDonald Motorsports	Chevrolet
32	36	Travis Geisler	RCT Motorsports	Chevrolet
33	59	Stacy Compton*	ST Motorsports	Ford
34	44	Justin Labonte	Labonte Motorsports	Dodge
35	4	Mike Wallace	Biagi Brothers Racing	Ford
36	49	Derrike Cope	Jay Robinson Racing	Ford
37	35	Kenny Hendrick	Gary Keller Racing	Chevrolet
38	02	Hermie Sadler	SCORE Motorsports	Chevrolet
39	47	Robert Pressley	ST Motorsports	Ford
40	33	Clint Bowyer (R)	Andy Petree Racing	Chevrolet
41	10	Gus Wasson	Davis Motorsports	Chevrolet
42	39	Tina Gordon	Jay Robinson Racing	Ford
43	24	Steve Grissom	GIC-Mixon Motorsports	Chevrolet
Failed to Qualify, withdrew, or driver changes
44	88	Jeff Fuller	NEMCO Motorsports	Chevrolet
45	51	Blake Mallory	Ware Racing Enterprises	Chevrolet
46	91	Stanton Barrett	Stanton Barrett Motorsports	Chevrolet
47	77	Jimmy Kitchens	Moy Racing	Ford
48	07	Carl Long	Moy Racing	Ford
49	62	Larry Hollenbeck	S.W.A.T. Racing	Chevrolet
50	56	Kevin Conway	Mac Hill Motorsports	Chevrolet
Official Starting grid

* - Johnny Sauter, David Green, Stacy Compton, and Tony Raines all had to start at the rear of the field due to an engine change.

== Race ==
Pole sitter Bobby Hamilton Jr. led the first lap of the race. The first caution did not take long as it came out on lap 2 when rookie Billy Parker crashed in turn 1. The race would restart on lap 6. On the restart, Kyle Busch took the lead from Hamilton Jr. Unfortunetly for Bobby Hamilton Jr., his engine would give out on lap 9 of the race which would end his chances of winning. On lap 40, Kyle Busch handed the lead to Matt Kenseth as he came in to pit. On lap 44, the second caution would fly for debris in turn 1. Robby Gordon won the race off of pit road and he led the field to the restart on lap 49. On lap 55, Matt Kenseth challenged Robby Gordon for the lead and led that lap but could not pass him. The third caution flew on lap 56 for debris. On lap 61, Matt Kenseth took the lead. On lap 63, the fourth caution flew when Todd Szegedy crashed in turn 2. The race would restart on lap 68. On lap 91, Matt Kenseth decided to pit early and handed the lead to Mike Bliss. On lap 115 during green flag pitstops, the 5th caution flew when Robert Pressley spun in turn 3. Michael Waltrip won the race off of pit road and he led the field to the restart on lap 124. On lap 125, Mike Bliss would retake the lead. On lap 129, the 6th caution flew for debris. Justin Labonte was the new leader and he led the field to the restart on lap 134. On lap 139, the 6th caution would fly when Regan Smith spun down the frontstretch.

=== Final laps ===
Kyle Busch would be the new leader and he led the field to the restart on lap 144. With 46 laps to go, J. J. Yeley took the lead from Busch. With 23 to go, Greg Biffle challenged Yeley for the lead and led that lap but couldn't pass Yeley. But with 21 to go, Biffle's waterline broke and his car got into his own water in turns 1 and 2 and slid up the track into the outside wall bringing out the 8th and final caution of the day. Many drivers pitted while some others stayed out including Mike Wallace, Justin Labonte, Robby Gordon, Jason Keller, Ashton Lewis, and Jeff Burton. Wallace led the field to the restart with 15 to go. Wallace got a sizeable lead over Labonte. Wallace was saving fuel as much as he could in order for him to win the race. Wallace was looking for his 2nd win in a row after he won last week at Daytona. If Wallace saves enough fuel he will win the race. Labonte was racing side by side with the lapped car in Tim Fedewa and was trying to get past him for a few laps. Eventually, Labonte would pass him and Labonte would start to close in on Wallace with around 10 to go. Wallace started slowing down a lot to save fuel until he saw Labonte in his review mirror and decided to push it with around 5 to go. Labonte stayed behind Wallace hoping Wallace would either slip up or run out of gas. One of which would eventually happen. Mike Wallace saved as much fuel as he could, but did not save enough. As soon as they took the white flag when they crossed the start-finish line, Wallace's car started to slow down. Mike Wallace's car ran out of fuel after 70 laps since he last got it full giving the lead to Justin Labonte. Behind Labonte about a second back was Jason Keller. Labonte had plenty of fuel left and Justin Labonte would score his first ever victory in the Busch Series and Keller would finish in 2nd. Justin Labonte had no top 10 finishes in his first 30 starts in his Busch Series career from 1999-July 2004 and goes out and wins in his 31st start. Labonte's father Terry was there to celebrate with his son. Terry was proud with his son's first win calling it awesome. Justin Labonte would race full time in 2005 but only scored 2 top 10's and making 1 more start for Hendrick Motorsports in 2006 before deciding not to race in NASCAR again as he failed to make it to the Cup Series. Labonte's upset is still considered by some as one of the best upset victories in NASCAR history. Jeff Burton, Kasey Kahne, and Ashton Lewis rounded out the top 5 while Robby Gordon, Jason Leffler, David Green, J. J. Yeley, and Ron Hornaday would round out the top 10.

== Race results ==
Pos	Car	Driver	Team	Manufacturer	Laps Run	Laps Led	Status	Points
1	44	Justin Labonte	Labonte Motorsports	Dodge	200	1	running	185
2	22	Jason Keller	ppc Racing	Ford	200	0	running	170
3	9	Jeff Burton	Roush Racing	Ford	200	0	running	165
4	38	Kasey Kahne	Akins Motorsports	Dodge	200	0	running	160
5	46	Ashton Lewis	Lewis Motorsports	Chevrolet	200	0	running	155
6	55	Robby Gordon	Robby Gordon Motorsports	Chevrolet	200	14	running	155
7	00	Jason Leffler	Haas CNC Racing	Chevrolet	200	0	running	146
8	37	David Green	Brewco Motorsports	Chevrolet	200	0	running	142
9	18	J. J. Yeley (R)	Joe Gibbs Racing	Chevrolet	200	25	running	143
10	2	Ron Hornaday	Richard Childress Racing	Chevrolet	200	0	running	134
11	29	Ricky Craven	Richard Childress Racing	Chevrolet	200	0	running	130
12	5	Kyle Busch (R)	Hendrick Motorsports	Chevrolet	200	49	running	137
13	14	Casey Atwood	FitzBradshaw Racing	Chevrolet	200	0	running	124
14	8	Martin Truex Jr.	Chance 2 Motorsports	Chevrolet	200	0	running	121
15	4	Mike Wallace	Biagi Brothers Racing	Ford	200	18	running	123
16	17	Matt Kenseth	Reiser Enterprises	Ford	200	36	running	120
17	12	Tim Fedewa	FitzBradshaw Racing	Chevrolet	199	0	running	112
18	99	Michael Waltrip	Michael Waltrip Racing	Chevrolet	199	6	running	114
19	27	Johnny Sauter	Brewco Motorsports	Chevrolet	199	0	running	106
20	74	Tony Raines	BACE Motorsports	Chevrolet	198	0	running	103
21	59	Stacy Compton	ST Motorsprots	Ford	198	0	running	100
22	72	Kevin Lepage	MacDonald Motorsports	Chevrolet	198	0	running	97
23	36	Travis Geisler	DCT Motorsports	Chevrolet	198	0	running	94
24	31	Todd Bodine	Marsh Racing	Ford	197	0	running	91
25	02	Hermie Sadler	SCORE Motorsports	Chevrolet	196	0	running	88
26	50	Regan Smith	Holigan Racing	Chevrolet	196	0	running	85
27	1	Jamie McMurray	Phoenix Racing	Dodge	196	0	running	82
28	24	Steve Grissom	GIC-Mixon Racing	Chevrolet	195	0	running	79
29	10	Gus Wasson	Davis Motorsports	Chevrolet	194	0	running	76
30	39	Tina Gordon	Jay Robinson Racing	Ford	192	0	running	73
31	87	Joe Nemechek	NEMCO Motorsports	Chevrolet	188	0	engine	70
32	60	Greg Biffle	Roush Racing	Ford	184	3	overheating	72
33	20	Mike Bliss	Joe Gibbs Racing	Chevrolet	140	32	engine	69
34	32	David Stremme	Braun Racing	Dodge	125	0	vibration	61
35	47	Robert Pressley	ST Motorsports	Ford	123	0	engine	58
36	23	Kenny Wallace	Bill Davis Racing	Chevrolet	91	0	engine	55
37	66	Billy Parker (R)	Rusty Wallace Inc.	Dodge	64	0	crash	52
38	49	Derrike Cope	Jay Robinson Racing	Ford	60	0	engine	49
39	7	Todd Szegedy	NEMCO Motorsports	Chevrolet	60	0	crash	46
40	35	Kenny Hendrick	Gary Keller Racing	Chevrolet	25	0	transmission	43
41	21	Kevin Harvick	Richard Childress Racing	Chevrolet	22	0	vibration	40
42	33	Clint Bowyer (R)	Andy Petree Racing	Chevrolet	17	0	rear end	37
43	25	Bobby Hamilton Jr.	Team Rensi Motorsports	Ford	8	5	engine	39
Official Race results

Previous race: 2004 Winn-Dixie 250	NASCAR Busch Series; 2004 season	Next race: 2004 Siemens 200
