= 2010 Aaron's 312 =

Race details
- Map of Speedway
- Date: April 25, 2010
- Official name: 2010 Aaron's 312
- Location: Talladega Superspeedway in Lincoln, Alabama
- Course: Permanent racing facility
- Course length: 2.66 miles (4.28 km)
- Distance: 120 laps, 319 mi (513.381 km)
- Scheduled distance: 117 laps, 311.2 mi (500.83 km)
- Weather: Partly Cloudy
- Average speed: 157.630 mph (253.681 km/h)
- Attendance: 71,500

Pole position
Driver	Kevin Harvick	Kevin Harvick Inc.
- Time: 51.106

Most laps led
Driver	Kevin Harvick	Kevin Harvick Inc.
- Laps: 51

Winner
No. 22	Brad Keselowski	Penske Racing

Television in the United States
- Network: ESPN2
- Announcers: Marty Reid, Dale Jarrett, Andy Petree

The 2010 Aaron's 312 was a NASCAR Nationwide Series race held at Talladega Superspeedway in Lincoln, Alabama. The race was a double-header to the NASCAR Sprint Cup Series race that took place earlier on the same day due to rain that occurred the day before. The race was the 8th of the 2010 NASCAR Nationwide Series season. Kevin Harvick won the pole and led the most laps but the race was won by Brad Keselowski who made a last lap pass after a spectacular last lap crash.

== Background ==
Talladega Superspeedway, the race track where the race was held.

The track, Talladega Superspeedway, is one of six superspeedways to hold NASCAR races, the others being Daytona International Speedway, Auto Club Speedway, Indianapolis Motor Speedway, Pocono Raceway and Michigan International Speedway. The standard track at the speedway is a four-turn superspeedway that is 2.66 miles (4.28 km) long. The track's turns are banked at thirty-three degrees, while the front stretch, the location of the finish line, is banked at 16.5 degrees. The back stretch has a two-degree banking. Talladega Superspeedway can seat up to 143,231 people.

=== Entry list ===
- (R) denotes rookie driver

#	Driver	Team	Make
0	Chrissy Wallace	JD Motorsports	Chevrolet
01	Mike Wallace	JD Motorsports	Chevrolet
1	James Buescher (R)	Phoenix Racing	Chevrolet
04	Jeremy Clements	JD Motorsports	Chevrolet
05	Willie Allen	Day Enterprise Racing	Chevrolet
6	Ricky Stenhouse Jr. (R)	Roush Fenway Racing	Ford
7	Steve Arpin	JR Motorsports	Chevrolet
09	Patrick Sheltra	RAB Racing	Ford
10	Reed Sorenson	Braun Racing	Toyota
11	Brian Scott (R)	Braun Racing	Toyota
12	Justin Allgaier	Penske Racing	Dodge
15	Michael Annett	Germain Racing	Toyota
16	Colin Braun (R)	Roush Fenway Racing	Ford
18	Kyle Busch	Joe Gibbs Racing	Toyota
20	Joey Logano	Joe Gibbs Racing	Toyota
21	Clint Bowyer	Richard Childress Racing	Chevrolet
22	Brad Keselowski	Penske Racing	Dodge
23	Robert Richardson Jr.	R3 Motorsports	Chevrolet
24	Eric McClure	Team Rensi Motorsports	Ford
26	Brian Keselowski	K-Automotive Motorsports	Dodge
27	Scott Wimmer	Baker Curb Racing	Ford
28	Kenny Wallace	Jay Robinson Racing	Chevrolet
32	Brian Vickers	Braun Racing	Toyota
33	Kevin Harvick	Kevin Harvick Inc.	Chevrolet
34	Tony Raines	TriStar Motorsports	Chevrolet
35	Jason Keller	TriStar Motorsports	Chevrolet
38	Jason Leffler	Braun Racing	Toyota
40	Jeff Green	Key Motorsports	Chevrolet
42	Parker Kligerman	Team 42 Racing	Dodge
43	Scott Lagasse Jr.	Baker Curb Racing	Ford
49	Mark Green	Jay Robinson Racing	Chevrolet
52	Donnie Neuenberger	Means Racing	Chevrolet
56	Kevin Lepage	Mac Hill Motorsports	Chevrolet
60	Carl Edwards	Roush Fenway Racing	Ford
61	Josh Wise	Specialty Racing	Ford
62	Brendan Gaughan	Rusty Wallace Racing	Toyota
66	Steve Wallace	Rusty Wallace Racing	Toyota
70	Shelby Howard	ML Motorsports	Chevrolet
73	Derrike Cope	Stratus Racing Group Inc.	Dodge
75	Bobby Gerhart	Bob Schacht Motorsports	Chevrolet
81	Michael McDowell	MacDonald Motorsports	Dodge
83	Johnny Borneman III	Borneman Motorsports	Dodge
87	Joe Nemechek	NEMCO Motorsports	Chevrolet
88	Jamie McMurray	JR Motorsports	Chevrolet
89	Morgan Shepherd	Faith Motorsports	Chevrolet
92	Dennis Setzer	K-Automotive Motorsports	Dodge
98	Paul Menard	Roush Fenway Racing	Ford
99	Trevor Bayne	Diamond-Waltrip Racing	Toyota
Official Entry List

== Qualifying ==
Kevin Harvick won the pole with a time of 51.106 and a speed of 187.375.

Grid	No.	Driver	Team	Manufacturer	Time	Speed
1	33	Kevin Harvick	Kevin Harvick Inc.	Chevrolet	51.106	187.375
2	60	Carl Edwards	Roush Fenway Racing	Ford	51.552	185.754
3	6	Ricky Stenhouse Jr. (R)	Roush Fenway Racing	Ford	51.713	185.176
4	7	Steve Arpin	JR Motorsports	Chevrolet	51.723	185.140
5	70	Shelby Howard	ML Motorsports	Chevrolet	51.730	185.115
6	10	Reed Sorenson	Braun Racing	Toyota	51.765	184.990
7	38	Jason Leffler	Braun Racing	Toyota	51.811	184.826
8	98	Paul Menard	Roush Fenway Racing	Ford	51.845	184.704
9	42	Parker Kligerman	Team 42 Racing	Dodge	51.847	184.697
10	26	Brian Keselowski**	K-Automotive Motorsports	Dodge	51.856	184.665
11	18	Kyle Busch	Joe Gibbs Racing	Toyota	51.901	184.505
12	1	James Buescher (R)	Phoenix Racing	Chevrolet	51.962	184.289
13	16	Colin Braun (R)	Roush Fenway Racing	Ford	51.965	184.278
14	21	Clint Bowyer	Richard Childress Racing	Chevrolet	51.969	184.264
15	20	Joey Logano	Joe Gibbs Racing	Toyota	51.980	184.225
16	75	Bobby Gerhart	Bob Schacht Motorsports	Chevrolet	51.984	184.211
17	11	Brian Scott (R)	Braun Racing	Toyota	52.000	184.154
18	0	Chrissy Wallace	JD Motorsports	Chevrolet	52.000	184.154
19	12	Justin Allgaier	Penske Racing	Dodge	52.058	183.949
20	43	Scott Lagasse Jr.**	Baker Curb Racing	Ford	52.083	183.860
21	92	Dennis Setzer	K-Automotive Motorsports	Dodge	52.112	183.758
22	09	Patrick Sheltra	RAB Racing	Ford	52.126	183.709
23	22	Brad Keselowski	Penske Racing	Dodge	52.142	183.652
24	52	Donnie Neuenberger	Means Racing	Chevrolet	52.156	183.603
25	32	Brian Vickers	Braun Racing	Toyota	52.202	183.441
26	88	Jamie McMurray	JR Motorsports	Chevrolet	52.228	183.350
27	01	Mike Wallace	JD Motorsports	Chevrolet	52.252	183.266
28	89	Morgan Shepherd	Faith Motorsports	Chevrolet	52.267	183.213
29	15	Michael Annett	Germain Racing	Toyota	52.279	183.171
30	35	Jason Keller	TriStar Motorsports	Chevrolet	52.286	183.147
31	83	Johnny Borneman III	Borneman Motorsports	Dodge	52.324	183.014
32	81	Michael McDowell	MacDonald Motorsports	Dodge	52.335	182.975
33	66	Steve Wallace	Rusty Wallace Racing	Toyota	52.372	182.846
34	27	Scott Wimmer	Baker Curb Racing	Ford	52.426	182.657
35	87	Joe Nemechek	NEMCO Motorsports	Chevrolet	52.443	182.598
36	62	Brendan Gaughan	Rusty Wallace Racing	Toyota	52.498	182.407
37	34	Tony Raines	TriStar Motorsports	Chevrolet	52.580	182.122
38	28	Kenny Wallace*	Jay Robinson Racing	Chevrolet	52.697	181.718
39	99	Trevor Bayne*	Diamond-Waltrip Racing	Toyota	52.884	181.076
40	24	Eric McClure*	Team Rensi Motorsports	Ford	52.926	180.932
41	23	Robert Richardson Jr.*	R3 Motorsports	Chevrolet	53.170	180.102
42	40	Jeff Green* **	Key Motorsports	Chevrolet	53.173	180.091
43	49	Mark Green	Jay Robinson Racing	Chevrolet	52.327	183.003
Failed to Qualify, driver changes, or withdrew
44	56	Kevin Lepage	Mac Hill Motorsports	Chevrolet	52.471	182.501
45	05	Willie Allen	Day Enterprise Racing	Chevrolet	52.502	182.393
46	04	Jeremy Clements	JD Motorsports	Chevrolet	52.522	182.324
47	61	Josh Wise	Specialty Racing	Ford	52.562	182.185
48	73	Derrike Cope	Straus Racing Group Inc.	Dodge	52.677	181.787
Official Starting Lineup

* - Made the field via owner's points

** - Brian Keselowski, Jeff Green, and Scott Lagasse Jr. had to start at the rear of the field. Keselowski and Lagasse Jr. pitted before the green flag and Green had an engine change.

== Race ==
Pole sitter Kevin Harvick led the first lap of the race. On lap 8, Carl Edwards took the lead but Harvick took it back on the next lap. Edwards would take the lead on lap 12 with a push from Jamie McMurray. But on the next lap, McMurray took the lead from Edwards with a push from Harvick. On lap 20, the first of three big ones in the race would occur in the tri-oval that collected 13 cars. It started when Ricky Stenhouse Jr. was pushing Carl Edwards and Stenhouse hit Edwards at the wrong angle turning Edwards around and Edwards spun up right in front of the pack where he was nearly T-boned by Mike Wallace. The cars involved were Mike Wallace, Patrick Sheltra, James Buescher, Ricky Stenhouse Jr., Reed Sorenson, Michael Annett, Colin Braun, Clint Bowyer, Jason Leffler, Mark Green, Carl Edwards, Brendan Gaughan, and Steve Wallace. Kevin Harvick won the race off of pit road making him the new race leader. The race restarted on lap 29. On the restart, Kyle Busch took the lead from Harvick. Harvick would take the lead on lap 30 due to Busch and his drafting partner Brad Keselowski getting too far ahead of the pack and losing the draft causing them to lose momentum. On lap 31, Jamie McMurray took the lead from Harvick. Kyle Busch took the lead on lap 35. McMurray would take it back on the next lap. Brad Keselowski took the lead on lap 39. On lap 41, Joey Logano took the lead. On lap 44, McMurray took the lead but Keselowski would take it on the next lap. On lap 47, the second caution flew when Carl Edwards blew a right rear tire in turn 2 and almost caused another big crash as he spun in front of the pack. Fortunately, it was only Edwards who was involved. During pit stops, Joey Logano dragged his gas can out of his pit box and onto the racetrack which would be a very costly penalty for Logano. Eric McClure stayed out and he led the field to the restart on lap 51. Brad Keselowski would immeadeatly take the lead from McClure. But on that same lap, Patrick Sheltra took the lead from Keselowski. On lap 54, Brian Scott took the lead from Sheltra. On lap 55, Brad Keselowski took the lead. On lap 58, Kevin Harvick took the lead. On lap 59, Jamie McMurray took the lead. On lap 60, Kyle Busch took the lead from McMurray.

=== Final laps ===
With 48 laps to go, Paul Menard took the lead from Busch. With 46 to go, Kyle Busch took the lead from Menard. With 42 to go, Brad Keselowski took the lead. With 40 to go, Paul Menard took the lead from Keselowski. With 37 laps to go, Kevin Harvick took the lead and held onto it. With 30 to go, green flag pitstops began. With 25 to go, Kevin Harvick gave up the lead to Brendan Gaughan to make his pitstop and Gaughan was the new race leader. While they were coming to pit road, Kyle Busch got rear ended by Patrick Sheltra giving Busch rear end damage and ending his chances of winning. Gaughan soon gave it to Robert Richardson Jr. with 24 to go. After everything cycled through, Kevin Harvick retained his lead. Harvick was looking to become the first driver to win a NASCAR Nationwide and Sprint Cup Series race on the same day since Harvick won the Cup race earlier in the day. With 6 laps to go, Brad Keselowski made an attempt to pass Harvick for the lead but could not get in front of him. But with 4 laps to go, the third caution flew for the second big one on the frontstretch going into turn 1 that collected 7 cars. It started when Colin Braun got hooked by Steve Arpin and Braun turned down into Parker Kligerman in a wreck that also collected Arpin, Kyle Busch, Scott Lagasse Jr., Shelby Howard, and Morgan Shepherd. The wreck would set up a green-white-checkered finish. On the restart Harvick got out in front of Jamie McMurray, who Harvick beat in the earlier Cup race by .011 seconds, with a push from his Cup Series teammate Clint Bowyer. On the final lap, Harvick kept his lead but McMurray was looking for revenge and got a push from Brian Vickers down the backstretch and got side by side with Harvick. Vickers tried to duck below McMurray to pass him but McMurray blocked Vickers. But in turn 3, Brad Keselowski ducked to the outside of McMurray and Harvick with a push by Joey Logano and Keselowski took the lead from Harvick and McMurray. In turn 4, the third big one would occur that brought out the fourth and final caution in a crash that took out 20 cars. It started when Jamie McMurray attempted to get in front of Clint Bowyer but got hooked onto Bowyer's right front and spun in front of the pack. During the wreck, Paul Menard came up in front of Dennis Setzer and Setzer's car ramped onto Menard and the wall and struck the turn 4 catchfence with the front of the car ripping almost the whole front of the car and bursting it into flames. Setzer and everyone were ok. The cars involved were Chrissy Wallace, Steve Arpin, Patrick Sheltra, Brian Scott, Justin Allgaier, Clint Bowyer, Eric McClure, Scott Wimmer, Kenny Wallace, Brian Vickers, Tony Raines, Jeff Green, Scott Lagasse Jr., Brendan Gaughan, Bobby Gerhart, Michael McDowell, Jamie McMurray, Dennis Setzer, Paul Menard, and Trevor Bayne. Brad Keselowski was in front when the caution came out and he was the race winner. The win would be Keselowski's first of 6 wins in 2010 en route to his first Nationwide Series Championship. The top 10 from the race featured some surprises. Joey Logano, Kevin Harvick, Jason Keller, and Johnny Borneman III rounded out the top 5 while Clint Bowyer, Tony Raines, Paul Menard, Brian Vickers, and Brian Scott rounded out the top 10. This would be Keller's first top 5 finish since 2008 and his final top 5 of his Nationwide Series career after he failed to qualify 3 of the first 7 races of 2010 with a 4th-place finish. Keller's teammate Tony Raines finished 7th giving owner Mark Smith, the owner of TriStar Motorsports, his first top 5 and top 10 finish of the team's Nationwide Series career. Raines would score another top 10 at Gateway later in the year for Smith. This would be Johnny Borneman III's first and only top 5 finish of his Nationwide Series career as he finished in 5th.

== Race results ==
Pos	Car	Driver	Team	Manufacturer	Laps Run	Laps Led	Status	Points
1	22	Brad Keselowski	Penske Racing	Dodge	120	11	running	140
2	20	Joey Logano	Joe Gibbs Racing	Toyota	120	3	running	175
3	33	Kevin Harvick	Kevin Harvick Inc.	Chevrolet	120	51	running	175
4	35	Jason Keller	TriStar Motorsports	Chevrolet	120	0	running	160
5	83	Johnny Borneman III	Borneman Motorsports	Dodge	120	0	running	155
6	21	Clint Bowyer	Richard Childress Racing	Chevrolet	120	0	running	150
7	34	Tony Raines	TriStar Motorsports	Chevrolet	120	0	running	146
8	98	Paul Menard	Roush-Fenway Racing	Ford	120	5	running	147
9	32	Brian Vickers	Braun Racing	Toyota	120	0	running	138
10	11	Brian Scott (R)	Braun Racing	Toyota	120	1	running	139
11	28	Kenny Wallace	Jay Robinson Racing	Chevrolet	120	0	running	130
12	27	Scott Wimmer	Baker Curb Racing	Ford	120	1	running	132
13	99	Trevor Bayne	Diamond-Waltrip Racing	Toyota	120	0	running	124
14	88	Jamie McMurray	JR Motorsports	Chevrolet	119	21	crash	126
15	12	Justin Allgaier	Penske Racing	Dodge	119	0	crash	118
16	40	Jeff Green	Key Motorsports	Chevrolet	119	0	crash	115
17	92	Dennis Setzer	K-Automotive Motorsports	Dodge	119	0	crash	112
18	09	Patrick Sheltra	RAB Racing	Ford	119	3	crash	114
19	70	Shelby Howard	ML Motorsports	Chevrolet	119	0	running	106
20	23	Robert Richardson Jr.	R3 Motorsports	Chevrolet	119	1	running	108
21	43	Scott Lagasse Jr.	Baker Curb Racing	Ford	119	0	running	100
22	24	Eric McClure	Team Rensi Racing	Ford	119	2	running	102
23	81	Michael McDowell	MacDonald Motorsports	Dodge	119	0	running	94
24	0	Chrissy Wallace	JD Motorsports	Chevrolet	119	0	running	91
25	75	Bobby Gerhart	Bob Schacht Motorsports	Chevrolet	118	0	crash	88
26	7	Steve Arpin	JR Motorsports	Chevrolet	118	0	crash	85
27	62	Brendan Gaughan	Rusty Wallace Racing	Toyota	118	2	crash	87
28	49	Mark Green	Jay Robinson Racing	Chevrolet	118	0	running	79
29	6	Ricky Stenhouse Jr. (R)	Roush Fenway Racing	Ford	118	0	running	76
30	89	Morgan Shepherd	Faith Motorsports	Chevrolet	118	0	running	73
31	42	Parker Kligerman	Team 42 Racing	Dodge	113	0	crash	70
32	16	Colin Braun (R)	Roush Fenway Racing	Ford	113	0	crash	67
33	26	Brian Keselowski	K-Automotive Motorsports	Dodge	113	1	running	69
34	18	Kyle Busch	Joe Gibbs Racing	Toyota	111	16	crash	66
35	60	Carl Edwards	Roush Fenway Racing	Ford	110	2	running	63
36	87	Joe Nemechek	NEMCO Motorsports	Chevrolet	74	0	overheating	55
37	1	James Buescher (R)	Phoenix Racing	Chevrolet	45	0	crash	52
38	52	Donnie Neuenberger	Means Racing	Chevrolet	42	0	engine	49
39	66	Steve Wallace	Rusty Wallace Racing	Toyota	23	0	crash	46
40	10	Reed Sorenson	Braun Racing	Toyota	20	0	crash	43
41	38	Jason Leffler	Braun Racing	Toyota	20	0	crash	40
42	01	Mike Wallace	JD Motorsports	Chevrolet	20	0	crash	37
43	15	Michael Annett	Germain Racing	Toyota	20	0	crash	34
Official Race results

Previous race: 2010 O'Reilly Auto Parts 300	NASCAR Nationwide Series; 2010 season	Next race: 2010 Bubba Burger 250
