= Brewco Motorsports =

Former NASCAR team

- Owner: Clarence Brewer Jr.
- Series: Nextel Cup Series; Busch Series; Truck Series
- Race drivers: Jamie McMurray; Greg Biffle; Ward Burton
- Manufacturer: Chevy (1995–2006); Pontiac (2001–2006); Ford (2005–2007)
- Opened: 1995
- Closed: 2007

Career
- Debut: Cup Series: 2004 Chevy Rock and Roll 400 (Richmond); Busch Series: 1995 Kroger 200 (IRP); Truck Series: 1997 NAPA Autocare 200 (Nazareth)
- Latest race: Cup Series: 2004 Chevy Rock and Roll 400 (Richmond); Busch Series: 2007 Ford 300 (Homestead); Truck Series: 1998 Sam's Town 250 (Las Vegas)
- Races competed: Total: 714; Cup Series: 1 Busch Series: 678; Truck Series: 35
- Drivers' Championships: Total: 0 Cup Series: 0 Busch Series: 0 Truck Series: 0
- Race victories: Total: 10; Cup Series: 0 Busch Series: 10; Truck Series: 0
- Pole positions: Total: 11; Cup Series: 0 Busch Series: 11; Truck Series: 0

Brewco Motorsports was a racing team that competed in the NASCAR Busch Series (now the Xfinity Series). The team was owned from 1995 until 2007 by Clarence Brewer Jr., his wife Tammy, and Todd Wilkerson. The team won 10 races over 13 seasons in the Busch Series, and entered a single NASCAR Nextel Cup Series race in 2004. The team was sold to Mike Curb and Gary Baker with nine races left in the 2007 season, with both Brewco entries becoming part of Baker-Curb Racing.

== NASCAR Nextel Cup Series ==
In 2004, Brewco Motorsports entered the Chevy Rock & Roll 400 at Richmond International Raceway, with David Green driving the No. 27 Chevrolet sponsored by Timber Wolf. Green qualified in 34th place, and finished 31st, three laps down. At the time, Green was driving the No. 37 for Brewco in the Busch Series, with Timber Wolf as the sponsor. This would be Brewco's only race in the NASCAR Nextel Cup Series.

Year	Driver	No.	Make	1	2	3	4	5	6	7	8	9	10	11	12	13	14	15	16	17	18	19	20	21	22	23	24	25	26	27	28	29	30	31	32	33	34	35	36	Owner	Pts
2004	David Green	27	Chevy	DAY	CAR	LVS	ATL	DAR	BRI	TEX	MAR	TAL	CAL	RCH	CLT	DOV	POC	MCH	SON	DAY	CHI	NHA	POC	IND	GLN	MCH	BRI	CAL	RCH; 31	NHA	DOV	TAL	KAN	CLT	MAR	ATL	PHO	DAR	HOM		

== NASCAR Busch Series ==
=== Car No. 37 History ===
Mark Green (1995-1998)

Brewco debuted at the Kroger 200 at Indianapolis Raceway Park in 1995, with Mark Green finishing 18th in the No. 41 car. Green finished 28th-place at Richmond the next month, but failed to qualify for the last two races of the season. In 1996, after gaining sponsorship from Timber Wolf, the team changed their number to 37 and ran ten races with Green, posting a top-ten finish at Myrtle Beach Speedway. The team finally went full-time in 1997, with Green chalking up five top-ten finishes and finishing just 79 points shy of a top-ten finish in points.

Kevin Grubb (1999-2001)

After the 1998 season yielded four top-ten's, Green left for Washington-Erving Motorsports, and was replaced by Kevin Grubb. Grubb failed to qualify four times, but finished fifth at Richmond and was seventeenth in points at season's end. Grubb improved four spots the next season, with six top-tens, and in 2001, he had seven finishes of ninth or better.

Jeff Purvis (2002)

For 2002 Grubb departed for Team Bristol Motorsports, and was replaced by Jeff Purvis. Purvis won at Texas Motor Speedway in April, but almost died six weeks later from a crash at Nazareth Speedway. Kevin Lepage took his place, and won two poles, before Elton Sawyer finished out the last three races of the year.

David Green #27/37 (2003-2006)

In 2003, the team switched from Chevrolet to Pontiac, and David Green (Mark's brother) took over the driving chores. The change was a success, as Green won three races and was runner-up in the championship standings in his first season with the team. After a winless 2004, in which the team drove a mixture of Chevrolets and Pontiacs, Brewco changed manufacturers to Ford, and moved the number 27 and its sponsor Kleenex to Green's team, with the existing No. 27 becoming the No. 66. In 2005, Green collected one win and finished eighth in the points, but in 2006, he struggled (finishing in the top 10 only twice), and was replaced by Casey Atwood late in the season.

Multiple drivers #27 (2007)

In 2007, Ward Burton, Jason Keller, Bobby East, and road course ringer Jorge Goeters split the No. 27 Ford Fusion, with sponsorship from Kimberly-Clark and State Water Heaters. Before the second Bristol race, Burton was replaced by Johnny Sauter, in what would be Brewco's final race. After Bristol, Brewer sold the team to Baker-Curb Racing.

==== Car No. 37 results ====
Year	Driver	No.	Make	1	2	3	4	5	6	7	8	9	10	11	12	13	14	15	16	17	18	19	20	21	22	23	24	25	26	27	28	29	30	31	32	33	34	35	Owners	Pts
1995	Mark Green	41	Chevy	DAY	CAR	RCH	ATL	NSV	DAR	BRI	HCY	NHA	NZH	CLT	DOV	MYB	GLN	MLW	TAL	SBO	IRP; 18	MCH	BRI	DAR	RCH; 28	DOV	CLT	CAR; DNQ	HOM; DNQ										73rd	188
1996	Mark Green	37	Chevy	DAY	CAR; 36	RCH; DNQ	ATL	NSV; 38	DAR	BRI	HCY; DNQ	NZH; 19	CLT	DOV	SBO; 28	MYB; 10	GLN	MLW; 19	NHA	TAL	IRP; 14	MCH	BRI	DAR	RCH; 13	DOV	CLT; DNQ	CAR; 21	HOM; 30										46th	947
1997	Mark Green	37	Chevy	DAY; 8	CAR; 14	RCH; 12	ATL; 13	LVS; 25	DAR; 19	HCY; 9	TEX; 34	BRI; 40	NSV; 21	TAL; 24	NHA; 22	NZH; 14	CLT; 19	DOV; 24	SBO; 23	GLN; 15	MLW; 15	MYB; 15	GTY; 8	IRP; 26	MCH; 12	BRI; 13	DAR; 22	RCH; 19	DOV; 11	CLT; 5	CAL; 41	CAR; 8	HOM; 18						11th	3261
1998	Mark Green	37	Chevy	DAY; 14	CAR; 9	LVS; 16	NSV; 34	DAR; 17	BRI; 17	TEX; 7	HCY; 22	TAL; 35	NHA; 20	NZH; 11	CLT; 15	DOV; 16	RCH; 21	PPR; 7	GLN; 33	MLW; 32	MYB; 9	CAL; 19	SBO; 21	IRP; 28	MCH; 38	BRI; 20	DAR; 28	RCH; 19	DOV; 23	CLT; 39	GTY; 21	CAR; 40	ATL; 12	HOM; 22					13th	3075
1999	Kevin Grubb	37	Chevy	DAY; 8	CAR; 16	LVS; DNQ	ATL; DNQ	DAR; DNQ	TEX; 25	NSV; 27	BRI; 7	TAL; 30	CAL; 40	NHA; 17	RCH; 27	NZH; 18	CLT; 42	DOV; 6	SBO; 14	GLN; 31	MLW; 29	MYB; DNQ	PPR; 17	GTY; 36	IRP; 28	MCH; 20	BRI; 37	DAR; 20	RCH; 5	DOV; 39	CLT; 39	CAR; 38	MEM; 8	PHO; 21	HOM; DNQ				17th	2607
2000	Kevin Grubb	37	Chevy	DAY; DNQ	CAR; 7	LVS; 12	ATL; 5	DAR; 12	BRI; 11	TEX; 14	NSV; 14	TAL; 15	CAL; 17	RCH; 37	NHA; 38	CLT; 28	DOV; 36	SBO; 37	MYB; 8	GLN; 24	MLW; 12	NZH; 9	PPR; 16	GTY; 31	IRP; 30	MCH; 34	BRI; 43	DAR; 25	RCH; 5	DOV; 7	CLT; 18	CAR; 41	MEM; 13	PHO; 17	HOM; 41				13th	3124
2001	Kevin Grubb	37	Chevy	DAY; 39	CAR; 12	LVS; 19	ATL; 25	DAR; 21	BRI; 35	TEX; 18	NSH; 34	TAL; 8	CAL; 26	RCH; 15	NHA; 20	NZH; 18	CLT; 33	DOV; 33	KEN; 8	MLW; 3	GLN; 13	CHI; 9	GTY; 3	PPR; 8	IRP; 22	MCH; 13	BRI; 13	DAR; 32	RCH; 3	DOV; 20	KAN; 22	CLT; 20	MEM; 28	PHO; 23	CAR; 15	HOM; 29			14th	3533
2002	Jeff Purvis	37	Chevy	DAY; 21	CAR; 18	LVS; 23	DAR; 30	BRI; 27	TEX; 1	NSH; 13	TAL; 15	CAL; 24	RCH; 11	NHA; 13	NZH; 28																								12th	3646
2002	Kevin Lepage	37	Chevy													CLT; 6	DOV; 18	NSH; 14	KEN; 12	MLW; 11	DAY; 3	CHI; 15	GTY; 9	PPR; 5*	IRP; 32	MCH; 36	BRI; 13	DAR; 13	RCH; 11	DOV; 24	KAN; 13	CLT; 19	MEM; 43	ATL; 40					12th	3646
2002	Elton Sawyer	37	Chevy																																CAR; 22	PHO; 20	HOM; 22		12th	3646
2003	David Green	37	Pontiac	DAY; 18	CAR; 2	LVS; 6	DAR; 31	BRI; 4	TEX; 29	TAL; 16	NSH; 1	CAL; 9	RCH; 9	GTY; 2	NZH; 4	CLT; 37	DOV; 3	NSH; 2	KEN; 8	MLW; 6	DAY; 20	CHI; 11	NHA; 1	PPR; 12	IRP; 6	MCH; 4	BRI; 17	DAR; 14	RCH; 5	DOV; 31	KAN; 1	CLT; 6	MEM; 19	ATL; 8	PHO; 16	CAR; 10	HOM; 9		2nd	4623
2004	David Green	37	Pontiac	DAY; 10	CAR; 5	LVS; 11	DAR; 3	BRI; 5	TEX; 8				GTY; 11	RCH; 6	NZH; 3	CLT; 23		NSH; 34		MLW; 8			NHA; 21			MCH; 32		CAL; 15	RCH; 14				MEM; 24		PHO; 16				7th	4082
2004	David Green	37	Chevy							NSH; 10	TAL; 9	CAL; 25					DOV; 3		KEN; 13		DAY; 34	CHI; 8		PPR; 8	IRP; 10		BRI; 5			DOV; 10	KAN; 35	CLT; 13		ATL; 16		DAR; 29	HOM; 42		7th	4082
2005	David Green	27	Ford	DAY; 22	CAL; 14	MXC; 39	LVS; 10	ATL; 33	NSH; 18	BRI; 15	TEX; 11	PHO; 14	TAL; 13	DAR; 15	RCH; 14	CLT; 31	DOV; 11	NSH; 33	KEN; 12	MLW; 11	DAY; 12	CHI; 30	NHA; 20	PPR; 1	GTY; 4	IRP; 8	GLN; 22	MCH; 21	BRI; 27	CAL; 18	RCH; 18	DOV; 32	KAN; 15	CLT; 38	MEM; 4	TEX; 15	PHO; 12	HOM; 9	8th	3908
2006	David Green	27	Ford	DAY; 37	CAL; 20	MXC; 35	LVS; 29	ATL; 36	BRI; 25	TEX; 16	NSH; 29	PHO; 9	TAL; 24	RCH; 12	DAR; 24	CLT; 14	DOV; 17	NSH; 21	KEN; 21	MLW; 17	DAY; 23	CHI; 22	NHA; 22	MAR; 31	GTY; 7	IRP; 28	GLN; 15	MCH; 32	BRI; 21	CAL; 26									14th	3387
2006	Casey Atwood	27	Ford																												RCH; 23	DOV; 29	KAN; 17	CLT; 17	MEM; 17	TEX; 18	PHO; 23	HOM; 21	14th	3387
2007	Ward Burton	27	Ford	DAY; 32	CAL; 34		LVS; 15	ATL; 21	BRI; 27		TEX; 21	PHO; 20	TAL; 8	RCH; 25	DAR; 21	CLT; 19	DOV; 17				NHA; 16	DAY; 19	CHI; 22					MCH; 35											24th	2745
2007	Jorge Goeters	27	Ford			MXC; 7																				CGV; 31	GLN; 29												24th	2745
2007	Jason Keller	27	Ford							NSH; 33									KEN; 20	MLW; 5				GTY; 30	IRP; 11														24th	2745
2007	Bobby East	27	Ford															NSH; 24																					24th	2745
2007	Johnny Sauter	27	Ford																										BRI; 22	CAL	RCH	DOV	KAN	CLT	MEM	TEX	PHO	HOM	24th	2745

=== Car No. 27 History ===
Casey Atwood (1998-2000)

The No. 27 car debuted at Myrtle Beach Speedway in 1998, with Casey Atwood driving the car to a 28th-place finish. Scot Walters drove next, at California Speedway, finishing 43rd after handling problems plagued the car. The No. 27 went full-time in 1999, with Atwood driving, and Castrol as the new sponsor. Atwood won twice that year, at The Milwaukee Mile and Dover International Speedway, and finished 13th in points. He would not win in 2000, but he did finish eighth in points, and signed with Evernham Motorsports' Winston Cup program for 2001.

Jamie McMurray (2001-2002)

Atwood was replaced by rookie Jamie McMurray for the 2001 season, with Williams Travel Centers replacing Castrol as the sponsor (moving over from the team's part-time No. 39 car). After three top-ten finishes in 2001, McMurray won two times the next year and finished sixth in points, departing the team at the end of the season to drive for Chip Ganassi Racing in the Winston Cup Series.

Multiple drivers (2003)

In 2003, rookies Chase Montgomery and Joey Clanton shared the ride with Hank Parker Jr., with sponsorship coming from TrimSpa and Alice Cooper. Montgomery ran seven of the first nine races, with Parker Jr. running the other two. Clanton then ran the car for the next 18 races, before Montgomery returned for the rest of the season. The car had three top-ten finishes, one with each driver.

Johnny Sauter (2004)

In 2004, Johnny Sauter joined the team, with Kleenex coming aboard as sponsor. Sauter posted eight top-tens and had an 18th-place finish in points, but left for Phoenix Racing at the end of the season.

Duraflame #66 (2005-2006)

For 2005, while the 27 Kleenex team took the place of the former 37 car, the old 27 car switched to No. 66, with the number and Duraflame sponsorship moving from Rusty Wallace, Inc. to Brewco. Greg Biffle and Aaron Fike shared the driving duties that year, with Biffle winning once and garnering 16 top-ten finishes in 21 starts, while Fike had one top-ten in 11 starts. In 2006, Biffle shared the ride with Ken Schrader, Scott Wimmer, and Bobby Labonte.

Multiple drivers #37 (2007)

The team switched to the No. 37 for 2007 (the main number which had been used by Brewco from 1996-2004), while Rusty Wallace, Inc. regained its own original number, the No. 66. For the first half of the season, Greg Biffle and Jamie McMurray shared driving duties (except for one race where Johnny Sauter drove), with sponsorship from Cub Cadet and Yard-Man. Later, John Graham was named the driver for ten races (with Fun Energy Foods sponsoring), and Bobby East and Casey Atwood each drove a few races for the team (along with Biffle and McMurray). Between the fall races at Bristol and California Speedway, Brewer sold his team to Baker-Curb Racing, which took over the #37 at that point.

==== Car No. 27 results ====
Year	Driver	No.	Make	1	2	3	4	5	6	7	8	9	10	11	12	13	14	15	16	17	18	19	20	21	22	23	24	25	26	27	28	29	30	31	32	33	34	35	Owners	Pts
1998	Casey Atwood	27	Chevy	DAY	CAR	LVS	NSV	DAR	BRI	TEX	HCY	TAL	NHA	NZH	CLT	DOV	RCH	PPR	GLN	MLW	MYB; 28	CAL	SBO; DNQ	IRP	MCH; DNQ	BRI	DAR	RCH	DOV	CLT	GTY	CAR	ATL	HOM					54th	91
1999	Casey Atwood	27	Chevy	DAY; 17	CAR; 5	LVS; DNQ	ATL; 16	DAR; 28	TEX; 35	NSV; 2	BRI; 15	TAL; 8	CAL; 18	NHA; 5	RCH; 20	NZH; 33	CLT; 34	DOV; 36	SBO; 10	GLN; 41	MLW; 1*	MYB; 29	PPR; 8	GTY; 7	IRP; 32	MCH; 42	BRI; 15	DAR; 26	RCH; 31	DOV; 1	CLT; 23	CAR; 43	MEM; 30	PHO; 26	HOM; 34				13th	3134
2000	Casey Atwood	27	Chevy	DAY; 31	CAR; 32	LVS; 11	ATL; 26	DAR; 42	BRI; 21	TEX; 7	NSV; 24	TAL; 17	CAL; 22	RCH; 8	NHA; 7	CLT; 14	DOV; 11	SBO; 13	MYB; 11	GLN; 12	MLW; 43	NZH; 7	PPR; 6	GTY; 29	IRP; 31	MCH; 37	BRI; 9	DAR; 27	RCH; 34	DOV; 17	CLT; 22	CAR; 8	MEM; 6	PHO; 14	HOM; 20				8th	3404
2001	Jamie McMurray	27	Chevy	DAY; 11	CAR; 26	LVS; 20	ATL; 24	DAR; 14	BRI; 25	TEX; 16	NSH; 19	TAL; 29	CAL; 37	RCH; 26	NHA; 31	NZH; 10	CLT; 25	DOV; 19	KEN; 10	MLW; 19	GLN; 14	CHI; 20	GTY; 11	PPR; 12	IRP; 10	MCH; 17	BRI; 42	DAR; 23	RCH; 14	DOV; 17	KAN; 19	CLT; 31	MEM; 11	PHO; 33	CAR; 16	HOM; 42			16th	3308
2002	Jamie McMurray	27	Chevy	DAY; 11	CAR; 15	LVS; 29	DAR; 16	BRI; 26	TEX; 19	NSH; 7	TAL; 27	CAL; 11	RCH; 9	NHA; 9	NZH; 4	CLT; 16	DOV; 32	NSH; 26	KEN; 6	MLW; 16	DAY; 5	CHI; 12	GTY; 8	PPR; 8	IRP; 8	MCH; 12	BRI; 11	DAR; 32	RCH; 2	DOV; 26	KAN; 10	CLT; 41	MEM; 3	ATL; 1	CAR; 1	PHO; 38	HOM; 14		6th	4147
2003	Chase Montgomery	27	Pontiac	DAY; 10		LVS; 36		BRI; 22	TEX; 12	TAL; 13	NSH; 39	CAL; 25																			KAN; 27	CLT; 34	MEM; 26	ATL; 34	PHO; 30	CAR; 31	HOM; 33		17th	2934
2003	Hank Parker Jr.	27	Pontiac		CAR; 38		DAR; 6																																17th	2934
2003	Joey Clanton	27	Pontiac										RCH; 22	GTY; 15	NZH; 18	CLT; 26	DOV; 27	NSH; 27	KEN; 16	MLW; 20	DAY; 11	CHI; 14	NHA; 27	PPR; 5	IRP; 41	MCH; 24	BRI; 31	DAR; 22	RCH; 37	DOV; 27									17th	2934
2004	Johnny Sauter	27	Pontiac	DAY; 2	CAR; 6	LVS; 16	DAR; 27		TEX; 16	NSH; 2		CAL; 24	GTY; 18	RCH; 31	NZH; 22			NSH; 31			DAY; 29				IRP; 2								MEM; 8		PHO; 35				18th	3411
2004	Johnny Sauter	27	Chevy					BRI; 14			TAL; 31					CLT; 36	DOV; 10		KEN; 25	MLW; 31		CHI; 19	NHA; 27	PPR; 29		MCH; 15	BRI; 32	CAL; 17	RCH; 10	DOV; 5	KAN; 21	CLT; 41		ATL; 43		DAR; 21	HOM; 38		18th	3411
2005	Greg Biffle	66	Ford	DAY; 8	CAL; 40		LVS; 5	ATL; 6		BRI; 10	TEX; 2	PHO; 1*	TAL; 36	DAR; 4	RCH; 5	CLT; 4	DOV; 8		KEN; 30		DAY; 3	CHI; 2	NHA; 31				GLN; 12	MCH; 2	BRI; 2	CAL; 2	RCH; 10	DOV; 5	KAN; 2	CLT; 36		TEX; 2	PHO; 5	HOM; 2	7th	4165
2005	Jorge Goeters	66	Ford			MXC; 38																																	7th	4165
2005	Aaron Fike	66	Ford						NSH; 35									NSH; 38		MLW; 20				PPR; 8	GTY; 31	IRP; 19									MEM; 35				7th	4165
2006	Ken Schrader	66	Ford	DAY; 36			LVS; 17	ATL; 37	BRI; 37			PHO; 25	TAL; 22																BRI; 25			DOV; 15							18th	3202
2006	Scott Wimmer	66	Ford		CAL; 14					TEX; 9				RCH; 16	DAR; 26	CLT; 25	DOV; 15			MLW; 29	DAY; 33		NHA; 9		GTY; 6					CAL; 25	RCH; 8			CLT; 21		TEX; 11	PHO; 42	HOM; 15	18th	3202
2006	Jorge Goeters	66	Ford			MXC; 14																																	18th	3202
2006	Michael Waltrip	99	Ford								NSH; 10																												18th	3202
2006	Greg Biffle	66	Ford															NSH; 7	KEN; 17					MAR; 4			GLN; 4												18th	3202
2006	Bobby Labonte	66	Ford																			CHI; 12						MCH; 15											18th	3202
2006	Jason Keller	66	Ford																							IRP; 15									MEM; 12				18th	3202
2006	Brad Coleman	66	Ford																														KAN; 41						18th	3202
2007	Jamie McMurray	37	Ford	DAY; 42	CAL; 15		LVS; 29				TEX; 17		TAL; 36	RCH; 19		CLT; 18	DOV; 20					DAY; 18	CHI; 23																24th	2331
2007	Greg Biffle	37	Ford			MXC; 20		ATL; 40	BRI; 7			PHO; 6			DAR; 8			NSH; 28	KEN; 10		NHA; 7					CGV; 20	GLN; 11		BRI; 14	CAL	RCH	DOV	KAN	CLT	MEM	TEX	PHO	HOM	24th	2331
2007	Johnny Sauter	37	Ford							NSH; 35																													24th	2331
2007	Bobby East	37	Ford																	MLW; 22				GTY; 16	IRP; 39			MCH; 38											24th	2331

=== Car No. 99 History ===
In 1999, Brewco partnered with J&J Racing to run the No. 99 car for Kevin Lepage in 15 races, sponsored by Red Man. The No. 99 also attempted an additional 6 races with Matt Hutter driving.

=== Car No. 39 History ===
Brewco's third car made its debut as the No. 39 in 2000, with Andy Kirby driving and sponsorship from Williams Travel Centers. Kirby attempted to qualify for 11 races in the No. 39, but only made it into four of them.

In 2001, Brewco ran their third car in two races as the No. 47, with Sean Woodside and Clay Dale driving.

Brewco's third car returned for the Federated Auto Parts 300 in 2006, as the No. 37 (a number previously used by Brewco from 1996-2004), and was driven by Brad Coleman with sponsorship from race sponsor Federated Auto Parts.

== NASCAR Craftsman Truck Series ==
=== Truck No. 37 History ===
Brewco's NASCAR Craftsman Truck Series team made its debut in 1997, as the No. 37 Chevrolet C/K sponsored by Red Man Golden Blend. That year, the truck was driven by Scot Walters, David Green, and Mark Green, attempting a total of 9 races, with Walters and David Green each scoring one top-ten. In 1998, Walters drove the truck for the full season, finishing 19th in points with three top-tens.

==== Truck No. 37 Results ====
Year	Driver	No.	Make	1	2	3	4	5	6	7	8	9	10	11	12	13	14	15	16	17	18	19	20	21	22	23	24	25	26	27	Owners	Pts
1997	David Green	37	Chevy											NZH; 8										MAR; 13								
1997	Mark Green	37	Chevy												MLW; 12				IRP; 11													
1997	Scot Walters	37	Chevy	WDW	TUS	HOM	PHO	POR	EVG	I70; DNQ	NHA	TEX	BRI			LVL; 7	CNS	HPT		FLM	NSV; 26	GLN	RCH; 29		SON	MMR	CAL	PHO	LVS			
1998	Scot Walters	37	Chevy	WDW; 26	HOM; 10	PHO; 22	POR; 22	EVG; 25	I70; 15	GLN; 22	TEX; 36	BRI; 21	MLW; 20	NZH; 13	CAL; 21	PPR; 12	IRP; 21	NHA; 19	FLM; 22	NSV; 8	HPT; 13	LVL; 12	RCH; 20	MEM; 36	GTY; 9	MAR; 16	SON; 16	MMR; 15	PHO; 21	LVS; 23		

=== Truck No. 47 History ===
At the 1997 Hanes 250 at Richmond International Raceway, Brewco ran a second truck, the No. 47, for Jeff Green (the brother of the team's drivers Mark and David Green). The truck would finish 33rd after handling problems took them out on lap 47.

==== Truck No. 47 result ====
Year	Driver	No.	Make	1	2	3	4	5	6	7	8	9	10	11	12	13	14	15	16	17	18	19	20	21	22	23	24	25	26	Owner	Pts
1997	Jeff Green	47	Chevy	WDW	TUS	HOM	PHO	POR	EVG	I70	NHA	TEX	BRI	NZH	MLW	LVL	CNS	HPT	IRP	FLM	NSV	GLN	RCH; 33	MAR	SON	MMR	CAL	PHO	LVS		

== See also ==
- Curb Racing
- ThorSport Racing
