= Hank Parker Jr. =

American stock car racing driver and outdoorsman

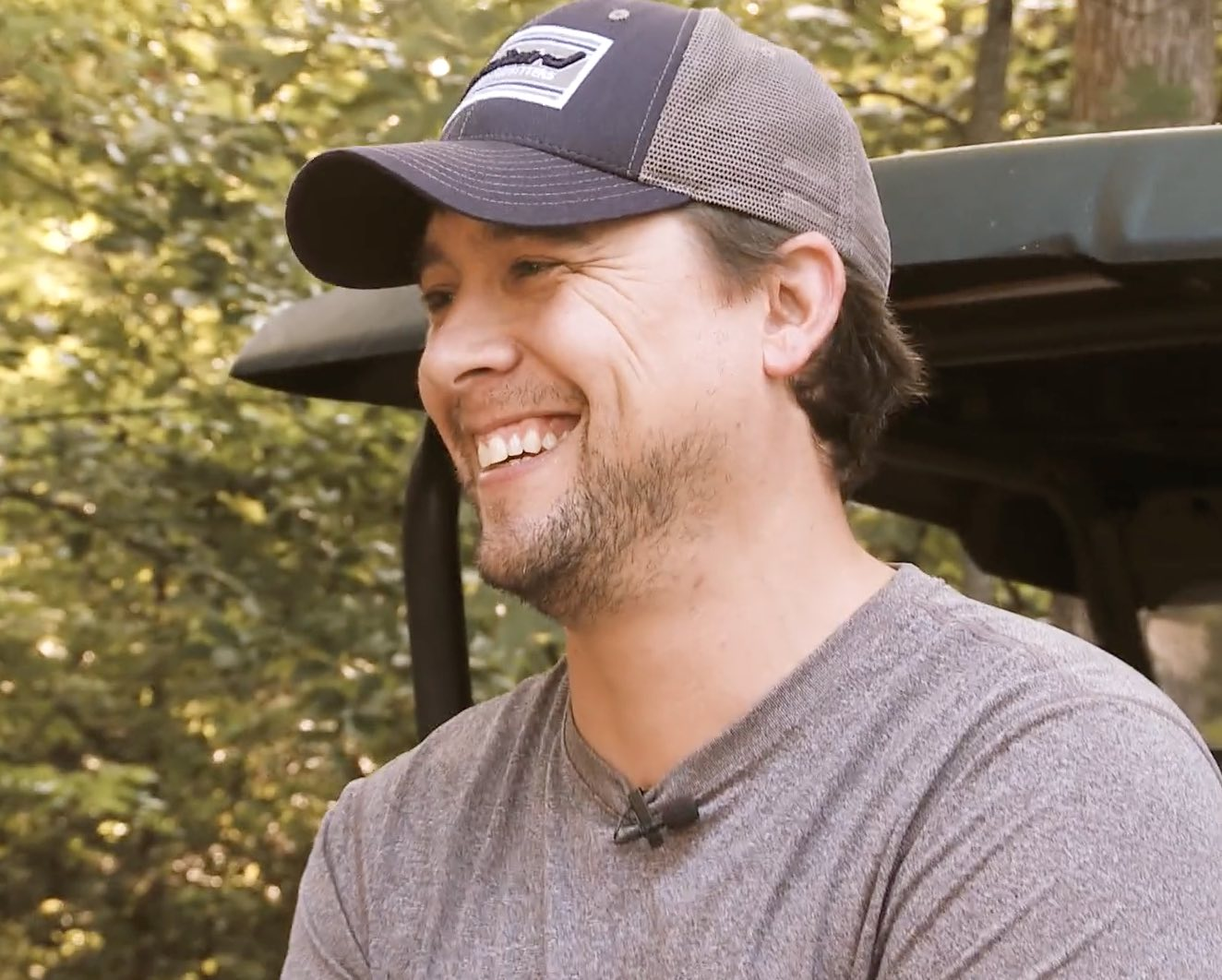
- Parker in 2018
- Born: October 7, 1974 (age 52); Denver, North Carolina, U.S.
- Height: 6 ft 1 in (1.85 m)
- Weight: 160 lb (73 kg)

NASCAR Cup Series career
- 1 race run over 1 year
- Best finish: 78th (2002)
- First race: 2002 Pop Secret Microwave Popcorn 400 (Rockingham)
- Last race: 2002 Pop Secret Microwave Popcorn 400 (Rockingham)
Wins	Top tens	Poles
0	0	0

NASCAR O'Reilly Auto Parts Series career
- 137 races run over 8 years
- Best finish: 14th (2000),(2002)
- First race: 1997 Jiffy Lube Miami 300 (Homestead)
- Last race: 2005 Federated Auto Parts 300 (Nashville)
- First win: 2001 Auto Club 300 (Fontana)
- Last win: 2002 NetZero 250 (Pikes Peak)
Wins	Top tens	Poles
2	31	2

NASCAR FedEx Freight Truck Series career
- 29 races run over 2 years
- Best finish: 17th (2004)
- First race: 2003 O'Reilly 200 (Memphis)
- Last race: 2004 Ford 200 (Homestead)
Wins	Top tens	Poles
0	6	0

Hank Parker Jr. (born October 7, 1974) is an American former stock car racing driver. He last competed part-time in the NASCAR Busch Series driving the No. 60 Ford Taurus For Roush Racing. His brother, Billy Parker, ran part-time in the Busch Series in 2004, and his father, Hank, is a professional outdoorsman.

== Early life ==
Parker was born on October 7, 1974 in Denver, North Carolina, to Martha Parker, and Hank Parker. He is the oldest of three, and is the big brother of Billy Parker, and Ben Parker. He began racing go-karts near his home in Denver, North Carolina as a kid. From there, he moved onto street stock racing at Concord Motorsports Park, where he won seven feature racing events in his first eighteen starts. The next season, he began running Late Model races and finished fifth in points. He won two races the next year.

== Career ==
In 1996, Parker moved to the Slim Jim All Pro Series, a former NASCAR touring series located in the Southeast United States. Parker picked up one win, and finish 13th in points. He would have a breakout season the following year, winning two races, and finished fourh in points, and was named the series' Most Popular Driver. He also made his NASCAR debut at the Jiffy Lube Miami 300 at Homestead in the No. 78 Mark III Financial Chevrolet, starting 41st and finishing 23rd.

Parker returned to the No. 78 in 1998, hoping to run the full schedule. After he was unable to qualify for most of his attempts, he was released. He did not run again until the AC Delco 200, where he finished sixth in the No. 53 B.A.S.S Chevrolet owned by his father.

Parker ran his father's car full-time in 1999, posting two top-fives and finishing 18th in points. He also finished second to Tony Raines for Rookie of the Year honors despite missing five races. In 2000, Parker received sponsorship from Team Marines and won his first career pole position at Las Vegas Motor Speedway. He also had eight top-tens and finished a career-best fourteenth in points.

In 2001, Parker switched to the No. 36 GNC Live Well Chevy for Cicci-Welliver Racing. He finished 15th in points, and collected his first win at the Auto Club 300. At the end of the season, his team was sold to Wayne Jesel and switched to Dodge for the 2002 season. He won another race at Pikes Peak International Raceway and had eight top-tens. He also made his Winston Cup debut, driving the No. 91 USG Dodge for Evernham Motorsports at North Carolina Speedway. He started 25th and finished 33rd, four laps down.

At the end of the 2002 season, Parker was to take GNC over to ppc Racing but due to a new law that restricts advertising with supplements, this caused GNC to leave NASCAR and therefore, leaving him without a full-time ride into 2003. He began the season running a pair of races for Brewco Motorsports, finishing sixth at Darlington Raceway. He ran four more races that season splitting time between NEMCO Motorsports and Chance 2 Motorsports, finishing fifth twice. He also made his Craftsman Truck Series debut driving the No. 75 for Spears Motorsports, posting two top-ten finishes.

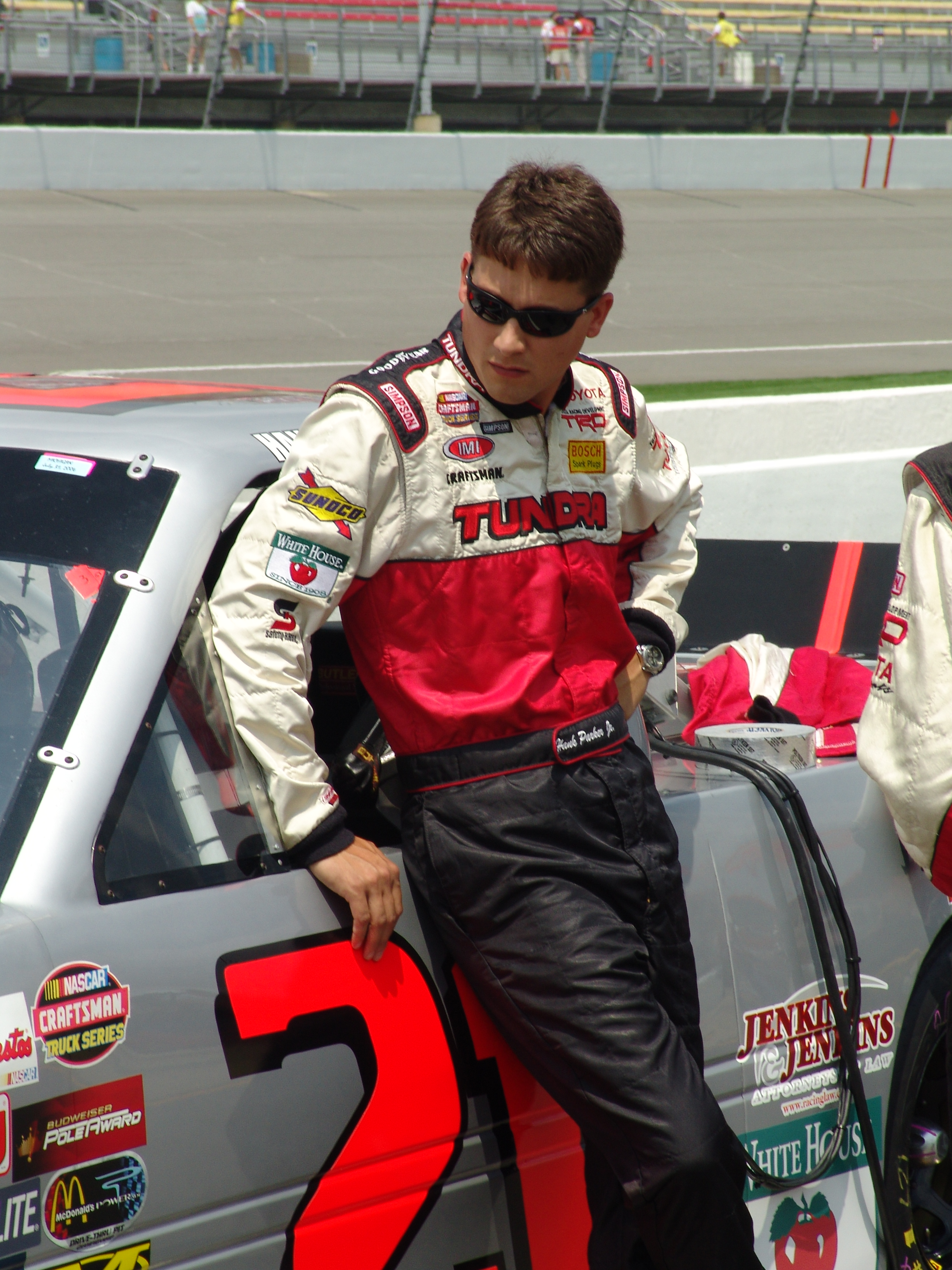
Parker standing in front of his truck ahead of the 2004 Truck race at Michigan International Speedway

In 2004, Parker signed to drive for Innovative Motorsports' new Craftsman Truck team. He had four top-tens and finished seventeenth in points. Unfortunately, Innovative closed its doors at the end of the season, leaving Parker unemployed again, he would join Roush Racing to mentor rising star Carl Edwards from 2005 to 2006, he would also qualify Edwards car when he was at the Nextel Cup tracks for qualifying. He made his last start in 2005 filling for Carl Edwards at Nashville as Carl convinced team owner Jack Roush to let Hank give it a shot. He won his second and final Busch Series pole, but finished twentieth.

Parker then decided to retire from racing to focus on family. He would later join his father and brother Billy to produce Hank Parker 3D, an outdoors-themed television show, then Hank Parker's Flesh and Blood, a hunting show.

== Personal life ==
Parker is a devout Christian. He is also friends with Dale Earnhardt Jr. as they met when they were kids on a fishing trip as his father Hank Parker was friends with the late Dale Earnhardt. Parker currently works at Snowbird Wilderness Outfitters, a Christian camp in Andrews North Carolina as a preacher time to time while also working as Executive Director of Sales, Marketing & Programming.

== Motorsports career results ==
=== NASCAR ===
(key) (Bold – Pole position awarded by qualifying time. Italics – Pole position earned by points standings or practice time. * – Most laps led.)

==== Winston Cup Series ====
NASCAR Winston Cup Series results
Year	Team	No.	Make	1	2	3	4	5	6	7	8	9	10	11	12	13	14	15	16	17	18	19	20	21	22	23	24	25	26	27	28	29	30	31	32	33	34	35	36	NWCC	Pts	Ref
2002	Evernham Motorsports	91	Dodge	DAY	CAR	LVS	ATL	DAR	BRI	TEX	MAR	TAL	CAL	RCH	CAL	DOV	POC	MCH	SON	DAY	CHI	NHA	POC	IND	GLN	MCH	BRI	DAR	RCH	NHA	DOV	KAN	TAL	CLT	MAR	ATL	CAR; 33	PHO	HOM	78th	64	

==== Busch Series ====
NASCAR Busch Series results
Year	Team	No.	Make	1	2	3	4	5	6	7	8	9	10	11	12	13	14	15	16	17	18	19	20	21	22	23	24	25	26	27	28	29	30	31	32	33	34	35	NBSC	Pts	Ref
1997	Mark III Motorsports	78	Chevy	DAY	CAR	RCH	ATL	LVS	DAR	HCY	TEX	BRI	NSV	TAL	NHA	NZH	CLT	DOV	SBO	GLN	MLW	MYB	GTY	IRP	MCH	BRI	DAR	RCH	DOV	CLT	CAL	CAR	HOM; 23						94th	94	
1998	Mark III Motorsports	78	Chevy	DAY; DNQ	CAR; 38	LVS; DNQ	NSV; DNQ	DAR; 28	BRI; DNQ	TEX; DNQ	HCY; DNQ	TAL	NHA	NZH	CLT	DOV	RCH	PPR	GLN	MLW	MYB	CAL	SBO	IRP	MCH	BRI	DAR	RCH	DOV										66th	283	
1998	Hank Parker Racing	53	Chevy																											CLT; DNQ	GTY	CAR; 6	ATL	HOM; DNQ					66th	283	
1999	Hank Parker Racing	53	Chevy	DAY; DNQ	CAR; 26	LVS; 21	ATL; 39	DAR; 31	TEX; 20	NSV; 36	BRI; 38	TAL; 19	CAL; 33	NHA; 29	RCH; 38	NZH; 10	CLT; 22	DOV; DNQ	SBO; 3	GLN; 10	MLW; 25	MYB; 11	PPR; 18	GTY; 24	IRP; 18	MCH; DNQ	BRI; DNQ	DAR; 30	RCH; DNQ	DOV; 20	CLT; 22	CAR; 29	MEM; 35	PHO; 12	HOM; 4				18th	2259	
2000	Hank Parker Racing	53	Chevy	DAY; 10	CAR; 25	**LVS**; 31	ATL; 17	DAR; 6	BRI; 8	TEX; 35	NSV; 16	TAL; 41	CAL; 8	RCH; 33	NHA; 5	CLT; 42	DOV; 41	SBO; 19	MYB; 22	GLN; 39	MLW; 7	NZH; 21	PPR; 4	GTY; 12	IRP; 35	MCH; 25	BRI; 16	DAR; 19	RCH; 40	DOV; 12	CLT; 21	CAR; 43	MEM; 34	PHO; 22	HOM; 7				14th	3109	
2001	Cicci-Welliver Racing	36	Chevy	DAY; 14	CAR; 17	LVS; 22	ATL; 38	DAR; 25	BRI; 21	TEX; 29	NSH; 25	TAL; 41	CAL; 1	RCH; 11	NHA; 18	NZH; 39	CLT; 15	DOV; 30	KEN; 11	MLW; 14	GLN; 32	CHI; 35	GTY; 26	PPR; 22	IRP; 25	MCH; 28	BRI; 34	DAR; 17	RCH; 28	DOV; 8	KAN; 2	CLT; 7	MEM; 32	PHO; 8	CAR; 8	HOM; 20			15th	3341	
2002	Team Jesel	36	Dodge	DAY; 35	CAR; 20	LVS; 26	DAR; 13	BRI; 33	TEX; 14	NSH; 34	TAL; 10	CAL; 13	RCH; 6	NHA; 8	NZH; 24	CLT; 15	DOV; 24	NSH; 8	KEN; 41	MLW; 20	DAY; 18	CHI; 40	GTY; 16	PPR; 1	IRP; 38	MCH; 13	BRI; 15	DAR; 15	RCH; 7	DOV; 38	KAN; 18	CLT; 40	MEM; 4	ATL; 43	CAR; 11	PHO; 27	HOM; 2		14th	3540	
2003	Brewco Motorsports	27	Pontiac	DAY	CAR; 38	LVS	DAR; 6	BRI	TEX	TAL	NSH	CAL	RCH	GTY	NZH																								51st	783	
2003	Chance 2 Motorsports	8	Chevy													CLT; 7	DOV	NSH	KEN	MLW	DAY	CHI	NHA								KAN; 5	CLT	MEM	ATL; 5	PHO	CAR	HOM		51st	783	
2003	Evans Motorsports	7	Chevy																					PPR; 15	IRP	MCH	BRI	DAR	RCH	DOV									51st	783	
2005	Roush Racing	60	Ford	DAY	CAL	MXC	LVS	ATL	NSH	BRI	TEX	PHO	TAL	DAR	RCH	CLT	DOV	NSH; 20	KEN	MLW	DAY	CHI	NHA	PPR; QL^{†}	GTY	IRP	GLN	MCH	BRI	CAL	RCH	DOV	KAN	CLT	MEM; QL^{†}	TEX	PHO	HOM	109th	103	
2006	Roush Racing	60	Ford	DAY	CAL	MXC	LVS	ATL	BRI	TEX	NSH	PHO	TAL	RCH	DAR	CLT	DOV	NSH	KEN	MLW; QL^{†}	DAY	CHI	NHA	MAR	GTY	IRP	GLN	MCH	BRI	CAL	RCH	DOV	KAN	CLT	MEM	TEX	PHO	HOM	172th	0	
^{†} – Qualified for Carl Edwards

==== Craftsman Truck Series ====
NASCAR Craftsman Truck Series results
Year	Team	No.	Make	1	2	3	4	5	6	7	8	9	10	11	12	13	14	15	16	17	18	19	20	21	22	23	24	25	NCTC	Pts	Ref
2003	Spears Motorsports	75	Chevy	DAY	DAR	MMR	MAR	CLT	DOV	TEX	MEM; 15	MLW; 8	KAN; 11	KEN; 10	GTW	MCH	IRP	NSH	BRI	RCH	NHA	CAL	LVS	SBO	TEX	MAR	PHO	HOM	44th	524	
2004	Innovative Motorsports	21	Toyota	DAY; 18	ATL; 33	MAR; 12	MFD; 19	CLT; 22	DOV; 3	TEX; 23	MEM; 12	MLW; 17	KAN; 21	KEN; 22	GTW; 5	MCH; 29	IRP; 15	NSH; 15	BRI; 6	RCH; 20	NHA; 9	LVS; 21	CAL; 15	TEX; 13	MAR; 31	PHO; 23	DAR; 35	HOM; 17	17th	2737	

* Season still in progress
^{1} Ineligible for series points

==== Winston West Series ====
NASCAR Winston West Series results
Year	Team	No.	Make	1	2	3	4	5	6	7	8	9	10	11	12	13	14	NWWSC	Pts	Ref
1998	Spears Motorsports	7	Chevy	TUS	LVS	PHO	CAL	HPT	MMR	AMP	POR	CAL	PPR	EVG	SON	MMR	LVS; 6	63rd	150	
