= Hank Parker's Outdoor Magazine =

Outdoor fishing television series

- Genre: Outdoors
- Created by: Hank Parker; Michael Runnels
- Presented by: Hank Parker
- Narrated by: William A. Landers (1985-present)
- Theme music composer: Eddie Reasoner (1985-1986; seasons 1-2); William A. Landers (1987-present)
- Country of origin: United States

Production
- Running time: 30 minutes
- Production companies: Parker/Runnels Productions (1985-1998; seasons 1-14); Hank Parker Productions (1999-present; seasons 15-present)

Original release
- Network: Syndication (1985; season 1); TNN (1986-2003; seasons 2-17); Outdoor Life Network (2003-2004; season 19-20); The Outdoor Channel (2005-present; season 21-present); Pursuit Channel (2012-present; seasons 28-present); Destination America (2014-present; seasons 30-present)
- Release: January 18, 1985 – present

Hank Parker's Outdoor Magazine is an American half-hour outdoor fishing television series hosted by former professional tournament angler Hank Parker. The show made its debut in syndication on January 18, 1985. The show was created in 1984 by founding executive producers Hank Parker and Michael Runnels; For the first 14 seasons of the show's run (1985-1998), Parker/Runnels Productions produces the show.

In 1999, longtime executive producer Michael Runnels left the show, leaving Hank Parker as the sole executive producer; The company was renamed Hank Parker Productions. The show was broadcast in NTSC from 1985 to 2009 (seasons 1-24).

In 2009, to celebrate the show's 25th anniversary, Hank Parker's Outdoor Magazine began broadcasting in HDTV 1080i.

== Format ==
During each half-hour episode, Hank Parker takes viewers on a fishing journey to the great outdoors. He offers fishing tips and techniques, invites guests, and meets some of the world's famous animals to eat.

== Theme music ==
"Chunkin' and Windin'" was the original theme song for "Hank Parker's Outdoor Magazine" for the first two seasons, from 1985 to 1986. It was written and performed by Eddie Reasoner. The same tune was also used on "Jimmy Houston Outdoors," and William A. Landers provided additional music. In 1987, Season 3 of Hank Parker's Outdoor Magazine introduced William A. Landers as the sole music composer. To avoid music rights issues, Eddie Reasoner's "Chunkin' and Windin'" was removed. The theme song for "Hank Parker's Outdoor Magazine" was written by Hank Parker and performed by the group Landers. The song begins with Landers singing the "do do do do do do" part, accompanied by a harmonica and tapping drum. The song ends with Landers singing "The house needs painting, grass needs mowing, where's he at?; He's gone fishing". The closing version of "Gone Fishing" features the same tune as the original. However, it ends with Landers singing "Gone fishing."

== Segments ==
Hank Parker's Outdoor Magazine has a segment called "Kid's Korner" that showcases kids demonstrating their fishing tips and techniques. The segment is sponsored by Mercury Outboards and debuted in Season 10 (1994). Hank Parker's "Tip of the Week" gives viewers fishing tips and techniques. Viewers can learn from Hank's experience and knowledge. Hank Parker's "Tricks of the Trade" column provides fishing tips and tricks from the pros. In this column, Hank shares his favorite fishing tricks that he's learned over the years.

== Opening and closing sequence ==
The opening and closing sequence for the first 10 seasons (1985-1994) of "Hank Parker's Outdoor Magazine" shows Parker's daily morning routine. The sequence starts with a clock showing "5:30," then shows Parker turning on the light, his feet hitting the floor, and him leaving his house with his fishing rod. It then shows him getting into his vehicle, starting his motorboat, and an exterior shot of his house. The sequence then shows a shot of his answering machine and a silhouette of Parker fishing, which transforms into a title card. Finally, it opens to reveal a still drawing of Parker himself. Season 2 (1986) of Hank Parker's Outdoor Magazine opens with a headline that reads "PARKER'S CLASSIC VICTORY '79 B.A.S.S. Masters Classic". In later seasons, the banner reads "'89 CHAMPION". It then flips over to show the headline "1983 Special Issue B.A.S.S. Angler-of-the-Year "SUPER PRO" Hank Parker". Finally, it flips over to show the headline "PARKER COMPLETES GRAND SLAM Winner, SUPER B.A.S.S. IV April, 1985". All of these headlines are in the Korinna font, which is the same font used for the answers on Jeopardy! The closing credits show Parker returning home from his fishing trip, and end with the Parker/Runnels Productions logo and the title card next to it.

In 1995 starting with Season 11, the opening of "Hank Parker's Outdoor Magazine" was changed to video footage of different families fishing, as well as scenes of Parker himself. An image of Parker winning the 1989 Bassmaster Classic is also shown. At the end of the show, a silhouette of Parker fishing is shown, and the picture freezes as the show's logo appears onscreen. The closing version is the same as the opening.
