= Hank Parker =

American outdoorsman and TV personality

Hank Parker Sr. (born March 26, 1953) is an American professional bass fisherman. Parker is a native of Maiden, North Carolina.

== Fishing career ==
In 1979 and 1989, Parker won two Bassmaster Classic tournaments, the biggest event in bass fishing. He is one of only five anglers to win the event more than once. Additionally, he was the first angler to win the Grand Slam of competitive bass fishing which includes the Classic, B.A.S.S. Angler of the Year in 1983, and B.A.S.S. SuperBass Tournament in April 1985. Hank finished in the money in 76% of B.A.S.S. tournaments he fished.

Parker teamed up with Michael Runnels to create Hank Parker's Outdoor Magazine in 1984, and debuted on January 12, 1985 on The Nashville Network cable channel. Notable show guests have included Larry Bird, Bo Jackson, Tony Dungy, numerous members of the U.S. Armed Forces and many more. The program now airs on Outdoor Channel and Pursuit Channel; it has previously aired on Versus (formerly OLN/Outdoor Life Network), ESPN and TNN, The Nashville Network (now Spike TV). In 1983, Parker was named B.A.S.S. Angler of the Year.

Parker also lent his name and likeness to a fishing video game titled Bassin's Black Bass with Hank Parker, released in 1994 for the Super NES, in which the player must earn their way onto the pro bass fishing tour, where they ultimately compete against Parker.

== Other honors ==
Over the years, Parker has been honored by being inducted in the Bass Fishing Hall of Fame, the Legends of the Outdoors Hall of Fame and the International Game Fish Association Hall of Fame.

After 30 years of television, Parker still has partnerships with many of the companies he started with including Ranger Boats, Mercury Marine and more.

== Personal life ==
Parker lives in Union County, South Carolina, with his wife, Martha. He has four sons: Hank Parker Jr. and Billy Parker, who have both driven in the NASCAR Busch Series, Ben Parker, who is fishing the 2015 Rayovac Fishing League Worldwide (FLW) Series, Timothy Parker, who is a fighter on the MMA circuit, and a daughter named Lucy Parker who is a professional photographer. Additionally, Hank and Martha have 13 grandchildren.

== Motorsports career results ==
=== NASCAR ===
(key) (Bold – Pole position awarded by qualifying time. Italics – Pole position earned by points standings or practice time. * – Most laps led.)

==== Busch Grand National Series ====
NASCAR Busch Grand National Series results
Year	Team	No.	Make	1	2	3	4	5	6	7	8	9	10	11	12	13	14	15	16	17	18	19	20	21	22	23	24	25	26	27	28	NBGNC	Pts	Ref
1994	Hank Parker Racing	03	Chevy	DAY	CAR; DNQ	RCH	ATL	MAR; DNQ	DAR	HCY; Wth	BRI	ROU	NHA	NZH	CLT	DOV	MYB	GLN	MLW	SBO	TAL	HCY	IRP	MCH	BRI	DAR	RCH	DOV	CLT	MAR	CAR	N/A	-	

== See also ==
- List of American fishers
