= Firelog =

Manufactured log used as wood fuel

A firelog is a manufactured log constructed to be used as wood fuel. Firelogs are designed to be inexpensive, whilst being easier to ignite, burn longer, and burn more efficiently than firewood. Firelogs are traditionally manufactured using two methods; the first method involves compressing sawdust into logs, while the second combines sawdust with paraffin or other binding agents, which is mixed and extruded into a log shape. The extruded firelogs are individually wrapped in paper packaging which can be ignited to start burning the firelog as the paraffin is readily combustible.

== Types ==
A new cleaner firelog has now been developed using waste fibre from the oil palm fruit bunches of Southeast Asia. Unlike sawdust logs, these burn with zero sulfur emissions. Also unlike sawdust logs, no trees need to be felled to produce these firelogs. Other new types of firelogs include one made from waste wax-cardboard such as that used in the packing of perishable foods for shipment, which is used to create a compressed cardboard firelog, and another made from renewable Greek cotton plants, offering a high energy content.

The materials used for a traditional firelog are variable, the sawdust used is often commercial wood waste from manufacturers, or waste agricultural biomass (nut shells, fruit pits, etc.); additionally bio-wax may be used in lieu of paraffin (petroleum-based wax).

There are wood and wax firelogs made using renewable materials. These are made using plant or animal based renewable waxes such as palm oil. These logs can be considered to be carbon neutral firelogs, as during combustion the carbon released is the same carbon absorbed when the plants are growing. Sulphur emissions are virtually eliminated with renewable firelogs as they do not contain paraffin waxes.

== Energy content ==
Energy content comparison
Extruded firelog	1,500 BTU/lb	3.4 MJ/kg
Firewood	6,190 BTU/lb	14.4 MJ/kg
Wood pellets	8,400 BTU/lb	19.54 MJ/kg
Compressed firelog	8,500 BTU/lb	19.8 MJ/kg
Palm fibre firelog	10,500 BTU/lb	24.4 MJ/kg
Java-Log	12,620 BTU/lb	29.3 MJ/kg
Northland	13,540 BTU/lb	31.4 MJ/kg
Duraflame Xtra Time	13,770 BTU/lb	32.0 MJ/kg
Duraflame Easy Time	14,420 BTU/lb	33.5 MJ/kg
Pine Mountain Superlog	15,190 BTU/lb	35.2 MJ/kg
Cotton plant firelog	17,000 BTU/lb	39.8 MJ/kg
Fossil fuel oil or Diesel	18,600 BTU/lb	43.26 MJ/kg

== See also ==
- Firewood
- Wood fuel
- Wood briquette
- Wood pellet
