= NASCAR O'Reilly Auto Parts Series at Chicagoland Speedway =

NASCAR O'Reilly Auto Parts Series races at Chicagoland Speedway

Cuervo 300

NASCAR O'Reilly Auto Parts Series
- Venue: Chicagoland Speedway
- Location: Joliet, Illinois, United States

Circuit information
- Surface: Asphalt
- Length: 1.5 mi (2.4 km)
- Turns: 4

Stock car racing events in the NASCAR O'Reilly Auto Parts Series have been held at the Chicagoland Speedway.

== Current race ==
Cuervo 300

NASCAR O'Reilly Auto Parts Series
- Venue: Chicagoland Speedway
- Location: Joliet, Illinois, United States
- Corporate sponsor: Cuervo Tequila
- First race: 2001
- Distance: 300 miles (480 km)
- Laps: 200; Stages 1/2: 45 each Final stage: 110
- Previous names: Sam's Club Presents The Hills Bros. Coffee 300 (2001); Tropicana Twister 300 (2002–2004); USG Durock 300 (2005–2007); Dollar General 300 (2008–2013); Jimmy John's Freaky Fast 300 (2014); Furious 7 300 (2015); Drive for Safety 300 (2016); TheHouse.com 300 (2017); Overton's 300 (2018); Camping World 300 (2019)
- Most wins (driver): Kyle Busch (4)
- Most wins (team): Joe Gibbs Racing (7)
- Most wins (manufacturer): Chevrolet; Toyota (7)

Circuit information
- Surface: Asphalt
- Length: 1.5 mi (2.4 km)
- Turns: 4

The Cuervo 300 is a NASCAR O'Reilly Auto Parts Series stock car race held annually at Chicagoland Speedway in Joliet, Illinois.

=== History ===
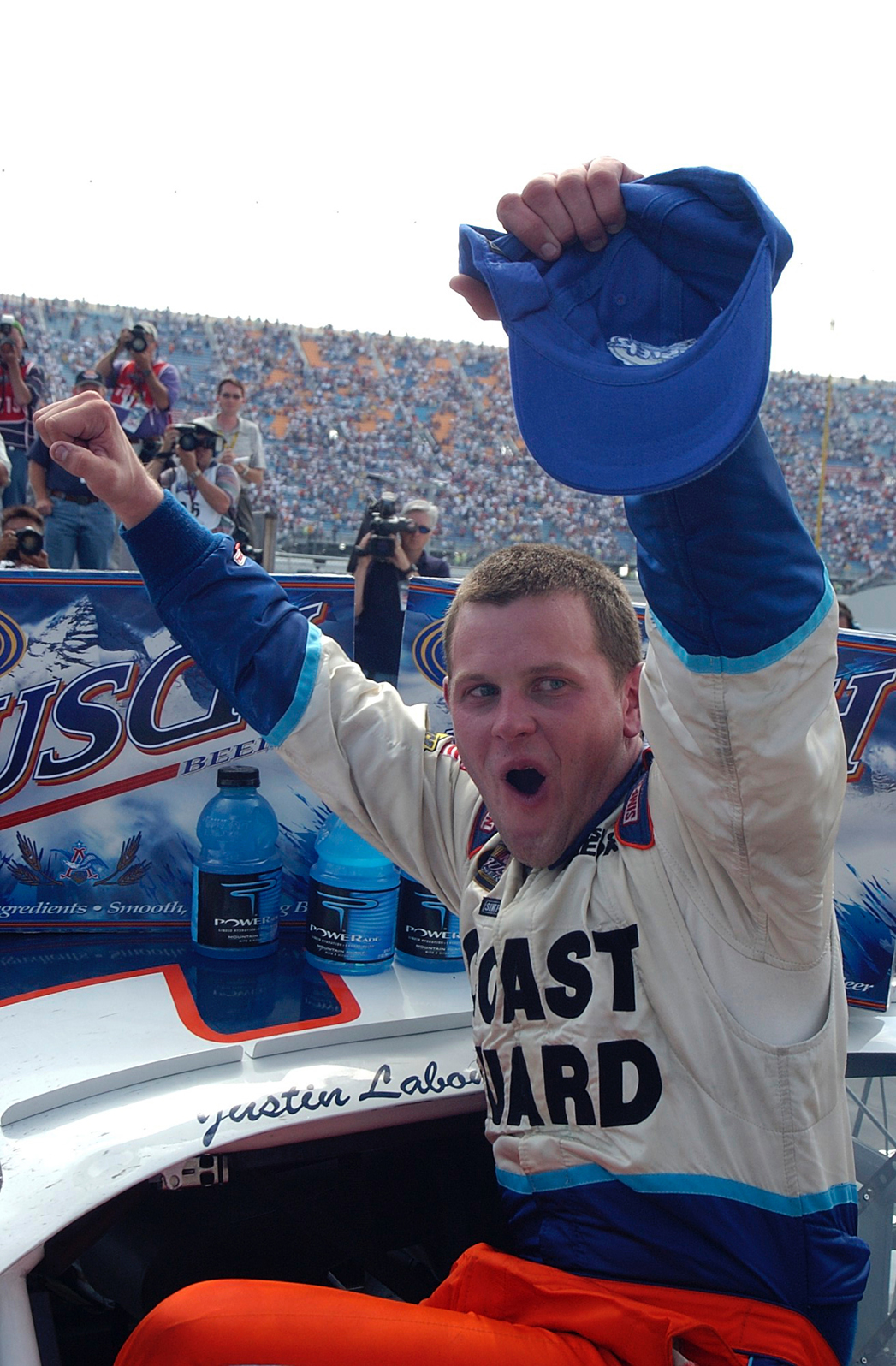
Justin Labonte celebrates after his only Busch Series victory during the 2004 event.

In 2008 the race has been held at night under Chicagoland's lighting system, after being held as a day race for the previous 7 years. However, in 2011, the race returned to daytime. From 2016 to 2017, it served as the final race of NASCAR's "regular season" for the Xfinity Series, Following the race, the top 12 drivers in points standings advance to the seven-race NASCAR Xfinity Series playoffs.

In 2017, the race was known as TheHouse.com 300. Starting in 2018, the race moved to June, the weekend before 4th of July. The new race that Las Vegas Motor Speedway acquired from Kentucky Speedway took Chicagoland's former spot and was renamed the Overton's 300.

In 2026, the race would return to the schedule.

=== Past winners ===
Year	Date	No.	Driver	Team	Manufacturer	Race Distance		Race Time	Average Speed (mph)	Report	Ref
Year	Date	No.	Driver	Team	Manufacturer	Laps	Miles (km)	Race Time	Average Speed (mph)	Report	Ref
2001	July 14	92	Jimmie Johnson	Herzog Motorsports	Chevrolet	200	300 (482.803)	2:30:40	119.469	Report	
2002	July 13	2	Johnny Sauter	Richard Childress Racing	Chevrolet	200	300 (482.803)	2:20:37	128.008	Report	
2003	July 12	25	Bobby Hamilton Jr.	Team Rensi Motorsports	Ford	200	300 (482.803)	2:18:45	129.73	Report	
2004	July 10	44	Justin Labonte	Labonte Motorsports	Dodge	200	300 (482.803)	2:21:58	126.79	Report	
2005	July 9	21	Kevin Harvick	Richard Childress Racing	Chevrolet	200	300 (482.803)	2:18:06	130.34	Report	
2006	July 8	42	Casey Mears	Chip Ganassi Racing	Dodge	200	300 (482.803)	2:23:31	125.421	Report	
2007	July 14	21	Kevin Harvick	Richard Childress Racing	Chevrolet	200	300 (482.803)	2:12:41	135.661	Report	
2008	July 11	18	Kyle Busch	Joe Gibbs Racing	Toyota	200	300 (482.803)	2:04:37	144.443	Report	
2009	July 10	20	Joey Logano	Joe Gibbs Racing	Toyota	200	300 (482.803)	2:02:10	147.34	Report	
2010	July 9	18	Kyle Busch	Joe Gibbs Racing	Toyota	203*	304.5 (490.045)	2:10:37	139.875	Report	
2011	Sept. 17	22	Brad Keselowski	Penske Racing	Dodge	200	300 (482.803)	2:01:06	148.637	Report	
2012	Sept. 15	6	Ricky Stenhouse Jr.	Roush Fenway Racing	Ford	200	300 (482.803)	2:10:05	138.373	Report	
2013	Sept. 14	54	Kyle Busch	Joe Gibbs Racing	Toyota	200	300 (482.803)	2:16:34	131.804	Report	
2014	Sept. 13	5	Kevin Harvick	JR Motorsports	Chevrolet	200	300 (482.803)	2:23:42	125.261	Report	
2015	Sept. 19	54	Kyle Busch	Joe Gibbs Racing	Toyota	200	300 (482.803)	2:11:40	136.709	Report	
2016	Sept. 17	20	Erik Jones	Joe Gibbs Racing	Toyota	200	300 (482.803)	2:29:17	120.576	Report	
2017	Sept. 16	7	Justin Allgaier	JR Motorsports	Chevrolet	200	300 (482.803)	2:15:07	133.218	Report	
2018	June 30	42	Kyle Larson	Chip Ganassi Racing	Chevrolet	200	300 (482.803)	2:13:34	134.764	Report	
2019	June 29	00	Cole Custer	Stewart–Haas Racing with Biagi-DenBeste	Ford	200	300 (482.803)	2:20:33	128.068	Report	
2020	June 20	Race canceled due to the COVID-19 pandemic.									
2021 – 2025	Not held										
2026	July 4	20	Brandon Jones	Joe Gibbs Racing	Toyota	201*	301.5 (485.217)	2:33:09	118.119	Report	
2027	June 26									Report	

- 2010 & 2026: Race extended due to an overtime finish.
- 2020: Race cancelled and moved to Darlington due to the COVID-19 pandemic.

==== Multiple winners (drivers) ====
# Wins	Driver	Years won
4	Kyle Busch	2008, 2010, 2013, 2015
3	Kevin Harvick	2005, 2007, 2014

==== Multiple winners (teams) ====
# Wins	Team	Years won
7	Joe Gibbs Racing	2008, 2009, 2010, 2013, 2015, 2016, 2026
3	Richard Childress Racing	2002, 2005, 2007
2	JR Motorsports	2014, 2017
2	Chip Ganassi Racing	2006, 2018

==== Manufacturer wins ====
# Wins	Make	Years won
7	(United States) Chevrolet	2001, 2002, 2005, 2007, 2014, 2017, 2018
7	(Japan) Toyota	2008, 2009, 2010, 2013, 2015, 2016, 2026
3	(United States) Dodge	2004, 2006, 2011
3	(United States) Ford	2003, 2012, 2019

== Former second race ==
Owens Corning AttiCat 300
NASCAR Xfinity Series
- Venue: Chicagoland Speedway
- Location: Joliet, Illinois, United States
- Corporate sponsor: Owens Corning
- First race: 2011
- Last race: 2015
- Distance: 300 miles (482.803 km)
- Laps: 200
- Previous names: STP 300 (2011–2013); EnjoyIllinois.com 300 (2014); Owens Corning AttiCat 300 (2015)
- Most wins (manufacturer): Chevrolet (3)

Circuit information
- Surface: Asphalt
- Length: 1.5 mi (2.4 km)
- Turns: 4

The Owens Corning AttiCat 300 was a NASCAR Xfinity Series standalone race held in the summer at Chicagoland Speedway in Joliet, Illinois. It replaced the race at Gateway International Raceway as a part of the 2011 changes to the series schedule. The race was replaced with a race at Pocono Raceway for the 2016 season.

=== Past winners ===
Year	Date	No.	Driver	Team	Manufacturer	Race Distance		Race Time	Average Speed (mph)	Report	Ref
Year	Date	No.	Driver	Team	Manufacturer	Laps	Miles (km)	Race Time	Average Speed (mph)	Report	Ref
2011	June 4	31	Justin Allgaier	Turner Motorsports	Chevrolet	200	300 (482.803)	2:06:56	141.807	Report	
2012	July 22	2	Elliott Sadler	Richard Childress Racing	Chevrolet	201*	301.5 (485.217)	2:18:10	130.929	Report	
2013	July 21	22	Joey Logano	Penske Racing	Ford	200	300 (482.803)	2:23:13	125.684	Report	
2014	July 19	9	Chase Elliott	JR Motorsports	Chevrolet	200	300 (482.803)	2:02:38	146.779	Report	
2015	June 21*	54	Erik Jones	Joe Gibbs Racing	Toyota	200	300 (482.803)	2:31:30	118.812	Report	

- 2012: Race extended due to a green–white–checkered finish.
- 2015: Race postponed from Saturday night to Sunday due to rain and thunderstorm.

==== Manufacturer wins ====
# Wins	Make	Years won
3	(United States) Chevrolet	2011, 2012, 2014
1	(United States) Ford	2013
1	(Japan) Toyota	2015

Previous race: MillerTech Battery 250	NASCAR O'Reilly Auto Parts Series; Cuervo 300	Next race: Hy-Vee PERKS 250
