= 2007 Sam's Town 250 =

Race details
- Map of Speedway
- Date: October 27, 2007
- Official name: 2007 Sam's Town 250
- Location: Memphis Motorsports Park in Millington, Tennessee
- Course: Short track
- Course length: 0.75 miles (1.20 km)
- Distance: 253 laps, 189.75 mi (305.373 km)
- Scheduled distance: 250 laps, 187.5 mi (301.8 km)
- Weather: Clear
- Average speed: 62.487 mph (100.563 km/h)
- Attendance: 36,500

Pole position
Driver	Marcos Ambrose	Wood Brothers Racing/JTG Racing
- Time: 22.901

Most laps led
Driver	David Reutimann	Michael Waltrip Racing
- Laps: 194

Winner
No. 99	David Reutimann	Michael Waltrip Racing

Television in the United States
- Network: ESPN2
- Announcers: Marty Reid, Rusty Wallace, Randy LaJoie

The 2007 Sam's Town 250 was a NASCAR Busch Series race held at Memphis Motorsports Park in Millington, Tennessee on October 27, 2007. The race was the 9th iteration of the event and the 32nd race of the 2007 NASCAR Busch Series. The race also marked the Busch Series debut of that years' IndyCar Series champion Dario Franchitti and for Rolex Sports Car Series driver Colin Braun, both of whom were making their second career start in NASCAR. Australian Marcos Ambrose won the pole for the race but it was David Reutimann who dominated the whole race leading the most laps and won the race giving him his first Busch Series win. But this race was most remembered for a major wreckfest as the race almost set a record for most cautions in a race as the race saw a total of 25 cautions for 117 laps with the longest green flag run only being 19 laps. The race was one caution short of the all-time NASCAR record set by another Busch Series race at Hickory Motor Speedway in 1992 that had 26 cautions. The race still remains as the second most caution period race in all of NASCAR history ahead of the 2005 Coca-Cola 600.

== Background ==
The Memphis International Raceway (more commonly known as MIR) was founded in 1986 by Ed Gatlin, who along with a group of investors, bought a 400-acre tract of land within the northeastern section of Shelby County, and built a drag strip with an adjacent road course, including a dirt track and a go-kart track. The facility opened in 1987 with a drag strip and 1.8-mile (2.9 km) road course. It includes a 3/4-mile tri-oval short track, built in 1998, which once hosted the NASCAR Xfinity Series and Camping World Truck Series, as well as an ASA Late Model Series race. The 4,400-foot (1,340 m) drag strip hosts events such as International Hot Rod Association (IHRA) World Finals and Nitro Jam, Professional Drag Racers Association (PDRA), HOT ROD Power Tour, Super Chevy Show, Fun Ford Series and Mega Mopar Action Series.

=== Entry list ===
- (R) denotes rookie driver
- (i) denotes driver is ineligible for points

#	Driver	Team	Make
0	Eric McClure	D.D.L. Motorsports	Chevrolet
01	Kertus Davis	D.D.L. Motorsports	Chevrolet
1	Sterling Marlin	Phoenix Racing	Ford
05	Brett Rowe	Day Enterprise Racing	Chevrolet
5	Landon Cassill	Hendrick Motorsports	Chevrolet
6	Auggie Vidovich	Roush Racing	Ford
7	Mike Wallace	Phoenix Racing	Chevrolet
9	Chase Miller	Gillett Evernham Motorsports	Dodge
10	Brent Sherman	Braun Racing	Toyota
11	Jason Keller	CJM Racing	Chevrolet
12	Marc Mitchell	CJM Racing	Chevrolet
14	Kyle Krisiloff (R)	Carl A. Haas Motorsports	Ford
16	Colin Braun	Roush Racing	Ford
18	Brad Coleman (R)	Joe Gibbs Racing	Chevrolet
20	Casey Atwood	Joe Gibbs Racing	Chevrolet
21	Tim McCreadie	Richard Childress Racing	Chevrolet
22	Mike Bliss	Fitz Racing	Dodge
25	Richard Johns	Team Rensi Motorsports	Ford
26	Kenny Wallace	Roush Racing	Ford
27	Brad Baker	Baker Curb Racing	Ford
28	Robert Richardson Jr.	Jay Robinson Racing	Chevrolet
29	Scott Wimmer	Richard Childress Racing	Chevrolet
30	Stanton Barrett	SKI Motorsports	Chevrolet
33	Cale Gale	Kevin Harvick Inc.	Chevrolet
35	Bobby Hamilton Jr.	Team Rensi Motorsports	Ford
36	Jeremy Clements	McGill Motorsports	Chevrolet
37	John Graham	Baker Curb Racing	Ford
38	Jason Leffler	Braun Racing	Toyota
40	Matt Carter	Specialty Racing	Ford
41	Bryan Clauson	Chip Ganassi Racing	Dodge
42	Dario Franchitti	Chip Ganassi Racing	Dodge
43	Bobby East (i)	Baker Curb Racing	Ford
44	Mike Harmon	Mike Harmon Racing	Chevrolet
47	Kelly Bires	Wood Brothers Racing/JTG Racing	Ford
49	Brian Keselowski	Whitney Motorsports	Dodge
52	Chris Lawson	Means Racing	Ford
54	Carl Long	Fridel-Carter Motorsports	Dodge
56	Danny O'Quinn Jr.	Mac Hill Motorsports	Chevrolet
59	Marcos Ambrose (R)	Wood Brothers Racing/JTG Racing	Ford
60	Matt McCall	Roush Racing	Ford
64	Chase Austin	Rusty Wallace Inc.	Dodge
66	Steve Wallace	Rusty Wallace Inc.	Dodge
71	Ron Young	RB1 Motorsports	Chevrolet
72	D. J. Kennington	MacDonald Motorsports	Dodge
77	Brandon Miller	Kevin Harvick Inc.	Chevrolet
88	Brad Keselowski (R)	JR Motorsports	Chevrolet
89	Morgan Shepherd	Faith Motorsports	Dodge
90	Stephen Leicht	Robert Yates Racing	Ford
99	David Reutimann	Michael Waltrip Racing	Toyota
Official Entry list

== Qualifying ==
Marcos Ambrose won the pole for the race with a time of 22.901 and a speed of 117.899.

Grid	No.	Driver	Team	Manufacturer	Time	Speed
1	59	Marcos Ambrose (R)	Wood Brothers/JTG Racing	Ford	22.901	117.899
2	99	David Reutimann	Michael Waltrip Racing	Toyota	22.933	117.734
3	42	Dario Franchitti	Chip Ganassi Racing	Dodge	23.013	117.325
4	38	Jason Leffler	Braun Racing	Toyota	23.063	117.071
5	11	Jason Keller	CJM Racing	Chevrolet	23.089	116.939
6	18	Brad Coleman (R)	Joe Gibbs Racing	Chevrolet	23.103	116.868
7	1	Sterling Marlin	Phoenix Racing	Chevrolet	23.118	116.792
8	43	Bobby East (i)	Baker Curb Racing	Ford	23.128	116.742
9	30	Stanton Barrett	SKI Motorsports	Chevrolet	23.143	116.666
10	20	J. J. Yeley** ***	Joe Gibbs Racing	Chevrolet	23.156	116.600
11	7	Mike Wallace	Phoenix Racing	Chevrolet	23.157	116.595
12	29	Scott Wimmer	Richard Childress Racing	Chevrolet	23.163	116.565
13	66	Steve Wallace	Rusty Wallace Inc.	Dodge	23.185	116.455
14	26	Jamie McMurray** ***	Roush Racing	Ford	23.188	116.440
15	16	Colin Braun	Roush Racing	Ford	23.219	116.284
16	22	Mike Bliss	Fitz Racing	Dodge	23.236	116.199
17	47	Kelly Bires	Wood Brothers/JTG Racing	Ford	23.285	115.954
18	90	Stephen Leicht	Robert Yates Racing	Ford	23.313	115.815
19	33	Cale Gale	Kevin Harvick Inc.	Chevrolet	23.319	115.785
20	5	Landon Cassill	Hendrick Motorsports	Chevrolet	23.329	115.736
21	72	D. J. Kennington	MacDonald Motorsports	Dodge	23.331	115.726
22	41	Bryan Clauson	Chip Ganassi Racing	Dodge	23.339	115.686
23	35	Bobby Hamilton Jr.	Team Rensi Motorsports	Ford	23.346	115.652
24	25	Richard Johns	Team Rensi Motorsports	Ford	23.346	115.652
25	88	Brad Keselowski (R)	JR Motorsports	Chevrolet	23.390	115.434
26	6	David Ragan (R)** ***	Roush Racing	Ford	23.399	115.390
27	71	Ron Young	RB1 Motorsports	Chevrolet	23.408	115.345
28	77	Brandon Miller	Kevin Harvick Inc.	Chevrolet	23.438	115.198
29	14	Kyle Krisiloff (R)	Carl A. Haas Motorsports	Ford	23.439	115.193
30	56	Danny O'Quinn Jr.	Mac Hill Motorsports	Chevrolet	23.451	115.134
31	40	Matt Carter	Specialty Racing	Ford	23.457	115.104
32	10	Brent Sherman	Braun Racing	Toyota	23.463	115.075
33	05	Brett Rowe	Day Enterprise Racing	Ford	23.482	114.982
34	0	Eric McClure	D.D.L. Motorsports	Chevrolet	23.509	114.850
35	27	Brad Baker	Baker Curb Racing	Ford	23.529	114.752
36	49	Brian Keselowski	Whitney Motorsports	Dodge	23.567	114.567
37	21	Tim McCreadie	Richard Childress Racing	Chevrolet	23.645	114.189
38	9	Chase Miller	Gillett Evernham Motorsports	Dodge	23.730	113.780
39	60	Carl Edwards** ***	Roush Racing	Ford	23.823	113.336
40	36	Jeremy Clements*	McGill Motorsports	Chevrolet	23.963	112.674
41	37	John Graham*	Baker Curb Racing	Ford	24.198	111.579
42	28	Robert Richardson Jr.*	Jay Robinson Racing	Chevrolet	24.544	110.007
43	64	Chase Austin	Rusty Wallace Inc.	Dodge	23.607	114.373
Failed to qualify, withdrew, or driver changes
44	01	Kertus Davis	D.D.L. Motorsports	Chevrolet	23.663	114.102
45	54	Carl Long	Fridel-Carter Motorsports	Dodge	23.686	113.991
46	89	Morgan Shepherd	Faith Motorsports	Dodge	23.737	113.746
47	12	Marc Mitchell	CJM Racing	Chevrolet	23.877	113.080
48	44	Mike Harmon	Mike Harmon Racing	Chevrolet	23.897	112.985
49	52	Chris Lawson	Means Racing	Ford	24.344	110.910
DC	6	Auggie Vidovich	Roush Racing	Ford	—	—
DC	20	Casey Atwood	Joe Gibbs Racing	Chevrolet	—	—
DC	26	Kenny Wallace	Roush Racing	Ford	—	—
DC	60	Matt McCall	Roush Racing	Ford	—	—
Official Starting grid

* – Made the field via owners points

** – There were 4 different driver changes by Raceday as there were drivers qualifying the cars for the Cup Series drivers. Auggie Vidovich qualified for David Ragan, Casey Atwood qualified for J. J. Yeley, Kenny Wallace qualified for Jamie McMurray, and Matt McCall qualified for Carl Edwards. This was during the peak of the Buschwhacker era where Cup Series drivers would drive in the Busch Series and would ask for other drivers to qualify their Busch Series car while they tried to qualify the Cup Series race which would be the Pep Boys Auto 500 at the Atlanta Motor Speedway.

*** – J. J. Yeley, Jamie McMurray, David Ragan, and Carl Edwards all had to start at the rear of the field due to driver changes.

== Race ==
Outside pole sitter David Reutimann took the lead from pole sitter Marcos Ambrose and Reutimann led the first lap of the race. The first caution flew on lap 8 when D. J. Kennington spun down the frontstretch and ended up getting stuck in the wet infield grass after it rained the previous night. The race would restart on lap 16. But on the restart, the second caution would fly when Kyle Krisiloff, Robert Richardson Jr., and Bobby Hamilton Jr. crashed in turn 2. The race would restart on lap 21 with Reutimann continuing to lead. On lap 39, the third caution would fly when Bryan Clauson spun off of turn 4 after he got squeezed in by Richard Johns and then got bumped and spun by Jamie McMurray. David Reutimann won the race off of pit road but Ron Young did not pit and he led the field to the restart on lap 45. On the restart, David Reutimann immeadietly took the lead from Young. But, the fourth caution would fly on the same lap. Kyle Krisiloff bumped and ran into Robert Richardson Jr. in turn 2 which pushed Richardson up the track. Richardson didn't like that and decided to retaliate on the backstretch by hooking a dead left into Krisiloff and turning him into the outside wall right in front of the pack of cars. The race would restart on lap 52. But on the restart, the 5th caution would fly when Ron Young spun in turns 3 and 4 after he got bumped by Brad Coleman. The race would restart on lap 56 and got some green flag racing in, but not for long. The 6th caution would fly on lap 60 when John Graham spun down the frontstretch. The race would restart on lap 65 with Reutimann still leading. On the restart, Bobby East spun in turn 2 after getting bumped by Landon Cassill but no caution was thrown since he got back going again. On lap 74, the 7th caution would fly when Matt Carter spun in turn 4 after contact with Richard Johns. The race would restart on lap 79. On lap 80, the 8th caution would fly when Chase Austin spun in turns 1 and 2. The race would restart on lap 85. But on lap 86, the 9th caution would fly when Chase Austin crashed in turn 3. The race would restart on lap 90. On lap 93, the 10th caution would fly when Ron Young spun off of turn 2 after he made contact with Kelly Bires where he spun down and got T-boned in the drivers side door by Chase Miller. The race would restart on lap 99. On lap 100, the 11th caution would fly when Jeremy Clements crashed in turn 2 after contact with Brandon Miller. Clements was unhappy with Miller and showed his displeasure with him under caution when he door slammed him. Miller followed Clements to pit road where Clements cut off Miller and the two moved on. The race would restart on lap 104. But on the restart, the 12th caution would fly when Steve Wallace crashed in turn 3 after he got bumped by Brad Keselowski. The race would restart on lap 109. But on the restart, the 13th caution would fly when Landon Cassill spun in turns 1 and 2 after he got bumped by Jamie McMurray. The race would restart on lap 114 and got some green flag laps in. But once again, not for long. On lap 118, the 14th caution would fly when Brad Baker spun in turn 4 after he got turned by Tim McCreadie and collected Brad Coleman in the process. The caution was also the new season high for the Busch Series after it passed the 13 cautions from the fall Dover race that happened 3 races ago.

=== Final laps ===
Sterling Marlin won the race off of pit road but 10 cars stayed out including Stephen Leicht and Leicht would lead the field to the restart on lap 125. On lap 129, the 15th caution would fly which would be the biggest crash on the day taking out 5 cars on the frontstretch. It started when Ron Young got turned by a car and spun down the infield grass. Sterling Marlin got bumped from behind and spun up to the outside wall and Brian Keselowski also got bumped and spun to the infield grass with Young. Carl Edwards attempted to navigate through the carnage but did not see Marlin stopped up high until the last second and ended up getting bumped from behind by Matt Carter in the process and ended up turning Edwards into Marlin and all three stopped up high. In comparison to the last two years of the race in 2005 and 2006, there were 15 cautions in both of those races. The 2005 race cautions happened in 254 laps while the 2006 race happened in 252 laps of the race, but this race had 15 in only 129 laps ran. The race was red flagged for a short bit for the wreck. The race would get back going again on lap 141. On lap 146, the track record for cautions was broken when the 16th flew when Kelly Bires spun in turn 2. Stephen Leicht pitted during the caution and handed the lead to rookie Marcos Ambrose and Ambrose led the field to the restart on lap 151. Eventually, the race would remain green for at least 10 laps for the first time since the race restarted on lap 65. On lap 161, an incident occurred when Richard Johns got sideways off of turn 4 and came down into Colin Braun and Brad Coleman. Coleman would cut a right front tire and hit the outside wall in turn 1. The 17th caution flew on the same lap. The caution was listed for debris which meant this would be the first and only non-incidental caution of the race. Marcos Ambrose pitted during the caution which would give the lead to Jason Keller and Keller led the field to the restart on lap 170. On lap 173, David Reutimann took the lead which would be only the 2nd and final lead change on track in the race. On lap 176, the 18th caution would fly when Mike Wallace spun off of turn 4 and had Brad Keselowski and Carl Edwards both spin to avoid Wallace. The race would restart on lap 182. On lap 183, the 19th caution would fly when Bobby East spun in turn 4 after getting bumped by Steve Wallace. The race would restart on lap 189. On lap 191, the 20th caution would fly when Brandon Miller got dumped by Dario Franchitti in turn 3 and crashed hard into the outside wall. The race would restart on lap 199. With 51 laps to go on lap 200, the 21st caution would fly when John Graham and Dario Franchitti spun in turn 3. The race would restart with 46 laps to go. With 43 to go, the 22nd caution would fly when Tim McCreadie spun in turns 3 and 4. The race would restart with 39 laps to go. The restart would be the first green flag run to go over 5 laps since the race restarted on lap 151. But with 31 laps to go, the 23rd caution would fly when Bobby East and Colin Braun crashed in turn 4. The caution would pass the Cup Series' all-time record in cautions. The race would restart with 27 laps to go. The race got a green flag run in of over 10 laps before the 24th caution flew with 17 to go when Steve Wallace crashed in turn 3 after getting spun by Brian Keselowski. Wallace was unhappy with Keselowski and Wallace caught up to Keselowski during the caution and bumped him in the rear a few times before cutting him off on the entrance of pit road. The race would restart with 13 laps to go. The restart had another green flag run of over 10 laps. It looked like the race was going to come to an end. But with just a lap and a half to go, the 25th and final caution would fly when Brent Sherman spun off of turn 4. This meant that the race would get extended to a green-white-checkered finish for the 4th Memphis race in a row. On the restart, David Reutimann would pull away from second place and Reutimann would win the caution-filled race. The race would be Reutimann's first and only Busch Series win of his career. Mike Bliss, David Ragan, Marcos Ambrose, and Jason Leffler rounded out the top 5 while Scott Wimmer, Jamie McMurray, Jason Keller, Brad Keselowski, and Brian Keselowski rounded out the top 10.

=== Aftermath ===
Overall, the race was 3 hours, 2 minutes, and 12 seconds. The race featured a total of 25 cautions for a total of 117 laps which was 45.5% of the race was run under caution which is nearly half the race. The average green flag run was only 5.3 laps with the longest green flag run being only 19 laps. The average speed of the race was only 62.487 mph compared to the 74.336 mph average from last years' race. The mark was one caution short of the all-time record that occurred in the 1992 Mountain Dew 500 at Hickory Motor Speedway when 26 cautions flew for 132 of the 300 laps ran in the race. NASCAR has not seen this many cautions since this race. The race still stands as the 2nd most cautioned period race in all of NASCAR history behind the 1992 Mountain Dew 500 and in front of the 2005 Coca-Cola 600.

== Race results ==
Pos	Car	Driver	Team	Manufacturer	Laps Run	Laps Led	Status	Points
1	99	David Reutimann	Michael Waltrip Racing	Toyota	253	194	running	195
2	22	Mike Bliss	Fitz Racing	Dodge	253	1	running	175
3	6	David Ragan (R)	Roush Racing	Ford	253	0	running	165
4	59	Marcos Ambrose (R)	Wood Brothers/JTG Racing	Ford	253	20	running	165
5	38	Jason Leffler	Braun Racing	Toyota	253	0	running	155
6	29	Scott Wimmer	Richard Childress Racing	Chevrolet	253	0	running	150
7	26	Jamie McMurray	Roush Racing	Ford	253	0	running	146
8	11	Jason Keller	CJM Racing	Chevrolet	253	7	running	147
9	88	Brad Keselowski (R)	JR Motorsports	Chevrolet	253	0	running	138
10	49	Brian Keselowski	Whitney Motorsports	Dodge	253	0	running	134
11	20	J. J. Yeley	Joe Gibbs Racing	Chevrolet	253	0	running	130
12	90	Stephen Leicht	Robert Yates Racing	Ford	253	27	running	132
13	7	Mike Wallace	Phoenix Racing	Chevrolet	253	0	running	124
14	47	Kelly Bires	Wood Brothers/JTG Racing	Ford	253	0	running	121
15	56	Danny O'Quinn Jr.	Mac Hill Motorsports	Chevrolet	253	0	running	118
16	21	Tim McCreadie	Richard Childress Racing	Chevrolet	253	0	running	115
17	71	Ron Young (Note: Young was docked 50 driver points for illegal shock absorbers)	RB1 Motorsports	Chevrolet	253	4	running	67
18	41	Bryan Clauson	Chip Ganassi Racing	Dodge	253	0	running	109
19	30	Stanton Barrett	SKI Motorsports	Chevrolet	253	0	running	106
20	5	Landon Cassill	Hendrick Motorsports	Chevrolet	253	0	running	103
21	10	Brent Sherman	Braun Racing	Toyota	253	0	running	100
22	05	Brett Rowe	Day Enterprise Racing	Ford	253	0	running	97
23	25	Richard Johns	Team Rensi Motorsports	Ford	253	0	running	94
24	9	Chase Miller	Gillett Evernham Motorsports	Dodge	253	0	running	91
25	60	Carl Edwards	Roush Racing	Ford	253	0	running	88
26	1	Sterling Marlin	Phoenix Racing	Chevrolet	253	0	running	85
27	37	John Graham	Baker Curb Racing	Ford	253	0	running	82
28	0	Eric McClure	D.D.L. Motorsports	Chevrolet	253	0	running	79
29	33	Cale Gale	Kevin Harvick Inc.	Chevrolet	252	0	running	76
30	16	Colin Braun	Roush Racing	Ford	252	0	running	73
31	28	Robert Richardson Jr.	Jay Robinson Racing	Chevrolet	251	0	running	70
32	42	Dario Franchitti	Chip Ganassi Racing	Dodge	250	0	running	67
33	18	Brad Coleman (R)	Joe Gibbs Racing	Chevrolet	240	0	running	64
34	27	Brad Baker	Baker Curb Racing	Ford	239	0	running	61
35	66	Steve Wallace	Rusty Wallace Inc.	Dodge	234	0	parked	58
36	43	Bobby East (i)	Baker Curb Racing	Ford	224	0	engine	0
37	77	Brandon Miller	Kevin Harvick Inc.	Chevrolet	190	0	crash	52
38	35	Bobby Hamilton Jr.	Team Rensi Motorsports	Ford	190	0	running	49
39	40	Matt Carter	Specialty Racing	Ford	129	0	crash	46
40	36	Jeremy Clements	McGill Motorsports	Chevrolet	100	0	crash	43
41	64	Chase Austin	Rusty Wallace Inc.	Dodge	86	0	crash	40
42	14	Kyle Krisiloff (R)	Carl A. Haas Motorsports	Ford	47	0	parked	37
43	72	D. J. Kennington	MacDonald Motorsports	Dodge	44	0	handling	34
Official Race results

== Notes ==
Previous race: 2007 Dollar General 300	NASCAR Busch Series; 2007 season	Next race: 2007 O'Reilly Challenge
