= Burney Lamar =

American racing driver (born 1980)

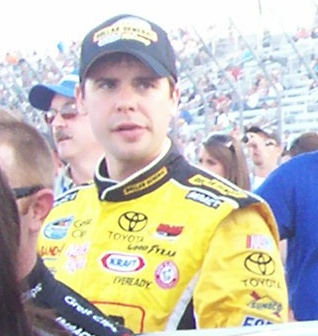
- Lamar in 2009
- Born: August 21, 1980 (age 46); West Sacramento, California, U.S.
- Achievements: 1999 Shell Tri-Track Challenge Champion; 2005 Copper World Classic Late Model Winner
- Awards: 2000 USAC Western Sprint Car Series Rookie of the Year; 2001 NASCAR AutoZone Elite Division, Southwest Series Rookie of the Year

NASCAR O'Reilly Auto Parts Series career
- 59 races run over 4 years
- Best finish: 22nd (2006)
- First race: 2005 United Way 300 (Kansas)
- Last race: 2009 NorthernTool.com 250 (Milwaukee)
Wins	Top tens	Poles
0	4	0

NASCAR FedEx Freight Truck Series career
- 2 races run over 1 year
- Best finish: 65th (2005)
- First race: 2005 Las Vegas 350 (Las Vegas)
- Last race: 2005 EasyCare Vehicle Service Contracts 200 (Atlanta)
Wins	Top tens	Poles
0	0	0
- Statistics up to date as of November 20, 2011.

Burney Lamar (born August 21, 1980) is an American former professional stock car racing driver. He has previously driven in both the NASCAR Xfinity Series and NASCAR Camping World Truck Series.

== Racing career ==
Lamar began racing go-karts at the age of five and won a total of 25 track championships and three International Karting Federation Regional titles. At the age of sixteen, Lamar started racing stock cars at Stockton 99 Speedway and finished eleventh in points. Over the next three years, he raced on many West Coast short tracks and won the Shell Oil Tri-Track championship.

In the year 2000, Lamar began racing in the USAC Western States Sprint Car Series. He posted seven top-fives and finished third in points, winning Rookie of the Year. The following year, he joined the NASCAR AutoZone Elite Division Southwest Series, and would win Rookie of the Year that year as well. He would go on to win two races and finish second in points in 2002.

Lamar signed with Kevin Harvick Incorporated in 2005, competing in a limited number of NASCAR Busch Series, Craftsman Truck Series and NASCAR West Series races. In addition to two victories in the West Series, Lamar also won the Copper World Classic at Phoenix International Raceway that season. In the Truck Series, he raced the No. 92 Chevrolet Silverado twice, with a best finish of 21st. He qualified eighth in his Busch Series debut in the No. 33 Chevrolet but wrecked early in that race and finished 41st. He would begin racing in the Busch Series full time in 2006 in the No. 77 Chevrolet and began the season with a second-place finish at Daytona International Speedway. After two additional top-tens in the first third of the season, Lamar's results began to fall off, and he was removed from the ride late in the season at the request of Dollar General, who wanted NEXTEL Cup drivers in the car.

Lamar attempted to make his Nextel Cup Series debut at the October race at Atlanta Motor Speedway and at the November race at Texas Motor Speedway in the Carter Simo Racing No. 08 Dodge but failed to qualify for both races. After failing to qualify for several attempts with E&M in the Cup Series, he returned to the Nationwide Series to drive the No. 37 Ford Fusion for Gary Baker. Later in the season, he signed to drive the No. 05 Ford for Day Enterprises.

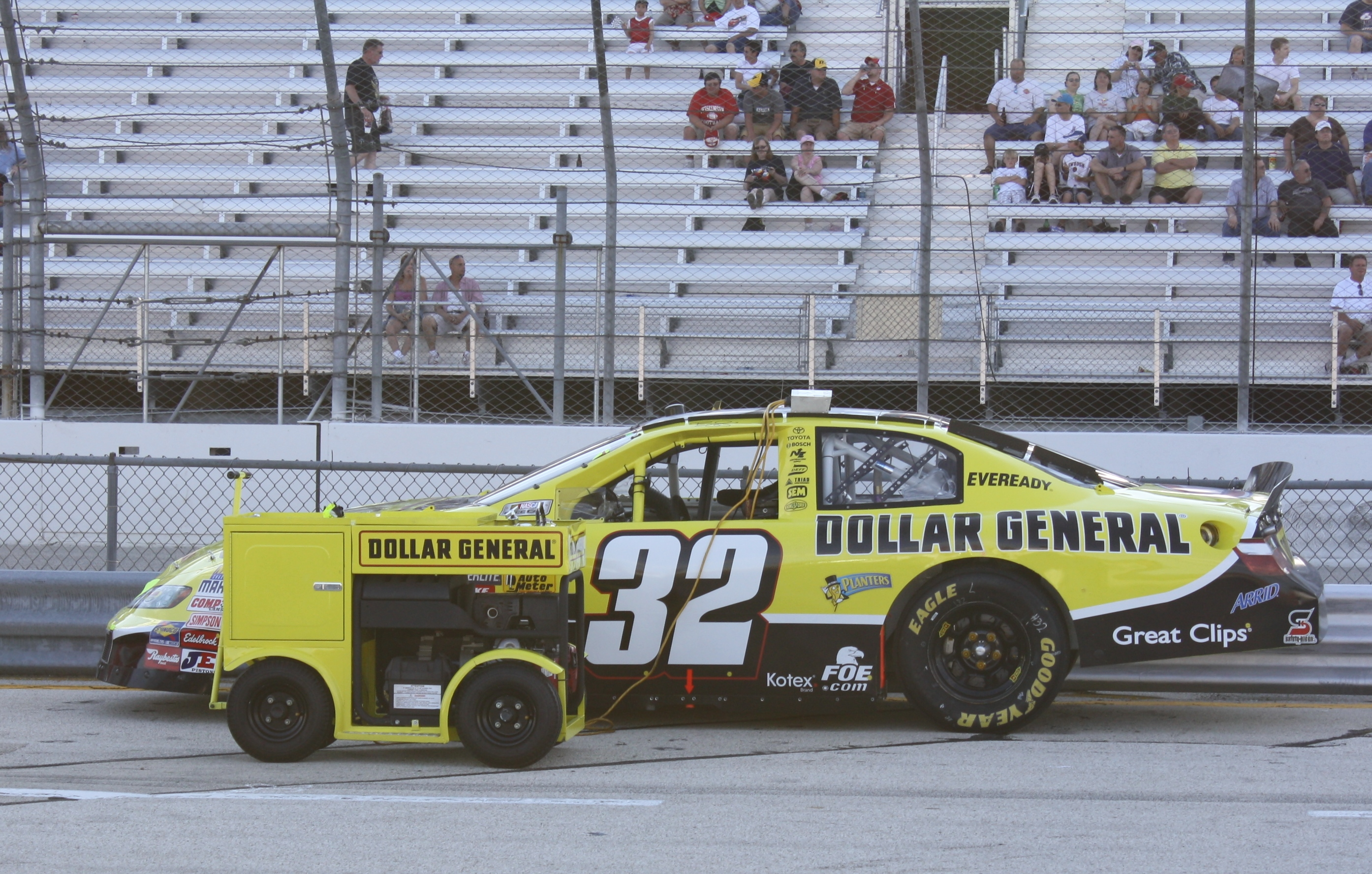
Lamar's No. 32 Nationwide car in 2009

On October 10, 2008, it was announced that Lamar would share the Braun Racing No. 32 Toyota in 2009 with Brian Vickers. He was again released after one top-ten in his first few races of 2009.

== Personal life ==
In the fall of 2006, Lamar was engaged to model Niki Taylor after just three dates. Taylor is five years older. They wed on December 27, 2006, at the Grande Colonial Hotel in La Jolla, California. Instead of gifts, the couple asked for donations to be sent to Victory Junction Gang Camp, a camp for terminally ill children in North Carolina.

Lamar's first child, daughter was born on March 4, 2009, one day before his wife's 34th birthday. On November 16, 2011, Taylor gave birth to her second child with Lamar, a son. He appeared in a March 2009 magazine advertisement for Skechers Footwear with his pregnant wife and her twin sons from her marriage to Miami Hooters linebacker Matt Martinez.

Until recently, Lamar worked as a flight instructor for Airline Transport Professionals in Nashville, Tennessee. He was hired by Mesa Airlines in November 2013 (Mesa contractually flies as US Airways Express as well as United Express). During his time at ATP he was known by the nickname "Blue Falcon".

== Motorsports career results ==
=== NASCAR ===
(key) (Bold – Pole position awarded by qualifying time. Italics – Pole position earned by points standings or practice time. * – Most laps led.)

==== Sprint Cup Series ====
NASCAR Sprint Cup Series results
Year	Team	No.	Make	1	2	3	4	5	6	7	8	9	10	11	12	13	14	15	16	17	18	19	20	21	22	23	24	25	26	27	28	29	30	31	32	33	34	35	36	NSCC	Pts	Ref
2007	E&M Motorsports	08	Dodge	DAY	CAL	LVS	ATL	BRI	MAR	TEX	PHO	TAL	RCH	DAR	CLT	DOV	POC	MCH	SON	NHA	DAY	CHI	IND	POC	GLN	MCH	BRI	CAL	RCH	NHA	DOV	KAN	TAL	CLT	MAR	ATL; DNQ	TEX; DNQ	PHO	HOM; DNQ	N/A	0	
2008	E&M Motorsports	08	Dodge	DAY	CAL; DNQ	LVS	ATL; DNQ	BRI	MAR	TEX; DNQ	PHO	TAL	RCH	DAR	CLT	DOV	POC	MCH	SON	NHA	DAY	CHI	IND	POC	GLN	MCH	BRI	CAL	RCH	NHA	DOV	KAN	TAL	CLT	MAR	ATL	TEX	PHO	HOM	N/A	0	

==== Nationwide Series ====
NASCAR Nationwide Series results
Year	Team	No.	Make	1	2	3	4	5	6	7	8	9	10	11	12	13	14	15	16	17	18	19	20	21	22	23	24	25	26	27	28	29	30	31	32	33	34	35	NNSC	Pts	Ref
2005	Kevin Harvick Incorporated	83	Chevy	DAY	CAL	MXC	LVS	ATL	NSH	BRI	TEX	PHO	TAL	DAR	RCH	CLT	DOV	NSH; DNQ	KEN	MLW	DAY	CHI	NHA	PPR	GTY	IRP	GLN	MCH	BRI	CAL	RCH	DOV							110th	101	
2005	Kevin Harvick Incorporated	33	Chevy																														KAN; 41	CLT	MEM	TEX	PHO	HOM; 34	110th	101	
2006	Kevin Harvick Incorporated	77	Chevy	DAY; 2	CAL; 21	MXC; 18	LVS; 26	ATL; 8	BRI; 20	TEX; 39	NSH; 7	PHO; 19	TAL; 20	RCH; 27	DAR; 21	CLT; 26	DOV; 32	NSH; 12	KEN; 19	MLW; 35	DAY; 22	CHI; 23	NHA	MAR; 23	GTY; 12	IRP; 16	GLN; 20	MCH; 38	BRI; 24	CAL; 14	RCH; 33	DOV; 39	KAN	CLT	MEM; 38	TEX	PHO	HOM	22nd	2710	
2008	Baker-Curb Racing	37	Ford	DAY	CAL	LVS	ATL	BRI	NSH	TEX; 40	PHO	MXC	TAL	RCH; 39	DAR; 34	CLT; DNQ	DOV; 42	NSH; 18	KEN; 32	MLW; 36	NHA; 36	DAY																	44th	1114	
2008	Day Enterprises	05	Ford																				CHI; 36	GTY	IRP	CGV; 35	GLN; DNQ	MCH; 38		CAL; 35	RCH; 39	DOV; 35	KAN; 32	CLT; 38	MEM; 38	TEX; DNQ	PHO; 37	HOM	44th	1114	
2008	Baker-Curb Racing	27	Ford																										BRI; 27										44th	1114	
2009	Braun Racing	32	Toyota	DAY	CAL	LVS	BRI; 15	TEX; 35	NSH; 13	PHO; 13	TAL	RCH; 28	DAR			NSH; 15	KEN; 8	MLW; 22	NHA	DAY	CHI	GTY	IRP	IOW	GLN	MCH	BRI	CGV	ATL	RCH	DOV	KAN	CAL	CLT	MEM	TEX	PHO	HOM	49th	957	
2009	Braun Racing	10	Toyota											CLT; 22	DOV																								49th	957	

==== Craftsman Truck Series ====
NASCAR Craftsman Truck Series results
Year	Team	No.	Make	1	2	3	4	5	6	7	8	9	10	11	12	13	14	15	16	17	18	19	20	21	22	23	24	25	NCTC	Pts	Ref
2005	Kevin Harvick Incorporated	92	Chevy	DAY	CAL	ATL	MAR	GTY	MFD	CLT	DOV	TEX	MCH	MLW	KAN	KEN	MEM	IRP	NSH	BRI	RCH	NHA	LVS; 21	MAR	ATL; 28	TEX	PHO	HOM	65th	179	

==== West Series ====
NASCAR West Series results
Year	Team	No.	Make	1	2	3	4	5	6	7	8	9	10	11	12	NWSC	Pts	Ref
2005	Kevin Harvick Incorporated	33	Chevy	PHO	MMR; 6*	PHO; 1*	S99	IRW	EVG	S99	PPR	CAL; 1	DCS	CTS	MMR; 10	18th	664	

=== ARCA Re/Max Series ===
(key) (Bold – Pole position awarded by qualifying time. Italics – Pole position earned by points standings or practice time. * – Most laps led.)

ARCA Re/Max Series results
Year	Team	No.	Make	1	2	3	4	5	6	7	8	9	10	11	12	13	14	15	16	17	18	19	20	21	22	23	ARMC	Pts	Ref
2005	Gosselin Racing	12	Chevy	DAY	NSH	SLM	KEN	TOL	LAN	MIL	POC	MCH	KAN	KEN	BLN	POC	GTW	LER	NSH	MCH	ISF	TOL	DSF	CHI	SLM	TAL; 6	105th	200	
2006	Richard Childress Racing	31	Chevy	DAY; 4	NSH	SLM	WIN	KEN	TOL	POC	MCH	KAN	KEN	BLN	POC	GTW; 28	NSH	MCH; 29	ISF	MIL	TOL	DSF	CHI	SLM	TAL	IOW	78th	395	
