= Curb Racing =

Former NASCAR team

Curb Agajanian Performance Group Baker Curb Racing
- Owner(s): Mike Curb; Cary Agajanian
- Series: Winston Cup Series, Nationwide Series, Craftsman Truck Series
- Opened: 1984
- Closed: 2011

Career
- Debut: Cup Series: 1984 Daytona 500 (Daytona); Nationwide Series: 1996 CARQUEST Auto Parts 250 (Gateway); Truck Series: 2004 Kroger 250 (Martinsville)
- Latest race: Cup Series: 1988 Goodwrench 500 (Rockingham); Nationwide Series: 2011 Royal Purple 300 (Fontana); Truck Series: 2004 Ford 200 (Homestead-Miami)
- Drivers' Championships: Total: 0 Cup Series: 0 Nationwide Series: 0 Truck Series: 0
- Race victories: Total: 3 Cup Series: 2 Nationwide Series: 1 Truck Series: 0
- Pole positions: Total: 1 Cup Series: 0 Nationwide Series: 1 Truck Series: 0

Curb Racing is a former NASCAR team competing mainly in the Sprint Cup Series and Xfinity Series from 1984 to 2011. The team was owned by Mike Curb, CEO of Curb Records and 45th Lieutenant Governor of California. Curb also had numerous business partners affiliated with his NASCAR operations, including Gary Baker, Cary Agajanian, John Andretti, and Donald Laird. The team fielded cars for several notable NASCAR drivers, including Richard Petty, Dale Jarrett, Jimmie Johnson, and Greg Biffle.

The team was active in the Cup Series from 1984 to 1988, in the Busch/Nationwide Series from 1996 to 2011, and fielded entries in the Truck Series in 2004.

== Cup Series ==
=== Car No. 42 history ===
In 1985, Curb fielded a second car at the Atlanta Motor Speedway. Tom Sneva drove an unsponsored No. 42 Pontiac, finishing 32nd after an engine failure. It was the only time Curb would field two cars in a Cup Series race.

=== Car No. 42 results ===
Year	Driver	No.	Make	1	2	3	4	5	6	7	8	9	10	11	12	13	14	15	16	17	18	19	20	21	22	23	24	25	26	27	28	Owners	Pts
1985	Tom Sneva	42	Pontiac	DAY; DNQ	RCH	CAR	ATL; 32	BRI	DAR	NWS	MAR	TAL	DOV	CLT	RSD	POC	MCH	DAY	POC	TAL	MCH	BRI	DAR	RCH	DOV	MAR	NWS	CLT	CAR	ATL	RSD	N/A	0

=== Car No. 43 history ===
The team was founded as Curb Racing in 1984, running Pontiacs in NASCAR's premier series, the Winston Cup Series. Seven-time Cup champion Richard Petty drove the car, with Petty bringing his STP sponsorship and the No. 43 with him from Petty Enterprises. Buddy Parrott was the crew chief. In his first season with Curb, Petty scored two wins, including the Firecracker 400 for his 200th and final career win. Petty finished tenth in the final championship standings.

Petty returned in 1985, with new crew chief Mike Beam. Petty posted 13 top-10 finishes, but had only one top-5 and posted 12 DNFs.

In 1986, Petty and STP left Curb to rejoin Petty Enterprises. Petty took the No. 43 with him, thus Curb switched to No. 98.

=== Car No. 43 results ===
Year	Driver	No.	Make	1	2	3	4	5	6	7	8	9	10	11	12	13	14	15	16	17	18	19	20	21	22	23	24	25	26	27	28	29	30	Owners	Pts
1984	Richard Petty	43	Pontiac	DAY; 31	RCH; 15	CAR; 4	ATL; 4	BRI; 8	NWS; 12	DAR; 7	MAR; 12	TAL; 6	NSV; 7	DOV; 1	CLT; 34	RSD; 23	POC; 13	MCH; 34	DAY; 1	NSV; 25	POC; 27	TAL; 23	MCH; 9	BRI; 17	DAR; 29	RCH; 5	DOV; 37	MAR; 8	CLT; 9	NWS; 18	CAR; 15	ATL; 8	RSD; 14	10th	3643
1985	Richard Petty	43	Pontiac	DAY; 34	RCH; 26	CAR; 8	ATL; 13	BRI; 8	DAR; 33	NWS; 21	MAR; 7	TAL; 27	DOV; 7	CLT; 26	RSD; 7	POC; 33	MCH; 30	DAY; 29	POC; 27	TAL; 6	MCH; 37	BRI; 8	DAR; 12	RCH; 3	DOV; 9	MAR; 22	NWS; 8	CLT; 10	CAR; 33	ATL; 10	RSD; 8			14th	3140

=== Car No. 98 history ===
In 1986, the No. 43 Pontiac switched to No. 98 and reduced to part-time, and Ron Bouchard became Curb's new driver. Valvoline replaced STP as the sponsor, and Beam remained crew chief. The No. 98 ran 18 races, Bouchard ran 17 and had top-ten finishes at the Daytona 500 and Winston 500, but struggled with engine problems during the second half of the season. Bouchard also ran a Buick at Rockingham Speedway. Dale Jarrett drove the No. 98 at Bristol Motor Speedway, bringing Busch sponsorship, starting 28th and finishing 29th.

In 1987, the team lost Valvoline as a sponsor and Bouchard left the team. The team switched to Buick, and Ed Pimm entered four races; missing the Daytona 500 in an unsponsored ride, but making the three remaining attempts: at Talladega in an unsponsored entry, Daytona in July with sponsor CP-1 Oil Boosters, and the season finale at Atlanta with Sunoco, which also signed on to be the car's sponsor the following year. Pimm did not finish any of those races, and only managed a best finish of 27th. Brad Noffsinger attempted the fall race at Riverside, but failed to qualify.

In 1988, the No. 98 Buick returned to full time as Sunoco became the team's new sponsor. Pimm qualified for two out of the first three races of the season but was replaced by rookie Brad Noffsinger. Noffsinger finished 14th at his series debut in Atlanta in the spring, however, it would be his best finish of the season. Noffsinger failed to qualify for 8 races, while the No. 98 failed to finish 7 additional times. The team did not enter the road course race at Riverside. Noffsinger finished 38th in points, Sunoco left the team, and the team shut down.

Following the sale of his Busch/Nationwide Series operation in 2011, Curb partnered with Richard Childress Racing, with Curb sponsoring and being listed as the owner for Austin Dillon's No. 98 RCR-prepared Chevrolet. Curb used the space to promote the Ronald Reagan Centennial Celebration.

=== Car No. 98 results ===
Year	Driver	No.	Make	1	2	3	4	5	6	7	8	9	10	11	12	13	14	15	16	17	18	19	20	21	22	23	24	25	26	27	28	29	30	31	32	33	34	35	36	Owners	Pts
1986	Ron Bouchard	98	Pontiac	DAY; 6	RCH; 18		ATL; 40	BRI; 25	DAR; 37	NWS; 17	MAR	TAL; 9	DOV; 27	CLT; 19	RSD	POC; 12	MCH; 36	DAY; 41	POC	TAL; 17	GLN	MCH		DAR; 30	RCH	DOV	MAR	NWS	CLT; 21	CAR	ATL; 42	RSD								N/A	N/A
1986	Ron Bouchard	98	Buick			CAR; 13																																		N/A	N/A
1986	Dale Jarrett	98	Pontiac																				BRI; 29																	N/A	N/A
1987	Ed Pimm	98	Buick	DAY; DNQ	CAR	RCH	ATL	DAR	NWS	BRI	MAR	TAL; 27	CLT	DOV	POC	RSD	MCH	DAY; 34	POC	TAL	GLN	MCH	BRI	DAR	RCH	DOV	MAR	NWS	CLT	CAR		ATL; 42								N/A	185
1987	Brad Noffsinger	98	Chevy																												RSD; DNQ									N/A	185
1988	Ed Pimm	98	Buick	DAY; 24	RCH; DNQ	CAR; 34																																		N/A	1468
1988	Brad Noffsinger	98	Buick				ATL; 14	DAR; 36	BRI; DNQ	NWS; DNQ	MAR; 21	TAL; 25	CLT; 33	DOV; 24	RSD	POC; 19	MCH; 20	DAY; DNQ	POC; 19	TAL; 22	GLN; 15	MCH; 26	BRI; 32	DAR; DNQ	RCH; DNQ	DOV; 34	MAR; DNQ	CLT; DNQ	NWS; DNQ	CAR; 37	PHO; 26	ATL; 26								N/A	1468
2011	Austin Dillon	98	Chevy	DAY	PHO	LVS	BRI	CAL	MAR	TEX	TAL	RCH	DAR	DOV	CLT	KAN	POC	MCH	SON	DAY	KEN	NHA	IND	POC	GLN	MCH	BRI	ATL	RCH	CHI	NHA	DOV	KAN; 26	CLT	TAL	MAR	TEX	PHO	HOM	51st	18

=== Further involvement ===
In 2012, Curb became listed owner (similar to his role with ThorSport in the Truck Series) and part-time sponsor of Phil Parsons Racing’s No. 98 car, a start-and-park operation in the Cup Series (the team only finishing three races out of the 36 races in 2012). The team would later commit to running full races, but would eventually be sold to Premium Motorsports halfway through the 2015 season.

== Busch/Nationwide Series ==
After the Cup Series team shut down in 1988, Curb suspended operations until 1996. The team returned to NASCAR running the Busch Series with the No. 96 car.

=== Car No. 96 history ===
Curb Racing returned to NASCAR after an 8-year hiatus in 1996 with a NASCAR Busch Series entry for 21 races. Curb partnered with Cary Agajanian, John Andretti and Donald Laird as part of an ownership group known as CAA Performance. The team fielded No. 96 Ford Thunderbirds driven by USAC driver Stevie Reeves with Reeves bringing sponsorship from Clabber Girl Baking Powder. Reeves began with a DNQ at the season opener at Daytona, got his best finish of the season the next week at Rockingham, 15th, but had five more DNQs. Clabber Girl left the team after the season.

For 1997, Reeves returned to the No. 96. Big A Auto Parts signed on for the full 30 race season. The team ran Fords in all but three races, running Chevrolets at Atlanta, Las Vegas and Richmond. Reeves finished 7th at Bristol in August, but had no other top-10s. He also had two DNQs, including missing the season finale at Homestead. Following the season, team co-owners Andretti and Laird left the team to form Andretti-Laird Motorsports, taking the No. 96 and Big A sponsorship with them. Curb Racing switched back to the No. 43 in 1998.

=== Car No. 43 history ===
In 1998, the No. 96 team switched to No. 43, which Curb had run in Cup with Richard Petty, and became known as the Curb Agajanian Performance Group. The No. 43 began the 1998 season unsponsored with Stevie Reeves driving a mix of Fords and Chevrolets. The team entered 4 of the first 10 races, with Reeves making all four. However the car had two mechanical failures and Reeves did not finish better than 30th. Brad Noffsinger took over at Charlotte. Noffsinger had previously driven for Curb in the Cup series; he entered six races and made five, however the No. 43 suffered three mechanical failures. Noffsinger was replaced by Kevin Grubb at Gateway, however Grubb crashed out of the race and was fired. Future seven-time NASCAR Sprint Cup champion Jimmie Johnson drove the season finale at Homestead. The No. 43 entered 12 races in 1998, all of them without a sponsor, qualifying for 11 and posting a best finish of 27th at the Dover spring race.

In 1999, the team returned to full-time. Shane Hall was hired to drive and Central Tractor signed on to sponsor the full season. The No. 43 began running Chevrolets full-time. Hall had a DNQ at the season opener at Daytona, had a fourth-place finish at Myrtle Beach Speedway, and finished 24th in points, but had 6 additional DNQs. Central Tractor left following the season.

Rookie Jay Sauter replaced Hall in 2000. Sponsorship of the No. 43 Chevrolet was taken over by Quality Farm & Country. Sauter nabbed eight top-tens and finished seventeenth in points, despite missing the spring Las Vegas race. The team's best finish was 4th at the season opener at Daytona. Sauter and Quality Farm returned in 2001. Sauter finished 3rd at Texas, grabbed a pole at Kentucky Speedway, scored seven top-10s, and finished nineteenth in points. However Sauter was fired after Memphis with three races to go in the season, as Morton Salt took over as sponsor and Ron Hornaday finished out the season. Hornaday would grab a top-5 at Phoenix.

In 2002, the team lost both Quality Farm and Morton sponsorship and cut back to a limited schedule, attempting four races late in the season with Hermie Sadler driving. The No. 43 Chevy had sponsorship from TNA for two of the races. Sadler made three of the four races (including both with sponsorship), but the No. 43 did not finish better than 29th.

The team continued to run part-time in 2003. Jay Sauter's brother Johnny ran 17 races in Chevrolets with Channellock sponsorship. Sauter was also running the No. 21 for Richard Childress Racing, combining for a full season. Grubb also returned to the No. 43 at the spring Nashville race, with sponsorship from music artist Jo Dee Messina, and Shelby Howard ran the fall Kansas race with Dr. Pepper. The team ran Dodges in partnership with Carroll Racing for Grubb and Howard. The team picked up their first Busch Series win at the Funai 250 at Richmond in September with Sauter in a Chevrolet.

The team started 2004 with Josh Richeson driving the No. 43 Chevrolet at Daytona with Ollie's Bargain Outlet sponsoring. At the second race of the season at Rockingham, the team switched to running Evernham Dodges and signed Aaron Fike as the driver. Ollie's continued to sponsor the team, which remained part-time. Fike and the No. 43 ran 12 races, his best finish a seventeenth at Dover.

In 2005, the No. 43 returned to full-time running both Dodges and Fords. Channellock and Jo Dee Messina, both returned to the team after a year absence. Kimberly-Clark's Kleenex brand also came on as a sponsor. The team's main drivers were Aaron and A. J. Fike, with Jeff Green running three races. Tracy Hines and Kevin Conway ran one race a piece, while road course ringers Jose Luis Ramirez and Ron Fellows also made a start. Fellows ran a Chevrolet for his race in the No. 43 at Watkins Glen, however the engine overheated early in the event. The team's best finish in 2005 was 14th at Charlotte with Aaron Fike in a Ford.

In 2006, the team returned to running Evernham Dodges. The No. 43 began the season without a full-time sponsor, however the car started the season with Aaron Fike driving full-time with race-to-race sponsorships. Fike sat 29th in points after 12 races when he failed to qualify at Charlotte and was fired. Kertus Davis took over for one race at Dover. The team then downscaled to part-time, with road racing experts P. J. Jones and Chris Cook attempting a four races each, all of them on ovals except for Cook's start at Watkins Glen. Jones made each of the fields he attempted to qualify for, while Cook made three of the four, missing the race at Richmond. Erin Crocker brought General Mills sponsorship and Evernham support at Homestead, finishing 28th. The best finish for the No. 43 in 2006 was at the July Daytona race, with P. J. Jones finishing 13th.

Due to a lack of sponsorship, the No. 43 began the 2007 season inactive. Curb and Gary Baker later bought Clarence Brewer's Ford team before the September Fontana race. Brewco's two full-time Busch Series teams, the No. 27 and No. 37, became the primary entries for Baker-Curb Racing at Fontana. However, Baker-Curb did field the No. 43 for the only time in 2007 for Bobby East at Memphis with sponsorship from Kick Butt Energy Ballz.

The No. 43 Curb entry did not appear during the 2008 season. However, at Chicagoland, Curb leased the owner points to Front Row Motorsports for Kevin Lepage, an entry that failed to qualify.

In 2009, Curb fielded the No. 43 at the spring Texas race with Josh Wise driving a car sponsored by Scott Products and county singer Star de Alzan, however Wise failed to qualify. At the fall Charlotte race, Curb leased the number 43 to Richard Petty Motorsports for driver Kasey Kahne.

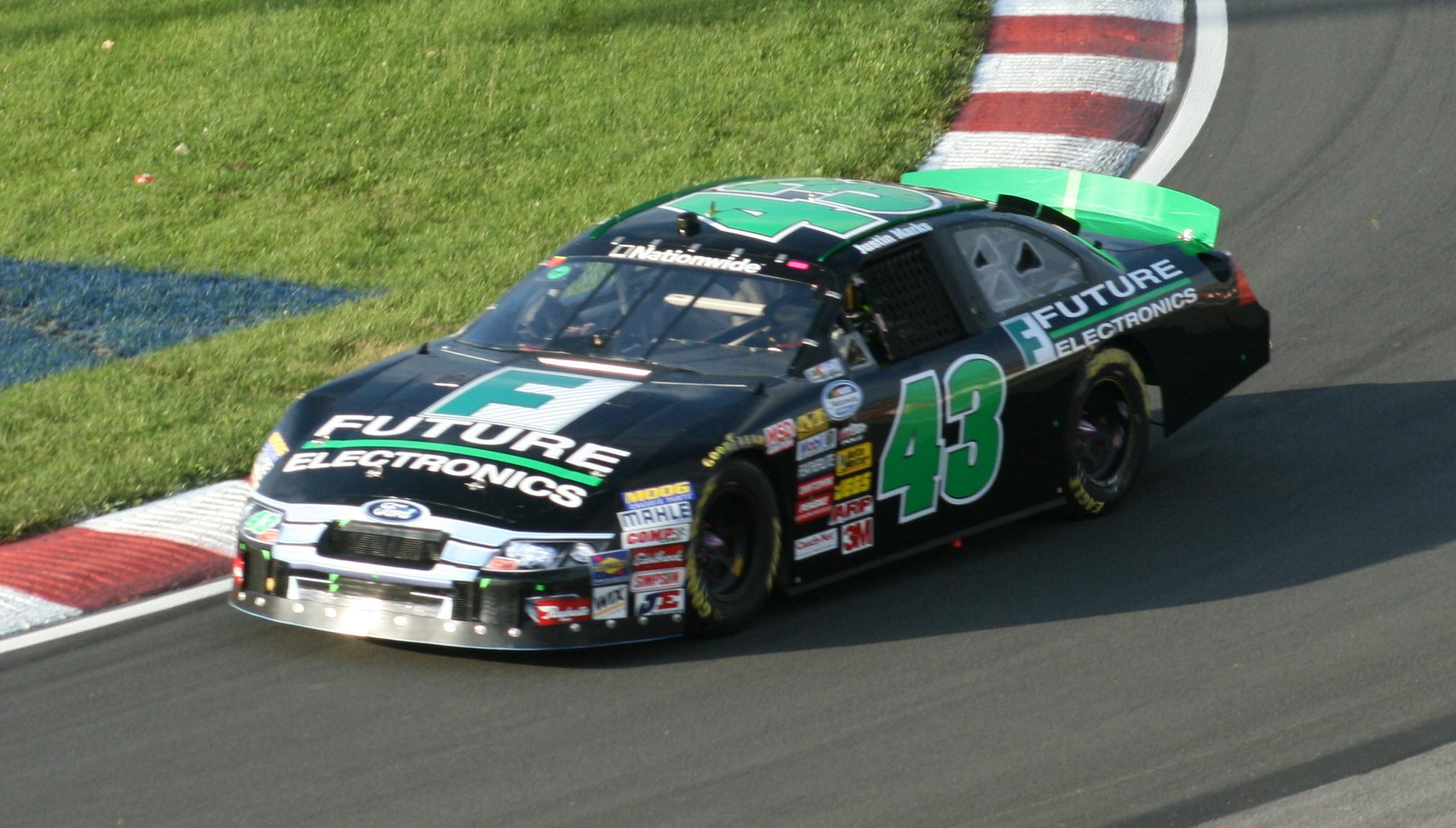
Justin Marks in 2010.

In 2010, the Baker-Curb No. 43 returned and began the season running Roush Fords full-time. Scott Lagasse Jr. was the driver, operating with race-to-race sponsorships. Lagasse Jr. ran the first 14 races, the final three without a sponsor, before leaving the team due to lack of funding. Lagasse's best finish was 8th at Phoenix. The Roush partnership dissolved at the same time Lagasse left the team, forcing Curb to lease the No. 43 points to Rick Ware Racing at Road America. The next week at Loudon, Brad Baker ran the No. 43 as a start and park without a sponsor. The following week at Daytona saw the debut of the Nationwide Series Car of Tomorrow platform. A deal was made with JD Motorsports for the No. 43 to run Chevrolets at the COT races. Johnny Chapman drove an unsponsored car at Daytona, but was taken out in the early laps by Curb's other entry, the No. 27 of Jennifer Jo Cobb. The team was forced to end the COT deal and to start and park the next 4 races with Baker and Kevin Swindell. After skipping Watkins Glen, the No. 43 returned for the next COT race at Michigan, with a new deal in place to run Dodges in COT races. Chase Austin drove with Walgreens at Michigan, but blew an engine and finished 35th. Drew Herring then failed to qualify an unsponsored Ford the next week at Bristol. The following week at Montreal, Justin Marks drove a Ford with Future Electronics but broke the rear end gear in the first corner of the first lap, finishing last. Kevin Hamlin drove the next race at Atlanta as a start and park. Curb shut down the No. 43 after Atlanta in September. The team returned for one race with Josh Wise in a Dodge COT at Charlotte with sponsorship from Ingersoll Rand. Wise finished 18th in the last race for the Curb No. 43.

=== Car No. 96/43 results ===
Year	Driver	No.	Make	1	2	3	4	5	6	7	8	9	10	11	12	13	14	15	16	17	18	19	20	21	22	23	24	25	26	27	28	29	30	31	32	33	34	35	Owners	Pts
1996	Stevie Reeves	96	Ford	DAY; DNQ	CAR; 15	RCH; DNQ	ATL; DNQ	NSV; 32	DAR; 33	BRI; DNQ	HCY	NZH	CLT; 23	DOV; 19	SBO	MYB	GLN; 23	MLW; 20	NHA	TAL; 33	IRP; 34	MCH; 34	BRI; 33	DAR; 18	RCH; 35	DOV; 17	CLT; 16	CAR; DNQ	HOM; DNQ										N/A	1290
1997	Stevie Reeves	96	Ford	DAY; 13	CAR; 21	RCH; 36			DAR; 30	HCY; 17	TEX; 33	BRI; 13	NSV; 14	TAL; 20	NHA; 26	NZH; 32	CLT; 27	DOV; 21	SBO; DNQ	GLN; 16	MLW; 27	MYB; 24	GTY; 42	IRP; 21	MCH; 29	BRI; 7	DAR; 17		DOV; 20	CLT; 24	CAL; 37	CAR; 26	HOM; DNQ						N/A	2528
1997	Stevie Reeves	96	Chevy				ATL; 28	LVS; 16																				RCH; 43											N/A	2528
1998	Stevie Reeves	43	Ford	DAY; 39	CAR; 39	LVS	NSV; 41	DAR	BRI	TEX	HCY	TAL																											N/A	N/A
1998	Stevie Reeves	43	Chevy										NHA; 30	NZH																									N/A	N/A
1998	Brad Noffsinger	43	Ford												CLT; 36													RCH; 40											N/A	N/A
1998	Brad Noffsinger	43	Chevy													DOV; 27	RCH	PPR; 29	GLN	MLW	MYB	CAL; 38	SBO	IRP; DNQ	MCH	BRI	DAR												N/A	N/A
1998	Kevin Grubb	43	Chevy																										DOV; DNQ	CLT; 40	GTY	CAR	ATL						N/A	N/A
1998	Jimmie Johnson	43	Chevy																															HOM; 33					N/A	N/A
1999	Shane Hall	43	Chevy	DAY; DNQ	CAR; 18	LVS; DNQ	ATL; DNQ	DAR; 20	TEX; DNQ	NSV; DNQ	BRI; 37	TAL; 27	CAL; DNQ	NHA; 38	RCH; 31	NZH; 23	CLT; 37	DOV; 35	SBO; DNQ	GLN; 24	MLW; 22	MYB; 4	PPR; 38	GTY; 17	IRP; 11	MCH; 21	BRI; 16	DAR; 37	RCH; 25	DOV; 14	CLT; 24	CAR; 36	MEM; 25	PHO; 25	HOM; 40				N/A	2154
2000	Jay Sauter	43	Chevy	DAY; 4	CAR; 14	LVS; DNQ	ATL; 39	DAR; 22	BRI; 31	TEX; 19	NSV; 6	TAL; 27	CAL; 10	RCH; 36	NHA; 16	CLT; 35	DOV; 30	SBO; 40	MYB; 10	GLN; 8	MLW; 27	NZH; 10	PPR; 27	GTY; 18	IRP; 32	MCH; 32	BRI; 6	DAR; 22	RCH; 25	DOV; 30	CLT; 25	CAR; 20	MEM; 9	PHO; 43	HOM; 13				N/A	3037
2001	Jay Sauter	43	Chevy	DAY; 25	CAR; 11	LVS; 10	ATL; 13	DAR; 36	BRI; 22	TEX; 3	NSH; 39	TAL; 7	CAL; 28	RCH; 10	NHA; 32	NZH; 15	CLT; 34	DOV; 23	KEN; 9	MLW; 33	GLN; 12	CHI; 38	GTY; 25	PPR; 17	IRP; 14	MCH; 15	BRI; 10	DAR; 30	RCH; 39	DOV; 18	KAN; 14	CLT; 28	MEM; 4						N/A	N/A
2001	Ron Hornaday Jr.	43	Chevy																															PHO; 4	CAR; 20	HOM; 30			N/A	N/A
2002	Hermie Sadler	43	Chevy	DAY	CAR	LVS	DAR	BRI	TEX	NSH	TAL	CAL	RCH	NHA	NZH	CLT	DOV	NSH	KEN	MLW	DAY	CHI	GTY	PPR	IRP	MCH	BRI	DAR	RCH	DOV	KAN	CLT; 29	MEM	ATL; DNQ	CAR; 33	PHO	HOM; 29		N/A	N/A
2003	Johnny Sauter	43	Chevy	DAY; 9				BRI; 10	TEX	TAL		CAL; 23	RCH; 6	GTY	NZH	CLT; 25	DOV	NSH	KEN	MLW	DAY	CHI	NHA; 25	PPR	IRP	MCH; 22	BRI; 19	DAR; 16	RCH; 1	DOV; 29		CLT; 21		ATL; 16	PHO; 9	CAR; 9	HOM		N/A	N/A
2003	Johnny Sauter	43	Dodge		CAR; 9	LVS; 31	DAR																																N/A	N/A
2003	Kevin Grubb	43	Dodge								NSH; 12																												N/A	N/A
2003	Shelby Howard	43	Dodge																												KAN; 20								N/A	N/A
2003	Justin Hobgood	43	Chevy																														MEM; 27						N/A	N/A
2004	Josh Richeson	43	Chevy	DAY; 27																																			N/A	N/A
2004	Aaron Fike	43	Dodge		CAR; 35	LVS	DAR	BRI	TEX	NSH; 39	TAL	CAL	GTY	RCH	NZH; 30	CLT	DOV	NSH	KEN	MLW	DAY	CHI	NHA	PPR	IRP; 23	MCH	BRI	CAL	RCH; 43	DOV; 17	KAN; 39	CLT; 33	MEM; 35	ATL	PHO; 34	DAR; 42	HOM; 33		N/A	N/A
2005	A. J. Fike	43	Dodge	DAY; 30								PHO; 30						NSH; 28		MLW; 32				PPR; 30	GTY; DNQ	IRP; 33									MEM; 21				N/A	N/A
2005	Tracy Hines	43	Dodge		CAL; 36																																		N/A	N/A
2005	José Luis Ramírez	43	Ford			MXC; 31																																	N/A	N/A
2005	Aaron Fike	43	Dodge				LVS; 27	ATL; DNQ			TEX; DNQ		TAL; 22								DAY; 38	CHI; 42						MCH; 34		CAL; 37						TEX; 29			N/A	N/A
2005	Jeff Green	43	Dodge						NSH; 20	BRI; 20																			BRI; 18										N/A	N/A
2005	Kevin Conway	43	Dodge											DAR; 29																									N/A	N/A
2005	Aaron Fike	43	Ford												RCH; 30		DOV; 26		KEN; 18				NHA; 24								RCH; 23	DOV; 23	KAN; 26	CLT; 14			PHO; 20	HOM; 16	N/A	N/A
2005	Todd Bodine	43	Chevy													CLT; DNQ																							N/A	N/A
2005	Ron Fellows	43	Chevy																								GLN; 42												N/A	N/A
2006	Aaron Fike	43	Dodge	DAY; 43	CAL; 36	MXC; 28	LVS; 40	ATL; 26	BRI; 18	TEX; 31	NSH; 15	PHO; 31	TAL; 23	RCH; 35	DAR; 43	CLT; DNQ																							N/A	N/A
2006	Kertus Davis	43	Dodge														DOV; 27																						N/A	N/A
2006	Chris Cook	43	Dodge															NSH; 28	KEN; 30	MLW							GLN; 34	MCH	BRI		RCH; DNQ	DOV	KAN	CLT	MEM	TEX			N/A	N/A
2006	P. J. Jones	43	Dodge																		DAY; 13	CHI	NHA	MAR	GTY	IRP; 39				CAL; 22							PHO; 21		N/A	N/A
2006	Erin Crocker	43	Dodge																																			HOM; 28	N/A	N/A
2007	Bobby East	43	Ford	DAY	CAL	MXC	LVS	ATL	BRI	NSH	TEX	PHO	TAL	RCH	DAR	CLT	DOV	NSH	KEN	MLW	NHA	DAY	CHI	GTY	IRP	CGV	GLN	MCH	BRI	CAL	RCH	DOV	KAN	CLT	MEM; 36	TEX	PHO	HOM	N/A	N/A
2009	Josh Wise	43	Ford	DAY	CAL	LVS	BRI	TEX; DNQ	NSH	PHO	TAL	RCH	DAR	CLT	DOV	NSH	KEN	MLW	NHA	DAY	CHI	GTY	IRP	IOW	GLN	MCH	BRI	CGV	ATL	RCH	DOV	KAN	CAL	CLT	MEM	TEX	PHO	HOM	N/A	0
2010	Scott Lagasse Jr.	43	Ford	DAY; 32	CAL; 15	LVS; 17	BRI; 13	NSH; 21	PHO; 8	TEX; 24	TAL; 21	RCH; 34	DAR; 36	DOV; 19	CLT; 30	NSH; 33	KEN; 16																						N/A	N/A
2010	Kevin O'COnnell	43	Chevy															ROA; 34																					N/A	N/A
2010	Brad Baker	43	Ford																NHA; 36		CHI; 34	GTY; 33		IOW; 39	GLN														N/A	N/A
2010	Johnny Chapman	43	Chevy																	DAY; 42																			N/A	N/A
2010	Kevin Swindell	43	Ford																				IRP; 33																N/A	N/A
2010	Chase Austin	43	Dodge																							MCH; 35													N/A	N/A
2010	Drew Herring	43	Ford																								BRI; DNQ												N/A	N/A
2010	Justin Marks	43	Ford																									CGV; 43											N/A	N/A
2010	Kevin Hamlin	43	Ford																										ATL; 42	RCH	DOV	KAN	CAL						N/A	N/A
2010	Josh Wise	43	Dodge																															CLT; 18	GTY	TEX	PHO	HOM	N/A	N/A

=== Car No. 27 history ===
After not fielding an entry throughout most of 2007, Curb and Gary Baker purchased Brewco Motorsports prior to the fall Fontana race. Baker-Curb Racing took over the team's entries the same weekend, taking over for the final nine races of the season. The team continued running out of Brewco's shop for the remainder of 2007, and inherited a relationship with Roush-Fenway Racing to run Fords. The No. 27 entry would continue to be sponsored by Kimberly-Clark's Kleenex brand, who had sponsored the car since 2004, and had also sponsored Curb's No. 43 entry in four races in 2005 (with Brewco's driver Aaron Fike). Jason Keller drove the No. 27 in the first race for Baker-Curb, at California Speedway, finishing 17th. For the final eight races, Bobby East, Robby Gordon, Casey Atwood and Brad Baker drove two races apiece, with a best finish of 12th by Bobby East at Homestead.

In 2008, the team moved into its own shop, and Brad Coleman was named the driver for the full-season. Kimberly-Clark brands again returned to sponsor the No. 27 Ford in most of the races, with USPS, Federated Auto Parts, and Carino's Italian Grill filling out the schedule. Coleman made each of the first 24 races, and was 16th in points, but had only two top-10 finishes. After the race at Watkins Glen, Coleman received an offer to drive for Hall of Fame Racing in the Sprint Cup Series, and left Baker-Curb as a result. David Gilliland drove the No. 27 at Michigan, with Burney Lamar running at Bristol. Gilliland returned to the No. 27 at Auto Club Speedway, and Atwood made his only start in the car at Richmond. Starting at Dover, Keller took over the No. 27 for the final seven races of the year, in preparation for a full-time run in 2009. The best run for the No. 27 in 2008 was 9th with Coleman at Las Vegas.

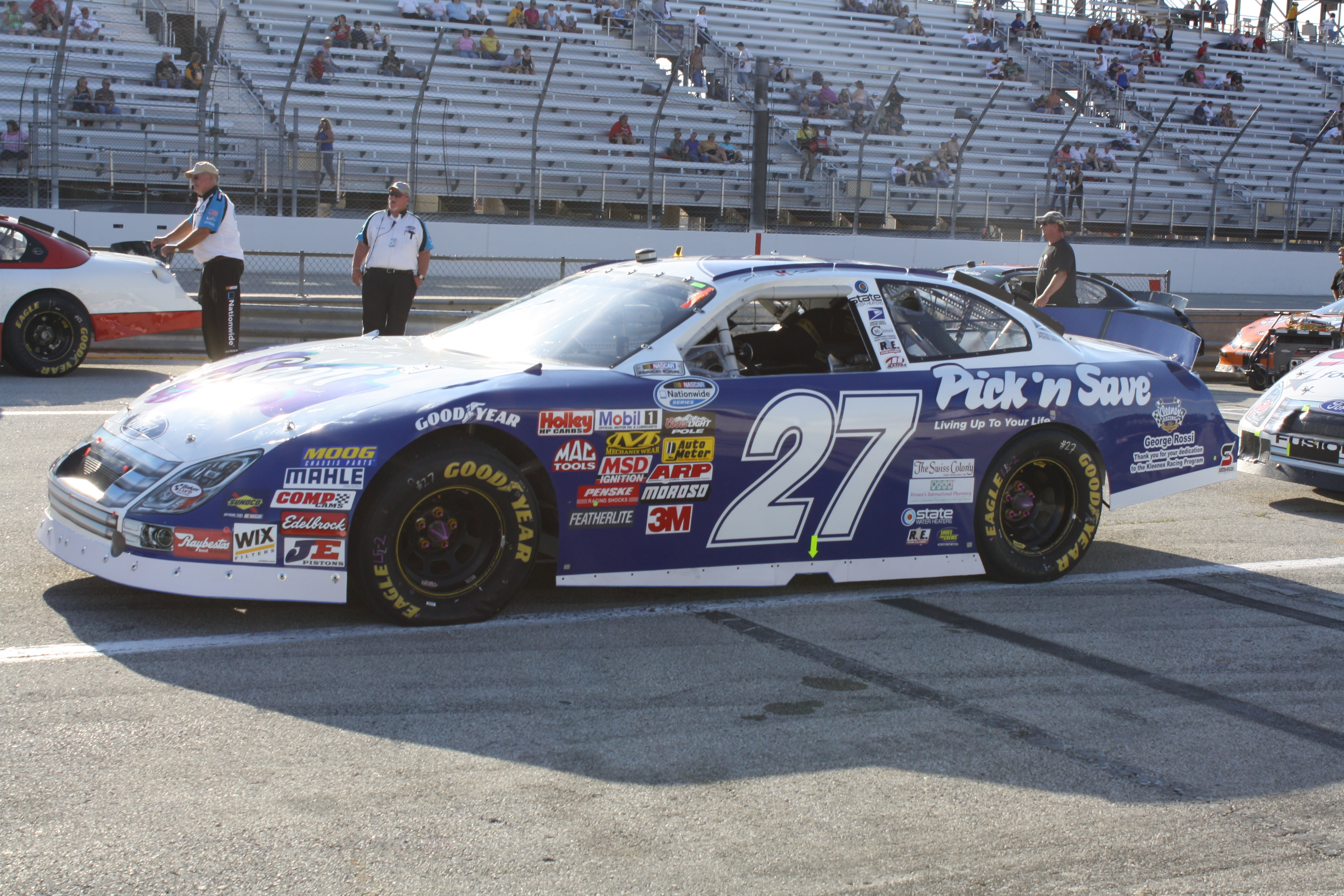
Jason Keller at Milwaukee in 2009.

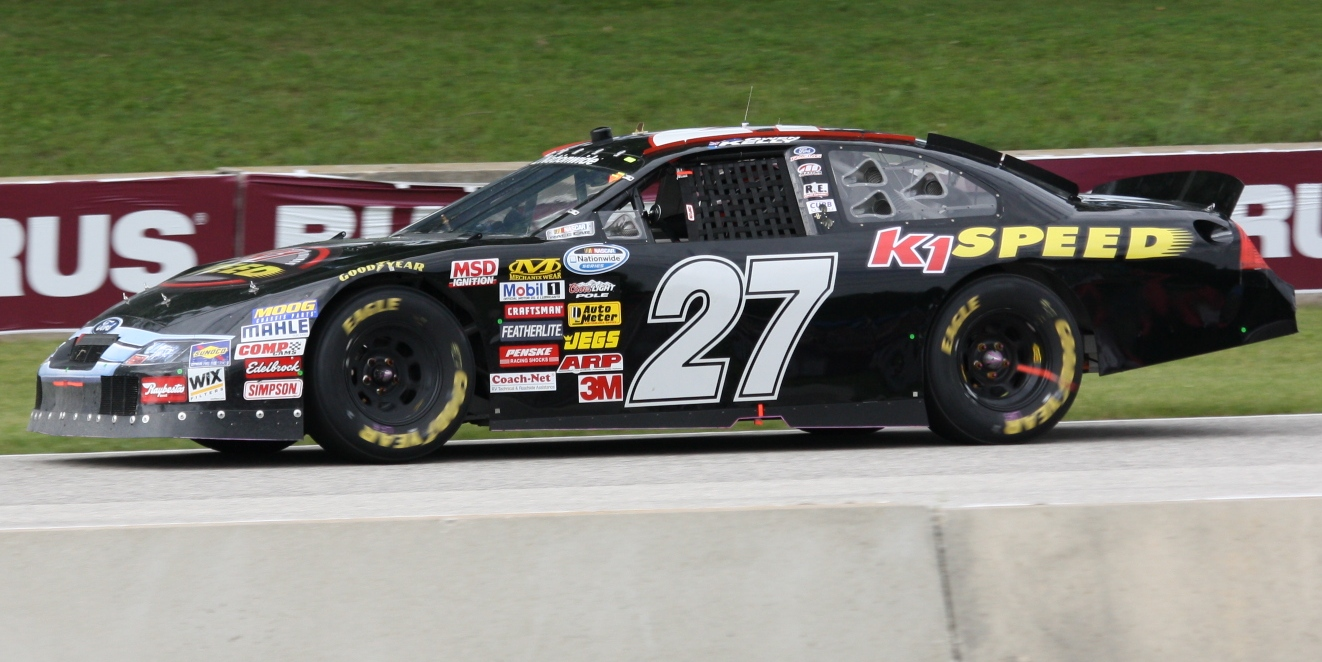
Owen Kelly at Road America in 2010.

For the 2009 season, Kimberly-Clark products returned to sponsor 34 of 36 races in the No. 27 Ford with Jason Keller running full-time. The team ran unsponsored at Watkins Glen, while USPS returned to the car at Homestead. Keller ran all the races, and finished 8th in points, recording eight top-10 finishes. The team's best finish was 6th at Iowa in August. After the season, Kimberly-Clark left the team and Keller departed for TriStar Motorsports.

In 2010, the season began with the No. 27 running Roush Fords split between Greg Biffle and Scott Wimmer with sponsorship from Red Man Tobacco (whose parent company Swedish Match had sponsored Brewco Motorsports with their Red Man and Timber Wolf brands from 1996 to 2004). Johnny Sauter drove the car at Nashville Superspeedway. After 14 races, the Red Man deal ended with new FDA regulations preventing tobacco advertising in sporting events. The Roush partnership dissolved after Kentucky, with the end of the Red Man deal. The team was forced to run only one car at Road America, leasing the No. 43 points to Rick Ware, although Owen Kelly drove the No. 27 sponsored by K1 Speed to a top-5 finish. Justin Lofton drove at Loudon with WeekendWarriors.tv sponsoring. The following week at Daytona was the first Nationwide Series race using the Car of Tomorrow platform. Initially for COT races, the No. 27 team would partner with Jennifer Jo Cobb, who brought sponsorship from Driver Boutique. Cobb would provide the COT and in return she would drive and provided the crew chief. However, the deal fell apart after Cobb destroyed the car in a crash during her first race with Baker-Curb at Daytona, an accident that also took out Baker-Curb's other entry, the No. 43 driven by Johnny Chapman. For the next seven races, seven different drivers ran the No. 27 Ford as part of one-race deals; the drivers were Lofton, Sauter, Kelly Bires, Nelson Piquet Jr., Drew Herring, Josh Wise, and Danny O'Quinn Jr. Andrew Ranger then ran the No. 27 as a Dodge for one race, running a car out of his own race shop (Dodge Dealers of Quebec was his sponsor, thus requiring him to drive Dodge equipment). Brad Baker drove an unsponsored entry at Atlanta, finishing 26th. After this, the No. 43 shut down and the No. 27 Ford became the only entry for Baker-Curb. The remainder of the season was split between Baker, Herring, Alex Kennedy and Hermie Sadler. The team had little sponsorship for the final stretch, with Baker being forced to start and park at Fontana. Chase Mattioli ran the season finale at Homestead in the No. 27 Ford with CollegeComplete.com sponsoring, finishing 33rd. The best finish for the No. 27 in 2010 was 2nd with Biffle in a Ford, at Fontana and Richmond in the spring.

After initially intending to shut down for 2011, Baker-Curb instead decided to run the No. 27 as a Ford entry for the first 5 races of the season. At Daytona, J. R. Fitzpatrick and his sponsor Schick came aboard to run the No. 27, but Fitzpatrick crashed after 10 laps and finished 42nd. Justin Marks and J. J. Yeley started and parked the next three races due to lack of sponsorship. Fitzpatrick returned to drive at Fontana, finishing 20th, with Schick again sponsoring. Baker-Curb Racing subsequently suspended operations, and three weeks later shut down. The No. 27 team was sold to Canadian businessman Steve Meehan's No. 67 team, Go Canada Racing, which Fitzpatrick would go on to drive for.

=== Car No. 27 results ===
Year	Driver	No.	Make	1	2	3	4	5	6	7	8	9	10	11	12	13	14	15	16	17	18	19	20	21	22	23	24	25	26	27	28	29	30	31	32	33	34	35	Owners	Pts
2007	Jason Keller	27	Ford	DAY	CAL	MXC	LVS	ATL	BRI	NSH	TEX	PHO	TAL	RCH	DAR	CLT	DOV	NSH	KEN	MLW	NHA	DAY	CHI	GTY	IRP	CGV	GLN	MCH	BRI	CAL; 17									N/A	N/A
2007	Bobby East	27	Ford																												RCH; 25							HOM; 12	N/A	N/A
2007	Robby Gordon	27	Ford																													DOV; 31					PHO; 20		N/A	N/A
2007	Casey Atwood	27	Ford																														KAN; 18	CLT; 22					N/A	N/A
2007	Brad Baker	27	Ford																																MEM; 34	TEX; 35			N/A	N/A
2008	Brad Coleman	27	Ford	DAY; 26	CAL; 19	LVS; 9	ATL; 35	BRI; 33	NSH; 27	TEX; 22	PHO; 23	MXC; 16	TAL; 24	RCH; 26	DAR; 12	CLT; 21	DOV; 32	NSH; 35	KEN; 15	MLW; 25	NHA; 31	DAY; 21	CHI; 30	GTY; 17	IRP; 23	CGV; 21	GLN; 10												N/A	N/A
2008	David Gilliland	27	Ford																									MCH; 20		CAL; 31									N/A	N/A
2008	Burney Lamar	27	Ford																										BRI; 27										N/A	N/A
2008	Casey Atwood	27	Ford																												RCH; 23								N/A	N/A
2008	Jason Keller	27	Ford																													DOV; 19	KAN; 19	CLT; 29	MEM; 25	TEX; 19	PHO; 13	HOM; 22	N/A	N/A
2009	Jason Keller	27	Ford	DAY; 9	CAL; 17	LVS; 25	BRI; 28	TEX; 15	NSH; 12	PHO; 17	TAL; 7	RCH; 9	DAR; 15	CLT; 16	DOV; 9	NSH; 26	KEN; 23	MLW; 20	NHA; 23	DAY; 22	CHI; 19	GTY; 9	IRP; 25	IOW; 6	GLN; 16	MCH; 20	BRI; 16	CGV; 23	ATL; 37	RCH; 15	DOV; 10	KAN; 13	CAL; 10	CLT; 17	MEM; 28	TEX; 12	PHO; 11	HOM; 13	N/A	3960
2010	Greg Biffle	27	Ford	DAY; 26	CAL; 2	LVS; 9	BRI; 6		PHO; 5	TEX; 7		RCH; 2	DAR; 35	DOV; 8	CLT; 13																								N/A	N/A
2010	Johnny Sauter	27	Ford					NSH; 13															IRP; 25																N/A	N/A
2010	Scott Wimmer	27	Ford								TAL; 12					NSH; 21	KEN; 7																						N/A	N/A
2010	Owen Kelly	27	Ford															ROA; 5																					N/A	N/A
2010	Justin Lofton	27	Ford																NHA; 17		CHI; 26																		N/A	N/A
2010	Jennifer Jo Cobb	27	Ford																	DAY; 43																			N/A	N/A
2010	Kelly Bires	27	Ford																			GTY; 32																	N/A	N/A
2010	Drew Herring	27	Ford																					IOW; 15							DOV; 32	KAN; 28			GTY; 17				N/A	N/A
2010	Nelson Piquet Jr.	27	Ford																						GLN; 7														N/A	N/A
2010	Josh Wise	27	Ford																							MCH; 40													N/A	N/A
2010	Danny O'Quinn Jr.	27	Ford																								BRI; 16												N/A	N/A
2010	Andrew Ranger	27	Dodge																									CGV; 39											N/A	N/A
2010	Brad Baker	27	Ford																										ATL; 26				CAL; 34						N/A	N/A
2010	Hermie Sadler	27	Ford																											RCH; 36				CLT; 30					N/A	N/A
2010	Alex Kennedy	27	Ford																																	TEX; 31	PHO; 24		N/A	N/A
2010	Chase Mattioli	27	Ford																																			HOM; 33	N/A	N/A
2011	J. R. Fitzpatrick	27	Ford	DAY; 42				CAL; 20	TEX	TAL	NSH	RCH	DAR	DOV	IOW	CLT	CHI	MCH	ROA	DAY	KEN	NHA	NSH	IRP	IOW	GLN	CGV	BRI	ATL	RCH	CHI	DOV	KAN	CLT	TEX	PHO	HOM		N/A	45
2011	Justin Marks	27	Ford		PHO; 40																																		N/A	45
2011	J. J. Yeley	27	Ford			LVS; 34	BRI; 39																																N/A	45

=== Car No. 37 history ===
After Gary Baker and Mike Curb purchased Brewco Motorsports in September 2007, Baker-Curb Racing took over the No. 37 Ford for the final nine races of the season. Baker-Curb also inherited the No. 37's sponsor Kick-Butt Energy Ballz. Bobby East drove the No. 37 in Baker-Curb's first race at California Speedway in Fontana, finishing 24th. The car was split over the final eight races by East, John Graham, Casey Atwood, and Brad Baker. The team's best 2007 finish in 9 attempts was a 14th-place finish at Dover by Atwood. Kick-Butt left the team after the season.

The No. 37 began 2008 running Fords out of the team's new shop, but had no sponsor. Baker began the season as the team's primary driver, running 5 of the first 6 races, with Greg Biffle running at Atlanta bringing Cub Cadet sponsorship. Burney Lamar then started and parked at Texas, John Young crashed out at Phoenix, and Raphael Martinez earned a top-20 at the Mexico City road course with Canel's and Scotiabank sponsoring. Lamar then returned for the next 7 races, running 6 as a start and park entry, with Biffle's foundation funding a full race effort at Nashville. Baker ran the full race at Daytona with RFD-TV sponsorship, finishing 27th. The No. 37 team shut down after Daytona due to lack of funding. The best 2008 finish for the team in 19 attempts was 18th with Lamar at Nashville.

The No. 37 Ford returned for the final two races of the 2009 season as a start and park entry. Kevin Hamlin drove an unsponsored car at both Phoenix and Homestead. The following season in 2010, the No. 37 Ford attempted three races in the middle of the season as a start and park entry, at Loudon and Gateway with Kevin Swindell and at Chicago with Josh Wise.

=== Car No. 37 results ===
Year	Driver	No.	Make	1	2	3	4	5	6	7	8	9	10	11	12	13	14	15	16	17	18	19	20	21	22	23	24	25	26	27	28	29	30	31	32	33	34	35	Owners	Pts
2007	Bobby East	37	Ford	DAY	CAL	MXC	LVS	ATL	BRI	NSH	TEX	PHO	TAL	RCH	DAR	CLT	DOV	NSH	KEN	MLW	NHA	DAY	CHI	GTY	IRP	CGV	GLN	MCH	BRI	CAL; 24			KAN; 22						N/A	N/A
2007	John Graham	37	Ford																												RCH; 41				MEM; 27		PHO; 26	HOM; 31	N/A	N/A
2007	Casey Atwood	37	Ford																													DOV; 14				TEX; 26			N/A	N/A
2007	Brad Baker	37	Ford																															CLT; 28					N/A	N/A
2008	Brad Baker	37	Ford	DAY; 28	CAL; 39	LVS; 35		BRI; 27	NSH; 28													DAY; 27	CHI	GTY; DNQ	IRP	CGV	GLN	MCH	BRI	CAL	RCH	DOV	KAN	CLT	MEM	TEX	PHO	HOM	N/A	N/A
2008	Greg Biffle	37	Ford				ATL; 21																																N/A	N/A
2008	Burney Lamar	37	Ford							TEX; 40				RCH; 39	DAR; 34	CLT; DNQ	DOV; 42	NSH; 18	KEN; 32	MLW; 36	NHA; 36																		N/A	N/A
2008	John Young	37	Ford								PHO; 37																												N/A	N/A
2008	Rafael Martínez	37	Ford									MXC; 20	TAL																										N/A	N/A
2009	Kevin Hamlin	37	Ford	DAY	CAL	LVS	BRI	TEX	NSH	PHO	TAL	RCH	DAR	CLT	DOV	NSH	KEN	MLW	NHA	DAY	CHI	GTY	IRP	IOW	GLN	MCH	BRI	CGV	ATL	RCH	DOV	KAN	CAL	CLT	MEM	TEX	PHO; 37	HOM; 43	N/A	N/A
2010	Kevin Swindell	37	Ford	DAY	CAL	LVS	BRI	NSH	PHO	TEX	TAL	RCH	DAR	DOV	CLT	NSH	KEN	ROA	NHA; 42	DAY		GTY; 39	IRP	IOW	GLN	MCH	BRI	CGV	ATL	RCH	DOV	KAN	CAL	CLT	GTY	TEX	PHO	HOM	N/A	N/A
2010	Josh Wise	37	Ford																		CHI; 40																		N/A	N/A

=== Car No. 97 history ===
In 2001, Phil Parsons ran a No. 97 Morton Salt Chevrolet in the Busch Grand National race at Kentucky Speedway. Parsons qualified fifth but ran into trouble and finished 34th.

=== Car No. 97 results ===
Year	Driver	No.	Make	1	2	3	4	5	6	7	8	9	10	11	12	13	14	15	16	17	18	19	20	21	22	23	24	25	26	27	28	29	30	31	32	33	Owners	Pts
2001	Phil Parsons	97	Chevy	DAY	CAR	LVS	ATL	DAR	BRI	TEX	NSH	TAL	CAL	RCH	NHA	NZH	CLT	DOV	KEN; 34	MLW	GLN	CHI	GTY	PPR	IRP	MCH	BRI	DAR	RCH	DOV	KAN	CLT	MEM	PHO	CAR	HOM	N/A	61

=== Car No. 98 history ===
Following the shutdown of the Baker-Curb's No. 37 Ford team halfway through the 2008 season, Curb-Agajanian ran an unsponsored No. 98 Chevrolet as a start and park entry with Johnny Sauter driving in two late-summer races. Sauter ran the No. 98 at Michigan and Bristol.

In 2013, Curb was listed as owner (similar to his role with ThorSport in the Truck series) of Kevin Swindell’s part-time #98 Nationwide Series ride with Biagi-DenBeste Racing.

=== Car No. 98 results ===
Year	Driver	No.	Make	1	2	3	4	5	6	7	8	9	10	11	12	13	14	15	16	17	18	19	20	21	22	23	24	25	26	27	28	29	30	31	32	33	34	35	Owners	Pts
2008	Johnny Sauter	98	Chevy	DAY	CAL	LVS	ATL	BRI	NSH	TEX	PHO	MXC	TAL	RCH	DAR	CLT	DOV	NSH	KEN	MLW	NHA	DAY	CHI	GTY	IRP	CGV	GLN	MCH; 42	BRI; 42	CAL	RCH	DOV	KAN	CLT	MEM	TEX	PHO	HOM	N/A	74

== Truck Series ==
=== Truck No. 43 history ===
In 2004, the team ran a part-time No. 43 in the NASCAR Craftsman Truck Series. The truck debuted at the Martinsville with Johnny Sauter failing to qualify a Curb Record Chevrolet. Both Johnny and his brother Jay Sauter had formerly driven for Curb in the Busch Series. The No. 43 next ran at the Milwaukee Mile with Jay and Johnny's father Jim Sauter driving a Curb Records Chevy, finishing 13th. Johnny Sauter then returned at Indianapolis Raceway Park with Curb Record again on the truck, qualifying 6th and finishing 2nd to Chad Chaffin.

After his runner-up finish, Sauter secured sponsorship from Co-Pilot for Richmond, finishing 11th in a Chevy. At Darlington Raceway, the team's then-current Busch Series driver Josh Richeson ran a Curb Records Ford. The team's final appearance of 2004 was at the season finale at Homestead-Miami Speedway, where Tim Schendel ran the No. 43 Texpar Energy Chevy, however Schendel was caught up in a wreck. The team shut down following the season.

This team was co-owned with Johnny Sauter under the name Edge Performance Group. Sauter's runner-up at IRP was as close as Curb would come to becoming the fifth (at the time) owner to win a race in all three NASCAR national series. Bill Davis (in 2005) and Gene Haas (in 2014) have since joined this club.

=== Further involvement ===
Mike Curb was first listed as the owner of ThorSport Racing's No. 13 in 2009. This coincided with Curb Records being a permanent sponsor for the team. He would be listed as the owner of the No. 13 until 2013 when his sponsorship and coinciding ownership would follow then-driver Johnny Sauter to the team's new No. 98 entry, where Curb remains listed owner to this day.

== See also ==
- Curb Agajanian Performance Group – Curb and Agajanian's open wheel racing team
- Brewco Motorsports – Owner of the No. 27 and No. 37 prior to becoming part of Baker-Curb
