= 2008 Auto Club 500 =

Race details
- Race 2 of 36 in the 2008 NASCAR Sprint Cup Series
- Track map of the speedway at Auto Club Speedway AKA California Speedway
- Date: February 24, 2008–February 25, 2008
- Location: Auto Club Speedway, Fontana, California
- Course: Permanent racing facility
- Course length: 2.0 miles (3.23 km)
- Distance: 250 laps, 500 mi (804.672 km)
- Weather: Temperatures approaching an average of 53.3 °F (11.8 °C); wind speeds up to 7 miles per hour (11 km/h)
- Average speed: 132.704 miles per hour (213.566 km/h)

Pole position
Driver	Jimmie Johnson	Hendrick Motorsports
- Time: 2007 Owner's Points

Most laps led
Driver	Jimmie Johnson	Hendrick Motorsports
- Laps: 76

Winner
No. 99	Carl Edwards	Roush Fenway Racing

Television in the United States
- Network: Fox Broadcasting Company
- Announcers: Mike Joy, Darrell Waltrip and Larry McReynolds
- Nielsen ratings: 1.6/3 (1.4) (Final)

The 2008 Auto Club 500 was the second race of the 2008 NASCAR Sprint Cup Series, and started on February 24, 2008, at Auto Club Speedway of Southern California in Fontana, California, a suburb of Los Angeles. The race was telecast on Fox starting at 3:30 PM EST/12:30 PM PST, with MRN and Sirius Satellite Radio's broadcast starting at 2:45 PM EST/11:45 AM PST. Rain stopped the race on Lap 87 and the race would continue on Monday, February 25 at 1 PM US EST/10 AM PDT.

This race was the first time that the Car of Tomorrow raced at Fontana, as many people (since the shift from the North Carolina Speedway in Rockingham, North Carolina following the Ferko lawsuit in 2004) claim that it is the first "real race" of the season, following the running of the Daytona 500 with its restrictor plates in use.

== Pre-Race News ==
- Boris Said was an early entry, but withdrew. Mike Skinner was to have replaced Jacques Villeneuve in the #27 Bill Davis Racing Toyota, while Nationwide Series regular Burney Lamar was to replace Carl Long in the #08 Dodge, however, with the cancellation of qualifying due to rain, neither made the field. Villeneuve will look for a ride (and sponsorship) in both Sprint Cup and Nationwide series.
- Kurt Busch was docked 25 points and fined $25,000 after saying a profanity on live television during qualifying. This was the same penalty handed out when Tony Stewart uttered the same profanity after winning the 2007 Brickyard 400 the previous year.

== Qualifying ==
For the first time in the Sprint Cup Series, a new qualifying system was to have been introduced for this race and the rest of the 2008 season.

The new qualifying format is being divided into two groups, that has been called by many as "The Boris Said Rule" after what happened prior to the 2007 Pepsi 400, when Said was on the provisional pole when qualifying was canceled, and the field was set by the rulebook. The format debuted in the Nationwide and Craftsman Truck series at Daytona.

In the first group, the Top 35 Exempt teams will go onto the track first and set their positions in the time trials. The second group will involve those outside said Top 35, and will fill the remaining eight spots. However, rain canceled the scheduled qualifying session, and the field was set by the NASCAR rulebook. The first time that the new qualifying session format was used was at the UAW-Dodge 400 the following week in Las Vegas, Nevada.

== Race ==
The outset of the race was plagued with rain, which was an ongoing theme throughout the weekend, delaying the start by 2½ hours, but weeping in the banked turns from all the inclement weather that fell throughout the weekend because of poor drainage caused the first two cautions. On Lap 14, Denny Hamlin hit the wall in Turn 3, causing the first caution of the day. After just two more laps of green, Casey Mears crashed into Dale Earnhardt Jr., and Sam Hornish Jr., who was blinded from the upraised hood who then hit Reed Sorenson and then turned Mears' car 270 degrees, setting Hornish's car ablaze and causing the first red flag of the race on Lap 21. Track dryers were brought out to clear the track, and concrete saws were used to create pathways for the water to flow off Turns 1 and 2, which was not draining properly. After hour and seven minute delay, racing continued on Lap 25 before a caution was called on Lap 39 due to rain in Turn 4. After drying finished, racing began again on Lap 47 before a yellow flag was shown on Lap 56 due to Jeremy Mayfield's flat tire. Another yellow flag was shown when Joe Nemechek spins out due to a flat tire on Lap 62. Eight laps afterward, the sixth caution flag was shown when Elliott Sadler hit the wall after attempting to avoid Robby Gordon. The seventh caution flag was displayed on Lap 81 when rain began to fall, and was finally called off officially on Lap 87 with a red flag, over five hours after the scheduled start of the race.

NASCAR continued to dry the track and scheduled a night restart at 9 PM PST. That time was postponed twice by an hour to 11 PM local time, when they felt that track drying was inadequate. Ultimately at the time the race was to have restarted, NASCAR officials suspended activities for the evening. When action resumed on Monday morning, Jimmie Johnson led the race when on Lap 132, Jeff Burton brushed the wall on Turn 3 to force the eighth caution period. Three more cautions would follow, ultimately letting Carl Edwards win the race under caution when Dale Jarrett spun in Turn 3 on the last lap. Mark Martin made his 800th career Winston/NEXTEL/Sprint Cup start in this race.

=== Timeline ===
- Formation Laps: start delayed as M. Waltrip #55 spills oil onto racetrack.
- Lap 14: 1st CAUTION - D. Hamlin #11 hits wall after slipping on damp part of racetrack. Harvick gets longest line penalty for pitting when pits were closed under caution
- Lap 21: RED FLAG - C. Mears #5 hits wall, collects D. Earnhardt Jr. #88, R. Sorenson #41 hits S. Hornish #77, S. Hornish turns C. Mears onto roof. 1 hour 7 min delay for track preparations
- Lap 39: 3rd CAUTION - rain
- Lap 35: J. Gordon #24 sacrifices dominant lead to slot in behind J. Johnson #48 to suck débris from Gordon's car
- Lap 56: 4th CAUTION - J. Mayfield #70 has flat tire
- Lap 60: J. Gordon #24 dominates, leading 45 of 60 laps
- Lap 62: 5th CAUTION - J. Nemechek #78 has flat tire and crashes
- Lap 70: 6th CAUTION - E. Sadler #19 crashes taking evasive action to avoid R. Gordon #7 who got loose, striking the wall, but saves it from spinning
- Lap 81: 7th CAUTION - rain
- Lap 87: RED FLAG - rain, race abandoned for day, delay of 15 hours, 49 minutes
- Lap 123: Green flag pitstops start
- Lap 134: 8th CAUTION - J. Burton #31 hits wall
- Lap 150: 9th CAUTION - M. Waltrip #55 crashes
- Lap 167: 10th CAUTION - D. Jarrett #44 loses tire tread, caution for débris
- Lap 208: Green flag pitstops start
- Lap 219: 11th CAUTION - J. Mayfield #70 hits wall
- Lap 237: C. Edwards #99 gains lead from J. Johnson #48
- Lap 250: 12th CAUTION - D. Jarrett #44 crashes on white flag lap, so race finishes under yellow.

Top Ten Finishers
Pos	Car #	Driver	Make	Team
1	99	Carl Edwards	Ford	Roush Fenway Racing
2	48	Jimmie Johnson	Chevrolet	Hendrick Motorsports
3	24	Jeff Gordon	Chevrolet	Hendrick Motorsports
4	18	Kyle Busch	Toyota	Joe Gibbs Racing
5	17	Matt Kenseth	Ford	Roush Fenway Racing
6	1	Martin Truex Jr.	Chevrolet	Dale Earnhardt, Inc.
7	20	Tony Stewart	Toyota	Joe Gibbs Racing
8	29	Kevin Harvick	Chevrolet	Richard Childress Racing
9	9	Kasey Kahne	Dodge	Gillett Evernham Motorsports
10	12	Ryan Newman	Dodge	Penske Racing

Failed to make the race as a result of qualifying being canceled due to rain: A. J. Allmendinger (#84), Ken Schrader (#49), Mike Skinner (#27), Burney Lamar (#08), Patrick Carpentier (#10).

Previous race: 2008 Daytona 500	Sprint Cup Series; 2008 season	Next race: 2008 UAW-Dodge 400
