= 2007 Dickies 500 =

Race details
- Race 34 of 36 in the 2007 NASCAR Nextel Cup Series season
- The 2007 Dickies 500 program cover, with artwork by former NASCAR artist Sam Bass.
- Date: November 4, 2007
- Location: Texas Motor Speedway, Fort Worth, Texas
- Course: Permanent racing facility
- Course length: 1.5 miles (2.414 km)
- Distance: 334 laps, 501 mi (806.281 km)
- Weather: Temperatures reaching up to 82 °F (28 °C); wind speeds up to 14 miles per hour (23 km/h)
- Average speed: 131.219 miles per hour (211.177 km/h)

Pole position
Driver	Martin Truex Jr.	Dale Earnhardt, Inc.
- Time: 27.964

Most laps led
Driver	Kyle Busch	Hendrick Motorsports
- Laps: 153

Winner
No. 48	Jimmie Johnson	Hendrick Motorsports

Television in the United States
- Network: ABC
- Announcers: Jerry Punch, Rusty Wallace and Andy Petree

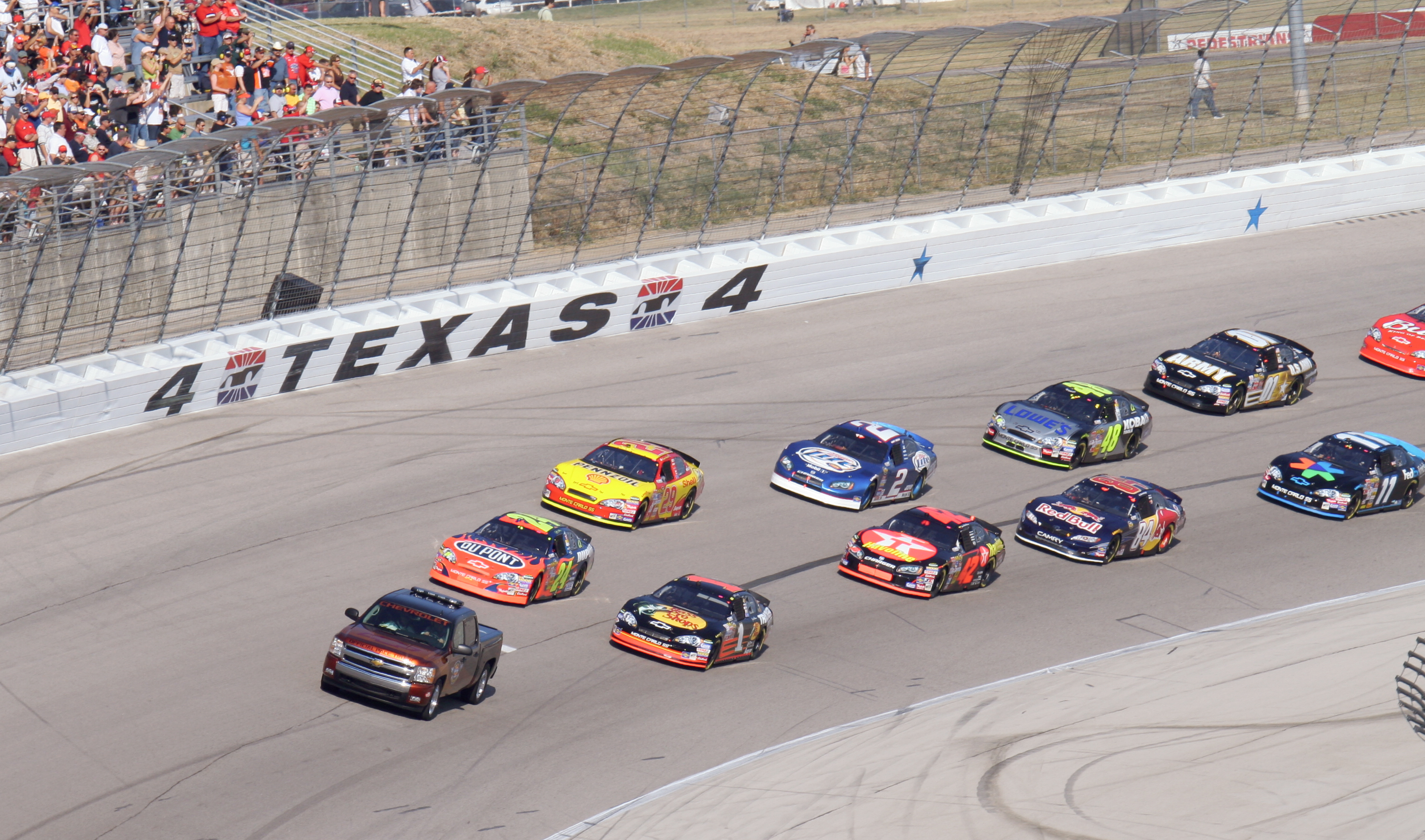
The pace car leading the field

The 2007 Dickies 500 was the 34th race in the 2007 NASCAR Nextel Cup season and the third to last race in the 2007 Chase for the Nextel Cup. This race took place on Sunday, November 4, at Texas Motor Speedway in Fort Worth, Texas.

The layout of Texas Motor Speedway, where the race was held.

== Background ==
Entry list
#	Driver	Team	Make	Sponsor
00	David Reutimann	Michael Waltrip Racing	Toyota	Burger King
1	Martin Truex Jr.	Dale Earnhardt, Inc.	Chevrolet	Bass Pro Shops, Tracker Boats
01	Mark Martin	Dale Earnhardt, Inc.	Chevrolet	U.S. Army
2	Kurt Busch	Penske Racing	Dodge	Miller Lite
4	Ward Burton	Morgan–McClure Motorsports	Chevrolet	Lucas Oil, State Water Heaters
5	Kyle Busch	Hendrick Motorsports	Chevrolet	CARQUEST Auto Parts, Kellogg's
6	David Ragan	Roush Fenway Racing	Ford	AAA Insurance
7	Robby Gordon	Robby Gordon Motorsports	Ford	Menards, MAPEI
07	Clint Bowyer	Richard Childress Racing	Chevrolet	Jack Daniel's
8	Dale Earnhardt Jr.	Dale Earnhardt, Inc.	Chevrolet	Budweiser
08	Burney Lamar	E&M Motorsports	Dodge	Rhino's Energy Drink
9	Kasey Kahne	Gillett Evernham Motorsports	Dodge	Dodge Dealers, UAW
10	Scott Riggs	Gillett Evernham Motorsports	Dodge	Proto, Stanley Tools, Valvoline
11	Denny Hamlin	Joe Gibbs Racing	Chevrolet	FedEx Kinko's
12	Ryan Newman	Penske Racing	Dodge	Alltel
15	Paul Menard	Dale Earnhardt, Inc.	Chevrolet	Menards, Moen
16	Greg Biffle	Roush Fenway Racing	Ford	Jackson Hewitt
17	Matt Kenseth	Roush Fenway Racing	Ford	USG
18	J.J. Yeley	Joe Gibbs Racing	Chevrolet	Interstate Batteries
19	Elliott Sadler	Gillett Evernham Motorsports	Dodge	Dodge Dealers, UAW
20	Tony Stewart	Joe Gibbs Racing	Chevrolet	The Home Depot
21	Bill Elliott	Wood Brothers Racing	Ford	Delimex
22	Dave Blaney	Bill Davis Racing	Toyota	Caterpillar
24	Jeff Gordon	Hendrick Motorsports	Chevrolet	DuPont
25	Casey Mears	Hendrick Motorsports	Chevrolet	National Guard, GMAC
26	Jamie McMurray	Roush Fenway Racing	Ford	Crown Royal Special Reserve
29	Kevin Harvick	Richard Childress Racing	Chevrolet	Shell, Pennzoil
31	Jeff Burton	Richard Childress Racing	Chevrolet	AT&T Mobility
34	Kevin Lepage	Front Row Motorsports	Dodge	MyAutoLoan.com
36	Mike Skinner	Bill Davis Racing	Toyota	360 OTC
38	David Gilliland	Robert Yates Racing	Ford	M&M's
40	David Stremme	Chip Ganassi Racing	Dodge	HomeLife Communities
41	Reed Sorenson	Chip Ganassi Racing	Dodge	Target
42	Juan Pablo Montoya	Chip Ganassi Racing	Dodge	Texaco, Havoline
43	Bobby Labonte	Petty Enterprises	Dodge	Cheerios Spoonfuls of Stories
44	Dale Jarrett	Michael Waltrip Racing	Toyota	UPS
45	Kyle Petty	Petty Enterprises	Dodge	National Tire & Battery
48	Jimmie Johnson	Hendrick Motorsports	Chevrolet	Lowe's, Kobalt Tools
49	John Andretti	BAM Racing	Dodge	Paralyzed Veterans of America
55	Michael Waltrip	Michael Waltrip Racing	Toyota	NAPA Auto Parts
66	Jeremy Mayfield	Haas CNC Racing	Chevrolet	Best Buy
70	Johnny Sauter	Haas CNC Racing	Chevrolet	FleetPride
78	Joe Nemechek	Furniture Row Racing	Chevrolet	Furniture Row
83	Brian Vickers	Red Bull Racing Team	Toyota	Red Bull
84	A.J. Allmendinger	Red Bull Racing Team	Toyota	Red Bull
88	Ricky Rudd	Robert Yates Racing	Ford	Snickers
96	Tony Raines	Hall of Fame Racing	Chevrolet	DLP HDTV
99	Carl Edwards	Roush Fenway Racing	Ford	Office Depot

== Qualifying ==
With a fast lap at 27.964 sec. at a speed of 193.105 mph, Chase driver Martin Truex Jr. won his first career pole. On his outside will be points leader Jeff Gordon. Defending race winner Tony Stewart rolls off 15th, defending champion Jimmie Johnson starts 8th, and darkhorse candidate Clint Bowyer starts 29th. Of note, open wheel imports Juan Pablo Montoya and A. J. Allmendinger will roll of 3rd and 5th, a personal best for Allmendinger, and second best for Montoya. Truex also becomes the 17th different driver to win a pole, tying a record originally set in the 1997 season and matched in the 2001 season.

Pos.	#	Driver	Make	Team	Time	Speed
1	1	Martin Truex Jr.	Chevrolet	Dale Earnhardt, Inc.	27.964	193.105
2	24	Jeff Gordon	Chevrolet	Hendrick Motorsports	28.063	192.424
3	42	Juan Pablo Montoya	Dodge	Chip Ganassi Racing	28.064	192.417
4	29	Kevin Harvick	Chevrolet	Richard Childress Racing	28.090	192.239
5	84	A.J. Allmendinger	Toyota	Red Bull Racing Team	28.090	192.239
6	2	Kurt Busch	Dodge	Penske Racing	28.101	192.164
7	11	Denny Hamlin	Chevrolet	Joe Gibbs Racing	28.106	192.130
8	48	Jimmie Johnson	Chevrolet	Hendrick Motorsports	28.115	192.068
9	25	Casey Mears	Chevrolet	Hendrick Motorsports	28.139	191.904
10	01	Mark Martin	Chevrolet	Dale Earnhardt, Inc.	28.183	191.605
11	12	Ryan Newman	Dodge	Penske Racing	28.190	191.557
12	8	Dale Earnhardt Jr.	Chevrolet	Dale Earnhardt, Inc.	28.206	191.449
13	43	Bobby Labonte	Dodge	Petty Enterprises	28.215	191.388
14	36	Mike Skinner	Toyota	Bill Davis Racing	28.216	191.381
15	20	Tony Stewart	Chevrolet	Joe Gibbs Racing	28.224	191.327
16	15	Paul Menard	Chevrolet	Dale Earnhardt, Inc.	28.230	191.286
17	5	Kyle Busch	Chevrolet	Hendrick Motorsports	28.232	191.272
18	17	Matt Kenseth	Ford	Roush Fenway Racing	28.244	191.191
19	19	Elliott Sadler	Dodge	Gillett Evernham Motorsports	28.269	191.022
20	10	Scott Riggs	Dodge	Gillett Evernham Motorsports	28.269	191.022
21	99	Carl Edwards	Ford	Roush Fenway Racing	28.275	190.981
22	83	Brian Vickers	Toyota	Red Bull Racing Team	28.281	190.941
23	16	Greg Biffle	Ford	Roush Fenway Racing	28.289	190.887
24	26	Jamie McMurray	Ford	Roush Fenway Racing	28.300	190.813
25	9	Kasey Kahne	Dodge	Gillett Evernham Motorsports	28.322	190.665
26	44	Dale Jarrett	Toyota	Michael Waltrip Racing	28.322	190.665
27	31	Jeff Burton	Chevrolet	Richard Childress Racing	28.336	190.570
28	40	David Stremme	Dodge	Chip Ganassi Racing	28.350	190.476
29	07	Clint Bowyer	Chevrolet	Richard Childress Racing	28.394	190.181
30	21	Bill Elliott	Ford	Wood Brothers Racing	28.416	190.034
31	41	Reed Sorenson	Dodge	Chip Ganassi Racing	28.442	189.860
32	22	Dave Blaney	Toyota	Bill Davis Racing	28.448	189.820
33	6	David Ragan	Ford	Roush Fenway Racing	28.450	189.807
34	38	David Gilliland	Ford	Robert Yates Racing	28.475	189.640
35	78	Joe Nemechek	Chevrolet	Furniture Row Racing	28.478	189.620
36	66	Jeremy Mayfield	Chevrolet	Haas CNC Racing	28.484	189.580
37	45	Kyle Petty	Dodge	Petty Enterprises	28.518	189.354
38	18	J.J. Yeley	Chevrolet	Joe Gibbs Racing	28.706	188.114
39	88	Ricky Rudd	Ford	Robert Yates Racing	28.726	187.983
40	96	Tony Raines	Chevrolet	Hall of Fame Racing	28.737	187.911
41	7	Robby Gordon	Ford	Robby Gordon Motorsports	28.831	187.298
42	70	Johnny Sauter	Chevrolet	Haas CNC Racing	28.931	186.651
43	00	David Reutimann	Toyota	Michael Waltrip Racing	28.523	189.321
Failed to qualify
44	4	Ward Burton	Chevrolet	Morgan–McClure Motorsports	28.559	189.082
45	49	John Andretti	Dodge	BAM Racing	28.584	188.917
46	55	Michael Waltrip	Toyota	Michael Waltrip Racing	28.657	188.436
47	08	Burney Lamar	Dodge	E&M Motorsports	28.967	186.419
48	34	Kevin Lepage	Dodge	Front Row Motorsports	29.295	184.332

Failed to Qualify: #4-Ward Burton, #49-John Andretti, #55-Michael Waltrip, #08-Burney Lamar, #34-Kevin Lepage.

== Race ==
The race would mostly be dominated by Kyle Busch, who led for 153 laps. Chase drivers such as Jeff Burton, Kevin Harvick, Kurt Busch, Matt Kenseth, Denny Hamlin, and Truex saw their hopes for title contention end. On the final pit stop Robbie Reiser, Kenseth's crew chief, called his pit crew to only change two tires. This got them the track position, but not very many cars followed their strategy. One of those cars was of Jimmie Johnson. With four fresh tires, Jimmie hunted down Kenseth and the two of them staged a brilliant and intense duel, staying side by side for more than a lap. Johnson would eventually prevail with two to go and take his third consecutive win and take the points lead away from teammate Jeff Gordon.

Nine drivers in the Chase for the NEXTEL Cup finished in the top 11 of the overall running order.

== Results ==
Fin	St	#	Driver	Make	Team	Sponsor	Laps	Led	Status	Pts	Winnings
1	8	48	Jimmie Johnson	Chevrolet	Hendrick Motorsports	Lowe's, Kobalt Tools	334	9	running	190	$486,211
2	18	17	Matt Kenseth	Ford	Roush Fenway Racing	USG	334	44	running	175	$378,041
3	1	1	Martin Truex Jr.	Chevrolet	Dale Earnhardt, Inc.	Bass Pro Shops, Tracker Boats	334	16	running	170	$262,245
4	17	5	Kyle Busch	Chevrolet	Hendrick Motorsports	CARQUEST Auto Parts, Kellogg's	334	153	running	170	$217,400
5	11	12	Ryan Newman	Dodge	Penske Racing	Alltel	334	4	running	160	$214,125
6	27	31	Jeff Burton	Chevrolet	Richard Childress Racing	AT&T Mobility	334	0	running	150	$192,116
7	2	24	Jeff Gordon	Chevrolet	Hendrick Motorsports	DuPont	334	20	running	151	$184,561
8	6	2	Kurt Busch	Dodge	Penske Racing	Miller Lite	334	10	running	147	$165,783
9	24	26	Jamie McMurray	Ford	Roush Fenway Racing	Crown Royal Special Reserve	334	0	running	138	$134,925
10	4	29	Kevin Harvick	Chevrolet	Richard Childress Racing	Shell, Pennzoil	334	0	running	134	$168,261
11	15	20	Tony Stewart	Chevrolet	Joe Gibbs Racing	Home Depot	334	0	running	130	$159,361
12	19	19	Elliott Sadler	Dodge	Gillett Evernham Motorsports	Dodge Dealers, UAW	334	0	running	127	$131,620
13	20	10	Scott Riggs	Dodge	Gillett Evernham Motorsports	Proto, Stanley Tools, Valvoline	334	0	running	124	$118,325
14	12	8	Dale Earnhardt Jr.	Chevrolet	Dale Earnhardt, Inc.	Budweiser	334	12	running	126	$147,058
15	39	88	Ricky Rudd	Ford	Robert Yates Racing	Snickers	334	10	running	123	$141,758
16	13	43	Bobby Labonte	Dodge	Petty Enterprises	Cheerios Spoonfuls of Stories	334	0	running	115	$141,561
17	38	18	J.J. Yeley	Chevrolet	Joe Gibbs Racing	Interstate Batteries	333	0	running	112	$131,133
18	25	9	Kasey Kahne	Dodge	Gillett Evernham Motorsports	Dodge Dealers, UAW	332	0	running	109	$146,266
19	29	07	Clint Bowyer	Chevrolet	Richard Childress Racing	Jack Daniel's	332	1	running	111	$110,425
20	40	96	Tony Raines	Chevrolet	Hall of Fame Racing	DLP HDTV	332	0	running	103	$113,275
21	32	22	Dave Blaney	Toyota	Bill Davis Racing	Caterpillar	332	0	running	100	$127,908
22	36	66	Jeremy Mayfield	Chevrolet	Haas CNC Racing	Best Buy	332	0	running	97	$125,583
23	22	83	Brian Vickers	Toyota	Red Bull Racing Team	Red Bull	332	0	running	94	$101,125
24	14	36	Mike Skinner	Toyota	Bill Davis Racing	360 OTC	331	0	running	91	$98,575
25	3	42	Juan Pablo Montoya	Dodge	Chip Ganassi Racing	Texaco, Havoline	331	10	running	93	$143,300
26	21	99	Carl Edwards	Ford	Roush Fenway Racing	Office Depot	331	0	running	85	$108,625
27	42	70	Johnny Sauter	Chevrolet	Haas CNC Racing	FleetPride	330	0	running	82	$100,025
28	34	38	David Gilliland	Ford	Robert Yates Racing	M&M's	330	0	running	79	$127,039
29	7	11	Denny Hamlin	Chevrolet	Joe Gibbs Racing	FedEx Kinko's	324	45	running	81	$115,625
30	16	15	Paul Menard	Chevrolet	Dale Earnhardt, Inc.	Menards, Moen	322	0	running	73	$99,425
31	9	25	Casey Mears	Chevrolet	Hendrick Motorsports	National Guard, GMAC	302	0	running	70	$114,225
32	41	7	Robby Gordon	Ford	Robby Gordon Motorsports	Menards, MAPEI	300	0	running	67	$96,025
33	23	16	Greg Biffle	Ford	Roush Fenway Racing	Jackson Hewitt	295	0	oil cooler	64	$114,775
34	10	01	Mark Martin	Chevrolet	Dale Earnhardt, Inc.	U.S. Army	278	0	running	61	$103,625
35	35	78	Joe Nemechek	Chevrolet	Furniture Row Racing	Furniture Row	275	0	brakes	58	$95,425
36	30	21	Bill Elliott	Ford	Wood Brothers Racing	Delimex	248	0	running	55	$114,414
37	33	6	David Ragan	Ford	Roush Fenway Racing	AAA Insurance	222	0	crash	52	$130,825
38	26	44	Dale Jarrett	Toyota	Michael Waltrip Racing	UPS	217	0	crash	49	$94,800
39	5	84	A.J. Allmendinger	Toyota	Red Bull Racing Team	Red Bull	151	0	crash	46	$94,600
40	31	41	Reed Sorenson	Dodge	Chip Ganassi Racing	Target	143	0	crash	43	$116,558
41	28	40	David Stremme	Dodge	Chip Ganassi Racing	HomeLife Communities	136	0	crash	40	$94,180
42	37	45	Kyle Petty	Dodge	Petty Enterprises	National Tire & Battery	129	0	crash	37	$105,638
43	43	00	David Reutimann	Toyota	Michael Waltrip Racing	Burger King	90	0	engine	34	$103,608
Failed to qualify
44		4	Ward Burton	Chevrolet	Morgan–McClure Motorsports	Lucas Oil, State Water Heaters					
45		49	John Andretti	Dodge	BAM Racing	Paralyzed Veterans of America					
46		55	Michael Waltrip	Toyota	Michael Waltrip Racing	NAPA Auto Parts					
47		08	Burney Lamar	Dodge	E&M Motorsports	Rhino's Energy Drink					
48		34	Kevin Lepage	Dodge	Front Row Motorsports	MyAutoLoan.com					

== Points ==
- As mentioned above, Johnson took over the points lead, 30 points ahead of Gordon. Ironically, if the system that NASCAR used before the Chase started (1975-2003) was still in use, Gordon would have clinched the title after this race.
- For the last guaranteed spot in each race, the 22 team (Bill Davis Racing) expanded its lead over the 21 team (Wood Brothers/JTG Racing) to 127 points. Bill Elliott crashed out of the race, not helping the latter team's chances.

== Other note ==
Johnson won his third consecutive race; he has the last two such streaks. He also won three straight in the 2004 season (Charlotte, Martinsville, and Atlanta).

This race was the 396th and final win for the Chevrolet Monte Carlo in the NASCAR Cup Series. The model would be replaced by the Chevrolet Impala because of the Car of Tomorrow fully replacing the Generation 4 cars at the start of the 2008 Nascar Sprint Cup Series.

Previous race: 2007 Pep Boys Auto 500	Nextel Cup Series; 2007 season	Next race: 2007 Checker Auto Parts 500
