= Gary Baker (racing driver) =

American racing driver

Gary Baker is a former NASCAR driver. He made one Winston Cup start at Talladega Superspeedway in 1980. He started 15th and finished 22nd, earning $3,440. He was driving the No. 4 Waylon Jennings Chevrolet fielded by G. C. Spencer. He is also the father of Brad Baker, who also raced in NASCAR.

In 1977, Baker and fellow Nashville businessman Lanny Hester bought Bristol Motor Speedway for $1 million.

In 2007, Baker and Mike Curb purchased the Busch Series team Brewco Motorsports, quickly renaming it to Baker Curb Racing.
