= Johnny Carino's =

United States-based chain of restaurants

- Type: Wholly owned subsidiary
- Industry: Restaurants
- Genre: Casual dining
- Founded: Austin, Texas, 1992; 34 years ago
- Headquarters: Austin, Texas
- Number of locations: 26 (March 16, 2025)
- Parent: Fired Up Restaurant Concepts.
- Website: carinos.com

Johnny Carino's is a United States-based chain of Italian food casual dining restaurants. Headquartered in Austin, Texas, the concept is owned by Fired Up, Inc., which was founded in 1997 by partners and former Brinker International executives Norman Abdallah and Creed Ford III.

Johnny Carino's operated as Spageddies, prior to its 1997 acquisition by Fired Up. Spageddies, in turn, was founded in 1992 by Brinker International.

The company filed for bankruptcy protection on March 31, 2014, and again declared bankruptcy in 2016. The filings were concurrent with the closing of several Carino's locations; while Carino's once owned or franchised more than 170 restaurants across the United States, as of August 31, 2023, only 37 Carino's locations still operate.

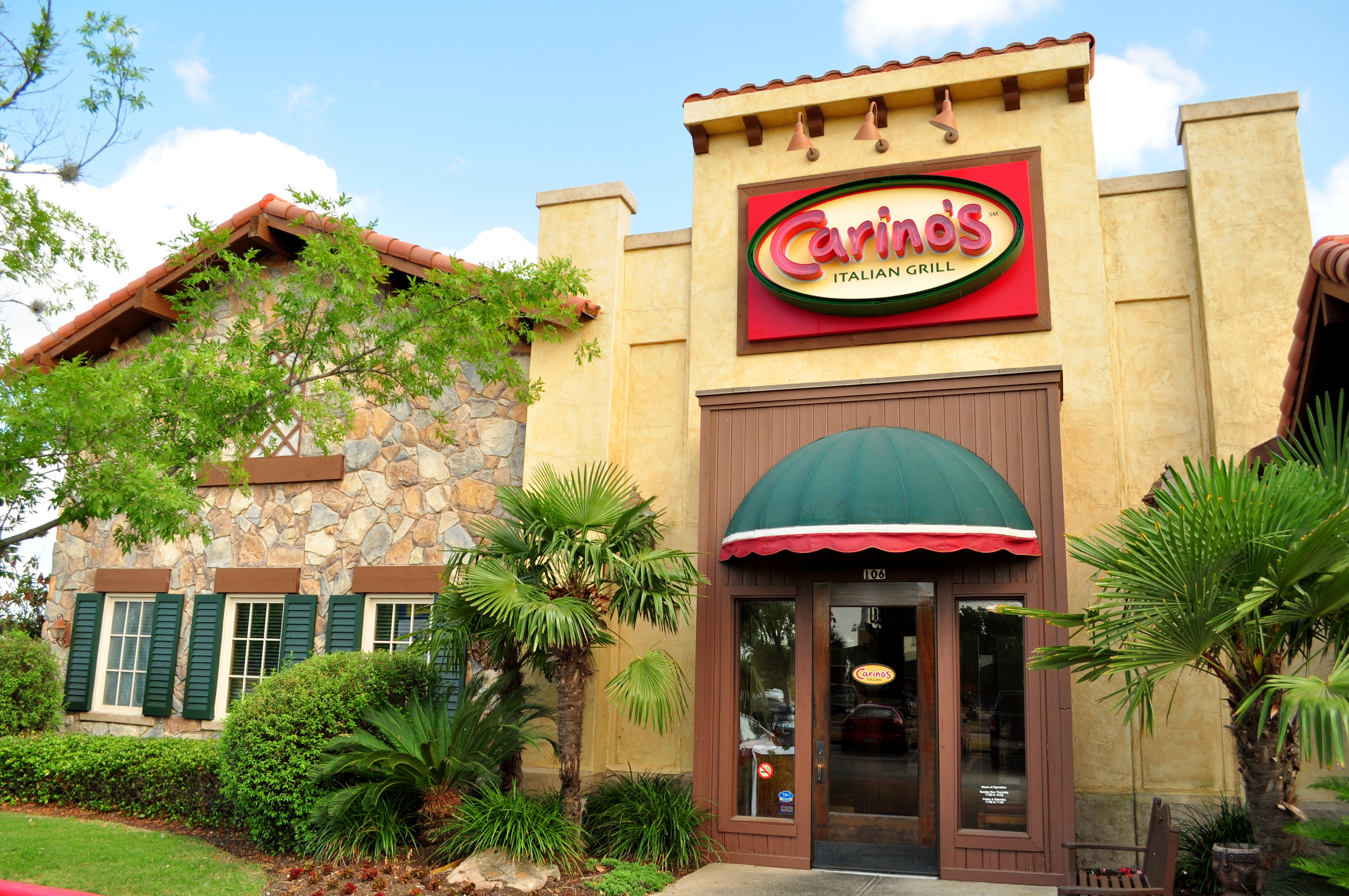
Carino's Italian in Lake Jackson, Texas

== History ==
Johnny Carino's was conceived by chef Johnny Carino, who in 1994 inherited a 15-unit Italian restaurant concept from Brinker International and was tasked with revamping the menu to reflect his own Italian heritage. The chain originated in Fort Collins, Colorado. By its peak in 2006, the chain was operating 173 company-owned and franchised locations across 30 U.S. states, and had also expanded internationally with locations in Bahrain, Egypt, Kuwait, and the United Arab Emirates.

== Bankruptcies and decline ==
Fired Up, Inc. filed for bankruptcy a second time in July 2016, citing a weak casual-dining environment, low oil prices, and higher-than-expected costs associated with the Affordable Care Act. At the time of the filing, the company owned 36 Carino's restaurants and franchised another 48. Between the 2014 and 2015 fiscal years, company revenue had declined from $110 million to $86 million.

The chain has continued to shrink since its second bankruptcy, with the company reporting fewer than 30 locations nationwide by 2025. Locations in Idaho, Louisiana, and Joplin, Missouri closed in 2025. As of 2025, Johnny Carino's is owned by Bluestone Hospitality Group, which also operates franchises of Popeyes and Burger King.
