= 2007 Pep Boys Auto 500 =

Race details
- Race 33 of 36 in the 2007 NASCAR Nextel Cup Series
- Layout of Atlanta Motor Speedway
- Date: October 28, 2007
- Official name: Pep Boys Auto 500
- Location: Atlanta Motor Speedway, Hampton, Georgia
- Course: Permanent racing facility
- Course length: 1.54 miles (2.48 km)
- Distance: 329 laps, 506.66 mi (815.39 km)
- Scheduled distance: 325 laps, 500.5 mi (805.476 km)
- Average speed: 135.26 miles per hour (217.68 km/h)

Pole position
Driver	Greg Biffle	Roush Fenway Racing
- Time: 28.807

Most laps led
Driver	Martin Truex Jr.	Dale Earnhardt, Inc.
- Laps: 135

Winner
No. 48	Jimmie Johnson	Hendrick Motorsports

Television in the United States
- Network: ABC
- Announcers: Jerry Punch, Rusty Wallace and Andy Petree

The 2007 Pep Boys Auto 500 was a stock car racing competition held on October 28, 2007, at Atlanta Motor Speedway in Hampton, Georgia. The race was the thirty-third race of the 2007 NASCAR Nextel Cup Series and the seventh of the season-ending ten-race Chase for the Nextel Cup.

To commemorate the fifteenth anniversary of the 1992 Hooters 500, the last race of the 1992 NASCAR Winston Cup Series, Jeff Gordon served as the Grand Marshal while Richard Petty served as the honorary flagman. Gordon had made his first career start in the 1992 race, which was also Petty's final race.

== Background ==
- Jeremy Mayfield replaced Jeff Green in the No. 66 Chevrolet for Haas CNC Racing.
- Mike Skinner replaced Mayfield in the No. 36 Toyota for Bill Davis Racing.
- Burney Lamar, in the No. 08 car, attempted to make his first career Nextel Cup Series start.

=== Qualifying ===
With a lap of 28.807 seconds at a speed of 192.453 mph, Greg Biffle won his first pole position of the year. Former teammate Kurt Busch started alongside him. Dale Jarrett, in his final fall Atlanta race, had a season best third place starting spot. Spring race winner Jimmie Johnson started sixth, while championship leader, Jeff Gordon, started in the eighth. Tony Stewart, the defending race winner started the race in thirteenth.

Failed to Qualify: No. 00–David Reutimann, No. 4–Ward Burton, No. 06–Sam Hornish Jr., No. 08–Burney Lamar, No. 36–Mike Skinner

=== Notes ===
1. 21-Bill Elliott was forced to use his third of six past champions provisional to make the field.
2. 22-Dave Blaney had a suspension failure during his qualifying lap and did not post a speed.

== Results ==
Pos.	Grid	Car No.	Driver	Team	Manufacturer	Laps	Laps Lead	Status
1	6	48	Jimmie Johnson	Hendrick Motorsports	Chevrolet	329	9	Running
2	16	99	Carl Edwards	Roush Fenway Racing	Ford	329	0	Running
3	32	41	Reed Sorenson	Chip Ganassi Racing	Dodge	329	0	Running
4	17	17	Matt Kenseth	Roush Fenway Racing	Ford	329	0	Running
5	28	31	Jeff Burton	Richard Childress Racing	Chevrolet	329	0	Running
6	26	07	Clint Bowyer	Richard Childress Racing	Chevrolet	329	0	Running
7	8	24	Jeff Gordon	Hendrick Motorsports	Chevrolet	329	0	Running
8	2	2	Kurt Busch	Penske Racing	Dodge	329	98	Running
9	4	9	Kasey Kahne	Gillett Evernham Motorsports	Dodge	329	3	Running
10	14	83	Brian Vickers	Team Red Bull	Toyota	329	0	Running
11	24	55	Michael Waltrip	Michael Waltrip Racing	Toyota	329	0	Running
12	15	25	Casey Mears	Hendrick Motorsports	Chevrolet	329	0	Running
13	39	45	Kyle Petty	Petty Enterprises	Dodge	329	1	Running
14	10	19	Elliott Sadler	Gillett Evernham Motorsports	Dodge	329	0	Running
15	34	29	Kevin Harvick	Richard Childress Racing	Chevrolet	329	1	Running
16	31	84	A.J. Allmendinger	Team Red Bull	Toyota	329	1	Running
17	38	88	Ricky Rudd	Yates Racing	Ford	329	0	Running
18	43	21	Bill Elliot	Wood Brothers Racing	Ford	329	0	Running
19	3	44	Dale Jarrett	Michael Waltrip Racing	Toyota	329	0	Running
20	19	5	Kyle Busch	Hendrick Motorsports	Chevrolet	329	77	Running
21	33	7	Robby Gordon	Robby Gordon Motorsports	Ford	328	0	Running
22	1	16	Greg Biffle	Roush Fenway Racing	Ford	328	1	Running
23	40	96	Tony Raines	Hall of Fame Racing	Chevrolet	328	0	Running
24	18	11	Denny Hamlin	Joe Gibbs Racing	Chevrolet	328	2	Running
25	5	8	Dale Earnhardt Jr.	Dale Earnhardt, Inc.	Chevrolet	327	0	Crash
26	25	26	Jamie McMurray	Roush Fenway Racing	Ford	327	0	Crash
27	36	15	Paul Menard	Dale Earnhardt, Inc.	Chevrolet	327	1	Running
28	29	49	John Andretti	BAM Racing	Dodge	327	0	Running
29	27	10	Scott Riggs	Evernham Motorsports	Dodge	327	0	Running
30	30	20	Tony Stewart	Joe Gibbs Racing	Chevrolet	323	0	Running
31	20	1	Martin Truex Jr.	Dale Earnhardt, Inc.	Chevrolet	322	135	Crash
32	35	70	Johnny Sauter	HAAS CNC Racing	Chevrolet	321	0	Running
33	37	6	David Ragan	Roush Fenway Racing	Chevrolet	320	0	Running
34	21	42	Juan Pablo Montoya	Chip Ganassi Racing	Dodge	283	0	Running
35	22	18	J.J. Yeley	Joe Gibbs Racing	Chevrolet	275	0	Running
36	23	78	Joe Nemecheck	Furniture Row Racing	Chevrolet	268	0	Crash
37	9	12	Ryan Newman	Penske Racing	Dodge	267	0	Engine
38	42	22	Dave Blaney	Bill Davis Racing	Toyota	263	0	Running
39	7	40	David Stremme	Chip Ganassi Racing	Dodge	250	0	Crash
40	41	66	Jeremy Mayfield	HAAS CNC Racing	Chevrolet	250	0	Running
41	11	43	Bobby Labonte	Petty Enterprises	Dodge	238	0	Running
42	13	38	David Gilliland	Yates Racing	Ford	64	0	Crash
43	12	01	Mark Martin	Dale Earnhardt, Inc	Chevrolet	64	0	Crash

== Post-race ==
- Jimmie Johnson's eighth victory of the 2007 season, combined with a seventh-place finish for Gordon, has compacted the points difference between the two down to nine points heading into Texas.
- In the battle for the first thirty-five positions in owners points, due to the suspension failure of the No. 22 car, the Wood Brothers/JTG Racing No. 21 gains points, but was still 82 points out.
- The top 2 finishers would be reversed in the next season's race, with Edwards winning and Johnson finishing second. Kenseth would also finish fourth yet again.

Previous race: 2007 Subway 500	Nextel Cup Series; 2007 season	Next race: 2007 Dickies 500
