= Brad Baker (racing driver) =

American racing driver

- Born: August 3, 1974 (age 52); Franklin, Tennessee, U.S.

NASCAR O'Reilly Auto Parts Series career
- 52 races run over 11 years
- 2010 position: 80th
- Best finish: 38th (2001)
- First race: 1999 NAPA Autocare 250 (Pikes Peak)
- Last race: 2010 CampingWorld.com 300 (Auto Club)
Wins	Top tens	Poles
0	0	0

Brad Baker (born August 3, 1974) is an American professional stock car racing driver. He has raced in the NASCAR Nationwide Series, making 52 starts with a best finish of thirteenth, coming at Nashville Superspeedway in 2001.

== Motorsports career results ==
=== NASCAR ===
(key) (Bold – Pole position awarded by qualifying time. Italics – Pole position earned by points standings or practice time. * – Most laps led.)

==== Nationwide Series ====
NASCAR Nationwide Series results
Year	Team	No.	Make	1	2	3	4	5	6	7	8	9	10	11	12	13	14	15	16	17	18	19	20	21	22	23	24	25	26	27	28	29	30	31	32	33	34	35	NNSC	Pts	Ref
1999	Ed Whitaker	7	Chevy	DAY	CAR	LVS	ATL	DAR	TEX	NSV; DNQ	BRI	TAL	CAL	NHA	RCH; DNQ	NZH	CLT	DOV	SBO	GLN	MLW	MYB	PPR; 35	GTY	IRP; DNQ	MCH	BRI	DAR	RCH	DOV	CLT	CAR	MEM; DNQ	PHO	HOM				126th	58	
2000	Baker Racing	13	Chevy	DAY	CAR	LVS	ATL	DAR	BRI	TEX	NSV; DNQ	TAL	CAL	RCH	NHA	CLT	DOV	SBO	MYB	GLN	MLW; DNQ	NZH	PPR; 39	GTY	IRP; DNQ	MCH	BRI	DAR	RCH	DOV	CLT	CAR	MEM; 30	PHO	HOM				93rd	110	
2001	Baker Racing	28	Chevy	DAY; 35	CAR; 34	LVS; 35	ATL; 23	DAR; Wth	BRI; 28	TEX	NSH; 13	TAL; 20	CAL	RCH; 25	NHA	NZH	CLT; 36	DOV	KEN; 18	MLW; 27	GLN	CHI	GTY	PPR; 26	IRP; 37	MCH	BRI; 23	DAR	RCH; 43	DOV	KAN	CLT	MEM; 23	PHO	CAR	HOM			38th	1270	
2002	Baker Racing	28	Chevy	DAY	CAR	LVS	DAR	BRI; 41	TEX	NSH; 17	TAL	CAL	RCH	NHA	NZH	CLT	DOV	NSH; 23									BRI; 23	DAR	RCH	DOV	KAN	CLT; DNQ	MEM; 17	ATL	CAR; Wth	PHO	HOM		59th	452	
2002	ORTEC Racing	96	Chevy																KEN; DNQ	MLW	DAY	CHI	GTY	PPR	IRP	MCH													59th	452	
2003	Baker Racing	28	Dodge	DAY; 41						TAL; 30			RCH; DNQ	GTY	NZH		DOV; 19	NSH; 15	KEN	MLW	DAY; 36	CHI	NHA	PPR	IRP	MCH	BRI; 42	DAR	RCH	DOV	KAN	CLT; 29	MEM	ATL	PHO	CAR	HOM		59th	639	
2003	ORTEC Racing	96	Chevy		CAR; 24	LVS	DAR	BRI	TEX																														59th	639	
2003	Baker Racing	28	Chevy								NSH; 41	CAL																											59th	639	
2003	Jay Robinson Racing	39	Dodge													CLT; DNQ																							59th	639	
2004	Premier Motorsports	85	Chevy	DAY	CAR	LVS	DAR	BRI	TEX	NSH; DNQ	TAL	CAL	GTY	RCH	NZH	CLT	DOV	NSH	KEN	MLW	DAY	CHI	NHA	PPR	IRP	MCH	BRI	CAL	RCH	DOV	KAN	CLT	MEM	ATL	PHO	DAR	HOM		N/A	0	
2006	MacDonald Motorsports	72	Chevy	DAY	CAL	MXC	LVS	ATL	BRI	TEX	NSH	PHO	TAL	RCH	DAR	CLT	DOV	NSH	KEN	MLW	DAY	CHI	NHA	MAR	GTY	IRP	GLN	MCH	BRI	CAL	RCH	DOV	KAN	CLT; 30	MEM	TEX	PHO	HOM	126th	73	
2007	Baker Curb Racing	37	Ford	DAY	CAL	MXC	LVS	ATL	BRI	NSH	TEX	PHO	TAL	RCH	DAR	CLT	DOV	NSH	KEN	MLW	NHA	DAY	CHI	GTY	IRP	CGV	GLN	MCH	BRI	CAL	RCH	DOV	KAN	CLT; 28					108th	198	
2007	Baker Curb Racing	27	Ford																																MEM; 34	TEX; 35	PHO	HOM	108th	198	
2008	Baker Curb Racing	37	Ford	DAY; 28	CAL; 39	LVS; 35	ATL	BRI; 27	NSH; 28	TEX	PHO	MXC	TAL	RCH	DAR							DAY; 27	CHI	GTY; DNQ	IRP	CGV	GLN	MCH	BRI	CAL	RCH	DOV	KAN	CLT	MEM	TEX	PHO	HOM	64th	508	
2008	MacDonald Motorsports	81	Dodge													CLT; 27	DOV	NSH	KEN	MLW	NHA																		64th	508	
2009	Day Enterprise Racing	85	Ford	DAY	CAL	LVS	BRI	TEX	NSH	PHO	TAL	RCH	DAR	CLT	DOV	NSH; 41																							136th	83	
2009	Day Enterprise Racing	05	Ford														KEN; 40	MLW	NHA	DAY	CHI	GTY	IRP	IOW	GLN; DNQ	MCH	BRI	CGV	ATL	RCH	DOV	KAN	CAL	CLT	MEM	TEX	PHO	HOM	136th	83	
2010	Baker Curb Racing	43	Ford	DAY	CAL	LVS	BRI	NSH	PHO	TEX	TAL	RCH	DAR	DOV	CLT	NSH	KEN	ROA	NHA; 36	DAY	CHI; 34	GTY; 33	IRP	IOW; 39	GLN	MCH	BRI	CGV											80th	372	
2010	Baker Curb Racing	27	Ford																										ATL; 26	RCH	DOV	KAN	CAL; 34	CLT	GTY	TEX	PHO	HOM	80th	372	

=== ARCA Re/Max Series ===
(key) (Bold – Pole position awarded by qualifying time. Italics – Pole position earned by points standings or practice time. * – Most laps led.)

ARCA Re/Max Series results
Year	Team	No.	Make	1	2	3	4	5	6	7	8	9	10	11	12	13	14	15	16	17	18	19	20	21	22	23	24	25	ARMC	Pts	Ref
2000	Wayne Peterson Racing	6	Pontiac	DAY	SLM	AND	CLT	KIL	FRS	MCH	POC	TOL	KEN	BLN	POC	WIN	ISF	KEN	DSF	SLM	CLT	TAL; 30	ATL						129th	80	
2001	Peterson-Smith Motorsports	6	Chevy	DAY; 12	NSH	WIN	SLM	GTY	KEN	CLT	KAN	MCH	POC	MEM	GLN	KEN	MCH	POC	NSH	ISF	CHI	DSF	SLM	TOL	BLN	CLT	TAL	ATL	132nd	170	
2008	Baker Curb Racing	47	Ford	DAY; 9	SLM	IOW	KEN	CAR	KEN	TOL	POC	MCH	CAY	KEN	BLN	POC	NSH	ISF	DSF	CHI	SLM	NJE	TAL	TOL					100th	185	
