= NASCAR Nationwide Series at Memphis Motorsports Park =

Former NASCAR stock car race in Memphis, Tennessee

Kroger On Track for the Cure 250

NASCAR Nationwide Series
- Venue: Memphis Motorsports Park
- Location: Millington, Tennessee
- Corporate sponsor: Kroger and Dodge
- First race: 1999
- Last race: 2009
- Distance: 187.5 miles (301.8 km)
- Laps: 250
- Previous names: Sam's Town 250 (1999–2001, 2006–2007); Sam's Town 250 Benefitting St. Jude (2002–2003); Sam's Town 250 Benefiting St. Jude Childrens Hospital (2004-2005); Kroger On Track For The Cure 250 (2008–2009)

Stock car races in the NASCAR Nationwide Series were held at Memphis Motorsports Park in Memphis, Tennessee from 1999 to 2009. The 2007 race had twenty-five caution periods, ten more than any other Nationwide Series race that has been held at MMP. The race ended under a green-white-checker finish every year from 2004, when the rule was first implemented in the series, to 2009, the final race at the track.

In 2001, the race was scheduled to be shown on tape delay on TNT. The Busch Series race was postponed due to rain to Sunday, the same day as the Winston Cup event in Martinsville. However, the same storm delayed the Martinsville race, so the Busch Series race was aired live on NBC.

On October 24, 2009, Brad Keselowski won the race at MMP by holding off Kyle Busch to the finish line on the 11th and final annual racing event at MMP, as Dover Motorsports, Inc. announced the closure of Memphis Motorsports Park, a week after that race.

== Past winners ==
Year	Date	Driver	Team	Manufacturer	Race Distance		Race Time	Average Speed (mph)	Report	Ref
Year	Date	Driver	Team	Manufacturer	Laps	Miles (km)	Race Time	Average Speed (mph)	Report	Ref
1999	October 31	Jeff Green	Progressive Motorsports	Chevrolet	250	187.5 (301.752)	2:26:54	76.583	Report	
2000	October 29	Kevin Harvick	Richard Childress Racing	Chevrolet	250	187.5 (301.752)	2:01:49	92.352	Report	
2001	October 14*	Randy LaJoie	Evans Motorsports	Chevrolet	250	187.5 (301.752)	2:29:54	75.05	Report	
2002	October 20*	Scott Wimmer	Bill Davis Racing	Pontiac	250	187.5 (301.752)	2:21:48	79.337	Report	
2003	October 18	Bobby Hamilton Jr.	Team Rensi Motorsports	Ford	250	187.5 (301.752)	2:08:19	87.674	Report	
2004	October 23	Martin Truex Jr.	Chance 2 Motorsports	Chevrolet	255*	191.25 (307.787)	2:26:04	78.561	Report	
2005	October 22	Clint Bowyer	Richard Childress Racing	Chevrolet	254*	190.5 (306.58)	2:35:34	73.473	Report	
2006	October 28	Kevin Harvick	Richard Childress Racing	Chevrolet	252*	189 (304.166)	2:32:33	74.336	Report	
2007	October 27	David Reutimann	Michael Waltrip Racing	Toyota	253*	189.75 (305.373)	3:02:12	62.487	Report	
2008	October 25	Carl Edwards	Roush Fenway Racing	Ford	253*	189.75 (305.373)	2:08:14	88.783	Report	
2009	October 24	Brad Keselowski	JR Motorsports	Chevrolet	254*	190.5 (306.58)	2:33:41	74.374	Report	

- 2001–2002: Race postponed from Saturday to Sunday due to rain.
- 2004–2009: Race extended due to a green–white–checker finish.
