= Tyler Walker (racing driver) =

American racing driver (born 1979)

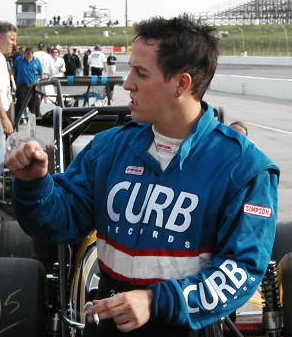
- Walker in 2003
- Born: Timothy Tyler Andrew Walker; July 16, 1979 (age 47); Los Angeles, California, U.S.
- Awards: 1992–1996 California State Go-Kart Champion 1996 Knoxville Nationals Rookie of the Year 1997 All-Star Circuit of Champions Rookie of the Year 2002 World of Outlaws Gumout Series Champion 2004 USAC Silver Crown Series Most Improved Driver

NASCAR O'Reilly Auto Parts Series career
- 19 races run over 2 years
- First race: 2004 Goulds Pumps/ITT Industries 250 (Pikes Peak)
- Last race: 2005 Zippo 200 (Watkins Glen)
Wins	Top tens	Poles
0	0	0

NASCAR FedEx Freight Truck Series career
- 9 races run over 5 years
- First race: 2003 Virginia Is For Lovers 200 (Richmond)
- Last race: 2007 Quaker Steak and Lube 200 (Charlotte)
Wins	Top tens	Poles
0	1	0
- Statistics up to date as of April 1, 2007.

Timothy Tyler Andrew Walker (born July 15, 1979) is an American professional stock car racing driver. Walker is one of many racers who have competed in many inter-disciplinary automotive ranks. His automotive career includes cycling competition, open-wheeled sprint cars, as well as being a stock car pilot, formerly competing in NASCAR. He is the first fourth-generation driver to compete in NASCAR since the late Adam Petty.

== Racing career ==
=== Early career ===
Walker began his racing career in two-wheeled vehicles. He started competing bicycles at the age of six and upgraded to motorcycles at the age of eight years. He then upgraded to go-karts and won four California state karting championships and had a total of 200 wins. When he turned sixteen years old, an age where many of his peers were first learning to drive, Walker began his Sprint Car racing career. His first competitive foray was in the All-Star Circuit of Champions series. He was victorious in seven races throughout the season. In 1996, young Walker made his stock car debut in the ASA AC-Delco Challenge Series at Indianapolis Raceway Park. He timed in 33rd in the field during time trials and finished twenty-seventh after his engine expired ninety-five laps into the racing session. Before long, he was invited to partake in the prestigious World of Outlaws competition and won several main feature events over the next two seasons. He also won Rookie of the Year honors in 1996 at the famous Knoxville Nationals. He would join the All-Star Circuit of Champions in 1997, winning seven races and claiming Rookie of the Year honors in his first full season of sprint car competition. The next calendar year, he swept all the main feature events in the World of Outlaws' Western World Championships at the famed Manzanita Speedway. He would follow up with a win at Tri-Main Speedway in 1999, the last year of the millennium.

During this time, Walker would later be invited to make his first full-time attempt at full-fender stock car racing. He had signed with Tyler Jet Motorsports, owned by Tyler, Texas native, Tim Beverly, to compete in the NASCAR Busch Series in the year of 2000. To prepare for this, he made a start in the grueling ARCA Bondo/MarHyde Series driving for Beverly. His No. 15 1999 Pontiac Grand Prix qualified and finished twenty-eighth, three laps off of the pace at the EasyCare Vehicle Service Contracts 150 at Lowe's Motor Speedway. Unfortunately for Walker, the necessary sponsorship needed to finance a competitive entry did not materialize for the 2000 season, so his deal with Tyler Jet was cancelled. He made one attempt at the BellSouth Mobility 320, driving the No. 28 Larry Lockamy entry, but his qualifying speed was too slow to make the competitive 43-car field.

=== Sprint cars and return to stock cars (2001–2005) ===
With his stock car dreams on hold, Walker returned to the familiar sprint car circuit. In addition to dirt sprints, Walker competed in the United States Auto Club sprint series, finishing ninth at the 2001 J.D. Byrider 100, where he competed against future and present NASCAR superstars Kasey Kahne, Tony Stewart, and Mike Bliss. Walker returned to full-time competition in 2002, moving to the state of Oklahoma to live close to his new team, which was owned by one of his former crew chiefs. He and the new team won a total of sixteen races during the season earning him the name of World of Outlaws Gumout Series championship. He would become famous for celebrating his many victories by doing a backflip off of the top of his racecar. This novel celebration would soon be copied by Carl Edwards, who was joining the NASCAR ranks at this time. Walker finally made a successful qualification in a NASCAR-sanctioned event during the 2003 season, the year after he won the championship. He debuted in the Craftsman Truck Series, a racing series for stock model pickup trucks, in 2003, racing three races in the No. 7 Mopar Performance Dodge Ram for Ultra Motorsports as a teammate to championship contender and eventual 2005 Series champion Ted Musgrave. His best finish during these races was a 21st at Las Vegas Motor Speedway.

Walker spent time in 2003 driving in the USAC Silver Crown series for RE Technologies/Curb-Agajanian. He finished fifth in points for the year earning the title of Most Improved Driver in the series. In 2004, Walker split time as a full-time open-wheel sprint racer and a stock car racer. He joined the USAC Silver Crown Series for Kasey Kahne Racing owned by NASCAR driver and that year's Nextel Cup Rookie of the Year and future Allstate Insurance spokesmodel Kasey Kahne. His lone victory that season came in a Silver Crown race at Nazareth Speedway. Walker would slowly begin to transition to the Busch Series by first mastering the time trials segment of the race weekend. To prepare for this, he qualified the No. 38 Great Clips Dodge entry owned by Akins Motorsports, and driven by his USAC boss and now dear friend Kasey Kahne, on two separate occasions, first at Nashville Superspeedway, and again at Kentucky Speedway, both events coming within seven days of each other. To further study for his major-league stock passenger car debut, he competed in another ASA race at Madison International Speedway. Walker started the No. 70 Terry Kunes Chevrolet twenty-eighth, passed a net total of twenty cars, and finished eighth at the conclusion of the event, completing all 250 laps. Now fully prepared for the rigors involved in NASCAR racing, Walker made his NASCAR Busch Series debut at Pikes Peak International Raceway, near the famous Pikes Peak in Colorado. He posted an eighth place qualification effort in the No. 38 Great Clips/Akins Dodge but fell to 27th by the end of the racing session and was fifty laps off the pace. He chose to attempt his next race with BACE Motorsports, which fielded the No. 74 Outdoor Channel Chevrolet Monte Carlo and had won three consecutive Busch Series championships in the mid-1990s, when young Walker was but a teenager. In this race, he posted 35th during time trials but did pass five cars to finish 30th in the final running order of the race. In his final stock car start of the season at Memphis Motorsports Park, Walker returned to the Great Clips team. He failed to qualify for the main feature on speed and was forced to take a provisional starting spot. He methodically and smoothly moved through the racing field to come home in twelfth position, his best finish to that point in NASCAR stock cars.

=== Last years in stock cars and continuation in sprints (2005–2007) ===
In 2005, Walker signed a contract to drive the No. 38 Great Clips entry for Akins, again splitting time with longtime friend and former boss Kasey Kahne. Teamed with crew chief Jon Wolfe, Walker would compete in a total of fifteen races for the operation along with competing part-time for Rookie of the Year honors in the NASCAR Busch Series. He made an additional start for the Jay Robinson Racing team, driving the No. 28 Deka Batteries Ford Taurus at Dover International Speedway (formerly known as "Dover Downs International Speedway") and finishing 43rd, last in the field after crashing on lap 27 on the front straightaway. With Akins Motorsports, Walker's best finish came at the Carquest Auto Parts 300 at Lowe's Motor Speedway. He qualified tenth and finished fourteenth. He also had identical runs at Kentucky Speedway and New Hampshire International Speedway, where he started ninth and finished nineteenth and completed a minimum of 199 laps in both races. Ultimately, Walker's tenure at the Akins team would be cut short after the Zippo 200 at the famed Watkins Glen International road course in the Finger Lakes region of New York State (not the city). During the race, he became entangled with NASCAR Busch East Series champion Matt Kobyluck and crashed in Turn 4. After this incident, Walker was laid off and relieved of his driving duties with the team. Because Kahne could still not run every race, Walker's replacements would be Mike Wallace and later A. J. Foyt IV, grandson of A. J. Foyt a former four-time Indianapolis 500 winner, who would briefly take on the No. 38 team full-time in 2006 before being released. Walker spent the remainder of 2005 competing part-time in the USAC Silver Crown Series, driving Kahne's No. 19 entry. His favorite race was the Ted Horn 100 at DuQuoin State Fairgrounds, where he won the pole (starting first) and finished in the third position.

Walker's 2006 racing season began in stock cars once again. This time, he attempted another ARCA Stock Car race at Nashville Superspeedway, driving for Vision Racing (not to be confuse with Vision Racing, a separate entity that competed in the Indy Racing League). Unfortunately for Walker, his No. 37 2005 Chevrolet Monte Carlo was not fast enough to break into the starting field, and the team was issued a DNQ for the event. Walker spent the remainder of 2006 returning to the World of Outlaws Sprint Car series, driving the No. 5 Forbrook Motorsports entry. His best finish in the regular series was a third that occurred at Huset's Speedway in Brandon, South Dakota. In five All-Star Series events, he had two second-place finishes, both coming at Red River Valley Speedway, where he also had a pole position. In addition to these events, Walker competed in a National Sprint Tour event at the Missouri State Fairgrounds, where he started twelfth and finished seventeenth. He also attempted a 410 Sprint Car competition at the Knoxville Nationals, where he failed to qualify.

In 2007, Walker returned once again to NASCAR competition. This time, he re-joined the Craftsman Truck Series and was slated to drive the No. 36 360 OTC Toyota Tundra for Bill Davis Racing full-time. His truck was painted in a matter similar to Nextel Cup teammate Jeremy Mayfield, who also carried 360 OTC sponsorship. Incidentally 360 OTC was a prior title sponsor of the World of Outlaws where Walker had toiled for so many years. In addition, the World Wrestling Entertainment and the rock band Kiss served as associate sponsors to complement the entertainment package sponsorship. Walker had three top-six qualification efforts, including a career best second-place start Kansas Speedway. His best finish came at the tricky and legendary Martinsville Speedway, where he finished in the ninth position, his only career top-ten finish in NASCAR competition. After six races, it was announced that Ryan Mathews would drive part-time sharing the ride with him. Walker was suspended indefinitely by NASCAR on May 18, 2007, for violation of the substance abuse policy, and has not competed in NASCAR since.

=== Recovery and relapse (2007–2012) ===
Following his abrupt suspension from NASCAR, Walker spent the next several months out of racing. He returned to competition in the USAC Series at the famed Copper World Classic at Phoenix International Raceway, finishing eighteenth in the final overall running order. He attempted several races in 2008 in the World of Outlaws Series in the No. 24T entry, but failed to qualify for many of them, and only getting one top-ten finish, a ninth-place finish, at Manzanita Speedway. Walker did achieve victory in a heat race in the Mini Gold Cup at the Silver Dollar Speedway. He also ran a USAC race for RFMS at Terre Haute Action Track and finished 19th. Walker made limited appearances in the USAC Silver Crown series in 2009 with the No. 23 Vance Racing team. His ultimate result was a fifth that came on July 23 at Indianapolis Raceway Park.

Walker was contracted to drive the historic Mike Heffner owned No. 27 entry in Pennsylvania to start the 2010 season in various sprint car series. After decent finishes, he left the Heffner car, and was hired by Keen Motorsports to race the No. 17 Peterbilt sponsored car in 2011, primarily concentrating in 410 Sprints. By switching rides, Walker traveled out of Pennsylvania to follow the World of Outlaws on occasion. Walker was victorious in two 410 Sprint events at Port Royal Speedway and Grandview Speedway. On July 16, 2011, Walker won the famed Kings Royal race in the World of Outlaws at Eldora Speedway (owned by Tony Stewart) in Rossburg, Ohio, taking home $50,000 for the win. Walker left the Keen team in August 2011 while competing at the Knoxville Nationals in Knoxville, Iowa. It is reported that he left the Nationals and the team due to an inner ear issue which was causing him to experience vertigo and he felt that he was unsafe to drive a race car. He went back to California to recover but never did rejoin the Keen Motorsports Team. The Keen Motorsports Team had since hired driver Brian Leppo of Pennsylvania.

At the beginning of the 2012 season, Walker returned to 410 Sprints, this time driving the PA based, Charlie and Dawn Sorokach owned No. 35 machine. On July 5, 2012, Walker was involved in an altercation at the Williams Grove Speedway in Pennsylvania following an on-track incident during a qualifying race. After breaking a track-specific rule involving going low (in his case, to avoid a wreck), Walker stormed through the pit row to the officials' stand to yell at officials for the ruling, cursing and gesturing towards officials and fans along the way. The altercation escalated to a fight in Walker's pit (though not directly involving Walker) between security and one of Walker's crew members. For his outburst, the dreadlocked Walker was suspended for the race. He would go on to win the next race he competed at Port Royal Speedway. He took the Sorokach #35 sprint car to World of Outlaws competition, where his best finishes were fourteenth at Knoxville and in a cruel taste of irony, Williams Grove. In 2013, he went midget racing for Josh Ford in the No. 73 car, with sponsorship dollars from the generous donations of Spike Chassis and Bob Wirth Chevrolet. He attempted two events at Tulsa Expo Raceway, but was charged with a DNF for both events as he had failed to qualify.

== Arrest ==
On January 30, 2013, Walker was arrested in Utah after a high-speed chase on Interstate 15 through Nevada and Arizona; he was charged with multiple drug and alcohol violations. The high-speed chase traveled through three states, Utah, Arizona, and Nevada before he was captured. He was found with an open container, unlawfully possessed alcohol, and various drug paraphernalia.

Walker pleaded guilty to multiple charges in a Utah court in December 2014.

== Motorsports career results ==
=== NASCAR ===
(key) (Bold – Pole position awarded by qualifying time. Italics – Pole position earned by points standings or practice time. * – Most laps led.)

==== Busch Series ====
NASCAR Busch Series results
Year	Team	No.	Make	1	2	3	4	5	6	7	8	9	10	11	12	13	14	15	16	17	18	19	20	21	22	23	24	25	26	27	28	29	30	31	32	33	34	35	NBSC	Pts	Ref
2000	Lockamy Racing	28	Chevy	DAY	CAR	LVS	ATL	DAR	BRI	TEX	NSV; DNQ	TAL	CAL	RCH	NHA	CLT	DOV	SBO	MYB	GLN	MLW	NZH	PPR	GTY	IRP	MCH	BRI	DAR	RCH	DOV	CLT	CAR	MEM	PHO	HOM				NA	–	
2004	Akins Motorsports	38	Dodge	DAY	CAR	LVS	DAR	BRI	TEX	NSH	TAL	CAL	GTY	RCH	NZH	CLT	DOV	NSH; QL^{†}	KEN; QL^{†}	MLW	DAY	CHI	NHA	PPR; 27									MEM; 12	ATL	PHO	DAR	HOM		80th	282	
2004	BACE Motorsports	74	Chevy																						IRP; 30	MCH	BRI	CAL	RCH	DOV	KAN	CLT							80th	282	
2005	Akins Motorsports	38	Dodge	DAY	CAL; 39	MXC; 24	LVS	ATL	NSH; 17	BRI; 35	TEX	PHO; 42	TAL	DAR	RCH; 28	CLT; 14		NSH; 19	KEN; 19	MLW; 40	DAY	CHI	NHA; 19	PPR; 23	GTY; 17	IRP; 37	GLN; 36	MCH	BRI	CAL	RCH	DOV	KAN	CLT	MEM	TEX	PHO	HOM	41st	1252	
2005	Jay Robinson Racing	28	Ford														DOV; 43																						41st	1252	
^{†} – Qualified for Kasey Kahne

==== Craftsman Truck Series ====
NASCAR Craftsman Truck Series results
Year	Team	No.	Make	1	2	3	4	5	6	7	8	9	10	11	12	13	14	15	16	17	18	19	20	21	22	23	24	25	NCTC	Pts	Ref
2003	Ultra Motorsports	7	Dodge	DAY	DAR	MMR	MAR	CLT	DOV	TEX	MEM	MLW	KAN	KEN	GTW	MCH	IRP	NSH	BRI	RCH; 27	NHA	CAL	LVS; 21	SBO	TEX	MAR	PHO	HOM; 23	71st	276	
2007	Bill Davis Racing	36	Toyota	DAY; 31	CAL; 24	ATL; 31	MAR; 8	KAN; 23	CLT; 15	MFD	DOV	TEX	MCH	MLW	MEM	KEN	IRP	NSH	BRI	GTW	NHA	LVS	TAL	MAR	ATL	TEX	PHO	HOM	43rd	585	

=== ARCA Re/Max Series ===
(key) (Bold – Pole position awarded by qualifying time. Italics – Pole position earned by points standings or practice time. * – Most laps led.)

ARCA Re/Max Series results
Year	Team	No.	Make	1	2	3	4	5	6	7	8	9	10	11	12	13	14	15	16	17	18	19	20	21	22	23	ARMC	Pts	Ref
1999	Tyler Jet Motorsports	15	Pontiac	DAY	ATL	SLM	AND	CLT	MCH	POC	TOL	SBS	BLN	POC	KIL	FRS	FLM	ISF	WIN	DSF	SLM	CLT; 28	TAL	ATL			130th	90	
2006	Vision Racing	37	Chevy	DAY	NSH; DNQ	SLM	WIN	KEN	TOL	POC	MCH	KAN	KEN	BLN	POC	GTW	NSH	MCH	ISF	MIL	TOL	DSF	CHI	SLM	TAL	IOW	NA	–	
