= Akins Motorsports =

Former NASCAR team

- Owner(s): Brad Akins; Bob Sutton; Doug Stringer
- Base: Mooresville, North Carolina; Concord, North Carolina
- Series: Busch Series; Craftsman Truck Series
- Race drivers: Kasey Kahne, Mark Green, A. J. Foyt IV, Tyler Walker, Elton Sawyer, Christian Elder, Bobby Hamilton
- Manufacturer: Ford, Dodge
- Opened: 1992
- Closed: 2006 (merged with Braun Racing)

Career
- Race victories: 3

Akins Motorsports, formerly Akins-Sutton Motorsports was a NASCAR team based in Mooresville, North Carolina, which is near Charlotte. The team was formed in 1992 by Brad Akins, owner of several car dealerships in Georgia and team pit crew member, and Bob Sutton who served as the team's financial manager. At the time the team was sold to Braun Racing in 2006, it was owned by longtime team general manager Doug Stringer. The team was known for its Great Clips-sponsored #38 car in the Busch Series (now the O'Reilly Auto Parts Series), which was later fielded by Braun Racing and Turner Scott Motorsports.

== Busch Series ==
=== Car #38 history ===
Akins Motorsports debuted in 1993, running the #38 Country Time Ford Thunderbird driven by Bobby Hamilton. They ran two Winston Cup races with Hamilton driving, posting a tenth-place finish at Dover International Speedway. They also ran a pair of Busch Races with Elton Sawyer driving, his best finish a 25th at Richmond International Raceway.

Sawyer went full-time with the team in 1994 with sponsorship from Ford Credit. They had six top-tens, as well as winning at Myrtle Beach Speedway, finishing fourteenth in championship points. The following season, they moved to ninth in points and Sawyer won the pole at Indianapolis Raceway Park. At the end of the year, Sawyer was replaced with Dennis Setzer with Lipton Tea sponsorship for 1996. He had two top-tens, before Sawyer came back to the team to finish out the year, posting one top-ten.

In 1997, Barbasol became primary sponsor, and Sawyer finished a then-career-best sixth in points, before moving up to fifth the following season.

Glenn Allen Jr. took over the #38 for the 1999 season, and had a fourth-place finish at The Milwaukee Mile, but was replaced during the season by Hut Stricklin, who ended the season with a pole at Homestead-Miami Speedway. The 38 team was forced to shut down at the end of the season due to sponsor Barbasol departing.

Rookie Christian Elder drove the #38 in 2001 with Great Clips/Deka Batteries sponsorship for sixteen races that year, posting a best finish of 20th twice. Elder drove the 38 for eight races in 2002, sharing the ride with Mark Green before Green took over the ride permanently, posting three top-fifteen finishes.

In 2003, Akins hired Ford development driver Kasey Kahne as the team's driver. Kahne finished seventh in points and won his first career race at the Ford 300. He would take over the 9 Dodge in the Winston Cup Series for Evernham Motorsports' for the 2004 season, but continued to run Akins' Busch team, as they switched to Dodge Intrepids. He went winless in 2004, but had two poles and finished eleventh in points.

In 2005, team manager Doug Stringer assumed full ownership, and Kahne shared the car with Tyler Walker. He had two wins and three poles, while Walker did not finish better than 14th, and was released in August 2005. Mike Wallace and A. J. Foyt IV shared the driving duties with Kahne for the balance of the season.

Foyt IV was to compete for Rookie of the Year in the #38 Akins ride in 2006 but was released from the team when Doug Stringer merged Akins Motorsports with Braun Racing.

==== Car No. 38 results ====
Year	Driver	No.	Make	1	2	3	4	5	6	7	8	9	10	11	12	13	14	15	16	17	18	19	20	21	22	23	24	25	26	27	28	29	30	31	32	33	34	35	NBSC	Pts
1993	Bobby Hamilton	38	Ford	DAY	CAR	RCH	DAR	BRI	HCY; 23	ROU	MAR; 31	NZH	CLT	DOV	MYB	GLN	MLW	TAL	IRP; 9	MCH	NHA	BRI	DAR																	
1993	Elton Sawyer	38	Ford																					RCH; 25	DOV	ROU	CLT; 36	MAR	CAR	HCY	ATL									
1994	Elton Sawyer	38	Ford	DAY; 20	CAR; 12	RCH; 4	ATL; DNQ	MAR; 22	DAR; 13	HCY; 28	BRI	ROU; 31	NHA; DNQ	NZH; 2	CLT; 21	DOV; 13	MYB; 1	GLN; 35	MLW; 8	SBO; 17	TAL; 21	HCY; 14	IRP; 22	MCH; 20	BRI; 15	DAR; 9	RCH; 31	DOV; 13	CLT; 5	MAR; 19	CAR; 39									
1995	Elton Sawyer	38	Ford	DAY; 39	CAR; 32	RCH; 15	ATL; 10	NSV; 30	DAR; 38	BRI; 18	HCY; 26	NHA; 2	NZH; 8	CLT; 27	DOV; 12	MYB; 10	GLN; 22	MLW; 14	TAL; 10	SBO; 7	IRP; 2	MCH; 13	BRI; 26	DAR; 8	RCH; 10	DOV; 17	CLT; 20	CAR; 14	HOM; 12											
1996	Dennis Setzer	38	Ford	DAY; 27	CAR; 31	RCH; 22	ATL; DNQ	NSV; 37	DAR; 36	BRI; DNQ	HCY; DNQ	NZH; 20	CLT; DNQ	DOV; 33	SBO; 11	MYB; 8	GLN; 11	MLW; 24	NHA; 24	TAL; DNQ	IRP; 6																			
1996	Elton Sawyer	38	Ford																			MCH; 25	BRI; 12	DAR; 16	RCH; 22	DOV; 8	CLT; 19	CAR; 14	HOM; 15											
1997	Elton Sawyer	38	Ford	DAY; 16	CAR; 12	RCH; 11	ATL; 2	LVS; 31	DAR; 17	HCY; 6	TEX; 11	BRI; 32	NSV; 17	TAL; 42	NHA; 4	NZH; 23	CLT; 43	DOV; 9	SBO; 5	GLN; 19	MLW; 6	MYB; 5	GTY; 4	IRP; 3	MCH; 16	BRI; 34	DAR; 13	RCH; 31	DOV; 16	CLT; 22	CAL; 19	CAR; 12	HOM; 32						8th	3419
1998	Elton Sawyer	38	Ford	DAY; 28	CAR; 14	LVS; 30	NSV; 10	DAR; 11	BRI; 4	TEX; 27	HCY; 27	TAL; 10	NHA; 27	NZH; 36	CLT; 8	DOV; 8	RCH; 18	PPR; 4	GLN; 11	MLW; 2	MYB; 11	CAL; 12	SBO; 25	IRP; 8	MCH; 8	BRI; 18	DAR; 12	RCH; 33	DOV; 3	CLT; 13	GTY; 38	CAR; 32	ATL; 13	HOM; 26					5th	3533
1999	Glenn Allen Jr.	38	Ford	DAY; 16	CAR; DNQ	LVS; DNQ	ATL; 9	DAR; 30	TEX; 27	NSV; 29	BRI; 26		CAL; 21	NHA; 28	RCH; 26	NZH; 14	CLT; DNQ	DOV; 24	SBO; DNQ	GLN; 29	MLW; 4	MYB; DNQ	PPR; 37	GTY; 33	IRP; 24	MCH; DNQ	BRI; DNQ												26th	2358
1999	Glenn Allen Jr.	38	Chevy									TAL; 13																											26th	2358
1999	Hut Stricklin	38	Ford																									DAR; 22	RCH; DNQ	DOV; 16	CLT; 21	CAR; DNQ	MEM; 42	PHO; 29	HOM; 21				26th	2358
2001	Christian Elder	38	Ford	DAY; DNQ	CAR	LVS; 23	ATL; 26	DAR	BRI; 20	TEX	NSH	TAL; 26	CAL; 24	RCH	NHA	NZH; 28	CLT; 37	DOV; 20	KEN; 24	MLW	GLN	CHI; 29	GTY; 30	PPR	IRP	MCH	BRI; 35	DAR	RCH	DOV	KAN; 27	CLT; 40	MEM	PHO; 28	CAR	HOM; 43			41st	1259
2002	Christian Elder	38	Ford	DAY; 36	CAR; 37	LVS; 38			TEX; 31		TAL; 43	CAL; 43							KEN; 26		DAY; 29	CHI; INQ^{†}																	31st	2351
2002	Mark Green	38	Ford				DAR; 17	BRI; 17					RCH; 28	NHA	NZH; 33	CLT; 35	DOV; 15	NSH; 12		MLW; 22		CHI; 41	GTY; 22	PPR; 19	IRP	MCH	BRI; 37	DAR	RCH; 16	DOV; 20	KAN; 16	CLT; 30	MEM; 38	ATL; 28	CAR; 19	PHO; 14	HOM; 30		31st	2351
2003	Kasey Kahne	38	Ford	DAY; 8	CAR; 26	LVS; 11	DAR; 8	BRI; 13	TEX; 9	TAL; 37	NSH; 29	CAL; 4	RCH; 18	GTY; 31	NZH; 12	CLT; 6	DOV; 8	NSH; 25	KEN; 11	MLW; 16	DAY; 38	CHI; 28	NHA; 9	PPR; 10	IRP; 14	MCH; 2	BRI; 14	DAR; 6	RCH; 12	DOV; 4	KAN; 30	CLT; 8	MEM; 15	ATL; 7	PHO; 27	CAR; 18	HOM; 1		9th	4104
2004	Kasey Kahne	38	Dodge	DAY; 43	CAR; 26	LVS; 2	DAR; 11	BRI; 27	TEX; 32	NSH; 3	TAL; 38	CAL; 5	GTY; 13	RCH; 10	NZH; 16	CLT; 25	DOV; 7	NSH; 6	KEN; 17		DAY; 6	CHI; 4	NHA; 4			MCH; 5	BRI; 34	CAL; 4	RCH; 9	DOV; 3	KAN; 13	CLT; 36		ATL; 4	PHO; 11	DAR; 11	HOM; 18		7th	4219
2004	Shane Hmiel	38	Dodge																	MLW; 4					IRP; 12														7th	4219
2004	Tyler Walker	38	Dodge																					PPR; 27									MEM; 12						7th	4219
2005	Kasey Kahne	38	Dodge	DAY; 5			LVS; 20	ATL; 5			TEX; 1			DAR; 34			DOV; 13				DAY; 25	CHI; 12						MCH; 27						CLT; 12					23rd	3213
2005	Tyler Walker	38	Dodge		CAL; 39	MXC; 24			NSH; 17	BRI; 35		PHO; 42			RCH; 28	CLT; 14		NSH; 19	KEN; 19	MLW; 40			NHA; 19	PPR; 23	GTY; 17	IRP; 37	GLN; 36												23rd	3213
2005	Casey Mears	38	Dodge										TAL; 26																										23rd	3213
2005	Mike Wallace	38	Dodge																										BRI; 14	CAL; 29	RCH; 26	DOV; 31	KAN; 21						23rd	3213
2005	A. J. Foyt IV	38	Dodge																																MEM; 32	TEX; 39	PHO; 42	HOM; 24	23rd	3213
2006	A. J. Foyt IV	38	Dodge	DAY; 42	CAL; 38	MXC; 21	LVS; 37	ATL; 33	BRI; 35	TEX; 41	NSH																												18th	3554
2006	Ryan Moore	38	Chevy									PHO; 29	TAL	RCH	DAR	CLT	DOV	NSH	KEN	MLW	DAY	CHI	NHA	MAR	GTY	IRP	GLN	MCH	BRI	CAL	RCH	DOV	KAN	CLT	MEM	TEX	PHO	HOM	18th	3554

=== Car #58 history ===
Akins added a second car to its stable in 2005, with Brent Sherman driving a Serta Mattress and Hickory Farms-sponsored Dodge. However, following the sale of team to Doug Stringer the team consolidated its operations to the #38 and sold the #58 to Glynn Motorsports.

==== Car No. 58 results ====
Year	Driver	No.	Make	1	2	3	4	5	6	7	8	9	10	11	12	13	14	15	16	17	18	19	20	21	22	23	24	25	26	27	28	29	30	31	32	33	34	35	NBSC	Pts
2004	Brent Sherman	58	Dodge	DAY	CAR	LVS	DAR	BRI	TEX	NSH	TAL	CAL	GTY	RCH	NZH	CLT	DOV	NSH	KEN	MLW	DAY	CHI	NHA	PPR	IRP	MCH	BRI	CAL	RCH	DOV	KAN; 37	CLT	MEM; 37	ATL	PHO	DAR	HOM; 30		75th	177
2005	Brent Sherman	58	Dodge	DAY; DNQ	CAL; 32	MXC; 23	LVS; 32	ATL; 31	NSH; 23	BRI; 36	TEX; 34	PHO; 24	TAL; 9	DAR; 32	RCH; DNQ	CLT; 34																							31st	2738
2005	Regan Smith	58	Dodge														DOV; 20	NSH; 15	KEN; 41	MLW; 29	DAY; 19	CHI	NHA	PPR	GTY	IRP	GLN	MCH	BRI	CAL	RCH	DOV	KAN	CLT	MEM	TEX	PHO	HOM	31st	2738

=== Car #98 history ===
In 1999, Akins formed a second car, the #98 with Lysol sponsorship with Elton Sawyer driving. He won his second race at New Hampshire International Speedway and finished fifth in points again.

In 2000, Sawyer continued to drive the 98, posting fourteen top-tens.

In 2001, clothing brand Starter and Hot Tamales came on board as sponsor and in April 2001 Akins sold the #98 team to Michael Kranefuss in order to focus on the #38. Sawyer posted a career-best nineteen top-ten finishes and finished fifth in points. At the end of the year, Starter and Hot Tamales left and unable to find a sponsor, Kranefuss was forced to disband the #98 team.

==== Car No. 98 results ====
Year	Driver	No.	Make	1	2	3	4	5	6	7	8	9	10	11	12	13	14	15	16	17	18	19	20	21	22	23	24	25	26	27	28	29	30	31	32	33	34	NBSC	Pts
1999	Elton Sawyer	98	Chevy	DAY; 21				DAR; 2		NSV; 8		TAL; 41																										5th	3891
1999	Elton Sawyer	98	Ford		CAR; 7	LVS; 26	ATL; 8		TEX; 12		BRI; 3		CAL; 7	NHA; 1	RCH; 34	NZH; 32	CLT; 8	DOV; 9	SBO; 23	GLN; 11	MLW; 34	MYB; 7	PPR; 8	GTY; 13	IRP; 8	MCH; 26	BRI; 7	DAR; 14	RCH; 16	DOV; 26	CLT; 19	CAR; 14	MEM; 3	PHO; 15	HOM; 13			5th	3891
2000	Elton Sawyer	98	Ford	DAY; 30	CAR; 12	LVS; 25	ATL; 18	DAR; 9	BRI; 12	TEX; 28	NSV; 13	TAL; 18	CAL; 9	RCH; 34	NHA; 9	CLT; 9	DOV; 9	SBO; 3	MYB; 3	GLN; 7	MLW; 6	NZH; 2	PPR; 25	GTY; 10	IRP; 6	MCH; 31	BRI; 29	DAR; 3	RCH; 19	DOV; 33	CLT; 29	CAR; 19	MEM; 2	PHO; 11	HOM; 40			7th	3776
2001	Elton Sawyer	98	Ford	DAY; 43	CAR; 29	LVS; 8	ATL; 35	DAR; 9	BRI; 17	TEX; 21	NSH; 5	TAL; 6	CAL; 12	RCH; 40	NHA; 9	NZH; 11	CLT; 19	DOV; 6	KEN; 4	MLW; 6	GLN; 6	CHI; 8	GTY; 8	PPR; 30	IRP; 4	MCH; 7	BRI; 5	DAR; 2	RCH; 8	DOV; 11	KAN; 16	CLT; 9	MEM; 26	PHO; 38	CAR; 10	HOM; 2		5th	4100
2003	Mark Green	98	Ford	DAY	CAR	LVS	DAR	BRI	TEX	TAL	NSH	CAL	RCH	GTY	NZH; 16	CLT	DOV	NSH	KEN	MLW	DAY	CHI	NHA	PPR	IRP	MCH	BRI	DAR	RCH	DOV	KAN	CLT	MEM	ATL	PHO	CAR	HOM	95th	115

== Craftsman Truck Series ==
=== Truck #38 history ===
During the 1995 season, Akins/Sutton also fielded a Craftsman Truck Series team with Sammy Swindell full-time driving with sponsorship from Channellock, posting five top-tens and a fourth place run at Bristol, finishing twelfth in points. The team racked up an astounding seven DNFs during the 20-race season. Akins/Sutton never fielded a truck again.

==== Truck No. 38 results ====
Year	Driver	No.	Make	1	2	3	4	5	6	7	8	9	10	11	12	13	14	15	16	17	18	19	20	NSTSC	Pts
1995	Sammy Swindell	38	Ford	PHO; 17	TUS; 7	SGS; 24	MMR; 10	POR; 13	EVG; 17	I70; 24	LVL; 13	BRI; 4^{*}	MLW; 12	CNS; 26	HPT; 21	IRP; 33	FLM; 10	RCH; 17	MAR; 36	NWS; 24	SON; 10	MMR; 32	PHO; 39	12th	2109

== See also ==
- Braun Racing
- Glynn Motorsports
- Robert Yates Racing
- Turner Scott Motorsports
