= Great Clips =

American hair salon chain

Great Clips, Inc.
- Type: Private
- Industry: Hair salon Franchising
- Founded: September 22, 1982; 44 years ago
- Founder: Steve Lemmon; David Rubenzer
- Headquarters: Bloomington, Minnesota
- Key people: Ray Barton (chairman of the board); Steve Hockett (CEO); Rob Goggins (president)
- Revenue: $1.03 billion
- Website: www.greatclips.com

Great Clips, Inc. is an American hair salon chain with over 4,530 locations across the United States and Canada. Its headquarters are located in Bloomington, Minnesota, a suburb of Minneapolis. In 2013, it had system-wide sales of $1.03 billion.

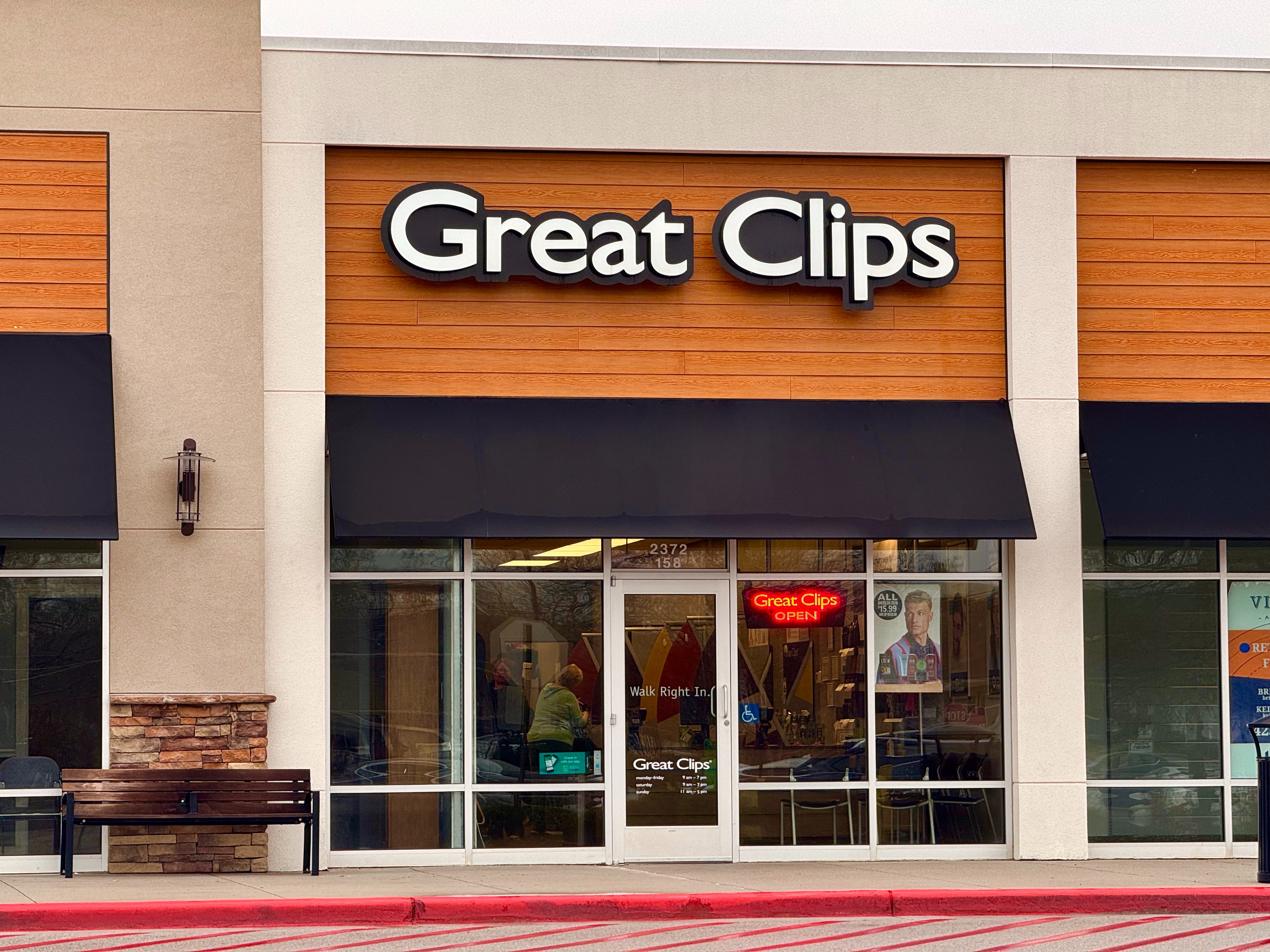
Great Clips salon in Chattanooga, Tennessee

== History ==
The first Great Clips salon opened under the name Super Clips near the University of Minnesota campus in Rochester on September 22, 1982. Great Clips salons specialized in no-frills, low-priced haircuts and found immediate success with their first three salons, which opened over a span of three months.

In early 1983, founders Steve Lemmon and David Rubenzer sought out a third partner, Ray Barton, to lead Great Clips' expansion and franchising.

The first franchised Great Clips salon opened for business on July 16, 1983, in Brooklyn Center, Minnesota. The company grew from 150 franchised salons in 1988 to 1,000 by 1997. The 2,500th salon was opened in 2006. The first franchisees, Mary Lou Barton (Ray Barton's wife) and Marylu and Roger Ledebuhr, are still Great Clips franchisees today. The Ledebuhrs opened the 3,000th Great Clips salon in 2011.

In 1984, the three owners recruited Rhoda Olsen (née Barton), Ray's sister, to work for Great Clips part-time as a training consultant to create training manuals and programs for franchisees and stylists. In March 1987, the partners convinced her to leave her position at Land O'Lakes to work full-time as the vice president of human resources at Great Clips.

In 1987, Lemmon and Rubenzer took a step back and named Barton president of the company. Ten years later, Barton bought out his partners—Lemmon, Rubenzer, and Jeff Elgin—to become the majority shareholder.

After 28 years as chief executive officer of Great Clips, Barton stepped down in 2011, promoting Rhoda Olsen, who had served as president since 1998. Former executive vice president Charlie Simpson was promoted to president of the company. In 2014, Simpson retired and Steve Hockett became company president.

In July 2020, Great Clips announced expanded safety measures to prevent the spread of COVID-19 in its salons.

== Corporate overview ==
=== Facts and figures ===
Great Clips has over 4,100 salons in North America.

In 2013, Great Clips reported an annual revenue of $1.03 billion. Over 30,000 stylists are employed by Great Clips salons.

=== Leadership (2025) ===
Ray Barton	Chairman of the Board
Rhoda Olsen	Vice-chair of the Board
Steve Hockett	Chief Executive Officer
Rob Goggins	President
Yvonne Mercer	Chief Operating Officer
Rachelle Johnson	Chief Financial Officer
Sara Yatchak	Vice President of Operations
Lisa Hake	Vice President of Marketing and Communications
Adam Husemann	Vice President of Expansion
Jared Nypen	Vice President of Talent
Michelle Sack	Vice President of Learning and Development
Kerry Bundy	Vice President of Legal, General Counsel and Corporate Secretary
Kevin Barnd	Vice President Of Business Technology Services

=== Business model ===
The company is known for no-appointment, no-frills salons that provide customers with haircuts. The stripped-down salons are, as president Rob Goggins has said, "Not flashy or sexy, but a very solid business model."

Lean investment and operating costs of franchises have enabled Great Clips to provide low-priced services and has led to 10-year growth for the company.

Great Clips has marketed itself as a low-cost franchise with high growth potential. As noted by Kiplingers, "The company has seen steady business, even during the Great Recession, because consumers tend to spend on grooming in both good times and bad."

=== Innovation ===
==== Online check-in ====
In 2011, Great Clips launched online check-in, the industry's first real-time check-in application, allowing customers to check wait times and add their names to the wait list before they visit the salon. The app has been downloaded more than 5 million times and is used by about 20% of its customers. During the ongoing COVID-19 pandemic, where usage of many online shopping, social media, and other services has increased dramatically, the engagement on the Great Clips App has tripled. This has resulted in higher online check-ins, as customers choose to wait in their vehicles or do shopping at surrounding stores as they wait. According to Great Clips franchisee polls, "It's around 70% in the majority of salons. Salons with working receptionists can see numbers as high as 85%."

==== Clip Notes ====
In 2014, Great Clips introduced Clip Notes to track customer data and provide consistent customer service across salons. Information tracked includes frequency of visits, preferred salon, and haircut preference.

== Charity ==
Since 1997, Great Clips, Inc. has hosted an annual charity golf tournament to benefit Children's Hospitals and Clinics of Minnesota. In 2013, the event raised $245,000.

Participating Great Clips salons in the U.S. and Canada raise money every October for the Children's Miracle Network Hospitals with the Miracle Balloon campaign.

In 2014, Great Clips introduced a new, company-wide charity initiative called Clips of Kindness to provide free clipper cuts for patients undergoing cancer treatments.

== Sponsorships ==
Great Clips is a sponsor of many professional sports teams, including the Detroit Tigers, Minnesota Twins, and Minnesota Wild.

Since 2001, Great Clips has sponsored NASCAR and other forms of motorsports, including the World of Outlaws Series. In 2001, they sponsored the Atkins Motorsports team with Minnesotan native Christian Elder behind the wheel of the 38 Ford. The next year, midway through April, Elder was replaced by Mark Green. The next year, they sponsored Kasey Kahne for his first fulltime season in the NASCAR Busch Series. He won his first race at Homestead-Miami Speedway. After that, many drivers drove the Great Clips car in the Series AAA Division including A. J. Foyt IV, Chase Pistone, and Tyler Walker. In 2007, Jason Leffler drove the 38 Great Clips Toyota Camry now for Turner Motorsports, from 2007 to 2011 when Great Clips became a sponsor of Kahne again in 2012. In 2012, Kahne and rookie Brad Sweet drove the 38 Chevy Impala. The next year, Great Clips ditched the 38 car and moved over to Hendrick Motorsports and JR Motorsports for 2013 with Kahne driving for Great Clips in the Cup Series and Sweet driving in Nationwide. In 2014, the sponsor left the Nationwide Series for Cup all together and sponsor Kahne on a part-time basis from 2014 to 2017. The sponsor left the sport and Kahne after the 2017 season to focus on Minnesota-based sports.

For NHRA events, they are a co-sponsor of Clay Millican's top fuel dragster.
