= Kasey Kahne =

American racing driver (born 1980)

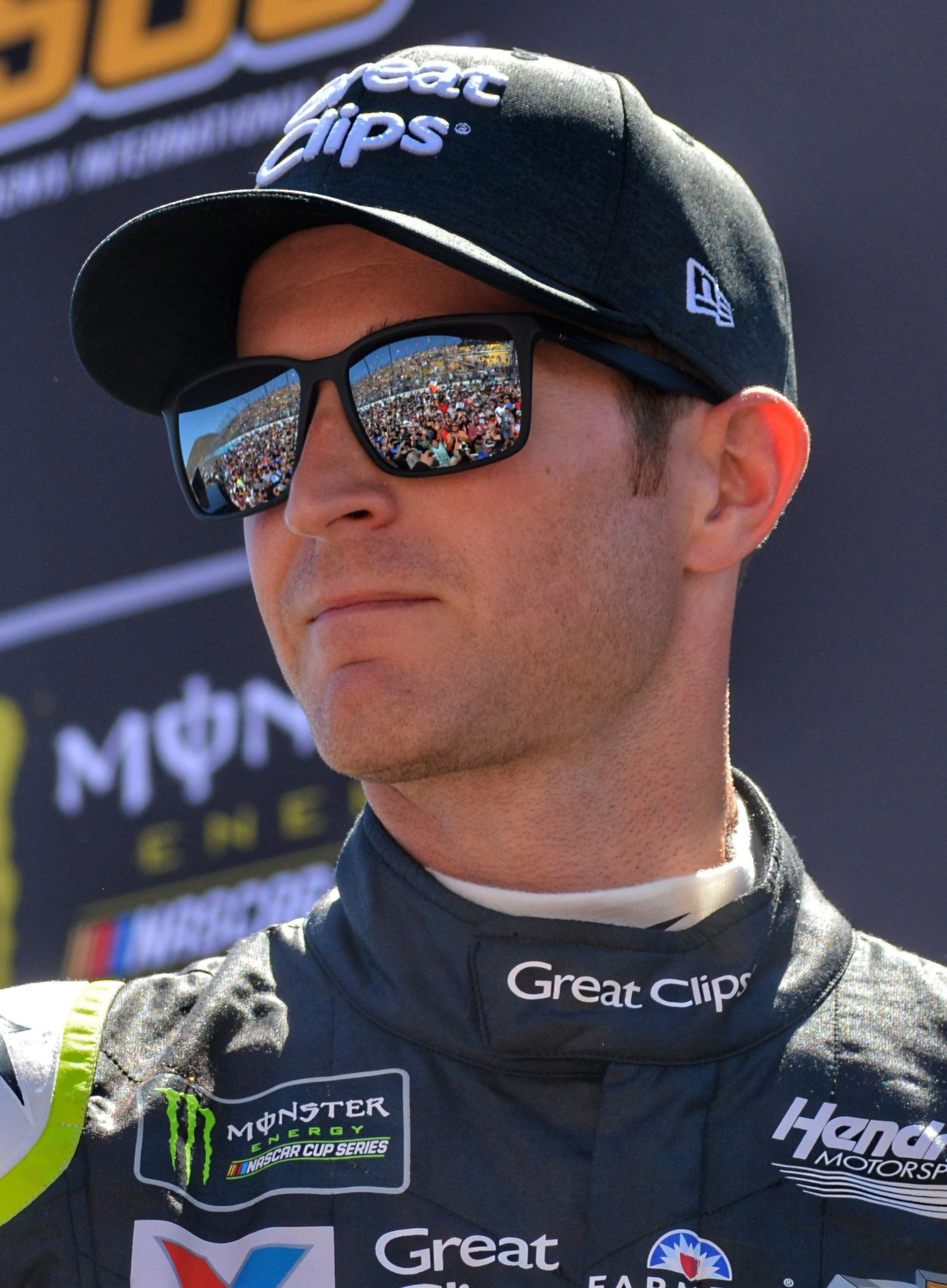
- Kahne at Phoenix International Raceway in 2017
- Born: Kasey Kenneth Kahne; April 10, 1980 (age 46); Enumclaw, Washington, U.S.
- Height: 5 ft 9 in (1.75 m)
- Weight: 145 lb (66 kg)
- Achievements: 2000 USAC National Midget Series champion; 2006, 2008, 2012 Coca-Cola 600 winner; Sprint All-Star Race XXIV winner; 2010 Gatorade Duel winner; 2017 Brickyard 400 winner; Has won with four separate engine manufacturers in NASCAR (Toyota, Chevy, Dodge, Ford)
- Awards: 2004 Nextel Cup Series Rookie of the Year; Named one of NASCAR's 75 Greatest Drivers (2023)

NASCAR Cup Series career
- 529 races run over 15 years
- 2018 position: 30th
- Best finish: 4th (2012)
- First race: 2004 Daytona 500 (Daytona)
- Last race: 2018 Bojangles' Southern 500 (Darlington)
- First win: 2005 Chevy American Revolution 400 (Richmond)
- Last win: 2017 Brickyard 400 (Indianapolis)
Wins	Top tens	Poles
18	176	27

NASCAR O'Reilly Auto Parts Series career
- 216 races run over 17 years
- 2025 position: 56th
- Best finish: 7th (2003)
- First race: 2002 1-866RBCTerm.com 200 (Rockingham)
- Last race: 2025 North Carolina Education Lottery 250 (Rockingham)
- First win: 2003 Ford 300 (Homestead)
- Last win: 2014 Subway Firecracker 250 (Daytona)
Wins	Top tens	Poles
8	87	9

NASCAR FedEx Freight Truck Series career
- 6 races run over 5 years
- Truck no., team: No. 77 (Spire Motorsports)
- 2015 position: 84th
- Best finish: 47th (2004)
- First race: 2004 Darlington 200 (Darlington)
- Last race: 2015 North Carolina Education Lottery 200 (Charlotte)
- First win: 2004 Darlington 200 (Darlington)
- Last win: 2015 North Carolina Education Lottery 200 (Charlotte)
Wins	Top tens	Poles
5	6	1

ARCA Menards Series career
- 1 race run over 1 year
- Best finish: 127th (2002)
- First race: 2002 Food World 300 (Talladega)
Wins	Top tens	Poles
0	0	0

ARCA Menards Series East career
- 1 race run over 1 year
- Best finish: 51st (2008)
- First race: 2008 U.S. Cellular 200 presented by Wellmark (Iowa)
Wins	Top tens	Poles
0	1	0
- Statistics up to date as of November 1, 2025.

Kasey Kenneth Kahne (/keɪn/; born April 10, 1980) is an American professional dirt track racing and stock car racing driver. Currently, Kahne competes in High Limit Racing, driving the No. 4 sprint car for his own team, Kasey Kahne Racing, and will compete in the NASCAR Truck Series full time driving the No. 77 Chevrolet Silverado RST for Spire Motorsports in 2027.

Off the track, Kahne is active in charitable work and is a member of the President's Council on Service and Civic Participation. He also owns his own race team, Kasey Kahne Racing, which competes in the World of Outlaws and High Limit Racing series, fielding two sprint cars for himself and Brad Sweet. Kahne is a two-time Skagit Speedway winner of the Annual Jim Raper memorial Dirt Cup (2002 and 2003) and currently holds the fastest lap record there. Kahne scored 18 career wins in the Cup Series, including 3 Coca-Cola 600s in 2006, 2008, and 2012, and the Brickyard 400 in 2017. He was also the NASCAR Nextel Cup Series Rookie of the Year in 2004. He retired from racing before the end of the 2018 Cup Series season for health reasons and was replaced at Leavine Family Racing by Regan Smith. In 2023, he was named as one of NASCAR's 75 Greatest Drivers.

== Early life ==
Kasey Kahne was born on April 10, 1980, in Enumclaw, Washington, to his parents Kelly and Tammy. His father Kelly was a mechanics enthusiast with a background in motorsports, and his mother Tammy, would later manage aspects of his early career. He has an older sister Shanon and a younger brother Kale. He grew up on a 50-acre (20 ha) rural property where he rode four-wheelers and dirt bikes. Growing up he also participated in other sports like baseball and basketball, and he would drive snowmobiles in the mountains during the winter.

== Racing career ==
=== Beginnings ===
Kahne began racing open-wheel sprint cars at Deming Speedway at seventeen in Deming, Washington, before moving up to Skagit Speedway in Alger, Washington, and then he moved to USAC. In 2000, Kahne made a trip to Pennsylvania where he won the season opener at the historic Williams Grove Speedway. He was hired by Steve Lewis, who had also employed future NASCAR drivers Jeff Gordon, Jason Leffler, Tony Stewart and Kenny Irwin Jr. In his first year on the circuit, he was named Rookie of the Year, as well as winning the national midget championship. He continued to run USAC, as well as the Toyota Atlantic Series and the World of Outlaws.

=== Xfinity and Camping World Truck Series ===
In 2002, Kahne made 20 starts in the Busch Series driving the No. 98 Channellock Ford Taurus for Robert Yates Racing. His best finish was a tenth place finish at Cabela's 250. A year later, he moved to the No. 38 Great Clips Ford for Akins Motorsports full-time. He won his first pole at Michigan International Speedway and his first Busch Series race at the Ford 300. Kahne finished seventh in the points standings. With his move to full-time competition in the Cup Series in 2004, he also drove 30 races for Akins in the Busch Series, finishing 13th in points. In 2005, he made 22 starts in the Busch Series, splitting time with Akins and Evernham's new No. 6 team. He won the O'Reilly 300 at Texas Motor Speedway and the United Way 300 at Kansas Speedway.

On May 26, 2007, Kahne won the Busch Series' Carquest Auto Parts 300 race at Lowe's Motor Speedway for his first win of 2007. On August 24, 2007, Kahne won the pole for the Cup Series' Sharpie 500 at Bristol, his second pole of the 2007 Nextel Cup Series season. Later that night, during the Busch Series' Food City 250, Kahne passed Ryan Newman on the top side in a three-wide pass that included Jason Leffler on the bottom. He held off the hard-charging Leffler to score his seventh career Busch win and his second of 2007.

In 2009, Kahne ran fewer events in other NASCAR series than in previous seasons, only seven (four in the Nationwide Series, three in the Whelen Modified Tour). With fewer distractions, Kahne's Sprint Cup stats slightly improved that year.

During the 2014 Nationwide season, Kahne scored an upset win at the Nationwide Series' Subway Firecracker 250, passing teammate Regan Smith on the final lap. The margin was 0.021 seconds.

On January 24, 2025, NASCAR announced that Kahne would return to the driver's seat for the Xfinity Series race at Rockingham Speedway on April 19.

Kahne has six career starts in the NASCAR Camping World Truck Series, winning five of them; his lone non-victory is a second-place run at Pocono Raceway in 2010. In 2004, he made a pair of starts in the series at Darlington Raceway and Homestead–Miami Speedway, driving the No. 2 Team ASE Racing Dodge Ram for Ultra Motorsports, winning both races. At the 2015 Charlotte Truck race, he held off Erik Jones for the win by .005 seconds, the second-closest margin in Truck Series history.

=== Cup Series ===
Kahne replaced Bill Elliott in the No. 9 Dodge for Evernham Motorsports at the end of the 2003 season when Elliott announced a part-time schedule starting with the 2004 season. Since Kahne was still under contract with Ford, the manufacturer filed a lawsuit against him after he joined Evernham Motorsports. U.S. District Judge Robert Cleland ruled in favor of Kahne, citing a clause in his contract with Ford that stipulated that the manufacturer had to provide Kahne with a full-time ride on a Ford team that both parties mutually agreed upon. That clause also stipulated that if an agreement could not be reached by either party, then Kahne could seek a ride with a different manufacturer, without breaking the terms of his contract with Ford.

==== Evernham Motorsports (2004–2007) ====
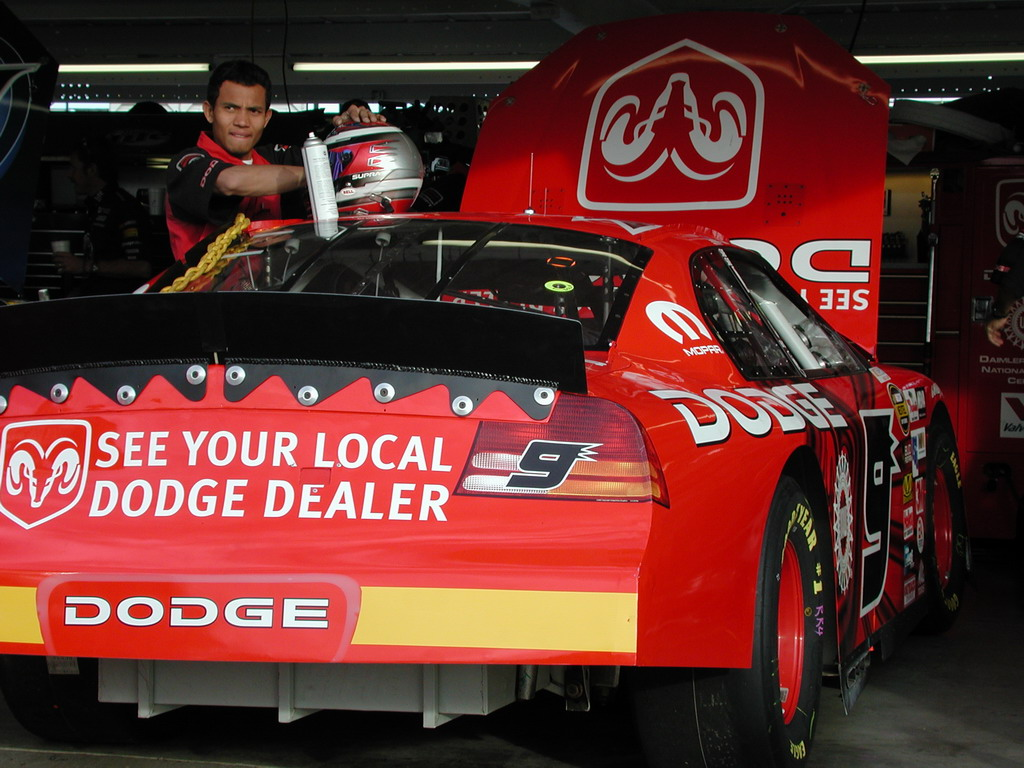
Kahne's 2004 No. 9 Dodge

In 2004, Kahne surprised many by nearly winning several races (including five 2nd-place finishes and 13 Top 5's), winning four poles, and capturing the Raybestos Rookie of the Year Award. He narrowly missed the Chase for the Nextel Cup after Jeremy Mayfield, his teammate, claimed the final spot.

In 2005, Kahne scored his first career Nextel Cup victory in his sophomore season 2005, after a dominating performance in the Chevy American Revolution 400 at Richmond International Raceway. It was also the first win for the Dodge Charger, which returned to NASCAR that year. It was the first time a Dodge won a race at Richmond International Raceway since Richard Petty did so in 1975. In addition, he became the first driver born in the 1980s to win a race in NASCAR's premier series. He also scored two poles in back-to-back weeks at Darlington and Richmond during the same year. Despite this, he was plagued with inconsistency and slumped to 23rd in the points.

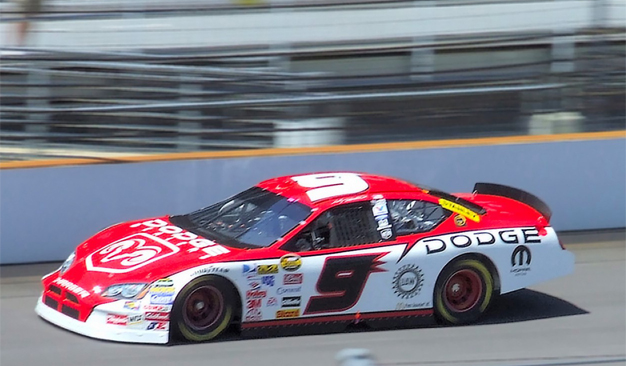
Kahne races by in the No. 9 Dodge Charger.

On March 20, 2006, Kahne won the rain-delayed Golden Corral 500 at Atlanta Motor Speedway. Nearly three weeks later, he won the Samsung/Radio Shack 500 at Texas. After that, he won four more races – a season sweep at Lowe's Motor Speedway in the Coca-Cola 600 and in the Bank of America 500 holding off Jimmie Johnson (who finished second in both races) and victories at California and Michigan.

On September 9, 2006, Kahne successfully raced his way into the Chase for The Cup after finishing third in Richmond. He was the tenth and last qualifier to make the Chase. He edged defending Nextel Cup Champion Tony Stewart out by sixteen points, but a disappointing sixteenth-place finish at New Hampshire, a crash at Dover, and running out of gas at Kansas ended his hopes for his first championship title. Kahne finished strong with five top-tens in the remaining seven races, including winning the Bank of America 500 at Charlotte Motor Speedway.

On November 27, 2006, Kahne was honored by being invited to raise the traditional 12th Man flag prior to the Seattle Seahawks Monday Night Football game against the Green Bay Packers at Qwest Field in Seattle. The ceremony has been ongoing since 2003, and involves a different Seattle-area sports hero and/or beloved member of the community kicking things off before every Seahawks home game. The Seahawks beat the Packers 34–24.

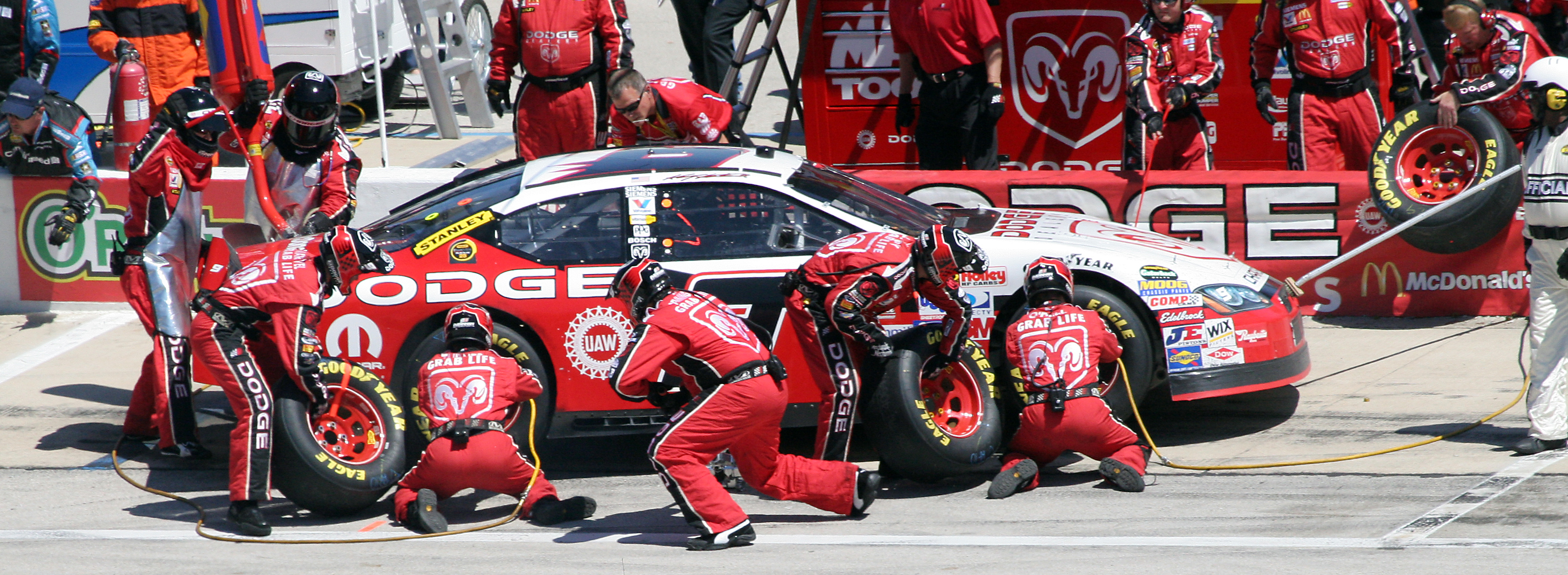
Kahne in a pit stop during the 2007 Samsung 500 at Texas Motor Speedway

During the qualifying for the 2007 Daytona 500, officials found holes in the wheel wells of his Dodge Charger. A crew member said it was just tape that had fallen off a hole in the tire. Officials said that the tape had been cut. He was one of the four drivers among Matt Kenseth and his two teammates, Scott Riggs and Elliott Sadler, whose cars had been found with aerodynamic-improving modifications. His team was one of the six teams found with illegal modifications in the Daytona festivities.

At the Sharpie 500, a day after winning the pole and the Busch race, Kahne dominated most of the race, leading 305 out of 500 laps and finishing second to Carl Edwards. This was his best finish of the 2007 season. After a disappointing 2007 season, Kahne finished nineteenth in points with zero wins, one top-five, eight top-tens, and an average finish of 22.2.

==== Gillette Evernham Motorsports and Richard Petty Motorsports (2008–2010) ====
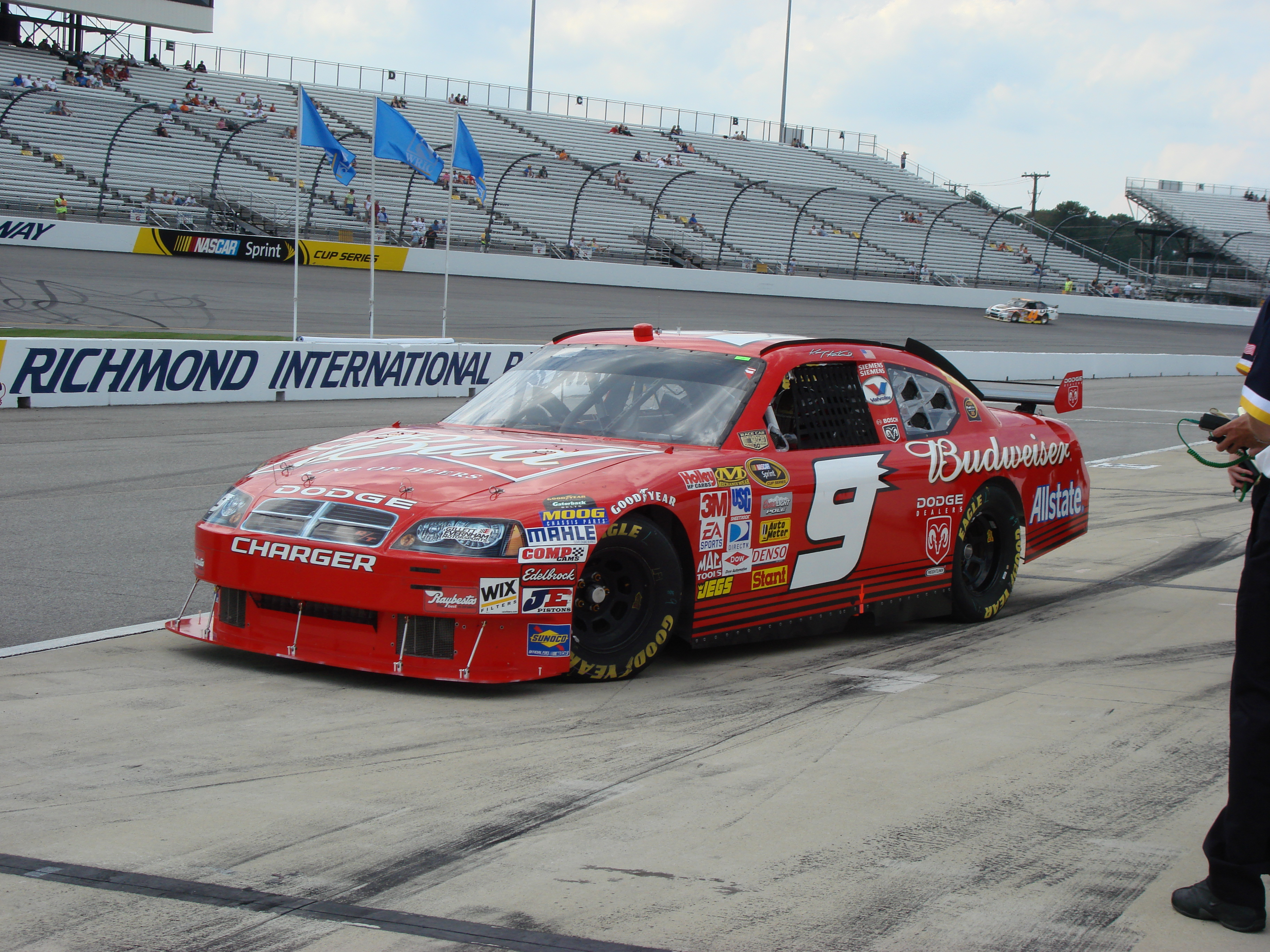
Kahne's 2008 Sprint Cup Series racecar

With the new sponsor Budweiser, Kahne started off the 2008 season strong by finishing in the top-ten in both the Budweiser Shootout and the Gatorade Duel. As a result of a fourth place finish in the duel, Kahne started tenth in the 50th Daytona 500 on February 17, 2008. He finished seventh behind teammate Elliott Sadler in the 2008 Daytona 500; this was a repeat of the 2007 race, where they both also finished sixth and seventh, respectively.

In the early laps of the Auto Club 500, Kahne worked his way from twentieth to fourteenth, but brushed the wall on lap 7. However, he was able to finish ninth after the race went under a long rain delay. Kahne had to start in the back due to an engine change in the UAW-Dodge 400 at Las Vegas Motor Speedway, but he did go on to finish sixth.

On May 17, 2008, Kahne was voted into the Sprint All-Star Race XXIV by his fans via cell phone text messaging and online voting. After making a required "stop-and-go" pit stop, Kahne began the fourth segment second on old tires. He went on to win the race and earn $1,012,975. Kahne became the first driver to win the race from the fan vote and the third driver to race in the Sprint Showdown and go on to win the All-Star race.

On May 25, 2008, he won his second Coca-Cola 600 passing Tony Stewart with two laps to go, as Stewart had a flat tire going into turn 1. This was Kahne's first points-paying win of the season. He also became the sixth driver to win the 600 and the Sprint All-Star Race in the same season.

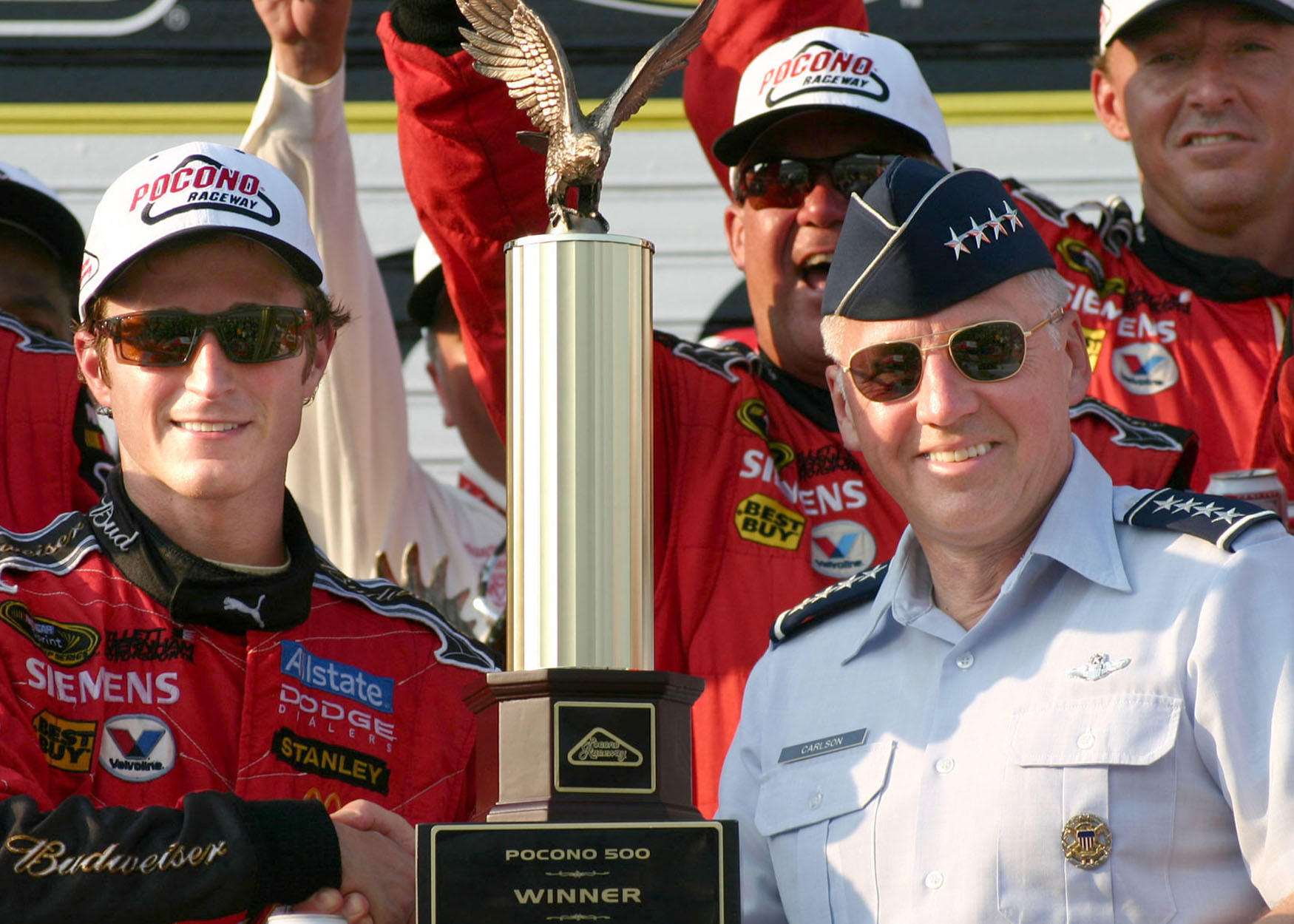
Kahne receives his 2008 Pocono 500 trophy.

On June 6, 2008, Kahne won the Pocono 500 from the pole despite being 38th at one point during the race after a miscue in the pits. On June 20, 2008, he won another pole for the Toyota/Save Mart 350 at Infineon Raceway, his second pole in three races. However, after handling issues early in the race, Kahne fell victim to pit road, went a lap down, and finished 33rd.

Following two consecutive 40th-place finishes (a Bristol Motor Speedway wreck caused by miscommunications between Casey Mears and his spotter, and an engine failure at Michigan International Speedway), Kahne found himself sitting outside of the Top 12, out of contention for the Chase. At the start of the last regular season race, at Richmond International Raceway, he, David Ragan, and Clint Bowyer were vying for that 12th spot. Unfortunately for him, Kahne was not able to make up enough points to put him into the Chase for the Sprint Cup. He missed the 2008 Chase by 69 points and ended the season finishing 14th.

Kahne's new team for 2009, Richard Petty Motorsports, was the result of a merger between his team's previous incarnation, Gillett Evernham Motorsports, and Petty Enterprises. The year started off inconsistently for Kahne, with early top-ten finishes at Atlanta and Bristol. Kahne won the Toyota/Save Mart 350 event on June 21, 2009, for his first road course win.

After a hot summer streak that saw three top-tens in a row, Kahne climbed into Chase contention. During the Pep Boys Auto 500 on September 6, 2009, Kahne made a late race pass and held off Kevin Harvick for his second win of the season. Following the first 26 races of the season, Kahne was in the top-twelve in points, earning him a place in the Chase for the Championship. He was seeded fourth in points. After suffering an engine failure at New Hampshire and a crash in California, Kahne struggled to get back into contention for the championship and finished 10th in the final season standings, despite finishing second in the AMP Energy 500 at Talladega Superspeedway.

On September 10, 2009, it was announced that Richard Petty Motorsports would merge with Yates Racing. Kahne would remain as one of four drivers of RPM alongside his current teammates Sadler and Allmendinger, as well as Yates Racing driver Paul Menard. The team changed manufacturers to Ford and received Roush-Yates engines and other equipment from Roush Fenway Racing.

Driving the new Ford Fusion car, Kahne won the Gatorade Duel No. 2 at Daytona International Speedway on February 11, 2010. He also finished in second position in the 2010 Budweiser Shootout. Kahne ended up 30th in the Daytona 500 after being wrecked late in the race. He had been running up front for most of the race and had the fastest lap of the race. Kahne had a strong car at the Auto Club 500; however, he spun late in turn 4.

Kahne had a good run at Atlanta a few weeks later where he led the most laps in the race, and finished inside the top-five. During the following couple of months, Kahne would be unable to compete for race wins as mistakes and wrecks put a dent into the team's Chase hopes.

During the Gillette Fusion ProGlide 500 at Pocono Raceway he had a top-five car all race long, but due to a late race caution, some teams stayed out on track instead of joining the leaders on pit-road. This put Kahne in the back end of the Top 20, and during the green-white-checkered finish, Kahne tried to make it three-wide while battling for tenth place. However, he was blocked and ran down into the wet grass by his teammate A. J. Allmendinger. Kahne spun back into the racing surface and was hit by Greg Biffle and Mark Martin. The No. 9 car took off and landed on top of the outside wall, hit a tree behind the wall, and spun back onto the track on all four wheels. Kahne and Biffle both put the blame on Allmendinger for causing the huge crash.

Kahne rebounded from the disappointment at Pocono by leading laps in the following race at Michigan and finishing second, behind the dominant Denny Hamlin. He also qualified on pole for the Toyota/Save Mart 350 at Infineon Raceway the following week; and converted the pole position into a solid fourth-place finish, after bouncing back from a poor first stint, to post back-to-back top-five finishes.

In qualifying for the 2010 Carfax 400 at Michigan International Speedway, Kahne earned his second pole position of the season. On October 3, 2010, Kahne started the Price Chopper 400 at Kansas Speedway from the pole position.

On October 20, 2010, Kahne was released from the remainder of his contract with Richard Petty Motorsports. The next day, it was announced that Kahne would drive for Team Red Bull for the remainder of the season as well as the full 2011 season starting with the TUMS Bring It On 500 at Martinsville Speedway.

After the 2010 season finale in Homestead, Kahne went in for knee surgery due to discomfort and pain caused by plica syndrome.

==== Red Bull Racing (2011) ====
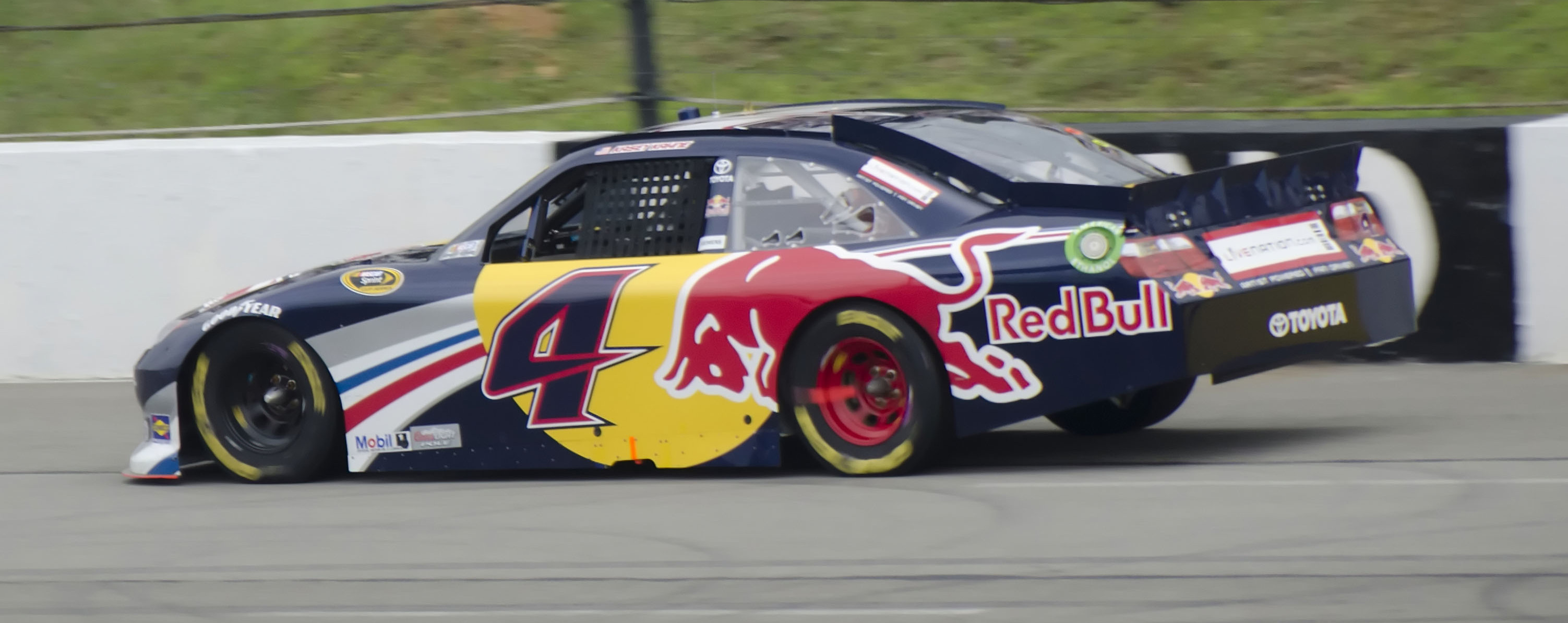
Kasey Kahne in the No. 4 at Pocono Raceway in 2011

On April 13, 2010, Kahne announced that he would be leaving Richard Petty Motorsports at the end of the 2010 season to race in 2012 with Hendrick Motorsports, driving the No. 5. On August 10, 2010, Team Red Bull officially announced that Kahne would drive one of their cars for the 2011 NASCAR Sprint Cup season, a tenure that would start in the 2010 season after Kahne was released from RPM. Kahne used the number 4 for his Red Bull Toyota, an homage to the number he used in Sprint Cars. Prior to the acquisition, the No. 4 was made famous by Morgan-McClure Motorsports. Kahne won his first pole for Red Bull Racing the year prior at the 2010 season finale at Homestead driving the No. 83. On June 9, 2011, it was announced that Farmers Insurance Group would sponsor Kahne for 22 races in 2012. It was also announced that his current crew chief Kenny Francis will join him at Hendrick.

Kahne dominated the early stages of the Brickyard 400, but spun late in the race and had to settle for 18th position. He led 48 laps, a race-high.

He did not make it into the 2011 Chase for the Sprint Cup, resting at 21st in points following the cut-off race, the Wonderful Pistachios 400 at Richmond International Raceway on September 10, 2011.

On November 13, 2011, at the newly configured Phoenix International Raceway, Kahne held off Carl Edwards in the closing laps to take his first victory of the season, his first victory for Team Red Bull, and Kahne's first victory in over two years. Kahne only led the final fourteen laps of the race.

Kahne finished the 2011 season fourteenth in points.

==== Hendrick Motorsports (2012–2017) ====
In 2012, Kahne drove the No. 5 Farmers Insurance/Quaker State/HendrickCars.com Chevrolet for Hendrick Motorsports, consequent with Mark Martin's move to Michael Waltrip Racing. In the Budweiser Shootout, he was involved in an early accident in the first segment. His teammates Jeff Gordon, Jimmie Johnson, and Dale Earnhardt Jr. were eliminated in crashes during the second segment. Kahne qualified and ran well in his Gatorade Duel, but in the Daytona 500 was taken out in a crash on lap 188 involving Jamie McMurray, Regan Smith, Carl Edwards, Brad Keselowski, Tony Stewart, and Aric Almirola. He finished 29th.

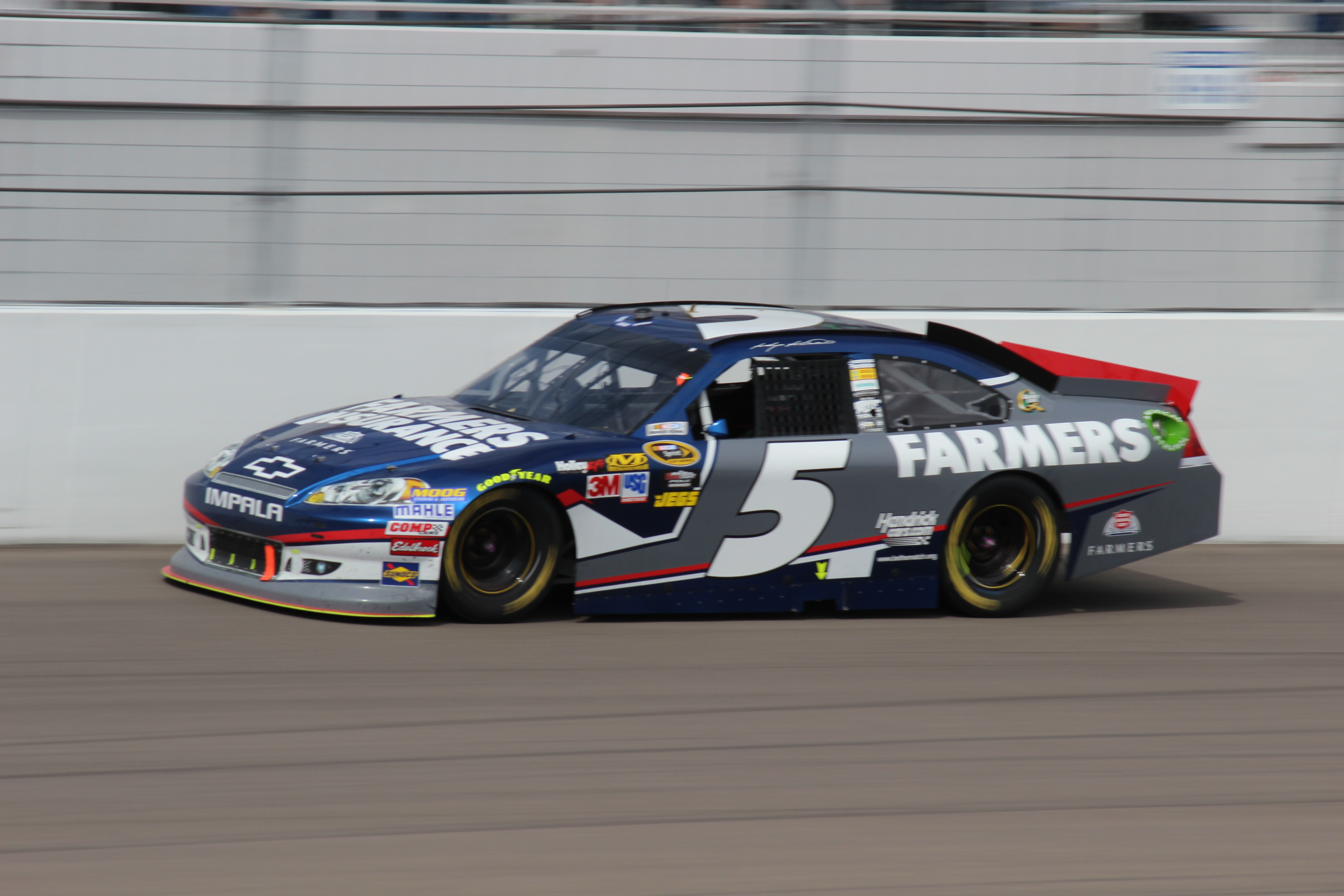
Kahne at 2012 Kobalt Tools 400

Kahne announced in late March that he would compete for Turner Motorsports in the Camping World Truck Series at Rockingham Speedway in April, driving the No. 4 in the Good Sam Roadside Assistance 200. In that race, he led 47 laps and went on to win.

Kahne had a rough start to 2012, finishing no better than fourteenth in the first five races. However, he rebounded with seven straight top-ten finishes, including a win in the 2012 Coca-Cola 600 in his 300th Sprint Cup Start. This was also his first win with Hendrick Motorsports. On July 15, 2012, Kahne won the Lenox Industrial Tools 301 at Loudon, and along with teammate Jeff Gordon made the Chase through the two Wild Card spots. During the Chase, Kahne won poles at Talladega and Kansas. He ended the season a career-best fourth place in the points, with two wins, four poles, twelve top-fives, and nineteen top-tens.

Kahne had a slow start to 2013, finishing 36th and nineteenth at Daytona and Phoenix, respectively. However, at Las Vegas, he led 114 laps (which was almost twice the number of laps he had led in all of his previous Vegas starts) and finished second to Matt Kenseth despite an impressive charge in the last laps. Kahne was able to redeem himself for this near-miss the following week by winning at Bristol. After Bristol, he had a strong run at Auto Club Speedway in which he finished ninth—he then had an even stronger run at Martinsville, where he had one of the best cars and finished fourth. He then finished 11th at Texas. At Kansas, Kahne again finished second to Kenseth in a finish very similar to the finish at Las Vegas.

Kahne's season also started with a number of run-ins with Kyle Busch, who wrecked him in three of the first eleven races: at the Daytona 500, Kahne was running in the top-five when Busch turned him approaching turn 1 on lap 33, resulting in a seven-car wreck also collecting Tony Stewart, Juan Pablo Montoya, Jamie McMurray, and other cars. At Talladega, on lap 43, Kahne was in the outside lane when Busch turned him into the wall again heading towards turn 1. Kahne bounced off the wall and back into Busch and collected an additional fourteen cars, including Kevin Harvick, David Reutimann, Brian Vickers, Tony Stewart, Marcos Ambrose, Greg Biffle, Jeff Burton, Casey Mears, Jamie McMurray, Jeff Gordon, Kurt Busch, David Stremme, and Scott Speed. Later, at Darlington, another incident happened when Busch sent Kahne into the wall while being challenged for the lead late in the race, causing a caution. At the Coca-Cola 600, Kahne had influenza and there was doubt he could finish the race. This did not stop him from leading the most laps and nearly winning the race, but Kevin Harvick got by him on a restart with eleven laps to go. At Michigan, Kahne led the race, but slid into the turn 2 wall, and the car caught fire. Kahne finished 38th and dropped down four spots in the points standings to twelfth.

Following the retirement at Michigan, Kahne rebounded with a sixth-place finish at Sonoma and an eleventh place finish at Kentucky. At Daytona, Kahne was running behind Jimmie Johnson for most of the race until he got tagged by Marcos Ambrose on a late restart, sending him into the inside wall on the back straightaway and relegating him to a 32nd-place finish. This was followed by an eleventh place finish at New Hampshire and a third place finish at Indianapolis.

At Pocono in August, Kahne started eighteenth. He led 66 laps of the race and was involved in a tight battle with Tony Stewart for the lead in the final laps. A decision by Gordon to take the final restart on lap 158 on the inside lane gave Kahne the opportunity to draft past Gordon in turn 1 and then sail away to his second career Pocono race victory and second win of the 2013 season, bringing him up to eighth place in the points. His form did not carry to Watkins Glen, though, where he was wrecked by Matt Kenseth on a late restart that saw him collide with Dale Earnhardt Jr. and finish 34th. Kahne then had a seventh place finish at Michigan, and then a runner-up finish at Bristol behind Kenseth for the third time in 2013.

He qualified for the Chase, but any chance of him winning ended with a crash at Loudon. Early in the 2013 Sylvania 300, Kahne got loose, wheel-hopped, and hit a barrier extremely hard. Kahne was uninjured but caused controversy when he acted like he could not hear a reporter in his interview, which led many to speculate that Kahne suffered a head injury. Kahne apologized for causing the false alarm and said he was too angry to talk about it and that he was not injured. He later revealed on a February 2025 episode of The Dale Jr. Download that he had suffered a concussion.

Kahne struggled in the first half of the 2014 season. He came close to a win at Pocono in June but hit the outside barrier late in the event, costing him his shot at the win. Kahne said that Kyle Busch was yet again responsible for the crash, and Busch himself took responsibility that night. When Kahne heard that Busch apologized for the wreck, he shrugged it off and said, "I don't care to talk to him anymore about our wrecks. Tired of his aggressiveness and the fact that his performances are affecting my own results."

Kahne began ending rumors of his departure from Hendrick Motorsports with a sponsorship extension with Farmers Insurance for twelve races in the 2015–2017 seasons. At the Brickyard 400, Kahne led seventy laps due to great track position but lost the lead on a restart with seventeen laps left to Jeff Gordon and ended up sixth.

At Atlanta, Kahne controlled the final fifteen laps of the race. With three laps to go, it seemed like he lost it when a caution came out. He lost four spots on pit road, but after two more cautions, sped by Matt Kenseth and won the race to clench a spot in the Chase. It was his first and only win of 2014. He finished fifteenth in the standings, being eliminated from round two of the Chase. Kahne received a three-year contract extension with HMS in November, which would run until the conclusion of the 2018 season. It was announced a day earlier that long-time engineer and Jamie McMurray's 2014 crew chief, Keith Rodden, would return to HMS and replace Kenny Francis as Kahne's crew chief. Francis had been Kahne's crew chief since the 2005 NASCAR Nextel Cup race at Homestead–Miami Speedway. Replacing Francis ended the second-longest driver/crew chief pairing in NASCAR in the first two decades of the 21st century.

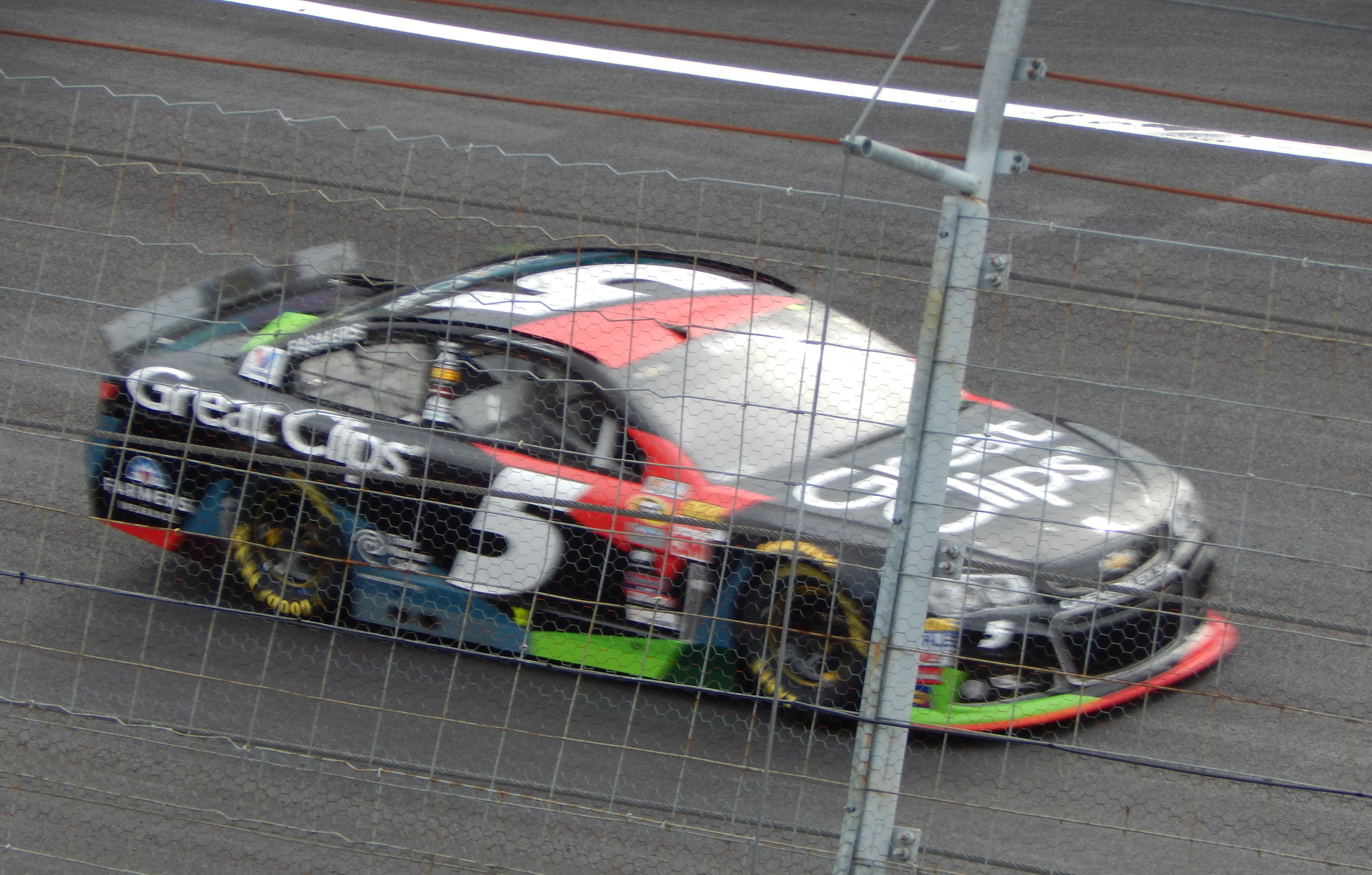
Kahne's car during practice for the 2015 Food City 500 at Bristol Motor Speedway

Kahne made his return to the Camping World Truck Series driving the No. 00 Haas Automation Silverado for JR Motorsports at Charlotte. Kahne beat 18-year-old Erik Jones by 0.005 seconds, which was tied for the second closest finish in NASCAR Truck Series competition. The win was Chevrolet's 200th win in the Camping World Truck Series. In the Cup Series, Kahne would start off with a ninth-place finish in the Daytona 500. He would struggle throughout most of the year, and would only get ten top-tens and three top-fives, his best finish being fourth at Phoenix, Dover, and the Kansas Chase race. Kahne finished the season in 18th place in the final points standings.

Kahne experienced a difficult 2016 season as he finished seventeenth in the final points standings with only three top-fives and thirteen top-tens.. During the season, Kahne did not lead a single lap in any race despite completing the most laps in the series.

Kahne's 2017 Season started off similar to previous years, but did managed to lead laps compared to the previous year. After disappointing races at the beginning of the year, things began to look up. In July 2017, Kahne returned to Victory Lane at the Brantley Gilbert Big Machine Brickyard 400, surviving a crash-laden race that took out many contending cars, including holding off Brad Keselowski on an overtime restart that ended under caution. It was Kahne's eighteenth win in the Cup Series and first in 102 races. The race was also the reason that the NASCAR sanctioning body eliminated the Overtime Line.

On August 7, 2017, Hendrick Motorsports announced Kahne would not be returning to the team for the 2018 season, and two days later, William Byron was announced as Kahne's replacement. It was simultaneously announced that the No. 5 car, Hendrick's original entry in NASCAR, would disappear from Hendrick Motorsports going forward. In 2020, the No. 5 car returned when it was assigned to Kyle Larson.

After the opening race in the chase at Chicagoland Speedway, crew chief Keith Rodden was replaced with Darian Grubb after many lackluster finishes. Right away, Kahne was one of the fastest cars at Loudon, but bad luck plagued the No. 5 team in the Playoffs, and they had an early playoff exit. At the end of the season, he ended up with a career low in top-tens with six and tied his career low of top-fives with three. He also led 41 laps in 2017, his second career lowest after the aforementioned 2016 season, where he did not lead a lap at all. Kahne announced he would drive the 95 Leavine Family Racing Chevrolet Camaro ZL1 in 2018, replacing Michael McDowell.

==== Leavine Family Racing (2018) ====
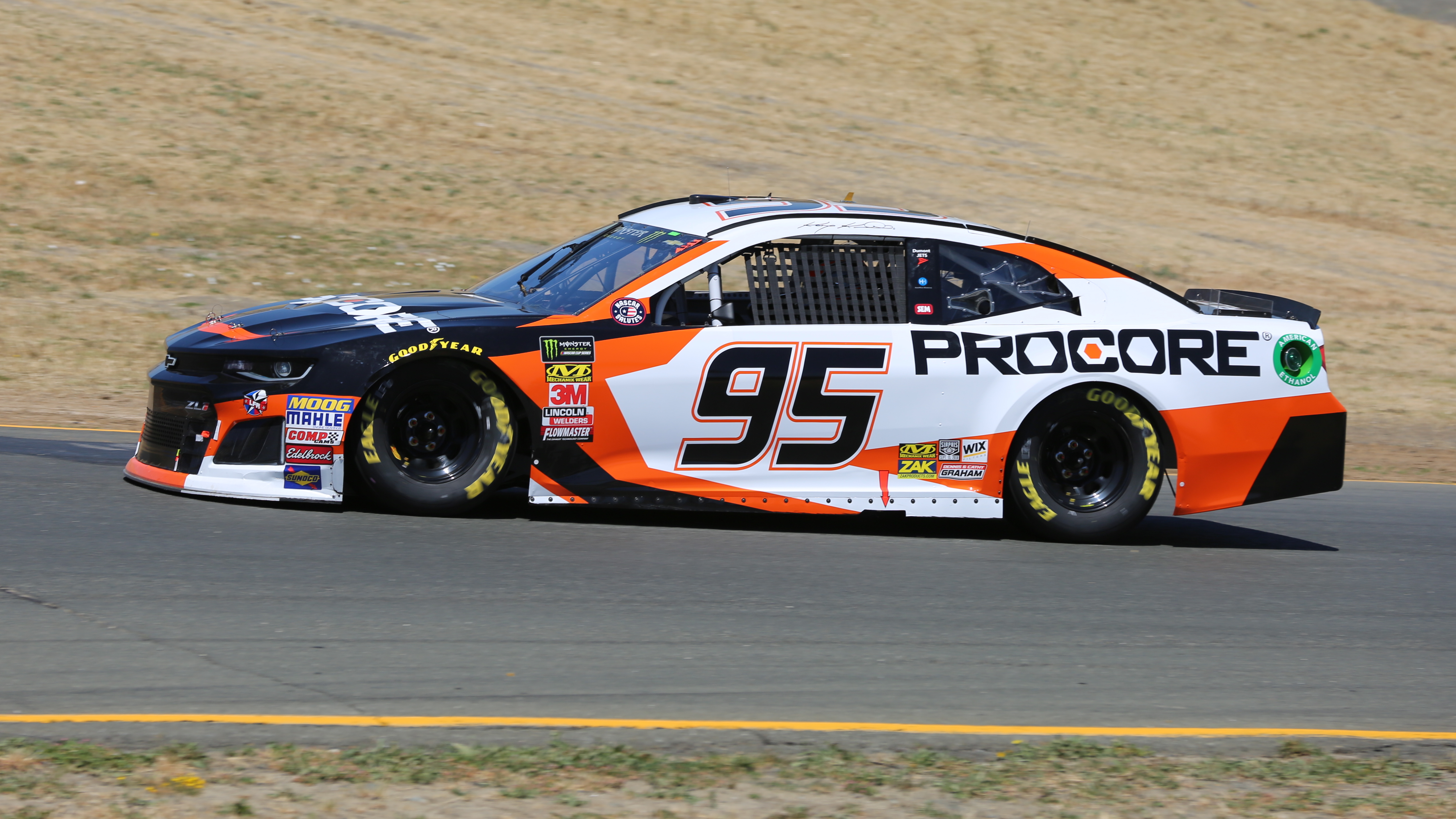
Kahne's No. 95 at Sonoma Raceway in 2018

On September 19, 2017, Kahne announced he would be driving the No. 95 for Leavine Family Racing in 2018. In the offseason, Leavine announced he would pair up with Hendrick Motorsports team engineer Travis Mack who previously substituted for Greg Ives when he crew chiefed for Dale Earnhardt Jr. to his best run in 2017. Kahne finished tenth in the All-Star race after going four laps down from a wreck. After a very disappointing first half, which included his best run of seventeenth place on three occasions, and a firing of crew chief Travis Mack for lead engineer John Leonard. He led a season high seventeen laps and scored the most points at the Coke Zero 400 at Daytona. On the final restart, Kahne tried to make a move to the lead but stalled out due to not getting help. He fell back in line and finished fourth, a season best for him, tying the team's best finish as well as moving up three spots in the standings to 25th.

On August 16, 2018, Kahne stated his intention to step away from full-time competition at the end of the year. On September 6, 2018, after heat exhaustion from the race before at Darlington, Kahne announced that he would sit out the 2018 Brickyard 400 at Indianapolis and be replaced by Regan Smith, which would be the first race Kahne had not raced in since he began his full time career in the Cup Series. Following the Brickyard race, it was announced that Kahne would continue to sit out for the next three races with Smith still filling in.

On October 9, 2018, he announced on Twitter that he would sit out for the remainder of the year, ending his fifteen-year career prematurely.

=== Return to dirt racing ===
On March 29, 2019, Kahne was injured in a hard sprint car accident at Williams Grove Speedway, and Australian driver James McFadden replaced him. Kahne did not race again for over a year, with his first race back coming at Knoxville Raceway on May 8, 2020; he finished eleventh in the last chance qualifier.

On December 22, 2021, Kahne announced that he would compete full-time with the World of Outlaws in 2022, driving the Kasey Kahne Racing No. 9 car.

On December 3, 2023, Kahne announced that he would compete full-time with High Limit Racing in 2024.

In late April 2026, it was announced that Kasey Kahne would replace Anthony Macri in the 39M 410 sprint car for ten races in May. The reason Kahne replaced Macri for ten races is because of an injury Macri sustained in a race at Williams Grove. Kahne's partnership through the first five races that he has run with Macri Motorsports has been successful, with the highlight coming on May 8, 2026, with Kahne picking up his first ever World of Outlaws feature win as a driver, winning at Williams Grove Speedway. Kahne led all 25 laps in the event, but it did not come easy holding off drivers David Gravel and Sheldon Haudenschild.

=== Return to NASCAR ===
On January 24, 2025, Kahne announced he would return to the Xfinity Series for one race at Rockingham in 2025, driving the Richard Childress Racing No. 33 car with sponsorship from HendrickCars.com. His car would get damage from contact with William Sawalich and Katherine Legge, but he ended up finishing in fourteenth place (originally fifteenth before Jesse Love was disqualified).

=== Spire Motorsports (2027) ===
On October 7, 2026, it was announced that Kahne will return to full-time racing in NASCAR for the first time since 2018, driving the Spire Motorsports No. 77 truck.

== Personal life ==
During most of his time in NASCAR, Kahne preferred to keep his personal life private and rarely revealed any details aside from his racing career. Although he has not married, Kahne and his former girlfriend, Samantha Sheets, became parents to a son on October 13, 2015. The couple is known to have an amicable relationship following their split sometime before 2018. Later, Kahne began dating Amy Long, a former sports reporter, in 2020. Kahne and Amy had a baby girl in early 2023.

== Film and television ==
Kahne was featured in the premiere episode of the 2006 Biography Channel series Driven to Win. This 30-minute program covered Kahne's childhood and entry into NASCAR, as well as his 2004 Rookie of the Year season and his first win in 2005. He was also featured in two episodes of the second season of NASCAR 360 on the FX Network.

Kasey Kahne Racing, NASCAR Media Group, and Motorsports Management International partnered to produce the 2009 release, "The Rise of Kahne." This 90-minute biographical profile features interviews with Kahne, his family, and other NASCAR personalities. Footage covers the stock-car racer's open-wheel roots and successes leading up to his June 2009 win at Infineon Raceway, his first for Richard Petty Motorsports. The DVD also shows his work with the Kasey Kahne Foundation and his own sprint car race team.

Kahne's No. 9 Dodge Dealers-sponsored car appeared in the 2005 Disney film Herbie: Fully Loaded, with Kahne as one of the four drivers who boxed Herbie in and pummeled him in the final race. He is mentioned by name by one of the race announcers.

In 2010, Kahne made a brief appearance in the music video "Smoke a Little Smoke" by Eric Church.

In 2013, Kahne alongside Dale Earnhardt Jr. and Tony Stewart voiced themselves in an episode of The Cleveland Show.

In 2016, Kahne voiced Fender in four episodes of the Nickelodeon series Blaze and the Monster Machines.

== Motorsports career results ==
=== Racing career summary ===
Season	Series	Team	Races	Wins	Top 5	Top 10	Points	Position
2002	ARCA Re/Max Series	Robert Yates Racing	1	0	0	0	160	127th
2002	NASCAR Busch Series	Robert Yates Racing	20	0	0	1	1887	33rd
2003	NASCAR Busch Series	Akins Motorsports	34	1	4	14	4104	7th
2004	NASCAR Craftsman Truck Series	Ultra Motorsports	2	2	2	2	380	47th
2004	NASCAR Busch Series	Akins Motorsports	30	0	9	14	3698	11th
2004	NASCAR Nextel Cup Series	Evernham Motorsports	36	0	13	14	4274	13th
2005	NASCAR Busch Series	Akins Motorsports	10	1	3	3	2511	21st
2005	NASCAR Busch Series	Evernham Motorsports	12	1	3	3	2511	21st
2005	NASCAR Nextel Cup Series	Evernham Motorsports	36	1	5	8	3611	23rd
2006	NASCAR Busch Series	Evernham Motorsports	17	2	4	6	1959	31st
2006	NASCAR Nextel Cup Series	Evernham Motorsports	36	6	12	19	6173	8th
2007	NASCAR Busch Series	Gillett Evernham Motorsports	18	2	2	7	2199	27th
2007	NASCAR Nextel Cup Series	Gillett Evernham Motorsports	36	0	1	8	3489	19th
2008	NASCAR Camping World East Series	Dave Davis Motorsports	1	0	1	1	175	51st
2008	NASCAR Nationwide Series	Gillett Evernham Motorsports	10	0	1	5	1277	41st
2008	NASCAR Sprint Cup Series	Gillett Evernham Motorsports	36	2	4	14	4085	14th
2009	NASCAR Whelen Modified Tour	John Holland	1	0	0	0	179	45th
2009	NASCAR Whelen Modified Tour	Alan Heinke	1	0	0	0	179	45th
2009	NASCAR Nationwide Series	Braun Racing	5	0	1	2	562	71st
2009	NASCAR Sprint Cup Series	Richard Petty Motorsports	36	2	7	14	6128	10th
2010	NASCAR Camping World Truck Series	Kyle Busch Motorsports	1	0	1	1	175	77th
2010	NASCAR Nationwide Series	Braun Racing	7	0	1	2	816	55th
2010	NASCAR Nationwide Series	Turner Motorsports	1	0	0	0	816	55th
2010	NASCAR Sprint Cup Series	Richard Petty Motorsports	31	0	7	9	3961	20th
2010	NASCAR Sprint Cup Series	Team Red Bull	5	0	0	1	3961	20th
2011	NASCAR Camping World Truck Series	Kyle Busch Motorsports	1	1	1	1	0	NC†
2011	NASCAR Nationwide Series	Turner Motorsports	10	0	3	4	0	NC†
2011	NASCAR Nationwide Series	JR Motorsports	2	0	2	2	0	NC†
2011	NASCAR Sprint Cup Series	Team Red Bull	36	1	8	15	1041	14th
2012	NASCAR Camping World Truck Series	Turner Motorsports	1	1	1	1	0	NC†
2012	NASCAR Nationwide Series	Turner Motorsports	15	0	3	9	0	NC†
2012	NASCAR Sprint Cup Series	Hendrick Motorsports	36	2	12	19	2345	4th
2013	NASCAR Nationwide Series	JR Motorsports	11	0	3	7	0	NC†
2013	NASCAR Sprint Cup Series	Hendrick Motorsports	36	2	11	14	2283	12th
2014	NASCAR Nationwide Series	JR Motorsports	3	1	2	2	0	NC†
2014	NASCAR Sprint Cup Series	Hendrick Motorsports	36	1	3	11	2234	15th
2015	NASCAR Camping World Truck Series	JR Motorsports	1	1	1	1	0	NC†
2015	NASCAR Xfinity Series	JR Motorsports	7	0	3	4	0	NC†
2015	NASCAR Sprint Cup Series	Hendrick Motorsports	36	0	3	10	939	18th
2016	NASCAR Xfinity Series	JR Motorsports	1	0	1	1	0	NC†
2016	NASCAR Sprint Cup Series	Hendrick Motorsports	36	0	3	13	898	17th
2017	NASCAR Xfinity Series	JR Motorsports	2	0	1	1	0	NC†
2017	Monster Energy NASCAR Cup Series	Hendrick Motorsports	36	1	3	6	2198	15th
2018	Monster Energy NASCAR Cup Series	Leavine Family Racing	25	0	1	1	358	30th
2023	SRX Series	N/A	1	0	0	0	0	23rd
2025	NASCAR Xfinity Series	Richard Childress Racing	1	0	0	0	23	56th

^{†} As Kahne was a guest driver, he was ineligible for championship points.

=== NASCAR ===
(key) (Bold – Pole position awarded by qualifying time. Italics – Pole position earned by points standings or practice time. * – Most laps led.)

==== Monster Energy Cup Series ====
Monster Energy NASCAR Cup Series results
Year	Team	No.	Make	1	2	3	4	5	6	7	8	9	10	11	12	13	14	15	16	17	18	19	20	21	22	23	24	25	26	27	28	29	30	31	32	33	34	35	36	MENCC	Pts	Ref
2004	Evernham Motorsports	9	Dodge	DAY; 41	CAR; 2	**LVS**; 2	ATL; 3	**DAR**; 13	BRI; 40	TEX; 2*	MAR; 21	TAL; 30	**CAL**; 13	RCH; 28	CLT; 12	DOV; 21	**POC**; 14	MCH; 2	SON; 31	DAY; 25	CHI; 36	NHA; 8	POC; 3	IND; 4	GLN; 14	MCH; 5	BRI; 21	CAL; 2	RCH; 24	NHA; 4	DOV; 42	TAL; 27	KAN; 12	CLT; 32*	MAR; 15	ATL; 5	PHO; 5	DAR; 5	HOM; 38	13th	4274	
2005	Evernham Motorsports	9	Dodge	DAY; 22	CAL; 40	LVS; 38	ATL; 5	BRI; 14	MAR; 2	TEX; 35	PHO; 17	TAL; 24	**DAR**; 3	**RCH**; 1*	CLT; 26	DOV; 35	POC; 27	MCH; 18	SON; 41	DAY; 16	CHI; 41	NHA; 6	POC; 27	IND; 2	GLN; 17	MCH; 29	BRI; 42	CAL; 6	RCH; 8	NHA; 38	DOV; 16	TAL; 13	KAN; 19	CLT; 23	MAR; 17	ATL; 35	TEX; 42	PHO; 27	HOM; 16	23rd	3611	
2006	Evernham Motorsports	9	Dodge	DAY; 11	CAL; 4	LVS; 4	**ATL**; 1	BRI; 10	MAR; 35	**TEX**; 1	PHO; 6	TAL; 39	RCH; 34	**DAR**; 21	CLT; 1*	DOV; 7	POC; 7	MCH; 1	SON; 31	DAY; 25	CHI; 23	NHA; 8	POC; 31	IND; 36	GLN; 22	MCH; 4	BRI; 12	CAL; 1*	RCH; 3	NHA; 16	DOV; 38	**KAN**; 33	TAL; 2	CLT; 1*	MAR; 7	ATL; 38	TEX; 33	PHO; 7	**HOM**; 4*	8th	6173	
2007	Evernham Motorsports	9	Dodge	DAY; 7	CAL; 38	**LVS**; 35	ATL; 39	BRI; 19	MAR; 25	TEX; 20	PHO; 31	TAL; 12	RCH; 40	DAR; 20	CLT; 23	DOV; 11	POC; 22	MCH; 32	SON; 23	NHA; 25	DAY; 9	CHI; 32	IND; 40	POC; 27																19th	3489	
2007	Gillett Evernham Motorsports	9	Dodge																						GLN; 26	MCH; 31	**BRI**; 2*	CAL; 10	RCH; 8	NHA; 20	DOV; 32	KAN; 9	TAL; 16	CLT; 8	MAR; 15	ATL; 9	TEX; 18	PHO; 40	HOM; 24	19th	3489	
2008	Gillett Evernham Motorsports	9	Dodge	DAY; 7	CAL; 9	LVS; 6	ATL; 28	BRI; 7	MAR; 17	TEX; 25	PHO; 36	TAL; 23	RCH; 10	DAR; 22	CLT; 1	DOV; 31	**POC**; 1*	MCH; 2	**SON**; 33	NHA; 30	DAY; 7	CHI; 15	IND; 7	POC; 7	GLN; 14	MCH; 40	BRI; 40	CAL; 8	RCH; 19	NHA; 11	DOV; 26	KAN; 21	TAL; 36	CLT; 2	MAR; 33	ATL; 33	TEX; 24	PHO; 13	HOM; 6	14th	4085	
2009	Richard Petty Motorsports	9	Dodge	DAY; 29	CAL; 12	LVS; 11	ATL; 7	BRI; 5	MAR; 19	TEX; 19	PHO; 13	TAL; 36	RCH; 29	DAR; 23	CLT; 7	DOV; 6	POC; 15	MCH; 21	SON; 1*	NHA; 10	DAY; 15	CHI; 3	IND; 7	POC; 5	GLN; 17	MCH; 11	BRI; 28	ATL; 1	RCH; 12	NHA; 38	DOV; 8	KAN; 6	CAL; 34	CLT; 3	MAR; 32	TAL; 2	TEX; 33	PHO; 15	HOM; 17	10th	6128	
2010	Richard Petty Motorsports	9	Ford	DAY; 30	CAL; 34	LVS; 9	ATL; 4*	BRI; 34	MAR; 17	PHO; 39	TEX; 5	TAL; 21	RCH; 21	DAR; 20	DOV; 20	CLT; 12	POC; 27	MCH; 2	**SON**; 4	NHA; 36*	DAY; 2	CHI; 6	IND; 13	POC; 19	GLN; 17	**MCH**; 14	BRI; 5	ATL; 32	RCH; 29	NHA; 14	DOV; 28	**KAN**; 37	CAL; 4	CLT; 38						20th	3961	
2010	Team Red Bull	83	Toyota																																MAR; 14	TAL; 26	TEX; 13	PHO; 30	**HOM**; 6	20th	3961	
2011	Team Red Bull	4	Toyota	DAY; 25	PHO; 6	LVS; 14	BRI; 9	CAL; 9	MAR; 39	TEX; 21	TAL; 37	RCH; 3	**DAR**; 4*	DOV; 36	CLT; 22	KAN; 14	POC; 12	MCH; 28	SON; 20	DAY; 4	KEN; 13	NHA; 6	IND; 18*	POC; 28	GLN; 26	MCH; 7	BRI; 11	**ATL**; 34	RCH; 38	CHI; 12	NHA; 15	DOV; 4	KAN; 2	CLT; 4	TAL; 6	MAR; 25	TEX; 3	PHO; 1	HOM; 7	14th	1041	
2012	Hendrick Motorsports	5	Chevy	DAY; 29	PHO; 34	**LVS**; 19	BRI; 37	CAL; 14	**MAR**; 38	TEX; 7	KAN; 8	RCH; 5	TAL; 4	DAR; 8	CLT; 1	DOV; 9	POC; 29	MCH; 33	SON; 14	KEN; 2	DAY; 7	NHA; 1	IND; 12	POC; 2	GLN; 13	MCH; 3	BRI; 9	ATL; 23	RCH; 12	CHI; 3	NHA; 5	DOV; 15	**TAL**; 12	CLT; 8	**KAN**; 4	MAR; 3	TEX; 25	PHO; 4	HOM; 21	4th	2345	
2013	Hendrick Motorsports	5	Chevy	DAY; 36	PHO; 19	LVS; 2*	BRI; 1	CAL; 9	MAR; 4	TEX; 11	KAN; 2	RCH; 21	TAL; 42	DAR; 17	CLT; 2*	DOV; 23	POC; 36	MCH; 38	SON; 6	KEN; 11	DAY; 32	NHA; 11	IND; 3	POC; 1*	GLN; 34	MCH; 7	BRI; 2	ATL; 36	RCH; 14	CHI; 12	NHA; 37	DOV; 13	KAN; 15	CLT; 2*	TAL; 36	MAR; 27	TEX; 5	PHO; 2	HOM; 13	12th	2283	
2014	Hendrick Motorsports	5	Chevy	DAY; 31	PHO; 11	LVS; 8	BRI; 8	CAL; 41	MAR; 22	TEX; 11	DAR; 37	RCH; 14	TAL; 8	KAN; 3	CLT; 14	DOV; 19	POC; 42	MCH; 5	SON; 6	KEN; 8	DAY; 27	NHA; 11	IND; 6*	POC; 10	GLN; 12	MCH; 16	BRI; 35	ATL; 1	RCH; 17	CHI; 13	NHA; 23	DOV; 20	KAN; 22	CLT; 10	TAL; 12	MAR; 40	TEX; 38	PHO; 21	HOM; 12	15th	2234	
2015	Hendrick Motorsports	5	Chevy	DAY; 9	ATL; 14	LVS; 17	PHO; 4	CAL; 17	MAR; 11	TEX; 8	BRI; 37	RCH; 6	TAL; 34	KAN; 17	CLT; 12	DOV; 4	POC; 13	**MCH**; 15	SON; 8	DAY; 32	KEN; 27	NHA; 19	IND; 24	POC; 43	GLN; 42	MCH; 15	BRI; 16	DAR; 12	RCH; 18	CHI; 24	NHA; 9	DOV; 6	CLT; 43	KAN; 4	TAL; 19	MAR; 9	TEX; 20	PHO; 26	HOM; 19	18th	939	
2016	Hendrick Motorsports	5	Chevy	DAY; 13	ATL; 23	LVS; 10	PHO; 22	CAL; 28	MAR; 22	TEX; 8	BRI; 17	RCH; 4	TAL; 39	KAN; 16	DOV; 4	CLT; 22	POC; 6	MCH; 13	SON; 9	DAY; 30	KEN; 14	NHA; 25	IND; 18	POC; 15	GLN; 20	BRI; 13	MCH; 14	DAR; 7	RCH; 6	CHI; 7	NHA; 9	DOV; 12	CLT; 3	KAN; 10	TAL; 35	MAR; 11	TEX; 8	PHO; 13	HOM; 37	17th	898	
2017	Hendrick Motorsports	5	Chevy	DAY; 7	ATL; 4	LVS; 12	PHO; 20	CAL; 20	MAR; 14	TEX; 38	BRI; 20	RCH; 22	TAL; 5	KAN; 15	CLT; 35	DOV; 17	POC; 35	MCH; 21	SON; 24	DAY; 18	KEN; 38	NHA; 28	IND; 1	POC; 11	GLN; 16	MCH; 38	BRI; 24	DAR; 24	RCH; 12	CHI; 21	NHA; 35	DOV; 14	CLT; 9	TAL; 8	KAN; 15	MAR; 16	TEX; 11	PHO; 19	HOM; 33	15th	2198	
2018	Leavine Family Racing	95	Chevy	DAY; 34	ATL; 21	LVS; 19	PHO; 24	CAL; 24	MAR; 24	TEX; 17	BRI; 34	RCH; 29	TAL; 17	DOV; 17	KAN; 21	CLT; 20	POC; 36	MCH; 23	SON; 20	CHI; 27	DAY; 4	KEN; 25	NHA; 19	POC; 30	GLN; 21	MCH; 26	BRI; 15	DAR; 24	IND	LVS	RCH	ROV	DOV	TAL	KAN	MAR	TEX	PHO	HOM	30th	358	

===== Daytona 500 =====
Year	Team	Manufacturer	Start	Finish
2004	Evernham Motorsports	Dodge	27	41
2005	Evernham Motorsports	Dodge	37	22
2006	Evernham Motorsports	Dodge	27	11
2007	Evernham Motorsports	Dodge	28	7
2008	Gillett Evernham Motorsports	Dodge	10	7
2009	Richard Petty Motorsports	Dodge	15	29
2010	Richard Petty Motorsports	Ford	4	30
2011	Team Red Bull	Toyota	11	25
2012	Hendrick Motorsports	Chevrolet	20	29
2013	Hendrick Motorsports	Chevrolet	6	36
2014	Hendrick Motorsports	Chevrolet	5	31
2015	Hendrick Motorsports	Chevrolet	13	9
2016	Hendrick Motorsports	Chevrolet	13	13
2017	Hendrick Motorsports	Chevrolet	26	7
2018	Leavine Family Racing	Chevrolet	26	34

==== Xfinity Series ====
NASCAR Xfinity Series results
Year	Team	No.	Make	1	2	3	4	5	6	7	8	9	10	11	12	13	14	15	16	17	18	19	20	21	22	23	24	25	26	27	28	29	30	31	32	33	34	35	NXSC	Pts	Ref
2002	Robert Yates Racing	98	Ford	DAY	CAR; 31	LVS	DAR	BRI; 32	TEX; 36	NSH	TAL	CAL; 18	RCH; 30	NHA	NZH	CLT; 29	DOV; 20	NSH	KEN	MLW	DAY; 25	CHI; 25	GTW	PPR	IRP; 15	MCH; 10	BRI; DNQ	DAR; 18	RCH; 15	DOV; 19	KAN; 27	CLT; 32	MEM	ATL; 21	CAR; 16	PHO; 18	HOM; 21		33rd	1887	
2003	Akins Motorsports	38	Ford	DAY; 8	CAR; 26	LVS; 11	DAR; 8	BRI; 13	TEX; 9	TAL; 37	NSH; 29	CAL; 4	RCH; 18	GTW; 31	NZH; 12	CLT; 6	DOV; 8	NSH; 25	KEN; 11	MLW; 16	DAY; 38	CHI; 28	NHA; 9	PPR; 10	IRP; 14	**MCH**; 2	BRI; 14	DAR; 6	RCH; 12	DOV; 4	KAN; 30	CLT; 8	MEM; 15	ATL; 7	PHO; 27	CAR; 18	HOM; 1		7th	4104	
2004	Akins Motorsports	38	Dodge	DAY; 43	CAR; 26	LVS; 2	DAR; 11	BRI; 27	TEX; 32	NSH; 3	TAL; 38	CAL; 5	GTW; 13	RCH; 10	NZH; 16	CLT; 25	DOV; 7	NSH; 6	KEN; 17	MLW	DAY; 6	CHI; 4	NHA; 4	PPR	IRP	MCH; 5	BRI; 34	CAL; 4	**RCH**; 9	**DOV**; 3	KAN; 13	CLT; 36	MEM	ATL; 4	PHO; 11	DAR; 11	HOM; 18		11th	3698	
2005	Akins Motorsports	38	Dodge	DAY; 5	CAL	MXC	LVS; 20	ATL; 5			TEX; 1*			DAR; 34			DOV; 13	NSH	KEN	MLW	DAY; 25	CHI; 12						MCH; 27						CLT; 12	MEM				21st	2511	
2005	Evernham Motorsports	6	Dodge						NSH; 15	BRI		**PHO**; 28	TAL; 31			**CLT**; 41											GLN; 13		BRI; 19	CAL; 5	RCH	DOV	KAN; 1			TEX	PHO; 38	HOM; 39	21st	2511	
2005	Evernham Motorsports	79	Dodge												**RCH**; 4								NHA; 12	PPR	GTW	IRP													21st	2511	
2006	Evernham Motorsports	9	Dodge	DAY; 33	CAL	MXC	LVS; 1	ATL; 2	BRI	TEX; 11	NSH	PHO	TAL	RCH; 40	DAR; 11	CLT; 16	DOV; 22	NSH	KEN	MLW	DAY; 35	CHI; 30	NHA	MAR	GTW	IRP	GLN	MCH	BRI; 4	CAL; 1	RCH	DOV	KAN; 16	CLT; 43	MEM; 8	TEX; 24	PHO	HOM; 8	31st	1959	
2007	Evernham Motorsports	9	Dodge	DAY; 41	CAL	MXC	LVS; 28	ATL; 7	BRI; 19	NSH	TEX; 28	PHO	TAL; 21	RCH	DAR	CLT; 1*	DOV; 12	NSH	KEN	MLW	NHA	DAY; 6	CHI; 12	GTW	IRP	CGV	GLN												27th	2199	
2007	Gillett Evernham Motorsports	9	Dodge																									MCH; 31	BRI; 1	CAL; 6	RCH; 9	DOV	KAN; 12	CLT; 17	MEM	TEX	PHO; 6	HOM; 25	27th	2199	
2008	Gillett Evernham Motorsports	9	Dodge	DAY; 35	CAL	LVS	ATL; 9	BRI; 2	NSH	TEX; 21	PHO	MXC	TAL	**RCH**; 14	DAR	CLT; 16	DOV; 10	NSH	KEN	MLW	NHA	DAY; 6	CHI	GTW	IRP	CGV	GLN	MCH	BRI	CAL	RCH	DOV	KAN; 7	CLT; 11	MEM	TEX	PHO	HOM	41st	1277	
2009	Braun Racing	10	Toyota	DAY	CAL	LVS	BRI	TEX	NSH	PHO	TAL	RCH	DAR	CLT	DOV	NSH	KEN	MLW	NHA	DAY; 5	CHI	GTW	IRP	IOW	GLN	MCH	BRI; 37	CGV	ATL; 11	RCH	DOV	KAN	CAL			TEX; 30	PHO	HOM	71st	562	
2009	Braun Racing	43	Toyota																															CLT; 8	MEM				71st	562	
2010	Braun Racing	38	Toyota	DAY; 9	CAL	LVS	BRI; 32	NSH	PHO	TEX	TAL	RCH	DAR; 4	DOV; 27	CLT; 26	NSH	KEN	ROA	NHA	DAY	CHI	GTW	IRP	IOW	GLN	MCH	BRI; 37	CGV	**ATL**; 19	RCH	DOV	KAN	CAL	CLT	GTW	TEX	PHO		55th	816	
2010	Turner Motorsports	38	Chevy																																			HOM; 38	55th	816	
2011	Turner Motorsports	38	Chevy	DAY; 11	PHO	LVS	BRI; 2	CAL	TEX; 11	TAL	NSH	RCH	DAR; 7	DOV	IOW													BRI; 19	ATL; 5	RCH		DOV; 4	KAN	CLT; 28	TEX	PHO	HOM		106th	0^{1}	
2011	Turner Motorsports	30	Chevy													CLT; 22	CHI	MCH	ROA	DAY											CHI; 33								106th	0^{1}	
2011	JR Motorsports	7	Chevy																		KEN; 4	NHA; 3	NSH	IRP	IOW	GLN	CGV												106th	0^{1}	
2012	Turner Motorsports	38	Chevy	DAY; 9	PHO; 18	LVS; 10	BRI; 2	CAL	TEX; 3	RCH; 10	TAL	DAR; 18	IOW	CLT; 17	DOV	MCH	ROA	KEN	DAY	NHA; 6	CHI	**IND**; 25	IOW	GLN; 7	CGV	BRI; 14	ATL; 28	RCH	CHI	KEN	DOV; 8	CLT	KAN	TEX	PHO; 5	HOM			111th	0^{1}	
2013	JR Motorsports	5	Chevy	DAY; 20	PHO	LVS	BRI	CAL	TEX; 8	RCH	TAL; 3	DAR; 9	CLT; 2	DOV; 6	IOW	MCH	ROA	KEN	DAY	NHA; 19	CHI	IND; 26	IOW	GLN; 18	MOH	BRI; 8	ATL; 4	RCH	CHI	KEN	DOV	KAN	CLT	TEX	PHO	HOM			100th	0^{1}	
2014	JR Motorsports	5	Chevy	DAY	PHO	LVS	BRI	CAL	TEX	DAR	RCH	TAL; 22	IOW	CLT	DOV	MCH	ROA	KEN	DAY; 1	NHA	CHI; 4	IND	IOW	GLN	MOH	BRI	ATL	RCH	CHI	KEN	DOV	KAN	CLT	TEX	PHO	HOM			85th	0^{1}	
2015	JR Motorsports	88	Chevy	DAY	ATL	LVS	PHO	CAL	TEX	BRI	RCH	TAL; 33	IOW		DOV; 5	MCH	CHI	DAY; 4	KEN	NHA	IND	IOW	GLN	MOH	BRI	ROA	DAR	RCH	CHI; 12	KEN	DOV	CLT; 12	KAN	TEX	PHO; 10	HOM			90th	0^{1}	
2015	JR Motorsports	5	Chevy											CLT; 3																									90th	0^{1}	
2016	JR Motorsports	5	Chevy	DAY; 3	ATL	LVS	PHO	CAL	TEX	BRI	RCH	TAL	DOV	CLT	POC	MCH	IOW	DAY	KEN	NHA	IND	IOW	GLN	MOH	BRI	ROA	DAR	RCH	CHI	KEN	DOV	CLT	KAN	TEX	PHO	HOM			98th	0^{1}	
2017	JR Motorsports	88	Chevy	DAY; 2	ATL	LVS	PHO	CAL	TEX	BRI	RCH	TAL; 15	CLT	DOV	POC	MCH	IOW	DAY	KEN	NHA	IND	IOW	GLN	MOH	BRI	ROA	DAR	RCH	CHI	KEN	DOV	CLT	KAN	TEX	PHO	HOM			97th	0^{1}	
2025	Richard Childress Racing	33	Chevy	DAY	ATL	COA	PHO	LVS	HOM	MAR	DAR	BRI	CAR; 14	TAL	TEX	CLT	NSH	MXC	POC	ATL	CSC	SON	DOV	IND	IOW	GLN	DAY	PIR	GTW	BRI	KAN	ROV	LVS	TAL	MAR	PHO			56th	23	

==== Truck Series ====
NASCAR Truck Series results
Year	Team	No.	Make	1	2	3	4	5	6	7	8	9	10	11	12	13	14	15	16	17	18	19	20	21	22	23	24	25	NTSC	Pts	Ref
2004	Ultra Motorsports	2	Dodge	DAY	ATL	MAR	MFD	CLT	DOV	TEX	MEM	MLW	KAN	KEN	GTW	MCH	IRP	NSH	BRI	RCH	NHA	LVS	CAL	TEX	MAR	PHO	DAR; 1*	HOM; 1*	47th	380	
2010	Kyle Busch Motorsports	18	Toyota	DAY	ATL	MAR	NSH	KAN	DOV	CLT	TEX	MCH	IOW	GTW	IRP	POC; 2	NSH	DAR	BRI	CHI	KEN	NHA	LVS	MAR	TAL	TEX	PHO	HOM	77th	175	
2011	Kyle Busch Motorsports	18	Toyota	DAY	PHO	DAR; 1*	MAR	NSH	DOV	CLT	KAN	TEX	KEN	IOW	NSH	IRP	POC	MCH	BRI	ATL	CHI	NHA	KEN	LVS	TAL	MAR	TEX	HOM	86th	0^{1}	
2012	Turner Motorsports	4	Chevy	DAY	MAR	CAR; 1	KAN	CLT	DOV	TEX	KEN	IOW	CHI	POC	MCH	BRI	ATL	IOW	KEN	LVS	TAL	MAR	TEX	PHO	HOM				80th	0^{1}	
2015	JR Motorsports	00	Chevy	DAY	ATL	MAR	KAN	**CLT**; 1	DOV	TEX	GTW	IOW	KEN	ELD	POC	MCH	BRI	MSP	CHI	NHA	LVS	TAL	MAR	TEX	PHO	HOM			84th	0^{1}	
2027	Spire Motorsports	77	Chevy	DAY	ATL	STP	DAR	BRI	TEX	KAN	NWS	CLT	NSS	POC	MCH	LRP	ATL	IRP	BRI	BGS	MSP	NHA	KAN	CLT	PHO	TAL	MAR	HOM			

^{*} Season still in progress
^{1} Ineligible for series points

=== ARCA Re/Max Series ===
(key) (Bold – Pole position awarded by qualifying time. Italics – Pole position earned by points standings or practice time. * – Most laps led.)

ARCA Re/Max Series results
Year	Team	No.	Make	1	2	3	4	5	6	7	8	9	10	11	12	13	14	15	16	17	18	19	20	21	22	ARSC	Pts	Ref
2002	Robert Yates Racing	98	Ford	DAY	ATL	NSH	SLM	KEN	CLT	KAN	POC	MCH	TOL	SBO	KEN	BLN	POC	NSH	ISF	WIN	DSF	CHI	SLM	TAL; 14	CLT	127th	160	

==== Camping World East Series ====
NASCAR Camping World East Series results
Year	Team	No.	Make	1	2	3	4	5	6	7	8	9	10	11	12	13	NCWEC	Pts	Ref
2008	Dave Davis Motorsports	9	Dodge	GRE	IOW; 2	SBO	GLN	NHA	TMP	NSH	ADI	LRP	MFD	NHA	DOV	STA	51st	175	

==== Whelen Modified Tour ====
NASCAR Whelen Modified Tour results
Year	Car owner	No.	Make	1	2	3	4	5	6	7	8	9	10	11	12	13	NWMTC	Pts	Ref
2009	John Holland	96	Chevy	TMP	STA	STA	NHA; 31	SPE	RIV	STA							45th	179	
2009	Alan Heinke	98	Chevy								BRI; 28	TMP	NHA	MAR	STA	TMP	45th	179	

=== Superstar Racing Experience ===
(key) * – Most laps led. ^{1} – Heat 1 winner. ^{2} – Heat 2 winner.

Superstar Racing Experience results
Year	No.	1	2	3	4	5	6	SRXC	Pts
2023	9	STA	STA II	MMS	BER; 11	ELD	LOS	23rd	0^{1}

Achievements
Preceded by Jimmie Johnson; Casey Mears; Kevin Harvick	Coca-Cola 600 Winner; 2006; 2008; 2012	Succeeded by Casey Mears; David Reutimann; Kevin Harvick
Preceded by Kyle Busch	Brickyard 400 Winner; 2017	Succeeded by Brad Keselowski
Awards
Preceded by Jamie McMurray	NASCAR Nextel Cup Series Rookie of the Year; 2004	Succeeded by Kyle Busch
