= Christian Elder =

American racing driver (1968–2007)

- Born: Christian Stuart Elder; December 6, 1968; Bloomington, Minnesota, U.S.
- Died: August 12, 2007 (aged 38); Cornelius, North Carolina, U.S.
- Cause of death: Methadone overdose

NASCAR O'Reilly Auto Parts Series career
- 24 races run over 2 years
- Best finish: 39th (2001)
- First race: 2001 Sam's Town 300 (Las Vegas)
- Last race: 2002 Stacker 2/GNC Live Well 250 (Daytona)
Wins	Top tens	Poles
0	0	0

Christian Stuart Elder (December 6, 1968 – August 12, 2007) was an American racing driver. He raced in the Busch Series for Akins Motorsports for two years. His best finish of the year was 26th at Kentucky.

Elder made his debut in 2001, running his first race at Las Vegas for Akins where he started the race in 32nd, and he finished 23rd. In sixteen starts, he managed two top-twenties (a pair of twentieths at Bristol and Dover). In 2002, Elder began running races for Akins full-time. A serious crash in qualifying at Chicagoland Speedway ended his Busch career.

Elder competed in the ARCA series, Star Mazda Series, Speed World Challenge Series, Busch Series and NASCAR Goody's Dash Series which Elder competed in and won races at Daytona and Lowe's Motor Speedway. He also had a pole position at Bristol Motor Speedway.

Contrary to popular belief, Elder was not related to legendary NASCAR crew chief Jake “Suitcase Jake” Elder.

== Qualifying crash ==
During qualifying for the 2002 Tropicana Twister 300 at Chicagoland Speedway, Elder lost control of his car at turns three and four, causing his car to shoot up the track and hit the wall extremely hard, slamming the car's right side past the windshield, badly wrinkling the whole side of the car. He suffered a concussion and a broken collar bone. Track rescue workers had to cut him out of the race car and Elder was transported to a nearby hospital. The crash ended his NASCAR career.

== Death ==
Elder died at his home in Cornelius, North Carolina, on Sunday, August 12, 2007, due to accidental methadone toxicity, caused by mixing up pills he was taking due to his accident. At the time of his death, Elder was a project manager for Elder-Jones, Inc. in Charlotte, North Carolina.

== Motorsports career results ==
=== NASCAR ===
(key) (Bold – Pole position awarded by qualifying time. Italics – Pole position earned by points standings or practice time. * – Most laps led.)

==== Busch Series ====
NASCAR Busch Series results
Year	Team	No.	Make	1	2	3	4	5	6	7	8	9	10	11	12	13	14	15	16	17	18	19	20	21	22	23	24	25	26	27	28	29	30	31	32	33	34	NBSC	Pts	Ref
2001	Akins Motorsports	38	Ford	DAY; DNQ	CAR	LVS; 23	ATL; 26	DAR	BRI; 20	TEX	NSH	TAL; 26	CAL; 24	RCH	NHA	NZH; 28	CLT; 37	DOV; 20	KEN; 24	MLW	GLN	CHI; 29	GTY; 30	PPR	IRP	MCH	BRI; 35	DAR	RCH	DOV	KAN; 27	CLT; 40	MEM	PHO; 28	CAR	HOM; 43		39th	1228	
2002	Akins Motorsports	38	Ford	DAY; 36	CAR; 37	LVS; 38	DAR	BRI	TEX; 31	NSH	TAL; 43	CAL; 43	RCH	NHA	NZH	CLT	DOV	NSH	KEN; 26	MLW	DAY; 29	CHI; INQ^{†}	GTY	PPR	IRP	MCH	BRI	DAR	RCH	DOV	KAN	CLT	MEM	ATL	CAR	PHO	HOM	58th	455	
^{†} - Qualified, but received career-ending injuries in a qualifying crash, and was replaced by Mark Green

==== Goody's Dash Series ====
NASCAR Goody's Dash Series results
Year	Team	No.	Make	1	2	3	4	5	6	7	8	9	10	11	12	13	14	15	16	17	18	19	20	21	NGDS	Pts	Ref
1995	N/A	23	Chevy	DAY	FLO	LAN	MYB	SUM	HCY	CAR	STH	BRI	SUM	GRE	BGS	MYB	NSV	FLO	NWS	VOL; 15	HCY	HOM; 36			N/A	0	
1996	Elder Racing	38	Pontiac	DAY	HOM; 21	MYB	SUM	NSV; 20	TRI	CAR	HCY	FLO; 28	BRI; DNQ	SUM	GRE	SNM	BGS	MYB; 33	LAN	STH	FLO	NWS; 31	VOL	HCY	44th	471	
1997	Elder-Jones Racing	21	Pontiac	DAY; 2	HOM; 20	KIN; 17	MYB; 26	LAN; 14	CAR; 13	TRI; 14	FLO; 3	HCY; 19	**BRI**; 17	GRE; 21	SNM	CLT; 1*	MYB; 23	LAN; 18	SUM			USA; 2	CON	HOM; 19	14th	2093	
1997	Elder-Jones Racing	12	Pontiac																	STA; 16	HCY				14th	2093	
1998	Elder-Jones Racing	21	Pontiac	DAY; 10	HCY; 18	CAR; 25	CLT; 8	TRI	LAN	BRI; 19	SUM	GRE	ROU	SNM	MYB	CON	HCY	LAN	STA	LOU	VOL	USA	HOM		35th	579	
1999	Elder-Jones Racing	21	Pontiac	DAY; 1*	HCY	CAR	CLT	BRI	LOU	SUM	GRE	ROU	STA	MYB	HCY	LAN	USA	JAC	LAN						N/A	0	
2000	Elder-Jones Racing	21	Pontiac	DAY; 21	MON	STA	JAC	CAR																	48th	212	
2000	N/A	16	Pontiac						CLT; 17	SBO	ROU	LOU	SUM	GRE	SNM	MYB	BRI	HCY	JAC	USA	LAN				48th	212	
2001	N/A	16	Pontiac	DAY; 29	ROU	DAR	CLT	LOU	JAC	KEN	SBO	DAY	GRE	SNM	NRV	MYB	BRI	ACE	JAC	USA	NSH				77th	76	

=== ARCA Bondo/Mar-Hyde Series ===
(key) (Bold – Pole position awarded by qualifying time. Italics – Pole position earned by points standings or practice time. * – Most laps led. ** – All laps led.)

ARCA Bondo/Mar-Hyde Series results
Year	Team	No.	Make	1	2	3	4	5	6	7	8	9	10	11	12	13	14	15	16	17	18	19	20	21	22	ABMHSC	Pts	Ref
1998	John Elder	14	Pontiac	DAY	ATL	SLM	CLT	MEM	MCH	POC	SBS	TOL	PPR	POC	KIL	FRS	ISF	ATL	DSF	SLM	TEX	WIN	CLT	TAL	ATL; 40	N/A	0	
1999	John Elder	14	Pontiac	DAY	ATL; 27	SLM	AND	CLT	MCH; 15	POC	TOL	SBS	BLN	POC; 28	KIL	FRS	FLM	ISF	WIN	DSF	SLM	CLT; 41	TAL	ATL; 15		54th	525	
2000	John Elder	14	Pontiac	DAY; DNQ	SLM	AND	CLT; 24	KIL	FRS	MCH; 37	POC	TOL	KEN	BLN	POC; 23	WIN	ISF	KEN	DSF	SLM	CLT	TAL; 15	ATL; 33			51st	520	
