= 2004 Pepsi 300 =

Seventh race of the 2004 NASCAR Busch Series

Race details
- Race 7 of 34 of the 2004 NASCAR Busch Series
- Date: April 10, 2004
- Official name: 4th Annual Pepsi 300
- Location: Nashville Superspeedway, Gladeville, Tennessee
- Course: Permanent racing facility
- Course length: 1.333 miles (2.145 km)
- Distance: 225 laps, 299.925 mi (482.682 km)
- Scheduled distance: 225 laps, 299.925 mi (482.682 km)

Pole position
| Driver | Martin Truex Jr. | Chance 2 Motorsports |
- Time: 28.819

Most laps led
| Driver | Clint Bowyer | Richard Childress Racing |
- Laps: 104

Winner
| No. 99 | Michael Waltrip | Michael Waltrip Racing |

Television in the United States
- Network: FX
- Announcers: Mike Joy, Larry McReynolds

Radio in the United States
- Radio: Motor Racing Network

The 2004 Pepsi 300 was the seventh stock car race of the 2004 NASCAR Busch Series and the fourth iteration of the event. The race was held on Saturday, April 10, 2004, in Gladeville, Tennessee at Nashville Superspeedway, a 1.333 miles (2.145 km) permanent D-shaped racetrack. The race took its scheduled 225 laps to complete. With two laps to go, the four leaders in the race, Kyle Busch, Clint Bowyer, Johnny Benson Jr., and Robby Gordon were involved in an accident when Bowyer tapped Busch exiting turn two. At the last second before the caution, then sixth-place driver, Michael Waltrip Racing driver Michael Waltrip, would pass then fifth-place driver, Brewco Motorsports driver Johnny Sauter, to take the lead when the caution was thrown by NASCAR. NASCAR would hand Waltrip the victory, and Sauter would earn second place. The win was Waltrip's 11th and to date, final career NASCAR Busch Series win and his only win of the season. To fill out the podium, Kasey Kahne, driving for Akins Motorsports, would finish third.

== Background ==
The layout of Nashville Superspeedway, the venue where the race was held.

Nashville Superspeedway is a motor racing complex located in Gladeville, Tennessee, United States (though the track has a Lebanon postal address), about 30 mi (48 km) southeast of Nashville. The track was built in 2001 and is currently hosting the Ally 400, a NASCAR Cup Series regular season event, the Tennessee Lottery 250, and the Rackley Roofing 200.

It is a concrete oval track 1 1/3 miles (2.145 km) long. Nashville Superspeedway is owned by Speedway Motorsports, which acquired the track's previous owner Dover Motorsports in December 2021. Nashville Superspeedway is the longest concrete oval in NASCAR. Current permanent seating capacity is approximately 25,000, but will reach up to 38,000 for the NASCAR Cup Series event in 2021. Additional portable seats are brought in for some events, and seating capacity can be expanded to 150,000. Infrastructure is in place to expand the facility to include a short track, drag strip, and road course.

=== Entry list ===
- (R) denotes rookie driver.

| # | Driver | Team | Make | Sponsor |
|---|---|---|---|---|
| 0 | Greg Sacks | Davis Motorsports | Chevrolet | Davis Motorsports |
| 00 | Jason Leffler | Haas CNC Racing | Chevrolet | Haas Automation |
| 1 | Johnny Benson Jr. | Phoenix Racing | Dodge | Miccosukee Resort & Gaming |
| 2 | Ron Hornaday Jr. | Richard Childress Racing | Chevrolet | ACDelco |
| 02 | Hermie Sadler | SCORE Motorsports | Chevrolet | The FanZCar |
| 4 | Mike Wallace | Biagi Brothers Racing | Ford | GEICO |
| 5 | Kyle Busch (R) | Hendrick Motorsports | Chevrolet | Lowe's, Pella |
| 8 | Martin Truex Jr. | Chance 2 Motorsports | Chevrolet | Taco Bell |
| 10 | Gus Wasson | Davis Motorsports | Chevrolet | Davis Motorsports |
| 12 | Tim Fedewa | FitzBradshaw Racing | Chevrolet | NBS 24/7 |
| 14 | Casey Atwood | FitzBradshaw Racing | Chevrolet | United States Navy |
| 16 | Justin Ashburn | Day Enterprises Racing | Chevrolet | 31-W Insulation, Spectra Metal Sales |
| 18 | J. J. Yeley (R) | Joe Gibbs Racing | Chevrolet | The Home Depot, Vigoro |
| 20 | Mike Bliss | Joe Gibbs Racing | Chevrolet | Rockwell Automation |
| 21 | Clint Bowyer (R) | Richard Childress Racing | Chevrolet | Reese's |
| 22 | Jason Keller | ppc Racing | Ford | ppc Racing |
| 23 | Kenny Wallace | Bill Davis Racing | Chevrolet | Stacker 2 |
| 24 | Mike Harmon | GIC–Mixon Motorsports | Chevrolet | GIC–Mixon Motorsports |
| 25 | Bobby Hamilton Jr. | Team Rensi Motorsports | Ford | United States Marine Corps |
| 27 | Johnny Sauter | Brewco Motorsports | Pontiac | Kleenex, Dollar General Market! |
| 30 | David Stremme | Braun Racing | Dodge | TrimSpa |
| 32 | Mike Garvey | Competitive Edge Motorsports | Chevrolet | Negotiations Seminar |
| 33 | Paul Menard (R) | Andy Petree Racing | Chevrolet | Menards, Pittsburgh Paint |
| 36 | Travis Geisler | DCT Motorsports | Chevrolet | DCT Motorsports |
| 37 | David Green | Brewco Motorsports | Chevrolet | Timber Wolf |
| 38 | Kasey Kahne | Akins Motorsports | Dodge | Great Clips |
| 39 | Andy Ponstein | Jay Robinson Racing | Ford | Yahoo! |
| 43 | Aaron Fike | Curb Agajanian Motorsports | Dodge | Ollie's Bargain Outlet |
| 46 | Ashton Lewis Jr. | Lewis Motorsports | Chevrolet | Lewis Motorsports "Advertise Here!!!" |
| 47 | Robert Pressley | ST Motorsports | Ford | Clorox, Dollar General |
| 49 | Derrike Cope | Jay Robinson Racing | Ford | Advil |
| 50 | David Starr | Holigan Racing | Chevrolet | Enzyte |
| 51 | Stan Boyd (R) | Ware Racing Enterprises | Dodge | TheKobra.com |
| 53 | Brad Teague | Tennessee Mountain Boys Racing | Chevrolet | Tennessee Mountain Boys Racing |
| 55 | Robby Gordon | Robby Gordon Motorsports | Chevrolet | Fruit of the Loom |
| 56 | Regan Smith | Mac Hill Motorsports | Chevrolet | Mac Hill Motorsports |
| 59 | Stacy Compton | ST Motorsports | Ford | Kingsford, Dollar General |
| 60 | Greg Biffle | Roush Racing | Ford | Charter Communications |
| 63 | Shane Wallace | Shane Wallace Motorsports | Chevrolet | Speed Racer |
| 72 | Randy MacDonald | MacDonald Motorsports | Chevrolet | MacDonald Motorsports |
| 74 | Tony Raines | BACE Motorsports | Chevrolet | BACE Motorsports |
| 75 | Jay Sauter | Henderson Motorsports | Chevrolet | Food Country USA, Lay's |
| 77 | Chad Chaffin | Moy Racing | Ford | BG Products |
| 84 | Norm Benning | Norm Benning Racing | Chevrolet | Norm Benning Racing |
| 85 | Brad Baker | Premier Motorsports | Chevrolet | Premier Glass |
| 87 | David Reutimann | NEMCO Motorsports | Chevrolet | Natural Gear |
| 88 | Jeff Fuller | NEMCO Motorsports | Chevrolet | NEMCO Motorsports |
| 89 | Morgan Shepherd | Shepherd Racing Ventures | Ford | Racing with Jesus |
| 91 | Stanton Barrett | Stanton Barrett Motorsports | Pontiac | Stanton Barrett Motorsports |
| 94 | Eddie Beahr | Beahr Racing Enterprises | Dodge | Beahr Racing Enterprises |
| 95 | David Keith | Sadler Brothers Racing | Chevrolet | Sadler Brothers Racing |
| 96 | Caleb Holman | Ortec Racing | Chevrolet | Ortec Racing |
| 97 | Jimmy Kitchens | Stanton Barrett Motorsports | Chevrolet | Stanton Barrett Motorsports |
| 99 | Michael Waltrip | Michael Waltrip Racing | Chevrolet | Aaron's |
Official entry list

== Practice ==
=== First practice ===
The first practice session was held on Friday, April 9, at 12:00 PM CST. The session would last for two hours. David Green, driving for Brewco Motorsports, would set the fastest time in the session, with a lap of 28.985 and an average speed of 165.561 miles per hour (266.445 km/h).

| Pos. | # | Driver | Team | Make | Time | Speed |
|---|---|---|---|---|---|---|
| 1 | 37 | David Green | Brewco Motorsports | Chevrolet | 28.985 | 165.561 |
| 2 | 25 | Bobby Hamilton Jr. | Team Rensi Motorsports | Ford | 29.003 | 165.459 |
| 3 | 8 | Martin Truex Jr. | Chance 2 Motorsports | Chevrolet | 29.040 | 165.248 |
Full first practice results

=== Second and final practice ===
The final practice session, sometimes referred to as Happy Hour, was held on Friday, April 9, at 6:15 PM CST. The session would last for one hour. Martin Truex Jr., driving for Chance 2 Motorsports, would set the fastest time in the session, with a lap of 29.452 and an average speed of 162.936 miles per hour (262.220 km/h).

During the session, Martin Truex Jr. would crash along with Jeff Fuller, forcing Truex Jr. to go to a backup car and to start at the rear for the race.

| Pos. | # | Driver | Team | Make | Time | Speed |
|---|---|---|---|---|---|---|
| 1 | 8 | Martin Truex Jr. | Chance 2 Motorsports | Chevrolet | 29.452 | 162.936 |
| 2 | 55 | Robby Gordon | Robby Gordon Motorsports | Chevrolet | 29.619 | 162.018 |
| 3 | 25 | Bobby Hamilton Jr. | Team Rensi Motorsports | Ford | 29.619 | 162.018 |
Full Happy Hour practice results

== Qualifying ==
Qualifying was held on Friday, April 9, at 3:35 PM CST. Each driver would have two laps to set a fastest time; the fastest of the two would count as their official qualifying lap. Positions 1-38 would be decided on time, while positions 39-43 would be based on provisionals. Four spots are awarded by the use of provisionals based on owner's points. The fifth is awarded to a past champion who has not otherwise qualified for the race. If no past champion needs the provisional, the next team in the owner points will be awarded a provisional.

Martin Truex Jr., driving for Chance 2 Motorsports, would win the pole, setting a time of 28.819 and an average speed of 166.515 miles per hour (267.980 km/h).

11 drivers would fail to qualify: Shane Wallace, Stan Boyd, Justin Ashburn, Chad Chaffin, Mike Harmon, Greg Sacks, Morgan Shepherd, Jimmy Kitchens, Eddie Beahr, Norm Benning, and Brad Baker.

=== Full qualifying results ===
| Pos. | # | Driver | Team | Make | Time | Speed |
|---|---|---|---|---|---|---|
| 1 | 8 | Martin Truex Jr. | Chance 2 Motorsports | Chevrolet | 28.819 | 166.515 |
| 2 | 1 | Johnny Benson Jr. | Phoenix Racing | Dodge | 28.826 | 166.475 |
| 3 | 25 | Bobby Hamilton Jr. | Team Rensi Motorsports | Ford | 28.966 | 165.670 |
| 4 | 22 | Jason Keller | ppc Racing | Ford | 28.995 | 165.504 |
| 5 | 27 | Johnny Sauter | Brewco Motorsports | Pontiac | 29.006 | 165.442 |
| 6 | 38 | Kasey Kahne | Akins Motorsports | Dodge | 29.021 | 165.356 |
| 7 | 59 | Stacy Compton | ST Motorsports | Ford | 29.054 | 165.168 |
| 8 | 00 | Jason Leffler | Haas CNC Racing | Chevrolet | 29.084 | 164.998 |
| 9 | 20 | Mike Bliss | Joe Gibbs Racing | Chevrolet | 29.097 | 164.924 |
| 10 | 37 | David Green | Brewco Motorsports | Chevrolet | 29.126 | 164.760 |
| 11 | 55 | Robby Gordon | Robby Gordon Motorsports | Chevrolet | 29.133 | 164.720 |
| 12 | 5 | Kyle Busch (R) | Hendrick Motorsports | Chevrolet | 29.144 | 164.658 |
| 13 | 46 | Ashton Lewis Jr. | Lewis Motorsports | Chevrolet | 29.165 | 164.540 |
| 14 | 30 | David Stremme | Braun Racing | Dodge | 29.232 | 164.163 |
| 15 | 87 | David Reutimann | NEMCO Motorsports | Chevrolet | 29.239 | 164.123 |
| 16 | 60 | Greg Biffle | Roush Racing | Ford | 29.240 | 164.118 |
| 17 | 12 | Tim Fedewa | FitzBradshaw Racing | Chevrolet | 29.290 | 163.837 |
| 18 | 23 | Kenny Wallace | Bill Davis Racing | Chevrolet | 29.300 | 163.782 |
| 19 | 21 | Clint Bowyer (R) | Richard Childress Racing | Chevrolet | 29.310 | 163.726 |
| 20 | 43 | Aaron Fike | Curb Agajanian Motorsports | Dodge | 29.331 | 163.609 |
| 21 | 74 | Tony Raines | BACE Motorsports | Chevrolet | 29.338 | 163.569 |
| 22 | 99 | Michael Waltrip | Michael Waltrip Racing | Chevrolet | 29.391 | 163.275 |
| 23 | 36 | Travis Geisler | DCT Motorsports | Chevrolet | 29.395 | 163.252 |
| 24 | 33 | Paul Menard (R) | Andy Petree Racing | Chevrolet | 29.396 | 163.247 |
| 25 | 18 | J. J. Yeley (R) | Joe Gibbs Racing | Chevrolet | 29.460 | 162.892 |
| 26 | 47 | Robert Pressley | ST Motorsports | Ford | 29.518 | 162.572 |
| 27 | 14 | Casey Atwood | FitzBradshaw Racing | Chevrolet | 29.529 | 162.511 |
| 28 | 2 | Ron Hornaday Jr. | Richard Childress Racing | Chevrolet | 29.589 | 162.182 |
| 29 | 50 | David Starr | Holigan Racing | Chevrolet | 29.711 | 161.516 |
| 30 | 4 | Mike Wallace | Biagi Brothers Racing | Ford | 29.717 | 161.483 |
| 31 | 88 | Jeff Fuller | NEMCO Motorsports | Chevrolet | 29.724 | 161.445 |
| 32 | 91 | Stanton Barrett | Stanton Barrett Motorsports | Chevrolet | 29.765 | 161.223 |
| 33 | 02 | Hermie Sadler | SCORE Motorsports | Chevrolet | 29.802 | 161.023 |
| 34 | 56 | Regan Smith | Mac Hill Motorsports | Chevrolet | 29.868 | 160.667 |
| 35 | 32 | Mike Garvey | Competitive Edge Motorsports | Chevrolet | 29.871 | 160.651 |
| 36 | 75 | Jay Sauter | Henderson Motorsports | Chevrolet | 29.878 | 160.613 |
| 37 | 95 | David Keith | Sadler Brothers Racing | Chevrolet | 29.898 | 160.506 |
| 38 | 53 | Brad Teague | Tennessee Mountain Boys Racing | Chevrolet | 29.975 | 160.093 |
Provisionals
| 39 | 49 | Derrike Cope | Jay Robinson Racing | Ford | 30.740 | 156.109 |
| 40 | 96 | Caleb Holman | Ortec Racing | Chevrolet | 30.666 | 156.486 |
| 41 | 10 | Gus Wasson | Davis Motorsports | Chevrolet | 30.198 | 158.911 |
| 42 | 72 | Randy MacDonald | MacDonald Motorsports | Chevrolet | 30.095 | 159.455 |
| 43 | 39 | Andy Ponstein | Jay Robinson Racing | Ford | 30.592 | 156.865 |
Failed to qualify
| 44 | 63 | Shane Wallace | Shane Wallace Motorsports | Chevrolet | 30.148 | 159.175 |
| 45 | 51 | Stan Boyd (R) | Ware Racing Enterprises | Dodge | 30.167 | 159.074 |
| 46 | 16 | Justin Ashburn | Day Enterprises Racing | Chevrolet | 30.167 | 159.074 |
| 47 | 77 | Chad Chaffin | Moy Racing | Ford | 30.180 | 159.006 |
| 48 | 24 | Mike Harmon | GIC–Mixon Motorsports | Chevrolet | 30.323 | 158.256 |
| 49 | 0 | Greg Sacks | Davis Motorsports | Chevrolet | 30.388 | 157.918 |
| 50 | 89 | Morgan Shepherd | Shepherd Racing Ventures | Ford | 30.443 | 157.632 |
| 51 | 97 | Jimmy Kitchens | Stanton Barrett Motorsports | Chevrolet | 30.538 | 157.142 |
| 52 | 94 | Eddie Beahr | Beahr Racing Enterprises | Dodge | 31.187 | 153.872 |
| 53 | 84 | Norm Benning | Norm Benning Racing | Chevrolet | 32.133 | 149.342 |
| 54 | 85 | Brad Baker | Premier Motorsports | Chevrolet | 34.252 | 140.103 |
Official qualifying results

== Race results ==
| Fin | St | # | Driver | Team | Make | Laps | Led | Status | Pts | Winnings |
|---|---|---|---|---|---|---|---|---|---|---|
| 1 | 22 | 99 | Michael Waltrip | Michael Waltrip Racing | Chevrolet | 225 | 2 | running | 185 | $36,875 |
| 2 | 5 | 27 | Johnny Sauter | Brewco Motorsports | Pontiac | 225 | 0 | running | 170 | $34,985 |
| 3 | 6 | 38 | Kasey Kahne | Akins Motorsports | Dodge | 225 | 17 | running | 170 | $24,155 |
| 4 | 19 | 21 | Clint Bowyer (R) | Richard Childress Racing | Chevrolet | 225 | 104 | running | 170 | $32,030 |
| 5 | 11 | 55 | Robby Gordon | Robby Gordon Motorsports | Chevrolet | 225 | 9 | running | 160 | $17,595 |
| 6 | 12 | 5 | Kyle Busch (R) | Hendrick Motorsports | Chevrolet | 225 | 6 | running | 155 | $30,425 |
| 23 | 1 | 8 | Martin Truex Jr. | Chance 2 Motorsports | Chevrolet | 219 | 0 | running | 94 | $28,105 |
| 7 | 2 | 1 | Johnny Benson Jr. | Phoenix Racing | Dodge | 225 | 9 | running | 151 | $21,505 |
| 27 | 3 | 25 | Bobby Hamilton Jr. | Team Rensi Motorsports | Ford | 214 | 78 | running | 87 | $19,630 |
| 9 | 8 | 00 | Jason Leffler | Haas CNC Racing | Chevrolet | 224 | 0 | running | 138 | $26,155 |
| 10 | 10 | 37 | David Green | Brewco Motorsports | Chevrolet | 223 | 0 | running | 134 | $18,280 |
| 11 | 26 | 47 | Robert Pressley | ST Motorsports | Ford | 223 | 0 | running | 130 | $18,205 |
| 12 | 17 | 12 | Tim Fedewa | FitzBradshaw Racing | Chevrolet | 223 | 0 | running | 127 | $23,960 |
| 8 | 9 | 20 | Mike Bliss | Joe Gibbs Racing | Chevrolet | 225 | 0 | running | 142 | $18,055 |
| 13 | 4 | 22 | Jason Keller | ppc Racing | Ford | 223 | 0 | running | 124 | $15,330 |
| 14 | 7 | 59 | Stacy Compton | ST Motorsports | Ford | 222 | 0 | running | 121 | $17,905 |
| 15 | 21 | 74 | Tony Raines | BACE Motorsports | Chevrolet | 222 | 0 | running | 118 | $12,630 |
| 16 | 24 | 33 | Paul Menard (R) | Andy Petree Racing | Chevrolet | 222 | 0 | running | 115 | $16,575 |
| 17 | 34 | 56 | Regan Smith | Mac Hill Motorsports | Chevrolet | 222 | 0 | running | 112 | $12,480 |
| 18 | 18 | 23 | Kenny Wallace | Bill Davis Racing | Chevrolet | 222 | 0 | running | 109 | $16,900 |
| 19 | 25 | 18 | J. J. Yeley (R) | Joe Gibbs Racing | Chevrolet | 222 | 0 | running | 106 | $16,700 |
| 20 | 27 | 14 | Casey Atwood | FitzBradshaw Racing | Chevrolet | 221 | 0 | running | 103 | $16,360 |
| 21 | 13 | 46 | Ashton Lewis Jr. | Lewis Motorsports | Chevrolet | 220 | 0 | running | 100 | $18,855 |
| 22 | 33 | 02 | Hermie Sadler | SCORE Motorsports | Chevrolet | 220 | 0 | running | 97 | $14,270 |
| 24 | 23 | 36 | Travis Geisler | DCT Motorsports | Chevrolet | 219 | 0 | running | 91 | $12,325 |
| 25 | 15 | 87 | David Reutimann | NEMCO Motorsports | Chevrolet | 218 | 0 | running | 88 | $12,190 |
| 26 | 35 | 32 | Mike Garvey | Competitive Edge Motorsports | Chevrolet | 216 | 0 | running | 85 | $21,675 |
| 28 | 40 | 96 | Caleb Holman | Ortec Racing | Chevrolet | 212 | 0 | running | 79 | $14,125 |
| 29 | 29 | 50 | David Starr | Holigan Racing | Chevrolet | 210 | 0 | running | 76 | $12,085 |
| 30 | 42 | 72 | Randy MacDonald | MacDonald Motorsports | Chevrolet | 210 | 0 | running | 73 | $12,120 |
| 31 | 28 | 2 | Ron Hornaday Jr. | Richard Childress Racing | Chevrolet | 201 | 0 | running | 70 | $21,500 |
| 32 | 14 | 30 | David Stremme | Braun Racing | Dodge | 200 | 0 | overheating | 67 | $15,980 |
| 33 | 41 | 10 | Gus Wasson | Davis Motorsports | Chevrolet | 187 | 0 | engine | 64 | $21,460 |
| 34 | 43 | 39 | Andy Ponstein | Jay Robinson Racing | Ford | 145 | 0 | too slow | 61 | $11,915 |
| 35 | 39 | 49 | Derrike Cope | Jay Robinson Racing | Ford | 100 | 0 | brakes | 58 | $15,915 |
| 36 | 36 | 75 | Jay Sauter | Henderson Motorsports | Chevrolet | 98 | 0 | ignition | 55 | $11,875 |
| 37 | 31 | 88 | Jeff Fuller | NEMCO Motorsports | Chevrolet | 68 | 0 | vibration | 52 | $17,345 |
| 38 | 30 | 4 | Mike Wallace | Biagi Brothers Racing | Ford | 55 | 0 | crash | 49 | $13,810 |
| 39 | 20 | 43 | Aaron Fike | Curb Agajanian Motorsports | Dodge | 53 | 0 | crash | 46 | $11,790 |
| 40 | 16 | 60 | Greg Biffle | Roush Racing | Ford | 24 | 0 | engine | 43 | $11,770 |
| 41 | 32 | 91 | Stanton Barrett | Stanton Barrett Motorsports | Chevrolet | 21 | 0 | handling | 40 | $11,750 |
| 42 | 38 | 53 | Brad Teague | Tennessee Mountain Boys Racing | Chevrolet | 3 | 0 | engine | 37 | $11,730 |
| 43 | 37 | 95 | David Keith | Sadler Brothers Racing | Chevrolet | 2 | 0 | clutch | 34 | $11,676 |
Failed to qualify
| 44 | | 63 | Shane Wallace | Shane Wallace Motorsports | Chevrolet | | | | | |
| 45 | | 51 | Stan Boyd (R) | Ware Racing Enterprises | Dodge | | | | | |
| 46 | | 16 | Justin Ashburn | Day Enterprises Racing | Chevrolet | | | | | |
| 47 | | 77 | Chad Chaffin | Moy Racing | Ford | | | | | |
| 48 | | 24 | Mike Harmon | GIC–Mixon Motorsports | Chevrolet | | | | | |
| 49 | | 0 | Greg Sacks | Davis Motorsports | Chevrolet | | | | | |
| 50 | | 89 | Morgan Shepherd | Shepherd Racing Ventures | Ford | | | | | |
| 51 | | 97 | Jimmy Kitchens | Stanton Barrett Motorsports | Chevrolet | | | | | |
| 52 | | 94 | Eddie Beahr | Beahr Racing Enterprises | Dodge | | | | | |
| 53 | | 84 | Norm Benning | Norm Benning Racing | Chevrolet | | | | | |
| 54 | | 85 | Brad Baker | Premier Motorsports | Chevrolet | | | | | |
Official race results

== Standings after the race ==
Drivers' Championship standings

| | Pos | Driver | Points |
|---|---|---|---|
| 2 | 1 | Michael Waltrip | 1,033 |
| 1 | 2 | David Green | 1,025 (-8) |
| 1 | 3 | Kyle Busch | 972 (-61) |
| 2 | 4 | Martin Truex Jr. | 968 (–65) |
| | 5 | Robby Gordon | 962 (–71) |
| | 6 | Jason Keller | 924 (–109) |
| 2 | 7 | Johnny Sauter | 913 (–120) |
| | 8 | Bobby Hamilton Jr. | 870 (–163) |
| 2 | 9 | Tim Fedewa | 862 (–171) |
| 5 | 10 | Johnny Benson Jr. | 829 (–204) |
Official driver's standings

- Note: Only the first 10 positions are included for the driver standings.

| Previous race: 2004 O'Reilly 300 | NASCAR Busch Series; 2004 season | Next race: 2004 Aaron's 312 (Talladega) |
