= Keith Coleman Racing =

Former NASCAR team

- Owner: Keith Coleman
- Base: Eddyville, Kentucky
- Series: Busch Series
- Race drivers: Kim Crosby, Brad Keselowski, Shawna Robinson, Mark Green, Jennifer Jo Cobb, Brian Keselowski, Carl Long, Eddie Troconis, Chris Wimmer, Marc Mitchell, Stan Boyd
- Manufacturer: Chevrolet
- Opened: 2004
- Closed: 2007

Career
- Drivers' Championships: 0

Keith Coleman Racing was a NASCAR Busch Series team. It fielded the No. 23 and No. 26 cars for three seasons. The team was formed in 2004 by New Orleans native Keith Coleman and at the time bought the team's equipment from Holigan Racing and later from Bill Davis Racing.

KCR debuted in 2004 at the Mr. Goodcents 300 as the No. 26 LoveFifi.com Chevrolet Monte Carlo. Driver Mark Green qualified 26th and finished 34th in the race after suffering engine failure. He would run four more races that year for KCR, his best finish being a 23rd at Atlanta Motor Speedway. In the season-closing Ford 300, Green failed to qualify the No. 26, but KCR was able to get an entry in, the No. 50 Vassarette machine piloted by Jennifer Jo Cobb. Cobb crashed on the third lap of the race.

Despite her accident at Homestead, Cobb signed up to run the full 2005 Busch Series year with Coleman in the No. 26. NASCAR did not approve of her running at all tracks. Coleman originally asked Christi Passmore to fill in for Cobb in the races NASCAR did not allow Cobb to run, but that fell apart. Because Vassarette insisted that they would only sponsor a car with a woman behind the wheel, KCR selected Shawna Robinson as the team's driver for the full season. When she did not finish higher than 27th, Coleman removed her from the car, and she and Vassarette left the team during the summer. Mark Green returned to the No. 23, with BMAR joining as sponsor. He ran 16 races that year with KCR, his best finish being an 11th at Talladega. Meanwhile, KCR began operating a second car, the No. 26, in addition to the No. 23.

In June 2005, it was announced that Kim Crosby would drive the new car part-time, with Boudreaux's Butt Paste and Vassarette as sponsors. Crosby finished 28th in her KCR debut at the Winn-Dixie 250, and then 39th a few weeks later at Pikes Peak. Due to lack of team performance, Crosby left the team towards the end of the season. In 2006, Chris Wimmer began the season the No. 23 car, but was released after the Pepsi 300. Marc Mitchell took over at Phoenix, but crashed during practice, forcing the team to miss the race. Carl Long drove the car beginning at the Federated Auto Parts 300 and had a best finish of 34th before he was released, and Brad Keselowski finished the season with the team with Ridley Motorcycles coming on board as sponsor. Eduardo Troconis attempted the race at Watkins Glen International, but failed to qualify. Keselowski was to drive the car full-time in 2007 with the Oklahoma Centennial Commission serving as the team's original primary sponsor, before Mactac Graphics became the team's new primary sponsor midway through the year. In July 2007, the team suspended operations, due to health problems from Coleman. The team officially closed later in the month. An auction was held in 2007 to liquidate the assets of the team.

== Car No. 23 results ==
Year	Driver	No.	Make	1	2	3	4	5	6	7	8	9	10	11	12	13	14	15	16	17	18	19	20	21	22	23	24	25	26	27	28	29	30	31	32	33	34	35	Owners	Pts
2004	Jennifer Jo Cobb	50	Chevy	DAY	CAR	LVS	DAR	BRI	TEX	NSH	TAL	CAL	GTY	RCH	NZH	CLT	DOV	NSH	KEN	MLW	DAY	CHI	NHA	PPR	IRP	MCH	BRI	CAL	RCH	DOV	KAN	CLT	MEM	ATL	PHO	DAR	HOM; 43		105th	34
2005	Shawna Robinson	23	Chevy	DAY; 27	CAL; 35	MXC; 30	LVS; 31	ATL; 36	NSH; DNQ	BRI; 39	TEX; DNQ																												36th	1989
2005	Mark Green	23	Chevy									PHO; 22	TAL; 11	DAR; 22	RCH; 22	CLT; 25	DOV; 32	NSH; 41	KEN; 33	MLW; 28	DAY; DNQ	CHI; DNQ	NHA; 27	PPR; 20	GTY; 38	IRP; 21	GLN; DNQ	MCH; 33	BRI; 28	CAL; DNQ	RCH; DNQ	DOV; 41	KAN; DNQ	CLT; DNQ	MEM; DNQ				36th	1989
2005	Chris Wimmer	23	Chevy																																	TEX; DNQ	PHO; 37	HOM; DNQ	36th	1989
2006	Chris Wimmer	23	Chevy	DAY; DNQ	CAL; DNQ	MXC; DNQ	LVS; DNQ	ATL; DNQ	BRI; 39	TEX; DNQ	NSH; 40																												49th	993
2006	Marc Mitchell	23	Chevy									PHO; DNQ	TAL	RCH	DAR	CLT	DOV																						49th	993
2006	Carl Long	23	Chevy															NSH; 41				CHI; DNQ	NHA; 38	MAR; 41	GTY; 34	IRP													49th	993
2006	Stan Boyd	23	Chevy																KEN; DNQ	MLW	DAY																		49th	993
2006	Eduardo Troconis	23	Chevy																								GLN; DNQ	MCH											49th	993
2006	Brad Keselowski	23	Chevy																										BRI; DNQ	CAL; 37	RCH; 38	DOV	KAN; 26	CLT; 34	MEM; 41	TEX; 29		HOM; 39	49th	993
2006	Brian Keselowski	23	Chevy																																		PHO; 43		49th	993
2007	Brad Keselowski	23	Chevy	DAY; DNQ	CAL; 32	MXC; 43	LVS; 34	ATL; 25	BRI; 41	NSH; 38	TEX; 43	PHO; 32	TAL	RCH; 35	DAR; 36	CLT; 37	DOV; 24	NSH; 40	KEN	MLW	NHA	DAY	CHI	GTY	IRP	CGV	GLN	MCH	BRI	CAL	RCH	DOV	KAN	CLT	MEM	TEX	PHO	HOM	49th	758

== Car No. 26 results ==
Year	Driver	No.	Make	1	2	3	4	5	6	7	8	9	10	11	12	13	14	15	16	17	18	19	20	21	22	23	24	25	26	27	28	29	30	31	32	33	34	35	Owners	Pts
2004	Mark Green	26	Chevy	DAY	CAR	LVS	DAR	BRI	TEX	NSH	TAL	CAL	GTY	RCH	NZH	CLT	DOV	NSH	KEN	MLW	DAY	CHI	NHA	PPR	IRP	MCH	BRI	CAL	RCH	DOV	KAN; 34	CLT; 24	MEM; 34	ATL; 23	PHO; 33	DAR	HOM; DNQ		61st	399
2005	Mark Green	26	Chevy	DAY; DNQ	CAL	MXC	LVS	ATL	NSH	BRI	TEX	PHO	TAL	DAR	RCH	CLT	DOV	NSH	KEN	MLW																			63rd	288
2005	Kim Crosby	26	Chevy																		DAY; 28	CHI; DNQ	NHA; DNQ	PPR; 39	GTY; DNQ	IRP; DNQ	GLN; DNQ	MCH; DNQ	BRI	CAL; DNQ	RCH	DOV	KAN; DNQ	CLT; DNQ	MEM	TEX	PHO	HOM	63rd	288
2006	Joey McCarthy	26	Chevy	DAY	CAL	MXC	LVS	ATL	BRI	TEX	NSH	PHO	TAL	RCH	DAR	CLT	DOV	NSH	KEN	MLW	DAY	CHI	NHA; 43	MAR	GTY														91st	34
2006	Carl Long	26	Chevy																							IRP; 43	GLN	MCH	BRI	CAL	RCH	DOV	KAN	CLT	MEM	TEX	PHO	HOM	91st	34
