= Troconis =

Troconis is a surname. Notable people with the surname include:

- Eddie Troconis (born 1979), Mexican racing driver
- Francisco de Paula Andrade Troconis (1840–1915), Venezuelan engineer and journalist
