= Rhea Fain =

NASCAR Busch Series team owner

Rhea Fain was a NASCAR Busch Series team owner. A controversial figure in the sport, he was very well regarded by racers, and many of his team for more than a handful of races. Three of his TV scripts were bought out to be aired. This is when he sold his race team. He wanted to dedicate more to his film career

== Involvement with Morgan Shepherd ==
In May 1999, Fain partnered with Morgan Shepherd to field the No. 05 Wendy's Pontiac. The team failed to qualify for the Coca-Cola 600 and the partnership dissolved.

== Black Cat Racing ==
Black Cat Racing was one of Fain's teams. Conrad Burr was the driver of the No. 13 entry in 2004.

They were to run Kim Crosby in the No. 28 Boudreaux's Butt Paste Pontiac but she pulled out after Speedweeks. The team was a collaboration with Drew White of White Motorsports.
