= 2010 Daytona 500 =

Auto race held in 2010

Race details
- Race 1 of 36 in the 2010 NASCAR Sprint Cup Series
- Date: February 14, 2010
- Location: Daytona International Speedway; Daytona Beach, Florida, U.S.
- Course: Permanent racing facility 2.5 mi (4.023 km)
- Distance: 208 laps, 520 mi (836.858 km)
- Scheduled distance: 200 laps, 500 mi (804.672 km)
- Weather: Cold with temperatures reaching up to 55 °F (13 °C); wind speeds up to 8 miles per hour (13 km/h)
- Average speed: 137.284 miles per hour (220.937 km/h)

Pole position
| Driver | Mark Martin | Hendrick Motorsports |
- Time: 47.074

Qualifying race winners
| Duel 1 Winner | Jimmie Johnson | Hendrick Motorsports |
| Duel 2 Winner | Kasey Kahne | Richard Petty Motorsports |

Most laps led
| Driver | Kevin Harvick | Richard Childress Racing |
- Laps: 41

Winner
| No. 1 | Jamie McMurray | Earnhardt Ganassi Racing |

Television in the United States
- Network: Fox Broadcasting Company
- Announcers: Mike Joy, Darrell Waltrip, Larry McReynolds
- Nielsen ratings: 7.7/16 (Final); 13.294 million viewers

The 2010 Daytona 500 was the first stock car race of the 2010 NASCAR Sprint Cup Series. The 52nd Daytona 500, it was held on February 14, 2010, in Daytona Beach, Florida, at Daytona International Speedway, before a crowd of about 175,000 attendees. Earnhardt Ganassi Racing's Jamie McMurray won the 208-lap race from 13th place. Dale Earnhardt Jr. of Hendrick Motorsports finished in second, and Roush Fenway Racing's Greg Biffle was third.

Mark Martin, the event's oldest pole position winner at 51 years and 27 days, led the first four laps before Kasey Kahne passed him on lap five. Martin reclaimed the lead two laps later. The lead changed 52 times between a then-record-breaking 21 different drivers during the race, with Kevin Harvick leading the most laps (41). It was twice stopped because a large pothole developed between turns one and two, due to moisture, cold weather, and heavy cars scraping the tarmac surface as they ran low to the ground for better aerodynamic efficiency. Harvick led on the 206th lap, until McMurray passed him for his first Daytona 500 victory, and the fourth of his career.

Because this was the first race of the season, McMurray led the Drivers' Championship with 195 points, followed by Earnhardt in second place who had 175 points and Biffle in third with 170 points. Clint Bowyer and Harvick were fourth and fifth with 165 and 155 points, respectively. In the Manufacturers' Championship, Chevrolet led with nine points, ahead of Ford with six points. Toyota with four points, and Dodge with three points with thirty-five races left in the season.

== Background ==
Daytona International Speedway, where the race was held

The 2010 Daytona 500 was the 1st of the 36 stock car races in the 2010 NASCAR Sprint Cup Series, and the 52nd edition of the event. It was held on February 14, 2010, in Daytona Beach, Florida, at Daytona International Speedway, The layout used for the Daytona 500 is a four-turn, 2.5-mile (4.0 km) superspeedway. Daytona's turns are banked at 31 degrees, and the front stretch—the location of the finish line—is banked at 18 degrees. A total of 54 cars from 30 different teams were entered for the race.

NASCAR founder Bill France Sr. conceived the Daytona 500, which was first held in 1959; it is the successor to shorter races held on beaches in Daytona Beach. The race has been the opening round of the NASCAR season since 1982, and from 1988, it is one of four events that require cars to run restrictor plates. The Daytona 500 offers the most prize money of any American auto race. Winning the race is considered equal to winning either the World Series, the Super Bowl or The Masters.

For the 2010 race, NASCAR announced that it would stop policing bump drafting after responding to a growing resentment from its fan-base and drivers about the lack of on-track aggression and emotion. It came as the organization gradually controlled, and ultimately outright prohibited, bump drafting at the 2009 AMP Energy 500. Furthermore, NASCAR kept the yellow-marked out-of-bounds line at the bottom of race circuits because drivers opposed its removal. Furthermore, the four restrictor plate opening were expanded to their greatest size since the 1989 Daytona 500 of 63/64-inches for greater horsepower. NASCAR's vice-president of competition Robin Pemberton said that the changes would give control back to the drivers, "'Boys, have at it' and have a good time." NASCAR later changed the green–white–checkered finish rule to allow for a maximum of three (not one) attempts to end the race if it would otherwise conclude under caution.

Following an investigation of the circuit's safety barriers and a collision that sent Roush Fenway Racing's Carl Edwards into the catchfence at the 2009 Aaron's 499, track workers raised the height of the Daytona International Speedway catchfences from 14 ft (4.3 m) to 22 ft (6.7 m). The cost was not stated, and the work was completed in mid-January 2010. An spokesperson for the track's owner and operator International Speedway Corporation said, "Whenever we have an incident that impacts any of our systems, we take that opportunity to more closely scrutinize it and look at it across the company. Whatever we learn in these analyses, we'll look and see where it can be applied to other tracks. The challenge is each track is different in terms of banking and speed, so our primary focus right now was on Talladega and Daytona."

== Practice and qualifier ==
Six practice sessions were scheduled before the race on February 14. The first two, on February 5, were scheduled to run 80 and 90 minutes, respectively. The next two, on February 10, lasted 90 and 50 minutes, respectively. A steady day-long rain shower cancelled the February 12 60-minute session. The final session on February 13 lasted 85 minutes. Dale Earnhardt Jr. led the first practice session on Friday, February 5, which was truncated to an hour due to a thunderstorm from Central Florida, with a lap of 47.770 seconds, followed by Hendrick Motorsports teammates Mark Martin and Jeff Gordon in second and third. Bill Elliott, Robby Gordon, Ryan Newman, Kurt Busch, David Reutimann, Kyle Busch, and Clint Bowyer made up positions four through ten. NASCAR moved the second practice session to Saturday to provide eight drivers who did not set a lap time with some on-track running. David Gilliland led the session with a 48.072-second lap, ahead of Jeff Fuller, Terry Cook, and Derrike Cope.

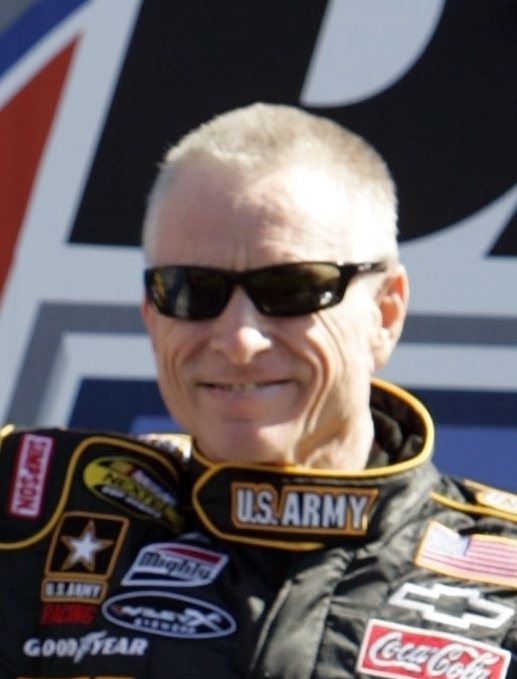
Mark Martin (pictured in 2007) became the oldest pole sitter in Daytona 500 history at 51 years old at 27 days by posting the fastest lap in qualifying.

On February 6, 54 vehicles competed in the qualifier for one of the 43 starting spots in the Daytona 500. Each driver ran two laps, and unlike most races during the season, the qualifying session determined the first two positions. The rest of the field would qualify later, through the 2010 Gatorade Duels. Qualifying was held a day early to avoid clashing with Super Bowl XLIV, which was moved forward one week by the National Football League. Friday's rain-out gave drivers little on-track preparation. Martin took his first Daytona 500 pole position, and the 49th of his career, with a lap of 47.074 seconds. At 51 years and 27 days, he was oldest pole position winner in race history. Martin was joined on the grid's front row by Earnhardt. After qualifying, Martin said it was "really special" to begin the year on pole position, and felt Earnhardt would challenge for the win.

Matt Kenseth led the third practice session on February 10 with a 46.331-second lap, followed by Kyle Busch, Brian Vickers, Jeff Burton, Edwards, Bowyer, Kasey Kahne, Reutimann, Kevin Harvick, and Joey Logano. Bowyer slid sideways into an outside barrier after his right-rear tire blew leaving turn two. Reutimann was close by, and hit the rear of Bowyer's car. Reutimann's rear, in turn, was struck by Cope's slowing car. Marcos Ambrose led the fourth practice session later that day with a 46.535-second lap, with Kyle Busch, Reed Sorenson, Logano, Kahne, Kenseth, Paul Menard, Greg Biffle, Elliott Sadler, and Edwards following in the top ten. Early in the session, Hamlin bumped Earnhardt at 190 mph (310 km/h), who controlled his car through a slide and continued. One of Vickers' tires failed exiting turn two three minutes later, and he spun through grass on the backstretch with minimal structural damage. Just after green flag running resumed, Mike Bliss oversteered on the inside exiting the fourth turn, and rammed into Logano. As the rest of the field steered away, Johnson hit the back of Hamlin's car. Johnson stopped on pit road with an orange traffic cone lodged underneath his splitter. Michael Waltrip was hit by another car and went through grass. Due to the various crashes, Bowyer, Reutimann, Cope, Bliss, Johnson, and Logano would switch into their back-up cars for the Gatorade Duels.

Johnson and Kahne won the Gatorade Duels on February 11. The starting grid was finalized with Johnson, Kahne, Harvick, Tony Stewart, Kyle Busch, Juan Pablo Montoya, Bowyer, and Kurt Busch completing the top ten. The 11 drivers that failed to qualify were Casey Mears, Todd Bodine, Gilliland, Cook, Cope, Aric Almirola, Dave Blaney, Sorenson, Mike Wallace, Norm Benning, and Fuller. Jeff Gordon switched to a back-up car for the race after being involved in a three-car accident. In the final practice session, held in cold and cloudy weather on February 13, Burton led with a 46.108-second lap, ahead of Harvick, Ambrose, Reutimann, and Kenseth, Kyle Busch, Sam Hornish Jr., Regan Smith, Montoya, and Hamlin. 15 minutes in, Bobby Labonte was hit by Scott Speed and sent towards a left-hand wall at 180 mph (290 km/h), but narrowly avoided hitting it. Smoke billowed from A. J. Allmendinger's engine compartment, and his team changed engines after the session.

=== Qualifying results ===
| Grid | No. | Driver | Team | Manufacturer | Reason |
|---|---|---|---|---|---|
| 1 | 5 | Mark Martin | Hendrick Motorsports | Chevrolet | Pole Winner |
| 2 | 88 | Dale Earnhardt Jr. | Hendrick Motorsports | Chevrolet | Outside Pole Winner |
| 3 | 48 | Jimmie Johnson | Hendrick Motorsports | Chevrolet | Duel Race 1 Winner |
| 4 | 9 | Kasey Kahne | Richard Petty Motorsports | Ford | Duel Race 2 Winner |
| 5 | 29 | Kevin Harvick | Richard Childress Racing | Chevrolet | Second in Duel 1 |
| 6 | 14 | Tony Stewart | Stewart–Haas Racing | Chevrolet | Second in Duel 2 |
| 7 | 18 | Kyle Busch | Joe Gibbs Racing | Toyota | Third in Duel 1 |
| 8 | 42 | Juan Pablo Montoya | Earnhardt Ganassi Racing | Chevrolet | Third in Duel 2 |
| 9 | 33 | Clint Bowyer | Richard Childress Racing | Chevrolet | Fourth in Duel 1 |
| 10 | 2 | Kurt Busch | Penske Championship Racing | Dodge | Fourth in Duel 2 |
| 11 | 78 | Regan Smith | Furniture Row Racing | Chevrolet | Fifth in Duel 1 |
| 12 | 19 | Elliott Sadler | Richard Petty Motorsports | Ford | Fifth in Duel 2 |
| 13 | 1 | Jamie McMurray | Earnhardt Ganassi Racing | Chevrolet | Sixth in Duel 1 |
| 14 | 56 | Martin Truex Jr. | Michael Waltrip Racing | Toyota | Sixth in Duel 2 |
| 15 | 43 | A. J. Allmendinger | Richard Petty Motorsports | Ford | Seventh in Duel 1 |
| 16 | 20 | Joey Logano | Joe Gibbs Racing | Toyota | Seventh in Duel 2 |
| 17 | 39 | Ryan Newman | Stewart–Haas Racing | Chevrolet | Eighth in Duel 1 |
| 18 | 47 | Marcos Ambrose | JTG Daugherty Racing | Toyota | Eighth in Duel 2 |
| 19 | 6 | David Ragan | Roush Fenway Racing | Ford | Ninth in Duel 1 |
| 20 | 00 | David Reutimann | Michael Waltrip Racing | Toyota | Ninth in Duel 2 |
| 21 | 24 | Jeff Gordon | Hendrick Motorsports | Chevrolet | Tenth in Duel 1 |
| 22 | 83 | Brian Vickers | Red Bull Racing Team | Toyota | Tenth in Duel 2 |
| 23 | 16 | Greg Biffle | Roush Fenway Racing | Ford | Eleventh in Duel 1 |
| 24 | 17 | Matt Kenseth | Roush Fenway Racing | Ford | Eleventh in Duel 2 |
| 25 | 11 | Denny Hamlin | Joe Gibbs Racing | Toyota | Twelfth in Duel 1 |
| 26 | 12 | Brad Keselowski | Penske Championship Racing | Dodge | Twelfth in Duel 2 |
| 27 | 99 | Carl Edwards | Roush Fenway Racing | Ford | Thirteenth in Duel 1 |
| 28 | 36 | Mike Bliss | Tommy Baldwin Racing | Chevrolet | Duel Race 2 Transfer |
| 29 | 55 | Michael McDowell | Prism Motorsports | Toyota | Duel Race 1 Transfer |
| 30 | 82 | Scott Speed | Red Bull Racing Team | Toyota | Duel Race 2 Transfer |
| 31 | 13 | Max Papis | Germain Racing | Toyota | Duel Race 1 Transfer |
| 32 | 98 | Paul Menard | Richard Petty Motorsports | Ford | Fifteenth in Duel 2 |
| 33 | 34 | John Andretti | Front Row Motorsports | Ford | Sixteenth in Duel 1 |
| 34 | 7 | Robby Gordon | Robby Gordon Motorsports | Toyota | Nineteenth in Duel 2 |
| 35 | 37 | Travis Kvapil | Front Row Motorsports | Ford | Nineteenth in Duel 1 |
| 36 | 77 | Sam Hornish Jr. | Penske Championship Racing | Dodge | Twenty-sixth in Duel 2 |
| 37 | 38 | Robert Richardson Jr. | Front Row Motorsports | Ford | Twenty-third in Duel 1 |
| 38 | 26 | Boris Said | Latitude 43 Motorsports | Ford | Twenty-seventh in Duel 1 |
| 39 | 31 | Jeff Burton | Richard Childress Racing | Chevrolet | Twenty-sixth in Duel 1 |
| 40 | 21 | Bill Elliott | Wood Brothers Racing | Ford | Speed provisional |
| 41 | 87 | Joe Nemechek | NEMCO Motorsports | Toyota | Speed provisional |
| 42 | 71 | Bobby Labonte | TRG Motorsports | Chevrolet | Speed provisional |
| 43 | 51 | Michael Waltrip | Michael Waltrip Racing | Toyota | Speed provisional |
Failed to qualify
| 44 | 90 | Casey Mears | Keyed-Up Motorsports | Chevrolet | Sixteenth in Duel 2 |
| 45 | 27 | Todd Bodine | Kirk Shelmerdine Racing | Toyota | Seventeenth in Duel 1 |
| 46 | 49 | David Gilliland | BAM Racing | Toyota | Eighteenth in Duel 2 |
| 47 | 46 | Terry Cook | Whitney Motorsports | Dodge | Twentieth in Duel 2 |
| 48 | 75 | Derrike Cope | Stratus Racing Group | Dodge | Twentieth in Duel 1 |
| 49 | 09 | Aric Almirola | Phoenix Racing | Chevrolet | Twenty-second in Duel 2 |
| 50 | 66 | Dave Blaney | Prism Motorsports | Toyota | Twenty-third in Duel 2 |
| 51 | 32 | Reed Sorenson | Braun Racing | Toyota | Twenty-fourth in Duel 1 |
| 52 | 92 | Mike Wallace | K-Automotive Motorsports | Dodge | Twenty-fourth in Duel 2 |
| 53 | 57 | Norm Benning | Norm Benning Racing | Chevrolet | Twenty-fifth in Duel 2 |
| 54 | 97 | Jeff Fuller | NEMCO Motorsports | Toyota | Twenty-seventh in Duel 1 |
^{1} Moved to the back of the field for switching to a back-up car (#24, #31, #51) and for changing engines (#43, #99)

== Race ==
Live television coverage of the race began in the United States at midday Eastern Standard Time (EST) (UTC−05:00) on Fox. Commentary was provided by lap-by-lap analyst Mike Joy, with analysis from three-time Cup Series champion Darrell Waltrip, and former crew chief Larry McReynolds. Around the start of the race, the weather was clear with the air temperature 52 °F (11 °C); conditions were expected to remain consistent. David Uth, senior pastor of First Baptist Church of Orlando, began pre-race ceremonies with an inovcation. Singer and Grammy Award winner Harry Connick Jr. performed the national anthem, and Junior Johnson, former Daytona 500 champion and NASCAR Hall of Fame inductee, commanded the drivers to start their engines. During the pace laps, Gordon, Burton, and Waltrip moved to the rear of the field because they switched into a back-up car, and Allmendinger, and Edwards did the same for changing their engines.

The race began at 1:20 p.m. EST and was scheduled to last 200 laps. Johnson pushed Martin into turn one to keep his teammate ahead. Harvick moved to third place because the inside line was faster early on. The first 21 cars were two abreast by the third lap, with a second distinct pack of vehicles in a single line. On lap four, Kahne and those behind him caught Martin but were unable to pass the latter, who maintained the lead at the start-finish line. Stewart assisted Kahne in passing Martin for the lead on the next lap. On lap six, Martin retook the lead on the outside line and turned left to keep it. The first caution was given for a multi-car accident on lap seven; Brad Keselowski's right-rear tire failed, and he struck the turn-two wall, collecting Smith, Hornish, Bliss, Max Papis, and Boris Said, and littering debris on the track. Smith retired while Keselowski and Hornish entered their garages for repairs. Most drivers made pit stops for tire and chassis adjustments. Martin took the lead on the lap-12 restart, followed by Earnhardt and Montoya. On the next lap, Harvick pushed Montoya past Martin on the outside for the lead. Montoya led just one lap, however, as Earnhardt passed him on lap 14. Earnhardt then weaved to block drivers from overtaking him.

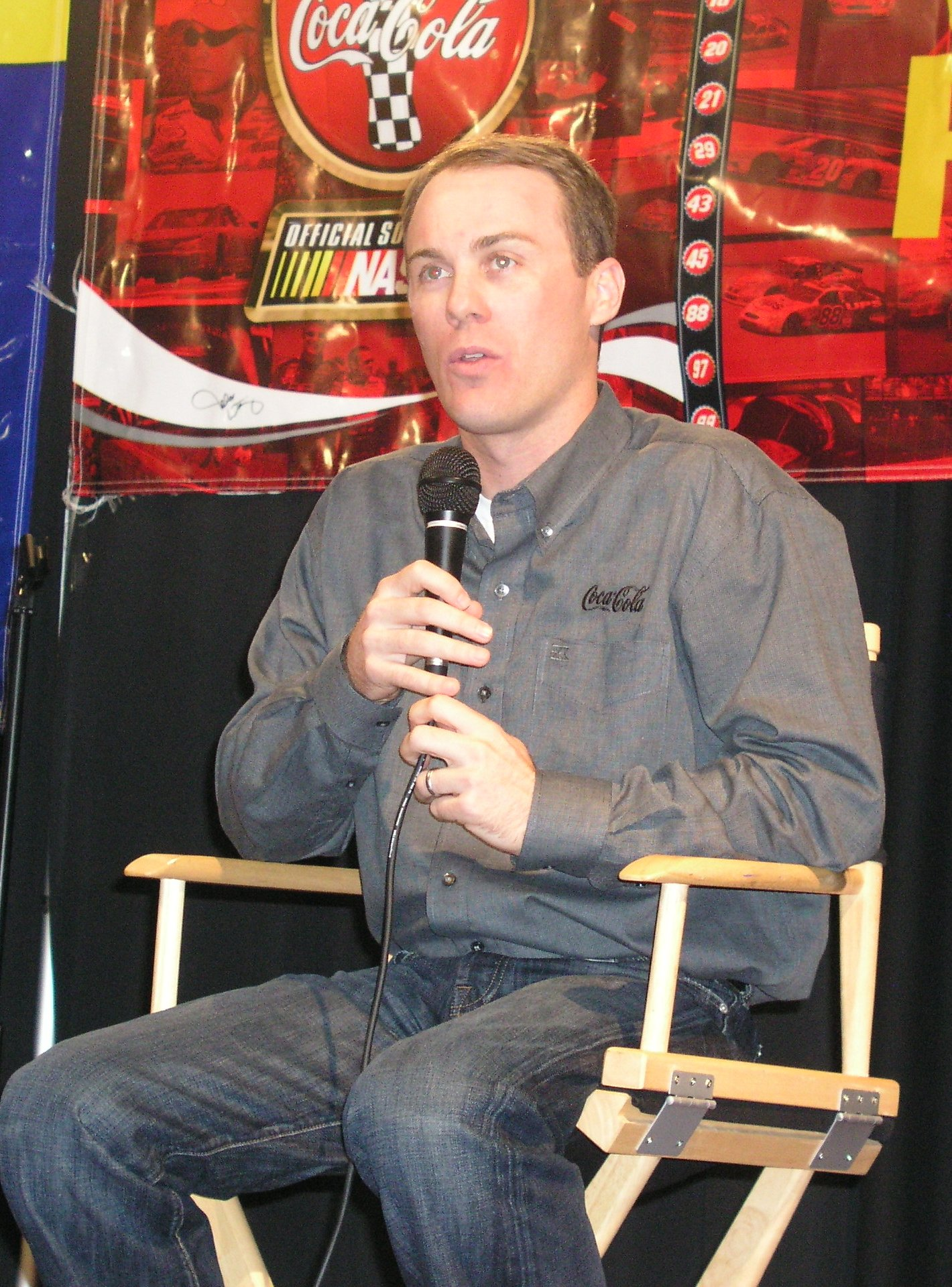
Kevin Harvick (pictured in 2006) led seven times for a total of 41 laps, more than any other driver

On lap 17, Harvick failed to pass Earnhardt for the lead into turn three. On the following lap, Harvick took the lead on the inside; Kahne and Sadler pushed him to hold the lead until they passed him for first and second on lap 22. On the next lap, Harvick returned to the lead as Kahne lost the draft and fell back. By lap 26, Kurt Busch had moved to second. Harvick, Kurt Busch, and Sadler held a 1.4-second lead by the 30th lap. Kurt Busch turned left but did not pass Harvick for the lead. Sadler overtook Kurt Busch for second on lap 34. Kurt Busch took the lead from Sadler and Harvick two laps later. Allmendinger advanced to second place on the 38th lap after starting at the back of the grid. Green flag pit stops commenced on the next lap. Kurt Busch lost the lead to Allmendinger on the backstretch on lap 45, but reclaimed it three laps later on the inside. Allmendinger entered pit road on lap 50, handing the lead to Logano, who held it until his own stop on the next lap. Robby Gordon led the 51st lap.

After the pit stops, Kurt Busch returned to first with Allmendinger second and Johnson third. They pulled away from the rest of the field. On the 58th lap, Kyle Busch overtook Kahne for fifth place. Harvick was stranded on the inside lane, and fell to sixth after Kyle Busch and Kahne passed him on the backstretch on lap 59. On lap 65 Joe Nemechek spun into the turn-four wall; Hornish avoided hitting him, but the second caution was called. The leaders made pit stops for tires and car adjustments. Kenseth stayed on the track to lead one lap until his own pit stop. Kurt Busch led at the lap-70 restart. On the next lap, Harvick helped Allmendinger retake the lead from Kurt Busch. On lap 72, Allmendinger went left, and Harvick passed him to retake the lead. Allmendinger reclaimed the lead on lap 73, when cars on the left outpaced those on the inside. Bliss spun on the backstretch four circuits later, damaging his car's rear left and bringing out the third caution.

The leaders stopped for fuel, tires, and car adjustments during the caution. When a crew member dropped a lug nut, Allmendinger lost the lead. Because Hamlin staggered his pit stop, he was able to lead one lap. Kurt Busch reclaimed the lead on lap 81, followed by Biffle and Kyle Busch. On lap 82, Biffle used Kyle Busch's help to pass Kurt Busch for first to the inside. Kurt Busch unsuccessfully challenged Biffle between laps 83 and 84. Gordon advanced to third place by the 86th lap after starting near the back of the grid. Kyle Busch took the lead from Greg Biffle on the outside on lap 95. Gordon soon passed Biffle for second place. At the end of lap 98, Gordon used the outside line to pass Kyle Busch. Two laps later, Bowyer passed Gordon on the outside for the lead on the backstretch. Kyle Busch attempted but failed to pass Bowyer in turn two on lap 102. Gordon did the same thing four laps later, but this time he was unable to take the lead and fell back.

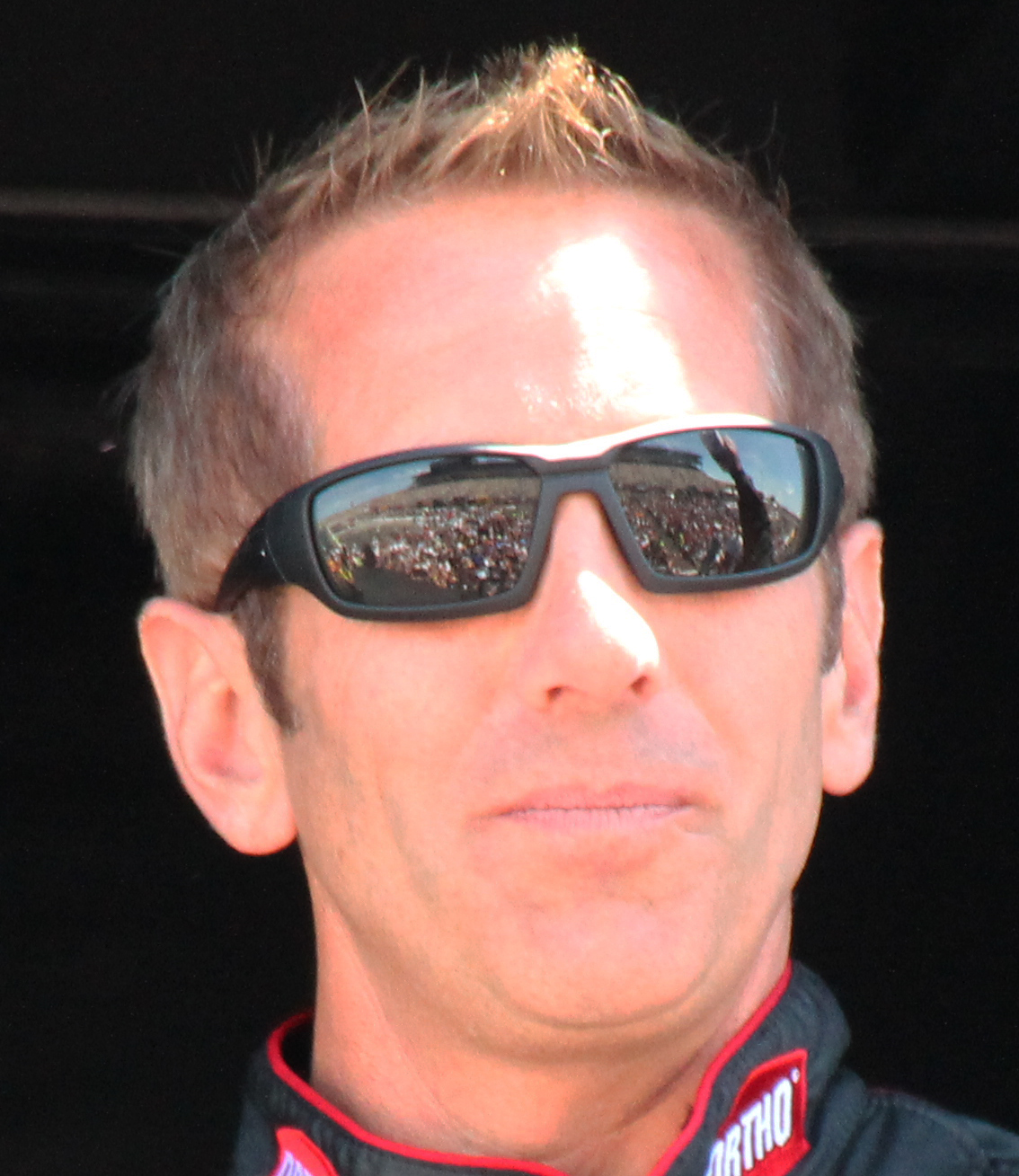
Greg Biffle (pictured in 2015) finished in third place after battling for the lead in the race's mid-point.

On the 107th lap, Biffle passed Bowyer to take the lead, but Bowyer reclaimed it on the next lap. Biffle retook the lead from Bowyer on lap 110 after a fast run on the inside. He retained it for one lap before Bowyer passed him to lead the 111th lap. David Ragan passed Bowyer at the end of lap 113 after finding a draft on the outside. Ragan lost the lead to Bowyer two laps later. John Andretti's tire cut, and hit a pothole, before he crashed into the turn-two wall on the 117th lap to bring out the fourth caution. The majority of the leaders stopped for fuel, tires, and car changes. Travis Kvapil and Said each staggered their pit stops on laps 119 and 120, leading one lap each, before Bowyer reclaimed first place on the 121st lap.

A 15 in (380 mm) long, 9 in (230 mm) wide, and 2 in (51 mm) deep pothole appeared on the seam near the yellow line between turns one and two on lap 122, causing the race to be stopped for an hour, 40 minutes, and 45 seconds. All vehicles were directed to park on pit road so that track engineers could inspect the damage. They fixed the pothole with two compounds that did not hold owing to moisture and cold weather; a third attempt permitted the race to continue. Drivers were summoned to their cars at 4:52 EST, and engines were restarted eight minutes later. Racing resumed under caution, and the pit road was reopened to drivers. Bowyer led Ragan and Kahne on the inside lane at the lap-125 restart. Sadler pushed Kahne past Bowyer (who went right) for the lead two laps later. On lap 129, Kahne repelled Bowyer by turning right, allowing Sadler to pull alongside him. Bowyer took the lead on the next lap, but Sadler passed him before the finish line. Sadler lost the lead to Bowyer on lap 131, but reclaimed it on the following lap.

During the 136th lap, Harvick made it three abreast on the backstretch, putting Sadler in the middle of the track, and Bowyer reclaimed the lead. Two laps later, Harvick overtook teammate Bowyer just before the start-finish line. On lap 141, Gordon attempted to pass Bowyer for third, but Kahne helped Bowyer block Gordon. On lap 142, Allmendinger, fifth, spun into the backstretch after losing control of his car in turn four. He avoided a collision with a wall and became stranded in the grass, where his car caught fire, causing the sixth caution. During the caution, most drivers made pit stops for tires and adjustments. Sadler led the 146 restart with two new tires, followed by Martin Truex Jr. and Harvick. Truex passed Sadler two laps later with help from Harvick to take the lead. Sadler went to the outside on lap 150 and dropped to tenth place after a failed challenge for first. Harvick reclaimed the lead by overtaking Truex on the inside on the next lap. Montoya gained the lead for the second time on the 154th lap, but Harvick passed him to recover the lead.

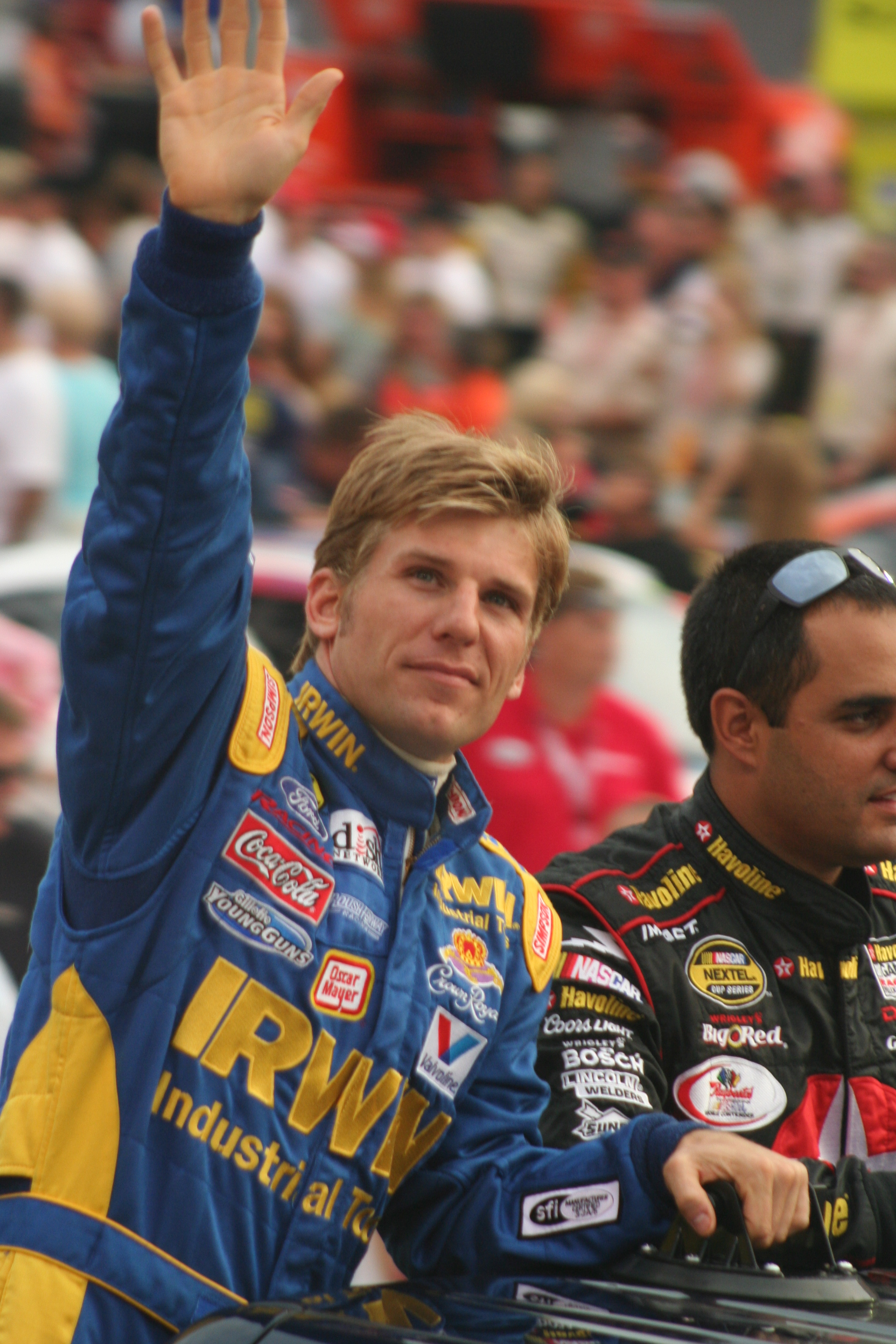
Jamie McMurray (pictured in 2007) took the lead from Harvick on the penultimate lap and took his first Daytona 500 victory.

A competition caution was issued for teams on lap 161 to inspect their vehicles because the pothole between turns one and two had resurfaced, larger than before. The race was halted for the second time on lap 161, and cars were obliged to park on pit road for 44 minutes and 35 seconds. Workers collected polyester resin products from other teams and blended them with a hardener. They then heated the compound with blow torches and jet dryers to make the track driveable. Drivers reentered their cars at 6:22 p.m. EST, and restarted their engines eight minutes later. The race resumed under caution as the leaders stopped for tire and car adjustments. Due to the lengthy delays, the race would end in cooler nighttime conditions, meaning the handling of cars were vastly different than planned for by teams. Speed took the lead for the lap 168 restart. On the following lap, Biffle used drafting from teammates Ragan and Edwards on the outside lane to pass Speed for first. On the 176th lap, Speed retook the lead from Biffle on the inside lane. He battled Biffle for the following seven laps until Biffle moved away on lap 184. Kurt Busch overtook Edwards for third on lap 188. The seventh caution came six laps later, when Sadler lost control of his car on the backstretch and struck the barrier, collecting Kvapil and Newman. Bowyer led Biffle and Truex at the lap 198 restart.

Biffle passed Bowyer for first on the backstretch heading towards turn three before an eighth caution was waved for an accident on lap 199 and froze the race order; Elliott and Logano collided in the third turn, collecting Said. On lap 202, Biffle led at the first green–white–checker finish, prolonging the race by two laps. On the next lap, just as Harvick took the lead from Biffle on the inside line in turn two after Biffle got sideways in the first turn, the ninth caution was issued when Gordon hit Kahne on the backstretch and Kahne slid up the track, collecting Robert Richardson Jr. and Labonte. A second green–white–checker finish restarted the race on lap 206 (bringing it to 208 laps), with Harvick leading Jamie McMurray, who experienced wheelspin in the rear wheels. Edwards pushed Harvick on the inside line into turn one but then delayed him, allowing McMurray to take the lead with help from Biffle on the outside at turn three on lap 207. Earnhardt moved from tenth to second within 1½ laps after changing all four tires at his final pit stop, but could not challenge McMurray, who took his first Daytona 500 win, and the fourth of his career. (Note: Team owner Chip Ganassi became the second person after Roger Penske to have owned a team which has won both the Indianapolis 500 and the Daytona 500.) Earnhardt, Biffle, Bowyer, Reutimann, Truex, Harvick, Kenseth, Edwards and Montoya completed the top ten. There were 52 lead changes among a then-record 21 drivers during the race. (Note: The event record was bettered with 74 lead changes amongst 22 drivers at the 2011 Daytona 500.) Harvick led the most laps of any driver, with 41. McMurray led once for two laps.

=== Post-race comments ===
"I look around at everybody and I wonder how did I get here, You have a flashback of your entire racing career and you look back and pull little pieces of it out all through your career, thinking about the possibility of something like this happening. You're always shooting for that, trying for that. You just get very reflective about everything, about every sacrifice you made, every tough meeting I've had with a crew chief or a driver or even Felix. The ups and downs of this business sure seem all worth it right now."

— Earnhardt Ganassi Racing team owner Chip Ganassi talking about his success in the Daytona 500.

McMurray appeared in Victory Lane after celebrating in the infield to commemorate his fourth career win in front of an estimated crowd of 175,000 people; the win earned him $1,508,449. He was emotional about his victory, saying, "I can't really put it into words the way it feels. I'm trying to be genuine and as sincere as I can and not sound cliché: as a kid growing up, this is what you dream of, of being able to win the Daytona 500." Earnhardt said finishing second validated the changes his team made, and was confident about his prospects over the coming races. He commented on the on-track action, "I went wherever they weren't, I don't enjoy being that aggressive. If there was room for the radiator, you hold the gas down and go. They did a lot to put the racing back in the driver's hands. There was a ton of bumping out there and I never felt like anyone was looking over my shoulder." Third-placed Biffle said he felt he made his move too soon on the first green–white–checker finish, "The restarts, I couldn't get anybody to push me, I kept getting a run. I wish I waited until the backstretch to make my big run. I did it on the frontstretch. I gave Junior and all the guys too much of an opportunity to catch us."

The race was the first since the 2004 Advance Auto Parts 500 at Martinsville Speedway to be affected by a deteriorating track. The pothole's reemergence was attributed to the cars' 3,000 lb (1,400 kg) weight uprooting the surface patch, and enlarging it to twice its original size. Daytona International Speedway President Robin Braig took responsibility and apologized for the track surface. He stated that no issues were discovered during a pre-race inspection, and believed cars running too low to the ground for better aerodynamic efficiency had caused the pothole. A week of heavy rain that flooded the track in May 2009, the pre-race downpour, below-average ground temperatures, and cars bottoming out and scraping the tarmac surface all contributed to the pothole forming. Between February 18 and 20, engineers and asphalt specialists repaired the damage with a 6 ft (1.8 m) wide and 18 ft (5.5 m) section of concrete. The track was later repaved from July 5 to December 10, its first repaving since 1978.

Earnhardt said he was unsatisfied with the reviewed green-white-checker finish rules because he was uncertain about drivers' actions, but he did not believe it was overdone, "I feel like the fans deserve probably more of a show, so that's what they got. The green-white-checkered was put into play to give us an opportunity to finish the race under green. Finishing under yellow is quite a melodramatic moment." Gordon reiterated an earlier view of his that only one attempt should be made, "I believe in doing things for the fans but I also think they have their limits. It wasn't going to give us a winning day by not having multiple green-white-checkers but it would have saved us a race car." Pemberton stated that the rule change validated NASCAR increasing the on-track action and emphasized that three efforts were made to finish the race, "I've seen great [Daytona 500s] that were a half-dozen cars duking it out, And this race right here, with the potential of the top 15 or 20 guys up there, in the last 25 miles, was incredible. A great race in my opinion though I've only watched 33 of 'em."

Because this was the season's first race, McMurray led the Drivers' Championship with 195 points, followed by Earnhardt with 15 points less in second. Biffle, Bowyer, Harvick, Reutimann, Truex, Kenseth, Montoya, Edwards, Martin, and Burton rounded out the top twelve drivers. Chevrolet led the Manufacturers' Championship with nine points, three ahead of Ford, five ahead of Toyota, and six ahead of Dodge. The race attracted 13.294 million television viewers; excluding the two stoppages, it took three hours, 47 minutes and 16 seconds to complete, and the margin of victory was 0.119 seconds. The race was included in NASCAR's list of their 75 greatest races to commemorate the sport's 75th anniversary in 2023.

=== Race results ===
| Pos. | Grid | No. | Driver | Team | Manufacturer | Laps | Points |
|---|---|---|---|---|---|---|---|
| 1 | 13 | 1 | Jamie McMurray | Earnhardt Ganassi Racing | Chevrolet | 208 | 190^{1} |
| 2 | 2 | 88 | Dale Earnhardt Jr. | Hendrick Motorsports | Chevrolet | 208 | 175^{1} |
| 3 | 23 | 16 | Greg Biffle | Roush Fenway Racing | Ford | 208 | 170^{1} |
| 4 | 9 | 33 | Clint Bowyer | Richard Childress Racing | Chevrolet | 208 | 165^{1} |
| 5 | 20 | 00 | David Reutimann | Michael Waltrip Racing | Toyota | 208 | 155 |
| 6 | 14 | 56 | Martin Truex Jr. | Michael Waltrip Racing | Toyota | 208 | 155^{1} |
| 7 | 5 | 29 | Kevin Harvick | Richard Childress Racing | Chevrolet | 208 | 156^{2} |
| 8 | 24 | 17 | Matt Kenseth | Roush Fenway Racing | Ford | 208 | 142 |
| 9 | 27 | 99 | Carl Edwards | Roush Fenway Racing | Ford | 208 | 138 |
| 10 | 8 | 42 | Juan Pablo Montoya | Earnhardt Ganassi Racing | Chevrolet | 208 | 139^{1} |
| 11 | 39 | 31 | Jeff Burton | Richard Childress Racing | Chevrolet | 208 | 130 |
| 12 | 1 | 5 | Mark Martin | Hendrick Motorsports | Chevrolet | 208 | 132^{1} |
| 13 | 32 | 98 | Paul Menard | Richard Petty Motorsports | Ford | 208 | 124 |
| 14 | 7 | 18 | Kyle Busch | Joe Gibbs Racing | Toyota | 208 | 126^{1} |
| 15 | 22 | 83 | Brian Vickers | Red Bull Racing Team | Toyota | 208 | 118 |
| 16 | 19 | 6 | David Ragan | Roush Fenway Racing | Ford | 208 | 120^{1} |
| 17 | 25 | 11 | Denny Hamlin | Joe Gibbs Racing | Toyota | 208 | 117^{1} |
| 18 | 43 | 51 | Michael Waltrip | Michael Waltrip Racing | Toyota | 208 | 109 |
| 19 | 30 | 82 | Scott Speed | Red Bull Racing Team | Toyota | 208 | 111^{1} |
| 20 | 16 | 20 | Joey Logano | Joe Gibbs Racing | Toyota | 208 | 108^{1} |
| 21 | 42 | 71 | Bobby Labonte | TRG Motorsports | Chevrolet | 208 | 100 |
| 22 | 6 | 14 | Tony Stewart | Stewart–Haas Racing | Chevrolet | 208 | 97 |
| 23 | 10 | 2 | Kurt Busch | Penske Championship Racing | Dodge | 208 | 99^{1} |
| 24 | 12 | 19 | Elliott Sadler | Richard Petty Motorsports | Ford | 208 | 96^{1} |
| 25 | 38 | 26 | Boris Said | Latitude 43 Motorsports | Ford | 208 | 93^{1} |
| 26 | 21 | 24 | Jeff Gordon | Hendrick Motorsports | Chevrolet | 208 | 90^{1} |
| 27 | 40 | 21 | Bill Elliott | Wood Brothers Racing | Ford | 208 | 82 |
| 28 | 34 | 7 | Robby Gordon | Robby Gordon Motorsports | Toyota | 207 | 84^{1} |
| 29 | 35 | 37 | Travis Kvapil | Front Row Motorsports | Ford | 205 | 81^{1} |
| 30 | 4 | 9 | Kasey Kahne | Richard Petty Motorsports | Ford | 202 | 78^{1} |
| 31 | 37 | 38 | Robert Richardson Jr. | Front Row Motorsports | Ford | 202 | 70 |
| 32 | 15 | 43 | A. J. Allmendinger | Richard Petty Motorsports | Ford | 198 | 72^{1} |
| 33 | 29 | 55 | Michael McDowell | Prism Motorsports | Toyota | 195 | 64 |
| 34 | 17 | 39 | Ryan Newman | Stewart–Haas Racing | Chevrolet | 193 | 61 |
| 35 | 3 | 48 | Jimmie Johnson | Hendrick Motorsports | Chevrolet | 185 | 58 |
| 36 | 26 | 12 | Brad Keselowski | Penske Championship Racing | Dodge | 174 | 55 |
| 37 | 36 | 77 | Sam Hornish Jr. | Penske Championship Racing | Dodge | 160 | 52 |
| 38 | 33 | 34 | John Andretti | Front Row Motorsports | Ford | 117 | 49 |
| 39 | 11 | 78 | Regan Smith | Furniture Row Racing | Chevrolet | 90 | 46 |
| 40 | 31 | 13 | Max Papis | Germain Racing | Toyota | 89 | 43 |
| 41 | 18 | 47 | Marcos Ambrose | JTG Daugherty Racing | Toyota | 79 | 43 |
| 42 | 28 | 36 | Mike Bliss | Tommy Baldwin Racing | Chevrolet | 76 | 37 |
| 43 | 41 | 87 | Joe Nemechek | NEMCO Motorsports | Toyota | 64 | 34 |
^{1} Includes five bonus points for leading a lap
^{2} Includes ten bonus points for leading the most laps

== Standings after the race ==
Drivers' Championship standings

| Pos | Driver | Points |
|---|---|---|
| 1 | Jamie McMurray | 190 |
| 2 | Dale Earnhardt Jr. | 175 (−15) |
| 3 | Greg Biffle | 170 (−20) |
| 4 | Clint Bowyer | 165 (−25) |
| 5 | Kevin Harvick | 156 (−34) |
| 6 | David Reutimann | 155 (−35) |
| 7 | Martin Truex Jr. | 155 (−35) |
| 8 | Matt Kenseth | 142 (−48) |
| 9 | Juan Pablo Montoya | 139 (−51) |
| 10 | Carl Edwards | 138 (−52) |
| 11 | Mark Martin | 132 (−58) |
| 12 | Jeff Burton | 130 (−60) |

Manufacturers' Championship standings

| Pos | Manufacturer | Points |
|---|---|---|
| 1 | Chevrolet | 9 |
| 2 | Ford | 6 (−3) |
| 3 | Toyota | 4 (−5) |
| 4 | Dodge | 3 (−6) |

- Note: Only the top twelve positions are included for the driver standings.

== Notes and references ==
=== References ===
| Previous race: 2009 Ford 400 | Sprint Cup Series; 2010 season | Next race: 2010 Auto Club 500 |
