= Stan Boyd =

American racing driver (born 1970)

- Born: September 16, 1970 (age 56); Holly, Michigan, U.S.

NASCAR O'Reilly Auto Parts Series career
- 13 races run over 2 years
- Best finish: 48th (2004)
- First race: 2003 MBNA Armed Forces Family 200 (Dover)
- Last race: 2004 Ford 300 (Homestead)
Wins	Top tens	Poles
0	0	0

NASCAR FedEx Freight Truck Series career
- 47 races run over 6 years
- Best finish: 25th (2002)
- First race: 1998 Memphis 200 (Memphis)
- Last race: 2003 Silverado 350 (Texas)
Wins	Top tens	Poles
0	0	0
- Statistics up to date as of November 28, 2012.

Stan Boyd (born September 16, 1970) is an American former professional stock car racing driver who competed in both the Busch Series and NASCAR Craftsman Truck Series.

== Truck Series ==
Boyd made his NASCAR debut in the 1998 Memphis race driving for EVI Motorsports, starting 35th and finishing 29th after ignition failure late in the race. He ran at Mesa Marin for Steve Coulter later in the year, dropping out after just two laps due to engine failure.

Boyd then ran four races in 1999 for EVI Motorsports with a best finish of 22nd at Gateway. In 2000 Boyd ran two races for John Conely, finishing a solid nineteenth at Mesa Marin. He returned to EVI for three races later on with less luck. He ran a full season with EVI in 2001, making just ten of the 25 races, but earning three top-twenty finishes including a career-best thirteenth at California.

Boyd continued the same schedule for EVI in 2002, making thirteen races out of 25, improving on last season, but scoring just one top-twenty finish at Fort Worth. He ran the first two races of 2003 for EVI with a sixteenth at Daytona and a fifteenth at Darlington. He then ran two races for Gene Cristensen before making four races for Ware Racing Enterprises, start and parking in all of those races. He then returned to EVI, but only made four more races and one more top-twenty finish.

== Busch Series ==
Boyd made his Busch Series debut at Dover in 2003 for MacDonald Motorsports, starting 32nd and finishing five laps down in 23rd. It was his only start of the year.

Boyd moved full-time to the Busch Series in 2004 with Ware Racing Enterprises. He attempted Daytona with the team's second car, the No. 57, with Kevin Conway as his teammate in the No. 51. Both failed to qualify. Boyd would not make another attempt until Darlington, which he made, but suffered engine failure early on and finished 41st.

Boyd moved over to the No. 51 at Bristol with Morgan Shepherd taking over the No. 57. Boyd qualified 33rd and finished a solid 25th, four laps down. He failed to make the next two races and then Kim Crosby ran the car at Talladega. Boyd then made California, but coming into the pits he spun, knocking two tires into his own pit crew. He finished 38th. Boyd then finished 32nd after engine failure at Gateway. Shepherd ran the No. 51 at Richmond with Travis Powell running at Nazareth. Boyd returned at Charlotte and made the field, but Joe Gibbs Racing bought them out and placed J. J. Yeley, who had failed to qualify, into the car. Boyd made the field at Dover but crashed out on lap 34, finishing 38th. David Eshleman ran the No. 51 at Nashville, but Boyd returned at Kentucky, finishing last after parking the car on lap two.

With Bobby Dotter, Kim Crosby, and Blake Mallory running the next three races, Boyd did not see another race until New Hampshire, where he had to park the car on lap seventeen as funding was decreasing. Boyd moved back to the No. 57 with Crosby running the No. 51 at Pike's Peak. Both would start and park on lap eleven. Boyd then got to run the whole Indianapolis Raceway Park race in the No. 57, finishing 27th, four laps down. Boyd then left Ware Racing to join MacDonald Motorsports.

Boyd's career with the MacDonald team began at California where he ran a backup car, the No. 71. He parked on lap ten, finishing 38th. He did not attempt any more races until Kansas, where he failed to qualify. At Memphis, Boyd ran a third car, the No. 70, but again failed to qualify. Boyd got to run the team's main No. 72 car for the final two races of the season, finishing a solid 26th just three laps down at Darlington. At Homestead-Miami he finished 32nd, four laps down. However, he wasn't kept on for 2005.

Boyd returned to the series in 2005 at Atlanta with Means Racing, but failed to qualify. He later attempted Kentucky in 2006 with Keith Coleman Racing in the No. 23, but again failed to qualify. He has not attempted a race since.

== Motorsports career results ==
=== NASCAR ===
(key) (Bold – Pole position awarded by qualifying time. Italics – Pole position earned by points standings or practice time. * – Most laps led.)

==== Nextel Cup Series ====
NASCAR Nextel Cup Series results
Year	Team	No.	Make	1	2	3	4	5	6	7	8	9	10	11	12	13	14	15	16	17	18	19	20	21	22	23	24	25	26	27	28	29	30	31	32	33	34	35	36	NNCC	Pts	Ref
2004	Conely Racing	79	Chevy	DAY	CAR	LVS	ATL	DAR	BRI	TEX	MAR	TAL	CAL	RCH	CLT	DOV	POC	MCH	SON	DAY	CHI	NHA	POC	IND	GLN	MCH; DNQ	BRI	CAL	RCH	NHA; DNQ	DOV	TAL	KAN	CLT	MAR	ATL	PHO	DAR	HOM	NA	-	
2005	Conely Racing	79	Chevy	DAY	CAL; DNQ	LVS; DNQ	ATL	BRI	MAR	TEX	PHO	TAL	DAR	RCH	CLT	DOV	POC	MCH	SON	DAY	CHI	NHA	POC	IND	GLN	MCH	BRI	CAL	RCH	NHA	DOV	TAL	KAN	CLT	MAR	ATL	TEX	PHO	HOM	NA	-	

==== Busch Series ====
NASCAR Busch Series results
Year	Team	No.	Make	1	2	3	4	5	6	7	8	9	10	11	12	13	14	15	16	17	18	19	20	21	22	23	24	25	26	27	28	29	30	31	32	33	34	35	NBSC	Pts	Ref
2003	MacDonald Motorsports	72	Chevy	DAY	CAR	LVS	DAR	BRI	TEX	TAL	NSH	CAL	RCH	GTY	NZH	CLT	DOV; 23	NSH	KEN; DNQ	MLW	DAY	CHI	NHA	PPR	IRP														125th	94	
2003	Bost Motorsports	22	Chevy																							MCH; QL^{†}	BRI	DAR	RCH	DOV	KAN	CLT	MEM	ATL					125th	94	
2003	Ware Racing Enterprises	51	Chevy																																PHO; DNQ	CAR	HOM; DNQ		125th	94	
2004	Ware Racing Enterprises	57	Chevy	DAY; DNQ	CAR	LVS; DNQ	DAR; 41																	PPR; 39	IRP; 27	MCH	BRI												48th	699	
2004	Ware Racing Enterprises	51	Chevy					BRI; 25					GTY; 32	RCH	NZH	CLT	DOV; 38	NSH	KEN; 43	MLW	DAY	CHI																	48th	699	
2004	Ware Racing Enterprises	51	Dodge						TEX; DNQ	NSH; DNQ	TAL	CAL; 38											NHA; 39																48th	699	
2004	MacDonald Motorsports	71	Chevy																									CAL; 39	RCH		KAN; DNQ	CLT							48th	699	
2004	Race Kentucky Motorsports	65	Chevy																											DOV; DNQ									48th	699	
2004	Davis Motorsports	70	Chevy																														MEM; DNQ	ATL	PHO				48th	699	
2004	MacDonald Motorsports	72	Chevy																																	DAR; 26	HOM; 32		48th	699	
2005	Jimmy Means Racing	52	Ford	DAY	CAL	MXC	LVS	ATL; DNQ	NSH	BRI	TEX	PHO	TAL	DAR	RCH	CLT	DOV	NSH	KEN	MLW	DAY	CHI	NHA	PPR	GTY	IRP	GLN	MCH	BRI	CAL	RCH	DOV	KAN	CLT	MEM	TEX	PHO	HOM	NA	-	
2006	Keith Coleman Racing	23	Chevy	DAY	CAL	MXC	LVS	ATL	BRI	TEX	NSH	PHO	TAL	RCH	DAR	CLT	DOV	NSH	KEN; DNQ	MLW	DAY	CHI	NHA	MAR	GTY	IRP	GLN	MCH	BRI	CAL	RCH	DOV	KAN	CLT	MEM	TEX	PHO	HOM	NA	-	
^{†} - Qualified but replaced by Justin Ashburn

==== Craftsman Truck Series ====
NASCAR Craftsman Truck Series results
Year	Team	No.	Make	1	2	3	4	5	6	7	8	9	10	11	12	13	14	15	16	17	18	19	20	21	22	23	24	25	26	27	NCTC	Pts	Ref
1998	EVI Motorsports	89	Chevy	WDW	HOM	PHO	POR	EVG	I70	GLN	TEX	BRI	MLW	NZH	CAL	PPR	IRP	NHA	FLM	NSV	HPT	LVL	RCH	MEM; 29	GTY	MAR	SON				80th	140	
1998	Xpress Motorsports	61	Ford																									MMR; 33	PHO	LVS	80th	140	
1999	EVI Motorsports	89	Chevy	HOM	PHO	EVG	MMR	MAR	MEM; 20	PPR	I70	BRI	TEX	PIR	GLN	MLW	NSV; 28	NZH	MCH; 25	NHA	IRP; 26	GTY; 22	HPT	RCH	LVS	LVL	TEX	CAL			43rd	452	
2000	Conely Racing	7	Chevy	DAY	HOM	PHO; 27	MMR; 19	MAR	PIR																						51st	432	
2000	EVI Motorsports	89	Chevy							GTY; DNQ	MEM; DNQ	PPR	EVG	TEX	KEN; 34	GLN	MLW	NHA	NZH	MCH; 25	IRP	NSV	CIC; DNQ	RCH	DOV	TEX	CAL; 24				51st	432	
2001	Conely Racing	7	Chevy	DAY	HOM	MMR	MAR; DNQ																								35th	848	
2001	EVI Motorsports	89	Chevy					GTY; 30	DAR	PPR	DOV	TEX; 28	MEM	MLW	KAN	KEN; 29	NHA	IRP; 36	NSH	CIC; 36	NZH; 35	RCH	SBO	TEX; 16	LVS; 17	PHO; 35	CAL; 13				35th	848	
2002	EVI Motorsports	89	Chevy	DAY; DNQ	DAR	MAR	GTY; 32			TEX; 16	MEM	MLW	KAN; 35	KEN; 28	NHA	MCH; 25	IRP	NSH; 33	RCH; DNQ	TEX; 34	SBO	LVS; 31	CAL; 23	PHO; 24	HOM; 35						25th	915	
2002	Richardson Motorsports	0	Chevy					PPR; 21	DOV; 31																						25th	915	
2003	EVI Motorsports	89	Chevy	DAY; 16	DAR; 15	MMR	MAR	CLT														CAL; 20	LVS	SBO	TEX; 21	MAR					32nd	799	
2003	Green Light Racing	07	Chevy						DOV; 28	TEX; 29																					32nd	799	
2003	Ware Racing Enterprises	51	Dodge								MEM; DNQ	MLW; 36	KAN; 33	KEN; 34	GTW; 36																32nd	799	
2003	EVI Motorsports	89	Dodge													MCH; 29	IRP; 30	NSH	BRI	RCH	NHA										32nd	799	
2003	Ware Racing Enterprises	5	Dodge																								PHO; DNQ	HOM			32nd	799	

=== ARCA Re/Max Series ===
(key) (Bold – Pole position awarded by qualifying time. Italics – Pole position earned by points standings or practice time. * – Most laps led.)

ARCA Re/Max Series results
Year	Team	No.	Make	1	2	3	4	5	6	7	8	9	10	11	12	13	14	15	16	17	18	19	20	21	22	23	ARMC	Pts	Ref
2005	Hardcore Motorsports	08	Dodge	DAY	NSH	SLM	KEN	TOL	LAN	MIL	POC	MCH	KAN	KEN	BLN	POC	GTW	LER	NSH	MCH	ISF	TOL	DSF	CHI; 24			116th	170	
2005	Hardcore Motorsports	08	Chevy																						SLM; 34	TAL	116th	170	
