= Jeff Fuller (racing driver) =

American racing driver (born 1957)

- Born: March 27, 1957 (age 69); Boylston, Massachusetts, U.S.
- Achievements: 1992 NASCAR Winston Modified Tour Champion
- Awards: 1995 NASCAR Busch Series Rookie of the Year

NASCAR Cup Series career
- 14 races run over 5 years
- Best finish: 53rd (2000)
- First race: 1992 Pontiac Excitement 400 (Richmond)
- Last race: 2010 AMP Energy Juice 500 (Talladega)
Wins	Top tens	Poles
0	0	0

NASCAR O'Reilly Auto Parts Series career
- 188 races run over 16 years
- Best finish: 10th (1995)
- First race: 1992 AC-Delco 200 (Rockingham)
- Last race: 2009 Kroger On Track for the Cure 250 (Memphis)
- First win: 1996 Food City 250 (Bristol)
Wins	Top tens	Poles
1	14	1
- Statistics up to date as of January 10, 2007.

Jeffrey Fuller (born March 27, 1957) is an American former professional stock car racing driver. Before joining NASCAR's major leagues, Fuller won the 1992 Winston Modified Tour championship, driving for Sheba Racing. The Massachusetts native has 31 wins on the Modified Tour and was named the series' most popular drivers for three consecutive seasons (1992–1994). He is the older brother of the fellow NASCAR driver Rick Fuller.

== Racing career ==
=== Busch Series ===
Fuller made his Busch Series career in 1992, making one start. Driving the No. 20 First Ade Oldsmobile for Dick Moroso, Fuller started 27th and finished 26th, twenty-nine laps down.

Three years later, in 1995, after a run in the Whelen Modified Series, Fuller moved to the Busch Series to compete for Rookie of the Year. His team would be the No. 47 Sunoco Chevy owned by ST Motorsports. His sole top-five was a fourth in the fall race at Charlotte. He also added on five other top-tens. His best start in the season was only a pair of tenths at New Hampshire and Rockingham. He also finished in the top-30 in all but one race and only recorded five DNFs. This enabled him to finish tenth in points in just his first season in Busch Series, earning him Rookie of the Year honors.

Missing two races relegated Fuller back to seventeenth in points in 1996. In the same weekend at Bristol, Fuller won his first career pole, won his first career race and his wife Liz gave birth to a child. Fuller only managed three other top-tens in 1996. He made one of his starts in a Michael Ritch-owned car, driving the No. 02 ECU Pirates at Rockingham to a 38th place finish. That same year, Fuller won a race in a one-off start at Thompson Speedway in what was then the Busch North Series.

Fuller's team continued to struggle in early 1997. Fuller managed only two top-tens in his first fifteen races, (seventh at Darlington and third at New Hampshire) Fuller was released from the No. 47 after running eighteenth in points. Fuller missed the next two races, but then signed on to become the driver for the No. 45 Hunters Specialties Chevy for Mike Laughlin, earning finishes of seventh at Gateway and ninth at Bristol. However, Fuller was replaced for the last race by Greg Sacks, but drove the No. 5 Alka-Seltzer Chevy for Terry Labonte. After finishing 14th, he cemented a 21st-place finish in points.

In 1998, Fuller only made eleven starts, making races with five different teams. Most of the season was with the No. 89 Allerest Chevy owned by Meredith Ruark. His best finish with them was 25th at Charlotte. Overall, Fuller's best finish of 1998 was with Laughlin's racing team at Pikes Peak, where he finished 11th. Fuller also paired with Joe Gibbs Racing in 1998. He drove their No. 42 Carolina Turkey Pontiac at Charlotte to a fifteenth-place finish. Fuller's other top-20 finish in 1998 was for Bill Elliott at Miami, where he finished fifteenth as well.

In 1999, Fuller made 27 of the season's 32 races, but did not record a single top-ten. Fuller ran the first twenty-two races with Ruark's team, earning a best finish of twelfth at Pikes Peak and IRP. While with the team, he also had a vicious accident a Dover when he spun and slammed into the pit road wall hard twice and breaking it after contact with Phil Parsons. Fuller made four starts for Joe Gibbs again, driving the No. 42 Circuit City Pontiac to a best of 12th at Darlington. Fuller also added on one more start with Lyndon Amick's team. He finished 33rd at Memphis Motorsports Park. Fuller's best start in 1999 was fifth at Pikes Peak, and he finished 22nd in points.

When Fuller went to Winston Cup racing, he only made one 2000 start. It was for Moy Racing, where he started 43rd on the field at Bristol, but came back to a 21st place finish.

Fuller only made one start in 2001, as well. Driving for NEMCO Motorsports, he started 40th at California and finished 42nd after only completing five laps.

Fuller made two more starts for NEMCO in 2002, running at Daytona and Talladega. However, despite a fifth place start at Daytona, he finished 42nd there and fortieth at Talladega due to large multi car crashes.

Fuller made 13 starts overall in 2003, driving for assorted teams. Mainly, he split his time between NEMCO and Stanton Barrett's team. His best finishes on the year were a fifteenth at Bristol for NEMCO and 18th at Nashville for Barrett. He also had a 24th place run at Daytona for Bost Motorsports. He only finished three races that year.

In 2004, Fuller ran the most races in a season of his career since 1999 for NEMCO Motorsports. Unfortunately, his best finish was 35th at Nazareth, as he did not finish a race that year. He also caused controversy during the season as he rarely completed more than a handful of laps before pulling out of the race.

In 2005, Fuller started off the year driving two races for NEMCO, but he was quickly replaced by Kim Crosby, whose team bought the No. 7 NEMCO ride. Ironically, Fuller replaced Crosby later in the year, driving the No. 7 Big Boar Customs Chevy for GIC-Mixon Motorsports for the remainder of the year. Fuller qualified for fifteen races with the team, and his best finishes were at Dover, where he finished 24th in the fall and 25th in the spring. After Memphis, where Fuller finished 42nd, the team folded due to lack of funding, leaving Fuller without a ride.

Fuller returned to the Busch Series in 2006 at the June Nashville race. He was signed to drive the No. 34 GlowBuoy Chevrolet for Frank Cicci Racing where he started 38th and finishing 27th.

=== Kentucky crash ===
Fuller was involved in an incredible accident at the Kentucky Speedway on June 17, 2006, when he swerved to avoid Jason Leffler's spinning car and ended up hitting the inside wall at almost full speed. The car practically imploded upon impact and then burst into flames briefly. Despite the car hitting the wall on the right side, the left side came apart. Amazingly, he never lost consciousness but the car's roof had to be cut off to extract him. He was taken to the hospital to be treated for smoke inhalation and amazingly only a broken wrist and finger. He was released the next day. They determined that the implosion of the car was due to a faulty roll cage which failed during the crash.

Fuller made a full recovery from the accident, but when Frank Cicci closed up the No. 34 team for the rest of the year, Fuller was again left without a ride and his status.

=== Return to racing ===
For 2007, Fuller drove for Stanton Barrett Motorsports on a limited basis.

Fuller began the 2008 season looking for a ride. Meanwhile, Fuller remained in the garage area during most Nationwide Series races helping young drivers learn to handle their car and master new tracks. In February 2008, Fuller traveled to Afghanistan for a ten-day visit to six camps meeting soldiers, signing autographs and seeing first hand what the troops go through while deployed.

R3 Motorsports placed Fuller behind the wheel of their No. 23 Chevrolet for the 2009 NASCAR Nationwide Series race at Darlington Raceway. Fuller replaced Robert Richardson, Jr. for the two-hundred-lap event. This was his first series start since the Montreal road course race in 2008, and he finished in thirtieth place.

Fuller planned to drive the No. 97 Chevrolet in the 2010 Nationwide Season opener at Daytona for NEMCO Motorsports, but he withdrew even though he would have made the race, after qualifying was cancelled due to rain. Fuller was one of five drivers to be paid by John Menard and team owner Jack Roush (the approximate amount for each driver was around $45,000, equivalent to a last-place finish) to drop out so John's son Paul could compete.

=== Sprint Cup Series ===
Fuller made his Cup Series debut in 1992, running the No. 88 Pontiac for John and Scott Bandzul at Richmond. He started 30th and finished 29th in the 35-car field after he broke a water pump.

Fuller then made seven starts in 2000 after a number of years on the Busch Series. He was tapped to drive the No. 27 Viagra Pontiac for Eel River Racing. Fuller made six of the first seven races, having a best finish of 22nd at Atlanta and a best start of seventh at Texas, but was released in favor of Mike Bliss. The Eel River team would eventually go through several drivers to include Kenny Wallace and eventually folded due to lack of funding. Later in 2000, Fuller drove the No. 98 MacPherson Motorsports Ford at Charlotte. He made the race with them with a 27th-place start and 41st place finish. The team closed its doors before the 2001 Daytona 500.

Fuller tacked on three starts in 2004, running the No. 50 Arnold Motorsports Dodge in the later stages of the year. He was 43rd at California and Dover and then 42nd at Charlotte. Charlotte was his best start on the year with a 26th-place start.

Fuller made two starts in 2005, when he drove for Mach 1 Racing. However, Fuller finished 43rd in both the races. (Darlington and Dover) His best start was 40th at Darlington.

In 2007, Fuller tested the No. 80 Joe Gibbs Racing Chevy at Daytona.

For 2008, Fuller tested the No. 87 of Front Row Motorsports for the 2008 Daytona 500. In February 2008, Fuller traveled to Afghanistan for a ten-day visit to six camps supporting the US and Coalition Forces.

Fuller was going to drive the No. 97 FrontRowJoe.com Toyota as a second car for NEMCO Motorsports in the 2010 Daytona 500 as a safety-net car for team owner Joe Nemechek should his No. 87 not make the race. When Nemechek's car made the race, Fuller started the duel and quickly pulled it behind the wall. Fuller was also entered in the No. 97 for the 2010 Drive 4 COPD 300, and was in the field after qualifying was washed out, but was paid to withdraw when several cars running the full schedule were locked out of the race.

Fuller was entered for the Aarons 499, but withdrew before qualifying with rain threatening qualifying. Fuller and the 97 were not entered for the Coke Zero 400.

Fuller qualified the No. 97 HeatRedefined.com NEMCO Motorsports Toyota in thirteenth for the 2010 AMP Energy Juice 500 at Talladega. He finished 43rd after only completing two laps. Again, this car was entered as both a safety net car, as well as a financial gain for the 87 as with both cars making the race, and a fully sponsored 87, allowed Nemechek to run the race to completion.

== Personal life ==
Fuller has a daughter named Tiffany Fuller. He then had two more children, daughter Shannon and son Jeffrey Jr.

== Motorsports career results ==
=== NASCAR ===
(key) (Bold – Pole position awarded by qualifying time. Italics – Pole position earned by points standings or practice time. * – Most laps led.)

==== Sprint Cup Series ====
NASCAR Sprint Cup Series results
Year	Team	No.	Make	1	2	3	4	5	6	7	8	9	10	11	12	13	14	15	16	17	18	19	20	21	22	23	24	25	26	27	28	29	30	31	32	33	34	35	36	NSCC	Pts	Ref
1992	Bandzul Racing	88	Pontiac	DAY	CAR	RCH; 29	ATL	DAR	BRI	NWS	MAR	TAL	CLT	DOV	SON	POC	MCH	DAY	POC	TAL	GLN	MCH	BRI	DAR	RCH	DOV	MAR	NWS	CLT	CAR	PHO									77th	76	
1992	Bandzul Racing	08	Pontiac																													ATL; DNQ								77th	76	
2000	Eel River Racing	27	Pontiac	DAY; DNQ	CAR; 42	LVS; 36	ATL; 22	DAR; 36	BRI; 37	TEX; 38	MAR	TAL	CAL	RCH	CLT	DOV	MCH	POC	SON	DAY	NHA	POC	IND	GLN	MCH	BRI	DAR	RCH	NHA	DOV	MAR									53rd	390	
2000	MacPherson Motorsports	98	Ford																													CLT; 41	TAL	CAR	PHO	HOM	ATL			53rd	390	
2004	Arnold Motorsports	50	Dodge	DAY	CAR	LVS	ATL	DAR	BRI	TEX	MAR	TAL	CAL	RCH	CLT	DOV	POC	MCH	SON	DAY	CHI	NHA	POC	IND	GLN	MCH	BRI	CAL; 43	RCH	NHA	DOV; 43	TAL	KAN	CLT; 42	MAR	ATL	PHO	DAR	HOM	75th	105	
2005	Buddy Sisco Racing	61	Dodge	DAY	CAL	LVS	ATL	BRI	MAR; DNQ	TEX	PHO	TAL																												78th	68	
2005	Mach 1 Motorsports	34	Chevy										DAR; 43	RCH; DNQ	CLT; DNQ	DOV; 43	POC	MCH	SON	DAY	CHI	NHA	POC	IND	GLN	MCH	BRI	CAL	RCH	NHA	DOV	TAL	KAN	CLT	MAR	ATL	TEX	PHO	HOM	78th	68	
2010	NEMCO Motorsports	97	Toyota	DAY; DNQ	CAL	LVS	ATL	BRI	MAR	PHO	TEX	TAL	RCH	DAR	DOV	CLT	POC	MCH	SON	NHA	DAY	CHI	IND	POC	GLN	MCH	BRI	ATL	RCH	NHA	DOV	KAN	CAL	CLT	MAR	TAL; 43	TEX	PHO	HOM	74th	34	

===== Daytona 500 =====
Year	Team	Manufacturer	Start	Finish
2000	Eel River Racing	Pontiac	DNQ	
2010	NEMCO Motorsports	Toyota	DNQ	

==== Nationwide Series ====
NASCAR Nationwide Series results
Year	Team	No.	Make	1	2	3	4	5	6	7	8	9	10	11	12	13	14	15	16	17	18	19	20	21	22	23	24	25	26	27	28	29	30	31	32	33	34	35	NNSC	Pts	Ref
1992	Moroso Racing	20	Olds	DAY	CAR	RCH	ATL	MAR	DAR	BRI	HCY	LAN	DUB	NZH	CLT	DOV	ROU	MYB	GLN	VOL	NHA	TAL	IRP	ROU	MCH	NHA	BRI	DAR	RCH	DOV	CLT	MAR	CAR; 26	HCY					114th	85	
1995	ST Motorsports	47	Chevy	DAY; 11	CAR; 30	RCH; 16	ATL; 27	NSV; 20	DAR; 22	BRI; 14	HCY; 7	NHA; 22	NZH; 9	CLT; 15	DOV; 28	MYB; 28	GLN; 15	MLW; 22	TAL; 14	SBO; 11	IRP; 10	MCH; 28	BRI; 10	DAR; 18	RCH; 23	DOV; 21	CLT; 4	CAR; 38	HOM; 8										10th	2845	
1996	ST Motorsports	47	Chevy	DAY; 35	CAR; DNQ	RCH; 24	ATL; DNQ	NSV; 24	DAR; 25	BRI; 10	HCY; 14		CLT; 16	DOV; 27	SBO; 12	MYB; 15	GLN; 33	MLW; 9	NHA; 22	TAL; 8	IRP; 20	MCH; 26	**BRI**; 1*	DAR; 15	RCH; 24	DOV; 20	CLT; DNQ	CAR; 20	HOM; 33										17th	2399	
1996	Ken Wilson	02	Chevy				ATL; 38																																17th	2399	
1996	ST Motorsports	17	Chevy									NZH; 42																											17th	2399	
1997	ST Motorsports	47	Chevy	DAY; 26	CAR; 17	RCH; 35	ATL; 12	LVS; 36	DAR; 7	HCY; 12	TEX; 32	BRI; 29	NSV; 31	TAL; 26	NHA; 3	NZH; 31	CLT; 34	DOV; 26	SBO	GLN																			21st	2515	
1997	Laughin Racing	45	Chevy																		MLW; 30	MYB; 33	GTY; 7	IRP; 22	MCH; 14	BRI; 9	DAR; 41	RCH; 34	DOV; 35	CLT; 43	CAL; 11								21st	2515	
1997	Taylor Motorsports	40	Chevy																													CAR; 40							21st	2515	
1997	Labonte Motorsports	5	Chevy																														HOM; 14						21st	2515	
1998	NorthStar Motorsports	89	Ford	DAY	CAR	LVS	NSV	DAR	BRI	TEX	HCY	TAL	NHA	NZH	CLT; 25	DOV; 35	RCH; 40	PPR; 11	GLN; 18	MLW; 29	MYB	CAL; 40	SBO	IRP; 32	MCH	BRI													48th	899	
1998	Charles Prince	90	Chevy																								DAR; 38	RCH	DOV										48th	899	
1998	Joe Gibbs Racing	42	Pontiac																											CLT; 15	GTY	CAR	ATL						48th	899	
1998	Bill Elliott Racing	94	Chevy																															HOM; 15					48th	899	
1999	NorthStar Motorsports	89	Chevy	DAY; 23	CAR; 42	LVS; 27	ATL; DNQ	DAR; 19	TEX; 26	NSV; 20	BRI; 19	TAL; 32	CAL; 12	NHA; 39	RCH; 41	NZH; 19	CLT; DNQ	DOV; 31	SBO; 20	GLN; 15	MLW; 32	MYB	PPR; 12	GTY; 37	IRP; 12	MCH; 17			RCH; 30	DOV; 43									22nd	2280	
1999	Joe Gibbs Racing	42	Pontiac																								BRI; 20	DAR; 13			CLT; 37	CAR			HOM; 36				22nd	2280	
1999	Team Amick	88	Chevy																														MEM; 33	PHO					22nd	2280	
2000	SABCO Racing	82	Chevy	DAY	CAR	LVS	ATL	DAR	BRI	TEX; DNQ	NSV	TAL	CAL	RCH	NHA	CLT	DOV	SBO	MYB	GLN	MLW	NZH	PPR	GTY	IRP	MCH													96th	100	
2000	PRW Racing	77	Ford																								BRI; 21	DAR	RCH	DOV	CLT	CAR	MEM	PHO	HOM				96th	100	
2001	NEMCO Motorsports	88	Chevy	DAY	CAR	LVS	ATL	DAR	BRI	TEX	NSH	TAL	CAL; 42	RCH	NHA	NZH	CLT	DOV	KEN	MLW	GLN	CHI	GTY	PPR	IRP	MCH	BRI	DAR	RCH	DOV	KAN	CLT	MEM	PHO	CAR	HOM			147th	37	
2002	NEMCO Motorsports	88	Chevy	DAY; 42	CAR	LVS; DNQ	DAR	BRI	TEX	NSH																													105th	80	
2002	NEMCO Motorsports	88	Pontiac								TAL; 40	CAL	RCH	NHA	NZH	CLT	DOV	NSH	KEN	MLW	DAY	CHI	GTY	PPR	IRP	MCH	BRI	DAR	RCH	DOV	KAN	CLT	MEM	ATL	CAR	PHO	HOM		105th	80	
2003	Bost Motorsports	22	Chevy	DAY; 24	CAR	LVS	DAR	BRI	TEX																														54th	688	
2003	NEMCO Motorsports	88	Pontiac							TAL; 43											DAY; 43	CHI	NHA																54th	688	
2003	Stanton Barrett Motorsports	91	Pontiac								NSH; 18	CAL	RCH	GTY	NZH																								54th	688	
2003	NEMCO Motorsports	88	Chevy													CLT; 43	DOV																						54th	688	
2003	NEMCO Motorsports	87	Chevy															NSH; 43	KEN	MLW				PPR; 38	IRP	MCH	BRI; 15	DAR	RCH										54th	688	
2003	Stanton Barrett Motorsports	97	Chevy																											DOV; 41	KAN; 43	CLT; 43	MEM; 40		PHO; DNQ	CAR; 43	HOM		54th	688	
2003	Stanton Barrett Motorsports	91	Chevy																															ATL; DNQ					54th	688	
2004	NEMCO Motorsports	88	Chevy	DAY	CAR; 43	LVS; 43	DAR; 43	BRI; 37	TEX; 39	NSH; 37	TAL; 42	CAL; 40	GTY; 37	RCH; 38	NZH; 35	CLT; 37	DOV; 43	NSH; 43	KEN; 42	MLW; 41		CHI; DNQ	NHA; 43	PPR; 42	IRP; 39	MCH; 41	BRI; 41	CAL; 42	RCH; 42	DOV; 43	KAN; 43	CLT	MEM; 43	ATL; 40	PHO; 43	DAR; 38	HOM; DNQ		37th	1221	
2004	NEMCO Motorsports	88	Pontiac																		DAY; 43																		37th	1221	
2005	NEMCO Motorsports	7	Chevy	DAY; 43	CAL; 43	MXC																																	51st	929	
2005	GIC-Mixon Motorsports	24	Chevy				LVS; DNQ	ATL	NSH	BRI	TEX	PHO	TAL																										51st	929	
2005	GIC-Mixon Motorsports	7	Chevy											DAR; 38	RCH; DNQ	CLT; DNQ	DOV; 25	NSH; 30	KEN; 35	MLW; 41	DAY; DNQ	CHI; DNQ	NHA; 42	PPR; 31	GTY; 35	IRP; 42	GLN	MCH; 39	BRI; DNQ	CAL; DNQ	RCH; 43	DOV; 24	KAN; 34	CLT; 27	MEM; 42	TEX; DNQ	PHO	HOM	51st	929	
2006	Frank Cicci Racing	34	Chevy	DAY	CAL	MXC	LVS	ATL	BRI	TEX	NSH	PHO	TAL	RCH	DAR	CLT	DOV	NSH; 27	KEN; 41	MLW	DAY	CHI	NHA	MAR	GTY	IRP	GLN	MCH	BRI	CAL	RCH	DOV	KAN	CLT	MEM	TEX	PHO	HOM	107th	122	
2007	Stanton Barrett Motorsports	31	Chevy	DAY	CAL	MXC	LVS	ATL	BRI	NSH	TEX	PHO	TAL	RCH	DAR	CLT	DOV	NSH	KEN	MLW	NHA	DAY	CHI	GTY	IRP	CGV	GLN	MCH	BRI	CAL; 38	RCH	DOV	KAN	CLT	MEM	TEX	PHO	HOM	146th	49	
2008	SKI Motorsports	31	Chevy	DAY	CAL	LVS	ATL	BRI	NSH	TEX	PHO	MXC	TAL	RCH	DAR	CLT	DOV	NSH	KEN	MLW	NHA	DAY	CHI	GTY	IRP	CGV; 36	GLN	MCH	BRI	CAL	RCH	DOV	KAN	CLT	MEM	TEX	PHO	HOM	136th	55	
2009	R3 Motorsports	23	Chevy	DAY	CAL	LVS	BRI	TEX	NSH	PHO	TAL	RCH	DAR; 30	CLT	DOV	NSH	KEN	MLW	NHA	DAY	CHI	GTY	IRP																100th	186	
2009	NEMCO Motorsports	87	Chevy																					IOW; 36	GLN	MCH	BRI	CGV	ATL	RCH	DOV	KAN	CAL	CLT	MEM; 35	TEX	PHO	HOM	100th	186	
2010	NEMCO Motorsports	97	Chevy	DAY; Wth	CAL	LVS	BRI	NSH	PHO	TEX	TAL	RCH	DAR	DOV	CLT	NSH	KEN	ROA	NHA	DAY	CHI	GTY	IRP	IOW	GLN	MCH	BRI	CGV	ATL	RCH	DOV	KAN	CAL	CLT	GTY	TEX	PHO	HOM	NA	-	

==== Busch North Series ====
NASCAR Busch North Series results
Year	Team	No.	Make	1	2	3	4	5	6	7	8	9	10	11	12	13	14	15	16	17	18	19	20	21	22	23	24	25	NBNSC	Pts	Ref
1988		6	Olds	DAY	CAR	DAR	NZH	MND	OXF	OXF	DOV	OXF	JEN	CNB	EPP	TIO	OXF	JEN	TMP; 11	IRP	OXF; 28	RPS; 17	DAR	RCH	DOV	OXF	OXF	EPP	40th	348	
1994	Greci Motorsports	51	Chevy	NHA	NHA	MND	NZH	SPE	HOL	GLN	JEN	EPP	GLN	NHA	WIS	STA	TMP; 8	MND	WMM	RPS	LEE	NHA	LRP						63rd	142	
1996	ST Motorsports	94	Chevy	DAY	LEE	JEN	NZH	HOL	NHA	TIO	BEE	TMP	NZH	NHA	STA	GLN	EPP	RPS	LEE	NHA	NHA	BEE	TMP; 1	LRP					71st	180	
1997	Ocean Spray Racing	60	Chevy	DAY	LEE	JEN	NHA	NZH	HOL	NHA	STA	BEE	TMP	NZH	TIO	NHA	STA	THU	GLN	EPP	RPS	BEE	TMP; 30	NHA	LRP				92nd	73	
1999		81		LEE	RPS	NHA; DNQ	TMP	NZH	HOL	BEE	JEN	GLN	STA	NHA	NZH	STA	NHA	GLN; DNQ	EPP	THU	BEE	NHA	LRP						N/A	-	

==== Whelen Southern Modified Tour ====
NASCAR Whelen Southern Modified Tour results
Year	Car owner	No.	Make	1	2	3	4	5	6	7	8	9	10	11	12	13	14	NSWMTC	Pts	Ref
2011	Ed Marceau	66	Ford	CRW	HCY	SBO	CRW	CRW	BGS	BRI	CRW	LGY	THO; 22	TRI	CRW	CLT	CRW	45th	97	

Sporting positions
Preceded by Mike Stefanik	NASCAR Winston Modified Tour Champion; 1992	Succeeded by Rick Fuller
