= GIC–Mixon Motorsports =

Former American stock car racing team

GIC-Mixon Motorsports
- Owner(s): James Whitener, Gregg Mixon
- Base: North Carolina
- Series: Nextel Cup Series; Busch Series
- Manufacturer: Chevrolet
- Opened: 2001
- Closed: 2005

Career
- Drivers' Championships: 0
- Race victories: 0

GIC–Mixon Motorsports was a NASCAR team, owners of the Nos. 7 and 24 Chevrolets in the NASCAR Busch Series. At the end of 2005, they began to run a part-time schedule. As they did not run in 2006, it is presumed that this team had sold off its equipment.

Owners Whitener and Mixon would return to racing in 2014 as JGL Racing.

== Busch program ==
=== Mike Harmon era (2001–04) ===
The team began with No. 44 and driver Mike Harmon. Although Gregg Mixon had some previous owning experience, his official debut as a Busch Series owner was at Nashville. With sponsorship from Mixon's company GIC, Harmon was able to qualify 41st. 68 laps into the event, Harmon crashed leaving the team's debut with a 40th-place finish. The team returned at Nazareth bettering Nashville with a 37th place start and a 38th-place finish, falling out with transmission troubles. After that came a 38th at Dover Downs, a 36th at Milwaukee, 40th at Pikes Peak and 33rd at Gateway. The team had its best performance of 2001 at IRP. After starting 38th, Harmon completed 95% of the laps and finished in 28th position. Not only was it a new career high for Mixon's team, but it was the first race that they ever finished (and in fact the only one the team finished in 2001). The team ran 7 more races, with the best finish coming at Darlington.

In 2002, the team made plans to run the full schedule. The team made 25 of the 34 races, all with Harmon driving the car. Much like 2001, it was a very turbulent season for Mixon and Harmon. They only finished three races, did not qualify (DNQ) for nine. The most memorable part of the season for the team occurred during a Thursday practice at Bristol. Harmon lost control of his Chevrolet and hit the guardrail. The guardrail, not properly closed, split Harmon's car in half. Amazingly, Harmon walked away. After that, the team finished 43rd the following night. There were some bright spots for 2002, however. The team set its career best qualifying effort at Loudon and matched its best effort of 28th at Fontana. The team also had some support from COX Communications for 2002.

2003 was the best year of GIC-Mixon's career. Harmon set the team career best finish with a 23rd right of the bat at Daytona. The team gained sponsorship from FanZ Car for the second half of the season and that support immediately showed. Harmon qualified a team-record 20th at Kentucky. Then a streak began in which Harmon finished in the top-28 for 5 races, stretching from July to August. That was capped with a 20th-place finish at Indianapolis Raceway Park. Harmon made all but two races, and finished 23rd in points, the highest position for Mixon and crew.

With Justin Labonte's team wanting the No. 44, Harmon and Mixon switched numbers to No. 24. The team did not qualify for Daytona or Las Vegas, but did make 3 of the first 5 races, with a two-30s. However, the team began struggling to get into the field. By the eighth race of the season, Harmon had only qualified for half the races and was let go.

=== Hmiel takes the wheel (2004) ===
Shane Hmiel, who was coming off a drug suspension, was driving in the Craftsman Truck Series for Billy Ballew Motorsports. Hmiel was willing to take the wheel, however, of the GIC-Mixon car for some free weekends during the spring. This allowed the team to have its best runs ever. After qualifying 32nd and finishing there at Fontana, Hmiel qualified in 18th, setting a team record, at Gateway. He was running in the top-15 when his engine blew.

With Hmiel busy for a weekend, Todd Bodine got behind the wheel of the No. 24 at Richmond International Raceway. The team had a new sponsor, as well. FanZ Car had left after 2003, and Quality Plus Services signed on to be the primary sponsor for the rest of the year. Bodine and the team had a good run at Richmond, qualifying 27th and finishing 24th.

Hmiel was back in the car for the next two races and qualifying well. He started 18th at Dover Downs and 19th at Charlotte. However, Hmiel wrecked out of both races while running mid-pack.

Aaron Fike took the wheel for a race at Nashville. Despite starting 43rd, Aaron, a relatively inexperienced rookie, completed 92 laps and was running well, before overheating took him to a 36th-place finish.

=== Grissom takes the wheel (2004) ===
With Mixon's team still struggling to make races, Mixon hired Steve Grissom. Grissom was the 1993 Busch Series Champion. Grissom then had the advantage of the past champion's provisional, which allowed the most recent champion of the series to start the race automatically. With all other recent champions not running the series or in other good rides, GIC-Mixon was practically guaranteed of making the rest of the races. The first race for Grissom went extremely well. Grissom used the past champion's provisional (43rd place start) and finished in 20th at Kentucky.

Thus began the team's strongest run during its career. Grissom was 26th at Milwaukee, 28th at Chicago, 23rd at Loudon, 30th at Pikes Peak and 28th at IRP. Two weeks after IRP, Grissom finished 25th at Bristol. At Richmond, Mixon picked up Panasonic sponsorship, and Grissom finished 26th. However, after that the team struggled for the rest of the year. For four straight weeks, the team finished outside of the top-35. The last highlight for the team of 2004 was a 24th at Darlington. Also at Phoenix, the team had two cars in the race. One was for Jason Jefferson, who made his debut and Grissom made the race in the No. 93 Chevrolet Monte Carlo.

=== Big Boar and Butt Paste (2005) ===
With Steve Grissom leaving to Jay Robinson Racing, the seat was open. Kim Crosby, one of the few female drivers in NASCAR, got the job. She would drive the No. 24 Boudreaux's Butt Paste Chevy for 2005.

However, that deal quickly fell south. Crosby did not qualify for the first three races of the season. Faced with a tough schedule, Mixon contacted Joe Nemechek about buying the No. 7 Chevy. The No. 7 was guaranteed in the field for two more races, and Crosby would be able to race. At Las Vegas, Crosby was in the No. 7 with Butt Paste sponsorship. Jeff Fuller attempted to qualify for that race in the typical No. 24. However, the Big Boar Customs Chevy did not qualify. Crosby did race. She qualified 42nd and finished 39th after she wrecked on the 78th lap. The next week at Atlanta Motor Speedway, Crosby had transmission problems, finishing 35th.

With the guarantee of being in the field gone, Crosby was released and Mark Green was asked to drive the car. Green had considerable experience and Mixon viewed Green as the best driver for the team. Green qualified for his two races with the team. He finished 40th at Nashville and then a solid 23rd finish at Bristol.

With Mark moving onto other opportunities, Mixon looked for a new driver of the No. 7 Butt Paste Chevy. Greg Sacks did not qualify for Talladega and at Phoenix, Scott Gaylord raced the No. 7.

Jeff Fuller was then brought in for the rest of the year. The sponsorship with Boudreaux's also ended in early 2005. With new sponsor, Big Boar, back on the cars Fuller qualified for the majority of the races he tried. In most, he had a better start than some drivers with better funding. At Lowe's Motor Speedway in October, he started inside of Dale Earnhardt Jr. Jeff also had some good finishes. He was 25th and 24th in two races at Dover Downs. At Charlotte in October, he finished 27th. Also, Brad Teague drove a second Mixon car, the No. 24 Eagle Jet International Chevy at Milwaukee and New Hampshire. In both those races, the team started and parked, finishing 43rd in both.

However, Big Boar wasn't able to fully finance the team. With some issues beginning to show in the money department, Gregg Mixon made the tough decision. The team was moving to a limited schedule. After the race at Memphis, the team made one attempt and did not qualify.

==== Car No. 7 results ====
Year	Driver	No.	Make	1	2	3	4	5	6	7	8	9	10	11	12	13	14	15	16	17	18	19	20	21	22	23	24	25	26	27	28	29	30	31	32	33	34	35	Owners	Pts
2002	Rick Markle	72	Chevy	DAY	CAR	LVS	DAR	BRI	TEX	NSH	TAL	CAL	RCH	NHA	NZH; 42	CLT	DOV	NSH	KEN	MLW	DAY	CHI	GTY	PPR	IRP	MCH	BRI	DAR	RCH	DOV	KAN	CLT	MEM	ATL	CAR				100th	28
2002	Jimmy Kitchens	72	Chevy																																	PHO; DNQ	HOM		100th	28
2003	Jimmy Kitchens	41	Chevy	DAY	CAR	LVS	DAR	BRI	TEX	TAL	NSH	CAL	RCH	GTY	NZH	CLT	DOV	NSH	KEN	MLW	DAY	CHI	NHA	PPR	IRP	MCH	BRI	DAR	RCH	DOV; DNQ	KAN	CLT	MEM	ATL	PHO	CAR	HOM		117th	13
2004	Steve Grissom	93	Chevy	DAY	CAR	LVS	DAR	BRI	TEX	NSH	TAL	CAL	GTY	RCH	NZH	CLT	DOV	NSH	KEN	MLW	DAY	CHI	NHA	PPR	IRP	MCH	BRI	CAL	RCH	DOV	KAN	CLT	MEM	ATL	PHO; 25	DAR	HOM		93rd	88
2005	Kim Crosby	7	Chevy	DAY	CAL	MXC	LVS; 39	ATL; 35																															42nd	1623
2005	Mark Green	7	Chevy						NSH; 40	BRI; 23	TEX; DNQ																												42nd	1623
2005	Scott Gaylord	7	Chevy									PHO; 31																											42nd	1623
2005	Greg Sacks	7	Chevy										TAL; DNQ																										42nd	1623
2005	Jeff Fuller	7	Chevy											DAR; 38	RCH; DNQ	CLT; DNQ	DOV; 25	NSH; 30	KEN; 35	MLW; 41	DAY; DNQ	CHI; DNQ	NHA; 42	PPR; 31	GTY; 35	IRP; 42		MCH; 39	BRI; DNQ	CAL; DNQ	RCH; 43	DOV; 24	KAN; 34	CLT; 27	MEM; 42	TEX; DNQ	PHO	HOM	42nd	1623
2005	Chris Cook	7	Chevy																								GLN; 24												42nd	1623

==== Car No. 24 results ====
Year	Driver	No.	Make	1	2	3	4	5	6	7	8	9	10	11	12	13	14	15	16	17	18	19	20	21	22	23	24	25	26	27	28	29	30	31	32	33	34	35	Owners	Pts
2001	Mike Harmon	44	Pontiac	DAY	CAR	LVS	ATL	DAR	BRI	TEX; DNQ	NSH; 40	TAL	CAL	RCH	NHA																								48th	687
2001	Mike Harmon	44	Chevy													NZH; 38	CLT	DOV; 38	KEN; DNQ	MLW; 36	GLN	CHI; DNQ	GTY; 33	PPR; 40	IRP; 28	MCH; 41	BRI	DAR; 35	RCH	DOV; 42	KAN	CLT; 43	MEM; 40	PHO; 41	CAR; 38	HOM; DNQ			48th	687
2002	Mike Harmon	44	Chevy	DAY; DNQ	CAR; 42	LVS; DNQ	DAR; 35	BRI; 42	TEX; DNQ	NSH; 41	TAL; 39	CAL; 28	RCH; 29	NHA; 34	NZH; 37	CLT	DOV; 35	NSH; 40	KEN; 40	MLW; 34	DAY; 22	CHI; 33	GTY; 42	PPR; 32	IRP; 41	MCH; DNQ	BRI; 43	DAR; 34	RCH; DNQ	DOV; 40	KAN; 41	CLT; DNQ	MEM; DNQ	ATL; 39	CAR; 36	PHO; 39	HOM; DNQ		40th	1455
2003	Mike Harmon	44	Chevy	DAY; 23	CAR; 30	LVS; 43	DAR; 35	BRI; 40	TEX; 23	TAL; 34	NSH; 22	CAL; 39	RCH; 43	GTY; 30	NZH; 28	CLT; 41	DOV; 33	NSH; 38	KEN; 35	MLW; 33	DAY; 25	CHI; 22	NHA; 28	PPR; 22	IRP; 20	MCH; 31	BRI; 23	DAR; 27	RCH; 32	DOV; 33	KAN; 28	CLT; DNQ	MEM; 36	ATL; 30	PHO; 39	CAR; 37	HOM; DNQ		29th	2245
2004	Mike Harmon	24	Chevy	DAY; DNQ	CAR; 30	LVS; 39	DAR; 29	BRI; 41	TEX	NSH; DNQ	TAL; 35										DAY; DNQ																		31st	1967
2004	Shane Hmiel	24	Chevy									CAL; 32	GTY; 28			CLT; 35	DOV; 41																						31st	1967
2004	Todd Bodine	24	Chevy											RCH; 24	NZH																								31st	1967
2004	Aaron Fike	24	Chevy															NSH; 36																					31st	1967
2004	Steve Grissom	24	Chevy																KEN; 20	MLW; 24		CHI; 28	NHA; 23	PPR; 30	IRP; 28	MCH; 43	BRI; 25	CAL; 43	RCH; 26	DOV; 33	KAN; 36	CLT; 37	MEM; 41	ATL; 39		DAR; 24	HOM; 36		31st	1967
2004	Jason Jefferson	24	Chevy																																PHO; 41				31st	1967
2005	Kim Crosby	24	Chevy	DAY; DNQ	CAL; DNQ	MXC; DNQ																																	67th	205
2005	Jeff Fuller	24	Chevy				LVS; DNQ																																67th	205
2005	Blake Mallory	24	Chevy					ATL; DNQ	NSH; DNQ	BRI	TEX	PHO	TAL	DAR	RCH	CLT	DOV	NSH	KEN																				67th	205
2005	Brad Teague	24	Chevy																	MLW; 43	DAY	CHI	NHA; 43	PPR; DNQ	GTY	IRP	GLN	MCH	BRI	CAL	RCH	DOV	KAN	CLT					67th	205
2005	Mike Harmon	24	Chevy																																MEM; DNQ	TEX	PHO	HOM	67th	205

== Cup program ==
During 2002, Gregg Mixon began at looking to start a Winston Cup Series team with Harmon driving. The No. 93 GIC Ford took to the track for the first time at Phoenix. They did not qualify for that race. Nor did they qualify for the following race at Homestead-Miami.

With the Busch program struggling to stay afloat, Mixon scaled the Cup operation down. They would refrain from attempting any Cup races until sponsorship problems were cleared up,

In 2004, Mixon was ready to try again. Geoff Bodine attempted the No. 93 in the last 3 races of the 2004 season. However, he had the same result as with Harmon. The team made none of those races.

In 2005, the team used Bodine to get into the Budweiser Shootout, an all-star race for pole winners. Bodine was locked in and guaranteed in the show. However, the race did not go well. Bodine immediately lost the lead draft and finished last in the event.

That would be the only race the Cup team would ever make. Since the Budweiser Shootout was an exhibition race, Mixon and GIC are not considered to be Cup owners. With the Busch team falling apart, by 2006, it appears the Shootout would be the only time the car would be on the track.

=== Car No. 93 results ===
Year	Driver	No.	Make	1	2	3	4	5	6	7	8	9	10	11	12	13	14	15	16	17	18	19	20	21	22	23	24	25	26	27	28	29	30	31	32	33	34	35	36	Owners	Pts
2002	Mike Harmon	93	Ford	DAY	CAR	LVS	ATL	DAR	BRI	TEX	MAR	TAL	CAL	RCH	CLT	DOV	POC	MCH	SON	DAY	CHI	NHA	POC	IND	GLN	MCH	BRI	DAR	RCH	NHA	DOV	KAN	TAL	CLT	MAR	ATL	CAR	PHO; Wth	HOM; DNQ	74th	20
2004	Geoff Bodine	93	Chevy	DAY	CAR	LVS	ATL	DAR	BRI	TEX	MAR	TAL	CAL	RCH	CLT	DOV	POC	MCH	SON	DAY	CHI	NHA	POC	IND	GLN	MCH	BRI	CAL	RCH	NHA	DOV	TAL	KAN	CLT	MAR	ATL	PHO; DNQ	DAR	HOM; Wth	77th	13
2005	Geoff Bodine	93	Chevy	DAY; DNQ	CAL	LVS	ATL	BRI	MAR	TEX	PHO	TAL	DAR	RCH	CLT	DOV	POC	MCH	SON	DAY	CHI	NHA	POC	IND	GLN	MCH	BRI	CAL	RCH	NHA	DOV	TAL	KAN	CLT	MAR	ATL	TEX	PHO	HOM	74th	1
