= Eddie Troconis =

Mexican racing driver (born 1979)

- Nationality: (Mexico) Mexican
- Born: Carlos Eduardo Trocon Ortiz; June 12, 1979 (age 47) Veracruz, Veracruz
- Relatives: Jennifer Jo Cobb (wife)

Previous series
- ???: Indy Lights; NASCAR Mexico Series

NASCAR O'Reilly Auto Parts Series career
- 0 races run over 1 year
- 2006 position: N/A
- Best finish: N/A (2006)
Wins	Top tens	Poles
0	0	0
- Statistics up to date as of August 31, 2022.

Carlos Eduardo Trocon Ortiz (born June 12, 1979), known professionally as Eddie Troconis, is a Mexican stock car racing crew chief who works for Young's Motorsports, serving as crew chief of the team's No. 02 car in the NASCAR O'Reilly Auto Parts Series. Before becoming a crew chief, Troconis was previously a driver, and competed in the NASCAR Mexico Series and also attempted to qualify for one race in the O'Reilly Auto Parts Series in 2006, when it was known as the NASCAR Busch Series.

Prior to driving and crew chiefing in NASCAR, Troconis drove in the Indy Lights, Formula Three, and Formula Vee Series.

== Racing career ==
=== Driving career ===
Troconis is a two-time Mexican Formula Three International champion (winning titles in 1999 and 2002) and a Rookie of the Year Award winner in the Formula Vee Series (1995) and Indy Lights de las Americas (2000). Troconis also competed in the NASCAR Toyota Series and Desafío Corona Series.

Troconis attempted one Busch Series race in 2006 driving the No. 23 for Keith Coleman Racing at Watkins Glen, but failed to qualify.

=== Crew chiefing career ===
==== 2012–2013: Jennifer Jo Cobb Racing and Eddie Sharp Racing ====
Troconis' first crew chief job was in 2012 when he crew chiefed the No. 13 Jennifer Jo Cobb Racing team in the Nationwide Series. When Cobb decided to focus on her Truck Series operation that year, the team did not attempt any races for many months and he joined Eddie Sharp Racing as Justin Lofton's engineer on the No. 6 truck and starting at Talladega in October, he replaced Daniel Bormann as the team's crew chief. The following year, he was only crew chief for the team in the season-opener at Daytona before being replaced by Cody Sauls.

==== 2014–2018: Kyle Busch Motorsports and ThorSport Racing ====
When Sharp's team closed down after the 2013 season, Troconis moved over to Kyle Busch Motorsports as an engineer, and was promoted to crew chief of their No. 54 truck, driven by Christopher Bell, Gray Gaulding, and Matt Tifft, towards the end of the 2015 season when Shannon Rursch left the team. KBM shut down the No. 54 truck in 2016, and Troconis went to ThorSport Racing to crew chief Cameron Hayley and the No. 13 truck. After all of their drivers except for Matt Crafton had winless seasons and missed the playoffs in 2016, ThorSport shook up their crew chief lineup the following year and Troconis moved from the No. 13 to the No. 27 of Ben Rhodes. He and Rhodes did qualify for the playoffs and they won the race at Las Vegas that year. Their race-winning truck from that race was nicknamed "marshmellow", as it was one of the trucks that was burned in ThorSport's shop fire in 2015 but rebuilt afterward.

The two remained together in 2018, and they won another race at Kentucky, Rhodes' home track, which qualified them for the playoffs for the second straight year. Also that year, Troconis was suspended for one race at Dover due to Rhodes' truck failing post-race inspection at the Daytona race earlier in the year and losing the appeal to the penalty. He was also fined $5,000. Bud Haefele served as the interim crew chief for the team in Troconis' absence.

==== 2019–2020: AM Racing and Sam Hunt Racing ====
In 2019, Troconis left ThorSport after three years with the team, going to AM Racing as the crew chief for the No. 22 truck driven by Austin Wayne Self.

Towards the end of the 2020 Truck Series season, Troconis would leave AM Racing for Sam Hunt Racing, a part-time team in the NASCAR Xfinity Series, to crew chief Mason Diaz in the team's No. 26 Toyota Supra. Ryan Salomon would replace Troconis at AM Racing for the last four races of the season.

==== 2021–present: Young's Motorsports, DGM Racing, suspension and arrest ====
In 2021, Sam Hunt Racing replaced Troconis with former Jeremy Clements Racing crew chief Andrew Abbott, leaving Troconis looking for work. He joined Young's Motorsports as crew chief of for the team's No. 02 in the Truck Series, which for the majority of the season was driven by Kris Wright. He would also be the crew chief of the team's No. 02 car in the ARCA Menards Series and ARCA Menards Series East whenever Connor Mosack was the driver of the car. In addition, Troconis was one of a rotation of crew chiefs for DGM Racing in the Xfinity Series in 2021, crew chiefing their Nos. 90 and No. 92 cars in select races throughout the season. On October 6, NASCAR indefinitely suspended Troconis for violation of Section 12.8.1.c in the rulebook, which relates to behavioral conduct. On December 21, an arrest warrant was issued to Troconis on felony second degree assault charges. He turned himself in to the Talladega County Sheriff's Deputies Office on January 5, 2022 and is facing between one and ten years in jail if convicted. Through this, it was revealed that Troconis had been suspended because he was involved in a fight with spotter Clayton Hughes during the race weekend at Talladega in October. According to the sheriff's office, Troconis sucker punched him in the neck which led him to fall to the ground, where Troconis then kicked him in the back multiple times. Hughes had to undergo several surgeries and was unable to walk after the incident.

Troconis was reinstated before the 2022 season after the charges were dropped by a prosecutor in February. He returned as crew chief of the Young's Motorsports No. 02 truck, now driven by Jesse Little and Kaz Grala. On March 24, 2022, NASCAR indefinitely suspended Troconis again after he was re-arrested on March 18 as a result of his assault charge being re-instated by a grand jury in Alabama. Steven Dawson has served as the interim crew chief for the No. 02 truck since Troconis' suspension started.

On December 7, 2022, Troconis was convicted of second-degree assault in relation to the incident.

== Personal life ==
Troconis is the husband of Truck Series driver Jennifer Jo Cobb. Troconis was the crew chief for Cobb and her race team in the Xfinity Series in 2012. They married in 2015. They had been separated at the time of Troconis' assault on Hughes, who had reportedly been dating Cobb.

Troconis was instrumental in helping KBM driver Daniel Suárez learn more English when he first came to drive for the team in 2015. Troconis happened to be the engineer for KBM's No. 51 truck that year, which is the truck Suárez drove in his part-time schedule with KBM. The two Mexicans working together came in handy, and Suárez sharpened his English-speaking skills as the season went on with Troconis' help.

Troconis earned degrees in mechanical engineering, business management, and a master's degree in marketing.

== Motorsports career results ==
=== NASCAR ===
(key) (Bold – Pole position awarded by qualifying time. Italics – Pole position earned by points standings or practice time. * – Most laps led.)

==== Busch Series ====
NASCAR Busch Series results
Year	Team	No.	Make	1	2	3	4	5	6	7	8	9	10	11	12	13	14	15	16	17	18	19	20	21	22	23	24	25	26	27	28	29	30	31	32	33	34	35	NBSC	Pts	Ref
2006	Keith Coleman Racing	23	Ford	DAY	CAL	MXC	LVS	ATL	BRI	TEX	NSH	PHO	TAL	RCH	DAR	CLT	DOV	NSH	KEN	MLW	DAY	CHI	NHA	MAR	GTY	IRP	GLN; DNQ	MCH	BRI	CAL	RCH	DOV	KAN	CLT	MEM	TEX	PHO	HOM	N/A	0	
