= Boudreaux's Butt Paste =

American brand of diaper rash ointment

Boudreaux's Butt Paste

Boudreaux's Butt Paste is an American brand of skin cream that began as a remedy for diaper rash. It has also been used for the treatment of various skin ailments including psoriasis, jock itch, shingles, chafing, cold sores and acne.

== Background ==
The product was created in the 1970s by George Lloyd Boudreaux of Covington, Louisiana, while he was working as an intern pharmacist. He continued to work on the formula after becoming a licensed pharmacist and sold it at his pharmacy, later naming it "Boudreaux's Butt Paste" after a physician told him a story about a patient who had referred to the product as such.

Boudreaux began distributing the product more extensively after he sold his pharmacy in 1974. Manufacturing moved from Alabama to New Orleans in 2004. After Oprah Winfrey recommended the product on her show the response was so great that the company's website crashed, and demand for Boudreaux's Butt Paste quadrupled. When Brad Pitt talked of a "horrible diaper rash" in two of his children, a People magazine article asked readers for advice. It reported that in under five hours almost 900 readers responded, recommending Boudreaux's Butt Paste "overwhelmingly".

In August 2005, a 14-foot (4.3 m) tide caused by Hurricane Katrina hit the area where Boudreaux's Butt Paste was manufactured, so emergency production was moved to Blairex Laboratories Inc. Soon after, the brand was sold to Blairex in Columbus, Indiana. After the sale, Boudreaux continued to work in Covington to work on marketing and developing new products based upon Butt Paste. Blairex focused on manufacturing and distribution.

On December 29, 2011, Blairex sold the brand to C.B. Fleet Company, Inc.

The brand became a NASCAR sponsor beginning with a Junie Donlavey-owned car driven by Kevin Ray in the Nextel Cup Series and Kim Crosby's #24 Butt Paste Chevrolet, run by GIC-Mixon Motorsports in the Busch Series. A NASCAR spokesman said to USA Today: "I think it's very fitting that Junie Donlavey, who has brought more drivers into the world of NASCAR than any other owner, is now being sponsored by a baby product."

In 2008, due to Boudreaux's Butt Paste ads on the car, Ray's No. 90 Ford was named the fifth scariest NASCAR paint scheme of all time by ESPN The Magazine for having "'BUTT PASTE' slapped on the rear quarter panels in giant red lettering and a cartoon baby riding on the hood."

On December 22, 2016, Prestige Brands announced an agreement to acquire C.B. Fleet Company, Inc., a portfolio company of Gryphon Investors. This was the fifth transaction in which middle-market investment banking firm TM Capital served as a financial advisor to Fleet Laboratories.

== Ingredients ==
The ingredients are:

- 16 percent zinc oxide (Original, other versions have more)
- a proprietary blend of Peruvian balsam
- castor oil
- mineral oil
- Paraffin
- Petrolatum
