= Kim Crosby (racing driver) =

American stock car racing and monster truck driver

- Born: December 8, 1964 (age 61); Tallahassee, Florida, U.S.

NASCAR O'Reilly Auto Parts Series career
- 10 races run over 3 years
- Best finish: 72nd (2004)
- First race: 2004 Aaron's 312 (Talladega)
- Last race: 2006 AT&T 250 (Milwaukee)
Wins	Top tens	Poles
0	0	0
- Statistics up to date as of March 3, 2013.

Kim Crosby (born December 8, 1964) is an American stock car racing driver, professional driving instructor, and monster truck driver. She is a former competitor in the NASCAR Busch Series and the ARCA Re/Max Series.

== Career ==
Before she became a NASCAR driver, Crosby served as a middle school principal in Slidell, Louisiana, resigning in December 2004 to focus full-time on her racing career. Kim has a master's degree in Educational Administration.

Crosby originally was a drag racer, competing in the NHRA and IHRA for fifteen years. She began oval racing in 2000 at the Buck Baker Driving School, where she graduated in the advanced class. She would later return to work at the school as an instructor at the school's satellites at Bristol Motor Speedway, Atlanta Motor Speedway, and Darlington Raceway. She also ran the Florida Fast Trucks Series. Crosby has also completed the Advanced Driving School at Bob Bondurant School of High Performance Driving.

In 2003, Crosby made her debut in the ARCA RE/MAX Series, where her best finish came in her first start, a 21st at Kentucky Speedway. She ran two more races that year in the ARCA Series. In 2004, she was signed to drive the No. 28 for Black Cat Racing, but left the team during Speedweeks. She ended up making her Busch Series debut at Talladega Superspeedway, finishing 20th in the No. 51 Boudreaux's Butt Paste Dodge owned by Ware Racing Enterprises. She ran three more races for Ware that season, her best finish coming in her Talladega debut. She closed out the year running for ORTEC Motorsports, finishing 38th at the Aaron's 312.

Crosby signed to drive for GIC-Mixon Motorsports in 2005, driving the No. 24 Butt Paste Chevrolet. Her best finish with this team was a 35th at Atlanta Motor Speedway. By mid-season, she left GIC and signed to drive the No. 26 Chevrolet for Keith Coleman Racing, finishing 28th at Daytona International Speedway. After a very tumultuous time with KCR, Crosby resigned from the team to pursue other opportunities.

In 2006, it was announced Crosby would run a part-time schedule for Frank Cicci Racing with Jim Kelly. She made her first and only start for the team in June at the Milwaukee Mile, starting 41st after crashing the ill-handling car during qualifying, then finishing 40th after suffering electrical problems and being forced to the garage early in the race. The team shut down shortly thereafter due to business and sponsorship issues, allowing Kim only the one ill-fated start for the team.

In 2008, Crosby was listed as one of the drivers for the No. 15 truck for Billy Ballew Motorsports in the NASCAR Craftsman Truck Series as a teammate to Kyle Busch. Sponsorship never materialized, however, and Crosby was unable to make a start for the team.

As of 2009, Crosby has been a driver for Monster Jam, piloting the monster trucks known as Monster Mutt Dalmatian and Madusa (normally driven by fellow extreme athlete Debrah Miceli) in Central America as part of Monster Jam's World Tour. She continues to pursue sponsorship for her own Monster Jam theme truck and plans to reenter the NASCAR ranks if the right opportunity arises.

Crosby is an avid outdoorswoman. When not racing, she prefers to be hunting, fishing, hiking, kayaking and camping. She currently resides in Kentucky.

== Motorsports career results ==
=== NASCAR ===
(key) (Bold – Pole position awarded by qualifying time. Italics – Pole position earned by points standings or practice time. * – Most laps led.)

==== Busch Series ====
NASCAR Busch Series results
Year	Team	No.	Make	1	2	3	4	5	6	7	8	9	10	11	12	13	14	15	16	17	18	19	20	21	22	23	24	25	26	27	28	29	30	31	32	33	34	35	NBSC	Pts	Ref
2004	Drew White Racing	28	Pontiac	DAY; DNQ	CAR	LVS	DAR	BRI	TEX	NSH																													72nd	314	
2004	Rick Ware Racing	51	Dodge								TAL; 20	CAL	GTY	RCH	NZH	CLT	DOV	NSH	KEN	MLW	DAY; 31	CHI	NHA	PPR; 40	IRP														72nd	314	
2004	Rick Ware Racing	51	Chevy																							MCH; 38	BRI	CAL	RCH	DOV	KAN	CLT	MEM						72nd	314	
2004	Ortec Racing	96	Chevy																															ATL; 38	PHO	DAR	HOM		72nd	314	
2005	GIC–Mixon Motorsports	24	Chevy	DAY; DNQ	CAL; DNQ	MXC; DNQ																																	89th	229	
2005	GIC–Mixon Motorsports	7	Chevy				LVS; 39	ATL; 35	NSH	BRI	TEX	PHO	TAL	DAR	RCH	CLT	DOV	NSH	KEN	MLW																			89th	229	
2005	Keith Coleman Racing	26	Chevy																		DAY; 28	CHI; DNQ	NHA; DNQ	PPR; 39	GTY; DNQ	IRP; DNQ	GLN; DNQ	MCH; DNQ	BRI	CAL; DNQ	RCH	DOV	KAN; DNQ	CLT; DNQ	MEM	TEX	PHO	HOM	89th	229	
2006	Frank Cicci Racing	34	Chevy	DAY	CAL	MXC	LVS	ATL	BRI	TEX	NSH	PHO	TAL	RCH	DAR	CLT	DOV	NSH	KEN	MLW; 40	DAY	CHI	NHA	MAR	GTY	IRP	GLN	MCH	BRI	CAL	RCH	DOV	KAN	CLT	MEM	TEX	PHO	HOM	140th	43	

=== ARCA Re/Max Series ===
(key) (Bold – Pole position awarded by qualifying time. Italics – Pole position earned by points standings or practice time. * – Most laps led.)

ARCA Re/Max Series results
Year	Team	No.	Make	1	2	3	4	5	6	7	8	9	10	11	12	13	14	15	16	17	18	19	20	21	22	ARMC	Pts	Ref
2003	Kim Crosby	00	Chevy	DAY	ATL; DNQ	NSH	SLM	TOL									NSH; 23	ISF	WIN	DSF	CHI	SLM				88th	295	
2003	Wayne Peterson Racing	06	Chevy						KEN; 21	CLT	BLN	KAN	MCH	LER	POC	POC							TAL; 35	CLT	SBO	88th	295	
2004	Wayne Peterson Racing	06	Chevy	DAY; 39	NSH	SLM	KEN	TOL	CLT	KAN	POC	MCH	SBO	BLN	KEN	GTW	POC	LER	NSH	ISF	TOL	DSF	CHI	SLM		179th	60	
2004	Wayne Peterson Racing	16	Pontiac																						TAL; DNQ	179th	60	
