= Stanton Barrett =

American racing driver and stuntman (born 1972)

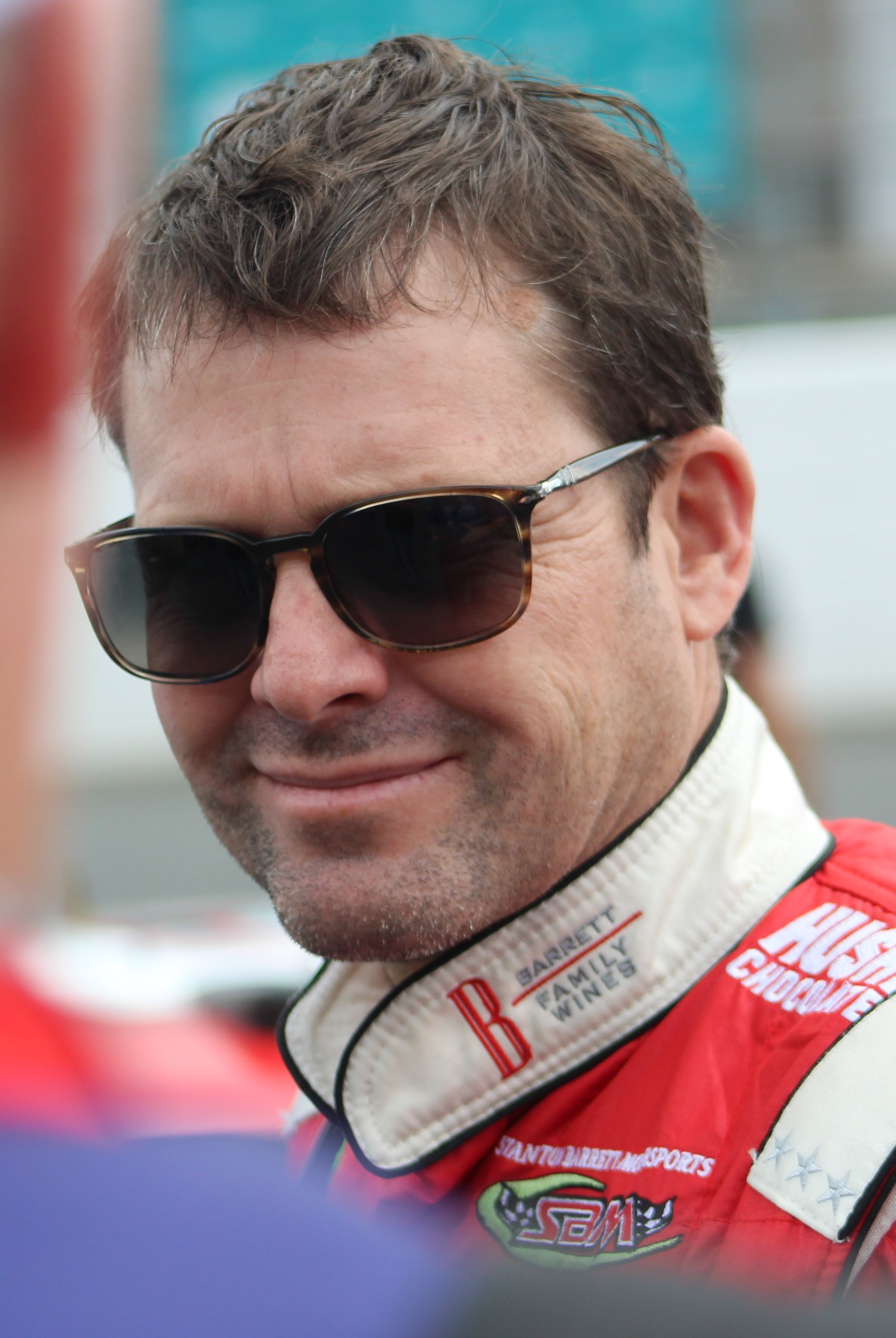
- Barrett at Charlotte Motor Speedway in 2018
- Born: Stanton Thomas Barrett; December 1, 1972 (age 53); Bishop, California, U.S.

NASCAR Cup Series career
- 25 races run over 7 years
- 2020 position: 38th
- Best finish: 38th (2020)
- First race: 1999 Las Vegas 400 (Las Vegas)
- Last race: 2020 Go Bowling 235 (Daytona RC)
Wins	Top tens	Poles
0	0	0

NASCAR O'Reilly Auto Parts Series career
- 206 races run over 26 years
- 2019 position: 97th
- Best finish: 22nd (2005, 2008)
- First race: 1992 Food City 250 (Bristol)
- Last race: 2023 Shriners Children's 200 at The Glen (Watkins Glen)
Wins	Top tens	Poles
0	7	2

NASCAR FedEx Freight Truck Series career
- 1 race run over 1 year
- 2015 position: 104th
- Best finish: 104th (2015)
- First race: 2015 Fred's 250 (Talladega)
Wins	Top tens	Poles
0	0	0

ARCA Menards Series career
- 8 races run over 5 years
- Best finish: 51st (2022)
- First race: 1995 Hoosier General Tire 500K (Atlanta)
- Last race: 2023 2023 General Tire 100 (Watkins Glen)
Wins	Top tens	Poles
0	6	0

ARCA Menards Series East career
- 4 races run over 1 year
- Best finish: 42nd (1992)
- First race: 1992 Big Apple Food Stores 200 (Oxford)
- Last race: 1992 Diet Coke 150 (Oxford)
Wins	Top tens	Poles
0	0	0

ARCA Menards Series West career
- 1 race run over 1 year
- Best finish: 71st (2001)
- First race: 2001 Pontiac Widetrack Grand Prix 200 (Fontana)
Wins	Top tens	Poles
0	0	0

IndyCar Series career
- 4 races run over 1 year
- Best finish: 29th (2009)
- First race: 2009 Honda Grand Prix of St. Petersburg (St. Petersburg)
- Last race: 2009 Indy Japan 300 (Motegi)
Wins	Podiums	Poles
0	0	0
- Statistics up to date as of November 18, 2024.

Stanton Thomas Barrett (born December 1, 1972) is an American professional stock car racing driver and Hollywood stuntman. He is the co-owner of Barrett–Cope Racing, which fields the No. 30 Chevrolet in the NASCAR O'Reilly Auto Parts Series. He has previously competed in the WRL and HSR/SVRA Vintage Series.

The son of former stuntman Stan Barrett, he began NASCAR racing in the early 1990s, starting with the Daytona Dash Series in 1991 and moving on to the Busch North and Busch Series in 1992. Seven years later, he started racing in the Cup Series, making his series debut with Donlavey Racing in 1999. Barrett has since run part-time across NASCAR's top three series, sometimes as an owner/driver. Barrett has also competed in the IndyCar Series, running four races in 2009 for Team 3G.

== Racing career ==
=== NASCAR ===
==== Early career ====
Barrett first started racing when he was sixteen in karts, winning 21 races in 28 starts. In 1992, Barrett started racing in NASCAR's Busch North Series, his debut coming at the Big Apple Food Stores 200 at Oxford Plains Speedway at the age of nineteen; Barrett finished 21st, eleven laps behind race winner Joe Bessey. He also ran in the NASCAR Goody's Dash Series, funding the car with money earned as a stuntman for the movie Freejack. Despite running as high as second in points while leading many races, crashes resulting in other hard racing drivers resulted in his final finish in the standings to sixth.

==== Xfinity Series ====
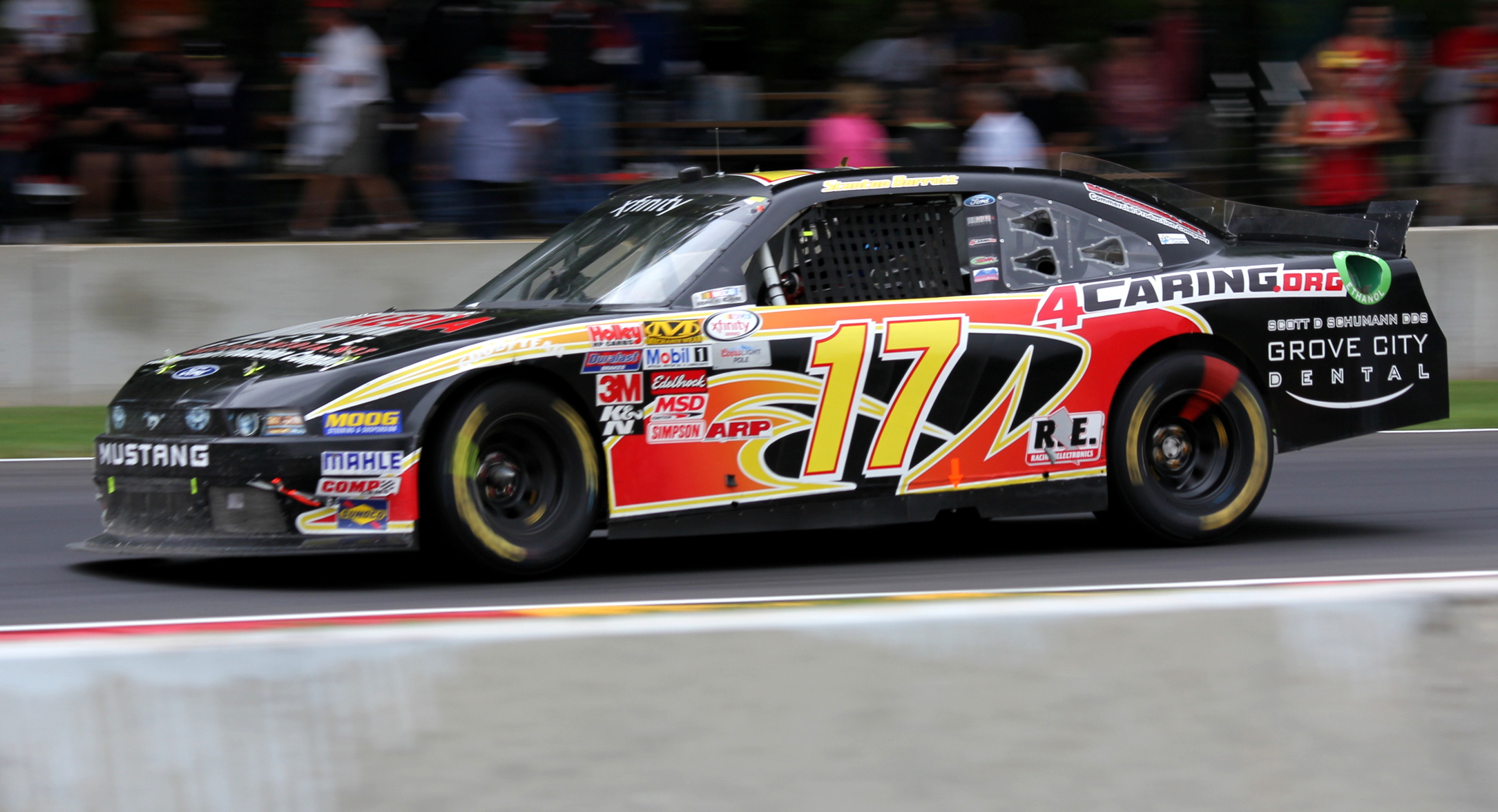
Barrett's No. 17 Ford Mustang at Road America in 2015

During the 1992 season, Busch Series driver Clifford Allison was killed in a crash at Michigan International Speedway, leaving a ride open for Barrett. He made a few limited starts with his own team in the series for several years, and in his sixth career start, finished fifth at the spring race at Atlanta in 1996.

For the following two years, Barrett drove for Pro-Tech Motorsports and NorthStar Motorsports, recording an eighth-place finish at Bristol with the latter. In 1999, Barrett ran a partial Busch slate with Galaxy Motorsports, but left the team in the middle of the season when management suggested he would be replaced for an upcoming race at Watkins Glen International. Later Galaxy Motorsports would fail to qualify for many races and go out of business.

In 2003, Barrett signed with Roush Racing and finished in the top-ten four times, but Odoban ended its sponsorship after fifteen races due to financial trouble, forcing the team to close down. He returned to driving his own car for the remainder of the season, on a partial bases. Barrett continued driving for his team in 2004, and joined DCT Motorsports for the 2005 season, scoring his only top ten of the season at New Hampshire Motor Speedway. In 2006, Barrett ran a variety of Busch events for MacDonald Motorsports and McGill Motorsports, and ran some races for Stanton Barrett Motorsports in 2007.

In 2008, Barrett became the primary driver for SKI Motorsports in the No. 30 and qualified for 26 of 29 attempted races for the team. Barrett had an average start of 29.3, an average finish of 25.7, five DNFs and two laps lead in his 2008 campaign, which included a start for his own team for race 32 at Memphis International Raceway. Barrett failed to qualify the No. 30 for SKI and had to race in his own No. 31 that was qualified by Kenny Hendrick to make the field, resulting in a DNF on lap 155 due to transmission issues. Barrett also failed to qualify at Homestead for race 35. Stanton finished the 2008 season 22nd in points and would only make 31 more NASCAR Nationwide Series starts from 2009-2023.

During the 2008 season, Barrett still ran his own No. 31 as an owner with 18 total starts for the car. Kenny Hendrick ran 14 of them, with Stanton, Jeff Fuller, and Shane Huffman each running one race in the No. 31. Stanton Barrett fielded a second car for his dad Stan at the 2008 NAPA Auto Parts 200 in the No. 61, he completed only seven laps before pulling off citing brake issues and finished in 39th.

The following year, Barrett joined Rick Ware Racing. He raced for them on a part-time schedule with some respectable finishes and top-ten qualifying and from 2009 to 2016 until he joined MBM Motorsports and B. J. McLeod Motorsports.

In 2019, Barrett returned to the Xfinity Series after a three year hiatus. He raced for MBM Motorsports in the Zippo 200 at Watkins Glen. He would finish 23rd.

In 2022, Barrett was driving the No. 47 for Mike Harmon Racing in 2022. However, he failed to qualify for the Sunoco Go Rewards 200 at Watkins Glen.

Barrett raced in the Xfinity Series in 2023, driving the No. 35 car for Emerling-Gase Motorsports in the race at Road America and the Shriners Children's 200 at Watkins Glen.

==== Cup Series ====
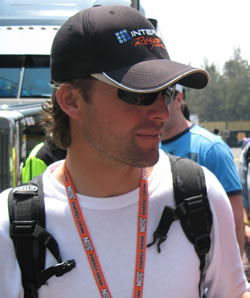
Barrett in Mexico City, 2008

In 1999, Barrett announced his intention to compete part-time in the Winston Cup Series, running for Rookie of the Year honors with PBH Motorsports, with plans to run full-time in 2000. During testing for General Motors at Daytona International Speedway, Barrett was the sixth-fastest driver with a speed of 185.624 miles per hour (298.733 km/h). However, he failed to qualify for the Daytona 500. Barrett worked out a late-season deal with Donlavey Racing to make eight race attempts in 1999. in 2000, he attempted the Budweiser Shootout qualifier for drivers who ran the fastest in second-round-qualifying in 1999, but crashed on the first lap when Jimmy Spencer collected Rick Mast and Kenny Wallace. He joined the Tri-Star Motorsports team for the 2000 Daytona 500.

In 2004, Barrett returned to Nextel Cup driving the No. 94 Chevrolet for W.W. Motorsports where Barrett helped the team prepare and field the car from Stanton Barrett Motorsports shop. He failed to finish a race for the team and parted ways when driving duties were taken by Derrike Cope. Later in the year, he helped Means-Jenkins Motorsports to drive the No. 92 for the race at Dover, but failed to qualify.

In 2005, Barrett began the season helping Front Row Motorsports start out of Stanton Barrett Motorsports shop but later owner of Front Row Motorsports and Stanton Barrett decided to take different paths; he then ran Cup races under his own Stanton Barrett Motorsports team. The following year, he ran a partial schedule between SBM and Rick Ware Racing, failing to qualify for a number of races. He reunited with Ware for an attempt at the 2007 Daytona 500. Barrett attempted a limited schedule of 2008 races with in a partnership with Stanton Barrett Motorsports/SKI Motorsports.

Barrett was initially scheduled to make his Cup Series return in 2017 with Rick Ware Racing, but did not make a start. A year later, he rejoined Ware for the 2018 Bank of America Roval 400 at Charlotte. In 2019, he returned to the series for his first superspeedway Cup start in the 2019 GEICO 500 at Talladega.

In August 2020, Barrett joined Spire Motorsports for the Go Bowling 235 on the Daytona road course.

==== Truck Series ====
In 2015, Barrett made his Camping World Truck Series debut for his team at Talladega Superspeedway, driving the No. 91 Chevrolet Silverado. The race marked his first at Talladega since 2005. After qualifying 21st, Barrett was collected in The Big One on lap 86, hitting the wall and Matt Crafton. Barrett was credited with a 29th-place finish.

=== IndyCar Series ===
In 2009, Barrett expressed an interest in running IndyCar Series races after the series merged with Champ Car. At the Nationwide Series race at Kansas Speedway, he officially announced that he had joined Team 3G full-time to drive the No. 98, while also running 19–21 races in the Nationwide Series. In his IndyCar debut at the Honda Grand Prix of St. Petersburg, Barrett qualified 21st and finished twelfth, four laps behind race winner Ryan Briscoe. Barrett struggled during the season, including failing to qualify for the Indianapolis 500 and missing the ABC Supply Company A.J. Foyt 225 due to a crash in practice, and eventually sponsorship difficulties resulted in him getting replaced by Jaques Lazier. Barrett returned to the series later in the year at the Indy Japan 300, where he finished 19th after a broken hub caused the loss of several laps in the race. His result in St. Petersburg remained the team's best finish that season.

=== Other racing ===
In 1996, Barrett made an IMSA GT Championship start at Road Atlanta in the Grand Prix of Atlanta, driving a Chevrolet Camaro for Shaver Motorsports with Jack Willes as a co-driver. After qualifying fourteenth, the team finished thirteenth overall and fifth in the GTS-1 class. Barrett finished fourth at Road Atlanta. He returned to sports car racing in 2017, competing in the Trans-Am Series's TA class in the No. 33 Chevrolet qualifying with the track record and pole position in Homestead.

In 2006, Barrett and nine other NASCAR drivers competed in the Geoff Bodine Bobsled Challenge, a charity race for the Bo-Dyn Bobsled Project; Barrett finished third overall, the only driver to finish in the top-three in the event's two races. Later Barrett went on to help USA athletes with resources, funding and Bobsleds, while at the same time competing in some North America Cup races and the US National Championships with best result of sixth in the two man Bobsled Americas Cup race in Calgary, Canada.

In July 2021, Barrett tested with the Stadium Super Trucks ahead of his series debut the following month at the Music City Grand Prix.

== Film career ==
Barrett has performed as a stuntman in skiing, motocross and snowmobile racing. He has worked in over 300 motion pictures and television series and commercials. He has worked additionally in stunt doubling, stunt coordinating, 2nd Unit Director for many Hollywood actors in films such as The Dukes of Hazzard, Spider-Man 1, 2 and 3, Jurassic Park 2 and 3, Rat Race, Blade, Batman, The Nutty Professor, Volcano, Jumanji, Fastlane, Mr. & Mrs. Smith, Meeting Evil and 127 Hours.

In 2015, Barrett directed his first movie, a direct-to-video film titled Navy Seals vs. Zombies. Navy Seals vs. Zombies was a Starz #1 movie for several weeks in 2024 and remained in Starz Top Ten movies for several months.

Barrett has received numerous achievement awards winning Red Bull Taurus Stunt Award for best motion picture water work in the movie The Lost World: Jurassic Park, where Barrett stunt doubled for William H. Macy.

== Personal life ==
His father, Stan Barrett who was also a Hollywood stuntman, raced in 19 Winston Cup Series races between 1980 and 1990, posting two top-ten finishes, along with running in the Nationwide Series in 2008. He is the godson of Paul Newman, and the grandson of Dave and Roma McCoy, the founders of Mammoth Mountain Ski Area.

In 2008, Barrett and his father had the opportunity competed against each other in the Nationwide Series road course races at Circuit Gilles Villeneuve and Watkins Glen with Stanton driving the No. 30 car for his own team and Stan driving the No. 61 car for Specialty Racing. The younger Barrett thought it would be a great experience to have the opportunity to race with his father and fielded a car for his legendary father Stan Barrett under the Stanton Barrett Motorsports banner.

His mother is Penny McCoy, a former World Cup alpine ski racer. At the age of sixteen, she won the bronze medal in the women's slalom at the 1966 World Championships in Portillo, Chile. His brother David Barrett is a television director, producer and himself a former stuntman.

He currently owns and operates Stanton Barrett Family Wines, which sponsored him in the Xfinity Series race at Road America in 2023. Stanton Barrett Family Wines is a California based wine company making award winning 100% Variety fine wine.

== Motorsports career results ==
=== NASCAR ===
(key) (Bold – Pole position awarded by qualifying time. Italics – Pole position earned by points standings or practice time. * – Most laps led.)

==== Cup Series ====
NASCAR Cup Series results
Year	Team	No.	Make	1	2	3	4	5	6	7	8	9	10	11	12	13	14	15	16	17	18	19	20	21	22	23	24	25	26	27	28	29	30	31	32	33	34	35	36	NCSC	Pts	Ref
1999	PBH Motorsports	84	Chevy	DAY; DNQ	CAR																																			56th	143	
1999	Donlavey Racing	90	Ford			LVS; 30	ATL	DAR	TEX; DNQ	BRI; DNQ	MAR	TAL	CAL	RCH	CLT	DOV	MCH	POC	SON	DAY; DNQ	NHA	POC; 31	IND; DNQ	GLN	MCH; DNQ	BRI	DAR; DNQ	RCH; DNQ	NHA	DOV	MAR	CLT	TAL	CAR	PHO	HOM	ATL			56th	143	
2000	TriStar Motorsports	48	Ford	DAY; DNQ	CAR	LVS	ATL	DAR	BRI	TEX	MAR	TAL	CAL	RCH	CLT	DOV	MCH	POC	SON	DAY	NHA	POC	IND	GLN	MCH	BRI	DAR	RCH	NHA	DOV	MAR	CLT	TAL	CAR	PHO	HOM	ATL			NA	-	
2004	W.W. Motorsports	94	Chevy	DAY	CAR	LVS	ATL	DAR; DNQ	BRI; 32	TEX	MAR; 41	TAL	CAL; 40	RCH; DNQ	CLT; DNQ	DOV; 43	POC; DNQ	MCH	SON	DAY	CHI	NHA	POC	IND																62nd	224	
2004	Ware Racing Enterprises	52	Dodge																						GLN; DNQ		BRI; DNQ	CAL	RCH	NHA										62nd	224	
2004	R&J Racing	37	Dodge																							MCH; DNQ														62nd	224	
2004	Front Row Motorsports	92	Ford																												DOV; DNQ	TAL								62nd	224	
2004	W.W. Motorsports	94	Ford																														KAN; 41	CLT	MAR	ATL	PHO; DNQ	DAR	HOM	62nd	224	
2005	Front Row Motorsports	92	Chevy	DAY; DNQ	CAL; DNQ	LVS; DNQ	ATL; DNQ	BRI; 41	MAR; DNQ	TEX; DNQ	PHO; 30	TAL; DNQ	DAR; 31	RCH	CLT	DOV; 34	POC	MCH	SON; DNQ	DAY	CHI	NHA	POC	IND	GLN	MCH														51st	389	
2005	Stanton Barrett Motorsports	95	Chevy																								BRI; 41	CAL	RCH; DNQ	NHA; DNQ	DOV; 43	TAL	KAN	CLT; DNQ	MAR; 43	ATL	TEX	PHO; 42	HOM	51st	389	
2006	Stanton Barrett Motorsports	95	Chevy	DAY; DNQ	CAL; 40	LVS; DNQ	ATL; DNQ	BRI; 39	MAR; 39	TEX; DNQ	PHO; 33	TAL; DNQ	RCH; DNQ	DAR; 40	CLT; DNQ	DOV; DNQ	POC; DNQ	MCH	SON; DNQ	DAY	CHI	NHA; 40																		51st	343	
2006	Rick Ware Racing	52	Dodge																				POC; DNQ	IND	GLN	MCH														51st	343	
2006	Rick Ware Racing	30	Dodge																								BRI; DNQ	CAL	RCH											51st	343	
2006	Rick Ware Racing	30	Chevy																											NHA; DNQ					MAR; DNQ	ATL	TEX	PHO	HOM	51st	343	
2006	Front Row Motorsports	61	Dodge																												DOV; 35	KAN	TAL	CLT						51st	343	
2007	Rick Ware Racing	30	Chevy	DAY; DNQ	CAL	LVS	ATL	BRI	MAR	TEX	PHO	TAL	RCH	DAR	CLT	DOV	POC	MCH	SON	NHA	DAY	CHI	IND	POC	GLN	MCH														NA	-	
2007	Front Row Motorsports	34	Dodge																								BRI; DNQ	CAL	RCH	NHA	DOV	KAN	TAL	CLT	MAR	ATL	TEX	PHO	HOM	NA	-	
2008	SKI Motorsports	50	Chevy	DAY; DNQ	CAL	LVS	ATL	BRI	MAR	TEX	PHO	TAL	RCH	DAR	CLT; DNQ	DOV	POC	MCH	SON	NHA	DAY	CHI	IND; DNQ	POC	GLN	MCH	BRI	CAL	RCH	NHA	DOV; DNQ	KAN	TAL	CLT	MAR	ATL	TEX	PHO	HOM	NA	-	
2018	Rick Ware Racing	51	Ford	DAY	ATL	LVS	PHO	CAL	MAR	TEX	BRI	RCH	TAL	DOV	KAN	CLT	POC	MCH	SON	CHI	DAY	KEN	NHA	POC	GLN	MCH	BRI	DAR	IND	LVS	RCH	ROV; 40	DOV	TAL	KAN	MAR	TEX	PHO	HOM	49th	1	
2019	Rick Ware Racing	52	Chevy	DAY	ATL	LVS	PHO	CAL	MAR	TEX	BRI	RCH	TAL; 35	DOV	KAN	CLT	POC	MCH	SON	CHI	DAY	KEN	NHA	POC	GLN	MCH	BRI	DAR	IND	LVS	RCH	ROV	DOV	TAL	KAN	MAR	TEX	PHO	HOM	39th	2	
2020	Spire Motorsports	77	Chevy	DAY	LVS	CAL	PHO	DAR	DAR	CLT	CLT	BRI	ATL	MAR	HOM	TAL	POC	POC	IND	KEN	TEX	KAN	NHA	MCH	MCH	DRC; 38	DOV	DOV	DAY	DAR	RCH	BRI	LVS	TAL	ROV	KAN	TEX	MAR	PHO	38th	1	

===== Daytona 500 =====
Year	Team	Manufacturer	Start	Finish
1999	PBH Motorsports	Chevrolet	DNQ	
2000	TriStar Motorsports	Ford	DNQ	
2005	Front Row Motorsports	Chevrolet	DNQ	
2006	Stanton Barrett Motorsports	Chevrolet	DNQ	
2007	Rick Ware Racing	Chevrolet	DNQ	
2008	SKI Motorsports	Chevrolet	DNQ	

==== Xfinity Series ====
NASCAR Xfinity Series results
Year	Team	No.	Make	1	2	3	4	5	6	7	8	9	10	11	12	13	14	15	16	17	18	19	20	21	22	23	24	25	26	27	28	29	30	31	32	33	34	35	NXSC	Pts	Ref
1992	Owen Racing	9	Buick	DAY	CAR	RCH	ATL	MAR	DAR	BRI	HCY	LAN	DUB	NZH	CLT	DOV	ROU	MYB	GLN	VOL	NHA	TAL	IRP	ROU	MCH	NHA	BRI; 26	DAR	RCH	DOV	CLT	MAR	CAR	HCY					155th	83	
1993	Stan Barrett	91	Olds	DAY	CAR	RCH	DAR	BRI	HCY	ROU	MAR	NZH	CLT	DOV	MYB	GLN	MLW	TAL	IRP	MCH	NHA	BRI	DAR	RCH	DOV	ROU	CLT; DNQ	MAR	CAR; 35	HCY	ATL								105th	58	
1994	Stan Barrett	91	Chevy	DAY	CAR	RCH	ATL	MAR	DAR	HCY	BRI	ROU	NHA	NZH	CLT; 20	DOV	MYB	GLN	MLW	SBO	TAL	HCY	IRP	MCH	BRI	DAR	RCH	DOV	CLT; 36	MAR	CAR; 41								72nd	198	
1995	Stan Barrett	91	Chevy	DAY	CAR; 35	RCH	ATL	NSV	DAR	BRI	HCY	NHA	NZH	CLT; DNQ	DOV	MYB	GLN	MLW	TAL	SBO	IRP	MCH	BRI	DAR	RCH	DOV	CLT	CAR	HOM										104th	58	
1996	Shaver Motorsports	49	Chevy	DAY	CAR	RCH	ATL; 5	NSV	DAR; 32	BRI	HCY	NZH	CLT; DNQ	DOV	SBO	MYB	GLN	MLW	NHA	TAL	IRP	MCH	BRI	DAR	RCH	DOV	CLT	CAR	HOM										64th	222	
1997	Pro Tech Motorsports	81	Chevy	DAY; 43	CAR; 25	RCH; 28	ATL; 39	LVS	DAR; DNQ	HCY	TEX	BRI	NSV	TAL	NHA	NZH	CLT	DOV	SBO	GLN	MLW	MYB	GTY	IRP	MCH	BRI	DAR	RCH	DOV	CLT									59th	438	
1997	NorthStar Motorsports	89	Ford																												CAL; 14	CAR; 31	HOM						59th	438	
1998	NorthStar Motorsports	89	Ford	DAY; 15	CAR; DNQ	LVS; 15	NSV; 30	DAR; 31	BRI; 8	TEX; 23	HCY	TAL; 40																											49th	865	
1998	Washington-Erving Motorsports	50	Ford										NHA; 34	NZH	CLT	DOV	RCH																	HOM; 29					49th	865	
1998	Specialty Racing	40	Chevy															PPR; 31	GLN	MLW	MYB	CAL	SBO	IRP	MCH	BRI	DAR	RCH	DOV	CLT	GTY	CAR	ATL						49th	865	
1999	Galaxy Motorsports	40	Chevy	DAY	CAR	LVS	ATL	DAR	TEX; DNQ	NSV; 19	BRI; 16	TAL; 15	CAL; 20	NHA; 30	RCH; 37	NZH; 24	CLT; 20	DOV; 23	SBO; DNQ	GLN	MLW	MYB	PPR	GTY	IRP	MCH	BRI	DAR	RCH	DOV	CLT	CAR							48th	1074	
1999	Xpress Motorsports	61	Pontiac																														MEM; 24	PHO; 23	HOM; 43				48th	1074	
2000	Washington-Erving Motorsports	50	Chevy	DAY	CAR	LVS	ATL	DAR	BRI	TEX	NSV	TAL	CAL	RCH	NHA	CLT; DNQ	DOV	SBO	MYB	GLN	MLW	NZH	PPR	GTY	IRP	MCH	BRI												NA	-	
2000		12																										DAR; DNQ	RCH	DOV	CLT	CAR	MEM	PHO	HOM				NA	-	
2001	Matrix Motorsports	79	Ford	DAY	CAR	LVS	ATL	DAR	BRI	TEX	NSH	TAL	CAL; 39	RCH	NHA	NZH	CLT	DOV	KEN	MLW	GLN	CHI	GTY	PPR	IRP	MCH	BRI												74th	277	
2001	Red Racing	91	Chevy																									DAR; 20	RCH	DOV; 27	KAN; 28	CLT; 39	MEM; 38	PHO	CAR	HOM			74th	277	
2002	Stanton Barrett Motorsports	91	Chevy	DAY	CAR	LVS	DAR	BRI	TEX	NSH	TAL	CAL	RCH	NHA	NZH	CLT; DNQ	DOV	NSH; 21	KEN; 43	MLW	DAY		GTY; 28	PPR; 27	IRP			DAR; 24	RCH					ATL; 34					46th	908	
2002	Stanton Barrett Motorsports	91	Ford																			CHI; 20				MCH; 33	BRI			DOV; 23	KAN	CLT; 21	MEM; 22		CAR; 42	PHO	HOM; DNQ		46th	908	
2003	Roush Racing	60	Ford	DAY; 41	CAR; 19	LVS; 8	DAR; 15	BRI; 16	TEX; 19	TAL; 40	NSH; 6	CAL; 34	RCH; 41	GTY; 9	NZH; 20	CLT; 22	DOV; 12	NSH; 7	KEN	MLW	DAY																		25th	1863	
2003	Stanton Barrett Motorsports	91	Pontiac																			CHI; 34	NHA	PPR; 42	IRP	MCH						CLT; 30				CAR; 40	HOM		25th	1863	
2003	Stanton Barrett Motorsports	91	Chevy																								BRI; QL^{†}	DAR	RCH; 38	DOV	KAN; DNQ		MEM; 42	ATL	PHO; 41				25th	1863	
2004	Stanton Barrett Motorsports	91	Pontiac	DAY; DNQ	CAR; QL^{‡}	LVS	DAR	BRI; 42	TEX; 38	NSH; 41	TAL		GTY; 42	RCH	NZH	CLT	DOV	NSH		MLW; 18	DAY		NHA; 33						RCH; 18				MEM; 42						36th	1330	
2004	Stanton Barrett Motorsports	91	Dodge									CAL; DNQ																											36th	1330	
2004	Stanton Barrett Motorsports	97	Chevy																KEN; 37																				36th	1330	
2004	Stanton Barrett Motorsports	91	Chevy																			CHI; DNQ		PPR; 38	IRP	MCH; 20	BRI; 22			DOV; 37	KAN; 26	CLT; 32							36th	1330	
2004	Ware Racing Enterprises	51	Dodge																									CAL; 38											36th	1330	
2004	DCT Motorsports	36	Chevy																															ATL; 24	PHO	DAR; 18	HOM; 23		36th	1330	
2005	DCT Motorsports	36	Chevy	DAY; 29	CAL; 33	MXC; 19	LVS; 26	ATL; 26	NSH; 39	BRI; 37	TEX; 24		TAL; 23	DAR; 16		CLT; 21	DOV; 22	NSH; 26	KEN; 17		DAY; 35	CHI; 26		PPR; 19	GTY; 39		GLN; 38	MCH; 38											22nd	2252	
2005	DCT Motorsports	36	Pontiac									PHO; 12			RCH; 19					MLW; 21			NHA; 10			IRP; 36			BRI; 42										22nd	2252	
2005	Fitz Motorsports	40	Dodge																											CAL; 41	RCH; 42	DOV	KAN	CLT	MEM	TEX	PHO	HOM	22nd	2252	
2006	MacDonald Motorsports	72	Chevy	DAY	CAL	MXC	LVS	ATL	BRI	TEX	NSH; 21	PHO	TAL	RCH; 42	DAR	CLT; DNQ	DOV; 23	NSH	KEN	MLW	DAY	CHI	NHA; 41	MAR	GTY; 42	IRP	GLN	MCH	BRI		RCH; 28	DOV; 32	KAN	CLT					61st	606	
2006	McGill Motorsports	36	Chevy																											CAL; 32									61st	606	
2006	Stanton Barrett Motorsports	95	Chevy																																MEM; DNQ	TEX	PHO; 26	HOM	61st	606	
2007	Stanton Barrett Motorsports	30	Chevy	DAY	CAL	MXC; 40	LVS	ATL	BRI; 17	NSH	TEX; 33	PHO	TAL	RCH	DAR; 42	CLT; 29	DOV	NSH; 38	KEN	MLW	NHA; 27	DAY	CHI; 31	GTY; 20	IRP	CGV; 17	GLN	MCH	BRI	CAL; 19	RCH	DOV; 17	KAN	CLT; 24	MEM; 19	TEX; 38	PHO; 30	HOM	42nd	1285	
2008	SKI Motorsports	30	Chevy	DAY; 38	CAL	LVS; 11	ATL	BRI; 25	NSH	TEX; 27	PHO	MXC; 30	TAL	RCH	DAR; 19	CLT; 35	DOV; 21	NSH; 17	KEN; 25	MLW; 17	NHA; 33	DAY; 26	CHI; 35	GTY; 24	IRP	CGV; 25	GLN; 26	MCH; 21	BRI; 20	CAL; 21	RCH; 25	DOV; 27	KAN; 34	CLT; 28	MEM; DNQ	TEX; 24	PHO; 26	HOM; DNQ	22nd	2329	
2008	Stanton Barrett Motorsports	31	Chevy																																MEM; 34				22nd	2329	
2009	Rick Ware Racing	31	Chevy	DAY; DNQ	CAL; 28	LVS; 28	BRI; DNQ	TEX	NSH	PHO	TAL	RCH	DAR	CLT; 25	DOV	NSH			NHA	DAY	CHI; DNQ	GTY; DNQ	IRP	IOW	GLN	MCH	BRI		ATL	RCH	DOV	KAN	CAL; DNQ	CLT	MEM	TEX	PHO	HOM	82nd	337	
2009	Rick Ware Racing	79	Chevy														KEN; 43																						82nd	337	
2009	Rick Ware Racing	41	Chevy															MLW; DNQ										CGV; 24											82nd	337	
2010	Rick Ware Racing	31	Chevy	DAY; 37	CAL	LVS; 24	BRI	NSH	PHO	TEX	TAL	RCH						ROA; 17	NHA	DAY	CHI	GTY	IRP	IOW	GLN	MCH	BRI									TEX; 33	PHO	HOM	72nd	445	
2010	Rick Ware Racing	41	Chevy										DAR; 14	DOV	CLT	NSH	KEN											CGV; DNQ	ATL	RCH	DOV	KAN	CAL	CLT	GTY				72nd	445	
2011	Rick Ware Racing	41	Chevy	DAY	PHO	LVS	BRI	CAL	TEX	TAL	NSH	RCH	DAR	DOV	IOW	CLT	CHI	MCH	ROA	DAY	KEN	NHA	NSH	IRP	IOW	GLN	CGV	BRI	ATL	RCH	CHI	DOV	KAN	CLT	TEX	PHO	HOM; 31		79th	13	
2012	Rick Ware Racing	15	Ford	DAY	PHO	LVS	BRI	CAL	TEX	RCH	TAL	DAR	IOW	CLT	DOV	MCH	ROA	KEN	DAY	NHA	CHI	IND	IOW	GLN	CGV	BRI	ATL	RCH	CHI	KEN	DOV	CLT; 29	KAN	TEX	PHO	HOM			89th	15	
2013	Rick Ware Racing	15	Ford	DAY	PHO	LVS	BRI	CAL	TEX	RCH; DNQ	TAL; DNQ	DAR	CLT	DOV	IOW	MCH									MOH; 35	BRI	ATL	RCH	CHI	KEN	DOV	KAN	CLT	TEX	PHO	HOM			59th	51	
2013	Rick Ware Racing	23	Ford														ROA; 19	KEN	DAY																				59th	51	
2013	Rick Ware Racing	23	Chevy																	NHA; 27	CHI	IND	IOW	GLN															59th	51	
2014	Rick Ware Racing	87	Ford	DAY	PHO	LVS	BRI	CAL	TEX	DAR	RCH	TAL	IOW	CLT	DOV	MCH	ROA; 32	KEN	DAY	NHA	CHI	IND	IOW	GLN; 18	MOH; 33	BRI	ATL	RCH	CHI	KEN	DOV	KAN	CLT	TEX	PHO	HOM			51st	49	
2015	Rick Ware Racing	15	Chevy	DAY	ATL	LVS	PHO	CAL; 32																															47th	67	
2015	Rick Ware Racing	15	Ford						TEX; 37	BRI	RCH	TAL	IOW	CLT	DOV	MCH	CHI	DAY	KEN	NHA	IND; 28	IOW	GLN	MOH	BRI						DOV; 30	CLT	KAN	TEX	PHO	HOM			47th	67	
2015	Rick Ware Racing	17	Ford																							ROA; 26	DAR	RCH	CHI	KEN									47th	67	
2016	Rick Ware Racing	15	Dodge	DAY; DNQ	ATL																																		40th	78	
2016	Rick Ware Racing	15	Ford			LVS; 30	PHO	CAL	TEX	BRI	RCH	TAL	DOV	CLT	POC	MCH	IOW	DAY	KEN	NHA																			40th	78	
2016	Rick Ware Racing	25	Chevy																		IND; 31	IOW																	40th	78	
2016	MBM Motorsports	13	Dodge																				GLN; 19																40th	78	
2016	B. J. McLeod Motorsports	15	Ford																					MOH; 20	BRI														40th	78	
2016	B. J. McLeod Motorsports	99	Ford																							ROA; 27	DAR	RCH	CHI	KEN	DOV	CLT	KAN	TEX	PHO	HOM			40th	78	
2019	MBM Motorsports	42	Toyota	DAY	ATL	LVS	PHO	CAL	TEX	BRI	RCH	TAL	DOV	CLT	POC	MCH	IOW	CHI	DAY	KEN	NHA	IOW	GLN; 23	MOH	BRI	ROA	DAR	IND	LVS	RCH	CLT	DOV	KAN	TEX	PHO	HOM			97th	0^{1}	
2022	Mike Harmon Racing	47	Chevy	DAY	CAL	LVS	PHO	ATL	COA	RCH	MAR	TAL	DOV	DAR	TEX	CLT	PIR	NSH	ROA	ATL	NHA	POC	IND	MCH	GLN; DNQ	DAY	DAR	KAN	BRI	TEX	TAL	CLT	LVS	HOM	MAR	PHO			N/A	0	
2023	Emerling-Gase Motorsports	35	Toyota	DAY	CAL	LVS	PHO	ATL	COA	RCH	MAR	TAL	DOV	DAR	CLT	POR	SON	NSH	CSC	ATL	NHA	POC	ROA; 24	MCH	IND	GLN; 32	DAY	DAR	KAN	BRI	TEX	CLT	LVS	HOM	MAR	PHO			58th	18	
2024	Mike Harmon Racing	74	Chevy	DAY; DNQ	ATL	LVS	PHO	COA	RCH	MAR	TEX	TAL	DOV	DAR	CLT	PIR	SON	IOW	NHA	NSH	CSC	POC	IND	MCH	DAY	DAR	ATL	GLN	BRI	KAN	TAL	ROV	LVS	HOM	MAR	PHO			N/A	0	
^{†} - Qualified for Jimmy Kitchens ·^{‡} - Qualified for Kenny Wallace

==== Camping World Truck Series ====
NASCAR Camping World Truck Series results
Year	Team	No.	Make	1	2	3	4	5	6	7	8	9	10	11	12	13	14	15	16	17	18	19	20	21	22	23	NCWTC	Pts	Ref
2015	Stanton Barrett Motorsports	91	Chevy	DAY	ATL	MAR	KAN	CLT	DOV	TEX	GTW	IOW	KEN	ELD	POC	MCH	BRI	MSP	CHI	NHA	LVS	TAL; 29	MAR	TEX	PHO	HOM	104th	0^{1}	

^{*} Season still in progress
^{1} Ineligible for series points

=== ARCA Menards Series ===
(key) (Bold – Pole position awarded by qualifying time. Italics – Pole position earned by points standings or practice time. * – Most laps led.)

ARCA Re/Max Series results
Year	Team	No.	Make	1	2	3	4	5	6	7	8	9	10	11	12	13	14	15	16	17	18	19	20	21	22	23	24	25	AMSC	Pts	Ref
1995	Info not available	19	Chevy	DAY	ATL	TAL	FIF	KIL	FRS	MCH	I80	MCS	FRS	POC	POC	KIL	FRS	SBS	LVL	ISF	DSF	SLM	WIN	ATL; 31					103rd	0	
2001	Randy Fenley	15	Ford	DAY	NSH	WIN	SLM	GTY	KEN; 8																				55th	635	
2001	Mark Thompson	66	Ford							CLT; 4	KAN	MCH	POC	MEM; 4	GLN	KEN	MCH	POC	NSH	ISF	CHI	DSF	SLM	TOL	BLN	CLT	TAL	ATL	55th	635	
2021	Fast Track Racing	12	Toyota	DAY	PHO	TAL	KAN	TOL	CLT	MOH; 6	POC	ELK	BLN	IOW	WIN	GLN	MCH	ISF	MLW	DSF	BRI	SLM	KAN						78th	38	
2022	Fast Track Racing	11	Toyota	DAY	PHO	TAL	KAN	CLT	IOW	BLN	ELK	MOH; 7	POC	IRP	MCH	GLN; 12	ISF	MLW	DSF	KAN	BRI	SLM	TOL						51st	69	
2023	Fast Track Racing	12	Toyota	DAY	PHO	TAL	KAN	CLT	BLN	ELK	MOH	IOW	POC	MCH	IRP	GLN; 9	ISF	MLW	DSF	KAN	BRI	SLM	TOL						83rd	35	

=== American open-wheel racing ===
(key) (Races in bold indicate pole position)

==== IndyCar Series ====
Year	Team	No.	Chassis	Engine	1	2	3	4	5	6	7	8	9	10	11	12	13	14	15	16	17	Rank	Points	Ref
2009	Team 3G	98	Dallara IR-05	Honda HI7R V8	STP; 12	LBH; 17	KAN; 17	INDY; DNQ	MIL; DNS	TXS	IOW	RIR	WGL	TOR	EDM	KTY	MOH	SNM	CHI	MOT; 19	HMS	29th	62	

Years	Teams	Races	Poles	Wins	Podiums (non-win)	Top 10s (non-podium)	Indianapolis 500 wins	Championships
1	1	4	0	0	0	0	0	0

=== Stadium Super Trucks ===
(key) (Bold – Pole position. Italics – Fastest qualifier. * – Most laps led.)

Stadium Super Trucks results
Year	1	2	3	4	5	6	7	8	9	10	SSTC	Pts	Ref
2021	STP	STP	MOH	MOH	MOH	MOH	**NSH**; 8	NSH; 11	LBH	LBH	17th	23	
2022	LBH	LBH	MOH	MOH	NSH; 7	NSH; 4	BRI	BRI			11th	32	
