= 2019 Zippo 200 at The Glen =

Race details
- Race 20 of 33 in the 2019 NASCAR Xfinity Series season
- Date: August 3, 2019
- Location: Watkins Glen International in Watkins Glen, New York
- Course: Permanent racing facility
- Course length: 2.45 miles (3.94 km)
- Distance: 82 laps, 200.9 mi (323.3 km)

Pole position
Driver	Kyle Busch	Joe Gibbs Racing
- Time: 71.098

Most laps led
Driver	A. J. Allmendinger	Kaulig Racing
- Laps: 24

Winner
No. 22	Austin Cindric	Team Penske

Television in the United States
- Network: NBC

Radio in the United States
- Radio: MRN

The 2019 Zippo 200 at The Glen is a NASCAR Xfinity Series race held on August 3, 2019, at Watkins Glen International in Watkins Glen, New York. Contested over 82 laps on the 2.45-mile (3.94 km) road course, it was the 20th race of the 2019 NASCAR Xfinity Series season. Austin Cindric won his first career Xfinity Series race after catching, passing, and holding off experienced Watkins Glen cup winner A. J. Allmendinger, who would later be disqualified from the event.

== Background ==
=== Track ===
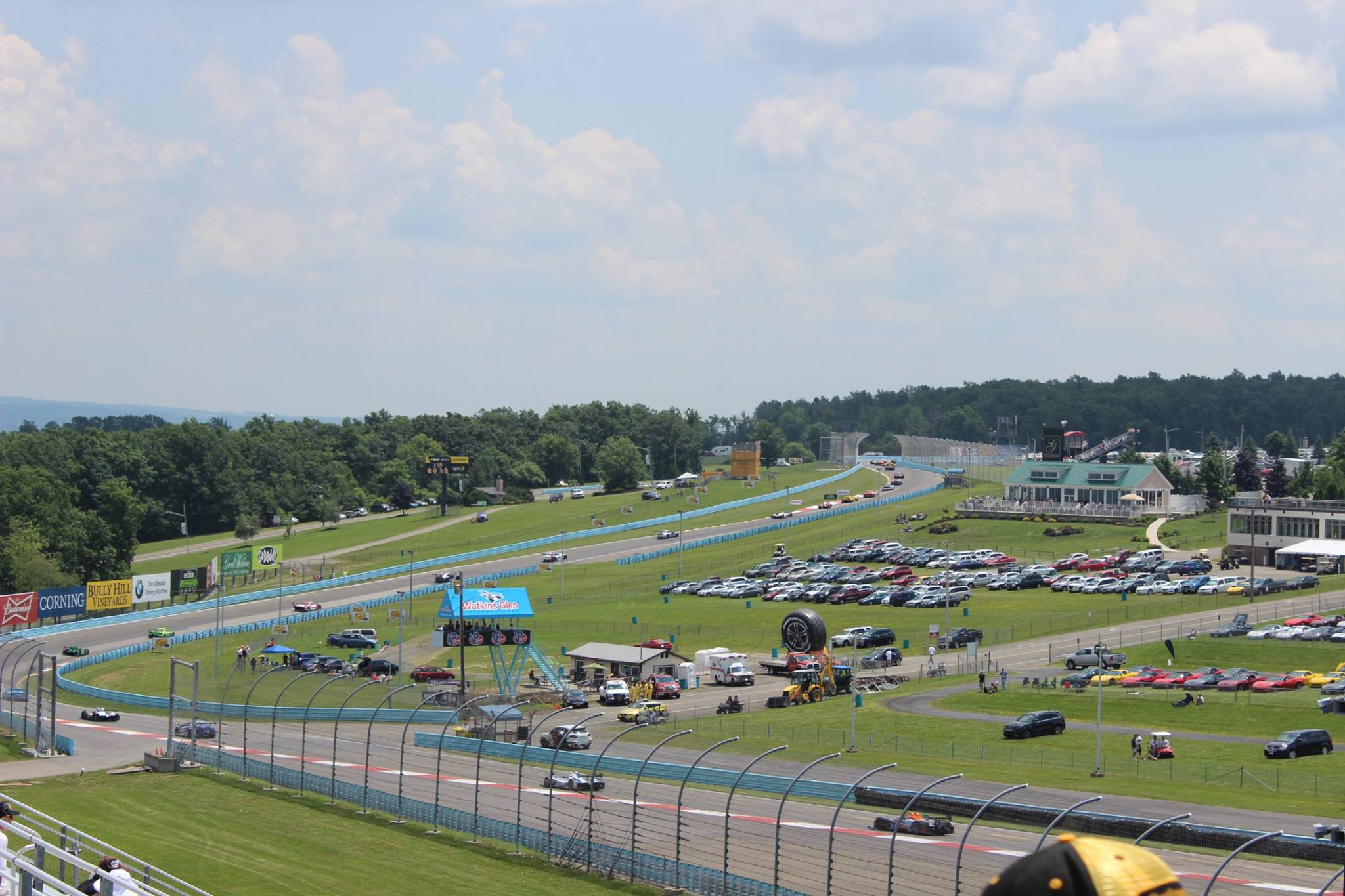
Watkins Glen International in 2014, the track where the race was held.

Watkins Glen International (nicknamed "The Glen") is an automobile race track located in Watkins Glen, New York at the southern tip of Seneca Lake. It was long known around the world as the home of the Formula One United States Grand Prix, which it hosted for twenty consecutive years (1961–1980), but the site has been home to road racing of nearly every class, including the World Sportscar Championship, Trans-Am, Can-Am, NASCAR Sprint Cup Series, the International Motor Sports Association and the IndyCar Series.

== Entry list ==
No.	Driver	Team	Manufacturer
00	Cole Custer	Stewart-Haas Racing with Biagi-DenBeste Racing	Ford
0	Garrett Smithley	JD Motorsports	Chevrolet
01	Stephen Leicht	JD Motorsports	Chevrolet
1	Michael Annett	JR Motorsports	Chevrolet
2	Tyler Reddick	Richard Childress Racing	Chevrolet
4	Ross Chastain (i)	JD Motorsports	Chevrolet
5	Scott Heckert	B. J. McLeod Motorsports	Toyota
07	Ray Black Jr.	SS-Green Light Racing	Chevrolet
7	Justin Allgaier	JR Motorsports	Chevrolet
08	Gray Gaulding (R)	SS-Green Light Racing	Chevrolet
8	Ryan Preece (i)	JR Motorsports	Chevrolet
9	Noah Gragson (R)	JR Motorsports	Chevrolet
10	A. J. Allmendinger	Kaulig Racing	Chevrolet
11	Justin Haley (R)	Kaulig Racing	Chevrolet
12	Ryan Blaney (i)	Team Penske	Ford
13	Chad Finchum	MBM Motorsports	Toyota
15	B. J. McLeod	JD Motorsports	Chevrolet
18	Kyle Busch (i)	Joe Gibbs Racing	Toyota
19	Brandon Jones	Joe Gibbs Racing	Toyota
20	Christopher Bell	Joe Gibbs Racing	Toyota
22	Austin Cindric	Team Penske	Ford
23	John Hunter Nemechek (R)	GMS Racing	Chevrolet
35	Joey Gase	MBM Motorsports	Toyota
36	Josh Williams	DGM Racing	Chevrolet
38	J. J. Yeley (i)	RSS Racing	Chevrolet
39	Ryan Sieg	RSS Racing	Chevrolet
42	Stanton Barrett (i)	MBM Motorsports	Toyota
51	Jeremy Clements	Jeremy Clements Racing	Chevrolet
52	David Starr	Jimmy Means Racing	Chevrolet
66	Tommy Joe Martins	MBM Motorsports	Toyota
74	Dan Corcoran (i)	Mike Harmon Racing	Chevrolet
78	Vinnie Miller	B. J. McLeod Motorsports	Chevrolet
86	Brandon Brown	Brandonbilt Motorsports	Chevrolet
90	Alex Labbé	DGM Racing	Chevrolet
93	Josh Bilicki	RSS Racing	Chevrolet
98	Chase Briscoe (R)	Stewart-Haas Racing with Biagi-DenBeste Racing	Ford
99	Cody Ware	B. J. McLeod Motorsports	Chevrolet

== Practice ==
=== First practice ===
Kyle Busch was the fastest in the first practice session with a time of 72.737 seconds and a speed of 121.259 mph (195.147 km/h).

Pos	No.	Driver	Team	Manufacturer	Time	Speed
1	18	Kyle Busch (i)	Joe Gibbs Racing	Toyota	72.737	121.259
2	12	Ryan Blaney (i)	Team Penske	Ford	73.011	120.804
3	10	A. J. Allmendinger	Kaulig Racing	Chevrolet	73.334	120.272

=== Final practice ===
Kyle Busch was the fastest in the final practice session with a time of 72.377 seconds and a speed of 121.862 mph (196.118 km/h).

Pos	No.	Driver	Team	Manufacturer	Time	Speed
1	18	Kyle Busch (i)	Joe Gibbs Racing	Toyota	72.377	121.862
2	11	Justin Haley (R)	Kaulig Racing	Chevrolet	72.668	121.374
3	22	Austin Cindric	Team Penske	Ford	72.724	121.280

== Qualifying ==
Kyle Busch scored the pole for the race with a time of 71.098 seconds and a speed of 124.054 mph (199.646 km/h).

=== Qualifying results ===
Pos	No	Driver	Team	Manufacturer	Time
1	18	Kyle Busch (i)	Joe Gibbs Racing	Toyota	71.098
2	22	Austin Cindric	Team Penske	Ford	71.768
3	12	Ryan Blaney (i)	Team Penske	Ford	72.111
4	20	Christopher Bell	Joe Gibbs Racing	Toyota	72.310
5	2	Tyler Reddick	Richard Childress Racing	Chevrolet	72.496
6	98	Chase Briscoe (R)	Stewart-Haas Racing with Biagi-DenBeste Racing	Ford	72.622
7	10	A. J. Allmendinger	Kaulig Racing	Chevrolet	72.674
8	8	Ryan Preece (i)	JR Motorsports	Chevrolet	72.700
9	7	Justin Allgaier	JR Motorsports	Chevrolet	72.701
10	19	Brandon Jones	Joe Gibbs Racing	Toyota	72.863
11	51	Jeremy Clements	Jeremy Clements Racing	Chevrolet	72.992
12	11	Justin Haley (R)	Kaulig Racing	Chevrolet	73.192
13	00	Cole Custer	Stewart-Haas Racing with Biagi-DenBeste Racing	Ford	73.096
14	1	Michael Annett	JR Motorsports	Chevrolet	73.291
15	08	Gray Gaulding (R)	SS-Green Light Racing	Chevrolet	73.333
16	93	Josh Bilicki	RSS Racing	Chevrolet	73.411
17	39	Ryan Sieg	RSS Racing	Chevrolet	73.476
18	9	Noah Gragson (R)	JR Motorsports	Chevrolet	73.491
19	4	Ross Chastain (i)	JD Motorsports	Chevrolet	73.699
20	23	John Hunter Nemechek (R)	GMS Racing	Chevrolet	73.976
21	90	Alex Labbé	DGM Racing	Chevrolet	74.175
22	66	Tommy Joe Martins	MBM Motorsports	Toyota	74.519
23	5	Scott Heckert	B. J. McLeod Motorsports	Toyota	74.772
24	07	Ray Black Jr.	SS-Green Light Racing	Chevrolet	75.215
25	38	J. J. Yeley (i)	RSS Racing	Chevrolet	75.472
26	99	Cody Ware	B. J. McLeod Motorsports	Chevrolet	75.609
27	86	Brandon Brown	Brandonbilt Motorsports	Chevrolet	75.885
28	01	Stephen Leicht	JD Motorsports	Chevrolet	76.023
29	0	Garrett Smithley	JD Motorsports	Chevrolet	76.066
30	36	Josh Williams	DGM Racing	Chevrolet	76.330
31	42	Stanton Barrett (i)	MBM Motorsports	Toyota	76.472
32	52	David Starr	Jimmy Means Racing	Chevrolet	77.000
33	15	B. J. McLeod	JD Motorsports	Chevrolet	77.706
34	74	Dan Corcoran (i)	Mike Harmon Racing	Chevrolet	77.787
35	13	Chad Finchum	MBM Motorsports	Toyota	77.805
36	35	Joey Gase	MBM Motorsports	Toyota	78.842
37	78	Vinnie Miller	B. J. McLeod Motorsports	Chevrolet	0.000

== Race ==
=== Summary ===
Kyle Busch started on pole. In the first lap, Tyler Reddick slid through the grass and overshot the carousel, forcing him to pit and remove the grass from his grill. Ross Chastain turned Justin Allgaier into the fence after Allgaier drove across the nose of Chastain's car. In the final lap of Stage 1, Allgaier got revenge and slammed Chastain into the tire wall, ending Chastain's day. Busch took the win for stage 1.

Christopher Bell took the lead afterwards, but was passed by Ryan Blaney, who quickly pulled away. Busch caught up to Blaney with 10 laps remaining in the stage and took the lead going into the carousel, but the suspension of Busch's car broke while exiting the carousel and went off-course, ending his day.

A. J. Allmendinger managed to win Stage 2 until he had to pit, giving the lead to Allgaier, who in turn passed it to Austin Cindric until the caution was thrown for debris in the inner loop with 14 laps remaining. In the next restart, Justin Haley, Josh Bilicki and others got together and brought out the final caution. Allmendinger took the lead on the final restart, battling with Cindric via bumps and runs. In the end, Cindric managed to get by Allmendinger and held him off to win the race.

=== Stage Results ===
Stage One Laps: 20

Pos	No	Driver	Team	Manufacturer	Points
1	18	Kyle Busch (i)	Joe Gibbs Racing	Toyota	0
2	20	Christopher Bell	Joe Gibbs Racing	Toyota	9
3	51	Jeremy Clements	Jeremy Clements Racing	Chevrolet	8
4	11	Justin Haley (R)	Kaulig Racing	Chevrolet	7
5	12	Ryan Blaney (i)	Team Penske	Ford	0
6	8	Ryan Preece (i)	JR Motorsports	Chevrolet	0
7	9	Noah Gragson (R)	JR Motorsports	Chevrolet	4
8	39	Ryan Sieg	RSS Racing	Chevrolet	3
9	08	Gray Gaulding	SS-Green Light Racing	Chevrolet	2
10	23	John Hunter Nemechek (R)	GMS Racing	Chevrolet	1

Stage Two Laps: 20

Pos	No	Driver	Team	Manufacturer	Points
1	12	Ryan Blaney (i)	Team Penske	Ford	0
2	8	Ryan Preece (i)	JR Motorsports	Chevrolet	0
3	22	Austin Cindric	Team Penske	Ford	8
4	98	Chase Briscoe (R)	Stewart-Haas Racing with Biagi-DenBeste	Ford	7
5	23	John Hunter Nemechek (R)	GMS Racing	Chevrolet	6
6	19	Brandon Jones	Joe Gibbs Racing	Toyota	5
7	7	Justin Allgaier	JR Motorsports	Chevrolet	4
8	11	Justin Haley (R)	Kaulig Racing	Chevrolet	3
9	20	Christopher Bell	Joe Gibbs Racing	Toyota	2
10	39	Ryan Sieg	RSS Racing	Chevrolet	1

=== Final Stage Results ===
Stage Three Laps: 42

Pos	Grid	No	Driver	Team	Manufacturer	Laps	Points
1	2	22	Austin Cindric	Team Penske	Ford	82	48
2	4	20	Christopher Bell	Joe Gibbs Racing	Toyota	82	46
3	9	7	Justin Allgaier	JR Motorsports	Chevrolet	82	38
4	3	12	Ryan Blaney (i)	Team Penske	Ford	82	0
5	5	2	Tyler Reddick	Richard Childress Racing	Chevrolet	82	32
6	6	98	Chase Briscoe (R)	Stewart-Haas Racing with Biagi-DenBeste	Ford	82	38
7	13	00	Cole Custer	Stewart-Haas Racing with Biagi-DenBeste	Ford	82	30
8	14	1	Michael Annett	JR Motorsports	Chevrolet	82	29
9	18	9	Noah Gragson (R)	JR Motorsports	Chevrolet	82	32
10	8	8	Ryan Preece (i)	JR Motorsports	Chevrolet	82	0
11	11	51	Jeremy Clements	Jeremy Clements Racing	Chevrolet	82	34
12	20	23	John Hunter Nemechek (R)	GMS Racing	Chevrolet	82	32
13	23	5	Scott Heckert	B. J. McLeod Motorsports	Toyota	82	24
14	12	11	Justin Haley (R)	Kaulig Racing	Chevrolet	82	33
15	15	08	Gray Gaulding (R)	SS-Green Light Racing	Chevrolet	82	24
16	21	90	Alex Labbé	DGM Racing	Chevrolet	82	21
17	10	19	Brandon Jones	Joe Gibbs Racing	Toyota	82	25
18	27	86	Brandon Brown	Brandonbilt Motorsports	Chevrolet	82	19
19	30	36	Josh Williams	DGM Racing	Chevrolet	82	18
20	28	01	Stephen Leicht	JD Motorsports	Chevrolet	82	17
21	26	99	Cody Ware	B. J. McLeod Motorsports	Chevrolet	82	16
22	24	07	Ray Black Jr.	SS-Green Light Racing	Chevrolet	82	15
23	31	42	Stanton Barrett (i)	MBM Motorsports	Toyota	82	0
24	29	0	Garrett Smithley	JD Motorsports	Chevrolet	80	13
25	34	74	Dan Corcoran (i)	Mike Harmon Racing	Chevrolet	75	0
26	16	93	Josh Bilicki	RSS Racing	Chevrolet	72	11
27	33	15	B. J. McLeod	JD Motorsports	Chevrolet	67	10
28	22	66	Tommy Joe Martins	MDM Motorsports	Toyota	65	9
29	32	52	David Starr	Jimmy Means Racing	Chevrolet	57	8
30	17	39	Ryan Sieg	RSS Racing	Chevrolet	47	11
31	1	18	Kyle Busch (i)	Joe Gibbs Racing	Toyota	35	0
32	35	13	Chad Finchum	MDM Motorsports	Toyota	30	5
33	19	4	Ross Chastain (i)	JD Motorsports	Chevrolet	19	0
34	36	35	Joey Gase	MBM Motorsports	Toyota	9	3
35	25	38	J. J. Yeley (i)	RSS Racing	Chevrolet	6	0
36	37	78	Vinnie Miller	B. J. McLeod Motorsports	Chevrolet	0	1
37	7	10	A. J. Allmendinger	Kaulig Racing	Chevrolet	82	1

== After the race ==
A. J. Allmendinger was disqualified (once again) from his runner-up finish after post-race inspection due to the rear of his car being too low. His stage points were also revoked and he was relegated to a 37th place finish. Allmendinger was also disqualified at the July Daytona race a month prior. He stated on Twitter that his car became lower due to contact during an early restart in the race.

Previous race: 2019 U.S. Cellular 250	NASCAR Xfinity Series; 2019 season	Next race: 2019 B&L Transport 170
