= 2019 GEICO 500 =

Tenth race of the 2019 Monster Energy Cup Series

Race details
- Race 10 of 36 in the 2019 Monster Energy NASCAR Cup Series
- Date: April 28, 2019
- Location: Talladega Superspeedway in Lincoln, Alabama
- Course: Permanent racing facility
- Course length: 2.66 miles (4.28 km)
- Distance: 188 laps, 500.08 mi (804.64 km)
- Average speed: 161.331 miles per hour (259.637 km/h)

Pole position
Driver	Austin Dillon	Richard Childress Racing
- Time: 49.734

Most laps led
Driver	Chase Elliott	Hendrick Motorsports
- Laps: 44

Winner
No. 9	Chase Elliott	Hendrick Motorsports

Television in the United States
- Network: Fox
- Announcers: Mike Joy, Jeff Gordon and Darrell Waltrip
- Nielsen ratings: 4.521 million

Radio in the United States
- Radio: MRN
- Booth announcers: Alex Hayden, Jeff Striegle, and Dale Jarrett
- Turn announcers: Dave Moody (1 & 2), Mike Bagley (Backstretch) and Kurt Becker (3 & 4)

The 2019 GEICO 500 was a Monster Energy NASCAR Cup Series race held on April 28, 2019, at Talladega Superspeedway in Lincoln, Alabama. Contested over 188 laps on the 2.66 mile (4.28 km) superspeedway, it was the 10th race of the 2019 Monster Energy NASCAR Cup Series season.

== Report ==
=== Background ===
Talladega Superspeedway, the track where the race will be held

Talladega Superspeedway, formerly known as Alabama International Motor Speedway, is a motorsports complex located north of Talladega, Alabama. It is located on the former Anniston Air Force Base in the small city of Lincoln. A tri-oval, the track was constructed in 1969 by the International Speedway Corporation, a business controlled by the France family. Talladega is most known for its steep banking. The track currently hosts NASCAR's Monster Energy NASCAR Cup Series, Xfinity Series and Gander Outdoors Truck Series. Talladega is the longest NASCAR oval with a length of 2.66-mile-long (4.28 km) tri-oval like the Daytona International Speedway, which is a 2.5-mile-long (4.0 km).

==== Entry list ====
No.	Driver	Team	Manufacturer
00	Landon Cassill (i)	StarCom Racing	Chevrolet
1	Kurt Busch	Chip Ganassi Racing	Chevrolet
2	Brad Keselowski	Team Penske	Ford
3	Austin Dillon	Richard Childress Racing	Chevrolet
4	Kevin Harvick	Stewart-Haas Racing	Ford
6	Ryan Newman	Roush Fenway Racing	Ford
8	Daniel Hemric (R)	Richard Childress Racing	Chevrolet
9	Chase Elliott	Hendrick Motorsports	Chevrolet
10	Aric Almirola	Stewart-Haas Racing	Ford
11	Denny Hamlin	Joe Gibbs Racing	Toyota
12	Ryan Blaney	Team Penske	Ford
13	Ty Dillon	Germain Racing	Chevrolet
14	Clint Bowyer	Stewart-Haas Racing	Ford
15	Ross Chastain (i)	Premium Motorsports	Chevrolet
17	Ricky Stenhouse Jr.	Roush Fenway Racing	Ford
18	Kyle Busch	Joe Gibbs Racing	Toyota
19	Martin Truex Jr.	Joe Gibbs Racing	Toyota
20	Erik Jones	Joe Gibbs Racing	Toyota
21	Paul Menard	Wood Brothers Racing	Ford
22	Joey Logano	Team Penske	Ford
24	William Byron	Hendrick Motorsports	Chevrolet
27	Reed Sorenson	Premium Motorsports	Chevrolet
32	Corey LaJoie	Go Fas Racing	Ford
34	Michael McDowell	Front Row Motorsports	Ford
36	Matt Tifft (R)	Front Row Motorsports	Ford
37	Chris Buescher	JTG Daugherty Racing	Chevrolet
38	David Ragan	Front Row Motorsports	Ford
41	Daniel Suárez	Stewart-Haas Racing	Ford
42	Kyle Larson	Chip Ganassi Racing	Chevrolet
43	Bubba Wallace	Richard Petty Motorsports	Chevrolet
47	Ryan Preece (R)	JTG Daugherty Racing	Chevrolet
48	Jimmie Johnson	Hendrick Motorsports	Chevrolet
51	Cody Ware (R)	Petty Ware Racing	Ford
52	Stanton Barrett	Rick Ware Racing	Chevrolet
62	Brendan Gaughan (i)	Beard Motorsports	Chevrolet
77	Justin Haley (i)	Spire Motorsports	Chevrolet
81	Jeffrey Earnhardt (i)	XCI Racing	Toyota
88	Alex Bowman	Hendrick Motorsports	Chevrolet
95	Matt DiBenedetto	Leavine Family Racing	Toyota
96	Parker Kligerman (i)	Gaunt Brothers Racing	Toyota
Official entry list

== Practice ==
=== First practice ===
Kurt Busch was the fastest in the first practice session with a time of 47.249 seconds and a speed of 202.671 mph (326.167 km/h).

Pos	No.	Driver	Team	Manufacturer	Time	Speed
1	1	Kurt Busch	Chip Ganassi Racing	Chevrolet	47.249	202.671
2	38	David Ragan	Front Row Motorsports	Ford	47.253	202.654
3	20	Erik Jones	Joe Gibbs Racing	Toyota	47.253	202.654
Official first practice results

=== Final practice ===
Ryan Newman was the fastest in the final practice session with a time of 46.905 seconds and a speed of 204.157 mph (328.559 km/h).

Pos	No.	Driver	Team	Manufacturer	Time	Speed
1	6	Ryan Newman	Roush Fenway Racing	Ford	46.905	204.157
2	17	Ricky Stenhouse Jr.	Roush Fenway Racing	Ford	46.912	204.127
3	19	Martin Truex Jr.	Joe Gibbs Racing	Toyota	46.915	204.114
Official final practice results

== Qualifying ==
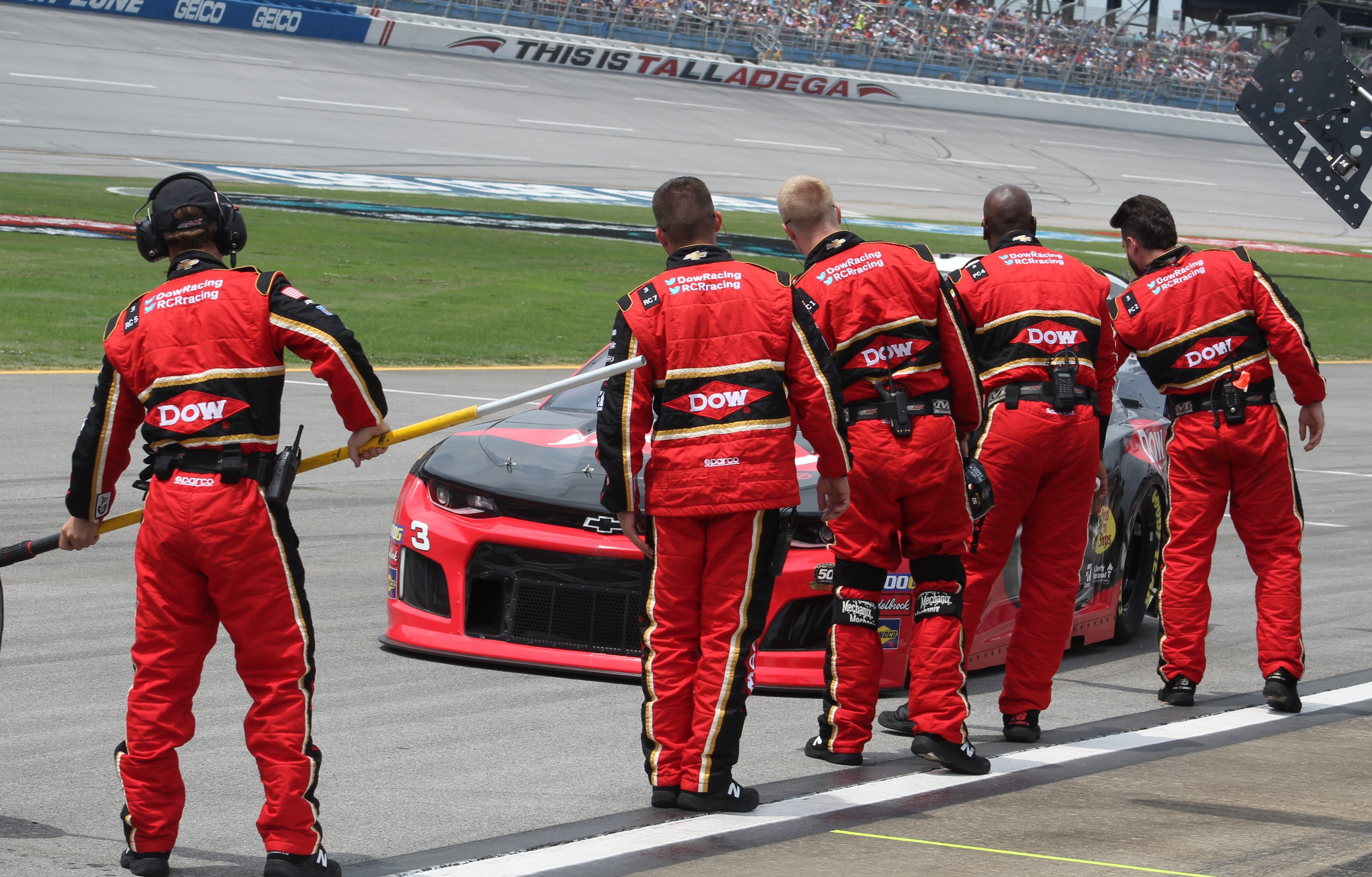
Austin Dillon started from pole position.

Austin Dillon scored the pole for the race with a time of 49.734 and a speed of 192.544 mph (309.870 km/h).

=== Qualifying results ===
Pos	No.	Driver	Team	Manufacturer	R1	R2
1	3	Austin Dillon	Richard Childress Racing	Chevrolet	49.847	49.734
2	10	Aric Almirola	Stewart-Haas Racing	Ford	49.791	49.841
3	14	Clint Bowyer	Stewart-Haas Racing	Ford	50.115	49.947
4	2	Brad Keselowski	Team Penske	Ford	50.048	49.965
5	8	Daniel Hemric (R)	Richard Childress Racing	Chevrolet	50.083	50.022
6	17	Ricky Stenhouse Jr.	Roush Fenway Racing	Ford	50.204	50.037
7	12	Ryan Blaney	Team Penske	Ford	50.124	50.080
8	22	Joey Logano	Team Penske	Ford	50.220	50.112
9	88	Alex Bowman	Hendrick Motorsports	Chevrolet	50.218	50.164
10	42	Kyle Larson	Chip Ganassi Racing	Chevrolet	50.178	50.193
11	9	Chase Elliott	Hendrick Motorsports	Chevrolet	50.246	50.201
12	34	Michael McDowell	Front Row Motorsports	Ford	50.135	50.251
13	13	Ty Dillon	Germain Racing	Chevrolet	50.310	—
14	1	Kurt Busch	Chip Ganassi Racing	Chevrolet	50.316	—
15	38	David Ragan	Front Row Motorsports	Ford	50.344	—
16	41	Daniel Suárez	Stewart-Haas Racing	Ford	50.419	—
17	21	Paul Menard	Wood Brothers Racing	Ford	50.421	—
18	36	Matt Tifft (R)	Front Row Motorsports	Ford	50.447	—
19	4	Kevin Harvick	Stewart-Haas Racing	Ford	50.450	—
20	19	Martin Truex Jr.	Joe Gibbs Racing	Toyota	50.482	—
21	48	Jimmie Johnson	Hendrick Motorsports	Chevrolet	50.519	—
22	18	Kyle Busch	Joe Gibbs Racing	Toyota	50.593	—
23	11	Denny Hamlin	Joe Gibbs Racing	Toyota	50.596	—
24	6	Ryan Newman	Roush Fenway Racing	Ford	50.614	—
25	24	William Byron	Hendrick Motorsports	Chevrolet	50.699	—
26	95	Matt DiBenedetto	Leavine Family Racing	Toyota	50.817	—
27	20	Erik Jones	Joe Gibbs Racing	Toyota	50.821	—
28	43	Bubba Wallace	Richard Petty Motorsports	Chevrolet	50.870	—
29	62	Tyler Reddick (i)	Beard Motorsports	Chevrolet	51.170	—
30	47	Ryan Preece (R)	JTG Daugherty Racing	Chevrolet	51.269	—
31	37	Chris Buescher	JTG Daugherty Racing	Chevrolet	51.374	—
32	00	Landon Cassill (i)	StarCom Racing	Chevrolet	51.382	—
33	81	Jeffrey Earnhardt (i)	XCI Racing	Toyota	51.432	—
34	15	Ross Chastain (i)	Premium Motorsports	Chevrolet	51.800	—
35	96	Parker Kligerman (i)	Gaunt Brothers Racing	Toyota	52.081	—
36	32	Corey LaJoie	Go Fas Racing	Ford	52.100	—
37	27	Reed Sorenson	Premium Motorsports	Chevrolet	52.184	—
38	77	Justin Haley (i)	Spire Motorsports	Chevrolet	52.197	—
39	52	Stanton Barrett	Rick Ware Racing	Chevrolet	52.984	—
40	51	Cody Ware (R)	Petty Ware Racing	Ford	53.148	—
Official qualifying results

- Tyler Reddick practiced and qualified the No. 62 for Brendan Gaughan, who was attending his son’s first communion.
- Eight cars failed post-qualifying inspection and would be forced to drop to the rear at the start (Nos. 6, 11, 17, 18, 19, 20, 27, 51)

== Race ==
=== Stage Results ===
Stage One Laps: 55

Pos	No	Driver	Team	Manufacturer	Points
1	13	Ty Dillon	Germain Racing	Chevrolet	10
2	88	Alex Bowman	Hendrick Motorsports	Chevrolet	9
3	3	Austin Dillon	Richard Childress Racing	Chevrolet	8
4	9	Chase Elliott	Hendrick Motorsports	Chevrolet	7
5	41	Daniel Suárez	Stewart-Haas Racing	Ford	6
6	6	Ryan Newman	Roush Fenway Racing	Ford	5
7	24	William Byron	Hendrick Motorsports	Chevrolet	4
8	17	Ricky Stenhouse Jr.	Roush Fenway Racing	Ford	3
9	18	Kyle Busch	Joe Gibbs Racing	Toyota	2
10	95	Matt DiBenedetto	Leavine Family Racing	Toyota	1
Official stage one results

Stage Two Laps: 55

Pos	No	Driver	Team	Manufacturer	Points
1	9	Chase Elliott	Hendrick Motorsports	Chevrolet	10
2	88	Alex Bowman	Hendrick Motorsports	Chevrolet	9
3	24	William Byron	Hendrick Motorsports	Chevrolet	8
4	12	Ryan Blaney	Team Penske	Ford	7
5	3	Austin Dillon	Richard Childress Racing	Chevrolet	6
6	1	Kurt Busch	Chip Ganassi Racing	Chevrolet	5
7	42	Kyle Larson	Chip Ganassi Racing	Chevrolet	4
8	8	Daniel Hemric	Richard Childress Racing	Chevrolet	3
9	22	Joey Logano	Team Penske	Ford	2
10	18	Kyle Busch	Joe Gibbs Racing	Toyota	1
Official stage two results

=== Final Stage Results ===
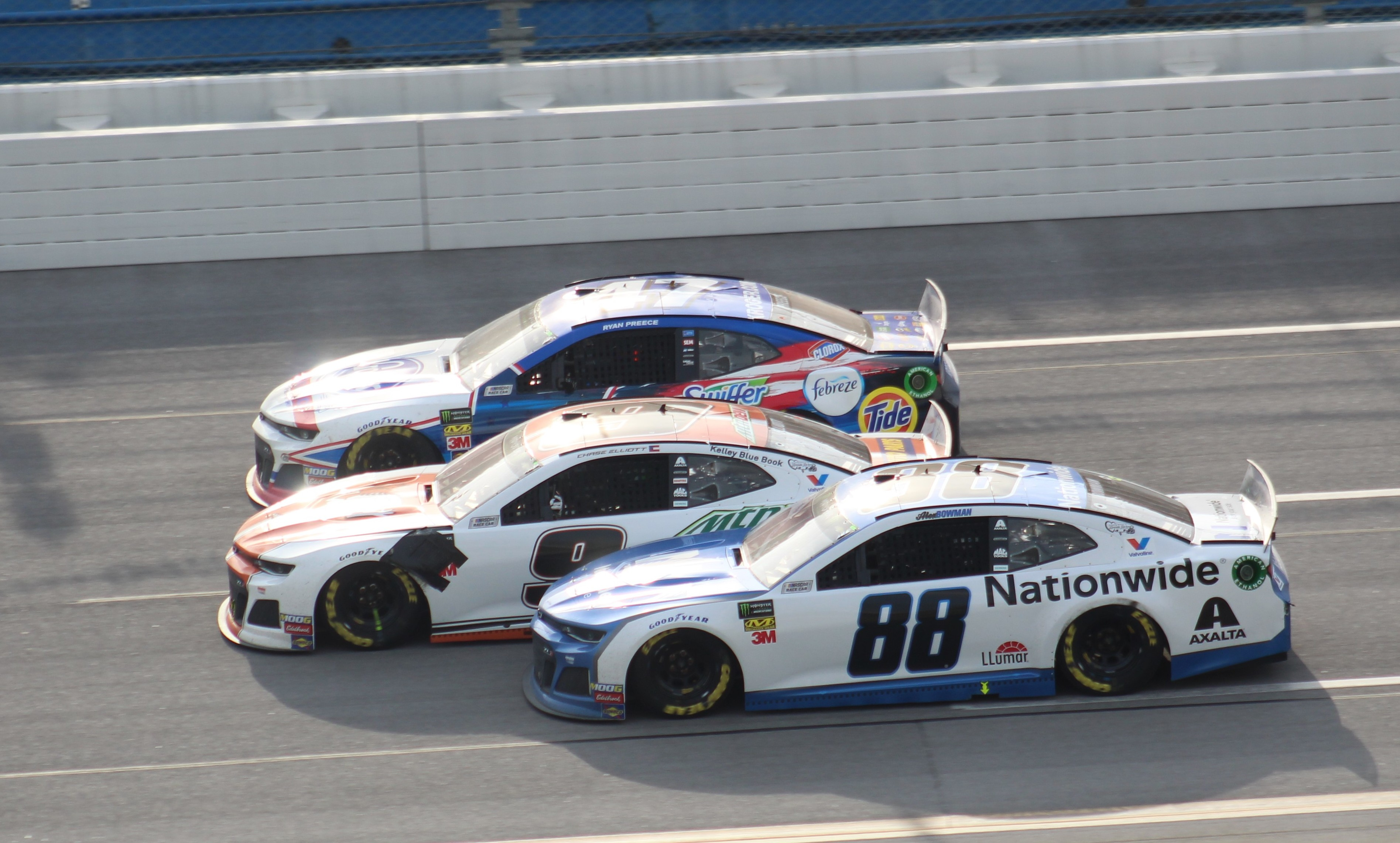
The finish.

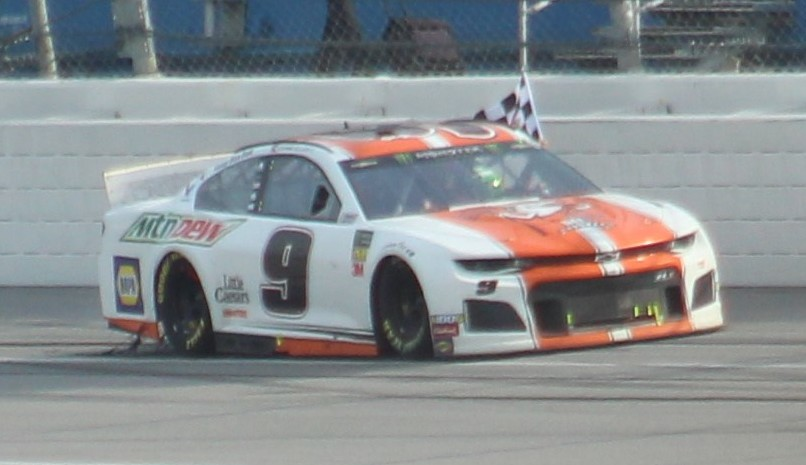
Chase Elliott celebrating victory lap.

Stage Three Laps: 78

Pos	Grid	No	Driver	Team	Manufacturer	Laps	Points
1	11	9	Chase Elliott	Hendrick Motorsports	Chevrolet	188	57
2	9	88	Alex Bowman	Hendrick Motorsports	Chevrolet	188	53
3	30	47	Ryan Preece (R)	JTG Daugherty Racing	Chevrolet	188	34
4	8	22	Joey Logano	Team Penske	Ford	188	35
5	5	8	Daniel Hemric (R)	Richard Childress Racing	Chevrolet	188	35
6	14	1	Kurt Busch	Chip Ganassi Racing	Chevrolet	188	36
7	24	6	Ryan Newman	Roush Fenway Racing	Ford	188	35
8	29	62	Brendan Gaughan (i)	Beard Motorsports	Chevrolet	188	0
9	2	10	Aric Almirola	Stewart-Haas Racing	Ford	188	28
10	22	18	Kyle Busch	Joe Gibbs Racing	Toyota	188	30
11	36	32	Corey LaJoie	Go Fas Racing	Ford	188	26
12	16	41	Daniel Suárez	Stewart-Haas Racing	Ford	188	31
13	4	2	Brad Keselowski	Team Penske	Ford	188	24
14	1	3	Austin Dillon	Richard Childress Racing	Chevrolet	188	37
15	7	12	Ryan Blaney	Team Penske	Ford	188	29
16	17	21	Paul Menard	Wood Brothers Racing	Ford	188	21
17	13	13	Ty Dillon	Germain Racing	Chevrolet	188	30
18	37	27	Reed Sorenson	Premium Motorsports	Chevrolet	188	19
19	27	20	Erik Jones	Joe Gibbs Racing	Toyota	188	18
20	20	19	Martin Truex Jr.	Joe Gibbs Racing	Toyota	188	17
21	25	24	William Byron	Hendrick Motorsports	Chevrolet	188	28
22	33	81	Jeffrey Earnhardt (i)	XCI Racing	Toyota	187	0
23	15	38	David Ragan	Front Row Motorsports	Ford	187	14
24	10	42	Kyle Larson	Chip Ganassi Racing	Chevrolet	187	17
25	6	17	Ricky Stenhouse Jr.	Roush Fenway Racing	Ford	187	15
26	34	15	Ross Chastain (i)	Premium Motorsports	Chevrolet	187	0
27	35	96	Parker Kligerman (i)	Gaunt Brothers Racing	Toyota	186	0
28	40	51	Cody Ware (R)	Petty Ware Racing	Ford	184	9
29	3	14	Clint Bowyer	Stewart-Haas Racing	Ford	182	8
30	31	37	Chris Buescher	JTG Daugherty Racing	Chevrolet	181	7
31	26	95	Matt DiBenedetto	Leavine Family Racing	Toyota	181	7
32	38	77	Justin Haley (i)	Spire Motorsports	Chevrolet	180	0
33	21	48	Jimmie Johnson	Hendrick Motorsports	Chevrolet	178	4
34	32	00	Landon Cassill (i)	StarCom Racing	Chevrolet	154	0
35	39	52	Stanton Barrett	Rick Ware Racing	Chevrolet	132	2
36	23	11	Denny Hamlin	Joe Gibbs Racing	Toyota	80	1
37	18	36	Matt Tifft (R)	Front Row Motorsports	Ford	11	1
38	19	4	Kevin Harvick	Stewart-Haas Racing	Ford	11	1
39	28	43	Bubba Wallace	Richard Petty Motorsports	Chevrolet	10	1
40	12	34	Michael McDowell	Front Row Motorsports	Ford	10	1
Official race results

=== Race statistics ===
- Lead changes: 37 among 15 different drivers
- Cautions/Laps: 6 for 21
- Red flags: 1 for 8 minutes and 47 seconds
- Time of race: 3 hours, 5 minutes and 59 seconds
- Average speed: 161.331 miles per hour (259.637 km/h)

== Media ==
=== Television ===
Fox Sports covered their 19th race at the Talladega Superspeedway. Mike Joy, six-time Talladega winner – and all-time restrictor plate race wins record holder – Jeff Gordon and four-time Talladega winner Darrell Waltrip called the race in the booth for the race. Jamie Little, Vince Welch and Matt Yocum handled the action on pit road for the television side.

Fox Television
Booth announcers	Pit reporters
Lap-by-lap: Mike Joy; Color-commentator: Jeff Gordon; Color commentator: Darrell Waltrip	Jamie Little; Vince Welch; Matt Yocum

=== Radio ===
MRN had the radio call for the race which was also simulcast on Sirius XM NASCAR Radio. Alex Hayden, Jeff Striegle and two-time Talladega winner Dale Jarrett called the race in the booth when the field raced through the tri-oval. Dave Moody called the race from the Sunoco spotters stand outside turn 2 when the field raced through turns 1 and 2. Mike Bagley called the race from a platform inside the backstretch when the field raced down the backstretch. Kurt Becker called the race from the Sunoco spotters stand outside turn 4 when the field raced through turns 3 and 4. Winston Kelley, Kim Coon, Steve Post, and Dillon Welch worked pit road for the radio side.

MRN Radio
Booth announcers	Turn announcers	Pit reporters
Lead announcer: Alex Hayden; Announcer: Jeff Striegle; Announcer: Dale Jarrett	Turns 1 & 2: Dave Moody; Backstretch: Mike Bagley; Turns 3 & 4: Kurt Becker	Winston Kelley; Kim Coon; Steve Post; Dillon Welch

== Standings after the race ==
Drivers' Championship standings

	Pos	Driver	Points
	1	Kyle Busch	430
	2	Joey Logano	415 (–15)
	3	Denny Hamlin	367 (–63)
	4	Kevin Harvick	350 (–80)
	5	Brad Keselowski	337 (–93)
	6	Martin Truex Jr.	328 (–102)
3	7	Chase Elliott	324 (–106)
1	8	Kurt Busch	323 (–107)
	9	Ryan Blaney	306 (–124)
2	10	Clint Bowyer	288 (–142)
	11	Aric Almirola	288 (–142)
	12	Daniel Suárez	266 (–164)
2	13	Ryan Newman	251 (–179)
	14	Austin Dillon	243 (–187)
6	15	Alex Bowman	239 (–191)
3	16	Jimmie Johnson	238 (–192)
Official driver's standings

Manufacturers' Championship standings

Pos	Manufacturer	Points
1	Toyota	370
2	Ford	359 (–11)
3	Chevrolet	332 (–38)

- Note: Only the first 16 positions are included for the driver standings.
- . – Driver has clinched a position in the Monster Energy NASCAR Cup Series playoffs.

Previous race: 2019 Toyota Owners 400	Monster Energy NASCAR Cup Series; 2019 season	Next race: 2019 Gander RV 400
