= 2020 Go Bowling 235 =

NASCAR Cup Series race

Race details
- Race 23 of 36 in the 2020 NASCAR Cup Series
- 2020 Go Bowling 235 program cover
- Date: August 16, 2020
- Location: Daytona International Speedway in Daytona Beach, Florida
- Course: Permanent racing facility
- Course length: 3.61 miles (5.81 km)
- Distance: 65 laps, 234.65 mi (377.633 km)
- Average speed: 89.39 miles per hour (143.86 km/h)

Pole position
Driver	Kevin Harvick	Stewart-Haas Racing
- Grid positions set by competition-based formula

Most laps led
Driver	Chase Elliott	Hendrick Motorsports
- Laps: 34

Winner
No. 9	Chase Elliott	Hendrick Motorsports

Television in the United States
- Network: NBC
- Announcers: Rick Allen, Jeff Burton, Steve Letarte and Dale Earnhardt Jr.
- Nielsen ratings: 3.237 million

Radio in the United States
- Radio: MRN
- Booth announcers: Alex Hayden, Jeff Striegle and Rusty Wallace
- Turn announcers: Dave Moody (Infield Section: Turns 2–6); Mike Bagley (Turns 7–10); Kyle Rickey (Turns 11–14)

The 2020 Go Bowling 235 was a NASCAR Cup Series raced on August 16, 2020, at Daytona International Speedway in Daytona Beach, Florida. Contested over 65 laps on the 3.61-mile (5.81 km) road course, it was the 23rd race of the 2020 NASCAR Cup Series season, which was a replacement race for the Watkins Glen round because of government restrictions due to the COVID-19 pandemic.

The race had three stages: the first two stages at 15 laps each, and 35 for the final.

== Background ==
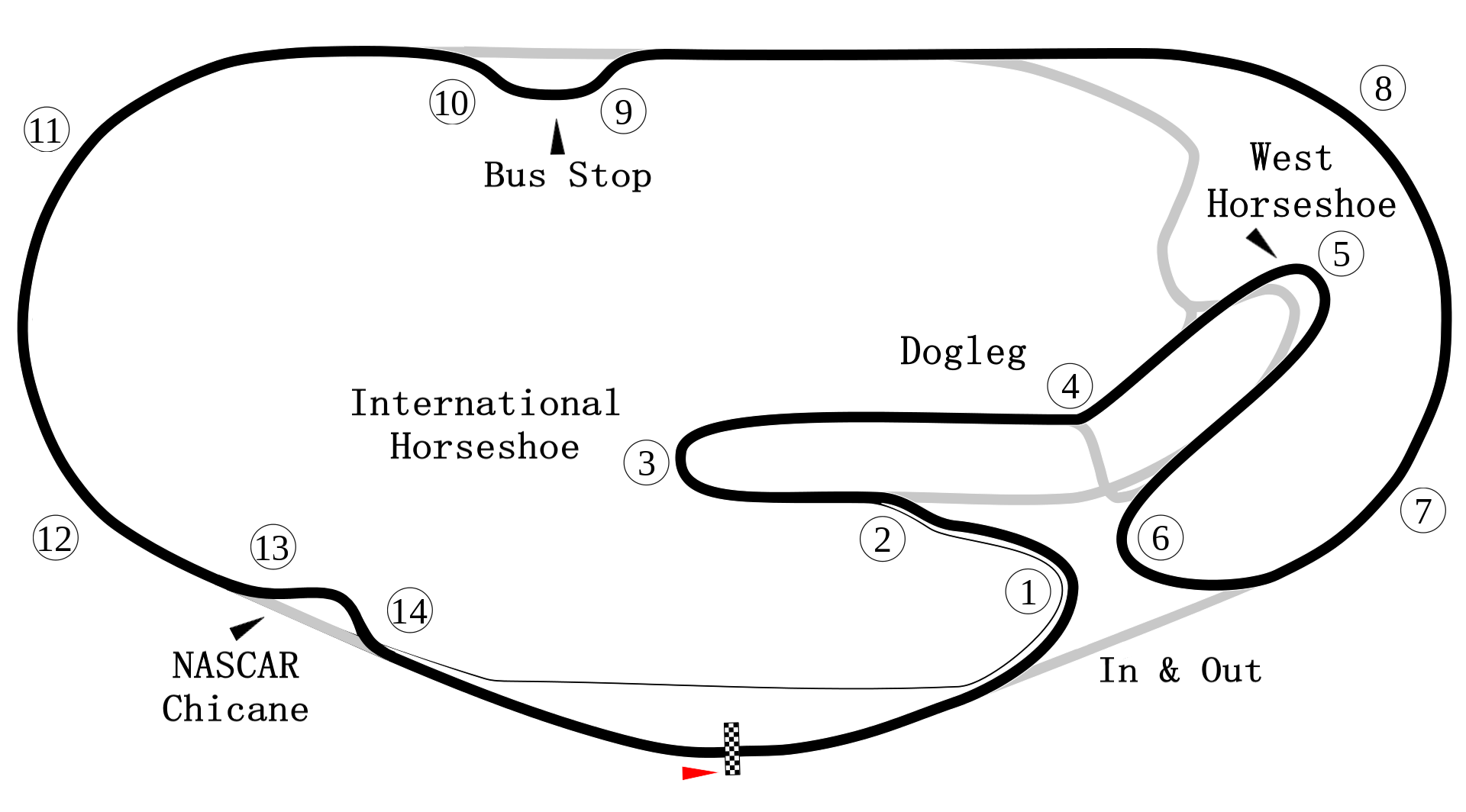
Daytona International Speedway, the site of the race.

The race was held at Daytona International Speedway, a race track located in Daytona Beach, Florida, United States. Since its opening in 1959, the track has been the home of the Daytona 500, the most prestigious race in NASCAR. In addition to NASCAR, the track also hosts ARCA, AMA Superbike, USCC, SCCA, and Motocross races. It features multiple layouts including the primary 2.5 miles (4.0 km) high speed tri-oval, a 3.56 miles (5.73 km) sports car course, a 2.95 miles (4.75 km) motorcycle course, and a .25 miles (0.40 km) karting and motorcycle flat-track. The track's 180-acre (73 ha) infield includes the 29-acre (12 ha) Lake Lloyd, which has hosted powerboat racing. The speedway is owned and operated by International Speedway Corporation.

The track was built in 1959 by NASCAR founder William "Bill" France, Sr. to host racing held at the former Daytona Beach Road Course. His banked design permitted higher speeds and gave fans a better view of the cars. Lights were installed around the track in 1998 and today, it is the third-largest single lit outdoor sports facility. The speedway has been renovated three times, with the infield renovated in 2004 and the track repaved twice — in 1978 and in 2010. On January 22, 2013, the track unveiled artist depictions of a renovated speedway. On July 5 of that year, ground was broken for a project that would remove the backstretch seating and completely redevelop the frontstretch seating. The renovation to the speedway was done by Rossetti Architects. The project, named "Daytona Rising", was completed in January 2016, at a cost of US $400 million, placing emphasis on improving fan experience with five expanded and redesigned fan entrances (called "injectors") as well as wider and more comfortable seating with more restrooms and concession stands. After the renovations, the track's grandstands included 101,000 permanent seats with the ability to increase permanent seating to 125,000. The project was completed before the start of Speedweeks.

On July 30, it was revealed after simulation testing revealed concerns of high speeds entering turn 1 (a turn already considered to be difficult among road racers), a temporary chicane was added in between the 4th turn of the oval and the entrance to pit road (similar to the Charlotte Roval). NASCAR further announced that it would use the high-downforce aero package used for the road course races in 2019 (in 2020, road courses were scheduled to use a low-downforce package similar to what was used in 2018 and what is used on ovals 1-mile or shorter in 2020). The addition of the chicane increased the length of the course from 3.56 to 3.61 miles and added a 13th and 14th turn to the original 12-turn layout.

== Entry list ==
- (R) denotes rookie driver.
- (i) denotes driver who are ineligible for series driver points.

No.	Driver	Team	Manufacturer
00	Quin Houff (R)	StarCom Racing	Chevrolet
1	Kurt Busch	Chip Ganassi Racing	Chevrolet
2	Brad Keselowski	Team Penske	Ford
3	Kaz Grala (i)	Richard Childress Racing	Chevrolet
4	Kevin Harvick	Stewart-Haas Racing	Ford
6	Ryan Newman	Roush Fenway Racing	Ford
8	Tyler Reddick (R)	Richard Childress Racing	Chevrolet
9	Chase Elliott	Hendrick Motorsports	Chevrolet
10	Aric Almirola	Stewart-Haas Racing	Ford
11	Denny Hamlin	Joe Gibbs Racing	Toyota
12	Ryan Blaney	Team Penske	Ford
13	Ty Dillon	Germain Racing	Chevrolet
14	Clint Bowyer	Stewart-Haas Racing	Ford
15	Brennan Poole (R)	Premium Motorsports	Chevrolet
17	Chris Buescher	Roush Fenway Racing	Ford
18	Kyle Busch	Joe Gibbs Racing	Toyota
19	Martin Truex Jr.	Joe Gibbs Racing	Toyota
20	Erik Jones	Joe Gibbs Racing	Toyota
21	Matt DiBenedetto	Wood Brothers Racing	Ford
22	Joey Logano	Team Penske	Ford
24	William Byron	Hendrick Motorsports	Chevrolet
27	J. J. Yeley (i)	Rick Ware Racing	Ford
32	Corey LaJoie	Go Fas Racing	Ford
34	Michael McDowell	Front Row Motorsports	Ford
37	Ryan Preece	JTG Daugherty Racing	Chevrolet
38	John Hunter Nemechek (R)	Front Row Motorsports	Ford
41	Cole Custer (R)	Stewart-Haas Racing	Ford
42	Matt Kenseth	Chip Ganassi Racing	Chevrolet
43	Bubba Wallace	Richard Petty Motorsports	Chevrolet
47	Ricky Stenhouse Jr.	JTG Daugherty Racing	Chevrolet
48	Jimmie Johnson	Hendrick Motorsports	Chevrolet
51	James Davison	Petty Ware Racing	Chevrolet
53	Garrett Smithley (i)	Rick Ware Racing	Ford
62	Brendan Gaughan	Beard Motorsports	Chevrolet
66	Timmy Hill (i)	MBM Motorsports	Toyota
77	Stanton Barrett	Spire Motorsports	Chevrolet
88	Alex Bowman	Hendrick Motorsports	Chevrolet
95	Christopher Bell (R)	Leavine Family Racing	Toyota
96	Daniel Suárez	Gaunt Brothers Racing	Toyota
Official entry list

== Qualifying ==
Kevin Harvick was awarded the pole for the race as determined by a new formula that NASCAR officials announced on August 6. The formula will use three performance metrics, which will be weighted and averaged to determine the lineup and pit selection order. The metrics are Finishing position from the previous race (weighted 50%), Ranking in team owner points standings (35%), and Fastest lap from the previous race (15%). The success of this system led to NASCAR replacing the traditional rules for determining starting positions of owner points, then race winners, and then most qualifying attempts (with owner points as the tiebreaker) in the 2021 season if qualifying cannot be held because of inclement weather in the eight races where practice and qualifying cannot be conducted, and expanded in the 2022 season to determining practice and qualifying groups for all races.

Kaz Grala replaced Austin Dillon, who was medically disqualified by NASCAR after a positive virus test. NASCAR further restricted drivers from participation in more than one race during the weekend, which meant typical Xfinity drivers who would substitute would not be permitted to participate in the Cup race. NASCAR did allow an Xfinity Series driver who was still on premises to relieve for a Cup driver in Sunday's event who fell ill.

=== Starting Lineup ===
Pos	No.	Driver	Team	Manufacturer
1	4	Kevin Harvick	Stewart-Haas Racing	Ford
2	11	Denny Hamlin	Joe Gibbs Racing	Toyota
3	19	Martin Truex Jr.	Joe Gibbs Racing	Toyota
4	18	Kyle Busch	Joe Gibbs Racing	Toyota
5	22	Joey Logano	Team Penske	Ford
6	10	Aric Almirola	Stewart-Haas Racing	Ford
7	9	Chase Elliott	Hendrick Motorsports	Chevrolet
8	1	Kurt Busch	Chip Ganassi Racing	Chevrolet
9	21	Matt DiBenedetto	Wood Brothers Racing	Ford
10	3	Kaz Grala (i)	Richard Childress Racing	Chevrolet
11	48	Jimmie Johnson	Hendrick Motorsports	Chevrolet
12	14	Clint Bowyer	Stewart-Haas Racing	Ford
13	24	William Byron	Hendrick Motorsports	Chevrolet
14	6	Ryan Newman	Roush Fenway Racing	Ford
15	95	Christopher Bell (R)	Leavine Family Racing	Toyota
16	42	Matt Kenseth	Chip Ganassi Racing	Chevrolet
17	2	Brad Keselowski	Team Penske	Ford
18	8	Tyler Reddick (R)	Richard Childress Racing	Chevrolet
19	43	Bubba Wallace	Richard Petty Motorsports	Chevrolet
20	20	Erik Jones	Joe Gibbs Racing	Toyota
21	17	Chris Buescher	Roush Fenway Racing	Ford
22	37	Ryan Preece	JTG Daugherty Racing	Chevrolet
23	13	Ty Dillon	Germain Racing	Chevrolet
24	12	Ryan Blaney	Team Penske	Ford
25	47	Ricky Stenhouse Jr.	JTG Daugherty Racing	Chevrolet
26	41	Cole Custer (R)	Stewart-Haas Racing	Ford
27	88	Alex Bowman	Hendrick Motorsports	Chevrolet
28	38	John Hunter Nemechek (R)	Front Row Motorsports	Ford
29	32	Corey LaJoie	Go Fas Racing	Ford
30	34	Michael McDowell	Front Row Motorsports	Ford
31	96	Daniel Suárez	Gaunt Brothers Racing	Toyota
32	27	J. J. Yeley (i)	Rick Ware Racing	Ford
33	15	Brennan Poole (R)	Premium Motorsports	Chevrolet
34	77	Stanton Barrett	Spire Motorsports	Chevrolet
35	00	Quin Houff (R)	StarCom Racing	Chevrolet
36	53	Garrett Smithley (i)	Rick Ware Racing	Ford
37	66	Timmy Hill (i)	MBM Motorsports	Toyota
38	51	James Davison	Petty Ware Racing	Chevrolet
39	62	Brendan Gaughan	Beard Motorsports	Chevrolet
Official starting lineup

== Race ==
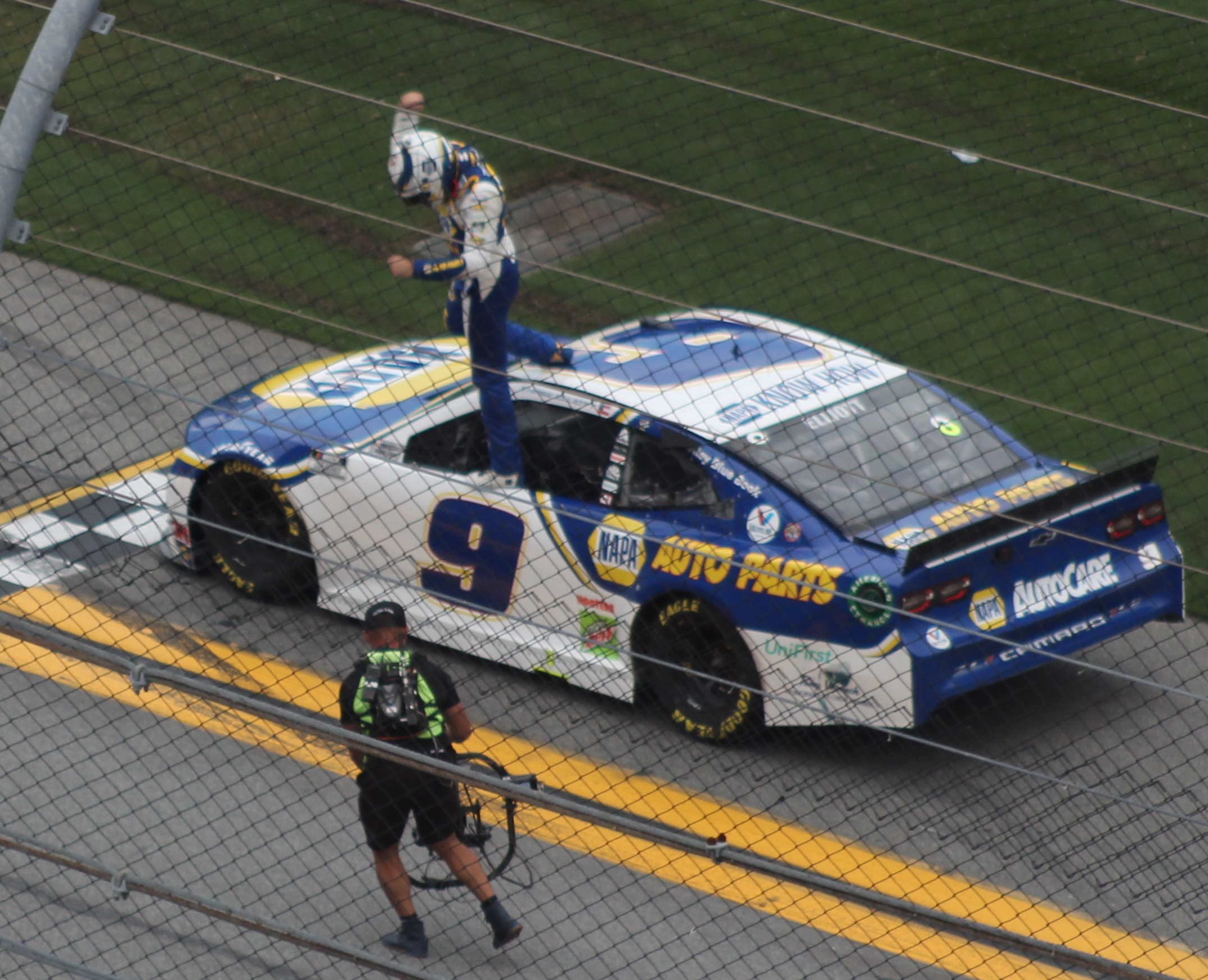
Chase Elliott celebrates his win

=== Stage Results ===
Stage One Laps: 15

Pos	No	Driver	Team	Manufacturer	Points
1	9	Chase Elliott	Hendrick Motorsports	Chevrolet	10
2	22	Joey Logano	Team Penske	Ford	9
3	48	Jimmie Johnson	Hendrick Motorsports	Chevrolet	8
4	14	Clint Bowyer	Stewart-Haas Racing	Ford	7
5	21	Matt DiBenedetto	Wood Brothers Racing	Ford	6
6	20	Erik Jones	Joe Gibbs Racing	Toyota	5
7	24	William Byron	Hendrick Motorsports	Chevrolet	4
8	19	Martin Truex Jr.	Joe Gibbs Racing	Toyota	3
9	41	Cole Custer (R)	Stewart-Haas Racing	Ford	2
10	37	Ryan Preece	JTG Daugherty Racing	Chevrolet	1
Official stage one results

Stage Two Laps: 15

Pos	No	Driver	Team	Manufacturer	Points
1	11	Denny Hamlin	Joe Gibbs Racing	Toyota	10
2	14	Clint Bowyer	Stewart-Haas Racing	Ford	9
3	12	Ryan Blaney	Team Penske	Ford	8
4	24	William Byron	Hendrick Motorsports	Chevrolet	7
5	47	Ricky Stenhouse Jr.	JTG Daugherty Racing	Chevrolet	6
6	37	Ryan Preece	JTG Daugherty Racing	Chevrolet	5
7	9	Chase Elliott	Hendrick Motorsports	Chevrolet	4
8	4	Kevin Harvick	Stewart-Haas Racing	Ford	3
9	1	Kurt Busch	Chip Ganassi Racing	Chevrolet	2
10	32	Corey LaJoie	Go Fas Racing	Ford	1
Official stage two results

=== Final Stage Results ===
Stage Three Laps: 35

Pos	Grid	No	Driver	Team	Manufacturer	Laps	Points
1	7	9	Chase Elliott	Hendrick Motorsports	Chevrolet	65	54
2	2	11	Denny Hamlin	Joe Gibbs Racing	Toyota	65	45
3	3	19	Martin Truex Jr.	Joe Gibbs Racing	Toyota	65	37
4	11	48	Jimmie Johnson	Hendrick Motorsports	Chevrolet	65	41
5	21	17	Chris Buescher	Roush Fenway Racing	Ford	65	32
6	12	14	Clint Bowyer	Stewart-Haas Racing	Ford	65	47
7	10	3	Kaz Grala (i)	Richard Childress Racing	Chevrolet	65	0
8	13	24	William Byron	Hendrick Motorsports	Chevrolet	65	40
9	5	22	Joey Logano	Team Penske	Ford	65	37
10	30	34	Michael McDowell	Front Row Motorsports	Ford	65	27
11	20	20	Erik Jones	Joe Gibbs Racing	Toyota	65	31
12	27	88	Alex Bowman	Hendrick Motorsports	Chevrolet	65	25
13	17	2	Brad Keselowski	Team Penske	Ford	65	24
14	8	1	Kurt Busch	Chip Ganassi Racing	Chevrolet	65	25
15	9	21	Matt DiBenedetto	Wood Brothers Racing	Ford	65	28
16	25	47	Ricky Stenhouse Jr.	JTG Daugherty Racing	Chevrolet	65	27
17	1	4	Kevin Harvick	Stewart-Haas Racing	Ford	65	23
18	18	8	Tyler Reddick (R)	Richard Childress Racing	Chevrolet	65	19
19	14	6	Ryan Newman	Roush Fenway Racing	Ford	65	18
20	23	13	Ty Dillon	Germain Racing	Chevrolet	65	17
21	15	95	Christopher Bell (R)	Leavine Family Racing	Toyota	65	16
22	26	41	Cole Custer (R)	Stewart-Haas Racing	Ford	65	17
23	22	37	Ryan Preece	JTG Daugherty Racing	Chevrolet	65	20
24	6	10	Aric Almirola	Stewart-Haas Racing	Ford	65	13
25	19	43	Bubba Wallace	Richard Petty Motorsports	Chevrolet	65	12
26	16	42	Matt Kenseth	Chip Ganassi Racing	Chevrolet	65	11
27	31	96	Daniel Suárez	Gaunt Brothers Racing	Toyota	65	10
28	33	15	Brennan Poole (R)	Premium Motorsports	Chevrolet	65	9
29	37	66	Timmy Hill (i)	MBM Motorsports	Toyota	65	0
30	38	51	James Davison	Petty Ware Racing	Chevrolet	65	7
31	24	12	Ryan Blaney	Team Penske	Ford	65	14
32	29	32	Corey LaJoie	Go Fas Racing	Ford	65	6
33	35	00	Quin Houff (R)	StarCom Racing	Chevrolet	64	4
34	32	27	J. J. Yeley (i) (Note: Bayley Currey took over the car before the end of the second stage after Yeley suffered from heat exhaustion when the car's cooling system failed.)	Rick Ware Racing	Ford	64	0
35	28	38	John Hunter Nemechek (R)	Front Row Motorsports	Ford	62	2
36	36	53	Garrett Smithley (i)	Rick Ware Racing	Ford	60	0
37	4	18	Kyle Busch	Joe Gibbs Racing	Toyota	53	1
38	34	77	Stanton Barrett	Spire Motorsports	Chevrolet	49	1
39	39	62	Brendan Gaughan	Beard Motorsports	Chevrolet	46	1
Official race results

=== Race statistics ===
- Lead changes: 13 among 6 different drivers
- Cautions/Laps: 4 for 7 laps
- Red flags: 1 for 31 minutes and 14 seconds (lightning policy)
- Time of race: 2 hours, 37 minutes and 30 seconds
- Average speed: 89.39 miles per hour (143.86 km/h)

== Media ==
=== Television ===
NBC Sports covered the race on the television side. Rick Allen, Jeff Burton, Steve Letarte and four-time Daytona winner Dale Earnhardt Jr. covered the race from the booth at Charlotte Motor Speedway. Dave Burns, Parker Kligerman and Dillon Welch handled the pit road duties on site, and Rutledge Wood handled the features from his home during the race.

NBC
Booth announcers	Pit reporters	Features reporter
Lap-by-lap: Rick Allen; Color-commentator: Jeff Burton; Color-commentator: Steve Letarte; Color-commentator: Dale Earnhardt Jr.	Dave Burns; Parker Kligerman; Dillon Welch	Rutledge Wood

=== Radio ===
MRN had the radio call for the race, which was also simulcast on Sirius XM NASCAR Radio.

MRN Radio
Booth announcers	Turn announcers	Pit reporters
Lead announcer: Alex Hayden; Announcer: Jeff Striegle; Announcer: Rusty Wallace	Road Course Infield: Dave Moody; NASCAR 1/2: Mike Bagley; LM Chicane-NASCAR 3/4: Kurt Becker	Winston Kelley; Steve Post

== Standings after the race ==
Drivers' Championship standings

	Pos	Driver	Points
	1	Kevin Harvick	939
1	2	Denny Hamlin	821 (–118)
1	3	Brad Keselowski	803 (–136)
1	4	Chase Elliott	775 (–164)
1	5	Ryan Blaney	755 (–184)
	6	Joey Logano	754 (–185)
	7	Martin Truex Jr.	753 (–186)
	8	Aric Almirola	682 (–257)
1	9	Kurt Busch	673 (–266)
1	10	Kyle Busch	652 (–287)
1	11	Clint Bowyer	618 (–321)
1	12	Alex Bowman	610 (–329)
	13	Matt DiBenedetto	596 (–343)
	14	William Byron	577 (–362)
1	15	Jimmie Johnson	552 (–387)
1	16	Erik Jones	542 (–397)
Official driver's standings

Manufacturers' Championship standings

Pos	Manufacturer	Points
1	Ford	860
2	Toyota	805 (–55)
3	Chevrolet	765 (–95)

- Note: Only the first 16 positions are included for the driver standings.
- . – Driver has clinched a position in the NASCAR Cup Series playoffs.

Previous race: 2020 Consumers Energy 400	NASCAR Cup Series; 2020 season	Next race: 2020 Drydene 311
