= 2019 Toyota Owners 400 =

Ninth race of the 2019 Monster Energy Cup Series

Race details
- Race 9 of 36 in the 2019 Monster Energy NASCAR Cup Series
- Date: April 13, 2019
- Location: Richmond Raceway in Richmond, Virginia
- Course: Permanent racing facility
- Course length: 0.75 miles (1.2 km)
- Distance: 400 laps, 300 mi (480 km)
- Average speed: 99.852 miles per hour (160.696 km/h)

Pole position
Driver	Kevin Harvick	Stewart-Haas Racing
- Time: 21.722

Most laps led
Driver	Martin Truex Jr.	Joe Gibbs Racing
- Laps: 186

Winner
No. 19	Martin Truex Jr.	Joe Gibbs Racing

Television in the United States
- Network: Fox
- Announcers: Mike Joy, Jeff Gordon and Darrell Waltrip
- Nielsen ratings: 2.787 million

Radio in the United States
- Radio: MRN
- Booth announcers: Alex Hayden, Jeff Striegle, and Rusty Wallace
- Turn announcers: Mike Bagley (Backstretch)

The 2019 Toyota Owners 400 is a Monster Energy NASCAR Cup Series race held on April 13, 2019, at Richmond Raceway in Richmond, Virginia. Contested over 400 laps on the 0.75 mile (1.2 km) asphalt short track, it was the ninth race of the 2019 Monster Energy NASCAR Cup Series season.

== Report ==
=== Background ===
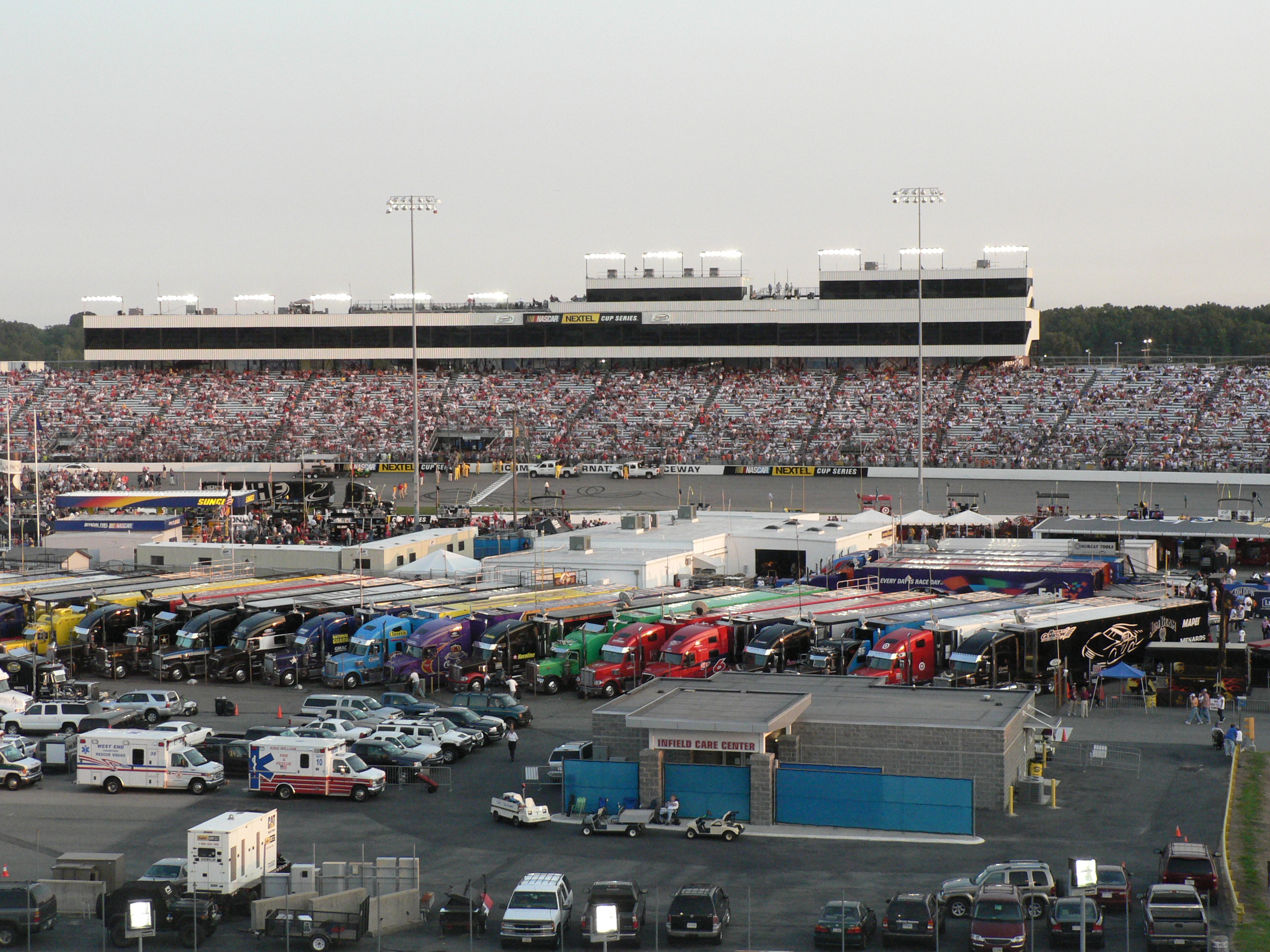
Richmond Raceway, the track where the race was held.

Richmond Raceway is a 3/4-mile (1.2 km), D-shaped, asphalt race track located just outside Richmond, Virginia in Henrico County. It hosts the Monster Energy NASCAR Cup Series and Xfinity Series. Known as "America's premier short track", it hostes the NASCAR Camping World Truck Series, formerly hosted an IndyCar Series race, and two USAC sprint car races.

==== Entry list ====
No.	Driver	Team	Manufacturer
00	Landon Cassill	StarCom Racing	Chevrolet
1	Kurt Busch	Chip Ganassi Racing	Chevrolet
2	Brad Keselowski	Team Penske	Ford
3	Austin Dillon	Richard Childress Racing	Chevrolet
4	Kevin Harvick	Stewart-Haas Racing	Ford
6	Ryan Newman	Roush Fenway Racing	Ford
8	Daniel Hemric (R)	Richard Childress Racing	Chevrolet
9	Chase Elliott	Hendrick Motorsports	Chevrolet
10	Aric Almirola	Stewart-Haas Racing	Ford
11	Denny Hamlin	Joe Gibbs Racing	Toyota
12	Ryan Blaney	Team Penske	Ford
13	Ty Dillon	Germain Racing	Chevrolet
14	Clint Bowyer	Stewart-Haas Racing	Ford
15	Ross Chastain (i)	Premium Motorsports	Chevrolet
17	Ricky Stenhouse Jr.	Roush Fenway Racing	Ford
18	Kyle Busch	Joe Gibbs Racing	Toyota
19	Martin Truex Jr.	Joe Gibbs Racing	Toyota
20	Erik Jones	Joe Gibbs Racing	Toyota
21	Paul Menard	Wood Brothers Racing	Ford
22	Joey Logano	Team Penske	Ford
24	William Byron	Hendrick Motorsports	Chevrolet
32	Corey LaJoie	Go Fas Racing	Ford
34	Michael McDowell	Front Row Motorsports	Ford
36	Matt Tifft (R)	Front Row Motorsports	Ford
37	Chris Buescher	JTG Daugherty Racing	Chevrolet
38	David Ragan	Front Row Motorsports	Ford
41	Daniel Suárez	Stewart-Haas Racing	Ford
42	Kyle Larson	Chip Ganassi Racing	Chevrolet
43	Bubba Wallace	Richard Petty Motorsports	Chevrolet
47	Ryan Preece (R)	JTG Daugherty Racing	Chevrolet
48	Jimmie Johnson	Hendrick Motorsports	Chevrolet
51	Jeb Burton (i)	Petty Ware Racing	Ford
52	Bayley Currey (i)	Rick Ware Racing	Chevrolet
66	Joey Gase (i)	MBM Motorsports	Toyota
77	Quin Houff	Spire Motorsports	Chevrolet
88	Alex Bowman	Hendrick Motorsports	Chevrolet
95	Matt DiBenedetto	Leavine Family Racing	Toyota
Official entry list

== Practice ==
=== First practice ===
Kyle Larson was the fastest in the first practice session with a time of 22.185 seconds and a speed of 121.704 mph (195.864 km/h).

Pos	No.	Driver	Team	Manufacturer	Time	Speed
1	42	Kyle Larson	Chip Ganassi Racing	Chevrolet	22.185	121.704
2	11	Denny Hamlin	Joe Gibbs Racing	Toyota	22.189	121.682
3	37	Chris Buescher	JTG Daugherty Racing	Chevrolet	22.197	121.638
Official first practice results

=== Final practice ===
Final practice session scheduled for Friday was cancelled due to rain.

== Qualifying ==
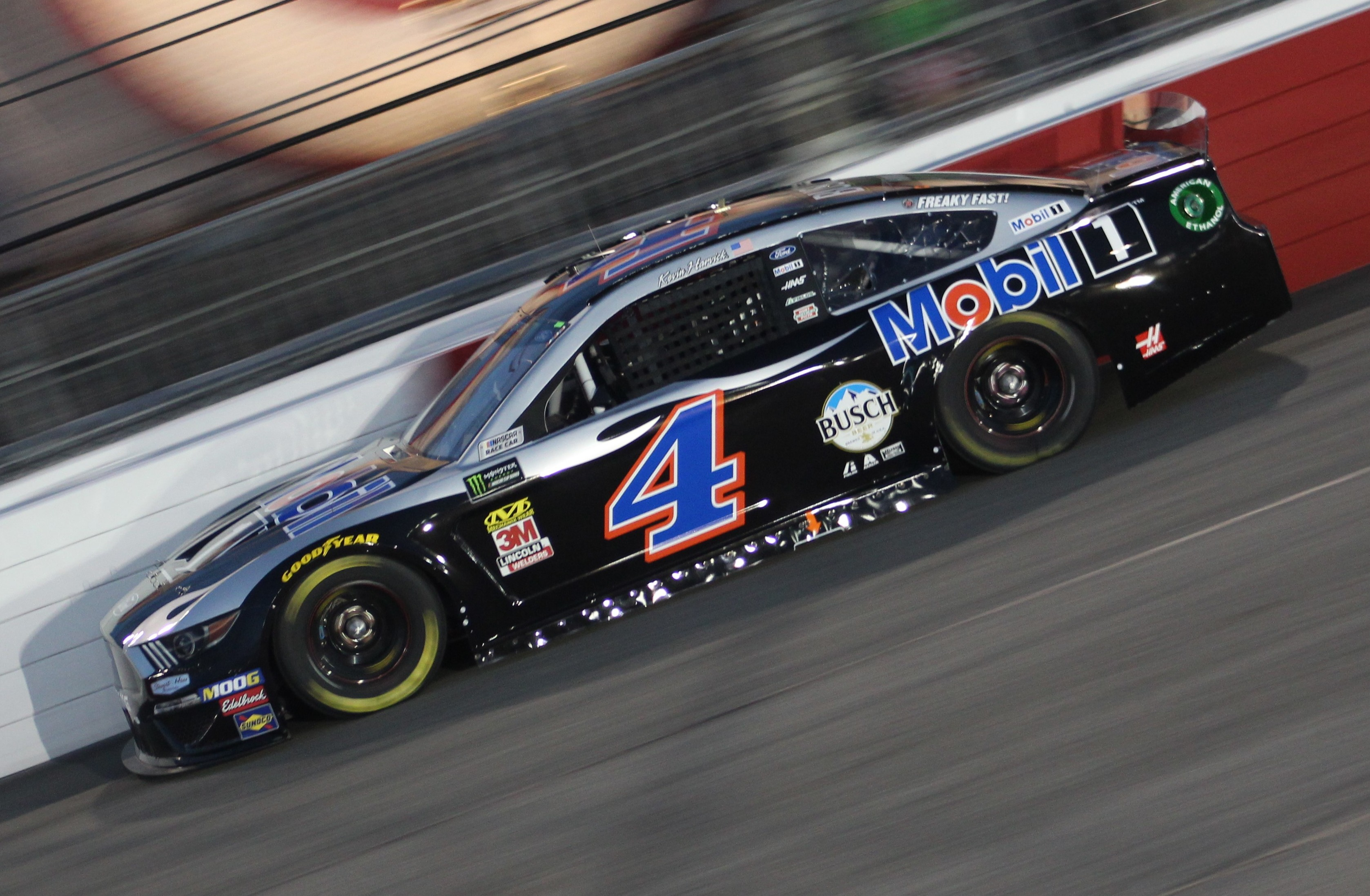
Kevin Harvick started from pole position.

Kevin Harvick scored the pole for the race with a time of 21.722 and a speed of 124.298 mph (200.038 km/h).

=== Qualifying results ===
Pos	No.	Driver	Team	Manufacturer	R1	R2	R3
1	4	Kevin Harvick	Stewart-Haas Racing	Ford	21.579	21.698	21.722
2	20	Erik Jones	Joe Gibbs Racing	Toyota	21.588	21.703	21.760
3	1	Kurt Busch	Chip Ganassi Racing	Chevrolet	21.460	21.782	21.797
4	22	Joey Logano	Team Penske	Ford	21.699	21.777	21.832
5	18	Kyle Busch	Joe Gibbs Racing	Toyota	21.735	21.640	21.845
6	19	Martin Truex Jr.	Joe Gibbs Racing	Toyota	21.649	21.725	21.880
7	9	Chase Elliott	Hendrick Motorsports	Chevrolet	21.662	21.785	21.924
8	3	Austin Dillon	Richard Childress Racing	Chevrolet	21.573	21.730	21.958
9	41	Daniel Suárez	Stewart-Haas Racing	Ford	21.645	21.834	22.021
10	48	Jimmie Johnson	Hendrick Motorsports	Chevrolet	21.698	21.841	22.101
11	37	Chris Buescher	JTG Daugherty Racing	Chevrolet	21.718	21.794	22.106
12	2	Brad Keselowski	Team Penske	Ford	21.789	21.763	22.120
13	21	Paul Menard	Wood Brothers Racing	Ford	21.760	21.848	—
14	42	Kyle Larson	Chip Ganassi Racing	Chevrolet	21.511	21.855	—
15	10	Aric Almirola	Stewart-Haas Racing	Ford	21.766	21.865	—
16	17	Ricky Stenhouse Jr.	Roush Fenway Racing	Ford	21.539	21.871	—
17	88	Alex Bowman	Hendrick Motorsports	Chevrolet	21.705	21.891	—
18	11	Denny Hamlin	Joe Gibbs Racing	Toyota	21.571	21.898	—
19	24	William Byron	Hendrick Motorsports	Chevrolet	21.730	21.899	—
20	36	Matt Tifft (R)	Front Row Motorsports	Ford	21.755	21.900	—
21	14	Clint Bowyer	Stewart-Haas Racing	Ford	21.594	21.925	—
22	38	David Ragan	Front Row Motorsports	Ford	21.678	21.934	—
23	47	Ryan Preece (R)	JTG Daugherty Racing	Chevrolet	21.770	21.951	—
24	8	Daniel Hemric (R)	Richard Childress Racing	Chevrolet	21.796	22.099	—
25	34	Michael McDowell	Front Row Motorsports	Ford	21.802	—	—
26	43	Bubba Wallace	Richard Petty Motorsports	Chevrolet	21.821	—	—
27	95	Matt DiBenedetto	Leavine Family Racing	Toyota	21.823	—	—
28	32	Corey LaJoie	Go Fas Racing	Ford	21.843	—	—
29	12	Ryan Blaney	Team Penske	Ford	21.849	—	—
30	13	Ty Dillon	Germain Racing	Chevrolet	21.873	—	—
31	6	Ryan Newman	Roush Fenway Racing	Ford	21.898	—	—
32	00	Landon Cassill	StarCom Racing	Chevrolet	21.920	—	—
33	52	Bayley Currey (i)	Rick Ware Racing	Chevrolet	22.046	—	—
34	51	Jeb Burton (i)	Petty Ware Racing	Ford	22.211	—	—
35	77	Quin Houff	Spire Motorsports	Chevrolet	22.384	—	—
36	66	Joey Gase (i)	MBM Motorsports	Toyota	22.652	—	—
37	15	Ross Chastain (i)	Premium Motorsports	Chevrolet	0.000	—	—
Official qualifying results

- Note: Erik Jones, Chase Elliott, Daniel Suarez, Jimmie Johnson, Aric Almirola, Denny Hamlin, Matt Tifft, and Joey Gase all had their times disallowed and started at the rear of the field due to failing inspection and started based on owner points.

== Race ==
=== Stage Results ===
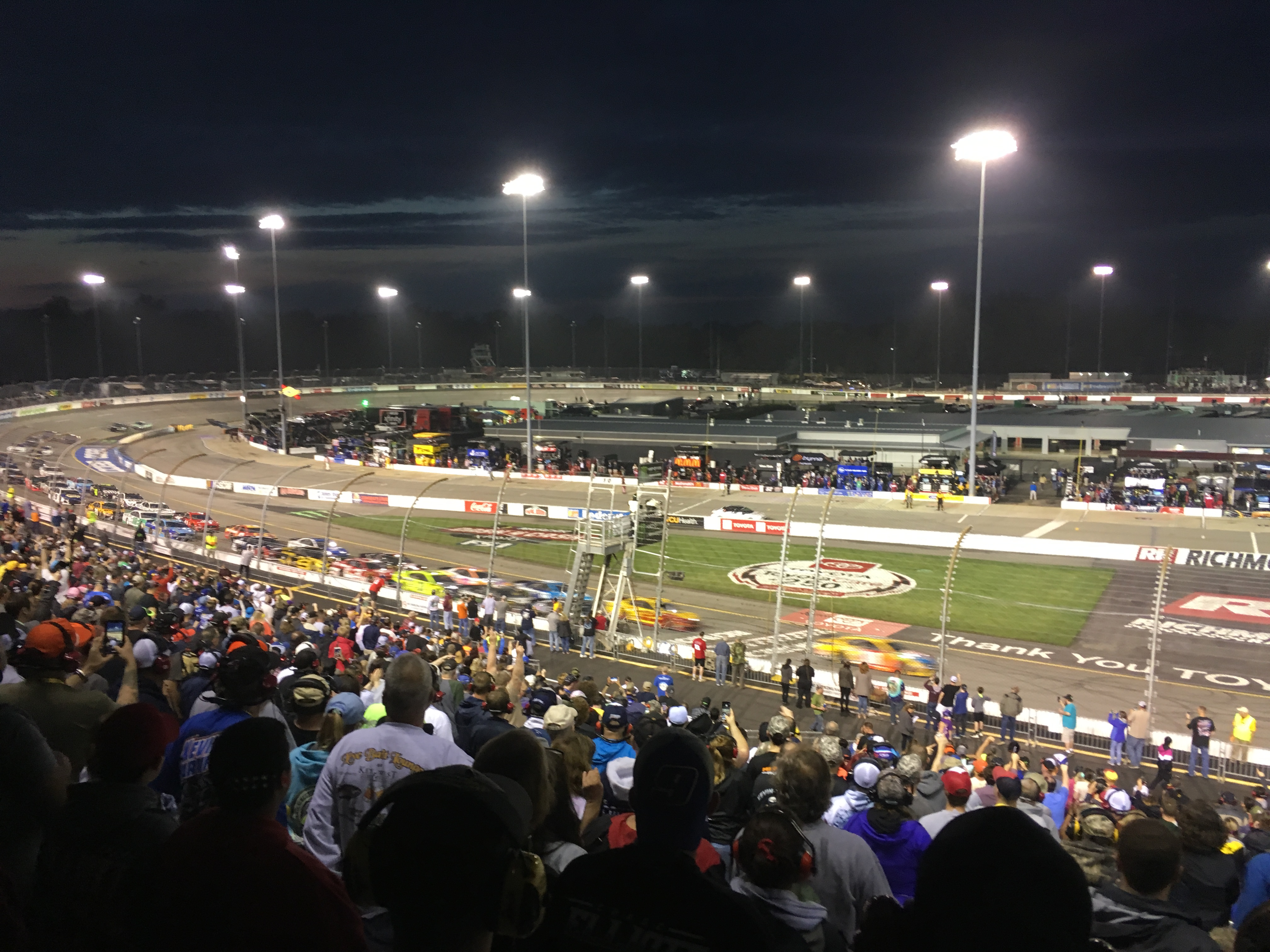
Kyle Busch leads during the first stage of the race

Stage One Laps: 100

Pos	No	Driver	Team	Manufacturer	Points
1	18	Kyle Busch	Joe Gibbs Racing	Toyota	10
2	22	Joey Logano	Team Penske	Ford	9
3	19	Martin Truex Jr.	Joe Gibbs Racing	Toyota	8
4	4	Kevin Harvick	Stewart-Haas Racing	Ford	7
5	14	Clint Bowyer	Stewart-Haas Racing	Ford	6
6	2	Brad Keselowski	Team Penske	Ford	5
7	1	Kurt Busch	Chip Ganassi Racing	Chevrolet	4
8	37	Chris Buescher	JTG Daugherty Racing	Chevrolet	3
9	21	Paul Menard	Wood Brothers Racing	Ford	2
10	41	Daniel Suárez	Stewart-Haas Racing	Ford	1
Official stage one results

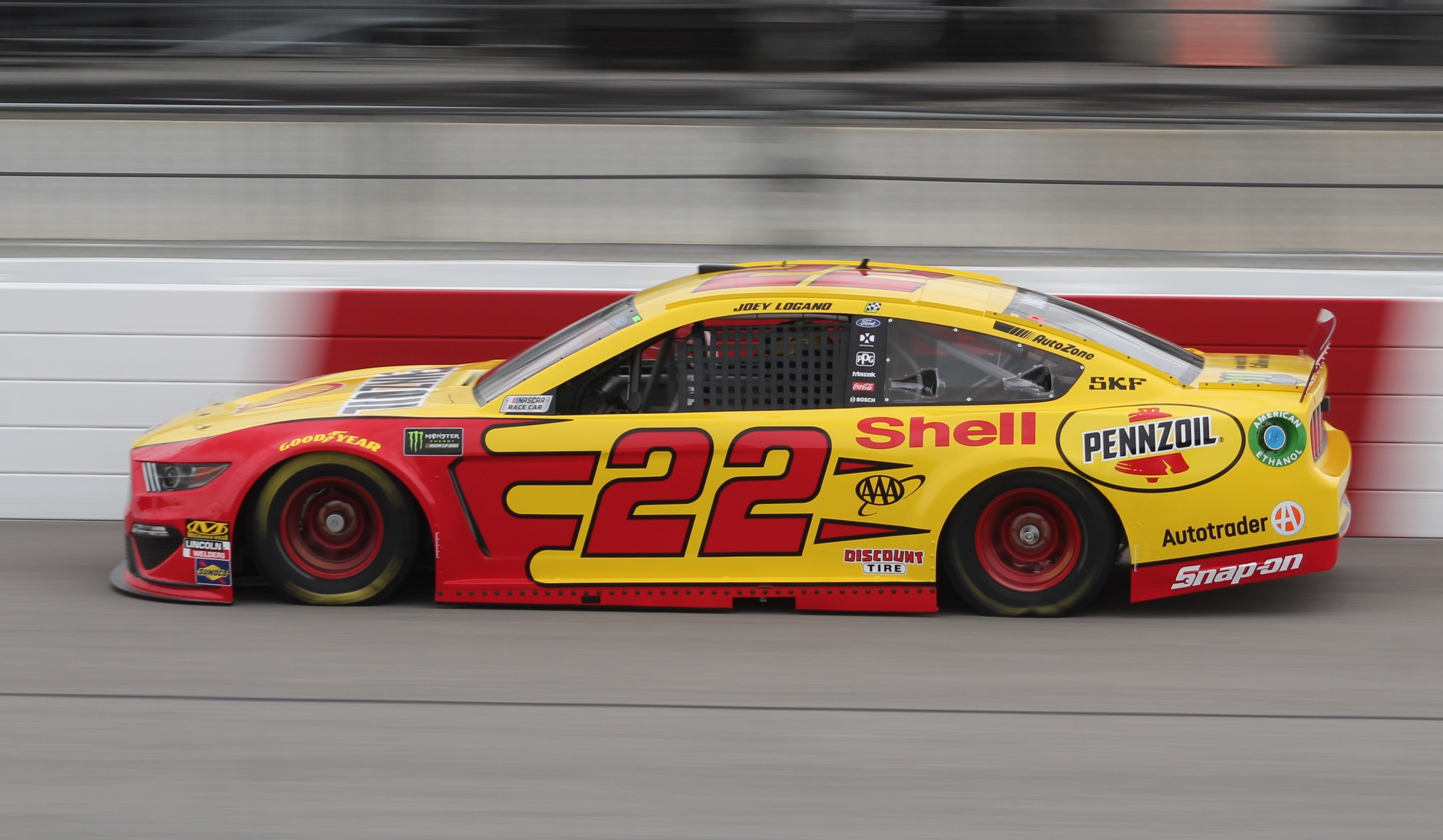
Joey Logano won the second stage.

Stage Two Laps: 100

Pos	No	Driver	Team	Manufacturer	Points
1	22	Joey Logano	Team Penske	Ford	10
2	19	Martin Truex Jr.	Joe Gibbs Racing	Toyota	9
3	4	Kevin Harvick	Stewart-Haas Racing	Ford	8
4	2	Brad Keselowski	Team Penske	Ford	7
5	14	Clint Bowyer	Stewart-Haas Racing	Ford	6
6	41	Daniel Suárez	Stewart-Haas Racing	Ford	5
7	1	Kurt Busch	Chip Ganassi Racing	Chevrolet	4
8	20	Erik Jones	Joe Gibbs Racing	Toyota	3
9	37	Chris Buescher	JTG Daugherty Racing	Chevrolet	2
10	21	Paul Menard	Wood Brothers Racing	Ford	1
Official stage two results

=== Final Stage Results ===
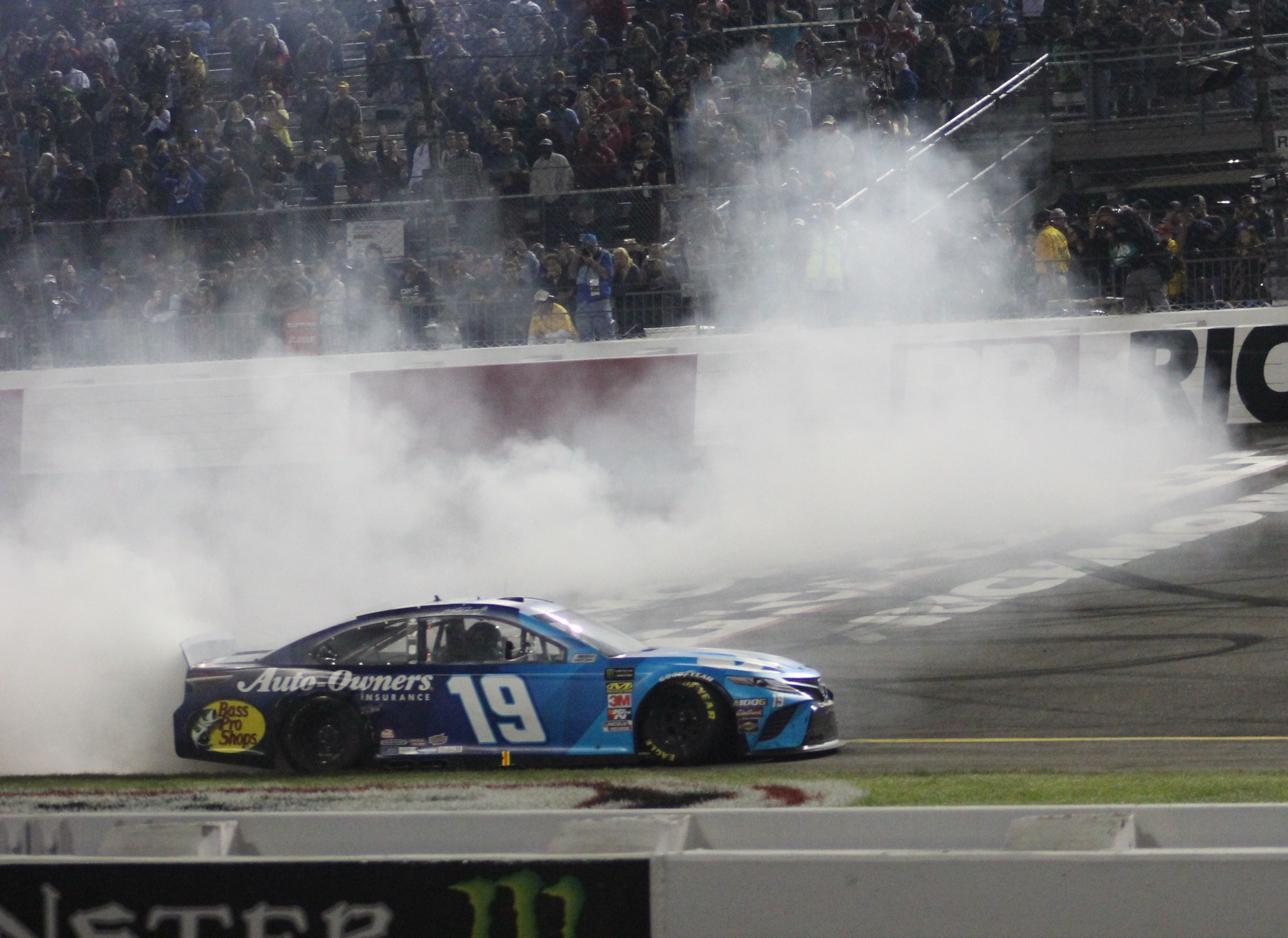
Martin Truex Jr. celebrating victory lap.

Stage Three Laps: 200

Pos	Grid	No	Driver	Team	Manufacturer	Laps	Points
1	5	19	Martin Truex Jr.	Joe Gibbs Racing	Toyota	400	57
2	3	22	Joey Logano	Team Penske	Ford	400	54
3	14	14	Clint Bowyer	Stewart-Haas Racing	Ford	400	46
4	1	4	Kevin Harvick	Stewart-Haas Racing	Ford	400	48
5	30	11	Denny Hamlin	Joe Gibbs Racing	Toyota	400	32
6	6	3	Austin Dillon	Richard Childress Racing	Chevrolet	400	31
7	8	2	Brad Keselowski	Team Penske	Ford	400	42
8	4	18	Kyle Busch	Joe Gibbs Racing	Toyota	400	39
9	24	6	Ryan Newman	Roush Fenway Racing	Ford	400	28
10	9	21	Paul Menard	Wood Brothers Racing	Ford	400	30
11	2	1	Kurt Busch	Chip Ganassi Racing	Chevrolet	400	34
12	34	48	Jimmie Johnson	Hendrick Motorsports	Chevrolet	400	25
13	13	24	William Byron	Hendrick Motorsports	Chevrolet	400	24
14	35	20	Erik Jones	Joe Gibbs Racing	Toyota	400	26
15	32	9	Chase Elliott	Hendrick Motorsports	Chevrolet	400	22
16	11	17	Ricky Stenhouse Jr.	Roush Fenway Racing	Ford	400	21
17	12	88	Alex Bowman	Hendrick Motorsports	Chevrolet	399	20
18	33	41	Daniel Suárez	Stewart-Haas Racing	Ford	399	25
19	17	8	Daniel Hemric (R)	Richard Childress Racing	Chevrolet	399	18
20	16	47	Ryan Preece (R)	JTG Daugherty Racing	Chevrolet	399	17
21	23	13	Ty Dillon	Germain Racing	Chevrolet	398	16
22	7	37	Chris Buescher	JTG Daugherty Racing	Chevrolet	398	20
23	31	10	Aric Almirola	Stewart-Haas Racing	Ford	398	14
24	20	95	Matt DiBenedetto	Leavine Family Racing	Toyota	398	13
25	22	12	Ryan Blaney	Team Penske	Ford	398	12
26	21	32	Corey LaJoie	Go Fas Racing	Ford	396	11
27	19	43	Bubba Wallace	Richard Petty Motorsports	Chevrolet	396	10
28	15	38	David Ragan	Front Row Motorsports	Ford	396	9
29	36	36	Matt Tifft (R)	Front Row Motorsports	Ford	395	8
30	29	15	Ross Chastain (i)	Premium Motorsports	Chevrolet	394	0
31	27	51	Jeb Burton (i)	Petty Ware Racing	Ford	392	0
32	26	52	Bayley Currey (i)	Rick Ware Racing	Chevrolet	392	0
33	37	66	Joey Gase (i)	MBM Motorsports	Toyota	387	0
34	28	77	Quin Houff	Spire Motorsports	Chevrolet	386	3
35	25	00	Landon Cassill	StarCom Racing	Chevrolet	322	2
36	18	34	Michael McDowell	Front Row Motorsports	Ford	240	1
37	10	42	Kyle Larson	Chip Ganassi Racing	Chevrolet	125	1
Official race results

=== Race statistics ===
- Lead changes: 8 among 5 different drivers
- Cautions/Laps: 5 for 41
- Red flags: 0
- Time of race: 3 hours, 0 minutes and 16 seconds
- Average speed: 99.852 miles per hour (160.696 km/h)

== Media ==
=== Television ===
Fox Sports covered their 19th race at the Richmond Raceway. Mike Joy, two-time Richmond winner Jeff Gordon and six-time Richmond winner Darrell Waltrip had the call in the booth for the race. Jamie Little, Vince Welch and Matt Yocum handled the pit road duties for the television side.

Fox
Booth announcers	Pit reporters
Lap-by-lap: Mike Joy; Color-commentator: Jeff Gordon; Color commentator: Darrell Waltrip	Jamie Little; Vince Welch; Matt Yocum

=== Radio ===
MRN had the radio call for the race which was also simulcast on Sirius XM NASCAR Radio. Alex Hayden, Jeff Striegle and six-time Richmond winner Rusty Wallace called the race in the booth when the field raced down the frontstretch. Mike Bagley called the race from a platform inside the backstretch when the field raced down the backstretch. Winston Kelley, Steve Post and Glenn Jarrett worked pit road for the radio side.

MRN
Booth announcers	Turn announcers	Pit reporters
Lead announcer: Alex Hayden; Announcer: Jeff Striegle; Announcer: Rusty Wallace	Backstretch: Mike Bagley	Winston Kelley; Steve Post; Dillon Welch

== Standings after the race ==
Drivers' Championship standings

	Pos	Driver	Points
	1	Kyle Busch	400
1	2	Joey Logano	380 (–20)
1	3	Denny Hamlin	366 (–36)
	4	Kevin Harvick	349 (–51)
	5	Brad Keselowski	313 (–87)
1	6	Martin Truex Jr.	311 (–89)
1	7	Kurt Busch	287 (–113)
3	8	Clint Bowyer	280 (–120)
3	9	Ryan Blaney	277 (–123)
	10	Chase Elliott	267 (–133)
2	11	Aric Almirola	260 (–140)
	12	Daniel Suárez	235 (–165)
	13	Jimmie Johnson	234 (–166)
4	14	Austin Dillon	216 (–184)
	15	Ryan Newman	216 (–184)
3	16	Paul Menard	213 (–187)
Official driver's standings

Manufacturers' Championship standings

Pos	Manufacturer	Points
1	Toyota	343
2	Ford	326 (–17)
3	Chevrolet	292 (–51)

- Note: Only the first 16 positions are included for the driver standings.
- . – Driver has clinched a position in the Monster Energy NASCAR Cup Series playoffs.

Previous race: 2019 Food City 500	Monster Energy NASCAR Cup Series; 2019 season	Next race: 2019 GEICO 500
