= MB2 Motorsports =

Former NASCAR team

- Owners: Nelson Bowers; Tom Beard; Read Morton; James Rocco (MBV); Bob Sutton (MB Sutton; Jay Frye (CEO and Team Director; Bobby Ginn; Thomas Ginn (Ginn Racing)
- Base: Mooresville, North Carolina
- Series: NASCAR Cup Series; Xfinity Series
- Manufacturer: Chevrolet; Pontiac
- Opened: 1997 (as MB2 Motorsports); 2007 (as Ginn Racing)
- Closed: 2007 (as Ginn Racing; merged with DEI)

Career
- Drivers' Championships: 0
- Race victories: 2

The logo of Ginn Racing under Bobby Ginn ownership

MB2 Motorsports was a NASCAR Cup Series team based in Mooresville, North Carolina, near the sport's hub in Charlotte. The team was founded by Read Morton, Tom Beard, and Nelson Bowers, from which the original team name derived. Bowers was the longest tenured of the original owners, and the listed owner of the teams' entries when resort and real-estate developer Bobby Ginn bought out the team (with his family having 80% ownership; longtime team director Jay Frye owned the remaining 20% of the rebranded team) in 2007, renaming it to Ginn Racing for that season only. The Valvoline corporation co-owned the No. 10 (later the No. 14) car with the principal owners from 2001 to 2005 as MBV Motorsports, while the No. 36 entry (later the No. 13) was co-owned by Centrix Financial, LLC owner Robert Sutton as MB Sutton Motorsports in 2005.

Throughout the existence of the team in both MB2 Motorsports and Ginn Racing iterations, the organization ran General Motors brands.

== NASCAR Cup Series ==
=== Car No. 01 history ===
Derrike Cope (1997)

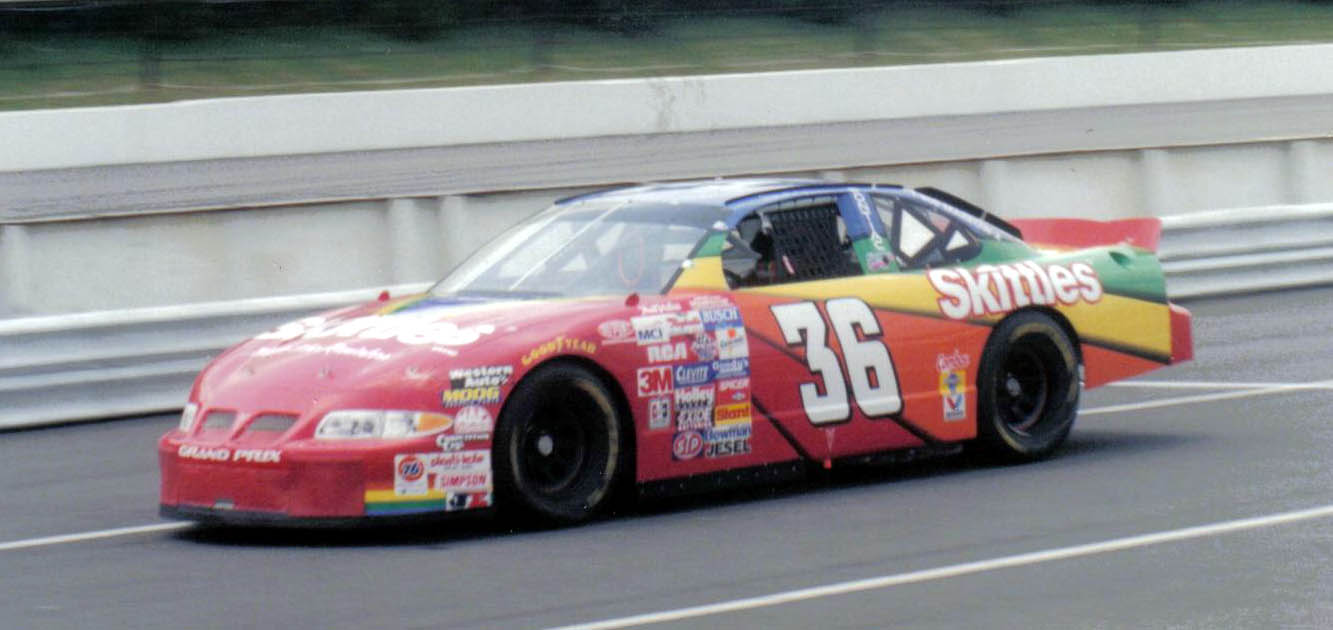
Derrike Cope in the original MB2 car in 1997.

The No. 01 car started out as the No. 36 Pontiac in 1997 with sponsorship from M&M-Mars through its Skittles candy brand, and driver Derrike Cope. Cope finished 27th in the final point standings.

Ernie Irvan (1998–1999)

Veteran driver Ernie Irvan took over from Cope in 1998. The season was highlighted by Irvan's pole win at the Brickyard 400. M&M's replaced Skittles as the team's sponsor in 1999. Irvan retired from racing in September following a crash at Michigan International Speedway. Dick Trickle temporarily replaced Irvan before the driving chores were permanently turned over to journeyman Jerry Nadeau.

Ken Schrader (2000–2002)

Nadeau left MB2 due to a prior commitment to drive for Hendrick Motorsports, and MB2 signed four-time winner Ken Schrader to fill the seat. Schrader drove the No. 36 for three seasons before leaving for BAM Racing.

Jerry Nadeau (2003)

In 2003, the United States Army replaced M&M's as the team's sponsor. The car number was switched from 36 to 01 to support the Army's slogan, "An Army of One." Nadeau returned to MB2 as the driver of the No. 01 car, and in his first 10 races with the team he had only two top-20 finishes, with a fourth-place finish at Texas.

On May 2, 2003, during practice at Richmond International Raceway, Nadeau lost control of the No. 01 while trying to avoid another car in turn one, spun and slammed driver-side first into the concrete wall. He suffered fractures to his skull and several ribs along with a collapsed lung and temporary paralysis on his left side, and the cumulative effects forced him into retirement at age 33. Busch Series veteran Jason Keller replaced Nadeau at the Richmond race and finished 32nd. The team went through several substitutes for the rest of the year. Mike Wallace ran the next four races, then four more races afterwards (skipping Sonoma) with a best finish of 19th at Dover. Mike Skinner, released from Morgan McClure Motorsports, made eleven starts in the #01, earning a pole at Richmond. Boris Said ran both road course races, with both a pole and sixth-place finish at Sonoma.

Said and Skinner earned spots in the 2004 Budweiser Shootout for their respective pole runs, with Said in the #01 finishing 10th, and Skinner finishing 15th in the #10 Valvoline car.

Joe Nemechek (2003–2006)

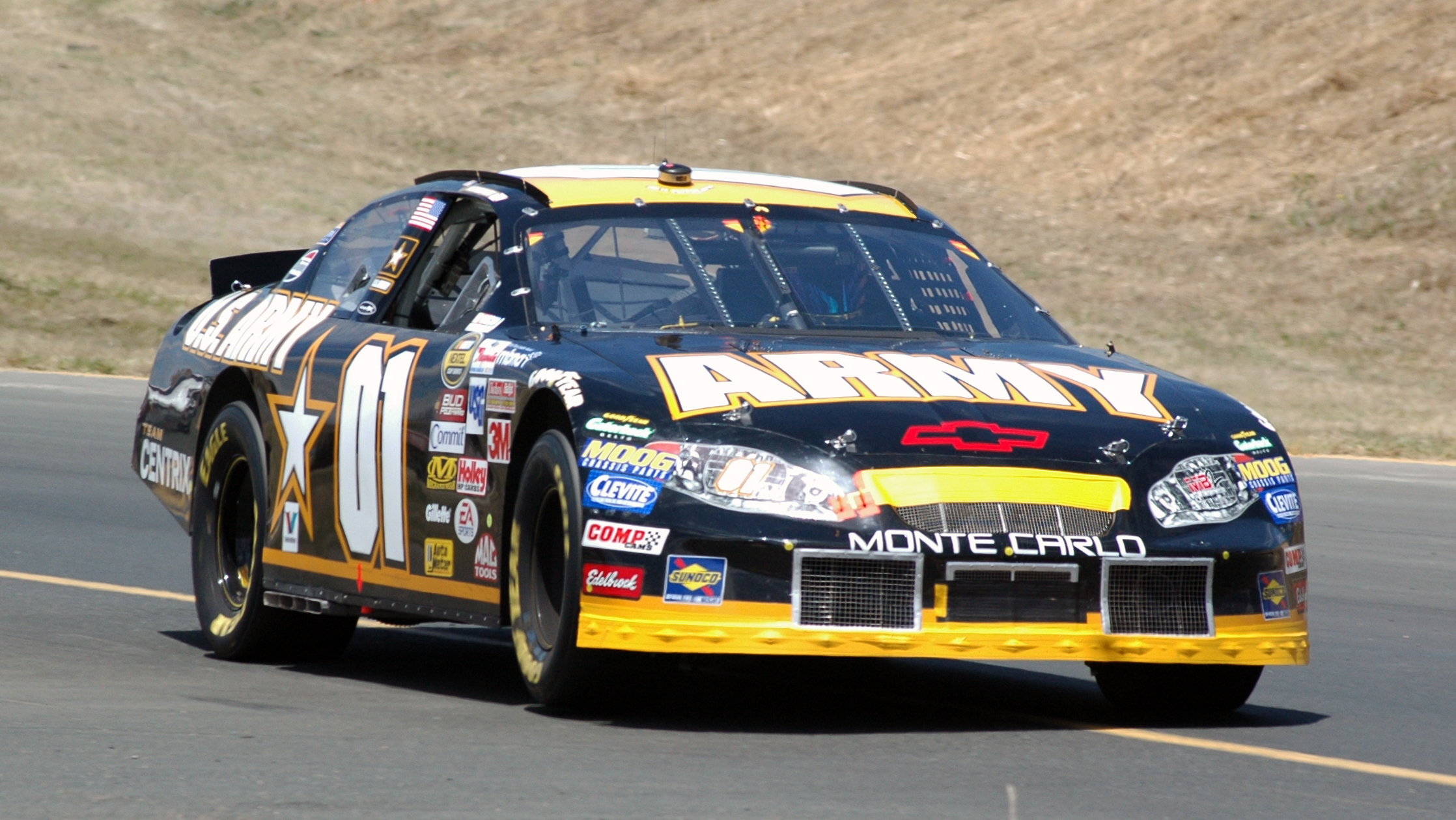
Joe Nemechek in 2005.

Joe Nemechek, who had been released from Hendrick Motorsports' No. 25 car (where he had replaced Nadeau), was signed by MB2 as the new permanent driver of the No. 01 car starting with the last four races of 2003, and earned a Top 10 finish at Atlanta. Nemechek finished 19th in points in 2004, but won two consecutive poles with the second leading to victory at the 2004 Banquet 400, in which he led the final 37 laps to win his fourth and final career Nextel Cup race and giving him a weekend sweep at Kansas Speedway, after having won the Mr. Goodcents 300 Busch Series race the day before. Nemechek finished with three Top 5 finishes and nine Top 10s, and signed a contract extension that kept him with MB2 through 2005.

Nemechek started off 2005 with a strong run at the second race of the season at Auto Club Speedway. Coming off a solid 13th-place finish at Daytona, Joe started 4th and led leading a race-high 63 laps before his Hendrick Motorsports-built engine expired on lap 178. This was one of six Hendrick engine failures, which included that of teammate Scott Riggs. By race 26 at Richmond, the No. 01 team found itself as a longshot of making the Chase, sitting 16th in the standings 135 points out of 10th place as the last mathematical contender for a spot in the 10-race playoff. The team's chase hunt was ultimately foiled when Travis Kvapil collided with Nemechek under caution right after he had gotten back on the lead lap, relegating them to a 26th-place finish. Overall, Nemechek improved on the previous years points performance, ranking 16th with one pole and nine Top 10s but no wins and only two Top 5s.

2006 was a struggle for Nemechek and the No. 01 team, with the team not scoring a Top 10 until finishing 9th at Charlotte in October, the 31st race of the season. Nemechek went winless again, with no pole starts, only two Top 10s, and a dismal 27th-place points finish.

Part-time Mark Martin (2007)

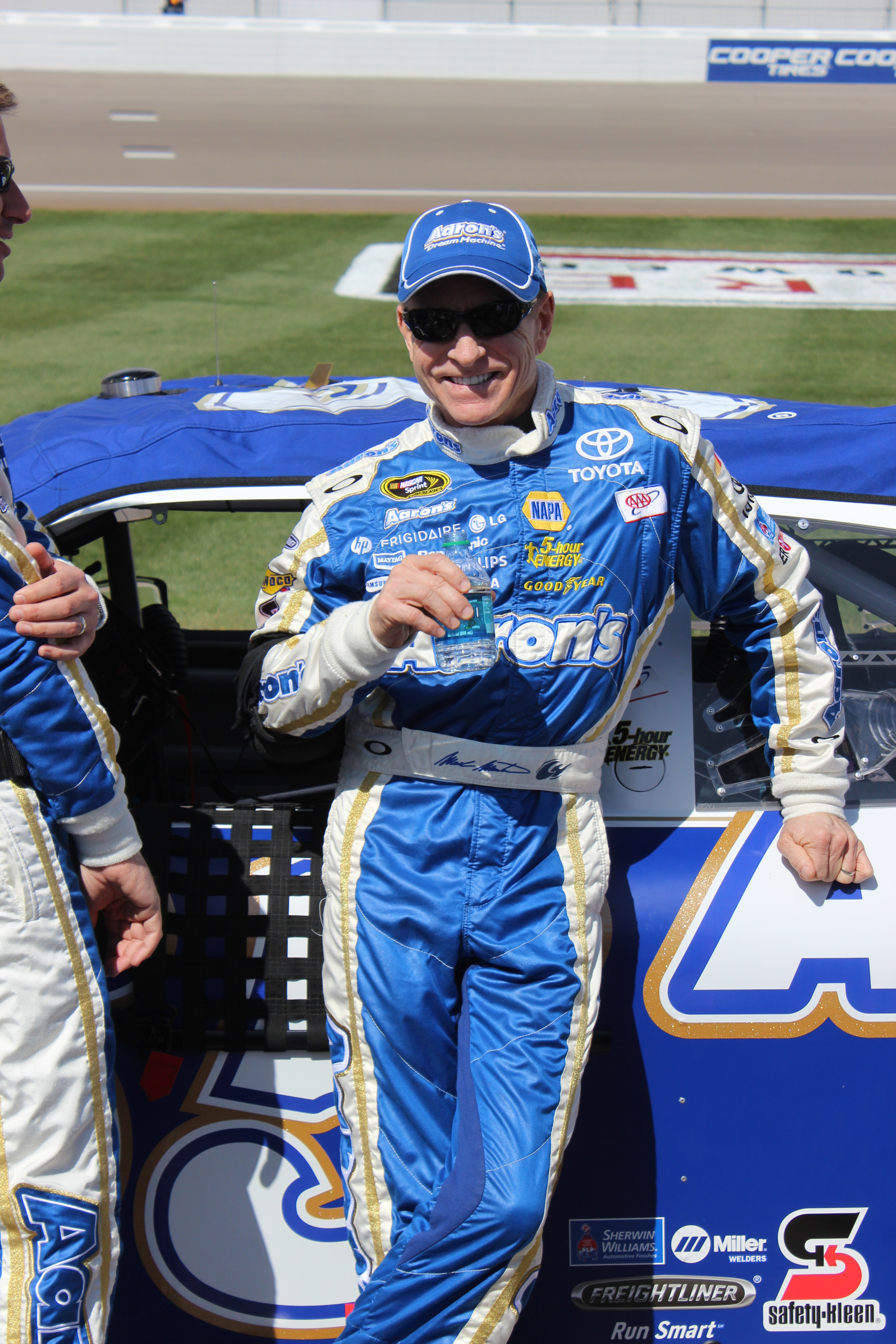
Mark Martin drove the 01 part-time in 2007, he would move to DEI's 8 car with Aric Almirola in 2008.

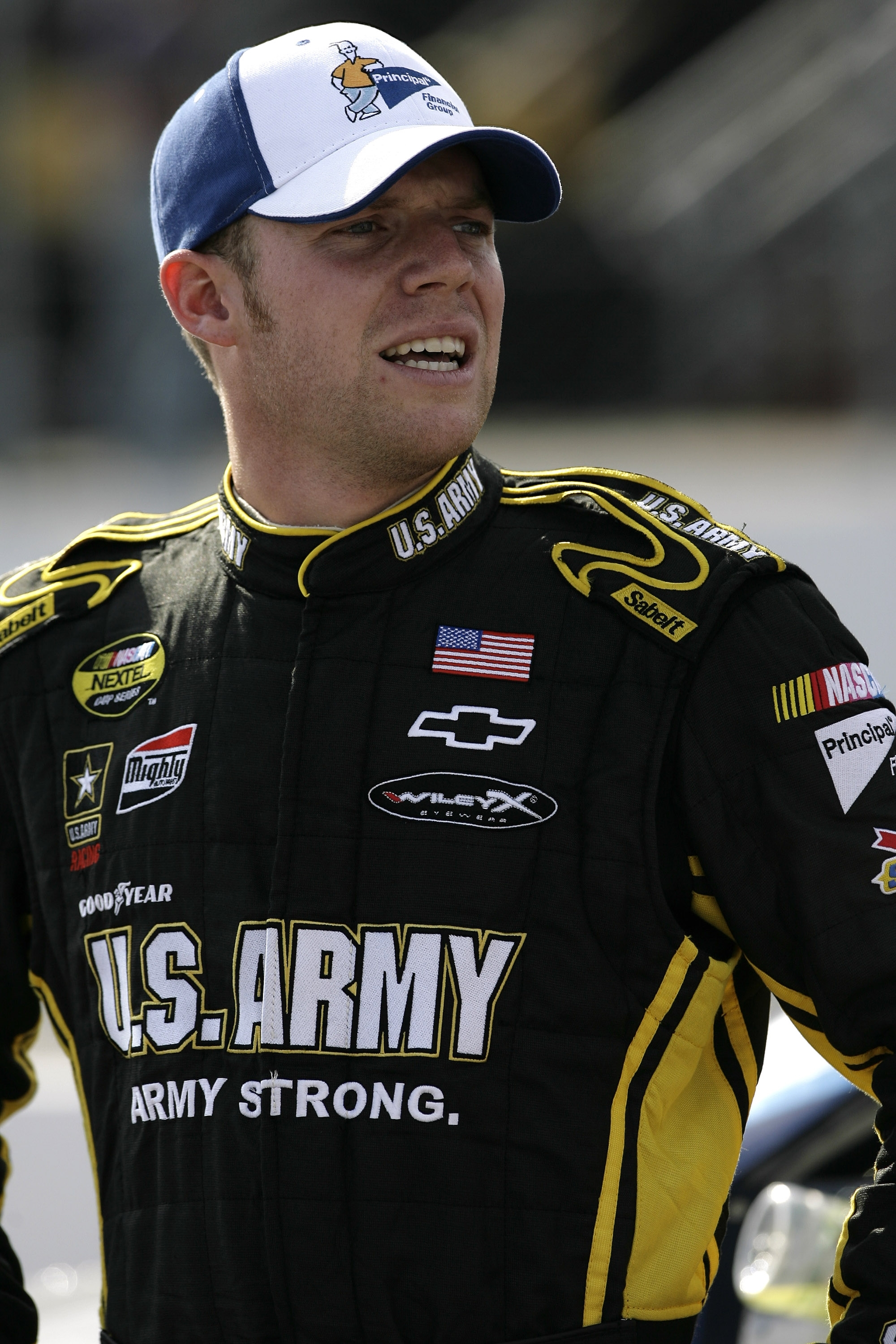
Regan Smith drove the 01 part-time in 2007, then drove the 01 for DEI in 34 of 36 races in 2008, winning Rookie of the Year.

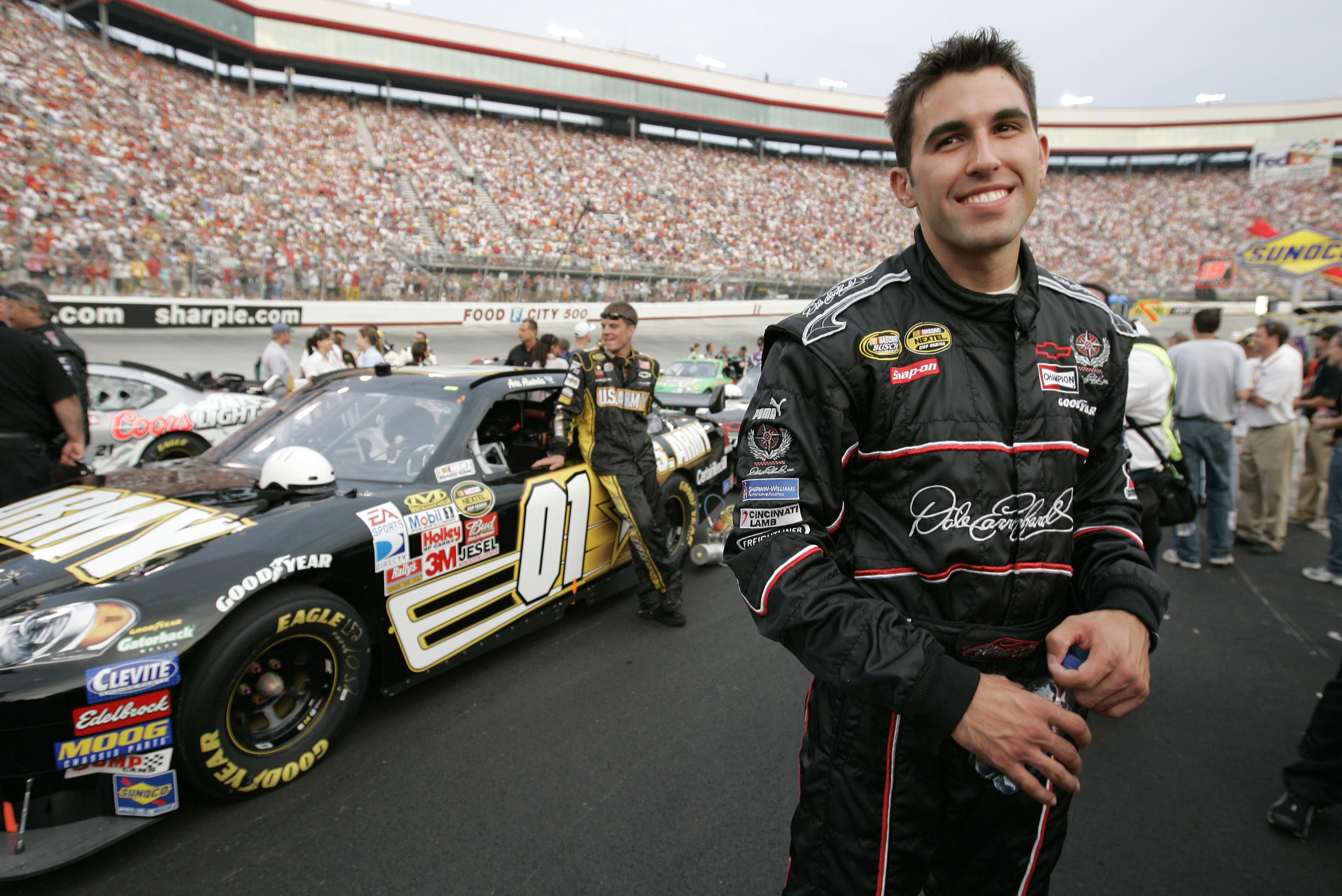
Aric Almirola in the 01 following the DEI takeover in 2007 sharing the car with Mark Martin and Regan Smith, he would move to DEI's 8 car with Mark Martin in 2008.

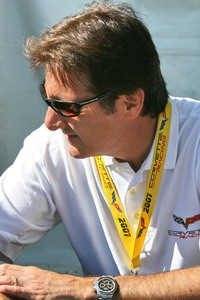
Ron Fellows drove the 01 for DEI in the road course races in 2008.

Veteran Mark Martin, coming off his final year with Roush Racing, was signed drive the car for 23 races (21 points races plus the Budweiser Shootout and Nextel All-Star Challenge) in 2007, with Joe Nemechek moving over to the team's new No. 13 team. Regan Smith was pinned to fill the remaining 16 races of the season, while driving in the Busch Series for the team as well. The team also changed its name to Ginn Racing to reflect Bobby Ginn's new majority interest in the team. Martin was leading in the final turn of the season-opening Daytona 500, after lining up on the final restart with former Roush teammates Greg Biffle and Matt Kenseth behind him. Coming down the front stretch, and with the field wrecking behind him, Martin looked to have finally come through at Daytona. But the caution was not called, and Kevin Harvick caught Martin on his outside, beating him to the line by two-hundredths of a second. Martin put together more strong finishes, and after the fourth race at Atlanta was leading the points standings in what was supposed to be his first season of semi-retirement. Resisting the chance to capture his first championship, Martin did step out of the car as scheduled, breaking a streak of 621 consecutive starts. In 24 starts for the team, Martin scored five Top 5s and 11 Top 10s, and finished 27th in points despite missing 12 races.

DEI Merger and Beyond (2007)

Rookie Regan Smith meanwhile made his debut at Bristol Motor Speedway in March, finishing 25th. Smith would run six more races in the car, with a best finish of 24th at Talladega Superspeedway. On July 17, it was announced that Smith would move to the No. 14 car on a full-time basis, replacing veteran Sterling Marlin. Meanwhile, 23-year-old Aric Almirola, who was granted his release from Joe Gibbs Racing after being pulled out of a car he qualified on the pole during a Busch Series race in favor of Denny Hamlin, signed on to be the new co-driver of the No. 01. With the merger of Ginn and Dale Earnhardt, Inc. not long afterwards, Smith was left on the sidelines while Almirola ran five races. Aric's results were not much better than Regan's, with a best finish of 26th at Phoenix. Both drivers would continue with DEI in 2008 running for ROTY, and both would become winners later in their Cup careers.

==== Car No. 01 and 36 results ====
Year	Driver	No.	Make	1	2	3	4	5	6	7	8	9	10	11	12	13	14	15	16	17	18	19	20	21	22	23	24	25	26	27	28	29	30	31	32	33	34	35	36	Owners	Pts
1997	Derrike Cope	36	Pontiac	DAY; 36	CAR; 31	RCH; 30	ATL; DNQ	DAR; 20	TEX; 41	BRI; 16	MAR; 34	SON; 18	TAL; 13	CLT; 12	DOV; 20	POC; 11	MCH; 8	CAL; 29	DAY; 28	NHA; 20	POC; 16	IND; 41	GLN; 38	MCH; 16	BRI; 32	DAR; 14	RCH; 16	NHA; 26	DOV; 30	MAR; 36	CLT; 33	TAL; 18	CAR; 20	PHO; 16	ATL; 5					27th	2901
1998	Ernie Irvan	36	Pontiac	DAY; 6	CAR; 19	LVS; 30	ATL; 15	DAR; 36	BRI; 20	TEX; 43	MAR; 9	TAL; 6	CAL; 13	CLT; 11	DOV; 9	RCH; 29	MCH; 14	POC; 34	SON; 36	NHA; 20	POC; 9	IND; 6	GLN; 33	MCH; 6*	BRI; 22	NHA; 28	DAR; 6	RCH; 14	DOV; 8	MAR; 8	CLT; 31	TAL; 37	DAY; 8							16th	3457
1998	Ricky Craven	36	Pontiac																															PHO; 30	CAR; 37	ATL; 25				16th	3457
1999	Ernie Irvan	36	Pontiac	DAY; 14	CAR; 29	LVS; 6	ATL; 7	DAR; 24	TEX; 37	BRI; 43	MAR; 22	TAL; 40	CAL; 35	RCH; 33	CLT; 36	DOV; 35	MCH; 7	POC; 8	SON; 30	DAY; 9	NHA; 21	POC; 11	IND; 24	GLN; 41																35th	2831
1999	Dick Trickle	36	Pontiac																						MCH; 40															35th	2831
1999	Jerry Nadeau	36	Pontiac																							BRI; 20	DAR; 43	RCH; 18	NHA; 32	DOV; 16	MAR; 26	CLT; 34	TAL; 40	CAR; 37	PHO; 37	HOM; 38	ATL; 20			35th	2831
2000	Ken Schrader	36	Pontiac	DAY; 9	CAR; 13	LVS; 16	ATL; 23	DAR; 22	BRI; 26	TEX; 18	MAR; 13	TAL; 36	CAL; 24	RCH; 12	CLT; 37	DOV; 23	MCH; 16	POC; 18	SON; 15	DAY; 23	NHA; 23	POC; 19	IND; 22	GLN; 18	MCH; 19	BRI; 12	DAR; 16	RCH; 17	NHA; 10	DOV; 30	MAR; 16	CLT; 25	TAL; 37	CAR; 18	PHO; 40	HOM; 32	ATL; 26			18th	3398
2001	Ken Schrader	36	Pontiac	DAY; 13	CAR; 22	LVS; 25	ATL; 8	DAR; 13	BRI; 35	TEX; 10	MAR; 25	TAL; 40	CAL; 33	RCH; 9	CLT; 21	DOV; 36	MCH; 14	POC; 9	SON; 37	DAY; 15	CHI; 29	NHA; 22	POC; 17	IND; 28	GLN; 19	MCH; 20	BRI; 22	DAR; 10	RCH; 23	DOV; 18	KAN; 26	CLT; 14	MAR; 11	TAL; 31	PHO; 18	CAR; 19	HOM; 42	ATL; 31	NHA; 39	19th	3480
2002	Ken Schrader	36	Pontiac	DAY; 26	CAR; 35	LVS; 26	ATL; 24	DAR; 35	BRI; 22	TEX; 34	MAR; 36	TAL; 24	CAL; 43	RCH; 15	CLT; 18	DOV; 36	POC; 16	MCH; 25	SON; 38	DAY; 25	CHI; 40	NHA; 24	POC; 20	IND; 14	GLN; 28	MCH; 14	BRI; 14	DAR; 26	RCH; 26	NHA; 13	DOV; 22	KAN; 28	TAL; 41	CLT; 31	MAR; 26	ATL; 42	CAR; 22	PHO; 37	HOM; 27	30th	2954
2003	Jerry Nadeau	01	Pontiac	DAY; 28	CAR; 26	LVS; 22	ATL; 31	DAR; 35	BRI; 28	TEX; 4	TAL; 36	MAR; 41	CAL; 14																											31st	3032
2003	Jason Keller	01	Pontiac											RCH; 32																										31st	3032
2003	Mike Wallace	01	Pontiac												CLT; 31	DOV; 19	POC; 31	MCH; 23		DAY; 42	CHI; 37	NHA; 42	POC; 23																	31st	3032
2003	Boris Said	01	Pontiac																SON; 6						GLN; 39															31st	3032
2003	Mike Skinner	01	Pontiac																					IND; 35		MCH; 22	BRI; 18	DAR; 29	RCH; 18	NHA; 22	DOV; 41	TAL; 27	KAN; 29	CLT; 39	MAR; 21					31st	3032
2003	Joe Nemechek	01	Pontiac																																	ATL; 10	PHO; 31	CAR; 25	HOM; 17	31st	3032
2004	Joe Nemechek	01	Chevy	DAY; 6	CAR; 24	LVS; 19	ATL; 15	DAR; 20	BRI; 27	TEX; 14	MAR; 27	TAL; 32	CAL; 28	RCH; 36	CLT; 14	DOV; 38	POC; 18	MCH; 35	SON; 29	DAY; 10	CHI; 8	NHA; 20	POC; 16	IND; 17	GLN; 22	MCH; 13	BRI; 42	CAL; 12	RCH; 22	NHA; 6	DOV; 35	TAL; 7	KAN; 1	CLT; 5	MAR; 30	ATL; 4	PHO; 12	DAR; 8	HOM; 27	19th	3878
2005	Joe Nemechek	01	Chevy	DAY; 13	CAL; 39*	LVS; 19	ATL; 35	BRI; 33	MAR; 10	TEX; 17	PHO; 10	TAL; 31	DAR; 11	RCH; 18	CLT; 18	DOV; 27	POC; 3	MCH; 6	SON; 23	DAY; 15	CHI; 15	NHA; 18	POC; 22	IND; 28	GLN; 9	MCH; 8	BRI; 12	CAL; 10	RCH; 26	NHA; 25	DOV; 17	TAL; 9	KAN; 20	CLT; 4	MAR; 23	ATL; 18	TEX; 37	PHO; 17	HOM; 24	16th	3953
2006	Joe Nemechek	01	Chevy	DAY; 33	CAL; 27	LVS; 13	ATL; 17	BRI; 28	MAR; 23	TEX; 23	PHO; 35	TAL; 27	RCH; 28	DAR; 16	CLT; 18	DOV; 35	POC; 29	MCH; 26	SON; 25	DAY; 19	CHI; 33	NHA; 41	POC; 17	IND; 24	GLN; 42	MCH; 26	BRI; 26	CAL; 25	RCH; 32	NHA; 32	DOV; 26	KAN; 27	TAL; 18	CLT; 9	MAR; 20	ATL; 9	TEX; 18	PHO; 19	HOM; 13	27th	3255
2007	Mark Martin	01	Chevy	DAY; 2	CAL; 5	LVS; 5	ATL; 10			TEX; 3	PHO; 12		RCH; 17	DAR; 14	CLT; 11	DOV; 7	POC; 7	MCH; 29			DAY; 17	CHI; 14	IND	POC	GLN	MCH	BRI	CAL	RCH	NHA	DOV	KAN	TAL	CLT	MAR	ATL	TEX	PHO	HOM	27th	2960
2007	Regan Smith	01	Chevy					BRI; 25	MAR; 26			TAL; 24							SON; 30	NHA; 32																				27th	2960

=== Car No. 13 history ===
Part time No. 36 (2004-2006)

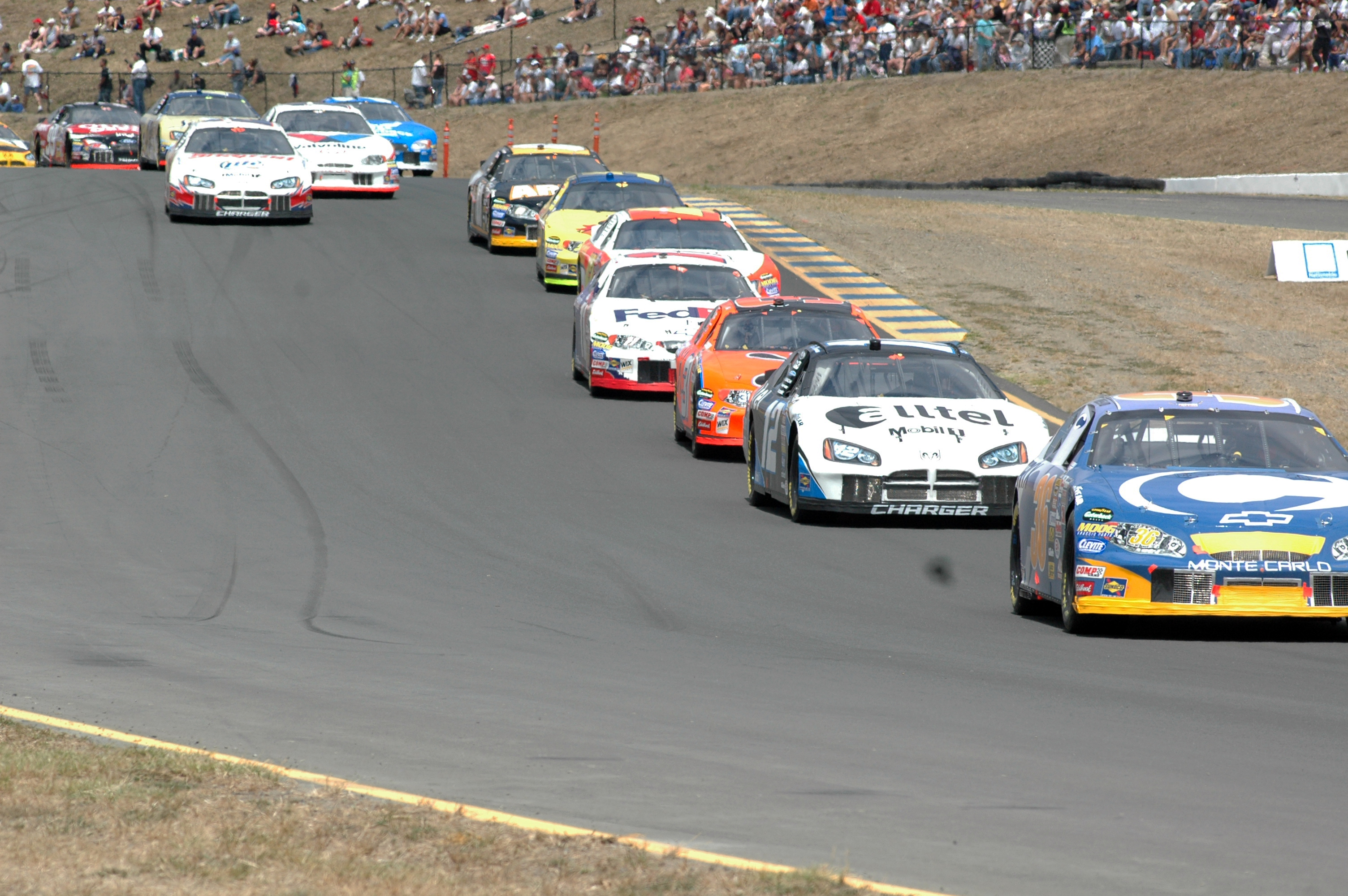
Boris Said (far right) at Sonoma in 2005.

On April 30, 2004, MB2 Motorsports announced a partnership with CENTRIX Financial, LLC, coming on as an associate sponsor for the No. 01 car and No. 10 car. In addition, the team's original number 36 would be resurrected to field a third team part-time for Road course ringer Boris Said, who had driven the No. 01 for two races in 2003 which included a pole at Sonoma. Centrix was scheduled to sponsor two races, debuting with a 6th-place finish at Sonoma. Centrix sponsored Said again at the oval track Auto Club Speedway, where he finished one lap down in 30th. USG Sheetrock (an associate on the No. 01) came on to sponsor two more races for Said, DNQing at Watkins Glen and finishing 28th in the season finale at Homestead after a transmission failure late in the race.

The No. 36 team returned for 2005, expanding Said's schedule to a minimum of 10 races beginning with the Daytona 500. Like the 10 team which was co-owned by Valvoline executive James Rocco, sponsor Centrix's owner and racing enthusiast Bob Sutton came on as an equity partner for the No.36 car, changing the team name to MB Sutton Motorsports. Said had stated that he would have liked to drive the car on a full-time basis if sponsorship was found. Veteran crew chief Frankie Stoddard would lead the No. 36 team. Said ultimately attempted 12 races, struggling on oval tracks, with a best finish of 27th at Daytona and Texas and three DNQs. He did run well at Talladega in May, qualifying 12th and running in the Top 15 before a 25-car pileup ended his day with 35 laps remaining. Boris was, however, strong as always in his road course element. At Sonoma in June, Said was running well when he entered the pits while they were closed after a caution was thrown with 40 laps to go. Sent back to 32nd place, he made it up to 13th place with 10 laps to go, but was relegated to a 17th-place finish after a caution with seven laps to go. Said shined later in the year at Watkins Glen, starting 41st after qualifying was rained out, and racing with NASCAR Road Course aces Tony Stewart and Robby Gordon for the win. Said would score a career-best 3rd-place finish. Said left the team to drive for No Fear Racing in the No. 60 Ford in 2006.

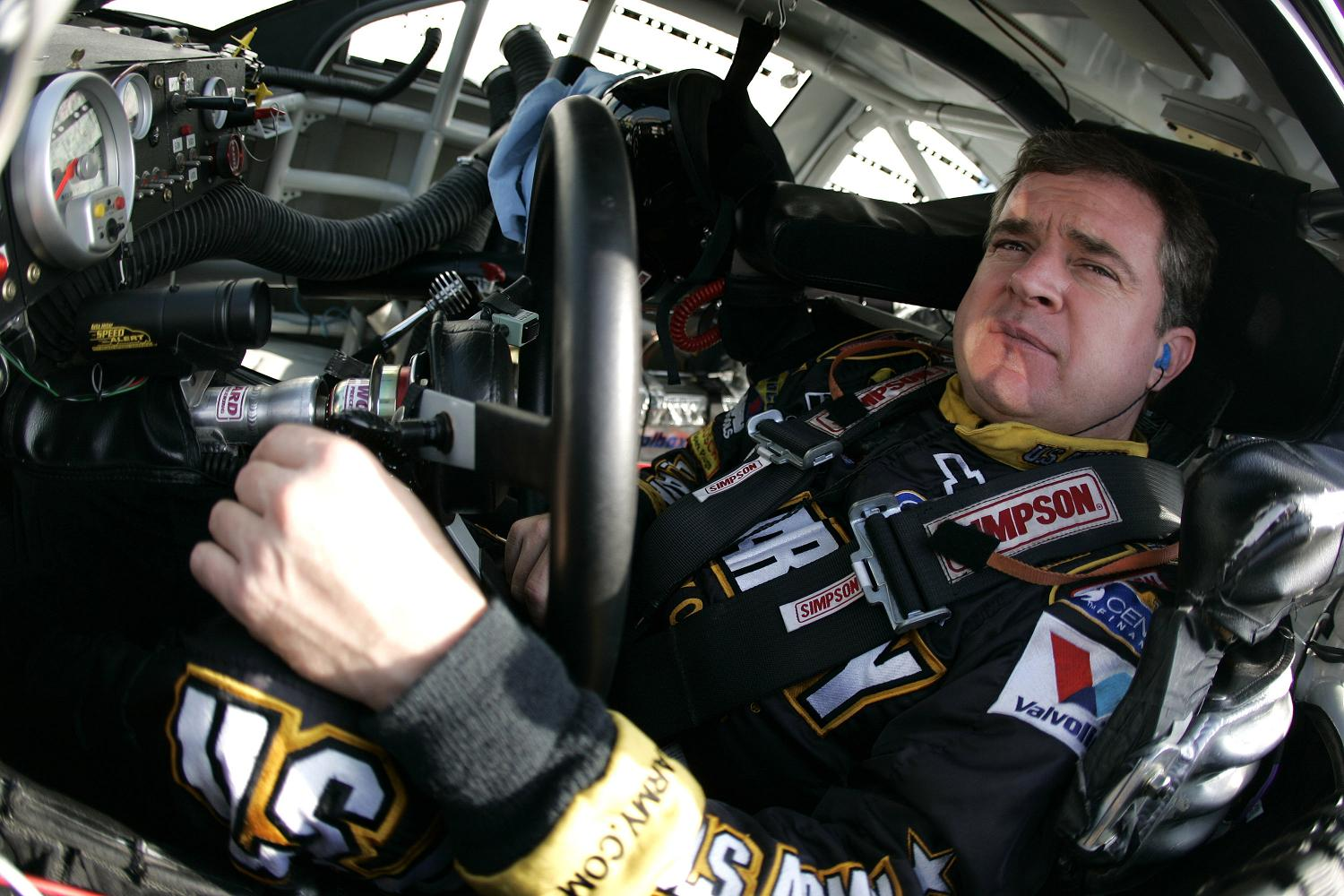
Joe Nemechek drove the team's No. 01 car from 2003 to 2006, then the No. 13 for 2007.

Early in 2006, 1988 Cup Champion and two-time Daytona 500 winner Bill Elliott announced that he would pilot the No. 36 Chevrolet in the 2006 Daytona 500, with Ginn Resorts coming on to sponsor the effort. Elliott qualified 33rd, but avoided several wrecks to finish 19th in the Great American Race. The team would not run again in 2006.

Joe Nemechek (2007)

The team went full-time in 2007, switching to No. 13 with Joe Nemechek moving over from the No. 01 and Peter Sospenzo taking on crew chief duties. CertainTeed was announced as the primary sponsor of the car for 18 races, with associate sponsor status for the other half of the season. Bobby Ginn's Ginn Resorts filled out the remaining races. Nemechek opened the year with a 9th-place finish at the Daytona 500, but missed the fifth race of the season at Bristol and did not have another Top 10 with the team for the rest of the year. After sitting 33rd in points following the race at Chicagoland, Nemechek was released from the No. 13 car as well as teammate Sterling Marlin from his No. 14 ride, with the team's status "being evaluated because of lack of sponsorship." Ultimately, the No. 13 team was shut down after the merger with DEI, and Nemechek would move to Furniture Row Racing for the remainder of the season beginning at Fontana.

==== Car No. 13 results ====
Year	Driver	No.	Make	1	2	3	4	5	6	7	8	9	10	11	12	13	14	15	16	17	18	19	20	21	22	23	24	25	26	27	28	29	30	31	32	33	34	35	36	Owners	Pts
2004	Boris Said	36	Chevy	DAY	CAR	LVS	ATL	DAR	BRI	TEX	MAR	TAL	CAL	RCH	CLT	DOV	POC	MCH	SON; 6	DAY	CHI	NHA	POC	IND	GLN; DNQ	MCH	BRI	CAL; 30	RCH	NHA	DOV	TAL	KAN	CLT	MAR	ATL	PHO	DAR	HOM; 28	55th	302
2005	Boris Said	36	Chevy	DAY; 27	CAL	LVS	ATL	BRI	MAR	TEX; 27	PHO	TAL; 35	DAR	RCH	CLT; DNQ	DOV	POC	MCH	SON; 17	DAY; 28	CHI	NHA	POC	IND; 31	GLN; 3	MCH	BRI	CAL; 30	RCH	NHA	DOV	TAL	KAN; 31	CLT; DNQ	MAR	ATL; DNQ	TEX	PHO	HOM	42nd	791
2006	Bill Elliott	36	Chevy	DAY; 19	CAL	LVS	ATL	BRI	MAR	TEX	PHO	TAL	RCH	DAR	CLT	DOV	POC	MCH	SON	DAY	CHI	NHA	POC	IND	GLN	MCH	BRI	CAL	RCH	NHA	DOV	KAN	TAL	CLT	MAR	ATL	TEX	PHO	HOM	61st	111
2007	Joe Nemechek	13	Chevy	DAY; 9	CAL; 14	LVS; 38	ATL; 17	BRI; DNQ	MAR; 27	TEX; 18	PHO; 16	TAL; 38	RCH; 33	DAR; 28	CLT; 26	DOV; 25	POC; 15	MCH; 30	SON; 38	NHA; 41	DAY; 30	CHI; 29	IND	POC	GLN	MCH	BRI	CAL	RCH	NHA	DOV	KAN	TAL	CLT	MAR	ATL	TEX	PHO	HOM	45th	1547

=== Car No. 14 history ===
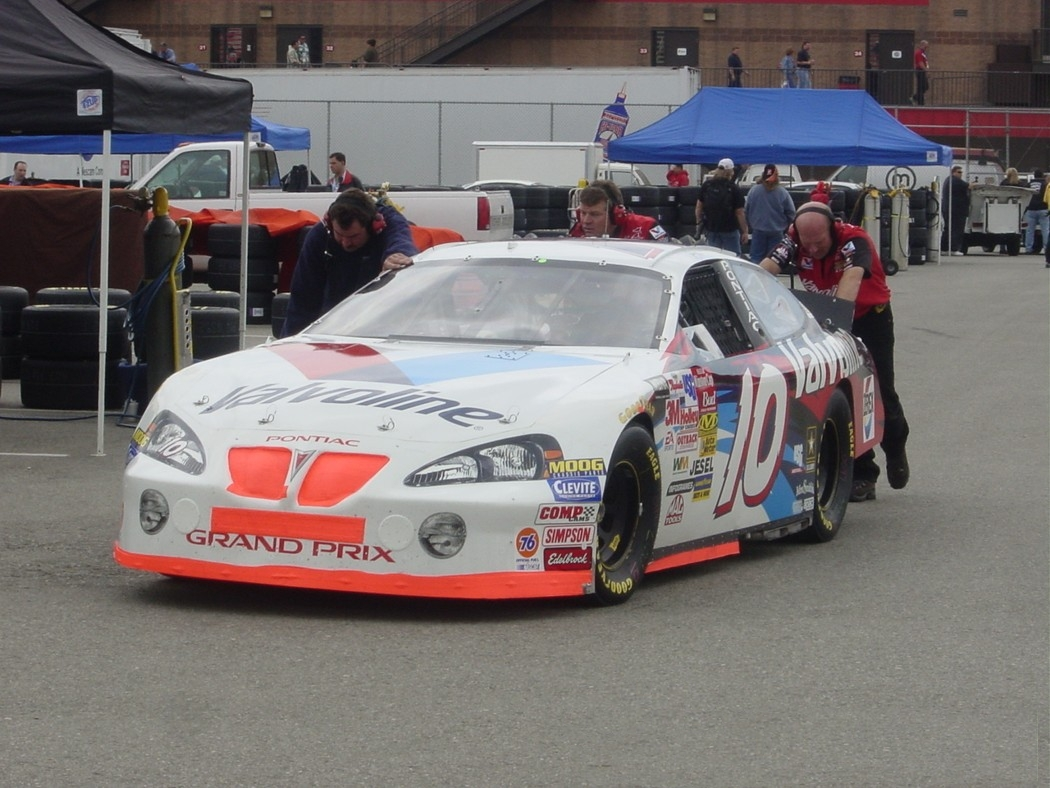
Johnny Benson in the No. 10 Pontiac for MBV in 2003.

Johnny Benson (2000-2003)

What became the No. 14 team originally ran several different numbers part of Darrell Waltrip Motorsports and the Tyler Jet Motorsports. At the second Pocono race weekend in 2000, MB2 Motorsports purchased Tyler Jet's unsponsored No. 10 team, driven by Johnny Benson. When MB2 bought the team, Benson remained the driver, with an announcement that Aaron's and RCA would sponsor the No. 10 for the remainder of 2000 and Valvoline would begin sponsoring the car in 2001. Benson finished the season driving full-time for MB2 with Aaron's and RCA on the car.

In 2001, Valvoline became the team's new sponsor, with Benson remaining the driver. Additionally, Valvoline purchased an ownership stake in the No. 10 team, becoming the first corporation to own a NASCAR team. The No. 10 team's name was changed to MBV Motorsports to reflect Valvoline's presence (though the overall team remained MB2). Benson and Valvoline returned for the full season in 2002. He eventually drove to his first career win at the 2002 Pop Secret 400 at Rockingham.

Both Benson and Valvoline remained with the car in 2003. Midway through the season, the team announced it was parting ways with Benson at the conclusion of the season.

Scott Riggs (2004-2005)

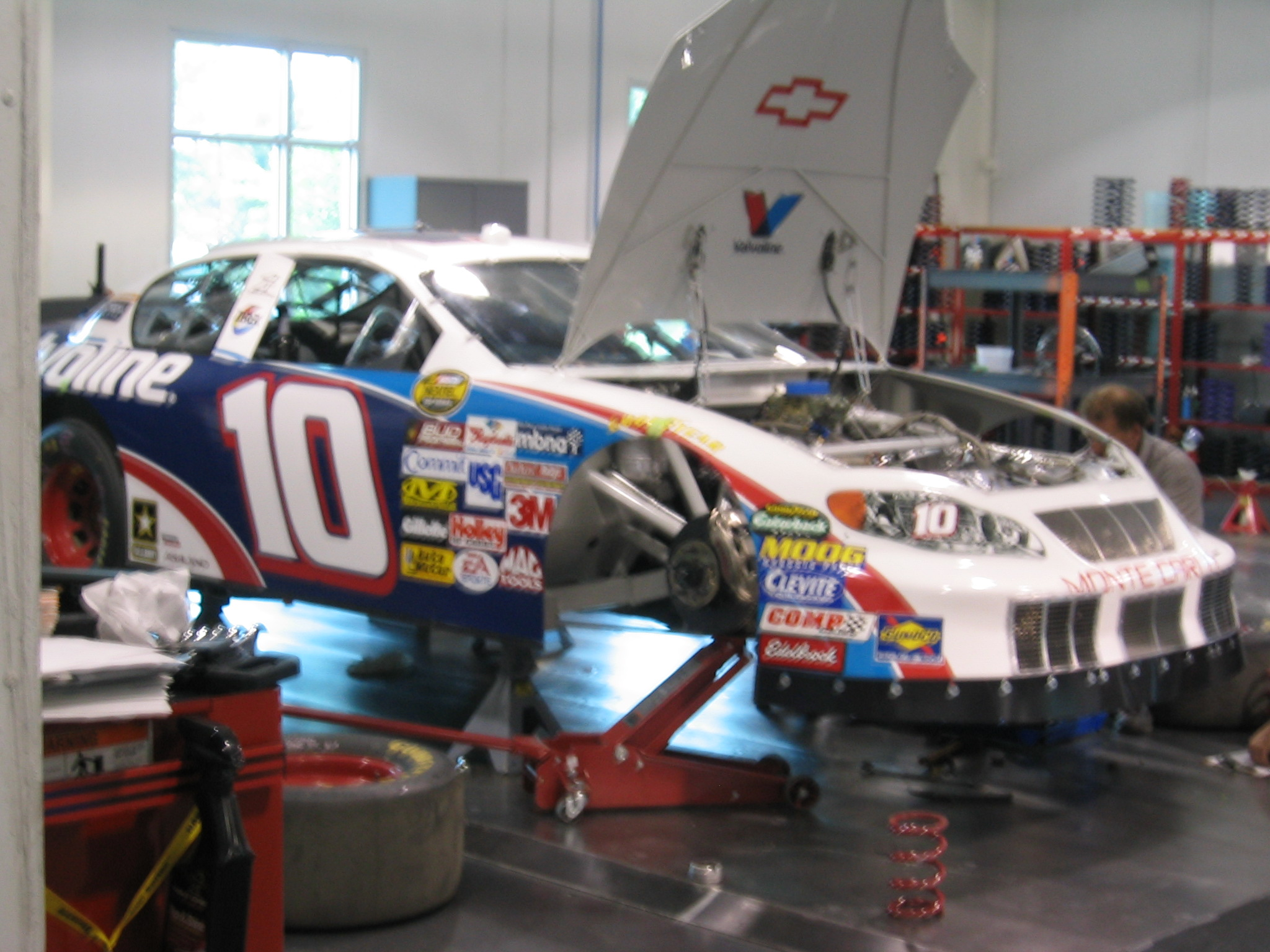
Scott Riggs' No. 10 Valvoline Chevy in the MB2 shop in 2005.

32-year-old Busch Series driver Scott Riggs was signed to a multi-year contract, and would to replace Benson for the 2004 season. Riggs was set to compete against a strong rookie class that included his former Busch Series competitors Brian Vickers, Kasey Kahne, Scott Wimmer, and Johnny Sauter as well as Truck Series driver Brendan Gaughan. With Pontiac leaving the sport, the team was forced to switch to Chevrolet. Mike Skinner ran the exhibition Budweiser Shootout in the No. 10 after winning a pole at Richmond driving the No. 01 in 2003 subbing for Jerry Nadeau. Riggs missed the fall race at Atlanta, and scored only two Top 10 finishes and had eight DNFs en route to a 29th-place finish in the points standings in his rookie season.

In 2005, Riggs won the pole at Martinsville and finished 4th in the Daytona 500. Riggs had a career best performance at Michigan, using a fuel mileage gamble to drive from 29th to 2nd place in the final 51 laps. Riggs statistics improved slightly (four Top 10 finishes), but he had seven DNFs and finished 34th in the season standings. Valvoline announced that it was to sell its ownership stake back to MB2's principal owners and ended sponsorship of the car, taking Riggs and the No. 10 to Evernham Motorsports.

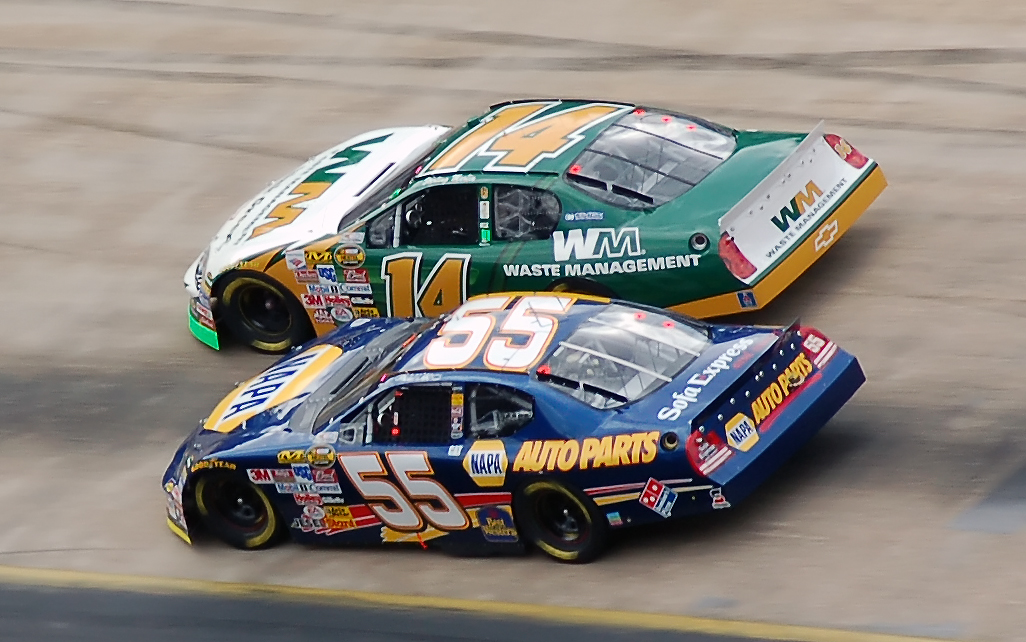
Sterling Marlin (14) racing Michael Waltrip at Bristol in 2006.

Sterling Marlin (2006-2007)

In November 2005, it was announced that veteran driver Sterling Marlin would come over from Chip Ganassi Racing to drive for MB2 in 2006. The team would be sponsored by Waste Management in 12 races, with Centrix Financial returning and Ginn Resorts coming on to fill the remainder of the schedule. In tribute to Marlin's father Coo Coo who had died the previous year, the team took on the No. 14. Midway through the season, the team replaced crew chief Doug Randolph with Scott Eggleston, who worked with Marlin at Team SABCO. The team had only one Top 10 finish and ranked 34th in points at the end of the year.

For 2007, Marlin returned as did Waste Management for 12 races, while new sponsor Panasonic signed on for 12 races as well, but no reason when the team stopped sponsoring or terminated with Panasonic at the Darlington race and veteran crew chief Slugger Labbe handled the team. After a 2007 season filled with struggles and a best finish of 13th, in July Marlin was to be replaced by Regan Smith, who had previously been co-piloting the No. 01, for the remainder of the year. However, upon the merger of Ginn Racing and DEI at Indy, and before Smith even got the chance to drive the No. 14, the No. 14 team was merged with the No. 15 team, and its owner points were carried to the Paul Menard-piloted Menards car. Smith would pilot the No. 01 full-time in 2008 with DEI.

==== Car No. 14 results ====
Year	Driver	No.	Make	1	2	3	4	5	6	7	8	9	10	11	12	13	14	15	16	17	18	19	20	21	22	23	24	25	26	27	28	29	30	31	32	33	34	35	36	Owners	Pts
2000	Johnny Benson	10	Pontiac	DAY; 12	CAR; 14	LVS; 6	ATL; DNQ	DAR; 24	BRI; 2	TEX; 42	MAR; 16	TAL; 13	CAL; 23	RCH; 25	CLT; 16	DOV; 15	MCH; 24	POC; 34	SON; 18	DAY; 13	NHA; 14	POC; 12	IND; 25	GLN; 27	MCH; 5	BRI; 13	DAR; 38	RCH; 7	NHA; 11	DOV; 2	MAR; 19	CLT; 8	TAL; 33	CAR; 11	PHO; 16	HOM; 30	ATL; 10			13th	3716
2001	Johnny Benson	10	Pontiac	DAY; 28	CAR; 6	LVS; 4	ATL; 7	DAR; 7	BRI; 26	TEX; 3	MAR; 20	TAL; 7	CAL; 11	RCH; 6	CLT; 20	DOV; 41	MCH; 12	POC; 24	SON; 29	DAY; 13	CHI; 27	NHA; 36	POC; 5	IND; 3	GLN; 16	MCH; 5	BRI; 36	DAR; 14	RCH; 10	DOV; 31	KAN; 37	CLT; 36	MAR; 6	TAL; 23	PHO; 10	CAR; 3	HOM; 20	ATL; 23	NHA; 12	11th	4152
2002	Johnny Benson	10	Pontiac	DAY; 10	CAR; 23	LVS; 32	ATL; 27	DAR; 33	BRI; 39	TEX; 13	MAR; 19	TAL; 39	CAL; 15				POC; 20	MCH; 6	SON; 16	DAY; 43			POC; 30	IND; 37	GLN; 25	MCH; 8	BRI; 12	DAR; 34	RCH; 35	NHA; 4	DOV; 10	KAN; 23	TAL; 40	CLT; 18	MAR; 2	ATL; 23	CAR; 1	PHO; 16	HOM; 13	21st	3583
2002	Joe Nemechek	10	Pontiac											RCH; 12																										21st	3583
2002	Jerry Nadeau	10	Pontiac												CLT; 28	DOV; 27						NHA; 18																		21st	3583
2002	Mike Wallace	10	Pontiac																		CHI; 38																			21st	3583
2003	Johnny Benson	10	Pontiac	DAY; 19	CAR; 13	LVS; 12	ATL; 11	DAR; 25	BRI; 19	TEX; 32	TAL; 41	MAR; 32	CAL; 36	RCH; 15	CLT; 24	DOV; 5	POC; 24	MCH; 26	SON; 30	DAY; 27	CHI; 18	NHA; 26	POC; 20	IND; 13	GLN; 27	MCH; 10	BRI; 14	DAR; 40	RCH; 9	NHA; 25	DOV; 21	TAL; 41	KAN; 35	CLT; 16	MAR; 34	ATL; 24	PHO; 21	CAR; 29	HOM; 4	24th	3448
2004	Scott Riggs	10	Chevy	DAY; 34	CAR; 31	LVS; 29	ATL; 25	DAR; 30	BRI; 34	TEX; 15	MAR; 28	TAL; 34	CAL; 25	RCH; 35	CLT; 25	DOV; 5	POC; 17	MCH; 20	SON; 42	DAY; 21	CHI; 29	NHA; 28	POC; 22	IND; 37	GLN; 23	MCH; 19	BRI; 17	CAL; 7	RCH; 39	NHA; 26	DOV; 31	TAL; 11	KAN; 26	CLT; 38	MAR; 26	ATL; DNQ	PHO; 14	DAR; 25	HOM; 15	29th	3090
2005	Scott Riggs	10	Chevy	DAY; 4	CAL; 33	LVS; 31	ATL; 9	BRI; 10	MAR; 21	TEX; 32	PHO; 18	TAL; 27	DAR; 36	RCH; 26	CLT; 19	DOV; 11	POC; 37	MCH; 23	SON; 24	DAY; 41	CHI; 23	NHA; 32	POC; 33	IND; 35	GLN; 31	MCH; 2	BRI; 40	CAL; 36	RCH; 29	NHA; 28	DOV; 24	TAL; 36	KAN; 30	CLT; 33	MAR; 24	ATL; 33	TEX; 34	PHO; 38	HOM; 38	34th	2965
2006	Sterling Marlin	14	Chevy	DAY; 34	CAL; 32	LVS; 36	ATL; 34	BRI; 17	MAR; 14	TEX; 30	PHO; 12	TAL; 37	RCH; 9	DAR; 28	CLT; 28	DOV; 31	POC; 42	MCH; 24	SON; 42	DAY; 24	CHI; 26	NHA; 16	POC; 30	IND; 31	GLN; 39	MCH; 29	BRI; 32	CAL; 29	RCH; 30	NHA; 25	DOV; 31	KAN; 20	TAL; 40	CLT; 11	MAR; 21	ATL; 20	TEX; 40	PHO; 36	HOM; 37	34th	2854
2007	Sterling Marlin	14	Chevy	DAY; 17	CAL; 35	LVS; 34	ATL; 24	BRI; 30	MAR; 21	TEX; 34	PHO; 27	TAL; 16	RCH; 23	DAR; 13	CLT; 33	DOV; 16	POC; 31	MCH; 20	SON; 43	NHA; 24	DAY; 40	CHI; 23	IND	POC	GLN	MCH	BRI	CAL	RCH	NHA	DOV	KAN	TAL	CLT	MAR	ATL	TEX	PHO	HOM	48th	1209

Johnny Benson raced races 1-18 of the 2000 season with Tyler Jet Motorsports before the team (and its Owners Points) were purchased by MB2.

=== Car No. 39 history ===
In addition to his 16-race schedule in the No. 01 shared with Mark Martin, Regan Smith was set to make his Nextel Cup debut at the 2007 Daytona 500 in a fourth Ginn Racing car, with Ginn Resorts sponsoring. The car was numbered 39 due to the No. 36 being taken by Bill Davis Racing and Jeremy Mayfield. In his debut, Smith qualified 26th, which earned him a 12th starting position in the 2nd Gatorade 150 duel race. He finished 19th of 30 cars, and 7th out of the 13 drivers who needed to race their way into the 500, which was not enough to get him into the race. The No. 39 was on the Fontana entry list the next week, but was withdrawn. Smith would make his Cup debut in the No. 01 at Bristol Motor Speedway.

=== Winston/Nextel Cup Series drivers ===
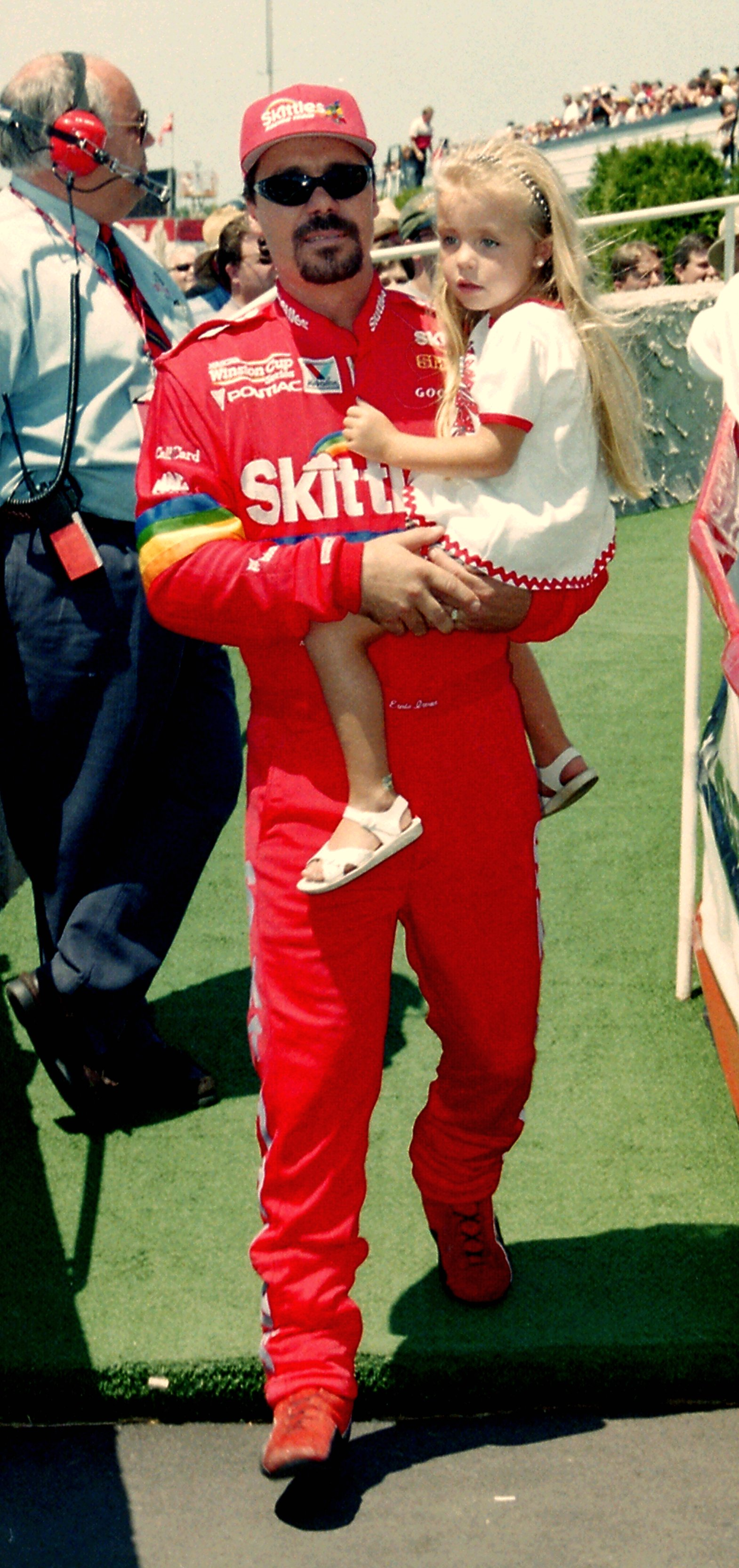
15-time winner Ernie Irvan as the driver of MB2's No. 36 Pontiac.

- Derrike Cope (1997)
- Ernie Irvan (1998-1999; retired after injury)
- Ricky Craven (1998 injury replacement for Irvan)
- Dick Trickle (1999 injury replacement for Irvan)
- Jerry Nadeau (injury replacement for Irvan in 1999; Benson in 2002; regular driver in 2003)
- Ken Schrader (2000–2002)
- Johnny Benson (2001–2003)
- Joe Nemechek (2002 injury replacement for Benson; 2003–2007)
- Mike Wallace (injury replacement for Benson in 2002; Nadeau in 2003)
- Jason Keller (2003 injury replacement for Nadeau)
- Boris Said (2003–2006; road courses & limited ovals)
- Mike Skinner (2003)
- Scott Riggs (2004–2005)
- Sterling Marlin (2006–2007)
- Bill Elliott (2006; limited schedule)
- Mark Martin (2007; limited schedule)
- Regan Smith (2007; limited schedule)

== Driver development ==
Beginning in 2006, MB2 Motorsports established a partnership with Morgan-Dollar Motorsports in the Craftsman Truck Series, fielding a full-time truck with MB2/Ginn development driver Kraig Kinser (son of Steve Kinser). Kinser struggled in his rookie season and was pulled from the ride late in the season.

For 2007, Ginn expanded its development program, signing motocross racer Ricky Carmichael and Drive for Diversity member Jesus Hernandez to development contracts. Kinser returned to the Truck Series, scheduled to share the ride with Hernandez, with Ginn Resorts sponsoring. The team also started a Busch Series team for Cup rookie Regan Smith and Kinser, also funded by Ginn Resorts. This was originally numbered No. 04, but NASCAR reassigned No. 4 to Ginn after Biagi-DenBeste Racing shut down in January 2007. The No. 4 Busch Series team was shut down after the Kentucky race in June, with Smith 12th in the championship standings at the time. Following the DEI/Ginn merger, Smith was placed in the 47 Morgan-Dollar truck for the balance of the season. Aric Almirola ran a single truck race at Nashville, finishing 23rd.

== DEI/Ginn merger ==
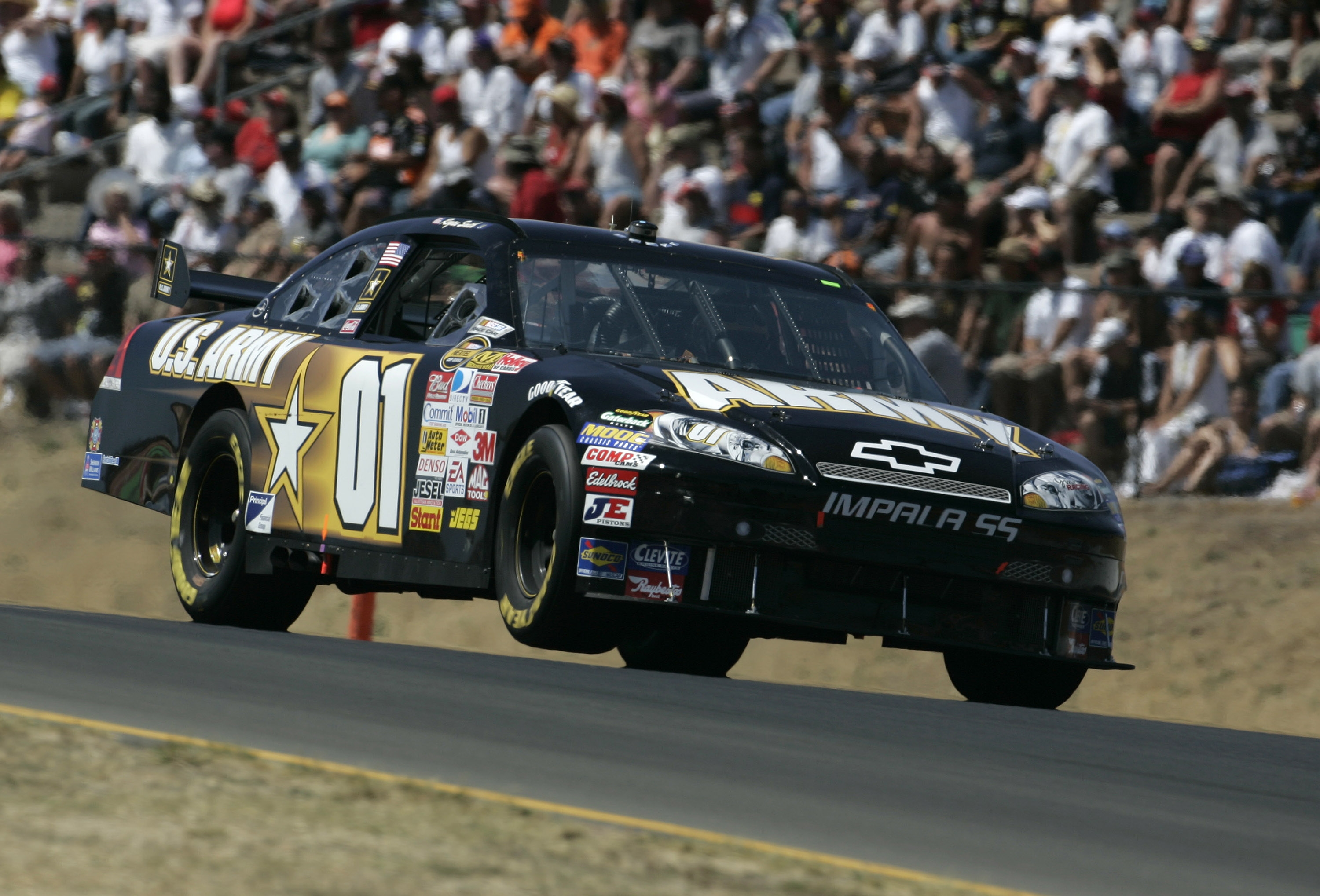
The #01 owned by Bobby Ginn (Ginn Racing); this car was later added to the DEI stable as part of the merger

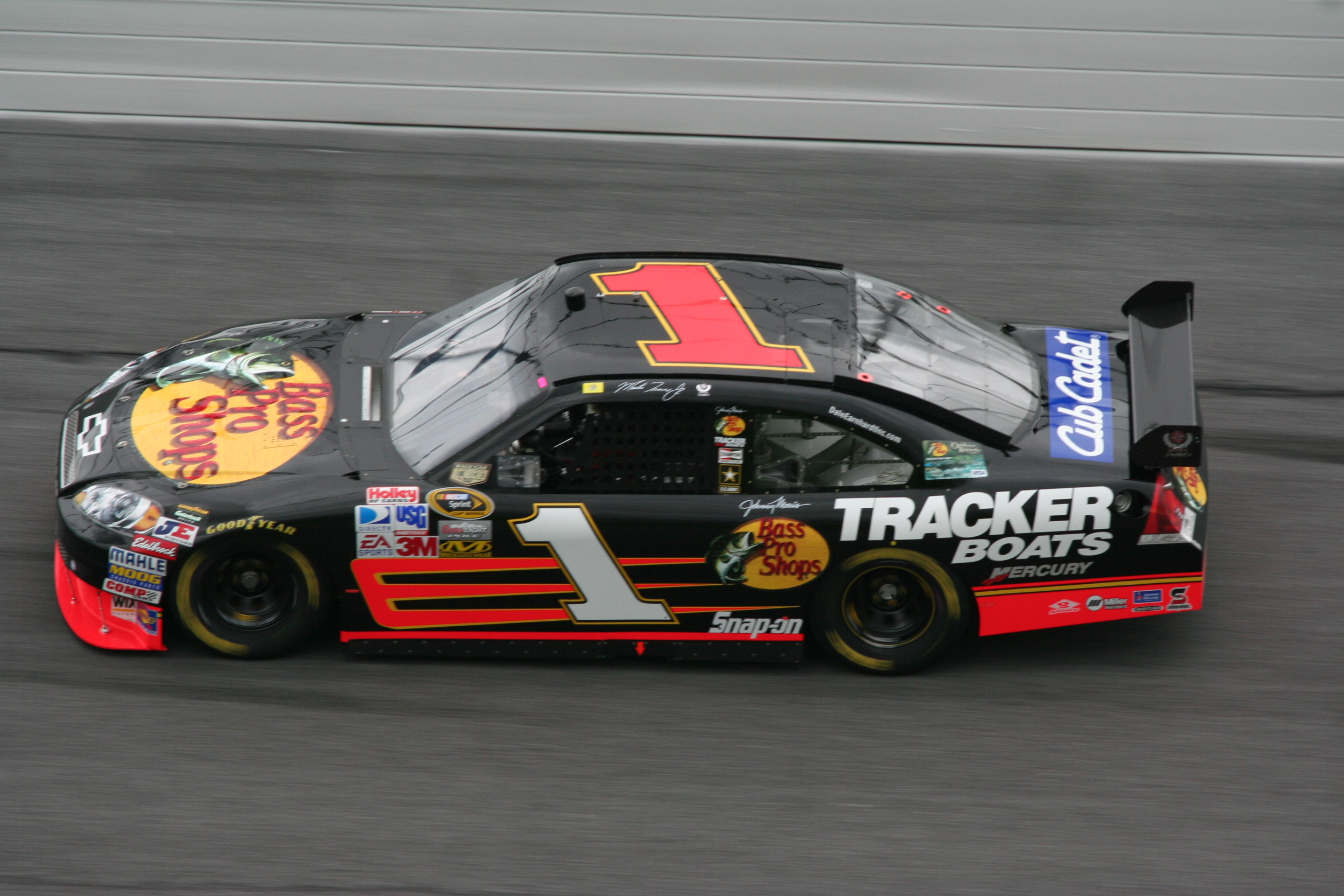
The #1 owned by Teresa Earnhardt (pictured in 2008)

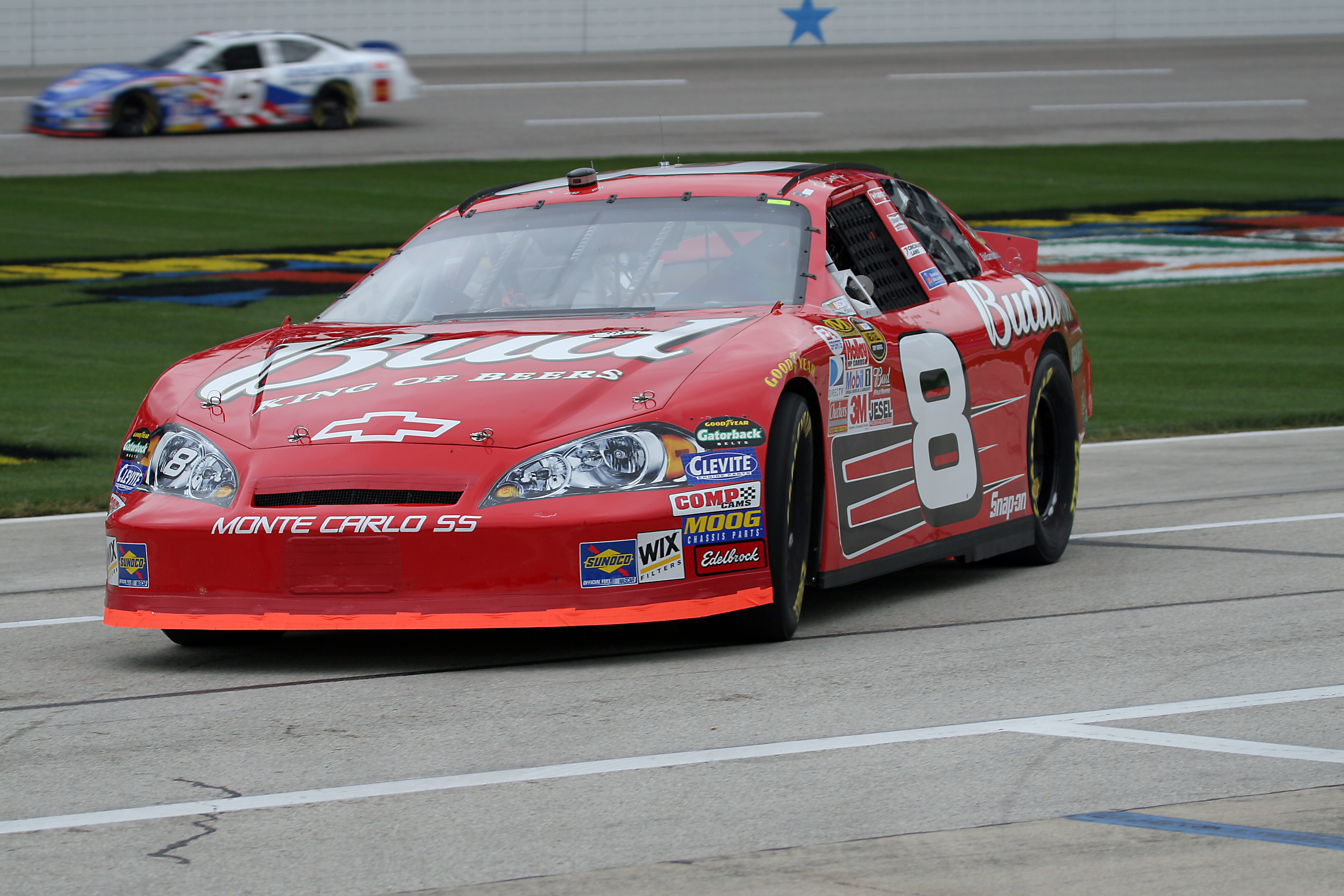
The #8 owned by Teresa Earnhardt

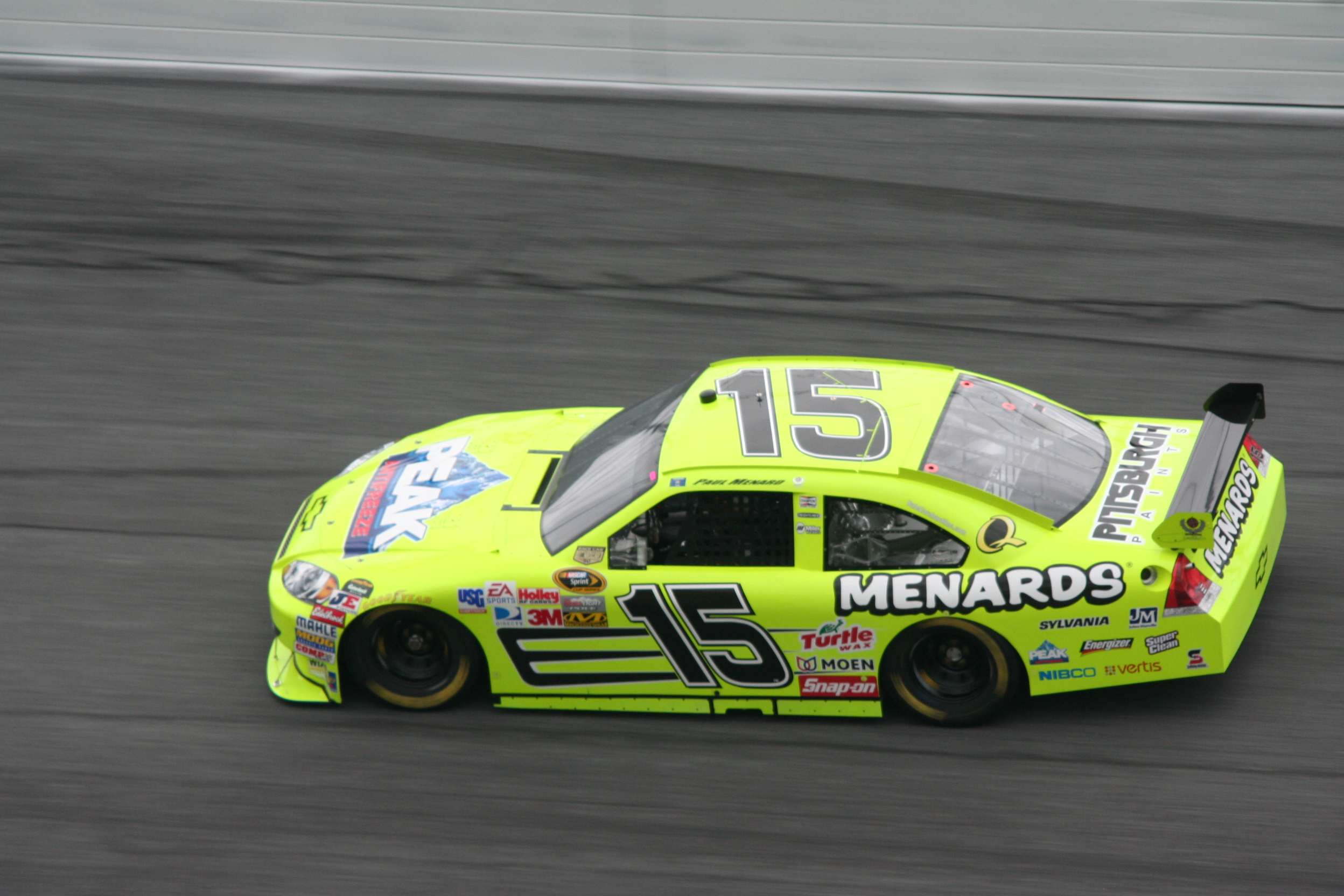
The #15 (pictured in 2008) inherited the #14 owner points, with the listed owner changing from Teresa Earnhardt to Bobby Ginn

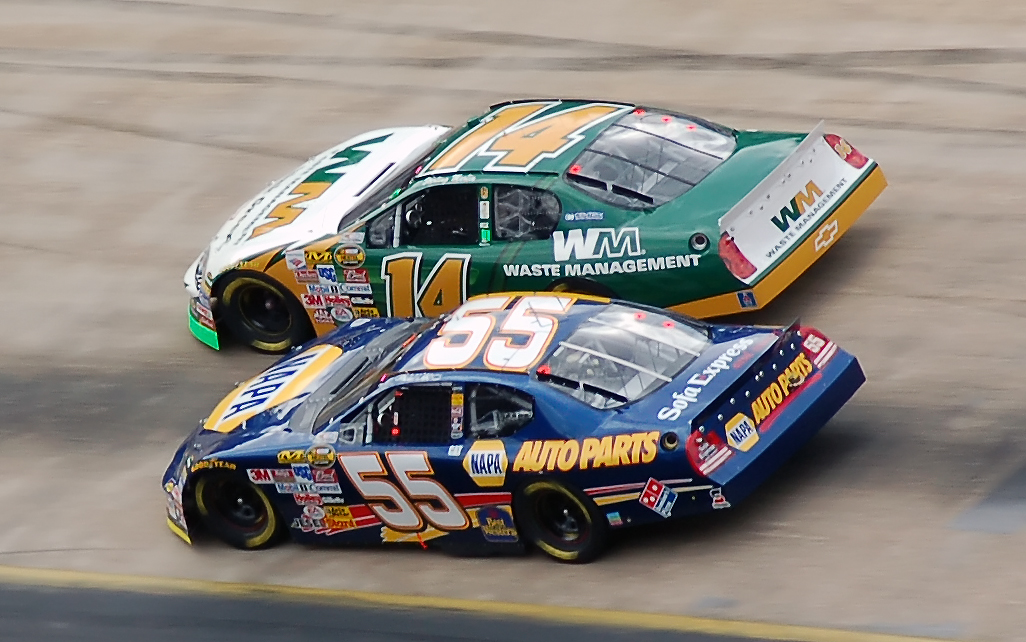
The #14 owned by Bobby Ginn (pictured in 2006) shut down after merge with DEI; the #14 inherited the #15 owner points

On July 25, 2007, Ginn Racing announced it had merged with Dale Earnhardt, Inc. The No. 01 team joined the No. 1, No. 8 and No. 15 teams. The merger did not affect the DEI team name.

The acquisition had the following effects:

- The No. 01 (Mark Martin/Aric Almirola) team was added to the DEI teams.
- The No. 15 (Paul Menard) inherited the owner points from the former No. 14 (Sterling Marlin), which guaranteed a starting spot for Menard at Indianapolis.
- The No. 13 (Joe Nemechek) and the No. 14 (Sterling Marlin) teams of Ginn Racing were disbanded.
- Bobby Ginn was listed as the owner of the No. 01 and No. 15 for the remainder of 2007; these cars were housed at the Ginn Racing shop, renamed DEI West which also houses the team's fabrication work.
- Teresa Earnhardt was listed as the owner of the No. 1 and No. 8 for the remainder of 2007; these cars remain housed at DEI's shops.

Dale Earnhardt, Inc., would eventually merge with Chip Ganassi Racing in 2009 after DEI's star driver Dale Earnhardt Jr. left for Hendrick Motorsports the year prior; the resulting team was known as Earnhardt Ganassi Racing until 2013, after which it reverted to Chip Ganassi Racing name before being purchased by Trackhouse Racing Team in 2021.
