= 2007 Brickyard 400 =

20th race of the 2007 NASCAR Nextel Cup Series season

2007 Allstate 400 at the Brickyard
Race details
- Race 20 of 36 in the 2007 NASCAR Nextel Cup Series season
- 2007 Brickyard 400 program cover
- Date: July 29, 2007
- Official name: Allstate 400 at the Brickyard
- Location: Indianapolis Motor Speedway in Speedway, Indiana
- Course: Permanent racing facility
- Course length: 2.5 miles (4.023 km)
- Distance: 160 laps, 400 mi (643.737 km)
- Weather: Temperatures up to 86 °F (30 °C); wind speeds up to 12 miles per hour (19 km/h)
- Average speed: 117.379 miles per hour (188.903 km/h)

Pole position
Driver	Reed Sorenson	Chip Ganassi Racing
- Time: 48.858

Most laps led
Driver	Tony Stewart	Joe Gibbs Racing
- Laps: 65

Winner
No. 20	Tony Stewart	Joe Gibbs Racing

Television in the United States
- Network: ESPN
- Announcers: Jerry Punch, Andy Petree and Dale Jarrett

The 2007 Allstate 400 at The Brickyard, the 14th running of the event, was the twentieth race of the 2007 NASCAR Nextel Cup Series season and the first of the season that was televised by NASCAR on ESPN. It was held on July 29, 2007, at the Indianapolis Motor Speedway in Speedway, Indiana.

== Pre-race ==
Indianapolis Motor Speedway, the race track where the race was held.

Two Nextel Cup Series teams announced changes in their ownership just before this race:

- Dale Earnhardt Inc. merged with Ginn Racing, taking over the No. 01 team of Mark Martin and Aric Almirola, and closing the Nos. 13 and 14 teams after Ginn had released Joe Nemechek and Sterling Marlin because of sponsorship difficulties. The No. 14 and No. 15 teams switched positions in the standings, guaranteeing Paul Menard, the driver of the No. 15, a starting spot. Regan Smith, who had shared driving duties with Martin, was reassigned to the Craftsman Truck Series.
- Terry Labonte filled in for Michael Waltrip in the No. 55 Toyota which originally made Bill Elliott, winner of the 2002 race, and his No. 21 Wood Brothers/JTG Racing team ineligible for the past champion's provisional since Labonte's championship is more recent than Elliott's. However, with the closing of the Nos. 13 and 14 teams from Ginn, Elliott was assured of racing in this event.
- Originally, there were 51 cars on the initial entry list, including the No. 13 team, which was left without a driver and sponsor. The No. 14 team was entered with Smith as the driver, but because of the merger between DEI and Ginn Racing, the final entry list only included 49 cars.

=== Entry list ===
- (W) denotes past Brickyard 400 winner.
- (R) denotes rookie driver.

No.	Driver	Team	Manufacturer
00	David Reutimann (R)	Michael Waltrip Racing	Toyota
01	Mark Martin	Dale Earnhardt Inc.	Chevrolet
1	Martin Truex Jr.	Dale Earnhardt Inc.	Chevrolet
2	Kurt Busch	Penske Racing South	Dodge
4	Ward Burton	Morgan-McClure Motorsports	Chevrolet
5	Kyle Busch	Hendrick Motorsports	Chevrolet
6	David Ragan (R)	Roush Fenway Racing	Ford
07	Clint Bowyer	Richard Childress Racing	Chevrolet
7	Robby Gordon	Robby Gordon Motorsports	Ford
08	Joe Nemechek	E&M Motorsports	Dodge
8	Dale Earnhardt Jr.	Dale Earnhardt Inc.	Chevrolet
9	Kasey Kahne	Evernham Motorsports	Dodge
10	Scott Riggs	Evernham Motorsports	Dodge
11	Denny Hamlin	Joe Gibbs Racing	Chevrolet
12	Ryan Newman	Penske Racing South	Dodge
15	Paul Menard (R)	Dale Earnhardt Inc.	Chevrolet
16	Greg Biffle	Roush Fenway Racing	Ford
17	Matt Kenseth	Roush Fenway Racing	Ford
18	J. J. Yeley	Joe Gibbs Racing	Chevrolet
19	Elliott Sadler	Evernham Motorsports	Dodge
20	Tony Stewart (W)	Joe Gibbs Racing	Chevrolet
21	Bill Elliott (W)	Wood Brothers Racing	Ford
22	Dave Blaney	Bill Davis Racing	Toyota
24	Jeff Gordon (W)	Hendrick Motorsports	Chevrolet
25	Casey Mears	Hendrick Motorsports	Chevrolet
26	Jamie McMurray	Roush Fenway Racing	Ford
29	Kevin Harvick (W)	Richard Childress Racing	Chevrolet
31	Jeff Burton	Richard Childress Racing	Chevrolet
33	Scott Wimmer	Richard Childress Racing	Chevrolet
36	Jeremy Mayfield	Bill Davis Racing	Toyota
37	Kevin Lepage	Front Row Motorsports	Dodge
38	David Gilliland (R)	Robert Yates Racing	Ford
40	David Stremme	Chip Ganassi Racing	Dodge
41	Reed Sorenson	Chip Ganassi Racing	Dodge
42	Juan Pablo Montoya (R)	Chip Ganassi Racing	Dodge
43	Bobby Labonte (W)	Petty Enterprises	Dodge
44	Dale Jarrett (W)	Michael Waltrip Racing	Toyota
45	Kyle Petty	Petty Enterprises	Toyota
48	Jimmie Johnson (W)	Hendrick Motorsports	Chevrolet
49	Ken Schrader	BAM Racing	Dodge
55	Terry Labonte	Michael Waltrip Racing	Toyota
66	Jeff Green	Haas CNC Racing	Chevrolet
70	Johnny Sauter	Haas CNC Racing	Chevrolet
78	Kenny Wallace	Furniture Row Racing	Chevrolet
83	Brian Vickers	Team Red Bull	Toyota
84	A. J. Allmendinger (R)	Team Red Bull	Toyota
88	Ricky Rudd (W)	Robert Yates Racing	Ford
96	Tony Raines	Hall of Fame Racing	Chevrolet
99	Carl Edwards	Roush Fenway Racing	Ford

== Qualifying ==
RANK	DRIVER	NBR	CAR	TIME	SPEED	
1	Reed Sorenson	41	Dodge	48.858	184.207	
2	Juan Pablo Montoya	42	Dodge	49.048	183.494	
3	Ryan Newman	12	Dodge	49.053	183.475	
4	Dale Earnhardt Jr.	8	Chevrolet	49.068	183.419	
5	Kasey Kahne	9	Dodge	49.080	183.374	
6	Kurt Busch	2	Dodge	49.159	183.079	
7	Jeff Burton	31	Chevrolet	49.167	183.050	
8	Greg Biffle	16	Ford	49.174	183.024	
9	Casey Mears	25	Chevrolet	49.177	183.012	
10	Denny Hamlin	11	Chevrolet	49.233	182.804	
11	Tony Raines	96	Chevrolet	49.246	182.756	
12	David Stremme	40	Dodge	49.259	182.708	
13	Mark Martin	01	Chevrolet	49.273	182.656	
14	Tony Stewart	20	Chevrolet	49.275	182.648	
15	Jamie McMurray	26	Ford	49.287	182.604	
16	Scott Riggs	10	Dodge	49.333	182.434	*
17	Elliott Sadler	19	Dodge	49.342	182.400	
18	Kyle Busch	5	Chevrolet	49.396	182.201	
19	Jimmie Johnson	48	Chevrolet	49.498	181.826	
20	Kevin Harvick	29	Chevrolet	49.519	181.748	
21	Jeff Gordon	24	Chevrolet	49.526	181.723	
22	Scott Wimmer	33	Chevrolet	49.558	181.605	*
23	J.J. Yeley	18	Chevrolet	49.559	181.602	
24	Jeff Green	66	Chevrolet	49.676	181.174	
25	Brian Vickers	83	Toyota	49.689	181.127	*
26	Clint Bowyer	07	Chevrolet	49.692	181.116	
27	Dave Blaney	22	Toyota	49.708	181.057	*
28	Paul Menard	15	Chevrolet	49.711	181.046	
29	Bobby Labonte	43	Dodge	49.753	180.894	
30	David Ragan	6	Ford	49.757	180.879	
31	Matt Kenseth	17	Ford	49.764	180.854	
32	Bill Elliott	21	Ford	49.783	180.785	
33	Martin Truex Jr.	1	Chevrolet	49.797	180.734	
34	David Reutimann	00	Toyota	49.827	180.625	*
35	Carl Edwards	99	Ford	49.829	180.618	
36	Ken Schrader	49	Dodge	49.862	180.498	*
37	Ricky Rudd	88	Ford	49.998	180.007	
38	David Gilliland	38	Ford	50.033	179.881	
39	Johnny Sauter	70	Chevrolet	50.080	179.712	
40	Ward Burton	4	Chevrolet	50.096	179.655	*
41	Joe Nemechek	08	Dodge	50.184	179.340	*
42	Terry Labonte	55	Toyota	50.189	179.322	PC
43	Kyle Petty	45	Dodge	50.227	179.186	
44	A.J. Allmendinger	84	Toyota	50.300	178.926	*
45	Kevin Lepage	37	Dodge	50.340	178.784	*
46	Dale Jarrett	44	Toyota	50.366	178.692	*
47	Jeremy Mayfield	36	Toyota	50.411	178.532	*
48	Kenny Wallace	78	Chevrolet	50.814	177.117	*
49	Robby Gordon	7	Ford	50.879	176.890	OP

OP: qualified via owners points

PC: qualified as past champion

PR: provisional

QR: via qualifying race

* - had to qualify on time

Failed to qualify, withdrew, or driver changes: Joe Nemechek (#08), A.J. Allmendinger (#84), Kevin Lepage (#37), Dale Jarrett (#44), Jeremy Mayfield (#36), Kenny Wallace (#78), Regan Smith (#14-WD), ? (#13-WD)

== Race ==
Pole sitter Reed Sorenson lead the first lap of the race. The first caution flew on lap 15 when Jeff Green crashed in turn 3. Tony Stewart won the race off of pit road and lead the field to the restart on lap 20. Dale Earnhardt Jr. would take the lead from Stewart on the restart. The second caution would fly on the same lap when Ryan Newman crashed in turn 4. Dale Jr. lead the field on the restart on lap 25. On lap 39, the third caution flew when Tony Raines and Kasey Kahne crashed and turn 1. Robby Gordon also spun trying to avoid the wreck. Dale Earnhardt Jr. won the race off of pit road and lead the field to the restart on lap 44. On lap 46, a big wreck would occur in turn 1 that took out 8 cars. It started when Jamie McMurray got loose in turn 1 and slid up into Jimmie Johnson which caused a mini chain reaction crash that also collected Scott Riggs, Bill Elliott, Ricky Rudd, Carl Edwards, J. J. Yeley, and Kyle Petty. The race restarted on lap 53. On lap 54, Tony Stewart took the lead from Dale Earnhardt Jr. On the same lap, a multi-car crash would occur in turn three. It started when Johnny Sauter came down and got turned by Casey Mears which sent the two spinning while collecting Elliott Sadler and Kyle Petty. The race restarted on lap 60 with Stewart as the leader. On lap 61, the 6th caution of the race would occur when Jimmie Johnson blew a left front tire and hit the wall in turn 3 which ended up causing his car to catch on fire. Juan Pablo Montoya won the race off of pit road but Kyle Busch, Brian Vickers, Matt Kenseth, Martin Truex Jr, and Scott Riggs did not pit and Busch lead the field to the restart on lap 68. On lap 76, the 7th caution flew for debris. During pit stops, Kurt Busch's rear bumper fell off after Scott Wimmer made contact with him. Tony Stewart lead the field to the restart on lap 80. On lap 90, the 8th caution flew for debris. Greg Biffle won the race off of pit road and lead the field to the restart on lap 98.

=== Final Laps ===
On lap 103, Kevin Harvick took the lead. With 50 laps to go, Tony Stewart took the lead from Harvick. With 34 to go, Kyle Busch took the lead as green flag pit stops began. Stewart would get the lead back with 32 to go. With 25 to go, the 9th and final caution flew when Dale Earnhardt Jr's engine blew. Stewart led the field to the restart with 20 to go. Kevin Harvick would pass Stewart in turns 1 and 2. Harvick had built a manageable lead but Stewart closed in on him. Stewart on his radio as he was closing on Harvick said "Here kitty kitty kitty! Come get you some of this!" Stewart made a few attempts to pass Harvick but never could. Finally, with 10 to go, Stewart passed Harvick and took the lead. Harvick started to fall back after he and Stewart touched down the backstretch. Stewart would eventually take home his 2nd and last Brickyard 400 win of his career while also taking his 2nd win on the season and the 2nd in a row. Juan Pablo Montoya, Jeff Gordon, Kyle Busch, and Reed Sorenson rounded out the top 5 while Mark Martin, Kevin Harvick (who dropped from first to 7th), Jeff Burton, Dave Blaney, and Matt Kenseth rounded out the top 10.

=== Results ===
Pos.	No.	Driver	Car	Team
1.	20	Tony Stewart (W)	Chevrolet	Joe Gibbs Racing
2.	42	Juan Pablo Montoya (R)	Dodge	Chip Ganassi Racing
3.	24	Jeff Gordon (W)	Chevrolet	Hendrick Motorsports
4.	5	Kyle Busch	Chevrolet	Hendrick Motorsports
5.	41	Reed Sorenson	Dodge	Chip Ganassi Racing
6.	01	Mark Martin	Chevrolet	Dale Earnhardt, Inc.
7.	29	Kevin Harvick (W)	Chevrolet	Richard Childress Racing
8.	31	Jeff Burton	Chevrolet	Richard Childress Racing
9.	22	Dave Blaney	Toyota	Bill Davis Racing
10.	17	Matt Kenseth	Ford	Roush Fenway Racing
11.	2	Kurt Busch	Dodge	Penske Racing South
12.	1	Martin Truex Jr.	Chevrolet	Dale Earnhardt, Inc.
13.	07	Clint Bowyer	Chevrolet	Richard Childress Racing
14.	4	Ward Burton	Chevrolet	Morgan-McClure Motorsports
15.	16	Greg Biffle	Ford	Roush Fenway Racing
16.	6	David Ragan (R)	Ford	Roush Fenway Racing
17.	38	David Gilliland (R)	Ford	Yates/Newman/Haas/Lanigan Racing
18.	99	Carl Edwards	Ford	Roush Fenway Racing
19.	43	Bobby Labonte (W)	Dodge	Petty Enterprises
20.	15	Paul Menard (R)	Chevrolet	Dale Earnhardt, Inc.
21.	83	Brian Vickers	Toyota	Team Red Bull
22.	11	Denny Hamlin	Chevrolet	Joe Gibbs Racing
23.	21	Bill Elliott (W)	Ford	Wood Brothers/JTG Racing
24.	88	Ricky Rudd (W)	Ford	Yates/Newman/Haas/Lanigan Racing
25.	49	Ken Schrader	Dodge	BAM Racing
26.	40	David Stremme	Dodge	Chip Ganassi Racing
27.	7	Robby Gordon	Ford	Robby Gordon Motorsports
28.	19	Elliott Sadler	Dodge	Evernham Motorsports
29.	10	Scott Riggs	Dodge	Evernham Motorsports
30.	55	Terry Labonte	Toyota	Michael Waltrip Racing
31.	33	Scott Wimmer	Chevrolet	Richard Childress Racing
32.	45	Kyle Petty	Dodge	Petty Enterprises
33.	26	Jamie McMurray	Ford	Roush Fenway Racing
34.	8	Dale Earnhardt Jr.	Chevrolet	Dale Earnhardt, Inc.
35.	25	Casey Mears	Chevrolet	Hendrick Motorsports
36.	18	J. J. Yeley	Chevorolet	Joe Gibbs Racing
37.	70	Johnny Sauter	Chevrolet	Haas CNC Racing
38.	00	David Reutimann (R)	Toyota	Michael Waltrip Racing
39.	48	Jimmie Johnson (W)	Chevrolet	Hendrick Motorsports
40.	9	Kasey Kahne	Dodge	Evernham Motorsports
41.	96	Tony Raines	Chevrolet	Hall of Fame Racing
42.	12	Ryan Newman	Dodge	Penske Racing South
43.	66	Jeff Green	Chevrolet	Haas CNC Racing
Failed to Quality
Pos.	No.	Driver	Car	Team
	08	Joe Nemechek	Chevrolet	EM Motorsports
	84	A. J. Allmendinger (R)	Toyota	Team Red Bull
	37	Kevin Lepage	Dodge	Front Row Motorsports
	44	Dale Jarrett (W)	Toyota	Michael Waltrip Racing
	36	Jeremy Mayfield	Toyota	Bill Davis Racing
	78	Kenny Wallace	Chevrolet	Furniture Row Racing

=== Notes ===
- For the first time in history, there was not a testing session before this race.
- This race marked the second time an Indy NASCAR race was on cable television. Either ABC or NBC televised all 13 of the previous events except for 1995, when ESPN showed the race on one day's tape delay. This time, the 400 was originally scheduled to air on ESPN, while ABC would not takeover the broadcast until September. Additionally, this was the first NASCAR Cup race aired on ESPN since the 2000 season finale of what was then the Winston Cup Series.
- Dale Jarrett's failure to qualify meant that only 4 drivers had started every Brickyard 400 since its inception in 1994: Jeff Gordon, Bobby Labonte, Mark Martin, and Bill Elliott.
- Kevin Harvick, who led part of the race until Stewart overtook him on lap 149, missed the victory by a close finish to become the 3rd driver to win the Daytona 500 and the Brickyard 400 in the same year.

== Post-race ==
For the second time since 2004, a winning driver uttered an obscenity in a live post-race interview when Stewart said "This one's for every one of those fans in the stands who pull for me every week and take all the bullshit from everybody else" to then ESPN pit reporter Dave Burns. At first, it was perceived to be in response to critics who have gone after his blunt and abrasive personality, but it has since been reported that Stewart was the subject of statements made by Pardon the Interruption co-hosts Tony Kornheiser and Michael Wilbon on the show that aired the day after Stewart's win at the USG Sheetrock 400. After Stewart joked about celebrating the victory by drinking a case of Schlitz beer, the co-hosts concluded that the driver was a bad role model for children. Whether the comments were a form of revenge against the network is open for interpretation.

On the Tuesday after the race, Stewart was fined US$25,000 by NASCAR, and lost 25 points in the driver's championship due to the infraction. His team, Joe Gibbs Racing, also was penalized 25 points in the owners' championship. However, his classification of fifth in the championship standings remained the same despite the penalty. Dale Earnhardt Jr., who said the word "shit" after winning the 2004 EA Sports 500 at Talladega Superspeedway had been given the same penalty that year.

Previous race: 2007 USG Sheetrock 400	Nextel Cup Series; 2007 season	Next race: 2007 Pennsylvania 500
