= 2006 3M Performance 400 =

Race details
- Race 15 of 36 in the 2006 NASCAR Nextel Cup Series
- 2006 3M Performance 400 program cover
- Date: June 18, 2006
- Official name: 3M Performance 400
- Location: Michigan International Speedway, Brooklyn, Michigan
- Course: Permanent racing facility
- Course length: 2.0 miles (3.218 km)
- Distance: 129 laps, 258 mi (415.211 km)
- Scheduled distance: 200 laps, 400 mi (643.738 km)
- Average speed: 118.788 miles per hour (191.171 km/h)

Pole position
Driver	Kasey Kahne	Evernham Motorsports
- Time: 38.784

Most laps led
Driver	Jeff Gordon	Hendrick Motorsports
- Laps: 50

Winner
No. 9	Kasey Kahne	Evernham Motorsports

The 2006 3M Performance 400 Presented by Post-it Picture Paper was a NASCAR Nextel Cup Series stock car race held on June 18, 2006 at Michigan International Speedway in Brooklyn, Michigan. Contested over 129 laps – shortened from 200 laps due to rain – on the 2-mile (3.2-kilometre) speedway, it was the 15th race of the 2006 NASCAR Nextel Cup Series season. Kasey Kahne of Evernham Motorsports won the race.

== Background ==
Michigan International Speedway (MIS) is a 2-mile (3.2-kilometre) moderate-banked D-shaped speedway located off U.S. Highway 12 on more than 1,400 acres (5.7 km^{2}) approximately 4 miles (6.4 kilometres) south of the village of Brooklyn, in the scenic Irish Hills area of southeastern Michigan. The track is used primarily for NASCAR events. It is sometimes known as a "sister track" to Texas World Speedway, and was used as the basis of Auto Club Speedway. The track is owned by International Speedway Corporation (ISC). Michigan International Speedway is recognized as one of motorsports' premier facilities because of its wide racing surface and high banking (by open-wheel standards; the 18-degree banking is modest by stock car standards).

== Entry list ==
Car #	Driver	Hometown	Make	Sponsor	Team	Crew Chief
01	Joe Nemechek	Lakeland, FL	Chevrolet	U.S. Army	Bobby Ginn	
1	Martin Truex Jr	Mayetta, NJ	Chevrolet	Bass Pro Shops / Tracker	Teresa Earnhardt	
2	Kurt Busch	Las Vegas, NV	Dodge	Miller Lite	Roger Penske	
4	Scott Wimmer	Wausau, WI	Chevrolet	AERO Exhaust	Larry McClure	
5	Kyle Busch	Las Vegas, NV	Chevrolet	Kellogg's	Rick Hendrick	
6	Mark Martin	Batesville, AR	Ford	AAA	Jack Roush	
07	Clint Bowyer	Emporia, KS	Chevrolet	Jack Daniel's	Richard Childress	
7	Robby Gordon	Bellflower, CA	Chevrolet	Menards / MAPEI	Robby Gordon	
8	Dale Earnhardt Jr	Kannapolis, NC	Chevrolet	Budweiser	Teresa Earnhardt	
9	Kasey Kahne	Enumclaw, WA	Dodge	Dodge Dealers / UAW / "Click"	Ray Evernham	
10	Scott Riggs	Bahama, NC	Dodge	Stanley Tools / Valvoline	James Rocco	
11	Denny Hamlin	Chesterfield, VA	Chevrolet	FedEx Express	J D Gibbs	
12	Ryan Newman	South Bend, IN	Dodge	Alltel	Roger Penske	
14	Sterling Marlin	Columbia, TN	Chevrolet	Waste Mngmnt-Ginn Clubs / Resorts	Bobby Ginn	
16	Greg Biffle	Vancouver, WA	Ford	National Guard / Charter Communications	Geoff Smith	
17	Matt Kenseth	Cambridge, WI	Ford	Carhartt	Mark Martin	
18	JJ Yeley	Phoenix, AZ	Chevrolet	Interstate Batteries	Joe Gibbs	
19	Jeremy Mayfield	Owensboro, KY	Dodge	Dodge Dealers / UAW	Ray Evernham	
20	Tony Stewart	Rushville, IN	Chevrolet	The Home Depot	Joe Gibbs	
21	Ken Schrader	Fenton, MO	Ford	Motorcraft Genuine Parts	Glen Wood	
22	Dave Blaney	Hartford, OH	Dodge	Caterpillar Ground Engaging Tools	Bill Davis	
23	Bill Lester	Oakland, CA	Dodge	Waste Management	Gail Davis	
24	Jeff Gordon	Vallejo, CA	Chevrolet	DuPont	Rick Hendrick	
25	Brian Vickers	Thomasville, NC	Chevrolet	GMAC	Mary Hendrick	
26	Jamie McMurray	Joplin, MO	Ford	IRWIN Industrial Tools	Georgetta Roush	
29	Kevin Harvick	Bakersfield, CA	Chevrolet	Reese's	Richard Childress	
31	Jeff Burton	South Boston, VA	Chevrolet	Cingular Wireless	Richard Childress	
32	Travis Kvapil	Janesville, WI	Chevrolet	Tide-Downy	Calvin Wells III	
34	Mike Skinner	Ontario, CA	Chevrolet	Front Row Motorsports	Brad Jenkins	
37	Carl Long	Roxboro, NC	Dodge	R&J Racing	John Carter	
38	Elliott Sadler	Emporia, VA	Ford	M&M's	Robert Yates	
40	David Stremme	South Bend, IN	Dodge	Lone Star Steakhouse / Saloon	Felix Sabates	
41	Reed Sorenson	Peachtree City, GA	Dodge	Target	Chip Ganassi	
42	Casey Mears	Bakersfield, CA	Dodge	Texaco / Havoline	Floyd Ganassi	
43	Bobby Labonte	Corpus Christi, TX	Dodge	Cheerios / Betty Crocker	Richard L Petty	
45	Kyle Petty	Trinity, NC	Dodge	Wells Fargo	Kyle Petty	
48	Jimmie Johnson	El Cajon, CA	Chevrolet	Lowe's	Jeff Gordon	
49	Kevin Lepage	Shelburne, VT	Dodge	RoadLoans.com	Elizabeth Morgenthau	
51	Mike Garvey	McDonough, GA	Chevrolet	Marathon American Spirit Motor Oil	Joe Auer	
55	Michael Waltrip	Owensboro, KY	Dodge	NAPA Auto Parts	Douglas Bawel	
61	Chad Chaffin	Smyrna, TN	Dodge	Peak Performance	Bob Jenkins	
66	Jeff Green	Owensboro, KY	Chevrolet	Best Buy	Gene Haas	
74	Derrike Cope	Spanaway, WA	Dodge	Howes Lubricator / Royal Administration	Raynard McGlynn	
78	Kenny Wallace	St. Louis, MO	Chevrolet	Furniture Row Racing	Barney Visser	
88	Dale Jarrett	Hickory, NC	Ford	UPS	Robert Yates	
96	Tony Raines	LaPorte, IN	Chevrolet	DLP HDTV	Bill Saunders	
99	Carl Edwards	Columbia, MO	Ford	Office Depot	Jack Roush	

== Qualifying ==
Pos	Car #	Driver	Make	Primary Sponsor	Speed	Time	Behind
1	9	Kasey Kahne	Dodge	Dodge Dealers / UAW / "Click"	185.644	38.784	0.000
2	24	Jeff Gordon	Chevrolet	DuPont	185.543	38.805	-0.021
3	25	Brian Vickers	Chevrolet	GMAC	184.995	38.920	-0.136
4	48	Jimmie Johnson	Chevrolet	Lowe's	184.943	38.931	-0.147
5	43	Bobby Labonte	Dodge	Cheerios / Betty Crocker	184.810	38.959	-0.175
6	8	Dale Earnhardt Jr	Chevrolet	Budweiser	184.606	39.002	-0.218
7	1	Joe Nemechek	Chevrolet	U.S. Army	184.252	39.077	-0.293
8	6	Mark Martin	Ford	AAA	184.007	39.129	-0.345
9	7	Clint Bowyer	Chevrolet	Jack Daniel's	183.758	39.182	-0.398
10	16	Greg Biffle	Ford	National Guard / Charter Communications	183.589	39.218	-0.434
11	1	Martin Truex Jr	Chevrolet	Bass Pro Shops / Tracker	183.552	39.226	-0.442
12	31	Jeff Burton	Chevrolet	Cingular Wireless	183.496	39.238	-0.454
13	2	Kurt Busch	Dodge	Miller Lite	183.337	39.272	-0.488
14	18	JJ Yeley	Chevrolet	Interstate Batteries	183.309	39.278	-0.494
15	5	Kyle Busch	Chevrolet	Kellogg's	183.271	39.286	-0.502
16	10	Scott Riggs	Dodge	Stanley Tools / Valvoline	183.262	39.288	-0.504
17	20	Tony Stewart	Chevrolet	The Home Depot	182.746	39.399	-0.615
18	19	Jeremy Mayfield	Dodge	Dodge Dealers / UAW	182.709	39.407	-0.623
19	29	Kevin Harvick	Chevrolet	Reese's	182.699	39.409	-0.625
20	17	Matt Kenseth	Ford	Carhartt	182.621	39.426	-0.642
21	11	Denny Hamlin	Chevrolet	FedEx Express	182.371	39.480	-0.696
22	21	Ken Schrader	Ford	Motorcraft Genuine Parts	182.279	39.500	-0.716
23	32	Travis Kvapil	Chevrolet	Tide-Downy	182.011	39.558	-0.774
24	7	Robby Gordon	Chevrolet	Menards / MAPEI	181.947	39.572	-0.788
25	41	Reed Sorenson	Dodge	Target	181.896	39.583	-0.799
26	14	Sterling Marlin	Chevrolet	Waste Mngmnt-Ginn Clubs / Resorts	181.878	39.587	-0.803
27	66	Jeff Green	Chevrolet	Best Buy	181.832	39.597	-0.813
28	55	Michael Waltrip	Dodge	NAPA Auto Parts	181.791	39.606	-0.822
29	49	Kevin Lepage	Dodge	RoadLoans.com	181.680	39.630	-0.846
30	40	David Stremme	Dodge	Lone Star Steakhouse / Saloon	181.187	39.738	-0.954
31	99	Carl Edwards	Ford	Office Depot	181.128	39.751	-0.967
32	38	Elliott Sadler	Ford	M&M's	181.118	39.753	-0.969
33	22	Dave Blaney	Dodge	Caterpillar Ground Engaging Tools	180.868	39.808	-1.024
34	23	Bill Lester	Dodge	Waste Management	180.846	39.813	-1.029
35	45	Kyle Petty	Dodge	Wells Fargo	180.510	39.887	-1.103
36	4	Scott Wimmer	Chevrolet	AERO Exhaust	180.198	39.956	-1.172
37	42	Casey Mears	Dodge	Texaco / Havoline	180.194	39.957	-1.173
38	74	Derrike Cope	Dodge	Howes Lubricator / Royal Administration	180.162	39.964	-1.180
39	96	Tony Raines	Chevrolet	DLP HDTV	179.951	40.011	-1.227
41	88	Dale Jarrett	Ford	UPS	179.668	40.074	-1.290
41	26	Jamie McMurray	Ford	IRWIN Industrial Tools	177.488	40.566	-1.782
42	12	Ryan Newman	Dodge	Alltel	0.000	0.000	0.000
43	34	Mike Skinner	Chevrolet	Front Row Motorsports	179.928	40.016	-1.232
Failed to qualify or withdrew
44	37	Carl Long	Dodge	R & J Racing		40.124	
45	51	Mike Garvey	Chevrolet	Marathon American Spirit Motor Oil		40.162	
46	61	Chad Chaffin	Dodge	Peak Performance		40.352	
47	78	Jimmy Spencer	Chevrolet	Furniture Row Racing		40.445	
WD	95	Stanton Barrett	Chevrolet	TheRaceSpace.com	0.000	0.000	0.000

== Results ==
Fin	St	#	Driver	Sponsor	Make	Laps	Led	Status	Pts
1	1	9	Kasey Kahne	Dodge Dealers, UAW, Click	Dodge	129	19	running	185
2	31	99	Carl Edwards	Office Depot	Ford	129	25	running	175
3	6	8	Dale Earnhardt, Jr.	Budweiser	Chevy	129	3	running	170
4	10	16	Greg Biffle	National Guard, Charter Communications	Ford	129	11	running	165
5	25	41	Reed Sorenson	Target	Dodge	129	3	running	160
6	4	48	Jimmie Johnson	Lowe's	Chevy	129	0	running	150
7	37	42	Casey Mears	Texaco, Havoline	Dodge	129	0	running	146
8	2	24	Jeff Gordon	DuPont	Chevy	129	50	running	152
9	13	2	Kurt Busch	Miller Lite	Dodge	129	0	running	138
10	19	29	Kevin Harvick	Reese's	Chevy	129	0	running	134
11	12	31	Jeff Burton	Cingular Wireless	Chevy	129	0	running	130
12	21	11	Denny Hamlin	FedEx Express	Chevy	129	0	running	127
13	20	17	Matt Kenseth	Carhartt	Ford	129	0	running	124
14	15	5	Kyle Busch	Kellogg's	Chevy	129	9	running	126
15	42	12	Ryan Newman	Alltel	Dodge	129	0	running	118
16	11	1	Martin Truex, Jr.	Bass Pro Shops, Tracker Boats	Chevy	129	0	running	115
17	3	25	Brian Vickers	GMAC	Chevy	129	7	running	117
18	24	7	Robby Gordon	Menards, MAPEI	Chevy	129	0	running	109
19	30	40	David Stremme	Lone Star Steakhouse & Saloon	Dodge	129	0	running	106
20	40	88	Dale Jarrett	UPS	Ford	129	0	running	103
21	23	32	Travis Kvapil	Tide, Downy	Chevy	129	0	running	100
22	32	38	Elliott Sadler	M&M's	Ford	129	0	running	97
23	41	26	Jamie McMurray	Irwin Industrial Tools	Ford	129	0	running	94
24	26	14	Sterling Marlin	Waste Management, Ginn Clubs & Resorts	Chevy	129	0	running	91
25	28	55	Michael Waltrip	NAPA Auto Parts	Dodge	129	0	running	88
26	7	01	Joe Nemechek	U.S. Army	Chevy	129	0	running	85
27	8	6	Mark Martin	AAA	Ford	129	0	running	82
28	5	43	Bobby Labonte	Cheerios, Betty Crocker	Dodge	129	0	running	79
29	16	10	Scott Riggs	Stanley Tools, Valvoline	Dodge	129	0	running	76
30	33	22	Dave Blaney	Caterpillar Ground Engaging Tools	Dodge	129	0	running	73
31	36	4	Scott Wimmer	Aero Exhaust	Chevy	129	0	running	70
32	34	23	Bill Lester	Waste Management	Dodge	129	0	running	67
33	27	66	Jeff Green	Best Buy	Chevy	129	0	running	64
34	29	49	Kevin Lepage	RoadLoans.com	Dodge	129	1	running	66
35	35	45	Kyle Petty	Wells Fargo	Dodge	129	1	running	63
36	18	19	Jeremy Mayfield	Dodge Dealers, UAW	Dodge	129	0	running	55
37	43	34	Mike Skinner	Front Row Motorsports	Chevy	129	0	running	52
38	39	96	Tony Raines	DLP HDTV	Chevy	126	0	running	49
39	9	07	Clint Bowyer	Jack Daniel's	Chevy	86	0	running	46
40	14	18	J.J. Yeley	Interstate Batteries	Chevy	80	0	running	43
41	17	20	Tony Stewart	Home Depot	Chevy	58	0	crash	40
42	22	21	Ken Schrader	Motorcraft	Ford	30	0	crash	37
43	38	74	Derrike Cope	Howes Lubricator, Royal Administration Services	Dodge	12	0	overheating	34
Failed to qualify or withdrew
44		37	Carl Long	R & J Racing	Dodge				
45		51	Mike Garvey	Marathon American Spirit Motor Oil	Chevrolet				
46		61	Chad Chaffin	Peak Performance	Dodge				
47		78	Jimmy Spencer	Furniture Row Racing	Chevrolet				
WD		95	Stanton Barrett	TheRaceSpace.com	Chevrolet				

== Race statistics ==
- Time of race: 2:10:19
- Average speed: 118.788 miles per hour (191.171 km/h)
- Pole speed: 185.644 miles per hour (298.765 km/h)
- Cautions: 9 for 37 laps
- Margin of victory: under caution
- Lead changes: 17
- Percent of race run under caution: 28.7%
- Average green flag run: 10.2 laps

Previous race: 2006 Pocono 500	Nextel Cup Series; 2006 season	Next race: 2006 Dodge/Save Mart 350
