= 2006 Pocono 500 =

Race details
- Race 14 of 36 in the 2006 NASCAR Nextel Cup Series
- 2006 Pocono 500 program cover, featuring the Pocono scenery
- Date: June 11, 2006
- Official name: Pocono 500
- Location: Pocono Raceway Long Pond, Pennsylvania
- Course: Permanent racing facility
- Course length: 2.5 miles (4.023 km)
- Distance: 200 laps, 500 mi (804.672 km)
- Weather: Chilly with temperatures approaching 62.6 °F (17.0 °C); wind speeds up to 18.3 miles per hour (29.5 km/h)
- Average speed: 131.656 miles per hour (211.880 km/h)

Pole position
Driver	Denny Hamlin	Joe Gibbs Racing
- Time: 53.054

Most laps led
Driver	Denny Hamlin	Joe Gibbs Racing
- Laps: 83

Winner
No. 11	Denny Hamlin	Joe Gibbs Racing

Television in the United States
- Network: Fox Broadcasting Company
- Announcers: Mike Joy, Darrell Waltrip and Larry McReynolds

The 2006 Pocono 500 was a NASCAR Nextel Cup Series race that was held on June 11, 2006 at Pocono Raceway in Long Pond, Pennsylvania. It was the fourteenth race of the 2006 NASCAR Nextel Cup Series season. Denny Hamlin of Joe Gibbs Racing won the race, for his first career Nextel Cup Series win.

== Qualifying ==
Pos	Car #	Driver	Make	Primary Sponsor	Speed	Time	Behind
1	11	Denny Hamlin	Chevrolet	FedEx Ground	169.639	53.054	0.000
2	2	Kurt Busch	Dodge	Miller Lite	169.485	53.102	-0.048
3	9	Kasey Kahne	Dodge	Dodge Dealers / UAW	169.011	53.251	-0.197
4	25	Brian Vickers	Chevrolet	GMAC	168.792	53.320	-0.266
5	31	Jeff Burton	Chevrolet	Cingular Wireless	168.505	53.411	-0.357
6	24	Jeff Gordon	Chevrolet	DuPont	168.281	53.482	-0.428
7	16	Greg Biffle	Ford	Subway / National Guard	168.256	53.490	-0.436
8	26	Jamie McMurray	Ford	IRWIN Industrial Tools	168.168	53.518	-0.464
9	5	Kyle Busch	Chevrolet	CARQUEST	168.026	53.563	-0.509
10	48	Jimmie Johnson	Chevrolet	Lowe's	167.958	53.585	-0.531
11	8	Dale Earnhardt Jr	Chevrolet	Budweiser	167.838	53.623	-0.569
12	29	Kevin Harvick	Chevrolet	GM Goodwrench	167.838	53.623	-0.569
13	38	Elliott Sadler	Ford	Mega M&M's	167.826	53.627	-0.573
14	12	Ryan Newman	Dodge	Alltel	167.713	53.663	-0.609
15	1	Martin Truex Jr	Chevrolet	Bass Pro Shops / Tracker	167.345	53.781	-0.727
16	14	Sterling Marlin	Chevrolet	Waste Management	167.311	53.792	-0.738
17	10	Scott Riggs	Dodge	Valvoline / Stanley Tools	167.159	53.841	-0.787
18	20	Tony Stewart	Chevrolet	The Home Depot	166.988	53.896	-0.842
19	66	Jeff Green	Chevrolet	Best Buy	166.982	53.898	-0.844
20	6	Mark Martin	Ford	AAA	166.932	53.914	-0.860
21	1	Joe Nemechek	Chevrolet	U.S. Army	166.827	53.948	-0.894
22	42	Casey Mears	Dodge	Texaco / Havoline	166.790	53.960	-0.906
23	43	Bobby Labonte	Dodge	Cheerios / Betty Crocker	166.630	54.012	-0.958
24	18	JJ Yeley	Chevrolet	Husqvarna	166.506	54.052	-0.998
25	17	Matt Kenseth	Ford	DEWALT	166.436	54.075	-1.021
26	19	Jeremy Mayfield	Dodge	Dodge Dealers / UAW	166.260	54.132	-1.078
27	88	Dale Jarrett	Ford	UPS	166.180	54.158	-1.104
28	7	Robby Gordon	Chevrolet	Menards / MAPEI	165.831	54.272	-1.218
29	21	Ken Schrader	Ford	Little Debbie	165.752	54.298	-1.244
30	22	Dave Blaney	Dodge	Caterpillar	165.706	54.313	-1.259
31	96	Tony Raines	Chevrolet	DLP HDTV	165.359	54.427	-1.373
32	40	David Stremme	Dodge	Coors Light	165.029	54.536	-1.482
33	45	Kyle Petty	Dodge	National Tire & Battery	165.023	54.538	-1.484
34	78	Jimmy Spencer	Chevrolet	Furniture Row Racing	165.010	54.542	-1.488
35	41	Reed Sorenson	Dodge	Target	164.965	54.557	-1.503
36	55	Michael Waltrip	Dodge	NAPA Auto Parts	164.408	54.742	-1.688
37	61	Chad Chaffin	Ford	Peak Performance	164.299	54.778	-1.724
38	32	Travis Kvapil	Chevrolet	Tide-Downy	164.264	54.790	-1.736
39	44	Terry Labonte	Chevrolet	Kellogg's	164.258	54.792	-1.738
40	99	Carl Edwards	Ford	Office Depot	164.234	54.800	-1.746
41	49	Kevin Lepage	Dodge	Pocono Manor Golf Resort / Spa	164.213	54.807	-1.753
42	7	Clint Bowyer	Chevrolet	DIRECTV	164.138	54.832	-1.778
43	51	Mike Garvey	Chevrolet	Marathon American Spirit Motor Oil	163.782	54.951	-1.897
Failed to qualify
44	4	Scott Wimmer	Chevrolet	AERO Exhaust		54.991	
45	74	Derrike Cope	Dodge	Sundance Vacations / Fendler & Assoc.		55.217	
46	95	Stanton Barrett	Chevrolet	TheRaceSpace.com		55.302	
47	34	Greg Sacks	Chevrolet	Oak Glove Co.		55.359	
48	72	Brent Sherman	Dodge	Dutch Quality Stone / Boral		55.458	

== Results ==
POS	ST	#	DRIVER	SPONSOR / OWNER	CAR	LAPS	MONEY	STATUS	LED	PTS
1	1	11	Denny Hamlin	FedEx Ground (Joe Gibbs)	Chevrolet	200	220100	running	83	190
2	2	2	Kurt Busch	Miller Lite (Roger Penske)	Dodge	200	193258	running	31	175
3	18	20	Tony Stewart	The Home Depot (Joe Gibbs)	Chevrolet	200	182311	running	6	170
4	4	25	Brian Vickers	GMAC (Rick Hendrick)	Chevrolet	200	117850	running	19	165
5	25	17	Matt Kenseth	DeWalt (Jack Roush)	Ford	200	141641	running	3	160
6	7	16	Greg Biffle	Subway / National Guard (Jack Roush)	Ford	200	106425	running	34	155
7	3	9	Kasey Kahne	Dodge Dealers / UAW (Ray Evernham)	Dodge	200	117189	running	1	151
8	17	10	Scott Riggs	Valvoline / Stanley Tools (James Rocco)	Dodge	200	80125	running	1	147
9	5	31	Jeff Burton	Cingular Wireless (Richard Childress)	Chevrolet	200	104520	running	11	143
10	10	48	Jimmie Johnson	Lowe's (Rick Hendrick)	Chevrolet	200	123761	running	0	134
11	14	12	Ryan Newman	Alltel (Roger Penske)	Dodge	200	114933	running	1	135
12	23	43	Bobby Labonte	Cheerios / Betty Crocker (Petty Enterprises)	Dodge	200	110911	running	0	127
13	12	29	Kevin Harvick	GM Goodwrench (Richard Childress)	Chevrolet	200	109661	running	0	124
14	11	8	Dale Earnhardt, Jr.	Budweiser (Dale Earnhardt, Inc.)	Chevrolet	200	104966	running	0	121
15	24	18	J.J. Yeley	Husqvarna (Joe Gibbs)	Chevrolet	200	104500	running	0	118
16	31	96	Tony Raines	DLP HDTV (Bill Saunders)	Chevrolet	200	68275	running	0	115
17	20	6	Mark Martin	AAA (Jack Roush)	Ford	200	82275	running	0	112
18	8	26	Jamie McMurray	Irwin Industrial Tools (Jack Roush)	Ford	200	110900	running	0	109
19	38	32	Travis Kvapil	Tide / Downy (Cal Wells)	Chevrolet	200	85683	running	1	111
20	13	38	Elliott Sadler	Mega M&M's (Yates Racing)	Ford	200	97908	running	0	103
21	42	07	Clint Bowyer	DirecTV (Richard Childress)	Chevrolet	200	79875	running	8	105
22	9	5	Kyle Busch	Carquest (Rick Hendrick)	Chevrolet	200	81175	running	0	97
23	26	19	Jeremy Mayfield	Dodge Dealers / UAW (Ray Evernham)	Dodge	200	97266	running	0	94
24	15	1	Martin Truex, Jr.	Bass Pro Shops / Tracker (Dale Earnhardt, Inc.)	Chevrolet	199	90258	running	0	91
25	40	99	Carl Edwards	Office Depot (Jack Roush)	Ford	199	82775	running	1	93
26	32	40	David Stremme	Coors Light (Chip Ganassi)	Dodge	199	87783	running	0	85
27	30	22	Dave Blaney	Caterpillar (Bill Davis)	Dodge	199	77033	running	0	82
28	36	55	Michael Waltrip	NAPA Auto Parts (Doug Bawel)	Dodge	198	74672	running	0	79
29	21	01	Joe Nemechek	U.S. Army (Nelson Bowers)	Chevrolet	198	91320	running	0	76
30	29	21	Ken Schrader	Little Debbie (Wood Brothers)	Ford	197	92039	running	0	73
31	41	49	Kevin Lepage	Pocono Manor Golf Resort & Spa (Beth Ann Morgenthau)	Dodge	197	61675	running	0	70
32	34	78	Jimmy Spencer	Furniture Row Racing (Barney Visser)	Chevrolet	197	61525	running	0	67
33	37	61	Chad Chaffin	Peak Performance (Jeff Stec)	Ford	196	62275	running	0	64
34	6	24	Jeff Gordon	DuPont (Rick Hendrick)	Chevrolet	189	109461	crash	0	61
35	28	7	Robby Gordon	Menards / MAPEI (Robby Gordon)	Chevrolet	186	60975	running	0	58
36	35	41	Reed Sorenson	Target (Chip Ganassi)	Dodge	183	68750	running	0	55
37	19	66	Jeff Green	Best Buy (Gene Haas)	Chevrolet	181	68575	rear gear	0	52
38	27	88	Dale Jarrett	UPS (Yates Racing)	Ford	181	92525	running	0	49
39	39	44	Terry Labonte	Kellogg's (Rick Hendrick)	Chevrolet	118	60325	brakes	0	46
40	33	45	Kyle Petty	National Tire & Battery (Petty Enterprises)	Dodge	68	68175	crash	0	43
41	43	51	Mike Garvey	Marathon American Spirit Motor Oil (Joe Auer)	Chevrolet	67	60035	suspension	0	40
42	16	14	Sterling Marlin	Waste Management (Nelson Bowers)	Chevrolet	18	59885	engine	0	37
43	22	42	Casey Mears	Texaco / Havoline (Chip Ganassi)	Dodge	1	94255	crash	0	34
Failed to qualify
POS	NAME	NBR	SPONSOR	OWNER	CAR					
44	Scott Wimmer	4	AERO Exhaust	Larry McClure	Chevrolet					
45	Derrike Cope	74	Sundance Vacations / Fendler & Assoc.	Raynard McGlynn	Dodge					
46	Stanton Barrett	95	TheRaceSpace.com	Stanton Barrett	Chevrolet					
47	Greg Sacks	34	Oak Glove Co.	Bob Jenkins	Chevrolet					
48	Brent Sherman	72	Dutch Quality Stone / Boral	Bryan Mullet	Dodge					

Previous race: 2006 Neighborhood Excellence 400	Nextel Cup Series; 2006 season	Next race: 2006 3M Performance 400
