= 2006 Sony HD 500 =

Race details
- Race 25 of 36 in the 2006 NASCAR Nextel Cup Series
- 2006 Sony HD 500 program cover
- Date: September 3, 2006
- Official name: Sony HD 500
- Location: California Speedway, Fontana, California
- Course: Permanent racing facility
- Course length: 2.0 miles (3.219 km)
- Distance: 250 laps, 500 mi (804.672 km)
- Average speed: 144.462 miles per hour (232.489 km/h)
- Attendance: 102,000

Pole position
Driver	Kurt Busch	Penske Racing
- Time: 39.016

Most laps led
Driver	Kasey Kahne	Evernham Motorsports
- Laps: 130

Winner
No. 9	Kasey Kahne	Evernham Motorsports

Television in the United States
- Network: NBC
- Announcers: Bill Weber and Wally Dallenbach Jr.

The 2006 Sony HD 500 was a NASCAR Nextel Cup Series stock car race held on September 3, 2006 at California Speedway in Fontana, California. Contested over 250 laps on the 2-mile (3.2-kilometre) asphalt D-shaped oval, it was the twenty-fifth race of the 2006 NASCAR Nextel Cup Series season. Kasey Kahne of Evernham Motorsports won the race.

== Background ==
The track, California Speedway, was a four-turn superspeedway that was 2 miles (3.2 kilometres) long. The track's turns were banked from fourteen degrees, while the front stretch, the location of the finish line, was banked at eleven degrees. Unlike the front stretch, the backstraightaway was banked at three degrees.

== Qualifying ==
Pos	Car #	Driver	Make	Primary Sponsor	Speed	Time	Behind
1	2	Kurt Busch	Dodge	Miller Lite	184.540	39.016	0.000
2	25	Brian Vickers	Chevrolet	Garnier Fructis	184.049	39.120	-0.104
3	7	Clint Bowyer	Chevrolet	Jack Daniel's	183.505	39.236	-0.220
4	10	Scott Riggs	Dodge	Valvoline / Stanley Tools	183.197	39.302	-0.286
5	1	Martin Truex Jr	Chevrolet	Bass Pro Shops / Tracker	182.950	39.355	-0.339
6	8	Dale Earnhardt Jr	Chevrolet	Budweiser	182.792	39.389	-0.373
7	31	Jeff Burton	Chevrolet	Cingular Wireless	182.672	39.415	-0.399
8	11	Denny Hamlin	Chevrolet	FedEx Express	182.454	39.462	-0.446
9	9	Kasey Kahne	Dodge	Dodge Dealers / UAW	182.292	39.497	-0.481
10	5	Kyle Busch	Chevrolet	Kellogg's	182.223	39.512	-0.496
11	17	Matt Kenseth	Ford	DEWALT	182.209	39.515	-0.499
12	12	Ryan Newman	Dodge	Sony HDTV	181.951	39.571	-0.555
13	1	Joe Nemechek	Chevrolet	U.S. Army	181.722	39.621	-0.605
14	24	Jeff Gordon	Chevrolet	DuPont	181.438	39.683	-0.667
15	29	Kevin Harvick	Chevrolet	GM Goodwrench	181.087	39.760	-0.744
16	48	Jimmie Johnson	Chevrolet	Lowe's	180.941	39.792	-0.776
17	4	Scott Wimmer	Chevrolet	Lucas Oil / Forward Air	180.736	39.837	-0.821
18	19	Elliott Sadler	Dodge	Dodge Dealers / UAW	180.727	39.839	-0.823
19	18	JJ Yeley	Chevrolet	Imitrex / GSK	180.709	39.843	-0.827
20	38	David Gilliland	Ford	Pedigree	180.560	39.876	-0.860
21	16	Greg Biffle	Ford	National Guard / Charter Communications	180.519	39.885	-0.869
22	20	Tony Stewart	Chevrolet	The Home Depot	180.180	39.960	-0.944
23	00	Bill Elliott	Chevrolet	Burger King	180.099	39.978	-0.962
24	99	Carl Edwards	Ford	Office Depot	180.027	39.994	-0.978
25	7	Robby Gordon	Chevrolet	World Series of Poker	179.964	40.008	-0.992
26	44	Terry Labonte	Chevrolet	GMAC	179.964	40.008	-0.992
27	14	Sterling Marlin	Chevrolet	Ginn Clubs & Resorts	179.721	40.062	-1.046
28	43	Bobby Labonte	Dodge	Cheerios / Betty Crocker	179.677	40.072	-1.056
29	21	Ken Schrader	Ford	U.S. Air Force	179.641	40.080	-1.064
30	66	Jeff Green	Chevrolet	"According to Jim" / Best Buy	179.636	40.081	-1.065
31	26	Jamie McMurray	Ford	Smirnoff Ice	179.462	40.120	-1.104
32	40	David Stremme	Dodge	Coors Light	179.426	40.128	-1.112
33	42	Casey Mears	Dodge	Texaco / Havoline	178.931	40.239	-1.223
34	41	Reed Sorenson	Dodge	Diet Pepsi / Target	178.869	40.253	-1.237
35	45	Kyle Petty	Dodge	Schwan's Home Service	178.740	40.282	-1.266
36	88	Dale Jarrett	Ford	UPS	178.545	40.326	-1.310
37	55	Michael Waltrip	Dodge	NAPA Auto Parts	178.505	40.335	-1.319
38	6	Mark Martin	Ford	AAA	178.086	40.430	-1.414
39	49	Kevin Lepage	Dodge	LoansDepot.com	177.765	40.503	-1.487
40	78	Kenny Wallace	Chevrolet	Furniture Row Racing	177.738	40.509	-1.493
41	22	Dave Blaney	Dodge	Caterpillar	176.978	40.683	-1.667
42	96	Tony Raines	Chevrolet	DLP HDTV	175.310	41.070	-2.054
43	32	Travis Kvapil	Chevrolet	Tide-Downy	177.274	40.615	-1.599
Failed to qualify
44	06	Todd Kluever	Ford	3M Post-It			
45	34	Kertus Davis	Chevrolet	Oak Glove Co.			
46	61	Chad Chaffin	Dodge	Oak Gloves / Embassy Suites			
47	23	Bill Lester	Dodge	Waste Management			

== Results ==
POS	ST	#	DRIVER	SPONSOR / OWNER	CAR	LAPS	MONEY	STATUS	LED	PTS
1	9	9	Kasey Kahne	Dodge Dealers / UAW (Ray Evernham)	Dodge	250	279214	running	130	190
2	6	8	Dale Earnhardt Jr.	Budweiser (Dale Earnhardt, Inc.)	Chevrolet	250	206266	running	6	175
3	3	07	Clint Bowyer	Jack Daniel's (Richard Childress)	Chevrolet	250	167950	running	0	165
4	24	99	Carl Edwards	Office Depot (Jack Roush)	Ford	250	142725	running	2	165
5	14	24	Jeff Gordon	DuPont (Rick Hendrick)	Chevrolet	250	160061	running	42	160
6	8	11	Denny Hamlin	FedEx Express (Joe Gibbs)	Chevrolet	250	107000	running	29	155
7	11	17	Matt Kenseth	DeWalt (Jack Roush)	Ford	250	146641	running	0	146
8	10	5	Kyle Busch	Kellogg's (Rick Hendrick)	Chevrolet	250	114775	running	11	147
9	22	20	Tony Stewart	The Home Depot (Joe Gibbs)	Chevrolet	250	149611	running	0	138
10	36	88	Dale Jarrett	UPS (Yates Racing)	Ford	250	140725	running	0	134
11	16	48	Jimmie Johnson	Lowe's (Rick Hendrick)	Chevrolet	250	141986	running	0	130
12	38	6	Mark Martin	AAA (Jack Roush)	Ford	250	110625	running	3	132
13	18	19	Elliott Sadler	Dodge Dealers / UAW (Ray Evernham)	Dodge	250	133666	running	8	129
14	33	42	Casey Mears	Texaco / Havoline (Chip Ganassi)	Dodge	250	129583	running	0	121
15	15	29	Kevin Harvick	GM Goodwrench (Richard Childress)	Chevrolet	250	132686	running	0	118
16	7	31	Jeff Burton	Cingular Wireless (Richard Childress)	Chevrolet	250	120145	running	0	115
17	4	10	Scott Riggs	Valvoline / Stanley Tools (James Rocco)	Dodge	250	92900	running	0	112
18	5	1	Martin Truex Jr.	Bass Pro Shops / Tracker (Dale Earnhardt, Inc.)	Chevrolet	250	118258	running	0	109
19	19	18	J.J. Yeley	Imitrex / GSK (Joe Gibbs)	Chevrolet	250	125900	running	0	106
20	31	26	Jamie McMurray	Smirnoff Ice (Jack Roush)	Ford	250	136825	running	0	103
21	34	41	Reed Sorenson	Diet Pepsi / Target (Chip Ganassi)	Dodge	249	98175	running	8	105
22	30	66	Jeff Green	"According to Jim" / Best Buy (Gene Haas)	Chevrolet	249	113783	running	0	97
23	29	21	Ken Schrader	U.S. Air Force (Wood Brothers)	Ford	249	117289	running	0	94
24	21	16	Greg Biffle	National Guard / Charter Communications (Jack Roush)	Ford	249	105650	running	0	91
25	13	01	Joe Nemechek	U.S. Army (Bobby Ginn)	Chevrolet	249	115070	running	0	88
26	28	43	Bobby Labonte	Cheerios / Betty Crocker (Petty Enterprises)	Dodge	249	124861	running	0	85
27	1	2	Kurt Busch	Miller Lite (Roger Penske)	Dodge	249	135918	running	11	87
28	41	22	Dave Blaney	Caterpillar (Bill Davis)	Dodge	249	101718	running	0	79
29	27	14	Sterling Marlin	Ginn Clubs & Resorts (Bobby Ginn)	Chevrolet	249	99108	running	0	76
30	17	4	Scott Wimmer	Lucas Oil / Forward Air (Larry McClure)	Chevrolet	248	87400	running	0	73
31	37	55	Michael Waltrip	NAPA Auto Parts (Doug Bawel)	Dodge	248	93897	running	0	70
32	20	38	David Gilliland	Pedigree (Yates Racing)	Ford	248	112208	running	0	67
33	12	12	Ryan Newman	Sony HDTV (Roger Penske)	Dodge	248	129658	running	0	64
34	43	32	Travis Kvapil	Tide / Downy (Cal Wells)	Chevrolet	248	85150	running	0	61
35	35	45	Kyle Petty	Schwan's Home Service (Petty Enterprises)	Dodge	247	92150	running	0	58
36	32	40	David Stremme	Coors Light (Chip Ganassi)	Dodge	247	92100	running	0	55
37	42	96	Tony Raines	DLP HDTV (Bill Saunders)	Chevrolet	247	84050	running	0	52
38	39	49	Kevin Lepage	LoansDepot.com (Beth Ann Morgenthau)	Dodge	247	84000	running	0	49
39	40	78	Kenny Wallace	Furniture Row Racing (Barney Visser)	Chevrolet	246	83940	running	0	46
40	26	44	Terry Labonte	GMAC (Rick Hendrick)	Chevrolet	246	83890	running	0	43
41	2	25	Brian Vickers	Garnier Fructis (Rick Hendrick)	Chevrolet	237	97340	running	0	40
42	23	00	Bill Elliott	Burger King (Michael Waltrip)	Chevrolet	224	83785	running	0	37
43	25	7	Robby Gordon	World Series of Poker (Robby Gordon)	Chevrolet	193	83201	transmission	0	34
Failed to qualify
POS	NAME	NBR	SPONSOR	OWNER	CAR					
44	Todd Kluever	06	3M Post-It	Jack Roush	Ford					
45	Kertus Davis	34	Oak Glove Co.	Bob Jenkins	Chevrolet					
46	Chad Chaffin	61	Oak Gloves / Embassy Suites	Jeff Stec	Dodge					
47	Bill Lester	23	Waste Management	Bill Davis	Dodge					

Previous race: 2006 Sharpie 500	Nextel Cup Series; 2006 season	Next race: 2006 Chevy Rock & Roll 400
