= Stanton Barrett Motorsports =

NASCAR team

- Owner(s): Stanton Barrett; Derrike Cope; Chris Lencheski (former); Jody Looney (former)
- Base: Thomasville, North Carolina
- Series: NASCAR O'Reilly Auto Parts Series
- Race drivers: 30. TBA / Baltazar Leguizamón, Stanton Barrett
- Manufacturer: Chevrolet
- Opened: 2001

Career
- Debut: Sprint Cup Series: 2005 Sharpie 500 (Bristol Motor Speedway); O'Reilly Auto Parts Series: 2001 South Carolina 200 (Darlington); Camping World Truck Series: 2015 Fred's 250 (Talladega)
- Latest race: Sprint Cup Series: 2006 Lenox Industrial Tools 300 (New Hampshire); O'Reilly Auto Parts Series: 2008 Hefty Odor Block 200 (Phoenix); Camping World Truck Series: 2015 Fred's 250 (Talladega)
- Races competed: Total: 96; Cup Series: 10; O'Reilly Auto Parts Series: 85; Truck Series: 1
- Drivers' Championships: Total: 0 Cup Series: 0 O'Reilly Auto Parts Series: 0 Truck Series: 0
- Race victories: Total: 0 Cup Series: 0 O'Reilly Auto Parts Series: 0 Truck Series: 0
- Pole positions: Total: 0 Cup Series: 0 O'Reilly Auto Parts Series: 0 Truck Series: 0

Stanton Barrett Motorsports (formerly known as Red Racing and SKI Motorsports) was an American professional stock car racing team that competed in the NASCAR O'Reilly Auto Parts Series, fielding the No. 30 Chevrolet Camaro for Baltazar Leguizamón, Myatt Snider, and other drivers in a partnership with Cope Family Racing, as well as in the Cube3 Architecture TA2 series in TransAm, with the #12 Ford Mustang, driven by Rafa Matos, the #19 Chevrolet Camaro, driven by Graham Jacobson, and the #88 Ford Mustang, driven by Stanton Barrett.

The Barrett–Cope Racing team is owned by driver and Hollywood stuntman Stanton Barrett and former NASCAR driver and 1990 Daytona 500 winner Derrike Cope.

Barrett is returning to NASCAR team ownership in 2026 after having last fielded a team in the Truck Series in 2015 as well as the NASCAR Cup Series in 2005, 2006 and 2008 as well as the O'Reilly Auto Parts Series (when it was known as the Busch Series and Nationwide Series) from 2001 to 2008.

== Sprint Cup Series ==
=== Car No. 50 history ===
Barrett fielded his own team in the Cup Series again in 2008 with new co-owner Chris Lencheski as SKI Motorsports. The team's No. 50 car failed to qualify in all four races they attempted: the Daytona 500, the Coca-Cola 600, the Brickyard 400 and the September race at Dover.

==== Car No. 50 results ====
Year	Driver	No.	Make	1	2	3	4	5	6	7	8	9	10	11	12	13	14	15	16	17	18	19	20	21	22	23	24	25	26	27	28	29	30	31	32	33	34	35	36	Owners	Pts
2008	Stanton Barrett	50	Chevy	DAY; DNQ	CAL	LVS	ATL	BRI	MAR	TEX	PHO	TAL	RCH	DAR	CLT; DNQ	DOV	POC	MCH	SON	NHA	DAY	CHI	IND; DNQ	POC	GLN	MCH	BRI	CAL	RCH	NHA	DOV; DNQ	KAN	TAL	CLT	MAR	ATL	TEX	PHO	HOM	54th	82

=== Car No. 95 history ===
Barrett started his own Cup team in 2005 following his release from Front Row Motorsports. The team made four races of the seven races it attempted with his best finish being a 41st at Bristol Motor Speedway in August driving the No. 95. In the 2006 season, SBM attempted 15 and made six races with a best finish of 33rd at Phoenix. The team ended the season with sponsorship from QualityMetric though a partnership with Ware Racing.

In 2007, Barrett did not field his No. 95 car in any races and returned to Ware to attempt the Daytona 500 in their No. 30 car as well as the Bristol Night Race for Front Row Motorsports in their No. 34 car, failing to qualify for both.

==== Car No. 95 results ====
Year	Driver	No.	Make	1	2	3	4	5	6	7	8	9	10	11	12	13	14	15	16	17	18	19	20	21	22	23	24	25	26	27	28	29	30	31	32	33	34	35	36	Owners	Pts
2005	Stanton Barrett	95	Chevy	DAY	CAL	LVS	ATL	BRI	MAR	TEX	PHO	TAL	DAR	RCH	CLT	DOV	POC	MCH	SON	DAY	CHI	NHA	POC	IND	GLN	MCH	BRI; 41	CAL	RCH; DNQ	NHA; DNQ	DOV; 43	TAL	KAN	CLT; DNQ	MAR; 43	ATL	TEX	PHO; 42	HOM	59th	214
2006	Stanton Barrett	95	Chevy	DAY; DNQ	CAL; 40	LVS; DNQ	ATL; DNQ	BRI; 39	MAR; 39	TEX; DNQ	PHO; 33	TAL; DNQ	RCH; DNQ	DAR; 40	CLT; DNQ	DOV; DNQ	POC; DNQ	MCH; Wth	SON; DNQ	DAY	CHI	NHA; 40	POC	IND	GLN	MCH	BRI	CAL	RCH	NHA	DOV	KAN	TAL	CLT	MAR	ATL	TEX	PHO	HOM	47th	539

== O'Reilly Auto Parts Series ==
=== Car No. 30 history ===
After attempting no Busch races in 2005 and making one in 2006, the team made a limited schedule in 2007, with Barrett making fifteen races in the No. 30 Chevrolet and getting a best finish of seventeenth three times. Danny O'Quinn and Jeff Fuller made one-race attempts for Barrett as well.

In 2008, Barrett began running the No. 30 car in majority of the season while Kenny Hendrick drove for one race at IRP.

Barrett returned to team ownership in the series, now the O'Reilly Auto Parts Series, eighteen years later in 2026 when he partnered with Cope Family Racing and their No. 70 car from 2025 was renumbered to the No. 30. On January 5, 2026, Argentinian driver Baltazar Leguizamón was announced as the team's first driver, running the races at COTA, Martinsville in the spring and Watkins Glen. He will share the car with Stanton Barrett, as well as with other drivers who have yet to be determined.

==== Car No. 30 results ====
Year	Driver	No.	Make	1	2	3	4	5	6	7	8	9	10	11	12	13	14	15	16	17	18	19	20	21	22	23	24	25	26	27	28	29	30	31	32	33	34	35	Owners	Pts
2007	Stanton Barrett	30	Chevy	DAY	CAL	MXC; 40	LVS	ATL	BRI; 17	NSH	TEX; 33	PHO	TAL	RCH	DAR; 42	CLT; 29	DOV	NSH; 38	KEN	MLW	NHA; 27	DAY	CHI; 31	GTY; 20		CGV; 17	GLN	MCH	BRI	CAL; 19	RCH	DOV; 17	KAN	CLT; 24	MEM; 19	TEX; 38	PHO; 30	HOM	40th	1312
2007	Danny O'Quinn Jr.	30	Chevy																						IRP; 22														40th	1312
2008	Stanton Barrett	30	Chevy	DAY; 38	CAL	LVS; 11	ATL	BRI; 25	NSH	TEX; 27	PHO	MXC; 30	TAL	RCH	DAR; 19	CLT; 35	DOV; 21	NSH; 17	KEN; 25	MLW; 17	NHA; 33	DAY; 26	CHI; 35	GTY; 24		CGV; 25	GLN; 26	MCH; 21	BRI; 20	CAL; 21	RCH; 25	DOV; 27	KAN; 34	CLT; 28	MEM; DNQ	TEX; 24	PHO; 26	HOM; DNQ	32nd	2388
2008	Kenny Hendrick	30	Chevy																						IRP; 34														32nd	2388
2026	Carson Ware	30	Chevy	DAY; 19																																				
2026	Cody Ware	30	Chevy		ATL; 31																																			
2026	Baltazar Leguizamón	30	Chevy			COA; 37																																		
2026	Austin J. Hill	30	Chevy				PHO; 34																																	
2026	Myatt Snider	30	Chevy					LVS; DNQ	DAR; 33	MAR; 19	CAR	BRI	KAN	TAL	TEX	GLN	DOV	CLT	NSS	POC	COR	SON	CHI	ATL	IND	IOW	DAY	DAR	GTW	BRI	LVS	CLT	PHO	TAL	MAR	HOM				
2026	Stanton Barrett	30	Chevy																																					

=== Car No. 31 history ===
In 2007, SBR used the No. 31 as a companion car for the team. Kenny Hendrick made the most starts in the car, while Fuller and Shane Huffman also made brief appearances in the car. The team merged into Rick Ware Racing in 2009.

==== Car No. 31 results ====
Year	Driver	No.	Make	1	2	3	4	5	6	7	8	9	10	11	12	13	14	15	16	17	18	19	20	21	22	23	24	25	26	27	28	29	30	31	32	33	34	35	Owners	Pts
2007	Jeff Fuller	31	Chevy	DAY	CAL	MXC	LVS	ATL	BRI	NSH	TEX	PHO	TAL	RCH	DAR	CLT	DOV	NSH	KEN	MLW	NHA	DAY	CHI	GTY	IRP	CGV	GLN	MCH	BRI	CAL; 38	RCH	DOV	KAN	CLT	MEM	TEX	PHO	HOM	79th	49
2008	Kenny Hendrick	31	Chevy	DAY	CAL	LVS	ATL	BRI	NSH	TEX	PHO	MXC; 38	TAL	RCH	DAR; 36	CLT	DOV; 40	NSH; 40	KEN; 34	MLW; DNQ	NHA; 40		CHI; 40	GTY; 36	IRP		GLN; DNQ	MCH; 43	BRI	CAL; 37	RCH; 40	DOV; 41	KAN; 39	CLT	MEM; QL^{†}	TEX; DNQ	PHO; DNQ	HOM; 39	44th	958
2008	Shane Huffman	31	Chevy																			DAY; 41																	44th	958
2008	Jeff Fuller	31	Chevy																							CGV; 36													44th	958
2008	Stanton Barrett	31	Chevy																																MEM; 34				44th	958
^{†} - Qualified but replaced by Stanton Barrett

=== Car No. 34 history ===
In 2008, SKI fielded the No. 34 for Kenny Hendrick at Bristol. He failed to qualify for the race.

==== Car No. 34 results ====
Year	Driver	No.	Make	1	2	3	4	5	6	7	8	9	10	11	12	13	14	15	16	17	18	19	20	21	22	23	24	25	26	27	28	29	30	31	32	33	34	35	Owners	Pts
2008	Kenny Hendrick	34	Chevy	DAY	CAL	LVS	ATL	BRI	NSH	TEX	PHO	MXC	TAL	RCH	DAR	CLT	DOV	NSH	KEN	MLW	NHA	DAY	CHI	GTY	IRP	CGV	GLN	MCH	BRI; DNQ	CAL	RCH	DOV	KAN	CLT	MEM	TEX	PHO	HOM		

=== Car No. 61 history ===
In 2008, SBR fielded the No. 61 car for Stan Barrett at Montreal and Watkins Glen.

==== Car No. 61 results ====
Year	Team	No.	Make	1	2	3	4	5	6	7	8	9	10	11	12	13	14	15	16	17	18	19	20	21	22	23	24	25	26	27	28	29	30	31	32	33	34	35	NNSC	Pts
2008	Stan Barrett	61	Chevy	DAY	CAL	LVS	ATL	BRI	NSH	TEX	PHO	MXC	TAL	RCH	DAR	CLT	DOV	NSH	KEN	MLW	NHA	DAY	CHI	GTY	IRP	CGV; 39	GLN; 33	MCH	BRI	CAL	RCH	DOV	KAN	CLT	MEM	TEX	PHO	HOM	29th	2638

=== Car No. 91 history ===
The team began in 2001 as Red Racing (with co-owner Jody Looney) in the NASCAR Busch Series fielding the No. 91 Bojangles'/Odoban Chevrolet. The team ran twelve races in 2002, with a top finish of 21st at Nashville and Charlotte. The team returned again in 2003 after Stanton's release from Roush Racing for seven races and ran various manufacturers. The team would only end up finishing one race and that would be in the 30th position at Charlotte. For the 2004 season the team returned to the Busch Series as Stanton Barrett Racing for 16 races. The team ran Pontiac's and Chevrolet's throughout the season and received most of the sponsorship from AmericInn Lodging Systems. At the Meijer 300 the team fielded two cars, one for Shawna Robinson and one for Stanton Barrett, however only Barrett would qualify for the race. SBR would have a best finish of 18th at both the Milwaukee Mile and Richmond.

==== Car No. 91 results ====
Year	Driver	No.	Make	1	2	3	4	5	6	7	8	9	10	11	12	13	14	15	16	17	18	19	20	21	22	23	24	25	26	27	28	29	30	31	32	33	34	35	Owners	Pts
2001	Stanton Barrett	91	Chevy	DAY	CAR	LVS	ATL	DAR	BRI	TEX	NSH	TAL	CAL	RCH	NHA	NZH	CLT	DOV	KEN	MLW	GLN	CHI	GTY	PPR	IRP	MCH	BRI	DAR; 20	RCH	DOV; 27	KAN; 28	CLT; 39	MEM; 38	PHO	CAR	HOM			62nd	277
2002	Stanton Barrett	91	Chevy	DAY	CAR	LVS	DAR	BRI	TEX	NSH	TAL	CAL	RCH	NHA	NZH	CLT; DNQ	DOV	NSH; 21	KEN; 43	MLW	DAY		GTY; 28	PPR; 27	IRP			DAR; 24	RCH					ATL; 34					43rd	958
2002	Stanton Barrett	91	Ford																			CHI; 20				MCH; 33	BRI			DOV; 23	KAN	CLT; 21	MEM; 22		CAR; 42	PHO	HOM; DNQ		43rd	958
2003	Eddy McKean	91	Ford	DAY	CAR	LVS; 39																																	37th	1475
2003	Ron Barfield Jr.	91	Ford				DAR; 21	BRI							NZH; 32		DOV; 39			MLW; 41			NHA; 30																37th	1475
2003	Andy Belmont	91	Pontiac						TEX; 42	TAL																													37th	1475
2003	Jeff Fuller	91	Pontiac								NSH; 18																												37th	1475
2003	Jason Hedlesky	91	Pontiac									CAL; DNQ									DAY; DNQ																		37th	1475
2003	Kenny Hendrick	91	Pontiac										RCH; DNQ	GTY; 21		CLT; DNQ																							37th	1475
2003	Kenny Hendrick	91	Chevy															NSH; 35	KEN; 27																				37th	1475
2003	Stanton Barrett	91	Pontiac																			CHI; 34		PPR; 42								CLT; 30				CAR; 40	HOM		37th	1475
2003	Jimmy Kitchens	91	Chevy																						IRP; 37	MCH; 43	BRI; 43												37th	1475
2003	Stanton Barrett	91	Chevy																								BRI; QL^{†}		RCH; 38		KAN; DNQ		MEM; 42		PHO; 41				37th	1475
2003	Dan Pardus	91	Chevy																									DAR; DNQ											37th	1475
2003	Martin Truex Jr.	91	Chevy																											DOV; 13									37th	1475
2003	Jeff Fuller	91	Chevy																															ATL; DNQ					37th	1475
2004	Stanton Barrett	91	Pontiac	DAY; DNQ	CAR; QL^{‡}	LVS	DAR	BRI; 42		NSH; 41	TAL	CAL; DNQ	GTY; 42	RCH	NZH	CLT	DOV	NSH		MLW; 18	DAY		NHA; 33						RCH; 18				MEM; 42	ATL	PHO	DAR	HOM		44th	1159
2004	Kenny Wallace	91	Pontiac		CAR; 16																																		44th	1159
2004	Stanton Barrett	91	Chevy						TEX; 38													CHI; DNQ		PPR; 38	IRP	MCH; 20	BRI; 22	CAL		DOV; 37	KAN; 26	CLT; 32							44th	1159
2004	Shawna Robinson	91	Pontiac																KEN; DNQ																				44th	1159
^{†} - Qualified for Jimmy Kitchens ·^{‡} - Qualified for Kenny Wallace

=== Car No. 93 history ===
In 2008, SKI fielded the No. 93 for Kenny Hendrick at Charlotte. He failed to qualify for the race.

==== Car No. 93 results ====
Year	Driver	No.	Make	1	2	3	4	5	6	7	8	9	10	11	12	13	14	15	16	17	18	19	20	21	22	23	24	25	26	27	28	29	30	31	32	33	34	35	Owners	Pts
2008	Kenny Hendrick	93	Chevy	DAY	CAL	LVS	ATL	BRI	NSH	TEX	PHO	MXC	TAL	RCH	DAR	CLT	DOV	NSH	KEN	MLW	NHA	DAY	CHI	GTY	IRP	CGV	GLN	MCH	BRI	CAL	RCH	DOV	KAN	CLT; DNQ	MEM	TEX	PHO	HOM		

=== Car No. 95 history ===
In 2006, SBR fielded the No. 95 car for Stanton Barrett at Memphis and Phoenix.

==== Car No. 95 results ====
Year	Team	No.	Make	1	2	3	4	5	6	7	8	9	10	11	12	13	14	15	16	17	18	19	20	21	22	23	24	25	26	27	28	29	30	31	32	33	34	35	NNSC	Pts
2006	Stanton Barrett	95	Chevy	DAY	CAL	MXC	LVS	ATL	BRI	TEX	NSH	PHO	TAL	RCH	DAR	CLT	DOV	NSH	KEN	MLW	DAY	CHI	NHA	MAR	GTY	IRP	GLN	MCH	BRI	CAL	RCH	DOV	KAN	CLT	MEM; DNQ	TEX	PHO; 26	HOM	71st	113

=== Car No. 97 history ===
In 2003, SBR fielded the No. 97 car part-time for multiple drivers such as Kenny Hendrick, Jimmy Kitchens, Jeff Spraker, and Jeff Fuller.

In 2004, the No. 97 car returned in part-time basis with multiple drivers such as Kitchens, Barrett, Jason Schuler, Josh Richeson, and Ron Barfield Jr.

==== Car No. 97 results ====
Year	Team	No.	Make	1	2	3	4	5	6	7	8	9	10	11	12	13	14	15	16	17	18	19	20	21	22	23	24	25	26	27	28	29	30	31	32	33	34	35	NNSC	Pts
2003	Kenny Hendrick	97	Pontiac	DAY	CAR	LVS	DAR	BRI	TEX	TAL	NSH	CAL	RCH	GTY	NZH	CLT	DOV; 41																						56th	484
2003	Jimmy Kitchens	97	Pontiac															NSH; 40	KEN; 43	MLW	DAY	CHI		PPR; 33	IRP	MCH	BRI												56th	484
2003	Jeff Spraker	97	Pontiac																				NHA; 41																56th	484
2003	Jimmy Kitchens	97	Chevy																									DAR; DNQ	RCH; DNQ										56th	484
2003	Jeff Fuller	97	Chevy																											DOV; 41	KAN; 43	CLT; 43	MEM; 40	ATL	PHO; DNQ	CAR; 43	HOM		56th	484
2004	Jimmy Kitchens	97	Chevy	DAY	CAR	LVS	DAR	BRI	TEX	NSH; DNQ	TAL	CAL	GTY	RCH	NZH	CLT	DOV	NSH																					79th	161
2004	Stanton Barrett	97	Chevy																KEN; 37																				79th	161
2004	Jason Schuler	97	Chevy																	MLW; 42	DAY	CHI																	79th	161
2004	Josh Richeson	97	Chevy																				NHA; 42																79th	161
2004	Ron Barfield Jr.	97	Ford																					PPR; DNQ	IRP	MCH	BRI	CAL	RCH	DOV	KAN	CLT	MEM	ATL	PHO	DAR	HOM		79th	161

== Camping World Truck Series ==
=== Truck No. 91 history ===
The team returned in 2015, making their Truck Series debut with Barrett driving the No. 91 Chevrolet Silverado sponsored by Navy Seals vs. Zombies at Talladega.

==== Truck No. 91 results ====
Year	Driver	No.	Make	1	2	3	4	5	6	7	8	9	10	11	12	13	14	15	16	17	18	19	20	21	22	23	Owners	Pts
2015	Stanton Barrett	91	Chevy	DAY	ATL	MAR	KAN	CLT	DOV	TEX	GTW	IOW	KEN	ELD	POC	MCH	BRI	MSP	CHI	NHA	LVS	TAL; 29	MAR	TEX	PHO	HOM	55th	15
