= 1991 Hardee's 500 =

29th race of the 1991 NASCAR Winston Cup Series

Race details
- Race 29 of 29 in the 1991 NASCAR Winston Cup Series
- The 1991 Hardee's 500 program cover, featuring Dale Earnhardt.
- Date: November 17, 1991
- Official name: 32nd Annual Hardee's 500
- Location: Hampton, Georgia, Atlanta Motor Speedway
- Course: Permanent racing facility
- Course length: 1.522 miles (2.449 km)
- Distance: 328 laps, 499.216 mi (803.41 km)
- Scheduled distance: 328 laps, 499.216 mi (803.41 km)
- Average speed: 137.968 miles per hour (222.038 km/h)
- Attendance: 125,000

Pole position
Driver	Bill Elliott	Melling Racing
- Time: 30.793

Most laps led
Driver	Mark Martin	Roush Racing
- Laps: 190

Winner
No. 6	Mark Martin	Roush Racing

Television in the United States
- Network: ESPN
- Announcers: Bob Jenkins, Ned Jarrett, Benny Parsons

Radio in the United States
- Radio: Motor Racing Network

The 1991 Hardee's 500 was the 29th and final stock car race of the 1991 NASCAR Winston Cup Series and the 32nd iteration of the event. The race was held on Sunday, November 17, 1991, before an audience of 125,000 in Hampton, Georgia, at Atlanta Motor Speedway, a 1.522 miles (2.449 km) permanent asphalt quad-oval intermediate speedway. The race took the scheduled 328 laps to complete. At race's end, Roush Racing driver Mark Martin would manage to dominate the majority of the race to take his fifth career NASCAR Winston Cup Series victory and his only victory of the season.

By starting the race, Richard Childress Racing driver Dale Earnhardt would clinch his fifth NASCAR Winston Cup Series championship. With the championship, he was two championships away from tying Richard Petty for the record of the most NASCAR Winston Cup Series championships, with Petty having seven.

== Background ==
The layout of Atlanta Motor Speedway, the circuit where the race was held.

Atlanta Motor Speedway (formerly Atlanta International Raceway) is a 1.522-mile race track in Hampton, Georgia, United States, 20 miles (32 km) south of Atlanta. It has annually hosted NASCAR Winston Cup Series stock car races since its inauguration in 1960.

The venue was bought by Speedway Motorsports in 1990. In 1994, 46 condominiums were built over the northeastern side of the track. In 1997, to standardize the track with Speedway Motorsports' other two intermediate ovals, the entire track was almost completely rebuilt. The frontstretch and backstretch were swapped, and the configuration of the track was changed from oval to quad-oval, with a new official length of 1.54-mile (2.48 km) where before it was 1.522-mile (2.449 km). The project made the track one of the fastest on the NASCAR circuit.

=== Entry list ===
- (R) - denotes rookie driver.

#	Driver	Team	Make
0	Delma Cowart	H. L. Waters Racing	Ford
1	Rick Mast	Precision Products Racing	Oldsmobile
2	Rusty Wallace	Penske Racing South	Pontiac
3	Dale Earnhardt	Richard Childress Racing	Chevrolet
4	Ernie Irvan	Morgan–McClure Motorsports	Chevrolet
5	Ricky Rudd	Hendrick Motorsports	Chevrolet
6	Mark Martin	Roush Racing	Ford
7	Alan Kulwicki	AK Racing	Ford
8	Rick Wilson	Stavola Brothers Racing	Buick
9	Bill Elliott	Melling Racing	Ford
10	Derrike Cope	Whitcomb Racing	Chevrolet
11	Geoff Bodine	Junior Johnson & Associates	Ford
12	Hut Stricklin	Bobby Allison Motorsports	Buick
13	Kerry Teague	Linro Motorsports	Buick
15	Morgan Shepherd	Bud Moore Engineering	Ford
17	Darrell Waltrip	Darrell Waltrip Motorsports	Chevrolet
19	Chad Little	Little Racing	Ford
21	Dale Jarrett	Wood Brothers Racing	Ford
22	Sterling Marlin	Junior Johnson & Associates	Ford
24	Kenny Wallace	Team III Racing	Pontiac
25	Ken Schrader	Hendrick Motorsports	Chevrolet
26	Brett Bodine	King Racing	Buick
28	Davey Allison	Robert Yates Racing	Ford
30	Michael Waltrip	Bahari Racing	Pontiac
33	Harry Gant	Leo Jackson Motorsports	Oldsmobile
35	Bill Venturini	Venturini Motorsports	Chevrolet
36	H. B. Bailey	Bailey Racing	Pontiac
41	Larry Pearson	Larry Hedrick Motorsports	Chevrolet
42	Kyle Petty	SABCO Racing	Pontiac
43	Richard Petty	Petty Enterprises	Pontiac
47	Greg Sacks	Close Racing	Oldsmobile
49	Stanley Smith (R)	BS&S Motorsports	Buick
52	Mike Wallace	Jimmy Means Racing	Pontiac
53	Bobby Hillin Jr.	Team Ireland	Chevrolet
55	Ted Musgrave (R)	U.S. Racing	Pontiac
59	Mark Gibson	Gibson Racing	Pontiac
66	Randy LaJoie	Cale Yarborough Motorsports	Pontiac
68	Bobby Hamilton (R)	TriStar Motorsports	Oldsmobile
71	Dave Marcis	Marcis Auto Racing	Chevrolet
75	Joe Ruttman	RahMoc Enterprises	Oldsmobile
89	Jim Sauter	Mueller Brothers Racing	Pontiac
90	Wally Dallenbach Jr. (R)	Donlavey Racing	Ford
94	Terry Labonte	Hagan Racing	Oldsmobile
95	Eddie Bierschwale	Sadler Brothers Racing	Chevrolet
98	Jimmy Spencer	Travis Carter Enterprises	Chevrolet

== Qualifying ==
Qualifying was split into two rounds. The first round was held on Friday, November 15, at 2:00 PM EST. Each driver would have one lap to set a time. During the first round, the top 20 drivers in the round would be guaranteed a starting spot in the race. If a driver was not able to guarantee a spot in the first round, they had the option to scrub their time from the first round and try and run a faster lap time in a second round qualifying run, held on Saturday, November 16, at 10:30 AM EST. As with the first round, each driver would have one lap to set a time. For this specific race, positions 21-40 would be decided on time, and depending on who needed it, a select amount of positions were given to cars who had not otherwise qualified but were high enough in owner's points; up to two were given. If needed, a past champion who did not qualify on either time or provisionals could use a champion's provisional, adding one more spot to the field.

Bill Elliott, driving for Melling Racing, won the pole, setting a time of 30.793 and an average speed of 177.937 mph (286.362 km/h) in the first round.

Five drivers would fail to qualify.

=== Full qualifying results ===
Pos.	#	Driver	Team	Make	Time	Speed
1	9	Bill Elliott	Melling Racing	Ford	30.793	177.937
2	11	Geoff Bodine	Junior Johnson & Associates	Ford	30.984	176.840
3	4	Ernie Irvan	Morgan–McClure Motorsports	Chevrolet	31.055	176.435
4	6	Mark Martin	Roush Racing	Ford	31.057	176.424
5	3	Dale Earnhardt	Richard Childress Racing	Chevrolet	31.123	176.050
6	28	Davey Allison	Robert Yates Racing	Ford	31.260	175.278
7	30	Michael Waltrip	Bahari Racing	Pontiac	31.270	175.222
8	7	Alan Kulwicki	AK Racing	Ford	31.297	175.071
9	33	Harry Gant	Leo Jackson Motorsports	Oldsmobile	31.352	174.764
10	21	Dale Jarrett	Wood Brothers Racing	Ford	31.392	174.541
11	22	Sterling Marlin	Junior Johnson & Associates	Ford	31.411	174.436
12	42	Kyle Petty	SABCO Racing	Pontiac	31.435	174.303
13	25	Ken Schrader	Hendrick Motorsports	Chevrolet	31.473	174.092
14	98	Jimmy Spencer	Travis Carter Enterprises	Chevrolet	31.532	173.766
15	10	Derrike Cope	Whitcomb Racing	Chevrolet	31.532	173.766
16	68	Bobby Hamilton (R)	TriStar Motorsports	Oldsmobile	31.578	173.513
17	94	Terry Labonte	Hagan Racing	Oldsmobile	31.581	173.497
18	12	Hut Stricklin	Bobby Allison Motorsports	Buick	31.588	173.458
19	55	Ted Musgrave (R)	U.S. Racing	Pontiac	31.600	173.392
20	19	Chad Little	Little Racing	Ford	31.625	173.255
Failed to lock in Round 1
21	53	Bobby Hillin Jr.	Team Ireland	Chevrolet	31.442	174.264
22	17	Darrell Waltrip	Darrell Waltrip Motorsports	Chevrolet	31.512	173.877
23	26	Brett Bodine	King Racing	Buick	31.539	173.728
24	2	Rusty Wallace	Penske Racing South	Pontiac	31.698	172.856
25	15	Morgan Shepherd	Bud Moore Engineering	Ford	31.709	172.796
26	49	Stanley Smith (R)	BS&S Motorsports	Buick	31.715	172.764
27	71	Dave Marcis	Marcis Auto Racing	Chevrolet	31.733	172.666
28	1	Rick Mast	Precision Products Racing	Oldsmobile	31.748	172.584
29	5	Ricky Rudd	Hendrick Motorsports	Chevrolet	31.749	172.579
30	43	Richard Petty	Petty Enterprises	Pontiac	31.786	172.378
31	24	Kenny Wallace	Team III Racing	Pontiac	31.790	172.356
32	8	Rick Wilson	Stavola Brothers Racing	Buick	31.812	172.237
33	41	Larry Pearson	Larry Hedrick Motorsports	Chevrolet	31.838	172.096
34	66	Randy LaJoie	Cale Yarborough Motorsports	Pontiac	31.948	171.504
35	47	Greg Sacks	Close Racing	Oldsmobile	31.949	171.498
36	52	Mike Wallace	Jimmy Means Racing	Pontiac	32.045	170.985
37	95	Eddie Bierschwale	Sadler Brothers Racing	Chevrolet	32.125	170.559
38	89	Jim Sauter	Mueller Brothers Racing	Pontiac	32.142	170.469
39	90	Wally Dallenbach Jr. (R)	Donlavey Racing	Ford	32.216	170.077
Failed to qualify
40	75	Joe Ruttman	RahMoc Enterprises	Chevrolet	32.224	170.035
41	35	Bill Venturini	Venturini Motorsports	Chevrolet	-*	-*
42	0	Delma Cowart	H. L. Waters Racing	Ford	-*	-*
43	36	H. B. Bailey	Bailey Racing	Pontiac	-*	-*
44	13	Kerry Teague	Linro Motorsports	Buick	-*	-*
45	59	Mark Gibson	Gibson Racing	Pontiac	-*	-*
Official first round qualifying results
Official starting lineup

== Race results ==
Fin	St	#	Driver	Team	Make	Laps	Led	Status	Pts	Winnings
1	4	6	Mark Martin	Roush Racing	Ford	328	190	running	185	$88,950
2	3	4	Ernie Irvan	Morgan–McClure Motorsports	Chevrolet	328	11	running	175	$39,025
3	1	9	Bill Elliott	Melling Racing	Ford	328	29	running	170	$36,950
4	9	33	Harry Gant	Leo Jackson Motorsports	Oldsmobile	328	10	running	165	$21,250
5	5	3	Dale Earnhardt	Richard Childress Racing	Chevrolet	328	39	running	160	$27,825
6	25	15	Morgan Shepherd	Bud Moore Engineering	Ford	328	5	running	155	$17,050
7	11	22	Sterling Marlin	Junior Johnson & Associates	Ford	327	0	running	146	$11,150
8	2	11	Geoff Bodine	Junior Johnson & Associates	Ford	327	3	running	147	$16,850
9	8	7	Alan Kulwicki	AK Racing	Ford	326	0	running	138	$16,000
10	22	17	Darrell Waltrip	Darrell Waltrip Motorsports	Chevrolet	326	4	running	139	$11,600
11	29	5	Ricky Rudd	Hendrick Motorsports	Chevrolet	326	0	running	130	$12,800
12	27	71	Dave Marcis	Marcis Auto Racing	Chevrolet	326	0	running	127	$9,675
13	18	12	Hut Stricklin	Bobby Allison Motorsports	Buick	325	0	running	124	$9,575
14	33	41	Larry Pearson	Larry Hedrick Motorsports	Chevrolet	324	0	running	121	$5,300
15	17	94	Terry Labonte	Hagan Racing	Oldsmobile	324	0	running	118	$9,750
16	10	21	Dale Jarrett	Wood Brothers Racing	Ford	324	0	running	115	$8,750
17	6	28	Davey Allison	Robert Yates Racing	Ford	324	24	running	117	$16,850
18	16	68	Bobby Hamilton (R)	TriStar Motorsports	Oldsmobile	323	1	running	114	$7,200
19	12	42	Kyle Petty	SABCO Racing	Pontiac	322	0	running	106	$11,650
20	40	75	Joe Ruttman	RahMoc Enterprises	Chevrolet	322	0	running	103	$8,800
21	20	19	Chad Little	Little Racing	Ford	320	0	running	100	$4,425
22	30	43	Richard Petty	Petty Enterprises	Pontiac	319	0	running	97	$7,425
23	31	24	Kenny Wallace	Team III Racing	Pontiac	319	0	running	94	$5,225
24	15	10	Derrike Cope	Whitcomb Racing	Chevrolet	318	0	engine	91	$12,525
25	26	49	Stanley Smith (R)	BS&S Motorsports	Buick	318	0	running	88	$4,375
26	35	47	Greg Sacks	Close Racing	Oldsmobile	310	0	engine	85	$3,975
27	37	95	Eddie Bierschwale	Sadler Brothers Racing	Chevrolet	310	0	running	82	$3,875
28	28	1	Rick Mast	Precision Products Racing	Oldsmobile	271	0	valve	79	$6,775
29	23	26	Brett Bodine	King Racing	Buick	269	0	valve	76	$6,575
30	19	55	Ted Musgrave (R)	U.S. Racing	Pontiac	257	2	overheating	78	$4,675
31	34	66	Randy LaJoie	Cale Yarborough Motorsports	Pontiac	244	0	valve	70	$6,225
32	21	53	Bobby Hillin Jr.	Team Ireland	Chevrolet	230	10	block	72	$6,375
33	32	8	Rick Wilson	Stavola Brothers Racing	Buick	207	0	valve	64	$6,075
34	24	2	Rusty Wallace	Penske Racing South	Pontiac	197	0	accident	61	$4,025
35	38	89	Jim Sauter	Mueller Brothers Racing	Pontiac	195	0	accident	58	$3,350
36	39	90	Wally Dallenbach Jr. (R)	Donlavey Racing	Ford	173	0	engine	55	$3,325
37	13	25	Ken Schrader	Hendrick Motorsports	Chevrolet	86	0	accident	52	$5,945
38	14	98	Jimmy Spencer	Travis Carter Enterprises	Chevrolet	71	0	head	49	$5,915
39	36	52	Mike Wallace	Jimmy Means Racing	Pontiac	69	0	accident	46	$3,300
40	7	30	Michael Waltrip	Bahari Racing	Pontiac	26	0	accident	43	$5,275
Official race results

== Standings after the race ==
Drivers' Championship standings

	Pos	Driver	Points
	1	Dale Earnhardt	4,287
1	2	Ricky Rudd	4,092 (-195)
1	3	Davey Allison	4,088 (-199)
	4	Harry Gant	3,985 (–302)
	5	Ernie Irvan	3,925 (–362)
	6	Mark Martin	3,914 (–373)
	7	Sterling Marlin	3,839 (–448)
1	8	Darrell Waltrip	3,711 (–576)
1	9	Ken Schrader	3,690 (–597)
	10	Rusty Wallace	3,582 (–705)
Official driver's standings

- Note: Only the first 10 positions are included for the driver standings.

Previous race: 1991 Pyroil 500	NASCAR Winston Cup Series; 1991 season	Next race: 1992 Daytona 500
