= Jimmy Kitchens =

American racing driver (born 1962)

- Born: April 26, 1962 (age 64); Hueytown, Alabama, U.S.

NASCAR O'Reilly Auto Parts Series career
- 47 races run over 8 years
- 2005 position: 104th
- Best finish: 43rd (2002, 2004)
- First race: 1994 Kroger 200 (IRP)
- Last race: 2005 Aaron's 312 (Talladega)
Wins	Top tens	Poles
0	1	0

NASCAR FedEx Freight Truck Series career
- 1 race run over 1 year
- Best finish: 97th (2000)
- First race: 2000 Daytona 250 (Daytona)
Wins	Top tens	Poles
0	0	0
- Statistics up to date as of February 25, 2012.

Jimmy Kitchens (born April 26, 1962) is an American former stock car racing driver. He participated in both the Busch Series as well as the Craftsman Truck Series. In 1998, he became part of the famed Alabama Gang. He was employed at Stewart Haas Racing as Ryan Newman's spotter.

== Racing career ==
=== Craftsman Truck Series ===
In 2000, Kitchens made his first and only career start in the Craftsman Truck Series at Daytona International Speedway. After qualifying his No. 42 Dodge Motorsports Chevrolet 25th on the grid, Kitchens led three laps, but was later involved in an accident, prompting him to finish 28th.

=== Busch Series ===
Kitchens added seven of starts in 2003, but only finished one race at Chicagoland, where he finished 24th. He start and parked for the other six races, and failed to qualify for four others.

== Motorsports career results ==
=== NASCAR ===
(key) (Bold – Pole position awarded by qualifying time. Italics – Pole position earned by points standings or practice time. * – Most laps led.)

==== Busch Series ====
NASCAR Busch Series results
Year	Team	No.	Make	1	2	3	4	5	6	7	8	9	10	11	12	13	14	15	16	17	18	19	20	21	22	23	24	25	26	27	28	29	30	31	32	33	34	35	NBSC	Pts	Ref
1994	Bobby Allison Motorsports	82	Ford	DAY	CAR	RCH	ATL	MAR	DAR	HCY	BRI	ROU	NHA	NZH	CLT	DOV	MYB	GLN	MLW	SBO	TAL	HCY	IRP; 27	MCH	BRI	DAR	RCH	DOV	CLT	MAR	CAR								89th	82	
1996	Bobby Jones Racing	50	Ford	DAY; DNQ	CAR; 41	RCH; DNQ	ATL	NSV	DAR	BRI	HCY	NZH	CLT	DOV	SBO	MYB	GLN	MLW	NHA	TAL	IRP	MCH	BRI	DAR	RCH	DOV	CLT	CAR	HOM										105th	40	
1998	Washington-Erving Motorsports	50	Ford	DAY	CAR	LVS	NSV	DAR	BRI	TEX	HCY	TAL	NHA	NZH	CLT	DOV	RCH	PPR; 32	GLN	MLW	MYB	CAL	SBO	IRP	MCH	BRI	DAR	RCH	DOV	CLT	GTY	CAR	ATL	HOM					112th	67	
1999	AllCar Racing	22	Chevy	DAY; 31	CAR; DNQ	LVS; DNQ	ATL; 30	DAR; DNQ	TEX; DNQ	NSV; 32	BRI; 29	TAL; 42	CAL; DNQ	NHA	RCH	NZH; 41																							72nd	363	
1999	Bobby Jones Racing	55	Pontiac														CLT; DNQ	DOV	SBO	GLN	MLW	MYB	PPR	GTY	IRP	MCH	BRI	DAR											72nd	363	
1999	Whitaker Racing	7	Chevy																										RCH; DNQ	DOV; DNQ	CLT	CAR	MEM	PHO	HOM				72nd	363	
2002	Means Racing	52	Ford	DAY	CAR	LVS	DAR	BRI	TEX	NSH; 42								NSH; 42	KEN																				43rd	981	
2002	Moy Racing	77	Ford								TAL; 7	CAL	RCH	NHA; 22	NZH; 34	CLT; 40	DOV			MLW; 24	DAY; 17	CHI; 36	GTY	PPR	IRP; 27	MCH; 32	BRI	DAR; 30	RCH; 41	DOV; 41	KAN	CLT	MEM	ATL	CAR				43rd	981	
2002	GIC-Mixon Motorsports	72	Chevy																																	PHO; DNQ			43rd	981	
2002	Weber Racing	84	Chevy																																		HOM; DNQ		43rd	981	
2003	Stanton Barrett Motorsports	97	Pontiac	DAY	CAR	LVS	DAR	BRI	TEX	TAL	NSH	CAL	RCH	GTY	NZH	CLT	DOV	NSH; 40	KEN; 43	MLW				PPR; 33															78th	318	
2003	Ken Alexander Racing	70	Chevy																		DAY; DNQ																		78th	318	
2003	Moy Racing	77	Ford																			CHI; 24	NHA																78th	318	
2003	Stanton Barrett Motorsports	91	Chevy																						IRP; 37	MCH; 43	BRI; 43												78th	318	
2003	Stanton Barrett Motorsports	97	Chevy																									DAR; DNQ	RCH; DNQ										78th	318	
2003	GIC-Mixon Motorsports	41	Chevy																											DOV; DNQ	KAN	CLT	MEM	ATL	PHO	CAR	HOM		78th	318	
2004	Davis Motorsports	0	Chevy	DAY; 33	CAR; 42	LVS; 40	DAR; 39	BRI	TEX																														43rd	901	
2004	Stanton Barrett Motorsports	97	Chevy							NSH; DNQ																													43rd	901	
2004	Jay Robinson Racing	39	Ford								TAL; 32	CAL	GTY	RCH																									43rd	901	
2004	Jay Robinson Racing	28	Ford												NZH; 43	CLT	DOV																						43rd	901	
2004	Moy Racing	77	Ford															NSH; 39	KEN; 27	MLW; 27	DAY; 41	CHI; DNQ	NHA; 29	PPR; 32	IRP; DNQ	MCH; 27	BRI; 37		RCH; DNQ	DOV; 41	KAN; DNQ	CLT; DNQ	MEM; DNQ	ATL; DNQ	PHO	DAR	HOM; DNQ		43rd	901	
2004	Moy Racing	07	Ford																									CAL; 40											43rd	901	
2005	Jay Robinson Racing	28	Ford	DAY	CAL	MXC	LVS	ATL	NSH	BRI	TEX	PHO; QL^{†}	TAL; 15	DAR	RCH	CLT	DOV	NSH	KEN	MLW	DAY	CHI	NHA	PPR	GTY	IRP	GLN	MCH	BRI	CAL	RCH	DOV	KAN	CLT	MEM	TEX	PHO	HOM	104th	118	
^{†} - Qualified but replaced by Derrike Cope

==== Craftsman Truck Series ====
NASCAR Craftsman Truck Series results
Year	Team	No.	Make	1	2	3	4	5	6	7	8	9	10	11	12	13	14	15	16	17	18	19	20	21	22	23	24	NCTC	Pts	Ref
2000	McCray Racing	42	Chevy	DAY; 28	HOM	PHO	MMR	MAR	PIR	GTY	MEM	PPR	EVG	TEX	KEN	GLN	MLW	NHA	NZH	MCH	IRP	NSV	CIC	RCH	DOV	TEX	CAL	97th	84	

==== Winston West Series ====
NASCAR Winston West Series results
Year	Team	No.	Make	1	2	3	4	5	6	7	8	9	10	11	12	13	14	NWWSC	Pts	Ref
1997	AllCar Racing	47	Ford	TUS	AMP	SON	TUS	MMR	LVS	CAL	EVG	POR	PPR	AMP	SON	MMR	LVS; 16	63rd	115	
1998	AllCar Racing	41	Ford	TUS	LVS	PHO	CAL; 10	HPT	MMR	AMP	POR	CAL	PPR	EVG	SON	MMR	LVS	69th	134	
2003	Christina Adair	3	Pontiac	PHO; 8	LVS	CAL	MAD	TCR	EVG	IRW	S99	RMR	DCS	PHO	MMR			42nd	142	

=== ARCA Bondo/Mar-Hyde Series ===
(key) (Bold – Pole position awarded by qualifying time. Italics – Pole position earned by points standings or practice time. * – Most laps led.)

ARCA Bondo/Mar-Hyde Series results
Year	Team	No.	Make	1	2	3	4	5	6	7	8	9	10	11	12	13	14	15	16	17	18	19	20	21	22	ABSC	Pts	Ref
1997	AllCar Racing	47	Ford	DAY; 23	ATL; 34	SLM	CLT; 20	CLT; 8	POC; 19	MCH; 5	SBS	TOL	KIL	FRS	MIN	POC; 21	MCH; 9	DSF	GTW	SLM	WIN	CLT; 38	TAL; 21	ISF	ATL; 9	NA	-	
1998	AllCar Racing	47	Ford	DAY; 16	ATL; 15	SLM	CLT; 40	MEM	MCH	POC	SBS	TOL	PPR										CLT; 12	TAL; 12	ATL; 6	NA	-	
1998	Doc Watson	34	Ford											POC; 33	KIL	FRS	ISF	ATL	DSF	SLM	TEX	WIN				NA	-	
1999	ML Motorsports	67	Chevy	DAY; 12	ATL; 24	SLM	AND	CLT	MCH; 37	POC; 6	TOL; 11	SBS; 14	BLN; 31	POC; 31	KIL	FRS	FLM	ISF	WIN	DSF	SLM					26th	1370	
1999	AllCar Racing	47	Pontiac																			CLT; 25	TAL	ATL		26th	1370	
