= Jimmy Means Racing =

American stock car racing team

- Owner: Jimmy Means
- Base: Forest City, North Carolina
- Series: Xfinity Series
- Manufacturer: Chevrolet
- Opened: 1978
- Closed: 2022

Career
- Debut: Cup Series: 1978 Daytona 500 (Daytona); Xfinity Series: 2001 Aaron's 312 (Atlanta)
- Latest race: Cup Series: 2012 Quaker State 400 (Kentucky); Xfinity Series: 2022 Drive for the Cure 250 (Charlotte)
- Races competed: 923
- Drivers' Championships: 0
- Race victories: 0
- Pole positions: 0

Jimmy Means Racing was an American professional stock car racing team that last competed in the NASCAR Xfinity Series, having last fielded the No. 52 Chevrolet Camaro part-time for Harrison Rhodes, Gar Robinson, and Brennan Poole. It was owned by former driver Jimmy Means, who was the team's primary driver upon the team's founding in 1978 as a Winston Cup team known as Means Racing.

== History ==
=== Cup Series ===
After 44 starts driving for Bill Gray (and one for Rod Osterlund), Means made his debut as an owner in 1978 when he fielded the No. 52 Chevrolet. He had two top-tens and finished sixteenth in points. He expanded to a multi-car team briefly, fielding the No. 25 for Charlie Chamblee at Nashville, the No. 53 for Cecil Gordon at North Wilkesboro Speedway, and the No. 50 for Baxter Price at Texas World Speedway. His best years driving his car were from 1980 to 1983, when he finished no worse than 18th in the standings and had an average finish of 20th or better in all 4 seasons.

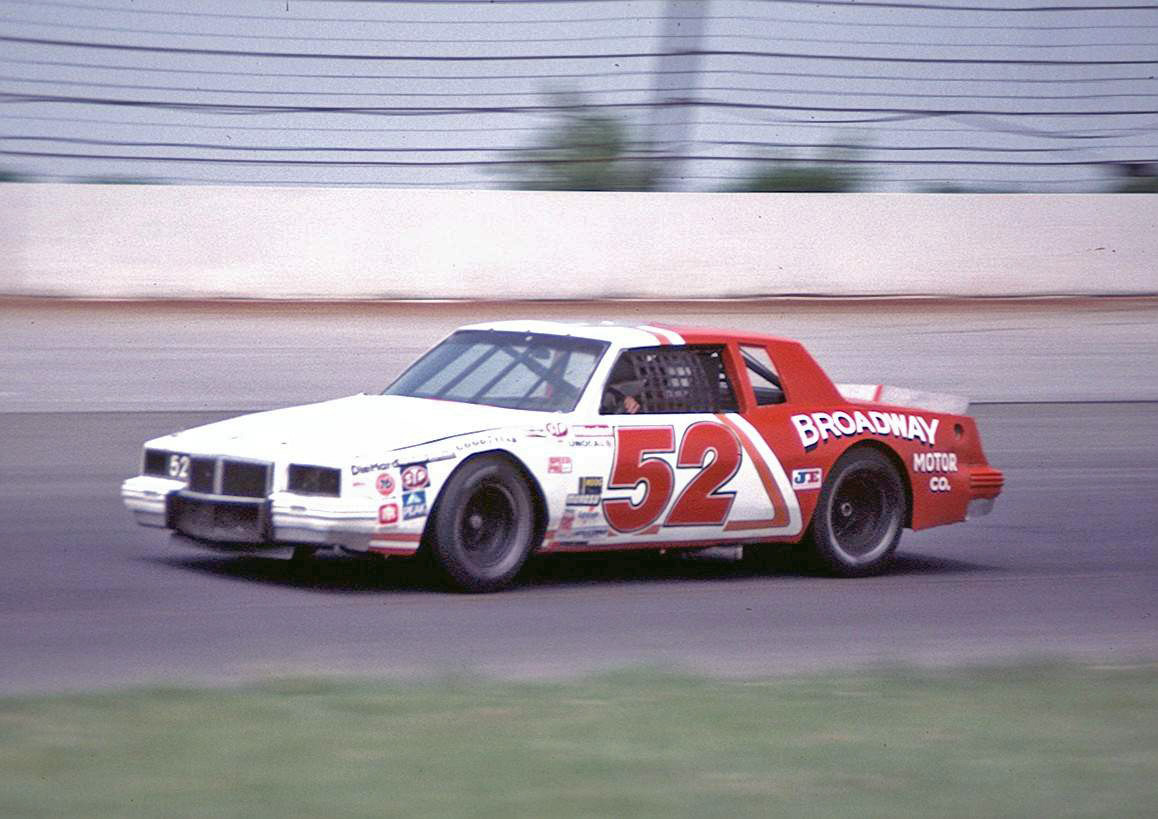
Means at Pocono in 1985

While remaining the primary driver of his car, in 1983, he stepped aside for Lennie Pond at Michigan International Speedway, who finished 22nd. In 1984, Means was injured and was replaced by Dale Jarrett, Sterling Marlin, Morgan Shepherd, Roy Smith and Bobby Wawak, and Means drove the No. 52 solely for the next six years. In 1991, Means gave up the No. 52 on two occasions; Bobby Hillin Jr. drove at Dover and Sears Point (finishing 19th and 21st), and Mike Wallace (finishing 31st and 39th) at Phoenix and Atlanta. In the early 1990s he frequently handed the wheel over to other drivers, including Hillin Jr, road racing ace Tommy Kendall; future IRL champion Scott Sharp; and future Craftsman Truck Series champ Mike Skinner. He also fielded occasional second entries for other drivers, including John McFadden, Mike Potter, and Brad Teague.

Means secured new sponsorship from NAPA for the 1993 season, but he was injured at Daytona. His temporary replacement was new NASCAR Rookie of the Year Jimmy Hensley. Means returned to finish 22nd at Atlanta. In what proved to be his final year as a driver, he was later 16th in the spring race at Bristol, 18th in Bristol's fall race, and 17th at Dover in September before his final race at Rockingham that fall. Besides Means' performances, the team's best result was 25th at Rockingham in February by Hensley. In 1994, the team's primary driver was Brad Teague, whose best finish in 8 starts was 22nd at Bristol in the summer. 4 other drivers competed once each in the No. 52 NAPA Ford in 1994. Mike Skinner finished 31st at Rockingham in February, Kirk Shelmerdine (former crew chief for Dale Earnhardt) was 26th at Talladega in May, Bob Keselowski was 41st at Pocono in June, and Gary Bradberry came home 30th in the season-ending Hooters 500 at Atlanta. In 1996, NAPA moved to the NASCAR Craftsman Truck Series to sponsor Ron Hornaday Jr. and therefore did not return to sponsor Means Racing. The team picked up some sponsorship from Advance Communications/Race Page, but failed to qualify in all of their attempts with Bradberry, Teague, and Randy MacDonald sharing the car. The team attempted every race to start the year but then scaled back to part-time after the numerous DNQs, only running at the fall Darlington race with Teague, but again failing to make the field. The team closed down in 1995.

==== Car No. 52 results ====
NASCAR Winston Cup Series results
Year	Driver	No.	Make	1	2	3	4	5	6	7	8	9	10	11	12	13	14	15	16	17	18	19	20	21	22	23	24	25	26	27	28	29	30	31	Owners	Pts
1978	Jimmy Means	52	Chevy	RSD	DAY; 35	RCH; 12	CAR; 10	ATL; 32	BRI; 23	DAR; 12	NWS; 14	MAR; 10	TAL	DOV; 17	CLT; 37	NSV; 30	RSD	MCH; 15	DAY; 13	NSV; 24	POC; 13	TAL; 32	MCH; 15	BRI; 19	DAR; 11	RCH; 13	DOV; 32	MAR; 23	NWS; 23	CLT	CAR; 13	ATL; 23	ONT; 22			
1979	Jimmy Means	52	Chevy	RSD	DAY; DNQ	CAR; 24	RCH; 27	ATL; 33	NWS; 30	BRI; 28	DAR; 30	MAR; 28	TAL; 12	NSV; 11	DOV; 31	CLT	TWS; 23	RSD; 31	MCH; 16	DAY; 22	NSV; 10	POC; 16	TAL; 13	MCH; 22	BRI; 19	DAR; 16	RCH; 20	DOV; 16	MAR; 17	CLT	NWS; 24	CAR; 31	ATL; 19	ONT		
1980	Jimmy Means	52	Chevy	RSD; 21		RCH; 30	CAR; 20	ATL; 12	BRI; 24	DAR; 28	NWS; 14	MAR; 12	TAL	NSV; 12	DOV; 27	CLT; 14	TWS; 19	RSD	MCH; 22		NSV; 16	POC; 14		MCH; 14	BRI; 22	DAR; 16	RCH; 13	DOV; 27	NWS; 12			CAR; 13	ATL; 20	ONT; 31		
1980	Jimmy Means	52	Buick		DAY; 15															DAY; 26			TAL; 15													
1981	Jimmy Means	52	Chevy	RSD; 18					BRI; 14	NWS; 14				NSV; 14	DOV; 9															NWS; 9	CLT					
1981	Jimmy Means	52	Pontiac		DAY; 21	RCH; 14	CAR; 29	ATL; 21			DAR; 23	MAR; 12	TAL; 27			CLT; 23	TWS; 19	RSD; 28	MCH; 28	DAY; 18		POC; 19	TAL; 16	MCH; 25	BRI; 12	DAR; 38	RCH; 16	DOV; 19	MAR; 15			CAR; 20	ATL; 35	RSD		
1981	Jimmy Means	52	Buick																		NSV; 15															
1982	Jimmy Means	52	Buick	DAY; 17			ATL; 16		DAR; 11	NWS; 18	MAR; 13	TAL; 9			CLT; 14	POC; 24	RSD; 18	MCH; 20	DAY; 21			TAL; 17	MCH; 11						CLT; 11							
1982	Jimmy Means	52	Chevy		RCH; 18	BRI; 16														NSV; 14				BRI; 14		RCH; 19				MAR; 9	CAR; 15	ATL; 13				
1982	Jimmy Means	52	Pontiac					CAR; 17					NSV; 23	DOV; 31							POC; 17				DAR; 23		DOV; 17	NWS; 14					RSD; 12			
1983	Jimmy Means	52	Buick	DAY; 14			ATL; 32				TAL; 7				CLT; 38			MCH; 21	DAY; 36																	
1983	Jimmy Means	52	Chevy		RCH; 16				NWS; 14	MAR; 10		NSV; 12		BRI; 14		RSD; 18	POC; 20			NSV; 12				BRI; 26	DAR; 20	RCH; 24	DOV; 21	MAR; 15	NWS; 22	CLT; 23	CAR; 9	ATL; 18	RSD; 16			
1983	Jimmy Means	52	Pontiac			CAR; 14		DAR; 12					DOV; 12								POC; 35	TAL														
1983	Lennie Pond	52	Chevy																				MCH; 22													
1984	Jimmy Means	52	Chevy	DAY; 17	RCH; 28				NWS; 25			TAL; 40	NSV; 22										MCH; 26			RCH; 18	DOV; 15									
1984	Jimmy Means	52	Pontiac			CAR; 13	ATL	BRI; 17		DAR; 14	MAR			DOV; 16	CLT; 27						POC; 25			BRI; 30	DAR; 18			MAR; 15	CLT; 19	NWS; 16	CAR; 18	ATL; 16	RSD; 21			
1984	Roy Smith	52	Pontiac													RSD; 26																				
1984	Bobby Wawak	52	Pontiac														POC; 28																			
1984	Slick Johnson	52	Pontiac															MCH; DNQ																		
1984	Dale Jarrett	52	Pontiac																DAY; 23																	
1984	Sterling Marlin	52	Pontiac																	NSV; 30																
1984	Morgan Shepherd	52	Chevy																			TAL; 30														
1985	Jimmy Means	52	Chevy	DAY; 14	RCH; 21		ATL; 28	BRI; 12				TAL; 12			RSD; 37			DAY; 32					DAR; 27													
1985	Jimmy Means	52	Pontiac			CAR; 30			DAR; 15	NWS; 17	MAR; 14		DOV; 30	CLT; 32		POC; 22	MCH; 35		POC; 23	TAL; 42	MCH; 15	BRI; 27		RCH; 23	DOV; 13	MAR; 13	NWS; 21	CLT; 38	CAR; 18	ATL; 41	RSD; 20					
1986	Jimmy Means	52	Pontiac	DAY; 39	RCH; 11	CAR; 19	ATL; 41	BRI; DNQ	DAR; 25	NWS; 20	MAR; 12		DOV; 24	CLT; DNQ	RSD; 22	POC; 22	MCH; DNQ	DAY; 24	POC; 13	TAL; 15	GLN; 21	MCH; 25	BRI; 27	DAR; 15	RCH; 26	DOV; 24	MAR; 22	NWS; 27	CLT; 18	CAR; 22	ATL; 29	RSD; 17				
1986	Jimmy Means	52	Chevy									TAL; 16																								
1987	Jimmy Means	52	Pontiac	DAY; 24	CAR; 22	RCH; 14	ATL; 32	DAR; 36	NWS; 30	BRI; 29	MAR; 14	TAL; 33	CLT; 15	DOV; 13	POC; 19	RSD; 23	MCH; DNQ				GLN; 19		BRI; 13		RCH; 9	DOV; 22	MAR; 30	NWS; 21	CLT	CAR; 20	RSD; 27	ATL; 29				
1987	Jimmy Means	52	Chevy															DAY; 29	POC; 38	TAL; 36		MCH; 37		DAR; 22												
1988	Jimmy Means	52	Chevy	DAY; 25	RCH; 24																															
1988	Jimmy Means	52	Pontiac			CAR; 40	ATL; 42	DAR; 35	BRI; 32	NWS; 30	MAR; DNQ	TAL; 23	CLT; 12	DOV; 27	RSD; 43	POC; 20	MCH; 36	DAY; 27	POC; 39	TAL; 23	GLN; 14	MCH; 38	BRI; DNQ	DAR; 24	RCH; 29	DOV; 19	MAR; 23	CLT; 42	NWS; DNQ	CAR; 39	PHO; 24	ATL; 38				
1989	Jimmy Means	52	Pontiac	DAY; DNQ	CAR; 33	ATL; 18	RCH; DNQ	DAR; 38	BRI; DNQ	NWS; 32	MAR; DNQ	TAL; 41	CLT; 41	DOV; 24	SON; DNQ	POC; 29	MCH; 28	DAY; 12	POC; 24	TAL; 39	GLN; 33	MCH; 27	BRI; DNQ	DAR; 26	RCH; 19	DOV; 21	MAR; 31	CLT; 37	NWS; 22	CAR; 31	PHO; 25	ATL; DNQ				
1990	Jimmy Means	52	Pontiac	DAY; 29	RCH; 18	CAR; 21	ATL; 31	DAR; 31	BRI; 29	NWS; 28	MAR; 19	TAL; 21	CLT; DNQ	DOV; 22	SON; DNQ	POC; 27	MCH; 39	DAY; 12	POC; 21	TAL; 30	GLN; 39	MCH; 27	BRI; 22	DAR; 36	RCH; 18	DOV; 24	MAR; 16	NWS; 30	CLT; 39	CAR; 28	PHO; 25	ATL; 28				
1991	Jimmy Means	52	Pontiac	DAY; 39	RCH; 31	CAR; 27	ATL; 31	DAR; 23	BRI; DNQ	NWS; DNQ	MAR; DNQ	TAL; 20	CLT; 38			POC; 26	MCH; 27	DAY; 26	POC; 21	TAL; 23	GLN; 39	MCH; 27	BRI; DNQ	DAR; 28	RCH; 35	DOV; 23	MAR; DNQ			CAR; 35						
1991	Jimmy Means	52	Olds																									NWS; 28	CLT; 24							
1991	Bobby Hillin Jr.	52	Pontiac											DOV; 19	SON; 21																					
1991	Mike Wallace	52	Pontiac																												PHO; 31	ATL; 39				
1992	Jimmy Means	52	Pontiac	DAY; DNQ	CAR; 33	RCH; 35	ATL; 38	DAR; 20		NWS; 32	MAR; 30	TAL; 34	CLT; 42	DOV; 31		POC; 35	MCH; 23	DAY; 39	POC; 39	TAL; 32		MCH; 39	BRI; 24	DAR; 22	RCH; 29	DOV; 23	MAR; DNQ	NWS; DNQ	CLT; 38	CAR; 26						
1992	Jimmy Means	52	Ford																													ATL; 21				
1992	Brad Teague	52	Pontiac						BRI; 21																											
1992	Tommy Kendall	52	Pontiac												SON; 13																					
1992	Scott Sharp	52	Chevy																		GLN; 19															
1992	Scott Gaylord	52	Pontiac																												PHO; 37					
1993	Jimmy Hensley	52	Ford	DAY; 40	CAR; 25	RCH; 34																														
1993	Jimmy Means	52	Ford				ATL; 22	DAR; 31	BRI; 16	NWS; 27	MAR; DNQ	TAL; 32		CLT; 38	DOV; 26	POC; 22	MCH; 28	DAY; 36	NHA; 34	POC; DNQ	TAL; 25		MCH; 25	BRI; 18		RCH; 26	DOV; 17	MAR; DNQ	NWS; DNQ		CAR; 29		ATL; DNQ			
1993	Scott Gaylord	52	Pontiac										SON; DNQ																							
1993	Scott Gaylord	52	Olds																			GLN; 29														
1993	Scott Gaylord	52	Ford																													PHO; DNQ				
1993	Mike Skinner	52	Ford																						DAR; 35											
1993	Mike Wallace	52	Ford																											CLT; 30						
1994	Brad Teague	52	Ford	DAY; DNQ				DAR; 24	BRI; DNQ					CLT; 41	DOV; 40		MCH; DNQ	DAY; DNQ	NHA	POC	TAL; 28	IND; DNQ	GLN	MCH; DNQ	BRI; 22	DAR; 30	RCH; DNQ	DOV; 40	MAR; 27	NWS; DNQ	CLT; DNQ	CAR; DNQ	PHO			
1994	Mike Skinner	52	Ford		CAR; 31	RCH	ATL			NWS; DNQ	MAR; DNQ																									
1994	Kirk Shelmerdine	52	Ford									TAL; 26																								
1994	Scott Gaylord	52	Ford										SON; DNQ																							
1994	Bob Keselowski	52	Ford													POC; 41																				
1994	Gary Bradberry	52	Ford																															ATL; 30		
1995	Gary Bradberry	52	Ford	DAY; DNQ	CAR; DNQ	RCH; DNQ	ATL; DNQ																													
1995	Brad Teague	52	Ford					DAR; DNQ	BRI; DNQ																	DAR; DNQ	RCH	DOV	MAR	NWS	CLT	CAR	PHO	ATL		
1995	Randy MacDonald	52	Ford							NWS; DNQ	MAR	TAL	SON	CLT	DOV	POC	MCH	DAY	NHA	POC	TAL	IND	GLN	MCH	BRI											

==== Car No. 53 results ====
NASCAR Winston Cup Series results
Year	Driver	No.	Make	1	2	3	4	5	6	7	8	9	10	11	12	13	14	15	16	17	18	19	20	21	22	23	24	25	26	27	28	29	30	31	Owners	Pts
1981	Cecil Gordon	53	Buick	RSD	DAY	RCH	CAR	ATL	BRI	NWS; 31	DAR	MAR	TAL	NSV	DOV	CLT	TWS	RSD	MCH	DAY	NSV	POC	TAL	MCH	BRI	DAR	RCH	DOV	MAR	NWS	CLT	CAR	ATL	RSD		
1992	John McFadden	53	Pontiac	DAY	CAR; 40	RCH	ATL	DAR; 37	BRI	NWS	MAR	TAL; 40	CLT											DAR; 38	RCH					CAR; 40	PHO	ATL				
1992	Graham Taylor	53	Pontiac											DOV; 40	SON	POC	MCH	DAY	POC	TAL	GLN	MCH	BRI			DOV; 39	MAR	NWS	CLT							
1993	Mike Potter	53	Ford	DAY	CAR	RCH	ATL	DAR; 38	BRI	NWS	MAR	TAL	SON	CLT	DOV																					
1993	Graham Taylor	53	Ford													POC; 40	MCH	DAY	NHA	POC	TAL	GLN	MCH	BRI												
1993	Jimmy Means	53	Ford																						DAR; 39	RCH	DOV	MAR	NWS	CLT	CAR	PHO	ATL			

In 2012, the team announced that they would be returning to the Cup Series for the first time since 1995, fielding the No. 52 Toyota part-time for Scott Speed and Mike Skinner in a partnership with Dell Hamilton, running as Hamilton Means Racing. After many problems acquiring equipment and preparing cars, Speed attempted Martinsville but didn't qualify. The team made their debut at Darlington. The team picked up some sponsorship from Crusader Staffing. Skinner start and parked the car in their first race after 20 laps. Skinner attempted again at Kentucky but did not qualify. In 2013, Means sold his owner points to Brian Keselowski Motorsports.

==== Car No. 52 results ====
NASCAR Sprint Cup Series results
Year	Driver	No.	Make	1	2	3	4	5	6	7	8	9	10	11	12	13	14	15	16	17	18	19	20	21	22	23	24	25	26	27	28	29	30	31	32	33	34	35	36	Owners	Pts
2012	Scott Speed	52	Toyota	DAY	PHO	LVS	BRI	CAL	MAR; DNQ																															57th	3
2012	Mike Skinner	52	Toyota							TEX	KAN	RCH	TAL	DAR; 41	CLT	DOV	POC	MCH	SON	KEN; DNQ	DAY	NHA	IND	POC	GLN	MCH	BRI	ATL	RCH	CHI	NHA	DOV	TAL	CLT	KAN	MAR	TEX	PHO	HOM	57th	3

=== Xfinity Series ===
==== Car No. 52 history ====
In 2001, Means Racing returned to NASCAR in the Busch Series with a partnership with Moy Racing. They began the season with Jason Rudd, who ran the first race for the team, and Brad Teague, who ran five races total for them that season, his best finish a 38th at Watkins Glen International. Gaylord also returned to run two races, both resulting in 42nd-place finishes. Kertus Davis, Ricky Sanders and Andy Kirby also drove for the team that year. In 2002, Teague drove eleven races for the team, his best finish 38th at Nazareth Speedway. Jimmy Kitchens, Phil Bonifield and Eric Jones drove part-time as well for the team that year. Teague made 11 starts for Means in 2003, with Donnie Neuenberger running an additional two races.

In 2004, Bruce Bechtel joined as another driver to the team. He made several attempts but only made one race, at Pikes Peak. Teague continued to run with the team, his best finish being a 26th at Bristol. The next season, Shane Hall was the team's original driver but was soon released. Eric McClure began running with the team, with a best finish of 30th at Texas Motor Speedway, but was released in favor of Neuenberger. At the Dover 200, Neuenberger flipped over the Plan B Technologies Ford Taurus on Lap 2. He was uninjured, but as that was the team's only car, the team did not run again for a year.

The No. 52 returned for the 2007 Orbitz 300 at Daytona but failed to qualify with Brad Teague at the wheel. Teague, Neuenberger, Kevin Lepage, Jamie Mosley and Ian Henderson had driven throughout the season, with Scott Gaylord driving at Montreal, Phoenix, and Watkins Glen. Chris Lawson attempted but did not qualify at Memphis. Neuenberger drove four races with Royal Farms' sponsorship.

Derrike Cope was the team's driver for the first part of 2008 season. At the Diamond Hill Plywood 200 at Darlington, Cope was replaced by Brad Teague. Teague finished 22nd, 4 laps down. Teague mostly drove the car in 2008, but Neuenberger sometimes raced with Lepage, Scott Gaylord, Tony Raines and Boris Said occasionally drove. The 2009 season in the nationwide series was up and down for Means racing, with very many drivers. They were a "start and park" operation and missed several races.

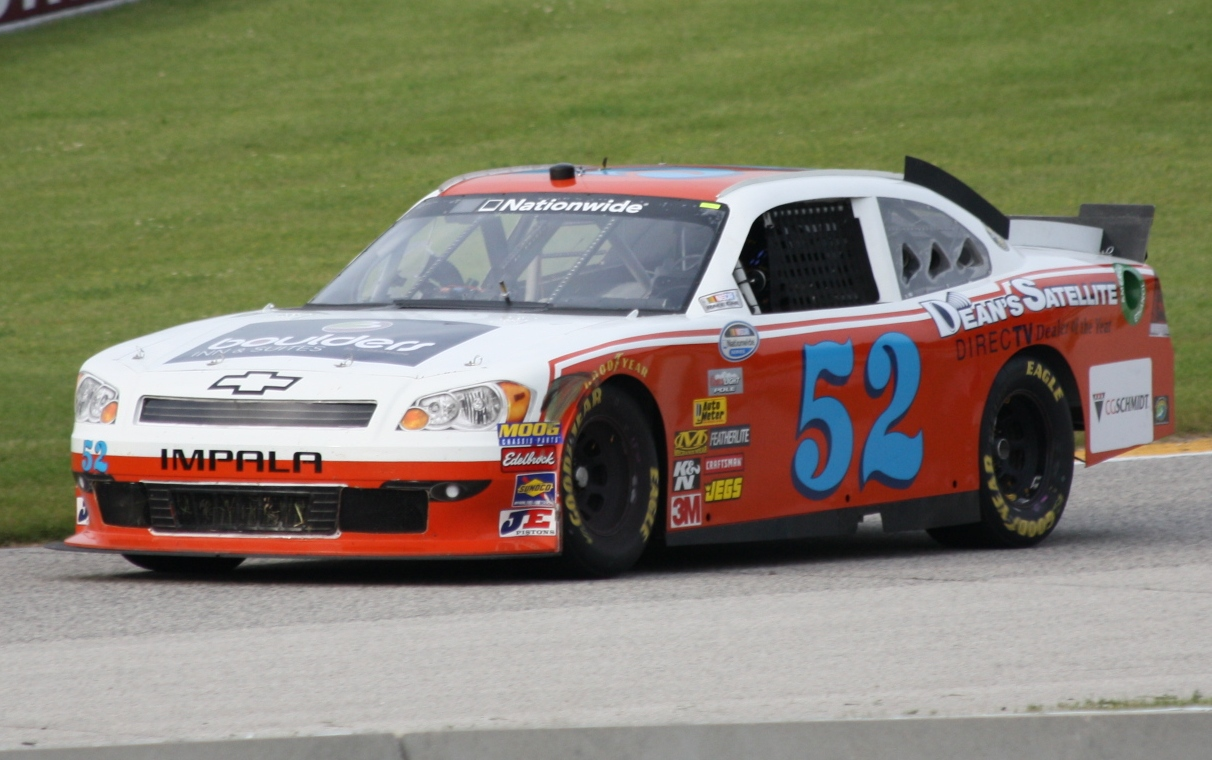
Tim Schendel at Road America in 2011

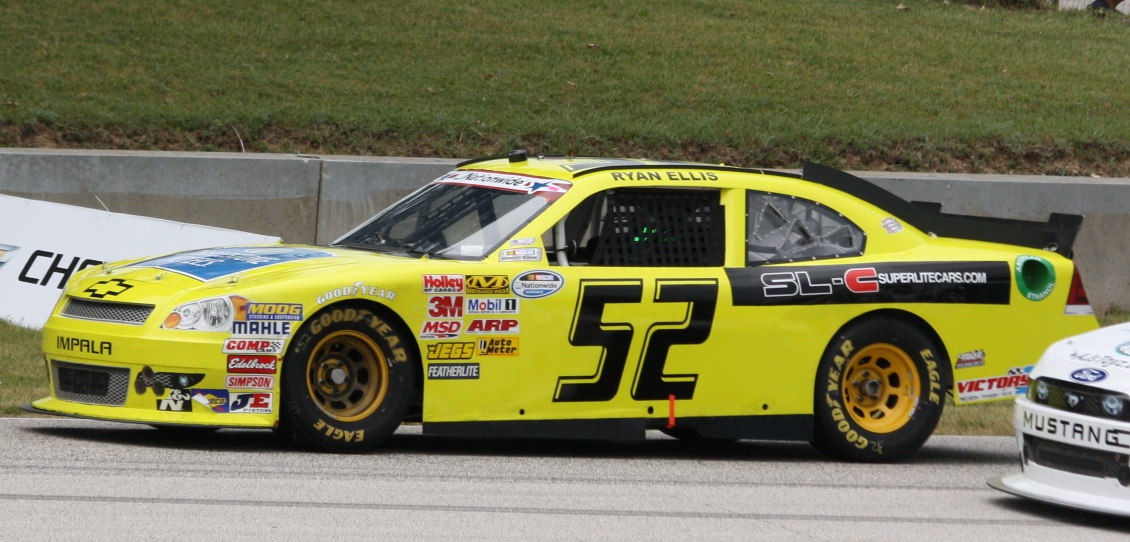
Ryan Ellis at Road America in 2012

For 2011, they returned to the Nationwide Series full-time in the No. 52 Chevy. Target Your Market Promotions and My 3 Sons Vending sponsored the team numerous times and continued to do so, off and on throughout the year. After Bobby Santos III took a hard hit during practice for the season opener in Daytona, Dale Earnhardt Jr. gave the team the No. 88 backup car, on the condition that Means Racing would run the whole race with the car, and not Start and Park. Means Racing did run the whole race, they would end up finishing 17th. Since Daytona, the team has run with several other drivers, including Daryl Harr, Tim Schendel, and Tony Raines.

For 2012, the team ran Daytona with driver former Cup driver Reed Sorenson, and then switched between drivers Tim Schendel, Kevin Lepage, Joey Gase, Justin Jennings and Ryan Ellis for one race. The team achieved a spot in the top-30, locking them into the first five races. The team's best finish was a 19th at Kansas with Gase.

In 2013, the No. 52 team mainly used driver Gase, for 18 total races. Means also used Donnie Neuenberger, Lepage, Schendel and Ellis each for one race. The year's best finish was also 19th, but this time at Talladega with driver Neuenberger. Toyotas were driven for 7 of the 22 races with Chevrolet cars used the other races.

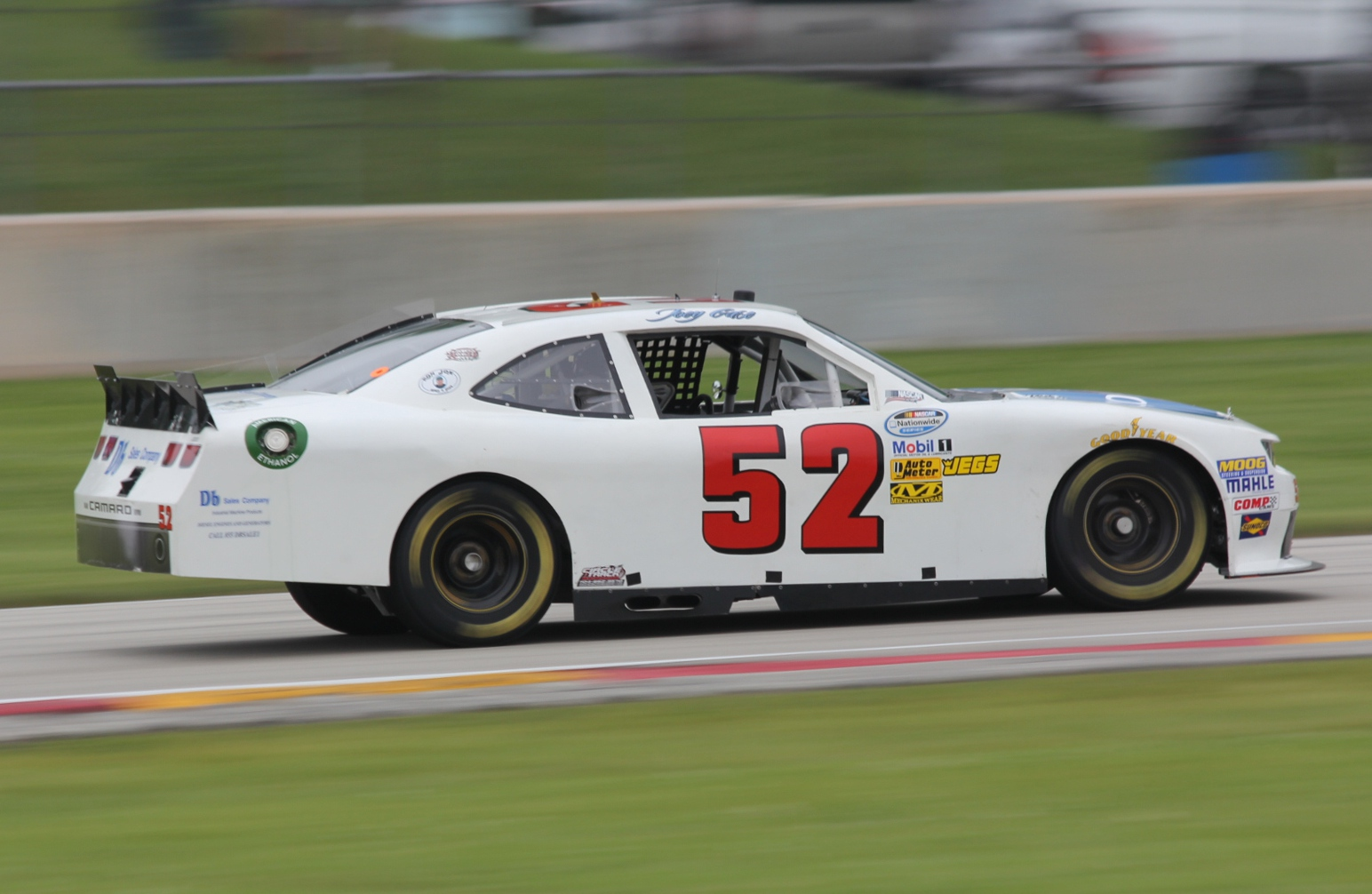
Joey Gase at Road America in 2014

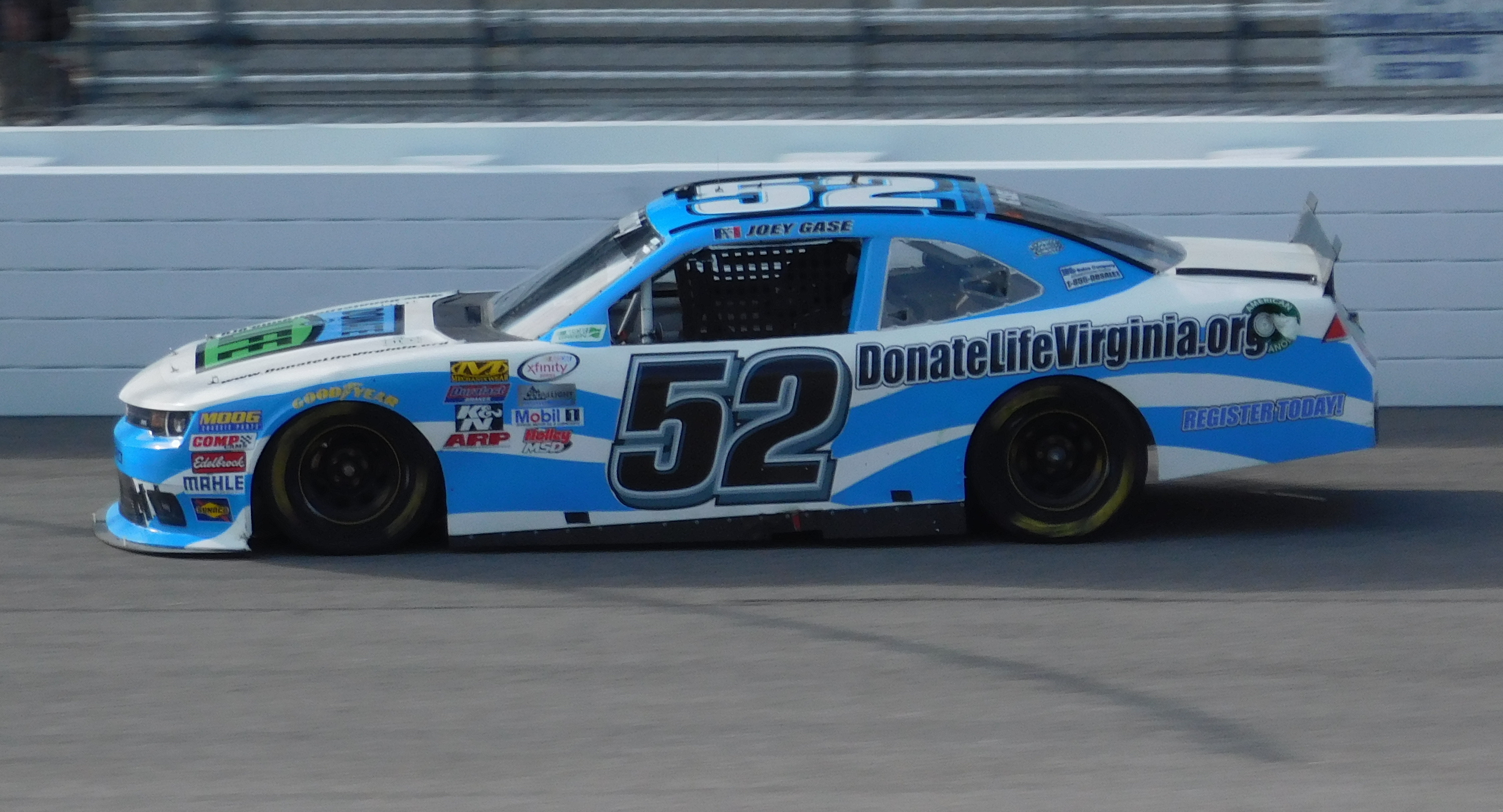
Gase at Richmond in April 2016

In 2014, Gase again served as the team's primary driver with a high finish of 11th at Talladega. Sponsors included Donate Life, DB Sales Company, and ASC.

In 2015, the team returned with Gase. At Talladega, Gase earned his first top 5 finish by finishing 5th and earned the team their first top 5 finish.

In 2016, they returned with Gase. At Talladega, Gase was involved in a hard crash with Chris Cockrum. He collected a best finish of 19th at Daytona (June). He finished again 21st in the standings.

In 2017, Gase started on a high note a 7th-place finish at Daytona.

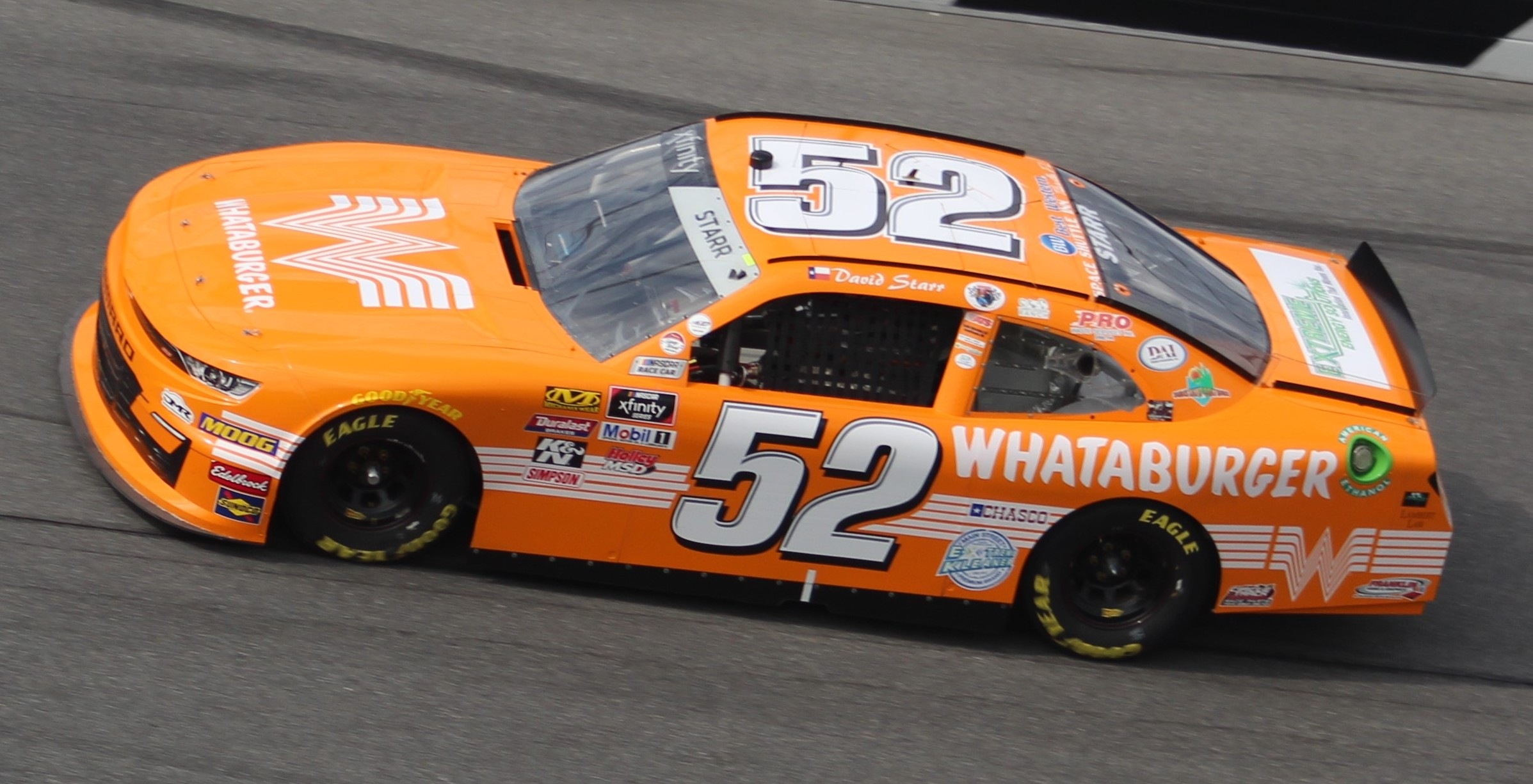
David Starr at Daytona in February 2019

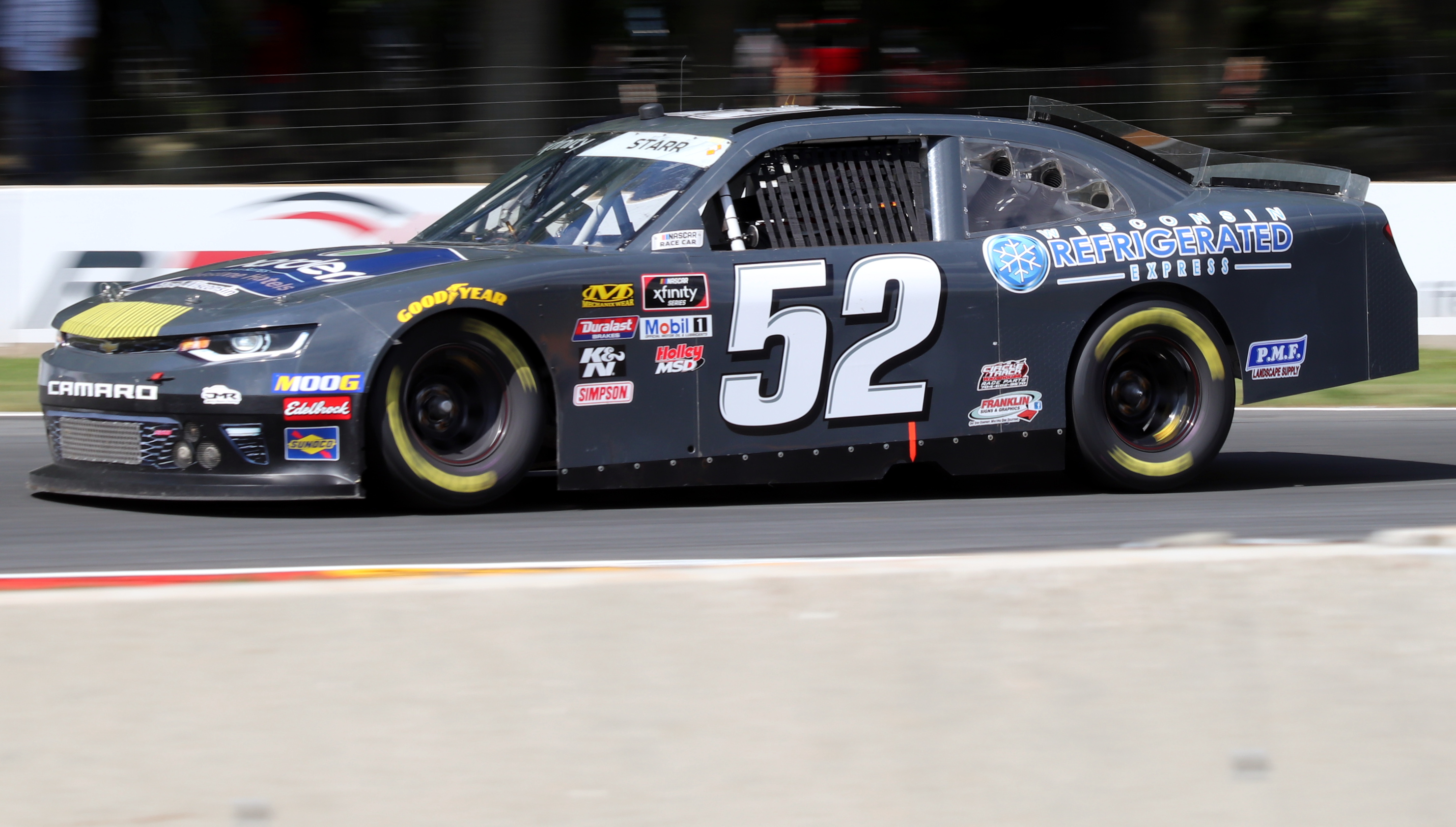
Starr at Road America in 2019

In 2018, Gase left JMR and moved to the Go Green/SS-Green Light Racing No. 35 car. The team would sign David Starr to replace him for the full season. He started the season with a 17th-place finish in the season-opener at Daytona. Starr continued to drive for the team in 2019.

Starr left for JD Motorsports in 2020 and was replaced by Kody Vanderwal, who ran all but the first three races of the season, which were run by J. J. Yeley. Due to the team needing more sponsorship, which Vanderwal did not bring to the team, he did not return in 2021.

In 2021 NASCAR Xfinity Series, Gray Gaulding, who brought his own sponsorship to the team, would replace Vanderwal in the No. 52. Gaulding entered 21 races and he failed to qualify 4 races. Gase would return with the team at Pocono, Talladega, Texas, Kansas, and season finale at Phoenix. At Talladega, the team fields a Ford that is owned by Gase himself instead of their usual Chevrolet. Gase failed to qualify at Phoenix. Spencer Boyd drove for the team at New Hampshire, Daytona, Charlotte Roval, and Martinsville. Dave Smith made starts with the team at Watkins Glen. Japanese driver Akinori Ogata drove for the team at Richmond. At Vegas, JMR lent their owner points to Rick Ware Racing so they could field a second car for Carson Ware.

In 2022, Harrison Rhodes attempted to qualify the No. 52 at Daytona, with plans the three west coast races at Auto Club, Las Vegas and Phoenix. The team ended up skipping the west coast swing due to a lack of sponsorship but returned at Atlanta. Gar Robinson would drive the No. 52 at Circuit of the Americas, but did not qualify. Rhodes returned for the race at Richmond, where he did not qualify, and Martinsville, which they did not qualify as well. Means' 52 team did not attempt a race until they had subsequent sponsorship. The team returned at Bristol with Brennan Poole, but they did not qualify, missing the race by just 0.023 seconds. Poole returned again at Charlotte Roval, but once again, they did not qualify. The team has not attempted a race in the series since.

==== Car No. 52 results ====
NASCAR Xfinity Series results
Year	Driver	No.	Make	1	2	3	4	5	6	7	8	9	10	11	12	13	14	15	16	17	18	19	20	21	22	23	24	25	26	27	28	29	30	31	32	33	34	35	Owners	Pts
2001	Jason Rudd	52	Ford	DAY	CAR; 40																								RCH; 31										47th	725
2001	Scott Gaylord	52	Ford			LVS; 42																		PPR; 42															47th	725
2001	Brad Teague	52	Ford				ATL; 43	DAR; 40	BRI; 32	TEX	NSH	TAL	CAL	RCH	NHA						GLN; 38	CHI								DOV; 41	KAN	CLT			CAR; 42	HOM			47th	725
2001	Kertus Davis	52	Ford													NZH; 35	CLT	DOV; 42	KEN	MLW; 40																			47th	725
2001	Eric Jones	52	Ford																				GTY; 39																47th	725
2001	Mike Potter	52	Ford																						IRP; 41	MCH	BRI												47th	725
2001	Ricky Sanders	52	Ford																									DAR; 41											47th	725
2001	Andy Kirby	52	Ford																														MEM; 41	PHO					47th	725
2002	Brad Teague	52	Ford	DAY	CAR; 41	LVS	DAR; 42	BRI; 43	TEX		TAL; 42		RCH; 42	NHA; 40	NZH; 38	CLT					DAY; 43	CHI	GTY	PPR; 42				DAR; 42	RCH							PHO; 43			46th	761
2002	Jimmy Kitchens	52	Ford							NSH; 42								NSH; 42	KEN																				46th	761
2002	Scott Gaylord	52	Ford									CAL; 40																											46th	761
2002	Phil Bonifield	52	Ford														DOV; 43			MLW; 42					IRP; 43	MCH	BRI												46th	761
2002	Donnie Neuenberger	52	Ford																											DOV; DNQ									46th	761
2002	Ryck Sanders	52	Ford																												KAN; DNQ								46th	761
2002	Cam Strader	52	Ford																													CLT; DNQ	MEM	ATL	CAR; DNQ		HOM		46th	761
2003	Brad Teague	52	Ford	DAY; DNQ						TAL; 33		CAL; DNQ	RCH								DAY; 42		NHA; 39		IRP; 40			DAR; QL^{‡}	RCH; 41		KAN; 41	CLT; DNQ	MEM; 37	ATL		CAR; DNQ	HOM		45th	1059
2003	Mike Potter	52	Ford		CAR; 42		DAR; 41	BRI; 41			NSH; 43			GTY; 40	NZH; 38	CLT	DOV; 43	NSH; 41	KEN; DNQ	MLW		CHI; 36				MCH; DNQ	BRI	DAR; 43											45th	1059
2003	Wayne Jacks	52	Ford			LVS; DNQ																																	45th	1059
2003	Donnie Neuenberger	52	Ford						TEX; 41																					DOV; 36									45th	1059
2003	Ryck Sanders	52	Ford																					PPR; 39															45th	1059
2003	Bruce Bechtel	52	Ford																																PHO; 42				45th	1059
2004	Bruce Bechtel	52	Ford	DAY	CAR	LVS; DNQ			TEX; DNQ	NSH	TAL	CAL	GTY	RCH										PPR; 34									MEM; DNQ	ATL					55th	660
2004	Brad Teague	52	Ford				DAR; 42	BRI; 26										NSH; 42	KEN; DNQ	MLW; 36	DAY	CHI	NHA; 40		IRP; DNQ	MCH	BRI; DNQ	CAL	RCH; 40	DOV; 40	KAN; DNQ	CLT; DNQ			PHO; DNQ	DAR; 43	HOM		55th	660
2004	Jason Rudd	52	Ford												NZH; 42	CLT	DOV																						55th	660
2005	Shane Hall	52	Ford	DAY; DNQ	CAL; DNQ		LVS; DNQ																																47th	988
2005	Scott Gaylord	52	Ford			MXC; QL																																	47th	988
2005	Jimmy Morales	52	Ford			MXC; 20																																	47th	988
2005	Stan Boyd	52	Ford					ATL; DNQ																															47th	988
2005	Eric McClure	52	Ford						NSH; 41		TEX; 30	PHO; 38		DAR; DNQ	RCH; DNQ	CLT; DNQ		NSH; 31		MLW; 34		CHI; DNQ	NHA; DNQ	PPR; 40	GTY; DNQ			MCH; DNQ		CAL; 39	RCH								47th	988
2005	Brad Teague	52	Ford							BRI; DNQ									KEN; DNQ										BRI; DNQ										47th	988
2005	Donnie Neuenberger	52	Ford										TAL; DNQ				DOV; 39				DAY; DNQ											DOV; 43	KAN	CLT	MEM	TEX	PHO	HOM	47th	988
2005	D. J. Hoelzle	52	Ford																							IRP; 31													47th	988
2005	Scott Turner	52	Ford																								GLN; DNQ												47th	988
2007	Brad Teague	52	Ford	DAY; DNQ	CAL	MXC	LVS	ATL	BRI; 40	NSH; 39								NSH; 42						GTY; 40	IRP; 42					CAL; 40	RCH								43rd	890
2007	Kevin Lepage	52	Ford								TEX; 42	PHO; 39		RCH; 42	DAR; DNQ	CLT																							43rd	890
2007	Donnie Neuenberger	52	Ford										TAL; 38				DOV; 39					DAY; 41	CHI									DOV; 25	KAN	CLT					43rd	890
2007	Jamie Mosley	52	Ford																KEN; 40																				43rd	890
2007	Ian Henderson	52	Ford																	MLW; 37	NHA; DNQ																		43rd	890
2007	Scott Gaylord	52	Ford																							CGV; 39	GLN; 40	MCH	BRI										43rd	890
2007	Chris Lawson	52	Ford																																MEM; DNQ	TEX	PHO	HOM	43rd	890
2008	Donnie Neuenberger	52	Chevy	DAY; DNQ									TAL; 14									DAY; 34						MCH; 31								TEX; 38			33rd	2255
2008	Donnie Neuenberger	52	Ford														DOV; 34																						33rd	2255
2008	Donnie Neuenberger	52	Dodge																													DOV; 43							33rd	2255
2008	Derrike Cope	52	Chevy		CAL; 36	LVS; 32	ATL; 37	BRI; 36	NSH; 40	TEX; 37	PHO; 35			RCH; 33																									33rd	2255
2008	Scott Gaylord	52	Ford									MXC; 42														CGV; 29													33rd	2255
2008	Scott Gaylord	52	Chevy																											CAL; 40			KAN; 29				PHO; 39		33rd	2255
2008	Brad Teague	52	Chevy												DAR; 22	CLT; 28		NSH; 27	KEN; 27	MLW; 30	NHA; 28		CHI; QL^{¤}	GTY; 23	IRP; 29				BRI; 32		RCH; 32							HOM; 40	33rd	2255
2008	Brad Teague	52	Ford																																MEM; 36				33rd	2255
2008	Kevin Lepage	52	Chevy																				CHI; 34																33rd	2255
2008	Boris Said	52	Ford																								GLN; 27												33rd	2255
2008	Tony Raines	52	Chevy																												RCH; QL^{±}			CLT; 26					33rd	2255
2009	Donnie Neuenberger	52	Chevy	DAY; 36							TAL; 28									DAY; 42																			44th	1293
2009	Scott Gaylord	52	Chevy		CAL; 32	LVS; 36																			GLN; DNQ														44th	1293
2009	Trevor Bayne	52	Chevy				BRI; 23																																44th	1293
2009	Kevin Lepage	52	Chevy					TEX; 33						CLT; DNQ	DOV; 35	NSH; 34	KEN; DNQ	MLW; DNQ	NHA; 39																				44th	1293
2009	Kevin Lepage	52	Ford										DAR; 35																										44th	1293
2009	Brad Teague	52	Chevy						NSH; DNQ													GTY; DNQ					BRI; 34				DOV; 32				MEM; DNQ	TEX			44th	1293
2009	Kevin Hamlin	52	Chevy							PHO; 41											CHI; DNQ											KAN; DNQ	CAL	CLT					44th	1293
2009	Kevin Hamlin	52	Ford									RCH; DNQ																											44th	1293
2009	Chris Lawson	52	Chevy																				IRP; 36							RCH; DNQ							PHO; DNQ	HOM	44th	1293
2009	Jack Smith	52	Chevy																					IOW; DNQ															44th	1293
2009	Mike Wallace	52	Chevy																							MCH; 34													44th	1293
2009	Tony Ave	52	Chevy																									CGV; 39	ATL; DNQ										44th	1293
2010	Donnie Neuenberger	52	Chevy	DAY; Wth	CAL	LVS					TAL; 38	RCH	DAR																		DOV; DNQ								52nd	430
2010	Chris Lawson	52	Ford				BRI; DNQ																																52nd	430
2010	Chris Lawson	52	Chevy													NSH; 40			NHA; DNQ	DAY	CHI	GTY; DNQ	IRP; 41				BRI; DNQ	CGV											52nd	430
2010	Tim Schendel	52	Chevy					NSH; DNQ	PHO	TEX														IOW; 40											GTY; DNQ				52nd	430
2010	Kevin Hamlin	52	Chevy											DOV; 41	CLT																								52nd	430
2010	Kenny Hendrick	52	Chevy														KEN; DNQ	ROA																					52nd	430
2010	Joey Scarallo	52	Chevy																						GLN; 38	MCH													52nd	430
2010	Kevin Lepage	52	Chevy																										ATL; 40	RCH		KAN; 40	CAL; 38	CLT		TEX; 42	PHO; DNQ	HOM; 41	52nd	430
2011	Bobby Santos III	52	Chevy	DAY; 17																																			31st	496
2011	Daryl Harr	52	Chevy		PHO; 39	LVS; 35									IOW; 24																								31st	496
2011	Tim Schendel	52	Chevy				BRI; 36		TEX; 35		NSH; 35								ROA; 25					IRP; 24	IOW; 27														31st	496
2011	Tony Raines	52	Chevy					CAL; 26										MCH; 42																					31st	496
2011	Danny Efland	52	Chevy							TAL; 21																													31st	496
2011	Kevin Lepage	52	Chevy									RCH; 34	DAR; 21	DOV; 38		CLT; 33	CHI; 28			DAY; 33	KEN; 29	NHA; 24	NSH; 28					BRI; 31	ATL; 30	RCH; 23		DOV; 27	KAN; 28	CLT; 27		PHO; 20	HOM; 35		31st	496
2011	Dan Clarke	52	Chevy																							GLN; 39													31st	496
2011	Louis-Philippe Dumoulin	52	Chevy																								CGV; 28												31st	496
2011	Blake Koch	52	Dodge																												CHI; 27								31st	496
2011	Jamie Dick	52	Chevy																																TEX; 31				31st	496
2012	Reed Sorenson	52	Chevy	DAY; 34																																			33rd	338
2012	Tim Schendel	52	Chevy		PHO; 30	LVS; 29	BRI; 37	CAL; 29	TEX; 27							MCH; 35					CHI; 33	IND; 28																	33rd	338
2012	Kevin Lepage	52	Chevy							RCH; 27	TAL; 43	DAR; 35						KEN; 36																					33rd	338
2012	Joey Gase	52	Chevy										IOW; 33	CLT; 25	DOV; 26				DAY; 37	NHA; 27						BRI; 31	ATL; 43	RCH; DNQ	CHI; 35	KEN; 35		CLT; DNQ	KAN; 19	TEX; 31	PHO; DNQ	HOM; 32			33rd	338
2012	Ryan Ellis	52	Chevy														ROA; 39							GLN; DNQ	CGV; DNQ														33rd	338
2012	Justin Jennings	52	Chevy																				IOW; 26								DOV; 32								33rd	338
2013	Joey Gase	52	Toyota	DAY; DNQ				CAL; 40						DOV; 34		MCH; 27	ROA; Wth				CHI; 40								CHI; 35				CLT; DNQ	TEX; 30					37th	262
2013	Joey Gase	52	Chevy		PHO; 30	LVS; 33	BRI; Wth		TEX; DNQ									KEN; 32	DAY; 36	NHA; 33		IND; DNQ	IOW; 26	GLN; 33		BRI; DNQ	ATL; 31	RCH; 32		KEN; 31	DOV; 29	KAN; DNQ			PHO; 29	HOM			37th	262
2013	Derek Thorn	52	Toyota							RCH; DNQ																													37th	262
2013	Donnie Neuenberger	52	Chevy								TAL; 19																												37th	262
2013	Kevin Lepage	52	Toyota									DAR; 35	CLT																										37th	262
2013	Tim Schendel	52	Chevy												IOW; 33																								37th	262
2013	Ryan Ellis	52	Chevy																						MOH; 38														37th	262
2014	Joey Gase	52	Chevy	DAY; 32	PHO; 24		BRI; 29	CAL; 26	TEX; 26	DAR; 26	RCH; 31	TAL; 11	IOW; 27		DOV; 23	MCH; 27	ROA; 30	KEN; 32	DAY; 37	NHA; 29	CHI; 31	IND; 31	IOW; 24	GLN; 36	MOH; 27	BRI; 32	ATL; 30	RCH; 28	CHI; 35	KEN; 28	DOV; 27	KAN; 32	CLT; 26	TEX; 37	PHO; 28	HOM; 39			30th	482
2014	Joey Gase	52	Toyota			LVS; 36								CLT; 34																									30th	482
2015	Joey Gase	52	Chevy	DAY; 32	ATL; 30	LVS; 27	PHO; 31	CAL; 30	TEX; 31	BRI; 25	RCH; 26	TAL; 5	IOW; 27	CLT; 32	DOV; 29	MCH; 27	CHI; 31	DAY; 30	KEN; 25	NHA; 28	IND; 26	IOW; 34	GLN; 31	MOH; 26	BRI; 27	ROA; 29	DAR; 30	RCH; 27	CHI; 28	KEN; 21	DOV; 24	CLT; 27	KAN; 28	TEX; 26	PHO; 25	HOM; 32			29th	545
2016	Joey Gase	52	Chevy	DAY; 32	ATL; 32	LVS; 28	PHO; 33	CAL; 28	TEX; 27	BRI; 31	RCH; 26	TAL; 38	DOV; 23	CLT; 36	POC; 23	MCH; 25	IOW; 25	DAY; 19	KEN; 27	NHA; 25	IND; 28	IOW; 24	GLN; 32	MOH; 28	BRI; 22	ROA; 22	DAR; 24	RCH; 27	CHI; 26	KEN; 31	DOV; 27	CLT; 32	KAN; 23	TEX; 31	PHO; 24	HOM; 37			27th	437
2017	Joey Gase	52	Chevy	DAY; 7	ATL; 31	LVS; 30	PHO; 35	CAL; 28	TEX; 26	BRI; 28	RCH; 20	TAL; 16	CLT; 23	DOV; 36	POC; 32	MCH; 25	IOW; 18	DAY; 10	KEN; 33	NHA; 25	IND; 30	IOW; 24	GLN; 29	MOH; 21	BRI; 27	ROA; 32	DAR; 28	RCH; 36	CHI; 27	KEN; 30	DOV; 28	CLT; 31	KAN; 30	TEX; 27	PHO; 33	HOM; 29			30th	336
2018	David Starr	52	Chevy	DAY; 17	ATL; 28	LVS; 35	PHO; 39	CAL; 26	TEX; 21	BRI; 24	RCH; 35	TAL; 32	DOV; 26	CLT; 20	POC; 20	MCH; 33	IOW; 24	CHI; 23	DAY; 35	KEN; 23	NHA; 28	IOW; 19	GLN; 33	MOH; 21	BRI; 21	ROA; 36	DAR; 36	IND; 18	LVS; 32	RCH; 20	ROV; 27	DOV; 24	KAN; 17	TEX; 24	PHO; 27	HOM; 28			28th	352
2019	David Starr	52	Chevy	DAY; 20	ATL; 27	LVS; 19	PHO; 27	CAL; 21	TEX; 20	BRI; 25	RCH; 29	TAL; 14	DOV; 28	CLT; 22	POC; 24	MCH; 25	IOW; 34	CHI; 36	DAY; 32	KEN; 21	NHA; 26	IOW; 31	GLN; 29	MOH; 33	BRI; 24	ROA; 17	DAR; 27	IND; 37	LVS; 26	RCH; 25	ROV; 34	DOV; 21	KAN; 23	TEX; 33	PHO; 25	HOM; 23			31st	364
2020	J. J. Yeley	52	Chevy	DAY; 12	LVS; 22	CAL; 25																																	35th	315
2020	Kody Vanderwal	52	Chevy				PHO; 29	DAR; 32	CLT; 35	BRI; 21	ATL; 37	HOM; 37	HOM; 33	TAL; 31	POC; 19	IRC; 28	KEN; 25	KEN; 29	TEX; 32	KAN; 27	ROA; 27	DRC; 23	DOV; 31	DOV; 27	DAY; 34	DAR; 29	RCH; 28	RCH; 29	BRI; 29	LVS; 31	TAL; 28	ROV; 20	KAN; 26	TEX; 21	MAR; 29	PHO; 22			35th	315
2021	Gray Gaulding	52	Chevy	DAY; 34	DRC; 21	HOM; 28	LVS; 27	PHO; 27	ATL; 36	MAR; 21	TAL; 34	DAR; 38	DOV; 31	COA; 27	CLT; DNQ	MOH; 17	TEX; 38	NSH; DNQ		ROA; DNQ	ATL; 35			IRC; DNQ	MCH; 27		DAR; 40		BRI; 18										39th	200
2021	Joey Gase	52	Chevy																POC; 36														TEX; 30	KAN; 40		PHO; DNQ			39th	200
2021	Joey Gase	52	Ford																												TAL; 15								39th	200
2021	Spencer Boyd	52	Chevy																			NHA; 33				DAY; 38						ROV; 31			MAR; 30				39th	200
2021	Dave Smith	52	Chevy																				GLN; 33																39th	200
2021	Akinori Ogata	52	Chevy																									RCH; 34											39th	200
2021	Carson Ware	52	Toyota																											LVS; 31									39th	200
2022	Harrison Rhodes	52	Chevy	DAY; DNQ	CAL	LVS	PHO	ATL; DNQ		RCH; DNQ	MAR; DNQ	TAL	DOV	DAR	TEX	CLT	PIR	NSH	ROA	ATL	NHA	POC	IRC	MCH	GLN	DAY	DAR	KAN											51st	0
2022	Gar Robinson	52	Chevy						COA; DNQ																														51st	0
2022	Brennan Poole	52	Chevy																										BRI; DNQ	TEX	TAL	ROV; DNQ	LVS	HOM	MAR	PHO			51st	0

==== Car No. 53 history ====
In 2019, Jimmy Means Racing fielded the No. 53 car, which was fielded for Max Tullman at Mid-Ohio and Kyle Weatherman at Dover in October, which they failed to finish both. The car did not attempt any races after that year.

==== Car No. 53 results ====
NASCAR Xfinity Series results
Year	Driver	No.	Make	1	2	3	4	5	6	7	8	9	10	11	12	13	14	15	16	17	18	19	20	21	22	23	24	25	26	27	28	29	30	31	32	33	Owners	Pts
2019	Max Tullman	53	Chevy	DAY	ATL	LVS	PHO	CAL	TEX	BRI	RCH	TAL	DOV	CLT	POC	MCH	IOW	CHI	DAY	KEN	NHA	IOW	GLN	MOH; 38	BRI	ROA	DAR	IND	LVS	RCH	ROV						49th	3
2019	Kyle Weatherman	53	Chevy																													DOV; 35	KAN	TEX	PHO	HOM	49th	3

==== Car No. 55 history ====
Jimmy Means Racing fielded the No. 55 car in 2008 as a backup for the 52. Brad Teague and Scott Gaylord raced for this team at Nashville and Phoenix respectively. Teague would also race this car at Dover. Chad Chaffin attempted to race at Milwaukee but didn’t qualify. Teague then attempted Bristol in 2009 with this car but did not qualify.

==== Car No. 55 results ====
NASCAR Nationwide Series results
Year	Driver	No.	Make	1	2	3	4	5	6	7	8	9	10	11	12	13	14	15	16	17	18	19	20	21	22	23	24	25	26	27	28	29	30	31	32	33	34	35	Owners	Pts
2008	Brad Teague	55	Ford	DAY	CAL	LVS	ATL	BRI	NSH; 41	TEX																													68th	148
2008	Brad Teague	55	Chevy														DOV; 37	NSH	KEN																				68th	148
2008	Scott Gaylord	55	Ford								PHO; 43	MXC	TAL	RCH	DAR	CLT																							68th	148
2008	Chad Chaffin	55	Ford																	MLW; DNQ	NHA	DAY	CHI	GTY	IRP	CGV	GLN	MCH	BRI	CAL	RCH	DOV	KAN	CLT	MEM	TEX	PHO	HOM	68th	148
2009	Brad Teague	55	Ford	DAY	CAL	LVS	BRI; DNQ	TEX	NSH	PHO	TAL	RCH	DAR	CLT	DOV	NSH	KEN	MLW	NHA	DAY	CHI	GTY	IRP	IOW	GLN	MCH	BRI	CGV	ATL	RCH	DOV	KAN	CAL	CLT	MEM	TEX	PHO	HOM	80th	25

==== Car No. 79 history ====
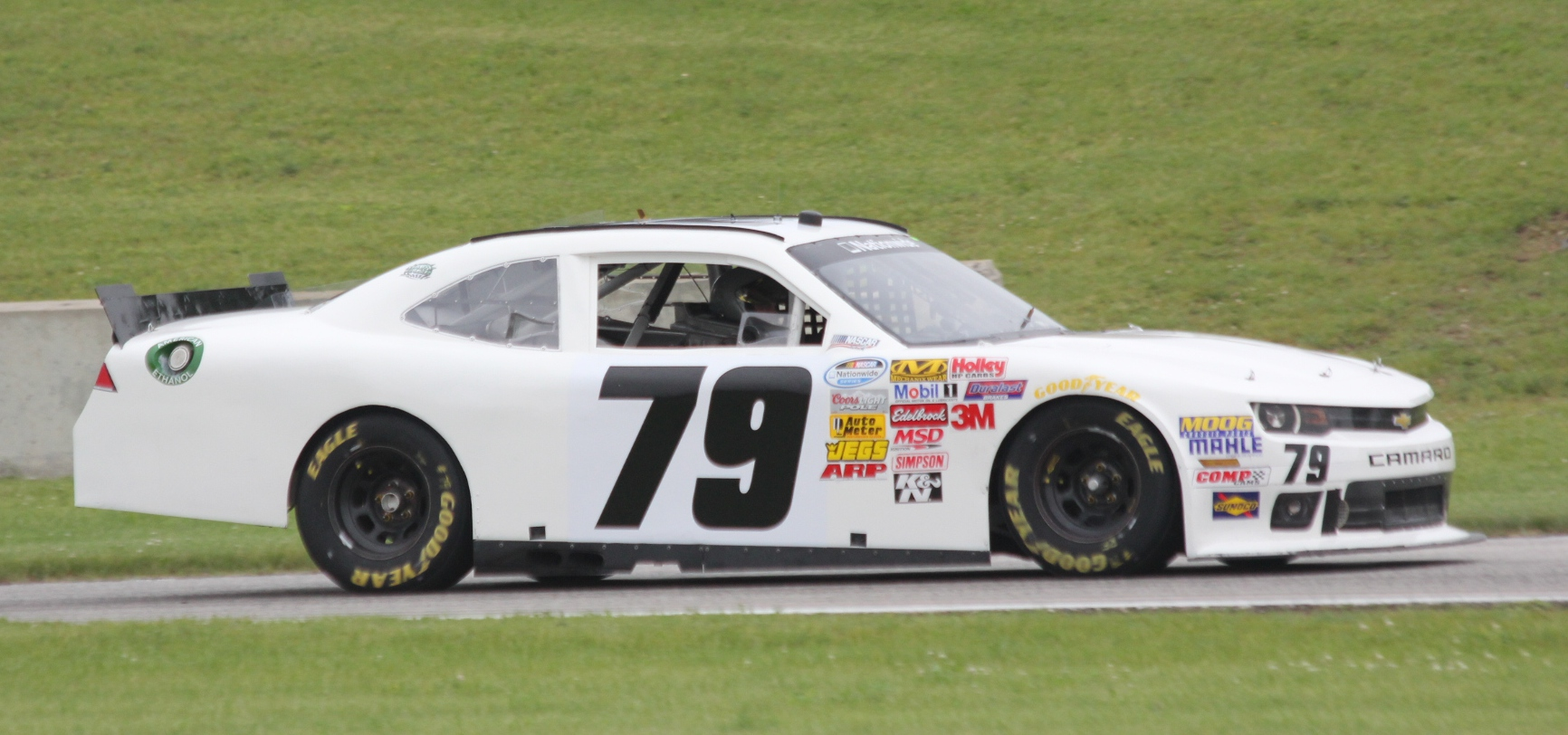
Tim Schendel at Road America in 2014

For multiple races in 2014, Jimmy Means Racing fielded a second car, the No. 79, which was a late entry/field filler team for races to have a full 40-car field. The car is the backup car from No. 52 but renumbered. Carl Long, Tim Schendel and John Jackson all drove one race each and start and parked.

In 2015, the No. 79 returned to complete the 40-car field five times. Matt Frahm drove for two races, Ryan Ellis, Zachary Bruenger and John Jackson all drove one race each. They start and parked all of them.

In 2016, the team returned to complete the 40-car field. Josh Williams drove at Michigan.

After the No. 79 did not attempt any races in 2017, the car did return once in 2018 with Josh Reaume driving it at Kentucky.

==== Car No. 79 results ====
NASCAR Xfinity Series results
Year	Driver	No.	Make	1	2	3	4	5	6	7	8	9	10	11	12	13	14	15	16	17	18	19	20	21	22	23	24	25	26	27	28	29	30	31	32	33	Owners	Pts
2014	Carl Long	79	Toyota	DAY	PHO	LVS	BRI	CAL; 38	TEX	DAR	RCH	TAL	IOW	CLT	DOV	MCH																					64th	0
2014	Tim Schendel	79	Chevy														ROA; 37	KEN	DAY	NHA	CHI	IND	IOW	GLN													64th	0
2014	John Jackson	79	Chevy																						MOH; 34	BRI	ATL	RCH	CHI	KEN	DOV	KAN	CLT	TEX	PHO	HOM	64th	0
2015	Matt Frahm	79	Chevy	DAY	ATL	LVS	PHO	CAL	TEX	BRI	RCH	TAL	IOW	CLT	DOV	MCH	CHI; 39	DAY		NHA; 35	IND																55th	0
2015	Ryan Ellis	79	Chevy																KEN; 39																		55th	0
2015	Zachary Bruenger	79	Chevy																			IOW; 38	GLN														55th	0
2015	John Jackson	79	Chevy																					MOH; 38	BRI	ROA	DAR	RCH	CHI	KEN	DOV	CLT	KAN	TEX	PHO	HOM	55th	0
2016	Josh Williams	79	Chevy	DAY	ATL	LVS	PHO	CAL	TEX	BRI	RCH	TAL	DOV	CLT	POC	MCH; 38	IOW	DAY	KEN	NHA	IND	IOW	GLN	MOH	BRI	ROA	DAR	RCH	CHI	KEN	DOV	CLT	KAN	TEX	PHO	HOM	55th	0
2018	Josh Reaume	79	Chevy	DAY	ATL	LVS	PHO	CAL	TEX	BRI	RCH	TAL	DOV	CLT	POC	MCH	IOW	CHI	DAY	KEN; 39	NHA	IOW	GLN	MOH	BRI	ROA	DAR	IND	LVS	RCH	ROV	DOV	KAN	TEX	PHO	HOM	57th	1
