= Kenny Hendrick =

American stock car racing driver

- Born: September 10, 1969 (age 57); Chino, California, U.S.

NASCAR O'Reilly Auto Parts Series career
- 41 races run over 4 years
- Best finish: 52nd (2008)
- First race: 2003 Charter Pipeline 250 (Gateway)
- Last race: 2009 Ford 300 (Homestead)
Wins	Top tens	Poles
0	0	0

NASCAR FedEx Freight Truck Series career
- 24 races run over 4 years
- Best finish: 35th (2003)
- First race: 1996 Kragen 151 (Sears Point)
- Last race: 2007 Toyota Tundra 200 (Nashville)
Wins	Top tens	Poles
0	0	0
- Statistics up to date as of June 7, 2012.

Kenneth Arthur Hendrick (born September 10, 1969) is an American stock car racing driver. He is a former competitor in the NASCAR Nationwide Series and Craftsman Truck Series. He is the twin brother of former USAC midget car driver Kara Hendrick, who died in a racing accident in October 1991.

== Busch Series ==
Hendrick made his Busch Series debut in 2003, when he ran a hodgepodge of entries. He made his debut at Gateway, where he started thirtieth for the Stanton Barrett Racing operation. He ran a solid race and came home 21st. He did a start and park race for GIC-Mixon Motorsports at Nazareth, before doing another start and park at Dover for Rick Allen. Hendrick would return then to the Stanton Barrett Racing for two more 2003 races. He was 35th at Nashville and 27th at Kentucky.

Hendrick was tapped to drive the first Keller Racing vehicles in 2004, a team that ran a ten-race schedule. The new team struggled. Hendrick only qualified for six races and his best finish was an 18th at Kentucky. The Kentucky race was the only one that Hendrick finished. He was released, and he would only compete in one more series race. It, too, came in 2004, when he drove the Ware Racing Enterprises Dodge to a 42nd-place finish in the fall Dover race.

Hendrick returned in 2008 at Mexico driving a second Stanton Barrett Motorsports car in place of Stan Barrett who was originally meant to race for the team. He qualified and finished 38th after pulling in with handling issues. He then drove at Richmond replacing the injured Larry Gunselman at MSRP Motorsports qualifying fortieth and finishing 43rd after parking the car on lap 6. He made a second start for Stanton Barrett at Darlington starting 34th and finishing 36th after parking on lap thirty.

In 2009, Hendrick drove for Smith-Ganassi Racing, a team that had bought the assets of the shut-down No. 40 team.

== Craftsman Truck Series ==
Hendrick ran four Craftsman Truck Series races in 1996 to start his career off. He started his career with a top-ten start: a ninth in his debut at Phoenix. He finished 28th in that race. His best run of the year was a modest 23rd place finish at Las Vegas.

Four more races were in store for Hendrick. He had one top-twenty finish. That was a nineteenth at Texas, racing for Rob Rizzo. He had started the year off with the team, but after finishes of 29th and 24th, they let him go.

Hendrick would not race in this series until 2003, when he did a start and park effort in a second Billy Ballew Motorsports No. 9 entry. Because of the nature of the effort, Hendrick did not complete any of the dozen starts he did and his best finish was a 31st at IRP, where he also recorded his second career top-ten start of tenth.

Hendrick returned to the Trucks when he ran at Kansas Speedway in the No. 16 Xpress Motorsports truck on April 28, 2007.

== Motorsports career results ==
=== SCCA National Championship Runoffs ===
Year	Track	Car	Engine	Class	Finish	Start	Status
1988	Road Atlanta	Swift DB1	Ford	Formula Ford	1	2	Running

=== NASCAR ===
(key) (Bold - Pole position awarded by qualifying time. Italics - Pole position earned by points standings or practice time. * – Most laps led.)

==== Nextel Cup Series ====
NASCAR Nextel Cup Series results
Year	Team	No.	Make	1	2	3	4	5	6	7	8	9	10	11	12	13	14	15	16	17	18	19	20	21	22	23	24	25	26	27	28	29	30	31	32	33	34	35	36	NNCC	Pts	Ref
2004	Gary Keller Racing	35	Chevy	DAY	CAR	LVS	ATL	DAR	BRI	TEX	MAR	TAL	CAL	RCH	CLT	DOV	POC	MCH	SON	DAY	CHI	NHA	POC	IND	GLN	MCH	BRI	CAL	RCH	NHA	DOV; DNQ	TAL	KAN	CLT	MAR	ATL	PHO	DAR	HOM	NA	-	

==== Busch Series ====
NASCAR Busch Series results
Year	Team	No.	Make	1	2	3	4	5	6	7	8	9	10	11	12	13	14	15	16	17	18	19	20	21	22	23	24	25	26	27	28	29	30	31	32	33	34	35	NBSC	Pts	Ref
2003	Stanton Barrett Motorsports	91	Pontiac	DAY	CAR	LVS	DAR	BRI	TEX	TAL	NSH	CAL	RCH; DNQ	GTY; 21		CLT; DNQ																							83rd	280	
2003	Ortec Racing	96	Chevy												NZH; 42																								83rd	280	
2003	Stanton Barrett Motorsports	97	Pontiac														DOV; 41			MLW; DNQ	DAY	CHI	NHA	PPR	IRP	MCH	BRI												83rd	280	
2003	Stanton Barrett Motorsports	91	Chevy															NSH; 35	KEN; 27																				83rd	280	
2003	PF2 Motorsports	94	Chevy																									DAR; DNQ	RCH; DNQ	DOV; DNQ	KAN	CLT	MEM	ATL	PHO	CAR	HOM		83rd	280	
2004	Gary Keller Racing	35	Chevy	DAY	CAR	LVS	DAR	BRI	TEX	NSH	TAL	CAL	GTY; 39	RCH	NZH	CLT; 39	DOV	NSH	KEN; 18	MLW	DAY	CHI; 40	NHA	PPR; 36															71st	348	
2004	Gary Keller Racing	85	Chevy																						IRP; DNQ	MCH	BRI	CAL; 35	RCH										71st	348	
2004	Ware Racing Enterprises	51	Dodge																											DOV; 42	KAN; DNQ	CLT; DNQ	MEM; DNQ	ATL	PHO; DNQ	DAR	HOM		71st	348	
2005	Gary Keller Racing	03	Chevy	DAY	CAL	MXC	LVS	ATL	NSH	BRI	TEX	PHO	TAL	DAR	RCH	CLT	DOV	NSH	KEN; DNQ	MLW	DAY	CHI	NHA	PPR	GTY	IRP	GLN	MCH	BRI	CAL	RCH	DOV	KAN	CLT	MEM	TEX	PHO	HOM	NA	-	
2008	SKI Motorsports	31	Chevy	DAY	CAL	LVS	ATL	BRI	NSH	TEX	PHO	MXC; 38	TAL		DAR; 36		DOV; 40	NSH; 40	KEN; 34	MLW; DNQ	NHA; 40	DAY	CHI; 40	GTY; 36			GLN; DNQ	MCH; 43		CAL; 37	RCH; 40	DOV; 41	KAN; 39		MEM; QL^{†}	TEX; DNQ	PHO; DNQ	HOM; 39	52nd	788	
2008	MSRP Motorsports	91	Chevy											RCH; 43		CLT; 41																							52nd	788	
2008	SKI Motorsports	30	Chevy																						IRP; 34	CGV													52nd	788	
2008	SKI Motorsports	34	Chevy																										BRI; DNQ										52nd	788	
2008	SKI Motorsports	93	Chevy																															CLT; DNQ					52nd	788	
2009	Smith-Ganassi Racing	42	Dodge	DAY; 41	CAL; 26	LVS; 12	BRI; 30	TEX; 25	NSH; 35	PHO; DNQ	TAL; 42	RCH; DNQ	DAR; 36	CLT	DOV	NSH	KEN; 34	MLW	NHA	DAY	CHI	GTY	IRP																56th	777	
2009	Bob Schacht Motorsports	75	Chevy																					IOW; DNQ	GLN	MCH	BRI	CGV	ATL	RCH	DOV	KAN	CAL	CLT					56th	777	
2009	Specialty Racing	61	Ford																																MEM; 37	TEX; 37	PHO	HOM; 38	56th	777	
2010	Jimmy Means Racing	52	Chevy	DAY	CAL	LVS	BRI	NSH	PHO	TEX	TAL	RCH	DAR	DOV	CLT	NSH	KEN; DNQ	ROA	NHA	DAY	CHI	GTY	IRP	IOW	GLN	MCH	BRI	CGV	ATL	RCH	DOV	KAN	CAL	CLT	GTY	TEX	PHO	HOM	NA	-	
^{†} - Qualified but replaced by Stanton Barrett

==== Craftsman Truck Series ====
NASCAR Craftsman Truck Series results
Year	Team	No.	Make	1	2	3	4	5	6	7	8	9	10	11	12	13	14	15	16	17	18	19	20	21	22	23	24	25	26	NCTC	Pts	Ref
1996	Active Motorsports	32	Chevy	HOM	PHO	POR	EVG	TUS	CNS	HPT	BRI	NZH	MLW	LVL	I70	IRP	FLM	GLN	NSV	RCH	NHA	MAR	NWS	SON; 28	MMR; 26	PHO; 35	LVS; 23			61st	316	
1997	Active Motorsports	32	Chevy	WDW; 29																										57th	353	
1997	Walker Evans Racing	21	Chevy		TUS; 24	HOM	PHO	POR	EVG	I70																				57th	353	
1997	RGR Racing	71	Ford								NHA; 32																			57th	353	
1997	RGR Racing	27	Ford									TEX; 19	BRI	NZH	MLW	LVL	CNS	HPT	IRP	FLM	NSV	GLN	RCH	MAR	SON	MMR	CAL	PHO		57th	353	
1997	Thompson Racing	22	Ford																										LVS; DNQ	57th	353	
2003	Fasscore Motorsports	9	Ford	DAY	DAR	MMR	MAR	CLT	DOV	TEX	MEM; 35	MLW	KAN; 36	KEN; 36	GTW; 35	MCH; 34	IRP; 31	NSH; 32	BRI	RCH	NHA; 35	CAL; 35	LVS; DNQ	SBO	TEX; 35	MAR; 36	PHO; 34	HOM		35th	656	
2007	Xpress Motorsports	16	Chevy	DAY	CAL	ATL	MAR	KAN; 35	CLT	MFD	DOV	TEX	MCH	MLW	MEM															58th	286	
2007	Xpress Motorsports	16	Ford													KEN; 34	IRP; 19	NSH; 34	BRI	GTW	NHA	LVS	TAL	MAR	ATL	TEX	PHO	HOM		58th	286	
