= Wood Brothers Racing =

NASCAR auto racing organization

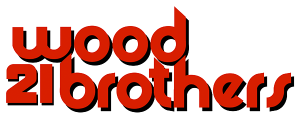
- Owner(s): Leonard Wood; Eddie Wood; Keven Wood; Jordan Wood Hicks; Jon Wood
- Base: Stuart, Virginia; Mooresville, North Carolina
- Series: NASCAR Cup Series
- Race drivers: 21. Jesse Love
- Manufacturer: Ford
- Opened: 1950
- Website: woodbrothersracing.com

Career
- Debut: Cup Series: 1953 1953–11 (Martinsville); Craftsman Truck Series: 2006 GM Flex Fuel 250 (Daytona)
- Latest race: Cup Series: 2026 Season Finale 400 (Homestead); Craftsman Truck Series: 2008 Ford 200 (Homestead)
- Races competed: Total: 1,909; Cup Series: 1,832; Craftsman Truck Series: 77
- Drivers' Championships: Total: 0 Cup Series: 0 Craftsman Truck Series: 0
- Race victories: Total: 101; Cup Series: 101; Craftsman Truck Series: 0
- Pole positions: Total: 120; Cup Series: 119; Craftsman Truck Series: 1

Wood Brothers Racing is an American professional stock car racing team that currently competes in the NASCAR Cup Series. The team was formed in 1950 by brothers Ray Lee, Clay, Delano, Glen, and Leonard Wood. Today, it is owned by the children and grandchildren of Glen Wood—Len Wood, Eddie Wood, Kim Hall, Jon Wood, Jordan Hicks, Brent Wood and Keven Wood. From 2006 to 2008, the team was merged with Tad and Jodi Geschickter's JTG Racing. The Wood Brothers Racing Team holds the unique distinction of being the oldest active team in NASCAR, having fielded cars since 1950. They are known for their long relationship with Ford Motor Company, and the long-standing use of the number 21 on their main car. The team currently fields the No. 21 Ford Mustang full-time for Jesse Love and has a technical alliance with Team Penske.

== Cup Series ==
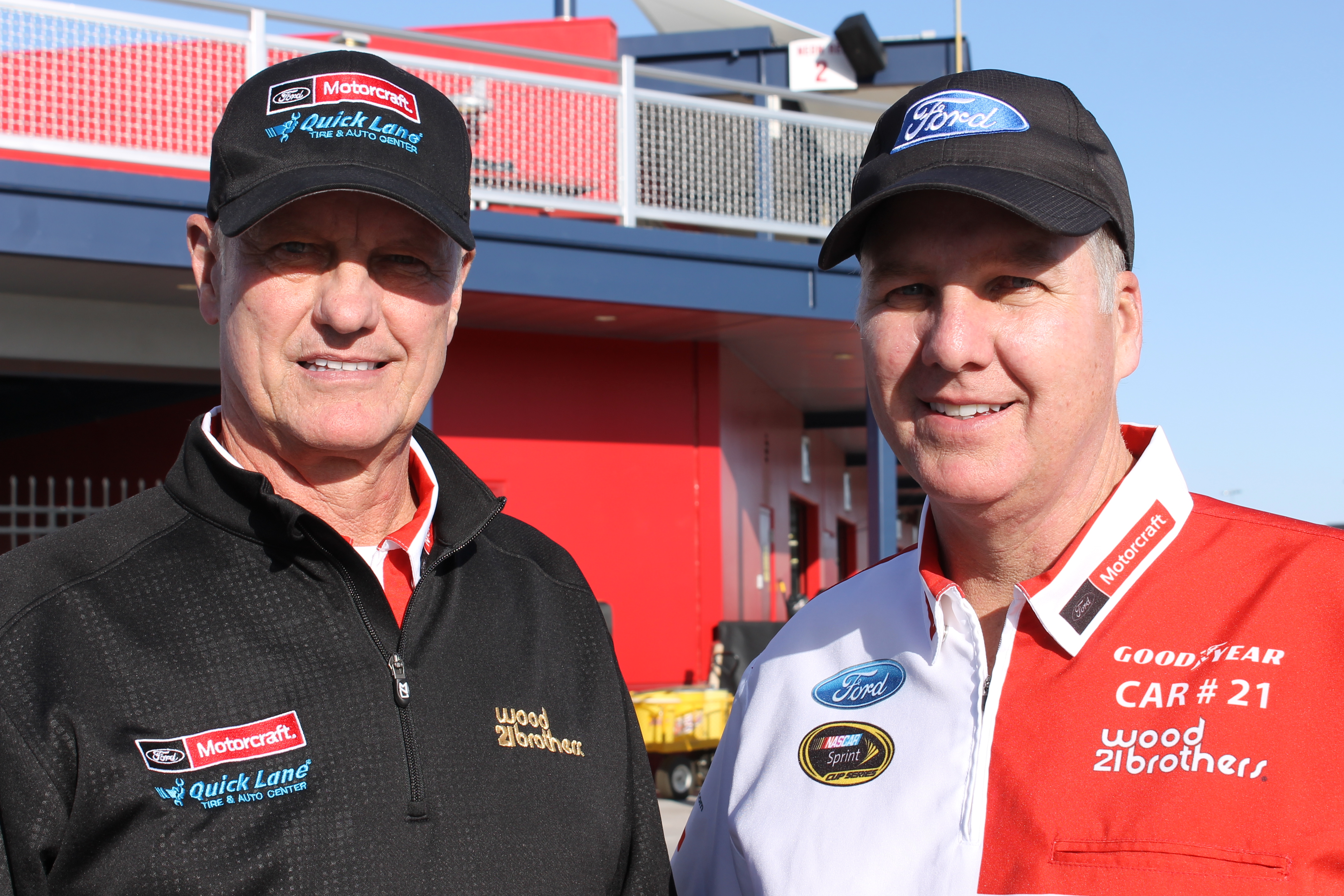
Len and Eddie Wood at Las Vegas Motor Speedway in 2015

=== Car No. 21 history ===
The Wood Brothers Racing Team was founded in 1950 by brothers from the Blue Ridge Mountains of Southwest Virginia. Walter and Ada Wood, who owned a farm near Woolwine and Stuart, Virginia, had five sons—Glen, Leonard, Delano, Clay, and Ray Lee—and one daughter, Crystal. The sons worked with their father as mechanics, farmers, and lumbermen. Glen Wood cut timber and hauled lumber to local sawmills, and the brothers honed their auto mechanic skills in their father's garage. Inspired by Curtis Turner, a local sawmill operator and champion racecar driver known for his "win or crash" style, the brothers formed a stock car racing team. Turner, who later co-owned Charlotte Motor Speedway, eventually became a driver for the Wood Brothers.

In the early 1950s, the Wood Brothers needed a driver, so they asked their friend John Conway, who declined. They then recruited fellow lumberman Chris Williams. Back then, race teams drove their cars to the track, raced, and then drove them home. Williams and the Wood Brothers bought their first car for $50, leading them to number it 50—years before adopting their iconic No. 21. Chris Williams and Glen Wood each drove in a few races for the team, which included Williams, his brothers, and the Wood brothers. They found success, winning at Bowman Gray Stadium in Winston-Salem, NC, and Martinsville Speedway in Martinsville, VA.

After their early success, Chris Williams sold his share of the team to Glen Wood to focus on his lumber business. The Wood Brothers then enlisted local friends and family, including Wood's cousin Ralph Edwards, to fill team roles. Over the years, the Wood Brothers Racing Team grew from a weekend hobby into a full-time business. Glen and Leonard worked full-time building and preparing cars, while the other brothers and crew helped on nights and weekends outside their regular jobs. Their first permanent shop was located at the edge of Stuart, Virginia.

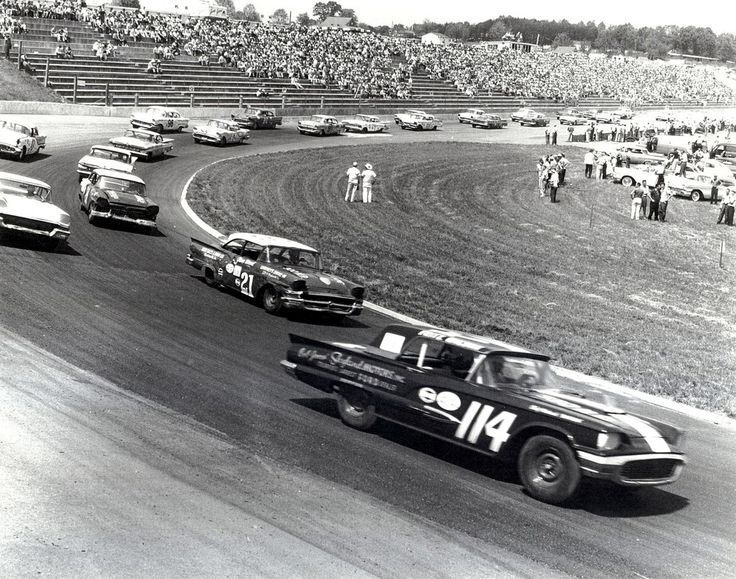
Glen Wood driving the second place 21 in 1959

The team permanently adopted the No. 21, making it as iconic in NASCAR as Petty's No. 43 and Earnhardt's No. 3. Drawn by the big cash prizes at Superspeedway races in cities like Daytona, Charlotte, and Darlington, the Wood Brothers shifted focus. Glen Wood stepped back from driving, and they began hiring proven winners to drive the No. 21 Ford at various tracks.

The team quickly rose to compete at the highest levels, achieving victories through the mechanical genius of brothers, relatives, and friends. Leonard Wood's talent in engine work soon earned the team acclaim, rivaling only the legendary Holman-Moody engines and the Petty racing dynasty of Lee and Richard Petty.

==== Innovation ====
The Wood Brothers revolutionized motor racing by inventing the modern pit stop. In the early days of racing, drivers would pull into the pits, turn off their cars, step out, and sometimes smoke a cigarette while the crew changed tires and serviced the vehicle. The Wood Brothers realized that minimizing time off the track could improve their position. They developed the pit stop common today, which is used in all types of racing.

As other teams noticed the Wood Brothers' success with efficient pit stops, they quickly adopted the Wood method. The Wood team, however, continued to refine pit stops into a precise, mechanical ballet, maintaining their advantage over competitors. Other racing organizations took note of the Wood Brothers' pit stop innovations. In 1965, Ford invited the Wood Brothers team to the Indianapolis 500 to support the Lotus-Ford team. Their speed and precision in the pits contributed to Jim Clark's victory in the 1965 Indianapolis 500.

==== 1960s international success ====
After their Indianapolis 500 win, Wood Brothers Racing gained international acclaim as motorsport pioneers and leaders. Featured in Sports Illustrated and other major media, they built a top-tier roster of drivers, with victories rivaled only by Richard Petty.

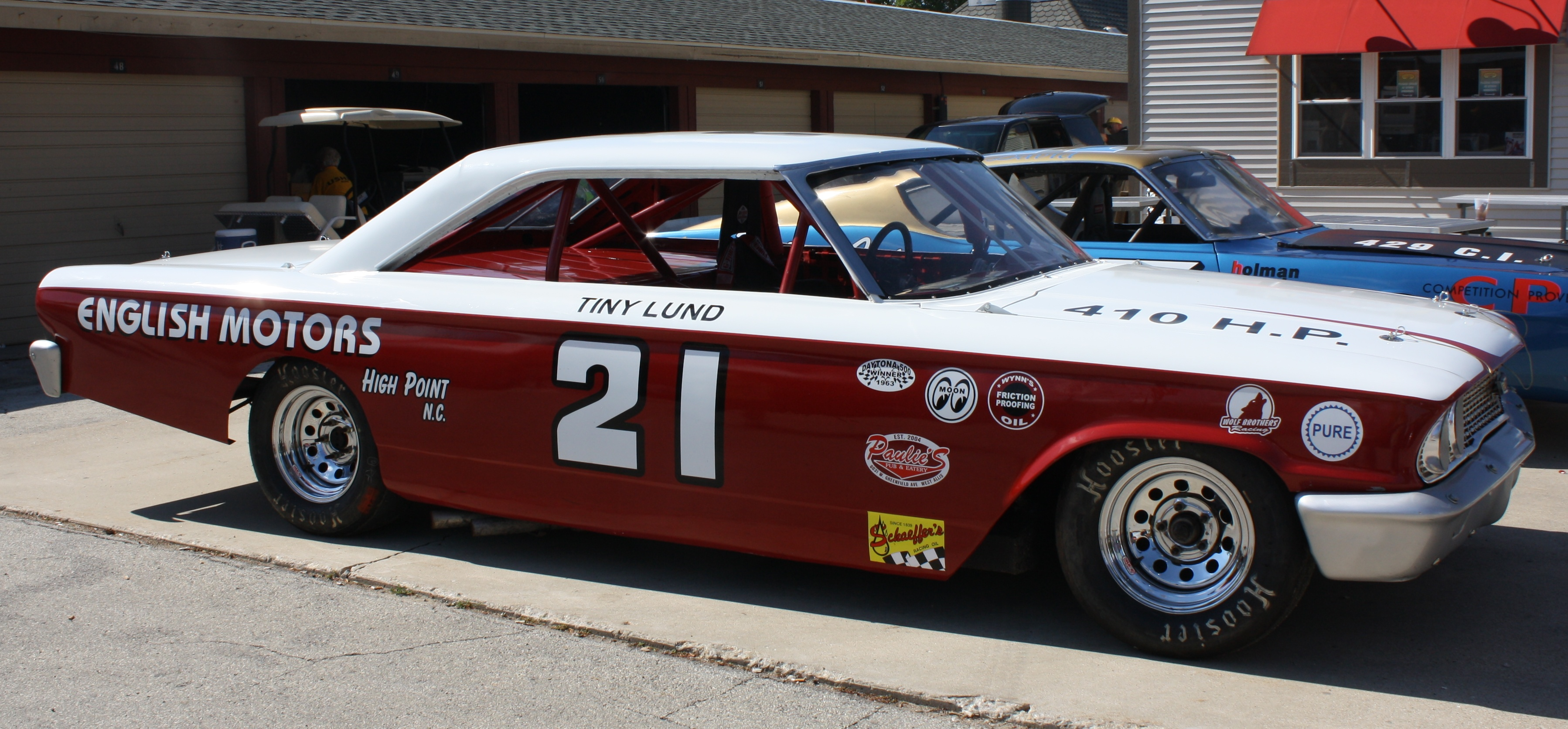
1963 Tiny Lund/Wood Brothers NASCAR car or replica

The Wood Brothers signed a long-term deal with Purolator as the primary sponsor for the No. 21 car. Their drivers through the mid-1960s included top stock car racers like Curtis Turner, Marvin Panch, Fireball Roberts, Parnelli Jones, Tiny Lund, Junior Johnson, Speedy Thompson, Fred Lorenzen, and Cale Yarborough.

The Wood Brothers fielded a second car, the No. 121, in select races, even entering three cars in one event. Open-wheel star Dan Gurney, known for his success in Indycar and Formula One, drove the No. 121 on NASCAR road courses for the team. The Gurney-Wood pairing dominated, winning every race Gurney entered for them, including the Motor Trend 500 at Riverside International Raceway, Moreno Valley, California in 1963, 1964, 1965, 1966, and 1968. In the 1968 season, the Wood Brothers earned over $160,000 ($1,544,910 Today) in single-season winnings—a remarkable amount for that era in any form of auto racing.

==== Dominance ====
In the early 1970s, the Wood Brothers maintained their success with the No. 21 car, known for its lightning-quick pit stops and powerful engines, which posed a formidable challenge to competitors on the NASCAR circuit. Legendary drivers like Donnie Allison and A.J. Foyt, an open-wheel Indy 500 winner, also took turns behind the wheel of the Wood car.

As the team participated in more events and traveled greater distances, the personnel in the wood shop began to change. Glen Wood emerged as the team's leader and patriarch. His young sons, Eddie and Len, started working in the shop in menial labor roles. Glen's brother, Delano Wood, became one of the greatest pit crew members, with unmatched skill as a jackman even today. Additionally, family friends, including Cecil Wilson from neighboring Lawsonville, North Carolina, soon joined the team.

==== Modern era ====
David Pearson (1972–1979)

In 1972, David Pearson became the full-time driver of the No. 21 car, launching one of motorsports' most successful runs. From 1972 to 1979, the team competed in 143 races, securing 46 wins and 51 poles, with race earnings exceeding $1.3 million.

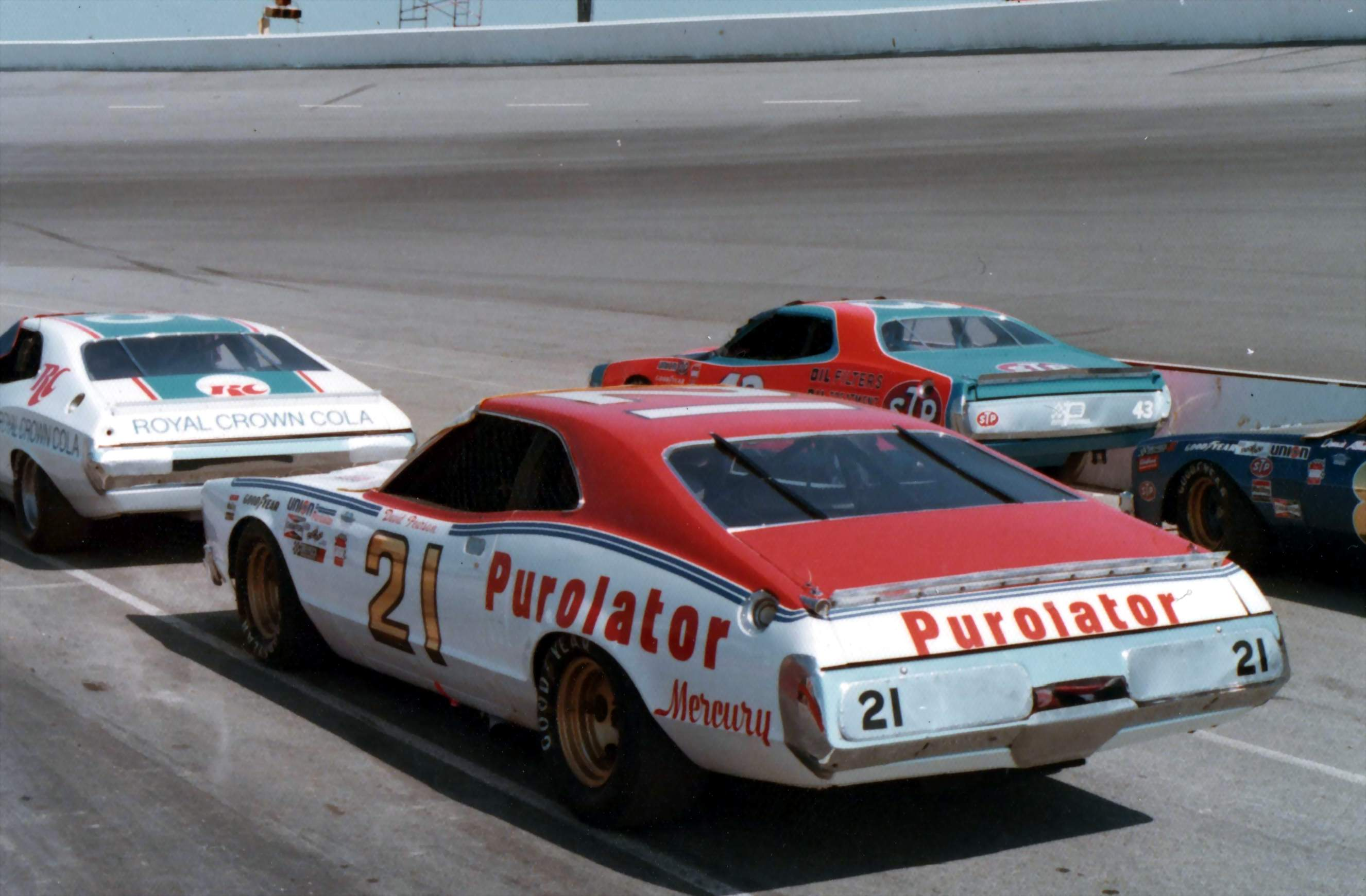
David Pearson's 21 Mercury

In 1976, with Pearson still driving, the Wood Brothers achieved NASCAR's "Triple Crown" by winning the Daytona 500 at Daytona, the World 600 at Charlotte, and the Southern 500 at Darlington. Due to their remarkable success and exemplary qualities as role models and ambassadors of the sport, the Wood Brothers were invited to the White House in the late 1970s at the request of President Jimmy Carter. This occasion marked a historic moment for the brothers and their friends from the small town of Stuart, Virginia.

As NASCAR gained prominence as an emerging sport, the Wood team quickly earned a reputation as one of the best. They were often celebrated and compared to top athletes from other sports, such as baseball legend Reggie Jackson, football stars Terry Bradshaw and Franco Harris, and basketball icons Julius Erving and Kareem Abdul-Jabbar. Due to growth and increased demand, the No. 21 team relocated from its former shop to a new facility at the junction of Dobyns Road and Mayo Court in Stuart, where it would remain for many years.

Neil Bonnett (1979–1982)

The 1980s brought significant changes to NASCAR and the No. 21 team. Driver David Pearson departed, making way for rising star Neil Bonnett from Hueytown, Alabama. Bonnett was part of the "Alabama Gang," which included notable drivers like Bobby and Donnie Allison, as well as later members Davey Allison and Hut Stricklin.

Bonnett and the Wood Brothers team enjoyed a successful partnership that spanned three and a half seasons and 83 races, achieving nine victories and over $700,000 ($2,275,483 today) in winnings. During the "Bonnett Years," Purolator's longtime president, Paul Cameron, retired, leading to the conclusion of the Wood Brothers' long-term sponsorship with Purolator. This marked the end of one of the most enduring and iconic sponsorships in NASCAR history.

The No. 21 car was sponsored by National Engineer, a California-based company specializing in research and development across various industries. The company was owned by the Warner Hodgdon, who prominently featured his name on the No. 21 car as its main sponsor. This sponsorship was considered one of the richest deals in NASCAR history, further solidifying Wood's status as a leader in the sport. Many original team members, including brothers Clay and Ray Lee Wood, have retired from racing, choosing to focus on their families and other careers in Patrick County.

As the number of race events increased and the demands of running a team intensified each season, the Wood Brothers hired younger team members to fill the gaps. This included the son of original crew member Jimmy Edwards and the Wood Brothers' cousin, Ralph Edwards. They also welcomed Curtis Quesinberry and Hylton Tatum from Stuart, along with another young relative, Butch Moricle. Additional personnel were recruited from nearby Virginia towns such as Danville and Roanoke. During these years, Kim Wood, the only daughter of Glen and Bernece Wood, emerged in an important role. While still in high school, she began handling administrative tasks for the team, assisting her mother with secretarial duties, travel arrangements, and the business aspects of team operations.

Buddy Baker (1983–1984)

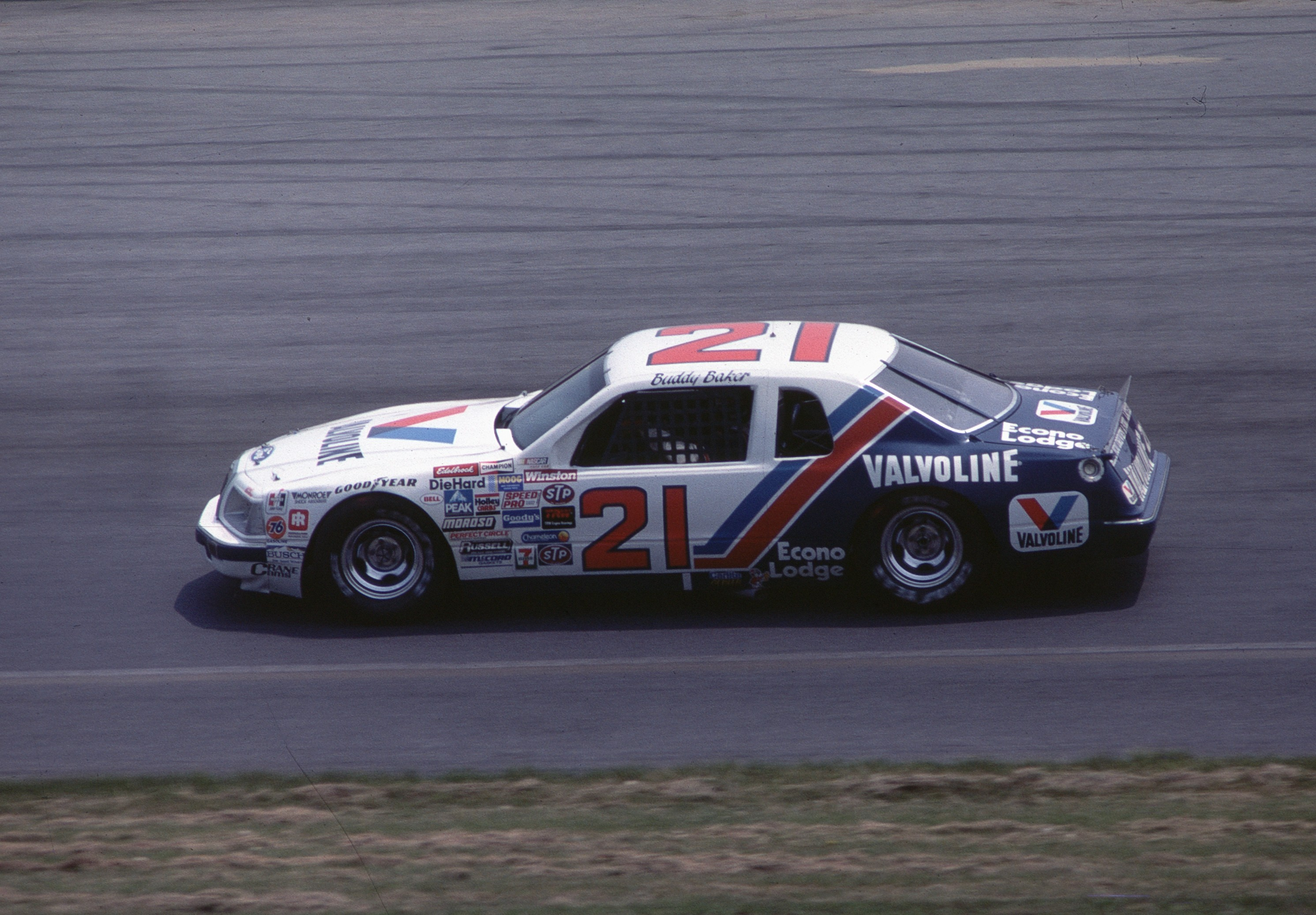
Buddy Baker's No. 21 Ford Thunderbird

In the mid-1980s, NASCAR entered what is now known as the modern era of the sport. Television coverage evolved from sporadic broadcasts on ABC's Wide World of Sports to full-time coverage of the Daytona 500 by CBS and live race broadcasts by emerging cable networks like ESPN and TBS. NASCAR secured permanent corporate sponsorship from R.J. Reynolds Tobacco Company, leading to a rebranding of the sport's top series from the Grand National Division to the Winston Cup Series. Notably, R.J. Reynolds, the company's founder, was born and raised in Patrick County, just a few miles from the Wood Brothers team's headquarters.

The Modern Era marked the first comprehensive quest for points championships among most teams. Since the 1950s, many teams participated in only select races. However, to compete for the series title and its substantial cash prize, teams were now required to participate in all events within the scheduled season. The Wood Brothers made the decision to transition to a full-time racing schedule, which significantly increased the team's workload and required greater investments of time, money, and manpower. As part of this new commitment, Warner Hodgdon and National Engineering departed as sponsors, and Valvoline was brought on as the team's primary patron.

In 1983, legendary driver Buddy Baker was hired to replace the departing Neil Bonnett in the No. 21 car. However, he and the Woods team struggled for the first time in many years, lasting only two seasons together. Despite this, they achieved a notable victory at the Firecracker 400 at Daytona that same year. Baker and the Woods parted ways, along with Valvoline as the sponsor. International star driver Bobby Rahal from the IndyCar series briefly filled Baker's vacant seat for one race.

Kyle Petty (1985–1988)

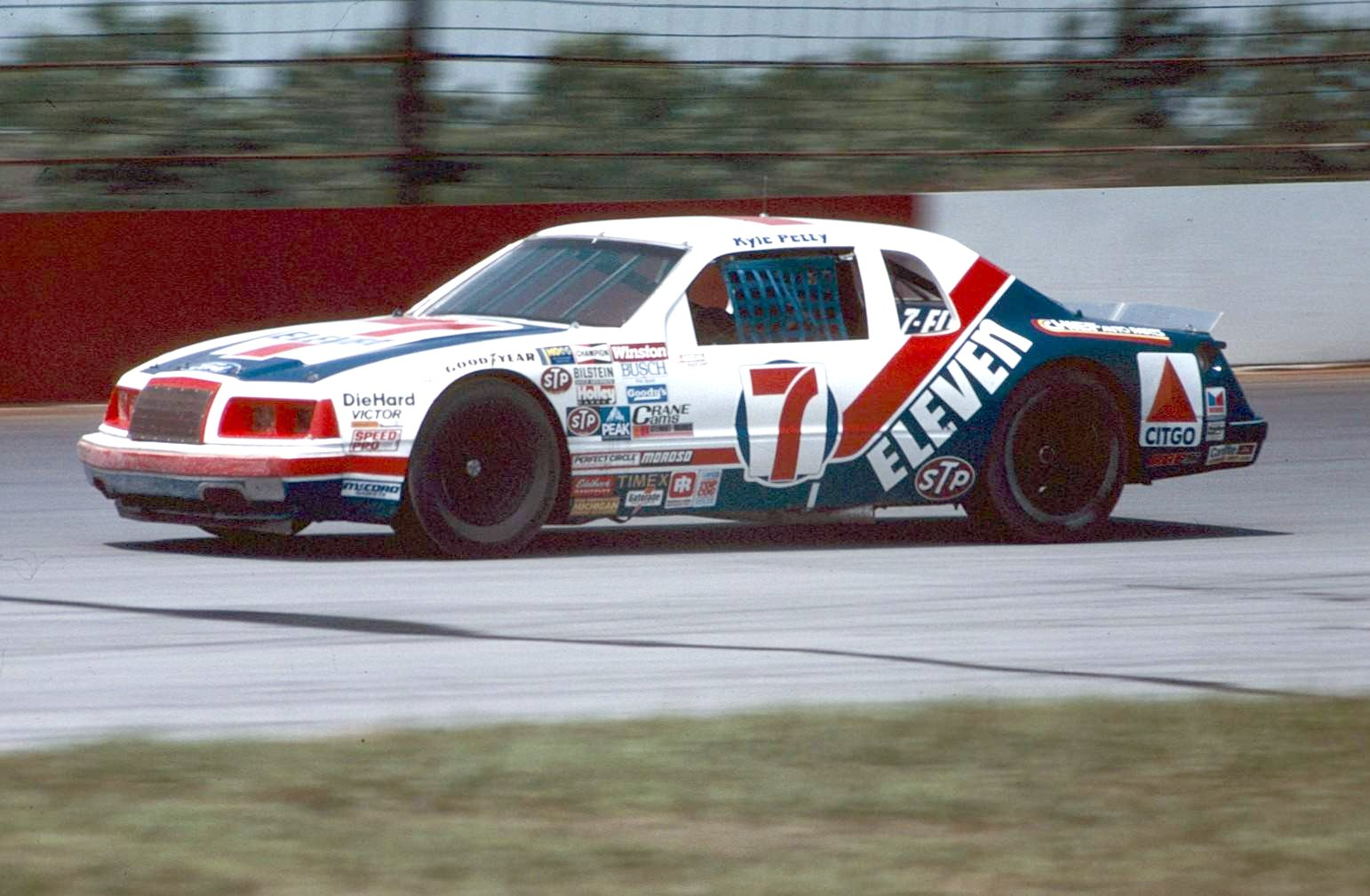
Kyle Petty, driving the 7/Eleven Ford at Pocono in 1985

The 1985 season was historic for NASCAR as young Kyle Petty, the grandson of legendary Lee Petty and son of series dominator Richard Petty, was hired to drive the No. 21 car full-time. This marked a unique partnership between the two most successful racing families in NASCAR history.

This also marked the first addition of a new sponsor to the Wood Brothers team. For the 1985 season, the team partnered with a trio of corporate sponsors: 7-Eleven, Citgo, and Chief Auto Parts. As part of this marketing strategy, the Wood Brothers were required to relinquish their iconic No. 21 car number and adopt the No. 7 to align with the 7-Eleven sponsorship. This change sparked significant discussion among the team's fans, who associated the No. 21 with the legendary history of the Virginia-based team. This also marked the emergence of the second generation of the Wood Brothers, Eddie and Len, who had taken on increased responsibilities within the team over the years. They were now effectively calling the shots on race day, fostering an "anything goes" attitude that was embraced by the entire team.

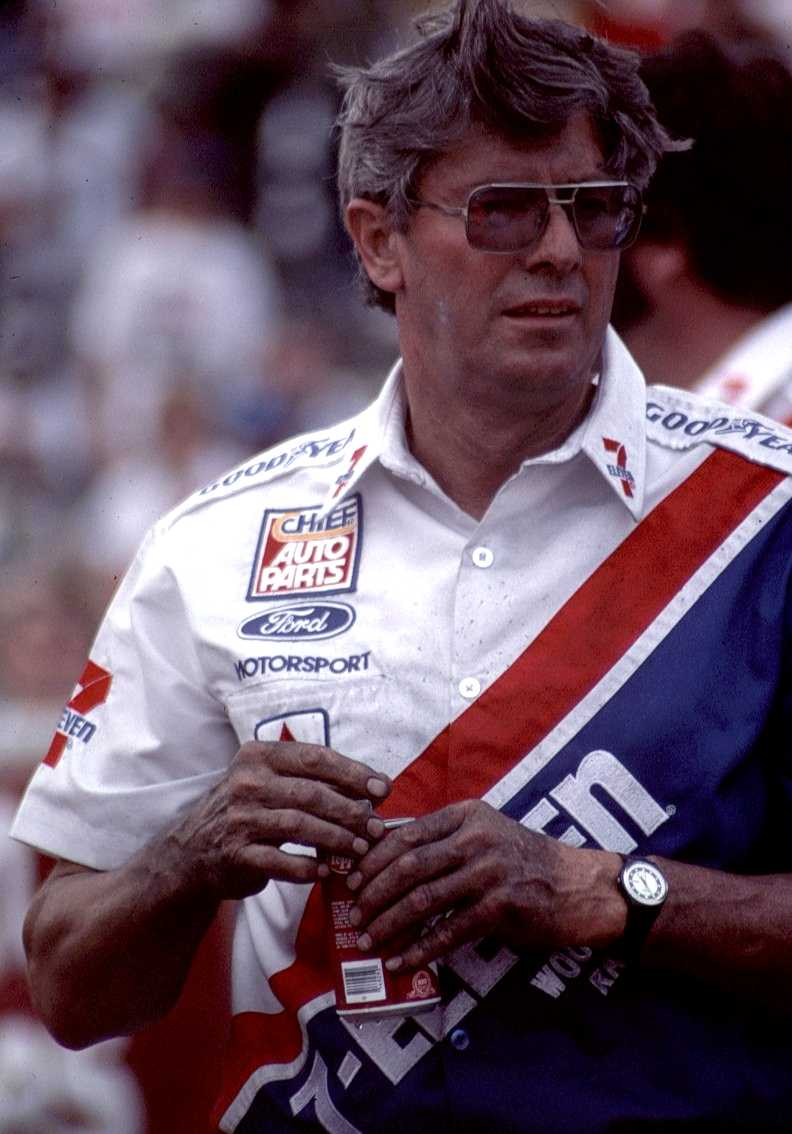
Leonard Wood in the 80s

By this time, many of the older team members had retired, including Delano Wood, the original member and brother. He retired to focus on his burgeoning lumber business and to spend more time with his family and church. Most races were held on Sundays, which left little opportunity for regular worship and family attendance at church.

Kyle Petty achieved victory in his second season with the Wood Brothers at Richmond Raceway in Richmond, Virginia.In 1987, the team returned to their traditional No. 21 car and won the Coca-Cola 600 at Charlotte Motor Speedway. Just as the Petty-Wood partnership was starting to flourish, Kyle Petty was drawn to a new opportunity with SABCO Racing, owned by Felix Sabates. Unable to turn down the lucrative offer, Petty left the Wood Brothers after four seasons and 115 races. During their time together, the team won two races and earned over $1.3 million.

Neil Bonnett (1989–1990)

After Petty's departure and a brief three-race stint with substitute driver Tommy Ellis, the Wood Brothers hired their former driver Neil Bonnett to once again pilot the No. 21 car. This reunion was seen as a potential turning point for the Woods as they sought to reclaim their position at the top of the sport. Both Bonnett and the Wood Brothers were optimistic about their future together, with the chemistry from their earlier successes still evident.

After just 31 races together, spanning one full season and the start of another, Bonnett suffered serious injuries in a crash at Darlington Raceway. This left him questioning whether he could race again, and he parted ways with the Wood team, leaving an empty seat that was later filled by Dale Jarrett. During this period, sponsorship shuffling became common across all NASCAR teams. Recognizing the immense value of NASCAR sponsorship, major companies like Pepsi, Mello Yello, Ford Motorcraft, and Procter & Gamble secured lucrative deals with the sport's top teams.

The face of the sport was also changing. Alongside the full schedule and championship points races, a new generation of drivers, including Darrell Waltrip, Dale Earnhardt, Bill Elliott, Rusty Wallace, Ricky Rudd, Terry Labonte, and Geoff Bodine, had become powerful stars and champions. During this era, young drivers like Davey Allison, Ward and Jeff Burton, Jeff Gordon, and Bobby Labonte were emerging as the sport's future, making their way up through the lower-ranked Busch Grand National Series.

New technologies and innovations began to dominate the sport, transforming NASCAR teams into highly organized operations run like corporations or major sports franchises. Prominent names such as Hendrick Motorsports, Penske Racing, Roush Racing, SABCO, Larry Hedrick Motorsports, and Robert Yates Racing emerged, overtaking the dominance previously held by teams like Junior Johnson, Melling Racing, and Petty Enterprises.

The Wood Brothers expanded their team to keep up with NASCAR's growth, adding more employees and assigning some to work in the shop and others to the race-day crew. New team members, such as Bennie Belcher, Butch Mitchell, and outside engine builder Tommy Turner, helped bring the team in line with other NASCAR competitors.

Dale Jarrett (1990–1991)

By 1990, the Wood Brothers returned to the No. 21 Ford with Citgo as their sponsor. After losing Neil Bonnett early in the season, Eddie and Len Wood needed a replacement driver. They turned to their longtime friend Dale Jarrett, who was ready for his chance in the Winston Cup Series. As the son of former NASCAR champion and broadcaster Ned Jarrett, Dale Jarrett had grown up in the sport alongside the Wood Brothers.

In their first full season together in 1991, Jarrett brought the Wood Brothers' No. 21 car to victory lane at Michigan, narrowly defeating Davey Allison in one of NASCAR's closest finishes. This victory demonstrated that the Wood Brothers team still had what it took to win and marked a significant milestone for Jarrett, providing his first career win and serving as a launching pad for one of the most successful careers in modern NASCAR history.

The Michigan victory upheld a unique tradition for the Wood Brothers team: every rookie driver who had completed a full season in their No. 21 car had secured at least one win. From 1953 to 2002, every driver who raced a full season with the Wood Brothers had achieved at least one victory, though in one instance, the win was not in a points-paying race.

The Wood-Jarrett partnership was regarded as one of the most promising in NASCAR. However, Jarrett was soon drawn away by Washington Commanders coach and Joe Gibbs, who established a new team Joe Gibbs Racing with the financial resources to attract Jarrett. Leaving the No. 21 car, Jarrett began driving the No. 18 Interstate Batteries Chevy, a move that led to his first Daytona 500 victory.

Jarrett's tenure in the No. 21 car was brief, spanning only 53 races across two seasons, but it resulted in one victory and over $600,000 in earnings. This experience further solidified the Wood Brothers team's reputation as a premier organization in NASCAR, known for nurturing future superstars.

Morgan Shepherd (1992–1995)

After Jarrett's departure, the Woods turned to veteran driver Morgan Shepherd to fill the seat for the 1992 season. Shepherd had been a reliable performer in the top series throughout his career and was a strong championship contender. His consistent top finishes would bring stability to the team as they adapted to the evolving landscape of the sport.

The new decade ushered in significant changes in NASCAR, characterized by a greater emphasis on technology and engineering. Engineers became a standard presence within teams, and race-day crews began training like professional athletes. In fact, many teams even hired professional athletes to assist with car servicing during pit stops. The cost of racing increased significantly, and its appeal doubled each year. NASCAR was now broadcast live internationally and enjoyed popularity comparable to traditional stick-and-ball sports among fans and advertisers.

Team turnover became frequent as Eddie and Len searched for the ideal combination of chemistry to succeed. They added new members from nearby Mount Airy, North Carolina, including Rick Simmons and Mike "Andretti" Smith. They also hired paint and body specialists Terry Hill and Chris Martin. Meanwhile, longtime members Butch Moricle, Butch Mitchell, Hylton Tatum, and Cecil Wilson had become seasoned veterans on the team.

Glen Wood's daughter, Kim, emerged as a competent leader within the team, excelling in her role. Alongside managing the business and administrative functions, she operated as a "one-woman show," handling all bookings, reservations, accommodations, travel, and financial matters for the team. While other teams, like Richard Childress Racing, employed a full-time staff of a dozen administrative workers, Kim demonstrated her professionalism in this field, matching her brothers' expertise in the mechanical and competitive aspects of the team.

By this time, Kim Wood had married crew member Terry Hall and became Kim Wood-Hall. Terry Hall, a crucial member of the team, served as a general mechanic and truck driver. He replaced the legendary Delano Wood as jackman on race day after Delano's retirement several years earlier. Hailing from Mount Airy, Terry also helped recruit new team members through his connections in the area.

The No. 21 team continued to innovate in the sport they helped build by experimenting with various changes. They had previously outsourced much of their engine work and, during this period, contracted Robert Yates Racing to supply engine parts for the No. 21. Additionally, they implemented weight training routines for crew members and enhanced their use of technology during race day competition.

The Wood team, always at the forefront of innovation in pit stops, consistently practiced and sought new improvements in their race day skills. They utilized computers extensively for car setup and timing. By hiring race day specialists like spotter Chuck Joyce and part-time scorers/timers, the team remained at the cutting edge of competitive development.

In the early 1990s, Eddie Wood, Len Wood, and Kim Wood-Hall each took ownership positions in the team. Previously, the Glen Wood Company had owned the team, with patriarch Glen Wood controlling its direction. Longtime co-founder and former crew chief Leonard Wood had stepped down from his role years prior, and Eddie Wood had officially assumed the position of crew chief for the No. 21 Ford.

Morgan Shepherd performed exceptionally well with the No. 21 Citgo-sponsored car, achieving consistent finishes throughout his four seasons with the Wood Brothers. Together, they secured 52 top-ten finishes and earned over $4 million. Their sole victory came at the 1993 Motorcraft Quality Parts 500 in Atlanta Motor Speedway, a race postponed for six days due to a snowstorm the previous weekend. This win was a significant boost for the team, which had been struggling since Dale Jarrett's victory at Michigan.

Michael Waltrip (1996–1998)

As the 1996 season approached, the Woods sought a younger driver to take the helm of the No. 21 Ford. With Shepherd nearing retirement and the rise of youthful talent like Jeff Gordon, the team aimed to capitalize on this trend. They parted ways with Shepherd and welcomed Michael Waltrip, the younger brother of three-time series champion and 1989 Daytona 500 winner Darrell Waltrip.

Although they did not achieve an official regular-season victory, Waltrip and the Wood Brothers celebrated an impressive win at the 1996 Winston Select All-Star Race. In their first season together, the team delivered a remarkable performance that earned them a $200,000 ($410,567 Today) prize that night, showcasing exceptional teamwork. During Waltrip's three-season, 95-race tenure with the Woods, the team amassed over $3.7 million in winnings.

Elliott Sadler (1999–2002)

At the start of the 1999 season, the Wood Brothers brought in Elliott Sadler to replace the departing Michael Waltrip. Like the Wood family, Sadler is a Virginia native with deep roots in racing. As a young and talented rookie, Sadler aimed to make a name for himself in the Winston Cup Series. Given the Wood Brothers' strong reputation for developing new talent, many anticipated great success from this partnership.

The No. 21 team underwent pivotal changes during this period. After decades at their old shop on Dobyns Road in Stuart, the Wood Brothers built a massive, state-of-the-art facility at the town's Industrial Park. This new location was modern, spacious, and provided ample room for the team's continued growth and development.

The new home also included a museum dedicated to Wood Brothers memorabilia and history. Bernice Wood, Glen Wood's wife, who had served as the family's unofficial archivist since the 1950s, curated a collection of historical items for visitors. She and Kim Wood spent considerable time preparing the museum and providing guided tours to visitors. The museum became a popular destination for NASCAR fans.

Personnel changes continued over the years, with some staff departing and new hires joining the team. A full-time secretarial assistant, Annpaige Bowles, was hired a few years earlier to help manage demanding office tasks and oversee the museum. To strengthen the workforce, previous hires included William Fulp, John Ilowiecki, and Barry Sheppard, who brought expertise as parts managers, couriers, engineers, and shock specialists. Additionally, new equipment such as a chassis dyno and a shock dyno was introduced.

Among the recent hires was legendary engine builder Danny Glad. He had previously worked with the Paul Andrews-led Alan Kulwicki team in 1992 and joined the Woods after leaving Geoff Bodine. Danny Glad, along with renowned figures like Randy Dorton and Lou Larosa, was considered one of the top engine specialists in the sport.

Young Elliott Sadler began his career in the No. 21 car and quickly established himself among the top performers in NASCAR. Eddie and Len Wood made a significant move by hiring Crew Chief Mike Beam, the first non-Wood family member to hold that position for the No. 21 team. Beam, who had previously achieved success with Junior Johnson, Bud Moore, and others, brought valuable experience to the team. This partnership with Sadler also enabled Eddie and Len to focus more on managing their growing business operations.

In 2000, Wood Brothers Racing celebrated a historic milestone: their 50th anniversary. A special ceremony was held to honor their significant achievements. Hailing from the small town of Stuart in the Blue Ridge Mountains, the team, composed of brothers, relatives, and friends, gained international acclaim as pioneers in motorsport competition. That year, brothers Glen Wood and Leonard Wood were also inducted into the prestigious Motorsports Hall of Fame of America.

In the 2001 season, the Sadler-Wood combination started to show results on the track, with Sadler securing his first victory in the No. 21 Ford at Bristol. This win was significant as it marked the Wood Brothers' first triumph at Bristol in their history and their first win in eight years. The team had not focused on short tracks like Bristol for many years, primarily concentrating on superspeedways.

During this period, the relationship between Wood Brothers Racing and Roush Racing, led by engine expert Jack Roush from Michigan, strengthened significantly. Roush fielded several competitive teams, including those driven by Jeff Burton and Mark Martin. This partnership provided the Wood Brothers with access to the engineering and engine resources that most multi-car teams used to dominate the sport. This collaboration enabled the Woods to leverage a diverse range of specialists and research in their pursuit of victory.

Elliott Sadler continued to improve with the No. 21 car, quickly becoming a target for other teams. The Woods were known for nurturing talent and had invested significant time and effort in bringing Sadler to prominence. After the 2002 season, Sadler transitioned to Robert Yates Racing. His time with the Wood team spanned 139 races, the longest single stint for a driver of the No. 21 since David Pearson's era. During their partnership, Sadler and the Woods secured one victory at Bristol and earned over $9 million in just four seasons.

During Sadler's time in the No. 21, the long-term sponsorship between Wood Brothers Racing and Citgo Petroleum came to an end, marking the conclusion of a historic nearly 20-year partnership. Citgo was replaced by Ford Motorcraft and the United States Air Force, establishing the Wood Brothers team as the de facto "factory team" for Ford Motor Company.

==== The next generation emerges ====
Eddie Wood and his wife Carol have two children: daughter Jordan and son Jonathan. Jordan was a rising beauty queen in local and regional pageants and an award-winning dancer at the Patrick County Dancing Arts Center. In her free time, she helped with administrative duties at the Wood Brothers Racing office to learn about the team's operations. Jonathan followed in the family's footsteps as a competitive racer. Later, Jordan worked for NASCAR before joining the family team full-time in marketing communications.

Jon Wood is following in his grandfather's footsteps as a driver, competing in the World Karting Series and other racing events. Many speculate about his future in NASCAR and with the Wood Brothers team. He currently serves as the Senior Vice President, overseeing merchandise operations and actively managing the team's day-to-day activities.

==== Ricky Rudd (2003–2005) ====
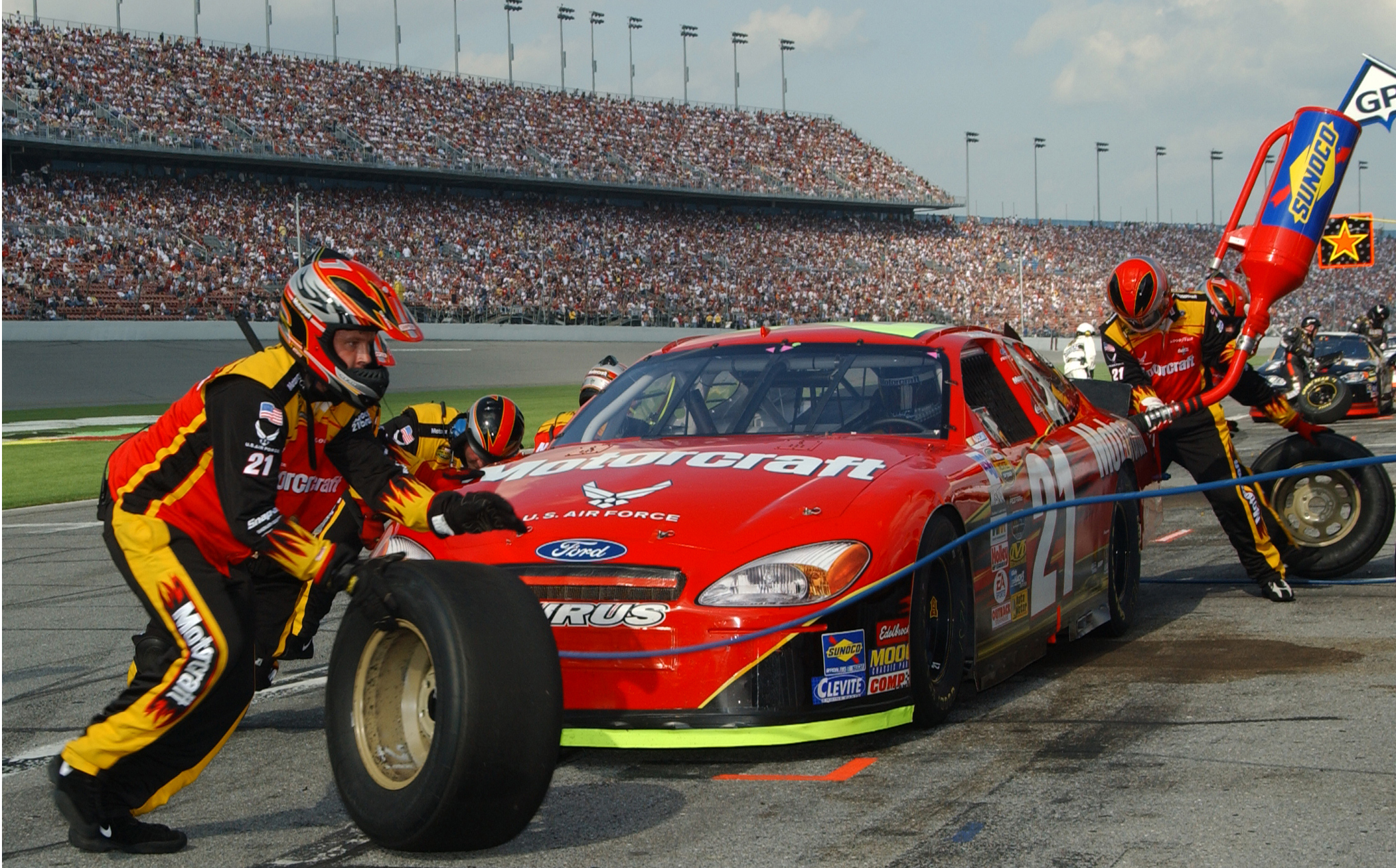
Ricky Rudd pitting in 2004

Veteran driver and Virginia native Ricky Rudd, who previously raced for Robert Yates Racing, took over the seat once occupied by Elliott Sadler. In his first season with the team in 2003, Rudd achieved five top-ten finishes and earned over $3 million in winnings. He finished in second place during his inaugural year driving the No. 21 car.

Eddie and Len Wood worked diligently to find the right mix of crew members and chemistry for their team. After several personnel changes, they ultimately hired Michael "Fatback" McSwain as the crew chief for the No. 21 Motorcraft-sponsored Ford. McSwain and driver Ricky Rudd had previously collaborated at Robert Yates Racing several years earlier.

Meanwhile, the young Jon Wood continued to dominate short tracks across the South and Mid-Atlantic in the Late Model Stock Series and Craftsman Truck Series. Racing for owner Jack Roush, Wood quickly earned a reputation as a "racer" rather than just a "driver," thanks to his hard-charging style and his mature evolution into a competitive force.

Keven Wood began his racing career during this time. The son of Len and Nancy Wood, he studied Motorsports Technology at Patrick & Henry Community College while working at the family race shop. Keven absorbed everything about racing, from car chassis setup to engine tuning. He started racing as a driver in 2002 in the Legends Series, quickly making his mark on every track. His talent shone through, leading to hard-fought victories. In 2004, he moved to the Late Model Stock Series, a challenging environment for emerging champions.

The 2004 Series was a success for the Wood Brothers, but times were changing once again. R.J. Reynolds had withdrawn its sponsorship from NASCAR several years earlier due to lawsuits against tobacco companies, and the top series was now known as the NASCAR Cup Series. The costs of operating a team had reached an all-time high, requiring up to $10 million per year from corporate sponsors just to field a car for a season.

In 2004, the Wood Brothers left their roots in Stuart to establish their main operations near Charlotte, North Carolina. Recognizing that all competitive teams were based in this area, the Woods understood that the move was essential to their pursuit of the Sprint Cup. Relocating to Mooresville, North Carolina provided them with better resources and greater access to personnel and technology in the heart of NASCAR racing, leading to significant changes in team composition. The Woods maintain their shop in Stuart, primarily as a museum and as a secondary facility to their main operations in North Carolina.

Rudd and the Wood Brothers had a successful run in 2004, nearly winning and finishing in second place. They also secured a pole position, marking the team's first since 1984, when Buddy Baker drove the No. 21.

In the 2005 season, Ricky Rudd secured another second-place finish in the No. 21 car at Sonoma and earned over $4 million in winnings. At the end of the season, Rudd announced his retirement after just three seasons with the Wood Brothers, a time marked by significant changes for the team.

==== Ken Schrader (2006–2007) ====
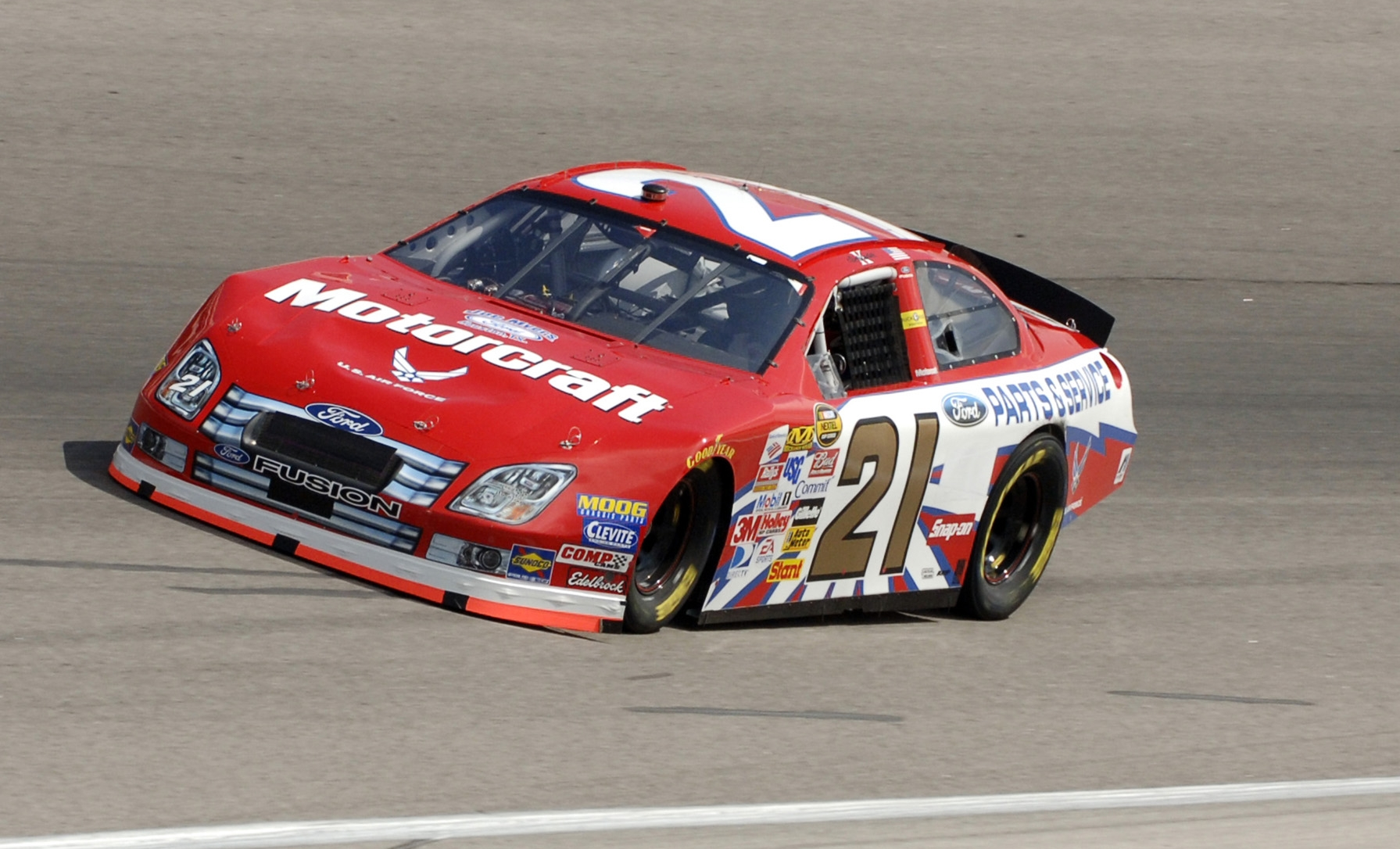
Ken Schrader's 2006 Motorcraft paint scheme

The Woods announced that veteran Ken Schrader would drive the No. 21 car in the 2006. The team secured new primary sponsorship from McKee Foods, while the United States Air Force continued as an associate sponsor alongside Motorcraft. Throughout the season, all three sponsors rotated primary sponsorship duties.

In 2005, a significant shift towards the future was announced for the Wood Brothers Racing Team. They entered into a partnership agreement with JTG Daugherty Racing, based in North Carolina, starting with the 2006 season. JTG Daugherty Racing originated from ST Racing, which competes in the Craftsman Truck Series and the Xfinity Series, and is owned by Tad and Jodi Geschickter.

Among the changes to the No. 21 team was the promotion of Michael "Fatback" McSwain from crew chief to manager of racing operations. David Hyder, who previously worked with Schrader at BAM Racing, was hired as the crew chief for the 2006 season.

JTG Daugherty Racing fielded several entries, including the No. 21 Nextel Cup car driven by Ken Schrader, the No. 47 Clorox Ford Taurus in the Busch Series driven by Jon Wood, and the No. 59 Kingsford/Bush's Baked Beans Ford Taurus driven by Stacy Compton.

==== Bill Elliott (2007–2010) ====
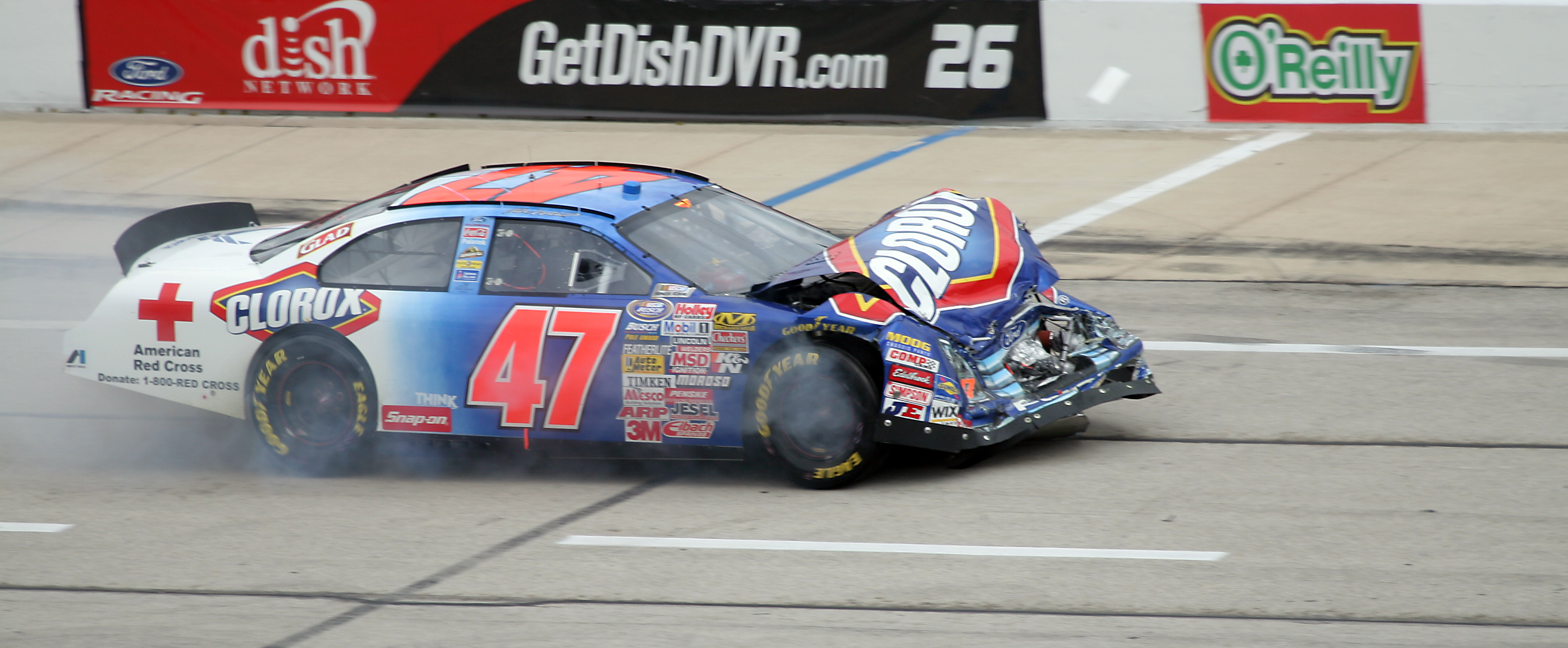
Jon Wood's 2007 Busch car after a wreck

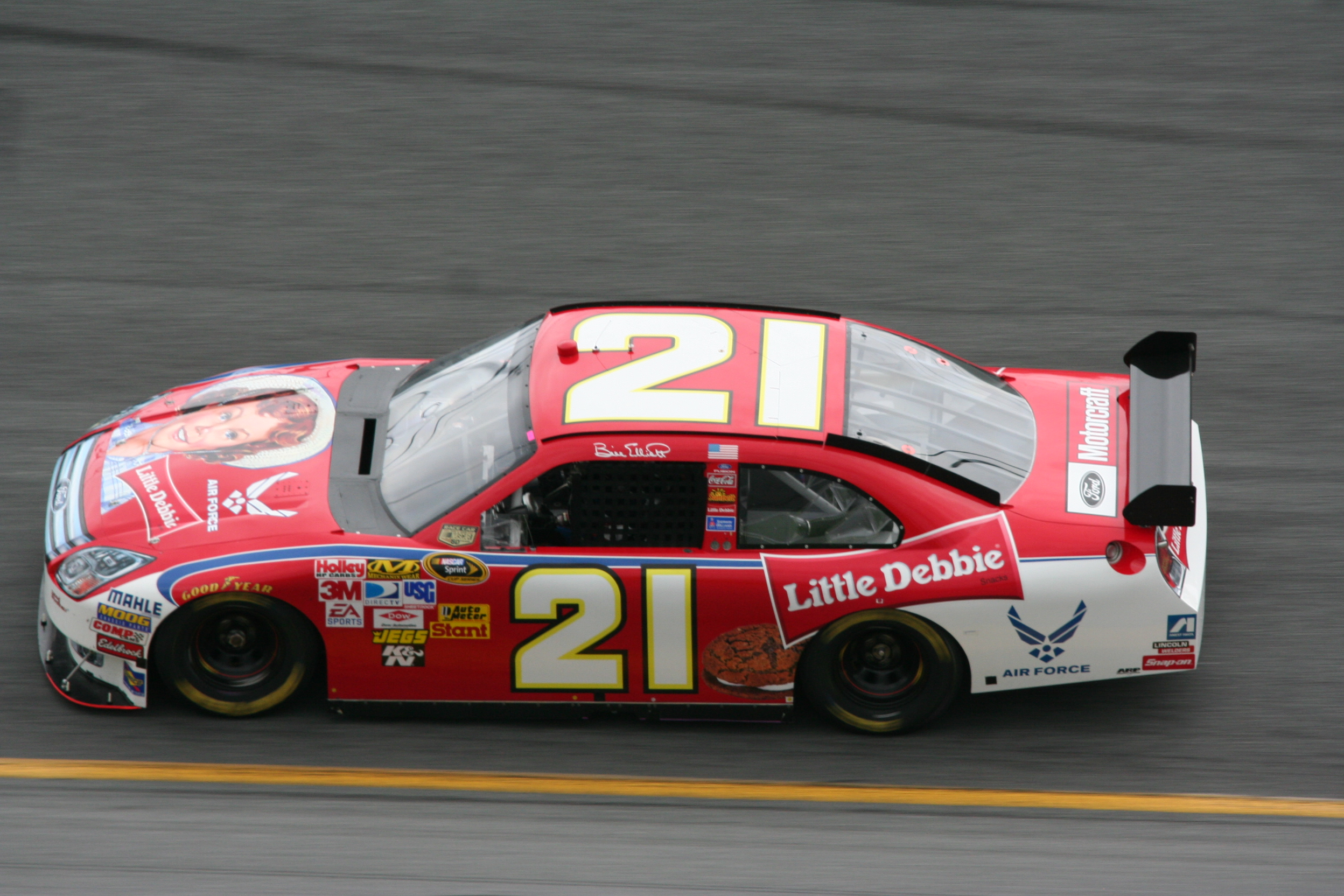
Bill Elliott's 2008 Cup car

In 2007, Schrader and young Jon Wood planned to share driving duties in the No. 21 car. Wood participated in one of the two races he attempted but was then pulled from both the No. 21 and his No. 47 Busch car due to medical issues. As a result, 1988 champion Bill Elliott was brought in to address qualifying and sponsorship challenges. The sponsors remained the same as in 2006. The Wood Brothers also entered a second car numbered 47 (JTG Daugherty Racing's car number) for two events: Las Vegas with Schrader and Kansas with Jon. Unfortunately, both drivers failed to qualify for their respective races.

In 2008, Elliot, Marcos Ambrose, and Jon Wood shared driving duties for the No. 21 car. Ambrose, who drove the JTG Daugherty No. 59, had committed to a partial schedule before the two teams ended their partnership. He recorded a best finish of third at Watkins Glen and had a strong performance in his debut race at Sonoma Raceway. Ambrose later began driving part-time for the JTG Daugherty Racing No. 47 team at Indy. When JTG switched to Toyota, he left the Wood Brothers team, taking sponsor McKee Foods with him. Jon Wood competed in two races that season, while Elliott participated in 24, achieving a best finish of 12th.

In 2009, the Wood Brothers competed in a partial schedule, participating in only 13 races after Air Force and McKee Foods switched to other teams, leaving Ford as the sole sponsor through their Motorcraft brand. The season featured four Top-10 qualifying efforts, with a season-best fourth place at Indianapolis. Bill Elliott's Motorcraft Ford Fusion achieved four Top-16 finishes, and the team earned over $1.3 million.

In 2010, the Wood Brothers returned to the racetrack to celebrate their 60th anniversary in NASCAR. They aimed for their fifth Daytona 500 victory at Daytona in February, with Bill Elliott driving the Motorcraft Ford Fusion. Quick Lane Tire and Auto Centers also joined as a sponsor for the season. Elliott competed in eleven races that year, while Roush Fenway Racing development driver Trevor Bayne made his Sprint Cup debut with the Wood Brothers in the AAA Texas 500 on November 7.

==== Trevor Bayne (2011–2014) ====
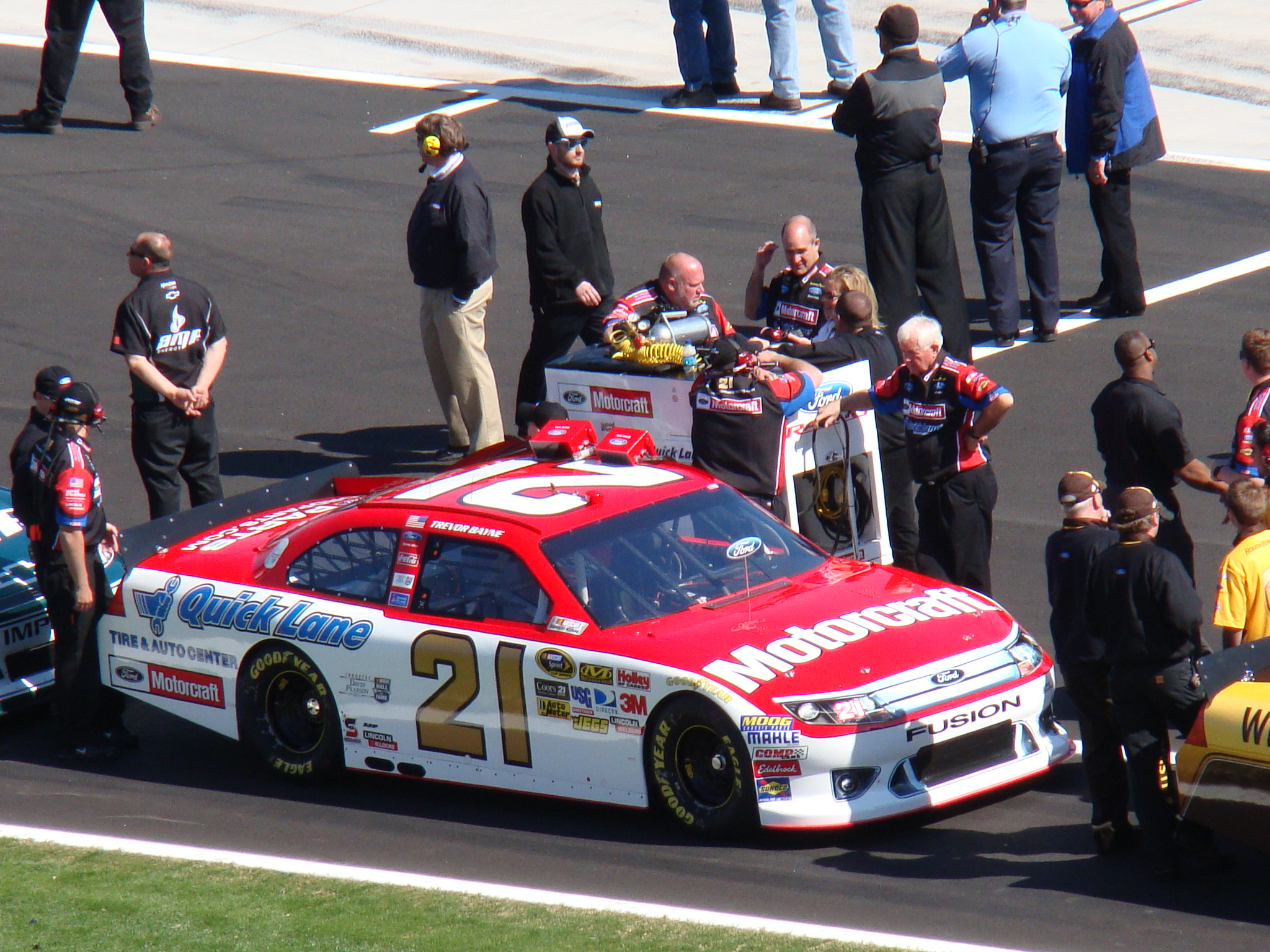
Bayne's 2011 Daytona 500 winning car

In 2011, Bayne became the youngest driver in Wood Brothers Racing history, taking the wheel of the No. 21 car for at least 17 races, including the first five of the season. He had a strong debut in the Cup Series in 2010, finishing 17th at Texas while remaining on the lead lap. Motorcraft/Quick Lane continued to sponsor the team throughout the 2011 season. On February 20, just a day after his 20th birthday, Bayne won the Daytona 500, marking Wood Brothers Racing's first victory since Elliott Sadler won at Bristol in 2001. This win attracted additional sponsorship from Camping World/Good Sam for several races, including the All-Star Race. Ricky Stenhouse Jr. replaced Bayne at the Coca-Cola 600 after he was diagnosed with what was initially thought to be Lyme disease but was later revealed to be multiple sclerosis.

The team lost its additional sponsorship for 2012, except for the All-Star Race, where Camping World/Good Sam returned as a sponsor. For the remainder of the season, the car, driven by Bayne, competed on a limited schedule with the Ford Motorcraft/Quick Lane sponsorship.

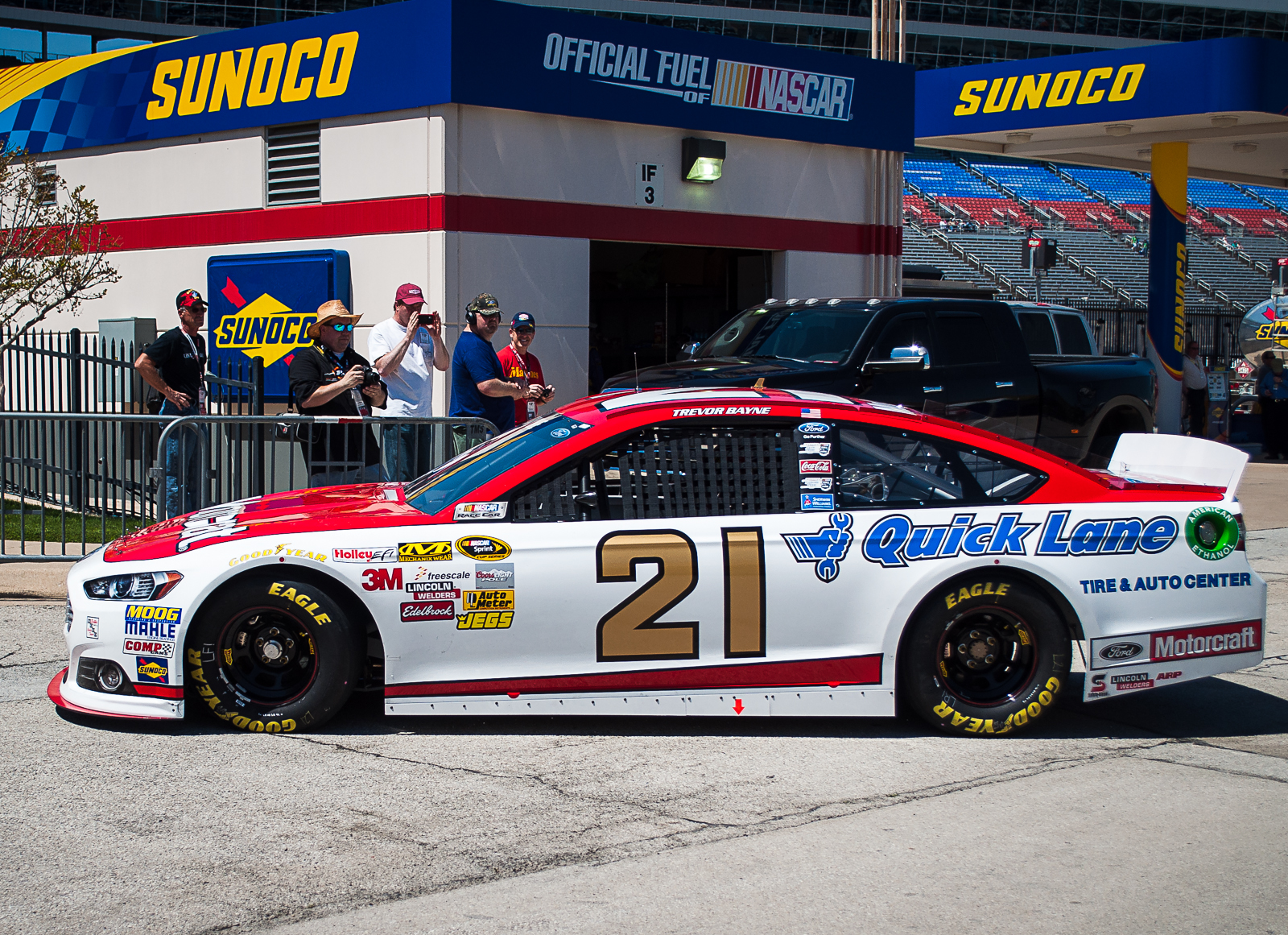
Bayne's 2013 Cup car at Texas Motor Speedway

Bayne continued to run a limited schedule in both 2013 and 2014, but the team did not return to victory lane. It was later announced that Bayne would compete full-time in Roush Fenway Racing's No. 6 Cup car in 2015.

==== Ryan Blaney (2015–2017) ====
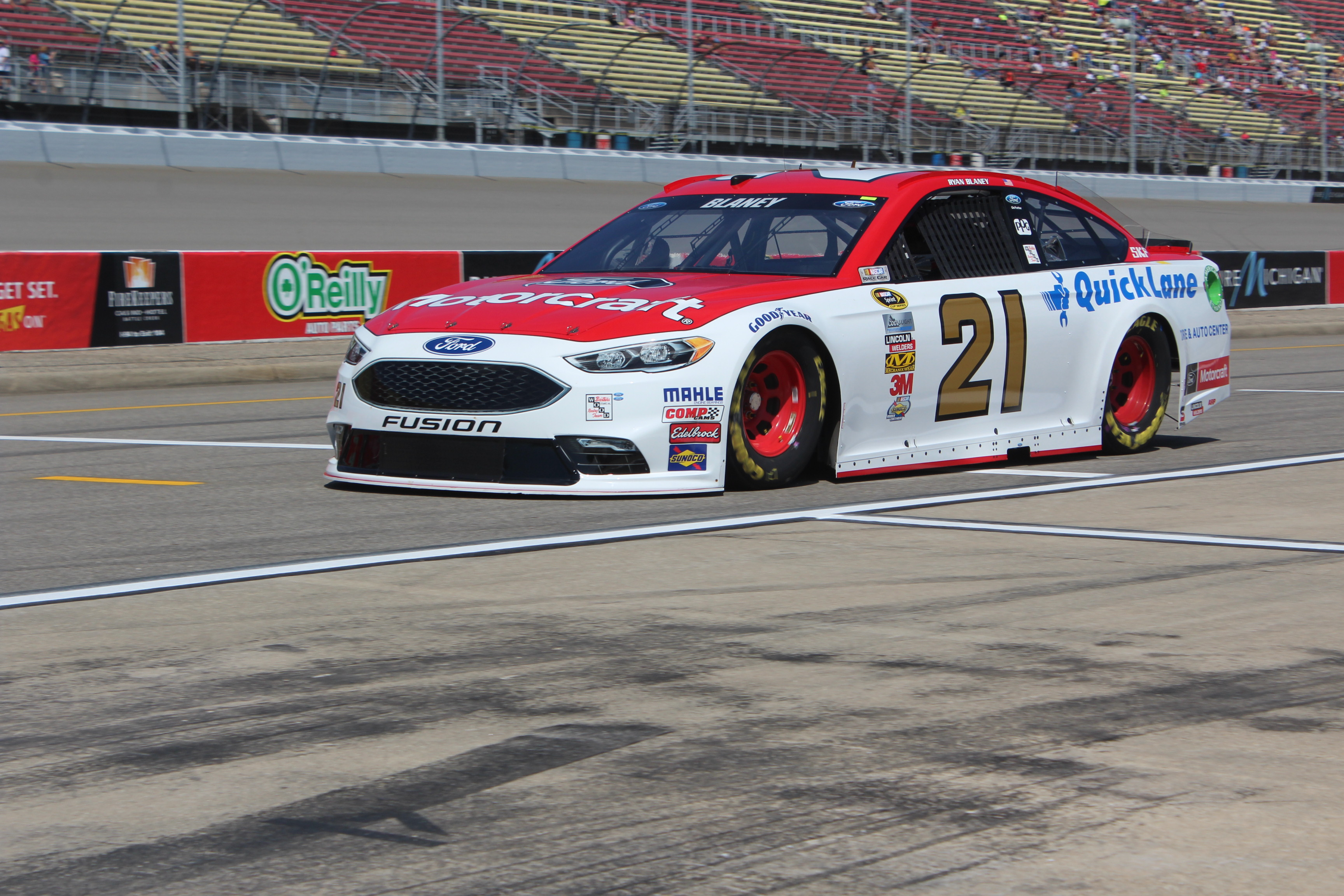
Ryan Blaney's 2016 Cup car at Michigan International Speedway

In 2015, Ryan Blaney was announced as the driver of the No. 21 car, marking an alliance between the Wood Brothers and Team Penske. The team's best result that season was a fourth-place finish at the Talladega spring race. Although Blaney only qualified for 16 races out of 19 attempts—an improvement from their 12-race schedules in 2013 and 2014—the team finished 41st in owner points, surpassing the No. 32, No. 26, and No. 62, all of which attempted the full schedule.

In 2016, Blaney returned for a full-time season, the team's first since 2008 and the first with a single driver since 2006. He achieved nine top-10 finishes and ended the season ranked 20th in points. In December 2016, Go Fas Racing announced that they would lease their charter to Wood Brothers Racing, guaranteeing the No. 21 a starting spot in every race of the 2017 season.

In 2017, Ryan Blaney began the season with a runner-up finish in the Daytona 500, which was won by fellow Ford driver Kurt Busch. He nearly won the Texas spring race, leading a race-high 148 laps, but a pit road mishap prevented him from taking the victory. Blaney also led two of the three stages in that race. Later, he came close to winning the Kansas spring race after winning the pole position and winning Stage 2, but ultimately finished fourth. Blaney secured his first career Cup Series victory at the Axalta Presents the Pocono 400, marking the Wood Brothers' first win since the 2011 Daytona 500, beating second-place driver Kevin Harvick. The win was well-received, with competitors surrounding the No. 21 in a show of respect and joy during the cool-down lap. With 14 top-ten finishes, Blaney advanced to the Round of 8 in the playoffs and finished the season ninth in points. On July 26, 2017, it was announced that Ryan Blaney would move to a third car for Team Penske in 2018.

==== Paul Menard (2018–2019) ====
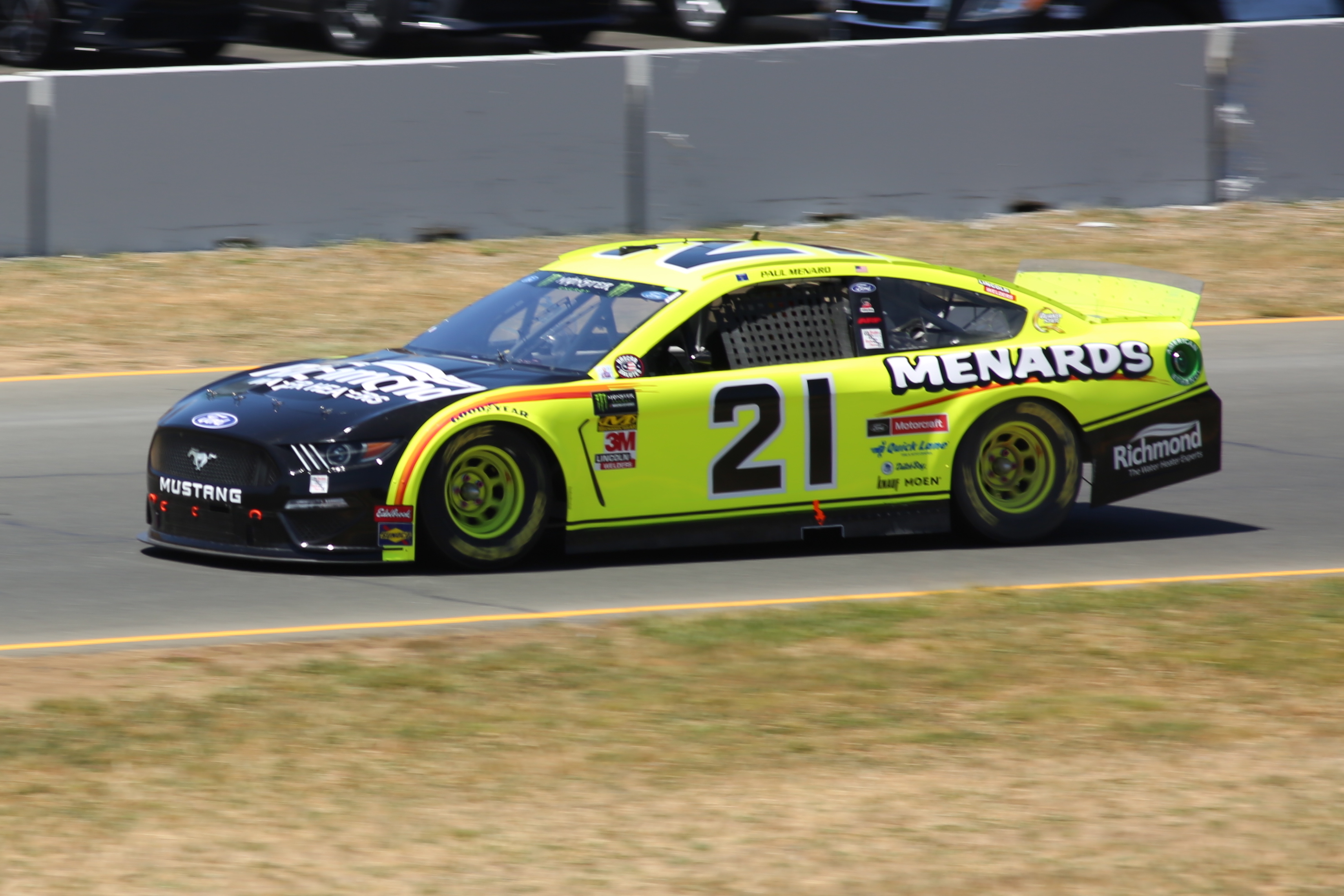
Paul Menard's 2019 Cup car at Sonoma Raceway

In 2018, Paul Menard would transfer from Richard Childress Racing to the No. 21 car, which would continue to carry the Menards sponsorship as part of the agreement with Penske. Menard achieved seven top-10 finishes, including a fifth-place finish at the Michigan June race, and ended the season ranked 19th in the drivers' standings.

In 2019, Team co-founder Glen Wood died on January 18 at the age of 93. Meanwhile, Menard achieved only four top-10 finishes and finished 19th in points. On July 12, 2019, Menard announced that he had signed a contract for the 2020 season, indicating his intention to stay with the Wood Brothers team. However, on September 10, he announced that he would retire from full-time racing at the end of the 2019 season.

==== Matt DiBenedetto (2020–2021) ====
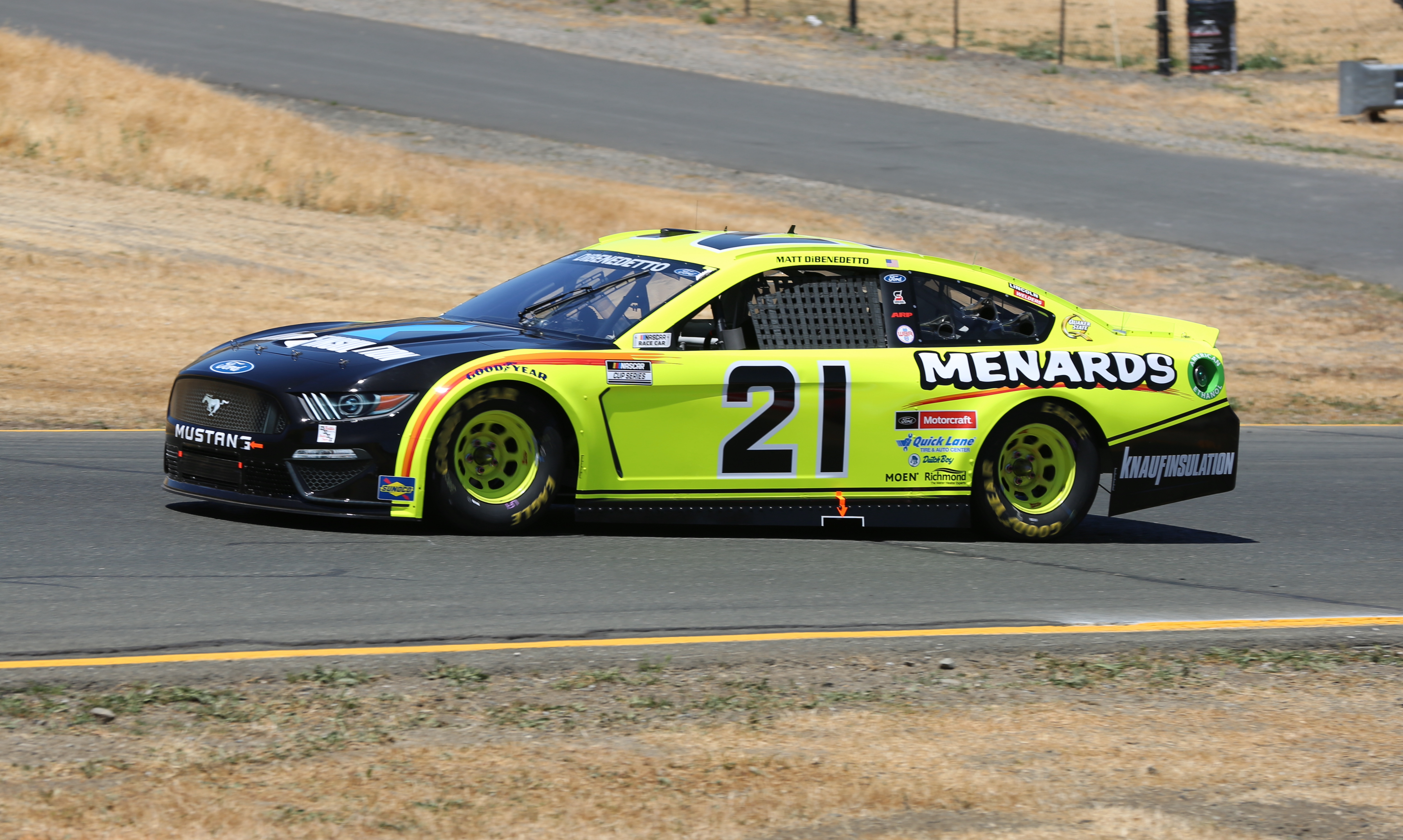
Matt DiBenedetto in the No. 21 at Sonoma Raceway in 2021

In 2020, Matt DiBenedetto replaced Paul Menard for the season. On July 15, 2020, DiBenedetto won the All-Star Open, qualifying for the team's third-ever All-Star Race, where he finished 13th in the main event. In collaboration with Penske, the team announced that DiBenedetto would drive the car in 2021, after which Austin Cindric would take over in 2022. On December 30, 2020, Bob Pockrass reported that Wood Brothers Racing had purchased the charter they had leased from Go Fas Racing since 2017.

Harrison Burton (2022–2024)

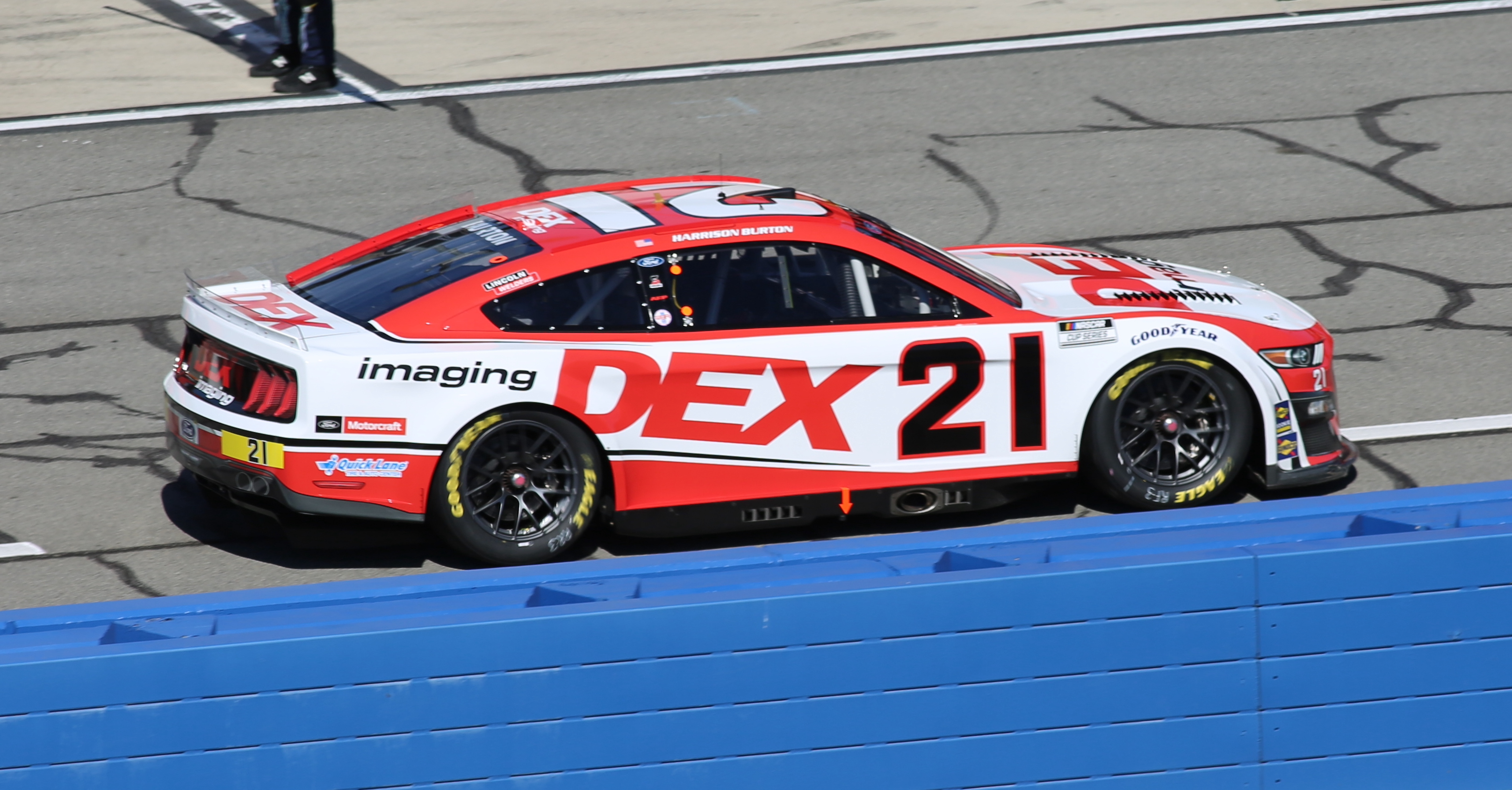
Harrison Burton in the No. 21 at Auto Club Speedway in 2022

On July 15, 2021, it was confirmed that Matt DiBenedetto would not be returning to Wood Brothers Racing in 2022. On the same day, Harrison Burton was announced as DiBenedetto's replacement. (Although Austin Cindric was originally announced to drive the No. 21 car for the 2022 season, he was instead moved to Team Penske's No. 2 cup car, replacing Brad Keselowski.)

In 2024, Burton secured his first career victory at the Coke Zero Sugar 400, marking the 100th win for Wood Brothers Racing. He was eliminated from the playoffs following the Round of 16. On October 25, crew chief Jeremy Bullins departed from Wood Brothers Racing and was replaced by Grant Hutchens for the remainder of the season.

==== Josh Berry (2025–2026) ====
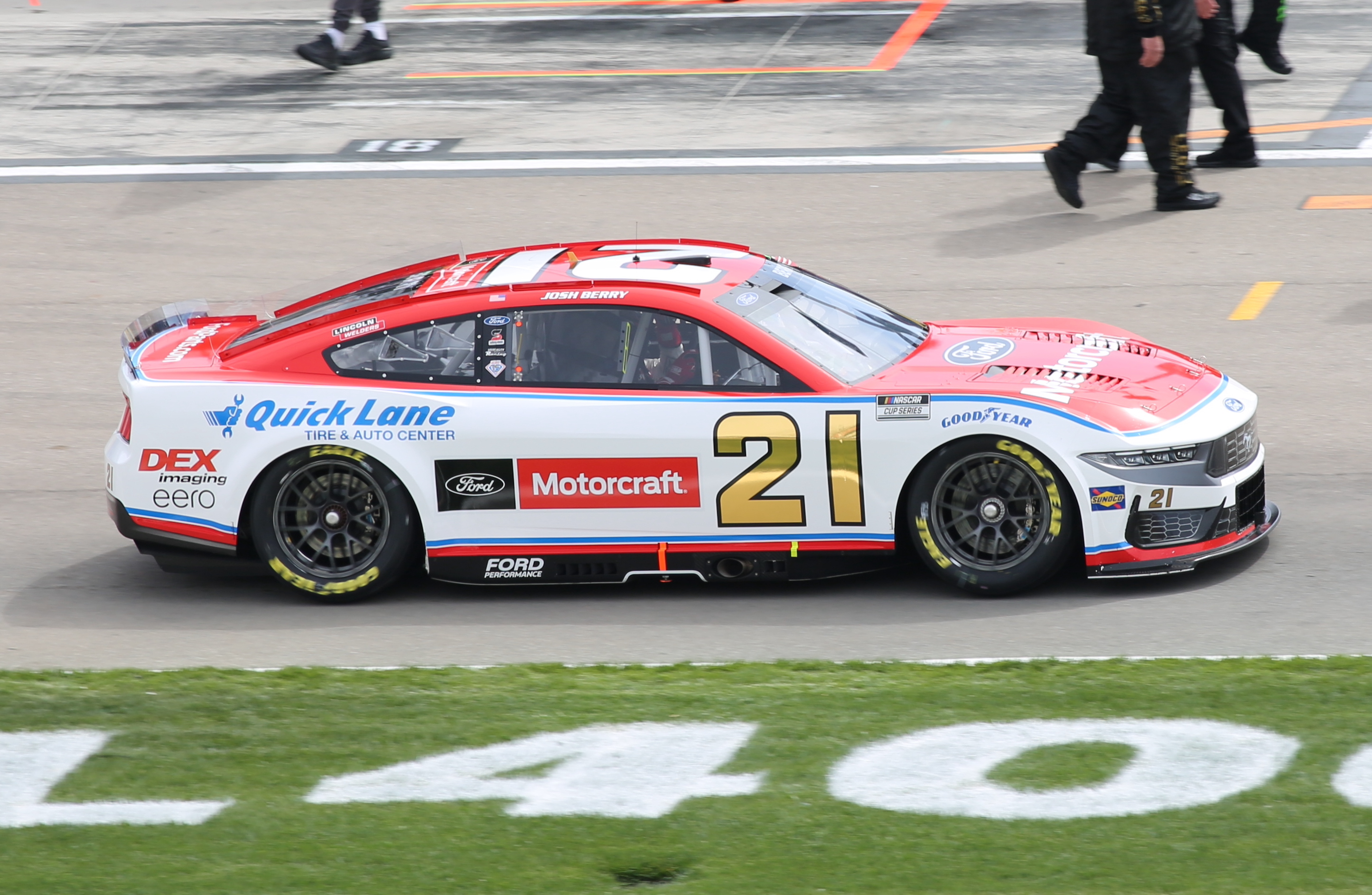
Josh Berry in the No.21 at Las Vegas Motor Speedway in 2025.

On July 3, 2024, it was announced that Burton would not return to Wood Brothers Racing in 2025, with Josh Berry named as his replacement.

Berry started the 2025 season with a 37th place DNF at the 2025 Daytona 500. A month later, he scored his first Cup Series win at Las Vegas, and the 101st win for Wood Brothers Racing. This win marked the first time since the 1986 and 1987 seasons that the Wood Brothers won in back to back seasons (both won with Kyle Petty). Berry was eliminated after the Round of 16 of the playoffs as a result of three consecutive DNFs.

Berry started the 2026 season with a 37th place DNF at the 2026 Daytona 500. On June 10, 2026, Berry announced that he would not return to the Wood Brothers Racing in 2027. With an unforeseeable future for 2027, he went on a summer-streak of consistent top-ten finishes.

==== Jesse Love (2027) ====
On June 17, 2026, it was announced that Jesse Love would drive the No. 21 in 2027.

== Craftsman Truck Series ==
=== Truck No. 19 history ===
The team ran a single race in 2006 at Atlanta, with Kelly Bires driving the No. 19 truck. Bires started in 29th place and finished 19th. (Note: Michael "Fatback" McSwain is listed as the owner in that race.)

=== Truck No.09/No. 20 history ===
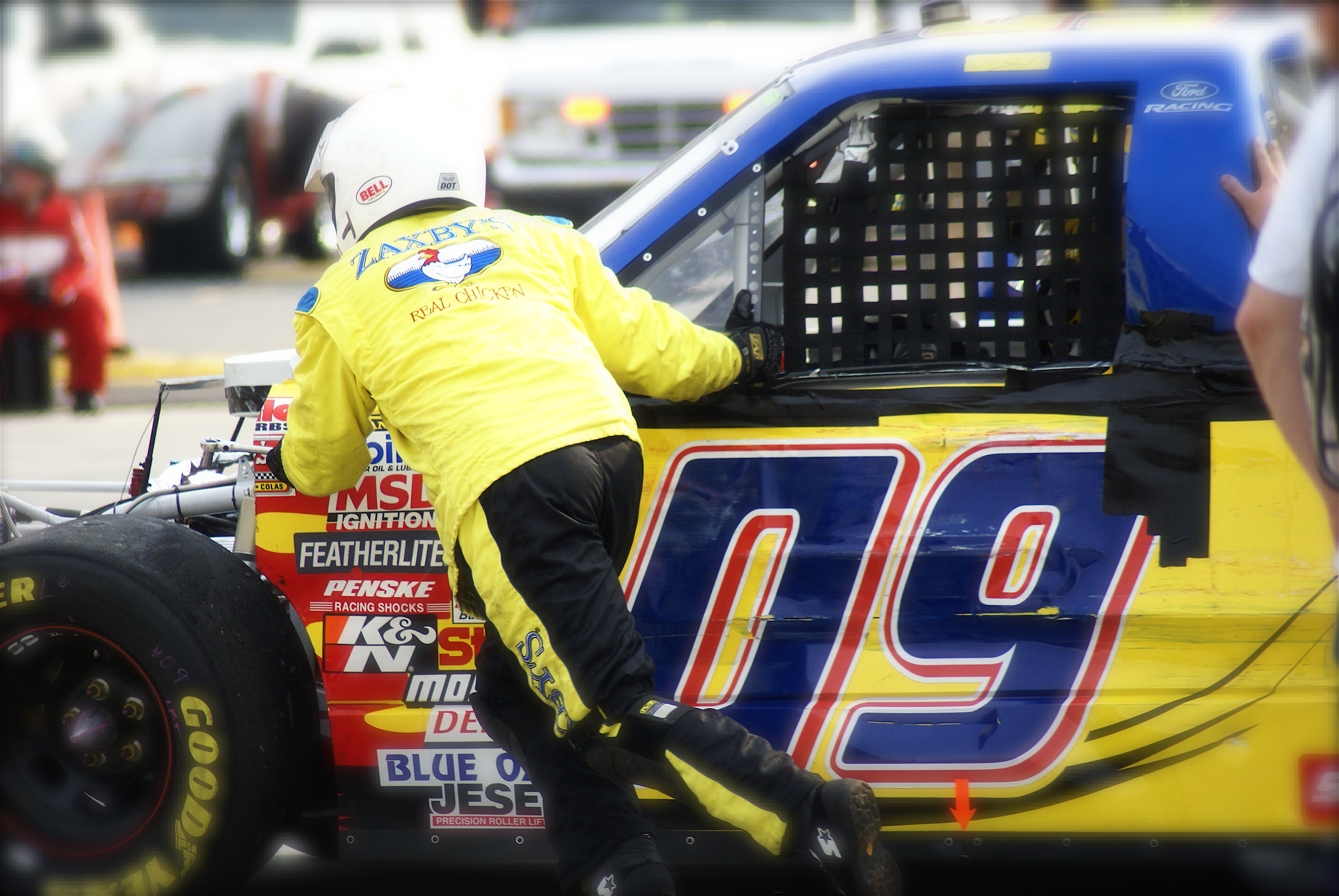
The No. 09 truck piloted by Joey Clanton after a wreck in Martinsville Speedway in 2007.

The No. 20 truck made its debut in 2006 at the GM Flex Fuel 250, sponsored by the United States Air Force in partnership with JTG Racing. Jon Wood drove the truck at Daytona and Fontana, finishing 16th and 9th, respectively. Bobby East competed in one race at Atlanta, where he finished 23rd. For the remainder of the season, JTG Racing's development driver Marcos Ambrose took over, earning one pole position and two third-place finishes. In 2007,á the truck's number changed to No. 09. Joey Clanton, who brought Zaxby's as a sponsor, shared driving duties with former Busch Series veteran Stacy Compton. Clanton went on and win ROTY that year despite only running a few races.

A year later, in 2008, Clanton brought both the No. 09 and Zaxby's sponsorship to Roush Fenway Racing, which allowed JTG Racing/Wood Brothers to revert to using the No. 20. However, the truck team only lasted for eight races before shutting down due to a lack of funding.

=== Truck No. 21 history ===
The No. 21 truck debuted in 2006 with sponsorship from Edy's Ice Cream and State Fair Corn Dogs at Daytona, driven initially by Stacy Compton for the first two races. Afterward, Jon Wood took over driving duties at Atlanta, followed by Bobby East, who drove the truck for the remainder of the season and achieved a best finish of eleventh place.

East was not retained for the 2007 season. The team planned to run development driver Kelly Bires in nineteen races, with Mark Martin driving the remaining six. Late in the season, Bires moved up to the Busch Series, replacing Jon Wood, who took over his spot in the No. 21 truck.

In 2008, Jon and Keven Wood shared the No. 21 truck, which was sponsored by the United States Air Force. However, in December of that year, Keven Wood announced in an interview that the team had ceased its Truck operation due to a lack of sponsorship.

== Indianapolis 500 ==
The Wood Brothers Racing Team gained recognition in NASCAR for their exceptional pit work, attracting the attention of racers across various motorsports. As a result, efficient pit stops became a trend in other auto racing competitions.

In 1965, IndyCar teams took notice when Lotus owner Colin Chapman hired the Wood Brothers to handle pit stops for his car, driven by Scottish Formula One star Jim Clark, during the Indy 500. This was the first instance of a NASCAR stock car crew servicing an IndyCar team. Thanks to their efforts, Clark improved his track position and ultimately drove into victory lane, winning the race with the Wood Brothers as his crew.

== Motorsports career results ==
(key) (Bold – Pole position awarded by qualifying time. Italics – Pole position earned by points standings or practice time. * – Most laps led.)

=== NASCAR Cup Series ===
==== Car No. 21 results ====
Year	Driver	No.	Make	1	2	3	4	5	6	7	8	9	10	11	12	13	14	15	16	17	18	19	20	21	22	23	24	25	26	27	28	29	30	31	32	33	34	35	36	Owners	Pts
1972	A. J. Foyt	21	Mercury	**RSD**; 28	DAY; 1*	RCH	**ONT**; 1*	CAR	ATL; 2	BRI																								**TWS**; 2						(Note: unknown)	
1972	David Pearson	21	Mercury								**DAR**; 1*	NWS		TAL; 1*	CLT; 25	DOV	MCH; 1*	RSD	TWS	DAY; 1*	BRI	TRN	**ATL**; 3*	TAL; 26	MCH; 1*	NSV	DAR; 2		DOV; 1*	MAR; 3	NWS	**CLT**; 3	**CAR**; 4							(Note: unknown)	
1972	David Pearson	21	Ford										MAR; 8																											(Note: unknown)	
1973	David Pearson	21	Mercury	**RSD**; 22	DAY; 33	RCH	**CAR**; 1*	BRI	ATL; 1*	NWS	**DAR**; 1*	**MAR**; 1	TAL; 1*	NSV	CLT; 2	**DOV**; 1*	TWS	RSD	MCH; 1	DAY; 1*	BRI	ATL; 1*	TAL; 3*	NSV	**DAR**; 2	RCH	**DOV**; 1*	NWS	MAR; 31	**CLT**; 36	CAR; 1*										
1974	David Pearson	21	Mercury	**RSD**; 3	**DAY**; 35	RCH	CAR; 34	BRI	**ATL**; 2*	DAR; 1*	NWS	MAR	**TAL**; 1*	NSV	**DOV**; 2	**CLT**; 1*	RSD	**MCH**; 3	**DAY**; 1	BRI	NSV	ATL; 2*	POC; 4	**TAL**; 2	**MCH**; 1*	DAR; 25	RCH	DOV; 30	NWS	MAR	**CLT**; 1*	CAR; 1	ONT; 2								
1975	David Pearson	21	Mercury	RSD; 2	DAY; 4*	RCH	CAR; 2	BRI	ATL; 3	NWS	**DAR**; 7*	MAR; 20	TAL; 2	NSV	**DOV**; 1*	**CLT**; 3	RSD	MCH; 1*	DAY; 20	NSV	POC; 1*	TAL; 39	**MCH**; 2	**DAR**; 27	DOV; 26	NWS	MAR; 23	**CLT**; 2	RCH	CAR; 25	BRI	ATL; 4	**ONT**; 2								
1976	David Pearson	21	Mercury	RSD; 1*	DAY; 1	CAR; 29	RCH	BRI	ATL; 1	NWS	**DAR**; 1	MAR; 3	TAL; 37	NSV	DOV; 2	**CLT**; 1*	**RSD**; 1	MCH; 1	DAY; 2	NSV	POC; 4*	TAL; 28	**MCH**; 1	BRI	**DAR**; 1*	RCH	DOV; 3	MAR; 19	NWS	**CLT**; 6	**CAR**; 6	ATL; 2	**ONT**; 1*								
1977	David Pearson	21	Mercury	RSD; 1	DAY; 21	RCH	CAR; 32	ATL; 2	NWS	**DAR**; 4*	BRI	MAR; 5	TAL; 22	NSV	DOV; 2*	**CLT**; 2	RSD; 2	**MCH**; 4	DAY; 5	NSV	POC; 28	TAL; 37	**MCH**; 2	BRI	DAR; 1	RCH	DOV; 2	MAR; 3	NWS	**CLT**; 3	CAR; 27	ATL; 2	ONT; 5								
1978	David Pearson	21	Mercury	**RSD**; 3	DAY; 34	RCH	CAR; 1*	ATL; 21	BRI	DAR; 29	NWS	MAR; 21	TAL; 35	DOV; 1	**CLT**; 5	NSV	**RSD**; 27	**MCH**; 2	DAY; 1*	NSV	POC; 2	TAL; 5	**MCH**; 1	BRI	**DAR**; 28	RCH	DOV; 4	MAR; 25	NWS	**CLT**; 5	CAR; 24	ATL; 32	ONT; 38								
1979	David Pearson	21	Mercury	**RSD**; 2	DAY; 37	CAR; 23	RCH	ATL; 18	NWS	BRI	DAR; 22																														
1979	Neil Bonnett	21	Mercury									MAR; 25	TAL; 17*	NSV	DOV; 1	**CLT**; 25	TWS	RSD; 28	**MCH**; 4	DAY; 1*	NSV	POC; 8	**TAL**; 34	MCH; 33	BRI	DAR; 32	RCH	DOV; 21	MAR; 18	**CLT**; 31	NWS	CAR; 29	ATL; 1	ONT; 6							
1980	Neil Bonnett	21	Mercury	RSD; 34	DAY; 3	RCH	CAR; 6	ATL; 41	BRI	DAR; 36	NWS	MAR; 6	TAL; 27	NSV	DOV; 18	CLT; 5	TWS	RSD; 2	MCH; 4	DAY; 34	NSV	POC; 1*	TAL; 1	MCH; 2	BRI	DAR; 5	RCH	DOV; 6	NWS	MAR; 19	CLT; 30	CAR; 25	ATL; 2	ONT; 2							
1981	Neil Bonnett	21	Ford	RSD; 27	DAY; 33	RCH	CAR; 4	ATL; 28	BRI	NWS	DAR; 29	MAR; 2	TAL; 32	NSV	DOV; 13*	**CLT**; 29	TWS	RSD; 4	MCH; 9	DAY; 30	NSV	POC; 34	TAL; 37	MCH; 28	BRI	DAR; 1*	RCH	DOV; 1*	MAR; 4	NWS	CLT; 29*	CAR; 35	ATL; 1*	RSD; 33							
1982	Neil Bonnett	21	Ford	DAY; 25	RCH; 7	BRI	ATL; 27	CAR; 19	DAR; 24	NWS	MAR; 3	TAL; 19	NSV	DOV; 19	CLT; 1	POC	RSD; 5	MCH; 11	DAY; 32	NSV	POC	TAL; 16	MCH; 9	BRI	DAR; 34	RCH; 5	DOV; 21	NWS	CLT; 28	MAR; 22	CAR; 3	ATL; 11	RSD; 4								
1983	Buddy Baker	21	Ford	DAY; 3	RCH; 10	CAR; 32	ATL; 3	DAR; 32	NWS	MAR; 31	TAL; 25	NSV	DOV; 5	BRI	**CLT**; 7	RSD	POC	MCH; 7	DAY; 1*	NSV	POC	TAL; 28	MCH; 10	BRI	DAR; 6	RCH; 7	DOV; 25	MAR; 22	NWS	CLT; 6	CAR; 29	ATL; 2	RSD; 20								
1984	Buddy Baker	21	Ford	DAY; 38	RCH	CAR; 5	**ATL**; 23	BRI	NWS	DAR; 33	MAR; 10	TAL; 3	NSV	DOV; 7	CLT; 7	RSD	POC; 35	MCH; 10	DAY; 41	NSV	POC	TAL; 2*	MCH; 8	BRI	DAR; 3	RCH; 19	DOV; 26	MAR; 6	CLT; 29	NWS; 10	CAR; 7	ATL; 20									
1984	Bobby Rahal	21	Ford																														RSD; 40								
1985	Kyle Petty	7	Ford	DAY; 37	RCH; 7	CAR; 5	ATL; 11	BRI; 6	DAR; 12	NWS; 12	MAR; 11	TAL; 2	DOV; 3	CLT; 14	RSD; 5	POC; 14	MCH; 12	DAY; 5	POC; 7	TAL; 25	MCH; 4	BRI; 16	DAR; 10	RCH; 8	DOV; 15	MAR; 5	NWS; 28	CLT; 22	CAR; 31	ATL; 29	RSD; 27										
1986	Kyle Petty	7	Ford	DAY; 16	RCH; 1	CAR; 11	ATL; 28	BRI; 9	DAR; 9	NWS; 8	MAR; 5	TAL; 31	DOV; 19	CLT; 20	RSD; 41	POC; 8	MCH; 32	DAY; 5	POC; 8	TAL; 9	GLN; 9	MCH; 28	BRI; 30	DAR; 14	RCH; 20	DOV; 3	MAR; 6	NWS; 14	CLT; 13	CAR; 10	ATL; 7	RSD; 15									
1987	Kyle Petty	21	Ford	DAY; 35	CAR; 16	RCH; 7	ATL; 9	DAR; 13	NWS; 2	BRI; 7	MAR; 12	TAL; 3	CLT; 1	DOV; 24	POC; 3	RSD; 24	MCH; 3	DAY; 17	POC; 20	TAL; 9	GLN; 12	MCH; 27	BRI; 28	DAR; 14	RCH; 18	DOV; 23	MAR; 9	NWS; 6	CLT; 10	CAR; 6	RSD; 3	ATL; 13									
1988	Kyle Petty	21	Ford	DAY; 18	RCH; 18	CAR; 19	ATL; 5	DAR; 40	BRI; 7	NWS; 5	MAR; 17	TAL; 8	CLT; 16	DOV; 33	RSD; 14	POC; 12	MCH; 33	DAY; 24	POC; 18	TAL; 15	GLN; 34	MCH; 8	BRI; 13	DAR; 28	RCH; 6	DOV; 6	MAR; 22	CLT; 11	NWS; 16	CAR; 9	PHO; 17	ATL; 22									
1989	Neil Bonnett	21	Ford	DAY; 42	CAR; 14	ATL; 7	RCH; 21	DAR; 39	BRI; 12	NWS; 13	MAR; 10	TAL; 9	CLT; 7	DOV; 7	SON; 11	POC; 8	MCH; 24	DAY; 21	POC; 23	TAL; 10	GLN; 36	MCH; 15	BRI; 9	DAR; 15	RCH; 7	DOV; 26				CAR; 6	PHO; 34	ATL; 9									
1989	Tommy Ellis	21	Ford																								MAR; 29	CLT; 18	NWS; 16												
1990	Neil Bonnett	21	Ford	DAY; 11	RCH; 25	CAR; 36	ATL; 18	DAR; 30																																	
1990	Dale Jarrett	21	Ford						BRI; 11	NWS; 14	MAR; 30	TAL; 34	CLT; 32	DOV; 12	SON; 14	POC; 31	MCH; 34	DAY; 8	POC; 18	TAL; 39	GLN; 20	MCH; 10	BRI; 7	DAR; 28	RCH; 29	DOV; 6	MAR; 10	NWS; 19	CLT; 10	CAR; 16	PHO; 30	ATL; 4									
1991	Dale Jarrett	21	Ford	DAY; 6	RCH; 21	CAR; 11	ATL; 20	DAR; 39	BRI; 7	NWS; 25	MAR; 12	TAL; 35	CLT; 5	DOV; 35	SON; 41	POC; 19	MCH; 12	DAY; 18	POC; 6	TAL; 8	GLN; 5	MCH; 1	BRI; 28	DAR; 25	RCH; 20	DOV; 34	MAR; 18	NWS; 9	CLT; 26	CAR; 25	PHO; 35	ATL; 16								17th	3124
1992	Morgan Shepherd	21	Ford	DAY; 2	CAR; 13	RCH; 10	ATL; 10	DAR; 13	BRI; 7	NWS; 12	MAR; 6	TAL; 9	CLT; 29	DOV; 10	SON; 29	POC; 25	MCH; 12	DAY; 19	POC; 15	TAL; 13	GLN; 2	MCH; 10	BRI; 13	DAR; 31	RCH; 7	DOV; 5	MAR; 21	NWS; 17	CLT; 13	CAR; 13	PHO; 38	ATL; 11								14th	3549
1993	Morgan Shepherd	21	Ford	DAY; 7	CAR; 35	RCH; 14	ATL; 1	DAR; 10	BRI; 7	NWS; 8	MAR; 19	TAL; 15	SON; 14	CLT; 9	DOV; 9	POC; 7	MCH; 7	DAY; 14	NHA; 14	POC; 4	TAL; 7	GLN; 28	MCH; 2	BRI; 13	DAR; 8	RCH; 30	DOV; 9	MAR; 9	NWS; 32	CLT; 14	CAR; 11	PHO; 11	ATL; 32							7th	3807
1994	Morgan Shepherd	21	Ford	DAY; 5	CAR; 16	RCH; 15	ATL; 2	DAR; 32	BRI; 18	NWS; 22	MAR; 5	TAL; 9	SON; 7	CLT; 28	DOV; 25	POC; 4	MCH; 5	DAY; 9	NHA; 6	POC; 5	TAL; 15	IND; 10	GLN; 16	MCH; 26	BRI; 18	DAR; 3	RCH; 14	DOV; 10	MAR; 15	NWS; 30	CLT; 2	CAR; 3	PHO; 12	ATL; 6						7th	4029
1995	Morgan Shepherd	21	Ford	DAY; 10	CAR; 34	RCH; 15	ATL; 6	DAR; 8	BRI; 20	NWS; 19	MAR; 31	TAL; 3	SON; 15	CLT; 11	DOV; 26	POC; 7	MCH; 5	DAY; 24	NHA; 2	POC; 24	TAL; 4	IND; 10	GLN; 30	MCH; 16	BRI; 17	DAR; 11	RCH; 27	DOV; 33	MAR; 19	NWS; 23	CLT; 14	CAR; 18	PHO; 7	ATL; 22						11th	3618
1996	Michael Waltrip	21	Ford	DAY; 10	CAR; 35	RCH; 36	ATL; 9	DAR; 29	BRI; 10	NWS; 17	MAR; 17	TAL; 5	SON; 22	CLT; 8	DOV; 11	POC; 14	MCH; 32	DAY; 7	NHA; 10	POC; 13	TAL; 42	IND; 28	GLN; 7	MCH; 25	BRI; 6	DAR; 33	RCH; 14	DOV; 9	MAR; 14	NWS; 12	CLT; 9	CAR; 14	PHO; 16	ATL; 11						14th	3535
1997	Michael Waltrip	21	Ford	DAY; 32	CAR; 26	RCH; 27	ATL; 7	DAR; 7	TEX; 9	BRI; 21	MAR; 26	SON; 7	TAL; 14	CLT; 17	DOV; 7	POC; 13	MCH; 16	CAL; 11	DAY; 35	NHA; 29	POC; 22	IND; 39	GLN; 25	MCH; 22	BRI; 25	DAR; 9	RCH; 35	NHA; 32	DOV; 42	MAR; 36	CLT; 24	TAL; 28	CAR; 14	PHO; 26	ATL; 13					19th	3173
1998	Michael Waltrip	21	Ford	DAY; 9	CAR; 34	LVS; 14	ATL; 18	DAR; 16	BRI; 9	TEX; 9	MAR; 21	TAL; 21	CAL; 20	CLT; 18	DOV; 14	RCH; 40	MCH; 21	POC; 14	SON; 34	NHA; 24	POC; 10	IND; 21	GLN; 28	MCH; 22	BRI; 16	NHA; 27	DAR; 17	RCH; 26	DOV; 20	MAR; 20	CLT; 13	TAL; 9	DAY; 31	PHO; DNQ	CAR; 22	ATL; 22				19th	3374
1999	Elliott Sadler	21	Ford	DAY; 40	CAR; 38	LVS; 33	ATL; 31	DAR; 36	TEX; 10	BRI; 26	MAR; 28	TAL; 29	CAL; 21	RCH; 23	CLT; 17	DOV; 27	MCH; 36	POC; 20	SON; 18	DAY; 22	NHA; 20	POC; 21	IND; 21	GLN; 18	MCH; 11	BRI; 35	DAR; 14	RCH; 17	NHA; 14	DOV; 12	MAR; 25	CLT; 26	TAL; 21	CAR; 18	PHO; 27	HOM; 18	ATL; 16			24th	3191
2000	Elliott Sadler	21	Ford	DAY; 38	CAR; 28	LVS; 41	ATL; 14	DAR; 12	BRI; 41	TEX; 39	MAR; 29	TAL; DNQ	CAL; 43	RCH; 24	CLT; 21	DOV; 16	MCH; 27	POC; 16	SON; 38	DAY; 18	NHA; 16	POC; 29	IND; 34	GLN; 28	MCH; 40	BRI; 7	DAR; 18	RCH; 42	NHA; 13	DOV; 26	MAR; 32	CLT; 16	TAL; 17	CAR; 19	PHO; 30	HOM; 28	ATL; 42			31st	2781
2001	Elliott Sadler	21	Ford	DAY; 18	CAR; 11	LVS; 20	ATL; 31	DAR; 17	BRI; 1	TEX; 16	MAR; 21	TAL; 39	CAL; 23	RCH; 23	CLT; 19	DOV; 18	MCH; 40	POC; 18	SON; 17	DAY; 3	CHI; 15	NHA; 40	POC; 26	IND; 23	GLN; 30	MCH; 15	BRI; 11	DAR; 29	RCH; 31	DOV; 14	KAN; 23	CLT; 37	MAR; 17	TAL; 40	PHO; 33	CAR; 23	HOM; 36	ATL; 24	NHA; 19	22nd	3471
2002	Elliott Sadler	21	Ford	DAY; 2	CAR; 31	LVS; 28	ATL; 19	DAR; 2	BRI; 41	TEX; 17	MAR; 28	TAL; 40	CAL; 39	RCH; 21	CLT; 33	DOV; 10	POC; 15	MCH; 26	SON; 6	DAY; 12	CHI; 21	NHA; 10	POC; 21	IND; 35	GLN; 43	MCH; 27	BRI; 42	DAR; 19	RCH; 34	NHA; 35	DOV; 25	KAN; 18	TAL; 36	CLT; 19	MAR; 34	ATL; 18	CAR; 16	PHO; 10	HOM; 9	24th	3418
2003	Ricky Rudd	21	Ford	DAY; 15	CAR; 11	LVS; 19	ATL; 35	DAR; 15	BRI; 4	TEX; 26	TAL; 42	MAR; 11	CAL; 24	RCH; 34	CLT; 33	DOV; 17	POC; 37	MCH; 43	SON; 15	DAY; 3	CHI; 13	NHA; 12	POC; 39	IND; 38	GLN; 21	MCH; 29	BRI; 33	DAR; 16	RCH; 3	NHA; 2	DOV; 11	TAL; 36	KAN; 10	CLT; 23	MAR; 15	ATL; 31	PHO; 17	CAR; 40	HOM; 31	23rd	3521
2004	Ricky Rudd	21	Ford	DAY; 18	CAR; 19	LVS; 28	ATL; 31	DAR; 33	BRI; 37	TEX; 22	MAR; 20	**TAL**; 17	CAL; 17	RCH; 11	CLT; 26	DOV; 30	POC; 19	MCH; 12	SON; 35	DAY; 17	CHI; 32	NHA; 39	POC; 12	IND; 28	GLN; 8	MCH; 24	BRI; 40	CAL; 17	RCH; 21	NHA; 37	DOV; 12	TAL; 12	KAN; 2	CLT; 16	MAR; 14	ATL; 12	PHO; 19	DAR; 16	HOM; 9	25th	3615
2005	Ricky Rudd	21	Ford	DAY; 24	CAL; 41	LVS; 37	ATL; 33	BRI; 25	MAR; 7	TEX; 8	PHO; 34	TAL; 30	DAR; 13	RCH; 11	CLT; 35	DOV; 40	POC; 28	MCH; 33	SON; 2	DAY; 13	CHI; 7	NHA; 23	POC; 10	IND; 41	GLN; 16	MCH; 19	BRI; 4	CAL; 9	RCH; 38	NHA; 20	DOV; 12	TAL; 18	KAN; 9	CLT; 9	MAR; 11	ATL; 17	TEX; 13	PHO; 20	HOM; 37	21st	3667
2006	Ken Schrader	21	Ford	DAY; 9	CAL; 28	LVS; 41	ATL; 24	BRI; 24	MAR; 40	TEX; 16	PHO; 16	TAL; 42	RCH; 16	DAR; 15	CLT; 26	DOV; 33	POC; 30	MCH; 42	SON; 41	DAY; 12	CHI; 42	NHA; 34	POC; 15	IND; 14	GLN; 34	MCH; 18	BRI; 13	CAL; 23	RCH; 7	NHA; 33	DOV; 19	KAN; 13	TAL; 25	CLT; 40	MAR; 41	ATL; 24	TEX; 42	PHO; 24	HOM; 29	33rd	3049
2007	Ken Schrader	21	Ford	DAY; 35	CAL; 36		ATL; 37	BRI; 28	MAR; 19	TEX; 31	PHO; 28	TAL; DNQ	RCH; DNQ	DAR; 41																NHA; 30	DOV; 26	KAN; 32	TAL; 31							36th	2667
2007	Jon Wood	21	Ford			LVS; 29																																		36th	2667
2007	Bill Elliott	21	Ford												CLT; 38	DOV; 35	POC; 37	MCH; 11	SON; 19	NHA; 34	DAY; 24	CHI; 28	IND; 23	POC; 18	GLN; QL^{†}	MCH; 35	BRI; 25	CAL; 26	RCH; 29					CLT; 35	MAR; 34	ATL; 18	TEX; 36	PHO; 34	HOM; 28	36th	2667
2007	Boris Said	21	Ford																						GLN; 14															36th	2667
2008	Bill Elliott	21	Ford	DAY; DNQ	CAL; 26		ATL; DNQ		MAR; 34	TEX; 34	PHO; 31			DAR; 30		DOV; 33	POC; 31	MCH; 36				CHI; 35	IND; DNQ	POC; 20			BRI; 26		RCH; 35	NHA; 29		KAN; 25		CLT; 28	MAR; 16	ATL; 38	TEX; 31	PHO; 29	HOM; 12	40th	2296
2008	Johnny Sauter	21	Ford			LVS; DNQ																																		40th	2296
2008	Jeff Green	21	Ford					BRI; DNQ																																40th	2296
2008	Jon Wood	21	Ford									TAL; 36	RCH; DNQ		CLT; DNQ						DAY; 33												TAL; 33							40th	2296
2008	Marcos Ambrose	21	Ford																SON; 42	NHA; DNQ					GLN; 3	MCH; 43		CAL; 32			DOV; 32									40th	2296
2009	Bill Elliott	21	Ford	DAY; 23	CAL	LVS	ATL; 36	BRI	MAR	TEX; 28	PHO	TAL	RCH	DAR	CLT; 15	DOV	POC	MCH; 16	SON	NHA	DAY	CHI; 29	IND; 26	POC	GLN	MCH; 16	BRI					KAN; 19	CAL	CLT; 29	MAR	TAL	TEX; 34	PHO	HOM; 16	44th	1201
2009	David Gilliland	21	Ford																									ATL; 19	RCH	NHA	DOV									44th	1201
2010	Bill Elliott	21	Ford	DAY; 27	CAL	LVS	ATL; 16	BRI	MAR	PHO	TEX; 25	TAL	RCH	DAR	DOV	CLT; 27	POC	MCH; 29	SON	NHA	DAY	CHI; 37	IND; 18	POC	GLN	MCH; 22	BRI	ATL; 23	RCH	NHA	DOV	KAN; 25	CAL	CLT; 35	MAR	TAL			HOM; 15	45th	1176
2010	Trevor Bayne	21	Ford																																		TEX; 17	PHO		45th	1176
2011	Trevor Bayne	21	Ford	DAY; 1	PHO; 40	LVS; 20	BRI; 34	CAL; 30	MAR; 35	TEX; 17	TAL; 40	RCH	DAR	DOV				MCH; 16	SON	DAY; 41	KEN	NHA	IND; 30	POC	GLN	MCH; 24	BRI	ATL	RCH	CHI; 23	NHA	DOV	KAN	CLT; 31	TAL; 15	MAR	TEX; 17	PHO	HOM; 25	37th	347
2011	Ricky Stenhouse Jr.	21	Ford												CLT; 11	KAN	POC																							37th	347
2012	Trevor Bayne	21	Ford	DAY; 35	PHO	LVS; 9	BRI	CAL	MAR	TEX; 28	KAN	RCH	TAL; 8	DAR	CLT; 24	DOV	POC	MCH; 43	SON	KEN	DAY; 27	NHA	IND; 17	POC	GLN	MCH; 24	BRI	ATL; 16	RCH	CHI; 20	NHA	DOV	TAL; 21	CLT; 22	KAN; 21	MAR	TEX; 22	PHO	HOM; 23	36th	346
2013	Trevor Bayne	21	Ford	DAY; 27	PHO	LVS; 23	BRI	CAL	MAR	TEX; 18	KAN	RCH	TAL; 43	DAR	CLT; 16	DOV	POC	MCH; 15	SON	KEN	DAY; 20	NHA	IND; 28	POC	GLN	MCH; 21	BRI	ATL	RCH	CHI	NHA	DOV	KAN	CLT	TAL; 23	MAR	TEX; 29	PHO	HOM; 40	41st	226
2014	Trevor Bayne	21	Ford	DAY; 33	PHO	LVS; 20	BRI	CAL	MAR	TEX; 19	DAR	RCH	TAL; 41	KAN	CLT; 20	DOV	POC	MCH; 19	SON	KEN	DAY; 38	NHA	IND; 43	POC	GLN	MCH; 41	BRI	ATL	RCH	CHI	NHA	DOV	KAN	CLT	TAL; 32	MAR	TEX; 39	PHO	HOM; 42	43rd	143
2015	Ryan Blaney	21	Ford	DAY; 39	ATL	LVS; 19	PHO	CAL	MAR	TEX; 42	BRI	RCH	TAL; 4	KAN	CLT; 42	DOV	POC	MCH; 24	SON	DAY; DNQ	KEN; DNQ	NHA; 23	IND; 12	POC	GLN	MCH; 24	BRI; 22	DAR; 30	RCH	CHI; DNQ	NHA	DOV	CLT; 14	KAN; 7	TAL; 43	MAR	TEX; 43	PHO	HOM; 17	41st	300
2016	Ryan Blaney	21	Ford	DAY; 19	ATL; 25	LVS; 6	PHO; 10	CAL; 35	MAR; 19	TEX; 29	BRI; 11	RCH; 28	TAL; 9	KAN; 5	DOV; 8	CLT; 20	POC; 10	MCH; 17	SON; 23	DAY; 14	KEN; 35	NHA; 11	IND; 36	POC; 11	GLN; 19	BRI; 35	MCH; 4	DAR; 13	RCH; 39	CHI; 4	NHA; 12	DOV; 38	CLT; 31	KAN; 14	TAL; 11	MAR; 19	TEX; 12	PHO; 8	HOM; 26	21st	812
2017	Ryan Blaney	21	Ford	DAY; 2	ATL; 18	LVS; 7	PHO; 23	CAL; 9	MAR; 25	TEX; 12*	BRI; 33	RCH; 36	TAL; 39	**KAN**; 4	CLT; 24	DOV; 32	POC; 1	MCH; 25	SON; 9	DAY; 26	KEN; 10	NHA; 19	IND; 23	POC; 30	GLN; 8	MCH; 15	BRI; 10	DAR; 31	RCH; 18	CHI; 11	NHA; 9	DOV; 23	CLT; 8	TAL; 18	KAN; 3	MAR; 8	TEX; 6	**PHO**; 17	HOM; 29	9th	2305
2018	Paul Menard	21	Ford	DAY; 6	ATL; 17	LVS; 9	PHO; 36	CAL; 19	MAR; 13	TEX; 30	BRI; 13	RCH; 24	TAL; 30	DOV; 34	KAN; 6	CLT; 14	POC; 11	MCH; 5	SON; 26	**CHI**; 13	DAY; 28	KEN; 11	NHA; 17	POC; 21	GLN; 28	MCH; 16	BRI; 36	DAR; 17	IND; 9	LVS; 10	RCH; 22	CLT; 33	DOV; 16	TAL; 9	KAN; 32	MAR; 22	TEX; 13	PHO; 29	HOM; 25	19th	692
2019	Paul Menard	21	Ford	DAY; 29	ATL; 14	LVS; 15	PHO; 17	CAL; 20	MAR; 15	TEX; 19	BRI; 6	RCH; 10	TAL; 16	DOV; 17	KAN; 24	CLT; 14	POC; 18	MCH; 13	SON; 22	CHI; 21	DAY; 16	KEN; 11	NHA; 13	POC; 18	GLN; 18	MCH; 15	BRI; 23	DAR; 9	IND; 10	LVS; 14	RCH; 27	CLT; 16	DOV; 12	TAL; 16	KAN; 18	MAR; 21	TEX; 20	PHO; 12	HOM; 17	19th	777
2020	Matt DiBenedetto	21	Ford	DAY; 19	LVS; 2	CAL; 13	PHO; 13	DAR; 14	DAR; 9	CLT; 17	CLT; 15	BRI; 31	ATL; 25	MAR; 7	HOM; 14	TAL; 26	POC; 13	POC; 6	IND; 19	KEN; 3	TEX; 17	KAN; 36	NHA; 6	MCH; 15	MCH; 7	DAY; 15	DOV; 20	DOV; 17	DAY; 12	DAR; 21	RCH; 17	BRI; 19	LVS; 2	TAL; 21	CLT; 22	KAN; 12	TEX; 8	MAR; 10	PHO; 8	13th	2249
2021	Matt DiBenedetto	21	Ford	DAY; 33	DAY; 37	HOM; 28	LVS; 16	PHO; 14	ATL; 11	BRI; 13	MAR; 12	RCH; 9	TAL; 5	KAN; 4	DAR; 19	DOV; 24	COA; 23	CLT; 18	SON; 23	NSH; 24	POC; 32	POC; 18	ROA; 10	ATL; 9	NHA; 11	GLN; 11	IND; 5	MCH; 6	DAY; 25	DAR; 23	RCH; 18	BRI; 10	LVS; 12	TAL; 35	CLT; 6	TEX; 13	KAN; 23	MAR; 15	PHO; 12	18th	775
2022	Harrison Burton	21	Ford	DAY; 39	CAL; 34	LVS; 16	PHO; 29	ATL; 25	COA; 17	RCH; 18	MAR; 26	BRI; 20	TAL; 34	DOV; 24	DAR; 14	KAN; 21	CLT; 11	GTW; 25	SON; 28	NSH; 25	ROA; 22	ATL; 10	NHA; 26	POC; 23	IND; 3	MCH; 32	RCH; 25	GLN; 28	DAY; 19	DAR; 21	KAN; 32	BRI; 16	TEX; 18	TAL; 36	ROV; 28	LVS; 26	HOM; 19	MAR; 11	PHO; 19	29th	573
2023	Harrison Burton	21	Ford	DAY; 26	CAL; 15	LVS; 26	PHO; 35	ATL; 34	COA; 22	RCH; 19	BRD; 15	MAR; 29	TAL; 36	DOV; 20	KAN; 30	DAR; 6	CLT; 18	GTW; 23	SON; 27	NSH; 21	CSC; 30	ATL; 28	NHA; 20	POC; 8	RCH; 31	MCH; 17	IRC; 21	GLN; 33	DAY; 28	DAR; 35	KAN; 35	BRI; 28	TEX; 20	TAL; 31	ROV; 24	LVS; 19	HOM; 36	MAR; 15	PHO; 26	31st	452
2024	Harrison Burton	21	Ford	DAY; 39	ATL; 11	LVS; 30	PHO; 27	BRI; 32	COA; 30	RCH; 34	MAR; 33	TEX; 28	TAL; 10	DOV; 26	KAN; 36	DAR; 22	CLT; 32	GTW; 31	SON; 25	IOW; 20	NHA; 14	NSH; 28	CSC; 25	POC; 31	IND; 36	RCH; 32	MCH; 14	DAY; 1	DAR; 21	ATL; 31	GLN; 24	BRI; 35	KAN; 23	TAL; 34	ROV; 20	LVS; 15	HOM; 24	MAR; 36	PHO; 16	16th	2122
2025	Josh Berry	21	Ford	DAY; 37	ATL; 25	COA; 26	PHO; 4	LVS; 1	HOM; 17	MAR; 32	DAR; 36	BRI; 12	TAL; 26	TEX; 32	KAN; 6	CLT; 12	NSH; 30	MCH; 12	MXC; 26	POC; 12	ATL; 32	CSC; 34	SON; 13	DOV; 28	IND; 22	IOW; 13	GLN; 35	RCH; 8	DAY; 9	DAR; 38	GTW; 36	BRI; 39	NHA; 2	KAN; 33	ROV; 16	LVS; 26	TAL; 33	MAR; 10	PHO; 7	16th	2150
2026	Josh Berry	21	Ford	DAY; 9	ATL; 38	COA; 26	PHO; 32	LVS; 31	DAR; 17	MAR; 10	BRI; 32	KAN; 27	TAL; 33	TEX; 29	GLN; 32	CLT; 29	NSH; 31	MCH; 15	POC; 33	COR; 29	SON; 28	CHI; 33	ATL; 25	NWS; 36	IND; 7	IOW; 4	RCH; 8	NHA; 3	DAY; 9	DAR; 7	GTW; 28	BRI; 6	KAN; 35	LVS; 26	CLT; 4	PHO; 11	TAL; 12	MAR; 4	HOM; 13	21st	676

=== NASCAR Craftsman Truck Series ===
==== Truck No. 19 results ====
Year	Driver	No.	Make	1	2	3	4	5	6	7	8	9	10	11	12	13	14	15	16	17	18	19	20	21	22	23	24	25	Owners	Pts
2006	Kelly Bires	19	Ford	DAY	CAL	ATL	MAR	GTY	CLT	MFD	DOV	TEX	MCH	MLW	KAN	KEN	MEM	IRP	NSH	BRI	NHA	LVS	TAL	MAR	ATL; 19	TEX	PHO	HOM		

==== Truck No. 20/09 results ====
Year	Driver	No.	Make	1	2	3	4	5	6	7	8	9	10	11	12	13	14	15	16	17	18	19	20	21	22	23	24	25	Owners	Pts
2006	Jon Wood	20	Ford	DAY; 16	CAL; 9																									
2006	Bobby East	20	Ford			ATL; 23																								
2006	Marcos Ambrose	20	Ford				MAR; 33	GTY; 34	CLT; 36	MFD; 23	DOV; 26	TEX; 27	MCH; 26	MLW; 18	KAN; 3	**KEN**; 19	MEM; 34	IRP; 22	NSH; 3	BRI; 26	NHA; 23	LVS; 7	TAL; 17	MAR; 25	ATL; 16	TEX; 10	PHO; 15	HOM; 27		
2007	Joey Clanton	09	Ford	DAY; 6		ATL; 9	MAR; 31		CLT; 31	MFD; 11		TEX; 17			MEM; 30	KEN; 7		NSH; 10	BRI; 23	GTW; 34			TAL; 19	MAR; 28	ATL; 6	TEX; 32		HOM; 26		
2007	Stacy Compton	09	Ford		CAL; 12			KAN; 14			DOV; 2		MCH; 12	MLW; 12			IRP; 22				NHA; 22	LVS; 8					PHO; 32			
2008	Scott Lagasse Jr.	20	Ford	DAY; 26	CAL; 19	ATL; 29	MAR; 23	KAN; 30	CLT; 27	MFD; 33	DOV; 26	TEX	MCH	MLW	MEM	KEN	IRP	NSH	BRI	GTW	NHA	LVS	TAL	MAR	ATL	TEX	PHO	HOM		

==== Truck No. 21 results ====
Year	Driver	No.	Make	1	2	3	4	5	6	7	8	9	10	11	12	13	14	15	16	17	18	19	20	21	22	23	24	25	Owners	Pts
2005	Bobby East	21	Ford	DAY	CAL	ATL	MAR	GTY	MFD	CLT	DOV	TEX	MCH	MLW	KAN	KEN	MEM	IRP	NSH	BRI	RCH	NHA	LVS	MAR	ATL	TEX	PHO	HOM; DNQ		
2006	Stacy Compton	21	Ford	DAY; 25	CAL; 26																									
2006	Jon Wood	21	Ford			ATL; 6																								
2006	Bobby East	21	Ford				MAR; 13	GTY; 13	CLT; 24	MFD; 34	DOV; 17	TEX; 28	MCH; 30	MLW; 17	KAN; 24	KEN; 34	MEM; 21	IRP; 11	NSH; 36	BRI; 29	NHA; 30	LVS; 22	TAL; 23	MAR; 21	ATL; 15	TEX; 22	PHO; 18	HOM; 16		
2007	Kelly Bires	21	Ford	DAY; 26		ATL; 10	MAR; 34	KAN; 31		MFD; 25				MLW; 35																
2007	Mark Martin	21	Ford		CAL; 23				CLT; 4		DOV; 6		MCH; 33						BRI; 3						ATL; 4					
2007	Stacy Compton	21	Ford									TEX; 10																		
2007	Keven Wood	21	Ford												MEM; 27															
2007	Jon Wood	21	Ford													KEN; 6	IRP; 28	NSH; 7		GTW; 14	NHA; 9	LVS; 3*	TAL; 10	MAR; 16		TEX; 8	PHO; 20	**HOM**; 13		
2008	Jon Wood	21	Ford	DAY; 27	CAL; 32	ATL; 10	MAR; 28	KAN; 26	CLT; 19		DOV; 15	TEX; 10	MCH; 14			KEN; 11			BRI; 16			LVS; 13	TAL; 22	MAR; 30	ATL; 21	TEX; 31	PHO; 23			
2008	Keven Wood	21	Ford							MFD; 22				MLW; 21	MEM; 30		IRP; 24	NSH; 29		GTW; 15	NHA; 22							HOM; 29		

Footnotes
