= Leonard Wood (racing) =

Crew chief/Engine builder

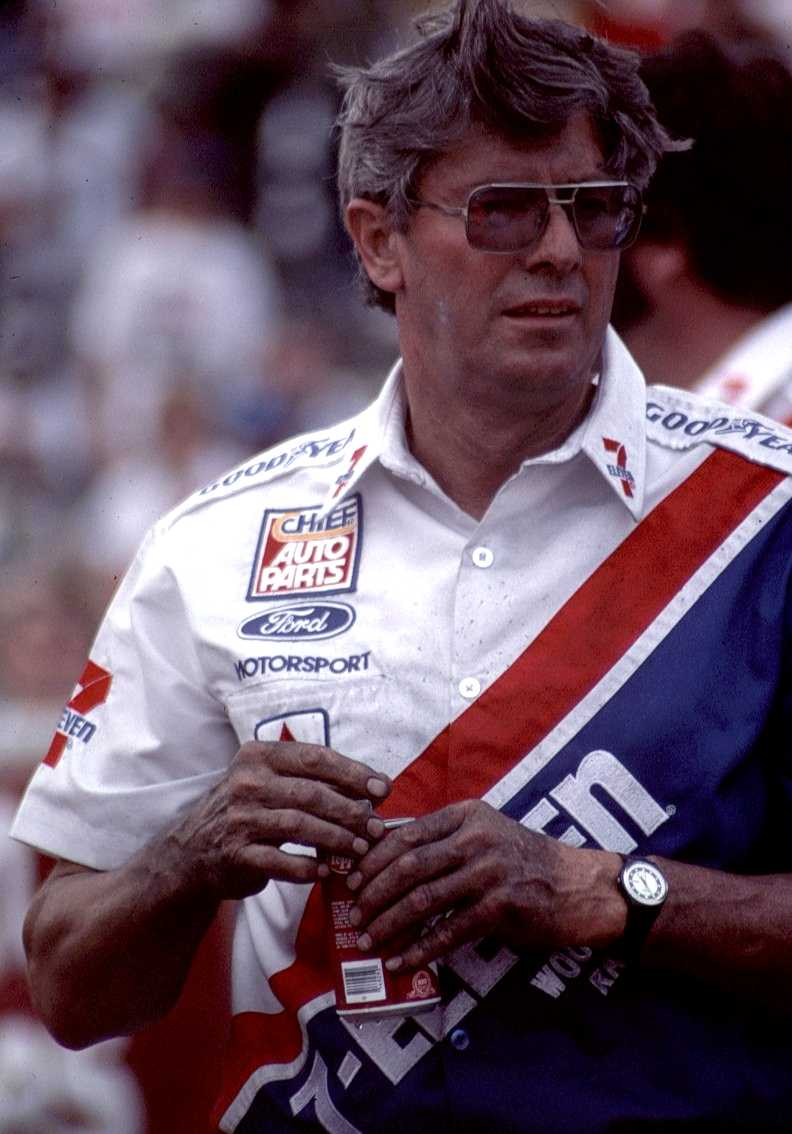
- Born: Leonard Earle Wood; September 22, 1934 (age 91); Stuart, Virginia, U.S.
- Occupations: Crew chief, engine builder
- Organization: Wood Brothers Racing

Leonard Earle Wood (born September 22, 1934) is an American former NASCAR crew chief, engine builder and co-founder of Wood Brothers Racing. Considered the innovator of the modern pit stop, Wood's team is recognized as the first to record a 25-second four-tire pit stop in NASCAR history. During his tenure as crew chief, the Wood team won 96 races with 117 poles clinched.

== Early life ==
Wood was born on September 22, 1934, on a family farm near Stuart, Virginia as one of six children (five sons and one daughter), and began building vehicles when he built a wagon with logs for wheels, which is intended to roll downhill. When he was 13, Wood placed a washing machine engine on a go-kart frame and used various pulleys and chains from salvaged vehicles at his father's shop to propel the vehicle, which was able to reach a top speed of 25 miles per hour (40 km/h). The go-kart is currently on display in Stuart's Wood Brothers Museum. In high school, Wood learned to build an engine from watching his father, Walter, disassemble the engine from the team's car and successfully rebuild it.

== NASCAR ==
In 1950, Wood and two of his brothers, Glen and Delano, purchased a 1940 Ford, which was later modified and used in NASCAR, and the team made its first start in a Lincoln at Martinsville Speedway on May 17, 1953. Wood was the team's engine builder, and the team's pit crew, originally composed of family and friends, became the first team in NASCAR history to record a 25-second four-tire pit stop. Wood stated that in 1960 at Charlotte Motor Speedway, he noticed that Fireball Roberts', had the lead at the time, pit crew took 45 seconds to change two tires and fuel; Roberts' team was using a four-prong lug wrench, so Wood's team decided to use power wrenches, which cut down the time to 25 seconds. Wood later modernized the floor jack; originally, jacks weighed between 70 and 80 pounds, and required at least ten pumps for tire clearance. Wood disassembled the jacks and installed larger pistons, leading to only two to three pumps to clear. In 1965, Wood's team was hired by Jim Clark to pit for him in the 1965 Indianapolis 500, which went on to win. The team used a modified fuel can to make the gas flow faster.

In 2006, Wood was inducted into the Virginia Sports Hall of Fame. On May 23, 2012, Wood was named as one of the members of the 2013 NASCAR Hall of Fame inductees, and was inducted on February 8, 2013. Wood earned 57 percent of the votes, tied with Herb Thomas. At the 2012 Brickyard 400, Wood Brothers Racing honored Wood with a special paint scheme with candy apple red instead of metal-flake red, which the team switched to in 1971, and Wood's head shot on the hood.

== Awards ==
Wood was inducted into the Motorsports Hall of Fame of America in 2000, along with his brother Glen.
