= Keven Wood =

American racing driver

- Born: August 21, 1984 (age 42); Stuart, Virginia, U.S.

NASCAR FedEx Freight Truck Series career
- 9 races run over 2 years
- 2008 position: 37th
- Best finish: 37th (2008)
- First race: 2007 O'Reilly 200 (Memphis)
- Last race: 2008 Ford 200 (Homestead)
Wins	Top tens	Poles
0	0	0

Keven Wood (born August 21, 1984) is an American former professional stock car racing driver who is the grandson of Glen Wood, and currently serves as an Executive Vice President and Co-Owner of Wood Brothers Racing. The son of Len Wood (Glen's son), he is the cousin of Jon Wood (Eddie's brother). Glen Wood was a NASCAR Hall of Famer who founded Wood Brothers Racing.

== Early life ==
Wood attended Patrick & Henry Community College in Henry County, Virginia.

== Motorsports career results ==
=== NASCAR ===
(key) (Bold – Pole position awarded by qualifying time. Italics – Pole position earned by points standings or practice time. * – Most laps led.)

==== Craftsman Truck Series ====
NASCAR Craftsman Truck Series results
Year	Team	No.	Make	1	2	3	4	5	6	7	8	9	10	11	12	13	14	15	16	17	18	19	20	21	22	23	24	25	NCTC	Pts	Ref
2007	Wood Brothers Racing	21	Ford	DAY	CAL	ATL	MAR	KAN	CLT	MFD	DOV	TEX	MCH	MLW	MEM; 27	KEN	IRP	NSH	BRI	GTW	NHA	LVS	TAL	MAR	ATL	TEX	PHO	HOM	95th	82	
2008	Wood Brothers Racing	21	Ford	DAY	CAL	ATL	MAR	KAN	CLT	MFD; 22	DOV	TEX	MCH	MLW; 21	MEM; 30	KEN	IRP; 24	NSH; 29	BRI	GTW; 15	NHA; 22	LVS	TAL	MAR	ATL	TEX	PHO	HOM; 29	37th	728	
