= Ryan Lawler =

American racing driver

- Born: April 9, 1987 (age 39); Colleyville, Texas, U.S.

NASCAR FedEx Freight Truck Series career
- 8 races run over 1 year
- Best finish: 35th (2008)
- First race: 2008 Kroger 250 (Martinsville)
- Last race: 2008 Chevy Silverado 350K (Texas)
| Wins | Top tens | Poles |
|---|---|---|
| 0 | 0 | 0 |

Ryan Lawler (born April 9, 1987) is an American former stock car racing driver. Lawler competed in eight races in the 2008 NASCAR Craftsman Truck Series. His best finish was 17th, which he achieved at Martinsville and Kentucky. Lawler finished 35th in the point standings.

== Motorsports career results ==
=== NASCAR ===
(key) (Bold – Pole position awarded by qualifying time. Italics – Pole position earned by points standings or practice time. * – Most laps led.)

==== Craftsman Truck Series ====
NASCAR Craftsman Truck Series results
| Year | Team | No. | Make | 1 | 2 | 3 | 4 | 5 | 6 | 7 | 8 | 9 | 10 | 11 | 12 | 13 | 14 | 15 | 16 | 17 | 18 | 19 | 20 | 21 | 22 | 23 | 24 | 25 | NCTC | Pts | Ref |
|---|---|---|---|---|---|---|---|---|---|---|---|---|---|---|---|---|---|---|---|---|---|---|---|---|---|---|---|---|---|---|---|
| 2008 | SS-Green Light Racing | 07 | Chevy | DAY | CAL | ATL | MAR; 17 | KAN; 32 | CLT | MFD | DOV; 28 | TEX; 18 | MCH | MLW | MEM; 21 | KEN; 17 | IRP | NSH | BRI | GTW | NHA | LVS | TAL | | | | | | 35th | 763 | |
| 2008 | SS-Green Light Racing | 08 | Dodge | | | | | | | | | | | | | | | | | | | | | MAR; 27 | ATL | | | | 35th | 763 | |
| 2008 | Billy Ballew Motorsports | 15 | Toyota | | | | | | | | | | | | | | | | | | | | | | | TEX; 22 | PHO | HOM | 35th | 763 | |

=== ARCA Re/Max Series ===
(key) (Bold – Pole position awarded by qualifying time. Italics – Pole position earned by points standings or practice time. * – Most laps led.)

ARCA Re/Max Series results
| Year | Team | No. | Make | 1 | 2 | 3 | 4 | 5 | 6 | 7 | 8 | 9 | 10 | 11 | 12 | 13 | 14 | 15 | 16 | 17 | 18 | 19 | 20 | 21 | 22 | 23 | ARMC | Pts | Ref |
|---|---|---|---|---|---|---|---|---|---|---|---|---|---|---|---|---|---|---|---|---|---|---|---|---|---|---|---|---|---|
| 2007 | Norm Benning Racing | 8 | Dodge | DAY | USA | NSH | SLM | KAN | WIN | KEN | TOL | IOW | POC | MCH | BLN | KEN; 16 | POC | NSH | ISF | MIL | GTW | DSF | CHI | SLM | TAL | TOL | 131st | 50 | |
