= Jon Wood =

NASCAR driver

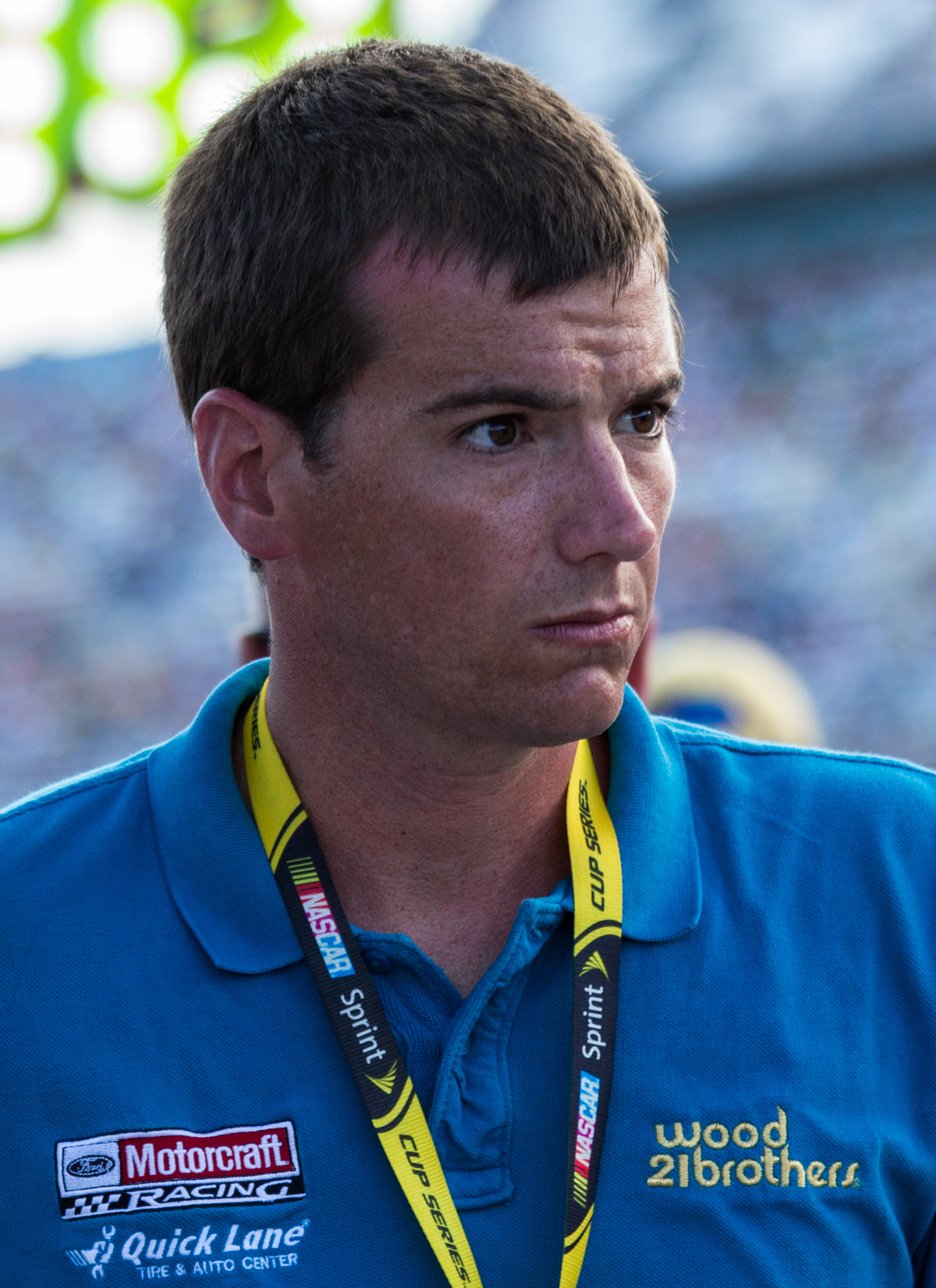
- Wood at Daytona International Speedway in 2013
- Born: October 25, 1981 (age 45); Stuart, Virginia, U.S.

NASCAR Cup Series career
- 4 races run over 2 years
- 2008 position: 60th
- Best finish: 60th (2008)
- First race: 2007 UAW-DaimlerChrysler 400 (Las Vegas)
- Last race: 2008 AMP Energy 500 (Talladega)
| Wins | Top tens | Poles |
|---|---|---|
| 0 | 0 | 0 |

NASCAR O'Reilly Auto Parts Series career
- 85 races run over 5 years
- 2007 position: 45th
- Best finish: 14th (2006)
- First race: 2002 Kroger 200 (IRP)
- Last race: 2007 Carquest Auto Parts 300 (Charlotte)
| Wins | Top tens | Poles |
|---|---|---|
| 0 | 12 | 0 |

NASCAR FedEx Freight Truck Series career
- 119 races run over 7 years
- 2008 position: 25th
- Best finish: 5th (2003)
- First race: 2001 Advance Auto Parts 250 (Martinsville)
- Last race: 2008 Lucas Oil 150 (Phoenix)
- First win: 2003 O'Reilly Auto Parts 250 (Kansas)
- Last win: 2003 Advance Auto Parts 200 (Martinsville)
| Wins | Top tens | Poles |
|---|---|---|
| 2 | 51 | 3 |
- Statistics up to date as of September 26, 2009.

Jonathan Wood (born October 25, 1981) is an American motorsport executive who serves as president of Wood Brothers Racing, the NASCAR Cup Series' longest continuously active team founded by a group of brothers that included his grandfather Glen Wood.

== Early career ==
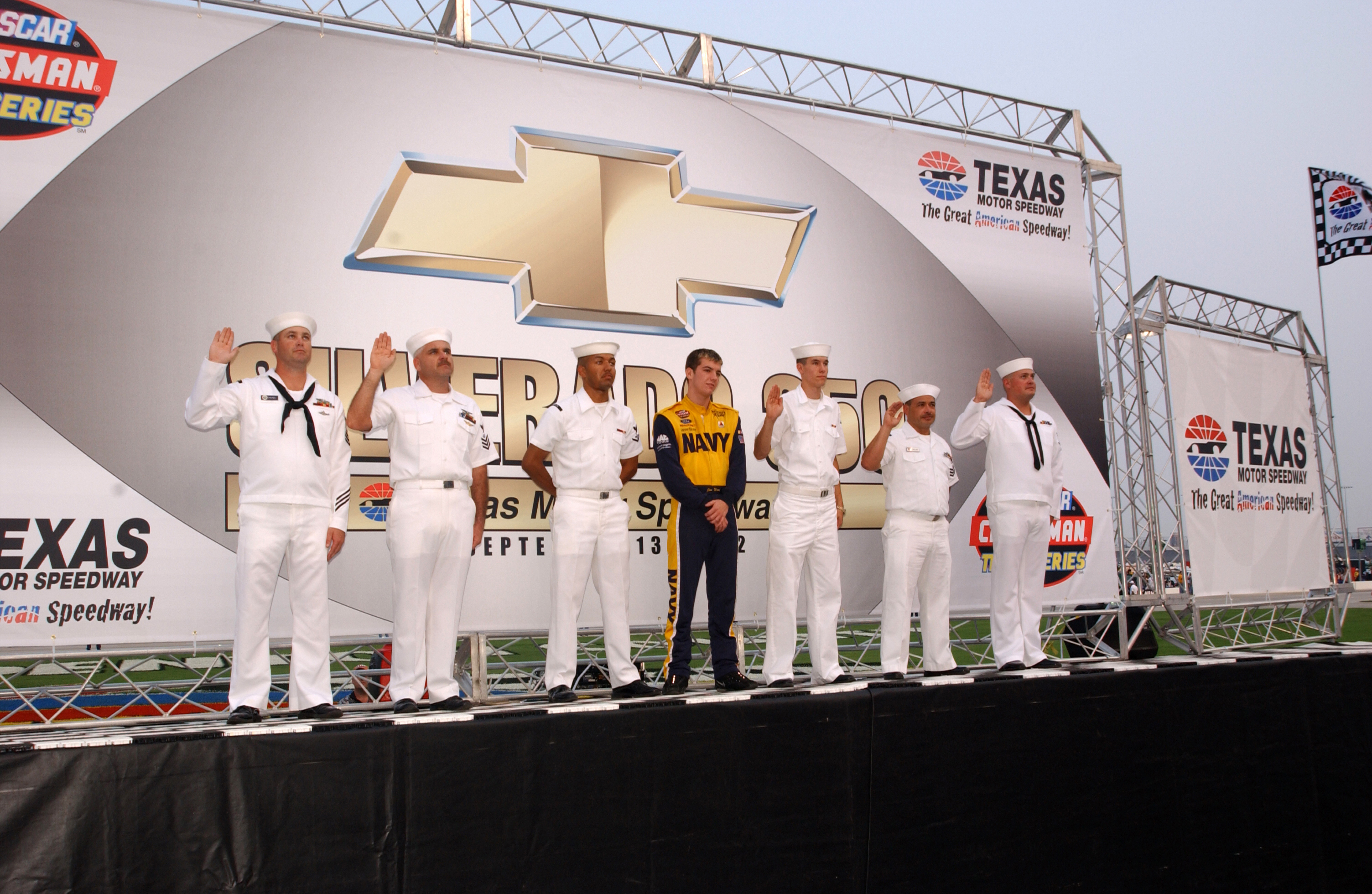
Wood joins sailors during a special pre-race reenlistment ceremony at Texas Motor Speedway Fort Worth, Texas, (September 13, 2002)

Wood was given his first go kart as a child by Dale Jarrett, the Wood Brothers' driver at the time. After racing go-karts, he moved up to stock cars, racing in the USAR Hooters Pro Cup Series and the NASCAR Winston West Series. Wood made his NASCAR debut in the 2001 Craftsman Truck Series at Martinsville Speedway, driving the No. 15 Ford F-150 for Billy Ballew Motorsports. He started and finished 31st after suffering rear end failures. The release of Chuck Hossfeld allowed Wood to drive Roush Racing's No. 50 Eldon Ford for the rest of the year. He claimed a pair of top-five finishes (Kansas and Fontana) in his limited appearances. In 2002, Wood ran the entire schedule, earning ten top-tens with sponsorship from the United States Navy. That year, he made his Busch Series debut at IRP, subbing for Jeff Burton in the No. 9 Gain Ford Taurus. He started and finished sixth that day.

In 2003, Wood notched two poles, ten top-fives and twenty top-ten finishes, including two wins on his way to a fifth place standing in the Craftsman Truck Series points. He ran most of the season with sponsored by Bob Graham. He ran his second Busch race that season at the Ford 300 in the No. 15 for ppc Racing. He finished 22nd. Unfortunately, the 2004 Craftsman Truck Series season was a struggle for Wood, who was forced to run unsponsored for virtually the entire season.

== 2005–2008 ==
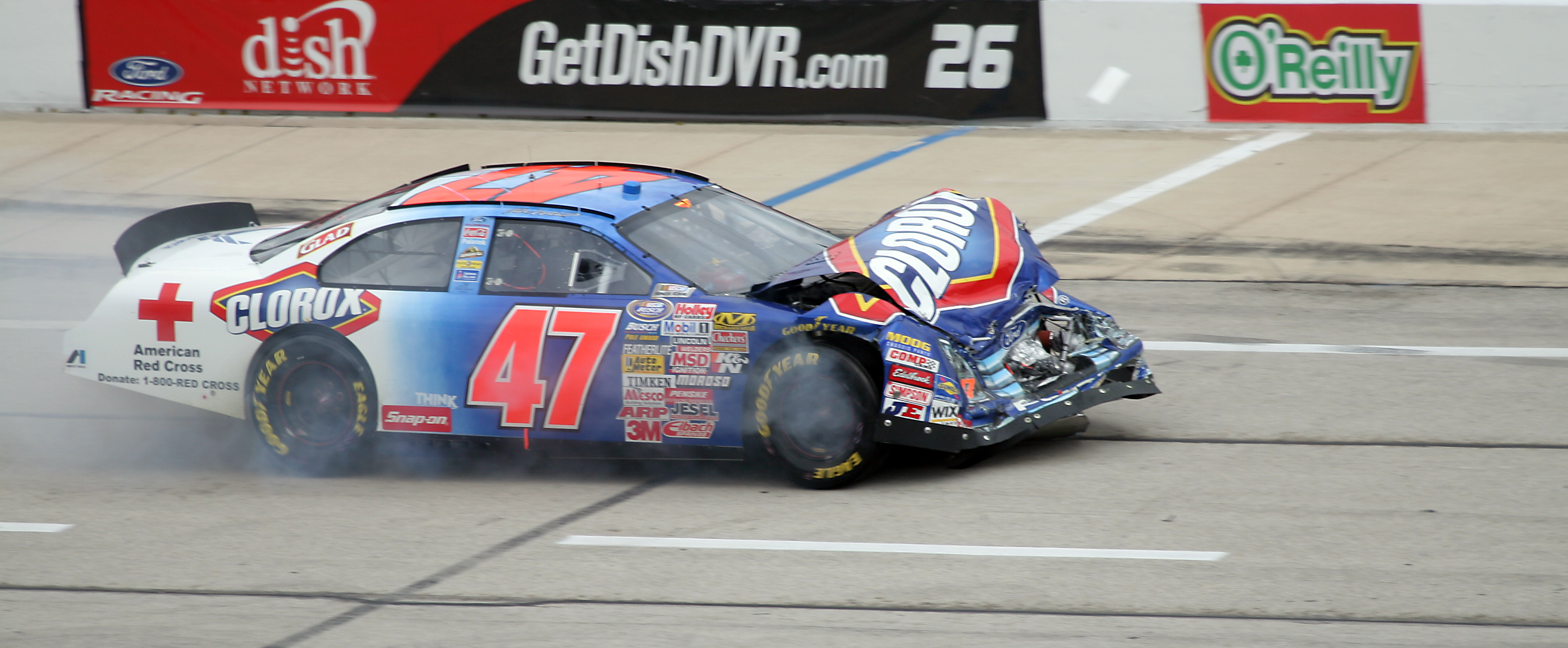
2007 Busch car after a wreck

Wood moved to NASCAR's Busch Series full-time in 2005, driving for ST Motorsports (which later merged with the Wood Brothers to form Wood Brothers/JTG in 2006.) Wood had two top-fives and finished fifteenth in points, finishing fourth in the Rookie of the Year standings. In August 2005, Wood was released from his development contract with Roush Racing and became a member of the Wood Brothers driver development program. Wood had one top-five finish in 2006 and moved up one spot in the standings.

Originally, plans called for Wood to move up to Nextel Cup full-time in 2007; however, because of sponsor issues and the need for more experience, Wood ran only a partial schedule during the 2007 Nextel Cup season. Wood was to continue to drive full-time in the No. 47 Clorox-sponsored Ford Fusion in the Busch Series but was pulled from the ride following medical issues. He spent the rest of the season back in the Truck Series in the No. 21 Ford and had six top-tens in eleven starts as well as a pole position. He shared the No. 21 truck in 2008 with his cousin Keven but only had two top-ten finishes. He also made three Sprint Cup starts that season but failed to finish higher than 33rd. At the end of the season, the truck team for which Woods was running closed down and he has not raced since late 2010.

After retiring from driving, Wood now serves as the President and Co-owner (formerly the Senior Vice President and the Director of Business Development) for Wood Brothers Racing. He actively participates in the day-to-day operations of the company's merchandising and business development.

== Motorsports career results ==
=== NASCAR ===
(key) (Bold – Pole position awarded by qualifying time. Italics – Pole position earned by points standings or practice time. * – Most laps led.)

==== Sprint Cup Series ====
NASCAR Sprint Cup Series results
| Year | Team | No. | Make | 1 | 2 | 3 | 4 | 5 | 6 | 7 | 8 | 9 | 10 | 11 | 12 | 13 | 14 | 15 | 16 | 17 | 18 | 19 | 20 | 21 | 22 | 23 | 24 | 25 | 26 | 27 | 28 | 29 | 30 | 31 | 32 | 33 | 34 | 35 | 36 | NSCC | Pts | Ref |
|---|---|---|---|---|---|---|---|---|---|---|---|---|---|---|---|---|---|---|---|---|---|---|---|---|---|---|---|---|---|---|---|---|---|---|---|---|---|---|---|---|---|---|
| 2005 | Wood Brothers Racing | 21 | Ford | DAY | CAL | LVS | ATL | BRI | MAR | TEX | PHO | TAL | DAR | RCH | CLT | DOV | POC | MCH | SON | DAY | CHI | NHA | POC | IND | GLN | MCH | BRI | CAL; QL^{†} | RCH | NHA | DOV | TAL | KAN | CLT | MAR | ATL | TEX | PHO | HOM | N/A | 0 | |
| 2007 | Wood Brothers Racing | 21 | Ford | DAY | CAL | LVS; 29 | ATL | BRI | MAR | TEX | PHO | TAL | RCH | DAR | CLT | DOV | POC | MCH | SON | NHA | DAY | CHI | IND | POC | GLN | MCH | BRI | CAL | RCH | NHA | DOV | | | | | | | | | 67th | 76 | |
| 2007 | Wood Brothers/JTG Racing | 47 | Ford | | | | | | | | | | | | | | | | | | | | | | | | | | | | | KAN; DNQ | TAL | CLT | MAR | ATL | TEX | PHO | HOM | 67th | 76 | |
| 2008 | Wood Brothers Racing | 21 | Ford | DAY | CAL | LVS | ATL | BRI | MAR | TEX | PHO | TAL; 36 | RCH; DNQ | DAR | CLT; DNQ | DOV | POC | MCH | SON | NHA | DAY; 33 | CHI | IND | POC | GLN | MCH | BRI | CAL | RCH | NHA | DOV | KAN | TAL; 33 | CLT | MAR | ATL | TEX | PHO | HOM | 60th | 183 | |
^{†} - Qualified for Ricky Rudd

==== Busch Series ====
NASCAR Busch Series results
| Year | Team | No. | Make | 1 | 2 | 3 | 4 | 5 | 6 | 7 | 8 | 9 | 10 | 11 | 12 | 13 | 14 | 15 | 16 | 17 | 18 | 19 | 20 | 21 | 22 | 23 | 24 | 25 | 26 | 27 | 28 | 29 | 30 | 31 | 32 | 33 | 34 | 35 | NBSC | Pts | Ref |
|---|---|---|---|---|---|---|---|---|---|---|---|---|---|---|---|---|---|---|---|---|---|---|---|---|---|---|---|---|---|---|---|---|---|---|---|---|---|---|---|---|---|
| 2002 | Roush Racing | 9 | Ford | DAY | CAR | LVS | DAR | BRI | TEX | NSH | TAL | CAL | RCH | NHA | NZH | CLT | DOV | NSH | KEN | MLW | DAY | CHI | GTY | PPR | IRP; 6 | MCH | BRI | DAR | RCH | DOV | KAN | CLT | MEM | ATL | CAR | PHO | HOM | | 88th | 150 | |
| 2003 | ppc Racing | 15 | Ford | DAY | CAR | LVS | DAR | BRI | TEX | TAL | NSH | CAL | RCH | GTY | NZH | CLT | DOV | NSH | KEN | MLW | DAY | CHI | NHA | PPR | IRP | MCH | BRI | DAR | RCH | DOV | KAN | CLT | MEM | ATL | PHO | CAR | HOM; 22 | | 123rd | 97 | |
| 2005 | JTG Racing | 47 | Ford | DAY; 31 | CAL; 28 | MXC; 16 | LVS; 17 | ATL; 25 | NSH; 12 | BRI; 11 | TEX; 8 | PHO; 18 | TAL; 2 | DAR; 35 | RCH; 35 | CLT; 33 | DOV; 40 | NSH; 32 | KEN; 10 | MLW; 26 | DAY; 29 | CHI; 37 | NHA; 37 | PPR; 22 | GTY; 21 | IRP; 34 | GLN; 20 | MCH; 19 | BRI; 37 | CAL; 14 | RCH; 17 | DOV; 16 | KAN; 5 | CLT; 7 | MEM; 40 | TEX; 26 | PHO; 33 | HOM; 6 | 15th | 3346 | |
| 2006 | JTG Racing | 47 | Ford | DAY; 4 | CAL; 18 | MXC; 27 | LVS; 14 | ATL; 13 | BRI; 17 | TEX; 26 | NSH; 6 | PHO; 23 | TAL; 19 | RCH; 38 | DAR; 33 | CLT; 37 | DOV; 40 | NSH; 8 | KEN; 22 | MLW; 14 | DAY; 34 | CHI; 21 | NHA; 20 | MAR; 21 | GTY; 15 | IRP; 14 | GLN; 29 | MCH; 36 | BRI; 28 | CAL; 8 | RCH; 25 | DOV; 38 | KAN; 15 | CLT; 23 | MEM; 29 | TEX; 12 | PHO; 38 | HOM; 18 | 14th | 3381 | |
| 2007 | JTG Racing | 47 | Ford | DAY; 15 | CAL; 31 | MXC; 10 | LVS; 11 | ATL; 36 | BRI; 43 | NSH; 16 | TEX; 38 | PHO; 25 | TAL; 31 | RCH; 21 | DAR; 32 | CLT; 13 | DOV | NSH | KEN | MLW | NHA | DAY | CHI | GTY | IRP | CGV | GLN | MCH | BRI | CAL | RCH | DOV | KAN | CLT | MEM | TEX | PHO | HOM | 45th | 1154 | |

==== Craftsman Truck Series ====
NASCAR Craftsman Truck Series results
| Year | Team | No. | Make | 1 | 2 | 3 | 4 | 5 | 6 | 7 | 8 | 9 | 10 | 11 | 12 | 13 | 14 | 15 | 16 | 17 | 18 | 19 | 20 | 21 | 22 | 23 | 24 | 25 | NCTC | Pts | Ref |
|---|---|---|---|---|---|---|---|---|---|---|---|---|---|---|---|---|---|---|---|---|---|---|---|---|---|---|---|---|---|---|---|
| 2001 | Billy Ballew Motorsports | 15 | Ford | DAY | HOM | MMR | MAR; 31 | GTY | DAR | PPR | DOV | TEX | | | | | | | | | | | | | | | | | 17th | 1917 | |
| 2001 | Roush Racing | 50 | Ford | | | | | | | | | | MEM; 14 | MLW; 12 | KAN; 4 | KEN; 7 | NHA; 19 | IRP; 27 | NSH; 16 | CIC; 12 | NZH; 6 | RCH; 13 | SBO; 14 | TEX; 24 | LVS; 29 | PHO; 14 | CAL; 3 | | 17th | 1917 | |
| 2002 | Roush Racing | 50 | Ford | DAY; 21 | DAR; 9 | MAR; 10 | GTY; 7 | PPR; 12 | DOV; 29 | TEX; 9 | MEM; 11 | MLW; 9 | KAN; 9 | KEN; 13 | NHA; 11 | MCH; 10 | IRP; 8 | NSH; 8 | RCH; 28 | TEX; 12 | SBO; 6 | LVS; 18 | CAL; 13 | PHO; 11 | HOM; 14 | | | | 12th | 2782 | |
| 2003 | Roush Racing | 50 | Ford | DAY; 8 | DAR; 19 | MMR; 2 | MAR; 22 | CLT; 22 | DOV; 4 | TEX; 3 | **MEM**; 4 | MLW; 10 | KAN; 1* | **KEN**; 4 | GTW; 11 | MCH; 6 | IRP; 5 | NSH; 7 | BRI; 8 | RCH; 4 | NHA; 9 | CAL; 9 | LVS; 19 | SBO; 4 | TEX; 6 | MAR; 1 | PHO; 7 | HOM; 8 | 5th | 3659 | |
| 2004 | Roush Racing | 50 | Ford | DAY; 7 | ATL; 27 | MAR; 4 | MFD; 8 | CLT; 17 | DOV; 10 | TEX; 13 | MEM; 8 | MLW; 11 | KAN; 6 | KEN; 12 | GTW; 30 | MCH; 30 | IRP; 27 | NSH; 18 | BRI; 18 | RCH; 14 | NHA; 29 | LVS; 12 | CAL; 13 | TEX; 26 | MAR; 4 | PHO; 26 | DAR; 22 | HOM; 36 | 15th | 2835 | |
| 2006 | Wood Brothers/JTG Racing | 20 | Ford | DAY; 16 | CAL; 9 | | | | | | | | | | | | | | | | | | | | | | | | 44th | 408 | |
| 2006 | Wood Brothers/JTG Racing | 21 | Ford | | | ATL; 6 | MAR | GTY | CLT | MFD | DOV | TEX | MCH | MLW | KAN | KEN | MEM | IRP | NSH | BRI | NHA | LVS | TAL | MAR | ATL | TEX | PHO | HOM | 44th | 408 | |
| 2007 | Wood Brothers Racing | 21 | Ford | DAY | CAL | ATL | MAR | KAN | CLT | MFD | DOV | TEX | MCH | MLW | MEM | KEN; 6 | IRP; 28 | NSH; 7 | BRI | GTW; 14 | NHA; 9 | LVS; 3* | TAL; 10 | MAR; 16 | ATL | TEX; 8 | PHO; 20 | **HOM**; 13 | 27th | 1432 | |
| 2008 | Wood Brothers Racing | 21 | Ford | DAY; 27 | CAL; 32 | ATL; 10 | MAR; 28 | KAN; 26 | CLT; 19 | MFD | DOV; 15 | TEX; 10 | MCH; 14 | MLW | MEM | KEN; 11 | IRP | NSH | BRI; 16 | GTW | NHA | LVS; 13 | TAL; 22 | MAR; 30 | ATL; 21 | TEX; 31 | PHO; 23 | HOM | 25th | 1729 | |

==== Winston West Series ====
NASCAR Winston West Series results
| Year | Team | No. | Make | 1 | 2 | 3 | 4 | 5 | 6 | 7 | 8 | 9 | 10 | 11 | 12 | 13 | 14 | NWWSC | Pts | Ref |
|---|---|---|---|---|---|---|---|---|---|---|---|---|---|---|---|---|---|---|---|---|
| 2001 | Wood Brothers Racing | 50 | Ford | PHO; 11 | LVS | TUS | MMR | CAL; 2* | IRW | LAG | **KAN**; 4 | EVG | CNS | IRW | RMR | **LVS**; 1 | IRW | 23rd | 628 | |
