= Scotty Crockett =

American NASCAR driver (born 1979)

- Born: August 20, 1979 (age 46)
- Occupation: Stock Car Racing Driver

Scotty Crockett (born August 20, 1979) is an American former stock car racing driver. Crockett competed in two NASCAR Craftsman Truck Series races during the 2008 season for DGM Racing.
