= Shelby Howard =

American racing driver (born 1985)

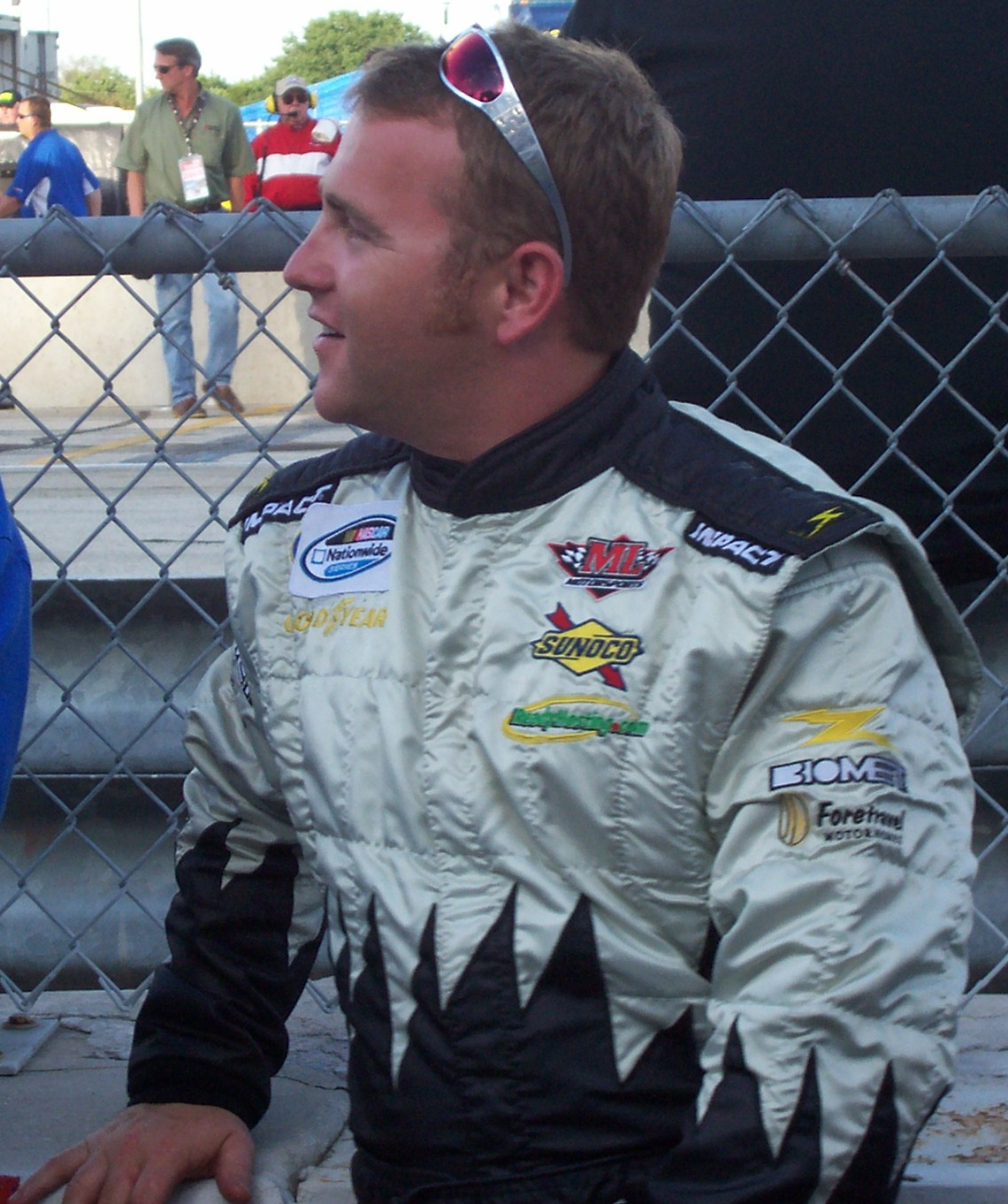
- Howard at the Milwaukee Mile in 2009
- Born: Shelby Dean Howard, IV; July 25, 1985 (age 41); Greenwood, Indiana, U.S.
- Achievements: 1997 Mini Cup Points Champion; 1998 600cc Miami County Speedway Champion
- Awards: 1997 Miami County Speedway 250cc Adult Class Rookie of the Year; 1999 Jasper Modified Series Rookie of the Year; 1999 Anderson Speedway Rookie of the Year; 2002 ARCA RE/MAX Series Rookie of the Year

NASCAR O'Reilly Auto Parts Series career
- 54 races run over 8 years
- Best finish: 26th (2010)
- First race: 2003 Mr. Goodcents 300 (Kansas)
- Last race: 2011 O'Reilly Auto Parts 300 (Texas)
Wins	Top tens	Poles
0	0	0

NASCAR FedEx Freight Truck Series career
- 36 races run over 3 years
- Best finish: 17th (2008)
- First race: 2004 Florida Dodge Dealers 250 (Daytona)
- Last race: 2010 Built Ford Tough 225 (Kentucky)
Wins	Top tens	Poles
0	2	0
- Statistics up to date as of April 13, 2010.

Shelby Dean Howard IV (born July 25, 1985) is an American former professional stock car racing driver. He has previously driven in the NASCAR Nationwide Series, the NASCAR Camping World Truck Series, and the ARCA Re/Max Series.

== Racing career ==
Howard began racing in 1996 in Junior Sprints. In his first season in the National Series, he finished fifth in points. He competed in various racing series. He won the points championship in the Mini Cup Series, as well as winning the Mini Cup championship at the Jefferson Speedrome, and the 250cc Mini Sprints Rookie of the Year at Miami County Speedway. In 1998, he moved up to the 600cc Adult Class at Miami County, and simultaneously won the championship and Rookie of the Year honors. He also became the youngest driver to win a feature race at the Indianapolis Speedrome.

In 1999, Howard joined the Jasper Modified Series, and won the Rookie of the Year award and finished fifth in the points standings. He also raced at Anderson Speedway, winning two feature races and the Rookie of the Year award. He won his first Jasper Modified feature race in 2000 at Winchester Speedway, becoming the youngest driver since Jeff Gordon to win a race in that series. He finished fifteenth in the Kendall Late Model Series points standings as well. He moved up to the ARCA RE/MAX Series in 2001, becoming the youngest driver ever to compete at the age of fifteen. The next season, he won ARCA's Sportsmanship Award.

Howard won his first ARCA race in 2003, becoming the youngest winner in the series, and finished third in the final standings. That same season, he moved up to NASCAR, making his debut in the Busch Series at Kansas Speedway. He finished twentieth in the No. 43 Dr Pepper Dodge fielded by the Curb Agajanian Performance Group. He also attempted his first Winston Cup race at Atlanta Motor Speedway, but failed to qualify. In 2004, he joined NASCAR's Craftsman Truck Series division, driving the new No. 23 Toyota Tundra for Bill Davis Racing. After eight races, he did not finish any higher than 21st, and was subsequently replaced by Johnny Benson. He ended the season running five races in the No. 35 Volvo Trucks/Snap-On Ford Taurus for Team Rensi Motorsports.

Howard joined Tony Stewart's USAR team in 2005, and had three poles and four top-tens in USAR's Northern Division. He had three wins in his first USAR season. In 2006, he returned to the Busch Series driving for Odle Motorsports at Memphis Motorsports Park. He finished 41st after being plagued by ignition failure. In 2007, he drove two races in the No. 01 for Johnny Davis Motorsports, his best finishing being a 27th at Kentucky Speedway. Howard returned to the Trucks with ThorSport Racing in 2008, but only managed two top-tens and a single top-five before he was released in favor of Johnny Sauter.

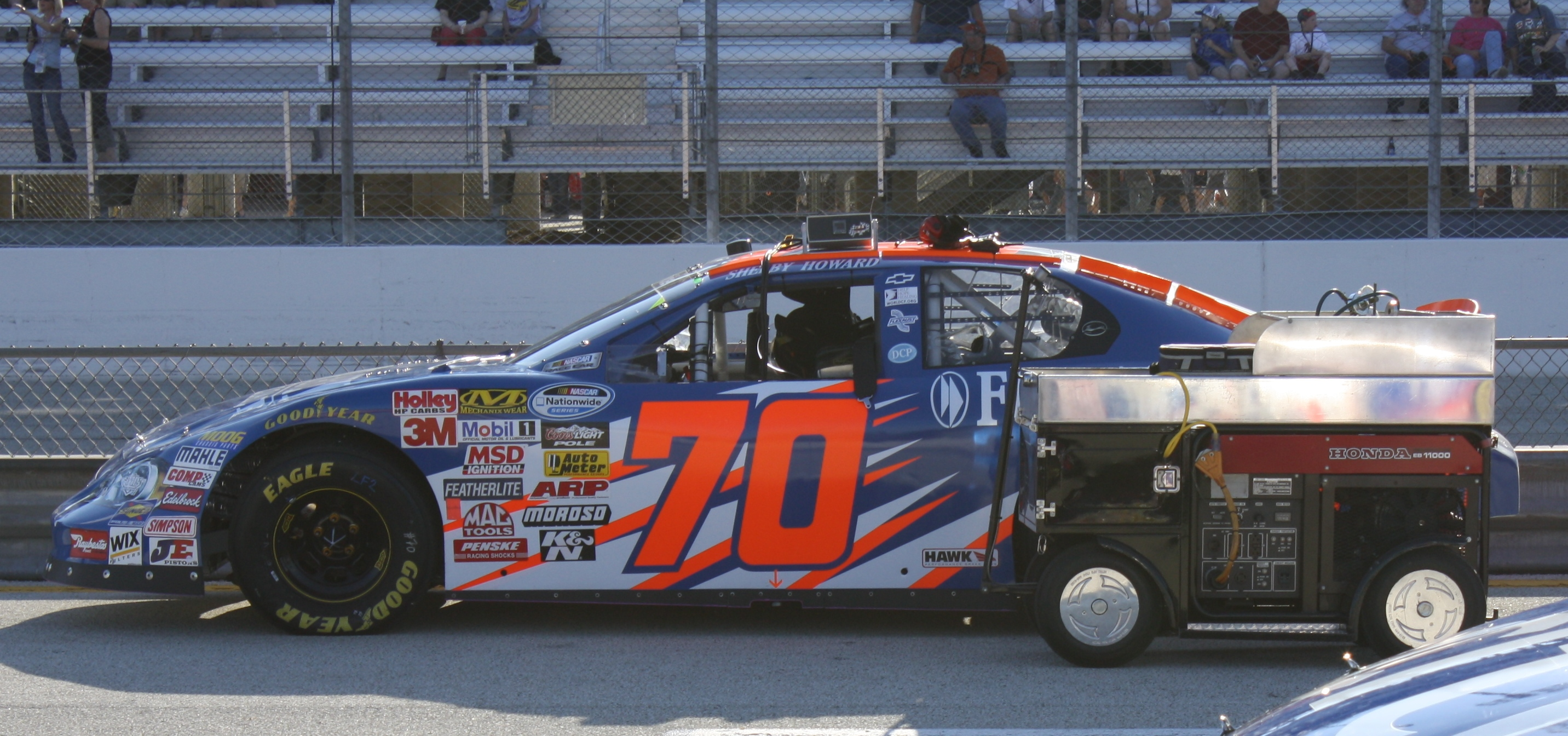
Howard's 2009 Nationwide #70 car

Howard started 2009 as a free agent, but was picked up by ML Motorsports to drive the No. 70 Foretravel Motorcoach Chevrolet after the team released Mark Green in late March. He would run a total of seventeen Nationwide races with a best finish of twelfth at the second Nashville race and Memphis Motorsports Park.

In 2010, Howard returned to ML Motorsports. Despite missing the season opening race at Daytona, Howard and ML ran 21 races with a best finish of twelfth at Gateway and Iowa. Howard returned to ML in 2011, but departed from the team after Texas. He has not raced in NASCAR since then.

== Motorsports career results ==
=== NASCAR ===
(key) (Bold – Pole position awarded by qualifying time. Italics – Pole position earned by points standings or practice time. * – Most laps led.)

==== Winston Cup Series ====
NASCAR Winston Cup Series results
Year	Team	No.	Make	1	2	3	4	5	6	7	8	9	10	11	12	13	14	15	16	17	18	19	20	21	22	23	24	25	26	27	28	29	30	31	32	33	34	35	36	NWCC	Pts	Ref
2003	Bill Davis Racing	27	Chevy	DAY	CAR	LVS	ATL	DAR	BRI	TEX	TAL	MAR	CAL	RCH	CLT	DOV	POC	MCH	SON	DAY	CHI	NHA	POC	IND	GLN	MCH	BRI	DAR	RCH	NHA	DOV	TAL	KAN	CLT	MAR	ATL; DNQ	PHO	CAR	HOM	NA	-	

==== Nationwide Series ====
NASCAR Nationwide Series results
Year	Team	No.	Make	1	2	3	4	5	6	7	8	9	10	11	12	13	14	15	16	17	18	19	20	21	22	23	24	25	26	27	28	29	30	31	32	33	34	35	NNC	Pts	Ref
2003	Curb Racing	43	Dodge	DAY	CAR	LVS	DAR	BRI	TEX	TAL	NSH	CAL	RCH	GTY	NZH	CLT	DOV	NSH	KEN	MLW	DAY	CHI	NHA	PPR	IRP	MCH	BRI	DAR	RCH	DOV	KAN; 20	CLT	MEM	ATL	PHO	CAR	HOM		120th	103	
2004	Team Rensi Motorsports	35	Ford	DAY	CAR	LVS	DAR	BRI	TEX	NSH	TAL	CAL	GTY	RCH	NZH	CLT	DOV	NSH	KEN	MLW	DAY	CHI	NHA	PPR	IRP; 24	MCH; DNQ	BRI	CAL	RCH; 25	DOV; 31	KAN	CLT	MEM; 36	ATL; 18	PHO	DAR	HOM		66th	413	
2006	Odle Motorsports	79	Chevy	DAY	CAL	MXC	LVS	ATL	BRI	TEX	NSH	PHO	TAL	RCH	DAR	CLT	DOV	NSH	KEN	MLW	DAY	CHI	NHA	MAR	GTY	IRP	GLN	MCH	BRI	CAL	RCH	DOV	KAN	CLT	MEM; 40	TEX	PHO	HOM	141st	43	
2007	D.D.L. Motorsports	01	Chevy	DAY	CAL	MXC	LVS	ATL	BRI	NSH	TEX	PHO	TAL	RCH	DAR	CLT	DOV	NSH	KEN; 27	MLW	NHA	DAY	CHI	GTY	IRP; 36	CGV	GLN	MCH	BRI	CAL	RCH	DOV	KAN	CLT	MEM	TEX	PHO	HOM	118th	137	
2008	ThorSport Racing	13	Chevy	DAY	CAL	LVS	ATL	BRI	NSH	TEX	PHO	MXC	TAL	RCH	DAR	CLT	DOV	NSH	KEN	MLW	NHA	DAY	CHI	GTY	IRP; 20	CGV	GLN	MCH	BRI; 23	CAL	RCH	DOV	KAN	CLT	MEM	TEX	PHO	HOM	94th	197	
2009	ML Motorsports	70	Chevy	DAY	CAL	LVS	BRI	TEX; 32	NSH; 14	PHO	TAL; 27	RCH; 13	DAR	CLT	DOV	NSH; 12	KEN; 26	MLW; 23	NHA	DAY	CHI; 26	GTY; 13	IRP; 19	IOW; DNQ	GLN	MCH; 18	BRI; DNQ	CGV	ATL; 21	RCH; 35	DOV	KAN; 26	CAL	CLT	MEM; 12	TEX; 31	PHO	HOM; 33	33rd	1603	
2010	ML Motorsports	70	Chevy	DAY; DNQ	CAL	LVS; 20	BRI; 34	NSH; 16	PHO	TEX; 25	TAL; 19	RCH; 30	DAR	DOV	CLT	NSH; 22	KEN; 17	ROA	NHA	DAY; 26	CHI; 20	GTY; 12	IRP; 14	IOW; 12	GLN	MCH; 23	BRI; 24	CGV	ATL	RCH; 24	DOV	KAN; 20	CAL	CLT; 39	GTY; 27	TEX; 28	PHO	HOM; 36	26th	1962	
2011	ML Motorsports	70	Chevy	DAY; 22	PHO; 28	LVS; 29	BRI; 27	CAL	TEX; 30	TAL	NSH	RCH	DAR	DOV	IOW	CLT	CHI	MCH	ROA	DAY	KEN	NHA	NSH	IRP	IOW	GLN	CGV	BRI	ATL	RCH	CHI	DOV	KAN	CLT	TEX	PHO	HOM		44th	84	

==== Camping World Truck Series ====
NASCAR Camping World Truck Series results
Year	Team	No.	Make	1	2	3	4	5	6	7	8	9	10	11	12	13	14	15	16	17	18	19	20	21	22	23	24	25	NCTC	Pts	Ref
2004	Bill Davis Racing	23	Toyota	DAY; 29	ATL; 25	MAR; 23	MFD; 23	CLT; 33	DOV	TEX; 21	MEM; 24	MLW; 21	KAN	KEN	GTW	MCH	IRP	NSH	BRI	RCH	NHA	LVS	CAL	TEX	MAR	PHO	DAR	HOM	33rd	692	
2008	ThorSport Racing	13	Chevy	DAY; 15	CAL; 25	ATL; 26	MAR; 34	KAN; 16	CLT; 20	MFD; 6	DOV; 19	TEX; 20	MCH; 19	MLW; 14	MEM; 16	KEN; 36	IRP; 5	NSH; 22	BRI; 26	GTW; 23	NHA; 14	LVS; 18	TAL; 17	MAR; 13	ATL; 22	TEX; 17	PHO; 19	HOM; 25	17th	2636	
2010	Kevin Harvick Incorporated	2	Chevy	DAY	ATL	MAR	NSH	KAN	DOV	CLT	TEX	MCH	IOW	GTY	IRP; 11	POC	NSH	DAR	BRI	CHI; 31	KEN; 19	NHA	LVS	MAR	TAL	TEX	PHO	HOM	63rd	306	

=== ARCA Re/Max Series ===
(key) (Bold – Pole position awarded by qualifying time. Italics – Pole position earned by points standings or practice time. * – Most laps led.)

ARCA Re/Max Series results
Year	Team	No.	Make	1	2	3	4	5	6	7	8	9	10	11	12	13	14	15	16	17	18	19	20	21	22	23	24	25	ARSC	Pts	Ref
2001	CIMCO Racing	64	Chevy	DAY	NSH	WIN	SLM	GTY	KEN	CLT	KAN	MCH	POC	MEM	GLN	KEN	MCH	POC	NSH	ISF	CHI	DSF	SLM; 6	TOL; 18	BLN; 6	CLT; 21	TAL	ATL; 30	49th	750	
2002	CIMCO Racing	64	Pontiac	DAY; 27																				TAL; 13					5th	4745	
2002	CIMCO Racing	64	Chevy		ATL; 9	NSH; 9	SLM; 21	KEN; 8	CLT; 19	KAN; 7	POC; 19	MCH; 30	TOL; 11	SBO; 13	KEN; 9	BLN; 12			ISF; 20	WIN; 2	DSF; 10	CHI; 40	SLM; 5						5th	4745	
2002	CIMCO Racing	64	Dodge														POC; 5	NSH; 12							CLT; 19				5th	4745	
2003	CIMCO Racing	64	Dodge	DAY; 37	ATL; 2	NSH; 36	SLM; 1*	TOL; 3	KEN; 4	CLT; 13	BLN; 6	KAN; 1	MCH; 23	LER; 5	POC; 5	POC; 23	NSH; 3	ISF; 33	WIN; 2	DSF; 24	CHI; 22	SLM; 1*		CLT; 8	SBO; 12				3rd	5015	
2003	CIMCO Racing	64	Chevy																				TAL; 27						3rd	5015	
