= Phillip McGilton =

American racing driver

- Born: October 6, 1978 (age 48); Wheeling, WV, U.S.

NASCAR FedEx Freight Truck Series career
- 4 races run over 1 year
- Best finish: 44th (2008)
- First race: 2008 Chevy Silverado 250 (Daytona)
- Last race: 2008 Kroger 250 (Martinsville)
| Wins | Top tens | Poles |
|---|---|---|
| 0 | 1 | 0 |
- Statistics up to date as of June 1, 2010.

Phillip McGilton (born October 6, 1978) is an American former professional stock car racing driver and businessman. He formed PJM Enterprises in 2002, a residential and commercial construction company that eventually grew into include automotive fabrication, and motorsports and educational ventures.

== Racing career ==
McGilton began racing at the age of eight in dirt bikes and moved up to the Arena Cross Series. After spending time as a rodeo competitor in steer wrestling, he resumed racing as a hobby in go-karts and off-road racing, before eventually moving up to stock cars. After graduating from Fast Track Driving School, he made his debut in the ARCA RE/MAX Series at Michigan International Speedway in 2006. In six starts in the No. 42 Ford, he earned a best finish of ninth at Kansas Speedway. In 2007, McGilton signed with the Brewco Motorsports driver development program in the No. 47 Ford Fusion, and finished sixth in points, runner-up to Michael McDowell for the SunTrust Rookie of the Year award. He earned eight top-tens, including a career best finish of 3rd at The Milwaukee Mile.

After the 2007 season, McGilton paid to race for Bill Davis Racing to drive the No. 22 Toyota Tundra in the NASCAR Craftsman Truck Series for the full 2008 season. In four races, he earned a best finish of tenth at California Speedway and did not finish worse than 16th. After the Kroger 250 at Martinsville, he was released and replaced by Scott Speed. After his release, his businesses were shut down.

== Motorsports career results ==
=== NASCAR ===
(key) (Bold – Pole position awarded by qualifying time. Italics – Pole position earned by points standings or practice time. * – Most laps led.)

==== Craftsman Truck Series ====
NASCAR Craftsman Truck Series results
| Year | Team | No. | Make | 1 | 2 | 3 | 4 | 5 | 6 | 7 | 8 | 9 | 10 | 11 | 12 | 13 | 14 | 15 | 16 | 17 | 18 | 19 | 20 | 21 | 22 | 23 | 24 | 25 | NCTC | Pts | Ref |
|---|---|---|---|---|---|---|---|---|---|---|---|---|---|---|---|---|---|---|---|---|---|---|---|---|---|---|---|---|---|---|---|
| 2008 | Bill Davis Racing | 22 | Toyota | DAY; 12 | CAL; 10 | ATL; 16 | MAR; 16 | KAN | CLT | MFD | DOV | TEX | MCH | MLW | MEM | KEN | IRP | NSH | BRI | GTW | NHA | LVS | TAL | MAR | ATL | TEX | PHO | HOM | 44th | 491 | |

=== ARCA Re/Max Series ===
(key) (Bold – Pole position awarded by qualifying time. Italics – Pole position earned by points standings or practice time. * – Most laps led.)

ARCA Re/Max Series results
| Year | Team | No. | Make | 1 | 2 | 3 | 4 | 5 | 6 | 7 | 8 | 9 | 10 | 11 | 12 | 13 | 14 | 15 | 16 | 17 | 18 | 19 | 20 | 21 | 22 | 23 | ARSC | Pts | Ref |
|---|---|---|---|---|---|---|---|---|---|---|---|---|---|---|---|---|---|---|---|---|---|---|---|---|---|---|---|---|---|
| 2006 | Phillip McGilton | 42 | Ford | DAY | NSH; DNQ | SLM | WIN | | | | MCH; 34 | KAN; 9 | KEN; 40 | BLN | POC | GTW | NSH; 34 | MCH; DNQ | ISF | MIL | TOL | DSF | CHI; 32 | SLM | | IOW; 40 | 64th | 535 | |
| 2006 | Bob Schacht Motorsports | 75 | Chevy | | | | | KEN; DNQ | TOL | POC | | | | | | | | | | | | | | | | | 64th | 535 | |
| 2006 | Phillip McGilton | 42 | Chevy | | | | | | | | | | | | | | | | | | | | | | TAL; DNQ | | 64th | 535 | |
| 2007 | Brewco Motorsports | 47 | Chevy | DAY; 9 | | | | | | | | | | | | | | | | | | | | | | | 6th | 4745 | |
| 2007 | Brewco Motorsports | 47 | Ford | | USA; 13 | NSH; 17 | SLM; 7 | KAN; 18 | WIN; 30 | KEN; 8 | TOL; 27 | IOW; 4 | POC; 19 | MCH; 6 | BLN; 14 | KEN; 29 | POC; 30 | NSH; 14 | ISF; 10 | MIL; 3 | GTW; 11 | DSF; 14 | CHI; 26 | SLM; 28 | TAL; 21 | TOL; 10 | 6th | 4745 | |
