= 2007 UAW-DaimlerChrysler 400 =

Third race of the 2007 NASCAR Nextel Cup Series

Race details
- Race 3 of 36 in the 2007 NASCAR Nextel Cup Series
- The 2007 UAW-DaimlerChrysler 400 program cover.
- Date: March 11, 2007
- Official name: 10th Annual UAW-DaimlerChrysler 400
- Location: North Las Vegas, Nevada, Las Vegas Motor Speedway
- Course: Permanent racing facility
- Course length: 1.5 miles (2.41 km)
- Distance: 267 laps, 400.5 mi (644.542 km)
- Average speed: 128.183 miles per hour (206.291 km/h)

Pole position
Driver	Kasey Kahne	Evernham Motorsports
- Time: 29.212

Most laps led
Driver	Jeff Gordon	Hendrick Motorsports
- Laps: 111

Winner
No. 48	Jimmie Johnson	Hendrick Motorsports

Television in the United States
- Network: FOX
- Announcers: Mike Joy, Larry McReynolds, Darrell Waltrip

Radio in the United States
- Radio: Motor Racing Network

The 2007 UAW-DaimlerChrysler 400 was the third stock car race of the 2007 NASCAR Nextel Cup Series and the 10th iteration of the event. The race was held on Sunday, March 11, 2007, before an audience of 156,000 in North Las Vegas, Nevada at Las Vegas Motor Speedway, a 1.5 miles (2.4 km) permanent D-shaped oval racetrack. The race took the scheduled 267 laps to complete. In the final laps of the race, Hendrick Motorsports driver Jimmie Johnson would manage to mount a late-race charge to the front, passing for the lead with 28 laps to go in the race to take his 24th career NASCAR Nextel Cup Series victory and his first victory of the season. To fill out the top three, Hendrick Motorsports driver Jeff Gordon and Joe Gibbs Racing driver Denny Hamlin would finish second and third, respectively.

== Background ==
The layout of Las Vegas Motor Speedway, the circuit where the race was held.

Las Vegas Motor Speedway, located in Clark County, Nevada in Las Vegas, Nevada about 15 miles northeast of the Las Vegas Strip, is a 1,200-acre (490 ha) complex of multiple tracks for motorsports racing. The complex is owned by Speedway Motorsports, Inc., which is headquartered in Charlotte, North Carolina.

=== Entry list ===
- (R) denotes rookie driver.

#	Driver	Team	Make	Sponsor
00	David Reutimann (R)	Michael Waltrip Racing	Toyota	Domino's
1	Martin Truex Jr.	Dale Earnhardt, Inc.	Chevrolet	Bass Pro Shops, Tracker Boats
01	Mark Martin	Ginn Racing	Chevrolet	U.S. Army
2	Kurt Busch	Penske Racing South	Dodge	Miller Lite
4	Ward Burton	Morgan–McClure Motorsports	Chevrolet	State Water Heaters
5	Kyle Busch	Hendrick Motorsports	Chevrolet	Kellogg's, Carquest
6	David Ragan (R)	Roush Fenway Racing	Ford	AAA
7	Robby Gordon	Robby Gordon Motorsports	Ford	Robby Gordon Motorsports
07	Clint Bowyer	Richard Childress Racing	Chevrolet	Jack Daniel's
8	Dale Earnhardt Jr.	Dale Earnhardt, Inc.	Chevrolet	Budweiser
9	Kasey Kahne	Evernham Motorsports	Dodge	McDonald's, Dodge
10	Scott Riggs	Evernham Motorsports	Dodge	Auto Value Bumper To Bumper
11	Denny Hamlin	Joe Gibbs Racing	Chevrolet	FedEx Kinko's
12	Ryan Newman	Penske Racing South	Dodge	Alltel
13	Joe Nemechek	Ginn Racing	Chevrolet	CertainTeed
14	Sterling Marlin	Ginn Racing	Chevrolet	Waste Management
15	Paul Menard (R)	Dale Earnhardt, Inc.	Chevrolet	Menards, Johns Manville
16	Greg Biffle	Roush Fenway Racing	Ford	Ameriquest Mortgage
17	Matt Kenseth	Roush Fenway Racing	Ford	DeWalt
18	J. J. Yeley	Joe Gibbs Racing	Chevrolet	Interstate Batteries
19	Elliott Sadler	Evernham Motorsports	Dodge	Dodge, UAW-Daimler Chrysler 400
20	Tony Stewart	Joe Gibbs Racing	Chevrolet	The Home Depot
21	Jon Wood	Wood Brothers Racing	Ford	U.S. Air Force
22	Dave Blaney	Bill Davis Racing	Toyota	Caterpillar
24	Jeff Gordon	Hendrick Motorsports	Chevrolet	Nicorette, DuPont
25	Casey Mears	Hendrick Motorsports	Chevrolet	National Guard, GMAC
26	Jamie McMurray	Roush Fenway Racing	Ford	Crown Royal
29	Kevin Harvick	Richard Childress Racing	Chevrolet	Shell, Pennzoil
31	Jeff Burton	Richard Childress Racing	Chevrolet	Cingular Wireless
34	Kevin Lepage	Front Row Motorsports	Dodge	Front Row Motorsports
36	Jeremy Mayfield	Bill Davis Racing	Toyota	360 OTC, WrestleMania 23
37	John Andretti	Front Row Motorsports	Dodge	Camping World
38	David Gilliland	Robert Yates Racing	Ford	M&M's
40	David Stremme	Chip Ganassi Racing	Dodge	Coors Light
41	Reed Sorenson	Chip Ganassi Racing	Dodge	Target
42	Juan Pablo Montoya (R)	Chip Ganassi Racing	Dodge	Texaco, Havoline
43	Bobby Labonte	Petty Enterprises	Dodge	Cheerios
44	Dale Jarrett	Michael Waltrip Racing	Toyota	UPS
45	Kyle Petty	Petty Enterprises	Dodge	Wells Fargo
47	Ken Schrader	Wood Brothers/JTG Racing	Ford	Ore-Ida, Kingsford, Clorox
48	Jimmie Johnson	Hendrick Motorsports	Chevrolet	Lowe's
49	Mike Bliss	BAM Racing	Dodge	Zone Loans
55	Michael Waltrip	Michael Waltrip Racing	Toyota	NAPA Auto Parts
66	Jeff Green	Haas CNC Racing	Chevrolet	Samsung Four Seasons of Hope
70	Johnny Sauter	Haas CNC Racing	Chevrolet	Yellow Transportation
72	Brandon Whitt	CJM Racing	Chevrolet	Dutch Quality Stone
78	Kenny Wallace	Furniture Row Racing	Chevrolet	Furniture Row
80	Aric Almirola	Joe Gibbs Racing	Chevrolet	Joe Gibbs Driven Racing Oil
83	Brian Vickers	Red Bull Racing Team	Toyota	Red Bull
84	A. J. Allmendinger (R)	Red Bull Racing Team	Toyota	Red Bull
88	Ricky Rudd	Robert Yates Racing	Ford	Snickers
96	Tony Raines	Hall of Fame Racing	Chevrolet	DLP HDTV, Texas Instruments
99	Carl Edwards	Roush Fenway Racing	Ford	Office Depot
Official entry list

== Practice ==
=== First practice ===
The first practice session was held on Friday, March 9, at 2:30 PM EST. The session would last for one hour and 30 minutes. Kasey Kahne, driving for Evernham Motorsports, would set the fastest time in the session, with a lap of 29.840 and an average speed of 180.965 miles per hour (291.235 km/h).

Pos.	#	Driver	Team	Make	Time	Speed
1	9	Kasey Kahne	Evernham Motorsports	Dodge	29.840	180.965
2	38	David Gilliland	Robert Yates Racing	Ford	29.921	180.475
3	01	Mark Martin	Ginn Racing	Chevrolet	30.073	179.563
Full first practice results

=== Second practice ===
The second practice session was held on Saturday, March 10, at 12:00 PM EST. The session would last for 50 minutes. Clint Bowyer, driving for Richard Childress Racing, would set the fastest time in the session, with a lap of 30.219 and an average speed of 178.695 miles per hour (287.582 km/h).

Pos.	#	Driver	Team	Make	Time	Speed
1	07	Clint Bowyer	Richard Childress Racing	Chevrolet	30.219	178.695
2	48	Jimmie Johnson	Hendrick Motorsports	Chevrolet	30.222	178.678
3	42	Juan Pablo Montoya (R)	Chip Ganassi Racing	Dodge	30.246	178.536
Full second practice results

=== Final practice ===
The final practice session, sometimes referred to as Happy Hour, was held on Saturday, March 10, at 1:20 PM EST. The session would last for one hour. Clint Bowyer, driving for Richard Childress Racing, would set the fastest time in the session, with a lap of 30.385 and an average speed of 177.719 miles per hour (286.011 km/h).

Pos.	#	Driver	Team	Make	Time	Speed
1	07	Clint Bowyer	Richard Childress Racing	Chevrolet	30.385	177.719
2	01	Mark Martin	Ginn Racing	Chevrolet	30.506	177.014
3	31	Jeff Burton	Richard Childress Racing	Chevrolet	30.516	176.956
Full Happy Hour practice results

== Qualifying ==
Qualifying was held on Friday, March 9, at 6:10 PM EST. Each driver would have two laps to set a fastest time; the fastest of the two would count as their official qualifying lap. While positions 1-42 would be determined by qualifying speed, the top 35 teams in owner's points would be assured that they would earn a spot in the field if they had managed to make an effort to qualify. The remaining seven positions from positions 36-42 would be assigned to those drivers with the fastest qualifying speeds whose car owners are not among the top 35. The final starting position, position 43, can be utilized by a car owner whose driver is a current or past NASCAR NEXTEL Cup champion who participated as a driver during the current of previous season and was entered in the event for that owner in that car prior to the entry deadline. In the case that iff there was more than one series champion vying for the position, it would be given to the most recent series champion. If the final provisional starting position is not filled by a current or past series champion, it will be assigned to the next eligible car owner according to qualifying results.

Kasey Kahne, driving for Evernham Motorsports, would win the pole, setting a time of 29.212 and an average speed of 184.855 miles per hour (297.495 km/h).

Ten drivers would fail to qualify.

=== Full qualifying results ===
Pos.	#	Driver	Team	Make	Time	Speed
1	9	Kasey Kahne	Evernham Motorsports	Dodge	29.212	184.855
2	40	David Stremme	Chip Ganassi Racing	Dodge	29.317	184.193
3	19	Elliott Sadler	Evernham Motorsports	Dodge	29.368	183.874
4	42	Juan Pablo Montoya (R)	Chip Ganassi Racing	Dodge	29.478	183.188
5	31	Jeff Burton	Richard Childress Racing	Chevrolet	29.512	182.976
6	10	Scott Riggs	Evernham Motorsports	Dodge	29.530	182.865
7	41	Reed Sorenson	Chip Ganassi Racing	Dodge	29.537	182.822
8	14	Sterling Marlin	Ginn Racing	Chevrolet	29.585	182.525
9	13	Joe Nemechek	Ginn Racing	Chevrolet	29.627	182.266
10	2	Kurt Busch	Penske Racing South	Dodge	29.667	182.020
11	22	Dave Blaney	Bill Davis Racing	Toyota	29.707	181.775
12	5	Kyle Busch	Hendrick Motorsports	Chevrolet	29.709	181.763
13	99	Carl Edwards	Roush Fenway Racing	Ford	29.741	181.568
14	01	Mark Martin	Ginn Racing	Chevrolet	29.753	181.494
15	78	Kenny Wallace	Furniture Row Racing	Chevrolet	29.772	181.378
16	07	Clint Bowyer	Richard Childress Racing	Chevrolet	29.786	181.293
17	11	Denny Hamlin	Joe Gibbs Racing	Chevrolet	29.822	181.074
18	16	Greg Biffle	Roush Fenway Racing	Ford	29.829	181.032
19	15	Paul Menard (R)	Dale Earnhardt, Inc.	Chevrolet	29.842	180.953
20	29	Kevin Harvick	Richard Childress Racing	Chevrolet	29.850	180.904
21	38	David Gilliland	Robert Yates Racing	Ford	29.852	180.892
22	45	Kyle Petty	Petty Enterprises	Dodge	29.853	180.886
23	48	Jimmie Johnson	Hendrick Motorsports	Chevrolet	29.864	180.820
24	18	J. J. Yeley	Joe Gibbs Racing	Chevrolet	29.867	180.802
25	20	Tony Stewart	Joe Gibbs Racing	Chevrolet	29.901	180.596
26	1	Martin Truex Jr.	Dale Earnhardt, Inc.	Chevrolet	29.910	180.542
27	96	Tony Raines	Hall of Fame Racing	Chevrolet	29.919	180.487
28	8	Dale Earnhardt Jr.	Dale Earnhardt, Inc.	Chevrolet	29.932	180.409
29	66	Jeff Green	Haas CNC Racing	Chevrolet	29.949	180.307
30	4	Ward Burton	Morgan–McClure Motorsports	Chevrolet	29.957	180.258
31	80	Aric Almirola	Joe Gibbs Racing	Chevrolet	29.971	180.174
32	70	Johnny Sauter	Haas CNC Racing	Chevrolet	29.974	180.156
33	26	Jamie McMurray	Roush Fenway Racing	Ford	29.985	180.090
34	25	Casey Mears	Hendrick Motorsports	Chevrolet	29.990	180.060
35	6	David Ragan (R)	Roush Fenway Racing	Ford	30.029	179.826
36	24	Jeff Gordon	Hendrick Motorsports	Chevrolet	30.061	179.635
37	17	Matt Kenseth	Roush Fenway Racing	Ford	30.090	179.462
38	7	Robby Gordon	Robby Gordon Motorsports	Ford	30.110	179.342
39	12	Ryan Newman	Penske Racing South	Dodge	30.131	179.217
Qualified by owner's points
40	88	Ricky Rudd	Robert Yates Racing	Ford	30.159	179.051
41	21	Jon Wood	Wood Brothers Racing	Ford	30.704	175.873
42	43	Bobby Labonte	Petty Enterprises	Dodge	-	-
Champion's Provisional
43	44	Dale Jarrett	Michael Waltrip Racing	Toyota	30.531	176.869
Failed to qualify
44	84	A. J. Allmendinger (R)	Red Bull Racing Team	Toyota	30.006	179.964
45	49	Mike Bliss	BAM Racing	Dodge	30.037	179.778
46	37	John Andretti	Front Row Motorsports	Dodge	30.130	179.223
47	83	Brian Vickers	Red Bull Racing Team	Toyota	30.167	179.003
48	00	David Reutimann (R)	Michael Waltrip Racing	Toyota	30.240	178.571
49	36	Jeremy Mayfield	Bill Davis Racing	Toyota	30.464	177.258
50	72	Brandon Whitt	CJM Racing	Chevrolet	30.591	176.523
51	34	Kevin Lepage	Front Row Motorsports	Dodge	30.788	175.393
52	55	Michael Waltrip	Michael Waltrip Racing	Toyota	31.138	173.421
53	47	Ken Schrader	Wood Brothers/JTG Racing	Ford	-	-
Official qualifying results

== Race results ==
Fin	St	#	Driver	Team	Make	Laps	Led	Status	Pts	Winnings
1	23	48	Jimmie Johnson	Hendrick Motorsports	Chevrolet	267	89	running	190	$415,386
2	36	24	Jeff Gordon	Hendrick Motorsports	Chevrolet	267	111	running	180	$287,011
3	17	11	Denny Hamlin	Joe Gibbs Racing	Chevrolet	267	0	running	165	$212,225
4	37	17	Matt Kenseth	Roush Fenway Racing	Ford	267	1	running	165	$208,941
5	14	01	Mark Martin	Ginn Racing	Chevrolet	267	15	running	160	$180,783
6	13	99	Carl Edwards	Roush Fenway Racing	Ford	267	3	running	155	$128,625
7	25	20	Tony Stewart	Joe Gibbs Racing	Chevrolet	267	0	running	146	$158,436
8	39	12	Ryan Newman	Penske Racing South	Dodge	267	1	running	147	$143,225
9	12	5	Kyle Busch	Hendrick Motorsports	Chevrolet	267	4	running	143	$116,250
10	33	26	Jamie McMurray	Roush Fenway Racing	Ford	267	0	running	134	$117,825
11	28	8	Dale Earnhardt Jr.	Dale Earnhardt, Inc.	Chevrolet	267	1	running	135	$144,233
12	26	1	Martin Truex Jr.	Dale Earnhardt, Inc.	Chevrolet	267	2	running	132	$128,170
13	42	43	Bobby Labonte	Petty Enterprises	Dodge	267	3	running	129	$138,461
14	3	19	Elliott Sadler	Evernham Motorsports	Dodge	267	17	running	126	$125,170
15	5	31	Jeff Burton	Richard Childress Racing	Chevrolet	267	4	running	123	$135,716
16	18	16	Greg Biffle	Roush Fenway Racing	Ford	266	0	running	115	$111,575
17	38	7	Robby Gordon	Robby Gordon Motorsports	Ford	266	0	running	112	$96,375
18	24	18	J. J. Yeley	Joe Gibbs Racing	Chevrolet	266	1	running	114	$123,183
19	27	96	Tony Raines	Hall of Fame Racing	Chevrolet	266	0	running	106	$104,675
20	2	40	David Stremme	Chip Ganassi Racing	Dodge	266	0	running	103	$95,925
21	21	38	David Gilliland	Robert Yates Racing	Ford	265	0	running	100	$119,189
22	4	42	Juan Pablo Montoya (R)	Chip Ganassi Racing	Dodge	265	0	running	97	$126,950
23	6	10	Scott Riggs	Evernham Motorsports	Dodge	265	0	running	94	$98,725
24	15	78	Kenny Wallace	Furniture Row Racing	Chevrolet	265	0	running	91	$85,550
25	29	66	Jeff Green	Haas CNC Racing	Chevrolet	265	0	running	88	$112,308
26	10	2	Kurt Busch	Penske Racing South	Dodge	265	0	running	85	$120,708
27	20	29	Kevin Harvick	Richard Childress Racing	Chevrolet	265	0	running	82	$131,286
28	22	45	Kyle Petty	Petty Enterprises	Dodge	265	0	running	79	$98,708
29	41	21	Jon Wood	Wood Brothers Racing	Ford	264	0	running	76	$104,064
30	40	88	Ricky Rudd	Robert Yates Racing	Ford	264	0	running	73	$112,608
31	7	41	Reed Sorenson	Chip Ganassi Racing	Dodge	263	0	running	70	$100,533
32	19	15	Paul Menard (R)	Dale Earnhardt, Inc.	Chevrolet	263	0	running	67	$80,675
33	43	44	Dale Jarrett	Michael Waltrip Racing	Toyota	263	0	running	64	$81,425
34	8	14	Sterling Marlin	Ginn Racing	Chevrolet	251	1	engine	66	$89,822
35	1	9	Kasey Kahne	Evernham Motorsports	Dodge	251	13	crash	63	$138,741
36	16	07	Clint Bowyer	Richard Childress Racing	Chevrolet	239	1	running	60	$87,850
37	35	6	David Ragan (R)	Roush Fenway Racing	Ford	236	0	running	52	$115,450
38	9	13	Joe Nemechek	Ginn Racing	Chevrolet	156	0	crash	49	$79,425
39	32	70	Johnny Sauter	Haas CNC Racing	Chevrolet	147	0	running	46	$79,225
40	34	25	Casey Mears	Hendrick Motorsports	Chevrolet	141	0	running	43	$86,975
41	31	80	Aric Almirola	Joe Gibbs Racing	Chevrolet	46	0	crash	40	$78,775
42	11	22	Dave Blaney	Bill Davis Racing	Toyota	17	0	crash	37	$86,630
43	30	4	Ward Burton	Morgan–McClure Motorsports	Chevrolet	15	0	crash	34	$79,452
Failed to qualify
44		84	A. J. Allmendinger (R)	Red Bull Racing Team	Toyota					
45		49	Mike Bliss	BAM Racing	Dodge					
46		37	John Andretti	Front Row Motorsports	Dodge					
47		83	Brian Vickers	Red Bull Racing Team	Toyota					
48		00	David Reutimann (R)	Michael Waltrip Racing	Toyota					
49		36	Jeremy Mayfield	Bill Davis Racing	Toyota					
50		72	Brandon Whitt	CJM Racing	Chevrolet					
51		34	Kevin Lepage	Front Row Motorsports	Dodge					
52		55	Michael Waltrip	Michael Waltrip Racing	Toyota					
53		47	Ken Schrader	Wood Brothers/JTG Racing	Ford					
Official race results

== Standings after the race ==
Drivers' Championship standings

	Pos	Driver	Points
	1	Mark Martin	495
1	2	Jeff Gordon	489 (-6)
1	3	Jeff Burton	453 (-42)
11	4	Jimmie Johnson	406 (–89)
6	5	Matt Kenseth	397 (–98)
2	6	Kevin Harvick	389 (–106)
2	7	Kyle Busch	382 (–113)
10	8	Denny Hamlin	374 (–121)
1	9	J. J. Yeley	365 (–130)
6	10	Elliott Sadler	342 (–153)
1	11	David Stremme	339 (–156)
1	12	David Gilliland	335 (–160)
Official driver's standings

- Note: Only the first 12 positions are included for the driver standings.

Previous race: 2007 Auto Club 500	NASCAR Nextel Cup Series; 2007 season	Next race: 2007 Kobalt Tools 500
