= 2008 NASCAR Craftsman Truck Series =

American motorsport season

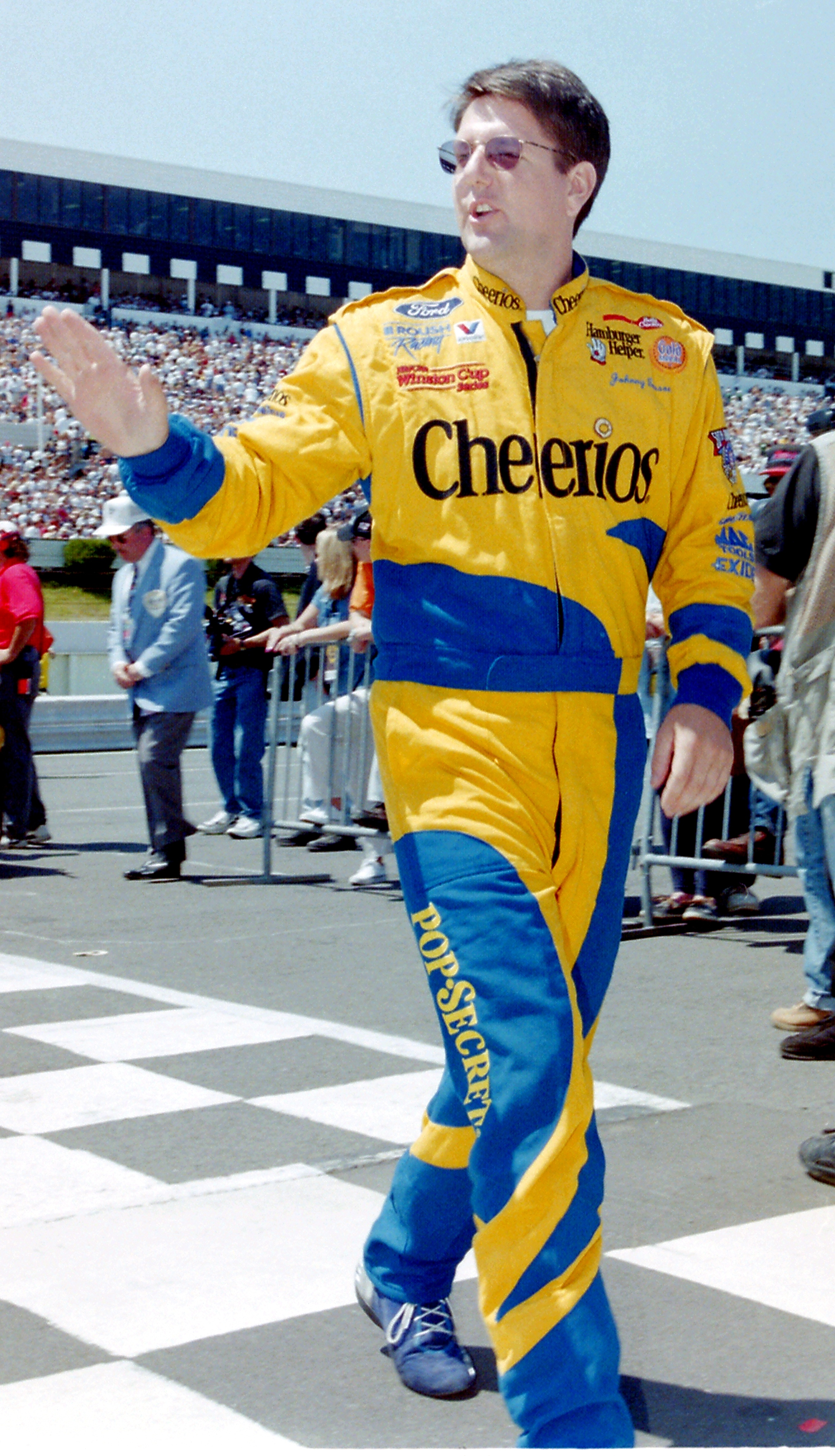
Johnny Benson, shown here in 1998, the 2008 Craftsman Truck Series champion.

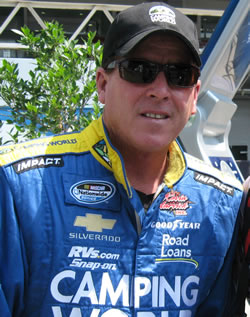
Ron Hornaday, Jr came in second behind Benson Jr. by just 7 points.

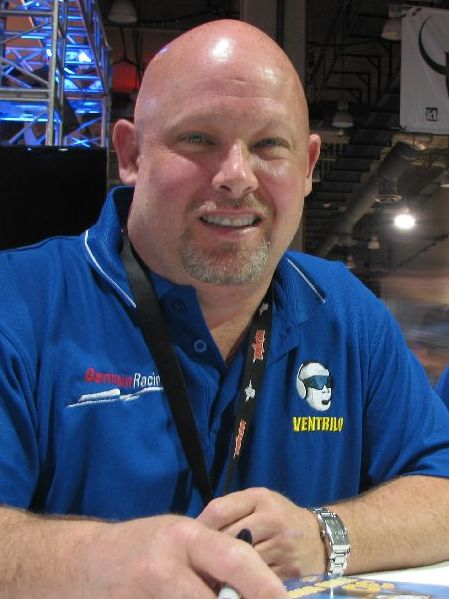
Todd Bodine finished third in the championship.

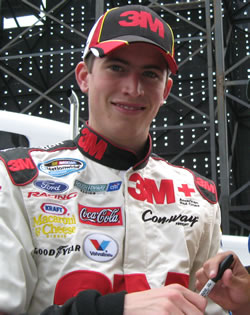
Colin Braun, the Craftsman Truck Series Rookie of the Year.

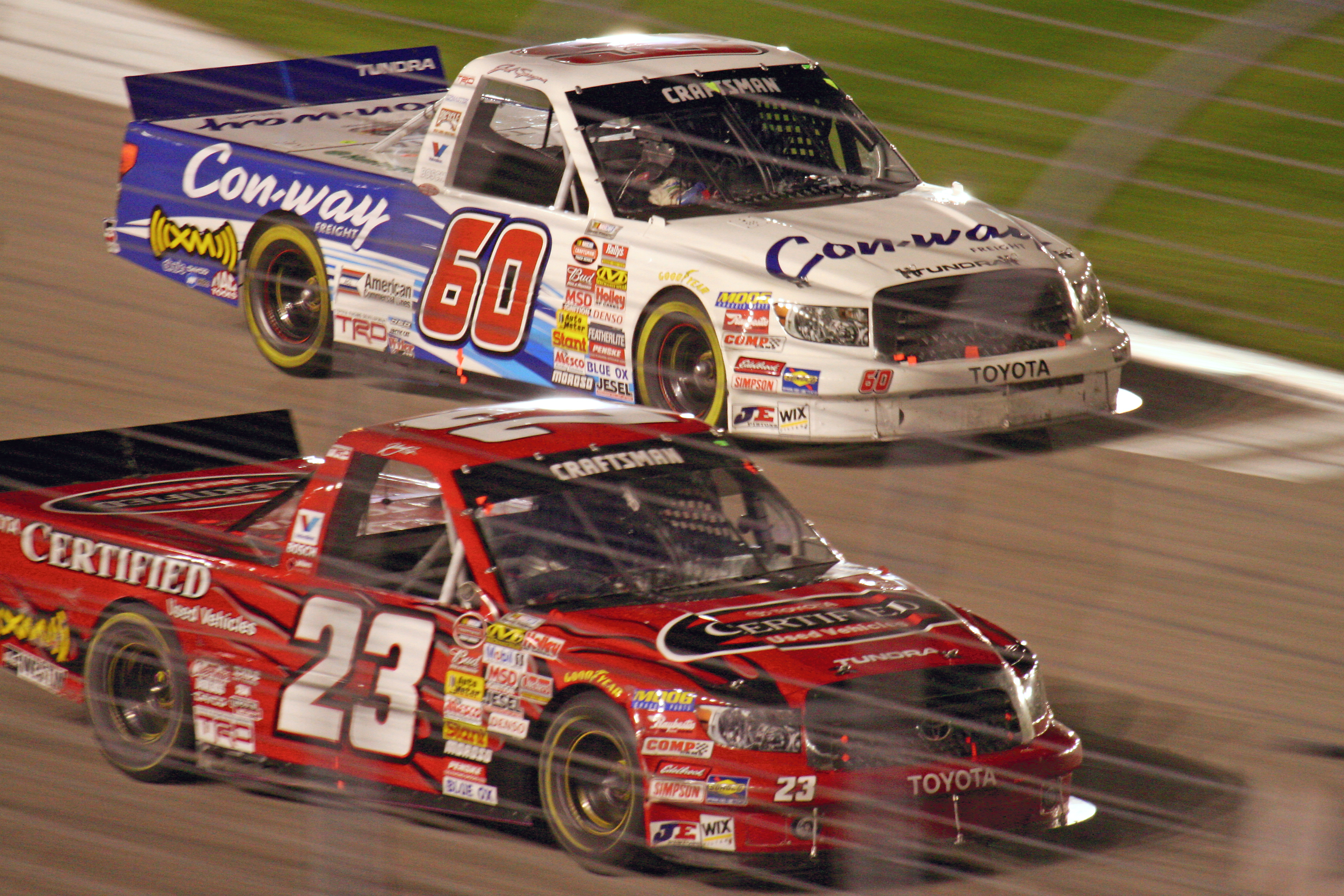
Toyota won their third consecutive manufacturers' championship with 13 wins.

The 2008 NASCAR Craftsman Truck Series was the fourteenth season of the Craftsman Truck Series, the pickup truck racing series sanctioned by NASCAR in the United States. It was contested over twenty-five races, beginning with the Chevy Silverado HD 250 at Daytona International Speedway and ending with the Ford 200 at Homestead–Miami Speedway. Johnny Benson of Bill Davis Racing was crowned champion. The season was also the last under the Craftsman sponsorship banner until the 2023 season. Sears Holdings Corporation, the owners of the Craftsman brand name of tools, withdrew sponsorship at the end of the season. On October 23, NASCAR officials confirmed that Camping World would become the title sponsor beginning with the 2009 season.

== 2008 teams and drivers ==
=== Full-time teams ===
Manufacturer	Team	No.	Driver(s)	Crew chief
Chevrolet	Kevin Harvick, Inc.	2	Jack Sprague 20	Ernie Cope
Chevrolet	Kevin Harvick, Inc.	2	Kevin Harvick 3	Ernie Cope
Chevrolet	Kevin Harvick, Inc.	2	Ryan Newman 1	Ernie Cope
Chevrolet	Kevin Harvick, Inc.	2	Cale Gale 1	Ernie Cope
Chevrolet	Kevin Harvick, Inc.	33	Ron Hornaday Jr.	Rick Ren
Chevrolet	Key Motorsports	40	Chad Chaffin 14	Gary Showalter
Chevrolet	Key Motorsports	40	Paul Poulter 2	Gary Showalter
Chevrolet	Key Motorsports	40	Jeff Green 8	Gary Showalter
Chevrolet	Key Motorsports	40	Mike Bliss 1	Gary Showalter
Chevrolet	Morgan-Dollar Motorsports 12; Randy Moss Motorsports 13	46; 81	Erin Crocker 2	Eric Phillips
Chevrolet	Morgan-Dollar Motorsports 12; Randy Moss Motorsports 13	46; 81	Scott Speed (R) 2	Eric Phillips
Chevrolet	Morgan-Dollar Motorsports 12; Randy Moss Motorsports 13	46; 81	Landon Cassill 7	Eric Phillips
Chevrolet	Morgan-Dollar Motorsports 12; Randy Moss Motorsports 13	46; 81	Aric Almirola 1	Eric Phillips
Chevrolet	Morgan-Dollar Motorsports 12; Randy Moss Motorsports 13	46; 81	Regan Smith 1	Eric Phillips
Chevrolet	Morgan-Dollar Motorsports 12; Randy Moss Motorsports 13	46; 81	Willie Allen 3	Eric Phillips
Chevrolet	Morgan-Dollar Motorsports 12; Randy Moss Motorsports 13	46; 81	Jimmie Johnson 1	Eric Phillips
Chevrolet	Morgan-Dollar Motorsports 12; Randy Moss Motorsports 13	46; 81	Marc Davis 1	Eric Phillips
Chevrolet	Morgan-Dollar Motorsports 12; Randy Moss Motorsports 13	46; 81	Donny Lia (R) 7	Eric Phillips
Chevrolet	MRD Motorsports	8	Chad McCumbee	Steve Genenbacher 2 Dave Wachtel 1 Randy Dean 22
Chevrolet	ThorSport Racing	13	Shelby Howard	Lance Hooper
Chevrolet	ThorSport Racing	88	Matt Crafton	Bud Haefele
Chevrolet	TRG Motorsports	7	Andy Lally (R) 8	Butch Hylton
Chevrolet	TRG Motorsports	7	T. J. Bell 17	Butch Hylton
Dodge	Bobby Hamilton Racing-Virginia	18	Dennis Setzer	Marcus Richmond
Dodge	SS-Green Light Racing	08	Jason White 23	Doug Howe 17; Bobby Dotter 8
Dodge	SS-Green Light Racing	08	Bobby Dotter 1	Doug Howe 17; Bobby Dotter 8
Dodge	SS-Green Light Racing	08	Ryan Lawler 1	Doug Howe 17; Bobby Dotter 8
Ford	Circle Bar Racing	10	Brendan Gaughan	Bryan Berry
Ford	Circle Bar Racing	14	Rick Crawford	Kevin Starland
Ford	Roush Fenway Racing	09	Joey Clanton 1	John Quinn 3 Chad Norris 22
Ford	Roush Fenway Racing	09	Travis Kvapil 9	John Quinn 3 Chad Norris 22
Ford	Roush Fenway Racing	09	Bobby East 7	John Quinn 3 Chad Norris 22
Ford	Roush Fenway Racing	09	John Wes Townley 7	John Quinn 3 Chad Norris 22
Ford	Roush Fenway Racing	09	Jamie McMurray 1	John Quinn 3 Chad Norris 22
Ford	Roush Fenway Racing	6	Colin Braun (R)	Mike Beam
Ford	Roush Fenway Racing	99	Erik Darnell	Matt Puccia
Ford	Wood Brothers Racing	21	Jon Wood 17	John Monsam 21; Mike Smith 2 Gere Kennon Jr. 2
Ford	Wood Brothers Racing	21	Keven Wood 8	John Monsam 21; Mike Smith 2 Gere Kennon Jr. 2
Toyota	Bill Davis Racing	5	Mike Skinner	Jeff Hensley 11; Joe Lax 6 Doug Richert 7
Toyota	Bill Davis Racing	22	Phillip McGilton (R) 4	Doug Wolcott
Toyota	Bill Davis Racing	22	Scott Speed (R) 14	Doug Wolcott
Toyota	Bill Davis Racing	22	Michael Annett (R) 7	Doug Wolcott
Toyota	Bill Davis Racing	23	Johnny Benson	Tripp Bruce
Toyota	Billy Ballew Motorsports	51	Kyle Busch 18	Richie Wauters
Toyota	Billy Ballew Motorsports	51	Shane Sieg 6	Richie Wauters
Toyota	Billy Ballew Motorsports	51	Mike Bliss 1	Richie Wauters
Toyota	Germain Racing	9	Justin Marks (R) 18	Jason Overstreet
Toyota	Germain Racing	9	David Reutimann 1	Jason Overstreet
Toyota	Germain Racing	9	Mike Wallace 1	Jason Overstreet
Toyota	Germain Racing	9	Sean Caisse 1	Jason Overstreet
Toyota	Germain Racing	9	Chrissy Wallace 2	Jason Overstreet
Toyota	Germain Racing	9	Paul Tracy 1	Jason Overstreet
Toyota	Germain Racing	9	Michael Annett (R) 1	Jason Overstreet
Toyota	Germain Racing	30	Todd Bodine	Mike Hillman Jr.
Toyota	HT Motorsports	59	Ted Musgrave 18	Danny Rollins
Toyota	HT Motorsports	59	Stacy Compton 1	Danny Rollins
Toyota	HT Motorsports	59	Joey Logano 1	Danny Rollins
Toyota	HT Motorsports	59	Terry Cook 5	Danny Rollins
Toyota	Red Horse Racing	11	David Starr	Jamie Jones
Toyota	Wyler Racing	60	Terry Cook 20	George Church 4 John Quinn 21
Toyota	Wyler Racing	60	Jack Sprague 5	George Church 4 John Quinn 21
Chevrolet Toyota	Billy Ballew Motorsports	15	Marc Mitchell (R) 13	Doug George
Chevrolet Toyota	Billy Ballew Motorsports	15	Denny Hamlin 2	Doug George
Chevrolet Toyota	Billy Ballew Motorsports	15	Shane Sieg 1	Doug George
Chevrolet Toyota	Billy Ballew Motorsports	15	David Stremme 2	Doug George
Chevrolet Toyota	Billy Ballew Motorsports	15	Jason White 2	Doug George
Chevrolet Toyota	Billy Ballew Motorsports	15	John Andretti 2	Doug George
Chevrolet Toyota	Billy Ballew Motorsports	15	Ryan Lawler 1	Doug George
Chevrolet Toyota	Billy Ballew Motorsports	15	Kenny Wallace 1	Doug George
Chevrolet Toyota	Billy Ballew Motorsports	15	James Buescher 1	Doug George
Chevrolet Toyota	SS-Green Light Racing	07	Shane Sieg 2	Bobby Dotter 12; Mike Davis 5 Doug Howe 2 Butch Miller 4 Mike Abner 2
Chevrolet Toyota	SS-Green Light Racing	07	Mike Bliss 1	Bobby Dotter 12; Mike Davis 5 Doug Howe 2 Butch Miller 4 Mike Abner 2
Chevrolet Toyota	SS-Green Light Racing	07	Ryan Lawler 6	Bobby Dotter 12; Mike Davis 5 Doug Howe 2 Butch Miller 4 Mike Abner 2
Chevrolet Toyota	SS-Green Light Racing	07	John Mickel 1	Bobby Dotter 12; Mike Davis 5 Doug Howe 2 Butch Miller 4 Mike Abner 2
Chevrolet Toyota	SS-Green Light Racing	07	Sean Murphy 6	Bobby Dotter 12; Mike Davis 5 Doug Howe 2 Butch Miller 4 Mike Abner 2
Chevrolet Toyota	SS-Green Light Racing	07	J. C. Stout 1	Bobby Dotter 12; Mike Davis 5 Doug Howe 2 Butch Miller 4 Mike Abner 2
Chevrolet Toyota	SS-Green Light Racing	07	Brandon Knupp 1	Bobby Dotter 12; Mike Davis 5 Doug Howe 2 Butch Miller 4 Mike Abner 2
Chevrolet Toyota	SS-Green Light Racing	07	Chris Jones 1	Bobby Dotter 12; Mike Davis 5 Doug Howe 2 Butch Miller 4 Mike Abner 2
Chevrolet Toyota	SS-Green Light Racing	07	Butch Miller 2	Bobby Dotter 12; Mike Davis 5 Doug Howe 2 Butch Miller 4 Mike Abner 2
Chevrolet Toyota	SS-Green Light Racing	07	Johnny Sauter 1	Bobby Dotter 12; Mike Davis 5 Doug Howe 2 Butch Miller 4 Mike Abner 2
Chevrolet Toyota	SS-Green Light Racing	07	Max Papis 2	Bobby Dotter 12; Mike Davis 5 Doug Howe 2 Butch Miller 4 Mike Abner 2
Chevrolet Toyota	SS-Green Light Racing	07	Johnny Chapman 1	Bobby Dotter 12; Mike Davis 5 Doug Howe 2 Butch Miller 4 Mike Abner 2
Chevrolet Toyota	Xpress Motorsports	16	Brian Scott (R)	Dave Fuge 17; Dave McCarty 1 Jeff Hensley 7

=== Part-time teams ===
Manufacturer	Team	No.	Driver(s)	Crew chief	Rounds
Chevrolet	Black Bull Racing	53	Justin Hobgood	Robert Bentley	2
Chevrolet	Brad Keselowski Racing	19	Robb Brent	Wayne Setterington Jr.	3
Chevrolet	Brad Keselowski Racing	19	Brad Keselowski	Wayne Setterington Jr.	1
Chevrolet	DGM Racing	12	Mario Gosselin	Germain Gosselin 4 William Davis 2	6
Chevrolet	DGM Racing	12	Scotty Crockett	Mario Gosselin	2
Chevrolet	DGM Racing	12	J. R. Fitzpatrick	Mario Gosselin	1
Chevrolet	Fast Track Racing Enterprises	48	Bryan Silas	Jeff McClure	2
Chevrolet	Fast Track Racing Enterprises	48	Hermie Sadler	Jeff McClure	1
Chevrolet	FDNY Racing	28	Wayne Edwards	Dick Rahilly	4
Chevrolet	Key Motorsports	44	Morgan Shepherd	Tommy Morgan	1
Chevrolet	Lafferty Motorsports	89	Ryan Seaman	Chris Lafferty	2
Chevrolet	Lafferty Motorsports	89	Nick Tucker	Chris Lafferty	1
Chevrolet	Lafferty Motorsports	89	Richard Johns	Chris Lafferty	2
Chevrolet	Lafferty Motorsports	89	Russ Dugger	Chris Lafferty	2
Chevrolet	Lafferty Motorsports	89	Mike Harmon	Chris Lafferty	2
Chevrolet	LCS Motorsports	87	Chris Jones	Mark Parks	2
Chevrolet	Morgan-Dollar Motorsports	47	A. J. Allmendinger	Kurt Binkley	1
Chevrolet	Morgan-Dollar Motorsports	47	Timothy Peters	Danny Gill	1
Chevrolet	Norm Benning Racing	57	Norm Benning	Stan Hover	8
Chevrolet	Reary Racing	54	Brian Sockwell	Steven Barfield 1 Jerry Reary 1	2
Chevrolet	Reary Racing	54	Bradley Riethmeyer	Jerry Markle	1
Chevrolet	SS-Green Light Racing	0	Butch Miller	Jim Schneider; Mike Davis	7
Chevrolet	SS-Green Light Racing	0	Wayne Edwards	Jim Schneider; Mike Davis	3
Chevrolet	SS-Green Light Racing	0	Chris Jones	Jim Schneider; Mike Davis	4
Chevrolet	SS-Green Light Racing	0	Johnny Chapman	Jim Schneider; Mike Davis	2
Chevrolet	SS-Green Light Racing	0	Mike Olsen	Jim Schneider; Mike Davis	1
Chevrolet	SS-Green Light Racing	0	Norm Benning	Jim Schneider; Mike Davis	1
Chevrolet	SS-Green Light Racing	0	Kevin Lepage	Jim Schneider; Mike Davis	1
Chevrolet	Stellar-Quest Racing Team	91	J. C. Stout	Steve Mollnow 2 Don Roberts 2	4
Chevrolet	Tatman Motorsports	37	Gary St. Amant	???	1
Chevrolet	TRG Motorsports	71	Mike Bliss	Jason Miller	1
Chevrolet	TRG Motorsports	71	Donny Lia (R)	Jason Miller	15
Chevrolet	TRG Motorsports	71	Andy Lally	Jason Miller	1
Chevrolet	TRG Motorsports	71	Ben Stancill	Jason Miller	1
Chevrolet	TRG Motorsports	71	J. R. Fitzpatrick	Jason Miller	2
Dodge	Bobby Hamilton Racing-Virginia	04	Patrick Carpentier	Mike Shiplett	1
Dodge	Bobby Hamilton Racing-Virginia	4	Stacy Compton	Bryant Frazier	16
Dodge	Bobby Hamilton Racing-Virginia	4	Sam Hornish Jr.	Chris Carrier	1
Dodge	Brevak Racing	31	Larry Foyt	Tony Mitchell	1
Dodge	CHS Motorsports	41	Tayler Malsam	Tom Sokoloski	2
Dodge	CHS Motorsports	41	Ryan Mathews	Tom Sokoloski	1
Dodge	Derrike Cope, Inc.	73	Michelle Theriault	Rick Markle 6 ??? 1	1
Dodge	Derrike Cope, Inc.	73	Nick Tucker	Rick Markle 6 ??? 1	4
Dodge	Derrike Cope, Inc.	73	Rick Markle	Rick Markle 6 ??? 1	1
Dodge	Derrike Cope, Inc.	73	Larry Gunselman	Rick Markle 6 ??? 1	1
Dodge	Derrike Cope, Inc.	73	Robert Bruce	Rick Markle 6 ??? 1	1
Dodge	Derrike Cope, Inc.	74	Jennifer Jo Cobb	Del Markle 8 Rick Markle 1	2
Dodge	Derrike Cope, Inc.	74	Derrike Cope	Del Markle 8 Rick Markle 1	2
Dodge	Derrike Cope, Inc.	74	Larry Gunselman	Del Markle 8 Rick Markle 1	2
Dodge	Derrike Cope, Inc.	74	Nick Tucker	Del Markle 8 Rick Markle 1	3
Dodge	Thompson Motorsports	61	Brett Thompson	Lonnie Rush	1
Dodge	Windward Racing Enterprises	29	Scott Lynch	Larry Pryor	2
Ford	Brent Raymer Racing	85	Brent Raymer	Pete Raymer 4 Tony Furr 1	5
Ford	Charles Buchanan Racing	50	Craig Wood	Tony Oscar	2
Ford	Cowen Racing	42	Tim Cowen	Stan Hover	3
Ford	East Coast Motorsports	66	Benny Gordon	Dan Glauz	1
Ford	JTG Racing	20	Scott Lagasse Jr.	Gary Cogswell 5 Greg Conner 3	8
Ford	MB Motorsports	36	J. C. Stout	???	3
Ford	Ray Hackett Racing	76	Ryan Hackett	Bryant Frazier	1
Toyota	Bill Davis Racing	24	Tayler Malsam	Gene Nead	1
Toyota	Germain Racing	03	Chrissy Wallace	Mike Abner	4
Toyota	Germain Racing	03	Dustin Skinner	Mike Abner	1
Toyota	Ken Schrader Racing	52	Ken Schrader	Donnie Richeson	3
Chevrolet Ford	MB Motorsports	63	P. J. Jones	Mike Mittler	2
Chevrolet Ford	MB Motorsports	63	Jack Smith	Mike Mittler	4
Chevrolet Ford	MB Motorsports	63	Justin Allgaier	Mike Mittler	1
Dodge Toyota	Premier Racing	17	Timothy Peters	Chad Kendrick	7

== Schedule ==
No	Race title	Track	Location	Date
1	Chevy Silverado 250	Daytona International Speedway	Daytona Beach, Florida	February 15
2	San Bernardino County 200	Auto Club Speedway	Fontana, California	February 23
3	American Commercial Lines 200	Atlanta Motor Speedway	Hampton, Georgia	March 7
4	Kroger 250	Martinsville Speedway	Ridgeway, Virginia	March 29
5	O'Reilly Auto Parts 250	Kansas Speedway	Kansas City, Kansas	April 26
6	NC Education Lottery 200	Lowe's Motor Speedway	Concord, North Carolina	May 16
7	Ohio 250	Mansfield Motorsports Park	Mansfield, Ohio	May 24
8	AAA Insurance 200	Dover International Speedway	Dover, Delaware	May 30
9	Sam's Town 400	Texas Motor Speedway	Fort Worth, Texas	June 6
10	Cool City Customs 200	Michigan International Speedway	Brooklyn, Michigan	June 14
11	Camping World RV Sales 200	Milwaukee Mile	West Allis, Wisconsin	June 20
12	O'Reilly 200	Memphis Motorsports Park	Millington, Tennessee	June 28
13	Built Ford Tough 225	Kentucky Speedway	Sparta, Kentucky	July 19
14	Power Stroke Diesel 200	O'Reilly Raceway Park	Brownsburg, Indiana	July 25
15	Toyota Tundra 200	Nashville Superspeedway	Lebanon, Tennessee	August 9
16	O'Reilly 200	Bristol Motor Speedway	Bristol, Tennessee	August 20
17	Camping World 200	Gateway International Raceway	Madison, Illinois	September 6
18	Camping World RV Rental 200	New Hampshire Motor Speedway	Loudon, New Hampshire	September 13
19	Qwik Liner Las Vegas 350	Las Vegas Motor Speedway	Las Vegas, Nevada	September 20
20	Mountain Dew 250	Talladega Superspeedway	Lincoln, Alabama	October 4
21	Kroger 200	Martinsville Speedway	Ridgeway, Virginia	October 18
22	E-Z-GO 200	Atlanta Motor Speedway	Henry County, Georgia	October 25
23	Chevy Silverado 350K	Texas Motor Speedway	Fort Worth, Texas	October 31
24	Lucas Oil 150	Phoenix International Raceway	Avondale, Arizona	November 7
25	Ford 200	Homestead–Miami Speedway	Homestead, Florida	November 14

== Races ==
=== Chevy Silverado HD 250 ===
The Chevy Silverado HD 250 was held February 15 at Daytona International Speedway. Erik Darnell won the pole. Anticipating another three wide finish such as the ones in 2003 and 2007, Darnell hoped to squash those hopes, and nearly did so by dominating the early portions of the race. During the early stages, multiple wrecks came about, including "The Big One" on lap 20, which was started when Brendan Gaughan made contact with an extremely tight Mike Skinner, forcing him up the racetrack and into the path of Matt Crafton, who also collected Ted Musgrave, Jon Wood, Chad Chaffin, and most notably P. J. Jones whose No. 63 truck caught fire trying to avoid the wreck, forcing a red flag. Only three laps later did the next wreck strike, with Joey Clanton getting loose and spinning, collecting outside polesitter Terry Cook, Mike Bliss, and ROTY contenders Colin Braun and Justin Marks. Darnell had the race in hand until green flag pitstops began at lap 84. Todd Bodine grabbed the lead from the dominant Darnell, who thought he had a loose wheel. While slowing to enter pit road, Marks was unaware that Darnell was pitting and the two made contact, ending Darnell's night. After the pit stop, Bodine would not look back, holding off a hard charging Kyle Busch and Johnny Benson for his first ever win at Daytona.

Top ten results:

Pos.	No.	Driver	Make	Team
1	30	Todd Bodine	Toyota	Germain Racing
2	51	Kyle Busch	Toyota	Billy Ballew Motorsports
3	23	Johnny Benson	Toyota	Bill Davis Racing
4	11	David Starr	Toyota	Red Horse Racing
5	14	Rick Crawford	Ford	Circle Bar Racing
6	4	Stacy Compton	Dodge	Bobby Hamilton Racing-Virginia
7	8	Chad McCumbee	Chevrolet	MRD Motorsports
8	9	Justin Marks (R)	Toyota	Germain Racing
9	16	Brian Scott (R)	Chevrolet	Xpress Motorsports
10	18	Dennis Setzer	Dodge	Bobby Hamilton Racing-Virginia

Did not qualify: Brian Sockwell (#54).

NOTE: Todd Bodine suffered a 25-point penalty when an illegal part was found on his truck during pre-qualifying inspection.

=== San Bernardino County 200 ===
The San Bernardino County 200 was held February 23 at the newly renamed Auto Club Speedway. As all of Friday's activities were cancelled due to rain, Truck qualifying and the race were both cancelled, with the race being pushed back to Saturday morning. Based on the 2007 owners points, defending champion Ron Hornaday Jr. was on pole. However, the race would mostly be dominated by Kyle Busch, coming out of a frustrating Speedweeks. Busch would dominate, leading the first 51 laps. However, Daytona winner Todd Bodine ran down Busch and passed him on the backstretch just after the halfway point. After the final round of green flag pit stops, Busch regained the lead by 3.5 seconds over Bodine and never looked back, cruising to his first Truck Series win of the season.

Top ten results:

Pos.	No.	Driver	Make	Team
1	51	Kyle Busch	Toyota	Billy Ballew Motorsports
2	30	Todd Bodine	Toyota	Germain Racing
3	23	Johnny Benson	Toyota	Bill Davis Racing
4	60	Terry Cook	Toyota	Wyler Racing
5	33	Ron Hornaday Jr.	Chevrolet	Kevin Harvick, Inc.
6	59	Ted Musgrave	Toyota	HT Motorsports
7	09	Travis Kvapil	Ford	Roush Fenway Racing
8	5	Mike Skinner	Toyota	Bill Davis Racing
9	16	Brian Scott (R)	Chevrolet	Xpress Motorsports
10	22	Phillip McGilton (R)	Toyota	Bill Davis Racing

Did not qualify: None, only 35 entries.

=== American Commercial Lines 200 ===
The American Commercial Lines 200 was held on March 7 at Atlanta Motor Speedway. Defending series champion Ron Hornaday Jr. won the pole. Hornaday would also dominate the race on long runs, leading for 81 laps. However, the critical moment of the race was on lap 112 when Kyle Busch's crew chief, Richie Wauters brought his driver into the pits after a ten-minute rain delay on lap 111. The stop forced leader Hornaday to pit a lap later. Busch took the lead from Hornaday within 10 laps to go, and held of Hornaday over a four lap sprint to the finish to take his second consecutive victory.

Top ten results:

Pos.	No.	Driver	Make	Team
1	51	Kyle Busch	Toyota	Billy Ballew Motorsports
2	33	Ron Hornaday Jr.	Chevrolet	Kevin Harvick, Inc.
3	5	Mike Skinner	Toyota	Bill Davis Racing
4	88	Matt Crafton	Chevrolet	ThorSport Racing
5	8	Chad McCumbee	Chevrolet	MRD Motorsports
6	2	Jack Sprague	Chevrolet	Kevin Harvick, Inc.
7	59	Ted Musgrave	Toyota	HT Motorsports
8	60	Terry Cook	Toyota	Wyler Racing
9	30	Todd Bodine	Toyota	Germain Racing
10	21	Jon Wood	Ford	Wood Brothers Racing

Did not qualify: None, only 32 entries.

=== Kroger 250 ===
The Kroger 250 was held March 29 at Martinsville Speedway. Jack Sprague won the track record breaking pole. The race would instead be dominated by "Short Track Slayer" Dennis Setzer, whose team, Bobby Hamilton Racing-Virginia, had recently moved to the Martinsville area to be more competitive. This competitiveness showed when Setzer took the lead on lap 128 when debutant Brent Raymer spun in front of leader Kyle Busch. Setzer would lead the rest of the way thanks to nine more cautions. Although the race went on for an extra three laps, Setzer would hang on for his first win since he won Mansfield (also on fuel mileage) with the defunct Spears Motorsports. However, behind Setzer it was complete chaos. While Setzer was rounding turn 4 to take the win, Busch, in a desperate attempt to take second, Busch attempted to drive underneath Johnny Benson However, Busch's left side hit the apron, sending both Benson Jr. and Busch spinning to 25th and 26th-place finishes. The win was emotional for the whole team as it was their first win since Bobby Hamilton won at Mansfield in 2005.

Position	No.	Driver	Make	Team
1	18	Dennis Setzer	Dodge	Bobby Hamilton Racing-Virginia
2	88	Matt Crafton	Chevrolet	ThorSport Racing
3	14	Rick Crawford	Ford	Circle Bar Racing
4	52	Ken Schrader	Toyota	Ken Schrader Racing
5	99	Erik Darnell	Ford	Roush Fenway Racing
6	11	David Starr	Toyota	Red Horse Racing
7	09	Travis Kvapil	Ford	Roush Fenway Racing
8	33	Ron Hornaday Jr.	Chevrolet	Kevin Harvick, Inc.
9	71	Donny Lia (R)	Chevrolet	The Racer's Group
10	46	Scott Speed (R)	Chevrolet	Morgan-Dollar Motorsports

Did not qualify: None, only 36 entries.

- This was Setzer's last career victory, and the last victory for Bobby Hamilton Racing.

=== O'Reilly Auto Parts 250 ===
The O'Reilly Auto Parts 250 was held on April 26 at Kansas Speedway. Ron Hornaday Jr. started from pole. For the first time this season, points leader Kyle Busch was absent in this race, due to a conflict between the finish of the Aaron's 312 and the start of the Truck race. With a new truck and the guidance of crew chief Rick Ren, Hornaday dominated the race, leading 136 of 167 laps en route to his first win of the season. Making the win even sweeter was the fact that it was a KHI 1–2 finish with new teammate Jack Sprague close behind. Rookie Colin Braun rounded out the "podium" although controversially as he was involved in incidents with veterans Sprague and Matt Crafton.

Pos	No.	Driver	Manu.	Team
1	33	Ron Hornaday Jr.	Chevrolet	Kevin Harvick, Inc.
2	2	Jack Sprague	Chevrolet	Kevin Harvick, Inc.
3	6	Colin Braun	Ford	Roush Fenway Racing
4	23	Johnny Benson	Toyota	Bill Davis Racing
5	5	Mike Skinner	Toyota	Bill Davis Racing
6	10	Brendan Gaughan	Ford	Circle Bar Racing
7	8	Chad McCumbee	Chevrolet	MRD Motorsports
8	22	Scott Speed	Toyota	Bill Davis Racing
9	14	Rick Crawford	Ford	Circle Bar Racing
10	59	Ted Musgrave	Toyota	HT Motorsports

Did not qualify: None, only 36 entries.

=== North Carolina Education Lottery 200 ===
The North Carolina Education Lottery 200 was held on May 16 at Lowe's Motor Speedway. Kyle Busch won the pole. Busch would dominate for 86 laps at the site of his first ever truck series win. On lap 104, Busch collided with defending champion Ron Hornaday Jr., sending both trucks into the turn 3 wall and out of contention to win. Late in the race with seven laps to go, Erik Darnell was leading the field to the green on a restart when his tires spun, taking him out of contention. As Johnny Benson moved by Darnell for the top spot, NASCAR penalized Benson Jr. for jumping the start. In the lead during the next restart would be Matt Crafton, followed by a resurgent Hornaday and Todd Bodine. On the subsequent restart, Bodine sent Hornaday spinning into turn one, handing second and third to Chad McCumbee and Brendan Gaughan, respectively. Despite a valiant run by McCumbee on the backstretch, Crafton would take home an upset victory, his first in 178 races and the first for ThorSport Racing in a decade (Terry Cook's first win at Flemington Speedway).

Pos	No.	Driver	Manu.	Team
1	88	Matt Crafton	Chevrolet	ThorSport Racing
2	8	Chad McCumbee	Chevrolet	MRD Motorsports
3	10	Brendan Gaughan	Ford	Circle Bar Racing
4	99	Erik Darnell	Ford	Roush Fenway Racing
5	14	Rick Crawford	Ford	Circle Bar Racing
6	60	Terry Cook	Toyota	Wyler Racing
7	18	Dennis Setzer	Dodge	Bobby Hamilton Racing-Virginia
8	51	Kyle Busch	Toyota	Billy Ballew Motorsports
9	46	Landon Cassill	Chevrolet	Morgan-Dollar Motorsports
10	5	Mike Skinner	Toyota	Bill Davis Racing

Did not qualify: Nick Tucker (#73), Wayne Edwards (#28).

=== Ohio 250 ===
The Ohio 250 was held on May 24 at Mansfield Motorsports Park. Johnny Benson won the pole. As with most Mansfield races, the action was expected to be tight and dramatic, with fuel mileage playing out in the latter half. With the downsizing in fuel cells to 18 gallons, it was deemed mathematically impossible for any driver in the field to repeat Dennis Setzer's no stop victory the previous year. With a record 15 cautions, the best of the afternoon was saved for the last part of the race. David Starr and his Red Horse Racing team had dominated the day, leading 170 laps in total. However, in the final laps, Starr's seemingly inevitable victory would be done in. Rookie Donny Lia, who had started 28th, had worked his way through the field and to the rear tailgate of Starr's truck. On the final lap, Lia daringly pulled the bump and run on Starr exiting turn 2. The two drivers along with Todd Bodine made it three wide on the backstretch. Lia would gain the advantage heading into turn three and the 2007 Whelen Modified Tour champion would hang on to take the first ever win for both him and his upstart team, legendary road racing team TRG Motorsports, as well as the second consecutive first time winner for the 2008 season.

Pos	No.	Driver	Manu.	Team
1	71	Donny Lia (R)	Chevrolet	TRG Motorsports
2	11	David Starr	Toyota	Red Horse Racing
3	30	Todd Bodine	Toyota	Germain Racing
4	60	Terry Cook	Toyota	Wyler Racing
5	5	Mike Skinner	Toyota	Bill Davis Racing
6	13	Shelby Howard (R)	Chevrolet	ThorSport Racing
7	2	Jack Sprague	Chevrolet	Kevin Harvick, Inc.
8	23	Johnny Benson	Toyota	Bill Davis Racing
9	07	Sean Murphy	Chevrolet	SS-Green Light Racing
10	4	Stacy Compton	Dodge	Bobby Hamilton Racing-Virginia

Did not qualify: None, only 36 entries.

- This was the first and only career NASCAR victory for both Lia, and for TRG Motorsports.
- This was the last NASCAR race to be held at Mansfield Motorsports Park.

=== AAA Insurance 200 ===
The AAA Insurance 200 was held on May 30 at Dover International Speedway. Mike Skinner won the pole. Skinner would not lead for long as the dominant Kyle Busch would take the top spot and stay there for the first 96 laps. However, heavy smoke was billowing from Busch's No. 51 truck, forcing him to the garage with transmission troubles and knocking him out of contention. Taking over the top spot would be Todd Bodine, who would stay out on a lap 133 restart with Shane Sieg. Making only his sixth start in NASCAR competition and running on two tires, ex-Formula One driver Scott Speed lived up to his name and opened up a four-second lead on Ron Hornaday Jr. Although Speed's lead would be cut due to Bodine crashing on lap 170, he would hold off veterans Hornaday and Jack Sprague to become the third consecutive first time winner for the 2008 season. The other time this happened was in 1998, with Andy Houston (Loudon), Terry Cook (Flemington), and Jimmy Hensley (Music City)

Pos.	No.	Driver	Make	Team
1	22	Scott Speed (R)	Toyota	Bill Davis Racing
2	2	Jack Sprague	Chevrolet	Kevin Harvick, Inc.
3	33	Ron Hornaday Jr.	Chevrolet	Kevin Harvick, Inc.
4	09	Travis Kvapil	Ford	Roush Fenway Racing
5	88	Matt Crafton	Chevrolet	ThorSport Racing
6	11	David Starr	Toyota	Red Horse Racing
7	5	Mike Skinner	Toyota	Bill Davis Racing
8	6	Colin Braun (R)	Ford	Roush Fenway Racing
9	14	Rick Crawford	Ford	Circle Bar Racing
10	23	Johnny Benson	Toyota	Bill Davis Racing

Did not qualify: None, only 36 entries.

=== Sam's Town 400 ===
The Sam's Town 400 was held June 6 at Texas Motor Speedway. Justin Marks won his first career pole. As the series was on a streak of three consecutive first time winners, many looked towards Chad McCumbee, who had nearly won the fall Texas race in '07, polesitter Marks, and Plano native Colin Braun. It was not just the young drivers seeking the win at Texas, but veterans as well, such as defending champion Ron Hornaday Jr., Mike Skinner, who started on the front row at Texas for his eighth consecutive start had never won, and Brendan Gaughan, who literally turned the track into his personal playground in both '02 and '03. Although Marks led early he would fall back to 8th before the first round of pit stops. As usual, Cup series points leader Kyle Busch would also be a factor in the race. Although Busch started in the back (Shane Sieg qualified the No. 51 truck while Busch was in Pocono, Pennsylvania and he also missed the drivers meeting.) he was able to work his way into the top 10 within 60 laps. However, Busch's fortunes would be undone as he had not had the proper seat time to adjust the truck. All the while, "Restart Master" Hornaday would lead a record 140 laps (breaking Greg Biffle's record of 119) and hold off Busch on a green-white-checkered to take his first win at Texas.

Pos	No.	Driver	Manu.	Team
1	33	Ron Hornaday Jr.	Chevrolet	Kevin Harvick, Inc.
2	51	Kyle Busch	Toyota	Billy Ballew Motorsports
3	23	Johnny Benson	Toyota	Bill Davis Racing
4	2	Jack Sprague	Chevrolet	Kevin Harvick, Inc.
5	30	Todd Bodine	Toyota	Germain Racing
6	8	Chad McCumbee	Chevrolet	MRD Motorsports
7	88	Matt Crafton	Chevrolet	ThorSport Racing
8	09	Bobby East	Ford	Roush Fenway Racing
9	5	Mike Skinner	Toyota	Bill Davis Racing
10	21	Jon Wood	Ford	Wood Brothers Racing

Did not qualify: None, only 35 entries.

=== Cool City Customs 200 ===
The Cool City Customs 200 was held on June 14 at Michigan International Speedway. Mike Skinner won the pole. Skinner would only lead the opening lap before falling back and eventually finishing 8th. From then on, the race would be dominated by Todd Bodine who would lead for 39 laps. However, the final pit stop, it would be Erik Darnell taking the top spot, holding it for the final 25 circuits. However, a late caution came out with three to go, setting up a fast finish. On the last lap, Johnny Benson took the lead from Darnell in turn 3 and the two were side by side on the frontstretch. In the final 50 yards it appeared as though Benson Jr. would win by a nose, but Darnell surged at the last minute with a side draft and beat Benson to the line by less than 0.005 seconds, the second closest finish in Truck Series history. During the final lap, points leader Ron Hornaday Jr. was running fourth after starting in the back due to an engine change. In turn 2, Hornaday was spun by Kyle Busch into the infield, but no caution came out, handing Hornaday a 23rd-place finish and the loss of the points lead. After the race Hornaday and team owner Kevin Harvick confronted Busch on pit road.

Pos	No.	Driver	Manu.	Team
1	99	Erik Darnell	Ford	Roush Fenway Racing
2	23	Johnny Benson	Toyota	Bill Davis Racing
3	22	Scott Speed (R)	Toyota	Bill Davis Racing
4	23	Todd Bodine	Toyota	Germain Racing
5	10	Brendan Gaughan	Ford	Circle Bar Racing
6	6	Colin Braun (R)	Ford	Roush Fenway Racing
7	51	Kyle Busch	Toyota	Billy Ballew Motorsports
8	5	Mike Skinner	Toyota	Bill Davis Racing
9	8	Chad McCumbee	Chevrolet	MRD Motorsports
10	60	Terry Cook	Toyota	Wyler Racing

Did not qualify: None, only 34 entries.

=== Camping World RV Sales 200 ===
The Camping World RV Sales 200 was held June 20 at Milwaukee Mile. Johnny Benson took the pole and won the race.

Top ten results:

Pos	No.	Driver	Manu.	Team
1	23	Johnny Benson	Toyota	Bill Davis Racing
2	88	Matt Crafton	Chevrolet	ThorSport Racing
3	46	Landon Cassill	Chevrolet	Morgan-Dollar Motorsports
4	99	Erik Darnell	Ford	Roush Fenway Racing
5	30	Todd Bodine	Toyota	Germain Racing
6	22	Michael Annett	Toyota	Bill Davis Racing
7	33	Ron Hornaday Jr.	Chevrolet	Kevin Harvick, Inc.
8	14	Rick Crawford	Ford	Circle Bar Racing
9	60	Terry Cook	Toyota	Wyler Racing
10	5	Mike Skinner	Toyota	Bill Davis Racing

Did not qualify: None, only 36 entries.

=== O'Reilly 200 ===
The O'Reilly 200 was held June 28 at Memphis Motorsports Park. Johnny Benson took the pole but Ron Hornaday Jr. won the race.

Top ten results:

Pos.	No.	Driver	Make	Team
1	33	Ron Hornaday Jr.	Chevrolet	Kevin Harvick, Inc.
2	99	Erik Darnell	Ford	Roush Fenway Racing
3	88	Matt Crafton	Chevrolet	ThorSport Racing
4	14	Rick Crawford	Ford	Circle Bar Racing
5	11	David Starr	Toyota	Red Horse Racing
6	2	Jack Sprague	Chevrolet	Kevin Harvick, Inc.
7	5	Mike Skinner	Toyota	Bill Davis Racing
8	09	Bobby East	Ford	Roush Fenway Racing
9	51	Shane Sieg	Toyota	Billy Ballew Motorsports
10	4	Stacy Compton	Dodge	Bobby Hamilton Racing-Virginia

Did not qualify: None, only 35 entries.

=== Built Ford Tough 225 ===
The Built Ford Tough 225 was held July 19 at Kentucky Speedway. Mike Skinner took the pole but Johnny Benson won the race.

Top ten results:

Pos.	No.	Driver	Make	Team
1	23	Johnny Benson	Toyota	Bill Davis Racing
2	22	Michael Annett	Toyota	Bill Davis Racing
3	88	Matt Crafton	Chevrolet	ThorSport Racing
4	18	Dennis Setzer	Dodge	Bobby Hamilton Racing-Virginia
5	11	David Starr	Toyota	Red Horse Racing
6	51	Kyle Busch	Toyota	Billy Ballew Motorsports
7	5	Mike Skinner	Toyota	Bill Davis Racing
8	60	Terry Cook	Toyota	Wyler Racing
9	15	Marc Mitchell (R)	Toyota	Billy Ballew Motorsports
10	33	Ron Hornaday Jr.	Chevrolet	Kevin Harvick, Inc.

Did not qualify: Wayne Edwards (#28).

=== Power Stroke Diesel 200 ===
The Power Stroke Diesel 200 was held July 25 at O'Reilly Raceway Park. Bobby East took his first Craftsman Truck Series pole but Johnny Benson won the race.

Top ten results:

Pos.	No.	Driver	Make	Team
1	23	Johnny Benson	Toyota	Bill Davis Racing
2	33	Ron Hornaday Jr.	Chevrolet	Kevin Harvick, Inc.
3	99	Erik Darnell	Ford	Roush Fenway Racing
4	88	Matt Crafton	Chevrolet	ThorSport Racing
5	13	Shelby Howard (R)	Chevrolet	ThorSport Racing
6	10	Brendan Gaughan	Ford	Circle Bar Racing
7	7	T. J. Bell	Chevrolet	The Racer's Group
8	51	Kyle Busch	Toyota	Billy Ballew Motorsports
9	71	Donny Lia (R)	Chevrolet	The Racer's Group
10	5	Mike Skinner	Toyota	Bill Davis Racing

Did not qualify: None, only 34 entries.

=== Toyota Tundra 200 ===
The Toyota Tundra 200 was held August 9 at Nashville Superspeedway. Todd Bodine took the pole but Johnny Benson won the race.

Top ten results:

Pos.	No.	Driver	Make	Team
1	23	Johnny Benson	Toyota	Bill Davis Racing
2	99	Erik Darnell	Ford	Roush Fenway Racing
3	30	Todd Bodine	Toyota	Germain Racing
4	2	Jack Sprague	Chevrolet	Kevin Harvick, Inc.
5	33	Ron Hornaday Jr.	Chevrolet	Kevin Harvick, Inc.
6	6	Colin Braun (R)	Ford	Roush Fenway Racing
7	4	Stacy Compton	Dodge	Bobby Hamilton Racing-Virginia
8	59	Ted Musgrave	Toyota	HT Motorsports
9	11	David Starr	Toyota	Red Horse Racing
10	8	Chad McCumbee	Chevrolet	MRD Motorsports

Did not qualify: None, only 34 entries.

NOTE: Todd Bodine suffered a 25-point penalty for an illegal modification to his truck found in post race inspection.

=== O'Reilly 200 (Bristol) ===
The O'Reilly 200 was held on August 20 at Bristol Motor Speedway. Scott Speed won the pole and would fall back and eventually finished 3rd.

Top ten results:

Pos	No.	Driver	Manu.	Team
1	51	Kyle Busch	Toyota	Billy Ballew Motorsports
2	30	Todd Bodine	Toyota	Germain Racing
3	22	Scott Speed (R)	Toyota	Bill Davis Racing
4	23	Johnny Benson	Toyota	Bill Davis Racing
5	14	Rick Crawford	Ford	Circle Bar Racing
6	7	T. J. Bell	Chevrolet	The Racer's Group
7	5	Mike Skinner	Toyota	Bill Davis Racing
8	18	Dennis Setzer	Dodge	Bobby Hamilton Racing-Virginia
9	15	David Stremme	Toyota	Billy Ballew Motorsports
10	59	Ted Musgrave	Toyota	HT Motorsports

Did not qualify: Norm Benning (#57).

• Jimmie Johnson would make his lone career Truck Series start to date, driving the #81 Lowe's/Kobalt Tools Chevrolet Silverado for Randy Moss Motorsports. He would lead 28 laps and finish 34th after crashing on lap 102.

=== Camping World 200 ===
The Camping World 200 was held September 6 at Gateway International Raceway. Dennis Setzer took the pole but Ron Hornaday Jr. won the race.

Top ten results:

Pos.	No.	Driver	Make	Team
1	33	Ron Hornaday Jr.	Chevrolet	Kevin Harvick, Inc.
2	18	Dennis Setzer	Dodge	Bobby Hamilton Racing-Virginia
3	23	Johnny Benson	Toyota	Bill Davis Racing
4	30	Todd Bodine	Toyota	Germain Racing
5	2	Jack Sprague	Chevrolet	Kevin Harvick, Inc.
6	99	Erik Darnell	Ford	Roush Fenway Racing
7	5	Mike Skinner	Toyota	Bill Davis Racing
8	14	Rick Crawford	Ford	Circle Bar Racing
9	6	Colin Braun (R)	Ford	Roush Fenway Racing
10	59	Ted Musgrave	Toyota	HT Motorsports

Did not qualify: None, only 35 entries.

=== Camping World RV Rental 200 ===
The Camping World RV Rental 200 was held on September 13 at New Hampshire Motor Speedway. Ron Hornaday Jr. won the race and there was a large post race scuffle after the race between the crews of Todd Bodine and David Starr.

Top ten results:

Pos.	No.	Driver	Make	Team
1	33	Ron Hornaday Jr.	Chevrolet	Kevin Harvick, Inc.
2	23	Johnny Benson	Toyota	Bill Davis Racing
3	09	Travis Kvapil	Ford	Roush Fenway Racing
4	99	Erik Darnell	Ford	Roush Fenway Racing
5	14	Rick Crawford	Ford	Circle Bar Racing
6	51	Kyle Busch	Toyota	Billy Ballew Motorsports
7	11	David Starr	Toyota	Red Horse Racing
8	16	Brian Scott (R)	Chevrolet	Xpress Motorsports
9	2	Jack Sprague	Chevrolet	Kevin Harvick, Inc.
10	7	T. J. Bell	Chevrolet	The Racer's Group

Did not qualify: None, only 33 entries.

=== Qwik Liner Las Vegas 350 ===
The Qwik Liner Las Vegas 350 was held September 20 at Las Vegas Motor Speedway. Ron Hornaday Jr. won the pole. Hornaday would be passed by Mike Skinner after the opening lap. During a series of pit stops, points leader Johnny Benson decided to stay out, despite the fact his tires were old. He would lead for 26 laps before the right front tire went flat, sending Benson Jr. into the wall and ending his bid for the win. After pit stops following a caution by Dennis Setzer and Shane Sieg, Erik Darnell would take the lead stay there for 56 laps, leading the most. However, Mike Skinner chased down Darnell on the white flag lap and was side by side with him along the backstretch. Darnell side drafted Skinner to retake the lead coming out of turn 4 but Skinner hit Darnell's side, breaking the No. 99's momentum and taking Skinner to his first win of 2008.

Top ten results:

Pos.	No.	Driver	Make	Team
1	5	Mike Skinner	Toyota	Bill Davis Racing
2	99	Erik Darnell	Ford	Roush Fenway Racing
3	88	Matt Crafton	Chevrolet	ThorSport Racing
4	15	John Andretti	Toyota	Billy Ballew Motorsports
5	33	Ron Hornaday Jr.	Chevrolet	Kevin Harvick, Inc.
6	51	Kyle Busch	Toyota	Billy Ballew Motorsports
7	40	Jeff Green	Chevrolet	Key Motorsports
8	7	T. J. Bell	Chevrolet	The Racer's Group
9	30	Todd Bodine	Toyota	Germain Racing
10	81	Donny Lia (R)	Chevrolet	Randy Moss Motorsports

Did not qualify: None, only 31 entries.

=== Mountain Dew 250 ===
The Mountain Dew 250 was held on October 4 at Talladega Superspeedway. Erik Darnell won the pole. The points race had tightened with Johnny Benson only a single point ahead of defending champion Ron Hornaday Jr. Like Daytona, Darnell dominated the race, leading 48 laps with teammates Colin Braun and John Wes Townley close behind. Townley would later be spun unintentionally by defending race winner Todd Bodine while on pit road at lap 50. Alabama native Rick Crawford earned a speeding penalty during the series of pit stops, ending his chances at a home state victory. After another series of green flag pit stops, John Andretti, Braun, Kyle Busch, and Brian Scott took turns leading until 14 to go when Busch, Hornaday, and Bodine all pulled away. With 1 to go Braun was pushed into the lead by T. J. Bell, but was later passed by Busch on the backstretch. However, Bodine pulled the "bump and run" on Busch, loosening him and eventually passing him for the win, with new points leader Hornaday in tow.

Top ten results:

Pos.	No.	Driver	Make	Team
1	30	Todd Bodine	Toyota	Germain Racing
2	33	Ron Hornaday Jr.	Chevrolet	Kevin Harvick, Inc.
3	51	Kyle Busch	Toyota	Billy Ballew Motorsports
4	6	Colin Braun (R)	Ford	Roush Fenway Racing
5	9	Mike Wallace	Toyota	Germain Racing
6	81	Landon Cassill	Chevrolet	Randy Moss Motorsports
7	16	Brian Scott (R)	Toyota	Xpress Motorsports
8	7	T. J. Bell	Chevrolet	The Racer's Group
9	5	Mike Skinner	Toyota	Bill Davis Racing
10	8	Chad McCumbee	Chevrolet	MRD Motorsports

Did not qualify: None, only 33 entries.

=== Kroger 200 ===
The Kroger 200 was held October 18 at Martinsville Speedway. Ron Hornaday Jr. took the pole but Johnny Benson won the race.

Top ten results:

Pos.	No.	Driver	Make	Team
1	23	Johnny Benson	Toyota	Bill Davis Racing
2	18	Dennis Setzer	Dodge	Bobby Hamilton Racing-Virginia
3	14	Rick Crawford	Ford	Circle Bar Racing
4	51	Kyle Busch	Toyota	Billy Ballew Motorsports
5	30	Todd Bodine	Toyota	Germain Racing
6	7	T. J. Bell	Chevrolet	The Racer's Group
7	22	Scott Speed (R)	Toyota	Bill Davis Racing
8	88	Matt Crafton	Chevrolet	ThorSport Racing
9	4	Sam Hornish Jr.	Dodge	Bobby Hamilton Racing-Virginia
10	17	Timothy Peters	Dodge	Premier Racing

Did not qualify: Tayler Malsam (#41), Robert Bruce (#73), Russ Dugger (#89), Craig Wood (#50).

=== E-Z-GO 200 ===
The E-Z-GO 200 was held October 25 at Atlanta Motor Speedway. Ryan Newman won his first ever Craftsman Truck Series race in his first start.

Top ten results:

Pos.	No.	Driver	Make	Team
1	2	Ryan Newman	Chevrolet	Kevin Harvick, Inc.
2	33	Ron Hornaday Jr.	Chevrolet	Kevin Harvick, Inc.
3	15	Denny Hamlin	Toyota	Billy Ballew Motorsports
4	30	Todd Bodine	Toyota	Germain Racing
5	22	Scott Speed (R)	Toyota	Bill Davis Racing
6	99	Erik Darnell	Ford	Roush Fenway Racing
7	23	Johnny Benson	Toyota	Bill Davis Racing
8	51	Kyle Busch	Toyota	Billy Ballew Motorsports
9	7	T. J. Bell	Chevrolet	The Racer's Group
10	16	Brian Scott (R)	Toyota	Xpress Motorsports

Did not qualify: None, only 33 entries.

=== Chevy Silverado 350K ===
The Chevy Silverado 350K was held October 31 at Texas Motor Speedway in Fort Worth, Texas. Rick Crawford won the pole. The sparks flew early on lap 2 as Travis Kvapil, attempting a three wide pass, pushed rookie Cale Gale into the left side of Crawford's truck. Gale's resultant spin forced T. J. Bell to hit his brakes, but Todd Bodine couldn't avoid Bell and tapped him up the track while also turning Jon Wood into the wall. Gale's car steered from the wall and hit Bell's rear quarter panel, sending him into the fence. At lap 51, spring Texas winner Ron Hornaday Jr. passed Kyle Busch for the lead. While Hornaday was pitting on lap 56, Jack Smith spun on the backstretch, pinning Hornaday a lap down. 10 laps later Hornaday would be in 16th thanks to a caution. Hornaday would charge to the lead, passing Kvapil on lap 108 and holding off Busch to sweep at Texas and cut Johnny Benson's point lead down to only six points.

Top ten results:

Pos.	No.	Driver	Make	Team
1	33	Ron Hornaday Jr.	Chevrolet	Kevin Harvick, Inc.
2	51	Kyle Busch	Toyota	Billy Ballew Motorsports
3	23	Johnny Benson	Toyota	Bill Davis Racing
4	30	Todd Bodine	Toyota	Germain Racing
5	6	Colin Braun (R)	Ford	Roush Fenway Racing
6	59	Terry Cook	Toyota	HT Motorsports
7	09	Travis Kvapil	Ford	Roush Fenway Racing
8	5	Mike Skinner	Toyota	Bill Davis Racing
9	16	Brian Scott (R)	Toyota	Xpress Motorsports
9	7	Scott Speed (R)	Toyota	Bill Davis Racing

Did not qualify: None, only 34 entries.

=== Lucas Oil 150 (Phoenix) ===
The Lucas Oil 150 was held November 7 at Phoenix International Raceway. Ron Hornaday Jr. took the pole but Kevin Harvick won the race.

Top ten results:

Pos.	No.	Driver	Make	Team
1	2	Kevin Harvick	Chevrolet	Kevin Harvick, Inc.
2	51	Kyle Busch	Toyota	Billy Ballew Motorsports
3	30	Todd Bodine	Toyota	Germain Racing
4	16	Brian Scott (R)	Toyota	Xpress Motorsports
5	5	Mike Skinner	Toyota	Bill Davis Racing
6	19	Brad Keselowski	Chevrolet	Brad Keselowski Racing
7	99	Erik Darnell	Ford	Roush Fenway Racing
8	88	Matt Crafton	Chevrolet	ThorSport Racing
9	14	Rick Crawford	Ford	Circle Bar Racing
10	10	Brendan Gaughan	Ford	Circle Bar Racing

Did not qualify: None, only 35 entries.

=== Ford 200 ===
The Ford 200 was held November 14 at Homestead-Miami Speedway. Mike Skinner took the pole but Todd Bodine won the race.

Top ten results:

Pos.	No.	Driver	Make	Team
1	30	Todd Bodine	Toyota	Germain Racing
2	16	Brian Scott (R)	Toyota	Xpress Motorsports
3	2	Kevin Harvick	Chevrolet	Kevin Harvick, Inc.
3	51	Kyle Busch	Toyota	Billy Ballew Motorsports
5	18	Dennis Setzer	Dodge	Bobby Hamilton Racing-Virginia
6	09	Travis Kvapil	Ford	Roush Fenway Racing
7	23	Johnny Benson	Toyota	Bill Davis Racing
8	33	Ron Hornaday Jr.	Chevrolet	Kevin Harvick, Inc.
9	59	Terry Cook	Toyota	HT Motorsports
10	22	Scott Speed (R)	Toyota	Bill Davis Racing

Did not qualify: Mike Harmon (#89).

- Jack Sprague would make his last career NASCAR start in this race, finishing 20th for Wyler Racing.

== Full Drivers' Championship ==
(key) Bold – Pole position awarded by time. Italics – Pole position set by owner's points. * – Most laps led.

Pos	Driver	DAY	CAL	ATL	MAR	KAN	CLT	MFD	DOV	TEX	MCH	MIL	MEM	KEN	IRP	NSH	BRI	GTW	NHA	LVS	TAL	MAR	ATL	TEX	PHO	HOM	Points
1	Johnny Benson	3	3	30	25	4	11	**8**	10	3	2	**1***	**33**	1*	1	1	4	3	2	27	11	1	7	3	26	7	3725
2	Ron Hornaday Jr.	25	5	**2***	8	**1***	23	35	3	1*	23	7	1*	10	2*	5	24	1*	1*	**5**	2	**29***	2*	1	**25**	8	3718
3	Todd Bodine	1*	2	9	12	23	12	3	29	5	4*	5	14	27	22	**3***	2	4	19	9	1	5	4	4	3	1	3621
4	Erik Darnell	**21**	11	12	5	28	4	11	25	24	1	4	2	29	3	2	15	6	4	2*	**12***	19	6	18	7	11	3412
5	Matt Crafton	24	15	4	2	21	1	12	5	7	15	2	3	3	4	11	21	12	12	3	16	8	29	19	8	17	3392
6	Mike Skinner	29	8	3	29	5	10	5	**7**	9	**8**	10	7	**7**	10	17	7	7	15	1	9	12	26	8	5	**26**	3363
7	Rick Crawford	5	14	11	3	9	5	13	9	21	11	8	4	14	12	23	5	8	5	6	28	3	12	**11**	9	33	3315
8	Dennis Setzer	10	16	13	1*	25	7	34	18	11	16	11	12	4	26	18	8	**2**	16	16	13	2	19	13	15	5	3197
9	Jack Sprague	19	22	6	**24**	2	14	7	2	4	30	13	6	22	17	4	14	5	9	26	27	11	13	15	17	20	3125
10	Terry Cook	30	4	8	13	19	6	4	13	16	10	9	17	8	11	12	23	17	18	23	23	16	28	6	11	9	3072
11	Chad McCumbee	7	18	5	32	7	2	24	12	6	9	27	15	30	31	10	11	11	11	11	10	24	15	23	12	13	2999
12	David Starr	4	13	21	6	27	17	2*	6	27	26	23	5	5	16	9	29	28	7	22	19	33	14	12	13	22	2929
13	Colin Braun **(R)**	31	9	28	14	3	15	16	8	22	6	31	29	16	15	6	32	9	28	12	4	25	20	5	28	14	2856
14	Kyle Busch	2	1*	1	26		**8***		27*	2	7			6	8		1*		6		3	4	8	2*	2*	4*	2854
15	Brendan Gaughan	34	12	15	11	6	3	30	20	15	5	16	22	28	6	24	13	21	20	20	20	22	16	16	10	18	2840
16	Brian Scott **(R)**	9	23	17	30	14	35	25	32	13	25	32	13	32	29	14	19	14	8	14	7	14	10	9	4	2	2787
17	Shelby Howard	15	25	26	34	16	20	6	19	20	19	14	16	36	5	22	26	23	14	18	17	13	22	17	19	25	2636
18	Donny Lia **(R)**		26	20	9	12	34	1	17	19	12	22	26	20	9	16	12		29	10		28	17	14	16	16	2466
19	Jason White	22	30	24	27	15	26	29	30	29	28	17	25	18	18	28	18	30	21	17	29	17	18	25	20	23	2338
20	Ted Musgrave	28	6	7	15	10	22	17	11	28	24	19	20	13	20	8	10	10	17								2099
21	Scott Speed **(R)**			27	10	8	33	15	1	26	3						**3**			21	15	7	5	10	14	10	2058
22	T. J. Bell									31	20	29	18	25	7	19	6	29	10	8	8	6	8	32	27	12	1906
23	Justin Marks **(R)**	8	33	14	20	11	32	18	16	**14**	13	25	24	31	30	20	22	27		29							1781
24	Stacy Compton	6	21	19	35	20	28	10	23	30	21	24	10	12	23	7	31			28							1748
25	Jon Wood	27	32	10	28	26	19		15	10	14			11			16			13	22	30	21	31	23		1729
26	Chad Chaffin	36	28	25	22	17	21	19	21	25	27		23	23	13											28	1303
27	Marc Mitchell **(R)**	13	20	23		31	24	26		12	22	15	31	9	25			26									1295
28	Travis Kvapil		7	18	7		18		4										3				11	7		6	1276
29	Shane Sieg	23		31		18		21	14				9			25		13		19							950
30	Michael Annett									QL^{†}		6	11	2	21	33		24	24						18		910
31	Landon Cassill					13	9	20	24			3			14						6						892
32	Andy Lally **(R)**	11	29	22	36	29	16	14	22									20									870
33	Jeff Green															26	27	18		7	21	31	23	24			777
34	Bobby East					24				8	18		8		**19**			25		25							771
35	Ryan Lawler				17	32			28	18			21	17								27		22			763
36	Timothy Peters				19		25							19		15	30		23			10				15	743
37	Keven Wood							22				21	30		24	29		15	22							29	728
38	Scott Lagasse Jr.	26	19	29	23	30	27	33	26																		665
39	John Wes Townley							27				18		21		30	35				18				24		622
40	Sean Murphy							9				26			27		17			15	30						608
41	J. C. Stout						30		31	34	32			35				33	26					26			563
42	Chrissy Wallace				18							20		33				19					25			31	540
43	Butch Miller		35	32					36	32								35	31				32	27	35		524
44	Phillip McGilton **(R)**	12	10	16	16																						491
45	Kevin Harvick																					15			1	3	478
46	Norm Benning															DNQ	34		33	30	32		31	28	34	35	469
47	Mario Gosselin					34					29				28				27				24			24	403
48	Jack Smith					22		32										22						21			366
49	Brent Raymer				31							28		34									27			30	365
50	Mike Bliss	33	24									12													31		352
51	Ken Schrader				4		13										33										348
52	Willie Allen												19	15		27											306
53	John Andretti																			4	14						291
54	Denny Hamlin				21																	3					270
55	Wayne Edwards	17				36	DNQ						35	DNQ							24		33				267
56	David Stremme															13	9										262
57	Robb Brent															21		32		24							258
58	J. R. Fitzpatrick																					21			30	32	240
59	Chris Jones										34		32			32	20	34		34							231
60	Erin Crocker	18	27																								203
61	Tim Cowen				33			36					28														198
62	Nick Tucker						DNQ		35	33	31	33	34		32							35					192
63	Ryan Newman																						1				190
64	Scott Lynch	16	31																								185
65	Scotty Crockett							23					27														176
66	Justin Hobgood	20																			33						167
67	Bryan Silas																28				25						167
68	Paul Poulter											30							25								161
69	Max Papis																							29		27	158
70	Mike Wallace																				5						155
71	Tayler Malsam																36					DNQ				21	155
72	P. J. Jones	35								23																	152
73	Brad Keselowski																								6		150
74	Sam Hornish Jr.																					9					138
75	David Reutimann																		13								124
76	Derrike Cope						36								33												119
77	Marc Davis																	16									115
78	Aric Almirola									17																	112
79	Regan Smith										17																112
80	Larry Foyt	18																									109
81	Jamie McMurray																					18					109
82	James Buescher																									19	106
83	Ben Stancill																					20					103
84	Paul Tracy																							20			103
85	Brett Thompson																								21		100
86	Kenny Wallace																								22		97
87	Johnny Sauter																					23					94
88	Justin Allgaier													24													91
89	Patrick Carpentier																25										88
90	Jennifer Jo Cobb					33								26													85
91	Joey Logano																				26						85
92	Hermie Sadler																					26					85
93	Brian Sockwell	DNQ					29																				76
94	Craig Wood																					DNQ			29		76
95	Bobby Dotter																		30								73
96	Cale Gale																							30			73
97	Richard Johns																				31		30				70
98	John Mickel						31																				70
99	Benny Gordon							31																			70
100	Brandon Knupp															31											70
101	Bradley Riethmeyer																	31									70
102	Joey Clanton	32																									67
103	Russ Dugger																					DNQ			32		67
104	Jimmie Johnson																34										66
105	Johnny Chapman											36			34										33		64
106	Ryan Seaman								33			35															64
107	Rick Markle										33																64
108	Ryan Mathews																							33			64
109	Larry Gunselman								34	35		34															61
110	Mike Harmon					35																				DNQ	61
111	Ryan Hackett																									34	61
112	Michelle Theriault					35																					58
113	Sean Caisse																					36					55
114	Kevin Lepage																									36	55
115	A. J. Allmendinger		17																								
116	Gary St. Amant							28																			
117	Mike Olsen																		32								
118	Morgan Shepherd		34																								
119	Dustin Skinner																					34					
120	Robert Bruce																					DNQ					
121	J. R. Norris									QL^{‡}																	
Pos	Driver	DAY	CAL	ATL	MAR	KAN	CLT	MFD	DOV	TEX	MCH	MIL	MEM	KEN	IRP	NSH	BRI	GTW	NHA	LVS	TAL	MAR	ATL	TEX	PHO	HOM	Points
^{†} – Michael Annett qualified for Scott Speed at Texas I (race #9).^{‡} – J. R. Norris qualified for Kyle Busch at Texas I (race #9).

== See also ==
- 2008 NASCAR Sprint Cup Series
- 2008 NASCAR Nationwide Series
- 2008 NASCAR Camping World East Series
- 2008 NASCAR Camping World West Series
- 2008 ARCA Re/Max Series
- 2008 NASCAR Whelen Modified Tour
- 2008 NASCAR Whelen Southern Modified Tour
- 2008 NASCAR Corona Series
- 2008 NASCAR Canadian Tire Series
