= Triad =

A triad or triade is a group of three items.

Triad or triade may also refer to:

== Humanities ==
- Trichotomy (philosophy), often called triads
- Triad (sociology), a group of three people as a unit of study
- Triad (relationship), or ménage à trois
- Dark triad, theory of offensive personality

== Music ==
- Triad (music), chord consisting of root, third and fifth

== Science and technology ==
- Triad (anatomy), structure in skeletal muscles, formed by a T tubule surrounded by sarcoplasmic reticulum
- Triad (computing), three bits of information storage
- Triad (environmental science), management system for environmental cleanup
- Triad (monitors), group of three phosphor dots used in some computer monitors
- List of medical triads, tetrads, and pentads
- Nuclear triad
- Triad, a brand name of the combination medication butalbital/acetaminophen
- The TRIAD Method for determining spacecraft attitude

== Religion ==
- Triad (religion), a grouping of three gods

== Businesses and organisations ==
- Triad (American fraternities), certain historic groupings of seminal college fraternities in North America
- Triad (organized crime), a Chinese transnational organized crime syndicate
- TRIAD Berlin, a German exhibit design company
- Triad Broadcasting, an American radio station operator
- Triad GSI, an American voting machine company
- Triad High School (disambiguation), several uses
- Triad Hospitals, an American hospital operator
- Triad International, a multi-national private investment corporation
- Triad Racing Technologies, a body parts and chassis supplier for NASCAR teams
- Triad Securities, a finance company
- Triad Theater, a performing arts venue in New York City

== Places ==
- The Triad (mountain), in Washington, U.S.
- Piedmont Triad, or simply the Triad, a region of North Carolina, U.S.
- Triad Islands, in Antarctica

== Arts and entertainment ==
=== Fictional characters ===
- The Triad (Charmed), fictional characters in the TV series
- Triad (superhero), alias of DC Comics' Luornu Durgo

=== Film and television ===
- Triad (film), a 1938 German film
- Triad, a 2012 Hong Kong film starring William Chan

=== Music ===
- The Triad (album), by Pantha du Prince, 2016
- Triad (band), a Swedish music group
- "Triad", a track on Enya's 1987 album Enya
- "Triad" (Pitchshifter song), 1993
- "Triad" (David Crosby song), 1967
- "Triad", a song by Tool from their 2001 album Lateralus
- "Triad", a song by Jefferson Airplane from their 1968 album "Crown Of Creation"

=== Other uses in arts and entertainment ===
- Triads (Gregory Palamas), a set of nine treatises by 14th-century Byzantine Greek theologian St. Gregory Palamas
- Triad, a 2013 video game by Anna Anthropy
- Triad (sculpture), a 1980 outdoor sculpture by Evelyn Franz
- Welsh Triads, collections of medieval Welsh legend and history
- Triads of Ireland, a collection of Old Irish writings
- The Triad (magazine) (1915–1927), Australian arts magazine

== Vessels ==
- HMS Triad (N88), headquarters ship of the British navy in the Persian Gulf
- HMS Triad (N53), a T-class submarine of the UK Royal Navy

== See also ==
- 3 (disambiguation)
- Third (disambiguation)
- Triadic (disambiguation)
- Trichotomy (disambiguation)
- Trinity (disambiguation)
- Trio (disambiguation)
- Tripartite (disambiguation)
- Triple (disambiguation)
- Triplet (disambiguation)
- Troika (disambiguation)
- Triadi, a village in Thessaloniki, Greece
- Triadization, a proposed alternative to the theory of globalization
- Triiad, a fictional entity in TV series Hypernauts
- Triumvirate
- Dyad (disambiguation) ("group of 2")
- Tetrad (disambiguation) ("group of 4")
- Hendiatris, figure of speech
