= Bill Davis (NASCAR owner) =

American NASCAR car owner (1951–2025)

William Arthur Davis III (January 18, 1951 – September 6, 2025) was an American NASCAR car owner who won the Daytona 500 with Ward Burton in 2002 and the 2001 Southern 500, also with Burton. His team, Bill Davis Racing, fielded the #22 Caterpillar Inc. Toyota Camry and the #23 & #27 Camrys in the Sprint Cup series, as well as Toyotas in the Camping World Truck Series for Mike Skinner, Tyler Walker, Johnny Benson Jr., Bill Lester, and others. Davis was listed as owner of the #77 Penske Dodge in the Sprint Cup series, driven by Sam Hornish Jr. in 2008.

Davis built his personal fortune through his ownership of Bill Davis Trucking, which he shut down in 2007 after filing Chapter 11 bankruptcy.

Davis sold his engines and team to Triad Racing Technologies in late 2008. Davis was a resident of Arkansas, having been born in Fayetteville and resided in Batesville for much of his life. In 2016, Davis was inducted in to the Arkansas Sports Hall of Fame. He died on September 6, 2025, at the age of 74.

== See also ==
- Biography at NASCAR.com
