= Bill Davis Racing =

Defunct stock car racing team

- Owner(s): Bill and Gail Davis
- Base: High Point, North Carolina
- Series: Sprint Cup Series; Nationwide Series; Craftsman Truck Series
- Manufacturer: Dodge; Ford; Pontiac; Toyota
- Opened: 1989
- Closed: 2008

Career
- Debut: 1993 Daytona 500 (Daytona)
- Latest race: 2008 Ford 400 (Homestead)
- Drivers' Championships: 1 (Craftsman Truck Series)
- Race victories: Cup Series: 5 Xfinity: 11; Camping World Truck Series: 24

Bill Davis Racing was a racing team that participated in all three of NASCAR's top divisions until 2009.

The team had run Toyota-branded stock cars and trucks in the Camping World Truck Series (Toyota Tundra) since 2004 and Sprint Cup Series (Toyota Camry) since 2007. Dodge, Pontiac and Ford previously backed the team. The team was notable for running the No. 22 since its inception and its long relationship with Caterpillar Inc. BDR was competitive throughout the 1990s and early 2000s with Ward Burton before fading due to an increase in competition and a fallout with manufacturer Dodge. The team was sold to Triad Racing Technologies in late 2008, which shut down the team's racing entries and transitioned to producing engines and chassis for various Toyota NASCAR teams.

== Beginnings ==
BDR was formed by then-truck rental owner Bill Davis, who himself was a former motocross racer. Davis helped his friend and business partner Julian Martin develop his son Mark's ASA racing program. When Martin signed with Jim Stacy, Davis took a break from racing, but returned to hire Martin to drive his Busch Series car for 15 races with sponsorship from Carolina Ford Dealers. In 1990, Davis moved the team to High Point, North Carolina, while his wife Gail stayed in Arkansas to oversee the trucking operation.

== Sprint Cup Series ==
=== Car No. 22 history ===
Bobby Labonte (1993–1994)

Upon arriving in Carolina, Davis was asked by Ford to hire up-and-coming Midwest driver Jeff Gordon, who won the NASCAR Rookie of the Year in 1991 and won eleven pole positions the next year. Davis was hoping to move him and crew chief Ray Evernham to the Winston Cup Series, but they were lured away by Rick Hendrick. Davis still moved up to the Cup Series full-time in 1993 however, with 1991 Busch Series champion Bobby Labonte, who finished 2nd to Gordon for Winston Cup Rookie of the Year driving the No. 22 Maxwell House-sponsored Ford. The team switched to Pontiac the following season. After 1994, Labonte left to drive for Joe Gibbs Racing. MBNA replaced Maxwell House as the sponsor.

Randy LaJoie (1995)

Originally, Davis went with another rookie — Busch Series standout Randy LaJoie — to drive the car. Midway through the year, LaJoie was fired from the team and replaced by a series of rotating drivers including Wally Dallenbach Jr., who finished second at Watkins Glen. Finally, Ward Burton was hired to finish out the year. He scored the team's first win at Rockingham Speedway in late 1995.

Ward Burton (1995–2003)

With Burton driving, the No. 22 team slowly began to improve, despite not winning any races. In 1998, the No. 22 team cracked the top ten in the final Winston Cup points standings and matched those results in 1999 (by which time Caterpillar Inc. was their sponsor) and in 2000, when the team finally returned to victory lane at the spring Darlington race. Burton's second career win was the team's last victory in a Pontiac as they joined several teams in switching to Dodge Intrepids for the following season.

Burton returned to victory lane the following season, winning the 2001 Southern 500. This would become Dodge's second win since returning to NASCAR, but the team's streak of consecutive top ten points finishes was broken at three, as the No. 22 finished fourteenth. Burton added 2 more wins in 2002, scoring a victory in the Daytona 500 (Dodge's first Daytona 500 win in twenty-eight years) and later in the year at the New England 300 at New Hampshire, but a series of inconsistent finishes dropped the team to twenty-fifth place in the points standings. Burton's win at New Hampshire, in addition to being his last win in the Cup series, was also BDR's last in Cup racing (although they won races in other series before folding).

Scott Wimmer (2003–2005)

The team's struggles continued in the 2003 season, and with four races left in the season Burton, who had already signed on to drive the No. 0 for Haas CNC Racing the following season, departed for that team and was replaced with Davis's Busch driver Scott Wimmer, who raced full-time in 2004 and finished third in the first race of his rookie season. In late-2005, BDR announced it would part ways with Wimmer at the end of the year.

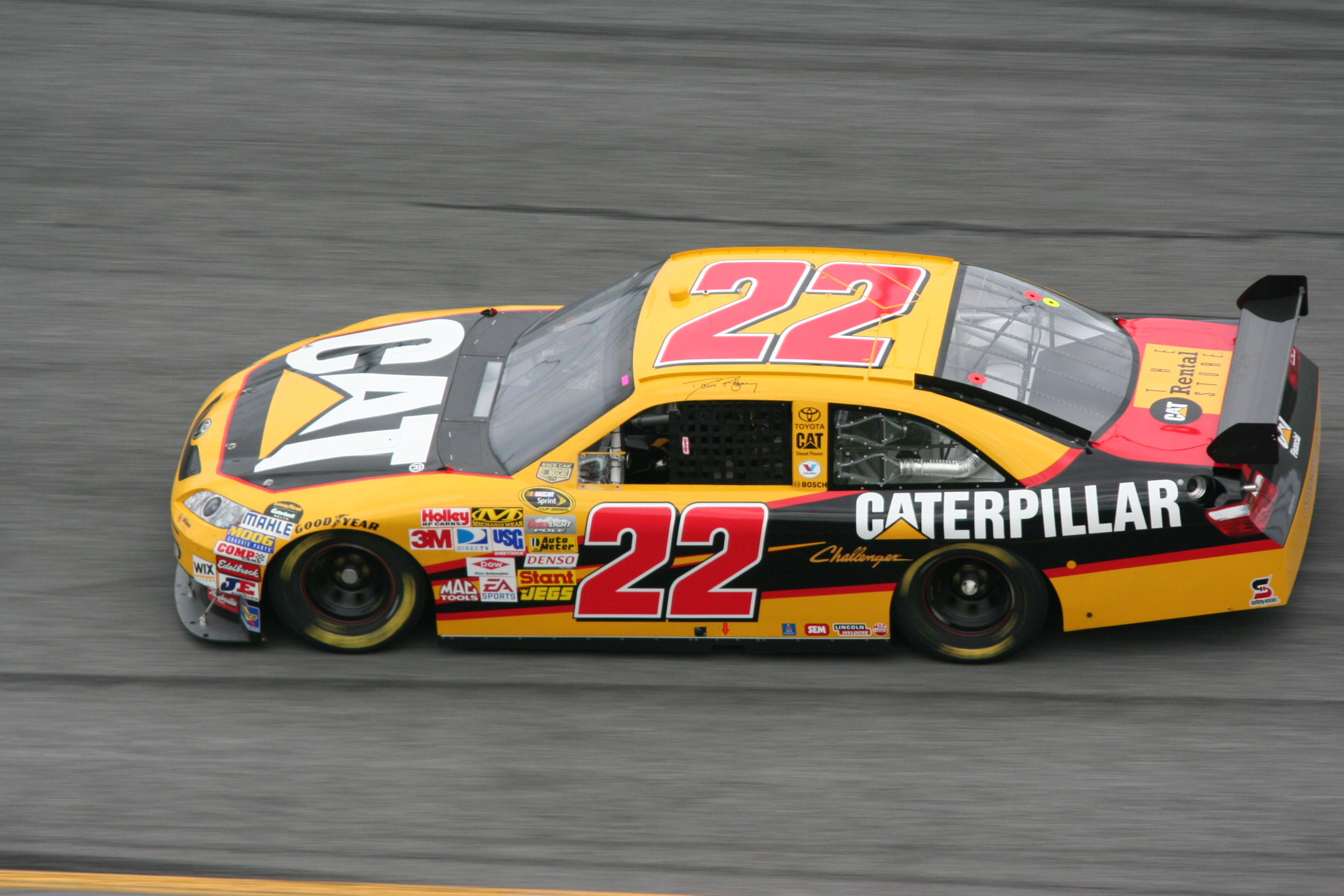
The No. 22 Caterpillar car in 2008

Dave Blaney (2006–2008)

Dave Blaney, who previously drove the No. 93 for BDR, was hired to drive the No. 22 beginning with the 2006 season. He had two top tens and finished twenty-sixth in the points standings. In 2007, the team switched to Toyota. Blaney won the pole for the 2007 Lenox Industrial Tools 300 at New Hampshire, making this the first pole for Toyota in the Sprint Cup Series. Blaney scored his first top ten with Toyota at Indianapolis Motor Speedway on July 29 and later that season, he finished third at Talladega, the best finish of any Toyota in 2007. Additionally, Blaney was the only Toyota driver in the top thirty-five in owner points after the 2007 season. The team had a rough start to the 2008 season, as they missed the Aaron's 499 which was a hard hit for the team. They returned the next week at Richmond to finish in eighteenth. The following week at Darlington, they finished ninth, scoring their best of the year. In June of that year, Caterpillar announced that it would leave the No. 22 Bill Davis Racing Toyota to sponsor the Richard Childress Racing's No. 31 car, starting in 2009. On December 22, 2008, it was announced that Bill Davis sold majority ownership of his NASCAR teams to Mike Held, a California businessman, and Marty Gaunt, an executive with BDR. That same day, Gaunt and Held announced that they would also be buying into Triad Racing Technologies. Blaney would leave TRT to drive for Prism Motorsports, and Penske Racing would buy the owners points of the No. 22 and transfer them to the No. 77 of Sam Hornish Jr. The addition of Davis would change the team name to Penske Championship Racing.

==== Car No. 22 results ====
Year	Driver	No.	Make	1	2	3	4	5	6	7	8	9	10	11	12	13	14	15	16	17	18	19	20	21	22	23	24	25	26	27	28	29	30	31	32	33	34	35	36	Owners	Pts
1993	Bobby Labonte	22	Ford	DAY; 20	CAR; 33	RCH; 29	ATL; 18	DAR; 18	BRI; 24	NWS; 25	MAR; 12	TAL; 35	SON; 16	CLT; 8	DOV; 19	POC; 20	MCH; 36	DAY; 41	NHA; 10	POC; 15	TAL; 15	GLN; 7	MCH; 8	BRI; 15	DAR; 14	RCH; 13	DOV; 7	MAR; 32	NWS; 12	CLT; 28	CAR; 22	PHO; 8	ATL; 14							19th	3221
1994	Bobby Labonte	22	Pontiac	DAY; 16	CAR; 19	RCH; 24	ATL; 15	DAR; 39	BRI; 6	NWS; 26	MAR; 19	TAL; 22	SON; 17	CLT; 40	DOV; 20	POC; 25	MCH; 15	DAY; 22	NHA; 13	POC; 13	TAL; 12	IND; 16	GLN; 18	MCH; 5	BRI; 31	DAR; 36	RCH; 24	DOV; 17	MAR; 31	NWS; 15	CLT; 42	CAR; 28	PHO; 16	ATL; 37						22nd	3038
1995	Randy LaJoie	22	Pontiac	DAY; 29	CAR; 25	RCH; 27	ATL; 39	DAR; 16	BRI; 12	NWS; 23	MAR; DNQ	TAL; 13	SON; 32	CLT; 23	DOV; 23	POC; 40	MCH; 41																							28th	2688
1995	Jimmy Hensley	22	Pontiac															DAY; 30	NHA; 41	POC; 32	TAL; DNQ	IND; 32		MCH; 22																28th	2688
1995	Wally Dallenbach Jr.	22	Pontiac																				GLN; 2																	28th	2688
1995	Ward Burton	22	Pontiac																						BRI; 34	DAR; 4	RCH; 11	DOV; 21	MAR; 21	NWS; DNQ	CLT; 7	CAR; 1	PHO; 42	ATL; 5						28th	2688
1996	Ward Burton	22	Pontiac	DAY; 26	CAR; 41	RCH; 13	ATL; 15	DAR; 38	BRI; 33	NWS; DNQ	MAR; DNQ	TAL; 27	SON; 10	CLT; 11	DOV; 16	POC; 35	MCH; 35	DAY; 41	NHA; 25	POC; 22	TAL; 33	IND; 36	GLN; 32	MCH; 35	BRI; 8	DAR; 40	RCH; 37	DOV; 7	MAR; DNQ	NWS; DNQ	CLT; 7	CAR; 17	PHO; 22	ATL; 12						33rd	2411
1997	Ward Burton	22	Pontiac	DAY; 8	CAR; 23	RCH; 24	ATL; 12	DAR; 18	TEX; 7	BRI; 18	MAR; 18	SON; 10	TAL; 42	CLT; 36	DOV; 34	POC; 38*	MCH; 35	CAL; 28	DAY; 26	NHA; 36	POC; 15	IND; 19	GLN; 41	MCH; 28	BRI; 17	DAR; 27	RCH; 7	NHA; 23	DOV; 22	MAR; 7	CLT; 8	TAL; DNQ	CAR; 26	PHO; 42	ATL; 9					24th	2987
1998	Ward Burton	22	Pontiac	DAY; 25	CAR; 11	LVS; 18	ATL; 24	DAR; 11	BRI; 17	TEX; 15	MAR; 28	TAL; 8	CAL; 12	CLT; 34	DOV; 29	RCH; 19	MCH; 8	POC; 24	SON; 40	NHA; 23	POC; 34	IND; 34	GLN; 21	MCH; 37	BRI; 37	NHA; 31	DAR; 12	RCH; 28	DOV; 33	MAR; 11	CLT; 2	TAL; 30	DAY; 7	PHO; 14	CAR; 7	ATL; 14				16th	3352
1999	Ward Burton	22	Pontiac	DAY; 24	CAR; 28	LVS; 2	ATL; 8	DAR; 8	TEX; 16	BRI; 9	MAR; 27	TAL; 32	CAL; 6	RCH; 9	CLT; 8	DOV; 22	MCH; 4	POC; 29	SON; 35	DAY; 7	NHA; 15	POC; 40	IND; 6	GLN; 43	MCH; 43	BRI; 9	DAR; 2	RCH; 34	NHA; 8	DOV; 11	MAR; 13	CLT; 5	TAL; 4	CAR; 2	PHO; 13	HOM; 14	ATL; 11			9th	4062
2000	Ward Burton	22	Pontiac	DAY; 8	CAR; 3	LVS; 23	ATL; 8	DAR; 1*	BRI; 3	TEX; 14	MAR; 11	TAL; 10	CAL; 6	RCH; 6	CLT; 13	DOV; 8	MCH; 6	POC; 27	SON; 21	DAY; 7	NHA; 18	POC; 28	IND; 28	GLN; 22	MCH; 9	BRI; 11	DAR; 6	RCH; 8	NHA; 30	DOV; 40	MAR; 43	CLT; 10	TAL; 22	CAR; 8	PHO; 12	HOM; 39	ATL; 3			10th	4152
2001	Ward Burton	22	Dodge	DAY; 35*	CAR; 16	LVS; 21	ATL; 11	DAR; 12	BRI; 5	TEX; 21	MAR; 22	TAL; 33	CAL; 42	RCH; 21	CLT; 9	DOV; 14	MCH; 38	POC; 40	SON; 6	DAY; 4	CHI; 20	NHA; 20	POC; 38	IND; 6	GLN; 41	MCH; 33	BRI; 12	DAR; 1	RCH; 12	DOV; 33	KAN; 41	CLT; 3	MAR; 3	TAL; 21	PHO; 13	CAR; 6	HOM; 13	ATL; 5	NHA; 42	14th	3846
2002	Ward Burton	22	Dodge	DAY; 1	CAR; 13	LVS; 21	ATL; 7	DAR; 31	BRI; 25	TEX; 43	MAR; 14	TAL; 15	CAL; 18	RCH; 30*	CLT; 42	DOV; 37	POC; 33	MCH; 42	SON; 40	DAY; 9	CHI; 41	NHA; 1	POC; 14	IND; 30	GLN; 20	MCH; 29	BRI; 37	DAR; 6	RCH; 8	NHA; 38	DOV; 43	KAN; 43	TAL; 10	CLT; 33	MAR; 5*	ATL; 16	CAR; 40	PHO; 19	HOM; 12	25th	3362
2003	Ward Burton	22	Dodge	DAY; 38	CAR; 18	LVS; 25	ATL; 18	DAR; 29	BRI; 33	TEX; 12	TAL; 7	MAR; 25	CAL; 21	RCH; 11	CLT; 10	DOV; 37	POC; 8	MCH; 30	SON; 16	DAY; 30	CHI; 19	NHA; 25	POC; 19	IND; 26	GLN; 6	MCH; 14	BRI; 13	DAR; 19	RCH; 15	NHA; 39	DOV; 29	TAL; 14	KAN; 21	CLT; 28	MAR; 18					21st	3550
2003	Scott Wimmer	22	Dodge																																	ATL; 32	PHO; 9	CAR; 26	HOM; 12	21st	3550
2004	Scott Wimmer	22	Dodge	DAY; 3	CAR; 15	LVS; 39	ATL; 27	DAR; 16	BRI; 13	TEX; 33	MAR; 29	TAL; 18	CAL; 30	RCH; 30	CLT; 28	DOV; 9	POC; 35	MCH; 14	SON; 25	DAY; 32	CHI; 23	NHA; 18	POC; 11	IND; 32	GLN; 19	MCH; 18	BRI; 36	CAL; 21	RCH; 38	NHA; 36	DOV; 23	TAL; 31	KAN; 36	CLT; 26	MAR; 20	ATL; DNQ	PHO; 26	DAR; 22	HOM; 13	27th	3198
2005	Scott Wimmer	22	Dodge	DAY; 33	CAL; 16	LVS; 27	ATL; 20	BRI; 27	MAR; 31	TEX; 42	PHO; 32	TAL; 38	DAR; 25	RCH; 20	CLT; 23	DOV; 31	POC; 36	MCH; 16	SON; 25	DAY; 32	CHI; 17	NHA; 35	POC; 25	IND; 26	GLN; 21	MCH; 23	BRI; 14	CAL; 31	RCH; 24	NHA; 26	DOV; 36	TAL; 17	KAN; 27	CLT; 20	MAR; 25	ATL; 27	TEX; 27	PHO; 21	HOM; 11	32nd	3122
2006	Dave Blaney	22	Dodge	DAY; 22	CAL; 30	LVS; 31	ATL; 32	BRI; 23	MAR; 17	TEX; 29	PHO; 27	TAL; 24	RCH; 20	DAR; 27	CLT; 32	DOV; 30	POC; 27	MCH; 30	SON; 39	DAY; 27	CHI; 17	NHA; 13	POC; 16	IND; 29	GLN; 40	MCH; 24	BRI; 14	CAL; 28	RCH; 4	NHA; 9	DOV; 12	KAN; 21	TAL; 28	CLT; 26	MAR; 33	ATL; 18	TEX; 32	PHO; 23	HOM; 26	27th	3255
2007	Dave Blaney	22	Toyota	DAY; 34	CAL; 39	LVS; 42	ATL; 27	BRI; 23	MAR; 37	TEX; 21	PHO; 39	TAL; DNQ	RCH; 11	DAR; 32	CLT; 18	DOV; DNQ	POC; 43	MCH; 18	SON; 41	NHA; 29	DAY; 23	CHI; 40	IND; 9	POC; 20	GLN; 35	MCH; 6	BRI; 31	CAL; 38	RCH; 34	NHA; 35	DOV; DNQ	KAN; 15	TAL; 3	CLT; 6	MAR; 36	ATL; 38	TEX; 21	PHO; 31	HOM; 12	31st	2781
2008	Dave Blaney	22	Toyota	DAY; 28	CAL; 30	LVS; 26	ATL; 34	BRI; 34	MAR; 43	TEX; 21	PHO; 30	TAL; DNQ	RCH; 18	DAR; 9	CLT; 17	DOV; 9	POC; 22	MCH; 39	SON; 20	NHA; 33	DAY; 19	CHI; 23	IND; 35	POC; 31	GLN; 41	MCH; 41	BRI; 38	CAL; 29	RCH; 22	NHA; 33	DOV; 12	KAN; 31	TAL; 22	CLT; 27	MAR; 22	ATL; 41	TEX; 29	PHO; 20	HOM; 22	30th	2851

=== Car No. 27 history ===
Dave Blaney (2000–2001)

The second full-time team made its debut in Winston Cup as the No. 93 with an Amoco sponsorship in 2000, with Dave Blaney driving. Despite failing to qualify at the spring Rockingham race, Blaney finished 3rd in the Rookie of the year standings. The team flirted with victory lane a few times in 2001, but Amoco decided not to renew its contract, and Blaney left for Jasper Motorsports.

Hut Stricklin (2002)

The car returned for the 2002 season with a new sponsor, number (#23) and driver. Hut Stricklin moved over from Donlavey Racing and brought sponsorship from Hills Brothers Coffee with him. Stricklin started off 2002 by failing to qualify for the Daytona 500 and was inconsistent for much of the season. He recorded five top twenty finishes, but also finished 35th or worse 6 times and did not even attempt the race at Watkins Glen. Stricklin left the team after the Sharpie 500 at Bristol, and Hills Brothers announced they would be pulling sponsorship.

Kenny Wallace (2002–03)

Around this time, there was another driver looking for a full time ride that had a sponsor ready to back him. Kenny Wallace had not raced a full season in Cup since Andy Petree released him following the 2000 season, and had been racing primarily in the Busch Series for Innovative Motorsports in their #48 Stacker 2 Chevrolet. However, he had been active as a long-term injury replacement for Steve Park in the #1 Pennzoil Chevrolet at Dale Earnhardt, Inc. earlier in 2002 and had also made several starts in Cup races for his Busch Series team in the #98 car.

Davis and Wallace began to negotiate terms since both sides had ends that each other was desiring, as Wallace was able to bring his backing from Stacker 2 to his new team and Davis needed a driver for his second car. First, Wallace would immediately join BDR and run the #23 for the remainder of the 2002 season with Hills Brothers Coffee remaining as sponsor. When the new season began, Stacker 2 would come aboard to sponsor the #23 with Wallace driving.

Wallace ran at the Southern 500 and nine other races in the #23 to close out the year. He missed the Old Dominion 500 at Martinsville due to conflicts with the Busch race weekend at Memphis, and he had already agreed to run the EA Sports 500 at Talladega for Andy Petree in conjunction with a promotion by AT&T. In those ten starts, Wallace's best finish was eleventh at Phoenix. Scott Wimmer and Geoff Bodine ran the #23 in the other two events, with Wimmer recording a 17th-place finish at Talladega.

Wallace ran all 36 races in 2003 with one top ten finish, which he recorded at Bristol. After the season, BDR moved Wallace and Stacker 2 to the Busch Series full-time to replace Wimmer, who was promoted to Cup racing. Following the year, Davis shut down his second-full time operation.

Part-time (2004–06)

Dave Blaney made several starts for the team in 2004, including the Daytona 500. In 2004 and 2005 the car ran mostly unsponsored, with a couple of drivers running selected events. Shane Hmiel, Tony Raines, and Blaney ran the car in 2004. Mike Skinner ran six events in 2005.

Mike Skinner failed to qualify for the 2006 Daytona 500, but Bill Lester became the first African American since Willy T. Ribbs to compete in a Cup race at the Golden Corral 500. He started nineteenth and finished thirty-ninth. Lester attempted two more races that season, finishing thirty-second at Michigan, but failing to qualify at California Speedway.

Jeremy Mayfield (2007)

Jeremy Mayfield was hired drive the car full-time in 2007, with the car renumbered No. 36 for a new sponsorship from 360 OTC. Due to Waltrip taking the team's points, Mayfield needed to qualify on time for the first five races of 2007. After four consecutive failed qualifying attempts, the No. 36 car made its first start of 2007 in the Food City 500 at Bristol. Mayfield drove the car at every track except for Sonoma, when the team did not enter but the R&D team used the No. 36 points. In October, Mayfield departed to Haas CNC Racing, and was replaced by Skinner and Benson for the balance of the season.

Jacques Villeneuve (2008)

The car was then scheduled to continue full-time racing, once again in a renumbered car. Jacques Villeneuve planned to drive the No. 27 in 2008, but the deal fell through after sponsorship could not be found. Benson and Skinner were hired to take over in the interim, before the team folded four races into the season after continued financial difficulties.

==== Car No. 27 results ====
Year	Driver	No.	Make	1	2	3	4	5	6	7	8	9	10	11	12	13	14	15	16	17	18	19	20	21	22	23	24	25	26	27	28	29	30	31	32	33	34	35	36	Owners	Pts
1999	Dave Blaney	93	Pontiac	DAY	CAR	LVS	ATL	DAR	TEX	BRI	MAR	TAL	CAL	RCH	CLT	DOV	MCH; 33	POC	SON	DAY	NHA; 40	POC	IND; 28	GLN	MCH	BRI	DAR	RCH	NHA	DOV	MAR	CLT	TAL	CAR	PHO	HOM; 23	ATL; 37			51st	332
2000	Dave Blaney	93	Pontiac	DAY; 27	CAR; DNQ	LVS; 22	ATL; 20	DAR; 26	BRI; 35	TEX; 22	MAR; 41	TAL; 30	CAL; 38	RCH; 34	CLT; 40	DOV; 25	MCH; 25	POC; 30	SON; 29	DAY; 24	NHA; 34	POC; 18	IND; 23	GLN; 35	MCH; 24	BRI; 43	DAR; 20	RCH; 18	NHA; 26	DOV; 39	MAR; 30	CLT; 28	TAL; 28	CAR; 42	PHO; 8	HOM; 9	ATL; 18			31st	2656
2001	Dave Blaney	93	Dodge	DAY; 42	CAR; 9	LVS; 26	ATL; 34	DAR; 22	BRI; 29	TEX; 6	MAR; 29	TAL; 17	CAL; 29	RCH; 33	CLT; 33	DOV; 33	MCH; 8	POC; 11	SON; 32	DAY; 21	CHI; 12	NHA; 37	POC; 22	IND; 40	GLN; 28	MCH; 6	BRI; 18	DAR; 19	RCH; 26	DOV; 35	KAN; 10	CLT; 41	MAR; 29	TAL; 30	PHO; 28	CAR; 14	HOM; 6	ATL; 41	NHA; 11	22nd	3303
2002	Hut Stricklin	23	Dodge	DAY; DNQ	CAR; 27	LVS; 24	ATL; 43	DAR; 32	BRI; 35	TEX; 27	MAR; 15	TAL; 11	CAL; 40	RCH; 16	CLT; 22	DOV; 26	POC; 22	MCH; 17	SON; 33	DAY; 26	CHI; 36	NHA; 31	POC; 31	IND; 17		MCH; 36	BRI; 38													32nd	3077
2002	Tom Hubert	23	Dodge																						GLN; 24															32nd	3077
2002	Kenny Wallace	23	Dodge																									DAR; 25	RCH; 14	NHA; 18	DOV; 27	KAN; 16		CLT; 25		ATL; 36	CAR; 13	PHO; 11	HOM; 23	32nd	3077
2002	Scott Wimmer	23	Dodge																														TAL; 17							32nd	3077
2002	Geoff Bodine	23	Dodge																																MAR; 39					32nd	3077
2003	Kenny Wallace	23	Dodge	DAY; 16	CAR; 38	LVS; 30	ATL; 26	DAR; 23	BRI; 10	TEX; 23	TAL; 17	MAR; 12	CAL; 22	RCH; 29	CLT; 42	DOV; 23	POC; 29	MCH; 25	SON; 29	DAY; 15	CHI; 24	NHA; 38	POC; 32	IND; 24	GLN; 34	MCH; 42	BRI; 15	DAR; 24	RCH; 23	NHA; 36	DOV; 28	TAL; 20	KAN; 31	CLT; 32	MAR; 16	ATL; 30	PHO; 25	CAR; 31	HOM; 22	30th	3061
2004	Dave Blaney	23	Dodge	DAY; 15	CAR	LVS	ATL; 11	DAR	BRI	TEX; 11	MAR	TAL; 39	CAL	RCH	CLT; 17	DOV; 33	POC	MCH	SON																					43rd	986
2004	Tony Raines	23	Dodge																	DAY; DNQ	CHI	NHA	POC	IND; 30	GLN	MCH	BRI													43rd	986
2004	Shane Hmiel	23	Dodge																									CAL; 39	RCH; 29	NHA	DOV	TAL	KAN; 24	CLT	MAR	ATL; 24	PHO	DAR	HOM; 41	43rd	986
2005	Mike Skinner	23	Dodge	DAY; 30	CAL	LVS	ATL	BRI	MAR	TEX	PHO	TAL; 42	DAR	RCH	CLT; 41	DOV; DNQ	POC	MCH; 34	SON	DAY	CHI	NHA	POC	IND; 29	GLN	MCH	BRI	CAL	RCH	NHA	DOV	TAL	KAN	CLT	MAR					52nd	459
2005	Johnny Benson	23	Dodge																																	ATL; 28	TEX	PHO	HOM	52nd	459
2006	Mike Skinner	23	Dodge	DAY; DNQ	CAL	LVS																																		62nd	111
2006	Bill Lester	23	Dodge				ATL; 38	BRI	MAR	TEX	PHO	TAL	RCH	DAR	CLT	DOV	POC	MCH; 32	SON	DAY	CHI	NHA	POC	IND	GLN	MCH	BRI	CAL; DNQ	RCH	NHA	DOV	KAN	TAL	CLT	MAR	ATL	TEX	PHO	HOM	62nd	111
2007	Jeremy Mayfield	36	Toyota	DAY; DNQ	CAL; DNQ	LVS; DNQ	ATL; DNQ	BRI; 34	MAR; 40	TEX; DNQ	PHO; DNQ	TAL; 23	RCH; DNQ	DAR; DNQ	CLT; 25	DOV; 38	POC; DNQ	MCH; DNQ	SON	NHA; 40	DAY; DNQ	CHI; 26	IND; DNQ	POC; 31	GLN; 27	MCH; DNQ	BRI; 37	CAL; 36	RCH; DNQ	NHA; DNQ	DOV; DNQ	KAN; 22	TAL; DNQ	CLT; 39	MAR; DNQ					44th	1568
2007	Mike Skinner	36	Toyota																																	ATL; DNQ	TEX; 24			44th	1568
2007	Johnny Benson	36	Toyota																																			PHO; 36	HOM; 43	44th	1568
2008	Jacques Villeneuve	27	Toyota	DAY; DNQ																																				53rd	130
2008	Mike Skinner	27	Toyota		CAL; DNQ	LVS; 30																																		53rd	130
2008	Johnny Benson	27	Toyota				ATL; DNQ	BRI	MAR	TEX	PHO	TAL	RCH	DAR	CLT	DOV	POC	MCH	SON	NHA	DAY	CHI	IND	POC	GLN	MCH	BRI	CAL	RCH	NHA	DOV	KAN	TAL	CLT	MAR	ATL	TEX	PHO	HOM	53rd	130

=== Third car history ===
Bill Davis fielded a third part-time team for R&D purposes on numerous occasions. This car switched numerous times between No. 23 and No. 27.

The No. 23 car made its debut at the season finale NAPA 500 in 2000 with Scott Wimmer driving the No. 23 AT&T sponsored Pontiac.

In 2001, the car once again did not appear until the final Atlanta race of the year. There, Hut Stricklin, preparing for his 2002 ride with the team, raced to an impressive 11th-place finish.

The following year, Stricklin and the No. 23 car moved to the full-time spot, while the R&D car was renumbered to No. 27. Wimmer returned to the team, attempting seven races. He qualifies for two races, finishing neither.

For the 2003 season, the third BDR team experimented with manufacturers, running Chevrolets as opposed to the standard Dodges. Wimmer attempted three starts for the team before taking over for Ward Burton in the No. 22. In the fall Atlanta race, Shelby Howard made his only Cup attempt, failing to qualify. The R&D team merged with the second full-time team in for 2004-05 as Davis scaled back to a two car operation.

The No. 23 car attempted the Daytona 500 in 2007 with Mike Skinner, but did not qualify. Veteran road racing specialist Butch Leitzinger ran the No. 23 car with special CAT sponsorship at Sonoma. In the later stages of 2007, the renumbered No. 27 made the UAW-Ford 500 and the Checker Auto Parts 500 with Jacques Villeneuve driving.

Year	Driver	No.	Make	1	2	3	4	5	6	7	8	9	10	11	12	13	14	15	16	17	18	19	20	21	22	23	24	25	26	27	28	29	30	31	32	33	34	35	36	Owners	Pts
2000	Scott Wimmer	23	Pontiac	DAY	CAR	LVS	ATL	DAR	BRI	TEX	MAR	TAL	CAL	RCH	CLT	DOV	MCH	POC	SON	DAY	NHA	POC	IND	GLN	MCH	BRI	DAR	RCH	NHA	DOV	MAR	CLT	TAL	CAR	PHO	HOM	ATL; 22			56th	68
2001	Hut Stricklin	23	Dodge	DAY	CAR	LVS	ATL	DAR	BRI	TEX	MAR	TAL	CAL	RCH	CLT	DOV	MCH	POC	SON	DAY	CHI	NHA	POC	IND	GLN	MCH	BRI	DAR	RCH	DOV	KAN	CLT	MAR	TAL	PHO	CAR	HOM	ATL; 11	NHA	54th	130
2002	Scott Wimmer	27	Dodge	DAY	CAR	LVS	ATL	DAR	BRI	TEX	MAR	TAL	CAL	RCH	CLT	DOV	POC	MCH	SON	DAY	CHI; DNQ	NHA	POC	IND; DNQ	GLN	MCH	BRI; 40	DAR	RCH	NHA	DOV; DNQ	KAN	TAL	CLT; DNQ	MAR	ATL; DNQ	CAR	PHO; 42	HOM	56th	192
2003	Scott Wimmer	27	Chevy	DAY	CAR	LVS	ATL	DAR	BRI	TEX	TAL	MAR	CAL	RCH	CLT	DOV	POC	MCH	SON	DAY	CHI	NHA	POC	IND	GLN	MCH	BRI; 24	DAR	RCH	NHA; 24	DOV; DNQ	TAL	KAN	CLT	MAR					53rd	220
2003	Shelby Howard	27	Chevy																																	ATL; DNQ	PHO	CAR	HOM	53rd	220
2007	Mike Skinner	23	Toyota	DAY; DNQ	CAL	LVS	ATL	BRI	MAR	TEX	PHO	TAL	RCH	DAR	CLT	DOV	POC	MCH																						55th	140
2007	Butch Leitzinger	23	Toyota																SON; 28	NHA	DAY	CHI	IND	POC	GLN	MCH	BRI	CAL	RCH	NHA	DOV	KAN								55th	140
2007	Jacques Villeneuve	27	Toyota																														TAL; 21	CLT	MAR	ATL	TEX	PHO; 41	HOM	55th	140

== Busch Series ==
Mark Martin (1988–1990)

BDR began fielding cars in the Busch Series in 1988, when Mark Martin drove thirteen races in the No. 06 Carolina Ford Dealers Ford, posting two top-tens and one win. The team switched to No. 1 the following season with Martin continuing to drive winning the spring race at Bristol. Geoff Bodine ran one race at Martinsville in the fall. Martin won one race at Mytrle Beach in 1990 running twelve races.

Jeff Gordon (1991–1992)

In 1991, the team went full-time with a young Jeff Gordon. Although he did not win, and even failed to qualify for the Goody's 300, he had five top fives, taking Rookie of the Year honors and an 11th place points position. Martin ran in a second car at Hickory in the spring. Baby Ruth became the main sponsor in 1992 with Gordon winning three races including the spring race at Atlanta where Rick Hendrick took notice of Gordon's talents. Gordon and the team were going to move up to the Winston Cup in 1993 but Gordon signed with Hendrick.

Dave Blaney (1998–1999)

In 1998, the team returned full-time fielding the No. 93 Amoco Pontiac piloted by sprint car ace Dave Blaney. Running a limited schedule, Blaney finished in 6th place 3 times. Blaney had an even better 1999 season, winning the pole position several times and finished eighth in points. That same year, Davis fielded a second car for Burton, the No. 02 sponsored by Polaris. He finished in the top-ten in every race and won a pole at Darlington.

Mike Borkowski (2000)

In 2000, Davis opened the No. 20 ride sponsored by AT&T. Rookie Mike Borkowski started the year in the ride, but after the Busch 200, he was released. Dave Blaney and Tom Hubert shared the ride for the year before Scott Wimmer took over in the final part of the season. Burton's team changed to the No. 22 and had two top-five finishes, then closed up.

Scott Wimmer (2000–2003)

Wimmer took over the No. 20, renumbered the No. 23, for 2001, posting eight top-tens and finishing eleventh in points in a Jani-King sponsored car. Siemens became a part-time sponsor in 2002, but the team threatened to shut down to a lack of finances. However, it remained open, and Wimmer won four races in the second half of the season, finishing 3rd in points. For 2003, Stacker 2 came on board as sponsor, and he picked up a win at Pikes Peak.

Kenny Wallace (2004)

At the end of the season, Wimmer moved to Cup, and Kenny Wallace took his place, posting ten top-ten finishes and finishing ninth in points. After Wallace and Stacker 2 left for ppc Racing, Davis sold the equipment to Keith Coleman Racing. The team still remained involved in Busch supplying engines to MacDonald Motorsports.

=== Busch Series Results ===
Year	Team	No.	Make	1	2	3	4	5	6	7	8	9	10	11	12	13	14	15	16	17	18	19	20	21	22	23	24	25	26	27	28	29	30	31	32	33	34	NNSC	Pts
1988	Mark Martin	06	Ford	DAY; 4	HCY	CAR; 1	MAR	DAR; 9	BRI; 23	LNG	NZH	SBO	NSV	CLT; 33	DOV	ROU	LAN	LVL	MYB	OXF	SBO	HCY	LNG	IRP; 7	ROU	BRI; 10	DAR; 38	RCH; 9	DOV; 35	MAR; 18	CLT; 36	CAR; 39	MAR					30th	1211
1989	Mark Martin	1	Ford	DAY; 21	CAR; 31	MAR; 9	HCY	DAR; 2	BRI; 2	NZH; 35	SBO	LAN	NSV	CLT; 39	DOV; 4	ROU	LVL	VOL	MYB; 26	SBO	HCY	DUB	IRP; 2	ROU	BRI; 1^{*}	DAR; 42	RCH; 8^{*}	DOV; 2^{*}	MAR; 17	CLT; 20	CAR; 24	MAR						21st	1832
1990	Mark Martin	1	Ford	DAY	RCH; 35	CAR; 8	MAR	HCY	DAR; 36	BRI; 4	LAN	SBO	NZH	HCY	CLT; 31	DOV; 24	ROU	VOL	MYB; 1	OXF	NHA	SBO	DUB	IRP	ROU	BRI; 6	DAR; 28^{*}	RCH	DOV; 34	MAR	CLT; 16	NHA	CAR; 4^{*}	MAR				31st	1321
1991	Jeff Gordon	1	Ford	DAY; DNQ	RCH; 17	CAR; 24	MAR; 14	VOL; 13	HCY; 15	DAR; 9	BRI; 32	LAN; 2	SBO; 23	NZH; 5	CLT; 18	DOV; 2	ROU; 9	HCY; 2	MYB; 13	GLN; 6	OXF; 29	NHA; 15	SBO; 20	DUB; 12	IRP; 18	ROU; 11	BRI; 3	DAR; 28	RCH; 13	DOV; 8	CLT; 35	NHA; 19	CAR; 37	MAR; 8				11th	3582
1992	Jeff Gordon	1	Ford	DAY; 23	CAR; 9	RCH; 8	ATL; 1*	MAR; 6	DAR; 26	BRI; 5	HCY; 28	LAN; 10*	DUB; 5	NZH; 26	CLT; 1	DOV; 18	ROU; 5	MYB; 5*	GLN; 19	VOL; 18*	NHA; 29	TAL; 11	IRP; 14	ROU; 9	MCH; 19	NHA; 4	BRI; 19*	DAR; 3	RCH; 17	DOV; 12	CLT; 1*	MAR; 14	CAR; 2	HCY; 11				4th	4053
1998	Dave Blaney	93	Pontiac	DAY; 35	CAR; 42	LVS	NSV; 14	DAR; DNQ	BRI; 22	TEX; 34	HCY	TAL; 37	NHA	NZH	CLT; 43	DOV; 36	RCH; 23	PPR	GLN	MLW; 14	MYB	CAL	SBO	IRP; 33	MCH; DNQ	BRI; 29	DAR; 18	RCH; 12	DOV; 6	CLT; 11	GTY; 6	CAR; 20	ATL; 14	HOM; 6				29th	1915
1999	Dave Blaney	93	Pontiac	DAY; 43	CAR; 11	LVS; 20	ATL; 2	DAR; 42	TEX; 8	NSV; 31	BRI; 24	TAL; 14	CAL; 28	NHA; 19	RCH; 10	NZH; 4	CLT; 19	DOV; 8		GLN; 8	MLW; 6	MYB; 13	PPR; 24	GTY; 8	IRP; 38	MCH; 3	BRI; 9	DAR; 2	RCH; 39	DOV; 24	CLT; 20	CAR; 3	MEM; 11	PHO; 19	HOM; 16			7th	3582
1999	Tom Hubert	93	Pontiac																SBO; 18																			7th	3582
2000	Mike Borkowski	20	Pontiac	DAY; 22	CAR; 40	LVS; 40	ATL; 28	DAR; 43	BRI; DNQ		NSV; 42	TAL; 10			NHA; 21																							20th	2564
2000	Dave Blaney	20	Pontiac							TEX; DNQ			CAL; 18	RCH; 22		CLT; 36	DOV; 8											DAR; 9	RCH; 21	DOV; 3	CLT; 3							20th	2564
2000	Tom Hubert	20	Pontiac															SBO; 29	MYB; 21	GLN; 37	MLW; 24	NZH; 36	PPR; 34	GTY; 34	IRP; 38	MCH; 29	BRI; DNQ											20th	2564
2000	Scott Wimmer	20	Pontiac																													CAR; DNQ	MEM; 18	PHO; 19	HOM; 43			20th	2564
2001	Scott Wimmer	23	Pontiac	DAY; 15	CAR; 31	LVS; 11	ATL; 14	DAR; 12	BRI; 29	TEX; 15	NSH; 3	TAL; 42	CAL; 19	RCH; 7	NHA; 17	NZH; 30	CLT; 35	DOV; 7	KEN; 17	MLW; 30	GLN; 23	CHI; 13	GTY; 10	PPR; 20	IRP; 31	MCH; 23	BRI; 6	DAR; 12	RCH; 15	DOV; 12	KAN; 17	CLT; 11	MEM; 8	PHO; 7	CAR; 13	HOM; 4		11th	3773
2002	Scott Wimmer	23	Pontiac	DAY; 13	CAR; 19	LVS; 13	DAR; 34	BRI; 3	TEX; 21	NSH; 4	TAL; 28	CAL; 12	RCH; 8	NHA; 11	NZH; 16	CLT; 18	DOV; 4	NSH; 7	KEN; 5	MLW; 3	DAY; 26	CHI; 13	GTY; 21	PPR; 6	IRP; 3	MCH; 7	BRI; 2	DAR; 7	RCH; 9	DOV; 1	KAN; 24	CLT; 43	MEM; 1	ATL; 13	CAR; 17	PHO; 1	HOM; 1	3rd	4488
2003	Scott Wimmer	23	Chevy	DAY; 12	CAR; 11	LVS; 10	DAR; 28	BRI; 25	TEX; 8	TAL; 38	NSH; 36	CAL; 14	RCH; 5	GTY; 8	NZH; 13	CLT; 19	DOV; 15	NSH; 8	KEN; 5	MLW; 14	DAY; 16	CHI; 15	NHA; 5	PPR; 1	IRP; 12	MCH; 26	BRI; 32	DAR; 18	RCH; 16	DOV; 14	KAN; 7	CLT; 20	MEM; 6	ATL; 14	PHO; 7	CAR; 8	HOM; 39	9th	4059
2004	Kenny Wallace	23	Chevy	DAY; 12	CAR; DNQ	LVS; 25	DAR; 12	BRI; 16	TEX; 37	NSH; 18	TAL; 6	CAL; 9	GTY; 33	RCH; 9	NZH; 9	CLT; 9	DOV; 11	NSH; 18	KEN; 33	MLW; 25	DAY; 30	CHI; 36	NHA; 7	PPR; 14	IRP; 9	MCH; 19	BRI; 14	CAL; 13	RCH; 33	DOV; 20*	KAN; 15	CLT; 9	MEM; 13	ATL; 7	PHO; 22	DAR; 7	HOM; 19	9th	3851

== Craftsman Truck Series ==
=== Truck No. 5 history ===
Mike Skinner (2004–2008)

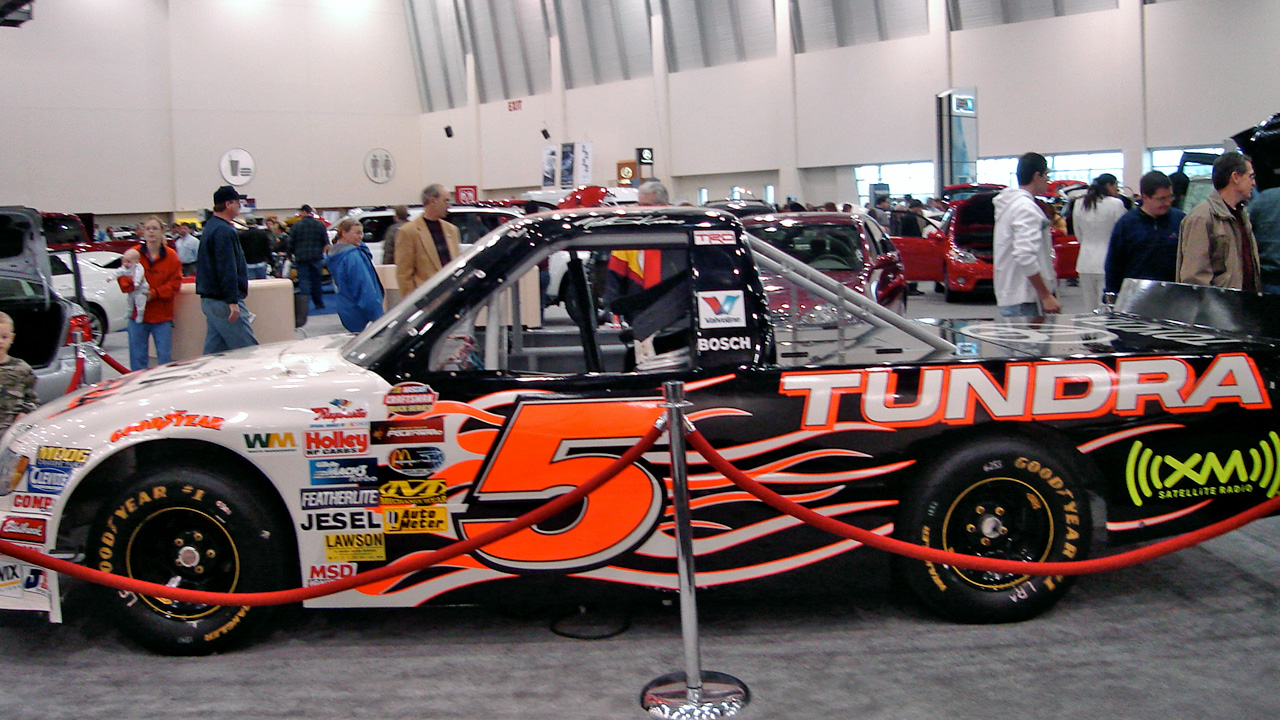
The No. 5 truck.

The No. 5 truck started out in 2004 at Bang! Racing as the No. 42 driven by Mike Skinner. Skinner started the year with two top-fives, but his performance began to decline, and his team was sold to Davis, changing to the No. 5, starting at the Las Vegas 350. He won two poles and had a sixth-place run at the season-ending race at Homestead. In 2005, he won seven poles and two races, at Bristol and Richmond respectively, finishing fifth in points. In 2006, he had thirteen top-tens including a win at Las Vegas, and almost won the 2007 championship before suffering tire failures in the season finale. Skinner was signed to drive for TRT through the 2009 season. However, due to concerns over the economy, the team shut down the entire truck program, with Skinner taking the number 5 with him to Randy Moss Motorsports.

=== Truck No. 22 history ===
Bill Lester (2004–2006)

BDR's original foray into the Truck Series, it debuted in 2004 at the Florida Dodge Dealers 250, where Bill Lester drove it to a sixteenth-place run. He posted just one top-ten that year and finished 22nd in points. The next season, he won two poles (back-to-back at Kansas and Kentucky), had a best finish of fifth and moved up to seventeenth in points. Lester failed to finish in the top-ten during the 2006 season and dropped to twentieth in points.

Tyler Walker and Ryan Matthews (2007)

Tyler Walker began the season driving the renumbered No. 36 truck full-time in 2007, with sponsorship from 360 OTC. Six races into the season, rookie Ryan Mathews replaced Walker after it was learned that Walker was suspended for violating NASCAR's substance abuse policy, and the team had lost its sponsor, 360 OTC (which wanted No. 36). Mathews, in his short season, posted two top tens, one top five, and one pole at Kentucky. Mathews then stepped out of the truck for the debut of 1995 Indianapolis 500 winner and 1997 Formula One Champion Jacques Villeneuve. In preparation for this, the truck was renumbered No. 27, which Villeneuve used in his 1995 CART and Indy 500 championship season, as a tribute to his father Gilles.

Phillip McGilton, Scott Speed and Michael Annett (2008)

The Truck switched back to the No. 22 in 2008 and began the year with Phillip McGilton as the driver, before he was replaced by Scott Speed and Michael Annett. The team had the most successful season 2008, with Speed winning his first NASCAR victory at Dover, and Annett scoring two top-tens in seven races. This team was shut down after the 2008 season due to economic concerns.

==== Truck No. 22 Results ====
Year	Driver	No.	Make	1	2	3	4	5	6	7	8	9	10	11	12	13	14	15	16	17	18	19	20	21	22	23	24	25	NCWTC	Pts	Ref
2004	Bill Lester	22	Toyota	DAY; 16	ATL; 15	MAR; 17	MFD; 30	CLT; 21	DOV; 25	TEX; 12	MEM; 23	MLW; 34	KAN; 28	KEN; 29	GTY; 10	MCH; 18	IRP; 31	NSH; 31	BRI; 14	RCH; 29	NHA; 27	LVS; 24	CAL; 28	TEX; 28	MAR; 14	PHO; 18	DAR; 16	HOM; 24			
2005	Bill Lester	22	Toyota	DAY; 29	CAL; 16	ATL; 21	MAR; 26	GTY; 12	MFD; 18	CLT; 6	DOV; 30	TEX; 22	MCH; 16	MLW; 15	KAN; 5	KEN; 22	MEM; 35	IRP; 18	NSH; 7	BRI; 25	RCH; 14	NHA; 25	LVS; 32	MAR; 32	ATL; 19	TEX; 11	PHO; 21	HOM; 5			
2006	Bill Lester	22	Toyota	DAY; 35	CAL; 15	ATL; 29	MAR; 24	GTY; 30	CLT; DNQ	MFD; 24	DOV; 30	TEX; 22	MCH; 33	MLW; 15	KAN; 23	KEN; 28	MEM; 25	IRP; 14	NSH; 21	BRI; 16	NHA; 35	LVS; 19	TAL; 31	MAR; 12	ATL; 22	TEX; 21	PHO; 20	HOM; 11			
2007	Tyler Walker	36	Toyota	DAY; 31	CAL; 24	ATL; 31	MAR; 8	KAN; 23	CLT; 15																						
2007	Ryan Mathews	36	Toyota							MFD; 18	DOV; 15	TEX; 21	MCH; 16	MLW; 14	MEM; 6																
2007	Ryan Mathews	22	Toyota													KEN; 4	IRP; 25	NSH; 16	BRI; 31	GTW; 18	NHA; 13										
2007	Jacques Villeneuve	27	Toyota																			LVS; 21	TAL; 30	MAR; 32	ATL; 14	TEX; 25	PHO; 19	HOM; 36			
2008	Phillip McGilton	22	Toyota	DAY; 12	CAL; 10	ATL; 16	MAR; 16																								
2008	Scott Speed	22	Toyota					KAN; 8	CLT; 33	MFD; 15	DOV; 1	TEX; 26	MCH; 3						BRI; 3			LVS; 21	TAL; 15	MAR; 7	ATL; 5	TEX; 10	PHO; 14	HOM; 10			
2008	Michael Annett	22	Toyota									TEX; QL^{†}		MLW; 6	MEM; 11	KEN; 2	IRP; 21	NSH; 33		GTW; 24	NHA; 24										
^{†} – Qualified for Scott Speed

=== Truck No. 23 history ===
Shelby Howard (2004)

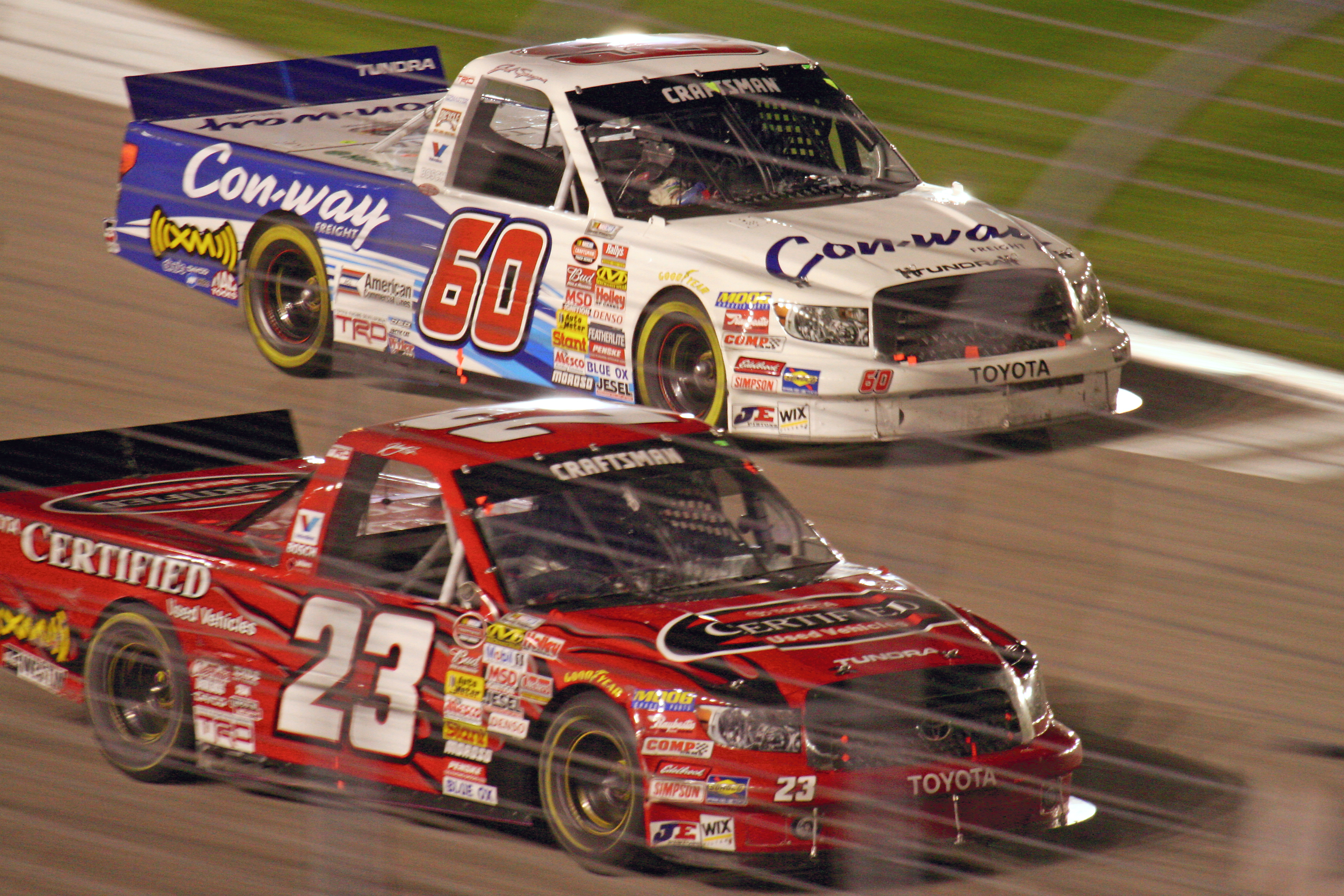
The 23 truck in 2007.

The No. 23 truck began in 2004 when Davis purchased its equipment from Phil Bonifield. The truck was piloted by Shelby Howard. Howard ran eight of the first nine races, with Dave Blaney driving at Dover, before he was released, and Johnny Benson Jr. took over.

Johnny Benson (2004–2008)

Despite running a limited schedule, Benson finished 25th in points. He became the full-time driver in 2005, and had six top-fives en route to a tenth-place points finish. Benson went on to collect five wins during the 2006 season with additional backing from Exide and finished runner-up to Todd Bodine for the championship. 360 OTC sponsored the 23 for ten races during the 2007 season. Benson won four races and finished third in points. In 2008 Benson was considered a title favorite. Benson, crew chief Trip Bruce, and truck chief William (Billy) Hagerthey Jr. won five races that year and held off defending champion Ron Hornaday Jr. to win the 2008 NASCAR Craftsman Truck Series championship, the first ever NASCAR championship for BDR. Before winning the championship, it was announced that Benson would not return in 2009. Both Benson and Trip Bruce have since been named to the No. 1 truck of Red Horse Racing. ARCA RE/MAX Series driver Tayler Malsam was intended to drive this truck for Rookie of the Year Honors, but he later moved to Randy Moss Motorsports with Skinner after the abrupt closure of Bill Davis Racing.

==== Truck No. 23 Results ====
Year	Team	No.	Make	1	2	3	4	5	6	7	8	9	10	11	12	13	14	15	16	17	18	19	20	21	22	23	24	25	NCTC	Pts	Ref
2004	Shelby Howard	23	Toyota	DAY; 29	ATL; 25	MAR; 23	MFD; 23	CLT; 33		TEX; 21	MEM; 24	MLW; 21	KAN	KEN	GTY														19th	2675	
2004	Dave Blaney	23	Toyota						DOV; 6																				19th	2675	
2004	Johnny Benson Jr.	23	Toyota													MCH; 4	IRP; 26	NSH; 6	BRI; 13	RCH; 25	NHA; 3	LVS; 4	CAL; 7	TEX; 2	MAR; 11	PHO; 5	DAR; 6	HOM; 11	19th	2675	
2005	Johnny Benson Jr.	23	Toyota	DAY; 10	CAL; 12	ATL; 11	MAR; 17	GTY; 11	MFD; 23	CLT; 4	DOV; 34	TEX; 2	MCH; 24	MLW; 35	KAN; 28	KEN; 9	MEM; 9	IRP; 16	NSH; 8	BRI; 4	RCH; 13	NHA; 32	LVS; 33	MAR; 15	ATL; 3	TEX; 13	PHO; 3*	HOM; 3			
2006	Johnny Benson Jr.	23	Toyota	DAY; 15	CAL; 6	ATL; 3	MAR; 30	GTY; 5	CLT; 12	MFD; 4	DOV; 6	TEX; 5	MCH; 1	MLW; 1	KAN; 9	KEN; 4	MEM; 32	IRP; 12	NSH; 1	BRI; 4	NHA; 1*	LVS; 4	TAL; 9	MAR; 5	ATL; 29	TEX; 31	PHO; 1	HOM; 26			
2007	Johnny Benson Jr.	23	Toyota	DAY; 2	CAL; 6	ATL; 28	MAR; 10	KAN; 4	CLT; 27	MFD; 5	DOV; 4	TEX; 29	MCH; 9	MLW; 1	MEM; 7	KEN; 14	IRP; 2	NSH; 30	BRI; 1	GTW; 1	NHA; 8	LVS; 2	TAL; 3	MAR; 9	ATL; 3	TEX; 27	PHO; 7	HOM; 1			
2008	Johnny Benson Jr.	23	Toyota	DAY; 3	CAL; 3	ATL; 30	MAR; 25	KAN; 4	CLT; 11	MFD; 8	DOV; 10	TEX; 3	MCH; 2	MLW; 1*	MEM; 33	KEN; 1*	IRP; 1	NSH; 1	BRI; 4	GTW; 3	NHA; 2	LVS; 27	TAL; 11	MAR; 1	ATL; 7	TEX; 3	PHO; 26	HOM; 7			

=== Truck No. 24 history ===
The No. 24 truck entered as a R&D entry for BDR in 2005. Steve Park drove the No. 67 South Padre Island entry in a pair of races towards the end of the year following his release from Orleans Racing. His best finish was 16th at Texas. In 2006, A. J. Allmendinger drove the newly renumbered 24 for three races, posting a fifth-place run at Talladega. ARCA Re/MAX Series driver Phillip McGilton was to make his NASCAR debut in this truck at Homestead before going full-time with the No. 22 team in 2008, however plans were changed as Blaney was put in the No. 22 truck sponsored by Caterpillar. This truck has made only one start, which came at the 2008 Ford 200 with Tayler Malsam driving to a 21st-place finish. This team was also shut down after the 2008 season concluded.

== Controversy ==
=== Fallout with Dodge ===
In 2003, Dodge parent company DaimlerChrysler filed a lawsuit against Bill Davis Racing after they "found the race team to be building (Truck Series) trucks for Toyota," in preparation for entering the Truck Series in 2004. In addition, BDR continued to run Pontiacs in the Busch Series through 2002, and Chevrolets in 2003 and 2004 due to Dodge not giving any manufacturer support in the Busch Series. Bill Davis Racing had built a prototype for Toyota's Truck program to present to NASCAR, which Chrysler viewed as a breach of contract. Dodge proceeded to pull manufacturer support from BDR in October 2003. The team continued to run Dodges through 2006; they stopped running Dodge logos on the cars that year after a District Court judge in Detroit ruled in favor of DaimlerChrysler, requiring Davis to pay $6.5 million to the manufacturer in February 2006. Davis switched to Toyota in the Sprint Cup Series in 2007. Although there was a ruling against the team, Davis and Dodge settled out-of-court in November 2006, with the terms not released.
