= 2001 Chevrolet Monte Carlo 400 =

26th race of the 2001 NASCAR Winston Cup Series

2001 Chevrolet Monte Carlo 400 with the Looney Tunes
Race details
- Race 26 of 36 in the 2001 NASCAR Winston Cup Series
- The 2001 Chevrolet Monte Carlo 400 program cover, featuring several Looney Tunes sponsored cars.
- Date: September 8, 2001
- Official name: 44th Annual Chevrolet Monte Carlo 400 with The Looney Tunes
- Location: Richmond, Virginia, Richmond International Raceway
- Course: Permanent racing facility
- Course length: 0.75 miles (1.21 km)
- Distance: 400 laps, 300 mi (482.803 km)
- Average speed: 95.146 miles per hour (153.123 km/h)

Pole position
| Driver | Jeff Gordon | Hendrick Motorsports |
- Time: 21.617

Most laps led
| Driver | Rusty Wallace | Penske Racing South |
- Laps: 276

Winner
| No. 28 | Ricky Rudd | Robert Yates Racing |

Television in the United States
- Network: TNT
- Announcers: Allen Bestwick, Benny Parsons, Wally Dallenbach Jr.

Radio in the United States
- Radio: Motor Racing Network

The 2001 Chevrolet Monte Carlo 400 with the Looney Tunes was the 28th stock car race of the 2001 NASCAR Winston Cup Series and the 44th iteration of the event. The race was held on Saturday, September 8, 2001, in Richmond, Virginia, at Richmond International Raceway, a 0.75 miles (1.21 km) D-shaped oval. The race took the scheduled 400 laps to complete. In a wild finish, Ricky Rudd, driving for Robert Yates Racing, would battle with Richard Childress Racing driver Kevin Harvick in the final laps of the race. Harvick would send Rudd up on the track with 17 to go, but Rudd was eventually able to save the car. Rudd would then later payback Harvick with 7 to go, moving Harvick to win his 22nd career NASCAR Winston Cup Series victory and his second and final victory of the season. The win was also Robert Yates Racing's 50th victory as an organization. To fill out the podium, Harvick would finish second, and Dale Earnhardt, Inc. driver Dale Earnhardt Jr. would finish third.

== Background ==
The layout of Richmond International Raceway, the venue where the race was at.

Richmond International Raceway (RIR) is a 3/4-mile (1.2 km), D-shaped, asphalt race track located just outside Richmond, Virginia in Henrico County. It hosts the NASCAR Cup Series and Xfinity Series. Known as "America's premier short track", it formerly hosted a NASCAR Camping World Truck Series race, an IndyCar Series race, and two USAC sprint car races.

=== Entry list ===
- (R) denotes rookie driver.

| # | Driver | Team | Make |
|---|---|---|---|
| 1 | Kenny Wallace | Dale Earnhardt, Inc. | Chevrolet |
| 01 | Jason Leffler (R) | Chip Ganassi Racing with Felix Sabates | Dodge |
| 2 | Rusty Wallace | Penske Racing South | Ford |
| 4 | Kevin Lepage | Morgan–McClure Motorsports | Chevrolet |
| 5 | Terry Labonte | Hendrick Motorsports | Chevrolet |
| 6 | Mark Martin | Roush Racing | Ford |
| 7 | Mike Wallace | Ultra Motorsports | Ford |
| 8 | Dale Earnhardt Jr. | Dale Earnhardt, Inc. | Chevrolet |
| 9 | Bill Elliott | Evernham Motorsports | Dodge |
| 10 | Johnny Benson Jr. | MBV Motorsports | Pontiac |
| 11 | Brett Bodine | Brett Bodine Racing | Ford |
| 12 | Jeremy Mayfield | Penske Racing South | Ford |
| 13 | Hermie Sadler | SCORE Motorsports | Chevrolet |
| 14 | Ron Hornaday Jr. (R) | A. J. Foyt Enterprises | Pontiac |
| 15 | Michael Waltrip | Dale Earnhardt, Inc. | Chevrolet |
| 17 | Matt Kenseth | Roush Racing | Ford |
| 18 | Bobby Labonte | Joe Gibbs Racing | Pontiac |
| 19 | Casey Atwood (R) | Evernham Motorsports | Dodge |
| 20 | Tony Stewart | Joe Gibbs Racing | Pontiac |
| 21 | Elliott Sadler | Wood Brothers Racing | Ford |
| 22 | Ward Burton | Bill Davis Racing | Dodge |
| 24 | Jeff Gordon | Hendrick Motorsports | Chevrolet |
| 25 | Jerry Nadeau | Hendrick Motorsports | Chevrolet |
| 26 | Jimmy Spencer | Haas-Carter Motorsports | Ford |
| 27 | Rick Mast | Eel River Racing | Pontiac |
| 28 | Ricky Rudd | Robert Yates Racing | Ford |
| 29 | Kevin Harvick (R) | Richard Childress Racing | Chevrolet |
| 30 | Jeff Green | Richard Childress Racing | Chevrolet |
| 31 | Mike Skinner | Richard Childress Racing | Chevrolet |
| 32 | Ricky Craven | PPI Motorsports | Ford |
| 33 | Joe Nemechek | Andy Petree Racing | Chevrolet |
| 36 | Ken Schrader | MBV Motorsports | Pontiac |
| 40 | Sterling Marlin | Chip Ganassi Racing with Felix Sabates | Dodge |
| 43 | John Andretti | Petty Enterprises | Dodge |
| 44 | Buckshot Jones | Petty Enterprises | Dodge |
| 45 | Kyle Petty | Petty Enterprises | Dodge |
| 55 | Bobby Hamilton | Andy Petree Racing | Chevrolet |
| 66 | Todd Bodine | Haas-Carter Motorsports | Ford |
| 77 | Robert Pressley | Jasper Motorsports | Ford |
| 85 | Carl Long | Mansion Motorsports | Ford |
| 88 | Dale Jarrett | Robert Yates Racing | Ford |
| 90 | Hut Stricklin | Donlavey Racing | Ford |
| 92 | Stacy Compton | Melling Racing | Dodge |
| 93 | Dave Blaney | Bill Davis Racing | Dodge |
| 96 | Andy Houston (R) | PPI Motorsports | Ford |
| 97 | Kurt Busch (R) | Roush Racing | Ford |
| 99 | Jeff Burton | Roush Racing | Ford |
Official entry list

== Practice ==
=== First practice ===
The first practice session was held on Friday, September 7, at 11:30 AM EST. The session would last for two hours. Dale Earnhardt Jr., driving for Dale Earnhardt, Inc., would set the fastest time in the session, with a lap of 21.696 and an average speed of 124.447 miles per hour (200.278 km/h).

| Pos. | # | Driver | Team | Make | Time | Speed |
|---|---|---|---|---|---|---|
| 1 | 8 | Dale Earnhardt Jr. | Dale Earnhardt, Inc. | Chevrolet | 21.696 | 124.447 |
| 2 | 30 | Jeff Green | Richard Childress Racing | Chevrolet | 21.700 | 124.424 |
| 3 | 2 | Rusty Wallace | Penske Racing South | Ford | 21.712 | 124.355 |
Full first practice results

=== Second and final practice ===
The final practice session, sometimes referred to as Happy Hour, was held on Friday, September 7, at 5:45 PM EST. The session would last for one hour and 30 minutes. Jeff Green, driving for Richard Childress Racing, would set the fastest time in the session, with a lap of 22.005 and an average speed of 122.699 miles per hour (197.465 km/h).

| Pos. | # | Driver | Team | Make | Time | Speed |
|---|---|---|---|---|---|---|
| 1 | 30 | Jeff Green | Richard Childress Racing | Chevrolet | 22.005 | 122.699 |
| 2 | 2 | Rusty Wallace | Penske Racing South | Ford | 22.104 | 122.150 |
| 3 | 20 | Tony Stewart | Joe Gibbs Racing | Pontiac | 22.115 | 122.089 |
Full Happy Hour practice results

== Qualifying ==
Qualifying was held on Friday, September 7, at 3:00 PM EST. Each driver would have two laps to set a fastest time; the fastest of the two would count as their official qualifying lap. Positions 1-36 would be decided on time, while positions 37-43 would be based on provisionals. Six spots are awarded by the use of provisionals based on owner's points. The seventh is awarded to a past champion who has not otherwise qualified for the race. If no past champ needs the provisional, the next team in the owner points will be awarded a provisional.

Jeff Gordon, driving for Hendrick Motorsports, would win the pole, setting a time of 21.617 and an average speed of 124.902 miles per hour (201.010 km/h).

Four drivers would fail to qualify: Andy Houston, Hut Stricklin, Hermie Sadler, and Carl Long.

=== Full qualifying results ===
| Pos. | # | Driver | Team | Make | Time | Speed |
|---|---|---|---|---|---|---|
| 1 | 24 | Jeff Gordon | Hendrick Motorsports | Chevrolet | 21.617 | 124.902 |
| 2 | 2 | Rusty Wallace | Penske Racing South | Ford | 21.685 | 124.510 |
| 3 | 40 | Sterling Marlin | Chip Ganassi Racing with Felix Sabates | Dodge | 21.689 | 124.487 |
| 4 | 99 | Jeff Burton | Roush Racing | Ford | 21.770 | 124.024 |
| 5 | 22 | Ward Burton | Bill Davis Racing | Dodge | 21.795 | 123.882 |
| 6 | 18 | Bobby Labonte | Joe Gibbs Racing | Pontiac | 21.797 | 123.870 |
| 7 | 19 | Casey Atwood (R) | Evernham Motorsports | Dodge | 21.806 | 123.819 |
| 8 | 8 | Dale Earnhardt Jr. | Dale Earnhardt, Inc. | Chevrolet | 21.810 | 123.796 |
| 9 | 28 | Ricky Rudd | Robert Yates Racing | Ford | 21.831 | 123.677 |
| 10 | 14 | Ron Hornaday Jr. (R) | A. J. Foyt Enterprises | Pontiac | 21.861 | 123.508 |
| 11 | 33 | Joe Nemechek | Andy Petree Racing | Chevrolet | 21.881 | 123.395 |
| 12 | 66 | Todd Bodine | Haas-Carter Motorsports | Ford | 21.890 | 123.344 |
| 13 | 92 | Stacy Compton | Melling Racing | Dodge | 21.895 | 123.316 |
| 14 | 93 | Dave Blaney | Bill Davis Racing | Dodge | 21.899 | 123.293 |
| 15 | 32 | Ricky Craven | PPI Motorsports | Ford | 21.902 | 123.276 |
| 16 | 88 | Dale Jarrett | Robert Yates Racing | Ford | 21.905 | 123.260 |
| 17 | 36 | Ken Schrader | MB2 Motorsports | Pontiac | 21.908 | 123.243 |
| 18 | 30 | Jeff Green | Richard Childress Racing | Chevrolet | 21.915 | 123.203 |
| 19 | 6 | Mark Martin | Roush Racing | Ford | 21.916 | 123.198 |
| 20 | 43 | John Andretti | Petty Enterprises | Dodge | 21.919 | 123.181 |
| 21 | 31 | Mike Skinner | Richard Childress Racing | Chevrolet | 21.924 | 123.153 |
| 22 | 29 | Kevin Harvick (R) | Richard Childress Racing | Chevrolet | 21.948 | 123.018 |
| 23 | 55 | Bobby Hamilton | Andy Petree Racing | Chevrolet | 21.963 | 122.934 |
| 24 | 77 | Robert Pressley | Jasper Motorsports | Ford | 21.971 | 122.889 |
| 25 | 26 | Jimmy Spencer | Haas-Carter Motorsports | Ford | 21.987 | 122.800 |
| 26 | 5 | Terry Labonte | Hendrick Motorsports | Chevrolet | 21.992 | 122.772 |
| 27 | 10 | Johnny Benson Jr. | MBV Motorsports | Pontiac | 21.993 | 122.766 |
| 28 | 1 | Kenny Wallace | Dale Earnhardt, Inc. | Chevrolet | 22.000 | 122.727 |
| 29 | 7 | Mike Wallace | Ultra Motorsports | Ford | 22.005 | 122.699 |
| 30 | 12 | Jeremy Mayfield | Penske Racing South | Ford | 22.009 | 122.677 |
| 31 | 44 | Buckshot Jones | Petty Enterprises | Dodge | 22.010 | 122.672 |
| 32 | 21 | Elliott Sadler | Wood Brothers Racing | Ford | 22.036 | 122.527 |
| 33 | 20 | Tony Stewart | Joe Gibbs Racing | Pontiac | 22.044 | 122.482 |
| 34 | 27 | Rick Mast | Eel River Racing | Pontiac | 22.048 | 122.460 |
| 35 | 11 | Brett Bodine | Brett Bodine Racing | Ford | 22.067 | 122.355 |
| 36 | 45 | Kyle Petty | Petty Enterprises | Dodge | 22.070 | 122.338 |
Provisionals
| 37 | 9 | Bill Elliott | Evernham Motorsports | Dodge | -* | -* |
| 38 | 17 | Matt Kenseth | Roush Racing | Ford | -* | -* |
| 39 | 25 | Jerry Nadeau | Hendrick Motorsports | Chevrolet | -* | -* |
| 40 | 97 | Kurt Busch (R) | Roush Racing | Ford | -* | -* |
| 41 | 15 | Michael Waltrip | Dale Earnhardt, Inc. | Chevrolet | -* | -* |
| 42 | 01 | Jason Leffler (R) | Chip Ganassi Racing with Felix Sabates | Dodge | -* | -* |
| 43 | 4 | Kevin Lepage | Morgan–McClure Motorsports | Chevrolet | -* | -* |
Failed to qualify
| 44 | 96 | Andy Houston (R) | PPI Motorsports | Ford | 22.116 | 122.084 |
| 45 | 90 | Hut Stricklin | Donlavey Racing | Ford | 22.277 | 121.201 |
| 46 | 13 | Hermie Sadler | SCORE Motorsports | Chevrolet | 22.153 | 121.880 |
| 47 | 85 | Carl Long | Mansion Motorsports | Ford | 22.482 | 120.096 |
Official qualifying results

*Time not available.

== Race results ==
| Fin | St | # | Driver | Team | Make | Laps | Led | Status | Pts | Winnings |
|---|---|---|---|---|---|---|---|---|---|---|
| 1 | 9 | 28 | Ricky Rudd | Robert Yates Racing | Ford | 400 | 88 | running | 180 | $171,992 |
| 2 | 22 | 29 | Kevin Harvick (R) | Richard Childress Racing | Chevrolet | 400 | 12 | running | 175 | $126,417 |
| 3 | 8 | 8 | Dale Earnhardt Jr. | Dale Earnhardt, Inc. | Chevrolet | 400 | 0 | running | 165 | $106,053 |
| 4 | 16 | 88 | Dale Jarrett | Robert Yates Racing | Ford | 400 | 0 | running | 160 | $107,107 |
| 5 | 2 | 2 | Rusty Wallace | Penske Racing South | Ford | 400 | 276 | running | 165 | $100,895 |
| 6 | 6 | 18 | Bobby Labonte | Joe Gibbs Racing | Pontiac | 400 | 0 | running | 150 | $99,732 |
| 7 | 33 | 20 | Tony Stewart | Joe Gibbs Racing | Pontiac | 400 | 0 | running | 146 | $62,205 |
| 8 | 25 | 26 | Jimmy Spencer | Haas-Carter Motorsports | Ford | 400 | 0 | running | 142 | $65,415 |
| 9 | 4 | 99 | Jeff Burton | Roush Racing | Ford | 400 | 0 | running | 138 | $87,501 |
| 10 | 27 | 10 | Johnny Benson Jr. | MBV Motorsports | Pontiac | 400 | 0 | running | 134 | $58,305 |
| 11 | 15 | 32 | Ricky Craven | PPI Motorsports | Ford | 400 | 0 | running | 130 | $43,155 |
| 12 | 5 | 22 | Ward Burton | Bill Davis Racing | Dodge | 400 | 0 | running | 127 | $75,365 |
| 13 | 23 | 55 | Bobby Hamilton | Andy Petree Racing | Chevrolet | 400 | 0 | running | 124 | $49,980 |
| 14 | 39 | 25 | Jerry Nadeau | Hendrick Motorsports | Chevrolet | 400 | 0 | running | 121 | $49,680 |
| 15 | 24 | 77 | Robert Pressley | Jasper Motorsports | Ford | 400 | 0 | running | 118 | $59,975 |
| 16 | 11 | 33 | Joe Nemechek | Andy Petree Racing | Chevrolet | 400 | 0 | running | 115 | $69,125 |
| 17 | 37 | 9 | Bill Elliott | Evernham Motorsports | Dodge | 400 | 0 | running | 112 | $65,278 |
| 18 | 12 | 66 | Todd Bodine | Haas-Carter Motorsports | Ford | 399 | 0 | running | 109 | $40,905 |
| 19 | 19 | 6 | Mark Martin | Roush Racing | Ford | 399 | 0 | running | 106 | $80,931 |
| 20 | 41 | 15 | Michael Waltrip | Dale Earnhardt, Inc. | Chevrolet | 399 | 0 | running | 103 | $49,730 |
| 21 | 28 | 1 | Kenny Wallace | Dale Earnhardt, Inc. | Chevrolet | 399 | 0 | running | 100 | $66,348 |
| 22 | 13 | 92 | Stacy Compton | Melling Racing | Dodge | 399 | 0 | running | 97 | $45,191 |
| 23 | 17 | 36 | Ken Schrader | MB2 Motorsports | Pontiac | 399 | 0 | running | 94 | $51,395 |
| 24 | 40 | 97 | Kurt Busch (R) | Roush Racing | Ford | 399 | 0 | running | 91 | $46,580 |
| 25 | 36 | 45 | Kyle Petty | Petty Enterprises | Dodge | 398 | 0 | running | 88 | $36,130 |
| 26 | 14 | 93 | Dave Blaney | Bill Davis Racing | Dodge | 397 | 0 | running | 85 | $38,205 |
| 27 | 7 | 19 | Casey Atwood (R) | Evernham Motorsports | Dodge | 397 | 0 | running | 82 | $37,980 |
| 28 | 42 | 01 | Jason Leffler (R) | Chip Ganassi Racing with Felix Sabates | Dodge | 396 | 0 | running | 79 | $48,930 |
| 29 | 30 | 12 | Jeremy Mayfield | Penske Racing South | Ford | 394 | 0 | running | 76 | $76,519 |
| 30 | 20 | 43 | John Andretti | Petty Enterprises | Dodge | 389 | 0 | running | 73 | $70,152 |
| 31 | 32 | 21 | Elliott Sadler | Wood Brothers Racing | Ford | 364 | 0 | running | 70 | $52,590 |
| 32 | 3 | 40 | Sterling Marlin | Chip Ganassi Racing with Felix Sabates | Dodge | 351 | 5 | running | 72 | $42,555 |
| 33 | 21 | 31 | Mike Skinner | Richard Childress Racing | Chevrolet | 342 | 0 | crash | 64 | $66,844 |
| 34 | 34 | 27 | Rick Mast | Eel River Racing | Pontiac | 338 | 0 | running | 61 | $34,460 |
| 35 | 38 | 17 | Matt Kenseth | Roush Racing | Ford | 301 | 0 | running | 58 | $42,425 |
| 36 | 1 | 24 | Jeff Gordon | Hendrick Motorsports | Chevrolet | 283 | 18 | running | 60 | $85,817 |
| 37 | 31 | 44 | Buckshot Jones | Petty Enterprises | Dodge | 259 | 0 | running | 52 | $42,355 |
| 38 | 26 | 5 | Terry Labonte | Hendrick Motorsports | Chevrolet | 255 | 0 | crash | 49 | $67,050 |
| 39 | 43 | 4 | Kevin Lepage | Morgan–McClure Motorsports | Chevrolet | 237 | 0 | running | 46 | $34,260 |
| 40 | 18 | 30 | Jeff Green | Richard Childress Racing | Chevrolet | 235 | 0 | crash | 43 | $34,200 |
| 41 | 10 | 14 | Ron Hornaday Jr. (R) | A. J. Foyt Enterprises | Pontiac | 164 | 0 | crash | 40 | $34,165 |
| 42 | 29 | 7 | Mike Wallace | Ultra Motorsports | Ford | 115 | 0 | crash | 37 | $42,130 |
| 43 | 35 | 11 | Brett Bodine | Brett Bodine Racing | Ford | 99 | 1 | overheating | 39 | $34,349 |
Official race results

| Previous race: 2001 Mountain Dew Southern 500 | NASCAR Winston Cup Series; 2001 season | Next race: 2001 MBNA Cal Ripken Jr. 400 |
