= Triune =

Triune may refer to:

- Trinity, the Godhead in Christianity
- Any of the triple deities
- Triune, Tennessee, an unincorporated town in the United States
- Triune, West Virginia, an unincorporated town in the United States
- Triune Peaks, three peaks in Graham Land, Antarctica
- Triune Masonic Temple, St. Paul, Minnesota, United States, on the National Register of Historic Places
- Bostick Female Academy, also known as Triune School, Triune, Tennessee, on the National Register of Historic Places

== See also ==
- Triune brain theory
- Triune Kingdom, a historic term
- Triune Continuum Paradigm
- Triedinstvo (meaning "Triune"), a split CD by Kolovrat, Arya Varta and Kamaedzitca
- Trichotomy (disambiguation)
