= 2001 MBNA Cal Ripken Jr. 400 =

Auto race held at Dover International Speedway in 2001

Race details
- Race 27 of 36 in the 2001 NASCAR Winston Cup Series
- 2001 MBNA Cal Ripken Jr. 400 program cover
- Date: September 23, 2001
- Location: Dover Downs International Speedway
- Course: Permanent racing facility
- Course length: 1 miles (1.6 km)
- Distance: 400 laps, 400 mi (643.737 km)
- Weather: Mild with temperatures of 77 °F (25 °C); wind speeds of 6 miles per hour (9.7 km/h)
- Average speed: 101.559 miles per hour (163.443 km/h)

Pole position
Driver	Dale Jarrett	Robert Yates Racing

Most laps led
Driver	Dale Earnhardt Jr.	Dale Earnhardt, Inc.
- Laps: 193

Winner
No. 8	Dale Earnhardt Jr.	Dale Earnhardt, Inc.

Television in the United States
- Network: NBC
- Announcers: Allen Bestwick, Benny Parsons, Wally Dallenbach Jr.
- Nielsen ratings: 4.5

The 2001 MBNA Cal Ripken Jr. 400 was a NASCAR Winston Cup Series stock car race held on September 23, 2001, at Dover Downs International Speedway. The race was the 27th of the 2001 NASCAR Winston Cup Series season. The race is notable for being the first NASCAR Cup Series race run after the September 11 attacks.

Dale Jarrett of Robert Yates Racing won the pole position, while Dale Earnhardt, Inc.'s Dale Earnhardt Jr. led the most laps with 193 and won the race.

The race was the also first to be run against the National Football League regular season since the signing of the consolidated NASCAR TV contract which began in 2001.

== First race since September 11 ==
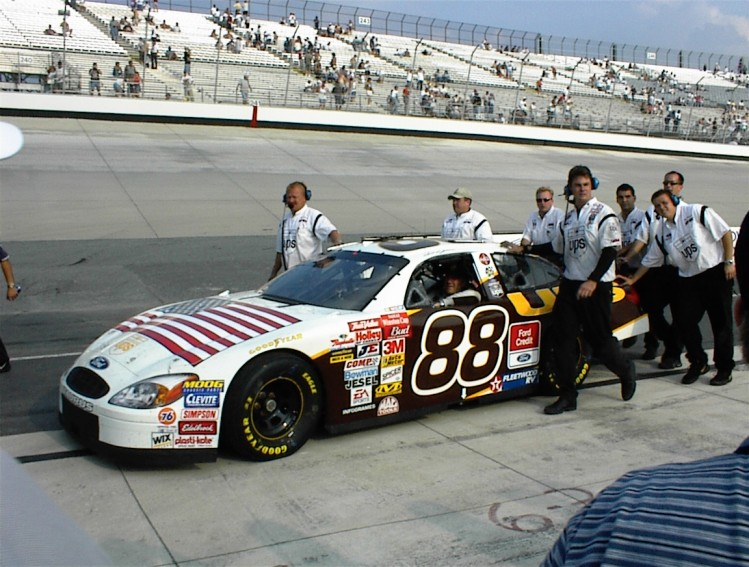
Dale Jarrett won the pole for the race. His car featured an American flag on the hood.

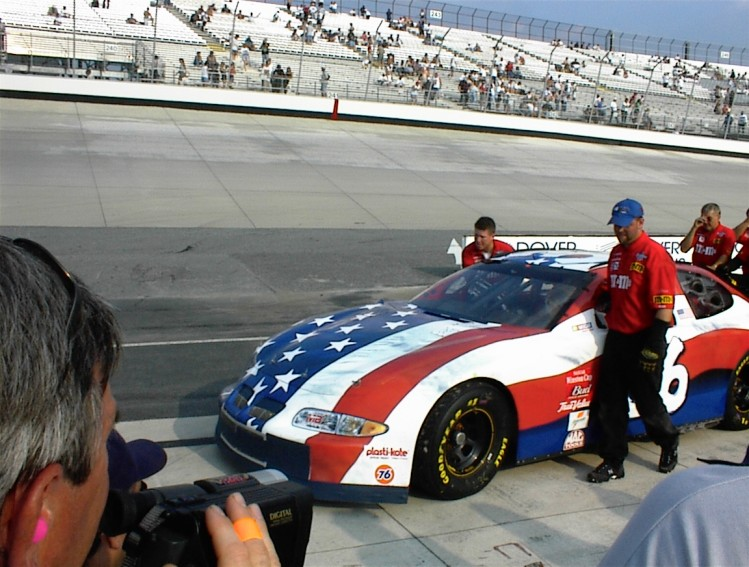
Ken Schrader's all-American flag car

Following the September 11 attacks, NASCAR moved the previously-upcoming New Hampshire 300 at New Hampshire Motor Speedway to late November. The Craftsman Truck Series race at Texas Motor Speedway was postponed to early October. This schedule change made the MBNA Cal Ripken Jr. 400 the first race since the attacks.

To honor those killed in the attacks, fans were given American flags. During pre-race ceremonies, Lee Greenwood sang "God Bless the USA", and Tanya Tucker sang "God Bless America" and the national anthem. Greenwood praised the "raw emotion" felt from the fans, who sang along and chanted "U-S-A!" as he performed the song.

Baseball great Cal Ripken Jr. served as the grand marshal and had the race named for him as he was to play in his final game on the evening of the race in nearby Baltimore, Maryland. However, due to the attacks, his final game was postponed and was not on the same day of the race.

In a sense of patriotism, each car featured American flags. Ken Schrader removed every sponsor and decal from his car and completely painted the car as an American flag, a process that sponsor M&M's would recreate ten years later for Kyle Busch in the 2011 Wonderful Pistachios 400 at Richmond Raceway.

As a security measure, coolers, backpacks, and large bags were banned from the track, though concession prices were lowered in compensation. Volunteers from Dover Air Force Base assisted in scanning and inspecting every spectator entering the track, while Dover encouraged teams to not fly to the track. NASCAR on NBC's helicopters were also prohibited from flying around the track.

In addition, the silent lap that had been observed since the death of Dale Earnhardt was amended to the phrase "For friends and heroes," adding recognition to the victims of the attacks. This would carry over to the rest of the Winston Cup season.

== Entry list ==
Car	Driver	Team	Manufacturer
1	Kenny Wallace	Dale Earnhardt, Inc.	Chevrolet
01	Jason Leffler	Chip Ganassi Racing	Dodge
2	Rusty Wallace	Penske Racing South	Ford
4	Kevin Lepage	Morgan-McClure Motorsports	Pontiac
5	Terry Labonte	Hendrick Motorsports	Chevrolet
6	Mark Martin	Roush Racing	Ford
7	Mike Wallace	Ultra Motorsports	Ford
8	Dale Earnhardt Jr.	Dale Earnhardt, Inc.	Chevrolet
9	Bill Elliott	Evernham Motorsports	Dodge
10	Johnny Benson Jr.	MBV Motorsports	Pontiac
11	Brett Bodine	Brett Bodine Racing	Ford
12	Jeremy Mayfield	Penske Racing South	Ford
13	Hermie Sadler	Peak Performance Motorsports	Chevrolet
14	Ron Hornaday Jr.	A.J. Foyt Racing	Chevrolet
15	Michael Waltrip	Dale Earnhardt, Inc.	Chevrolet
17	Matt Kenseth	Roush Racing	Ford
18	Bobby Labonte	Joe Gibbs Racing	Pontiac
19	Casey Atwood	Evernham Motorsports	Dodge
20	Tony Stewart	Joe Gibbs Racing	Toyota
21	Elliott Sadler	Wood Brothers Racing	Ford
22	Ward Burton	Bill Davis Racing	Pontiac
24	Jeff Gordon	Hendrick Motorsports	Chevrolet
25	Jerry Nadeau	Hendrick Motorsports	Chevrolet
26	Jimmy Spencer	Haas-Carter Motorsports	Ford
27	Rick Mast	Eel River Racing	Pontiac
28	Ricky Rudd	Robert Yates Racing	Ford
29	Kevin Harvick	Richard Childress Racing	Chevrolet
31	Mike Skinner	Richard Childress Racing	Chevrolet
32	Ricky Craven	PPI Motorsports	Chevrolet
33	Joe Nemechek	Andy Petree Racing	Chevrolet
36	Ken Schrader	MB2 Motorsports	Pontiac
40	Sterling Marlin	Chip Ganassi Racing	Dodge
43	John Andretti	Petty Enterprises	Dodge
44	Buckshot Jones	Petty Enterprises	Dodge
45	Kyle Petty	Petty Enterprises	Ford
47	Lance Hooper	Dark Horse Motorsports	Chevrolet
55	Bobby Hamilton	Andy Petree Racing	Chevrolet
66	Todd Bodine	Haas-Carter Motorsports	Ford
71	Dave Marcis	Marcis Auto Racing	Chevrolet
77	Robert Pressley	Jasper Motorsports	Ford
88	Dale Jarrett	Robert Yates Racing	Ford
90	Hut Stricklin	Donlavey Racing	Ford
92	Stacy Compton	Melling Racing	Dodge
93	Dave Blaney	Bill Davis Racing	Dodge
96	Andy Houston	PPI Motorsports	Ford
97	Kurt Busch	Roush Racing	Ford
99	Jeff Burton	Roush Racing	Ford

== Qualifying ==
Dale Jarrett won the pole for the race with a lap time of 23.238 seconds and speed of 154.919 miles per hour (249.318 km/h), his first pole at Dover, while Bobby Labonte qualified second. Rick Mast, Jason Leffler, Lance Hooper, and Dave Marcis failed to qualify.

Pos.	Car	Driver	Manufacturer	Time	Avg. Speed
1	88	Dale Jarrett	Ford	23.238	154.919
2	18	Bobby Labonte	Pontiac	23.245	154.872
3	8	Dale Earnhardt, Jr.	Chevy	23.248	154.852
4	28	Ricky Rudd	Ford	23.257	154.792
5	32	Ricky Craven	Ford	23.321	154.367
6	1	Kenny Wallace	Chevy	23.325	154.341
7	12	Jeremy Mayfield	Ford	23.368	154.057
8	14	Ron Hornaday, Jr.	Pontiac	23.402	153.833
9	66	Todd Bodine	Ford	23.427	153.669
10	9	Bill Elliott	Dodge	23.432	153.636
11	20	Tony Stewart	Pontiac	23.435	153.616
12	92	Stacy Compton	Dodge	23.438	153.597
13	36	Ken Schrader	Pontiac	23.453	153.498
14	29	Kevin Harvick	Chevy	23.461	153.446
15	2	Rusty Wallace	Ford	23.472	153.374
16	33	Joe Nemechek	Chevy	23.482	153.309
17	55	Bobby Hamilton	Chevy	23.511	153.120
18	19	Casey Atwood	Dodge	23.515	153.094
19	21	Elliott Sadler	Ford	23.525	153.029
20	44	Buckshot Jones	Dodge	23.526	153.022
21	45	Kyle Petty	Dodge	23.531	152.990
22	99	Jeff Burton	Ford	23.543	152.912
23	24	Jeff Gordon	Chevy	23.551	152.860
24	4	Kevin Lepage	Chevy	23.554	152.840
25	22	Ward Burton	Dodge	23.575	152.704
26	40	Sterling Marlin	Dodge	23.576	152.698
27	15	Michael Waltrip	Chevy	23.584	152.646
28	77	Robert Pressley	Ford	23.597	152.562
29	43	John Andretti	Dodge	23.633	152.329
30	31	Mike Skinner	Chevy	23.633	152.329
31	90	Hut Stricklin	Ford	23.641	152.278
32	13	Hermie Sadler	Chevy	23.668	152.104
33	5	Terry Labonte	Chevy	23.678	152.040
34	7	Mike Wallace	Ford	23.678	152.040
35	11	Brett Bodine	Ford	23.680	152.027
36	96	Andy Houston	Ford	23.704	151.873
Provisionals
37	10	Johnny Benson, Jr.	Pontiac	0.000	0.000
38	6	Mark Martin	Ford	0.000	0.000
39	26	Jimmy Spencer	Ford	0.000	0.000
40	17	Matt Kenseth	Ford	0.000	0.000
41	25	Jerry Nadeau	Chevy	0.000	0.000
42	93	Dave Blaney	Dodge	0.000	0.000
43	97	Kurt Busch	Ford	0.000	0.000
Failed to qualify
44	27	Rick Mast	Pontiac		
45	01	Jason Leffler	Dodge		
46	47	Lance Hooper	Ford		
47	71	Dave Marcis	Chevrolet		

== Race ==
Bobby Labonte took the lead from Dale Jarrett on the first lap before Jarrett reclaimed it on lap two. Dale Earnhardt Jr. became the leader on lap three and led until the first caution came out for Labonte and Bill Elliott crashing in turn two. Ricky Craven inherited the lead, which he maintained until Earnhardt retook it on lap 41. On lap 56, Jeremy Mayfield hit the turn two wall after his right front tire went down, causing him to lose consciousness. He was able to walk to the infield care center, suffering only a chipped tooth and minor bruises; NASCAR officials inspected Mayfield's car and found a partially torn left lap seat belt, which was damaged in the same fashion as Dale Earnhardt's in the Daytona 500 earlier that year, a major factor in his death. A Goodyear spokesman later stated Mayfield's tire was too damaged to determine what had happened.

Ricky Rudd led during the nine caution laps following Mayfield's wreck, though Earnhardt became the leader for the restart on lap 65, which he would hold for 104 laps. During Earnhardt's run, three more cautions occurred: Brett Bodine spun on lap 71, oil was found on the track on lap 117, and Mark Martin, Johnny Benson Jr., Ron Hornaday Jr., and Ward Burton all crashed on the front stretch on lap 130. Earnhardt lost the lead to Elliott Sadler during caution laps on lap 169, when Andy Houston had an accident in turn two. Tony Stewart also led three laps under the yellow flag until Earnhardt was cycled back into the lead for the green flag on lap 173. On lap 184, Rudd took the lead, holding it for a race-high 161 laps. Between the start and end of Rudd's lead, three yellow flags were waved: Michael Waltrip wrecked on lap 201, Robert Pressley crashed in turn one, and Dave Blaney fell victim to a broken seat belt on lap 268. With 140 laps remaining, Earnhardt had a slow pit stop and was relegated to eighth. He was able to recover from the error and was in third by lap 329. On lap 345, Rudd spun after making contact with Rusty Wallace, bringing out the caution and making Jarrett the new leader until Earnhardt passed him on lap 362. With 11 laps to go, Jarrett also had problems of his own as he spun on the backstretch for the final yellow of the race. Earnhardt held off Jerry Nadeau on the final restart to take the win. During the final lap, the white flag was not waved to signify the refusal to surrender. Nadeau finished second and Rudd in third, while Jeff Gordon and Tony Stewart rounded out the top five.

To honor the victims of the attack, Earnhardt drove a Polish victory lap with a large American flag. The win was described as the third time in 2001 in which Earnhardt had to "carry the emotional burden of the sport", after his father's death at the Daytona 500 and his victorious return to Daytona at the Pepsi 400. In Victory Lane, he stated he would donate $75,000 to relief efforts. Earnhardt added he would pledge $100 a lap and $10,000 for every pit stop under 14 seconds.

== Results ==
Fin	St	#	Driver	Make	Sponsor	Team	Laps	Led	Status	Pts	Winnings
1	3	8	Dale Earnhardt, Jr.	Chevrolet	Budweiser/USA	Dale Earnhardt, Inc.	400	193	running	185	168858
2	41	25	Jerry Nadeau	Chevrolet	UAW-Delphi	Hendrick Motorsports	400	0	running	170	104960
3	4	28	Ricky Rudd	Ford	Texaco, Havoline	Robert Yates Racing	400	169	running	170	117507
4	23	24	Jeff Gordon	Chevrolet	DuPont Automotive	Hendrick Motorsports	400	0	running	160	117832
5	11	20	Tony Stewart	Pontiac	Home Depot/God Bless America	Joe Gibbs Racing	400	3	running	160	89270
6	14	29	Kevin Harvick	Chevrolet	GM Goodwrench/USA	Richard Childress Racing	400	0	running	150	102167
7	16	33	Joe Nemechek	Chevrolet	Oakwood Homes	Andy Petree Racing	400	0	running	146	85735
8	26	40	Sterling Marlin	Dodge	Coors Light	Chip Ganassi Racing	400	0	running	142	73025
9	18	19	Casey Atwood	Dodge	Dodge Dealers, UAW	Evernham Motorsports	400	0	running	138	53565
10	17	55	Bobby Hamilton	Chevrolet	USA/Square D	Andy Petree Racing	400	0	running	134	66765
11	15	2	Rusty Wallace	Ford	Miller Lite/USA	Penske Racing South	400	0	running	130	92305
12	1	88	Dale Jarrett	Ford	UPS/USA	Robert Yates Racing	400	18	running	132	98142
13	39	26	Jimmy Spencer	Ford	Kmart School Spirit/God Bless America	Haas-Carter Motorsports	400	0	running	124	65585
14	19	21	Elliott Sadler	Ford	Motorcraft/USA	Wood Brothers Racing	400	1	running	126	73576
15	9	66	Todd Bodine	Ford	Kmart Blue Light Special	Haas-Carter Motorsports	399	0	running	118	51665
16	24	4	Kevin Lepage	Chevrolet	Kodak	Morgan-McClure Motorsports	399	0	running	115	53655
17	33	5	Terry Labonte	Chevrolet	Kellogg's/USA	Hendrick Motorsports	398	0	running	112	81095
18	13	36	Ken Schrader	Pontiac	American Red Cross, 1-800-HELP-NOW	MB2 Motorsports	398	0	running	109	59125
19	29	43	John Andretti	Dodge	Cheerios	Petty Enterprises	398	0	running	106	82792
20	30	31	Mike Skinner	Chevrolet	Lowe's	Richard Childress Racing	398	0	running	103	83939
21	22	99	Jeff Burton	Ford	Citgo Supergard/USA	Roush Racing	398	0	running	100	90111
22	6	1	Kenny Wallace	Chevrolet	Pennzoil	Dale Earnhardt, Inc.	397	0	running	97	73358
23	34	7	Mike Wallace	Ford	NationsRent	Ultra Motorsports	396	0	running	94	54865
24	12	92	Stacy Compton	Dodge	Kodiak/God Bless America	Melling Racing	396	0	running	91	46615
25	31	90	Hut Stricklin	Ford	Hills Brothers Coffee	Donlavey Racing	396	0	running	88	44340
26	5	32	Ricky Craven	Ford	Tide	PPI Motorsports	395	15	running	90	56290
27	32	13	Hermie Sadler	Chevrolet	Little Trees	Peak Performance Motorsports	394	0	running		43140
28	35	11	Brett Bodine	Ford	Ralph's, Red Cell Batteries	Brett Bodine Racing	391	0	suspension	79	45465
29	40	17	Matt Kenseth	Ford	DeWalt New Products/USA	Roush Racing	390	0	running	76	50815
30	10	9	Bill Elliott	Dodge	Dodge Dealers, UAW	Evernham Motorsports	383	0	running	73	67888
31	37	10	Johnny Benson, Jr.	Pontiac	Valvoline	MBV Motorsports	317	0	running	70	50490
32	38	6	Mark Martin	Ford	Viagra, Pfizer	Roush Racing	314	0	running	67	86681
33	25	22	Ward Burton	Dodge	Caterpillar/USA	Bill Davis Racing	304	0	crash	64	75315
34	8	14	Ron Hornaday, Jr.	Pontiac	Conseco	A.J. Foyt Racing	268	0	crash	61	42005
35	42	93	Dave Blaney	Dodge	American Red Cross, Amoco, 1-800-HELP-NOW	Bill Davis Racing	266	0	crash	58	41855
36	2	18	Bobby Labonte	Pontiac	Interstate Batteries, MBNA, Cal Ripken, Jr.	Joe Gibbs Racing	258	1	running	60	94152
37	28	77	Robert Pressley	Ford	Forever in our Hearts, United We Stand	Jasper Motorsports	228	0	crash	52	49600
38	20	44	Buckshot Jones	Dodge	Georgia-Pacific	Petty Enterprises	203	0	engine	49	49475
39	27	15	Michael Waltrip	Chevrolet	NAPA Auto Parts/God Bless America	Dale Earnhardt, Inc.	199	0	crash	46	51350
40	36	96	Andy Houston	Ford	McDonald's	PPI Motorsports	165	0	crash	43	41200
41	43	97	Kurt Busch	Ford	Sharpie, Rubbermaid, USA	Roush Racing	115	0	engine	40	49075
42	7	12	Jeremy Mayfield	Ford	Mobil 1	Penske Racing South	54	0	crash	37	80234
43	21	45	Kyle Petty	Dodge	Sprint	Petty Enterprises	13	0	engine	34	41076
Failed to qualify
44		27	Rick Mast	Pontiac	Duke's Mayonnaise / Sauer's	Eel River Racing					
45		01	Jason Leffler	Dodge	Cingular Wireless	Chip Ganassi Racing					
46		47	Lance Hooper	Ford	J.J. Baker Custom Homes	Dark Horse Motorsports					
47		71	Dave Marcis	Chevrolet	Team Realtree	Marcis Auto Racing					

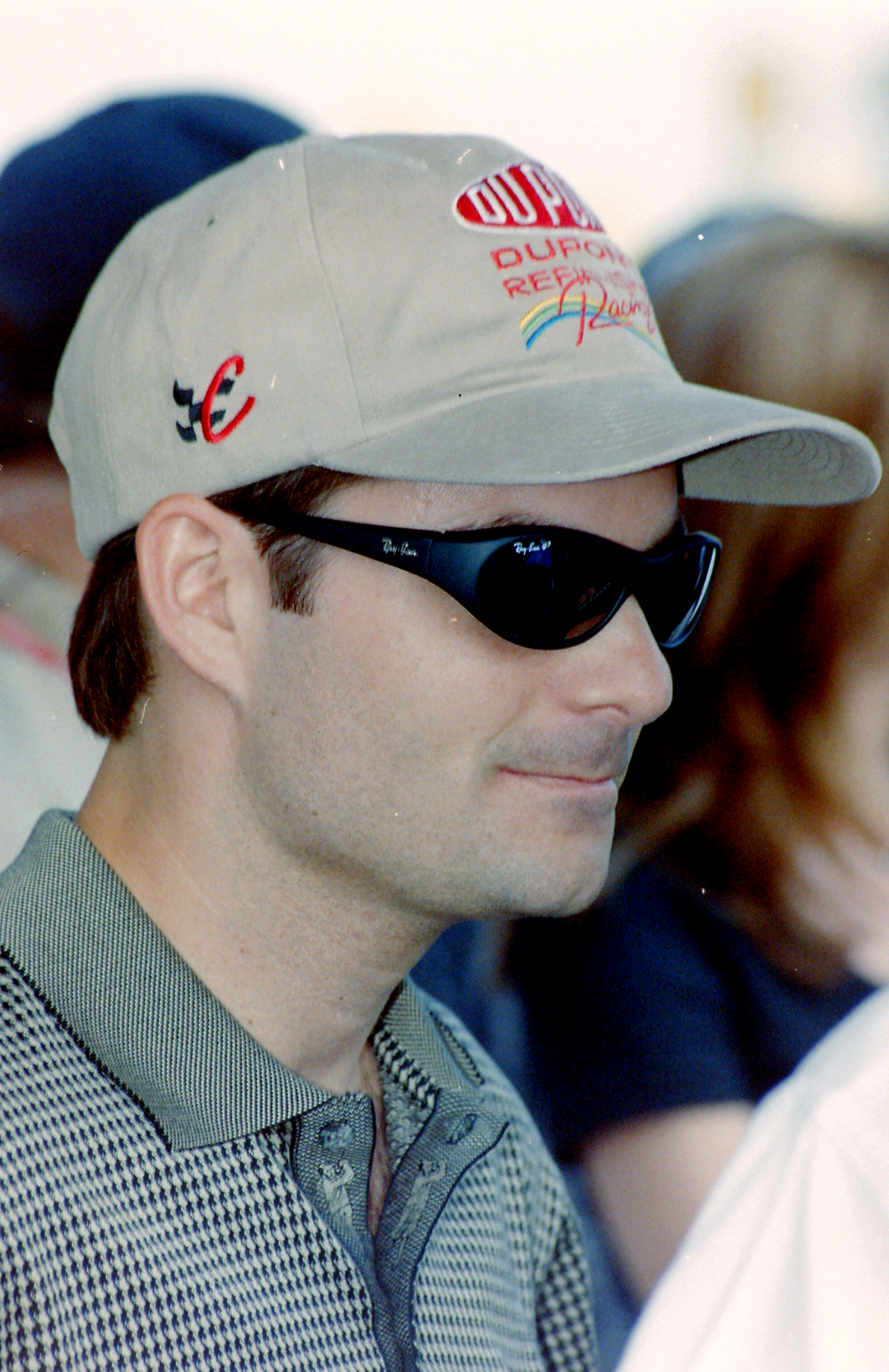
Jeff Gordon led the points standings after the race.

== Standings after the race ==
Pos	Driver	Points	Differential
1	Jeff Gordon	3928	0
2	Ricky Rudd	3716	-212
3 ▲	Tony Stewart	3521	-407
4 ▼	Dale Jarrett	3507	-421
5	Sterling Marlin	3444	-484
6 ▲	Dale Earnhardt Jr.	3429	-499
7 ▲	Kevin Harvick	3380	-548
8 ▲	Rusty Wallace	3355	-573
9 ▼	Bobby Labonte	3327	-601
10	Johnny Benson Jr.	3168	-760

Previous race: 2001 Chevrolet Monte Carlo 400	Winston Cup Series; 2001 season	Next race: 2001 Protection One 400
