= Phoenix 150 =

Phoenix 150 can refer to two races:

- Craftsman 150, NASCAR Craftsman Truck Series race at Phoenix Raceway
- General Tire 150, ARCA Menards Series/ARCA Menards Series West combination race at Phoenix Raceway
