= Triadic =

Triadic may refer to:

- Triad (music)
- Triadic patent, a series of corresponding patents
- Triadic reciprocal causation, a concept in social psychology
- Triadic relation, a mathematical concept
- p-adic number, where p=3, a mathematical concept
- Triadic System in Psychiatry

== See also ==
- Tertian
