= Tripartite =

Tripartite means composed of or split into three parts, or refers to three parties. Specifically, it may also refer to any of the following:

== Education ==
- Tripartite system (United Kingdom), a system of secondary education in England, Wales, and Northern Ireland until the 1970s
- The tripartite system of secondary education in Germany

== Politics ==
- Tripartite system (politics), the separation of political power among a legislature, an executive, and a judiciary
- Tripartite classification of authority, Max Weber's typology of legitimate political authority
- Tripartism, or tripartite consultations, between representatives of the government, workers, and employers
- Tripartite Alliance, a 1990s political alliance in South Africa
- Tripartisme, the three-party coalition government in France after World War II
- Trialism in Austria-Hungary, a political movement that aimed to create a Croatian state equal in status to Austria and Hungary

=== Tripartite agreements ===
- Tripartite Agreement (Horn of Africa), a 2018 cooperation agreement between Eritrea, Ethiopia and Somalia
- Tripartite Agreement of 1936, an international monetary agreement entered into by the United States, France, and Great Britain to stabilize their nations' currencies
- Tripartite Pact between the Axis powers of World War II
- Britain–India–Nepal Tripartite Agreement, signed in 1947 concerning the rights of Gurkhas in military service
- Tripartite Declaration of 1950, signed by the United States, Britain, and France to guarantee the territorial status quo determined by Arab–Israeli armistice agreements
- Madrid Accords, signed by Spain, Morocco, and Mauritania in 1975 to end Spanish presence in the territory of Spanish Sahara
- The Tripartite Accord (Lebanon), signed on 28 December 1985 between three factions to end the Lebanese Civil War
- The Tripartite Accord (1988), signed between Cuba, Angola and South Africa on 22 December 1988 to end the Angolan Civil War
- Tripartite Struggle, between the Pratihara, Rashtrakuta and Pala Empires, centered at the Kannauj Triangle
- Tripartite Convention, an 1899 convention between the US, UK, and Germany that partitioned the Samoan islands
- Tripartite Indenture, an agreement made in February 1405 to divide up England

== Religion ==
- Tripartite view in Christian theology, which holds that man is a composite of three distinct components: body, soul and spirit
- Tripartite Tractate, a third or mid-fourth century Gnostic work found in the Nag Hammadi library
- Historiae Ecclesiasticae Tripartitae Epitome, a medieval church history book, also known as Tripartite History

== Other ==
- 3 (number)
- Tripartite motto, or hendiatris, a figure of speech
- Tripartite alignment in linguistics
- Tripartite symbiosis in ecology
- A tripartite contract or agreement; between three parties
- Tripartite Bridge, Saint Petersburg, Russia
- Tripartite-class minehunter, a ship
- The tripartite periodization of history into ancient, Middle Ages and modern; see Middle Ages § Terminology and periodisation
- The European Tripartite Programme, a trilingual engineering formation

== See also ==
- Trichotomy (disambiguation)
