= Trichotomy =

A trichotomy can refer to:

- Law of trichotomy, a mathematical law that every real number is either positive, negative, or zero
  - Trichotomy theorem, in finite group theory
- Trichotomy (jazz trio), Australian jazz band, collaborators with Danny Widdicombe on a 2019 album
- Trichotomy (philosophy), series of three terms used by various thinkers
- Trichotomy (speciation), three groups from a common ancestor, where it is unclear or unknown in what chronological order the three groups split
- Trichotomous or 3-forked branching in botany
- Trichotomism, a term for the tripartite view in Christian anthropology

== See also ==
- Tripartite (disambiguation)
- Triune (disambiguation)
