= Triad High School =

Triad High School may refer to:

- Triad High School (Illinois)
- Triad High School (North Lewisburg, Ohio)
- Triad School, Klamath Falls, Oregon
