= 2007 Sylvania 300 =

Race details
- Race 27 of 36 in the 2007 NASCAR Nextel Cup Series season
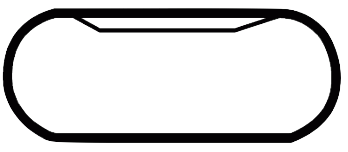
- Layout of New Hampshire Motor Speedway
- Date: September 16, 2007
- Official name: Sylvania 300
- Location: New Hampshire International Speedway, Loudon, New Hampshire
- Course: Permanent racing facility
- Course length: 1.702 km (1.058 miles)
- Distance: 300 laps, 317.4 mi (510.805 km)
- Weather: Chilly with temperatures up to 66.9 °F (19.4 °C); wind speeds up to 4.1 miles per hour (6.6 km/h)
- Average speed: 110.475 miles per hour (177.792 km/h)

Pole position
Driver	Clint Bowyer	Richard Childress Racing
- Time: 29.206

Most laps led
Driver	Clint Bowyer	Richard Childress Racing
- Laps: 222

Winner
No. 07	Clint Bowyer	Richard Childress Racing

Television in the United States
- Network: ABC
- Announcers: Jerry Punch, Rusty Wallace and Andy Petree

The 2007 Sylvania 300 was the 27th race of the 2007 NASCAR Nextel Cup season and the first of the ten-race 2007 Chase for the Nextel Cup championship series.

This racing event was run on Sunday, September 16, 2007, at New Hampshire International Speedway in Loudon, New Hampshire, and was the twelfth race to use the Car of Tomorrow template that would be used full-time starting in 2008.

== Pre-race news ==
- Ken Schrader returns to the #21 Wood Brothers/JTG Racing Ford Fusion.

== Qualifying ==
2007 Chase driver Clint Bowyer of Richard Childress Racing, with a speed of 130.412 mph, grabbed his second career pole. Fellow Chase newcomer Martin Truex Jr. will start alongside him.

Failed to Qualify: Dale Jarrett (#44), Sam Hornish Jr. (#06), Jeremy Mayfield (#36), Michael Waltrip (#55), Kevin Lepage (#37), Boris Said (#98).*

- — Note: The #49 car of John Andretti failed a test in the post-qualifying inspection. As a result, his time, which would have locked him in the race, was disqualified, allowing Said to get into the race.

== Race ==
For Clint Bowyer, he would enter the Chase as the only driver without a victory. That all changed on Sunday when Bowyer and the 07 team flat out crushed the field, leading 222 of 300 laps en route to his first career victory. In the process, he leaped from 12th place in the Chase to fourth with the victory. Jeff Gordon finished second, followed by Tony Stewart. Jimmie Johnson retained the lead on Jeff Gordon in the Chase on more wins (six to four).

For the first time since the 1996 Tyson Holly Farms 400 at North Wilkesboro Speedway, the entire starting field finished a NASCAR Cup Series race. This was only the fourth time in NASCAR history that this has happened; the 1959 200-lap race at the Music City Motorplex where all 12 starting cars finished, two consecutive Tyson Holly Farm 400 races (1995–96) at North Wilkesboro Speedway where all 36 cars starting finished; and the 2007 Sylvania 300 where all 43 starters finished. This 2007 Sylvania 300 does mark the first race in NASCAR's modern era where all cars in a 43-driver field finished.

=== Finishing order ===
Top Ten Results
Pos.	No.	Driver	Car	Team
1.	#07	Clint Bowyer	Chevrolet	Richard Childress Racing
2.	#24	Jeff Gordon	Chevrolet	Hendrick Motorsports
3.	#20	Tony Stewart	Chevrolet	Joe Gibbs Racing
4.	#5	Kyle Busch	Chevrolet	Hendrick Motorsports
5.	#1	Martin Truex Jr.	Chevrolet	Dale Earnhardt Incorporated
6.	#48	Jimmie Johnson	Chevrolet	Hendrick Motorsports
7.	#17	Matt Kenseth	Ford	Roush Fenway Racing
8.	#25	Casey Mears	Chevrolet	Hendrick Motorsports
9.	#12	Ryan Newman	Dodge	Penske Racing
10.	#18	J. J. Yeley	Chevrolet	Joe Gibbs Racing

*Bold italics indicates drivers in the Chase.

Previous race: 2007 Chevy Rock & Roll 400	Nextel Cup Series; 2007 season	Next race: 2007 Dodge Dealers 400
