= Triad Securities =

- Type: Private
- Industry: Finance
- Founded: 1976
- Headquarters: New York City, New York, U.S.
- Key people: Richard Schultz (Founder)
- Services: Prime Brokerage; U.S. and Intl. Execution; New Issue Service
- Website: www.triadsecurities.com

Triad Securities Corp. was founded in 1976 as a full-service agency only discount brokerage firm. Triad’s products and services comprise three categories: prime brokerage, the New Issue Service, and U.S. and international equity and fixed income execution.

== History ==
Triad Securities Corp. was founded as a discount brokerage firm in July 1976 by Richard Schultz. Schultz navigated Triad Securities through the stock market crisis of 1987, as well as the Great Recession of 2008. Schultz, now deceased, had gained substantial experience working in brokerage firms including EF Hutton, Bear Stearns, Weisenberg, Weis Voison & Co., and Muriel Seibert; he was also President of Ladenberg Thalmann prior to founding Triad Securities. Triad Securities Corp. has been providing prime brokerage services to its global clients since 1994.

In 2016, former JP Morgan executive Tom Landsberger was hired as director of prime brokerage sales.

In 2019, the company launched its Prime Brokerage mobile app, Triade Mobile, which allows customers to access their entire financial profile.

== Operations ==
Triad Securities Corp. continues to operate through its Wall Street headquarters at 111 Broadway in New York City. Triad is registered with the U.S. Securities and Exchange Commission (SEC), is a member of FINRA (Financial Industry Regulatory Authority), and a member of SIPC (Securities Investor Protection Corporation).
