= 2007 Chevy Rock & Roll 400 =

Race details
- Race 26 of 36 in the 2007 NASCAR Nextel Cup Series season
- Richmond International Speedway
- Date: September 8, 2007
- Official name: Chevy Rock & Roll 400
- Location: Richmond International Raceway, Richmond, Virginia
- Course: Permanent racing facility
- Course length: 1.207 km (0.75 miles)
- Distance: 400 laps, 300 mi (482.803 km)
- Weather: Temperatures reaching as low as 64.9 °F (18.3 °C); wind speeds up to 8.9 miles per hour (14.3 km/h)
- Average speed: 91.813 miles per hour (147.759 km/h)

Pole position
Driver	Jimmie Johnson	Hendrick Motorsports
- Time: 21.378

Most laps led
Driver	Jeff Gordon	Hendrick Motorsports
- Laps: 191

Winner
No. 48	Jimmie Johnson	Hendrick Motorsports

Television in the United States
- Network: ABC
- Announcers: Jerry Punch, Andy Petree and Rusty Wallace

The 2007 Chevy Rock & Roll 400 was the twenty-sixth and final "regular season" race in the 2007 NASCAR Nextel Cup Series. The race was run on Saturday night, September 8, 2007 at Richmond International Raceway in Henrico County, Virginia, just outside Virginia's state capital. The race was the eleventh to use NASCAR's Car of Tomorrow template, and also the first race to be telecast on ABC since the 2000 Brickyard 400.

Following the race, the top twelve drivers in the point standings entered the Chase for the NEXTEL Cup, and all drivers had their points reset to 5,000 points, with a ten-point bonus for each race they have won in the prior 26 races.

== In the Chase ==
Through September 2, these drivers have clinched a spot in the "post-season:"

1. Jeff Gordon (#24)
2. Denny Hamlin (#11)
3. Matt Kenseth (#17)
4. Carl Edwards (#99)
5. Tony Stewart (#20)
6. Jimmie Johnson (#48)
7. Jeff Burton (#31)
8. Kyle Busch (#5)

The following drivers clinched a spot in the chase by taking the green flag for this race:

- Clint Bowyer (#07 Chevrolet)
- Martin Truex Jr. (#1 Chevrolet)

The remaining spots were decided as well. Kurt Busch needed to finish 36th or better without leading a lap or 39th or better when leading a lap while Kevin Harvick needed to finish 32nd or better without leading a lap or 34th or better while leading a lap (worth five bonus points) to lock himself in. Dale Earnhardt Jr. needed help for a case of bad luck from either Kurt Busch or Harvick in order to make the Chase. Hypothetically, had the Chase started with this race, Johnson would have had a ten-point lead over Jeff Gordon, with Bowyer in last place, as he has not been to Victory Lane in his career.

== Pre-race news ==
- Ricky Rudd missed this race due to a shoulder injury suffered in an accident during the Sharp AQUOS 500 on Sunday (September 2). Kenny Wallace replaced the native Virginian in the Yates/Newman/Haas/Lanigan Racing Ford, the first time in Rudd's career that he has missed a race due to injury.
- David Stremme will not be back in the Chip Ganassi Racing #40 Dodge for the 2008 season. Dario Franchitti, winner of the 2007 Indianapolis 500, has been mentioned as a replacement.

== Qualifying ==
Going out early, Jimmie Johnson earned his 10th career pole award. Hendrick Motorsports teammate Jeff Gordon will join him on the outside pole, with soon to be ex-teammate Kyle Busch in third. Of note, defending winner Kevin Harvick and Kurt Busch, both drivers "on the bubble" to make the chase, started alongside each other in row 7.

Failed to Qualify: #55-Michael Waltrip #36-Jeremy Mayfield #4-Ward Burton #37-Kevin Lepage

== Race ==
Jimmie Johnson took the race and the top seeding in the Chase by winning his season-high sixth race of the season, leading 104 laps. Tony Stewart finished second while David Ragan completed the "podium" with a then career best third. Jeff Gordon finished fourth and Johnny Sauter had his career best finish of fifth. The final Chase spots went to Kurt Busch and Kevin Harvick while in a symbolic moment in his season, Dale Earnhardt Jr. was knocked out of the chase when John Andretti blew an engine on lap 344, and then the race with six laps to go when his engine blew up, resulting in his sixth DNF of the year.

== Points changes ==
Jeff Gordon left the track with a 312-point lead on second-place Tony Stewart. However, points were reset after the race, with each qualifying driver receiving a base score of 5000 points. Additional points were awarded on the basis of 10 per driver win. As a result, Gordon (four wins) dropped to second behind Johnson.

Rank	Driver	Pre-Chase
1	Jimmie Johnson	4
2	Jeff Gordon	1
3	Tony Stewart	2
4	Carl Edwards	6
5	Kurt Busch	10
6	Denny Hamlin	3
7	Martin Truex Jr.	11
8	Matt Kenseth	5
9	Kyle Busch	8
10	Jeff Burton	7
11	Kevin Harvick	12
12	Clint Bowyer	9

== Results ==
Top Ten Results:

Pos.	No.	Driver	Car	Team
1	#48	Jimmie Johnson	Chevrolet	Hendrick Motorsports
2	#20	Tony Stewart	Chevrolet	Joe Gibbs Racing
3	#6	David Ragan (R)	Ford	Roush Fenway Racing
4	#24	Jeff Gordon	Chevrolet	Hendrick Motorsports
5	#70	Johnny Sauter	Chevrolet	Haas CNC Racing
6	#11	Denny Hamlin	Chevrolet	Joe Gibbs Racing
7	#29	Kevin Harvick	Chevrolet	Richard Childress Racing
8	#9	Kasey Kahne	Dodge	Gillett Evernham Motorsports
9	#2	Kurt Busch	Dodge	Penske Racing
10	#18	J. J. Yeley	Chevrolet	Joe Gibbs Racing

Previous race: 2007 Sharp AQUOS 500	Nextel Cup Series; 2007 season	Next race: 2007 Sylvania 300
