= 2001 Mountain Dew Southern 500 =

Race details
- Race 25 of 36 in the 2001 NASCAR Winston Cup Series
- 2001 Southern 500 program cover
- Date: September 2, 2001
- Official name: Mountain Dew Southern 500
- Location: Darlington Raceway, Darlington County, South Carolina
- Course: Permanent racing facility
- Course length: 1.366 miles (2.198 km)
- Distance: 367 laps, 501.322 mi (806.800 km)
- Weather: Temperatures hovering around 82.4 °F (28.0 °C); wind speeds reaching up to 10.2 miles per hour (16.4 km/h)
- Average speed: 122.773 miles per hour (197.584 km/h)

Pole position
Driver	Kurt Busch	Roush Racing
- Time: 29.263

Most laps led
Driver	Jeff Gordon	Hendrick Motorsports
- Laps: 138

Winner
No. 22	Ward Burton	Bill Davis Racing

Television in the United States
- Network: NBC
- Announcers: Allen Bestwick, Benny Parsons and Wally Dallenbach Jr.

The 2001 Mountain Dew Southern 500, the 52nd running of the event, was a NASCAR Winston Cup Series race held on September 2, 2001 at Darlington Raceway in Darlington, South Carolina. Contested over 367 laps on the 1.366-mile (2.198-kilometre) speedway, it was the 25th race of the 2001 NASCAR Winston Cup Series season. Ward Burton of Bill Davis Racing won the race.

== Background ==
Darlington Raceway, nicknamed by many NASCAR fans and drivers as "The Lady in Black" or "The Track Too Tough to Tame" and advertised as a "NASCAR Tradition", is a race track built for NASCAR racing located near Darlington, South Carolina. It is of a unique, somewhat egg-shaped design, an oval with the ends of very different configurations, a condition which supposedly arose from the proximity of one end of the track to a minnow pond the owner refused to relocate. This situation makes it very challenging for the crews to set up their cars' handling in a way that will be effective at both ends.

The track, Darlington Raceway, is a four-turn, 1.366-mile (2.198-kilometre) oval. The track's first two turns are banked at twenty-five degrees, while the final two turns are banked two degrees lower at twenty-three degrees.

== Entry list ==
#	Driver	Team	Make
1	Kenny Wallace (Note: Kenny Wallace replaced Steve Park as a result of injuries suffered by Park in the supporting South Carolina 200 Busch Series race held the day prior.)	Dale Earnhardt, Inc.	Chevrolet
01	Jason Leffler	Chip Ganassi Racing	Dodge
2	Rusty Wallace	Penske Racing South	Ford
4	Kevin Lepage	Morgan–McClure Motorsports	Pontiac
5	Terry Labonte	Hendrick Motorsports	Chevrolet
6	Mark Martin	Roush Racing	Ford
7	Mike Wallace	Ultra Motorsports	Ford
8	Dale Earnhardt Jr.	Dale Earnhardt, Inc.	Chevrolet
9	Bill Elliott	Evernham Motorsports	Dodge
10	Johnny Benson Jr.	MBV Motorsports	Pontiac
11	Brett Bodine	Brett Bodine Racing	Ford
12	Jeremy Mayfield	Penske Racing South	Ford
14	Ron Hornaday Jr.	A.J. Foyt Racing	Chevrolet
15	Michael Waltrip	Dale Earnhardt, Inc.	Chevrolet
17	Matt Kenseth	Roush Racing	Ford
18	Bobby Labonte	Joe Gibbs Racing	Pontiac
19	Casey Atwood	Evernham Motorsports	Dodge
20	Tony Stewart	Joe Gibbs Racing	Toyota
21	Elliott Sadler	Wood Brothers Racing	Ford
22	Ward Burton	Bill Davis Racing	Pontiac
24	Jeff Gordon	Hendrick Motorsports	Chevrolet
25	Jerry Nadeau	Hendrick Motorsports	Chevrolet
26	Jimmy Spencer	Haas-Carter Motorsports	Ford
27	Rick Mast	Eel River Racing	Pontiac
28	Ricky Rudd	Robert Yates Racing	Ford
29	Kevin Harvick	Richard Childress Racing	Chevrolet
31	Mike Skinner	Richard Childress Racing	Chevrolet
32	Ricky Craven	PPI Motorsports	Chevrolet
33	Joe Nemechek	Andy Petree Racing	Chevrolet
36	Ken Schrader	MBV Motorsports	Pontiac
40	Sterling Marlin	Chip Ganassi Racing	Dodge
43	John Andretti	Petty Enterprises	Dodge
44	Buckshot Jones	Petty Enterprises	Dodge
45	Kyle Petty	Petty Enterprises	Ford
55	Bobby Hamilton	Andy Petree Racing	Chevrolet
66	Todd Bodine	Haas-Carter Motorsports	Ford
71	Dave Marcis	Marcis Auto Racing	Chevrolet
77	Robert Pressley	Jasper Motorsports	Ford
88	Dale Jarrett	Robert Yates Racing	Ford
90	Hut Stricklin	Donlavey Racing	Ford
92	Stacy Compton	Melling Racing	Dodge
93	Dave Blaney	Bill Davis Racing	Dodge
96	Andy Houston	PPI Motorsports	Ford
97	Kurt Busch	Roush Racing	Ford
99	Jeff Burton	Roush Racing	Ford

== Qualifying ==
Pos.	#	Driver	Make	Team	Time	Avg. Speed (mph)
1	97	Kurt Busch	Ford	Roush Racing	29.263	168.048
2	24	Jeff Gordon	Chevrolet	Hendrick Motorsports	29.286	167.916
3	12	Jeremy Mayfield	Ford	Penske Racing South	29.287	167.911
4	2	Rusty Wallace	Ford	Penske Racing South	29.292	167.882
5	29	Kevin Harvick	Chevrolet	Richard Childress Racing	29.294	167.871
6	43	John Andretti	Dodge	Petty Enterprises	29.360	167.493
7	32	Ricky Craven	Ford	PPI Motorsports	29.377	167.396
8	36	Ken Schrader	Pontiac	MBV Motorsports	29.402	167.254
9	9	Bill Elliott	Dodge	Evernham Motorsports	29.406	167.231
10	18	Bobby Labonte	Pontiac	Joe Gibbs Racing	29.410	167.208
11	25	Jerry Nadeau	Chevrolet	Hendrick Motorsports	29.442	167.027
12	40	Sterling Marlin	Dodge	Chip Ganassi Racing	29.448	166.993
13	6	Mark Martin	Ford	Roush Racing	29.456	166.947
14	93	Dave Blaney	Dodge	Bill Davis Racing	29.471	166.862
15	26	Jimmy Spencer	Ford	Haas-Carter Motorsports	29.482	166.800
16	77	Robert Pressley	Ford	Jasper Motorsports	29.505	166.670
17	10	Johnny Benson Jr.	Pontiac	MBV Motorsports	29.513	166.625
18	8	Dale Earnhardt Jr.	Chevrolet	Dale Earnhardt, Inc.	29.554	166.394
19	5	Terry Labonte	Chevrolet	Hendrick Motorsports	29.559	166.366
20	21	Elliott Sadler	Ford	Wood Brothers Racing	29.561	166.354
21	55	Bobby Hamilton	Chevrolet	Andy Petree Racing	29.563	166.343
22	92	Stacy Compton	Dodge	Melling Racing	29.621	166.017
23	99	Jeff Burton	Ford	Roush Racing	29.622	166.012
24	33	Joe Nemechek	Chevrolet	Andy Petree Racing	29.627	165.984
25	15	Michael Waltrip	Chevrolet	Dale Earnhardt, Inc.	29.632	165.956
26	28	Ricky Rudd	Ford	Robert Yates Racing	29.639	165.917
27	88	Dale Jarrett	Ford	Robert Yates Racing	29.641	165.905
28	17	Matt Kenseth	Ford	Roush Racing	29.664	165.777
29	4	Kevin Lepage	Chevrolet	Morgan–McClure Motorsports	29.669	165.749
30	19	Casey Atwood	Dodge	Evernham Motorsports	29.673	165.726
31	66	Todd Bodine	Ford	Haas-Carter Motorsports	29.680	165.687
32	11	Brett Bodine	Ford	Brett Bodine Racing	29.693	165.615
33	20	Tony Stewart	Pontiac	Joe Gibbs Racing	29.695	165.604
34	1	Kenny Wallace	Chevrolet	Dale Earnhardt, Inc.	29.704	165.553
35	31	Mike Skinner	Chevrolet	Richard Childress Racing	29.707	165.537
36	90	Hut Stricklin	Ford	Donlavey Racing	29.784	165.109
Provisionals
37	22	Ward Burton	Dodge	Bill Davis Racing	0.000	0.000
38	01	Jason Leffler	Dodge	Chip Ganassi Racing	0.000	0.000
39	7	Mike Wallace	Ford	Ultra Motorsports	0.000	0.000
40	14	Ron Hornaday Jr.	Pontiac	A.J. Foyt Racing	0.000	0.000
41	44	Buckshot Jones	Dodge	Petty Enterprises	0.000	0.000
42	45	Kyle Petty	Dodge	Petty Enterprises	0.000	0.000
43	27	Rick Mast	Pontiac	Eel River Racing	0.000	0.000
Failed to qualify
44	96	Andy Houston	Ford	PPI Motorsports	29.924	164.336
45	71	Dave Marcis	Chevrolet	Marcis Auto Racing	30.020	163.811

== Results ==
Fin	St	#	Driver	Make	Team	Sponsor	Laps	Led	Status	Pts	Winnings
1	37	22	Ward Burton	Dodge	Bill Davis Racing	Caterpillar	367	27	running	180	$181435
2	2	24	Jeff Gordon	Chevrolet	Hendrick Motorsports	DuPont Automotive	367	138	running	180	$153127
3	10	18	Bobby Labonte	Pontiac	Joe Gibbs Racing	Interstate Batteries	367	17	running	170	$133327
4	33	20	Tony Stewart	Pontiac	Joe Gibbs Racing	Home Depot	367	0	running	160	$93900
5	9	9	Bill Elliott	Dodge	Evernham Motorsports	Dodge 'Grab Life by the Horns', UAW	367	0	running	155	$92583
6	23	99	Jeff Burton	Ford	Roush Racing	MDA, Citgo Supergard	367	0	running	150	$100726
7	26	28	Ricky Rudd	Ford	Robert Yates Racing	Texaco, Havoline	367	0	running	146	$85657
8	5	29	Kevin Harvick	Chevrolet	Richard Childress Racing	GM Goodwrench	367	0	running	142	$93727
9	11	25	Jerry Nadeau	Chevrolet	Hendrick Motorsports	UAW-Delphi	367	0	running	138	$55660
10	8	36	Ken Schrader	Pontiac	MBV Motorsports	M&M's	367	0	running	134	$70815
11	19	5	Terry Labonte	Chevrolet	Hendrick Motorsports	Kellogg's	367	0	running	130	$78875
12	39	7	Mike Wallace	Ford	Ultra Motorsports	NationsRent	367	0	running	127	$63570
13	3	12	Jeremy Mayfield	Ford	Penske Racing South	Mobil 1	367	53	running	129	$84444
14	17	10	Johnny Benson Jr.	Pontiac	MBV Motorsports	Valvoline	367	0	running	121	$52670
15	21	55	Bobby Hamilton	Chevrolet	Andy Petree Racing	Square D	367	0	running	118	$55750
16	12	40	Sterling Marlin	Dodge	Chip Ganassi Racing	Coors Light	367	2	running	120	$59196
17	18	8	Dale Earnhardt Jr.	Chevrolet	Dale Earnhardt, Inc.	Budweiser	367	0	running	112	$74788
18	7	32	Ricky Craven	Ford	PPI Motorsports	Tide	367	1	running	114	$43290
19	14	93	Dave Blaney	Dodge	Bill Davis Racing	Amoco	367	0	running	106	$42935
20	13	6	Mark Martin	Ford	Roush Racing	Viagra, Pfizer	366	0	running	103	$88091
21	6	43	John Andretti	Dodge	Petty Enterprises	Cheerios	366	0	running	100	$77967
22	4	2	Rusty Wallace	Ford	Penske Racing South	Miller Lite	366	0	running	97	$84135
23	28	17	Matt Kenseth	Ford	Roush Racing	DeWalt	365	0	running	94	$50025
24	35	31	Mike Skinner	Chevrolet	Richard Childress Racing	Lowe's	365	0	running	91	$74049
25	30	19	Casey Atwood	Dodge	Evernham Motorsports	Dodge Dealers, UAW, Mountain Dew	364	0	running	88	$41990
26	42	45	Kyle Petty	Dodge	Petty Enterprises	Sprint	362	0	running	85	$38705
27	32	11	Brett Bodine	Ford	Brett Bodine Racing	Ralph's	362	0	running	82	$45760
28	29	4	Kevin Lepage	Chevrolet	Morgan–McClure Motorsports	Kodak	361	0	running	79	$43610
29	20	21	Elliott Sadler	Ford	Wood Brothers Racing	Motorcraft	359	0	running	76	$55900
30	43	27	Rick Mast	Pontiac	Eel River Racing	Duke's Mayonnaise, Sauer's	359	0	running	73	$37815
31	15	26	Jimmy Spencer	Ford	Haas-Carter Motorsports	Kmart	358	0	crash	70	$46155
32	36	90	Hut Stricklin	Ford	Donlavey Racing	Hills Brothers Coffee	358	0	running	67	$37540
33	24	33	Joe Nemechek	Chevrolet	Andy Petree Racing	Oakwood Homes	357	2	crash	69	$65720
34	27	88	Dale Jarrett	Ford	Robert Yates Racing	UPS	356	53	running	66	$82417
35	41	44	Buckshot Jones	Dodge	Petty Enterprises	Georgia-Pacific	355	0	running	58	$45255
36	25	15	Michael Waltrip	Chevrolet	Dale Earnhardt, Inc.	NAPA Auto Parts	355	0	running	55	$47170
37	40	14	Ron Hornaday Jr.	Pontiac	A.J. Foyt Racing	Conseco	355	0	running	52	$37081
38	16	77	Robert Pressley	Ford	Jasper Motorsports	Jasper Engines & Transmissions	348	0	crash	49	$44910
39	1	97	Kurt Busch	Ford	Roush Racing	Sharpie, Rubbermaid	316	74	running	51	$50375
40	31	66	Todd Bodine	Ford	Haas-Carter Motorsports	Kmart Blue Light Special	282	0	transmission	43	$36775
41	34	1	Kenny Wallace	Chevrolet	Dale Earnhardt, Inc.	Pennzoil	279	0	overheating	40	$62968
42	22	92	Stacy Compton	Dodge	Melling Racing	Kodiak	191	0	crash	37	$36675
43	38	01	Jason Leffler	Dodge	Chip Ganassi Racing	Cingular Wireless	90	0	overheating	34	$44880
Failed to qualify
44		96	Andy Houston	Ford	PPI Motorsports	McDonald's				31 (Note: Owner points awarded, based on speed.)	
45		71	Dave Marcis	Chevrolet	Marcis Auto Racing	Team Realtree				28	

== Race statistics ==
- Time of race: 4:05:00
- Average speed: 122.773 miles per hour (197.584 km/h)
- Pole speed: 168.048 miles per hour (270.447 km/h)
- Cautions: 11 for 51 laps
- Margin of victory: under caution
- Lead changes: 19
- Percent of race run under caution: 14.2%
- Average green flag run: 28.6 laps

== Notes ==
Previous race: 2001 Sharpie 500	NASCAR Winston Cup Series; 2001 season	Next race: 2001 Chevrolet Monte Carlo 400
