= Triad Racing Technologies =

Company

- Triad Racing Technologies' logo
- Formerly: Triad Racing Development
- Type: Private
- Industry: Automotive Motorsport
- Founded: 2008
- Founder: Marty Gaunt
- Defunct: 2020
- Headquarters: Mooresville, North Carolina
- Key people: Marty Gaunt (President & CEO)
- Products: Race Parts; Chassis Parts; Body Parts
- Website: http://www.triadrt.com

Triad Racing Technologies was a body parts and chassis supplier for NASCAR teams that ran under the Toyota manufacturer. The company was originally formed as Triad Racing Development before it was merged in late 2008 with Bill Davis Racing by Michael Held and Marty Gaunt. Originally, TRT was intended to field a full-time Sprint Cup Series and three full-time Camping World Truck Series teams that were originally owned by Davis, but a lack of sponsorship caused the organization to close all of its teams and lay off most of its employees. MBM Motorsports eventually invested into TRT, acquiring the company's equipment for use in the team's Cup and NASCAR Xfinity Series programs.

== Toyota Racing Development alliance ==
TRT had an exclusive partnership deal with Toyota Racing Development (TRD) in providing body parts and tuner services to TRD for its NASCAR Cup Series programs. TRT previously provided engines to TRD before TRT sold its engine division. It was also the exclusive parts supplier for all Toyota NASCAR body parts. Triad used to have an exclusive relationship with TRD for NASCAR Cup Series engine development.

This partnership with Toyota and TRD dates back to when Toyota had first entered NASCAR officially in 2005.

== Manufacturing capabilities ==
Triad had a various number of capabilities when it came to building engines, bodies, and chassis' to produce dependable parts.

These include:

- Fully equipped parts department utilizing 100% serialization and parts lifting
- Brown and Sharpe Coordinate Measuring Machine (CMM)
- Rockwell Tester
- Confirms hardness of porous and non-porous metals (i.e. Steel and Aluminum)
- EZ Cam
- Checks lobes, Journals, and taper configuration in cams
- 99% success rate for race engine durability
- Horsepower for all engines is consistent to within +/- one half of one percent
- Four Dyno cells
- Two Spintron cells
- Five assembly Laboratories
- Full CNC Capabilities up to 5-axis
- Measures repeatability to .00008 of an inch (Pistons, Valves, Rings, Blocks, Cams, and Cranks)
- Mahr Form Tester
- Measures critical features on valves and pistons with accuracy to .00004 of an inch
- 99% success rate for race engine durability
- Horsepower for all engines is consistent to within +/- one half of one percent
- Disassembly Area, Block Prep, Grinding, Head/Manifold Department, EFI/Carb Lab, Magnaflux Lab
- Metrology lab including Brown and Sharpe coordinate measuring machine and (2) Faro arms
- Full engine inventory and spares room

== Former clients ==
- Toyota Motor Sales, USA, Inc.
- Toyota Racing Development
- AM Racing
- BK Racing (defunct)
- Bill McAnally Racing
- Chris Fontaine Enterprises
- Fortin Racing
- Furniture Row Racing (defunct)
- Gaunt Brothers Racing (defunct)
- Germain Racing (defunct)
- Hattori Racing Enterprises (TRD)
- Joe Gibbs Racing (TRD)
- JTG Daugherty Racing (now Chevrolet)
- Kyle Busch Motorsports (TRD)
- Michael Waltrip Racing (defunct)
- NEMCO Motorsports (now Chevrolet)
- Ken Schrader Racing (now Ford)
- Swan Racing (defunct) (defunct)
- Rusty Wallace Racing (defunct)
- RAB Racing (defunct)
- Red Horse Racing (defunct)
- Win-Tron Racing (now Chevrolet)
- TriStar Motorsports (defunct)
- ThorSport Racing
- Diversified Motorsports Enterprises (now Chevrolet)
- Tommy Baldwin Racing (now Chevrolet)
- Venturini Motorsports (TRD)
