= Robb Brent =

American racing driver (born 1987)

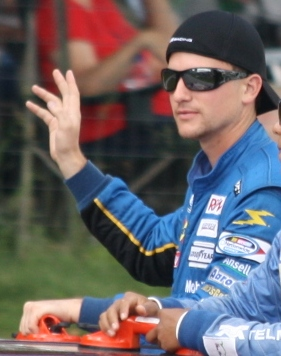
- Brent at Road America in 2010
- Nationality: (United States) American
- Born: Robert Brent; February 6, 1987 (age 39) Shelby Township, Michigan, U.S.

ARCA Menards Series career
- Debut season: 2006
- Starts: 59
- Wins: 1
- Poles: 0
- Best finish: 10th in 2009
- Finished last season: 63rd (2011)

NASCAR O'Reilly Auto Parts Series career
- 1 race run over 1 year
- 2010 position: 126th
- Best finish: 126th (2010)
- First race: 2010 Bucyrus 200 (Road America)
Wins	Top tens	Poles
0	0	0

NASCAR FedEx Freight Truck Series career
- 3 races run over 1 year
- Best finish: 57th (2008)
- First race: 2008 Toyota Tundra 200 (Nashville)
- Last race: 2008 Qwik Liner Las Vegas 350 (Las Vegas)
Wins	Top tens	Poles
0	0	0
- Statistics up to date as of March 16, 2020.

Robert Brent (born February 6, 1987) is an American professional stock car racing driver who most recently competed in what is now the ARCA Menards Series in 2011. He competed full-time in the same series in 2009 and 2010, finishing tenth and eleventh in points, respectively, in those years. He also made three starts in the NASCAR Truck Series in 2008 and one Nationwide Series start in 2010.

== Career ==
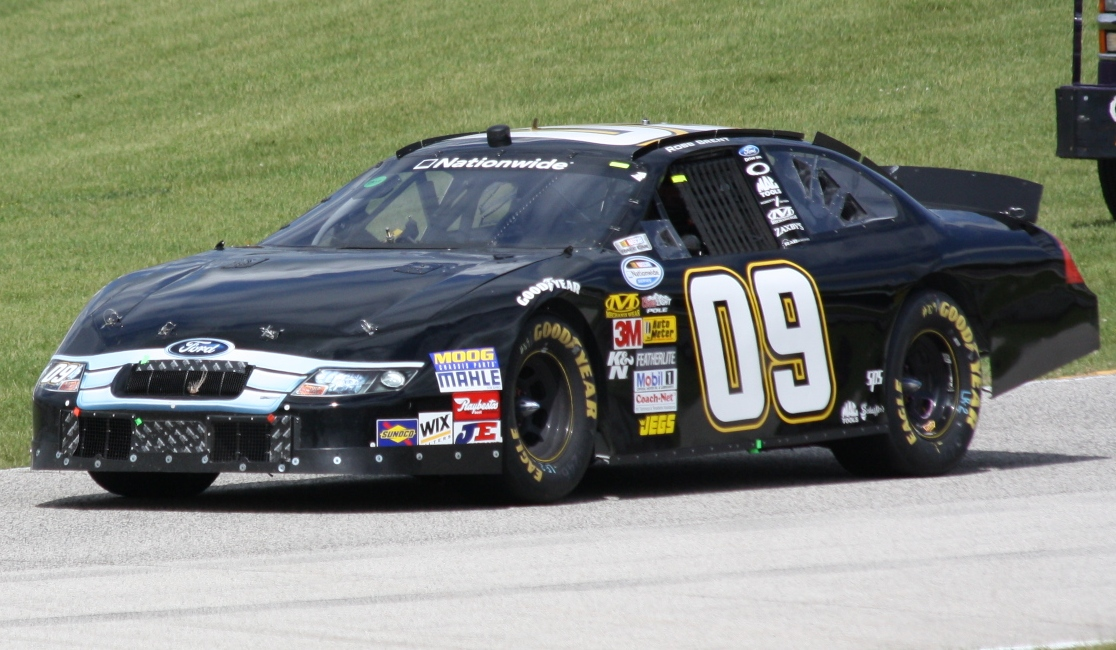
Brent's No. 09 Nationwide car for RAB Racing at Road America in 2010, his only start in the series.

Brent was called by RAB Racing to drive their No. 09 Ford at the road course race at Road America in 2010. The team, which was running multiple drivers that year, had already signed Boris Said to drive those races for them, but he was unavailable for this race, because he opted to compete in the Cup Series road course race at Sonoma instead, which was on the same weekend as the Road America Nationwide race. In looking for a driver, Said and RAB owner Robby Benton chose Brent, a full-time ARCA Racing Series driver for Allgaier Motorsports, after his strong finishes in the road course races in that series at Palm Beach and New Jersey Motorsports Park earlier in the season.

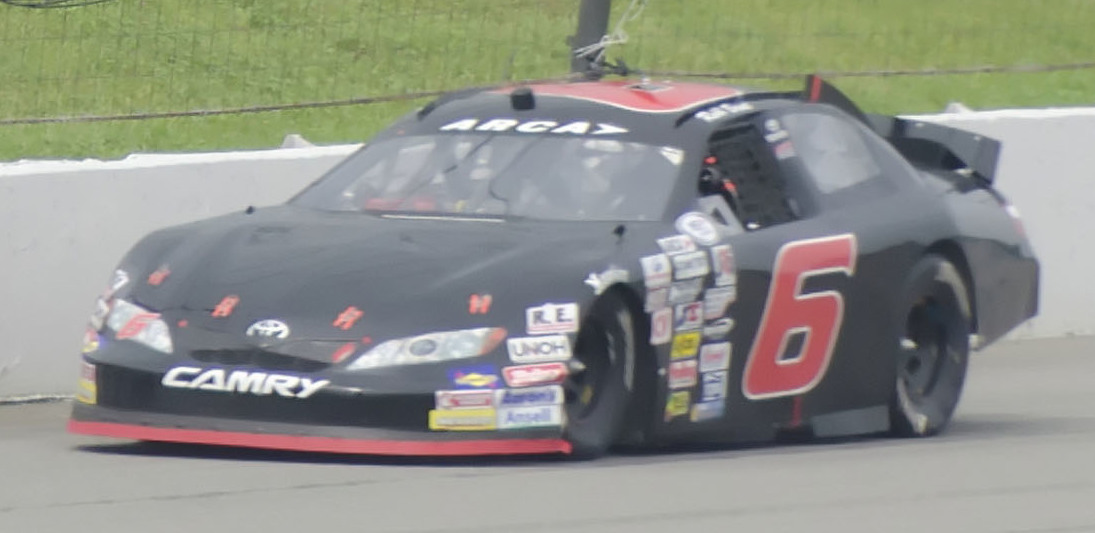
Brent's No. 6 ARCA car for Eddie Sharp Racing at Pocono in 2011.

== Personal life ==
Brent lives in Shelby Township, Michigan and graduated from Eisenhower High School in 2005, according to his Facebook page. He then went on to attend Northwood University, graduating in 2009 with a degree in automotive marketing. According to his LinkedIn profile, he has worked as the Human Resources Coordinator at Central Transport (a company located in the Detroit metropolitan area) since January 2020, and before that, was the Vice President and the Internet Manager of the Orchard Chrysler Dodge Jeep RAM dealership in Washington Township, Michigan (the town north of Shelby).

== Motorsports career results ==
=== NASCAR ===
(key) (Bold – Pole position awarded by qualifying time. Italics – Pole position earned by points standings or practice time. * – Most laps led.)

==== Nationwide Series ====
NASCAR Nationwide Series results
Year	Team	No.	Make	1	2	3	4	5	6	7	8	9	10	11	12	13	14	15	16	17	18	19	20	21	22	23	24	25	26	27	28	29	30	31	32	33	34	35	NNSC	Pts	Ref
2010	RAB Racing	09	Ford	DAY	CAL	LVS	BRI	NSH	PHO	TEX	TAL	RCH	DAR	DOV	CLT	NSH	KEN	ROA; 30	NHA	DAY	CHI	GTY	IRP	IOW	GLN	MCH	BRI	CGV	ATL	RCH	DOV	KAN	CAL	CLT	GTY	TEX	PHO	HOM	126th	73	

^{*} Season still in progress
^{1} Ineligible for series points

==== Craftsman Truck Series ====
NASCAR Camping World Truck Series results
Year	Team	No.	Make	1	2	3	4	5	6	7	8	9	10	11	12	13	14	15	16	17	18	19	20	21	22	23	24	25	NCWTC	Pts	Ref
2008	Brad Keselowski Racing	19	Chevy	DAY	CAL	ATL	MAR	KAN	CLT	MFD	DOV	TEX	MCH	MLW	MEM	KEN	IRP	NSH; 21	BRI	GTY; 32	NHA	LVS; 24	TAL	MAR	ATL	TEX	PHO	HOM	57th	258	

=== ARCA Racing Series ===
ARCA Racing Series results
Year	Team	No.	Make	1	2	3	4	5	6	7	8	9	10	11	12	13	14	15	16	17	18	19	20	21	22	23	ARSC	Pts	Ref
2006	Brad Keselowski Racing	00	Ford	DAY	NSH	SLM	WIN	KEN	TOL	POC	MCH	KAN	KEN	BLN	POC	GTW	NSH	MCH	ISF	MIL	TOL; 30	DSF	CHI	SLM	TAL	IOW	152nd	80	
2007	Brad Keselowski Racing	00	Ford	DAY	USA; 16	NSH	SLM	KAN	WIN	KEN	TOL; 35	IOW	POC	MCH; 16	BLN	KEN; 12	POC	NSH; 10	ISF	MIL	GTW	DSF	CHI; 33	SLM	TAL; 27	TOL; 35	35th	920	
2008	Brad Keselowski Racing	00	Chevy	DAY; DNQ	SLM	IOW; 13	KAN; 5	CAR	KEN; 31	TOL; 32	POC; 6	MCH; 11	CAY	KEN; 8	BLN	POC; 5	NSH	ISF	DSF	CHI	SLM	NJE	TAL	TOL			26th	1340	
2009	Allgaier Motorsports	36	Chevy	DAY; DNQ	SLM; 10	CAR; 34						MFD; 25			BLN; 15		ISF; 13			DSF; 11		SLM; 20					10th	4315	
2009	Allgaier Motorsports	36	Dodge				TAL; 34	KEN; 8	TOL; 9	POC; 7	MCH; 11		IOW; 11	KEN; 12		POC; 7		CHI; 15	TOL; 12		NJE; 4		KAN; 34	CAR; 21			10th	4315	
2010	Allgaier Motorsports	36	Dodge	DAY; 13		SLM; 24	TEX; 5		TOL; 13	POC; 6	MCH; 10	IOW; 23	MFD; 14	POC; 1	BLN; 12			CHI; 24		TOL; 10	SLM; 10	KAN; 27	CAR; 26				11th	4120	
2010	Allgaier Motorsports	36	Chevy		PBE; 2			TAL; 35								NJE; 14	ISF; 8		DSF; 22								11th	4120	
2011	Eddie Sharp Racing	2	Toyota	DAY	TAL	SLM	TOL	NJE	CHI	POC	MCH; 11	WIN	BLN	IOW	IRP												63rd	365	
2011	Eddie Sharp Racing	6	Toyota													POC; 8	ISF	MAD	DSF	SLM	KAN	TOL					63rd	365	
