= Robby Benton =

American racing driver

- Born: Robert A. Benton Jr. June 28, 1979 (age 47) Harrisburg, North Carolina, U.S.
- Relatives: Danielle Trotta (wife)

ARCA Re/Max Series career
- Debut season: 2000
- Former teams: RAB Racing, Gerhart Racing
- Starts: 11
- Wins: 0
- Poles: 0
- Best finish: 34th in 2002
- Finished last season: 80th (2003)

Previous series
- 2005: NASCAR Busch North Series

NASCAR O'Reilly Auto Parts Series career
- 4 races run over 3 years
- 2004 position: N/A
- Best finish: 93rd (2003)
- First race: 2002 Stacker 2/GNC Live Well 250 (Daytona)
- Last race: 2003 Sam's Town 300 (Las Vegas)
Wins	Top tens	Poles
0	0	0

NASCAR FedEx Freight Truck Series career
- 3 races run over 2 years
- 2003 position: 84th
- Best finish: 84th (2003)
- First race: 2003 New Hampshire 200 (New Hampshire)
- Last race: 2003 Las Vegas 350 (Las Vegas)
Wins	Top tens	Poles
0	0	0
- Statistics up to date as of July 7, 2020.

Robert A. Benton Jr. (born June 28, 1979) is an American former professional stock car racing driver who competed in the NASCAR Busch, Truck and East Series as well as the ARCA Re/Max Series. He currently works as the team manager for Team Penske's NASCAR teams. Before starting in that position in January 2018, he was the owner of NASCAR team RAB Racing and Change Racing, a team in the IMSA sports car series.

== Racing career ==
=== Team owner career ===
Benton's first dip into team ownership came in the early part of his career, when he fielded cars for himself when he competed in a No. 82 Ford in the ARCA Re/Max Series in 2000.

Benton then partnered with owner-driver Brack Maggard's ARCA team in 2007 to form RAB Racing with Brack Maggard. Benton became the majority owner, and the name change to RAB stood for Benton's initials. The team continued to field Maggard's No. 65 Dodge with Justin Marks, who joined the team late in 2006, continuing as the driver.

RAB Racing would begin in NASCAR in 2008, fielding a Nationwide (now Xfinity) Series team with John Wes Townley driving the No. 09 Ford with Zaxby's sponsorship, which Townley brought to the team. They would leave after 2009, with the team starting the 2010 season without a sponsor. Scott Riggs was supposed to drive the car full-time, but was quickly replaced by any driver who brought sponsorship in order to keep the team afloat. The team was likely to shut down at some point that year or at the end of the year, but the team pulled off an upset win in the Montreal race with road course ringer Boris Said in an exciting photo finish with Max Papis, which saved the team from closing.

The team later switched to Toyota for the rest of his owner career.

== Motorsports career results ==
=== NASCAR ===
(key) (Bold – Pole position awarded by qualifying time. Italics – Pole position earned by points standings or practice time. * – Most laps led.)

==== Busch Series ====
NASCAR Busch Series results
Year	Team	No.	Make	1	2	3	4	5	6	7	8	9	10	11	12	13	14	15	16	17	18	19	20	21	22	23	24	25	26	27	28	29	30	31	32	33	34	NBSC	Pts	Ref
2002	John Josey	86	Chevy	DAY	CAR	LVS	DAR	BRI	TEX	NSH	TAL	CAL	RCH	NHA	NZH	CLT	DOV	NSH	KEN	MLW	DAY; 40	CHI	GTY	PPR	IRP	MCH	BRI	DAR	RCH	DOV	KAN	CLT	MEM	ATL	CAR	PHO	HOM	120th	43	
2003	KAR Racing	70	Chevy	DAY; 37	CAR; 37	LVS; 26	DAR	BRI																														93rd	189	
2003	Lackey Motorsports	85	Chevy						TEX; DNQ	TAL	NSH	CAL	RCH	GTY	NZH	CLT	DOV	NSH	KEN	MLW	DAY	CHI	NHA	PPR	IRP	MCH	BRI	DAR	RCH	DOV	KAN	CLT	MEM	ATL	PHO	CAR	HOM	93rd	189	
2004	Jay Robinson Racing	39	Ford	DAY; DNQ	CAR	LVS	DAR	BRI	TEX	NSH																												N/A	0	
2004	RAB Racing	03	Ford								TAL; DNQ	CAL	GTY	RCH	NZH	CLT	DOV	NSH	KEN	MLW	DAY	CHI	NHA	PPR	IRP	MCH	BRI	CAL	RCH	DOV	KAN	CLT; DNQ	MEM	ATL	PHO	DAR	HOM	N/A	0	

==== Craftsman Truck Series ====
NASCAR Craftsman Truck Series results
Year	Team	No.	Make	1	2	3	4	5	6	7	8	9	10	11	12	13	14	15	16	17	18	19	20	21	22	23	24	25	NCWTC	Pts	Ref
2002	Johnny Myers	36	Chevy	DAY	DAR	MAR	GTY	PPR	DOV	TEX	MEM	MLW	KAN	KEN	NHA	MCH	IRP	NSH	RCH	TEX	SBO	LVS	CAL	PHO	HOM; DNQ				N/A	0	
2003	Fasscore Motorsports	15	Ford	DAY	DAR	MMR	MAR	CLT	DOV	TEX	MEM	MLW	KAN	KEN	GTW	MCH	IRP	NSH	BRI	RCH	NHA; 25		LVS; 22	SBO	TEX	MAR	PHO	HOM	84th	185	
2003	Fasscore Motorsports	15	Dodge																			CAL; 25							84th	185	

==== Busch North Series ====
NASCAR Busch North Series results
Year	Team	No.	Make	1	2	3	4	5	6	7	8	9	10	11	12	13	NBNSC	Pts	Ref
2005	Info not available	65	Ford	STA	HOL	ERI	NHA	WFD	ADI	STA	DUB	OXF	NHA; 34	DOV	LRP	TMP	64th	61	

=== ARCA Re/Max Series ===
(key) (Bold – Pole position awarded by qualifying time. Italics – Pole position earned by points standings or practice time. * – Most laps led.)

ARCA Re/Max Series results
Year	Team	No.	Make	1	2	3	4	5	6	7	8	9	10	11	12	13	14	15	16	17	18	19	20	21	22	23	24	25	ARMC	Pts	Ref
2000	RAB Racing	82	Ford	DAY	SLM	AND	CLT	KIL	FRS	MCH	POC	TOL	KEN	BLN	POC; DNQ	WIN	ISF	KEN	DSF	SLM	CLT; 40	TAL	ATL						144th	30	
2001	RAB Racing	82	Ford	DAY; 15	NSH	WIN	SLM	GTY	KEN																		TAL; 6	ATL	53rd	665	
2001	Gerhart Racing	7	Ford							CLT; 16	KAN	MCH	POC	MEM	GLN	KEN	MCH	POC	NSH	ISF	CHI	DSF	SLM	TOL	BLN	CLT; 14			53rd	665	
2002	RAB Racing	82	Ford	DAY; 34	ATL	NSH	SLM	KEN	CLT; 4	KAN	POC	MCH	TOL	SBO	KEN	BLN	POC	NSH	ISF	WIN	DSF	CHI	SLM	TAL; 9	CLT; 17				34th	850	
2003	RAB Racing	82	Ford	DAY; 19	ATL	NSH	SLM	TOL	KEN															CLT; DNQ	SBO				80th	330	
2003	RAB Racing	8	Ford							CLT; 12	BLN	KAN	MCH	LER	POC	POC	NSH	ISF	WIN	DSF	CHI	SLM	TAL						80th	330	
