= Tyler Allen =

American NASCAR crew chief (born 1987)

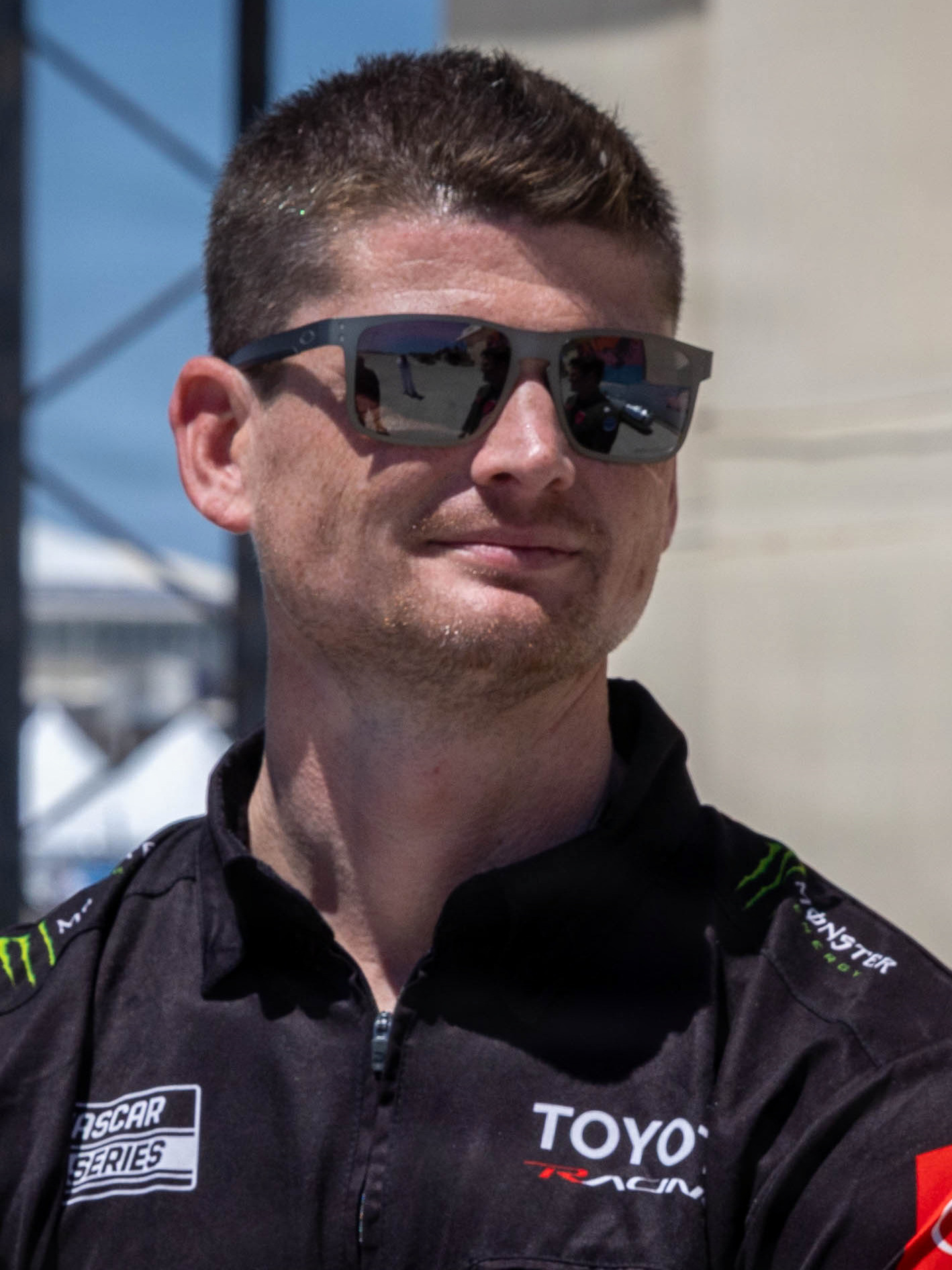
- Allen in 2026

Personal information
- Born: Tyler Kristian Allen; November 15, 1987 (age 38) Tacoma, Washington, U.S.
- Education: University of Washington
- Occupations: NASCAR race engineer and crew chief

Sport
- Country: United States
- Sport: Motor racing
- League: NASCAR Cup Series
- Team: No. 54 Joe Gibbs Racing

Tyler Kristian Allen (born November 15, 1987) is an American NASCAR crew chief who works for Joe Gibbs Racing as the crew chief for their No. 54 Toyota Camry XSE in the NASCAR Cup Series driven by Ty Gibbs.

Allen has worked in NASCAR since 2012. He started his career with Venturini Motorsports in the ARCA Racing Series where he spent two years working as car chief on the No. 25 car driven by Brennan Poole and Alex Bowman and later moved to RAB Racing where he was the race engineer for No. 99 Nationwide Series Toyota Camry driven by James Buescher. In 2019, Allen and the Joe Gibbs Racing No. 18 Toyota Camry Team won the NASCAR Cup Series Championship with crew chief Adam Stevens and driver Kyle Busch. In 2023, he was a crew chief for JGR in the NASCAR Xfinity Series. Allen is a graduate of the University of Washington, where he achieved a bachelor's degree in Mechanical Engineering and was part of the UW Formula SAE team for four years.

== Early years ==
The Allen racing gene comes from his grandfather Robert Allen. "Grandpa Bob" had started racing in the 1950s on the small dirt tracks of California, ultimately ending up racing Hydroplanes in the Pacific Northwest which led him to a National Hydroplane Championship in 1983. From a young age, Allen was raised around the small tracks of the Pacific Northwest as his father Terry and two uncles Mike and John raced 1/2 sized stock cars.

In 2007, Allen was accepted to the University of Washington School of Mechanical Engineering. As part of his engineering studies, he joined the UW Formula SAE team and was assigned to the suspension design team. While attending school, Allen started Allen Racing and began driving Limited Late Model Stock cars. Allen competed for three years at South Sound Speedway where he completed his third year finishing second in points for the South Sound Limited Late Model championship. In 2010, Allen finished his racing in the Pacific Northwest, competing at Evergreen Speedway in the NASCAR Whelen All-American Series.

Allen supported his racing working for ROMAC Industries, where he was a Product Development Engineer responsible for the design, prototyping, component testing, manufacturing, production tooling development and cost analysis of a new product called the PIRANHA. Allen left ROMAC at the end of 2010 to move to North Carolina and pursue his dream of competing and winning in NASCAR.

== Richard Petty Drivers Search II ==
In September 2010, Allen was chosen as part of the Richard Petty Driver Search I. Allen competed against 12 other drivers from around the world for a chance to race in the ARCA Racing Series for Richard Petty Motorsports. Allen drove to a fifth overall finish, taking first in Mechanical and Marketing categories of the driving competition.

== Move to North Carolina ==
Allen relocated to North Carolina to pursue working in NASCAR. Allen was hired by Richard Petty Driving Experience as a driving instructor, where he traveled across the United States driving stock cars on some of the most famous race tracks in North America, including Charlotte Motor Speedway, Bristol Motor Speedway, Daytona Int'l Speedway, Atlanta Motor Speedway, and Las Vegas Motor Speedway. Allen worked with NASCAR stock car racing driver and crew chief Brad Noffsinger, who is currently lead instructor and head of driver development at Richard Petty Driving Experience. Allen supported Noffsigner's USAC Ford Focus Carolina Series team.

== ARCA Racing Series ==
In late 2011, Allen went to work for Venturini Motorsports where he volunteered as a shop helper. He was quickly hired and started work as a shop mechanic, fabricating and building race cars in preparation for the 2012 season. Allen was assigned to crew chief Billy Venturini as car chief for the 2012 season. Allen led chassis setup plate, pull down rig analysis and simulation, including wind tunnel aerodynamic testing. Allen was soon promoted to car chief working for Billy Venturini and driver Brennan Poole, where they had a successful ARCA season with two wins, three poles, five top-fives and 15 top-ten finishes.

== NASCAR Nationwide/Xfinity Series ==
In 2012, Allen made his move to NASCAR where he was hired by RAB Racing with Brack Maggard as the race engineer for the No. 99 car driven by Alex Bowman. Allen was teamed up with veteran crew chief Chris Rice, where they finished the 2012 season with two top-fives, five top-tens, and six top-15 finishes.

Allen continued to develop his chassis set up skills at RAB Racing using static and dynamic vehicle testing procedures while developing and executing vehicle test plans that utilized pull down rigs, 8-post shaker, AVCS Rig and wind tunnel testing. Allen worked closely with engineering resources from Toyota Racing Development (TRD) utilizing their vast resources and race experience to develop pre-season testing strategies using MoTec and PI OSIsoftreal time data capture and analysis. Matt Lucas took over as crew chief for James Buescher, replacing Chris Rice, who moved to NASCAR Camping World Truck Series.

In December 2014, Allen was hired by Joe Gibbs Racing as a race engineer on the No. 54 NASCAR Xfinity Series working for NASCAR crew chief Chris Gayle and driver Kyle Busch where they went on to win five poles and six wins and lead 1000 laps during the 2015 season. In 2016, Allen moved to the Joe Gibbs No. 18 team again with Busch, where they won nine poles, ten wins and led over 2,000 laps. Drivers that also drove the No. 54 and No. 18 in 2015 and 2016 included Boris Said, Bobby Labonte, Denny Hamlin, David Ragan, Owen Kelly, Drew Herring, and Matt Tifft.

On December 13, 2023, Joe Gibbs Racing announced that Allen would be promoted to crew chief on their Xfinity Series No. 20 car in 2024, primarily driven by John Hunter Nemechek and Aric Almirola.

On October 16, 2024, JGR announced that Allen would be the crew chief for Taylor Gray in his rookie season in the Xfinity Series in 2025 in the No. 54 car. However, on December 2, JGR instead announced that he would crew chief their No. 54 car in the Cup Series driven by Ty Gibbs in 2025, with Jason Ratcliff coming out of retirement to be Taylor Gray's crew chief in the Xfinity Series.

== NASCAR Cup Series ==
In 2017, Allen moved up to the Joe Gibbs Racing NASCAR Cup Series No. 18 team with crew chief Adam Stevens and 2015 NASCAR Sprint Cup Series Champion Kyle Busch where from 2017 to 2020 the team went on to win 13 poles and 19 wins, including the NASCAR Championship in 2019. In 2021, Allen moved to the JGR No. 20 NASCAR Cup Series team as the lead race engineer for Stevens and driver Christopher Bell.

In December 2024, Allen was announced as the crew chief of the JGR No. 54 car, driven by Ty Gibbs, starting in 2025.
