= 2014 Coke Zero 400 =

NASCAR race at Daytona in 2014

Race details
- Race 18 of 36 in the 2014 NASCAR Sprint Cup Series
- The 2014 Coke Zero 400 program cover, featuring highlights from last year's race.
- Date: July 6, 2014
- Official name: Coke Zero 400 Powered by Coca-Cola at Daytona
- Location: Daytona International Speedway in Daytona Beach, Florida
- Course: Permanent racing facility
- Course length: 2.5 miles (4.023 km)
- Distance: 112 laps, 280 mi (450.616 km)
- Scheduled distance: 160 laps, 400 mi (643.738 km)
- Weather: Partly cloudy with temperatures up to 83 °F (28 °C); wind out of the south at 6 miles per hour (9.7 km/h)
- Average speed: 130.014 mph (209.237 km/h)

Pole position
Driver	David Gilliland	Front Row Motorsports
- Time: 45.153

Most laps led
Driver	Kurt Busch	Stewart–Haas Racing
- Laps: 36

Winner
No. 43	Aric Almirola	Richard Petty Motorsports

Television in the United States
- Network: TNT & MRN
- Announcers: Adam Alexander, Wally Dallenbach Jr. and Kyle Petty (Television); Joe Moore, Jeff Striegle and Barney Hall (Booth); Dave Moody (1 & 2), Mike Bagley (Backstretch) and Kurt Becker (3 & 4) (Turns) (Radio)
- Nielsen ratings: 2.4/5; 4.0 Million viewers

The 2014 Coke Zero 400 powered by Coca-Cola was a NASCAR Sprint Cup Series stock car race that was scheduled to be held on July 5, 2014, but was pushed to July 6, 2014, at Daytona International Speedway in Daytona Beach, Florida. The race was originally scheduled to be run over 160 laps, though only 112 laps were contested due to rain, it was the 18th race of the 2014 NASCAR Sprint Cup Series season. Aric Almirola was leading when the race was called for rain and scored his first career win and the No. 43's first win since the 1999 Goody's Body Pain 500. Brian Vickers was second, while Kurt Busch, Casey Mears, and top rookie Austin Dillon rounded out the top five. Behind Dillon, the top rookies of the race were Alex Bowman in 13th, and Michael Annett in 21st.

== Report ==
=== Background ===
Daytona International Speedway, where the race was held.

Daytona International Speedway is a four-turn superspeedway that is 2.5 miles (4.0 km) long. The track's turns are banked at 31 degrees, while the front stretch, the location of the finish line, is banked at 18 degrees. The backstretch, which has a length of 3,000 ft (910 m), has minimal banking that is used for drainage. Jimmie Johnson was the defending race winner from the 2013 event.

Following the Daytona 500 in February, 2,400 ft (730 m) of additional SAFER barriers were added to the circuit, in order to improve safety. The additional barriers were added from the exit of turn four, through the tri-oval and to the entrance of turn one; this left only the super stretch outside walls with concrete barriers. "We're always looking at ways to enhance our safety and it is a priority for us," said Lenny Santiago, senior director of public relations for Daytona International Speedway. "Whenever we have an incident on track, we always take a look in consultation with NASCAR, the University of Nebraska and other experts that are a part of the Motorsports Technology Group and take their recommendations. In consultation with them, we made sure we added additional safer barriers to these areas."

Prior to the start of the race, Barney Hall announced that this race would be his last in the booth for the Motor Racing Network. "The years have gone by so quick, it's just so hard to believe," Hall said with a smile during a break at Daytona International Speedway. "The voice of NASCAR is the voice of MRN and that's Barney Hall," said David Hyatt, president and executive producer of Motor Racing Network. "To have him still be a part of what we do in a way that highlights all the memories that he has, all the history he's brought to the sport, everything that he's done, not just for this MRN brand but for the NASCAR brand is an important part of this transition. MRN isn't MRN without Barney Hall."

=== Entry list ===
The entry list for the Coke Zero 400 was released on Tuesday, July 1, 2014, at 11:40 a.m. Eastern time. Forty-four cars were entered for the race.

No.	Driver	Team	Manufacturer
1	Jamie McMurray	Chip Ganassi Racing	Chevrolet
2	Brad Keselowski (PC2)	Team Penske	Ford
3	Austin Dillon (R)	Richard Childress Racing	Chevrolet
4	Kevin Harvick	Stewart–Haas Racing	Chevrolet
5	Kasey Kahne	Hendrick Motorsports	Chevrolet
7	Michael Annett (R)	Tommy Baldwin Racing	Chevrolet
9	Marcos Ambrose	Richard Petty Motorsports	Ford
10	Danica Patrick	Stewart–Haas Racing	Chevrolet
11	Denny Hamlin	Joe Gibbs Racing	Toyota
13	Casey Mears	Germain Racing	Chevrolet
14	Tony Stewart (PC3)	Stewart–Haas Racing	Chevrolet
15	Clint Bowyer	Michael Waltrip Racing	Toyota
16	Greg Biffle	Roush Fenway Racing	Ford
17	Ricky Stenhouse Jr.	Roush Fenway Racing	Ford
18	Kyle Busch	Joe Gibbs Racing	Toyota
20	Matt Kenseth (PC5)	Joe Gibbs Racing	Toyota
21	Trevor Bayne (i)	Wood Brothers Racing	Ford
22	Joey Logano	Team Penske	Ford
23	Alex Bowman (R)	BK Racing	Toyota
24	Jeff Gordon (PC6)	Hendrick Motorsports	Chevrolet
26	Cole Whitt (R)	BK Racing	Toyota
27	Paul Menard	Richard Childress Racing	Chevrolet
29	Joe Nemechek	RAB Racing	Toyota
31	Ryan Newman	Richard Childress Racing	Chevrolet
32	Terry Labonte (PC8)	Go FAS Racing	Ford
33	Bobby Labonte (PC7)	Circle Sport	Chevrolet
34	David Ragan	Front Row Motorsports	Ford
36	Reed Sorenson	Tommy Baldwin Racing	Chevrolet
38	David Gilliland	Front Row Motorsports	Ford
40	Landon Cassill (i)	Circle Sport	Chevrolet
41	Kurt Busch (PC4)	Stewart–Haas Racing	Chevrolet
42	Kyle Larson (R)	Chip Ganassi Racing	Chevrolet
43	Aric Almirola	Richard Petty Motorsports	Ford
47	A. J. Allmendinger	JTG Daugherty Racing	Chevrolet
48	Jimmie Johnson (PC1)	Hendrick Motorsports	Chevrolet
51	Justin Allgaier (R)	HScott Motorsports	Chevrolet
55	Brian Vickers	Michael Waltrip Racing	Toyota
66	Michael Waltrip	Michael Waltrip Racing	Toyota
78	Martin Truex Jr.	Furniture Row Racing	Chevrolet
83	Ryan Truex (R)	BK Racing	Toyota
88	Dale Earnhardt Jr.	Hendrick Motorsports	Chevrolet
95	Michael McDowell	Leavine Family Racing	Ford
98	Josh Wise	Phil Parsons Racing	Chevrolet
99	Carl Edwards	Roush Fenway Racing	Ford
Official entry list

Key	Meaning
(R)	Rookie
(i)	Ineligible for points
(PC#)	Past champions provisional

*Was taken off of the car due to NASCAR rules and regulations. Replaced with a black hood.

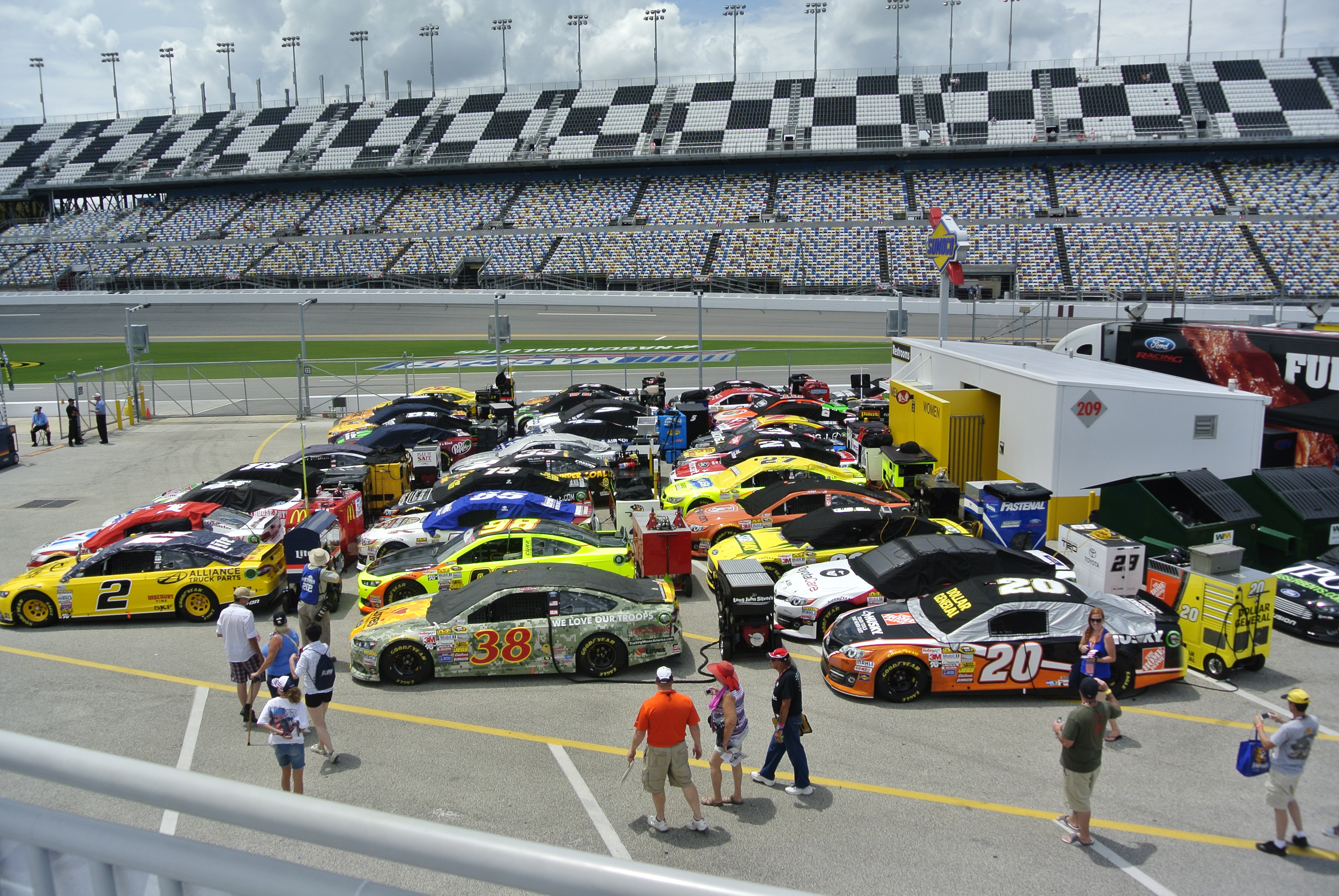
Cars lined up in the garage for the race.

== Practice ==
Two practice sessions were scheduled for the Sprint Cup Series at Daytona. The first practice session was delayed an hour by weather and shortened to 45 minutes. Jamie McMurray was the fastest with a lap time of 44.565 and a speed of 201.952 mph (325.010 km/h). The final practice session was cancelled due to weather.

Pos	No.	Driver	Team	Manufacturer	Time	Speed
1	1	Jamie McMurray	Chip Ganassi Racing	Chevrolet	44.565	201.952
2	42	Kyle Larson (R)	Chip Ganassi Racing	Chevrolet	44.579	201.889
3	15	Clint Bowyer	Michael Waltrip Racing	Toyota	44.590	201.839
Official practice results

== Qualifying ==
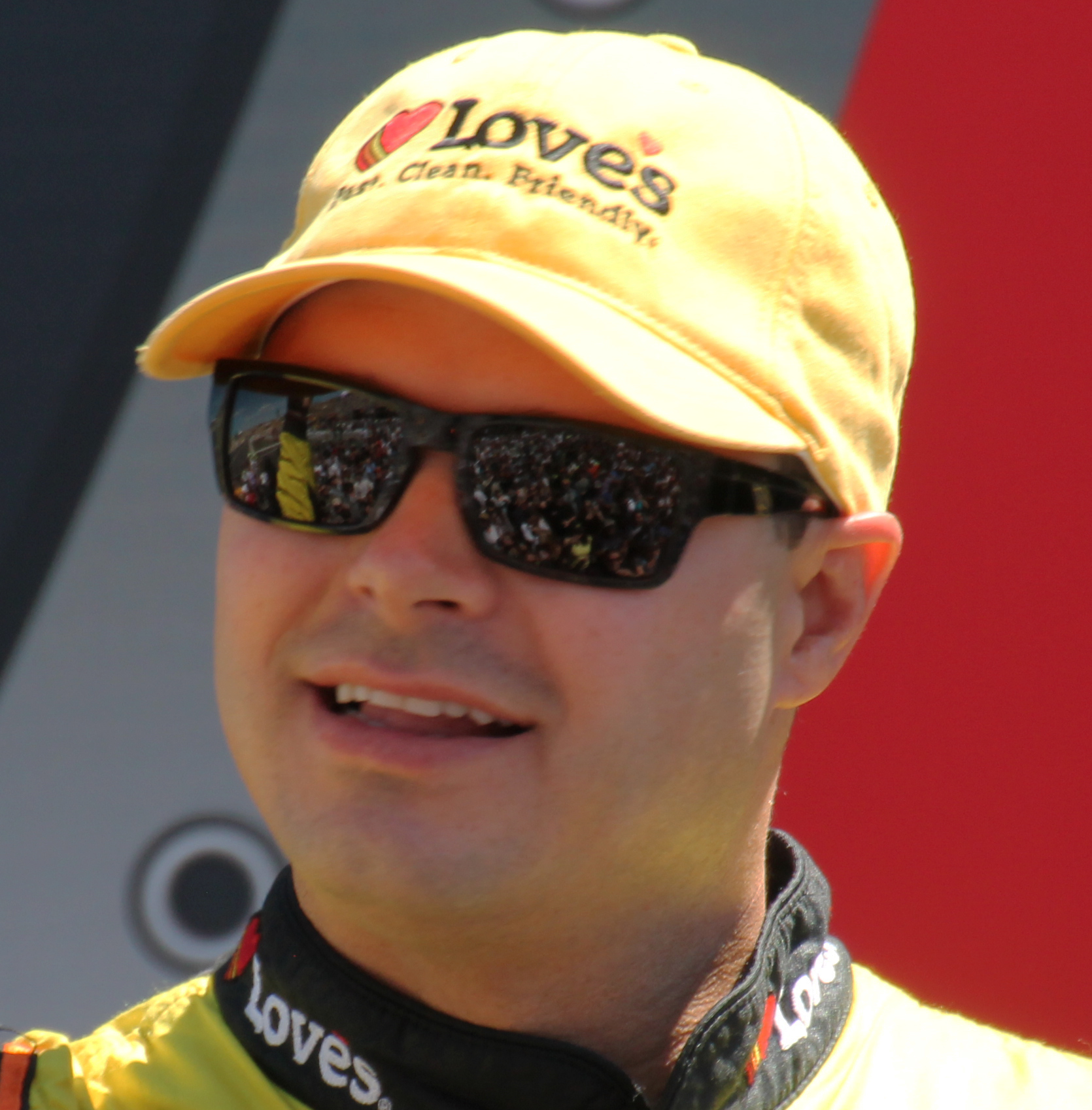
David Gilliland won the pole position, the first for Front Row Motorsports.

David Gilliland won the pole with a lap time of 45.153 and a speed of 199.322 mph (320.778 km/h) after only one round of knockout qualifying was completed due to weather. Gilliland stated that his pole position would be a "morale booster" for his Front Row Motorsports team. Joe Nemechek was the one driver that failed to qualify.

=== Qualifying results ===
Pos	No.	Driver	Team	Manufacturer	Lap Time
1	38	David Gilliland	Front Row Motorsports	Ford	45.153
2	36	Reed Sorenson	Tommy Baldwin Racing	Chevrolet	45.176
3	40	Landon Cassill	Hillman-Circle Sport LLC	Chevrolet	45.182
4	33	Bobby Labonte	Richard Childress Racing-Circle Sport	Chevrolet	45.233
5	48	Jimmie Johnson	Hendrick Motorsports	Chevrolet	45.274
6	20	Matt Kenseth	Joe Gibbs Racing	Toyota	45.277
7	88	Dale Earnhardt Jr.	Hendrick Motorsports	Chevrolet	45.295
8	34	David Ragan	Front Row Motorsports	Ford	45.298
9	24	Jeff Gordon	Hendrick Motorsports	Chevrolet	45.303
10	16	Greg Biffle	Roush Fenway Racing	Ford	45.323
11	99	Carl Edwards	Roush Fenway Racing	Ford	45.333
12	14	Tony Stewart	Stewart–Haas Racing	Chevrolet	45.346
13	4	Kevin Harvick	Stewart–Haas Racing	Chevrolet	45.347
14	5	Kasey Kahne	Hendrick Motorsports	Chevrolet	45.369
15	43	Aric Almirola	Richard Petty Motorsports	Ford	45.401
16	17	Ricky Stenhouse Jr.	Roush Fenway Racing	Ford	45.402
17	26	Cole Whitt (R)	BK Racing	Toyota	45.428
18	9	Marcos Ambrose	Richard Petty Motorsports	Chevrolet	45.431
19	78	Martin Truex Jr.	Furniture Row Racing	Chevrolet	45.439
20	31	Ryan Newman	Richard Childress Racing	Chevrolet	45.441
21	27	Paul Menard	Richard Childress Racing	Chevrolet	45.442
22	13	Casey Mears	Germain Racing	Chevrolet	45.445
23	3	Austin Dillon (R)	Richard Childress Racing	Chevrolet	45.447
24	47	A. J. Allmendinger	JTG Daugherty Racing	Chevrolet	45.451
25	21	Trevor Bayne	Wood Brothers Racing	Ford	45.456
26	2	Brad Keselowski	Team Penske	Ford	45.489
27	95	Michael McDowell	Leavine Family Racing	Ford	45.496
28	22	Joey Logano	Team Penske	Ford	45.514
29	10	Danica Patrick	Stewart–Haas Racing	Chevrolet	45.518
30	55	Brian Vickers	Michael Waltrip Racing	Toyota	45.601
31	51	Justin Allgaier (R)	HScott Motorsports	Chevrolet	45.622
32	7	Michael Annett (R)	Tommy Baldwin Racing	Chevrolet	45.635
33	98	Josh Wise	Phil Parsons Racing	Ford	45.650
34	15	Clint Bowyer	Michael Waltrip Racing	Toyota	45.691
35	42	Kyle Larson (R)	Chip Ganassi Racing	Chevrolet	45.757
36	1	Jamie McMurray	Chip Ganassi Racing	Chevrolet	45.764
37	11	Denny Hamlin	Joe Gibbs Racing	Toyota	45.902
38	32	Terry Labonte	Go FAS Racing	Ford	45.923
39	18	Kyle Busch	Joe Gibbs Racing	Toyota	45.925
40	41	Kurt Busch	Stewart–Haas Racing	Chevrolet	45.971
41	66	Michael Waltrip	Identity Ventures Racing	Toyota	46.066
42	83	Ryan Truex (R) (Note: Ryan Truex started last for unapproved changes post-qualifying.)	BK Racing	Toyota	46.588
43	23	Alex Bowman (R)	BK Racing	Toyota	46.636
Did not qualify
44	29	Joe Nemechek	RAB Racing	Toyota	45.974
Official qualifying results

== Race ==
=== First half ===
==== Start ====
The race was scheduled to start at 7:45 p.m. Eastern time on Saturday evening, but the start was delayed by rain and finally pushed to the next day at 11:13 a.m. The start was pushed a pace lap due to light sprinkles in turns one and two and then another lap. After a total of seven pace laps, David Gilliland finally led the field to the green at 11:21 a.m. Matt Kenseth took the lead from Gilliland on lap five, before the first caution of the race flew for rain on lap 6, which ultimately led to a 26-minute delay under red flag conditions.

==== The Big One ====
The race restarted on lap 13, before Tony Stewart took the lead on lap 17. A competition caution was planned upon the completion of lap 20, but the second caution of the race flew on lap 20 for a multi-car wreck in the tri-oval. A total of 16 cars were involved, including points leader Jeff Gordon, defending race winner Jimmie Johnson and Dale Earnhardt Jr., the Daytona 500 winner. Ricky Stenhouse Jr. – who was also involved in the incident – stated that he had been "heading straight...had it saved and had it straight again and got caught in the left rear." Only Johnson and A. J. Allmendinger were eliminated from the race due to the pileup.

The race restarted on lap 29, before Reed Sorenson, Landon Cassill, David Gilliland and Jamie McMurray took turns at the head of the race, prior to the third caution of the race, on lap 41, due to debris in turn 1. The race restarted on lap 45 with McMurray leading the way. Greg Biffle took the lead on lap 52, while Kurt Busch took the lead on lap 60. Biffle retook the lead on lap 86, before the start of the pit cycle, coming under green flag conditions. Gordon took the lead before it cycled back to Kurt Busch on lap 89. Debris on the backstretch brought out the caution for the fourth time on lap 94.

=== Second half ===
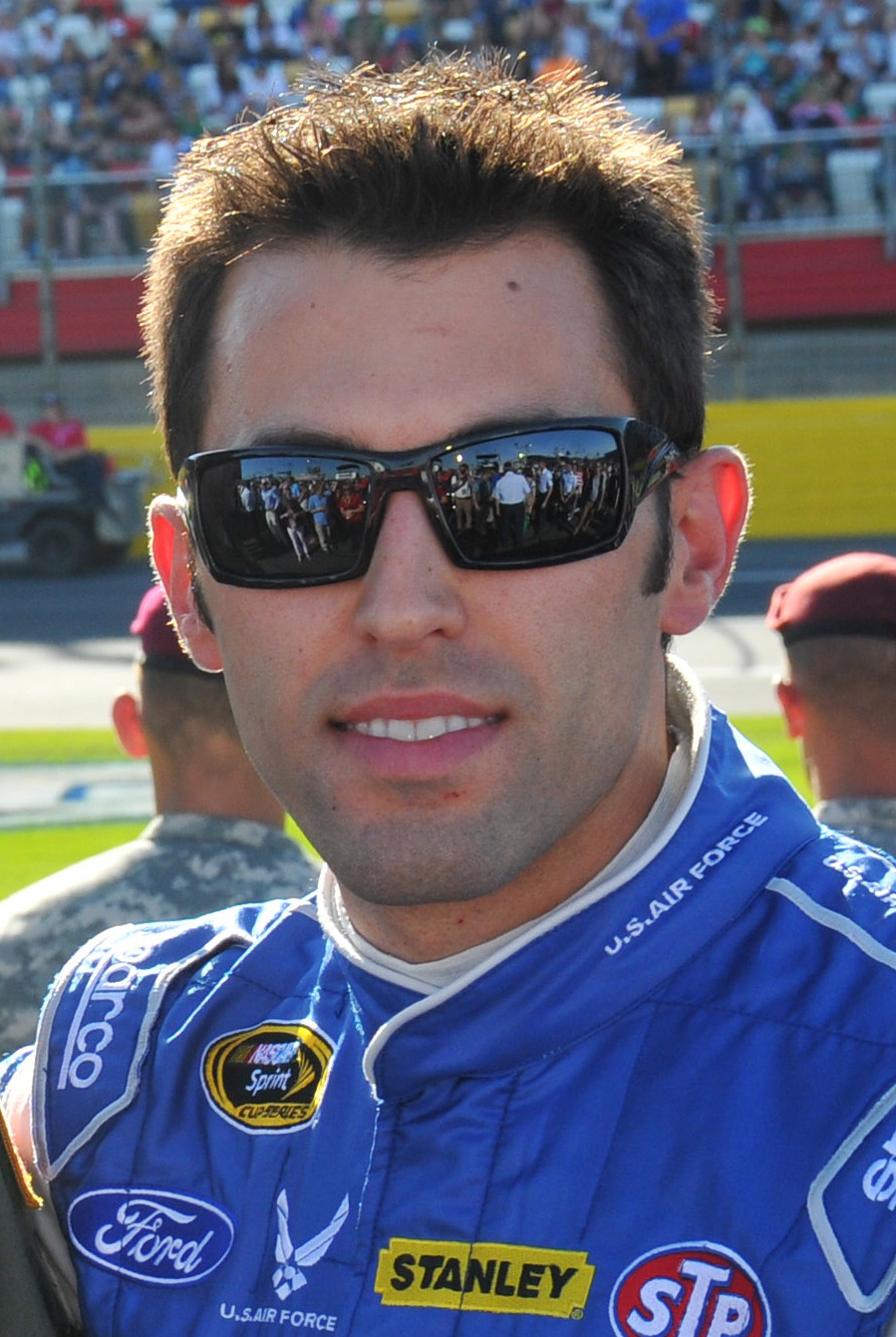
Aric Almirola scored his first career win after rain shortened the race to 112 laps.

==== The Huge One ====
The race restarted on lap 98 and the fifth caution flew for another multi-car wreck on the back straightaway collecting 26 cars. It started when Kasey Kahne got turned by Greg Biffle and Kahne turned down into Joey Logano. Everyone checked up but piled into other cars triggering the wreck. During the wreck, Cole Whitt came down the race track and ended up hitting the right rear of Kyle Busch's car and ended up turning Busch upside down. Busch even joked around while being upside down on his radio saying "Just having a good old time over here" with his spotter responding "Just hanging around?". The red flag was displayed for the second time. The cars involved in the wreck were Kasey Kahne, Greg Biffle, Joey Logano, Cole Whitt, Kyle Busch, Clint Bowyer, Alex Bowman, David Gilliland, Justin Allgaier, Ryan Newman, Paul Menard, Josh Wise, Michael Annett, Ryan Truex, Bobby Labonte, Matt Kenseth, Landon Cassill, Jamie McMurray, Marcos Ambrose, David Ragan, Denny Hamlin, Danica Patrick, Brad Keselowski, Terry Labonte, Reed Sorenson, and Michael McDowell. Gilliland described the incident as "all heck broke loose all at once", while Kyle Busch had driven through the grass before his car dug in and sent him back towards traffic; he described his roll as "real slow", After 4 minutes and 48 seconds, the red flag was lifted and the field continued under caution. Footage from this crash was used in the 2015 film Sharknado 3: Oh Hell No!

==== Mother Nature finally wins ====
The race restarted on lap 105, and it remained green for 5 laps, The sixth caution of the race flew on lap 109 again for rain, and the cars were brought back down pit road as the race was red flagged for the third time. Eventually, NASCAR called the race and Almirola scored his first career win. Almirola's victory was the first for a car numbered 43, since John Andretti did so in the 1999 Goody's Body Pain 500 at Martinsville Speedway. For the first time since the 2007 UAW-DaimlerChrysler 400, all top ten starting drivers failed to finish within the top ten positions.

=== Post-race infractions ===
On the Tuesday following the race, Kurt Busch was penalized 10 points for a technical infraction following post-race inspection. The infraction was a P2 level penalty and a violation of section 12-1 (actions detrimental to stock car racing) and 20–12 (l) (for events at Daytona International Speedway and Talladega Superspeedway, at all times, the Delta (or difference) of the Z-height measurement between the center of the panhard bar mounting bolt located at the left truck trailing arm and the center of the panhard bar mounting bolt, located at the right rear sub-frame mounting bracket, must not exceed three inches) of the 2014 NASCAR rule book.

=== Race results ===
Pos	No.	Driver	Team	Manufacturer	Laps	Points
1	43	Aric Almirola	Richard Petty Motorsports	Ford	112	47
2	55	Brian Vickers	Michael Waltrip Racing	Toyota	112	42
3	41	Kurt Busch	Stewart–Haas Racing	Chevrolet	112	33 (Note: Kurt Busch was penalized 10 points for a technical infraction following post-race inspection.)
4	13	Casey Mears	Germain Racing	Chevrolet	112	41
5	3	Austin Dillon (R)	Richard Childress Racing	Chevrolet	112	39
6	11	Denny Hamlin	Joe Gibbs Racing	Toyota	112	38
7	95	Michael McDowell	Leavine Family Racing	Ford	112	37
8	10	Danica Patrick	Stewart–Haas Racing	Chevrolet	112	36
9	15	Clint Bowyer	Michael Waltrip Racing	Toyota	112	36
10	9	Marcos Ambrose	Richard Petty Motorsports	Ford	112	34
11	32	Terry Labonte	Go FAS Racing	Ford	112	33
12	24	Jeff Gordon	Hendrick Motorsports	Chevrolet	112	33
13	23	Alex Bowman (R)	BK Racing	Toyota	112	31
14	88	Dale Earnhardt Jr.	Hendrick Motorsports	Chevrolet	112	30
15	78	Martin Truex Jr.	Furniture Row Racing	Chevrolet	112	29
16	27	Paul Menard	Richard Childress Racing	Chevrolet	112	28
17	22	Joey Logano	Team Penske	Ford	112	27
18	2	Brad Keselowski	Team Penske	Ford	111	26
19	66	Michael Waltrip	Identity Ventures Racing	Toyota	111	25
20	20	Matt Kenseth	Joe Gibbs Racing	Toyota	111	25
21	7	Michael Annett (R)	Tommy Baldwin Racing	Chevrolet	104	24
22	34	David Ragan	Front Row Motorsports	Ford	102	23
23	98	Josh Wise	Phil Parsons Racing	Ford	101	21
24	31	Ryan Newman	Richard Childress Racing	Chevrolet	100	20
25	51	Justin Allgaier (R)	HScott Motorsports	Chevrolet	98	19
26	33	Bobby Labonte	Richard Childress Racing-Circle Sport	Chevrolet	98	18
27	5	Kasey Kahne	Hendrick Motorsports	Chevrolet	97	17
28	18	Kyle Busch	Joe Gibbs Racing	Toyota	97	16
29	16	Greg Biffle	Roush Fenway Racing	Ford	97	16
30	1	Jamie McMurray	Chip Ganassi Racing	Chevrolet	97	15
31	40	Landon Cassill	Hillman-Circle Sport LLC	Chevrolet	97	0
32	83	Ryan Truex (R)	BK Racing	Toyota	97	12
33	36	Reed Sorenson	Tommy Baldwin Racing	Chevrolet	97	12
34	26	Cole Whitt (R)	BK Racing	Toyota	97	10
35	38	David Gilliland	Front Row Motorsports	Ford	97	10
36	42	Kyle Larson (R)	Chip Ganassi Racing	Chevrolet	69	8
37	99	Carl Edwards	Roush Fenway Racing	Ford	66	7
38	21	Trevor Bayne	Wood Brothers Racing	Ford	46	0
39	4	Kevin Harvick	Stewart–Haas Racing	Chevrolet	46	5
40	14	Tony Stewart	Stewart–Haas Racing	Chevrolet	45	5
41	17	Ricky Stenhouse Jr.	Roush Fenway Racing	Ford	37	3
42	48	Jimmie Johnson	Hendrick Motorsports	Chevrolet	20	2
43	47	A. J. Allmendinger	JTG Daugherty Racing	Chevrolet	19	1

=== Race summary ===
- Lead changes: 21 among different drivers
- Cautions/Laps: 6 for 29
- Red flags: 3 for 1 hour, 30 minutes and 31 seconds
- Time of race: 2 hours, 9 minutes and 13 seconds
- Average speed: 130.014 miles per hour (209.237 km/h)

== Media ==
=== Television ===
TNT Sports
Booth announcers	Pit reporters
Lap-by-lap: Adam Alexander; Color-commentator: Wally Dallenbach Jr. Color commentator: Kyle Petty	Matt Yocum; Marty Snider; Chris Neville; Ralph Sheheen

=== Radio ===
MRN Radio
Booth announcers	Turn announcers	Pit reporters
Lead announcer: Joe Moore; Announcer: Barney Hall Announcer: Jeff Striegle; Guest driver analyst: Chase Elliott	Turns 1 & 2: Dave Moody; Backstretch: Mike Bagley; Turns 3 & 4: Kurt Becker	Winston Kelly; Steve Post; Alex Hayden; Woody Cain

== Standings after the race ==
Drivers' Championship standings

	Pos	Driver	Points
	1	Jeff Gordon	651
1	2	Dale Earnhardt Jr.	624 (−27)
1	3	Jimmie Johnson	596 (−55)
	4	Brad Keselowski	586 (−65)
	5	Matt Kenseth	580 (−71)
1	6	Joey Logano	546 (−105)
1	7	Carl Edwards	543 (−108)
	8	Ryan Newman	534 (−117)
1	9	Kyle Busch	524 (−127)
1	10	Paul Menard	516 (−135)
2	11	Kevin Harvick	514 (−137)
2	12	Clint Bowyer	509 (−142)
5	13	Austin Dillon (R)	494 (−157)
3	14	Denny Hamlin	493 (−158)
2	15	Greg Biffle	490 (−161)
3	16	Brian Vickers	484 (−167)

Manufacturers' Championship standings

Pos	Manufacturer	Points
1	Chevrolet	806
2	Ford	786 (−20)
3	Toyota	723 (−83)

- Note: Only the first sixteen positions are included for the driver standings.

== Notes ==
Previous race: 2014 Quaker State 400	Sprint Cup Series; 2014 season	Next race: 2014 Camping World RV Sales 301
