= RAB Racing =

Former NASCAR team

- Owner(s): Robert A. Benton Sr. Robert A. Benton Jr. Brack Maggard
- Base: Concord, North Carolina
- Series: NASCAR Cup Series; Xfinity Series; Craftsman Truck Series; ARCA Menards Series
- Race drivers: NASCAR Cup Series: 29. Justin Marks, Reed Sorenson; Xfinity Series: 29. Justin Marks, Kenny Wallace
- Manufacturer: Toyota
- Opened: 2005
- Closed: 2015

Career
- Latest race: Xfinity Series: 2015 3M 250 (Iowa); Craftsman Truck Series: 2012 Ford EcoBoost 200 (Homestead); ARCA Menards Series: 2010 American 200 Presented by Black's Tire & Auto Service (Rockingham)
- Drivers' Championships: Total: 0 Xfinity Series: 0 Craftsman Truck Series: 0 ARCA Menards Series: 0
- Race victories: 1 (Xfinity Series)
- Pole positions: 4

RAB Racing with Brack Maggard was an American professional stock car racing team that attempted races in the NASCAR Cup Series, Xfinity Series, Craftsman Truck Series and the ARCA Menards Series. The team was co-owned by Robert A. Benton Sr. and his son Robert Benton Jr. along with Georgia businessman Brack Maggard and ran from 2005 through 2015. The team won one race in the Xfinity Series, but never qualified for a Cup Series race in eight attempts.

Kenny Wallace drove the most Xfinity races for the team with 57 starts, while Boris Said scored the team's only Xfinity win in 2010.

The team shut its doors in 2015.

== NASCAR Cup Series ==
=== Car No. 29 history ===
RAB Racing entered the No. 09 Cup car for Kenny Wallace in the 2012 Daytona 500 with sponsorship from American Ethanol. The team suffered ECU problems in the Duels and failed to qualify. RAB Racing next fielded a Cup car at the 2014 Coke Zero 400. Joe Nemechek attempted qualify the No. 29, but did not qualify. Later in the summer, Matt Crafton attempted to make both his and RAB's first Cup race in the No. 29 at Indianapolis for the Brickyard 400, but posted the slowest time and failed to qualify. In the GEICO 500, RAB made their third attempt of the season with the No. 29, once again using Nemechek. Despite initially running 24th after making it to round two but declining to run in the round, they failed to qualify again after the car failed post-qualifying inspection.

Justin Marks attempted to qualify the No. 29 for the 2015 Daytona 500, bringing American Born Moonshine on board as part of a package deal across all three national series at Daytona. RAB also announced its plans to attempt the full Cup Series schedule. However, Marks failed to qualify. Reed Sorenson joined the team for the Folds of Honor QuikTrip 500, but failed to qualify after the No. 29 was one of thirteen cars that was unable to clear pre-qualifying inspection in time to make a run. Sorenson then missed the next race at Las Vegas. RAB withdrew from Phoenix but announced they would return at Auto Club, where Sorenson once again failed to qualify.

RAB never once qualified for a race after 8 Cup attempts during the team's existence.

=== Car No. 29 results ===
NASCAR Sprint Cup Series results
Year	Driver	No.	Make	1	2	3	4	5	6	7	8	9	10	11	12	13	14	15	16	17	18	19	20	21	22	23	24	25	26	27	28	29	30	31	32	33	34	35	36	Owners	Pts
2012	Kenny Wallace	09	Toyota	DAY; DNQ	PHO	LVS	BRI	CAL	MAR	TEX	KAN	RCH	TAL	DAR	CLT	DOV	POC	MCH	SON	KEN	DAY	NHA	IND	POC	GLN	MCH	BRI	ATL	RCH	CHI	NHA	DOV	TAL	CLT	KAN	MAR	TEX	PHO	HOM	60th	0
2014	Joe Nemechek	29	Toyota	DAY	PHO	LVS	BRI	CAL	MAR	TEX	DAR	RCH	TAL	KAN	CLT	DOV	POC	MCH	SON	KEN	DAY; DNQ	NHA													TAL; DNQ	MAR	TEX	PHO	HOM	52nd	0
2014	Matt Crafton	29	Toyota																				IND; DNQ	POC	GLN	MCH	BRI	ATL	RCH	CHI	NHA	DOV	KAN	CLT						52nd	0
2015	Justin Marks	29	Toyota	DAY; DNQ																																				50th	0
2015	Reed Sorenson	29	Toyota		ATL; DNQ	LVS; DNQ	PHO; Wth	CAL; DNQ	MAR	TEX	BRI	RCH	TAL	KAN	CLT	DOV	POC	MCH	SON	DAY	KEN	NHA	IND	POC	GLN	MCH	BRI	DAR	RCH	CHI	NHA	DOV	CLT	KAN	TAL	MAR	TEX	PHO	HOM	50th	0

== Xfinity Series ==
=== Car No. 29 history ===
The second RAB car made its debut at the STP 300 at Chicago in 2012 as the second iteration of the No. 09. Kenny Wallace, who gave up his seat in the team's full-time 99 car due to lack of sponsorship, finished 4th in the race. In 2013, Wallace returned to drive a limited schedule of races in the renumbered 29 car. Alex Bowman, the full-time driver of the main No. 99 car, was set to drive one of two RAB cars at the season finale at Homestead, but his sponsor pulled out and the team released him.

In 2014, Scott Lagasse Jr. drove at both Daytona races with "Alert Today, Alive Tomorrow" as the sponsor. Kenny Wallace ran a single race at Iowa Speedway with U.S. Cellular as his sponsor, starting and finishing 19th. Kelly Admiraal ran three races with a best finish of 22nd twice. In August, Milka Duno signed with the team to run select events, only qualifying for two races out of five attempts (Duno ran the season-finale at Homestead using the owners points of NEMCO Motorsports and Rick Ware Racing's 87 team). Joe Gibbs Racing driver Daniel Suárez ran the 29 with sponsor Arris Group at Chicagoland Speedway in September, scoring a season's-best 15th-place finish.

In 2015, Justin Marks ran the season-opening race at Daytona with sponsor American Born Moonshine, qualifying on the outside pole, but finishing 34th after a crash. Kenny Wallace returned with the team at Iowa Speedway with the sponsorship U.S. Cellular, finishing 23rd. This would be the team's final race as they later shut down their operations for the rest of the season.

=== Car No. 29 results ===
NASCAR Xfinity Series results
Year	Driver	No.	Make	1	2	3	4	5	6	7	8	9	10	11	12	13	14	15	16	17	18	19	20	21	22	23	24	25	26	27	28	29	30	31	32	33	Owners	Pts
2012	Kenny Wallace	09	Toyota	DAY	PHO	LVS	BRI	CAL	TEX	RCH	TAL	DAR	IOW	CLT	DOV	MCH	ROA	KEN	DAY	NHA	CHI; 4	IND	IOW	GLN	CGV	BRI	ATL	RCH	CHI	KEN	DOV	CLT	KAN	TEX	PHO	HOM	69th	-6
2013	Kenny Wallace	29	Toyota	DAY	PHO	LVS	BRI	CAL	TEX	RCH; 36	TAL	DAR	CLT; 29	DOV	IOW; 13	MCH	ROA	KEN	DAY	NHA	CHI	IND	IOW; 22	GLN	MOH	BRI; 19	ATL	RCH; 17	CHI; 17	KEN	DOV	KAN	CLT	TEX	PHO	HOM	42nd	155
2014	Scott Lagasse Jr.	29	Toyota	DAY; 26	PHO	LVS													DAY; 31	NHA	CHI	IND															42nd	142
2014	Kelly Admiraal	29	Toyota				BRI; 35	CAL	TEX	DAR	RCH	TAL	IOW	CLT	DOV	MCH	ROA	KEN										RCH; 22							PHO; 22	HOM	42nd	142
2014	Kenny Wallace	29	Toyota																				IOW; 19	GLN	MOH												42nd	142
2014	Milka Duno	29	Toyota																							BRI; DNQ	ATL				DOV; DNQ	KAN; 40	CLT; Wth	TEX			42nd	142
2014	Daniel Suárez	29	Toyota																										CHI; 15	KEN							42nd	142
2015	Justin Marks	29	Toyota	DAY; 34	ATL	LVS	PHO	CAL	TEX	BRI	RCH	TAL																									49th	31
2015	Kenny Wallace	29	Toyota										IOW; 23	CLT	DOV	MCH	CHI	DAY	KEN	NHA	IND	IOW	GLN	MOH	BRI	ROA	DAR	RCH	CHI	KEN	DOV	CLT	KAN	TEX	PHO	HOM	49th	31

=== Car No. 99 History ===
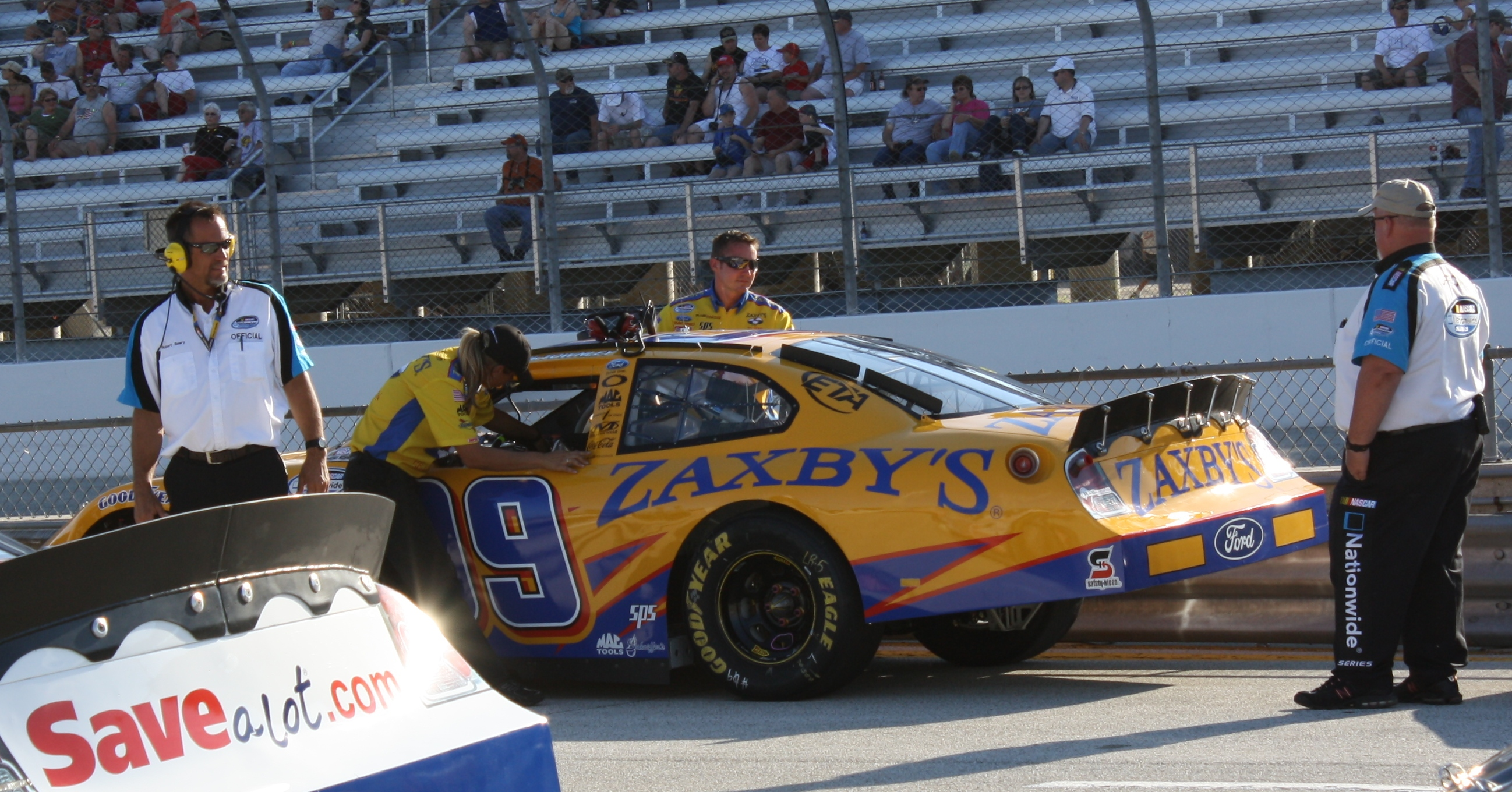
John Wes Townley's Zaxby's Ford in 2009.

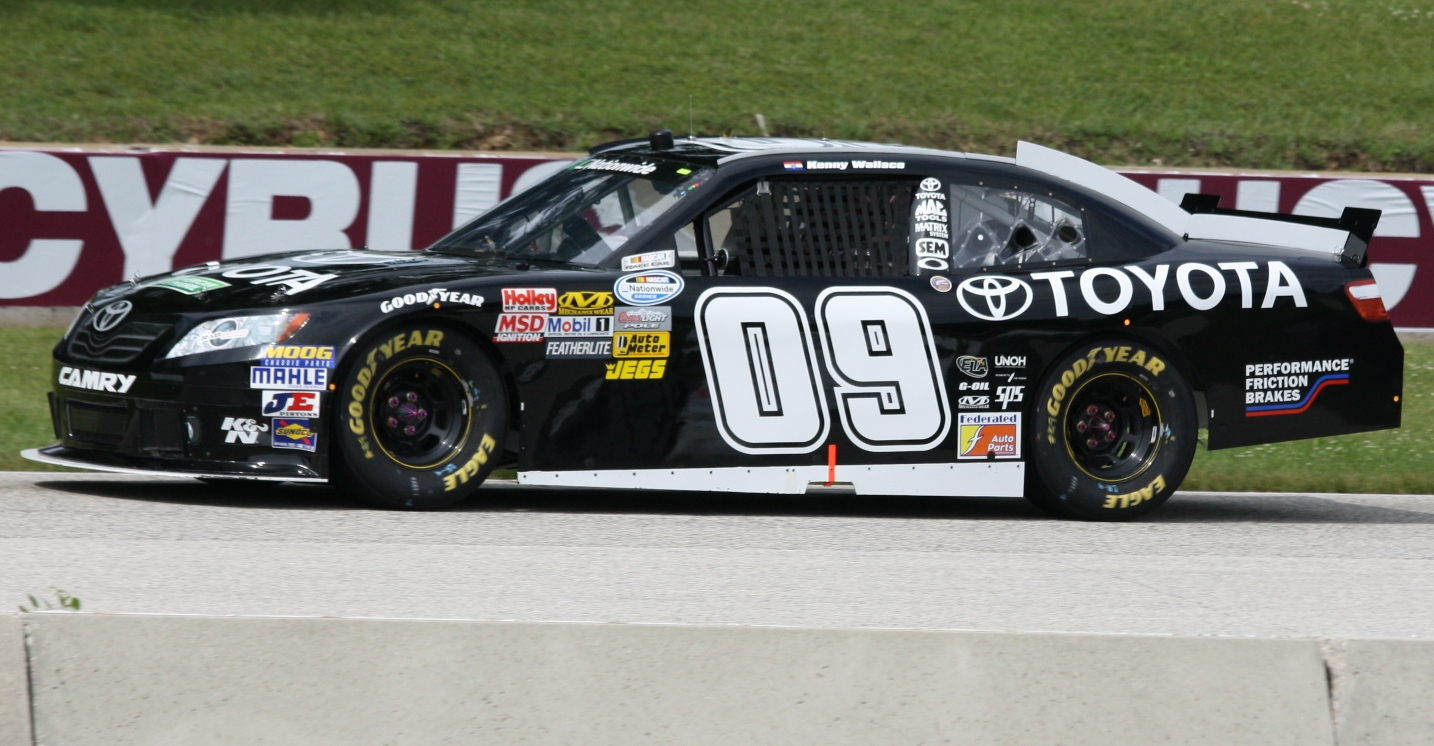
Kenny Wallace in 2011.

RAB moved up from the ARCA Racing Series to the NASCAR Nationwide Series for 2008, hiring John Wes Townley to drive seven races (in addition to the full ARCA schedule). Townley brought his family's Zaxby's sponsorship on board, and team changed manufacturers to Ford. Townley's new number would be 09. The team qualified for only three of their 7 scheduled races, with a best finish of 27th in Charlotte.

In 2009, RAB moved up to the Nationwide Series full-time, running with Townley for Rookie of the Year honors. Townley had a decent year, finishing 23rd in points but amassing no top-15 finishes. Also in 2009, RAB hired Boris Said to run at Watkins Glen and Montreal with a best finish of 11th at The Glen. Travis Kvapil ran at Richmond and finished 20th.

Townley left RAB at the end of 2009 for Richard Childress Racing, and the team announced it would run as much of the 2010 season as possible with Scott Riggs. However, the team only ran the first five races of the year before replacing Riggs with many other drivers including Jason Bowles, Chad McCumbee, Patrick Sheltra, Hermie Sadler, Sean Caisse, Robb Brent, Ken Schrader, Kevin Hamlin, and Landon Cassill. "Road Course Ringer" Boris Said drove for RAB at Watkins Glen and Montreal. In Montreal at Circuit Gilles Villeneuve, Said held off another road course ace, Max Papis, in a photo finish to give RAB its first win in any division. Townley returned to the team for a few races, but left before Richmond. The team then hired former Braun Racing driver Brian Scott to drive the No. 09 car at Kansas. Scott drove the rest of the season and finished runner-up to Ricky Stenhouse Jr. for ROTY. Scott left for Joe Gibbs Racing at the end of the season.

For 2011, the team hired veteran Kenny Wallace from Jay Robinson Racing, with Wallace driving without salary in exchange for being in good equipment. Wallace brought sponsorship from Family Farmers/American Ethanol, University of Northwestern Ohio, and Federated Auto Parts. Wallace and RAB would take home 11 top-10s and finish 7th in points. For 2012, Wallace returned to the team for the first few races with sponsorship from American Ethanol/Family Farmers. After campaigning for weeks, he was forced to run a part-time schedule due to sponsorship issues. Meanwhile, the 09 was renumbered 99 in a deal with Michael Waltrip Racing to allow Travis Pastrana to run his seven scheduled Nationwide races. The rest of the year was split among Wallace, Townley, Ryan Truex (former driver of the 99 with MWR), Alex Bowman, Victor Gonzalez Jr., Patrick Carpentier and Brett Moffitt (also MWR drivers). Wallace would grab the team's best finish of 4th at Chicagoland.

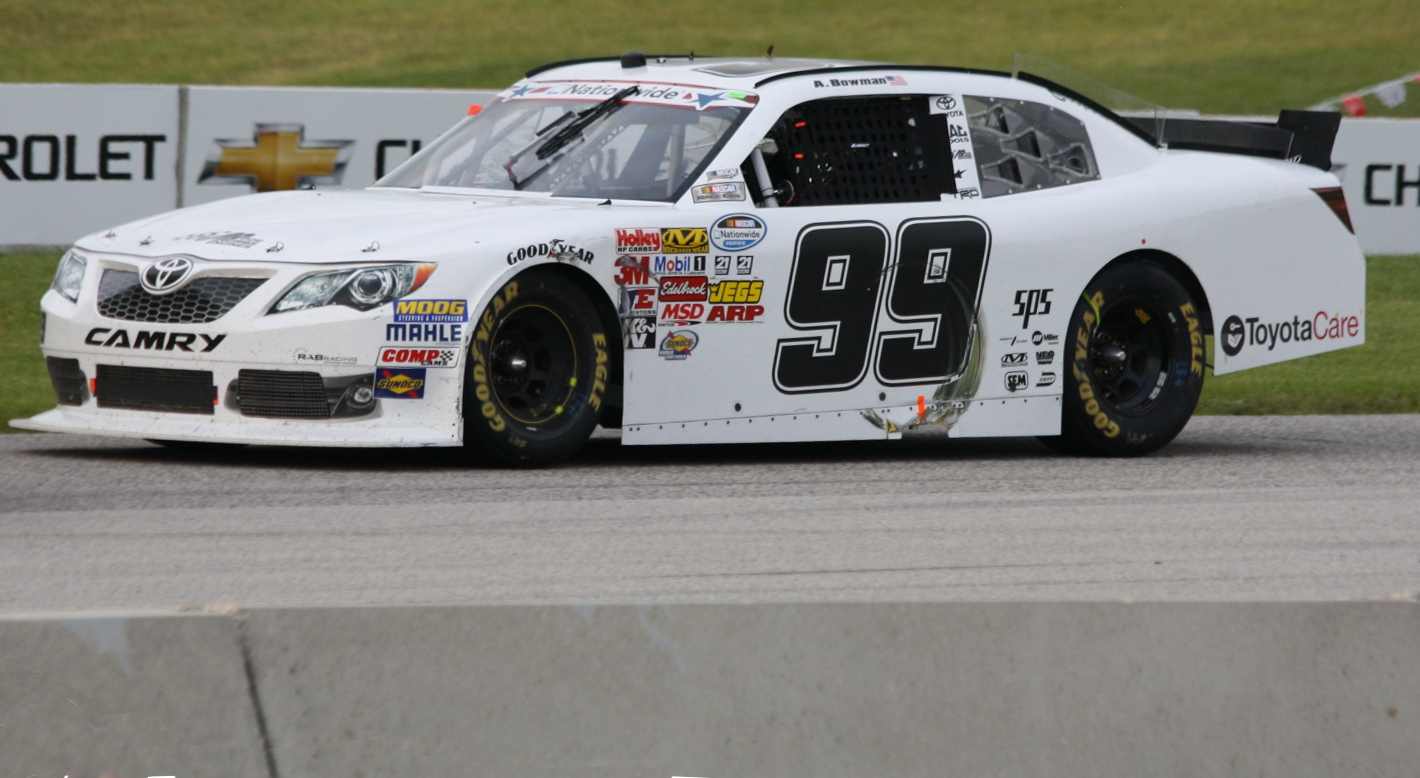
Alex Bowman driving the No. 99 at Road America in 2013

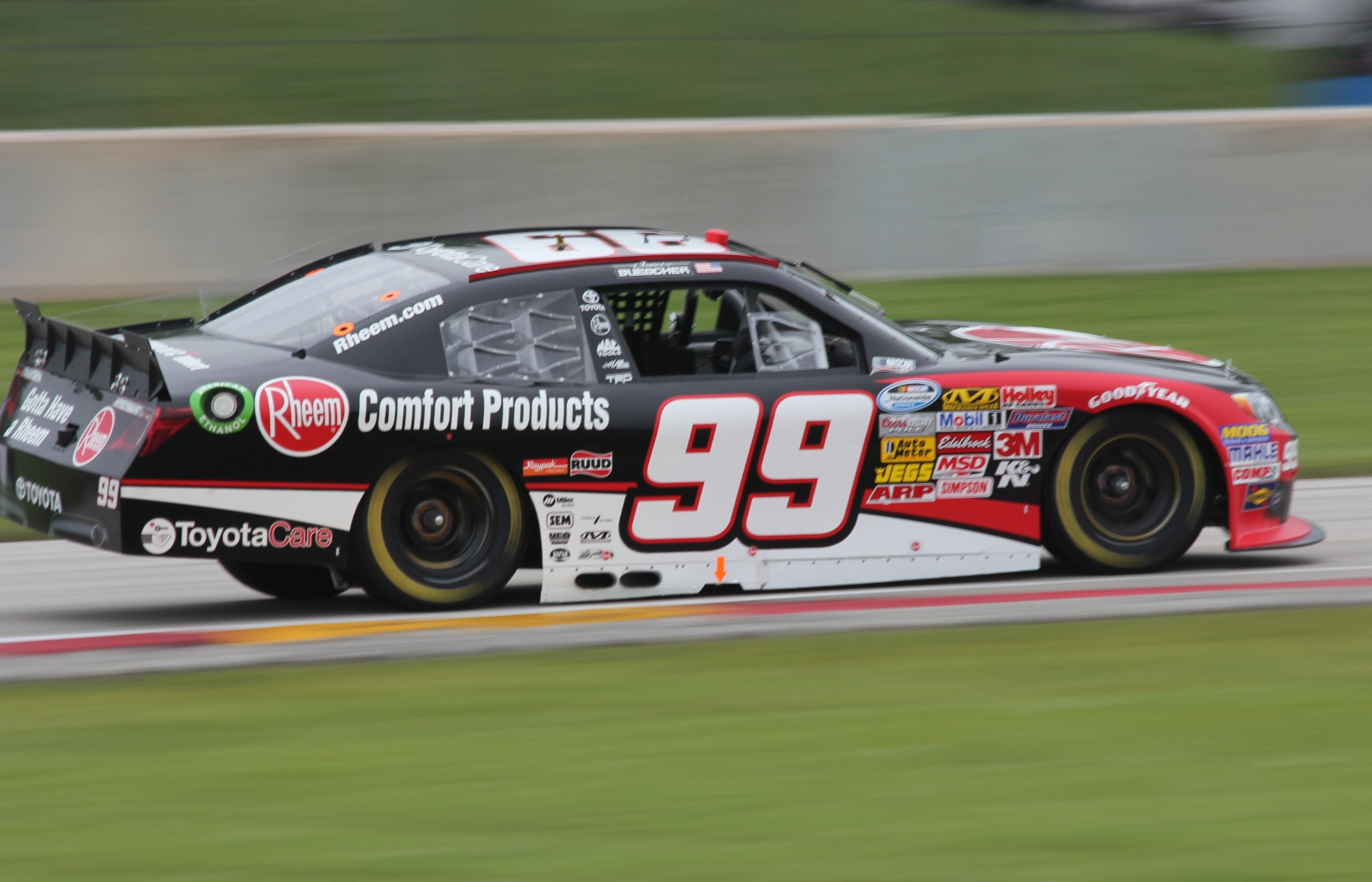
James Buescher racing the No. 99 in 2014

In January 2013, it was announced that Alex Bowman would be running the full 2013 Nationwide Series season for RAB Racing, competing for Rookie of the Year honors. In April, he would win his first career Nationwide pole at the O'Reilly Auto Parts 300 at Texas. He would sweep the poles at Texas but would be released prior to the season finale at Homestead-Miami due to lack of sponsorship. Blake Koch would drive the 99 at Homestead to a 13th-place finish.

For 2014, former Camping World Truck Series champion James Buescher left Turner Scott Motorsports to run the full season in the No. 99 car, bringing sponsor Rheem. After the Drive to Stop Diabetes 300 at Bristol, the 99 was penalized for violating two sections of the NASCAR rulebook: 12-1 (actions detrimental to stock car racing) and 20A-2.3A (added car weight; improperly attached weight; loss of weight during the event); crew chief Chris Rice and car chief John Guerra were placed on probation until December 31, the former also being fined $10,000. Buescher struggled throughout the season, posting only two top 10s and finishing 10th in points. The team was forced to shut down after Rheem left for Richard Childress Racing.

=== Car No. 99 results ===
NASCAR Xfinity Series results
Year	Driver	No.	Make	1	2	3	4	5	6	7	8	9	10	11	12	13	14	15	16	17	18	19	20	21	22	23	24	25	26	27	28	29	30	31	32	33	34	35	Owners	Pts
2008	John Wes Townley	09	Ford	DAY	CAL	LVS	ATL	BRI	NSH	TEX	PHO	MXC	TAL	RCH	DAR	CLT	DOV	NSH	KEN	MLW	NHA	DAY	CHI	GTY	IRP	CGV	GLN	MCH	BRI; DNQ	CAL	RCH	DOV; 30	KAN	CLT; 27	MEM; DNQ	TEX; DNQ	PHO; 38	HOM; DNQ	57th	298
2009	John Wes Townley	09	Ford	DAY; 21	CAL; 22	LVS; 38	BRI; 16	TEX; 36	NSH; 18	PHO; 36	TAL; 18	RCH; DNQ	DAR; 34	CLT; DNQ	DOV; 38	NSH; 42	KEN; 32	MLW; DNQ	NHA; 28	DAY; 36	CHI; 21	GTY; 21	IRP; DNQ	IOW; 29		MCH; DNQ	BRI; 33		ATL; DNQ		DOV; 18	KAN; 31	CAL; 17	CLT; 28	MEM; 40	TEX; 18	PHO; 23	HOM; 24	32nd	2436
2009	Boris Said	09	Ford																						GLN; 11			CGV; 25											32nd	2436
2009	Travis Kvapil	09	Ford																											RCH; 20									32nd	2436
2010	Scott Riggs	09	Ford	DAY; 15	CAL; 16	LVS; 14	BRI; DNQ	NSH; 19																															24th	3297
2010	Jason Bowles	09	Ford						PHO; 25																														24th	3297
2010	Chad McCumbee	09	Ford							TEX; 31			DAR; 28	DOV; 32	CLT; 27																								24th	3297
2010	Patrick Sheltra	09	Ford								TAL; 18																												24th	3297
2010	Hermie Sadler	09	Ford									RCH; 32																											24th	3297
2010	Sean Caisse	09	Ford													NSH; 18	KEN; 27		NHA; 21																				24th	3297
2010	Robb Brent	09	Ford															ROA; 30																					24th	3297
2010	Ken Schrader	09	Ford																	DAY; 25																			24th	3297
2010	Landon Cassill	09	Ford																		CHI; 33	GTY; 31								RCH; 28									24th	3297
2010	Kevin Hamlin	09	Ford																				IRP; 27																24th	3297
2010	John Wes Townley	09	Ford																					IOW; 24		MCH; 17	BRI; 27		ATL; 22										24th	3297
2010	Boris Said	09	Ford																						GLN; 22			CGV; 1											24th	3297
2010	Kelly Bires	09	Ford																												DOV; 21								24th	3297
2010	Brian Scott	09	Ford																													KAN; 21	CAL; 15	CLT; 28	GTY; 14				24th	3297
2010	Brian Scott	09	Toyota																																	TEX; 32	PHO; 11	HOM; 18	24th	3297
2011	Kenny Wallace	09	Toyota	DAY; 28	PHO; 10	LVS; 10	BRI; 17	CAL; 15	TEX; 20	TAL; 25	NSH; 12	RCH; 13	DAR; 11	DOV; 7	IOW; 6	CLT; 20	CHI; 7	MCH; 20	ROA; 28	DAY; 7	KEN; 6	NHA; 6	NSH; 10	IRP; 12	IOW; 7	GLN; 32	CGV; 16	BRI; 36	ATL; 19	RCH; 5	CHI; 17	DOV; 16	KAN; 19	CLT; 16	TEX; 13	PHO; 17	HOM; 33		14th	963
2012	Kenny Wallace	09	Toyota	DAY; 30	PHO; 36	LVS; 11	BRI; 33	CAL; 7																															18th	768
2012	Kenny Wallace	99	Toyota								TAL; 9					MCH; 34		KEN; 11											CHI; 20				KAN; 18	TEX; 15		HOM; 15			18th	768
2012	Ryan Truex	09	Toyota						TEX; 32																														18th	768
2012	Ryan Truex	99	Toyota																									RCH; 14			DOV; 16								18th	768
2012	Travis Pastrana	99	Toyota							RCH; 22		DAR; 17	IOW; 26	CLT; 24						NHA; 31	CHI; 17	IND; 13					ATL; 26												18th	768
2012	John Wes Townley	99	Toyota												DOV; 20				DAY; 25							BRI; 23							CLT; 32						18th	768
2012	Victor Gonzalez Jr.	99	Toyota														ROA; 17							GLN; 16															18th	768
2012	Brett Moffitt	99	Toyota																				IOW; 9																18th	768
2012	Patrick Carpentier	99	Toyota																						CGV; 29														18th	768
2012	Alex Bowman	99	Toyota																											KEN; 25					PHO; 15				18th	768
2013	Alex Bowman	99	Toyota	DAY; 3	PHO; 31	LVS; 8	BRI; 14	CAL; 12	TEX; 14	RCH; 27	TAL; 13	DAR; 17	CLT; 20	DOV; 17	IOW; 22	MCH; 14	ROA; 24	KEN; 10	DAY; 20	NHA; 10	CHI; 31	IND; 15	IOW; 7	GLN; 13	MOH; 11	BRI; 33	ATL; 34	RCH; 15	CHI; 11	KEN; 5	DOV; 18	KAN; 11	CLT; 18	TEX; 18	PHO; 11				16th	917
2013	Blake Koch	99	Toyota																																	HOM; 11			16th	917
2014	James Buescher	99	Toyota	DAY; 16	PHO; 12	LVS; 18	BRI; 13	CAL; 16	TEX; 13	DAR; 25	RCH; 10	TAL; 29	IOW; 19	CLT; 11	DOV; 15	MCH; 15	ROA; 17	KEN; 14	DAY; 14	NHA; 22	CHI; 23	IND; 21	IOW; 26	GLN; 11	MOH; 25	BRI; 9	ATL; 19	RCH; 19	CHI; 18	KEN; 14	DOV; 15	KAN; 21	CLT; 31	TEX; 24	PHO; 14	HOM; 18			15th	868

== Craftsman Truck Series ==
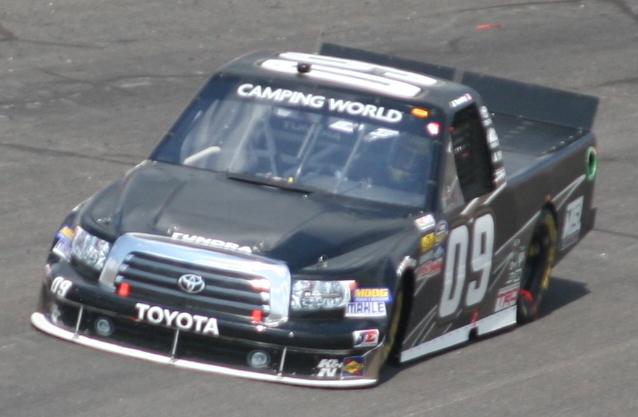
John Wes Townley at Rockingham Speedway in 2012

For 2012, RAB formed a Craftsman Truck Series team with longtime driver John Wes Townley, using the number 09. However, Townley was cited with a DUI before Speedweeks, resulting in his suspension by RAB. Townley was replaced by Travis Kvapil for Daytona. Townley returned the next race, at Martinsville. After competing for Rookie of the Year honors in 2012 and collecting his best series finish of eighth at Pocono Raceway, Townley left the team and joined Red Horse Racing for 2013.

=== Truck No. 09 results ===
NASCAR Camping World Truck Series results
Year	Driver	No.	Make	1	2	3	4	5	6	7	8	9	10	11	12	13	14	15	16	17	18	19	20	21	22	Owners	Pts
2012	Travis Kvapil	09	Toyota	DAY; 4																						17th	561
2012	John Wes Townley	09	Toyota		MAR; 23	CAR; 20	KAN; 16	CLT; 16	DOV; 16	TEX; 27	KEN; 31	IOW; 20	CHI; 14	POC; 8	MCH; 25	BRI; 24	ATL; 19	IOW; 15	KEN; 10	LVS; 14	TAL; 25	MAR; 18	TEX; 16	PHO; 13	HOM; 32	17th	561

== ARCA Menards Series ==
After leaving the drivers seat and having an eight-year stint as a crew member for Robert Yates Racing, Robert Benton decided to start his own race team in 2005 in the ARCA RE/Max Series. The team first hired young Georgia native Walt Brannen to drive their No. 65 for a few races with little success. Brannen was released as RAB stepped up to a full-time schedule with Justin Marks and Damon Lusk splitting the No. 65 Construct Corps/Crocs Dodge. The duo would earn a pole, two top fives and nine top tens. Marks ran the full 2007 season with RAB and ended the season fifth in points with a pole, four top fives, and ten top tens. Marks would move to Germain Racing in the Craftsman Truck Series for 2008.

For 2008, John Wes Townley ran the renumbered 09 car with sponsor Zaxby's, scoring 8 top tens and ending the season 7th in points. Townley ran the two restrictor plate races in 2009, with a best finish of 4th at Daytona. Grant Enfinger and Tom Hessert III also ran races in the car.

== See also ==
- Tyler Allen – RAB Racing engineer
