= Justin Marks =

American racing driver (born 1981)

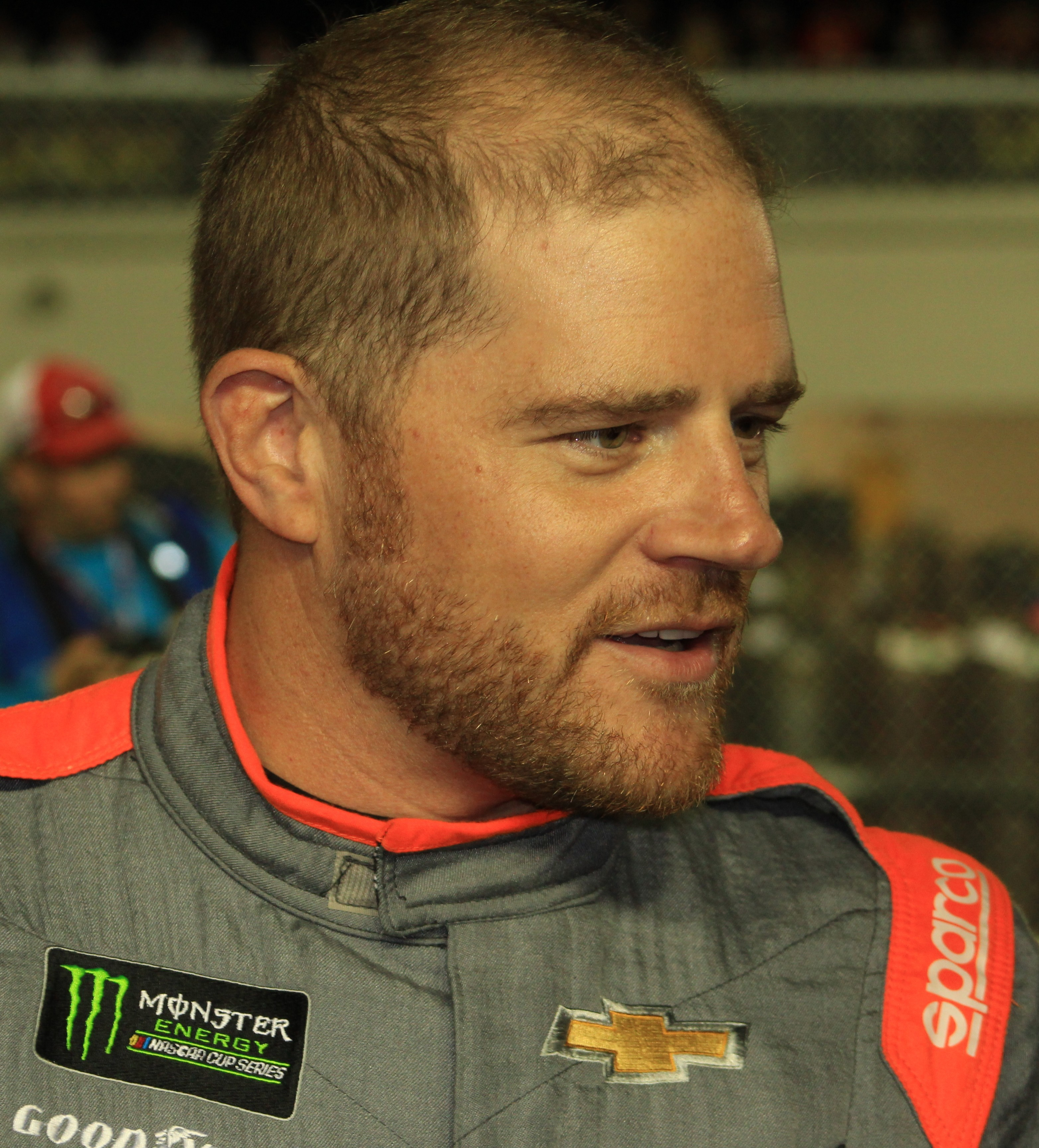
- Marks at the 2018 Daytona 500
- Born: March 25, 1981 (age 45); St. Louis, Missouri, U.S.
- Awards: West Coast Stock Car Hall of Fame (2025)

NASCAR Cup Series career
- 6 races run over 4 years
- 2018 position: 52nd
- Best finish: 46th (2013)
- First race: 2013 Toyota/Save Mart 350 (Sonoma)
- Last race: 2018 Bank of America Roval 400 (Charlotte Roval)
Wins	Top tens	Poles
0	0	0

NASCAR O'Reilly Auto Parts Series career
- 36 races run over 10 years
- 2023 position: 70th
- Best finish: 23rd (2016)
- First race: 2008 NAPA Auto Parts 200 (Montreal)
- Last race: 2023 The Loop 121 (Chicago)
- First win: 2016 Mid-Ohio Challenge (Mid-Ohio)
Wins	Top tens	Poles
1	7	0

NASCAR FedEx Freight Truck Series career
- 40 races run over 8 years
- 2026 position: 79th
- Best finish: 23rd (2008, 2011)
- First race: 2007 Easy Care Vehicle Service Contracts 200 (Atlanta)
- Last race: 2026 Navy 250 (Coronado)
Wins	Top tens	Poles
0	4	2
- Statistics up to date as of November 6, 2026.

Justin Marks (born March 25, 1981) is an American semi-retired racing driver, entrepreneur, and owner of Trackhouse Racing in the NASCAR Cup Series. He last competed part-time in the NASCAR Craftsman Truck Series, driving the No. 77 Chevrolet Silverado RST for Spire Motorsports.

Marks has competed in sports car and stock car racing, competing in the NASCAR Cup Series, NASCAR Xfinity Series and the ARCA Racing Series, sometimes serving as a road course ringer.

== Early years ==
Marks was born in St. Louis, Missouri. During his youth, he went with his grandfather (who lived in Iowa), to see local Midwest racers such as Dick Trickle, Ken Schrader, and the Wallace brothers battle on dirt tracks. His family moved to Menlo Park, California, when Marks was eight. Marks attended race school while in high school and in 1998 competed in his first race, in the street stock division at Altamont Raceway Park in Tracy, California. At the same time as his racing career was beginning, he was attending California State University with the intention of obtaining a degree in sports marketing. Marks withdrew from college fourteen credits shy of completing his degree to focus on racing.

== Racing career ==
=== Sports car racing ===
At the age of eighteen, Marks entered the SCCA Regional Racing Series, and later the Speed World Challenge Series. With success in the SCCA, Marks moved to the Rolex Sports Car Series GT Class in 2004 where he met good friend Joey Hand. Switching between the GT class and the World Challenge, Marks racked up four wins, eight podiums, and thirteen top tens between the two series. In 2005 Marks again raced in the Rolex Sports Car Series where he won three races with teammate Hand. At the same time, Marks teamed with Bill Auberlen in the Continental Tire Sports Car Challenge for Turner Motorsport, finishing third in points with five poles and five wins in nine starts.

=== NASCAR ===
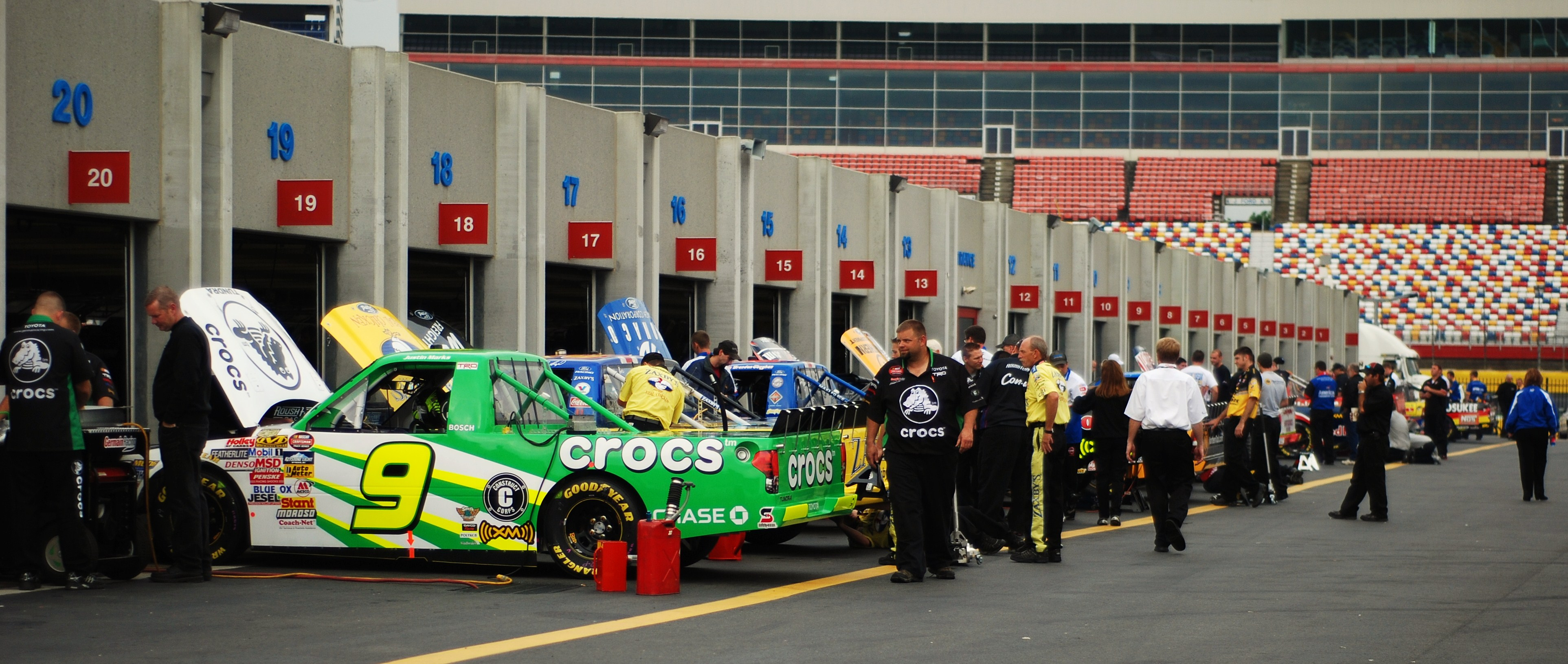
Marks' No. 9 truck for Germain Racing in the garage at Lowe's Motor Speedway in 2008.

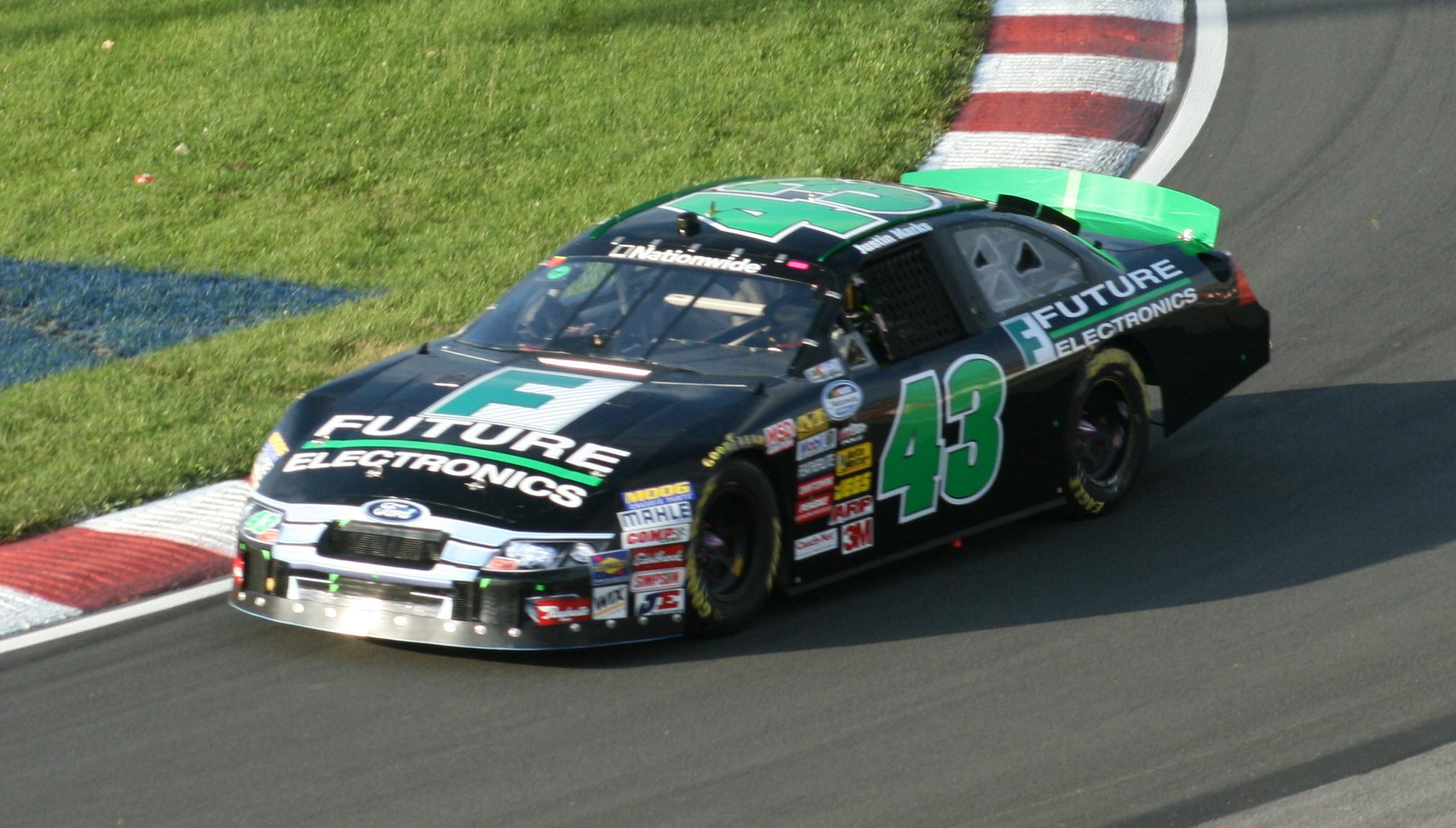
Marks during qualifying for the 2010 NAPA Auto Parts 200 at Circuit Gilles Villeneuve.

In 2006, Marks left road racing to pursue a career in NASCAR. In 2006, Marks raced for RAB Racing in the ARCA RE/MAX Series, driving their No. 65. Although he did not pick up any wins in his two years there, Marks turned many heads with his driving ability. In 2007 he was picked up by Germain Racing of the Craftsman Truck Series to drive their No. 03 truck. Marks again impressed many with an eighth-place finish at Homestead-Miami Speedway. This cemented his future as the driver of the No. 9 Crocs/Construct Corps Toyota for 2008, running for Rookie of the Year.

In 2008, Marks raced in the Truck Series, the Nationwide Series, and the ARCA RE/MAX Series for a number of teams. He won the pole position for the NASCAR Craftsman Truck Series race at Texas Motor Speedway as well as the ARCA RE/MAX Series season opener at Daytona International Speedway. Marks returned to the Camping World Truck Series for 2011, driving for Turn One Racing in the No. 66 Chevrolet.

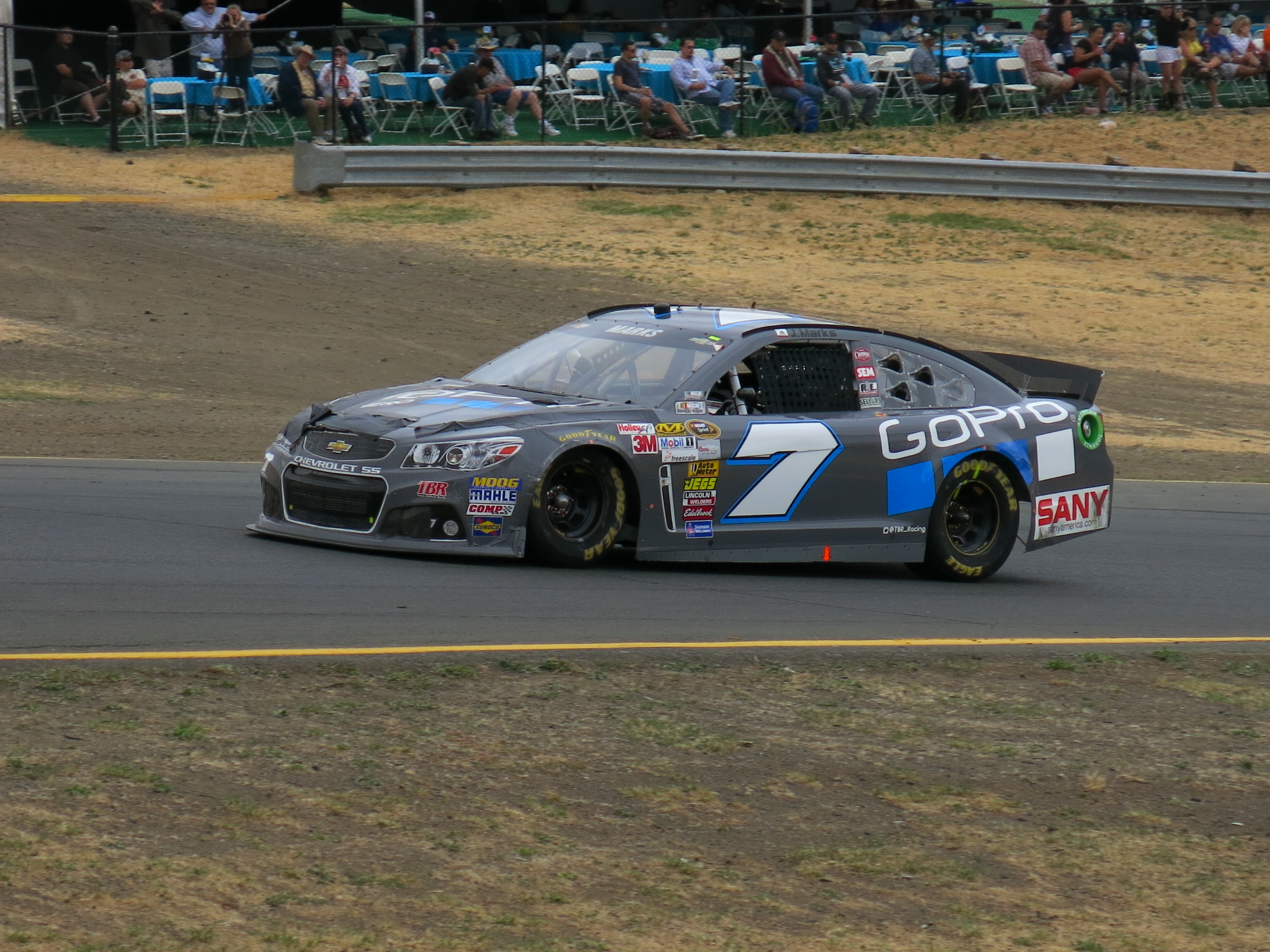
Marks during the 2013 Toyota/Save Mart 350

In 2013, Marks made his Sprint Cup Series debut at Sonoma Raceway in the 2013 Toyota/Save Mart 350, driving the No. 7 of Tommy Baldwin Racing, substituting for Dave Blaney. Marks had little experience in the Generation 6 cars, having run the cars only once in a road course test at Virginia International Raceway.

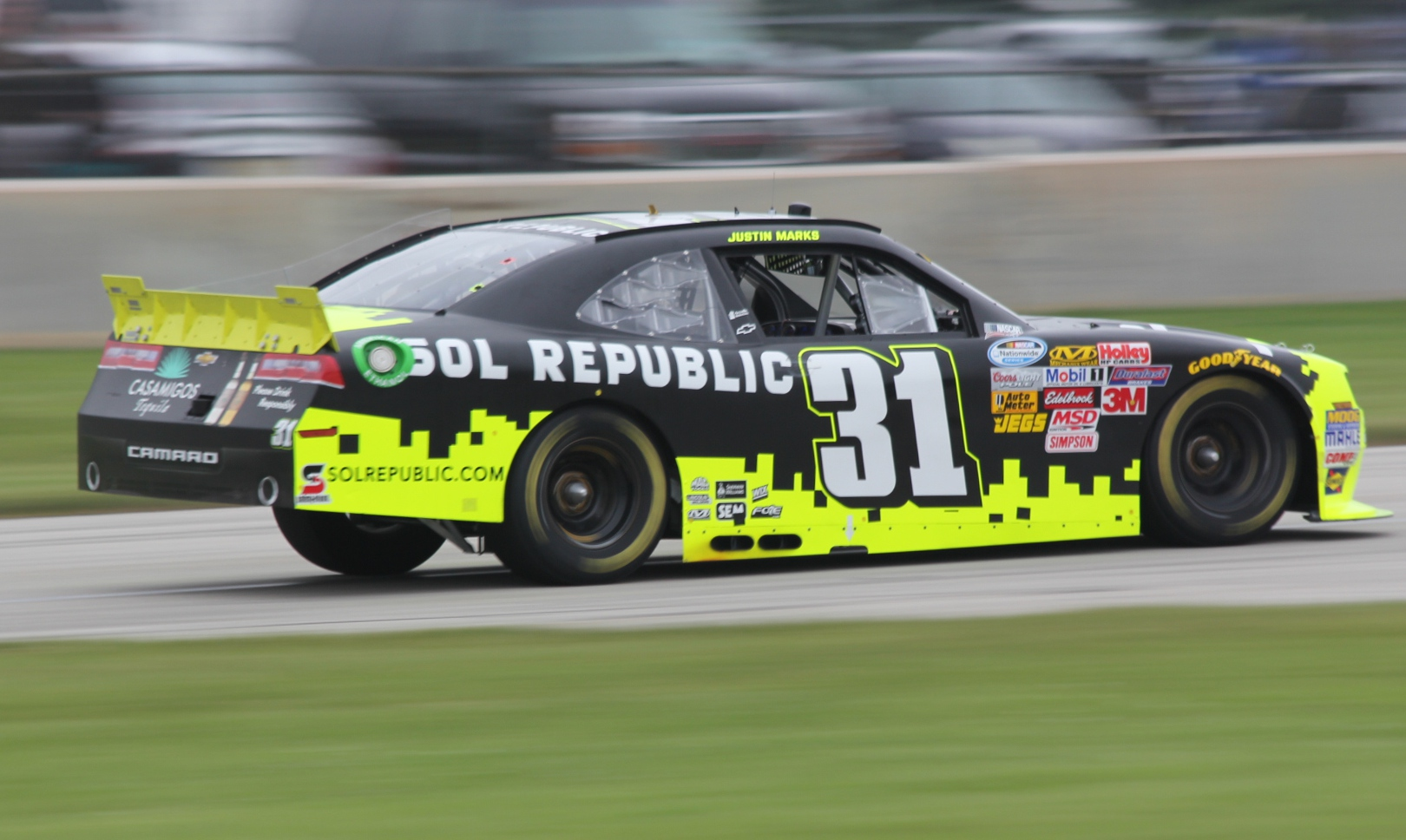
Marks racing at Road America in 2014.

The following year, Marks was signed by Turner Scott Motorsports to run the No. 31 in the Nationwide Series at Road America and Mid-Ohio Sports Car Course.

On February 10, Marks announced he would return to the Cup Series in 2015, driving the No. 29 for RAB Racing in the Daytona 500, while also running the No. 29 in the Xfinity Series and the No. 35 with Win-Tron Racing in the other Daytona races. However, Marks failed to qualify for the 500, and crashed out of both the Xfinity and Truck races, finishing last in the latter. In June, he joined Front Row Motorsports for the Toyota/Save Mart 350.

In the summer of 2015, Marks ran the road course races at Road America and Mid-Ohio in the Xfinity Series, driving the No. 42 Chevrolet for Chip Ganassi Racing, owned by Harry Scott, Jr.

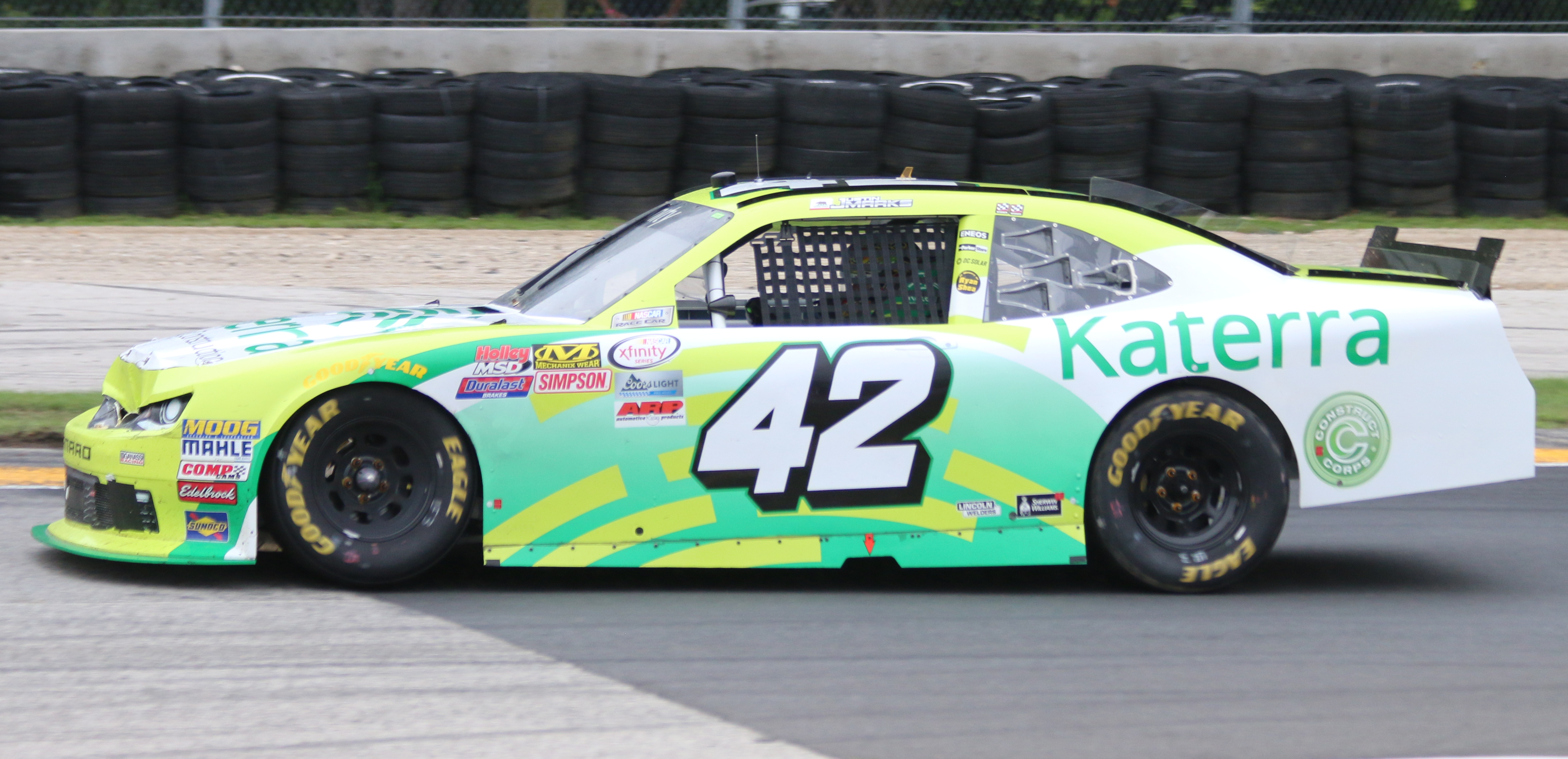
Marks' 2016 Xfinity car.

In 2016, Marks expanded his Chip Ganassi Racing schedule in the Xfinity Series, driving the No. 42 in several races starting at Las Vegas Motor Speedway. At the Mid-Ohio Sports Car Course, Marks led a race-high 43 laps in a race plagued by rain to claim his first NASCAR victory; he dedicated the win to former Ganassi driver Bryan Clauson, who had died earlier in the week in an accident.

In 2017, Marks returned to the Xfinity Series driving the No. 42 for Chip Ganassi Racing at the Mid-Ohio Sports Car Course finishing ninth and at Road America finishing fourth. On October 15, Marks joined Tommy Baldwin Racing's No. 7 for his return to the Cup Series at Talladega Superspeedway. It was his first non road course start in the Monster Energy series. However he finished last after getting into an incident.

In 2018, Marks ran the season opening Daytona 500 in the No. 51 for Rick Ware Racing with support from Premium Motorsports. He brought the car home twelfth, which was by far his best oval track finish in the Cup Series. He later partnered with Premium Motorsports to drive the No. 15 at Sonoma and the Charlotte Roval.

In 2022, Marks returned to NASCAR, competing in the No. 41 Chevrolet for Niece Motorsports at Mid Ohio.

On June 20, 2023, Kaulig Racing announced that Marks would drive the No. 10 Chevrolet in the inaugural Xfinity Series race on the Chicago Street Course.

=== Grand Am Rolex Sports Car Series return ===
Marks returned to the Grand Am Rolex Sports Car Series for the 2009 season driving the TRG No. 67 No Fear/Construct Corps Porsche with teammate Andy Lally. The team began the season with an impressive victory in the GT class at the Rolex 24 Hours of Daytona.

=== ARCA Racing Series ===
On December 17, 2009, Lakeville, Minnesota's Win-Tron Racing announced that Marks would drive their No. 32 Toyota in the 2010 ARCA Racing Series season.

== Entrepreneurial career ==
Marks' father, Michael, is a partner in the private equity firm Riverwood Capital, board member of GoPro and a minority owner in the Golden State Warriors. He also served as an executive at Crocs and the interim CEO of Tesla Motors.

Marks and Michael McDowell operate a karting facility called the Trackhouse Motorplex, located 30 miles north of Charlotte, North Carolina. The facility opened in October 2012, and was inspired by another karting track located in Parma, Italy.

In 2015, HScott Motorsports owner Harry Scott Jr. took control of TSM's K&N Pro Series East team, and partnered with Marks to field four cars under the banner HScott Motorsports with Justin Marks for Scott Heckert, William Byron, Justin Haley, Dalton Sargeant, and Rico Abreu. Marks also owned a World of Outlaws team, Larson Marks Racing, with Kyle Larson before relinquishing his stake to Larson in 2018 to focus on sports car racing.

In August 2020, Marks partnered with former NASCAR executive Ty Norris to create Trackhouse Racing, a Cup Series team that debuted in 2021. The team operates on a cause marketing strategy that includes a STEM education program for minority populations in the United States.

On June 30, 2021, Trackhouse announced their purchase of the NASCAR operations of Chip Ganassi Racing, with its two charters for the No. 1 and the No. 42 teams, therefore announcing the team will be two cars in 2022. A driver, sponsors, and number would be announced later. It was later announced that the 1 car would turn to Trackhouse with Ross Chastain driving it. Marks got his first win as a car owner on March 27, 2022, with Chastain, winning at the Circuit of the Americas in Austin, Texas.

On January 9, 2023, a consortium consisting of Trackhouse, DEJ Management, Jeff Burton Autosports, Inc., and Kevin Harvick Incorporated purchased the CARS Tour.

== Motorsports career results ==
=== NASCAR ===
(key) (Bold – Pole position awarded by qualifying time. Italics – Pole position earned by points standings or practice time. * – Most laps led.)

==== Monster Energy Cup Series ====
Monster Energy NASCAR Cup Series results
Year	Team	No.	Make	1	2	3	4	5	6	7	8	9	10	11	12	13	14	15	16	17	18	19	20	21	22	23	24	25	26	27	28	29	30	31	32	33	34	35	36	MENCC	Pts	Ref
2013	Tommy Baldwin Racing	7	Chevy	DAY	PHO	LVS	BRI	CAL	MAR	TEX	KAN	RCH	TAL	DAR	CLT	DOV	POC	MCH	SON; 30	KEN	DAY	NHA	IND	POC	GLN	MCH	BRI	ATL	RCH	CHI	NHA	DOV	KAN	CLT	TAL	MAR	TEX	PHO	HOM	46th	14	
2015	RAB Racing	29	Toyota	DAY; DNQ	ATL	LVS	PHO	CAL	MAR	TEX	BRI	RCH	TAL	KAN	CLT	DOV	POC	MCH																						65th	0^{1}	
2015	Front Row Motorsports	34	Ford																SON; 30	DAY	KEN	NHA	IND	POC	GLN	MCH	BRI	DAR	RCH	CHI	NHA	DOV	CLT	KAN	TAL	MAR	TEX	PHO	HOM	65th	0^{1}	
2017	Premium Motorsports	7	Chevy	DAY	ATL	LVS	PHO	CAL	MAR	TEX	BRI	RCH	TAL	KAN	CLT	DOV	POC	MCH	SON	DAY	KEN	NHA	IND	POC	GLN	MCH	BRI	DAR	RCH	CHI	NHA	DOV	CLT	TAL; 40	KAN	MAR	TEX	PHO	HOM	67th	0^{1}	
2018	Rick Ware Racing	51	Chevy	DAY; 12	ATL	LVS	PHO	CAL	MAR	TEX	BRI	RCH	TAL	DOV	KAN	CLT	POC	MCH																						52nd	0^{1}	
2018	Premium Motorsports	15	Chevy																SON; 28	CHI	DAY	KEN	NHA	POC	GLN	MCH	BRI	DAR	IND	LVS	RCH	ROV; 27	DOV	TAL	KAN	MAR	TEX	PHO	HOM	52nd	0^{1}	

===== Daytona 500 =====
Year	Team	Manufacturer	Start	Finish
2015	RAB Racing	Toyota	DNQ	
2018	Rick Ware Racing	Chevrolet	29	12

==== Xfinity Series ====
NASCAR Xfinity Series results
Year	Team	No.	Make	1	2	3	4	5	6	7	8	9	10	11	12	13	14	15	16	17	18	19	20	21	22	23	24	25	26	27	28	29	30	31	32	33	34	35	NXSC	Pts	Ref
2008	Braun Racing	10	Toyota	DAY	CAL	LVS	ATL	BRI	NSH	TEX	PHO	MXC	TAL	RCH	DAR	CLT	DOV	NSH	KEN	MLW	NHA	DAY	CHI	GTY	IRP	CGV; 33	GLN	MCH	BRI	CAL	RCH	DOV	KAN						129th	64	
2008	Germain Racing	03	Toyota																															CLT; DNQ	MEM	TEX	PHO	HOM	129th	64	
2009	Braun Racing	10	Toyota	DAY	CAL	LVS	BRI	TEX	NSH	PHO	TAL	RCH	DAR	CLT	DOV	NSH	KEN	MLW	NHA	DAY	CHI	GTY	IRP	IOW	GLN; 32	MCH	BRI	CGV; 30	ATL	RCH; 31	DOV	KAN	CAL	CLT	MEM; 24	TEX	PHO	HOM; 32	78th	368	
2010	Baker Curb Racing	43	Ford	DAY	CAL	LVS	BRI	NSH	PHO	TEX	TAL	RCH	DAR	DOV	CLT	NSH	KEN	ROA	NHA	DAY	CHI	GTY	IRP	IOW	GLN	MCH	BRI	CGV; 43	ATL	RCH	DOV	KAN	CAL	CLT	GTY	TEX	PHO	HOM	146th	34	
2011	Baker Curb Racing	27	Ford	DAY	PHO; 40	LVS	BRI	CAL	TEX	TAL	NSH	RCH	DAR	DOV	IOW	CLT	CHI	MCH	ROA	DAY	KEN	NHA	NSH	IRP	IOW	GLN	CGV	BRI	ATL	RCH	CHI	DOV	KAN	CLT	TEX	PHO	HOM		136th	0	
2014	Turner Scott Motorsports	31	Chevy	DAY	PHO	LVS	BRI	CAL	TEX	DAR	RCH	TAL	IOW	CLT	DOV	MCH	ROA; 24	KEN	DAY	NHA	CHI	IND	IOW	GLN	MOH; 6	BRI	ATL	RCH	CHI	KEN	DOV	KAN	CLT	TEX	PHO	HOM			45th	58	
2015	RAB Racing	29	Toyota	DAY; 34	ATL	LVS	PHO	CAL	TEX	BRI	RCH	TAL	IOW	CLT	DOV	MCH	CHI	DAY	KEN	NHA	IND	IOW	GLN																45th	76	
2015	HScott Motorsports with Chip Ganassi	42	Chevy																					MOH; 15	BRI	ROA; 7	DAR	RCH	CHI	KEN	DOV	CLT	KAN	TEX	PHO	HOM			45th	76	
2016	Chip Ganassi Racing	42	Chevy	DAY	ATL	LVS; 34	PHO; 15	CAL	TEX	BRI	RCH; 13	TAL; 11	DOV; 40	CLT	POC	MCH; 22	IOW; 18	DAY; 37	KEN; 12	NHA; 18	IND	IOW; 19	GLN	MOH; 1*	BRI	ROA; 32	DAR	RCH; 22	CHI	KEN; 15	DOV; 31	CLT	KAN	TEX	PHO; 15	HOM			23rd	347	
2017	Chip Ganassi Racing	42	Chevy	DAY	ATL	LVS	PHO	CAL	TEX	BRI	TAL	RCH	CLT	DOV	POC	MCH	IOW	DAY	KEN	NHA	IND	IOW	GLN	MOH; 9	BRI	ROA; 4	DAR	RCH	CHI	KEN	DOV	CLT	KAN	TEX	PHO	HOM			42nd	75	
2018	Chip Ganassi Racing	42	Chevy	DAY	ATL	LVS	PHO	CAL	TEX	BRI	RCH	TAL	DOV	CLT	POC	MCH	IOW	CHI	DAY	KEN	NHA	IOW	GLN	MOH; 22	BRI	ROA; 6	DAR	IND	LVS	RCH	ROV; 2	DOV	KAN	TEX	PHO	HOM			41st	99	
2023	Kaulig Racing	10	Chevy	DAY	CAL	LVS	PHO	ATL	COA	RCH	MAR	TAL	DOV	DAR	CLT	PIR	SON	NSH	CSC; 38	ATL	NHA	POC	ROA	MCH	IRC	GLN	DAY	DAR	KAN	BRI	TEX	ROV	LVS	HOM	MAR	PHO			70th	1	

==== Craftsman Truck Series ====
NASCAR Craftsman Truck Series results
Year	Team	No.	Make	1	2	3	4	5	6	7	8	9	10	11	12	13	14	15	16	17	18	19	20	21	22	23	24	25	NCTC	Pts	Ref
2007	Germain Racing	03	Toyota	DAY	CAL	ATL	MAR	KAN	CLT	MFD	DOV	TEX	MCH	MLW	MEM	KEN	IRP	NSH	BRI	GTW	NHA	LVS	TAL	MAR	ATL; 22	TEX; 23	PHO; 25	HOM; 8	50th	421	
2008	Germain Racing	9	Toyota	DAY; 8	CAL; 33	ATL; 14	MAR; 20	KAN; 11	CLT; 32	MFD; 18	DOV; 16	**TEX**; 14	MCH; 13	MLW; 25	MEM; 24	KEN; 31	IRP; 30	NSH; 20	BRI; 22	GTW; 27	NHA	LVS; 29	TAL	MAR	ATL	TEX	PHO	HOM	23rd	1781	
2011	Turn One Racing	66	Chevy	DAY; 24	PHO; 18	DAR; 24	MAR; 21	NSH; 25	**DOV**; 10	CLT; 9	KAN; 20	TEX; 17	KEN; 35	IOW; 28	NSH; 21	IRP	POC	MCH	BRI										23rd	292	
2011	ThorSport Racing	98	Chevy																	ATL; 28	CHI	NHA	KEN	LVS	TAL	MAR	TEX	HOM	23rd	292	
2015	Win-Tron Racing	35	Toyota	DAY; 32	ATL	MAR	KAN	CLT	DOV	TEX	GTW	IOW	KEN	ELD	POC	MCH	BRI	MSP	CHI	NHA	LVS	TAL	MAR	TEX	PHO	HOM			107th	0^{1}	
2016	Braun Motorsports	32	Toyota	DAY	ATL; 22	MAR	KAN	DOV	CLT	TEX	IOW	GTW	KEN	ELD	POC	BRI	MCH	MSP	CHI	NHA	LVS	TAL	MAR	TEX	PHO	HOM			102nd	0^{1}	
2018	DGR-Crosley	54	Toyota	DAY	ATL	LVS; 11	MAR	DOV	KAN	CLT	TEX	IOW	GTW	CHI	KEN	ELD	POC	MCH	BRI	MSP	LVS	TAL	MAR	TEX	PHO	HOM			99th	0^{1}	
2022	Niece Motorsports	41	Chevy	DAY	LVS	ATL	COA	MAR	BRD	DAR	KAN	TEX	CLT	GTW	SON	KNX	NSH	MOH; 31	POC	IRP	RCH	KAN	BRI	TAL	HOM	PHO			72nd	8	
2026	Spire Motorsports	77	Chevy	DAY	ATL	STP	DAR	ROC	BRI	TEX	GLN	DOV	CLT	NSH	MCH	COR; 25	LRP	NWS	IRP	RCH	NHA	BRI	KAN	CLT	PHO	TAL	MAR	HOM	79th	12	

=== ARCA Racing Series ===
(key) (Bold – Pole position awarded by qualifying time. Italics – Pole position earned by points standings or practice time. * – Most laps led.)

ARCA Racing Series results
Year	Team	No.	Make	1	2	3	4	5	6	7	8	9	10	11	12	13	14	15	16	17	18	19	20	21	22	23	ARSC	Pts	Ref
2005	Bob Aiello	62	Chevy	DAY	NSH	SLM	KEN	TOL	LAN	MIL	POC	MCH	KAN	KEN	BLN	POC	GTW	LER	NSH	MCH	ISF	TOL	DSF	CHI	SLM	TAL; 21	141st	125	
2006	Hixson Motorsports	2	Pontiac	DAY	NSH; DNQ	SLM	WIN	KEN	TOL	POC; 23	MCH; 10	KAN	KEN; 36	BLN	POC												33rd	1360	
2006	Hixson Motorsports	2	Chevy													GTW; 32	NSH; 32	MCH	ISF								33rd	1360	
2006	RAB Racing	65	Dodge																	MIL; 16	TOL	DSF	CHI; 39	SLM; 29	TAL; 23	IOW; 3	33rd	1360	
2007	RAB Racing	65	Dodge	DAY; 22	USA; 32	NSH; 13	SLM; 20	**KAN**; 6	WIN; 5	KEN; 35	TOL; 11	IOW; 18	POC; 29	MCH; 20	BLN; 11	KEN; 41	POC; 38	NSH; 12	ISF; 4	MIL; 2	GTW; 8	DSF; 7	CHI; 2	SLM; 9	TAL; 8	TOL; 7	5th	4795	
2008	Germain Racing	65	Toyota	**DAY**; 26	SLM	IOW	KAN																				79th	265	
2008	Hattori Racing Enterprises	01	Toyota					CAR; 31	KEN	TOL	POC	MCH	CAY	KEN	BLN	POC	NSH	ISF	DSF	CHI	SLM	NJE	TAL; 32	TOL			79th	265	
2009	Venturini Motorsports	15	Toyota	DAY	SLM	CAR	TAL	KEN	TOL	POC	MCH; 27	MFD	IOW	KEN	BLN	POC; 8	ISF	CHI	TOL	DSF							35th	850	
2009	Venturini Motorsports	15	Chevy																					CAR; 11			35th	850	
2009	Win-Tron Racing	32	Dodge																		NJE; 21	SLM	KAN				35th	850	
2010	Win-Tron Racing	32	Toyota	DAY; 11			TEX; 4*	TAL; 9		POC; 7	MCH; 4	IOW; 9		POC; 5				CHI; 6				KAN; 10					6th	4710	
2010	Win-Tron Racing	32	Dodge		PBE; 1*	SLM; 3			TOL; 16				MFD; 10		BLN; 21	**NJE**; 20*	ISF; 22		DSF; 12	TOL; 4	SLM; 5		CAR; 16				6th	4710	

=== Complete WeatherTech SportsCar Championship results ===
(key) (Races in bold indicate pole position) (Races in italics indicate fastest lap)

Year	Team	Make	Engine	Class	1	2	3	4	5	6	7	8	9	10	11	12	Pos.	Pts
2016	Change Racing	Lamborghini Huracán GT3	Lamborghini 5.2 V10	GTD	DAY; 18	SEB	LAG	DET	WGL	MOS	LRP	ROA	VIR	COA	PET		65th	1
2017	Turner Motorsport	BMW M6 GT3	BMW 4.4 Turbo V8	GTD	DAY; 8	SEB; 20	LBH	COA	DET	WGL; 3	MOS	LRP	ROA	VIR	LAG	PET; 15	33rd	80
2018	Michael Shank Racing with Curb-Agajanian	Acura NSX GT3	Acura 3.5 Turbo V6	GTD	DAY; 11	SEB; 7	MOH; 5	DET; 2	WGL; 14	**MOS**; 6	LRP; 9	ROA; 8	VIR; 9	LAG; 13	PET; 12		9th	249
2019	Michael Shank Racing with Curb-Agajanian	Acura NSX GT3	Acura 3.5 Turbo V6	GTD	DAY; 4	**SEB**; 7	MOH	DET	WGL; 1	MOS	LRP	ROA	VIR	LAG	PET; 12		21st	106

=== Superstar Racing Experience ===
(key) * – Most laps led. ^{1} – Heat 1 winner. ^{2} – Heat 2 winner.

Superstar Racing Experience results
Year	No.	1	2	3	4	5	6	SRXC	Pts
2022	99	FIF	SBO	STA; 9	NSV	I55	SHA	24th	0^{1}
