= Brack Maggard =

American racing driver

- Born: August 18, 1946 (age 80); Eatonton, Georgia, U.S.

ARCA Menards Series career
- 9 races run over 4 years
- Best finish: 58th (2003)
- First race: 2002 Big Daddy's Liberty 200 (South Boston)
- Last race: 2005 Food World 300 (Talladega)
Wins	Top tens	Poles
0	0	0
- Statistics up to date as of November 29, 2024.

Brack Maggard (born August 18, 1946) is an American former professional stock car racing driver who has competed in the ARCA Re/Max Series from 2002 to 2005.

Maggard is a former co-owner of RAB Racing.

== Motorsports results ==
=== ARCA Re/Max Series ===
(key) (Bold – Pole position awarded by qualifying time. Italics – Pole position earned by points standings or practice time. * – Most laps led. ** – All laps led.)

ARCA Re/Max Series results
Year	Team	No.	Make	1	2	3	4	5	6	7	8	9	10	11	12	13	14	15	16	17	18	19	20	21	22	23	ARMSC	Pts	Ref
2002	Andy Belmont Racing	91	Ford	DAY	ATL	NSH	SLM	KEN	CLT	KAN	POC	MCH	TOL	SBO; 17	KEN	BLN	POC	NSH	ISF	WIN	DSF	CHI	SLM	TAL	CLT		135th	145	
2003	Cunningham Motorsports	4	Ford	DAY; DNQ									MCH; DNQ	LER													58th	530	
2003	Andy Belmont Racing	4	Ford		ATL; 15	NSH	SLM	TOL	KEN	CLT	BLN	KAN															58th	530	
2003	Andy Belmont Racing	75	Ford												POC; 22	POC; 22	NSH	ISF	WIN	DSF	CHI	SLM					58th	530	
2003	Andy Belmont Racing	83	Pontiac																				TAL; 29	CLT	SBO		58th	530	
2004	Mark Gibson Racing	56	Ford	DAY; DNQ																							94th	260	
2004	Brack Maggard Racing	65	Dodge	DAY; 41	NSH	SLM	KEN	TOL	CLT	KAN	POC														TAL; 19		94th	260	
2004	Brack Maggard Racing	65	Ford									MCH; 27	SBO	BLN	KEN	GTW	POC	LER	NSH	ISF	TOL	DSF	CHI	SLM			94th	260	
2005	Brack Maggard Racing	64	Dodge	DAY	NSH	SLM	KEN	TOL	LAN	MIL	POC	MCH	KAN	KEN	BLN	POC	GTW	LER	NSH	MCH	ISF	TOL	DSF	CHI	SLM	TAL; 35	167th	55	
