= 2005 Advance Discount Auto Parts 200 =

Race details
- Race 1 of 23 of the 2005 ARCA Re/Max Series
- Date: February 12, 2005
- Official name: Advance Discount Auto Parts 200 at Daytona
- Location: Daytona International Speedway, Daytona Beach, Florida
- Course: Permanent racing facility
- Course length: 2.5 miles (4 km)
- Distance: 65 laps, 162.5 mi (261.518 km)
- Scheduled distance: 80 laps, 200 mi (321 km)
- Average speed: 93.780 mph (150.924 km/h)

Pole position
| Driver | Bobby Gerhart | Bobby Gerhart Racing |
- Time: 48.846

Most laps led
| Driver | Bobby Gerhart | Bobby Gerhart Racing |
- Laps: 58

Winner
| No. 5 | Bobby Gerhart | Bobby Gerhart Racing |

Television in the United States
- Network: Speed
- Announcers: Ralph Sheheen, Ken Schrader, Dan Pardus

The 2005 Advance Discount Auto Parts 200 was the first stock car race of the 2005 ARCA Re/Max Series season, and the 42nd running of the event. The race was held on Saturday, February 12, 2005, at Daytona International Speedway in Daytona Beach, Florida, a 2.5 mile (4 km) permanent tri-oval shaped asphalt superspeedway. The race was originally scheduled to be contested over 80 laps, but was shortened to 65 laps due to time constraints. Bobby Gerhart, driving for Bobby Gerhart Racing, dominated amidst the utter chaos behind him and earned his fourth ARCA Re/Max Series win. To fill out the podium, Frank Kimmel, driving for Clement Racing, and J. J. Yeley, driving for Joe Gibbs Racing, would finish 2nd and 3rd, respectively.

The race was marred by a massive crash with 2 laps to go, which involved 14 cars and injured Billy Venturini and Dan Shaver.

== Background ==
Daytona International Speedway is one of three superspeedways to hold NASCAR races, the other two being Indianapolis Motor Speedway and Talladega Superspeedway. The standard track at Daytona International Speedway is a four-turn superspeedway that is 2.5 miles (4.0 km) long. The track's turns are banked at 31 degrees, while the front stretch, the location of the finish line, is banked at 18 degrees.

=== Entry list ===
- (R) denotes rookie driver.

| # | Driver | Team | Make | Sponsor |
|---|---|---|---|---|
| 00 | Ed Kennedy | Ralph Solhem Racing | Pontiac | Shark Lounge |
| 0 | Tim Mitchell | Wayne Peterson Racing | Chevrolet | Nealco, Reid's Auto Color |
| 1 | Andy Belmont | Andy Belmont Racing | Ford | Bootie Lager, Continental Fire & Safety |
| 2 | J. J. Yeley | Joe Gibbs Racing | Chevrolet | Joe Gibbs Performance Racing Oil |
| 3 | Marc Mitchell | Kenneth Appling Racing | Pontiac | Auburn University |
| 04 | Jason Basham | Darrell Basham Racing | Chevrolet | Paul Dean Holt Racing |
| 4 | Michael Guerity | Cunningham Motorsports | Dodge | Hantz Group |
| 5 | Bobby Gerhart | Bobby Gerhart Racing | Chevrolet | Lucas Oil |
| 06 | Butch Jarvis | Wayne Peterson Racing | Chevrolet | Zandel Bowers, Wayne Peterson |
| 6 | Justin Ashburn | Day Enterprise Racing | Chevrolet | 31-W Insulation |
| 07 | Jeff Spraker | Mark Karnes | Dodge | Race Kentucky Motorsports |
| 7 | Kyle Krisiloff (R) | Bobby Gerhart Racing | Chevrolet | Delphi |
| 08 | T. J. Bell | Hardcore Motorsports | Chevrolet | Healthcliff Cat Litter |
| 8 | Bill Eversole | Norm Benning Racing | Dodge | Hardcore Motorsports |
| 09 | Billy Walker | Wayne Peterson Racing | Chevrolet | Peterson Racing |
| 9 | Joey Miller (R) | Hagans Racing | Dodge | Country Joe Homes |
| 10 | Dexter Bean | Fast Track Racing | Pontiac | Fast Track Driving School |
| 11 | Chad McCumbee (R) | Fast Track Racing | Chevrolet | Coastal Vacation Resorts, Fast Track Driving School |
| 12 | Mario Gosselin | Gosselin Racing | Chevrolet | Adesa Impact |
| 13 | Johnny Leonard (R) | Florida Motorsports Group | Pontiac | Boca Bay Builders, Affordable Roofing |
| 16 | Larry Foyt | A. J. Foyt Racing | Dodge | Full Tilt Poker |
| 17 | A. J. Henriksen | ECC Motorsports | Ford | McAdams Painting, Engineered Components |
| 19 | Keith Murt | KLM Motorsports | Chevrolet | Murtco |
| 20 | Ken Weaver (R) | Ken Weaver Racing | Chevrolet | 1-800-4-A-Phone, Phoneco |
| 21 | Todd Bowsher | Bowsher Motorsports | Ford | Jack Bowsher & Associates |
| 23 | Joe Cooksey | Hixson Motorsports | Chevrolet | 1-800-SERVPRO |
| 25 | Billy Venturini | Venturini Motorsports | Chevrolet | Central Merchant Services, ReadyHosting.com |
| 26 | Brad Smith | Smith Brothers Racing | Ford | BradSmithMotorsports.com |
| 27 | Dicky Williamson | Dicky Williamson | Ford | Aesthetic Plastic Surgery |
| 28 | J. R. Patton | Mike Buckley Racing | Chevrolet | MikeBuckleyRacing.com |
| 29 | Brian Keselowski | K Automotive Racing | Ford | Competition Graphics |
| 30 | Terry Jones | Jones Group Racing | Dodge | The Jones Group |
| 33 | Robert Richardson Jr. | Richardson Racing | Ford | Richardson Racing |
| 34 | Darrell Basham | Darrell Basham Racing | Chevrolet | Basham Racing |
| 35 | Sam Beam | C. E. Clower | Pontiac | Flagship RV, East Tennessee Trailers |
| 38 | Mike Harmon | Oostlander Racing | Chevrolet | Global Pigeon Supply |
| 44 | Tim Steele | Lee Leslie Racing | Ford | Lee Leslie Racing |
| 46 | Frank Kimmel | Clement Racing | Ford | Advance Auto Parts, Pork |
| 48 | Kertus Davis | James Hylton Motorsports | Chevrolet | James Hylton Motorsports |
| 49 | Dan Shaver | Shaver Motorsports | Chevrolet | Petro Express |
| 56 | Ryan Howard | Mark Gibson Racing | Pontiac | Mark Gibson Racing |
| 59 | Mark Gibson | Mark Gibson Racing | Pontiac | Williams Bros Lumber |
| 60 | Todd Kluever | Roush Racing | Ford | World Financial Group |
| 62 | Clair Zimmerman | Bob Aiello | Pontiac | Huntilar Corporation |
| 64 | Matt Hagans | Hagans Racing | Dodge | Dave Allison Motorsports |
| 65 | Walt Brannen | Brack Maggard Racing | Dodge | Southern Pan Services, Georgia Peanuts |
| 67 | Chad Blount | ML Motorsports | Chevrolet | ML Motorsports |
| 68 | Steve Bramley | Steve Bramley | Chevrolet | Michelob Ultra |
| 75 | G. R. Smith | Bob Schacht Motorsports | Ford | Bob Schacht Motorsports |
| 78 | Doug Reid III | 3-D Motorsports | Chevrolet | Substation Service Company |
| 79 | Tim Turner | K&K Racing | Pontiac | K&K Racing, Karl's Plumbing |
| 84 | Norm Benning | Norm Benning Racing | Chevrolet | Benning Motorsports |
| 88 | Eddie Mercer | Bobby Jones Racing | Dodge | Bobby Jones Racing |
| 90 | David Ragan (R) | Day Enterprise Racing | Dodge | David Ragan Racing |
| 91 | Christi Passmore | Christi Passmore Racing | Chevrolet | GAP Roofing, Asphalt & Fuel Supply |
| 94 | Blake Feese | Hendrick Motorsports | Chevrolet | Ditech.com |
| 95 | Roger Williams | Roger Williams | Pontiac | Millennium Resources Team Racing |
| 96 | Brandon Knupp | MK Racing | Ford | MK Racing |
| 98 | Benny Chastain | Drew White Motorsports | Pontiac | White Motorsports |
Official entry list

== Practice ==
=== First practice ===
The first practice session was held at 9:30 AM EST on Thursday, February 10, and would last for 140 minutes. Kyle Krisiloff, driving for Bobby Gerhart Racing, was fastest in the first practice session, with a time of 48.847 and a speed of 184.249 mph (296.520 km/h).

| Pos | No. | Driver | Team | Manufacturer | Time | Speed |
|---|---|---|---|---|---|---|
| 1 | 7 | Kyle Krisiloff (R) | Bobby Gerhart Racing | Chevrolet | 48.847 | 184.249 |
| 2 | 5 | Bobby Gerhart | Bobby Gerhart Racing | Chevrolet | 48.864 | 184.185 |
| 3 | 94 | Blake Feese | Hendrick Motorsports | Chevrolet | 48.893 | 184.075 |
First practice results

=== Final practice ===
The final practice session was held at 1:30 PM EST on Thursday, February 10, and would last for 210 minutes. Frank Kimmel, driving for Clement Racing, was fastest in the final practice session, with a time of 48.575 and a speed of 185.280 mph (298.179 km/h).

| Pos | No. | Driver | Team | Manufacturer | Time | Speed |
|---|---|---|---|---|---|---|
| 1 | 46 | Frank Kimmel | Clement Racing | Ford | 48.575 | 185.280 |
| 2 | 60 | Todd Kluever | Roush Racing | Ford | 48.636 | 185.048 |
| 3 | 7 | Kyle Krisiloff (R) | Bobby Gerhart Racing | Chevrolet | 48.696 | 184.820 |
Final practice results

== Qualifying ==
Qualifying was held on Friday, February 11, at 12:00 PM EST. The fastest 34 drivers in the session were able to qualify on speed, while the last 7 drivers had to rely on provisionals to make the race.

Bobby Gerhart, driving for Bobby Gerhart Racing, won the pole for the third consecutive ARCA race at Daytona, with a time of 48.846 and a speed of 184.253 mph (296.526 km/h).

The qualifying times of Frank Kimmel, Kertus Davis, Roger Williams, Darrell Basham, Tim Turner, Dicky Williamson, Steve Bramley, Christi Passmore, Brad Smith, and Brandon Knupp were disallowed after they all failed to complete technical inspection for qualifying. Some drivers were able to start the race by using provisionals.

Nineteen drivers failed to qualify: Brian Keselowski, Ryan Howard, Terry Jones, J. R. Patton, Butch Jarvis, Andy Belmont, Tim Mitchell, Paul White, Sam Beam, Jason Basham, Tim Turner, Brandon Knupp, Steve Bramley, Roger Williams, Darrell Basham, Kertus Davis, Dicky Williamson, Brad Smith, and Billy Walker.

=== Qualifying results ===
| Pos. | # | Driver | Team | Make | Time | Speed |
|---|---|---|---|---|---|---|
| 1 | 5 | Bobby Gerhart | Bobby Gerhart Racing | Chevrolet | 48.846 | 184.253 |
| 2 | 94 | Blake Feese | Hendrick Motorsports | Chevrolet | 48.990 | 183.711 |
| 3 | 60 | Todd Kluever | Roush Racing | Ford | 49.313 | 182.508 |
| 4 | 7 | Kyle Krisiloff (R) | Bobby Gerhart Racing | Chevrolet | 49.344 | 182.393 |
| 5 | 9 | Joey Miller (R) | Hagans Racing | Dodge | 49.411 | 182.146 |
| 6 | 44 | Tim Steele | Lee Leslie Racing | Ford | 49.426 | 182.090 |
| 7 | 4 | Michael Guerity | Cunningham Motorsports | Dodge | 49.434 | 182.061 |
| 8 | 19 | Keith Murt | KLM Motorsports | Chevrolet | 49.442 | 182.031 |
| 9 | 2 | J. J. Yeley | Joe Gibbs Racing | Chevrolet | 49.450 | 182.002 |
| 10 | 65 | Walt Brannen | Brack Maggard Racing | Dodge | 49.463 | 181.954 |
| 11 | 25 | Billy Venturini | Venturini Motorsports | Chevrolet | 49.469 | 181.932 |
| 12 | 16 | Larry Foyt | A. J. Foyt Racing | Dodge | 49.659 | 181.236 |
| 13 | 8 | Bill Eversole | Norm Benning Racing | Dodge | 49.661 | 181.229 |
| 14 | 75 | G. R. Smith | Bob Schacht Motorsports | Ford | 49.711 | 181.046 |
| 15 | 67 | Chad Blount | ML Motorsports | Chevrolet | 49.714 | 181.036 |
| 16 | 12 | Mario Gosselin | Gosselin Racing | Chevrolet | 49.866 | 180.484 |
| 17 | 00 | Ed Kennedy | Ralph Solhem Racing | Pontiac | 49.877 | 180.444 |
| 18 | 6 | Justin Ashburn | Day Enterprise Racing | Chevrolet | 49.890 | 180.397 |
| 19 | 17 | A. J. Henriksen | ECC Motorsports | Ford | 49.904 | 180.346 |
| 20 | 07 | Jeff Spraker | Mark Karnes | Pontiac | 49.913 | 180.314 |
| 21 | 64 | Matt Hagans | Hagans Racing | Dodge | 49.948 | 180.187 |
| 22 | 3 | Marc Mitchell | Kenneth Appling Racing | Pontiac | 49.959 | 180.148 |
| 23 | 13 | Johnny Leonard (R) | Florida Motorsports Group | Pontiac | 50.006 | 179.978 |
| 24 | 88 | Eddie Mercer | Bobby Jones Racing | Dodge | 50.023 | 179.917 |
| 25 | 49 | Dan Shaver | Shaver Motorsports | Chevrolet | 50.113 | 179.594 |
| 26 | 38 | Mike Harmon | Oostlander Racing | Chevrolet | 50.113 | 179.594 |
| 27 | 78 | Doug Reid III | 3-D Motorsports | Chevrolet | 50.131 | 179.530 |
| 28 | 08 | T. J. Bell | Hardcore Motorsports | Chevrolet | 50.156 | 179.440 |
| 29 | 62 | Clair Zimmerman | Bob Aiello | Pontiac | 50.211 | 179.244 |
| 30 | 10 | Dexter Bean | Fast Track Racing | Pontiac | 50.223 | 179.201 |
| 31 | 90 | David Ragan (R) | Day Enterprise Racing | Dodge | 50.232 | 179.169 |
| 32 | 20 | Ken Weaver (R) | Ken Weaver Racing | Chevrolet | 50.264 | 179.055 |
| 33 | 33 | Robert Richardson Jr. | Richardson Racing | Ford | 50.283 | 178.987 |
| 34 | 98 | Benny Chastain | Drew White Motorsports | Pontiac | 50.303 | 178.916 |
Provisionals
| 35 | 59 | Mark Gibson | Mark Gibson Racing | Pontiac | – | – |
| 36 | 11 | Chad McCumbee (R) | Fast Track Racing | Chevrolet | 50.740 | 177.375 |
| 37 | 91 | Christi Passmore | Christi Passmore Racing | Chevrolet | – | – |
| 38 | 21 | Todd Bowsher | Bowsher Motorsports | Ford | 51.295 | 175.456 |
| 39 | 84 | Norm Benning | Norm Benning Racing | Chevrolet | – | – |
| 40 | 23 | Joe Cooksey | Hixson Motorsports | Chevrolet | 51.439 | 174.965 |
| 41 | 46 | Frank Kimmel | Clement Racing | Ford | – | – |
Failed to qualify
| 42 | 29 | Brian Keselowski | K Automotive Racing | Ford | 50.323 | 178.845 |
| 43 | 56 | Ryan Howard | Mark Gibson Racing | Pontiac | 50.552 | 178.035 |
| 44 | 30 | Terry Jones | Jones Group Racing | Dodge | 50.580 | 177.936 |
| 45 | 28 | J. R. Patton | Mike Buckley Racing | Chevrolet | 51.128 | 176.029 |
| 46 | 06 | Butch Jarvis | Wayne Peterson Racing | Chevrolet | 51.256 | 175.589 |
| 47 | 1 | Andy Belmont | Andy Belmont Racing | Ford | 51.476 | 174.839 |
| 48 | 0 | Tim Mitchell | Wayne Peterson Racing | Chevrolet | 52.565 | 171.217 |
| 49 | 92 | Paul White | Glen Passmore Racing | Ford | 52.691 | 170.807 |
| 50 | 35 | Sam Beam | C. E. Clover | Pontiac | – | – |
| 51 | 04 | Jason Basham | Darrell Basham Racing | Chevrolet | – | – |
| 52 | 79 | Tim Turner | K&K Racing | Pontiac | – | – |
| 53 | 96 | Brandon Knupp | MK Racing | Ford | – | – |
| 54 | 68 | Steve Bramley | Steve Bramley | Chevrolet | – | – |
| 55 | 95 | Roger Williams | Roger Williams | Pontiac | – | – |
| 56 | 34 | Darrell Basham | Darrell Basham Racing | Chevrolet | – | – |
| 57 | 48 | Kertus Davis | James Hylton Motorsports | Chevrolet | – | – |
| 58 | 27 | Dicky Williamson | Dicky Williamson | Ford | – | – |
| 59 | 26 | Brad Smith | Smith Brothers Racing | Ford | – | – |
| 60 | 09 | Billy Walker | Wayne Peterson Racing | Chevrolet | – | – |
Official qualifying results
Starting lineup

== Race ==
The race began on Saturday, February 12, at 4:10 PM EST.

As the race began, Bobby Gerhart immediately pulled ahead of Blake Feese for the lead. The attrition began very early on, as Norm Benning's car began leaking oil before the race had even began. On lap 4, the first caution came out for Mark Gibson slamming Robert Richardson Jr. into the wall in turn 4. After a quick green-flag stint, Eddie Mercer crashed hard in turn 4 and was hit by Benny Chastain. Both drivers became the first retirees of the race.

On lap 25, Clair Zimmerman was racing side-by-side with Benning when his car suddenly spun backwards on the tri-oval. The rear end of Zimmerman's car lifted off the ground, and he spun back up the track and slammed the catchfence. The race was red-flagged for 39 minutes to make repairs to the catchfence. A woman was reportedly hit by debris from the crash, though she declined treatment.

During the caution for Zimmerman's wreck, Blake Feese missed his pit stall and hit one of his crew members and four photographers. Luckily, none of the people appeared to be seriously injured, but Feese was forced to retire for a radiator issue. Gerhart was also forced to give up the lead to Matt Hagans and Chad McCumbee, who both stayed out under the caution, though Gerhart quickly regained the lead on lap 35. Four laps later, Ed Kennedy was spun from behind by Mark Gibson in turn 1, which sparked a six-car pileup. None of the drivers involved were injured.

Three laps after the green flag came out, Marc Mitchell's car caught on fire and came to rest in turn 1, causing the fifth caution of the event. It was under this caution that ARCA officials decided to shorten the race to 65 laps, due to the impending Budweiser Shootout. During the final green-flag stint, Gerhart continued leading as Joey Miller, Todd Kluever, Frank Kimmel, and others battled hard for 2nd.

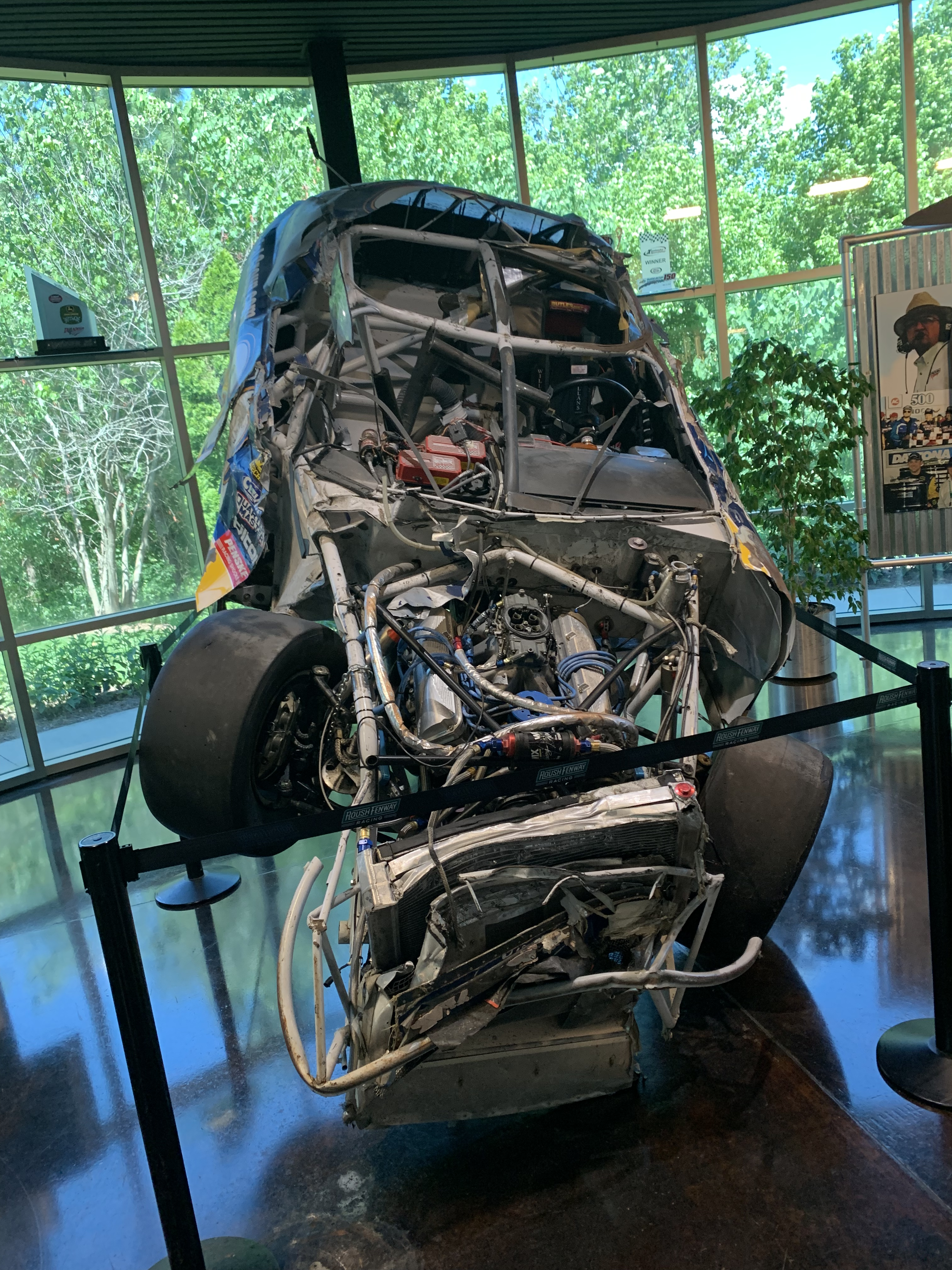
The remains of Kluever's destroyed car on display at RFK Racing's museum.

With two laps to go, Miller was running in 4th when his car broke loose exiting turn 2. Miller's car spun down the track and made slight contact with the right-rear quarter panel of Kluever's car, causing him to slide upside-down and into the path of Larry Foyt, who crashed into him. Kluever, who was still upside-down, was hit by another car and barrel-rolled in the grass as a massive pileup was unfolding on the backstretch. Billy Venturini, one of the many drivers involved in the pileup, was T-boned by Dan Shaver. Shaver was simultaneously slammed from behind, which sent Shaver's car upside-down. The caution came out for the 6th and final time, with Bobby Gerhart being declared the winner.

Following the race, Venturini and Shaver were both transported to the Halifax Medical Center. Shaver was treated and released, while Venturini was admitted for further evaluation. He was later diagnosed with injuries to his second vertebrae, the disc below the second vertebrae and ligament damage. On February 15, Venturini was transported to Carolinas Medical Center in Charlotte, North Carolina, for further observation. Venturini was fitted with a head and neck Halo, and was released from the hospital on February 19. He made his return to ARCA at Kentucky Speedway on July 8, 2005.

=== Race results ===
| Fin | St | # | Driver | Team | Make | Laps | Led | Status | Pts |
|---|---|---|---|---|---|---|---|---|---|
| 1 | 1 | 5 | Bobby Gerhart | Bobby Gerhart Racing | Chevrolet | 65 | 58 | Running | 250 |
| 2 | 41 | 46 | Frank Kimmel | Clement Racing | Ford | 65 | 0 | Running | 220 |
| 3 | 9 | 2 | J. J. Yeley | Joe Gibbs Racing | Chevrolet | 65 | 0 | Running | 215 |
| 4 | 7 | 4 | Michael Guerity | Cunningham Motorsports | Dodge | 65 | 0 | Running | 210 |
| 5 | 21 | 64 | Matt Hagans | Hagans Racing | Dodge | 65 | 4 | Running | 210 |
| 6 | 28 | 08 | T. J. Bell | Hardcore Motorsports | Chevrolet | 65 | 0 | Running | 200 |
| 7 | 5 | 9 | Joey Miller (R) | Hagans Racing | Dodge | 65 | 0 | Running | 195 |
| 8 | 26 | 38 | Mike Harmon | Oostlander Racing | Chevrolet | 65 | 0 | Running | 190 |
| 9 | 20 | 07 | Jeff Spraker | Mark Karnes | Dodge | 65 | 0 | Running | 185 |
| 10 | 39 | 84 | Norm Benning | Norm Benning Racing | Chevrolet | 64 | 0 | Running | 180 |
| 11 | 3 | 60 | Todd Kluever | Roush Racing | Ford | 63 | 0 | Accident | 180 |
| 12 | 12 | 16 | Larry Foyt | A. J. Foyt Racing | Dodge | 63 | 0 | Accident | 170 |
| 13 | 4 | 7 | Kyle Krisiloff (R) | Bobby Gerhart Racing | Chevrolet | 63 | 0 | Accident | 165 |
| 14 | 11 | 25 | Billy Venturini | Venturini Motorsports | Chevrolet | 63 | 0 | Accident | 160 |
| 15 | 32 | 20 | Ken Weaver (R) | Ken Weaver Racing | Chevrolet | 63 | 0 | Accident | 155 |
| 16 | 14 | 75 | G. R. Smith | Bob Schacht Motorsports | Ford | 63 | 0 | Accident | 150 |
| 17 | 19 | 17 | A. J. Hendriksen | ECC Motorsports | Ford | 63 | 0 | Accident | 145 |
| 18 | 27 | 78 | Doug Reid III | 3-D Motorsports | Chevrolet | 63 | 0 | Accident | 140 |
| 19 | 25 | 49 | Dan Shaver | Shaver Motorsports | Chevrolet | 63 | 0 | Accident | 135 |
| 20 | 16 | 12 | Mario Gosselin | Gosselin Racing | Chevrolet | 63 | 0 | Accident | 135 |
| 21 | 38 | 21 | Todd Bowsher | Bowsher Motorsports | Ford | 63 | 0 | Accident | 125 |
| 22 | 36 | 11 | Chad McCumbee (R) | Fast Track Racing | Chevrolet | 63 | 3 | Accident | 125 |
| 23 | 40 | 23 | Joe Cooksey | Hixson Motorsports | Chevrolet | 63 | 0 | Accident | 115 |
| 24 | 37 | 91 | Christi Passmore | Christ Passmore Racing | Chevrolet | 63 | 0 | Accident | 110 |
| 25 | 30 | 10 | Dexter Bean | Fast Track Racing | Pontiac | 63 | 0 | Running | 105 |
| 26 | 33 | 33 | Robert Richardson Jr. | Richardson Racing | Ford | 63 | 0 | Running | 100 |
| 27 | 22 | 3 | Marc Mitchell | Kenneth Appling Racing | Pontiac | 51 | 0 | Fire | 95 |
| 28 | 18 | 6 | Justin Ashburn | Day Enterprise Racing | Chevrolet | 49 | 0 | Handling | 90 |
| 29 | 6 | 44 | Tim Steele | Lee Leslie Racing | Ford | 49 | 0 | Radiator | 85 |
| 30 | 35 | 59 | Mark Gibson | Mark Gibson Racing | Pontiac | 40 | 0 | Accident | 80 |
| 31 | 17 | 00 | Ed Kennedy | Ralph Solhem Racing | Pontiac | 39 | 0 | Accident | 75 |
| 32 | 31 | 90 | David Ragan (R) | Day Enterprise Racing | Dodge | 39 | 0 | Accident | 70 |
| 33 | 15 | 67 | Chad Blount | ML Motorsports | Chevrolet | 39 | 0 | Accident | 65 |
| 34 | 23 | 13 | Johnny Leonard (R) | Florida Motorsports Group | Pontiac | 39 | 0 | Accident | 60 |
| 35 | 13 | 8 | Bill Eversole | Norm Benning Racing | Dodge | 39 | 0 | Accident | 55 |
| 36 | 2 | 94 | Blake Feese | Hendrick Motorsports | Chevrolet | 27 | 0 | Accident | 60 |
| 37 | 10 | 65 | Walt Brannen | Brack Maggard Racing | Dodge | 26 | 0 | Radiator | 45 |
| 38 | 29 | 62 | Clair Zimmerman | Bob Aiello | Pontiac | 24 | 0 | Accident | 40 |
| 39 | 8 | 19 | Keith Murt | KLM Motorsports | Chevrolet | 12 | 0 | Engine | 35 |
| 40 | 24 | 88 | Eddie Mercer | Bobby Jones Racing | Dodge | 11 | 0 | Accident | 30 |
| 41 | 34 | 98 | Benny Chastain | Drew White Motorsports | Pontiac | 11 | 0 | Accident | 30 |
Official race results

== Standings after the race ==
Drivers' Championship standings

| Pos | Driver | Points |
|---|---|---|
| 1 | Bobby Gerhart | 250 |
| 2 | Frank Kimmel | 220 (–30) |
| 3 | J. J. Yeley | 215 (–35) |
| 4 | Michael Guerity | 210 (–40) |
| 5 | Matt Hagans | 210 (–40) |
| 6 | T. J. Bell | 200 (–50) |
| 7 | Joey Miller | 195 (–55) |
| 8 | Mike Harmon | 190 (–60) |
| 9 | Jeff Spraker | 185 (–65) |
| 10 | Norm Benning | 180 (–70) |

- Note: Only the first 10 positions are included for the driver standings.

| Previous race: 2004 Food World 300 | ARCA Re/Max Series; 2005 season | Next race: 2005 PFG Lester 150 |
