= Tim Russell (racing driver) =

American racing driver

- Born: February 16, 1983 (age 43); Longwood, Florida, U.S.

ARCA Menards Series career
- 5 races run over 2 years
- Best finish: 70th (2006)
- First race: 2006 Daytona ARCA 200 (Daytona)
- Last race: 2007 Construct Corps / Palm Beach Grading 250 (Lakeland)
Wins	Top tens	Poles
0	2	0
- Statistics up to date as of January 27, 2025.

Tim Russell (born February 16, 1983) is an American former professional stock car racing driver who has previously competed in the ARCA Racing Series from 2006 to 2007.

Russell has also competed in series such as the ASA National Tour, the ASA CRA Super Series, the Florida United Promoters Late Model Series, and the FASCAR Goodyear Challenge Series.

== Motorsports results ==
=== ARCA Re/Max Series ===
(key) (Bold – Pole position awarded by qualifying time. Italics – Pole position earned by points standings or practice time. * – Most laps led.)

ARCA Re/Max Series results
Year	Team	No.	Make	1	2	3	4	5	6	7	8	9	10	11	12	13	14	15	16	17	18	19	20	21	22	23	ARSC	Pts	Ref
2006	Hagans Racing	10	Dodge	DAY; 23	NSH	SLM	WIN	KEN	TOL	POC	MCH																70th	460	
2006	Hagans Racing	9	Dodge									KAN; 15	KEN	BLN	POC	GTW	NSH	MCH	ISF	MIL	TOL	DSF	CHI; 8	SLM	TAL	IOW	70th	460	
2007	Hagans Racing	9	Dodge	DAY; 25	USA; 6	NSH	SLM	KAN	WIN	KEN	TOL	IOW	POC	MCH	BLN	KEN	POC	NSH	ISF	MIL	GTW	DSF	CHI	SLM	TAL	TOL	83rd	305	
