= Tandy Marlin =

American racing driver

- Born: Tandy Scott Marlin; November 14, 1970; Franklin, Tennessee, U.S.
- Died: December 28, 2023 (aged 53)

ARCA Menards Series career
- 10 races run over 3 years
- Best finish: 43rd (1999)
- First race: 2003 Atlanta ARCA 400 (Atlanta)
- Last race: 2005 WLWT Channel 5 150 (Kentucky)
Wins	Top tens	Poles
0	4	0
- Statistics up to date as of November 30, 2024.

Tandy Scott Marlin (born November 14, 1970 – December 28, 2023) was an American professional stock car racing driver who competed in the ARCA Re/Max Series from 2003 to 2005.

Marlin competed in series such as the CRA JEGS All-Stars Tour, the Quicksilver Street Stock Performance Series, the Ultimate Street Stock East Region Series, the East Bay Winternationals, and the Crate Racin' USA Weekly Racing Series.

== Motorsports results ==
=== ARCA Re/Max Series ===
(key) (Bold – Pole position awarded by qualifying time. Italics – Pole position earned by points standings or practice time. * – Most laps led. ** – All laps led.)

ARCA Re/Max Series results
Year	Team	No.	Make	1	2	3	4	5	6	7	8	9	10	11	12	13	14	15	16	17	18	19	20	21	22	23	ARMSC	Pts	Ref
2003	Tandy Marlin	77	Dodge	DAY	ATL; 6	NSH; 14	SLM	TOL	KEN	CLT	BLN	KAN	MCH	LER	POC	POC	NSH; 6	ISF	WIN	DSF	CHI	SLM	TAL	CLT; 27	SBO		43rd	660	
2004	Braun Racing	77	Dodge	DAY	NSH; 7	SLM	KEN	TOL	CLT	KAN	POC	MCH	SBO	BLN													44th	670	
2004	Jon Presnell	77	Dodge												KEN; 3	GTW	POC	LER	NSH; 11	ISF	TOL	DSF	CHI; 29	SLM	TAL		44th	670	
2005	Jon Presnell	77	Dodge	DAY	NSH; 23	SLM	KEN	TOL	LAN	MIL	POC	MCH	KAN	KEN; 24	BLN	POC	GTW	LER	NSH; DNQ	MCH	ISF	TOL	DSF	CHI	SLM	TAL	98th	255	
