= 2006 ARCA Re/Max Series =

American stock car series

2006 ARCA RE/MAX Series

Seasons
- ← 2005 2007 →

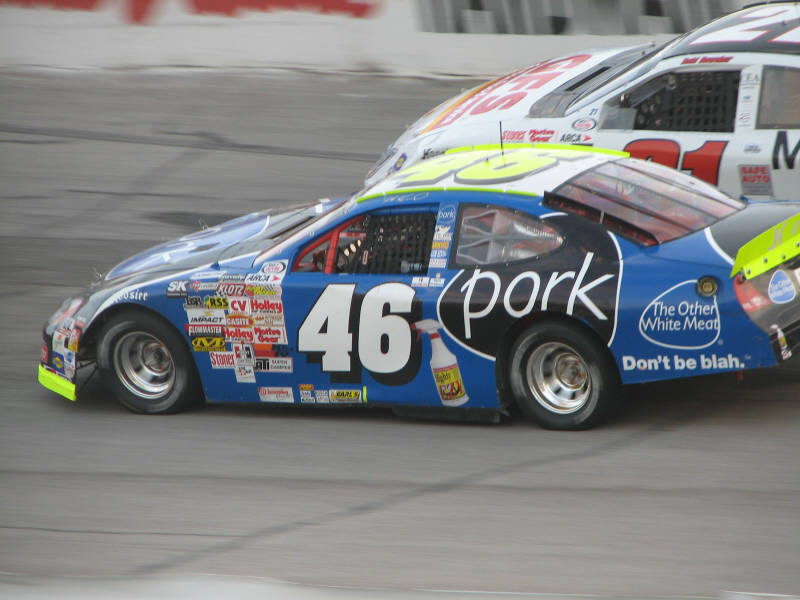
Frank Kimmel, driving the No. 46 car for Clement Racing, the 2006 ARCA champion. This was his seventh consecutive title and eighth overall in the series.

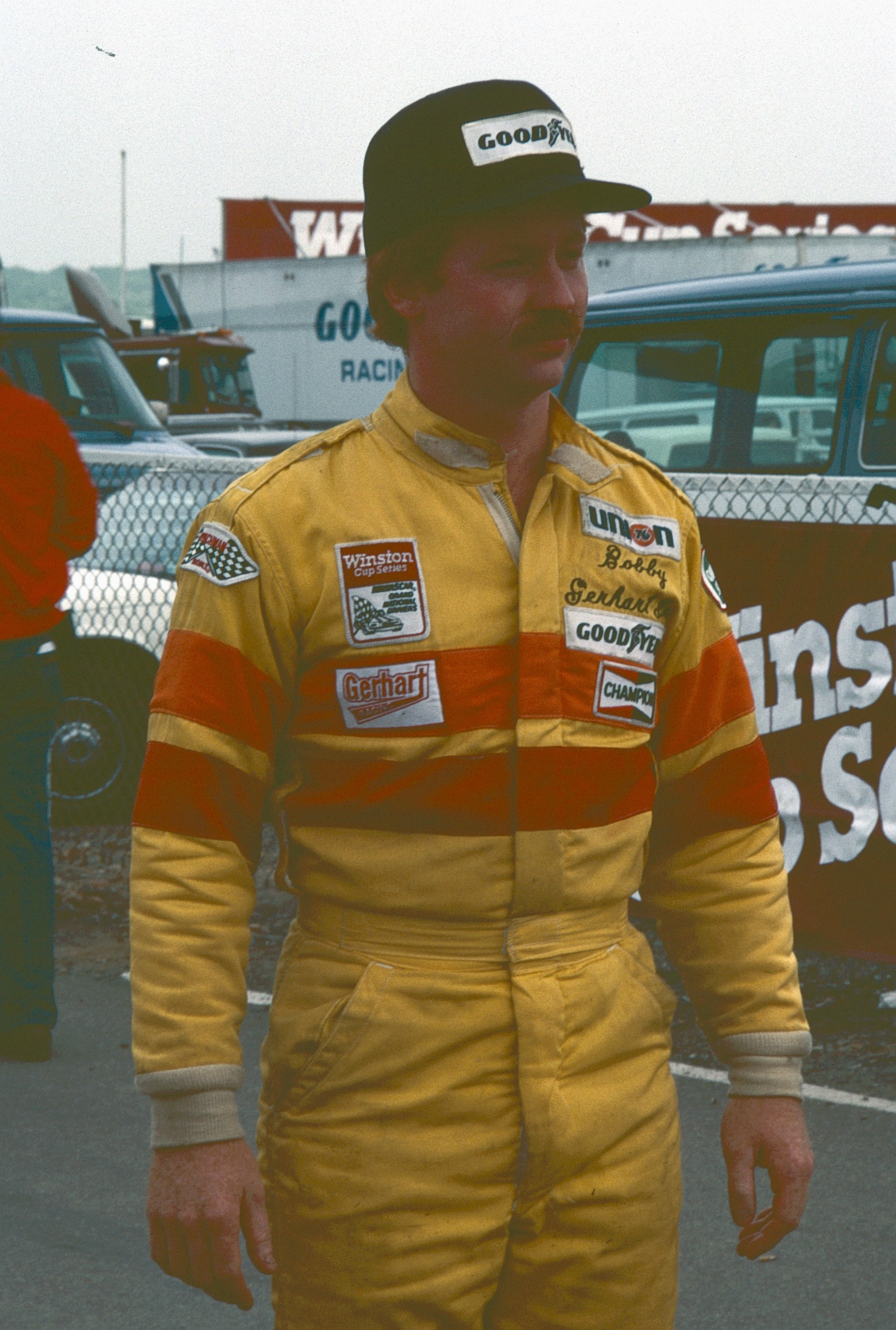
Bobby Gerhart finished second in the championship standings.

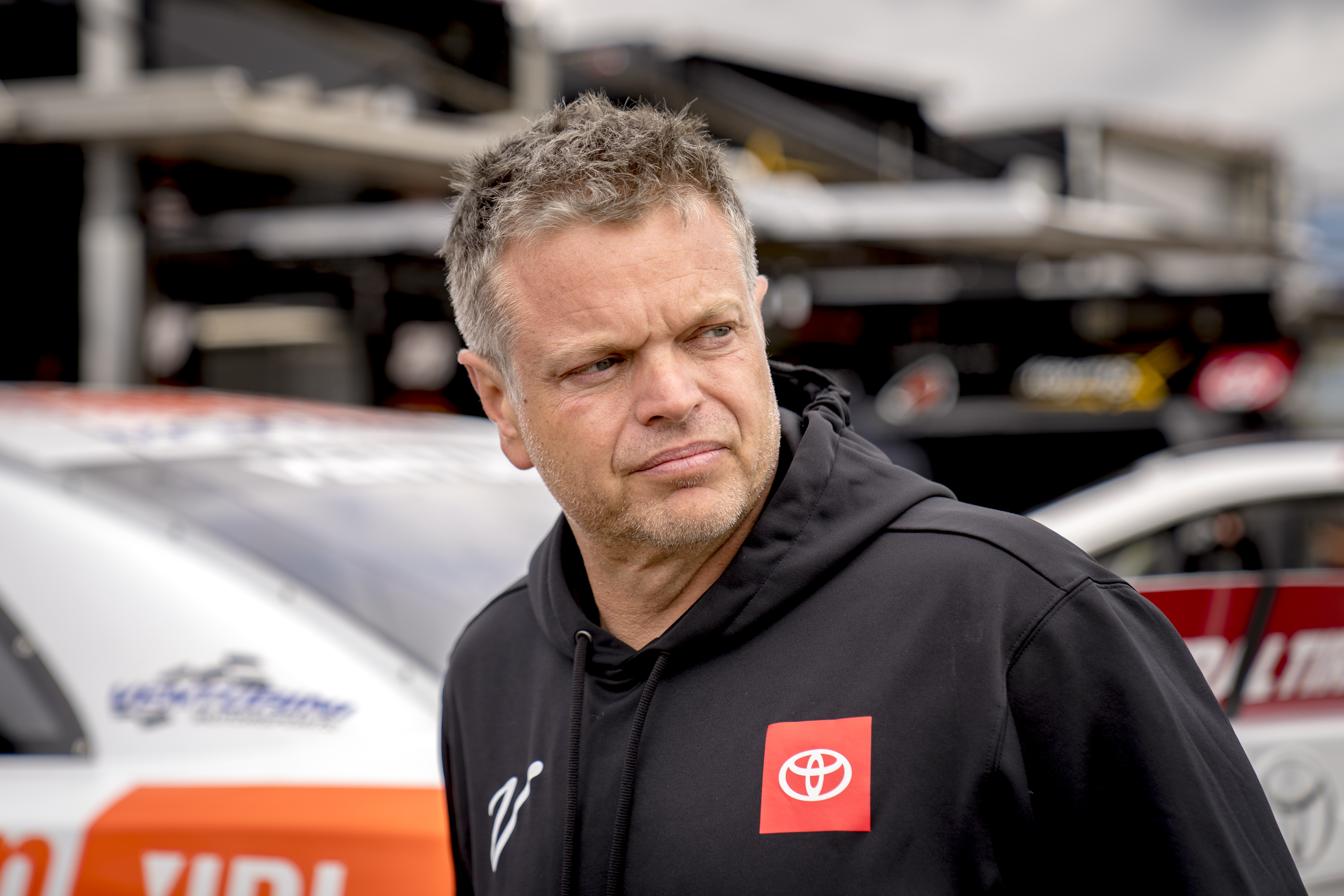
Billy Venturini finished third in the championship standings.

The 2006 ARCA Re/Max Series was the 54th season of the ARCA Racing Series, a division of the Automobile Racing Club of America (ARCA). The season was scheduled to begin on February 11, 2006 with the Daytona ARCA 200 at Daytona International Speedway, but the race was delayed until February 12 because of rain. The season ended with the Prairie Meadows 250 at Iowa Speedway eight months later. Frank Kimmel won the driver's championship, his eighth in the series, while Blake Bjorklund won the Rookie of the Year award.

== Schedule and results ==
Date	Track	City	Event name	Pole winner	Race winner
February 11 (Rain-delayed until February 12)	Daytona International Speedway	Daytona Beach, Florida	Daytona ARCA 200	Bobby Gerhart	Bobby Gerhart
April 15	Nashville Superspeedway	Lebanon, Tennessee	PFG Lester 150	Steve Wallace	Stephen Leicht
April 23	Salem Speedway	Washington Township, Indiana	Kentuckiana Ford Dealers 200	Brad Coleman	Billy Venturini
May 7	Winchester Speedway	White River Township, Indiana	Winchester ARCA 200	Brett Rowe	Frank Kimmel
May 13	Kentucky Speedway	Sparta, Kentucky	Harley-Davidson of Cincinnati 150	Steve Wallace	Steve Wallace
May 21	Toledo Speedway	Toledo, Ohio	Hantz Group 200	Frank Kimmel	Ken Schrader
June 10	Pocono Raceway	Long Pond, Pennsylvania	Pocono 200	David Stremme	Chase Miller
June 16	Michigan International Speedway	Brooklyn, Michigan	Hantz Group 200	Chuck Weber	David Stremme
July 1	Kansas Speedway	Kansas City, Kansas	Kansas Lottery 200 Grand	Brad Coleman	Frank Kimmel
July 7	Kentucky Speedway	Sparta, Kentucky	Channel 5 150	Erin Crocker	Brad Coleman
July 15	Berlin Raceway	Marne, Michigan	Sara Lee/GFS Marketplace 200	Blake Bjorklund	Brian Keselowski
July 22	Pocono Raceway	Long Pond, Pennsylvania	Pennsylvania 200	Frank Kimmel	Frank Kimmel
July 28	Gateway International Raceway	Madison, Illinois	Shop 'n Save 150	Chase Miller	Cale Gale
August 12	Nashville Superspeedway	Lebanon, Tennessee	ARCA RE/MAX 200	Brad Coleman	Mario Gosselin
August 18	Michigan International Speedway	Brooklyn, Michigan	Hantz Group 200	Brent Sherman	Brent Sherman
August 20	Illinois State Fairgrounds Racetrack	Springfield, Illinois	Allen Crowe Memorial 100	Damon Lusk	Justin Allgaier
August 26	Milwaukee Mile	West Allis, Wisconsin	Governor's Cup 200	Blake Bjorklund	Phil Bozell
September 1	Toledo Speedway	Toledo, Ohio	Hantz Group 200	Brian Keselowski	Chuck Barnes Jr.
September 4	DuQuoin State Fairgrounds Racetrack	Du Quoin, Illinois	Southern Illinois 100	Ken Schrader	Ken Schrader
September 9	Chicagoland Speedway	Joliet, Illinois	SK Hand Tool 200	Steve Wallace	Steve Wallace
September 16	Salem Speedway	Washington Township, Indiana	Eddie Gilstrap Motors ARCA Fall Classic	Dexter Bean	Blake Bjorklund
October 6	Talladega Superspeedway	Lincoln, Alabama	Food World 250	Bobby Gerhart	Frank Kimmel
October 15	Iowa Speedway	Newton, Iowa	Prairie Meadows 250	Steve Wallace	Steve Wallace

=== Drivers' championship ===
(key) Bold – Pole position awarded by time. Italics – Pole position set by final practice results or rainout. * – Most laps led.

Pos.	Driver	Races																							Points
Pos.	Driver	DAY	NSH	SLM	WIN	KEN	TOL	POC	MCH	KAN	KEN	BER	POC	GTW	NSH	MCH	ISF	MIL	TOL	DQN	CHI	SLM	TAL	IOW	Points
1	Frank Kimmel	10	3	25	1*	28	**3***	16	19	1	2	2	1	10	15	27	2	3	2	31	5	2*	1	32	5480
2	Bobby Gerhart	**1***	16	3	5	20	10	5	15	6	8	15	6	15	7	18	27	10	26	8	17	8	7	14	5265
3	Billy Venturini	7	12	1*	28	9	11	34	12	35	25	30	7	17	4	7	9	9	9	9	6	5	30	9	4950
4	Ryan Howard	16	38	11	25	16	13	8	25	12	9	23	12	25	12	8	16	11	7	10	15	10	41	13	4670
5	Blake Bjorklund	DNQ	DNQ	8	30	7	15	33	3	37	10	**3***	32	6	11	13	12	**18**	3	5	2	1	28	28	4655
6	Todd Bowsher	20	41	19	11	29	26	11	18	11	13	11	16	14	19	24	14	17	10	12	22	9	16	16	4555
7	Ryan Foster	DNQ	13	9	6	5	5	38	14	25	7	8	11	11	28	3	33	37	34	16	11	35	25	5	4450
8	Jason Hedlesky	11	33	22	17	24	31	19	28	14	28	24	13	16	8	21	20	25	15	15	20	13	12	23	4290
9	Brett Rowe	14	28	23	**8**	22	25	10	38	4	18	7	10	21	40	15	29	15	32	2	25	26	33	17	4260
10	Justin Allgaier	DNQ	DNQ	18	7	4	2	15	40	38	39	9	19	36	16	40	1	4*	4	32	29	3	26	25	4160
11	Norm Benning	21	30	15	14	26	23	35	30	16	19	20	29	19	17	25	7	22	17	14	19	14	27	19	4150
12	Dexter Bean	DNQ	15	33	23	12	24	36	35	28	38	12	4	13	35	9	13	35	24	29	4	**11**	10	7	4115
13	Darrell Basham	18	34	12	29	30	32	17	29	29	21	18	18	20	18	28	17	21	20	20	24	22	21	18	3960
14	Brad Smith	DNQ	31	20	22	31	34	18	32	18	22	29	23	30	24	26	15	24	22	17	26	18	15	20	3750
15	Mike Harmon	31	26	16	12	33	33	31	41	40	35	26	40	29	30	31	10	31	35	13	18	31	13	39	3335
16	Ricky Sanders	DNQ	DNQ	17	DNQ	37	DNQ	37	39	36	16	14	17	26	37	30	23	30	18	24	21	17	22	29	3270
17	Damon Lusk	5	8	7	18	17	21	7	20	24	5	32	9	41	5	14	**8**								3265
18	James Hylton	DNQ	DNQ	DNQ	DNQ	DNQ	DNQ	21	DNQ	23	23	31	24	23	22	32	24	26	25	25	27	27	32	37	2995
19	Brent Sherman						6	3	16	8		27	14	12	2	**1**		13	13		DNQ	19	31	11	2875
20	Tim Mitchell	DNQ	DNQ	DNQ	32	40	DNQ	24	31	DNQ	33	19	28	22	DNQ	DNQ	32	29	23	30	DNQ	34	DNQ	DNQ	2605
21	Ken Weaver	6	17	26	9	35	8	6	6	31	12	5	34	40											2335
22	Chuck Weber	17	21	34	24	6	22	9	**24**	10	4	25	15	35											2280
23	Benny Chastain	DNQ	DNQ	DNQ	DNQ	DNQ	DNQ	39	DNQ	21	DNQ	21	33	37	39	DNQ	28	DNQ	DNQ	27	DNQ	DNQ	DNQ	DNQ	2240
24	Mario Gosselin	8	18	29	DNQ	39	9	2*	8	22	DNQ	DNQ			1						28		38	30	2215
25	Mike Koch	DNQ	DNQ	DNQ	34	DNQ	DNQ		DNQ	20	37	DNQ	30	38	DNQ	41	DNQ	DNQ	DNQ	22	37	DNQ	DNQ	DNQ	2175
26	Brad Coleman		2	**32**		2			5	**3**	1*			3	**3***	5									1900
27	Steve Wallace		10			1*				5				2*		33*					1*		2	**1***	1645
28	Ryan Mathews						18		13	13	41	6		7	25	2		5			DNQ	12			1630
29	Brian Keselowski			31			4		11			1		27		4		7	**5***					10	1620
30	T. J. Bell	9	4	21	2	13	12	25	DNQ							17									1615
31	Jeremy Clements	13	29			14		27			3		2	5	9	38					16		DNQ		1555
32	Scott Lagasse Jr.	29				34	19		9	26*	11				6	12					3				1370
33	Justin Marks		DNQ					23	10		36			32	32			17			39	29	23	3	1360
34	Michael Simko		DNQ	28	4		7		23		32	10				34			6			32			1215
35	Justin South			13			14	28			14				26						9		14	12	1200
36	Erin Crocker	15	14						4	2	**27**			8	36										1110
37	Johnny Leonard	30	39	27	20	32	27	32	22							DNQ			21						1095
38	Chase Miller		11					1					5*	**33**				12					9		1095
39	Mark Gibson						DC				DNQ	DNQ	38	39	38		3	39		11	DNQ	33	DNQ	35	1090
40	Michael McDowell																	34			38	6	5	4	965
41	Phil Bozell			4			17							9				1						15	935
42	Andy Belmont	36	32	30	27		30			32	34				DNQ	DNQ	22	19		28	DNQ				925
43	Todd Hansen		7			38			DNQ	DNQ					10	11		8			33				895
44	David Ray Boggs												22				26	33	33	26	DNQ	21	DNQ		880
45	Brandon Knupp	41	24	24	19	21									29										845
46	Frank Kapfhammer		27			27				16	15			31	14						30				810
47	Dugan Basham				DNQ		DNQ	DNQ		DNQ	DNQ	DNQ	31	DNQ		DNQ	34	DNQ	DNQ	34	DNQ	DNQ		DNQ	795
48	Dawayne Bryan	33	DNQ			11			36		6					23					13				795
49	Terry Jones	DNQ	DNQ	10		36	16		DNQ										31			15		31	760
50	Billy Leslie	DNQ		6	3		35					33							28			24			760
51	Peter Shepherd III													4	DNQ	10		36			10		24		755
52	A. J. Henriksen	DNQ						4	37				8			39					34		19		740
53	Matt Hagans	3			26						26						21						11		735
54	Gary Sherman						20					4							12			7			705
55	Ken Schrader			2			1													**1***					705
56	Josh Allison			5	33	18	26								15										650
57	Cale Gale		6											1		6									630
58	Josh Krug		22			10			7	39	30														610
59	Tim Schendel								21		31							2			12				600
60	Bob Strait																4*			4	14				590
61	Jeff Caudell				16							16						27				16			570
62	Kevin Swindell			14	21														11			25			565
63	Bryan Silas											34						20	16		35		36	26	545
64	Phillip McGilton		DNQ			DNQ			34	9	40				34	DNQ					32		DNQ	40	535
65	Doug Keller																6			7				22	530
66	Chad McCumbee	28	40										3						14						515
67	Mike Buckley						DNQ		26							22		14	29						490
68	Tom Berte		DNQ			DNQ		14		19								23						DNQ	485
69	Chuck Barnes Jr.																		1			4		DNQ	470
70	Tim Russell	23								15											8				460
71	David Odell	DNQ	DNQ			8					20				31										445
72	Matt McCall	2				3																			445
73	Brian Kaltreider							20					21			DNQ					41		20		440
74	Justin Diercks	26	35			15																	35	34	435
75	Ian Henderson										DNQ		20		20	DNQ					23				425
76	Joe Cooksey																5			3					420
77	Ryan Hackett							12					35			15					DNQ				400
78	Howard Bixman					23			27		DNQ					20					40				395
79	Burney Lamar	4												28		29									395
80	Michael Faulk		9																				8		380
81	Brett Hudson		20																			23		21	370
82	Randy Van Zant				10		DNQ					13													370
83	A. J. Fike																18			6					355
84	Juan Pablo Montoya																						3	24	350
85	Stephen Leicht	25	1*																						345
86	Pierre Bourque				13		DNQ								21								DNQ		340
87	Kelly Kovski																11			19					310
88	Greg Seevers			DNQ	DNQ		DNQ		DNQ	DNQ		DNQ		DNQ			35		DNQ	36		DNQ			305
89	Tony Leis																	6				28			290
90	Richard Johns									7	29														285
91	David Stremme							**40**	1*																285
92	Andrew Myers	39	19			25																			280
93	Jeff Flesher																19			18					275
94	Josh Wise				31														8						265
95	Willie Allen	38	5																						245
96	Burt Ingle					DNQ		26					27		DNQ										245
97	Patrick Sheltra							22	33		DNQ					DNQ									235
98	Chris Cockrum		DNQ			19					DNQ				DNQ						DNQ				235
99	Billy Shotko											28							19						225
100	Kraig Kinser																							2	225
101	Billy Wease								2																225
102	Jim Hollenbeck		DNQ				DNQ		DNQ			35				36		38							220
103	Wes O'Dell																25			23					220
104	Justin Drawdy		25								24														215
105	Kelly Bires																						4		215
106	Mike Wallace																						6*		210
107	Wayne Peterson		DNQ	DNQ	DNQ					DNQ		DNQ				DNQ			DNQ	35	DNQ				205
108	Bobby Santos III																							6	200
109	Jorge Goeters																				7				200
110	Angela Cope											22						32							190
111	Chase Pistone																							8	190
112	Doug Reid III	19																					37		180
113	Dan Shaver	12																							170
114	Carl McCormick							13																	165
115	Paul Beregszaszy					DNQ					DNQ				23										165
116	Bill Eversole								DNQ							19									160
117	Ashley Parlett						28													33					155
118	Kyle Beattie				15																				155
119	Alex García																					20		DNQ	155
120	Greg Barnhart	35	DNQ						DNQ							DNQ								DNQ	155
121	Troy Wangerin																				36			27	145
122	Mike Zazula							29	DNQ				39												145
123	Brad Keselowski								17																145
124	Timothy Peters																						17		145
125	Hermie Sadler										17														145
126	Tim Steele											17													145
127	Amber Cope													DNQ					27		DNQ				145
128	Chris Bristol													18											140
129	Skip Cummins																						18		140
130	Amanda Gogel	DNQ													33									38	130
131	John Jackson			DNQ				30		DNQ															130
132	William Gillis																			21					125
133	Ted Olswfski							DNQ					26												125
134	Brian Tyler	22																							120
135	Ron Cox		DNQ												27										120
136	Chevy White		23																						115
137	Justin Ashburn												41		41									DNQ	110
138	Eric McClure	24																							110
139	Corrie Stott													24											110
140	Tony Ave																				DNQ		29		110
141	Jerick Johnson		DNQ							34														DNQ	110
142	Ed Pompa												25												105
143	Drew White																30	DNQ							105
144	Brandon Whitt	DNQ																			31				100
145	Art Seeger							DNQ					36		DNQ										100
146	Christi Passmore	27																							95
147	Scott Traylor									27															95
148	Andy Hillenburg																	28							90
149	Will Vaught									30				34											85
150	Craig Butts	DNQ	DNQ																				39		85
151	Robb Brent																		30						80
152	Josh Clemons																					30			80
153	Chad Blount	DNQ			35																				80
154	Donny Lia		37			41																			75
155	Jamie Carr																31								75
156	Steve Blackburn		36												DNQ										75
157	G. R. Smith	32																							70
158	Jay Middleton															37					DNQ				70
159	Dale Schweikart							DNQ					37												70
160	Jeremy Petty									33															65
161	Travis Sharpe																							33	65
162	Walt Brannen	34																							60
163	Marc Mitchell																						34		60
164	Dave McClure			35																					55
165	Jason Vieau															35									55
166	John Clagett																36								50
167	Bryan Reffner																							36	50
168	Danny O'Quinn Jr.	37																							45
169	Joey Miller																							41	40
170	Jason Basham			DNQ																			40		30
171	Loyd Teakell	40																							30
	Keith Murt	DNQ																							25
	Clay Greenfield	DNQ																							25
	Jayme Beck	DNQ																							25
	Tony Ackerland	DNQ																							25
	Ed Kennedy	DNQ																							25
	Tom Gray	DNQ	DNQ																						25
	Butch Jarvis	DNQ						DNQ							DNQ										25
	Dicky Williamson	DNQ						DNQ															DNQ		25
	Steve Bramley	DNQ																			DNQ				25
	Morty Buckles		DNQ																						25
	Tyler Walker		DNQ																						25
	Chad Martin		DNQ																						25
	Tommy Strader		DNQ																						25
	Larry Hollenbeck		DNQ						DNQ							DNQ					DNQ				25
	Tim Turner							DNQ																	25
	Jeff Sennett								DNQ																25
	J. J. Sonneveldt													DNQ										DNQ	25
	Rick Tackman																	DNQ							25
	Bill Catania																		DNQ						25
	Hans-Peter Schaeppi																		DNQ			DNQ			25
	Ryan Vos																							DNQ	25
	Roger Carter																							DNQ	25
	Bob Blunt			DC																					
	Josh Richeson			DC			DC																		

== See also ==
- 2006 NASCAR Nextel Cup Series
- 2006 NASCAR Busch Series
- 2006 NASCAR Craftsman Truck Series
- 2006 NASCAR Whelen Modified Tour
- 2006 NASCAR Whelen Southern Modified Tour
