= 2004 ARCA Re/Max Series =

American stock car series

2004 ARCA RE/MAX Series

Seasons
- ← 2003 2005 →

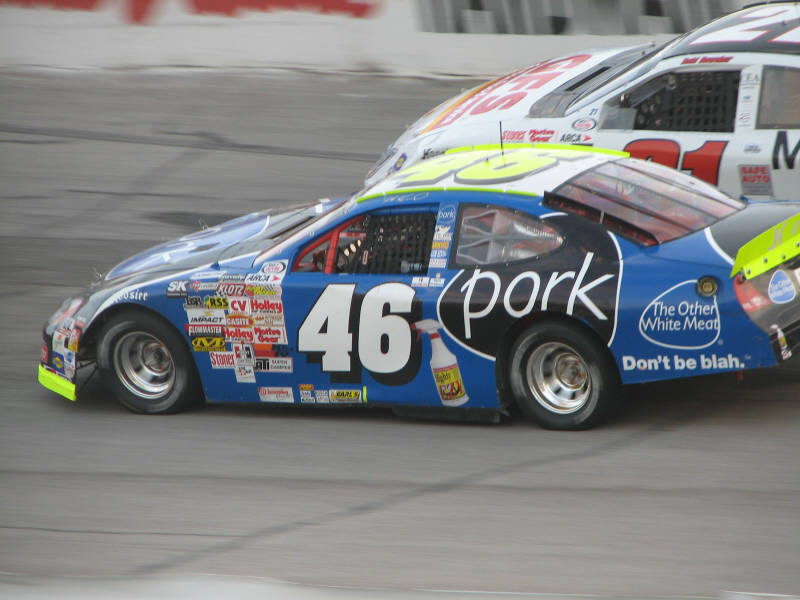
Frank Kimmel, driving the No. 46 car for Clement Racing (pictured in 2006), the 2004 ARCA champion. This was the sixth of his 10 championships in the series and fifth of 8 straight.

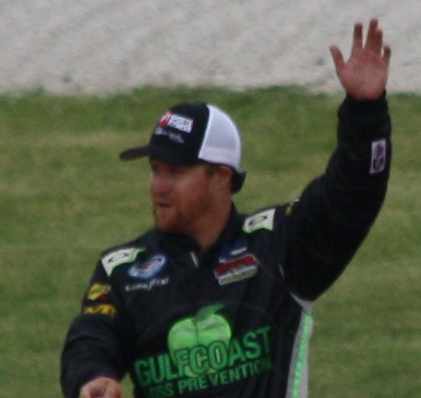
T. J. Bell finished third in the championship standings.

The 2004 ARCA Re/Max Series was the 52nd season of the ARCA Racing Series, a division of the Automobile Racing Club of America (ARCA). The season began on February 7, 2004, with the Daytona ARCA 200 at Daytona International Speedway. The season ended with the Food World 250 at Talladega Superspeedway on October 2 almost eight months later. Frank Kimmel won the driver's championship, his sixth in the series (Tying Iggy Katona for most ARCA Series championships all-time) and his fifth in a row, while T. J. Bell won the Rookie of the Year award.

== Schedule and results ==
Date	Track	City	Event name	Pole winner	Race winner
February 7	Daytona International Speedway	Daytona Beach, Florida	Daytona ARCA 200	Bobby Gerhart	Kyle Busch
April 9	Nashville Superspeedway	Lebanon, Tennessee	PFG Lester 150	Ryan Hemphill	Blake Feese
April 25	Salem Speedway	Washington Township, Indiana	Kentuckiana Ford Dealers 200	Frank Kimmel	Frank Kimmel
May 8	Kentucky Speedway	Sparta, Kentucky	The Channel 5 205	Frank Kimmel	Ryan Hemphill
May 16	Toledo Speedway	Toledo, Ohio	Hickory Foods 200 presented by Federated Car Care	Ken Schrader	Ken Schrader
May 27	Lowe's Motor Speedway	Concord, North Carolina	Quaker Steak & Lube 200	Ryan Hemphill	Ryan Hemphill
June 5	Kansas Speedway	Kansas City, Kansas	Kansas Lottery $200 Grand	Ryan Hemphill	Ryan Hemphill
June 12	Pocono Raceway	Long Pond, Pennsylvania	Pocono ARCA 200	Frank Kimmel	Scott Riggs
June 19	Michigan Speedway	Brooklyn, Michigan	Flagstar 200	Justin Hobgood	Reed Sorenson
June 26	South Boston Speedway	South Boston, Virginia	ARCA Re/Max 200	Brent Sherman	Frank Kimmel
July 3	Berlin Raceway	Marne, Michigan	Sara Lee/GFS Marketplace 200	Fred Campbell	Frank Kimmel
July 10	Kentucky Speedway	Sparta, Kentucky	Kentucky 150 on 700 WLWT Pole Night	Frank Kimmel	Ryan Hemphill
July 16	Gateway International Raceway	Madison, Illinois	Shop 'n Save 150	Ryan Hemphill	Ryan Hemphill
July 31	Pocono Raceway	Long Pond, Pennsylvania	Giant 200	Ryan Hemphill	Ryan Hemphill
August 7	Lake Erie Speedway	Greenfield Township, Pennsylvania	ARCA Re/Max 200 by Hamot/Siemens, Giant Eagle Pork	Frank Kimmel	Frank Kimmel
August 14	Nashville Superspeedway	Lebanon, Tennessee	Waste Management 200	Ryan Hemphill	Joey Miller
August 22	Illinois State Fairgrounds	Springfield, Illinois	Allen Crowe Memorial ARCA 100	A. J. Fike	Bill Baird
September 3	Toledo Speedway	Toledo, Ohio	Hantz Group 200	Josh Richeson	Frank Kimmel
September 6	DuQuoin State Fairgrounds	Du Quoin, Illinois	Southern Illinois 100	Ken Schrader	Frank Kimmel
September 11	Chicagoland Speedway	Joliet, Illinois	SK Hand Tool 200	Stuart Kirby	Kyle Krisiloff
September 18	Salem Speedway	Washington Township, Indiana	Eddie Gilstrap Motors ARCA Fall Classic	Frank Kimmel	Jason Jarrett
October 2	Talladega Superspeedway	Lincoln, Alabama	Food World 250	Frank Kimmel	Blake Feese

=== Drivers' championship ===
(key) Bold – Pole position awarded by time. Italics – Pole position set by final practice results or rainout. * – Most laps led. ** – All laps led.

Pos.	Driver	Races																						Points
Pos.	Driver	DAY	NSH	SLM	KEN	TOL	CLT	KAN	POC	MCH	SBO	BER	KEN	GTW	POC	LER	NSH	ISF	TOL	DQN	CHI	SLM	TAL	Points
1	Frank Kimmel	2	4	**1***	**20**	10	3	2	9	10	1*	1*	5	2	2	**1***	3*	2*	1	1*	31	**23***	**27**	5930
2	Brent Sherman	11	32	5	12	7	23	5	10	4	**2**	4	12	7	4	2	21	6	30	18	4	10	5	5270
3	T. J. Bell	20	30	10	22	13	9	11	11	24	6	5	13	8	5	5	6	28	5	3	2*	7	6	5140
4	Billy Venturini	3	12	3	2	12	20	6	4	30	3	7	23	6	8	4	29	8	28	13	6	20	24	5015
5	Jason Jarrett	14	36	2	10	2	18	3	6	40	19	23	14	5	9	3	9	4	18	19	15	1	30	4860
6	Mark Gibson	21	27	9	3	5	40	7	8	7	8	14	8	24	21	12	12	32	19	5	11	3	16	4755
7	A. J. Fike	18	10	15	17	6	12	16	28	38	9	2	25	3	28	6	5	**20**	25	17	8	8	18	4715
8	Christi Passmore	27	24	26	5	27	27	10	26	5	7	13	7	4	6	8	14	11	11	21	3	9	40	4690
9	Todd Bowsher	12	17	23	7	14	29	12	14	16	26	10	9	11	7	24	16	26	12	12	22	21	31	4475
10	Norm Benning	31	31	18	24	8	33	17	17	21	4	11	28	14	16	11	22	3	9	7	19	4	25	4445
11	Darrell Basham	24	20	11	14	19	26	19	13	26	13	17	24	15	15	14	23	14	22	25	16	19	17	4280
12	Mike Buckley	19	14	17	13	11	15	35	24	22	18	24	22	12	12	18	19	21	33	26	18	11	15	4215
13	Brandon Knupp	DNQ	11	4	38	24	41	18	19	18	21	15	17	22	10	16	31	17	10	14	24	18	38	3980
14	Brad Smith	32	16	20	16	20	35	14	21	28	20	22	27	18	17	19	DNQ	15	29	16	DNQ	16	32	3735
15	Joe Cooksey			8			34	22	12	15	5	8	16	17	13	13	20	12	6	9	12	32	36	3700
16	Tim Mitchell	DNQ	DNQ	34	30	30	25	34	31	29	27	26	35	29	26	28	33	35	34	34	DNQ	30	22	2835
17	Ryan Hemphill	5	**15***		1*	4	**1**	**1**	7*	33			1**	**1***	**1***		**40**				28		4	2780
18	Tim Turner	DNQ	DNQ	16	25	22	DNQ	23	36	DNQ	17	18	33	20	38	32	25	18		30	DNQ	DNQ	DNQ	2630
19	Bobby Gerhart	**6**							5	8	14		10	9	3	7	27		4				20	2030
20	Josh Allison			14		26					11	6				15		24	23	24		15		1320
21	Billy Walker										31	28		30	34	29	39	19		35	DNQ		DNQ	1215
22	Andy Belmont	33		7	35			36	25	DNQ	30				11			27	26	33		31		1135
23	Michael Simko					16	10			20			11						21		7	25		1080
24	Ken Schrader		5			**1***			2					23						**8**				1050
25	Ken Weaver		25		4		DNQ						29	DNQ	31		17			11	23		DNQ	1020
26	Marty Butkovich			13		17				19		20				25			16			14		990
27	Johnny Leonard	15	33				14			12			30				18						13	940
28	Jeff Kendall	10	DNQ		23			4		35				13							14			915
29	Ron Cox	22	37	6	11	25																		895
30	A. J. Henriksen	40				Wth	6		3	3								23			36		39	885
31	Blake Feese		1		8		7																1	885
32	David Ragan	25	19	19	37		19			32			2											865
33	Randy Van Zant			29								16				10		22		6		22		855
34	Brian Keselowski				9		38						18	25			10		8					840
35	Justin Allgaier					29								27				10	2	4				835
36	Boston Reid					3		8					6										23	760
37	Bobby Bowsher							28	34					31	33	31		7		20	37			735
38	Ryan Howard											27			32	20	37	13	DNQ			6		730
39	Reed Sorenson						4*			1*													2	720
40	Jeff Caudell		34	22	15				33					16								13		715
41	Keith Murt	37	13		6		11			34													34	705
42	Todd Antrican			30	33	31							37					33	DNQ	36			DNQ	705
43	Terry Jones			12		23			16	13					29									685
44	Tandy Marlin		7										3				11				29			670
45	Kyle Krisiloff															9	2				1			660
46	Roger Williams	DNQ					21			11											17		10	650
47	Clair Zimmerman					15					12					17			17					615
48	Chuck Weber														24		15				13		12	605
49	Jason Basham			32				30	29					19	37			34		38	Wth			590
50	Wayne Anderson	29	6		26		5																	590
51	Frank Kapfhammer		29	28	21								19								21	DNQ		585
52	Wayne Peterson				36			21	38	DNQ	24			33	DNQ					23	Wth			580
53	Greg Sarff	17								14	28		21	DNQ										570
54	Jennifer Jo Cobb							9									7				10			560
55	Walt Brannen					18							4				24				30			540
56	Mike Haggenbottom								20						23			16	DNQ	22				540
57	Benny Chastain										22		34	28	18								26	510
58	Josh Clemons		9		28								DNQ									5		510
59	Garrett Liberty					28						21		DNQ		27	28		31					500
60	Mike Harmon									17			26				34		15				DNQ	490
61	Aaron Call	QL	41	31	40	32		QL																480
62	Bill Baird																	1		2				465
63	Matt Hagans			27	31					2			38											450
64	Phil Bozell		23							9			39	21										450
65	Rick Tackman			24														9		32		34		425
66	Burt Ingle		DNQ					25					32		22		26							420
67	Bill Eversole					21				6		29												410
68	Red Farmer																	5		10				400
69	Chris Moore																DNQ				5		14	390
70	Jeremy Clements	DNQ	8		29		37	37																380
71	Billy Shotko											3							14					375
72	Chevy White																8				9			375
73	Howard Bixman				27					DNQ			20								25			355
74	Eric Smith								15						14						39			350
75	Stuart Kirby																36				**38**		7	340
76	Mike Zazula								23		29				19									335
77	Larry Hollenbeck	16								31											26			325
78	Sam Hafertepe																13				40		21	320
79	Dan Shaver	34					17			DNQ								Wth			Wth		28	320
80	Joey Miller																1				32			315
81	Klaus Graf		3																				29	310
82	Carl McCormick				18		DNQ															17		310
83	Justin Hobgood						2			**39**			40											305
84	John Busse				Wth			38						32	27							33		300
85	Tony Altiere	DNQ						26	30						30									285
86	Mike Langston	9	26																					285
87	Mike Koch							33	37					34	35		41							280
88	Will Langhorne																		13			24		280
89	Bob Aiello							32			10												DNQ	275
90	Michael Guerity						39			25									32		35			270
91	Dale Schweikart								18						20									270
92	Billy Deckman							13						26										265
93	Richard King		35				16										35							260
94	Brack Maggard	41								27													19	260
95	Mario Gosselin						36										4							260
96	Jimmy Henderson												15				30						DNQ	260
97	Kyle Busch	1*																						255
98	Anthony Hill		DNQ						22	DNQ			31											245
99	Casey Atwood		2																					245
100	Frog Hall							31										30		31				230
101	Josh Richeson																		**24***			29		230
102	Scott Riggs								1															230
103	Jim Walker	38																					9	225
104	Chad Blount	7																			41			225
105	G. R. Smith															21			27					220
106	Justin South																					2		220
107	Brian Campbell																		3					215
108	Denny Hamlin																						3	215
109	Ray Cook									DNQ													8	215
110	Fred Campbell											**9**												215
111	Shane Hmiel	4																						210
112	Jim Hollenbeck					DNQ				DNQ		25							DNQ		DNQ			205
113	Kelly Bires						8																	200
114	Ricky Gonzalez																				27	26		195
115	Bob Blount																		7					195
116	Clint Bowyer	8																						195
117	Chris Anthony											12							DNQ					195
118	Damon Lusk						28													27				185
119	Travis Powell											19	36											185
120	Steve Cronenwett					9																		185
121	Ed Kennedy	23																					33	180
122	Brad Keselowski				32		24																	180
123	Scott Kuhn													10										180
124	Tim Burrell																	29		28				175
125	Jason Rudd														25		32							175
126	Rich Woodland Jr.																						11	175
127	Clay Greenfield																					12		170
128	Eric McClure	13																						165
129	Mart Nesbitt						13																	165
130	Ed Wettlaufer															23			DNQ			DNQ		165
131	Lance Deiters										15													155
132	Kelly Kovski																			15				155
133	Scott Traylor							15																155
134	Tony Quarles										16							Wth						150
135	Robbin Slaughter															26			DNQ			DNQ		150
136	Brent Cross															22						DNQ		145
137	Drew White		39						35						36									140
138	Cain Langford		18																					140
139	Greg Sacks	28	38																					135
140	Mark Schulz				19																			135
141	James Hylton							20	40															130
142	Robert Richardson Jr.																				20			130
143	Chris Serio																		20					130
144	L. W. Miller			21																				125
145	Randal Ritter		21																					125
146	Dicky Williamson	26																					DNQ	125
147	Bryan Gandy																				33		35	120
148	Chris Comalander		22																					120
149	Ryan Thigpen						22																	120
150	John Ellis										32									37				115
151	Jerry Glanville									23														115
152	Donny Kelley										23													115
153	Roger Moser							24																110
154	Dean MacInnis						DNQ	29																110
155	Ron Salmons Jr.			25																				105
156	Peyton Sellers										25													105
157	Perry Tripp																	25						105
158	John Hayden																					27		100
159	Kevin Gingrich							27																95
160	Kevin Ray								27						DNQ									95
161	Doug Reid III						32																DNQ	95
162	Brad Payne																					28		90
163	Don St. Denis		28																					90
164	Paul Booher			33	Wth																			90
165	Billy Thomas																			29				85
166	Chuck Hiers	30																						80
167	Chuck McMinn															30								80
168	Greg Seevers											30												80
169	Jason Vieau						30																	80
170	Ian Henderson						31																	75
171	Charlie Schaefer																	31						75
172	Brian Kaltreider								32															70
173	Paul Menard	35																						70
174	Tim Finch															33								65
175	George Lindsey					33																		65
176	Tim Steele																				34			65
177	Cory Witherill																	38			DNQ			65
178	Mike Burg				34																			60
179	Kim Crosby	39																					DNQ	60
180	Vern Slagh	QL			39																			60
181	John Sadinsky													35										55
182	Andy Hillenburg	36																						50
183	Nick McIntosh																	36						50
184	C. W. Smith									36														50
185	Justin Ashburn																						37	45
186	Chad McCumbee									37														45
187	Tom Bartoszek								39															35
188	Jeremy Curtis																			39				35
189	Todd Bodine		40																					30
190	Butch Jarvis	DNQ																						
191	Nevin George	DNQ																						
192	Michael Jacobs	DNQ	DNQ																					
193	David Ray Boggs						DNQ																	
194	Robbie Cowart						DNQ																	
195	Charles Hudson						DNQ																	
196	Andy Lombi						DNQ																	
197	Brandon Whitt						DNQ																	
198	Tom Berte						DNQ														DNQ			
199	Frank Bigler							DNQ																
200	Josh Weston																DNQ							
201	Brandon Kelley																		DNQ					
202	Tracy Leslie																		DNQ					
203	Gary Camelet																				DNQ			
204	Bernie Evans																				DNQ			
205	B. J. Mackey																					DNQ		
206	Homer Woolslayer																					DNQ		
207	Davis Morris																					DNQ		
208	Kertus Davis																						DNQ	
209	Steve Bramley																						DNQ	
210	Jason Hawley		Wth																					
211	Deborah Renshaw	QL																						
Pos.	Driver	DAY	NSH	SLM	KEN	TOL	CLT	KAN	POC	MCH	SBO	BER	KEN	GTW	POC	LER	NSH	ISF	TOL	DQN	CHI	SLM	TAL	Points
