= Walt Brannen =

American racing driver

- Born: October 24, 1983 (age 43); Elko, Georgia, U.S.

ARCA Menards Series career
- 9 races run over 4 years
- Best finish: 43rd (2005)
- First race: 2004 Hickory Farms 200 by Federated Car Care (Toledo)
- Last race: 2006 Daytona ARCA 200 (Daytona)
Wins	Top tens	Poles
0	3	0
- Statistics up to date as of November 29, 2024.

Walt Brannen (born October 24, 1983) is an American former professional stock car racing driver who has competed in the ARCA Re/Max Series from 2004 to 2006.

Brannen has also competed in the ASA CRA Super Series and the Southern All Star Super Late Model Series.

== Motorsports results ==
=== ARCA Re/Max Series ===
(key) (Bold – Pole position awarded by qualifying time. Italics – Pole position earned by points standings or practice time. * – Most laps led. ** – All laps led.)

ARCA Re/Max Series results
Year	Team	No.	Make	1	2	3	4	5	6	7	8	9	10	11	12	13	14	15	16	17	18	19	20	21	22	23	ARMSC	Pts	Ref
2004	Andy Belmont Racing	4	Ford	DAY	NSH	SLM	KEN	TOL; 18	CLT	KAN	POC	MCH	SBO	BLN													55th	540	
2004	Brack Maggard Racing	65	Dodge												KEN; 4	GTW	POC	LER	NSH; 24	ISF	TOL	DSF	CHI; 30	SLM	TAL		55th	540	
2005	Brack Maggard Racing	65	Dodge	DAY; 37	NSH; 40	SLM	KEN; 16	TOL	LAN	MIL	POC	MCH; 10	KAN	KEN; 8	BLN	POC	GTW	LER	NSH	MCH; 26	ISF	TOL	DSF	CHI	SLM	TAL; 32	43rd	765	
2006	Brack Maggard Racing	65	Dodge	DAY; 34	NSH	SLM	WIN	KEN	TOL	POC	MCH	KAN	KEN	BLN	POC	GTW	NSH	MCH	ISF	MIL	TOL	DSF	CHI	SLM	TAL	IOW	162nd	60	
