= Christi Passmore =

American racing driver

- Born: May 27, 1982 (age 44); Pryor, Oklahoma, U.S.

ARCA Menards Series career
- 66 races run over 5 years
- Best finish: 8th (2003), (2004)
- First race: 2002 Kentuckiana Ford Dealers 200 (Salem)
- Last race: 2006 Daytona ARCA 200 (Daytona)
Wins	Top tens	Poles
0	21	0
- Statistics up to date as of July 8, 2023.

Christi Passmore Mack (born May 27, 1982) is an American former professional stock car racing driver who has previously competed in the ARCA Re/Max Series and the World of Outlaws.

== Racing career ==
From 1998 to 2001, Passmore competed in various sprint car series' like the World of Outlaws, the Lucas Oil ASCS Sprint Car Dirt Series, the NCRA Outlaw Sprint Car Series, and the All Star Circuit of Champions.

In 2002, Passmore would make her ARCA Re/Max Series at Salem Speedway, driving the No. 91 Ford for Andy Belmont Racing, where she would finish nineteenth after starting fifth. She would make seven more starts that year with a best result of 23rd at Toledo Speedway and Chicagoland Speedway.

In 2003, Passmore would run the full ARCA schedule with her family owned team, where she would finish eighth in the points with seven top-tens and one top-five at Talladega Superspeedway on route to finishing runner-up in the rookie of the year standings behind Bill Eversole. She would finish eighth in the points standings again he following year, this time getting ten top-tens and four top-fives with a best finish of third at Chicagoland. Afterwards, she would run select races in 2005, getting four top-tens in thirteen starts with best finish of sixth at Pocono Raceway. She would run one more ARCA race in 2006, finishing 27th at Daytona International Speedway due to being involved in a multi-car crash late in the race. She has not competed in the series since then.

== Personal life ==
Passmore is currently the president for G.A.P. Roofing Inc., which served as her sponsor during her time in ARCA.

== Motorsports results ==
=== ARCA Re/Max Series ===
(key) (Bold – Pole position awarded by qualifying time. Italics – Pole position earned by points standings or practice time. * – Most laps led.)

ARCA Re/Max Series results
Year	Team	No.	Make	1	2	3	4	5	6	7	8	9	10	11	12	13	14	15	16	17	18	19	20	21	22	23	ARMC	Pts	Ref
2002	Andy Belmont Racing	91	Ford	DAY	ATL	NSH	SLM; 19	KEN; 41	CLT	KAN; 25	POC	MCH	TOL; 23	SBO	KEN	BLN; 24	POC; 37	NSH	ISF	WIN; 27	DSF	CHI; 23	SLM	TAL	CLT		37th	750	
2003	Christi Passmore Racing	91	Dodge	DAY; 28																							8th	4515	
2003	Christi Passmore Racing	91	Ford		ATL; 13	NSH; 9	SLM; 9	TOL; 17	KEN; 12	CLT; 14	BLN; 29	KAN; 25	MCH; 29	LER; 10	POC; 8	POC; 19	NSH; 11	ISF; 20	WIN; 23	DSF; 22	CHI; 9	SLM; 27	TAL; 5	CLT; 7	SBO; 28		8th	4515	
2004	Christi Passmore Racing	91	Ford	DAY; 27	NSH; 24	SLM; 26	KEN; 5	TOL; 27	CLT; 27	KAN; 10	POC; 26	MCH; 5	SBO; 7	BLN; 13	KEN; 7	GTW; 4	POC; 6	LER; 8	NSH; 14	ISF; 11	TOL; 11	DSF; 21	CHI; 3	SLM; 9	TAL; 40		8th	4690	
2005	Christi Passmore Racing	91	Ford	DAY; 24	NSH; 37	SLM; 10	KEN; 8	TOL; 20	LAN	MIL; Wth	POC; 6	MCH; 36	KAN; 29	KEN; 35	BLN	POC; 28	GTW; 32	LER	NSH	MCH	ISF	TOL	DSF	CHI; 39	SLM	TAL; 9	29th	1675	
2006	Christi Passmore Racing	91	Ford	DAY; 27	NSH	SLM	WIN	KEN	TOL	POC	MCH	KAN	KEN	BLN	POC	GTW	NSH	MCH	ISF	MIL	TOL	DSF	CHI	SLM	TAL	IOW	146th	95	
