= 2005 ARCA Re/Max Series =

American stock car racing series

2005 ARCA RE/MAX Series

Seasons
- ← 2004 2006 →

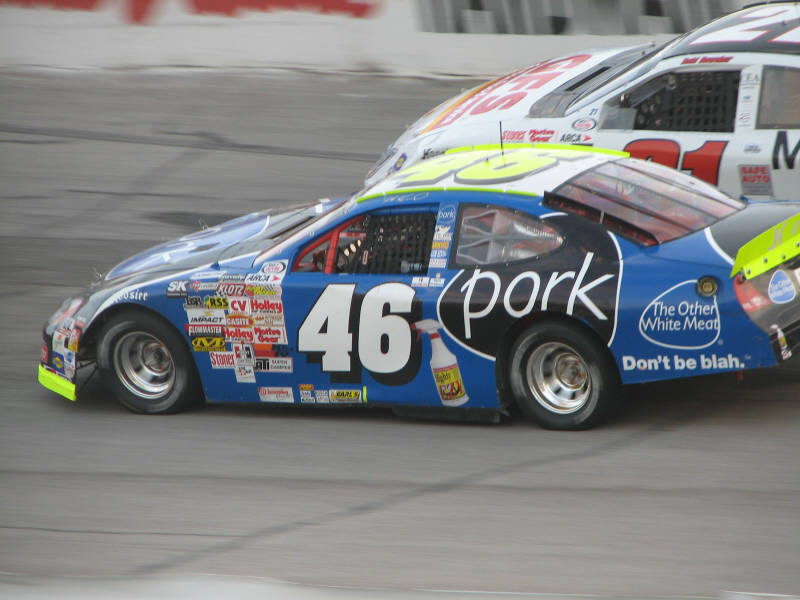
Frank Kimmel, driving the No. 46 car for Clement Racing, the 2005 ARCA champion. This was his sixth consecutive title and seventh overall in the series.

The 2005 ARCA Re/Max Series was the 53rd season of the ARCA Racing Series, a division of the Automobile Racing Club of America (ARCA). The season was scheduled to begin on February 7, 2005, with the Advance Discount Auto Parts 200 at Daytona International Speedway, and ended with the Food World 300 at Talladega Superspeedway eight months later. Frank Kimmel of Clement Racing won the driver's championship, his seventh in the series, surpassing Iggy Katona for the most championships in ARCA history. Joey Miller of Hagans Racing won the Rookie of the Year award whilst finishing second in the point standings.

== Schedule ==
The 2005 ARCA Re/MAX Series schedule consisted of twenty-three races, at seventeen tracks in twelve states. Fourteen events on the schedule were televised live by SPEED Channel.

No.	Race title	Track	City	Date	Network
1	Advance Discount Auto Parts 200	Daytona International Speedway	Daytona Beach, Florida	February 7	SPEED
2	PFG Lester 150	Nashville Superspeedway	Lebanon, Tennessee	March 26	SPEED
3	Kentuckiana Ford Dealers 200	Salem Speedway	Washington Township, Indiana	April 24	
4	Harley-Davidson of Cincinnati 150	Kentucky Speedway	Sparta, Kentucky	May 14	
5	Hantz Group 200	Toledo Speedway	Toledo, Ohio	May 22	SPEED
6	Williams Bros. 200	Lanier National Speedway	Braselton, Georgia	May 28	
7	ARCA 150	Milwaukee Mile	West Allis, Wisconsin	June 4	SPEED
8	Pocono 200	Pocono Raceway	Long Pond, Pennsylvania	June 11	SPEED
9	Hantz Group 200	Michigan International Speedway	Brooklyn, Michigan	June 17	SPEED
10	Kansas Lottery $200 Grand	Kansas Speedway	Kansas City, Kansas	July 2	SPEED
11	WLWT Channel 5 150	Kentucky Speedway	Sparta, Kentucky	July 8	SPEED
12	Request/Sara Lee ARCA 200	Berlin Raceway	Marne, Michigan	July 16	
13	Pennsylvania 200	Pocono Raceway	Long Pond, Pennsylvania	July 23	
14	Shop n' Save 150	Gateway International Raceway	Madison, Illinois	July 28	SPEED
15	ARCA 200	Lake Erie Speedway	Greenfield Township, Pennsylvania	August 5	
16	ARCA Re/MAX 200	Nashville Superspeedway,	Lebanon, Tennessee	August 13	SPEED
17	Hantz Group 200	Michigan International Speedway	Brooklyn, Michigan	August 19	SPEED
18	Allen Crowe Memorial 100	Illinois State Fairgrounds Racetrack	Springfield, Illinois	August 21	
19	Hantz Group 200 presented by Belle Tire	Toledo Speedway	Toledo, Ohio	September 2	SPEED
20	Southern Illinois 100	DuQuoin State Fairgrounds Racetrack	Du Quoin, Illinois	September 5	
21	SK Hand Tool 200	Chicagoland Speedway	Joliet, Illinois	September 10	SPEED
22	Eddie Gilstrap Motors Fall Classic	Salem Speedway	Washington Township, Indiana	September 17	
23	Food World 300	Talladega Superspeedway	Lincoln, Alabama	October 1	SPEED

== Results and standings ==
=== Races ===
No.	Race	Pole position	Most laps led	Winning driver	Manufacturer	No.	Winning team
1	Advance Discount Auto Parts 200	Bobby Gerhart	Bobby Gerhart	Bobby Gerhart	Chevrolet	5	Bobby Gerhart Racing
2	PFG Lester 150	Erin Crocker	Chad Blount	Chad Blount	Chevrolet	67	ML Motorsports
3	Kentuckiana Ford Dealers 200	Chad McCumbee	Chad Blount	Chad Blount	Chevrolet	67	ML Motorsports
4	Harley-Davidson of Cincinnati 150	Chad Blount	Chad Blount	Frank Kimmel	Ford	46	Clement Racing
5	Hantz Group 200	Frank Kimmel	Frank Kimmel	Ken Schrader	Chevrolet	99	Ken Schrader Racing
6	Williams Bros. 200	David Ragan	Joey Miller	David Ragan	Ford	90	Day Enterprise Racing
7	ARCA 150	David Ragan	Frank Kimmel	Frank Kimmel	Ford	46	Clement Racing
8	Pocono 200	Travis Kvapil	Travis Kvapil	Travis Kvapil	Dodge	27	Penske Racing
9	Hantz Group 200	Kyle Krisiloff	Frank Kimmel	Frank Kimmel	Ford	46	Clement Racing
10	Kansas Lottery $200 Grand	Joey Miller	Chad Blount	Chad Blount	Chevrolet	67	ML Motorsports
11	WLWT Channel 5 150	Erin Crocker	Chad Blount	Chad Blount	Chevrolet	67	ML Motorsports
12	Request/Sara Lee ARCA 200	Joey Miller	Joey Miller	Joey Miller	Dodge	9	Hagans Racing
13	Pennsylvania 200	Joey Miller	Frank Kimmel	Frank Kimmel	Ford	46	Clement Racing
14	Shop n' Save 150	Ken Schrader	Joey Miller	Joey Miller	Dodge	9	Hagans Racing
15	ARCA 200	Joey Miller	Frank Kimmel	Frank Kimmel	Ford	46	Clement Racing
16	ARCA Re/MAX 200	Joey Miller	Joey Miller	Joey Miller	Dodge	9	Hagans Racing
17	Hantz Group 200	Kyle Krisiloff	Steve Wallace	Steve Wallace	Dodge	27	Penske Racing
18	Allen Crowe Memorial 100	Justin Allgaier	Frank Kimmel	Frank Kimmel	Ford	46	Clement Racing
19	Hantz Group 200 presented by Belle Tire	David Ragan	Joey Miller	Frank Kimmel	Ford	46	Clement Racing
20	Southern Illinois 100	Brian Tyler	Justin Allgaier	Frank Kimmel	Ford	46	Clement Racing
21	SK Hand Tool 200	Joey Miller	Joey Miller	Dawayne Bryan	Dodge	65	Bryan Racing
22	Eddie Gilstrap Motors Fall Classic	Brett Hudson	Joey Miller	Joey Miller	Dodge	9	Hagans Racing
23	Food World 300	Kraig Kinser	Kraig Kinser	Kraig Kinser	Chevrolet	10	Fast Track Racing with MB2 Motorsports

=== Drivers' championship ===
(key) Bold – Pole position awarded by time. Italics – Pole position set by final practice results or rainout. * – Most laps led.

Pos.	Driver	Races																							Points
Pos.	Driver	DAY	NSH	SLM	KEN	TOL	LAN	MLW	POC	MCH	KAN	KEN	BLN	POC	GTW	LER	NSH	MCH	ISF	TOL	DQN	CHI	SLM	TAL	Points
1	Frank Kimmel	2	7	7	1	2^{*}	4	1^{*}	2	1^{*}	3	4	4	1^{*}	7	1^{*}	29	19	1^{*}	1	1	9	25	5	6000
2	Joey Miller **(R)**	7	2	6	3	8	2^{*}	2	3	28	**2**	3	**1**^{*}	**34**	1^{*}	**28**	**1**^{*}	38	11	8^{*}	6	**3**^{*}	1^{*}	38	5575
3	Ken Weaver **(R)**	15	6	9	4	15	26	15	27	3	33	10	23	5	11	3	2	6	9	5	24	26	2	14	5140
4	Chad McCumbee **(R)**	22	22	**20**	18	14	24	31	4	9	10	12	32	2	4	4	5	5	19	35	5	29	9	41	4720
5	Mark Gibson	30	17	13	9	10	12	8	22	29	12	22	15	14	8	14	14	18	4	30	7	7	33	27	4670
6	Brandon Knupp	DNQ	5	33	10	26	7	20	21	16	11	18	13	12	9	32	21	11	6	23	11	20	19	15	4545
7	Todd Bowsher	21	25	5	23	29	10	18	8	39	14	13	34	29	16	17	16	21	15	12	13	15	5	18	4465
8	Mike Harmon	8	34	26	15	12	9	9	24	25	26	26	25	9	15	15	11	32	20	28	15	18	27	16	4315
9	Jason Jarrett		9	18	17	3	3	11	9	22	6	38	29	6	10	8	7	13	10	34	29	40	35	22	4185
10	Johnny Leonard **(R)**	34	29	14	24	21	17	19	29	18	16	11	31	10	22	19	9	29	28	10	16	30	12	29	4160
11	Norm Benning	10	19	19	33	13	22	35	13	23	19	30	18	24	28	25	31	22	13	19	23	19	20	20	4050
12	Darrell Basham	DNQ	24	16	28	19	16	24	14	37	7	37	16	16	21	16	18	40	16	26	20	22	17	17	4000
13	Andy Belmont	DNQ	30	15	29	34	15	23	33	40	9	15	30	18	18	11	17	15	18	9	27	28	18	33	3910
14	David Ragan **(R)**	32	DNQ	3	12	4	**1**	29	26	27		17	6	4	2		30	4		**2**	10	2	16	8	3820
15	Bill Eversole	35	38	17	27	24	14	21	16	13	8	31	35	11	17	9	26	31	5	31	22				3455
16	Brad Smith	DNQ	DNQ	DNQ	19	DNQ	20	25	12	38	39	23	22	17	25	24	28	25	23	29	35	21	23	40	3285
17	Tim Mitchell	DNQ	DNQ	30	25	31	31	33	15	41	32	39	DNQ	36	41	33	25	27	22	32	25	31	22	25	2950
18	Chad Blount	33	1	1^{*}	**2**^{*}	9	5	3	32	2	1^{*}	1^{*}	7												2845
19	Tim Turner	DNQ	DNQ	DNQ	DNQ	DNQ	23	27	17	24	23	28	DNQ	20	31	22	24	DNQ	DNQ	33	31	DNQ	DNQ	34	2805
20	Bobby Gerhart	**1**^{*}	41			16		5	10	34	4	9		7	12	5	15			11		16		3	2555
21	Michael Simko		21	12	14	11	32	12		26		20				18		24		13		10	3	QL	2195
22	Jason Basham	DNQ	DNQ	DNQ	DNQ	DNQ	DNQ	38	41	DNQ	21	DNQ	DNQ	26	39	DNQ	35	DNQ	28	Wth	39	DNQ	DNQ	DNQ	2130
23	Benny Chastain	41			DNQ		DNQ	36	25	DNQ	36	DNQ	DNQ	30	38	DNQ	27	DNQ	31	DNQ	21	27	26	DNQ	2070
24	Kyle Krisiloff **(R)**	13	13		36			16	7	**5**	2	6		32	33		34	**37**				23		2	1960
25	Ricky Gonzalez		DNQ	32	DNQ	DNQ	DNQ	34	20	DNQ		DNQ	DNQ	31	35	DNQ	38	DNQ	33	DNQ	38	DNQ	DNQ	DNQ	1885
26	Michael Guerity	4	DNQ		26				5	31	28	27		8	13		13	2		21				7	1860
27	Joe Cooksey	23	18	24	32	28	34	17	36	21					30	29		DNQ	3		14				1720
28	Billy Venturini	14										32	27			2				3	8	8	4	28	1700
29	Christi Passmore	24	37	10	8	20		Wth	6	36	29	35		28	32							39		9	1675
30	T. J. Bell	6	39	2	40	5	30	7	31	20		33							29						1570
31	Justin Allgaier			34		DNQ		6			13	5			29				**2**	4	4^{*}				1380
32	Josh Allison			31		17	6	10					20			20			25	22	3		30		1380
33	Erin Crocker		**12**							7		**2**		3			3							4	1285
34	Brian Keselowski	DNQ				DNQ				17		7	9			7		7		7			29		1250
35	Ryan Howard	DNQ		DNQ	39	35	25	37	35	DNQ	34		DNQ	33	37		37	41	21		36	DNQ		DNQ	1140
36	Brett Hudson			8		18		30					10			6				20			**13**		1110
37	Mike Koch			DNQ	DNQ	DNQ		40	39		Wth					DNQ	DNQ	DNQ	DNQ	DNQ	32	DNQ	DNQ	Wth	1035
38	Erik Darnell							4							5		8	20				32		13	980
39	Danny O'Quinn Jr.				37					6		16			6		6					12			965
40	Brian Tyler					6							2							6	26			12	920
41	Ken Schrader			22		1									**3**			3			34				865
42	Ron Cox								34		15	21	12	13			12								850
43	Walt Brannen	37	40		16					10		8						26						32	765
44	Mario Gosselin	20	3						23	35								10				33			760
45	Billy Leslie			25		DNQ		22					14			13			DNQ	14			DNQ		760
46	Robert Richardson Jr.	26	14		13										19			23						30	755
47	Gary Sherman					DNQ							5		24	10				DNQ			7		740
48	G. R. Smith	16	35	27	22	32																			740
49	Terry Jones	DNQ	27		11	25				14								DNQ		16					735
50	Justin South			4		33							11							27			8		735
51	Randy Van Zant			23									24			12			18				10		715
52	Steve Wallace					7		32										1^{*}				4			710
53	Tim Steele	29								30			3									5	32		655
54	Dexter Bean	25																9				14		10	635
55	Phil Bozell					DNQ				15		25			20			34			19				610
56	Jeff Caudell			21	30		21					DNQ	33										14		580
57	Jim Locke												DNQ	38		DNQ	DNQ	DNQ	34	DNQ		DNQ	DNQ	DNQ	580
58	David Odell						27										4					36	6		555
59	Justin Ashburn	28		DNQ								36		37	27	30	33		26						550
60	A. J. Henriksen	17				DNQ				4				DNQ				DNQ				38	31		550
61	Josh Clemons		11	28								19											21		530
62	Frank Kapfhammer		16	DNQ	34							DNQ			DNQ		20						24		525
63	Burt Ingle		DNQ						19		24			21			23								510
64	Matt Hagans	5								DNQ				DNQ			DNQ	39				DNQ			495
65	Jim Hollenbeck					22				DNQ			17				19			DNQ		DNQ			475
66	Zach Chappell		8		31					32	18														475
67	Dale Schweikart								11					15		21									455
68	Kraig Kinser																	8						**1**^{*}	450
69	Jeff Harrison																10	36		15		DNQ			410
70	Clair Zimmerman	38				23										26				17					400
71	Damon Lusk													27	14			17							400
72	Larry Hollenbeck									33								14				11			400
73	Kevin Hamlin				5					8															400
74	Billy Walker	DNQ	DNQ	DNQ	DNQ	DNQ	DNQ																		400
75	Chase Miller		26			DNQ									23			16							395
76	Bubba Pollard				20					11								28							395
77	James Hylton										22			22	26		36		DNQ						390
78	Wayne Peterson					DNQ			40	DNQ	37			40	40	DNQ			35		DNQ		DNQ		385
79	Ronnie Hornaday			11			8																		380
80	Marc Mitchell	27	32		7																				380
81	Bill Baird																		12		9				355
82	Don St. Denis		10			27												30							355
83	Dominic Vara		31							12	25														350
84	A. J. Fike																		8		17				350
85	Clay Greenfield		DNQ																			DNQ	DNQ	DNQ	350
86	Bob Strait																		24		2				345
87	Kelly Kovski																		14		12				330
88	Chevy White		4		DNQ												32								305
89	Dana White						28					40					22					DNQ	DNQ		290
90	Stuart Kirby				6	30																			290
91	Dawayne Bryan											34										1			290
92	Will Langhorne																			25			11		285
93	Dan Shaver	19																	17						280
94	Gary Camelet					DNQ		26					21					DNQ							275
95	Doug Keller																		7		30				275
96	Howard Bixman		20		35					DNQ		29													270
97	Josh Krug				21						40							33				37			260
98	Tandy Marlin		23									24					DNQ								255
99	Travis Kvapil								**1**^{*}																250
100	Marty Butkovich					DNQ							26			31		DNQ		DNQ					250
101	David Ray Boggs			DNQ		DNQ	33												32		33				250
102	Mike Buckley					DNQ				DNQ		DNQ	DNQ	25											230
103	J. J. Yeley	3																							215
104	Steve Blackburn				DNQ							14						DNQ							210
105	Davin Scites																					6			200
106	Burney Lamar																							6	200
107	Brent Cross								30							23									195
108	Billy Deckman										20				34										190
109	Billy Shotko												8												190
110	Jeff Spraker	9																							185
111	Todd Kluever	11																							180
112	Kyle Beattie						11																		175
113	Craig Butts																							11	175
114	Jeremy Clements																					34		23	175
115	Brian Kaltreider								18					39											175
116	Ryan Hackett																	12							170
117	Larry Foyt	12																							170
118	Stan Boyd																					24	34		170
119	Joel Kauffman																					13			165
120	Terry Lawrence						13																		165
121	Roland Rehfeld							13																	165
122	Art Seeger													19				DNQ							160
123	Josh Richeson							14																	160
124	Sam Hafertepe		15																						155
125	Chris Moore																						15		155
126	Ed Wettlaufer			DNQ		DNQ				DNQ			DNQ			35									155
127	Dean MacInnis										17														145
128	Greg Sacks																					17			145
129	Mike Zazula								28	DNQ				DNQ											140
130	Doug Reid III	18																							140
131	Jeremy Petty																				18				140
132	Ted Olswfski													23											140
133	Jonathan Lewis													35	36		39								140
134	Cale Langford						18																		140
135	John Hayden											DNQ								DNQ			28		140
136	D. J. Richardson																							19	135
137	Jim Pate									19															135
138	Skip McCord												19												135
139	Jeff Buice						19																		135
140	Steve Bramley	DNQ																						24	135
141	Justin Marks																							21	125
142	Tom Berte							28														41			120
143	Chad Martin		28		DNQ																				120
144	Chris Anthony												28							DNQ					115
145	Bobby Dotter																			24					110
146	Richard King		DNQ				29																		110
147	Chris McKeehan															34				DNQ			DNQ		110
148	Keith Murt	39																						31	110
149	György Makai																					25			105
150	Ed Kennedy	31																						DNQ	100
151	Jason Hedlesky																							26	100
152	Butch Jarvis	DNQ	DNQ	DNQ	DNQ																			DNQ	100
153	Dwight Copp															27									95
154	Scott Traylor										27														95
155	Drew White							39	38																90
156	Eddie Pearson																				28				90
157	Robbin Slaughter			29		DNQ																			85
158	William Gillis																		30						80
159	Patrick Sheltra				DNQ																	35			80
160	J. J. Sonneveldt										30														80
161	Joe Wallace										31														75
162	Mike Popplewell												DNQ							DNQ			DNQ		75
163	Scott Stovall		33																						65
164	Blake Feese	36																							60
165	Roger Williams	DNQ																						39	60
166	John O'Neal Jr.										35														55
167	Brack Maggard																							35	55
168	Jarit Johnson																	35							60
169	Anthony Hill						35																		55
170	Bobby East																							36	50
171	Denny Hamlin		36																						50
172	Cory Collum					DNQ	DNQ																		50
173	Richard Hampton			DNQ		DNQ																			50
174	Jeff Sennett								37																45
175	Greg Seevers																				37				45
176	Aric Almirola																							37	45
177	Johnny Chapman				38																				40
178	Tony Ackerland										38														35
179	Eddie Mercer	40																							30
180	J. R. Patton	DNQ																							25
181	Paul White	DNQ																							25
182	Sam Beam	DNQ																							25
183	Kertus Davis	DNQ																							25
184	Dicky Williamson	DNQ																							25
185	Eric Wallace		DNQ																						25
186	Cain Langford		DNQ																						25
187	Aaron Tull			DNQ																					25
188	Scotty Sands			DNQ																					25
189	Randy Havlik				DNQ																				25
190	Jeremy Campbell					DNQ																			25
191	Rick Tackman							DNQ																	25
192	Kim Krebs											DNQ													25
193	Chris Serio															DNQ									25
194	Craig Bracken																			DNQ					25
195	Jeffery MacZink																			DNQ					25
196	Greg Barnhart																					DNQ			25
197	Billy Wease																					DNQ			25
198	Jon Morley																					DNQ			25
199	Hans-Peter Schaeppi																						DNQ		25
200	Casey Dean																						DNQ		25
201	Donnie Neuenberger																							DNQ	25
202	Scott Davis																							DNQ	25
203	Jim Walker						DNQ																		0
204	Tony Quarles																		DNQ						0
Pos.	Driver	DAY	NSH	SLM	KEN	TOL	LAN	MLW	POC	MCH	KAN	KEN	BLN	POC	GTW	LER	NSH	MCH	ISF	TOL	DQN	CHI	SLM	TAL	Points
Pos.	Driver	Races																							Points

== See also ==
- 2005 NASCAR Nextel Cup Series
- 2005 NASCAR Busch Series
- 2005 NASCAR Craftsman Truck Series
- 2005 NASCAR Whelen Modified Tour
- 2005 NASCAR Whelen Southern Modified Tour
