= Eddie Mercer =

American racing driver

- Born: May 18, 1958 (age 68); Pensacola, Florida, U.S.

ARCA Menards Series career
- 5 races run over 4 years
- Best finish: 94th (2009)
- First race: 2005 Advance Discount Auto Parts 200 (Daytona)
- Last race: 2009 ARCA Re/Max 250 (Talladega)
Wins	Top tens	Poles
0	0	0
- Statistics up to date as of January 27, 2025.

Eddie Mercer (born May 14, 1958) is an American former professional stock car racing driver who has previously competed in the ARCA Racing Series from 2005 to 2009.

Mercer has also competed in series such as the ASA CRA Super Series, the NASCAR Southeast Series, the NASCAR Southwest Series, and the Southern All Star Super Late Model Series. He is also a former winner of the Snowball Derby, having won it in 2005.

== Motorsports results ==
=== ARCA Re/Max Series ===
(key) (Bold – Pole position awarded by qualifying time. Italics – Pole position earned by points standings or practice time. * – Most laps led.)

ARCA Re/Max Series results
Year	Team	No.	Make	1	2	3	4	5	6	7	8	9	10	11	12	13	14	15	16	17	18	19	20	21	22	23	ARSC	Pts	Ref
2005	Bobby Jones Racing	88	Dodge	DAY; 40	NSH	SLM	KEN	TOL	LAN	MIL	POC	MCH	KAN	KEN	BLN	POC	GTW	LER	NSH	MCH	ISF	TOL	DSF	CHI	SLM	TAL	179th	30	
2007	Phoenix Racing	09	Chevy	DAY	USA	NSH	SLM	KAN	WIN	KEN	TOL	IOW	POC	MCH	BLN	KEN	POC	NSH	ISF	MIL	GTW	DSF	CHI	SLM	TAL; 30	TOL	158th	80	
2008	Phoenix Racing	51	Chevy	DAY	SLM	IOW	KAN	CAR	KEN	TOL	POC	MCH	CAY	KEN	BLN	POC	NSH	ISF	DSF	CHI	SLM	NJE	TAL; 13	TOL			108th	165	
2009	Phoenix Racing	51	Chevy	DAY; 29	SLM	CAR																					94th	235	
2009	Phoenix Racing	51	Toyota				TAL; 16	KEN	TOL	POC	MCH	MFD	IOW	KEN	BLN	POC	ISF	CHI	TOL	DSF	NJE	SLM	KAN	CAR			94th	235	
