= Johnny Leonard (racing driver) =

American racing driver

- Born: June 28, 1969 (age 57); Cape Coral, Florida, U.S.

ARCA Menards Series career
- 42 races run over 4 years
- Best finish: 10th (2005)
- First race: 2003 ARCA Re/Max 200 Presented by Hamot & Siemens (Lake Erie)
- Last race: 2006 Hantz Group 200 by Belle Tire & It's Mighty Ezy (Toledo)
Wins	Top tens	Poles
0	3	0
- Statistics up to date as of January 11, 2024.

Johnny Leonard (born June 28, 1969) is an American former professional stock car racing driver who has previously competed in the ARCA Re/Max Series.

== Racing career ==
Prior to his ARCA career, Leonard raced late-models in his home state of Florida, and competed in series like the FASCAR Goodyear Challenge Series.

In 2003, Leonard made his debut in the ARCA Re/Max Series at Lake Erie Speedway, driving the No. 14 Chevrolet for Jeff Caudell, where he started sixteenth and finished 26th. After failing to qualify at Winchester Speedway, he moved to Wayne Peterson Racing and the No. 6 Chevrolet for two races, finishing fifteenth at Salem Speedway, and 31st at South Boston Speedway. For the following year, Leonard competed sporadically throughout the year, running seven races and getting a best finish of twelfth at Michigan Speedway.

In 2005, Leonard, alongside racing partner and former hydroplane racer Rick Woodward, formed Florida Motorsports Group, and ran the full ARCA schedule that season, driving the No. 13 entry. Three races into the year, the team relocated from Florida to North Carolina, and was renamed to Boca Bay Racing for the remainder of the season. Alongside this, Leonard also announced that he would be running for rookie of the year honors. Throughout the year, Leonard scored three top-ten finishes with a best result of ninth at Nashville Superspeedway, and finished tenth in the final points standings, and fifth in the rookie of the year standings.

In 2006, Leonard ran the first eight races of the year, with a majority of those starts being fielded in collaboration with Mark Gibson Racing. He only finished inside the top-twenty once out of those eight starts, that being a twentieth place finish at Winchester. After the eighth race at Michigan, he did not attempt another race until the series returned to the track later in the year, where he failed to qualify, before making his final start of the year at Toledo Speedway, where he started 23rd and finished 21st. This would be his most recent event as a driver, as he has not competed in the series since then.

== Motorsports results ==
=== ARCA Re/Max Series ===
(key) (Bold – Pole position awarded by qualifying time. Italics – Pole position earned by points standings or practice time. * – Most laps led.)

ARCA Re/Max Series results
Year	Team	No.	Make	1	2	3	4	5	6	7	8	9	10	11	12	13	14	15	16	17	18	19	20	21	22	23	ARMC	Pts	Ref
2003	Jeff Caudell	14	Chevy	DAY	ATL	NSH	SLM	TOL	KEN	CLT	BLN	KAN	MCH	LER; 26	POC	POC	NSH	ISF	WIN; DNQ	DSF	CHI						80th	330	
2003	Wayne Peterson Racing	6	Chevy																			SLM; 15	TAL	CLT	SBO; 31		80th	330	
2004	Johnny Leonard	13	Pontiac	DAY; 15																					TAL; 13		27th	940	
2004	Johnny Leonard	13	Chevy		NSH; 33	SLM	KEN	TOL	CLT; 14	KAN	POC	MCH; 12	SBO	BLN	KEN; 30	GTW	POC	LER	NSH; 18	ISF	TOL	DSF	CHI	SLM			27th	940	
2005	Florida Motorsports Group	13	Pontiac	DAY; 34																							10th	4160	
2005	Florida Motorsports Group	13	Chevy		NSH; 29	SLM; 14																					10th	4160	
2005	Boca Bay Racing	13	Chevy				KEN; 24	TOL; 21	LAN; 17	MIL; 19	POC; 29	MCH; 18	KAN; 16	KEN; 11	BLN; 31	POC; 10	GTW; 22	LER; 19	NSH; 9	MCH; 29	ISF; 27	TOL; 10	DSF; 16	CHI; 30	SLM; 12	TAL; 29	10th	4160	
2006	Boca Bay Racing	13	Chevy	DAY; 30						POC; 32								MCH; DNQ	ISF	MIL	TOL; 21	DSF	CHI	SLM	TAL	IOW	37th	1095	
2006	Mark Gibson Racing	13	Chevy		NSH; 39	SLM; 27	WIN; 20	KEN; 32	TOL; 27		MCH; 22	KAN	KEN	BLN	POC	GTW	NSH										37th	1095	
