= Ed Kennedy (racing driver) =

American racing driver

- Nationality: American
- Born: August 23, 1950 (age 76) Coppell, Texas, U.S.

NASCAR Whelen Modified Tour career
- Debut season: 1987
- Years active: 1987, 1990–2001
- Starts: 127
- Championships: 0
- Wins: 0
- Poles: 2
- Best finish: 13th in 1995
- Statistics up to date as of September 3, 2024.

Ed Kennedy (born August 23, 1950) is an American former professional stock car racing driver who has previously competed in the NASCAR Featherlite Modified Tour from 1987 to 2001, where he achieved 31 top-ten finishes and two pole positions. He also competed in the ARCA Racing Series, primarily competing at Daytona International Speedway.

Kennedy also previously competed in what is now known as the ARCA Menards Series East, and the World Series of Asphalt Stock Car Racing.

== Motorsports results ==
=== NASCAR ===
(key) (Bold – Pole position awarded by qualifying time. Italics – Pole position earned by points standings or practice time. * – Most laps led.)

==== Featherlite Modified Tour ====
NASCAR Featherlite Modified Tour results
Year	Team	No.	Make	1	2	3	4	5	6	7	8	9	10	11	12	13	14	15	16	17	18	19	20	21	22	23	24	25	26	27	28	NFMTC	Pts	Ref
1987	Ed Kennedy	28	Chevy	ROU	MAR	TMP	STA	CNB	STA	MND	WFD	JEN	SPE	RIV	TMP	RPS; 23	EPP	RIV	STA	TMP	RIV	SEE	STA	POC	TIO	TMP	OXF	TMP	ROU	MAR	STA	N/A	0	
1990	Ed Kennedy	73	Chevy	MAR	TMP	RCH	STA	MAR	STA	TMP	MND	HOL	STA	RIV	JEN	EPP	RPS; 16	RIV		RPS; 17	NHA	TMP	POC	STA	TMP	MAR						N/A	0	
1990	Ed Kennedy	78	Chevy																TMP; 32													N/A	0	
1991	Ralph Solhem	1	Pontiac	MAR	RCH	TMP	NHA	MAR	NZH	STA	TMP	FLE	OXF	RIV	JEN	STA	RPS	RIV	RCH	TMP	NHA	TMP	POC	STA	TMP; 22	MAR; 24						N/A	0	
1992	Ralph Solhem	0	Chevy	MAR	TMP	RCH	STA	MAR	NHA; 23	NZH	STA	TMP	FLE	RIV	NHA	STA	RPS; 13	RIV	TMP	TMP	NHA	STA	MAR	TMP								N/A	0	
1993	Ralph Solhem	0	Chevy	RCH	STA	TMP	NHA; 20	NZH	STA	RIV	NHA	RPS; 7	HOL	LEE	RIV	STA	TMP	TMP	STA	TMP												39th	249	
1994	Ralph Solhem	0	Chevy	NHA; 33	STA; 19	TMP	NZH; 21	STA; 24	LEE; 6	TMP; 30	RIV	TIO	NHA	RPS; 5	HOL	TMP	RIV	NHA	STA	SPE	TMP	NHA; 38	STA	TMP								31st	852	
1995	Ralph Solhem	0	Chevy	TMP; 13	NHA; 4	STA; 26	NZH; 3	STA; 24	LEE; 10	TMP; 24	RIV; 28	BEE; 25	NHA; 18	JEN; 16	RPS; 14	HOL; 20	RIV; 13	NHA; 7	STA; 16	TMP; 15	NHA; 3	STA; 11	TMP; 26	TMP; 15								13th	2466	
1996	Ralph Solhem	0	Chevy	TMP; 20	**STA**; 5	**NZH**; 4	STA; 17	NHA; 27	JEN; 8	RIV; 9	LEE; 12	RPS; 8	HOL; 14	TMP; 11	RIV; 17	NHA; 18	GLN	STA; 14	NHA; 30	NHA; 19	STA; 33	FLE; 8	TMP; 9									17th	2277	
1997	Ralph Solhem	0	Chevy	TMP; 25	MAR; 27	STA; 12	NZH; 4	STA; 19	NHA; 38	FLE; 8	JEN; 6	RIV	GLN; 31	NHA; 32	RPS; 4	HOL; 22	TMP; 16	RIV; 9	NHA; 16	GLN; 23	STA; 23	NHA; 2	STA; 25	FLE; 33	TMP	RCH; 30						19th	2316	
1998	Ralph Solhem	0	Chevy	RPS	TMP; 29	MAR; 12	STA; 31	NZH; 10	STA; 5	GLN; 15	JEN; 11	RIV	NHA; 14	NHA; 5	LEE; 10	HOL; 16	TMP; 26	NHA; 26	RIV; 12	STA; 30	NHA; 10	TMP; 29	STA; 13	TMP; 30	FLE							14th	2213	
1999	Ralph Solhem	0	Chevy	TMP; 16	RPS; 23	STA; 20	RCH; 28	STA	RIV	JEN	NHA; 12	NZH; 35	HOL	TMP	NHA; 18	RIV	GLN; 17	STA	RPS; 26	TMP	NHA; 32		MAR; 5	TMP; DNQ								26th	1196	
1999	Bear Motorsports	14	Chevy																			STA; 39										26th	1196	
2000	Ralph Solhem	0	Chevy	STA; 16	RCH; 12	STA; 21	RIV; 23	SEE; 23	NHA; 35	NZH; 36		RIV; DNQ	GLN; 9	TMP; 14	STA; 30	WFD; 5	NHA; 22	STA; 17	MAR; 7	TMP; 28												17th	1689	
2000	Ralph Solhem	15	Chevy								TMP; 32																					17th	1689	
2001	Ralph Solhem	0	Chevy	SBO	TMP	STA	WFD	NZH; 10	STA	RIV	SEE	RCH	NHA; DNQ	HOL	RIV	CHE	TMP	STA	WFD	TMP	STA; DNQ	MAR	TMP									63rd	217	

=== ARCA Racing Series ===
(key) (Bold – Pole position awarded by qualifying time. Italics – Pole position earned by points standings or practice time. * – Most laps led.)

ARCA Racing Series results
Year	Team	No.	Make	1	2	3	4	5	6	7	8	9	10	11	12	13	14	15	16	17	18	19	20	21	22	23	24	25	ARSC	Pts	Ref
1997	E. B. Morris	27	Chevy	DAY; DNQ	ATL	SLM	CLT	CLT	POC	MCH	SBS	TOL	KIL	FRS	MIN	POC	MCH	DSF	GTW	SLM	WIN	CLT	TAL	ISF	ATL; DNQ				N/A	0	
1999	Ralph Solhem Racing	00	Chevy	DAY; 18	ATL	SLM	AND	CLT	MCH	POC	TOL	SBS	BLN	POC	KIL	FRS	FLM	ISF	WIN	DSF	SLM	CLT	TAL; 27	ATL					80th	235	
2000	Ralph Solhem Racing	00	Chevy	DAY; 34	SLM	AND	CLT	KIL	FRS	MCH	POC	TOL	KEN	BLN	POC	WIN	ISF	KEN	DSF	SLM	CLT	TAL	ATL						137th	60	
2001	Ralph Solhem Racing	00	Chevy	DAY; 33	NSH	WIN	SLM	GTY	KEN	CLT	KAN	MCH	POC	MEM	GLN	KEN	MCH	POC	NSH	ISF	CHI	DSF	SLM	TOL	BLN	CLT	TAL	ATL	174th	65	
2003	Ralph Solhem Racing	00	Pontiac	DAY; 36	ATL	NSH	SLM	TOL	KEN	CLT	BLN	KAN	MCH	LER	POC	POC	NSH	ISF	WIN	DSF	CHI	SLM	TAL	CLT	SBO				187th	50	
2004	Ralph Solhem Racing	00	Pontiac	DAY; 23	NSH	SLM	KEN	TOL	CLT	KAN	POC	MCH	SBO	BLN	KEN	GTW	POC	LER	NSH	ISF	TOL	DSF	CHI	SLM	TAL; 33				121st	180	
2005	Ralph Solhem Racing	00	Pontiac	DAY; 31	NSH	SLM	KEN	TOL	LAN	MIL	POC	MCH	KAN	KEN	BLN	POC	GTW	LER	NSH	MCH	ISF	TOL	DSF	CHI	SLM				150th	100	
2005	Ralph Solhem Racing	01	Chevy																							TAL; DNQ			150th	100	
2006	Ralph Solhem Racing	00	Chevy	DAY; DNQ	NSH	SLM	WIN	KEN	TOL	POC	MCH	KAN	KEN	BLN	POC	GTW	NSH	MCH	ISF	MIL	TOL	DSF	CHI	SLM	TAL	IOW			N/A	0	
2007	Ralph Solhem Racing	00	Chevy	DAY; DNQ	USA	NSH	SLM	KAN	WIN	KEN	TOL	IOW	POC	MCH	BLN	KEN	POC	NSH	ISF	MIL	GTW	DSF	CHI	SLM	TAL; DNQ	TOL			N/A	0	
2008	Ralph Solhem Racing	00	Chevy	DAY; 42	SLM	IOW	KAN	CAR	KEN	TOL	POC	MCH	CAY	KEN	BLN	POC	NSH	ISF	DSF	CHI	SLM	NJE	TAL	TOL					160th	30	
2009	Ralph Solhem Racing	00	Chevy	DAY; 6	SLM	CAR	TAL; 39	KEN	TOL	POC	MCH	MFD	IOW	KEN	BLN	POC	ISF	CHI	TOL	DSF	NJE	SLM	KAN	CAR					92nd	235	
2011	Ralph Solhem Racing	00	Chevy	DAY; 19	TAL	SLM	TOL	NJE	CHI	POC	MCH	WIN	BLN	IOW	IRP	POC	ISF	MAD	DSF	SLM	KAN	TOL							126th	135	
2012	Ralph Solhem Racing	00	Chevy	DAY; 24	MOB	SLM	TAL	TOL	ELK	POC	MCH	WIN	NJE	IOW	CHI	IRP	POC	BLN	ISF	MAD	SLM	DSF	KAN						120th	110	
