= Dan Shaver =

American racing driver

- Born: Daniel Shaver; June 6, 1950 Charlotte, North Carolina, U.S.
- Died: January 2, 2007 (aged 56) Charlotte, North Carolina, U.S.

ARCA Re/Max Series career
- Debut season: 2002
- Former teams: Shaver Motorsports
- Starts: 17
- Wins: 0
- Poles: 0
- Best finish: 51st in 2002
- Finished last season: 113th (2006)

NASCAR O'Reilly Auto Parts Series career
- 2 races run over 1 year
- Best finish: 101st (2002)
- First race: 2002 Tropicana Twister 300 (Chicagoland)
- Last race: 2002 Cabela's 250 (Michigan)
Wins	Top tens	Poles
0	0	0
- Statistics up to date as of May 26, 2020.

Daniel Shaver (June 6, 1950 – January 2, 2007) was an American professional stock car racing driver. He drove in two NASCAR Busch Series races in 2002, and was a frequent driver in both ARCA and the Sports Car Club of America (SCCA).

== Racing career ==
Shaver began racing in 1992, and when he did so, he founded his own team, Shaver Motorsports. He competed in ARCA, SCCA, and the NASCAR Busch Series, usually driving the No. 49 car and owning the No. 2 ride in ARCA. In 2006, Shaver retired from driving but continued to be an owner in ARCA, where he partnered with Joe Gibbs Racing to field their developmental drivers Denny Hamlin and Aric Almirola. Todd Bodine and Justin Marks were other notable drivers who drove for Shaver's ARCA team.

== Personal life and death ==
Shaver graduated from South Mecklenburg High School, attended Central Piedmont Community College, and served in the United States Army Reserve.

In 1979, Shaver started a wholesale petroleum distribution company called Carolina Petroleum Distributors and also served as its CEO. The company grew from a statewide to a regional distributor. Shaver also owned a chain of convenience stores called Petro Express, which was his sponsor in nearly all of his NASCAR and ARCA starts.

Shaver died of cancer on January 2, 2007, at the age of 56.

== Motorsports career results ==
=== NASCAR ===
(key) (Bold – Pole position awarded by qualifying time. Italics – Pole position earned by points standings or practice time. * – Most laps led.)

==== Busch Series ====
NASCAR Busch Series results
Year	Team	No.	Make	1	2	3	4	5	6	7	8	9	10	11	12	13	14	15	16	17	18	19	20	21	22	23	24	25	26	27	28	29	30	31	32	33	34	NBSC	Pts	Ref
2002	Jay Robinson Racing	49	Chevy	DAY	CAR	LVS	DAR	BRI	TEX	NSH	TAL	CAL	RCH	NHA	NZH	CLT	DOV	NSH	KEN	MLW	DAY	CHI; 35	GTY	PPR	IRP	MCH; 43	BRI	DAR	RCH	DOV	KAN	CLT	MEM	ATL	CAR	PHO	HOM	101st	92	

==== Goody's Dash Series ====
NASCAR Goody's Dash Series results
Year	Team	No.	Make	1	2	3	4	5	6	7	8	9	10	11	12	13	14	15	16	17	18	NGDS	Pts	Ref
2000	N/A	49	Pontiac	DAY; 41	MON	STA	JAC	CAR	CLT; 26	SBO	ROU	LOU	SUM	GRE	SNM	MYB	BRI	HCY	JAC	USA	LAN	64th	125	
2001	N/A	49	Pontiac	DAY; DNQ	ROU	DAR	CLT; 31	LOU	JAC	KEN	SBO	DAY; 14	GRE	SNM	NRV	MYB	BRI	ACE	JAC	USA	NSH	56th	222	
2002	N/A	49	Pontiac	DAY; 41	HAR	ROU	LON	CLT; 30	KEN	MEM	GRE	SNM	SBO	MYB	BRI	MOT	ATL					65th	113	

=== ARCA Re/Max Series ===
(key) (Bold – Pole position awarded by qualifying time. Italics – Pole position earned by points standings or practice time. * – Most laps led.)

ARCA Re/Max Series results
Year	Team	No.	Make	1	2	3	4	5	6	7	8	9	10	11	12	13	14	15	16	17	18	19	20	21	22	23	ARMC	Pts	Ref
2002	Shaver Motorsports	49	Pontiac	DAY; 20	ATL; DNQ	NSH	SLM	KEN	CLT; 21	KAN; 28	POC; DNS	MCH; 9	TOL	SBO	KEN	BLN	POC	NSH	ISF	WIN	DSF	CHI	SLM	TAL	CLT		51st	555	
2003	Shaver Motorsports	49	Pontiac	DAY; 30	ATL; 41	NSH	SLM	TOL	KEN; 18	CLT; DNS	BLN	KAN	MCH; 30	LER	POC	POC	NSH	ISF; 29	WIN	DSF	CHI; DNS	SLM	TAL; 39	CLT; 26	SBO		53rd	600	
2004	Shaver Motorsports	49	Pontiac	DAY; 34	NSH	SLM	KEN	TOL	CLT; 17	KAN	POC	MCH; DNQ	SBO	BLN	KEN	GTW	POC	LER	NSH	ISF	TOL	DSF	CHI	SLM			79th	320	
2004	Shaver Motorsports	4	Chevy																						TAL; 28		79th	320	
2005	Shaver Motorsports	49	Chevy	DAY; 19	NSH	SLM	KEN	TOL	LAN	MIL	POC	MCH	KAN	KEN	BLN	POC	GTW	LER	NSH	MCH							93rd	280	
2005	Shaver Motorsports	2	Pontiac																		ISF; 17	TOL	DSF	CHI	SLM	TAL	93rd	280	
2006	Shaver Motorsports	2	Chevy	DAY; 12	NSH	SLM	WIN	KEN	TOL	POC	MCH	KAN	KEN	BLN	POC	GTW	NSH	MCH	ISF	MIL	TOL	DSF	CHI	SLM	TAL	IOW	113th	170	
