= Matt Hagans =

American racing driver

- Born: June 30, 1956 (age 70); Brownsburg, Indiana, U.S.

ARCA Menards Series career
- 24 races run over 6 years
- Best finish: 30th (2003)
- First race: 2002 Kentuckiana Ford Dealers 200 (Salem)
- Last race: 2007 Buckle-Up Kentucky 150 (Kentucky)
Wins	Top tens	Poles
0	9	0
- Statistics up to date as of March 20, 2024.

Matt Hagans (born June 30, 1956) is an American former professional stock car racing driver who has previously competed in the ARCA RE/MAX Series.

== Racing career ==
Between 1997 and 2001, Hagans competed in various series such as the ASA National Tour, both the NASCAR Southeast Series and Southwest Series, the Florida Pro Series, and the Sunoco Super Series, where he achieved a fifth-place points finish in his rookie year in 1997.

In 2002, Hagans made his debut in the ARCA RE/MAX Series at Salem Speedway, driving the No. 16 Pontiac for Braun Racing, where he started third and finished in fifth place. He then made another start with the team at Michigan International Speedway, this time driving the No. 78 Dodge, where he started in thirteenth and finished in sixth. He also attempted to qualify for the race at Winchester Speedway, driving the No. 75 Pontiac for Bob Schacht Motorsports, but ultimately failed to qualify. After making three more starts the following year with Braun, getting a best finish of third at Kentucky Speedway, Hagans went on to form his own team, Hagans Racing, where he made four starts, and would get a best result of fourth in the teams debut at Michigan. Hagans then made four starts in 2004, getting a runner up finish at Michigan, where he started third and finished second behind race winner Reed Sorenson.

In 2005, Hagans signed Joey Miller to drive the No. 9 full-time, and Miller would finish runner-up in the standings behind Frank Kimmel and won the rookie of the year honors. Hagans finished fifth at Daytona International Speedway before attempting several races for Dave Allison in the No. 64 Dodge; he only qualified for the second Michigan race, where he finished 39th due to engine issues. Afterwards, Hagans went back to his own team in the No. 9 Dodge, making five starts and getting a best finish of third at Daytona. He then attempted two races the following year, finishing seventh at Kentucky Speedway and failing to qualify for the first Michigan race. The Kentucky event is his most recent event as a driver, as he has not raced in the series since then.

== Motorsports results ==
=== ARCA RE/MAX Series ===
(key) (Bold – Pole position awarded by qualifying time. Italics – Pole position earned by points standings or practice time. * – Most laps led.)

ARCA RE/MAX Series results
Year	Team	No.	Make	1	2	3	4	5	6	7	8	9	10	11	12	13	14	15	16	17	18	19	20	21	22	23	ARMC	Pts	Ref
2002	Braun Racing	16	Pontiac	DAY	ATL	NSH	SLM; 5	KEN	CLT	KAN	POC																69th	435	
2002	Braun Racing	78	Dodge									MCH; 6	TOL	SBO	KEN	BLN	POC	NSH	ISF								69th	435	
2002	Bob Schacht Motorsports	75	Pontiac																	WIN; DNQ	DSF	CHI	SLM	TAL	CLT		69th	435	
2003	Braun Racing	77	Pontiac	DAY; 40	ATL	NSH																					30th	895	
2003	Braun Racing	77	Dodge				SLM; 24	TOL	KEN; 3	CLT	BLN	KAN															30th	895	
2003	Hagans Racing	9	Dodge										MCH; 4	LER	POC	POC	NSH	ISF	WIN	DSF	CHI; 38	SLM; 10					30th	895	
2003	Hagans Racing	9	Pontiac																				TAL; 25	CLT	SBO		30th	895	
2004	Hagans Racing	9	Dodge	DAY	NSH	SLM; 27	KEN; 31	TOL	CLT	KAN	POC	MCH; 2	SBO	BLN	KEN; 38	GTW	POC	LER	NSH	ISF	TOL	DSF	CHI	SLM	TAL		63rd	450	
2005	Hagans Racing	64	Dodge	DAY; 5																						TAL; Wth	64th	495	
2005	Dave Allison Motorsports	64	Dodge		NSH; Wth	SLM	KEN; Wth	TOL	LAN	MIL	POC	MCH; DNQ	KAN; Wth	KEN	BLN	POC; DNQ	GTW	LER	NSH; DNQ	MCH; 39	ISF	TOL	DSF	CHI; DNQ	SLM		64th	495	
2006	Hagans Racing	9	Dodge	DAY; 3	NSH	SLM	WIN; 26	KEN	TOL	POC	MCH	KAN	KEN; 26	BLN	POC	GTW	NSH	MCH	ISF; 21	MIL	TOL	DSF	CHI	SLM	TAL; 11	IOW	53rd	735	
2007	Hagans Racing	9	Dodge	DAY	USA	NSH	SLM	KAN	WIN	KEN; 7	TOL	IOW	POC	MCH; DNQ	BLN	KEN	POC	NSH	ISF	MIL	GTW	DSF	CHI	SLM	TAL	TOL	101st	220	
