= Andy Belmont =

American racing driver and team owner

- Born: Charles Andrew Belmont Jr. November 20, 1957 (age 68); Langhorne, Pennsylvania, U.S.

NASCAR Cup Series career
- 12 races run over 4 years
- Best finish: 43rd (1992)
- First race: 1989 Peak Performance 500 (Dover)
- Last race: 2004 Carolina Dodge Dealers 400 (Darlington)
Wins	Top tens	Poles
0	0	0

NASCAR O'Reilly Auto Parts Series career
- 5 races run over 3 years
- Best finish: 68th (1995)
- First race: 1992 Gatorade 200 (Darlington)
- Last race: 2003 O'Reilly 300 (Texas)
Wins	Top tens	Poles
0	0	0
- Statistics up to date as of March 14, 2010.

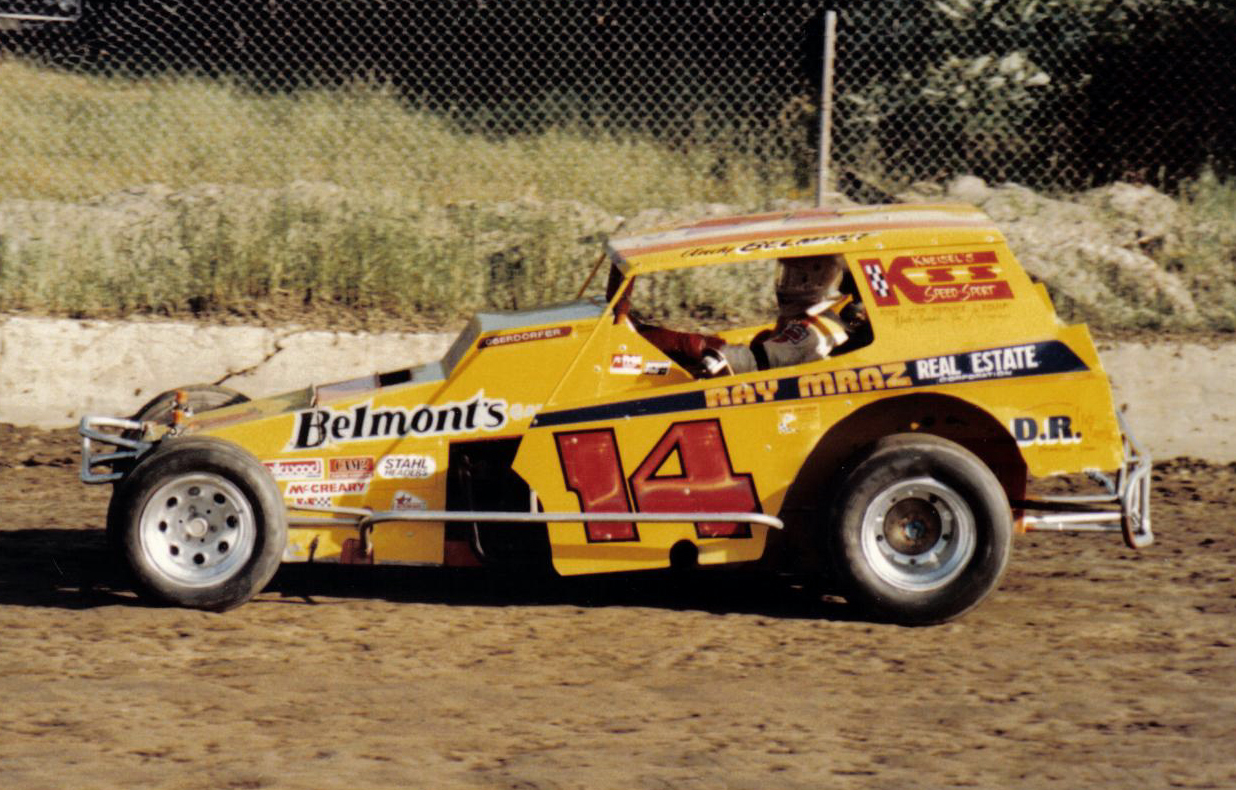
Early 1980s dirt Modified car

Charles Andrew Belmont Jr. (born November 20, 1957) is an American former stock car driver and team owner. Belmont began racing at an early age before moving south. In 1987, he was named the NASCAR Dash Series Rookie of the Year, then he won the championship the next year as a car owner. Belmont posted three wins in the DASH Series at Hickory Motor Speedway on October 18, 1987, Myrtle Beach Speedway on May 20, 1988, and Southside Speedway on July 8, 1988.

== Career overview ==
In 1989, Belmont made his Winston Cup debut at Dover Downs International Speedway (now Dover International) Peak Performance 500, starting 35th and finishing 29th after his No. 04 Winner Ford Cherry Hill Ford Thunderbird suffered braking failure. In 1992, he finished runner-up for Winston Cup Rookie of the Year despite running just eight races. His best NASCAR finish came in a Busch Series race in 1995 at Darlington Raceway.

Running in only five ARCA events in 1995, Belmont earned three top-five finishes. Three years later, he became a regular competitor on the circuit, finishing the 1998 campaign in fifth place in the final point standings. He backed that up with a sixth place finish in 1999. The following season resulted in another top-ten finish in the final point standings.

Belmont finished in the top ten in ARCA points four years in a row.

Belmont ran 174 races in the ARCA Re/MAX Series. He did not win a race, but earned 54 top-ten finishes.

In 2006, Belmont attempted Cup racing again, entering a car in the Daytona 500 sponsored by Year One Muscle Cars and Fanscrew.com.

== Ownership role ==
Belmont stepped out of the driver's seat and into an ownership role. His team, Andy Belmont Racing, was based in Lexington, NC, and ran two cars weekly in the ARCA Racing Series presented by Re/Max and Menards. Chad McCumbee last drove the No. 1 for ABR in 2011, winning the Bill France Four Crown tile with sponsorship from ModSpace. McCumbee had previously won races for ABR. In 2007, McCumbee won two races in five starts for ABR, at the Nashville Superspeedway and Pocono Raceway. McCumbee was the winner of the 2011 Allen Crowe 100 at Springfield in 2011.

Mikey Kile was ABR's last driver of its ARCA entries in 2012.

== Personal life ==
Belmont has five children and sold the race team moving back to the Philadelphia area in 2012 to help run a family business. Two of the three boys work with Belmont to run the business on a daily basis.

== Motorsports career results ==
=== NASCAR ===
(key) (Bold – Pole position awarded by qualifying time. Italics – Pole position earned by points standings or practice time. * – Most laps led.)

==== Nextel Cup Series ====
NASCAR Nextel Cup Series results
Year	Team	No.	Make	1	2	3	4	5	6	7	8	9	10	11	12	13	14	15	16	17	18	19	20	21	22	23	24	25	26	27	28	29	30	31	32	33	34	35	36	NNCC	Pts	Ref
1989	George Hakes Racing	04	Ford	DAY	CAR	ATL	RCH	DAR	BRI	NWS	MAR	TAL	CLT	DOV	SON	POC	MCH	DAY	POC	TAL	GLN	MCH	BRI	DAR	RCH	DOV; 29	MAR	CLT	NWS	CAR	PHO	ATL								86th	76	
1991	Pat Rissi Racing	59	Ford	DAY	RCH	CAR	ATL	DAR	BRI	NWS	MAR	TAL	CLT	DOV	SON	POC	MCH	DAY	POC	TAL	GLN	MCH	BRI	DAR	RCH	DOV; 40	MAR	NWS	CLT	CAR	PHO	ATL								89th	43	
1992	Pat Rissi Racing	59	Ford	DAY; DNQ	CAR; 38	RCH; DNQ	ATL	DAR	BRI	NWS	MAR	TAL	CLT	DOV; 37	SON	POC; 40	MCH; 34	DAY; 31	POC; 28	TAL; 39	GLN	MCH; DNQ	BRI	DAR; 32	RCH	DOV	MAR	NWS	CLT	CAR	PHO	ATL								43rd	467	
1993	Andy Belmont Racing	79	Ford	DAY	CAR	RCH	ATL	DAR	BRI	NWS	MAR	TAL	SON	CLT	DOV	POC	MCH	DAY; DNQ	NHA	POC	TAL	GLN	MCH	BRI	DAR	RCH	DOV	MAR	NWS	CLT	CAR	PHO	ATL							NA	-	
1994	Andy Belmont Racing	59	Ford	DAY	CAR	RCH	ATL	DAR; DNQ	BRI	NWS	MAR	TAL	SON	CLT	DOV; DNQ	POC; DNQ	MCH	DAY	NHA	POC	TAL	IND; DNQ	GLN	MCH; DNQ	BRI	DAR	RCH	DOV	MAR	NWS	CLT	CAR	PHO	ATL						NA	-	
1999	T.R.I.X. Racing	79	Ford	DAY	CAR	LVS	ATL	DAR	TEX	BRI	MAR	TAL	CAL	RCH	CLT	DOV	MCH	POC	SON	DAY	NHA	POC	IND	GLN	MCH	BRI	DAR	RCH	NHA; DNQ	DOV; DNQ	MAR	CLT	TAL	CAR	PHO					NA	-	
1999	Meacham Racing	04	Ford																																	HOM; DNQ	ATL			NA	-	
2004	Andy Belmont Racing	59	Pontiac	DAY	CAR; Wth	LVS																																		76th	98	
2004	SCORE Motorsports	02	Pontiac				ATL; 39	DAR; 37	BRI	TEX; DNQ	MAR	TAL	CAL	RCH	CLT	DOV	POC	MCH	SON	DAY	CHI	NHA	POC	IND	GLN	MCH	BRI	CAL	RCH	NHA	DOV	TAL	KAN	CLT	MAR					76th	98	
2004	Hover Motorsports	80	Ford																																	ATL; DNQ	PHO	DAR	HOM	76th	98	
2005	Hover Motorsports	80	Ford	DAY; DNQ	CAL	LVS	ATL	BRI	MAR	TEX	PHO	TAL	DAR	RCH	CLT	DOV	POC	MCH	SON	DAY	CHI	NHA	POC	IND	GLN	MCH	BRI	CAL	RCH	NHA	DOV	TAL	KAN	CLT	MAR	ATL	TEX	PHO	HOM	NA	-	
2006	Andy Belmont Racing	59	Chevy	DAY; DNQ	CAL	LVS	ATL	BRI	MAR	TEX	PHO	TAL	RCH	DAR	CLT	DOV	POC	MCH	SON	DAY	CHI	NHA	POC	IND	GLN	MCH	BRI	CAL	RCH	NHA	DOV	KAN	TAL	CLT	MAR	ATL	TEX	PHO	HOM	NA	-	

===== Daytona 500 =====
Year	Team	Manufacturer	Start	Finish
1992	Pat Rissi Racing	Ford	DNQ	
2005	Hover Motorsports	Ford	DNQ	
2006	Andy Belmont Racing	Chevrolet	DNQ	

==== Busch Series ====
NASCAR Busch Series results
Year	Team	No.	Make	1	2	3	4	5	6	7	8	9	10	11	12	13	14	15	16	17	18	19	20	21	22	23	24	25	26	27	28	29	30	31	32	33	34	NBSC	Pts	Ref
1992	Owen Racing	9	Olds	DAY	CAR	RCH	ATL	MAR	DAR	BRI	HCY	LAN	DUB	NZH	CLT	DOV	ROU	MYB	GLN	VOL	NHA	TAL	IRP	ROU	MCH	NHA	BRI	DAR; 29	RCH	DOV	CLT	MAR	CAR	HCY				122nd	76	
1995	Colburn Racing	46	Chevy	DAY	CAR	RCH	ATL	NSV	DAR; 39	BRI; DNQ	HCY	NHA	NZH	CLT	DOV	MYB	GLN	MLW																				68th	231	
1995	Colburn Racing	36	Chevy																TAL; DNQ	SBO	IRP	MCH	BRI; DNQ	DAR; 21	RCH	DOV; 26	CLT; DNQ	CAR; DNQ	HOM; DNQ									68th	231	
1996	Colburn Racing	36	Chevy	DAY; DNQ	CAR	RCH	ATL	NSV	DAR	BRI	HCY	NZH	CLT	DOV	SBO	MYB	GLN	MLW	NHA	TAL	IRP	MCH	BRI	DAR	RCH	DOV	CLT	CAR	HOM									NA	-	
2003	Red Racing	91	Pontiac	DAY	CAR	LVS	DAR	BRI	TEX; 42	TAL	NSH	CAL	RCH	GTY	NZH	CLT	DOV	NSH	KEN	MLW	DAY	CHI	NHA	PPR	IRP	MCH	BRI	DAR	RCH	DOV	KAN	CLT	MEM	ATL	PHO	CAR	HOM	151st	37th	

==== Craftsman Truck Series ====
NASCAR Craftsman Truck Series results
Year	Team	No.	Make	1	2	3	4	5	6	7	8	9	10	11	12	13	14	15	16	17	18	19	20	21	22	23	24	25	26	NCTC	Pts	Ref
1997	MB Motorsports	26	Ford	WDW; DNQ	TUS; DNQ	HOM	PHO; DNQ	POR	EVG	I70	NHA	TEX	BRI	NZH	MLW	LVL	CNS	HPT	IRP	FLM	NSV	GLN	RCH	MAR	SON	MMR	CAL	PHO	LVS	NA	-	

=== ARCA Re/Max Series ===
(key) (Bold – Pole position awarded by qualifying time. Italics – Pole position earned by points standings or practice time. * – Most laps led.)

ARCA Re/Max Series results
Year	Team	No.	Make	1	2	3	4	5	6	7	8	9	10	11	12	13	14	15	16	17	18	19	20	21	22	23	24	25	ARMC	Pts	Ref
1994	Andy Belmont Racing	95	Ford	DAY	TAL	FIF	LVL	KIL	TOL	FRS	MCH; 4	DMS	POC	POC; 37	KIL	FRS	INF	I70	ISF	DSF	TOL	SLM	WIN						64th	710	
1994		91	Ford																					ATL; 5					64th	710	
1995	Andy Belmont Racing	5	Ford	DAY; 24	ATL; 10	TAL; 36	FIF	KIL	FRS	MCH; 26	I80	MCS	FRS	POC	POC	KIL	FRS	SBS	LVL	ISF	DSF	SLM	WIN	ATL					57th	-	
1997	Peterson Motorsports	06	Pontiac	DAY; DNQ	ATL	SLM	CLT	CLT																					93rd	-	
1997	Blaise Alexander Racing	2	Chevy						POC; 24	MCH	SBS	TOL	KIL	FRS	MIN	POC; 29	MCH	DSF	GTW	SLM	WIN	CLT	TAL	ISF	ATL				93rd	-	
1998	Andy Belmont Racing	40	Chevy	DAY; 12																									5th	4690	
1998	Andy Belmont Racing	40	Ford		ATL; 2	SLM; 27	CLT; 8	MEM; 10	MCH; 32	POC; 27	SBS; 14	TOL; 11	PPR; 14	POC; 17	KIL; 5	FRS; 20	ISF; 37	ATL; 18	DSF; 7	SLM; 28	TEX; 9	WIN; 2	CLT; 16	TAL; 11	ATL; 13				5th	4690	
1999	Andy Belmont Racing	40	Ford	DAY; 24	ATL; 30	SLM; 7	AND; 22	CLT; 28	MCH; 11	POC; 12	TOL; 4	SBS; 16	BLN; 22	POC; 23	KIL; 17	FRS; 19	FLM; 17	ISF; 10	WIN; 4	DSF; 9	SLM; 6	CLT; 9	TAL; 12	ATL; 37					6th	4450	
2000	Andy Belmont Racing	50	Ford	DAY; 8	SLM; 25	AND; 15	CLT; 7	KIL; 6	FRS; 5	MCH; 24	POC; 18	TOL; 6	KEN; 13	BLN; 16	POC; 19	WIN; 26	ISF; 33	KEN; 18	DSF; 27	SLM; 25	CLT; 32	TAL; 8	ATL; 38						10th	3765	
2001	Andy Belmont Racing	1	Ford	DAY; 16	NSH; 9	WIN; 3	SLM; 13	GTY; 23	KEN; 8	CLT; 9	KAN; 5	MCH; 5	POC; 10	MEM; 19	GLN; 10	KEN; 15	MCH; 14	POC; 12	NSH; 30	ISF; 6	CHI; 10	DSF; 7	SLM; 5	TOL; 2	BLN; 23	CLT; 11	TAL; 35	ATL; 26	3rd	5470	
2002	Andy Belmont Racing	1	Ford	DAY; 36	ATL; 6	NSH; 31	SLM; 3	KEN; 5	CLT; 10	KAN; 5	POC; 7	MCH; 13	TOL; 29	SBO; 7	KEN; 26	BLN; 15	POC; 29	NSH; 26	ISF; 14	WIN; 19	DSF; 34	CHI; 25	SLM; 2*	TAL; 15	CLT; 13				7th	4520	
2003	Andy Belmont Racing	1	Pontiac	DAY; 29																									11th	4250	
2003	Andy Belmont Racing	1	Ford		ATL; 31	NSH; 32	SLM; 5	TOL; 4	KEN; 13	CLT; 8	BLN; 28	KAN; 24	MCH; 37	LER; 3	POC; 4	POC; 10	NSH; 14	ISF; 26	WIN; 18	DSF; 32	CHI; 28	SLM; 7		CLT; 24	SBO; 25				11th	4250	
2003	Andy Belmont Racing	1	Dodge																				TAL; 16						11th	4250	
2004	Andy Belmont Racing	1	Pontiac	DAY; 33	NSH																								22nd	1135	
2004	Andy Belmont Racing	4	Ford			SLM; 7	KEN; 35	TOL	CLT				SBO; 30	BLN	KEN	GTW													22nd	1135	
2004	Andy Belmont Racing	4	Pontiac							KAN; 36																			22nd	1135	
2004	Peterson Motorsports	6	Pontiac								POC; 25																		22nd	1135	
2004	Mark Gibson Racing	56	Ford									MCH; DNQ																	22nd	1135	
2004	Hixson Motorsports	2	Pontiac														POC; 11	LER	NSH										22nd	1135	
2004	Andy Belmont Racing	1	Ford																	ISF; 27	TOL; 26	DSF; 33	CHI	SLM; 31	TAL				22nd	1135	
2005	Andy Belmont Racing	1	Chevy	DAY; DNQ	NSH; 30		KEN; 29	TOL; 34																					13th	3910	
2005	Andy Belmont Racing	1	Ford			SLM; 15			LAN; 15	MIL; 23	POC; 33	MCH; 40	KAN; 9	KEN; 15	BLN; 30	POC; 18	GTW; 18	LER; 11	NSH; 17	MCH; 15	ISF; 18	TOL; 9	DSF; 27	CHI; 28	SLM; 18	TAL; 33			13th	3910	
2006	Andy Belmont Racing	1	Ford	DAY; 36	NSH; 32	SLM; 30	WIN; 27	KEN	TOL; 30	POC	MCH	KAN; 32	KEN; 34	BLN	POC	GTW	NSH; DNQ	MCH; DNQ	ISF; 22	MIL; 19	TOL	DSF; 28	CHI; DNQ	SLM	TAL	IOW			42nd	925	
2007	Andy Belmont Racing	1	Ford	DAY; DNQ	USA	NSH	SLM	KAN	WIN	KEN	TOL	IOW	POC	MCH	BLN	KEN	POC	NSH	ISF	MIL	GTW	DSF	CHI	SLM	TAL	TOL			185th	25	
