= John Hayden (racing driver) =

American racing driver

- Born: December 2, 1968 (age 57); Livermore, Kentucky, U.S.

NASCAR O'Reilly Auto Parts Series career
- 16 races run over 5 years
- 2006 position: 152nd
- Best finish: 57th (2003)
- First race: 2002 Bashas' Supermarket 200 (Phoenix)
- Last race: 2006 AT&T 250 (Milwaukee)
Wins	Top tens	Poles
0	0	0
- Statistics up to date as of December 3, 2022.

John Hayden (born December 2, 1968) is an American former professional stock car racing driver who competed in both the NASCAR Busch Series and the ARCA Re/Max Series from 2000 to 2006.

== Racing career ==
Hayden first ran in the NASCAR Southeast Series in 1997, and would run one more race in the next six years.

In 2001, Hayden would make his ARCA Re/Max Series debut at Memphis Motorsports Park driving for Dan Kinney, where he would finish 25th after starting 14th. He would make three more starts that year and would get a best finish of fifth at the Illinois State Fairgrounds. He would make six more starts the following year, earning a best career finish of third in the first start of the year at Nashville Superspeedway. It was also during this year where Hayden would make his first NASCAR Busch Series debut at Phoenix International Raceway after failing to qualify at Lowe's Motor Speedway and Memphis.

In 2003, Hayden would run in a number of the Busch Series season with Kinney's team, Premier Motorsports, in the No. 85 Chevrolet, entering in seventeen races and qualifying for ten with a best finish of 18th at Nashville and Indianapolis Raceway Park. Hayden and Kinney would part ways at the end of the year.

Hayden would join Day Enterprises Racing in 2004, first driving the No. 61 Chevrolet at Nashville, finishing 32nd, and then driving the No. 16 for six races, only qualifying at Pikes Peak International Raceway and Memphis. After failing to qualify for five races at the beginning of the following year in 2005, he would return to Premier Motorsports at Pikes Peak, where he would finish 38th after starting in 22nd due to a brake issue. He would make one more Busch Series start the following year, running at the Milwaukee Mile, finishing 32nd due to a crash. It was during this time that he served as a crew member for Brewco Motorsports.

Hayden would go on to serve as a crew chief for Patrick Sheltra in the ARCA Re/Max Series in 2009, with his last start in auto racing coming at a CRA Street Stocks Series event at Kentucky Motor Speedway, where he would finish ninth.

== Personal life ==
Hayden is currently the co-track operator of Kentucky Motor Speedway in Whitesville, Kentucky.

== Motorsports career results ==
=== NASCAR ===
(key) (Bold – Pole position awarded by qualifying time. Italics – Pole position earned by points standings or practice time. * – Most laps led.)

==== Busch Series ====
NASCAR Busch Series results
Year	Team	No.	Make	1	2	3	4	5	6	7	8	9	10	11	12	13	14	15	16	17	18	19	20	21	22	23	24	25	26	27	28	29	30	31	32	33	34	35	NBSC	Pts	Ref
2002	Premier Motorsports	85	Chevy	DAY	CAR	LVS	DAR	BRI	TEX	NSH	TAL	CAL	RCH	NHA	NZH	CLT	DOV	NSH	KEN	MLW	DAY	CHI	GTY	PPR	IRP	MCH	BRI	DAR	RCH	DOV	KAN	CLT; DNQ	MEM; DNQ	ATL	CAR	PHO; 33	HOM		113th	64	
2003	Premier Motorsports	85	Chevy	DAY	CAR	LVS	DAR	BRI; 21	TEX	TAL	NSH; DNQ	CAL	RCH	GTY; 24	NZH	CLT	DOV	NSH; 18	KEN; DNQ	MLW	DAY	CHI	NHA	PPR; 36	IRP; 18	MCH; 42	BRI; DNQ	DAR; 36	RCH; 43	DOV; 35	KAN; DNQ	CLT; 31	MEM; DNQ	ATL; DNQ	PHO; DNQ	CAR	HOM		57th	663	
2004	Day Enterprises Racing	61	Chevy	DAY	CAR	LVS	DAR	BRI	TEX	NSH	TAL	CAL	GTY	RCH	NZH	CLT	DOV	NSH; 32	KEN	MLW	DAY	CHI	NHA																89th	228	
2004	Day Enterprises Racing	16	Chevy																					PPR; 28	IRP; DNQ	MCH	BRI; DNQ	CAL	RCH	DOV	KAN; DNQ	CLT	MEM; 27	ATL; DNQ	PHO	DAR	HOM		89th	228	
2005	Day Enterprises Racing	16	Chevy	DAY	CAL; DNQ	MXC	LVS; DNQ	ATL; DNQ	NSH; DNQ	BRI; DNQ	TEX	PHO	TAL	DAR	RCH	CLT	DOV	NSH	KEN	MLW	DAY	CHI	NHA																138th	49	
2005	Premier Motorsports	85	Chevy																					PPR; 38	GTY; DNQ	IRP; DNQ	GLN	MCH	BRI; DNQ	CAL	RCH	DOV	KAN	CLT	MEM	TEX	PHO	HOM	138th	49	
2006	Premier Motorsports	85	Chevy	DAY	CAL	MXC	LVS	ATL	BRI	TEX	NSH	PHO	TAL	RCH	DAR	CLT	DOV	NSH; DNQ	KEN; DNQ	MLW; 32	DAY	CHI	NHA	MAR	GTY	IRP	GLN	MCH	BRI	CAL	RCH	DOV	KAN	CLT	MEM	TEX	PHO	HOM	152nd	0	

=== ARCA Re/Max Series ===
(key) (Bold – Pole position awarded by qualifying time. Italics – Pole position earned by points standings or practice time. * – Most laps led.)

ARCA Re/Max Series results
Year	Team	No.	Make	1	2	3	4	5	6	7	8	9	10	11	12	13	14	15	16	17	18	19	20	21	22	23	24	25	ARMC	Pts	Ref
2001	Premier Motorsports	85	Pontiac	DAY	NSH	WIN	SLM	GTY	KEN	CLT	KAN	MCH	POC	MEM; 25	GLN	KEN	MCH	POC	NSH	ISF; 5	CHI	DSF	SLM; 16	TOL; 16	BLN	CLT	TAL	ATL	56th	625	
2002	Premier Motorsports	85	Pontiac	DAY	ATL	NSH; 3	SLM; 29	KEN; 35	CLT; 34	KAN	POC	MCH	TOL; 17	SBO	KEN; 38	BLN	POC	NSH	ISF	WIN	DSF	CHI	SLM	TAL	CLT				46th	600	
2004	Cain Langford	58	Pontiac	DAY	NSH	SLM	KEN	TOL	CLT	KAN	POC	MCH	SBO	BLN	KEN	GTW	POC	LER	NSH	ISF	TOL	DSF	CHI	SLM; 27	TAL				158th	100	
2005	Nick Evans	61	Ford	DAY	NSH	SLM	KEN	TOL	LAN	MIL	POC	MCH	KAN	KEN; DNQ	BLN	POC	GTW	LER	NSH	MCH	ISF	TOL; DNQ	DSF; Wth	CHI	SLM; 28	TAL			129th	140	
