= Ryan Hemphill =

American racing driver (born 1981)

- Born: December 30, 1981 (age 44); Apollo, Pennsylvania, U.S.

NASCAR O'Reilly Auto Parts Series career
- 11 races run over 1 year
- Best finish: 54th (2005)
- First race: 2005 Hershey's Take 5 300 (Daytona)
- Last race: 2005 SBC 250 (Milwaukee)
Wins	Top tens	Poles
0	0	0

NASCAR FedEx Freight Truck Series career
- 9 races run over 2 years
- Best finish: 35th (2002)
- First race: 2002 O'Reilly Auto Parts 200 (Memphis)
- Last race: 2003 Virginia Is For Lovers 200 (Richmond)
Wins	Top tens	Poles
0	1	0

Ryan Hemphill (born December 30, 1981) is an American former NASCAR driver from Apollo, Pennsylvania.

== Racing career ==
Hemphill, a second generation racer, started his racing career at the age of 12, when his father put him behind the wheel of a go-kart. He went on to race in go-carts both locally and nationally for a period of three years. During this span, Hemphill collected approximately 50 wins.

At the age of 15, Hemphill advanced to Legacy cars (three-quarter scale Nextel Cup cars), where he competed for two years and amassed five wins and three poles including winning the Blue-Grey Shootout at the Jennerstown Speedway(PA) and the Fireball Roberts Memorial at the famed Hickory Motor Speedway (NC).

In 1999, while a senior at Kiski Area High School (PA), Hemphill moved into Late Model competition locally at the Motordrome (PA) and Jennerstown (PA) Speedways. In impressive fashion Hemphill won the Rookie of the Year Award at both of these tracks. At the Motordrome Speedway, Hemphill garnered 20 top-ten finishes in 20 starts while finishing second in the tight points battle, while at Jennerstown he finished a strong sixth in points.

The 2000 season saw Hemphill continue his maturation as a race car driver. He continued his participation at the Motordrome Speedway as he finished third in the overall points and collected three wins, 17 top-five and ten top-ten finishes. Hemphillalso stepped up with his participation in two American Speed Association (ASA) events where he finished 12th in both. The year was capped off with his high school graduation and being named Auto Racing Club of Hagerstown (MD) Sportsman of the Year.

In 2001, Hemphill concentrated on gaining as much experience behind the wheel of a race car as possible. He limited his Motordrome Speedway schedule to 11 events where he won five times and earned ten top-five finishes. He expanded his ASA schedule and competed in six events with a season best sixth-place finish at the Chicago Motor Speedway. Hemphill also moved up to the NASCAR All-Pro Series and impressed many with his third-place finish at Memphis Motorsports Park in his first race as well as a fourth-place finish in his ARCA Re/Max Series debut at the Milwaukee Mile. He was also selected as a member of the GM Vortec Power Team Professionals.

Hemphill made himself known in 2002 and 2003 driving in the NASCAR Craftsman Truck Series for multiple owners, including Rick Ware, Bobby Hamilton, and Billy Ballew. In nine races, he scored one top ten.

Hemphill broke out in the 2004 ARCA season, scoring six wins and ten top-tens in eleven races, under the Chip Ganassi Racing driver development program. In 2005, Hemphill was promoted to the NASCAR Busch Series in the Biagi Brothers Racing Ganassi-assisted program, driving the No. 4 GEICO Dodge Charger. However, after eleven races, with only mediocre results, Hemphill was released from the car and from his Chip Ganassi Racing driver development program and finished last in the 2005 NASCAR Busch Series Rookie of the Year standings.

== Motorsports career results ==
=== NASCAR ===
(key) (Bold - Pole position awarded by qualifying time. Italics - Pole position earned by points standings or practice time. * – Most laps led.)

==== Busch Series ====
NASCAR Busch Series results
Year	Team	No.	Make	1	2	3	4	5	6	7	8	9	10	11	12	13	14	15	16	17	18	19	20	21	22	23	24	25	26	27	28	29	30	31	32	33	34	35	NBSC	Pts	Ref
2005	Biagi Brothers Racing	4	Dodge	DAY; 36	CAL; 27	MXC; 17	LVS; 29	ATL; 30	NSH; 31	BRI; 33	TEX; 41	PHO; DNQ	TAL; DNQ	DAR	RCH	CLT	DOV	NSH; 12	KEN; 28	MLW; 33	DAY	CHI	NHA	PPR	GTY	IRP	GLN	MCH	BRI	CAL	RCH	DOV	KAN	CLT	MEM	TEX	PHO	HOM	54th	872	

==== Craftsman Truck Series ====
NASCAR Craftsman Truck Series results
Year	Team	No.	Make	1	2	3	4	5	6	7	8	9	10	11	12	13	14	15	16	17	18	19	20	21	22	23	24	25	NCTC	Pts	Ref
2002	Ware Racing Enterprises	51	Dodge	DAY	DAR	MAR	GTY	PPR	DOV	TEX	MEM; 26	MLW; 16	KAN	KEN	NHA	MCH	IRP	NSH	RCH	TEX									35th	624	
2002	Bobby Hamilton Racing	4	Dodge																		SBO; 10	LVS; 14	CAL; QL^{†}	PHO; 26	HOM; 28				35th	624	
2003	Billy Ballew Motorsports	15	Dodge	DAY	DAR	MMR	MAR	CLT	DOV	TEX	MEM	MLW	KAN	KEN	GTW	MCH	IRP	NSH; 20	BRI; 28	RCH; 15	NHA	CAL	LVS	SBO	TEX	MAR	PHO	HOM	68th	300	
^{†} - Replaced by Rick Bogart.

=== ARCA Re/Max Series ===
(key) (Bold – Pole position awarded by qualifying time. Italics – Pole position earned by points standings or practice time. * – Most laps led.)

ARCA Re/Max Series results
Year	Team	No.	Make	1	2	3	4	5	6	7	8	9	10	11	12	13	14	15	16	17	18	19	20	21	22	ARMC	Pts	Ref
2004	Braun Racing	77	Dodge	DAY; 5																						17th	2780	
2004	Braun Racing	64	Dodge		**NSH**; 15*	SLM	KEN; 1*		**CLT**; 1	**KAN**; 1*	POC; 7*	MCH; 33	SBO	BLN	KEN; 1*	**GTW**; 1*	**POC**; 1*	LER	**NSH**; 40	ISF	TOL	DSF	CHI; 28	SLM	TAL; 4	17th	2780	
2004	KLM Motorsports	19	Chevy					TOL; 4																		17th	2780	
