= Brandon Miller (racing driver) =

American racing driver (born 1981)

- Born: August 28, 1981 (age 45); Rancho Santa Fe, California, U.S.
- Achievements: 3-time Junior Shifter Kart Association Champion; 1998 U.S. Nationals Champion; 2002 Mesa Marin Raceway Super Late Model Champion
- Awards: 1998 San Diego Amateur Athlete of the Month; 1999 Irwindale Speedway Most Promising Driver

NASCAR O'Reilly Auto Parts Series career
- 14 races run over 3 years
- Best finish: 48th (2005)
- First race: 2004 Mr. Goodcents 300 (Kansas)
- Last race: 2007 Sam's Town 250 (Memphis)
Wins	Top tens	Poles
0	2	0

NASCAR FedEx Freight Truck Series career
- 11 races run over 4 years
- Best finish: 46th (2007)
- First race: 2003 Lucas Oil 250 (Mesa Marin)
- Last race: 2007 Missouri-Illinois Dodge Dealers Ram Tough 200 (Gateway)
Wins	Top tens	Poles
0	1	0
- Statistics up to date as of June 7, 2012.

Brandon Miller (born August 28, 1981) is an American former professional stock car racing driver. He is a former member of the Richard Childress Racing driver development program.

== Early career ==
Miller began his career at the age of 12 in kart racing in the Junior Shifter Kart Association, winning the Grand National championship three times. In 1998, he won the U.S. Nationals while competing in various parts of the world. He would eventually be inducted into the Hall of Champions in San Diego and was named San Diego's "Amateur Athlete of the Month." He began racing stock cars the following season at Irwindale Speedway. In his second year competing, he won four races and twelve top-fives. He then moved to Mesa Marin Raceway and won the track championship in 2002.

== NASCAR career ==
In 2003, Miller ran four NASCAR Grand National Division, West Series races, finishing in the top ten twice. He made his major league NASCAR debut at Mesa Marin in the NASCAR Craftsman Truck Series, finishing eighth in the No. 6 Chevrolet Silverado owned by Kevin Harvick Incorporated. He ran three more Truck races that season in the No. 68 truck owned by his father; his best finish was 14th at Las Vegas Motor Speedway. The following season he ran another Truck Series race in the No. 2 Team ASE Racing Dodge Ram for Ultra Motorsports at Las Vegas, finishing 20th, as well as making his Busch Series debut with Richard Childress' No. 29 team at Kansas Speedway, where he finished sixteenth.

In 2005, Miller was hired to drive the No. 21 Reese's Chevrolet Monte Carlo in the Busch Series for twelve races, sharing the ride with Kevin Harvick. Miller posted two top-ten finishes over the course of the season and finished 48th in the final standings. Harvick's decision to run the full Busch schedule in 2006 forced Miller out of a permanent position with RCR. He remained with the team as a fabricator and test driver, occasionally practicing and qualifying race cars for the team as necessary. He spent 2007 driving the No. 40 Westerman Companies Chevrolet for Curtis Key.

Miller made his first attempt at a NASCAR race since 2007 when he piloted the No. 14 Chevrolet for NTS Motorsports at Texas Motor Speedway in the Camping World Truck Series on June 8, 2012.

== Motorsports career results ==
=== NASCAR ===
(key) (Bold – Pole position awarded by qualifying time. Italics – Pole position earned by points standings or practice time. * – Most laps led.)

==== Busch Series ====
NASCAR Busch Series results
Year	Team	No.	Make	1	2	3	4	5	6	7	8	9	10	11	12	13	14	15	16	17	18	19	20	21	22	23	24	25	26	27	28	29	30	31	32	33	34	35	NBSC	Pts	Ref
2004	Richard Childress Racing	29	Chevy	DAY	CAR	LVS	DAR	BRI	TEX	NSH	TAL	CAL	GTY	RCH	NZH	CLT	DOV	NSH	KEN	MLW	DAY	CHI	NHA	PPR	IRP	MCH	BRI	CAL	RCH	DOV	KAN; 16	CLT	MEM	ATL	PHO	DAR	HOM		112th	115	
2005	Richard Childress Racing	21	Chevy	DAY	CAL	MXC	LVS	ATL; 32	NSH; 25	BRI	TEX; 36	PHO	TAL	DAR	RCH	CLT	DOV	NSH; 43	KEN; 16	MLW; 24	DAY	CHI	NHA	PPR; 10	GTY; 6	IRP; 39	GLN	MCH	BRI	CAL; 23	RCH	DOV	KAN	CLT	MEM; 20	TEX			48th	977	
2005	Collins Motorsports	61	Chevy																																		PHO; 39	HOM	48th	977	
2007	Richard Childress Racing	29	Chevy	DAY	CAL	MXC	LVS	ATL	BRI	NSH	TEX	PHO	TAL	RCH	DAR	CLT	DOV	NSH	KEN	MLW	NHA	DAY	CHI	GTY	IRP; QL^{†}														143rd	52	
2007	Richard Childress Racing	21	Chevy																							CGV; QL^{‡}	GLN	MCH	BRI	CAL	RCH	DOV	KAN	CLT					143rd	52	
2007	Kevin Harvick Incorporated	77	Chevy																																MEM; 37	TEX	PHO	HOM	143rd	52	
^{†} - Qualified for Scott Wimmer . ^{‡} - Qualified for Kevin Harvick

==== Craftsman Truck Series ====
NASCAR Craftsman Truck Series results
Year	Team	No.	Make	1	2	3	4	5	6	7	8	9	10	11	12	13	14	15	16	17	18	19	20	21	22	23	24	25	NCWTC	Pts	Ref
2003	Kevin Harvick Incorporated	6	Chevy	DAY	DAR	MMR; 8	MAR	CLT	DOV	TEX	MEM	MLW	KAN	KEN	GTW	MCH	IRP	NSH	BRI	RCH	NHA								51st	454	
2003	Bradford Miller	68	Chevy																			CAL; 26	LVS; 14	SBO	TEX	MAR	PHO; 19	HOM	51st	454	
2004	Ultra Motorsports	2	Dodge	DAY	ATL	MAR	MFD	CLT	DOV	TEX	MEM	MLW	KAN	KEN	GTW	MCH	IRP	NSH	BRI	RCH	NHA	LVS; 20	CAL	TEX	MAR	PHO	DAR	HOM	88th	103	
2007	Key Motorsports	40	Chevy	DAY	CAL	ATL	MAR	KAN	CLT	MFD	DOV	TEX	MCH	MLW	MEM	KEN; 19	IRP; 23	NSH; 22	BRI; 25	GTW; 27	NHA	LVS	TAL	MAR	ATL	TEX	PHO	HOM	46th	467	
2012	NTS Motorsports	14	Chevy	DAY	MAR	CAR	KAN	CLT	DOV	TEX; 20	KEN	IOW	CHI	POC	MCH	BRI	ATL	IOW	KEN	LVS	TAL	MAR	TEX	PHO	HOM				NA	0^{1}	

^{*} Season still in progress
^{1} Ineligible for series points
