= Wade Day =

American racing driver (born 1972)

- Born: December 28, 1972 (age 53); Whitesburg, Kentucky, U.S.

NASCAR O'Reilly Auto Parts Series career
- 2 races run over 1 year
- Best finish: 99th (2005)
- First race: 2005 Meijer 300 Presented by Oreo (Kentucky)
- Last race: 2005 SBC 250 (Milwaukee)
| Wins | Top tens | Poles |
|---|---|---|
| 0 | 0 | 0 |
- Statistics up to date as of December 10, 2024.

Wade Day (born December 28, 1972) is an American former professional stock car racing driver who has previously competed in the NASCAR Busch Series and the NASCAR Goody's Dash Series.

Day has also previously competed in series such as the X-1R Pro Cup Series, the ASA National Tour, the IPOWER Dash Series, and the ISCARS Dash Series, where he won the championship in 2005.

== Motorsports results ==
=== NASCAR ===
(key) (Bold - Pole position awarded by qualifying time. Italics - Pole position earned by points standings or practice time. * – Most laps led.)

==== Busch Series ====
NASCAR Busch Series results
| Year | Team | No. | Make | 1 | 2 | 3 | 4 | 5 | 6 | 7 | 8 | 9 | 10 | 11 | 12 | 13 | 14 | 15 | 16 | 17 | 18 | 19 | 20 | 21 | 22 | 23 | 24 | 25 | 26 | 27 | 28 | 29 | 30 | 31 | 32 | 33 | 34 | 35 | NBSC | Pts | Ref |
|---|---|---|---|---|---|---|---|---|---|---|---|---|---|---|---|---|---|---|---|---|---|---|---|---|---|---|---|---|---|---|---|---|---|---|---|---|---|---|---|---|---|
| 2005 | MacDonald Motorsports | 72 | Chevy | DAY | CAL | MXC | LVS | ATL | NSH | BRI | TEX | PHO | TAL | DAR | RCH | CLT | DOV | NSH | KEN; 29 | MLW; 31 | DAY | CHI; DNQ | NHA | PPR | GTY | IRP | GLN | MCH | BRI | CAL | RCH | DOV | KAN | CLT | MEM | TEX | PHO | HOM | 99th | 146 | |

==== Goody's Dash Series ====
NASCAR Goody's Dash Series results
| Year | Team | No. | Make | 1 | 2 | 3 | 4 | 5 | 6 | 7 | 8 | NGDS | Pts | Ref |
|---|---|---|---|---|---|---|---|---|---|---|---|---|---|---|
| 2003 | N/A | 52 | Toyota | DAY | OGL | CLT | SBO; 22 | GRE; DSQ | KEN | BRI; 24 | **ATL**; 20 | 33rd | 291 | |

=== CARS Super Late Model Tour ===
(key)

CARS Super Late Model Tour results
| Year | Team | No. | Make | 1 | 2 | 3 | 4 | 5 | 6 | 7 | 8 | 9 | 10 | CSLMTC | Pts | Ref |
|---|---|---|---|---|---|---|---|---|---|---|---|---|---|---|---|---|
| 2016 | Highland Motorsports | 96 | N/A | SNM | ROU | HCY | TCM | GRE | ROU; 22 | CON | MYB | HCY | SNM | 59th | 11 | |

Sporting positions
| Preceded by Johnny Chapman | ISCARS Dash Series Champion; 2005 | Succeeded by Eric Wilson |
