= Ryan Moore (racing driver) =

American racing driver (born 1983)

- Born: August 10, 1983 (age 43); Scarborough, Maine, U.S.
- Awards: 2003 Busch North Series Rookie of the Year

NASCAR O'Reilly Auto Parts Series career
- 4 races run over 2 years
- Best finish: 84th (2005)
- First race: 2005 New England 200 (Loudon)
- Last race: 2006 Bashas' Supermarkets 200 (Phoenix)
Wins	Top tens	Poles
0	0	0

NASCAR FedEx Freight Truck Series career
- 11 races run over 1 year
- Best finish: 36th (2006)
- First race: 2006 City of Mansfield 250 (Mansfield)
- Last race: 2006 New Hampshire 200 (Loudon)
Wins	Top tens	Poles
0	0	0
- Statistics up to date as of April 17, 2013.

Ryan Moore (born October 8, 1983) is an American stock car racing driver who currently races super late models in the Southern United States. He previously competed in NASCAR, winning the 2003 Busch North Series Rookie of the Year award and winning two races and three poles en route to a career-best 5th-place points finish in 2005. He then made a total of 15 starts in the Busch Series and Craftsman Truck Series between 2005 and 2006.

== Racing career ==
=== 2005 ===
Moore had his best season in the Busch North Series in 2005, winning two races and three poles, along with posting career highs in top-fives (eight) and top-tens (ten) en route to a fifth-place points finish. His victory at Lake Erie Speedway was a wire-to-wire victory, as Moore led all 150 laps from the pole in that race.

Moore also made his Busch Series debut, driving the No. 81 Oreo/Kraft Foods Chevrolet Monte Carlo for Dale Earnhardt, Inc. He made his debut at New Hampshire International Speedway, and had his best finish at Homestead-Miami Speedway, where he finished 13th.

Moore and team owner Dale Earnhardt Jr. reportedly had a falling out following the 2005 season, and would part ways before the next season.

=== 2006 ===
In 2006, Moore went to race in the Craftsman Truck Series for Key Motorsports, making 11 starts and posting two top-15 finishes.

Moore also made one Busch Series start in 2006 at Phoenix International Raceway for Braun-Akins Racing, where he finished 29th.

== Personal life ==
Moore's father is fellow race car driver Kelly Moore, who is the all-time wins leader in K&N Pro Series East history. Currently, he is working for his father at their trucking company R.C MOORE INC., out of the Troutman, NC terminal.

== Motorsports career results ==
=== NASCAR ===
(key) (Bold – Pole position awarded by qualifying time. Italics – Pole position earned by points standings or practice time. * – Most laps led.)

==== Busch Series ====
NASCAR Busch Series results
Year	Team	No.	Make	1	2	3	4	5	6	7	8	9	10	11	12	13	14	15	16	17	18	19	20	21	22	23	24	25	26	27	28	29	30	31	32	33	34	35	NBSC	Pts	Ref
2005	Chance 2 Motorsports	81	Chevy	DAY	CAL	MXC	LVS	ATL	NSH	BRI	TEX	PHO	TAL	DAR	RCH	CLT	DOV	NSH	KEN	MLW	DAY	CHI	NHA; 34	PPR	GTY	IRP	GLN	MCH	BRI	CAL	RCH; 32	DOV	KAN	CLT	MEM	TEX	PHO	HOM; 13	84th	252	
2006	Braun-Akins Racing	38	Chevy	DAY	CAL	MXC	LVS	ATL	BRI	TEX	NSH	PHO; 29	TAL	RCH	DAR	CLT	DOV	NSH	KEN	MLW	DAY	CHI	NHA	MAR	GTY	IRP	GLN	MCH	BRI	CAL	RCH	DOV	KAN	CLT	MEM	TEX	PHO	HOM	124th	76	

==== Craftsman Truck Series Series ====
NASCAR Camping World Truck Series results
Year	Team	No.	Make	1	2	3	4	5	6	7	8	9	10	11	12	13	14	15	16	17	18	19	20	21	22	23	24	25	NCTC	Pts	Ref
2006	Key Motorsports	40	Chevy	DAY	CAL	ATL	MAR	GTY	CLT	MFD; 36	DOV; DNQ	TEX; 14	MCH; 27	MLW; 21	KAN; 34	KEN; 32	MEM; 31	IRP; 35	NSH; 18	BRI; 31	NHA; 15	LVS	TAL	MAR	ATL	TEX	PHO	HOM	36th	911	

==== Busch East Series ====
NASCAR Busch East Series results
Year	Team	No.	Make	1	2	3	4	5	6	7	8	9	10	11	12	13	14	15	16	17	NBESC	Pts	Ref
2003	Moore Racing	74	Chevy	LEE; 9	STA; 3	ERI; 6	BEE; 3	STA; 5	HOL; 20	TMP; 9	NHA; 4	WFD; 10	SEE; 5	GLN; 35	ADI; 8	BEE; 15	THU; 25	NHA; 6	STA; 12	LRP; 34	11th	2212	
2004	Moore Racing	74	Chevy	LEE; 4	**TMP**; 5	LRP; 13	SEE; 9	STA; 15	HOL; 4	ERI; 11	WFD; 8	NHA; 5	ADI; 9*	GLN; 33	NHA; 3	DOV; 14					6th	1800	
2005	Moore Racing	74	Chevy	STA; 28	HOL; 9	**ERI**; 1*	NHA; 3	WFD; 9	**ADI**; 3	STA; 1	DUB; 3	OXF; 2	NHA; 3	**DOV**; 2*	LRP; 13	TMP					5th	1859	
2006	Moore Racing	74	Chevy	GRE; 24	STA	HOL	TMP	ERI	NHA	ADI	WFD	NHA	DOV	LRP							57th	96	
2007	Moore Racing	74	Chevy	GRE	ELK	IOW	SBO	STA	NHA	TMP	NSH	ADI	LRP	MFD	NHA; 8	DOV					56th	142	

==== West Series ====
NASCAR West Series results
Year	Team	No.	Make	1	2	3	4	5	6	7	8	9	10	11	12	NWSC	Pts	Ref
2005	Moore Racing	74	Chevy	PHO	MMR	PHO; 3	S99	IRW	EVG	S99	PPR	CAL	DCS	CTS	MMR	37th	170	

=== CARS Super Late Model Tour ===
(key)

CARS Super Late Model Tour results
Year	Team	No.	Make	1	2	3	4	5	6	7	8	9	CSLMTC	Pts	Ref
2018	Kelly Moore	74M	Toyota	MYB; 3	NSH	ROU; 9	HCY	BRI	AND	HCY	ROU	SBO	22nd	54	
2019	Kelly Moore	74	Toyota	SNM	HCY	NSH	MMS; 12	BRI	HCY	ROU	SBO		37th	21	
2021	Kelly Moore	74	Toyota	HCY; 3	GPS	NSH	JEN	HCY	MMS	TCM	SBO; 2		11th	61	

=== CARS Pro Late Model Tour ===
(key)

CARS Pro Late Model Tour results
Year	Team	No.	Make	1	2	3	4	5	6	7	8	9	10	11	12	13	CPLMTC	Pts	Ref
2022	Moore Racing	74	Toyota	CRW	HCY; 12	GPS	FCS; 1	TCM	HCY	ACE	MMS	TCM; 5	ACE				12th	110	
2022	Moore Racing	74	Chevy											SBO; 8*	CRW		12th	110	
2023	Moore Racing	74	Toyota	SNM	HCY	ACE	NWS	TCM	DIL	CRW	WKS	HCY	TCM	SBO; 5	TCM; 7	CRW	30th	53	
2024	Moore Racing	74	Toyota	SNM	HCY	OCS	ACE; 8	TCM	CRW	HCY	NWS	ACE	FLC	SBO	TCM	NWS	N/A	0	
2026	Moore Racing	74	Chevy	SNM	NSV	CRW	ACE	NWS	HCY	AND	FLC	TCM	NPS	SBO; 6			43rd	37	

=== ASA STARS National Tour ===
(key) (Bold – Pole position awarded by qualifying time. Italics – Pole position earned by points standings or practice time. * – Most laps led. ** – All laps led.)

ASA STARS National Tour results
Year	Team	No.	Make	1	2	3	4	5	6	7	8	9	10	ASNTC	Pts	Ref
2023	Moore Racing	74	Chevy	FIF; 25	MAD	NWS; DNQ	HCY	MLW	AND	WIR	TOL	WIN	NSV	78th	35	
