= Keith Murt =

American racing driver

- Born: March 1, 1957 (age 69); Paducah, Kentucky, U.S.

NASCAR O'Reilly Auto Parts Series career
- 1 race run over 1 year
- Best finish: 142nd (2004)
- First race: 2004 Winn-Dixie 250 (Daytona)
Wins	Top tens	Poles
0	0	0

ARCA Menards Series career
- 23 races run over 6 years
- Best finish: 29th (2003)
- First race: 2001 Pork. The Other White Meat 400 (Atlanta)
- Last race: 2005 Food World 300 (Talladega)
Wins	Top tens	Poles
0	3	0
- Statistics up to date as of March 27, 2024.

Keith Murt (born March 1, 1957) is an American professional auto racing driver and team owner who competed in the NASCAR Busch Series, the ARCA Re/Max Series, and the National Hot Rod Association.

From 2001 to 2005, Murt ran in 23 races in the ARCA Re/Max Series, getting three top-tens with a best result of sixth at Kentucky Speedway in 2004, with his most recent start in the series coming in 2005 at Talladega Superspeedway. He also made one NASCAR Busch Series start that year at Daytona International Speedway, where he finished 38th due to a multi-car crash midway through the race.

After the NASCAR and ARCA career ended, Murt has since competed in the NHRA, having mainly driven and owned his own team in the Top Fuel category.

== Motorsports results ==
=== NASCAR ===
(key) (Bold – Pole position awarded by qualifying time. Italics – Pole position earned by points standings or practice time. * – Most laps led.)

==== Busch Series ====
NASCAR Busch Series results
Year	Team	No.	Make	1	2	3	4	5	6	7	8	9	10	11	12	13	14	15	16	17	18	19	20	21	22	23	24	25	26	27	28	29	30	31	32	33	34	35	NBSC	Pts	Ref
2002	KLM Motorsports	79	Chevy	DAY	CAR	LVS	DAR	BRI	TEX	NSH	TAL	CAL	RCH	NHA	NZH	CLT	DOV	NSH	KEN	MLW	DAY	CHI	GTY	PPR	IRP	MCH; DNQ	BRI	DAR	RCH	DOV	KAN	CLT	MEM	ATL; DNQ	CAR	PHO	HOM		N/A	0	
2004	KLM Motorsports	79	Chevy	DAY	CAR	LVS	DAR	BRI	TEX	NSH	TAL	CAL	GTY	RCH	NZH	CLT	DOV	NSH	KEN	MLW	DAY; 38	CHI	NHA	PPR	IRP	MCH	BRI	CAL	RCH	DOV	KAN	CLT	MEM	ATL	PHO	DAR	HOM		142nd	49	
2005	KLM Motorsports	79	Chevy	DAY; DNQ	CAL	MXC	LVS	ATL	NSH	BRI	TEX	PHO	TAL	DAR	RCH	CLT	DOV	NSH	KEN	MLW	DAY	CHI	NHA	PPR	GTY	IRP	GLN	MCH	BRI	CAL	RCH	DOV	KAN	CLT	MEM	TEX	PHO	HOM	N/A	0	

=== ARCA Re/Max Series ===
(key) (Bold – Pole position awarded by qualifying time. Italics – Pole position earned by points standings or practice time. * – Most laps led.)

ARCA Re/Max Series results
Year	Team	No.	Make	1	2	3	4	5	6	7	8	9	10	11	12	13	14	15	16	17	18	19	20	21	22	23	24	25	ARSC	Pts	Ref
2001	KLM Motorsports	19	Chevy	DAY	NSH	WIN	SLM	GTY	KEN	CLT	KAN	MCH	POC	MEM	GLN	KEN	MCH	POC	NSH	ISF	CHI	DSF	SLM	TOL	BLN	CLT	TAL	ATL; 35	180th	55	
2002	KLM Motorsports	19	Chevy	DAY	ATL; 11	NSH; 15	SLM	KEN; 33	CLT	KAN	POC	MCH; 16	TOL	SBO	KEN; 36	BLN	POC	NSH; 23	ISF	WIN	DSF	CHI; 39	SLM	TAL; 32	CLT				35th	810	
2003	KLM Motorsports	19	Chevy	DAY; DNQ	ATL; DNQ	NSH; 33	SLM	TOL	KEN; 14	CLT	BLN	KAN; 9	MCH; 32	LER	POC	POC	NSH; 12	ISF	WIN	DSF	CHI	SLM	TAL; 8	CLT; 38	SBO				29th	910	
2004	KLM Motorsports	19	Pontiac	DAY; 37																									41st	705	
2004	KLM Motorsports	19	Chevy		NSH; 13	SLM	KEN; 6	TOL	CLT; 11	KAN	POC	MCH; 34	SBO	BLN	KEN	GTW	POC	LER	NSH	ISF	TOL	DSF	CHI	SLM	TAL; 34				41st	705	
2005	KLM Motorsports	19	Chevy	DAY; 39	NSH	SLM	KEN	TOL	LAN	MIL	POC	MCH	KAN	KEN	BLN	POC	GTW	LER	NSH	MCH	ISF	TOL	DSF	CHI	SLM	TAL; 31			148th	110	
2006	KLM Motorsports	19	Chevy	DAY; DNQ	NSH	SLM	WIN	KEN	TOL	POC	MCH	KAN	KEN	BLN	POC	GTW	NSH	MCH	ISF	MIL	TOL	DSF	CHI	SLM	TAL	IOW			N/A	0	
