= Chance 2 Motorsports =

Former NASCAR team

- Owner(s): Teresa Earnhardt; Dale Earnhardt Jr.
- Series: NASCAR Busch Series
- Race drivers: Martin Truex Jr.; Dale Earnhardt Jr.; Tony Stewart; Steve Park; Hank Parker Jr.; Ryan Moore
- Manufacturer: Chevrolet
- Opened: 2003
- Closed: 2005

Career
- Debut: 2003 Koolerz 300 (Daytona)
- Latest race: 2005 Ford 300 (Homestead)
- Races competed: 94
- Drivers' Championships: 2
- Race victories: 16
- Pole positions: 12

Chance 2 Motorsports was an American NASCAR racing team that was founded by Teresa Earnhardt and Dale Earnhardt Jr. in 2003. Although connected with Dale Earnhardt, Inc., the race team founded by Dale Earnhardt and run by Teresa Earnhardt after his death, the two were separate operations.

The team ran in the NASCAR Busch Series for the three years it was in operation. The team fielded the No. 8 Bass Pro Shops/Yum! Brands Chevrolet for Martin Truex Jr. full time in 2004 and 2005 and the No. 81 under various sponsorships and for various drivers including Earnhardt Jr., Truex, and Tony Stewart. Truex scored two Busch Series championships and twelve wins for the team in its 3-year existence. Between 2003 and 2005, Earnhardt Jr. also won four races for Chance 2.

== History ==
Chance 2 was founded in 2003 by Teresa Earnhardt, widow of Dale Earnhardt, and Earnhardt's son Dale Earnhardt Jr. The team name originates from Chance Racing, the team Earnhardt Sr. founded for his children Kerry, Kelley, and Dale Jr. which was the precursor to Dale Earnhardt, Inc. (DEI) After the 2000 season, DEI did not field a Busch Series team and only made two one-off starts with Earnhardt Jr. at Daytona in 2002 and 2004, winning both races. DEI later re-entered the series with Paul Menard in the second-half of 2004. Chance 2 originally competed part-time in the 2003 NASCAR Busch Series season, with five drivers making a combined 14 starts in the No. 8/81 car. Earnhardt Jr. won three times for the team in his first three attempts, while the team scored five more top fives with other drivers. In 2004 and 2005, Martin Truex Jr. drove full-time in the No. 8, winning six races and the series championship in each season. Earnhardt, Tony Stewart, and Ryan Moore ran a combined eleven races in the No. 81 over those two seasons, with Earnhardt winning at Bristol in 2004. After the season, Chance 2 folded its operations, the remnants of the team becoming JR Motorsports, which later merged operations with Hendrick Motorsports after 2007.

== Busch Series ==
=== Car No. 8 history ===
The No. 8 car began as a part-time effort in 2003, with Earnhardt Jr. running all the superspeedway races (Daytona and Talladega), winning all three. He led the most laps in the Koolerz 300 and the Aaron's 312 and led all the laps in the Winn-Dixie 250 in July. Steve Park ran at Las Vegas in March, finishing fourth. Martin Truex Jr. ran three races with the car being renumbered to No. 81: Richmond, Dover, and Bristol. He also failed to qualify for the fall Dover race. Truex later ran the No. 8 late in the season at Charlotte, Rockingham, and Homestead, finishing second twice. Hank Parker Jr. made three starts in the car Charlotte in May and Kansas and Atlanta in the fall, finishing seventh and fifth twice. Tony Stewart ran the No. 8 in the Cabela's 250 at Michigan in August, finishing 11th after leading the most laps.

The 2004 season saw the first full-time season for Chance 2 as Martin Truex Jr. ran the full schedule and was considered an early season favorite. Truex ran several races for Chance 2 the year before in the No. 8/81 and had made a total of fourteen previous starts in the Busch Series dating to 2001, driving one race for Phoenix Racing in the No. 1 Yellow Transportation Chevrolet, several for his father, Martin Truex, and one race for Stanton Barrett's race team. Truex was expected to battle with Kyle Busch (racing his first full NASCAR season since the Tobacco Master Settlement Agreement had taken away his Truck Series ride at Roush Racing when he was 16) for the points championship. Busch drove the No. 5 Lowe's Chevrolet for Hendrick Motorsports, the team that had won the series points championship in 2003 with Brian Vickers.

Truex's car carried sponsorship from Bass Pro Shops for a majority of the races, with Yum! Brands sponsoring for 14 races. Truex ran the first race of the season at Daytona in the No. 81, as car owner Earnhardt piloted the No. 8 as an entry for DEI. Truex's team and points then switched to the No. 8 for the second race of the season. His first victory in the No. 8 came in the Sharpie Professional 250 at Bristol in March. He followed it up with three additional victories in the next seven races: the Aaron's 312 at Talladega, the Charter 250 at Gateway, and the Goulds Pumps/ITT Industries 200 at Nazareth, the final race held at the speedway.

Truex claimed the points lead after Nazareth but quickly lost it to Busch. However, Truex put together a string of top ten finishes, regaining the points lead and putting distance between him and Busch. Truex won his fifth and sixth races of the season in the second half of the year, the Stacker 2 Hundred at Dover and the Sam's Town 250 at Memphis, and clinched the series points championship with one race to spare. In addition to six wins and the championship, he ended the 2004 season with eight poles, 17 top fives, and 26 top tens in 34 races.

Truex's 2005 season saw him claim a victory at Autodromo Hermanos Rodriguez, the first NASCAR race held in Mexico. He won at Talladega for the second consecutive year and also won at Dover in the spring. Truex's summer got off to a strong start as he won three times in six races, notching victories at Daytona, New Hampshire, and IRP. This duplicated his 2004 season total of six victories, and Truex won his second consecutive points championship by 68 points over Clint Bowyer.

After Chance 2 folded, Truex joined DEI full-time as the driver of the No. 1 car in the NEXTEL Cup Series for 2006, replacing Michael Waltrip in the second fulltime seat at Dale Earnhardt Inc.

=== Car No. 81 history ===
The No. 81 car was a part-time operation for Chance 2 and was driven most often by Earnhardt Jr., primarily with sponsorship from longtime DEI partner Nabisco but also Menards and Yum! Brands on occasion. The car first appeared in 2003 renumbered from No. 8 to No. 81 for three races at Richmond, Dover, and Bristol, all three driven by Martin Truex Jr. Although Truex finished sixth at Bristol, he failed to qualify for his next attempt at the fall Dover race. Truex competed in three more races late in the season, however they were all in the No. 8 car.

At Daytona in 2004, Truex drove the No. 81 as the No. 8 car was driven by Earnhardt Jr. under the DEI banner. Following that race, Truex switched to the No. 8 under the Chance 2 banner and the No. 81 was operated on a part-time basis. Earnhardt led the most laps at Talladega but finished second. He also competed in the July Daytona race, finishing 17th. Tony Stewart attempted the Cabela's 250 at Michigan but failed to qualify for the event. A week later, Earnhardt won the Food City 250 at Bristol piloting the No. 81 machine. Stewart later made one start for the team in the Mr. Goodcents 300 at Kansas Speedway with Bass Pro Shops/Tracker Boats sponsorship. He led 115 of 200 laps in the No. 81 before being spun out by eventual race winner Joe Nemechek and finishing 25th.

For 2005, Earnhardt finished third at Daytona in February, but failed to finish the July Daytona race. Ryan Moore took over two races later at New Hampshire, but also failed to finish. Earnhardt made his third start in the car at Bristol, finishing seventh. Moore's next finish was 32nd at Richmond, while Earnhardt finished 39th at Charlotte in October. In the final race for the car at Homestead, Moore brought home a 13th-place finish.

=== Race results ===
Note: In 2004, Dale Earnhardt Jr. drove the No. 8 car at Daytona for Dale Earnhardt, Inc. Martin Truex Jr. drove the No. 81 in that race before switching to the No. 8 for the remainder of the season.

NASCAR Busch Series results
Year	Team	No.	Make	1	2	3	4	5	6	7	8	9	10	11	12	13	14	15	16	17	18	19	20	21	22	23	24	25	26	27	28	29	30	31	32	33	34	35	NBSC	Pts	Ref
2003	Dale Earnhardt Jr.	8	Chevy	DAY; 1*	CAR					TAL; 1*	NSH	CAL									DAY; 1**	CHI	NHA	PPR	IRP														–	–	
2003	Steve Park	8	Chevy			LVS; 4	DAR	BRI	TEX																														–	–	
2003	Martin Truex Jr.	81	Chevy										RCH; 31	GTY	NZH		DOV; 18	NSH	KEN	MLW							BRI; 6	DAR	RCH	DOV; DNQ									–	–	
2003	Martin Truex Jr.	8	Chevy																													CLT; 17	MEM			CAR; 2	HOM; 2		–	–	
2003	Hank Parker Jr.	8	Chevy													CLT; 7															KAN; 5			ATL; 5	PHO				–	–	
2003	Tony Stewart	8	Chevy																							MCH; 11*													–	–	
2004	Dale Earnhardt Jr.	81	Chevy		CAR	LVS	DAR	BRI	TEX	NSH	TAL; 2*	CAL	GTY	RCH	NZH	CLT	DOV	NSH	KEN	MLW	DAY; 17	CHI	NHA	PPR	IRP		BRI; 1*	CAL	RCH	DOV									–	–	
2004	Tony Stewart	81	Chevy																							MCH; DNQ					KAN; 25	CLT	MEM	ATL	PHO	DAR	HOM		–	–	
2004	Martin Truex Jr.	81	Chevy	DAY; 28																																			1st	5173	
2004	Martin Truex Jr.	8	Chevy		CAR; 2	LVS; 14	DAR; 4	BRI; 1	TEX; 10	NSH; 23	TAL; 1	CAL; 13	GTY; 1	RCH; 7	NZH; 1	CLT; 14	DOV; 2	NSH; 2	KEN; 6	MLW; 9	DAY; 3	CHI; 14	NHA; 11	PPR; 5	IRP; 4	MCH; 3	BRI; 7	CAL; 6	RCH; 3	DOV; 1	KAN; 30	CLT; 6	MEM; 1	ATL; 9	PHO; 3	DAR; 4	HOM; 9		1st	5173	
2005	Martin Truex Jr.	8	Chevy	DAY; 4	CAL; 30	MXC; 1	LVS; 16	ATL; 11	NSH; 14	BRI; 31	TEX; 35	PHO; 9	TAL; 1	DAR; 3	RCH; 38	CLT; 7	DOV; 1	NSH; 5	KEN; 2	MLW; 2	DAY; 1	CHI; 7	NHA; 1	PPR; 4	GTY; 26	IRP; 1	GLN; 5	MCH; 4	BRI; 6	CAL; 15	RCH; 27	DOV; 12	KAN; 9	CLT; 11	MEM; 3	TEX; 11	PHO; 6	HOM; 7	1st	4937	
2005	Dale Earnhardt Jr.	81	Chevy	DAY; 3	CAL	MXC	LVS	ATL	NSH	BRI	TEX	PHO	TAL	DAR	RCH	CLT	DOV	NSH	KEN	MLW	DAY; 40	CHI							BRI; 7	CAL				CLT; 39	MEM	TEX	PHO		–	–	
2005	Ryan Moore	81	Chevy																				NHA; 34	PPR	GTY	IRP	GLN	MCH			RCH; 32	DOV	KAN					HOM; 13	–	–	

== See also ==
- JR Motorsports
