= 2005 NASCAR Busch Series =

American motorsport season

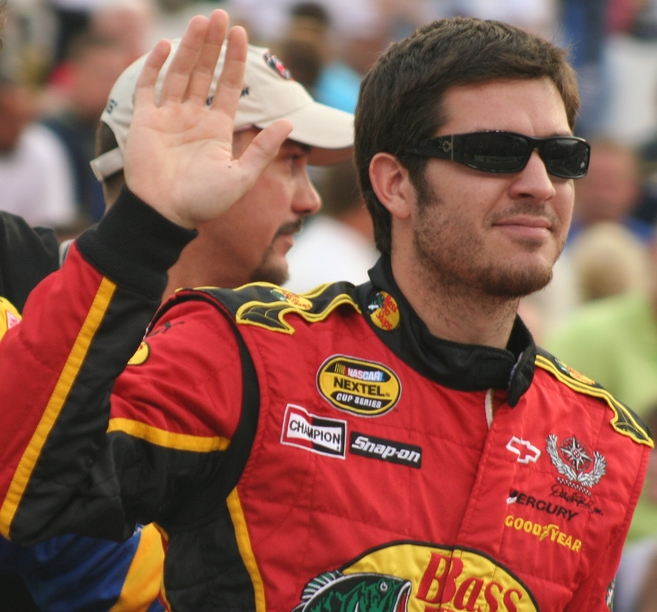
Martin Truex Jr., the 2005 Busch Series champion

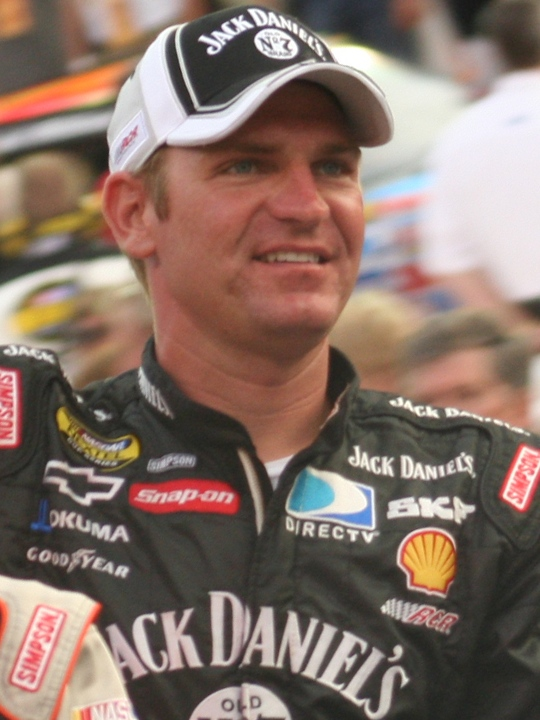
Clint Bowyer, the 2005 Busch Series runner-up

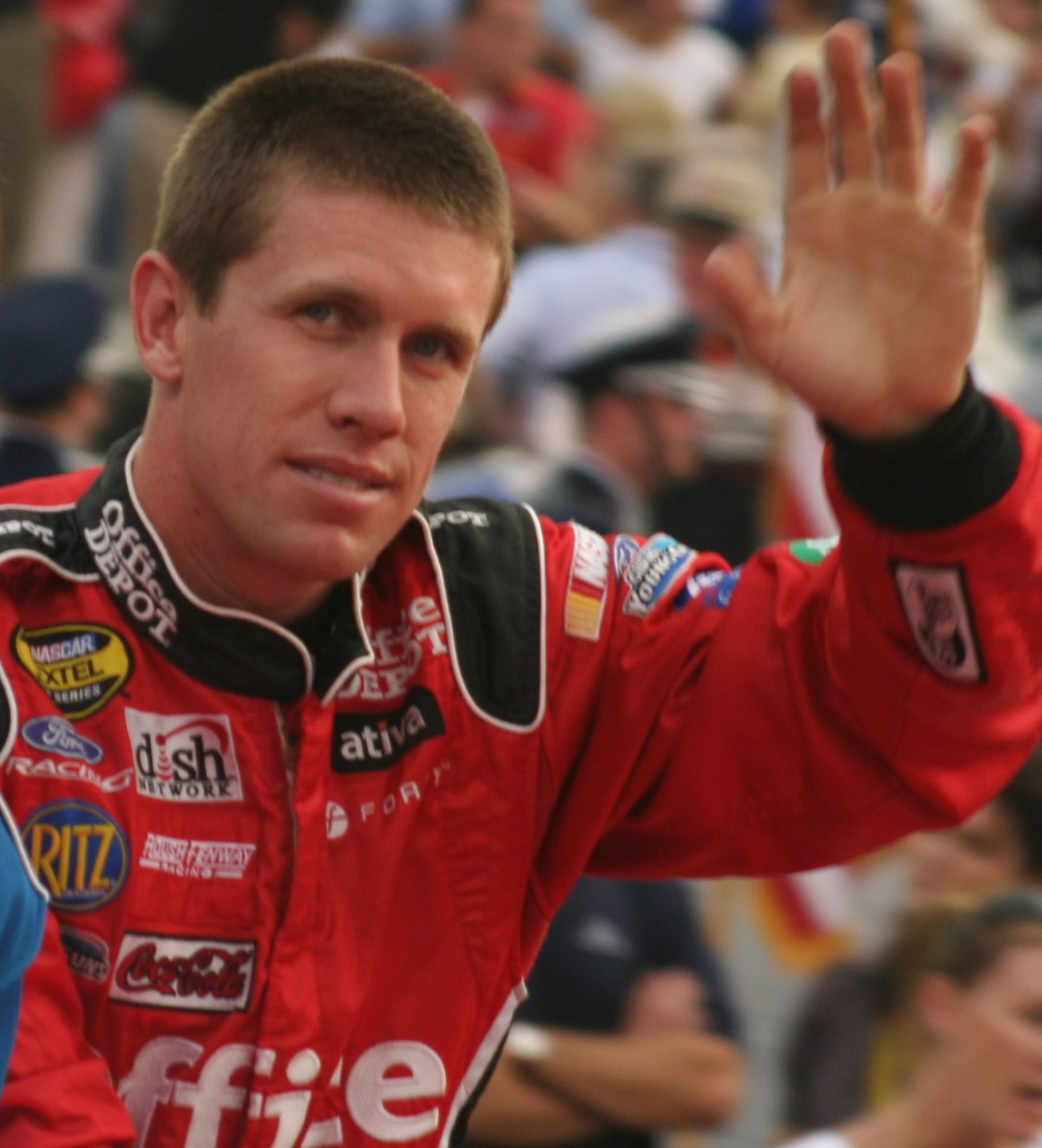
Carl Edwards, the 2005 Busch Series third place and Rookie of the year.

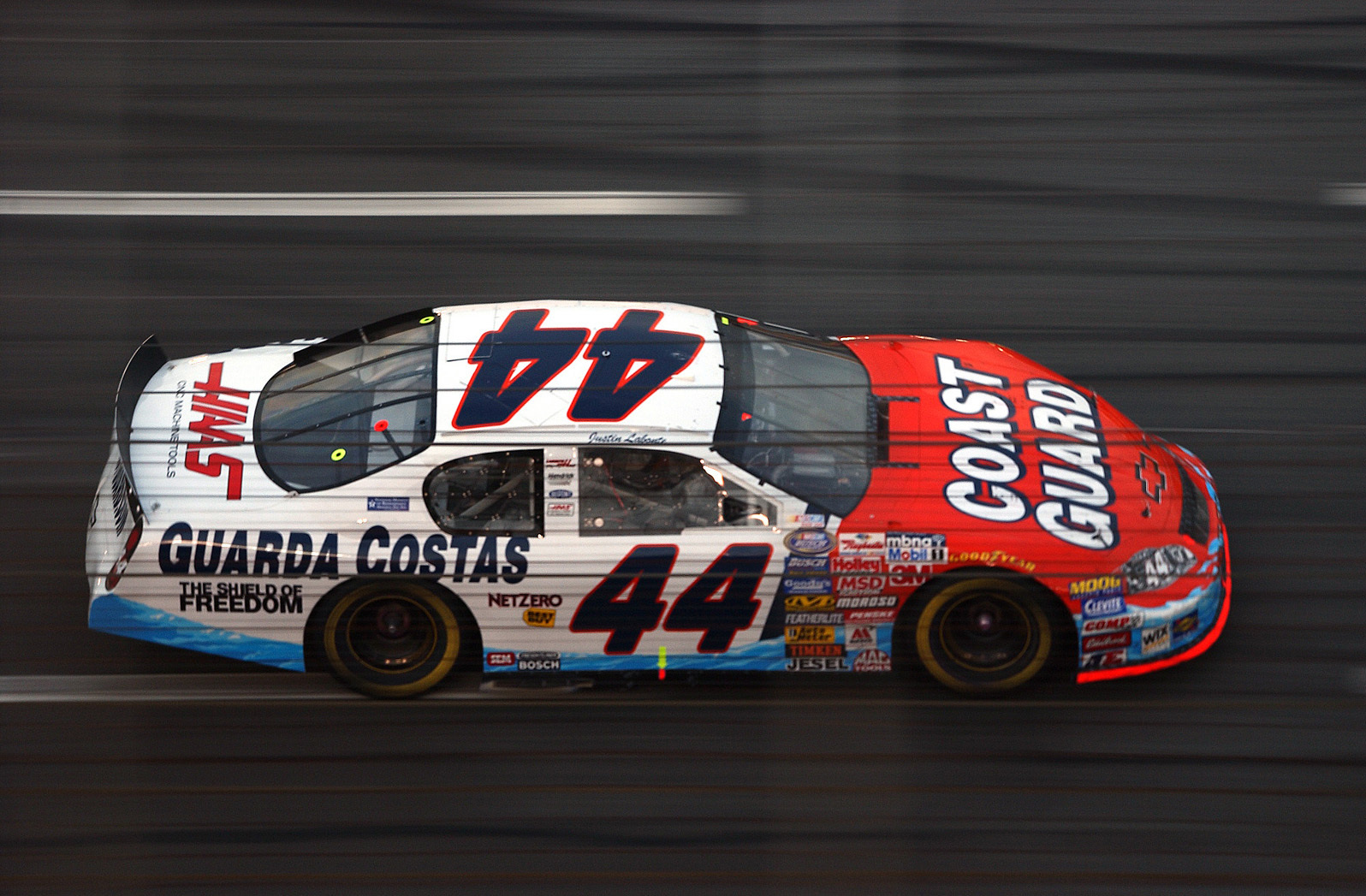
Chevrolet won the Busch series manufacturer's championship.

The 2005 NASCAR Busch Series began with the Hershey's Take 5 300 at Daytona International Speedway and concluded with the Ford 300 at Homestead-Miami Speedway. Martin Truex Jr. of Chance 2 Motorsports was crowned champion for the second consecutive year.

The year saw at least two significant changes:

- The top 30 teams in the previous season's owner points, provided that they attempted all races that season, were guaranteed starting spots in the first five races of 2005. However, only 26 teams met the criteria, so for those races additional spots were available for teams having to qualify on time. After the fifth race, the top 30 teams received the guaranteed starting spots.
- The series ran on the Autódromo Hermanos Rodríguez road course in Mexico City in March. It was the first Busch Series race conducted outside the United States.

== Teams and drivers ==
List of teams which competed throughout 2005.

=== Complete schedule ===
Manufacturer	Team	No.	Driver	Crew chief
Chevrolet	Braun Racing	32	Shane Hmiel 13	Todd Lohse
Chevrolet	Braun Racing	32	Ron Hornaday Jr. 4	Todd Lohse
Chevrolet	Braun Racing	32	Chad Blount 1	Todd Lohse
Chevrolet	Braun Racing	32	Jason Leffler 15	Todd Lohse
Chevrolet	Braun Racing	32	Jorge Goeters 2	Todd Lohse
Chevrolet	Chance 2 Motorsports	8	Martin Truex Jr.	Kevin Manion
Chevrolet	Chance 2 Motorsports	11	Paul Menard	Dan Stillman
Chevrolet	Davis Motorsports	0	Kertus Davis (R) 32	Ronnie Griffin
Chevrolet	Davis Motorsports	0	Rafael Martínez 1	Ronnie Griffin
Chevrolet	Davis Motorsports	0	Joe Fox 1	Ronnie Griffin
Chevrolet	Davis Motorsports	0	Eric McClure 1	Ronnie Griffin
Chevrolet	Frank Cicci Racing	34	Randy LaJoie 30	John Bland 5 Teddy Brown 7 Wayne Carroll Jr. 5 Dan Gibbs 16; Mike Hillman Sr. 1
Chevrolet	Frank Cicci Racing	34	Todd Bodine 5	John Bland 5 Teddy Brown 7 Wayne Carroll Jr. 5 Dan Gibbs 16; Mike Hillman Sr. 1
Chevrolet	Hendrick Motorsports	5	Kyle Busch 10	Jim Long 26; Chad Walter 9
Chevrolet	Hendrick Motorsports	5	Boston Reid (R) 6	Jim Long 26; Chad Walter 9
Chevrolet	Hendrick Motorsports	5	Adrián Fernández 6	Jim Long 26; Chad Walter 9
Chevrolet	Hendrick Motorsports	5	Blake Feese (R) 6	Jim Long 26; Chad Walter 9
Chevrolet	Hendrick Motorsports	5	Jimmie Johnson 3	Jim Long 26; Chad Walter 9
Chevrolet	Hendrick Motorsports	5	Kyle Krisiloff 3	Jim Long 26; Chad Walter 9
Chevrolet	Hendrick Motorsports	5	Brian Vickers 1	Jim Long 26; Chad Walter 9
Chevrolet	Joe Gibbs Racing	18	J. J. Yeley	Jason Ratcliff
Chevrolet	Joe Gibbs Racing	20	Denny Hamlin (R)	Tripp Bruce 7 Cully Barraclough 28
Chevrolet	Keith Coleman Racing	23	Shawna Robinson 8	Mike Byrd 1 Chris Rice
Chevrolet	Keith Coleman Racing	23	Mark Green 24	Mike Byrd 1 Chris Rice
Chevrolet	Keith Coleman Racing	23	Chris Wimmer 3	Mike Byrd 1 Chris Rice
Chevrolet	Kevin Harvick, Inc.	33	Tony Stewart 10	Butch Hylton; Wally Rogers; Mark Tutor
Chevrolet	Kevin Harvick, Inc.	33	Ron Hornaday Jr. 1	Butch Hylton; Wally Rogers; Mark Tutor
Chevrolet	Kevin Harvick, Inc.	33	Tony Raines 22	Butch Hylton; Wally Rogers; Mark Tutor
Chevrolet	Kevin Harvick, Inc.	33	Burney Lamar 2	Butch Hylton; Wally Rogers; Mark Tutor
Chevrolet	Labonte-Haas Motorsports	44	Justin Labonte	Bryant Frazier 20; Harold Holly 15
Chevrolet	MacDonald Motorsports	72	Donnie Neuenberger 1	Rodney Jackisch
Chevrolet	MacDonald Motorsports	72	Eric Norris 2	Rodney Jackisch
Chevrolet	MacDonald Motorsports	72	Rubén García Novoa 1	Rodney Jackisch
Chevrolet	MacDonald Motorsports	72	Geoff Bodine 10	Rodney Jackisch
Chevrolet	MacDonald Motorsports	72	Kevin Lepage 11	Rodney Jackisch
Chevrolet	MacDonald Motorsports	72	Wade Day 3	Rodney Jackisch
Chevrolet	MacDonald Motorsports	72	Dale Quarterley 3	Rodney Jackisch
Chevrolet	MacDonald Motorsports	72	Randy MacDonald 1	Rodney Jackisch
Chevrolet	MacDonald Motorsports	72	Paul Bonacorsi 1	Rodney Jackisch
Chevrolet	MacDonald Motorsports	72	Jason York 1	Rodney Jackisch
Chevrolet	MacDonald Motorsports	72	Travis Geisler 1	Rodney Jackisch
Chevrolet	Richard Childress Racing	2	Clint Bowyer	Gil Martin
Chevrolet	Richard Childress Racing	21	Kevin Harvick 20	Ricky Viers
Chevrolet	Richard Childress Racing	21	Brandon Miller (R) 11	Ricky Viers
Chevrolet	Richard Childress Racing	21	Jeff Burton 4	Ricky Viers
Dodge	Akins Motorsports	38	Kasey Kahne 10	Jon Wolfe 29; Gere Kennon, Jr. 6
Dodge	Akins Motorsports	38	Tyler Walker (R) 15	Jon Wolfe 29; Gere Kennon, Jr. 6
Dodge	Akins Motorsports	38	Casey Mears 1	Jon Wolfe 29; Gere Kennon, Jr. 6
Dodge	Akins Motorsports	38	Mike Wallace 5	Jon Wolfe 29; Gere Kennon, Jr. 6
Dodge	Akins Motorsports	38	A. J. Foyt IV 4	Jon Wolfe 29; Gere Kennon, Jr. 6
Dodge	Akins Motorsports	58	Brent Sherman (R) 13	Tony Lambert 4 Mark Green 2 Steve Plattenberger 9 Chris Wright 20
Dodge	Akins Motorsports	58	Regan Smith 5	Tony Lambert 4 Mark Green 2 Steve Plattenberger 9 Chris Wright 20
Dodge	Glynn Motorsports	58	Regan Smith 16	Tony Lambert 4 Mark Green 2 Steve Plattenberger 9 Chris Wright 20
Dodge	Glynn Motorsports	58	Clay Rogers 1	Tony Lambert 4 Mark Green 2 Steve Plattenberger 9 Chris Wright 20
Dodge	Biagi Brothers Racing	4	Ryan Hemphill (R) 13	Mark Tutor 6 Greg Tester 2 Matt Chambers 27
Dodge	Biagi Brothers Racing	4	Jeff Green 7	Mark Tutor 6 Greg Tester 2 Matt Chambers 27
Dodge	Biagi Brothers Racing	4	Kevin Hamlin 14	Mark Tutor 6 Greg Tester 2 Matt Chambers 27
Dodge	Biagi Brothers Racing	4	Scott Pruett 1	Mark Tutor 6 Greg Tester 2 Matt Chambers 27
Dodge	Evernham Motorsports	6	Paul Wolfe (R) 7	Elton Sawyer 9 Tripp Bruce 26
Dodge	Evernham Motorsports	6	Jeremy Mayfield 3	Elton Sawyer 9 Tripp Bruce 26
Dodge	Evernham Motorsports	6	Kasey Kahne 10	Elton Sawyer 9 Tripp Bruce 26
Dodge	Evernham Motorsports	6	Mike Wallace 3	Elton Sawyer 9 Tripp Bruce 26
Dodge	Evernham Motorsports	6	Casey Atwood 4	Elton Sawyer 9 Tripp Bruce 26
Dodge	Evernham Motorsports	6	Tracy Hines 2	Elton Sawyer 9 Tripp Bruce 26
Dodge	Evernham Motorsports	6	Bill Elliott 3	Elton Sawyer 9 Tripp Bruce 26
Dodge	Evernham Motorsports	6	Erin Crocker 3	Elton Sawyer 9 Tripp Bruce 26
Dodge	FitzBradshaw Racing	12	Tim Fedewa 21	Steve Plattenberger 6 Mark Tutor 7-12; Todd Brewer
Dodge	FitzBradshaw Racing	12	Sterling Marlin 1	Steve Plattenberger 6 Mark Tutor 7-12; Todd Brewer
Dodge	FitzBradshaw Racing	12	Joel Kauffman 7	Steve Plattenberger 6 Mark Tutor 7-12; Todd Brewer
Dodge	FitzBradshaw Racing	12	Paul Wolfe (R) 3	Steve Plattenberger 6 Mark Tutor 7-12; Todd Brewer
Dodge	FitzBradshaw Racing	12	Carlos Contreras 1	Steve Plattenberger 6 Mark Tutor 7-12; Todd Brewer
Dodge	FitzBradshaw Racing	12	Steadman Marlin 1	Steve Plattenberger 6 Mark Tutor 7-12; Todd Brewer
Dodge	FitzBradshaw Racing	12	Kertus Davis (R) 1	Steve Plattenberger 6 Mark Tutor 7-12; Todd Brewer
Dodge	FitzBradshaw Racing	14	David Stremme	Jay Guy 4 Randy Cox 31
Dodge	FitzBradshaw Racing	40	Sterling Marlin 19 (Note: Sterling Marlin qualified the No. 40 car at Atlanta (race #5), but was replaced in the race by Reed Sorenson after he failed to qualify in his own No. 41 car.)	Eddie Buffington
Dodge	FitzBradshaw Racing	40	Reed Sorenson 1	Eddie Buffington
Dodge	FitzBradshaw Racing	40	Carlos Contreras 5	Eddie Buffington
Dodge	FitzBradshaw Racing	40	Scott Lagasse Jr. 5	Eddie Buffington
Dodge	FitzBradshaw Racing	40	Johnny Benson 1	Eddie Buffington
Dodge	FitzBradshaw Racing	40	Paul Wolfe (R) 2	Eddie Buffington
Dodge	FitzBradshaw Racing	40	Stanton Barrett 2	Eddie Buffington
Dodge	FitzBradshaw Racing	40	Erin Crocker 1	Eddie Buffington
Dodge	Chip Ganassi Racing	41	Reed Sorenson (R)	Brian Pattie
Dodge	Phoenix Racing	1	Johnny Sauter 34	Tony Liberati; Joe Shear, Jr. Matt Groeschl 1 Chuck Meyers; Marc Reno
Dodge	Phoenix Racing	1	Boris Said 1	Tony Liberati; Joe Shear, Jr. Matt Groeschl 1 Chuck Meyers; Marc Reno
Dodge	Rusty Wallace, Inc.	64	Jeremy Mayfield 9	Blake Bainbridge 25; Steve Darne 10
Dodge	Rusty Wallace, Inc.	64	Jamie McMurray 14	Blake Bainbridge 25; Steve Darne 10
Dodge	Rusty Wallace, Inc.	64	Rusty Wallace 6	Blake Bainbridge 25; Steve Darne 10
Dodge	Rusty Wallace, Inc.	64	Bill Elliott 3	Blake Bainbridge 25; Steve Darne 10
Dodge	Rusty Wallace, Inc.	64	Mike Wallace 2	Blake Bainbridge 25; Steve Darne 10
Dodge	Rusty Wallace, Inc.	64	Steve Wallace 1	Blake Bainbridge 25; Steve Darne 10
Ford	Brewco Motorsports	27	David Green	Stewart Cooper
Ford	Brewco Motorsports	66	Greg Biffle 27	Newt Moore
Ford	Brewco Motorsports	66	Jorge Goeters 1	Newt Moore
Ford	Brewco Motorsports	66	Aaron Fike 7	Newt Moore
Ford	Jay Robinson Racing	49	Steve Grissom 34	Phillip Nixon 27; Kenneth Campbell 8
Ford	Jay Robinson Racing	49	Mara Reyes 1	Phillip Nixon 27; Kenneth Campbell 8
Ford	ppc Racing	10	Michel Jourdain Jr. (R) 19	Todd Gordon
Ford	ppc Racing	10	Brent Sherman (R) 15	Todd Gordon
Ford	ppc Racing	10	John Andretti 1	Todd Gordon
Ford	ppc Racing	22	Kenny Wallace	Wes Ward
Ford	Roush Racing	60	Carl Edwards (R) 34	Brad Parrott
Ford	Roush Racing	60	Hank Parker Jr. 1	Brad Parrott
Ford	ST Motorsports	47	Jon Wood (R)	Jay Guy
Ford	ST Motorsports	59	Stacy Compton	Chris Rice
Ford	Team Rensi Motorsports	25	Ashton Lewis	Charlie Lewis
Ford	Team Rensi Motorsports	35	Jason Keller	Pat Smith
Chevrolet Dodge Ford	Curb Agajanian Racing	43	A. J. Fike 8	Joe Shear, Jr. Dan Glauz; Teddy Brown
Chevrolet Dodge Ford	Curb Agajanian Racing	43	Tracy Hines 1	Joe Shear, Jr. Dan Glauz; Teddy Brown
Chevrolet Dodge Ford	Curb Agajanian Racing	43	José Luis Ramírez 1	Joe Shear, Jr. Dan Glauz; Teddy Brown
Chevrolet Dodge Ford	Curb Agajanian Racing	43	Aaron Fike 19	Joe Shear, Jr. Dan Glauz; Teddy Brown
Chevrolet Dodge Ford	Curb Agajanian Racing	43	Jeff Green 3	Joe Shear, Jr. Dan Glauz; Teddy Brown
Chevrolet Dodge Ford	Curb Agajanian Racing	43	Kevin Conway 1	Joe Shear, Jr. Dan Glauz; Teddy Brown
Chevrolet Dodge Ford	Curb Agajanian Racing	43	Todd Bodine 1	Joe Shear, Jr. Dan Glauz; Teddy Brown
Chevrolet Dodge Ford	Curb Agajanian Racing	43	Ron Fellows 1	Joe Shear, Jr. Dan Glauz; Teddy Brown
Chevrolet Pontiac	DCT Motorsports	36	Stanton Barrett 26	Ricky Pearson
Chevrolet Pontiac	DCT Motorsports	36	T. J. Bell 8	Ricky Pearson
Chevrolet Pontiac	DCT Motorsports	36	Tim Sauter 1	Ricky Pearson

=== Limited schedule ===
Manufacturer	Team	No.	Driver	Rounds
Chevrolet	Chance 2 Motorsports	81	Dale Earnhardt Jr.	4
Chevrolet	Chance 2 Motorsports	81	Ryan Moore	3
Chevrolet	Clay Andrews Racing	03	David Gilliland	1
Chevrolet	Gary Keller Motorsports	03	Kevin Conway	2
Chevrolet	Gary Keller Motorsports	03	Kenny Hendrick	1
Chevrolet	Collins Motorsports	61	Brandon Miller (R)	1
Chevrolet	Day Enterprise Racing	16	Justin Ashburn	5
Chevrolet	Day Enterprise Racing	16	John Hayden	4
Chevrolet	Day Enterprise Racing	16	Mark Montgomery	1
Chevrolet	Day Enterprise Racing	16	David Ragan	4
Chevrolet	Day Enterprise Racing	16	Chad Chaffin	1
Chevrolet	EAC Motorsports	70	Jeff Kendall	1
Chevrolet	ML Motorsports	70	Chad Blount	2
Chevrolet	Furniture Row Racing	78	Jerry Robertson	15
Chevrolet	Frank Cicci Racing	84	Randy LaJoie	1
Chevrolet	GIC-Mixon Motorsports; NEMCO Motorsports	7	Jeff Fuller	24
Chevrolet	GIC-Mixon Motorsports; NEMCO Motorsports	7	Chris Cook	2
Chevrolet	GIC-Mixon Motorsports; NEMCO Motorsports	7	Kim Crosby (R)	2
Chevrolet	GIC-Mixon Motorsports; NEMCO Motorsports	7	Mark Green	3
Chevrolet	GIC-Mixon Motorsports; NEMCO Motorsports	7	Scott Gaylord	1
Chevrolet	GIC-Mixon Motorsports; NEMCO Motorsports	7	Greg Sacks	1
Chevrolet	GIC-Mixon Motorsports	24	Kim Crosby (R)	3
Chevrolet	GIC-Mixon Motorsports	24	Jeff Fuller	1
Chevrolet	GIC-Mixon Motorsports	24	Blake Mallory	2
Chevrolet	GIC-Mixon Motorsports	24	Brad Teague	3
Chevrolet	GIC-Mixon Motorsports	24	Mike Harmon	1
Chevrolet	Henderson Motorsports	75	Jay Sauter	2
Chevrolet	Hendrick Motorsports	48	Jimmie Johnson	5
Chevrolet	Hendrick Motorsports	57	Kyle Busch	5
Chevrolet	Hendrick Motorsports	57	Brian Vickers	6
Chevrolet	Hendrick Motorsports	57	Boston Reid (R)	1
Chevrolet	Horn Auto Racing	80	Chris Horn	3
Chevrolet	Rich Woodland Racing	80	Brian Tyler	2
Chevrolet	Joe Gibbs Racing	19	Bobby Labonte	8
Chevrolet	Joe Gibbs Racing	19	Tony Stewart	1
Chevrolet	Keith Coleman Racing	26	Mark Green	1
Chevrolet	Keith Coleman Racing	26	Kim Crosby (R)	11
Chevrolet	KLM Motorsports	79	Keith Murt	1
Chevrolet	MacDonald Motorsports	71	Kevin Lepage	1
Chevrolet	MacDonald Motorsports	71	Randy MacDonald	1 (Note: Randy MacDonald qualified the No. 71 car at Pikes Peak (race #21), but was replaced in the race by Dale Quarterley after he failed to qualify in his own No. 72 car.)
Chevrolet	MacDonald Motorsports	71	Dale Quarterley	2
Chevrolet	MacDonald Motorsports	71	Derrike Cope	1
Chevrolet	RB1 Motorsports	71	Ron Young	3
Chevrolet	Mac Hill Motorsports	56	Tim Sauter	18
Chevrolet	Marc Mitchell Racing	86	Marc Mitchell	4
Chevrolet	Marsh Racing	31	Dave Blaney	10
Chevrolet	Mohegan Sun Racing	50	Matt Kobyluck	1
Chevrolet	Morgan-McClure Motorsports	04	Eric McClure	4
Chevrolet	MRG Motorsports	54	David Gilliland	1
Chevrolet	Red Cactus Racing	73	Eric Jones	3
Chevrolet	Red Cactus Racing	73	Stuart Kirby	1
Chevrolet	Red Cactus Racing	73	Kerry Earnhardt	2
Chevrolet	Red Cactus Racing	73	Jennifer Jo Cobb	1
Chevrolet	Red Cactus Racing	73	Jimmy Spencer	1
Chevrolet	Red Cactus Racing	73	Jorge Goeters	2
Chevrolet	Richard Childress Racing	29	Kevin Harvick	1
Chevrolet	Richard Childress Racing	29	Jeff Burton	1
Chevrolet	Robby Gordon Motorsports	55	Robby Gordon	3
Chevrolet	Robby Gordon Motorsports	83	Robby Gordon	1
Chevrolet	Kevin Harvick, Inc.	83	Burney Lamar	1
Chevrolet	Kevin Harvick, Inc.	83	Wally Dallenbach Jr.	2
Chevrolet	Kevin Harvick, Inc.	83	Tony Stewart	1
Chevrolet	Kevin Harvick, Inc.	83	Tony Raines	1
Chevrolet	R/T Racing	68	Travis Kittleson	3
Chevrolet	Silva Motorsports	65	Stan Silva Jr.	2
Chevrolet	SKI Motorsports	30	Scott Riggs	2
Chevrolet	SKI Motorsports	30	Ron Hornaday Jr.	5
Chevrolet	SKI Motorsports	30	Mike Bliss	1
Chevrolet	Spraker Racing	63	Jeff Spraker	1
Chevrolet	S.W.A.T. Racing	62	Larry Hollenbeck	1
Chevrolet	TC Motorsports	05	David Odell	1
Chevrolet	Tennessee Mountain Boys Racing	53	Brad Teague	2
Chevrolet	TommyRaz Motorsports	9	Wayne Edwards	1
Chevrolet	NEMCO Motorsports	87	Joe Nemechek	17
Chevrolet	NEMCO Motorsports	87	Ron Fellows	1
Chevrolet	Reary Racing	88	Brian Sockwell	4
Chevrolet	JR Motorsports	88	Mark McFarland	1
Chevrolet	Central Coast Racing	97	Todd Souza	2
Dodge	Earl Sadler Racing	95	Bobby Hamilton	5
Dodge	Earl Sadler Racing	95	Joe Ruttman	1
Dodge	Earl Sadler Racing	95	Eric Jones	1
Dodge	Evernham Motorsports	79	Kasey Kahne	2
Dodge	Evernham Motorsports	79	Jeremy Mayfield	1
Dodge	Glynn Motorsports	92	Tracy Hines	1
Dodge	Glynn Motorsports	92	Clay Rogers	1
Dodge	Chip Ganassi Racing	42	Jamie McMurray	2
Dodge	Michael Waltrip Racing	98	Jimmy Spencer	1
Dodge	Michael Waltrip Racing	98	David Reutimann	1
Dodge	Michael Waltrip Racing	98	Kerry Earnhardt	1
Dodge	Michael Waltrip Racing	99	Kerry Earnhardt	2
Dodge	Michael Waltrip Racing	99	Michael Waltrip	23
Dodge	NDS Motorsports	77	Travis Kvapil	1
Dodge	Penske Racing	39	Ryan Newman	9
Dodge	Team Johnson Motorsports	76	Jerick Johnson	1
Dodge	Tom Eriksen Racing	67	Jimmy Morales	1
Dodge	TommyRaz Motorsports	91	Wayne Edwards	1
Dodge	TommyRaz Motorsports	91	Clay Rogers	1
Dodge	TommyRaz Motorsports	91	Charlie Bradberry	1
Dodge	TommyRaz Motorsports	92	Charlie Bradberry	1
Dodge	Phoenix Racing	09	Mike Wallace	1
Dodge	Phoenix Racing	09	Eric McClure	1
Dodge	Phoenix Racing	09	Boris Said	1
Dodge	Phoenix Racing	09	Jamie McMurray	1
Dodge	Phoenix Racing	28	Johnny Sauter	1
Ford	Jay Robinson Racing	28	Derrike Cope	17 (Note: Jimmy Kitchens qualified the No. 28 car at Phoenix (race #9), but was replaced in the race by Derrike Cope after he failed to qualify in his own No. 94 car.)
Ford	Jay Robinson Racing	28	Jimmy Kitchens	2
Ford	Jay Robinson Racing	28	Tyler Walker (R)	1
Ford	Jay Robinson Racing	28	Jamie Mosley	3
Ford	Jay Robinson Racing	28	Shane Hall	7
Ford	Jay Robinson Racing	94	Derrike Cope	2
Ford	Beahr Racing Enterprises	94	Eddie Beahr	2
Ford	Beahr Racing Enterprises	94	Chad Beahr	1
Ford	Borneman Motorsports	88	Johnny Borneman III	1
Ford	Borneman Motorsports	83	Johnny Borneman III	1
Ford	Means Motorsports	52	Shane Hall	3
Ford	Means Motorsports	52	Scott Gaylord	1 (Note: Scott Gaylord qualified the No. 52 car at Mexico City (race #3), but was replaced in the race by Jimmy Morales after he failed to qualify in his own No. 67 car.)
Ford	Means Motorsports	52	Jimmy Morales	1
Ford	Means Motorsports	52	Stan Boyd	1
Ford	Means Motorsports	52	Eric McClure	14
Ford	Means Motorsports	52	Brad Teague	3
Ford	Means Motorsports	52	Donnie Neuenberger	4
Ford	Means Motorsports	52	D. J. Hoelzle	1
Ford	Means Motorsports	52	Scott Turner	1
Ford	ppc Racing	15	Brent Sherman (R)	2
Ford	ppc Racing	15	Michel Jourdain Jr. (R)	3
Ford	Robert Yates Racing	08	Elliott Sadler	1
Ford	Robert Yates Racing	90	Elliott Sadler	16
Ford	Robert Yates Racing	90	Dale Jarrett	5
Ford	Robert Yates Racing	90	Stephen Leicht	2
Ford	Vahsholtz Racing	90	Clint Vahsholtz	1
Ford	Roush Racing	9	Mark Martin	8
Ford	Roush Racing	9	Matt Kenseth	2
Ford	Roush Racing	17	Matt Kenseth	15
Ford	ST Motorsports	46	Robert Pressley	6
Ford	ST Motorsports	46	Bobby East	1
Ford	Team Fuerza Motorsports	92	Alfredo Tame Jr.	1
Ford	Tri-City Motorsports	91	Todd Shafer	2
Ford	Tri-City Motorsports	91	Brad Teague	1
Pontiac	Great Lakes Motorsports	61	Mike Wallace	1
Pontiac	Oostlander Racing	54	Mike Harmon	1
Chevrolet Ford	Premier Motorsports	85	Damon Lusk	4
Chevrolet Ford	Premier Motorsports	85	John Hayden	5
Chevrolet Ford	Premier Motorsports	85	Kevin Lepage	1
Chevrolet Dodge	Smith Brothers Motorsports	67	C. W. Smith	2
Chevrolet Dodge	Smith Brothers Motorsports	67	Ken Schrader	1
Chevrolet Dodge	Smith Brothers Motorsports	67	Bryan Reffner	3
Chevrolet Dodge	Smith Brothers Motorsports	67	Johnny Benson	4

== Schedule ==
No	Race title	Track	Date
1	Hershey's Take 5 300	Daytona International Speedway, Daytona Beach, Florida	February 19
2	Stater Brothers 300	California Speedway, Fontana, California	February 26
3	Telcel Motorola 200 presented by Banamex	Autódromo Hermanos Rodriguez, Mexico City, Mexico	March 6
4	Sam's Town 300	Las Vegas Motor Speedway, Las Vegas, Nevada	March 12
5	Aaron's 312	Atlanta Motor Speedway, Hampton, Georgia	March 19
6	Pepsi 300	Nashville Superspeedway, Gladeville, Tennessee	March 26
7	Sharpie Professional 250	Bristol Motor Speedway, Bristol, Tennessee	April 4
8	O'Reilly 300	Texas Motor Speedway, Fort Worth, Texas	April 16
9	Bashas' Supermarkets 200	Phoenix International Raceway, Avondale, Arizona	April 22
10	Aaron's 312	Talladega Superspeedway, Talladega, Alabama	April 30
11	Diamond Hill Plywood 200	Darlington Raceway, Darlington, South Carolina	May 6
12	Funai 250	Richmond International Raceway, Richmond, Virginia	May 13
13	Carquest Auto Parts 300	Lowe's Motor Speedway, Concord, North Carolina	May 28
14	MBNA RacePoints 200	Dover International Speedway, Dover, Delaware	June 4
15	Federated Auto Parts 300	Nashville Superspeedway, Gladeville, Tennessee	June 12
16	Meijer 300 presented by Oreo	Kentucky Speedway, Sparta, Kentucky	June 18
17	SBC 250	Milwaukee Mile, West Allis, Wisconsin	June 25
18	Winn-Dixie 250 presented by PepsiCo	Daytona International Speedway, Daytona Beach, Florida	July 1
19	USG Durock 300	Chicagoland Speedway, Joliet, Illinois	July 9
20	New England 200	New Hampshire Motor Speedway, Loudon, New Hampshire	July 16
21	ITT Industries & Goulds Pumps Salute to the Troops 250	Pikes Peak International Raceway, Fountain, Colorado	July 23
22	Wallace Family Tribute 250 presented by Shop 'n Save	Gateway International Raceway, Madison, Illinois	July 30
23	Kroger 200	Indianapolis Raceway Park, Brownsburg, Indiana	August 6
24	Zippo 200	Watkins Glen International, Watkins Glen, New York	August 13
25	Domino's Pizza 250	Michigan International Speedway, Brooklyn, Michigan	August 20
26	Food City 250	Bristol Motor Speedway, Bristol, Tennessee	August 26
27	Ameriquest 300	California Speedway, Fontana, California	September 3
28	Emerson Radio 250	Richmond International Raceway, Richmond, Virginia	September 9
29	Dover 200	Dover International Speedway, Dover, Delaware	September 24
30	United Way 300	Kansas Speedway, Kansas City, Kansas	October 8
31	Dollar General 300	Lowe's Motor Speedway, Concord, North Carolina	October 14
32	Sam's Town 250	Memphis Motorsports Park, Millington, Tennessee	October 22
33	O'Reilly Challenge	Texas Motor Speedway, Fort Worth, Texas	November 5
34	Arizona 200	Phoenix International Raceway, Avondale, Arizona	November 12
35	Ford 300	Homestead-Miami Speedway, Homestead, Florida	November 19

== Races ==
=== Hershey's Take 5 300 ===
The Hershey's Take 5 300 was held on February 19 at Daytona International Speedway. Joe Nemechek was the polesitter.

Top ten results

1. #33 - Tony Stewart*
2. #21 - Kevin Harvick
3. #81 - Dale Earnhardt Jr.
4. #8 - Martin Truex Jr.
5. #38 - Kasey Kahne
6. #55 - Robby Gordon
7. #99 - Michael Waltrip
8. #66 - Greg Biffle
9. #41 - Reed Sorenson
10. #60 - Carl Edwards

Failed to qualify: C. W. Smith (#67), Brent Sherman (#58), Larry Hollenbeck (#62), Tim Sauter (#56), Mark Green (#26), Kevin Conway (#03), Justin Ashburn (#16), Keith Murt (#79), Matt Kenseth (#17), Jeff Kendall (#70), Shane Hall (#52), Kim Crosby (#24)

- This was Stewart's first Busch Series victory, becoming the ninth driver in NASCAR history to win a race in all three of its top series. He would also be the first of seven drivers to accomplish the feat in 2005.

=== Stater Brothers 300 ===
The Stater Brothers 300 was held on February 26 at California Speedway. Tony Stewart was the polesitter.

Top ten results

1. #9 - Mark Martin
2. #21 - Kevin Harvick
3. #32 - Shane Hmiel
4. #2 - Clint Bowyer
5. #41 - Reed Sorenson
6. #60 - Carl Edwards
7. #64 - Jamie McMurray
8. #14 - David Stremme
9. #17 - Matt Kenseth
10. #90 - Dale Jarrett

Failed to qualify: Eric Jones (#73), Kevin Conway (#03), Shane Hall (#52), John Hayden (#16), Kim Crosby (#24)

=== Telcel Motorola 200 ===
The inaugural Telcel Motorola 200 presented by Banamex was held on March 6 at Autódromo Hermanos Rodriguez. This race was the first NASCAR race held in Mexico. Mexican Jorge Goeters won the pole in his debut.

Top ten results

1. #8 - Martin Truex Jr.
2. #21 - Kevin Harvick
3. #60 - Carl Edwards
4. #32 - Shane Hmiel
5. #1 - Boris Said
6. #64 - Rusty Wallace
7. #2 - Clint Bowyer
8. #22 - Kenny Wallace
9. #25 - Ashton Lewis
10. #5 - Adrián Fernández

Failed to qualify: Paul Wolfe (#6), Jimmy Morales* (#67), Todd Souza (#97), Kim Crosby (#24), Mark Montgomery (#16), Alfredo Tame Jr. (#92), Stan Silva Jr. (#65)

- Jimmy Morales replaced Scott Gaylord in the #52 car in the race, after failing to qualify his #67.

=== Sam's Town 300 ===
The Sam's Town 300 was held on March 12 at Las Vegas Motor Speedway. Carl Edwards was the polesitter.

Top ten results

1. #9 - Mark Martin
2. #21 - Kevin Harvick
3. #14 - David Stremme
4. #87 - Joe Nemechek
5. #66 - Greg Biffle
6. #41 - Reed Sorenson
7. #60 - Carl Edwards
8. #34 - Randy LaJoie
9. #2 - Clint Bowyer
10. #27 - David Green

Failed to qualify: Michael Waltrip (#99), Ken Schrader (#67), Jerry Robertson (#78), Eric Jones (#73), John Hayden (#16), Jeff Fuller (#24), Shane Hall (#52), Damon Lusk (#85)

=== Aaron's 312 (Atlanta) ===
The Aaron's 312 was held on March 19 at Atlanta Motor Speedway. Carl Edwards was the polesitter.

Top ten results

1. #60 - Carl Edwards*
2. #33 - Tony Stewart
3. #48 - Jimmie Johnson
4. #17 - Matt Kenseth
5. #38 - Kasey Kahne
6. #66 - Greg Biffle
7. #99 - Michael Waltrip
8. #90 - Elliott Sadler
9. #64 - Jamie McMurray
10. #10 - Michel Jourdain Jr.

Failed to qualify: John Hayden (#16), Aaron Fike (#43), Stan Boyd (#52), Damon Lusk (#85), Blake Mallory (#24), Reed Sorenson (#41)*

- This was Edwards' first career Busch victory, which he would back up by scoring his first career Cup Series victory the next day.
- Reed Sorenson replaced Sterling Marlin in the #40 car in the race, after failing to qualify his #41.

=== Pepsi 300 ===
The Pepsi 300 was held on March 26 at Nashville Superspeedway. Reed Sorenson was the polesitter.

Top ten results

1. #41 - Reed Sorenson*
2. #22 - Kenny Wallace
3. #32 - Shane Hmiel
4. #60 - Carl Edwards
5. #2 - Clint Bowyer
6. #95 - Bobby Hamilton
7. #33 - Tony Raines
8. #35 - Jason Keller
9. #20 - Denny Hamlin
10. #59 - Stacy Compton

Failed to qualify: John Hayden (#16), Damon Lusk (#85), Shawna Robinson (#23), Brian Sockwell (#88), Blake Mallory (#24)

- This was Sorenson's first career victory.
- This race marked the NASCAR debut of Furniture Row Racing, who started 24th and finished 33rd with driver Jerry Robertson. The team previously failed to qualify for Las Vegas.

=== Sharpie Professional 250 ===
The Sharpie Professional 250 was held on April 4 at Bristol Motor Speedway. The race was scheduled to start on April 2, but was postponed due to persistent rain. Carl Edwards was the polesitter after qualifying was rained out.

Top ten results

1. #29 - Kevin Harvick
2. #21 - Jeff Burton
3. #41 - Reed Sorenson
4. #17 - Matt Kenseth
5. #40 - Sterling Marlin
6. #64 - Jeremy Mayfield
7. #60 - Carl Edwards
8. #25 - Ashton Lewis
9. #20 - Denny Hamlin
10. #66 - Greg Biffle

Failed to qualify: Brad Teague (#52), Justin Ashburn (#16), John Hayden (#85), Tim Sauter (#56), Jay Sauter (#75), Eric McClure (#04)

- The original Saturday broadcast was interrupted by a news report on the death of Pope John Paul II.
- Shane Hmiel, who finished 12th suffered a 25-point penalty after camera's caught him making an indecent gesture.

=== O'Reilly 300 ===
The O'Reilly 300 was held on April 16 at Texas Motor Speedway. Shane Hmiel was the polesitter.

Top ten results

1. #38 - Kasey Kahne
2. #66 - Greg Biffle
3. #41 - Reed Sorenson
4. #60 - Carl Edwards
5. #90 - Elliott Sadler
6. #2 - Clint Bowyer
7. #17 - Matt Kenseth
8. #47 - Jon Wood
9. #22 - Kenny Wallace
10. #32 - Shane Hmiel

Failed to qualify: Aaron Fike (#43), Mark Green (#7), Kyle Busch (#57), Shawna Robinson (#23)

- 9th place Johnny Sauter was DQ'ed in post-race inspection for multiple infractions, including an engine with 300 horsepower (220 kW) more.

=== Bashas' Supermarkets 200 ===
The Bashas' Supermarkets 200 was held on April 22 at Phoenix International Raceway. Kasey Kahne was the polesitter.

Top ten results

1. #66 - Greg Biffle
2. #90 - Elliott Sadler
3. #14 - David Stremme
4. #21 - Kevin Harvick
5. #33 - Tony Stewart
6. #87 - Joe Nemechek
7. #99 - Michael Waltrip
8. #60 - Carl Edwards
9. #8 - Martin Truex Jr.
10. #18 - J. J. Yeley

Failed to qualify: Derrike Cope* (#94), Ryan Hemphill (#4)

- Derrike Cope replaced Jimmy Kitchens in the #28 car in the race, after failing to qualify his #94.

=== Aaron's 312 (Talladega) ===
The Aaron's 312 was held on April 30 at Talladega Superspeedway. Paul Menard was the polesitter.

Top ten results

1. #8 - Martin Truex Jr.
2. #47 - Jon Wood
3. #14 - David Stremme
4. #25 - Ashton Lewis
5. #98 - Kerry Earnhardt
6. #34 - Randy LaJoie
7. #44 - Justin Labonte
8. #35 - Jason Keller
9. #58 - Brent Sherman
10. #0 - Kertus Davis

Failed to qualify: Greg Sacks (#7), Ryan Hemphill (#4), Geoff Bodine (#72), Donnie Neuenberger (#52)

- This event was marred by several race-stoppages for rain and large accidents, causing it to end near darkness. It was the first time in Busch Series history a race had ended on prime-time network television, as the checkered flag waved at 8:20 p.m. EDT.

=== Diamond Hill Plywood 200 ===
The Diamond Hill Plywood 200 was held on May 6 at Darlington Raceway. Jimmie Johnson was the polesitter.

Top ten results

1. #17 - Matt Kenseth
2. #22 - Kenny Wallace
3. #8 - Martin Truex Jr.
4. #66 - Greg Biffle
5. #21 - Jeff Burton
6. #14 - David Stremme
7. #20 - Denny Hamlin
8. #6 - Jeremy Mayfield
9. #33 - Tony Raines
10. #2 - Clint Bowyer

Failed to qualify: Eric McClure (#52)

=== Funai 250 ===
The Funai 250 was held on May 13 at Richmond International Raceway. Kasey Kahne was the polesitter.

Top ten results

1. #60 - Carl Edwards
2. #90 - Elliott Sadler
3. #1 - Johnny Sauter
4. #79 - Kasey Kahne
5. #66 - Greg Biffle
6. #4 - Jeff Green
7. #9 - Mark Martin
8. #17 - Matt Kenseth
9. #2 - Clint Bowyer
10. #40 - Sterling Marlin

Failed to qualify: Kertus Davis (#0), Brent Sherman (#58), Eric McClure (#52), Jeff Fuller (#7), Geoff Bodine (#72)

=== Carquest Auto Parts 300 ===
The Carquest Auto Parts 300 was held on May 28 at Lowe's Motor Speedway. Kasey Kahne was the polesitter.

Top ten results

1. #5 - Kyle Busch
2. #40 - Sterling Marlin
3. #39 - Ryan Newman
4. #66 - Greg Biffle
5. #41 - Reed Sorenson
6. #19 - Bobby Labonte
7. #8 - Martin Truex Jr.
8. #14 - David Stremme
9. #22 - Kenny Wallace
10. #25 - Ashton Lewis

Failed to qualify: Scott Riggs (#30), Jeff Fuller (#7), Todd Bodine (#43), Eric McClure (#52), Kevin Lepage (#72), Brian Sockwell (#88), Robert Pressley (#46)

- Shane Hmiel made his final career NASCAR start in this race, finishing in last place after crashing out early. After this race, Hmiel would be suspended by NASCAR after failing a drug test. Hmiel would later be banned from NASCAR for life after failing another drug test in 2006.

=== MBNA RacePoints 200 ===
The MBNA RacePoints 200 was held on June 4 at Dover International Speedway. Carl Edwards was the polesitter.

Top ten results

1. #8 - Martin Truex Jr.
2. #41 - Reed Sorenson
3. #64 - Jamie McMurray
4. #90 - Dale Jarrett
5. #5 - Jimmie Johnson
6. #33 - Tony Raines
7. #35 - Jason Keller
8. #66 - Greg Biffle
9. #22 - Kenny Wallace
10. #87 - Joe Nemechek

Failed to qualify: Matt Kenseth (#17)

=== Federated Auto Parts 300 ===
The Federated Auto Parts 300 was held on June 12 at Nashville Superspeedway. Qualifying and the race were rained out when attempted on June 11, the order determined by owner points (not driver points).

Top ten results

1. #2 - Clint Bowyer*
2. #22 - Kenny Wallace
3. #41 - Reed Sorenson
4. #33 - Tony Raines
5. #8 - Martin Truex Jr.
6. #14 - David Stremme
7. #20 - Denny Hamlin
8. #18 - J. J. Yeley
9. #1 - Johnny Sauter
10. #6 - Paul Wolfe

Failed to qualify: Justin Ashburn (#16), Eddie Beahr (#94), Johnny Borneman III (#83), Travis Kittleson (#68), Burney Lamar (#83), Brad Teague (#53)

- This was Bowyer's first career Busch Series victory.
- Rain forced this race to be held on the same day as the Cup Series race at Richmond. As a result, Cup drivers Carl Edwards and Sterling Marlin, who were originally entered, were unable to participate. Johnny Benson drove Marlin's #40 car, while Hank Parker Jr. drove Edwards' #60 car. Martin Truex Jr. started first when the green flag waved per NASCAR rules.

=== Meijer 300 presented by Oreo ===
The Meijer 300 was held on June 18 at Kentucky Speedway. Carl Edwards was the polesitter.

Top ten results

1. #60 - Carl Edwards
2. #8 - Martin Truex Jr.
3. #2 - Clint Bowyer
4. #41 - Reed Sorenson
5. #11 - Paul Menard
6. #40 - Sterling Marlin
7. #18 - J. J. Yeley
8. #59 - Stacy Compton
9. #6 - Casey Atwood
10. #47 - Jon Wood

Failed to qualify: Kenny Hendrick (#03), Johnny Borneman III (#83), Damon Lusk (#85), Jerry Robertson (#78), Brad Teague (#52)

=== SBC 250 ===
The SBC 250 was held on June 25 at The Milwaukee Mile. Johnny Sauter was the polesitter. this race would end after 200 laps due to rain.

Top ten results

1. #1 - Johnny Sauter
2. #8 - Martin Truex Jr.*
3. #11 - Paul Menard
4. #18 - J. J. Yeley
5. #14 - David Stremme
6. #20 - Denny Hamlin
7. #34 - Randy LaJoie
8. #22 - Kenny Wallace
9. #33 - Tony Raines
10. #2 - Clint Bowyer

Failed to qualify: Chad Beahr (#94), Todd Shafer (#91)

- Martin Truex Jr. took the championship points lead from Reed Sorenson in this race, and would hold it for the rest of the season.

=== Winn-Dixie 250 presented by PepsiCo ===
The Winn-Dixie 250 presented by PepsiCo was held on July 1 at Daytona International Speedway. Kevin Harvick was the polesitter.

Top ten results

1. #8 - Martin Truex Jr.
2. #21 - Kevin Harvick
3. #66 - Greg Biffle
4. #22 - Kenny Wallace
5. #2 - Clint Bowyer
6. #11 - Paul Menard
7. #87 - Joe Nemechek
8. #6 - Mike Wallace
9. #32 - Jason Leffler
10. #33 - Tony Raines

Failed to qualify: Mark Green (#23), Jeff Fuller (#7), Donnie Neuenberger (#52), Derrike Cope (#28)

=== USG Durock 300 ===
The USG Durock 300 was held on July 9 at Chicagoland Speedway. Ryan Newman was the polesitter.

Top ten results

1. #21 - Kevin Harvick
2. #66 - Greg Biffle
3. #39 - Ryan Newman
4. #60 - Carl Edwards
5. #9 - Mark Martin
6. #2 - Clint Bowyer
7. #8 - Martin Truex Jr.
8. #17 - Matt Kenseth
9. #11 - Paul Menard
10. #41 - Reed Sorenson

Failed to qualify: Kertus Davis (#0), Michel Jourdain Jr. (#10), Tim Sauter (#56), Eric McClure (#52), Mark Green (#23), Kerry Earnhardt (#73), Kim Crosby (#26), Wade Day (#72), Chris Horn (#80), Jeff Fuller (#7)

=== New England 200 ===
The New England 200 was held on July 16 at New Hampshire International Speedway. Kevin Harvick was the polesitter.

Top ten results

1. #8 - Martin Truex Jr.
2. #60 - Carl Edwards
3. #20 - Denny Hamlin
4. #90 - Elliott Sadler
5. #64 - Jamie McMurray
6. #18 - J. J. Yeley
7. #11 - Paul Menard
8. #21 - Kevin Harvick
9. #17 - Matt Kenseth
10. #36 - Stanton Barrett

Failed to qualify: Derrike Cope (#28), Eric McClure (#52), Kim Crosby (#26)

=== ITT Industries & Goulds Pumps Salute to the Troops 250 ===
The ITT Industries & Goulds Pumps Salute to the Troops 250 was held on July 23 at Pikes Peak International Raceway. Clint Bowyer was the polesitter.

Top ten results

1. #27 - David Green*
2. #2 - Clint Bowyer
3. #22 - Kenny Wallace
4. #8 - Martin Truex Jr.
5. #18 - J. J. Yeley
6. #64 - Bill Elliott
7. #41 - Reed Sorenson
8. #43 - Aaron Fike
9. #59 - Stacy Compton
10. #21 - Brandon Miller

Failed to qualify: Brad Teague (#24), Dale Quarterley (#72)*, Clint Vahsholtz (#90), Jennifer Jo Cobb (#73)

- This was David Green’s final Busch Series victory, and the last for Brewco Motorsports.
- This was the final NASCAR race to be held at Pikes Peak before its closing at the end of the season.
- Dale Quarterley replaced Randy MacDonald in the #71 car in the race, after failing to qualify his #72.

=== Wallace Family Tribute 250 ===
The Wallace Family Tribute 250 presented by Shop 'n Save was held on July 30 at Gateway International Raceway. Martin Truex Jr. was the polesitter.

Top ten results

1. #41 - Reed Sorenson
2. #6 - Mike Wallace
3. #60 - Carl Edwards
4. #27 - David Green
5. #11 - Paul Menard
6. #21 - Brandon Miller
7. #1 - Johnny Sauter
8. #2 - Clint Bowyer
9. #18 - J. J. Yeley
10. #33 - Tony Raines

Failed to qualify: Jimmy Spencer (#73), A. J. Fike (#43), John Hayden (#85), Kim Crosby (#26), Eric McClure (#52)

=== Kroger 200 ===
The Kroger 200 was held on August 6 at Indianapolis Raceway Park. Reed Sorenson was the polesitter.

Top ten results

1. #8 - Martin Truex Jr.
2. #2 - Clint Bowyer
3. #41 - Reed Sorenson
4. #35 - Jason Keller
5. #14 - David Stremme
6. #20 - Denny Hamlin
7. #11 - Paul Menard
8. #27 - David Green
9. #1 - Johnny Sauter
10. #64 - Mike Wallace

Failed to qualify: Wayne Edwards (#9), Brad Teague (#53), Kim Crosby (#26), Todd Shafer (#91), John Hayden (#85)

=== Zippo 200 ===
The Zippo 200 was held on August 13 at Watkins Glen International. Tony Stewart was the polesitter.

Top ten results

1. #39 - Ryan Newman
2. #55 - Robby Gordon
3. #57 - Brian Vickers
4. #33 - Tony Stewart
5. #8 - Martin Truex Jr.
6. #21 - Jeff Burton
7. #87 - Joe Nemechek
8. #11 - Paul Menard
9. #32 - Jorge Goeters
10. #18 - J. J. Yeley

Failed to qualify: Stan Silva Jr. (#65), Todd Souza (#97), Mark Green (#23), Paul Bonacorsi (#72), Elliott Sadler (#08), Scott Turner (#52), Joe Fox (#0), Kerry Earnhardt (#73), Jeff Spraker (#63), Kim Crosby (#26)

- This was the first Busch Series race held at Watkins Glen since 2001.

=== Domino's Pizza 250 ===
The Domino's Pizza 250 was held on August 20 at Michigan International Speedway. Martin Truex Jr. was the polesitter.

Top ten results

1. #39 - Ryan Newman
2. #66 - Greg Biffle
3. #60 - Carl Edwards
4. #8 - Martin Truex Jr.
5. #18 - J. J. Yeley
6. #11 - Paul Menard
7. #19 - Bobby Labonte
8. #20 - Denny Hamlin
9. #90 - Elliott Sadler
10. #1 - Johnny Sauter

Failed to qualify: Kim Crosby (#26), Eric McClure (#52), Tim Sauter (#56), Jerry Robertson (#78), Jamie Mosley (#28), Brian Vickers (#57)

- Jeremy Mayfield, who finished 23rd, was penalized 25 points for an unapproved adjustment found on his car during post-race inspection.

=== Food City 250 ===
The Food City 250 was held on August 26 at Bristol Motor Speedway. Ryan Newman won his third straight Busch Series race. Kyle Busch was the polesitter.

Top ten results

1. #39 - Ryan Newman
2. #66 - Greg Biffle
3. #21 - Kevin Harvick
4. #2 - Clint Bowyer
5. #1 - Johnny Sauter
6. #8 - Martin Truex Jr.
7. #81 - Dale Earnhardt Jr.
8. #64 - Jamie McMurray
9. #33 - Tony Raines
10. #19 - Bobby Labonte

Failed to qualify: Ron Hornaday Jr. (#30), Jeff Fuller (#7), Eric McClure (#04), Kevin Lepage (#72), Ron Young (#71), Brent Sherman (#10), Brad Teague (#52), John Hayden (#85), Tim Sauter (#56), David Ragan (#16)

- Reed Sorenson, who finished 12th, suffered a 50-point penalty for a tire violation.
- Pontiac made its last Busch Series start in this race.

=== Ameriquest 300 ===
The Ameriquest 300 was held on September 3 at California Speedway. Clint Bowyer was the polesitter.

Top ten results

1. #60 - Carl Edwards
2. #66 - Greg Biffle
3. #2 - Clint Bowyer
4. #1 - Johnny Sauter
5. #6 - Kasey Kahne
6. #35 - Jason Keller
7. #32 - Jason Leffler
8. #22 - Kenny Wallace
9. #14 - David Stremme
10. #11 - Paul Menard

Failed to qualify: Kevin Lepage (#72), Derrike Cope (#28), Jeff Fuller (#7), Michael Waltrip (#99), Mark Green (#23), Kim Crosby (#26)

- This was the first Busch Series race to be televised live in its entirety in prime-time television, with the NBC broadcast beginning at 8:30 p.m. EDT.

=== Emerson Radio 250 ===
The Emerson Radio 250 was held on September 9 at Richmond International Raceway. Mark Martin was the polesitter.

Top ten results

1. #21 - Kevin Harvick
2. #11 - Paul Menard
3. #17 - Matt Kenseth
4. #9 - Mark Martin
5. #32 - Jason Leffler
6. #90 - Elliott Sadler
7. #41 - Reed Sorenson
8. #19 - Bobby Labonte
9. #99 - Michael Waltrip
10. #66 - Greg Biffle

Failed to qualify: Mark Green (#23), Kevin Lepage (#85), Tim Sauter (#56), Kertus Davis (#0), Brent Sherman (#10), Jason York (#72), Brian Sockwell (#88), Eddie Beahr (#94), Jerry Robertson (#78)

- Points leader Martin Truex Jr. was involved in a bizarre incident with Mike Wallace on lap 203, which saw Truex's car slide along the backstretch on the left side of the car.
- Truex, who finished 27th, suffered a 25-point penalty for making an inappropriate gesture.

=== Dover 200 ===
The Dover 200 was held on September 24 at Dover International Speedway. Ryan Newman was the polesitter.

Top ten results

1. #39 - Ryan Newman
2. #2 - Clint Bowyer
3. #32 - Jason Leffler
4. #41 - Reed Sorenson
5. #66 - Greg Biffle
6. #20 - Denny Hamlin
7. #64 - Rusty Wallace
8. #57 - Brian Vickers
9. #60 - Carl Edwards
10. #11 - Paul Menard

Failed to qualify: Dale Quarterley (#71), Brent Sherman (#10), Derrike Cope (#94), Bryan Reffner (#67), Jerick Johnson (#76)

- This race was marred by a large 13-car pileup on lap 1, which saw Donnie Neuenberger flip over once. No one was injured.

=== United Way 300 ===
The United Way 300 was held on October 8 at Kansas Speedway. Martin Truex Jr. was the polesitter.

Top ten results

1. #6 - Kasey Kahne
2. #66 - Greg Biffle
3. #1 - Johnny Sauter
4. #21 - Kevin Harvick
5. #47 - Jon Wood
6. #41 - Reed Sorenson
7. #17 - Matt Kenseth
8. #5 - Kyle Busch
9. #8 - Martin Truex Jr.
10. #18 - J. J. Yeley

Failed to qualify: Jorge Goeters (#73), Kertus Davis (#0), Mark Green (#23), Michael Waltrip (#99), Jamie Mosley (#28), Tim Sauter (#56), Kevin Lepage (#72), Derrike Cope (#71), Kim Crosby (#26), Chris Horn (#80), Chad Blount (#70)

=== Dollar General 300 ===
The Dollar General 300 was held on October 14 at Lowe's Motor Speedway. Jimmie Johnson was the polesitter.

Top ten results

1. #39 - Ryan Newman
2. #90 - Elliott Sadler
3. #11 - Paul Menard
4. #60 - Carl Edwards
5. #40 - Sterling Marlin
6. #32 - Jason Leffler
7. #47 - Jon Wood
8. #25 - Ashton Lewis
9. #72 - Kevin Lepage
10. #44 - Justin Labonte

Failed to qualify: Kertus Davis (#0), Michel Jourdain Jr. (#15), Michael Waltrip (#99), Steve Grissom (#49), Mark Green (#23), Johnny Benson (#67), Kim Crosby (#26)

=== Sam's Town 250 ===
The Sam's Town 250 was held on October 22 at Memphis Motorsports Park. Martin Truex Jr. was the polesitter.

Top ten results

1. #2 - Clint Bowyer
2. #18 - J. J. Yeley
3. #8 - Martin Truex Jr.
4. #27 - David Green
5. #60 - Carl Edwards
6. #11 - Paul Menard
7. #20 - Denny Hamlin
8. #33 - Tony Raines
9. #1 - Johnny Sauter
10. #35 - Jason Keller

Failed to qualify: Marc Mitchell (#86), Eric McClure (#04), Mark Green (#23), Travis Geisler (#72), Charlie Bradberry (#92), Kerry Earnhardt (#99), Brian Tyler (#80), Mike Harmon (#24), Justin Ashburn (#16), Brad Teague (#91)

=== O'Reilly Challenge ===
The inaugural O'Reilly Challenge was held on November 5 at Texas Motor Speedway. Ryan Newman was the polesitter.

Top ten results

1. #21 - Kevin Harvick
2. #66 - Greg Biffle
3. #60 - Carl Edwards
4. #41 - Reed Sorenson
5. #5 - Kyle Busch
6. #17 - Matt Kenseth
7. #2 - Clint Bowyer
8. #32 - Jason Leffler
9. #90 - Elliott Sadler
10. #1 - Johnny Sauter

Failed to qualify: Michael Waltrip (#99), Kevin Lepage (#72), Ron Hornaday Jr. (#30), Eric McClure (#0), Chad Blount (#70), Jeff Fuller (#7), Chris Wimmer (#23), Jorge Goeters (#73), Steve Grissom (#49), Brent Sherman (#10), Tracy Hines (#92)

=== Arizona 200 ===
The Arizona 200 was held on November 12 at Phoenix International Raceway. Carl Edwards was the polesitter.

Top ten results

1. #60 - Carl Edwards
2. #2 - Clint Bowyer
3. #17 - Matt Kenseth
4. #21 - Kevin Harvick
5. #66 - Greg Biffle
6. #8 - Martin Truex Jr.*
7. #32 - Jason Leffler
8. #41 - Reed Sorenson
9. #20 - Denny Hamlin
10. #18 - J. J. Yeley

Failed to qualify: Bobby Labonte (#19), Eric McClure (#04), Charlie Bradberry (#91)

- Martin Truex Jr. finished the race with a 64-point lead over Clint Bowyer, who is the only other driver in contention for the series championship. Truex would need to finish 12th or better at Homestead to win the championship, regardless of where Bowyer finishes.

=== Ford 300 ===
The Ford 300 was held on November 19 at Homestead-Miami Speedway. Ryan Newman was the polesitter.

Top ten results

1. #39 - Ryan Newman
2. #66 - Greg Biffle
3. #9 - Mark Martin
4. #21 - Kevin Harvick
5. #11 - Paul Menard
6. #47 - Jon Wood
7. #8 - Martin Truex Jr.*
8. #2 - Clint Bowyer
9. #27 - David Green
10. #87 - Joe Nemechek

Failed to qualify: Jerry Robertson (#78), Michael Waltrip (#99), Dave Blaney (#31), Jamie McMurray (#09), Kevin Lepage (#72), John Andretti (#10), Travis Kittleson (#68), Steve Grissom (#49), Chris Wimmer (#23), Marc Mitchell (#86)

- By finishing ahead of Clint Bowyer, Martin Truex Jr. won the Busch Series championship for the second consecutive year, becoming the first driver to win it back-to-back since Dale Earnhardt Jr. in 1998 and '99. Truex would also be the last Busch Series regular to become the champion until Ricky Stenhouse Jr. in 2011, as the next five Busch Series championships would be won by full-time Cup Series drivers.
- JR Motorsports made its NASCAR debut in this race, with Mark McFarland driving the #88 U.S. Navy Chevrolet. McFarland started 18th and finished 20th. This would be the only race to feature both Chance 2 Motorsports and JR Motorsports, which are both owned by Dale Earnhardt Jr..

== Results and standings ==
=== Race results ===
No.	Race	Pole position	Most laps led	Winning driver	Manufacturer	No.	Team
1	Hershey's Take 5 300	Joe Nemechek	Tony Stewart	Tony Stewart	Chevrolet	33	Kevin Harvick, Inc.
2	Stater Brothers 300	Tony Stewart	Mark Martin	Mark Martin	Ford	9	Roush Racing
3	Telcel Motorola 200 presented by Banamex	Jorge Goeters	Martin Truex Jr.	Martin Truex Jr.	Chevrolet	8	Chance 2 Motorsports
4	Sam's Town 300	Carl Edwards	Carl Edwards	Mark Martin	Ford	9	Roush Racing
5	Aaron's 312	Carl Edwards	Jimmie Johnson	Carl Edwards	Ford	60	Roush Racing
6	Pepsi 300	Reed Sorenson	Reed Sorenson	Reed Sorenson	Dodge	41	Chip Ganassi Racing
7	Sharpie Professional 250	Carl Edwards	Jeff Burton	Kevin Harvick	Chevrolet	29	Richard Childress Racing
8	O'Reilly 300	Shane Hmiel	Kasey Kahne	Kasey Kahne	Dodge	38	Akins Motorsports
9	Bashas' Supermarkets 200	Kasey Kahne	Greg Biffle	Greg Biffle	Ford	66	Brewco Motorsports
10	Aaron's 312	Paul Menard	Martin Truex Jr.	Martin Truex Jr.	Chevrolet	8	Chance 2 Motorsports
11	Diamond Hill Plywood 200	Jimmie Johnson	Matt Kenseth	Matt Kenseth	Ford	17	Roush Racing
12	Funai 250	Kasey Kahne	Clint Bowyer	Carl Edwards	Ford	60	Roush Racing
13	CarQuest Auto Parts 300	Kasey Kahne	Kyle Busch	Kyle Busch	Chevrolet	5	Hendrick Motorsports
14	MBNA RacePoints 200	Carl Edwards	Kevin Harvick	Martin Truex Jr.	Chevrolet	8	Chance 2 Motorsports
15	Federated Auto Parts 300	Hank Parker Jr.	Martin Truex Jr.	Clint Bowyer	Chevrolet	2	Richard Childress Racing
16	Meijer 300 presented by Oreo	Carl Edwards	Carl Edwards	Carl Edwards	Ford	60	Roush Racing
17	SBC 250	Johnny Sauter	Johnny Sauter	Johnny Sauter	Dodge	1	Phoenix Racing
18	Winn-Dixie 250 presented by PepsiCo	Kevin Harvick	Martin Truex Jr.	Martin Truex Jr.	Chevrolet	8	Chance 2 Motorsports
19	USG Durock 300	Ryan Newman	Ryan Newman	Kevin Harvick	Chevrolet	21	Richard Childress Racing
20	New England 200	Kevin Harvick	Kevin Harvick	Martin Truex Jr.	Chevrolet	8	Chance 2 Motorsports
21	ITT Industries & Goulds Pumps Salute to the Troops 250	Clint Bowyer	Clint Bowyer	David Green	Ford	27	Brewco Motorsports
22	Wallace Family Tribute 250 presented by Shop 'n Save	Martin Truex Jr.	Reed Sorenson	Reed Sorenson	Dodge	41	Chip Ganassi Racing
23	Kroger 200	Reed Sorenson	Martin Truex Jr.	Martin Truex Jr.	Chevrolet	8	Chance 2 Motorsports
24	Zippo 200	Tony Stewart	Brian Vickers	Ryan Newman	Dodge	39	Penske Racing
25	Domino's Pizza 250	Martin Truex Jr.	Clint Bowyer	Ryan Newman	Dodge	39	Penske Racing
26	Food City 250	Kyle Busch	Ryan Newman	Ryan Newman	Dodge	39	Penske Racing
27	Ameriquest 300	Clint Bowyer	Greg Biffle	Carl Edwards	Ford	60	Roush Racing
28	Emerson Radio 250	Mark Martin	Kevin Harvick	Kevin Harvick	Chevrolet	21	Richard Childress Racing
29	Dover 200	Ryan Newman	Ryan Newman	Ryan Newman	Dodge	39	Penske Racing
30	United Way 300	Martin Truex Jr.	Greg Biffle	Kasey Kahne	Dodge	6	Evernham Motorsports
31	Dollar General 300	Jimmie Johnson	Ryan Newman	Ryan Newman	Dodge	39	Penske Racing
32	Sam's Town 250	Martin Truex Jr.	Clint Bowyer	Clint Bowyer	Chevrolet	2	Richard Childress Racing
33	O'Reilly Challenge	Ryan Newman	Ryan Newman	Kevin Harvick	Chevrolet	21	Richard Childress Racing
34	Arizona 200	Carl Edwards	Carl Edwards	Carl Edwards	Ford	60	Roush Racing
35	Ford 300	Ryan Newman	Greg Biffle	Ryan Newman	Dodge	39	Penske Racing

=== Drivers' championship ===
(key) Bold – Pole position awarded by time. Italics – Pole position set by owner's points. * – Most laps led.

Pos	Driver	DAY	CAL	MXC	LVS	ATL	NSH	BRI	TEX	PHO	TAL	DAR	RCH	CLT	DOV	NSH	KEN	MIL	DAY	CHI	NHA	PPR	GTY	IRP	GLN	MCH	BRI	CAL	RCH	DOV	KAN	CLT	MEM	TEX	PHO	HOM	Pts
1	Martin Truex Jr.	4	30	1*	16	11	14	31	35	9	1*	3	38	7	1	5*	2	2	1*	7	1	4	**26**	1*	5	4	6	15	27	12	**9**	11	**3**	11	6	7	4937
2	Clint Bowyer	12	4	7	9	21	5	13	6	13	19	10	9*	32	19	1	3	10	5	6	16	**2***	8	2	15	30*	4	**3**	11	2	16	33	1*	7	2	8	4869
3	Carl Edwards **(R)**	10	6	3	**7***	**1**	4	7	4	8	33	11	1	35	**31**	QL	**1***	14	36	4	2	34	3	20	11	3	29	1	28	9	27	4	5	3	**1***	19	4601
4	Reed Sorenson **(R)**	9	5	14	6	19	**1***	3	3	32	32	12	31	5	2	3	4	12	20	10	14	7	1*	**3**	41	36	11	12	6	4	7	35	33	4	8	33	4453
5	Denny Hamlin **(R)**	33	18	15	12	16	9	9	14	11	28	7	13	20	24	7	15	6	14	15	3	14	11	6	33	8	13	20	34	6	12	30	7	19	9	37	4143
6	Paul Menard	17	20	34	37	24	36	22	18	15	**27**	30	36	12	28	13	5	3	6	9	7	12	5	7	8	6	41	10	2	10	36	3	6	17	13	5	4101
7	Kenny Wallace	37	13	8	23	12	2	14	9	16	35	2	20	9	9	2	14	8	4	29	11	3	24	11	28	18	35	8	31	11	24	26	18	20	14	29	4068
8	David Green	22	14	39	10	33	18	15	11	14	13	15	14	31	11	33	12	11	12	30	20	1	4	8	22	21	27	18	18	32	15	38	4	15	12	9	3908
9	Jason Keller	35	17	13	43	17	8	19	13	21	8	13	11	23	7	11	31	13	17	22	21	36	33	4	18	15	12	6	38	13	18	18	10	13	16	15	3866
10	Greg Biffle	8	40		5	6		10	2	1*	36	4	5	4	8		30		3	2	31				12	2	2	2*	10	5	2*	36		2	5	2*	3865
11	J. J. Yeley	20	23	42	18	34	38	21	22	10	38	20	24	27	18	8	7	4	42	18	6	5	9	13	10	5	30	43	19	20	10	22	2	25	10	28	3711
12	Johnny Sauter	41	24	11	28	20	16	18	43	24	41	17	3	18	35	9	38	**1***	16	27	18	32	7	9	43	10	5	4	12	39	3	42	9	10	11	11	3695
13	David Stremme	40	8	22	3	13	27	38	17	3	3	6	27	8	33	6	32	5	18	20	22	35	22	5	17	22	26	9	35	19	43	23	11	18	34	32	3694
14	Ashton Lewis	13	11	9	22	14	19	8	32	17	4	14	16	10	14	25	25	18	26	11	28	15	36	15	31	26	31	31	30	14	28	8	31	21	21	43	3587
15	Jon Wood **(R)**	31	28	16	17	25	12	11	8	18	2	35	35	33	40	32	10	26	29	37	37	22	21	34	20	19	37	14	17	16	5	7	40	26	33	6	3346
16	Stacy Compton	23	16	28	38	41	10	16	23	19	25	31	39	26	15	16	8	25	13	28	33	9	20	12	27	28	15	32	16	18	29	20	22	37	17	17	3345
17	Justin Labonte	18	19	25	13	42	13	40	33	20	7	18	43	22	23	29	11	16	34	41	41	13	13	22	16	17	23	36	22	26	25	10	12	24	22	21	3285
18	Kevin Harvick	2	2	2	2			1		4	18		12	11	29*				**2**	1	**8***					13	3		1*		4	24		1	4	4	3259
19	Randy LaJoie	19	31	32	8	15	28	27	26	35	6	26	26	28	17	24	21	7	30	31	39	16	14	17	21	41	17	21	15	42			25		25		2886
20	Tony Raines				33		7	17				9			6	4	13	9	10	19	32	11	10			11	9	26	13	15	17	37	8	14	19		2736
21	Kasey Kahne	5			20	5	15		1*	**28**	31	34	**4**	**41**	13				25	12	12				13	27	19	5			1	12		38		39	2511
22	Stanton Barrett	29	33	19	26	26	39	37	24	12	23	16	19	21	22	26	17	21	35	26	10	19	39	36	38	38	42	41	42								2252
23	Steve Grissom	28	37		41	40	24	24	29	27	16	36	32	40	30	39	27	38	23	43	30	33	34	27	30	35	36	40	25	28	32	DNQ	37	DNQ	38	DNQ	2071
24	Matt Kenseth	DNQ	9			4		4	7			1*	8		DNQ					8	9								3	38	7	25		6	3	36	2049
25	Joe Nemechek	**14**	12		4			41	12	6	29			19	10				7	13					7	25		17			11			23		10	2030
26	Brent Sherman **(R)**	DNQ	32	23	32	31	23	36	34	24	9	32	DNQ	34						24	23	27	30	18	29	29	DNQ	24	DNQ	DNQ	22	13	27	DNQ	26	31	2015
27	Aaron Fike				27	DNQ	35		DNQ		22		30		26	38	18	20	38	42	24	8	31	19		34		37	23	23	26	14	35	29	20	16	2010
28	Elliott Sadler			18	14	8			5	2			2	36						33	4				DNQ	9		13	6		42	2		9		18	2007
29	Sterling Marlin	42	15		25	QL	37	5	19		21	39	10	2		QL	6		41	35			12			12	25			17		5		22			1985
30	Jason Leffler																		9	23	29		18			14	20	7	5	3	19	6	24	8	7	27	1829
31	Kertus Davis **(R)**	34	42		42	28	32	26	40	25	10	33	DNQ	37	27	36	26	39	21	DNQ	38	41	40	30		42	33	35	DNQ	DNQ	25	DNQ	28	40	31	41	1804
32	Tim Fedewa	24	21	21	15	38	26	25	16	41	37	19	41	29	34	21	40	27	24	32	13	18															1737
33	Regan Smith														20	15	41	29	19	40	15	21	15	35	19	20	32	19	36	21	40	28	23	33	24		1693
34	Ryan Newman													3						**3***					1	1	1*			**1***		1*		**16***		**1**	1595
35	Michael Waltrip	7	38		DNQ	7		42	15	7	34		34	16			42			14			16		40	16	24	DNQ	9	40	DNQ	DNQ		DNQ		DNQ	1587
36	Jamie McMurray		7	33		9	11		28	36		40	33		3						5				26		8		37			16		42	18	DNQ	1584
37	Michel Jourdain Jr. **(R)**	25	25	37	40	10	22	32	20	37	30	41	21	15	41	40	23	30	39	DNQ								25			30	DNQ					1517
38	Mark Green	DNQ					40	23	DNQ	22	11	22	22	25	32	41	33	28	DNQ	DNQ	27	20	38	21	DNQ	33	28	DNQ	DNQ	41	DNQ	DNQ	DNQ				1423
39	Tony Stewart	1*	**29**			2			42	5	20		15	39										23	**4**				40			21					1317
40	Mike Wallace	15						34			39								8				2	10			14	29	26	31	21					12	1255
41	Tyler Walker		39	24			17	35		42			28	14	43	19	19	40			19	23	17	37	36												1252
42	Shane Hmiel	39	3	4	36	39	3	12	**10**	33	43	24	17	43																							1228
43	Mark Martin		1*		1				31				7							5									**4**		14					3	1212
44	Kyle Busch	32			11				DNQ		40		23	1*	36				27	36							**38**		14	37	8	41		5			1206
45	Kevin Hamlin																					17	23	26		31	22	42	20	34	31	15	14	28	23	35	1204
46	Jeremy Mayfield	21			24	22		6	27		42	8		38					11	39						23		27				29					1151
47	Jeff Green						20	20				28	6	17	38				15	38	17						18										984
48	Brandon Miller					32	25		36							43	16	24				10	6	39				23					20		39		977
49	Tim Sauter	DNQ					34	DNQ			12		18			27	20	37		DNQ		25	27	40		DNQ	DNQ		DNQ	30	DNQ		38			30	942
50	Derrike Cope	16	34		34	29	29	43	21	29		37	29	42		35		33	DNQ		DNQ						39	DNQ		DNQ	DNQ						932
51	Jeff Fuller	43	43		DNQ							38	DNQ	DNQ	25	30	35	41	DNQ	DNQ	42	31	35	42		39	DNQ	DNQ	43	24	34	27	42	DNQ			929
52	Paul Wolfe **(R)**	26	26	DNQ	30								37		16	10							29	38	23	32			29								906
53	Jimmie Johnson					3*						**23**	25	30	5					17								11				**43**					876
54	Ryan Hemphill **(R)**	36	27	17	29	30	31	33	41	DNQ	DNQ					12	28	23																			872
55	Bobby Labonte													6						16						7	10		8		37			12	DNQ		866
56	Dave Blaney				19								42	24	12					25	35								21		20			31		DNQ	780
57	Ron Hornaday Jr.			12		43									37	14		15						14			DNQ	34						DNQ	32		706
58	Jeff Burton							2*				5													6			16		27							692
59	Bill Elliott															23		17				6				24						17	16				674
60	Brian Vickers											43		13					31						3*	DNQ				8						23	654
61	Rusty Wallace			6													24						37							7	13			27			650
62	Jerry Robertson				DNQ		33		25	25			40			37	DNQ			34		29				DNQ		22	DNQ		39			35		DNQ	603
63	Bobby Hamilton	11				18	6					27				22																					568
64	Kevin Lepage										17			DNQ												37	DNQ	DNQ	DNQ	29	DNQ	9		DNQ	27	DNQ	557
65	Boston Reid **(R)**		22				30			39						17					36		25	28													555
66	Geoff Bodine					37	21	29	38	34	DNQ		DNQ		21	31																					545
67	Joel Kauffman																							25			34			36	23		34		29	22	532
68	A. J. Fike	30								30						28		32				30	DNQ	33									21				529
69	T. J. Bell																											38	24	22	35	34	41	34	36		517
70	Dale Jarrett		10					30				21			4										39												513
71	Robert Pressley											25		DNQ										16			16		33					30			455
72	Eric McClure						41	DNQ	30	38		DNQ	DNQ	DNQ		34		34	32	DNQ	DNQ	40	DNQ			DNQ	DNQ	39					DNQ	DNQ	DNQ		440
73	Blake Feese					23		28	37								34					37		29													414
74	Adrián Fernández			10																								28				40		43	28	42	411
75	Dale Earnhardt Jr.	3																	40								7					39					410
76	Casey Atwood																9			21	26	26															408
77	Carlos Contreras			36																					32			33			38				30	25	396
78	Robby Gordon	6		40																					2							31					395
79	Shawna Robinson	27	35	30	31	36	DNQ	39	DNQ																												384
80	Todd Bodine													DNQ													21				33	32		32		40	341
81	Scott Lagasse Jr.									40					42			22			40	28															299
82	Jorge Goeters			**38**																		24			9						DNQ			DNQ			283
83	Shane Hall	DNQ	DNQ		DNQ																	43	42	43					41	33			43		41		283
84	Ryan Moore																				34								32							13	252
85	Tracy Hines		36															19						24										DNQ			252
86	Stephen Leicht																																13		15		242
87	A. J. Foyt IV																																32	39	42	24	241
88	Johnny Benson															18										43						DNQ		41		38	237
89	Kim Crosby **(R)**	DNQ	DNQ	DNQ	39	35													28	DNQ	DNQ	39	DNQ	DNQ	DNQ	DNQ		DNQ			DNQ	DNQ					229
90	Erin Crocker																												39	35			28		40		223
91	Clay Rogers																										43								35	14	213
92	Boris Said			5																					37												207
93	Dale Quarterley																				25	42	28							DNQ							204
94	Kerry Earnhardt										5								43	DNQ					DNQ								DNQ				189
95	Kyle Krisiloff																	42								40							19				186
96	Chris Cook			26																					24												176
97	David Ragan								39									32					32				DNQ										168
98	Ron Young																						19				DNQ					36					161
99	Wade Day																29	31		DNQ																	146
100	Wally Dallenbach Jr.																								34			30									134
101	Donnie Neuenberger	38									DNQ				39				DNQ											43							129
102	Eric Jones		DNQ	29	DNQ												39																				122
103	Scott Pruett																								14												121
104	Jimmy Kitchens									QL	15																										118
105	Steve Wallace																																15				118
106	Bobby East																																17				112
107	Steadman Marlin																															19					106
108	Jimmy Morales			20																																	103
109	Hank Parker Jr.															**20**						QL											QL				103
110	Burney Lamar															DNQ															41					34	101
111	Scott Riggs				21									DNQ																							100
112	Eric Norris		41		35																																98
113	Chad Blount																22														DNQ			DNQ			97
114	Joe Ruttman										24																										91
115	Travis Kvapil																								25												88
116	Casey Mears										26																										85
117	Travis Kittleson															DNQ																	26			DNQ	85
118	David Reutimann																																			26	85
119	Ruben Garcia Novoa			27																																	82
120	Jimmy Spencer					27																	DNQ														82
121	Ron Fellows			41																					42												77
122	Kevin Conway	DNQ	DNQ									29																									76
123	Brian Sockwell						DNQ							DNQ															DNQ				30				73
124	José Luis Ramírez			31																																	70
125	Scott Gaylord			QL						31																											70
126	D. J. Hoelzle																							31													70
127	David Gilliland									43																									43		68
128	Brad Teague							DNQ								DNQ	DNQ	43			43	DNQ		DNQ			DNQ						DNQ				68
129	Randy MacDonald																					QL		32													67
130	Mike Bliss																		33																		64
131	Mara Reyes			35																																	58
132	Matt Kobyluck																								35												58
133	Chad Chaffin																																	36			55
134	Jamie Mosley																37									DNQ					DNQ						52
135	C. W. Smith	DNQ																	37																		52
136	Chris Wimmer																																	DNQ	37	DNQ	52
137	David Odell																																39				51
138	John Hayden		DNQ		DNQ	DNQ	DNQ	DNQ														38	DNQ	DNQ			DNQ										49
139	Jay Sauter							DNQ																			40										43
140	Brian Tyler																							41									DNQ				40
141	Marc Mitchell															42							41										DNQ			DNQ	37
142	Stuart Kirby						42																														37
143	Bryan Reffner																	35					43							DNQ							34
144	Rafael Martinez			43																																	34
145	Mike Harmon						43																										DNQ				34
146	Chris Horn																43			DNQ											DNQ						34
147	Justin Ashburn	DNQ						DNQ			14					DNQ																	DNQ				
148	Mark McFarland																																			20	
149	Wayne Edwards																36							DNQ													
150	Larry Hollenbeck	DNQ																																			
151	Keith Murt	DNQ																																			
152	Jeff Kendall	DNQ																																			
153	Alfredo Tame Jr.			DNQ																																	
154	Mark Montgomery			DNQ																																	
155	Todd Souza			DNQ																					DNQ												
156	Stan Silva Jr.			DNQ																					DNQ												
157	Ken Schrader				DNQ																																
158	Damon Lusk				DNQ	DNQ	DNQ										DNQ																				
159	Stan Boyd					DNQ																															
160	Blake Mallory					DNQ	DNQ																														
161	Greg Sacks										DNQ																										
162	Johnny Borneman III															DNQ	DNQ																				
163	Eddie Beahr															DNQ													DNQ								
164	Kenny Hendrick																DNQ																				
165	Chad Beahr																	DNQ																			
166	Todd Shafer																	DNQ						DNQ													
167	Jennifer Jo Cobb																					DNQ															
168	Clint Vahsholtz																					DNQ															
169	Paul Bonacorsi																								DNQ												
170	Scott Turner																								DNQ												
171	Joe Fox																								DNQ												
172	Jeff Spraker																								DNQ												
173	Jason York																												DNQ								
174	Jerick Johnson																													DNQ							
175	Travis Geisler																																DNQ				
176	Charlie Bradberry																																DNQ		DNQ		
177	John Andretti																																			DNQ	
178	Aric Almirola																																QL				
Pos	Driver	DAY	CAL	MXC	LVS	ATL	NSH	BRI	TEX	PHO	TAL	DAR	RCH	CLT	DOV	NSH	KEN	MIL	DAY	CHI	NHA	PPR	GTY	IRP	GLN	MCH	BRI	CAL	RCH	DOV	KAN	CLT	MEM	TEX	PHO	HOM	Pts

== Rookie of the Year ==
Carl Edwards won five times, nailed down four pole positions, had 21 top-ten finishes, earning him Busch Series Rookie of the Year honors while he simultaneously competed in the NEXTEL Cup Series that season. 19-year-old Reed Sorenson had two wins finished second in the running, only 158 points away from overtaking Edwards in the championship points, while for late-model racer Denny Hamlin finished fifth in points despite not winning a race. After that, the field was limited, as only Jon Wood, Brent Sherman, and Kertus Davis made full attempts at Rookie of the Year. Michel Jourdain Jr. started the year with ppc Racing, was released from the team, then came back to the organization with a different car, while Paul Wolfe, Ryan Hemphill, Boston Reid, and Blake Feese, only completed a partial season and were released from their driver development contracts. The field also featured Kim Crosby, the first woman contender for ROTY since Shawna Robinson, who only qualified for a mere handful of races with her Keith Coleman Racing team.

== See also ==
- 2005 NASCAR Nextel Cup Series
- 2005 NASCAR Craftsman Truck Series
- 2005 ARCA Re/Max Series
- 2005 NASCAR Whelen Modified Tour
- 2005 NASCAR Whelen Southern Modified Tour
