= General Tire 150 (Kentucky) =

ARCA auto race at Kentucky Speedway

ARCA Menards Series
- Venue: Kentucky Speedway
- Corporate sponsor: General Tire
- First race: 2013
- Last race: 2020
- Distance: 150 miles (240 km)
- Laps: 100
- Previous names: ZLOOP 150 (2013–2014); Crosley Brands 150 (2015–2017)
- Most wins (driver): Corey LaJoie; Brennan Poole; Ryan Reed; Austin Cindric; Austin Theriault; Ty Gibbs (1)
- Most wins (team): Randy LaJoie Racing; Venturini Motorsports; Lira Motorsports; Cunningham Motorsports; Ken Schrader Racing (1)
- Most wins (manufacturer): Ford (4)

The General Tire 150 was a 150-mile (240 km) ARCA Menards Series race held at the Kentucky Speedway.

The track hosted the series twice a year between 2000 and 2009 (except 2003), with this race being held in July as a supporting race to the NASCAR Truck Series. The other race at the track was held as a standalone race in May, except for its first year in 2000 when it was held in August.

The ARCA Series would return to the track in September 2013. After five years, it was removed from the schedule again after the 2017 season when its supporting race, the NASCAR Xfinity Series VisitMyrtleBeach.com 300 was also removed. The race was re-added in 2020 as a result of the COVID-19 schedule changes resulting in the Charlotte Motor Speedway race being cancelled.

== List of winners ==
Year	Date	Driver	Manufacturer	Race Distance		Race Time	Average Speed (mph)
Year	Date	Driver	Manufacturer	Laps	Miles (km)	Race Time	Average Speed (mph)
2000	July 2	Tim Steele	Ford	100	150 (241.402)	1:23:53	107.313
2001	July 13	Frank Kimmel	Ford	100	150 (241.402)	1:40:27	120.06
2002	July 12	Chad Blount	Dodge	100	150 (241.402)	1:39:23	121.348
2003	Not held						
2004	July 10	Ryan Hemphill	Dodge	100	150 (241.402)	0:59:57	100.584
2005	July 8	Chad Blount	Chevy	100	150 (241.402)	1:26:53	103.587
2006	July 7	Brad Coleman	Ford	110		1:41:51	97.202
2007	July 13	Michael McDowell	Dodge	100	150 (241.402)	1:30:01	99.981
2008	July 18	Scott Speed	Toyota	100	150 (241.402)	1:40:28	93.165
2009	July 18	Parker Kligerman	Dodge	100	150 (241.402)	1:23:20	108
2010 – 2012	Not held						
2013	September 21*	Corey LaJoie	Ford	100	150 (241.402)	1:12:30	124.138
2014	September 19	Brennan Poole	Toyota	100	150 (241.402)	1:15:06	119.84
2015	September 26*	Ryan Reed	Ford	100	150 (241.402)	1:26:58	103.488
2016	September 23	Austin Cindric	Ford	102	153 (246.230)	1:27:55	104.466
2017	September 22	Austin Theriault	Ford	100	150 (241.402)	1:37:14	92.561
2018 – 2019	Not held						
2020	July 11	Ty Gibbs	Toyota	100	150 (241.402)	1:25:48	104.692

- 2013 and 2015: The race was postponed a day because of rain.
- 2006 and 2016: Race extended due to green-white-checker finish.

== See also ==
- Quaker State 400 (Kentucky)
- NASCAR Xfinity Series at Kentucky Speedway
- NASCAR Camping World Truck Series at Kentucky Speedway
