= NASCAR Nationwide Series at Indianapolis Raceway Park =

NASCAR O'Reilly Auto Parts Series race

Kroger 200

NASCAR Nationwide Series
- Venue: Indianapolis Raceway Park in Clermont, Indiana
- Corporate sponsor: Kroger
- First race: 1982
- Last race: 2011
- Distance: 137.2 miles (220.801 km)
- Laps: 200

Stock car races in the NASCAR Nationwide Series were held at Indianapolis Raceway Park in Clermont, Indiana, between 1982 and 2011. The race was sponsored by Kroger during its entire existence in the second-tier series calendar, and was thus named Kroger 200.

It originally debuted as a summer night race, and was the only major NASCAR event in the state of Indiana. In previous years, USAC stock car races were held at the facility, although the two events were not associated.

In 1994, the Kroger 200 was moved to the night before the Winston Cup Series' Brickyard 400 at the nearby Indianapolis Motor Speedway. It appropriately began serving as an unofficial support race for larger Speedway's event. From 1994 to 2000, it was held on Friday night. Beginning in 2001, when the Brickyard 400 moved to Sundays, this race was held on Saturday night.

From 1995 to 2011, the race was held as a doubleheader weekend with the Truck Series AAA Insurance 200.

In 2011, the race was held for the last time in the foreseeable future. Starting in 2012 the Nationwide Series moved to the Indianapolis Motor Speedway for the Indiana 250. An ARCA race took its place.

== Race results ==
Year	Date	Driver	Team	Manufacturer	Race Distance		Race Time	Average Speed (mph)	Ref
Year	Date	Driver	Team	Manufacturer	Laps	Miles (km)	Race Time	Average Speed (mph)	Ref
1982	August 13	Morgan Shepherd	Whitaker Racing	Oldsmobile	200	137.2 (220.801)	2:02:26	67.234	
1983	August 13	Tommy Houston	Mike Day	Chevrolet	200	137.2 (220.801)	1:43:25	79.600	
1984	August 4	Morgan Shepherd	Shepherd Racing	Pontiac	200	137.2 (220.801)	1:32:56	88.579	
1985	June 22	Jimmy Hensley	Thomas Brothers Racing	Oldsmobile	200	137.2 (220.801)	1:24:56	96.923	
1986	June 21	Butch Miller	Throop Motorsports	Pontiac	200	137.2 (220.801)	1:49:08	75.431	
1987	June 6	Larry Pearson	Pearson Racing	Pontiac	200	137.2 (220.801)	1:52:09	73.402	
1988	August 6	Morgan Shepherd	Shepherd Racing	Buick	200	137.2 (220.801)	1:47:32	76.553	
1989	August 5	Michael Waltrip	Bahari Racing	Pontiac	200	137.2 (220.801)	1:37:16	84.633	
1990	August 4	Steve Grissom	Grissom Racing Enterprises	Oldsmobile	200	137.2 (220.801)	1:48:43	75.719	
1991	August 3	Bobby Labonte	Labonte Motorsports	Oldsmobile	200	137.2 (220.801)	1:48:16	76.034	
1992	August 1	Joe Nemechek	NEMCO Motorsports	Chevrolet	200	137.2 (220.801)	1:38:04	83.943	
1993	July 31	Tracy Leslie	Parker Racing	Oldsmobile	200	137.2 (220.801)	1:57:57	69.792	
1994	August 5	Mike Wallace	Owen Racing	Chevrolet	200	137.2 (220.801)	1:40:14	82.156	
1995	August 4	Jason Keller	KEL Racing	Chevrolet	200	137.2 (220.801)	1:35:21	80.335	
1996	August 2	Randy LaJoie	BACE Motorsports	Chevrolet	200	137.2 (220.801)	1:46:09	77.551	
1997	August 1	Randy LaJoie	BACE Motorsports	Chevrolet	200	137.2 (220.801)	2:18:00	59.652	
1998	July 31	Dale Earnhardt Jr.	Dale Earnhardt, Inc.	Chevrolet	200	137.2 (220.801)	1:44:23	78.883	
1999	August 6	Jason Keller	Progressive Motorsports	Chevrolet	200	137.2 (220.801)	1:52:19	73.293	
2000	August 4	Ron Hornaday Jr.	Dale Earnhardt, Inc.	Chevrolet	200	137.2 (220.801)	1:43:23	79.626	
2001	August 4	Kevin Harvick	Richard Childress Racing	Chevrolet	200	137.2 (220.801)	1:53:05	72.785	
2002	August 3	Greg Biffle	Roush Racing	Ford	200	137.2 (220.801)	1:40:39	81.788	
2003	August 2	Brian Vickers	Hendrick Motorsports	Chevrolet	200	137.2 (220.801)	1:31:25	90.049	
2004	August 7	Kyle Busch	Hendrick Motorsports	Chevrolet	200	137.2 (220.801)	1:41:19	81.25	
2005	August 6	Martin Truex Jr.	Chance 2 Motorsports	Chevrolet	204*	139.944 (225.218)	1:55:08	72.93	
2006	August 5	Kevin Harvick	Richard Childress Racing	Chevrolet	200	137.2 (220.801)	1:41:02	81.478	
2007	July 28	Jason Leffler	Braun Racing	Toyota	200	137.2 (220.801)	1:42:43	80.143	
2008	July 26	Kyle Busch	Joe Gibbs Racing	Toyota	200	137.2 (220.801)	1:42:14	80.522	
2009	July 25	Carl Edwards	Roush Fenway Racing	Ford	200	137.2 (220.801)	1:39:01	83.138	
2010	July 24	Kyle Busch	Joe Gibbs Racing	Toyota	201*	137.886 (221.906)	1:42:29	80.727	
2011	July 30	Brad Keselowski	Penske Racing	Dodge	204*	139.944 (225.218)	1:40:36	83.466	

- 2005, 2010, & 2011: Race extended due to a Green–white–checkered finish.
- 2007: First win for Toyota.
