= Brian Keselowski =

American racing driver (born 1981)

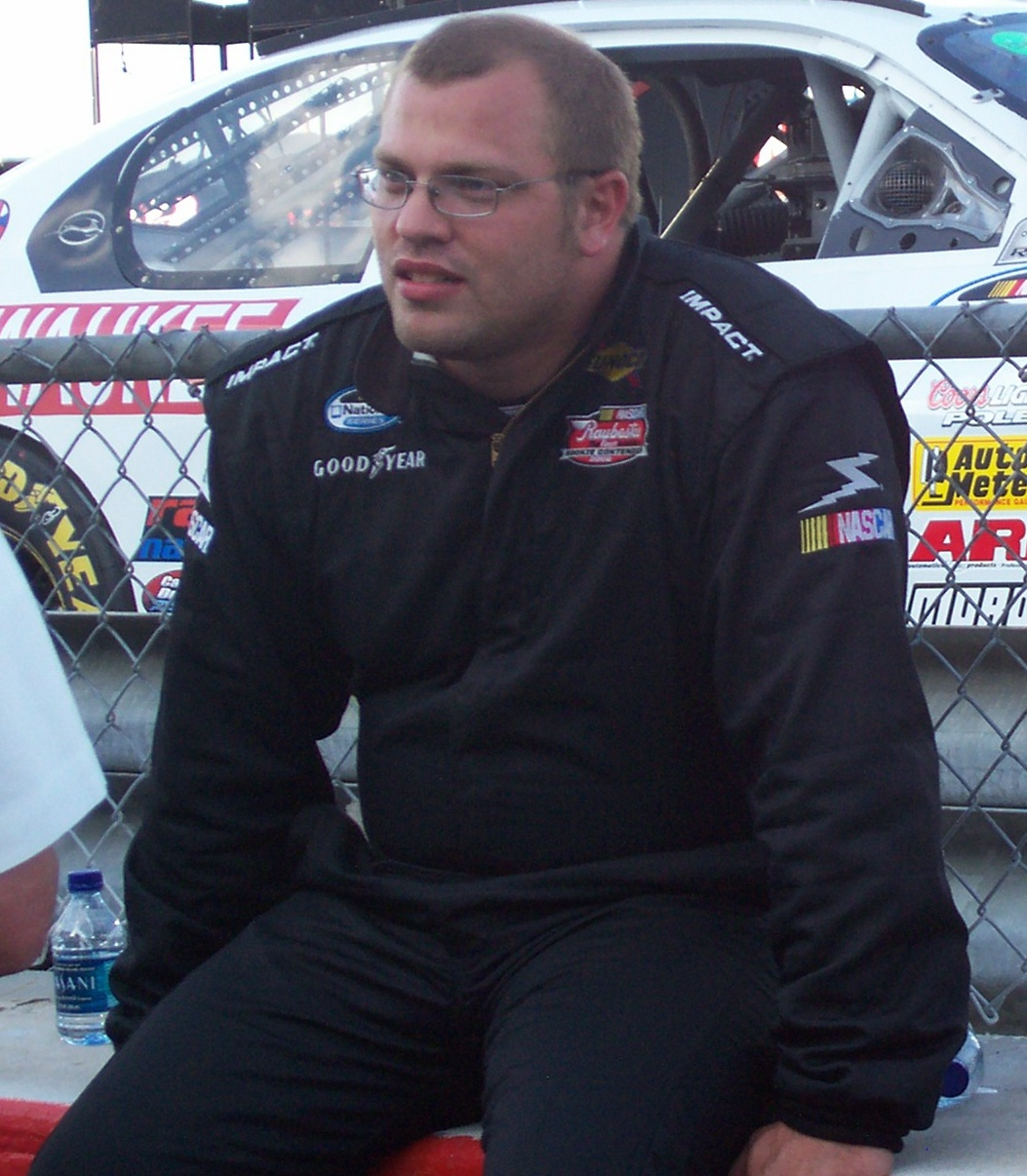
- Keselowski at the Milwaukee Mile in 2009
- Born: Brian Allen Keselowski; September 2, 1981 (age 45); Rochester Hills, Michigan, U.S.

NASCAR Cup Series career
- 3 races run over 2 years
- 2013 position: 49th
- Best finish: 49th (2013)
- First race: 2011 Daytona 500 (Daytona)
- Last race: 2013 Cheez-It 355 at The Glen (Watkins Glen)
Wins	Top tens	Poles
0	0	0

NASCAR O'Reilly Auto Parts Series career
- 63 races run over 6 years
- 2011 position: 112th
- Best finish: 31st (2010)
- First race: 2006 Arizona Travel 200 (Phoenix)
- Last race: 2011 Virginia 529 College Savings 250 (Richmond)
Wins	Top tens	Poles
0	1	0

NASCAR FedEx Freight Truck Series career
- 1 race run over 1 year
- 2015 position: 63rd
- Best finish: 63rd (2015)
- First race: 2015 Fred's 250 (Talladega)
Wins	Top tens	Poles
0	0	0
- Statistics up to date as of October 24, 2015.

Brian Allen Keselowski (born September 2, 1981) is an American former professional stock car racing driver, team owner, crew chief, and spotter. He made headlines in 2011, qualifying his family-owned K-Automotive Motorsports entry into the Daytona 500.

== Early life and family ==
Born in Rochester Hills, Michigan in 1981, Brian Keselowski is the older brother of 2012 NASCAR Sprint Cup Series champion Brad Keselowski, and the son and nephew of former drivers Bob and Ron Keselowski, respectively.

Keselowski graduated from Rochester High School in 1999, taking night classes to allow him to work as a jackman for the family racing team, K-Automotive Motorsports; he flew to the racetrack directly from his senior prom to assist in competition. He began his racing career competing in super late model events, winning rookie-of-the-year at Auto City Speedway in 2000.

== Early career ==
Keselowski made his stock car debut in the ARCA RE/MAX Series in 2004. He made six starts that season, driving the No. 29 Competition Graphics Dodge for Bob Ducharme. He had three top-tens, including a ninth-place run in his debut at Kentucky Speedway, and finished 34th in points. The next season, the team was purchased by his family, and he ran seven races including a string of five consecutive top-ten finishes. In 2006, Holloway Motorsports and Dusty's Collision became the sponsors of his car, and he won his first race at Berlin Raceway. Keselowski also made his NASCAR Busch Series (later renamed the NASCAR Nationwide Series) debut that year at Phoenix in the No. 23 Ridley Motorcycles Chevrolet for Keith Coleman Racing, starting and finishing in 43rd place. He had intended to compete at Auto Club Speedway in Fontana, California, but was not approved to run at the 2-mile (3.2 km) track; his brother Brad drove the race instead, jump-starting his career.

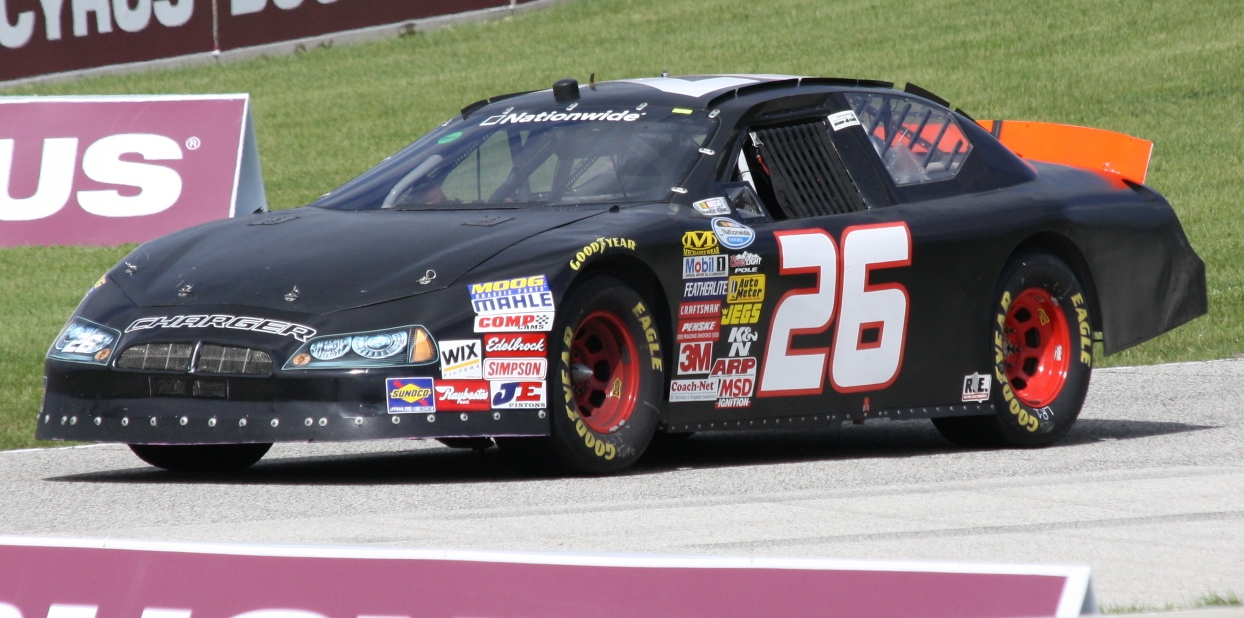
2010 Nationwide car

In 2007, Keselowski ran a career-high twelve races in the ARCA RE/MAX Series, splitting time with his family team and the No. 5 Lucas Oil Pontiac for Bobby Gerhart. He won twice and finished 22nd in points. In the Busch Series, he made four starts in the Nos. 19 and 49, including his first top ten finish at Memphis Motorsports Park. The next season, he made 11 starts, beginning in the No. 28 Jay Robinson Racing Chevy for four races before moving to his family's No. 92, co-owned with Dusty Whitney, with a best finish of 15th at ORP, four spots ahead of his brother.

For 2009, Keselowski attempted his first full-time season for Whitney and K-Automotive Motorsports, which renumbered its car with the No. 26. The primary sponsor for Keselowski's car during the 2009 CarQuest Auto Parts 300 was the Detroit Red Wings National Hockey League team; Keselowski ran eighteen races, but stepped aside for twelve of the final fifteen events to act as crew chief while other drivers competed in the car. During the 2010 season, he qualified for 26 of 35 events; he finished eleventh in the season-opening event at Daytona, but had an average finish overall for the season of 34th.

=== 2010–2012 ===
During the 2010 season, Keselowski attempted to qualify for three NASCAR Sprint Cup Series races, starting with the August race at Bristol Motor Speedway, although he failed to qualify for any of these events. In early 2011, Keselowski declared his intention to compete for the 2011 NASCAR Sprint Cup Series Rookie Of The Year title; he was the only driver to do so as of the start of Speedweeks at Daytona International Speedway, however Andy Lally stated his intention to run for the award while Speedweeks was underway. The decision to move up to the Cup Series was made on economic grounds; the costs of competing in the Nationwide Series were deemed to be comparable to a Sprint Cup effort.

In qualifying for the 2011 Daytona 500, Keselowski posted the slowest time of the 48 cars that attempted to qualify, requiring that he finish in the top two of non-qualified cars in the second Gatorade Duel to secure a position in the race. With a little help from brother Brad, Keselowski finished fifth in the second Gatorade Duel and started twelfth in the 2011 Daytona 500.

Shortly after Keselowski's surprise finish in the Duels, he received help from a number of sources, including tires from Evernham Motorsports and a Dodge R6 engine from Penske Racing. The engine Penske offered could not be fitted into the car in time. In addition, the K-Automotive Motorsports team received sponsorship from Discount Tire. Keselowski ran as high as fourth, but was involved in a wreck on lap 29, finishing 41st. Keselowski failed to qualify for the next two races.

In March 2011, Keselowski had severe abdominal pain and needed gallbladder surgery; Dennis Setzer filled in for races at Bristol, where he finished 38th, and Martinsville, where the team withdrew after a practice crash. Keselowski returned to the No. 92 team for races at Richmond and Darlington in May, but failed to qualify for either race. Following further time off for reevaluation of his underfunded race team, K-Automotive switched to Chevrolet for Michigan and received a one-race sponsorship deal with Melling Auto Parts, but failed to qualify for the race; Setzer attempted to qualify at New Hampshire and the fall Martinsville race but failed to qualify. Scott Riggs also attempted Homestead but did not qualify as well.

For 2012, the team competed in two events in the ARCA Racing Series; teaming with Sinica Motorsports to field the No. 94 for Keselowski in the ARCA event at Mobile International Speedway, and also competing at Berlin Raceway, where Keselowski posted his best finish of the season, 23rd.

=== 2013 ===
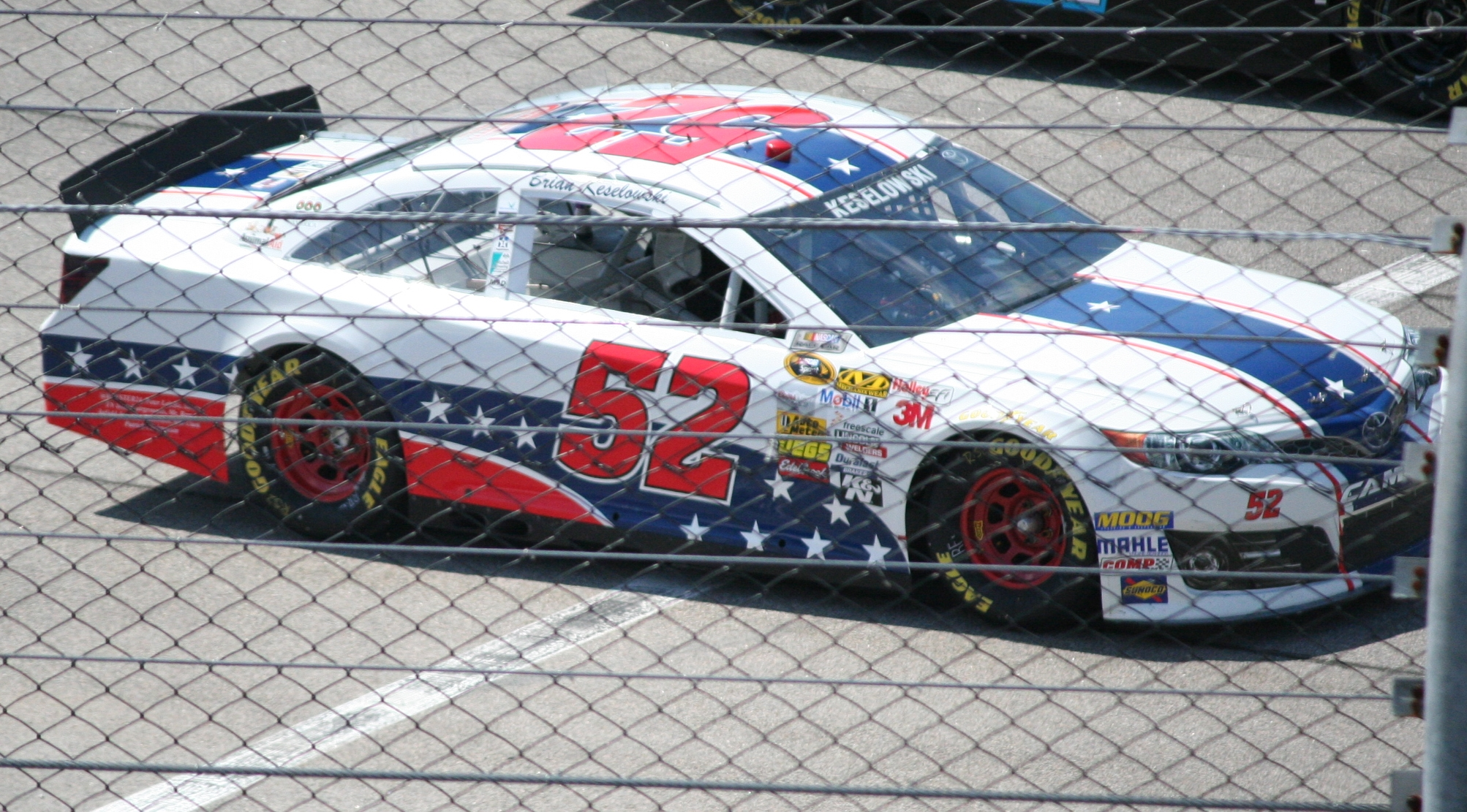
Keselowski's 2013 Cup car

In 2013, Keselowski announced his intention to compete in the Daytona 500 with Hamilton Means Racing. Keselowski did not have a great qualifying run, which made him start poorly in the Budweiser Duel. Keselowski started the Budweiser Duel 23rd, but failed to make the race, with a finish in the Duel of 21st. He returned to the Sprint Cup Series at Richmond at the end of April. He started the Sprint Showdown on May 18, qualifying 23rd and finishing nineteenth (four laps down) in a field of 23 cars. Keselowski returned to the driver's seat at Watkins Glen where he finished 39th.

=== 2014 ===
In January 2014, Keselowski announced that he would be returning to running the No. 92 for his own team, Brian Keselowski Motorsports in the 2014 season, running a Ford Fusion. Ultimately, though, the team never attempted a race.

=== 2015 ===
On October 15, 2015, Keselowski's brother Brad announced that Brian would drive the No. 29 Brad Keselowski Racing in the Camping World Truck Series at Talladega Superspeedway as a replacement driver for Austin Theriault, who had been injured earlier in the season. He ran up front for a portion of the race and led ten laps but would ultimately finish seventeenth after running out of fuel during a green-white-checkered finish.

== Crew chiefing ==
After stepping away from the drivers seat, Keselowski began to work as a crew chief, working with Stefan Parsons in the late model racing ranks in 2016 before eventually joining NASCAR Camping World Truck Series team Premium Motorsports to work on the organization's No. 49 entry. Keselowski and several other employees were dismissed from Premium when they refused to work on NY Racing Team equipment in the Premium shop in May 2018. Later that year, he joined NASCAR Xfinity Series team MBM Motorsports to become Chad Finchum's crew chief. After approximately a year with MBM, Keselowski left the team.

== Motorsports career results ==
=== NASCAR ===
(key) (Bold – Pole position awarded by qualifying time. Italics – Pole position earned by points standings or practice time. * – Most laps led.)

==== Sprint Cup Series ====
NASCAR Sprint Cup Series results
Year	Team	No.	Make	1	2	3	4	5	6	7	8	9	10	11	12	13	14	15	16	17	18	19	20	21	22	23	24	25	26	27	28	29	30	31	32	33	34	35	36	NSCC	Pts	Ref
2010	K-Automotive Motorsports	92	Dodge	DAY	CAL	LVS	ATL	BRI	MAR	PHO	TEX	TAL	RCH	DAR	DOV	CLT	POC	MCH	SON	NHA	DAY	CHI	IND	POC	GLN	MCH	BRI; DNQ	ATL	RCH; DNQ	NHA	DOV	KAN	CAL	CLT	MAR	TAL	TEX; DNQ	PHO	HOM	83rd	0	
2011	K-Automotive Motorsports	92	Dodge	DAY; 41	PHO; DNQ	LVS; DNQ	BRI	CAL	MAR	TEX	TAL	RCH; DNQ	DAR; DNQ	DOV	CLT	KAN	POC																							50th	3	
2011	K-Automotive Motorsports	92	Chevy															MCH; DNQ	SON	DAY	KEN	NHA	IND	POC	GLN	MCH	BRI	ATL	RCH	CHI	NHA	DOV	KAN	CLT	TAL	MAR	TEX	PHO	HOM	50th	3	
2013	Hamilton Means Racing	52	Toyota	DAY; DNQ	PHO	LVS	BRI	CAL	MAR	TEX	KAN																													49th	9	
2013	Brian Keselowski Motorsports	52	Toyota									RCH; 40	TAL	DAR	CLT	DOV	POC	MCH	SON	KEN	DAY	NHA	IND	POC	GLN; 39	MCH	BRI	ATL	RCH	CHI	NHA	DOV	KAN	CLT	TAL	MAR	TEX	PHO	HOM	49th	9	

===== Daytona 500 =====
Year	Team	Manufacturer	Start	Finish
2011	K-Automotive Motorsports	Dodge	12	41
2013	Hamilton Means Racing	Toyota	DNQ	

==== Nationwide Series ====
NASCAR Nationwide Series results
Year	Team	No.	Make	1	2	3	4	5	6	7	8	9	10	11	12	13	14	15	16	17	18	19	20	21	22	23	24	25	26	27	28	29	30	31	32	33	34	35	NNSC	Pts	Ref
2006	Keith Coleman Racing	23	Chevy	DAY	CAL	MXC	LVS	ATL	BRI	TEX	NSH	PHO	TAL	RCH	DAR	CLT	DOV	NSH	KEN	MLW	DAY	CHI	NHA	MAR	GTY	IRP	GLN	MCH	BRI	CAL	RCH	DOV	KAN	CLT	MEM	TEX	PHO; 43	HOM	151st	34	
2007	Whitney Motorsports	19	Dodge	DAY	CAL	MXC	LVS	ATL	BRI	NSH	TEX	PHO	TAL	RCH	DAR	CLT	DOV	NSH	KEN	MLW	NHA	DAY	CHI	GTY	IRP; 23	CGV	GLN												79th	422	
2007	Whitney Motorsports	49	Dodge																									MCH; 33	BRI	CAL	RCH	DOV	KAN	CLT	MEM; 10	TEX	PHO	HOM; 11	79th	422	
2008	Jay Robinson Racing	28	Chevy	DAY	CAL; 33	LVS; 42	ATL; 31	BRI; 31	NSH	TEX	PHO	MXC	TAL																										53rd	776	
2008	K-Automotive Motorsports	92	Dodge											RCH; 30	DAR	CLT	DOV	NSH; DNQ	KEN; 35	MLW; 27	NHA	DAY	CHI; DNQ	GTY; 40	IRP; 15	CGV	GLN	MCH; 24	BRI; DNQ	CAL	RCH	DOV	KAN; DNQ	CLT	MEM; 31	TEX	PHO	HOM	53rd	776	
2009	K-Automotive Motorsports	26	Dodge	DAY; 25	CAL; 29	LVS; 19	BRI; DNQ	TEX; DNQ		PHO; 27	TAL; 14	RCH; 21	DAR; 24	CLT; 30	DOV; 16	NSH; 30	KEN; 35	MLW; 31	NHA; 34	DAY; DNQ		GTY; 20	IRP; DNQ	IOW	GLN	MCH	BRI	CGV; 42	ATL; 33	RCH	DOV	KAN	CAL	CLT					37th	1412	
2009	K-Automotive Motorsports	96	Dodge					TEX; 38	NSH; 41												CHI; DNQ														MEM; QL^{†}	TEX	PHO	HOM; DNQ	37th	1412	
2010	K Automotive Racing	26	Dodge	DAY; 11	CAL; 34	LVS; 32	BRI; 39	NSH; 24	PHO; 20	TEX; 36	TAL; 33		DAR; 24	DOV; DNQ	CLT; DNQ	NSH; 37	KEN; DNQ	ROA; 40	NHA; 39	DAY	CHI; DNQ	GTY; 38	IRP; 34	IOW; 33	GLN; 27	MCH; 38	BRI	CGV	ATL; 31	RCH	DOV; 41	KAN; 42	CAL; 40	CLT	GTY; 41	TEX; DNQ	PHO; 34		31st	1566	
2010	K Automotive Racing	92	Dodge									RCH; 43		DOV; 42																								HOM; 34	31st	1566	
2011	Key Motorsports	47	Chevy	DAY	PHO	LVS	BRI	CAL	TEX	TAL	NSH	RCH	DAR	DOV	IOW	CLT	CHI	MCH	ROA	DAY	KEN	NHA	NSH	IRP	IOW; 42	GLN; DNQ	CGV	BRI; 42	ATL; DNQ	RCH; 43	CHI; DNQ	DOV	KAN	CLT	TEX	PHO	HOM		112th	0^{1}	
^{†} - Qualified for Michael McDowell

==== Camping World Truck Series ====
NASCAR Camping World Truck Series results
Year	Team	No.	Make	1	2	3	4	5	6	7	8	9	10	11	12	13	14	15	16	17	18	19	20	21	22	23	NCWTC	Pts	Ref
2015	Brad Keselowski Racing	29	Ford	DAY	ATL	MAR	KAN	CLT	DOV	TEX	GTW	IOW	KEN	ELD	POC	MCH	BRI	MSP	CHI	NHA	LVS	TAL; 17	MAR	TEX	PHO	HOM	63rd	28	

=== ARCA Racing Series ===
(key) (Bold – Pole position awarded by qualifying time. Italics – Pole position earned by points standings or practice time. * – Most laps led.)

ARCA Racing Series results
Year	Team	No.	Make	1	2	3	4	5	6	7	8	9	10	11	12	13	14	15	16	17	18	19	20	21	22	23	ARSC	Pts	Ref
2004	Bob Ducharme Racing	29	Dodge	DAY	NSH	SLM	KEN; 9	TOL	CLT; 38	KAN	POC	MCH	SBO	BLN	KEN; 18	GTW; 25	POC	LER	NSH; 10	ISF	TOL; 8	DSF	CHI	SLM	TAL		34th	840	
2005	K Automotive Racing	29	Ford	DAY; DNQ	NSH	SLM	KEN					MCH; 17	KAN	KEN; 7						MCH; 7	ISF				SLM; 29	TAL	34th	1250	
2005	K Automotive Racing	29	Dodge					TOL; DNQ	LAN	MIL	POC				BLN; 9	POC	GTW	LER; 7	NSH			TOL; 7	DSF	CHI			34th	1250	
2006	K Automotive Racing	29	Ford	DAY	NSH	SLM; 31	WIN	KEN			MCH; 11	KAN	KEN			GTW; 27	NSH	MCH; 4	ISF	MIL; 7	**TOL**; 5*	DSF	CHI	SLM	TAL	IOW; 10	29th	1260	
2006	K Automotive Racing	29	Dodge						TOL; 4	POC				BLN; 1	POC												29th	1260	
2007	K Automotive Racing	29	Ford	DAY; DNQ																							22nd	2020	
2007	K Automotive Racing	29	Dodge		USA; 5	NSH	SLM; 1*	KAN	WIN; 2	KEN	TOL; 6	IOW	POC	MCH; 10	BLN; 1	KEN	POC									TOL; 31	22nd	2020	
2007	Gerhart Racing	5	Chevy															NSH; 5	ISF	MIL; 22	GTW; 18	DSF	CHI; 40	**SLM**; 25*	TAL		22nd	2020	
2012	Sinica Motorsports	94	Chevy	DAY	MOB; 24	SLM	TAL	TOL	ELK	POC	MCH	WIN	NJE	IOW	CHI	IRP	POC										85th	225	
2012	Brian Keselowski Motorsports	29	Dodge															BLN; 23	ISF	MAD	SLM	DSF	KAN				85th	225	
2015	Brian Keselowski Motorsports	29	Ford	DAY	MOB	NSH	SLM	TAL	TOL	NJE	POC	MCH	CHI	WIN	IOW	IRP; 13	POC	BLN; 4	ISF	DSF	SLM; 6	KEN	KAN				40th	575	
2016	Keselowski-Gerhart Racing	5	Ford	DAY	NSH; 28	SLM; 10	TAL	TOL; 9	NJE	POC	MCH	MAD	WIN	IOW	IRP	POC	BLN	ISF	DSF	SLM	CHI	KEN	KAN				51st	460	

^{*} Season still in progress
^{1} Ineligible for series points
