= Keselowski Motorsports =

Former NASCAR team

- Owners: Bob Keselowski; Kay Keselowski; Brian Keselowski
- Base: Mooresville, North Carolina
- Series: NASCAR Sprint Cup Series
- Race drivers: 92. Brian Keselowski
- Manufacturer: Ford

Career
- Debut: 2011 Daytona 500 (Daytona)
- Latest race: 2013 Cheez-It 355 at The Glen (Watkins Glen)
- Races competed: Total: 231; Monster Energy NASCAR Cup Series: 5 Xfinity Series: 52; Camping World Truck Series: 174
- Drivers' Championships: 0
- Race victories: 10 (0 cup, 0 xfinity 10 trucks)
- Pole positions: 0

Keselowski Motorsports, formerly known as K-Automotive Racing and Brian Keselowski Motorsports, was a stock car racing team in the NASCAR Sprint Cup Series. K-Automotive previously raced in ARCA and the Nationwide Series. K-Automotive is owned and operated by Bob, Brian and Kay Keselowski. Brian Keselowski Motorsports is owned and operated by Brian Keselowski.

The team began racing in ARCA and USAC Series in the 1969 with Ron driving and Bob serving as the team's crew chief.

== Winston Cup Series ==
K Automotive made its debut in the NASCAR Grand National Series in 1969, the team being owned by John Keselowski. Fielding the number 62 Kaye Engineering Dodge, Homer Newland finished 36th in the team's debut at Michigan International Speedway. Newland also ran K Automotive's car at the inaugural event at Alabama International Motor Speedway, starting eighth, but dropping to twenty-seventh due to an engine failure.

In 1970, Ron began running most of the races for the team. He ran seventeen races, finishing eighth at the West Virginia 300, and finished 39th in the final points standings. They also fielded a car for Dave Marcis at the Southern 500, finishing 29th. In 1971, K fielded entries for a variety of drivers, including Ron, Dick Polling, and Bill Shirley. After taking the following year off, K returned in 1973, fielding a car for Ron in two races. He finished fifth at Michigan International Speedway. They made one start in 1974 with Bob Whitlow before making their final Cup start at the 1975 Daytona 500 when Jim Vandiver finished 35th after a wreck.

== Local racing and ARCA Racing Series ==
In 1975, Bob and Ron switched roles, with Bob becoming the team's driver and Ron the crew chief. Bob made his late model debut at Toledo Speedway and moved to full-time USAC racing in 1976, running 1974 Dodge Challengers and Aspens, garnering a best finish of seventh in competition. In 1978, he also ran some NASCAR Late Model Sportsman races in addition to the USAC series. He continued to run USAC and the NASCAR Grand American Series over the next several years, and won the 1983 track championship at Toledo.

In 1986, Bob Keselowski began running the ARCA series in the number 29 Chevrolet, making seven starts and getting two second-place finishes before winning his first race at Berlin Raceway. He continued to win many races and awards through the next several years, and was the 1989 ARCA Supercar champion. That same year, Chrysler re-entered auto racing, starting with the ARCA series. K was selected as one of the teams, and Mopar Performance sponsored Keselowski's number 29 Chrysler LeBaron throughout the 1990 season. Together, they won the season-opener at Daytona and finished 3rd in points. Keselowski would continue to compete in the ARCA series until the end of the 1994 season.

Ten years later, the Keselowskis returned to the series to field the number 29 Competition Graphics Dodge under a partnership with Bob Ducharme. Brian Keselowski drove seven races and had a top-ten in his debut at Kentucky Speedway along with two other top-tens. Despite failing to qualify twice in 2005, he had a string of five consecutive top-ten finishes out of seven starts. In 2006, he won his first career race at Berlin with Holloway Motorsports sponsoring and finished 29th in points. He followed that up with additional wins in the 29 in 2007. That year Mike Ciochetti drove at Talladega but wrecked and finished 39th. In addition, they expanded to a second car, the number 00 Orchard Chrysler Dodge Jeep Dodge owned by Brad Keselowski with Robb Brent. Brent ran two seasons in limited schedules and had five top-tens in sixteen starts.

In 2009, K returned to ARCA with the number 29 Chevrolet and hired Mikey Kile and Chad Finley to drive on a part-time basis. Kile had four top-ten finishes in the Greased Lightning Cleaning Products Chevy, and Finley had three in the Auto Value Chevy. Jesse Smith drove the season opener at Daytona in 2010.

== Craftsman Truck Series ==
=== Truck No. 29 history ===
K returned to NASCAR in 1995 with the formation of the SuperTruck Series by Craftsman. Bob began driving the team's number 29 Winnebago Industries Dodge Ram, starting sixteen races and finishing in the top-ten four times, earning him a fourteenth-place points finish. He dropped to sixteenth in the standings the next year when he posted just one top-ten. In 1997, he finished a career-best fourteenth in the standings and won his only truck race at Richmond International Raceway in the Mopar Dodge. During the 1998 season, Keselowski was injured and was replaced by Dennis Setzer. Over a span of five races, Setzer had two eighth-place finishes. Keselowski returned and finished tenth at Heartland Park Topeka before handing the driving chores back to Setzer for the rest of the season. Setzer then won his first career race at Mesa Marin Raceway. In 1999, K created a second truck, the number 1, for Setzer to drive while Keselowski drove the number 29 part-time, doing research and development for Dodge. Keselowski ran five races and had a top-ten finish at Texas Motor Speedway before he retired. Setzer won three times and lost the championship by 108 points.

In 2000, Setzer won one race at Nazareth Speedway and fell to seventh in the standings. Terry Cook drove the number 29 in a one-race deal at the season finale at California Speedway and finished seventh. When Setzer left, the team switched to the number 29 and Ford. Cook joined the team full-time with sponsorship from Power Stroke Diesel. In his first year with the team, Cook won the pole at Nazareth and finished tenth in the standings. In 2002, he won four races and two poles but dropped to ninth in the final points. After he did not win again in 2003, he and PSD left the team.

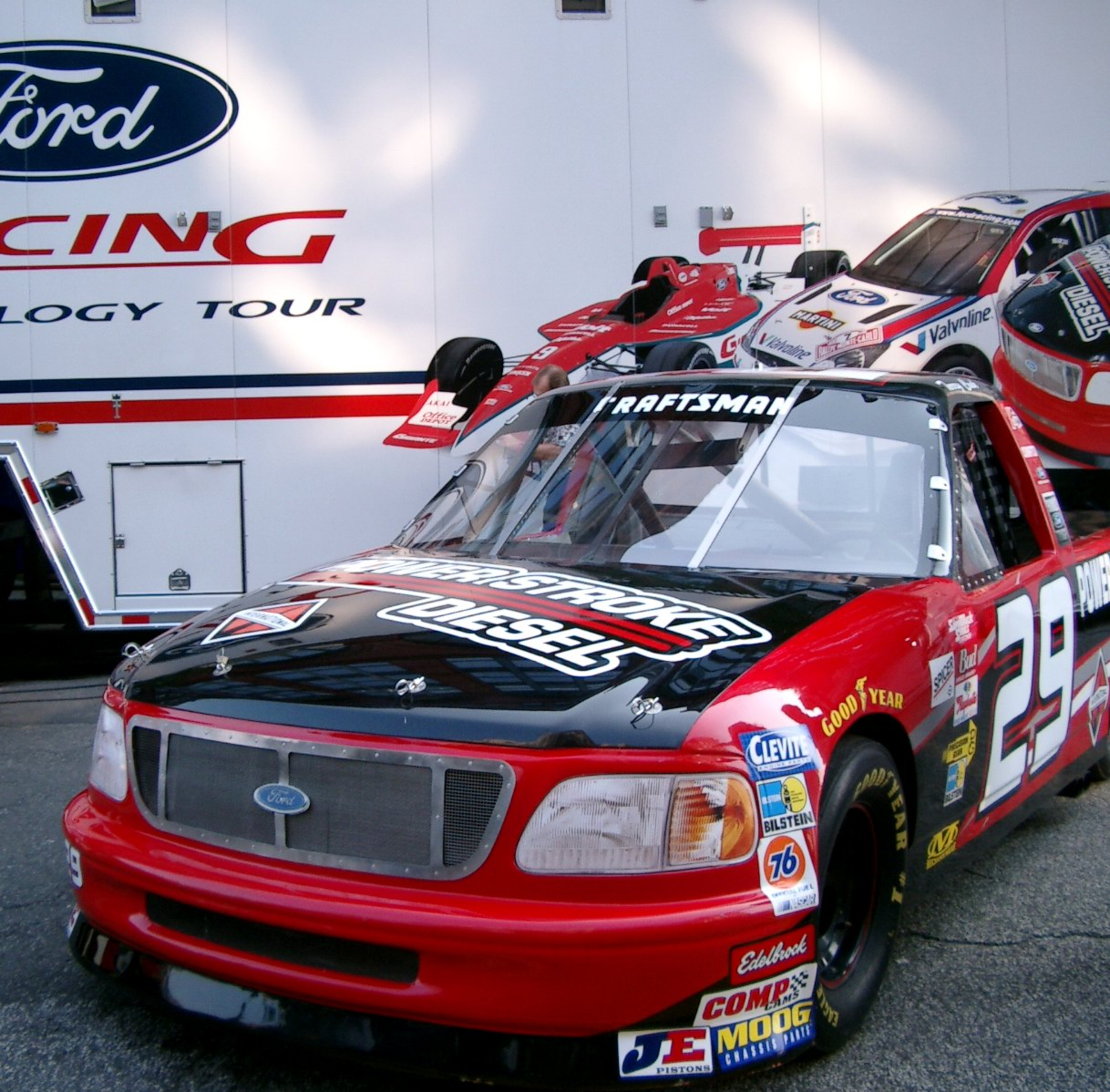
The number 29 truck in 2003.

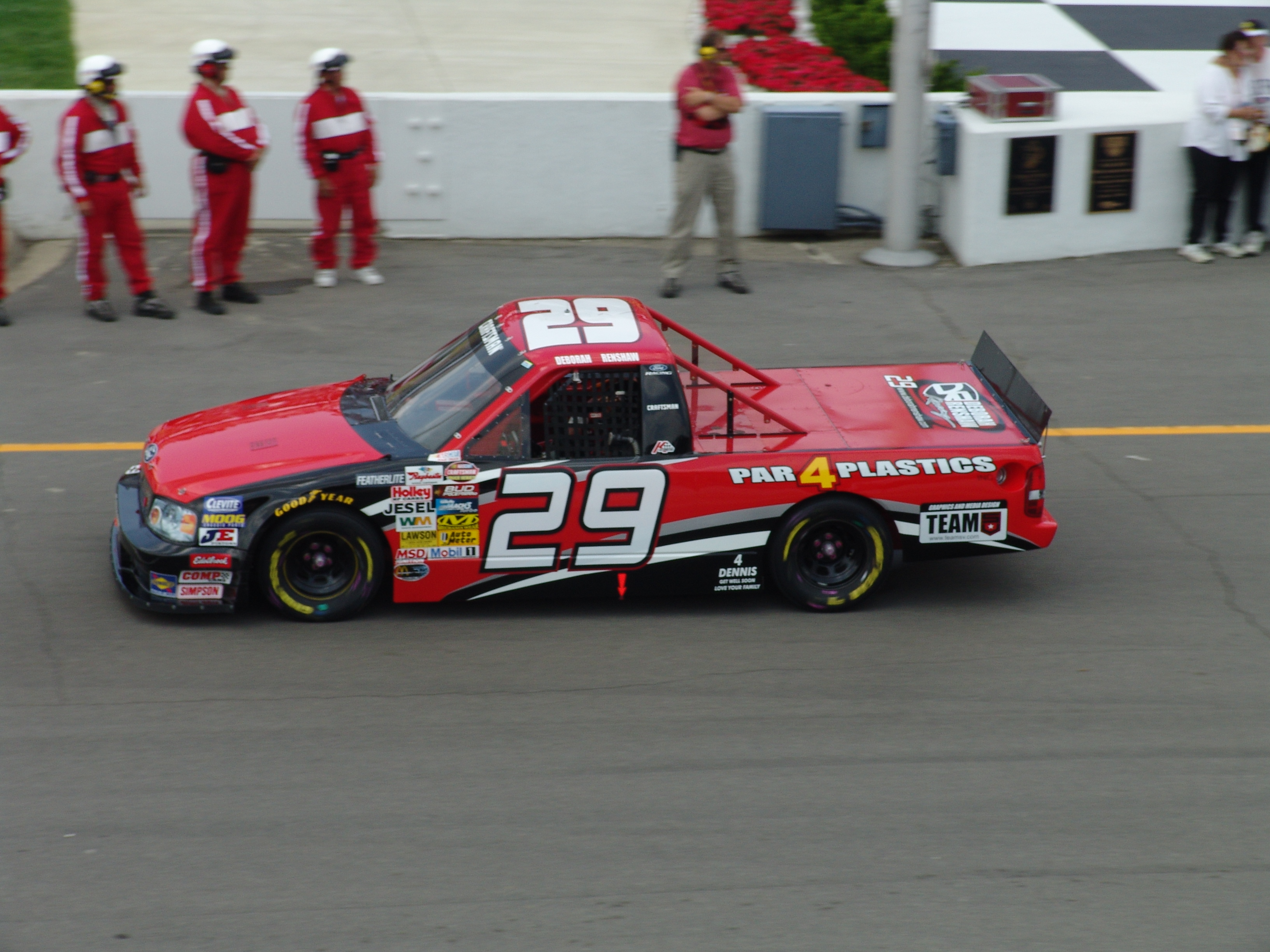
The number 29 truck in 2004 @ Michigan International Speedway.

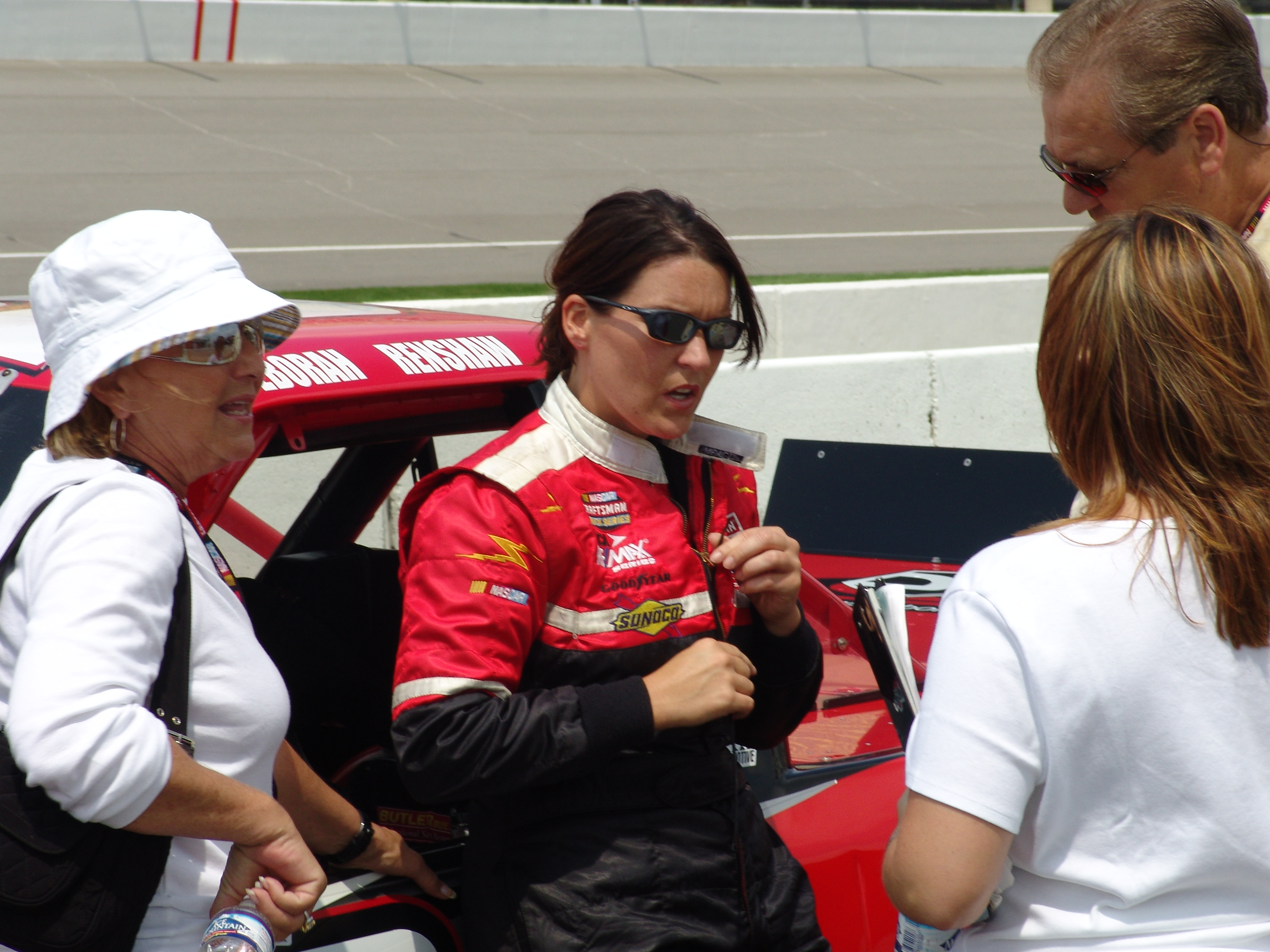
Deborah Renshaw, driver of the number 29 truck in 2004 @ Michigan International Speedway.

The team began 2004 with Frank Kimmel driving. He finished eighth at Daytona before Brad Keselowski began driving. He made eight races, his best finish sixteenth at Mansfield before Deborah Renshaw finished out the season. Her best finish came at Martinsville Speedway, where she finished fifteenth. Brad became the team's full-time driver in 2005 with SUBcrews.com/Samson Stone as primary sponsors. He had a seventh-place finish at Daytona and finished 21st in points. Due to a lack of sponsorship, the team only ran the first two races of the season before suspending operations. While they did not attempt a race for the rest of the year, they loaned their owner's points to Morgan-Dollar Motorsports and partnered with MB Motorsports to run the O'Reilly Auto Parts 200 that season with Brad driving. He finished 34th after an engine failure.

== Nationwide Series ==
=== Car No. 26 history ===
Beginning in the 2007 season, the team partnered with Holloway Motorsports to field entries in the Nationwide Series. They ran one race as the number 19 and then as the number 49 for three more races with Brian Keselowski driving, with a top-ten finish at Memphis Motorsports Park. After he drove briefly for Jay Robinson Racing, Keselowski moved to the team's number 92 Dodge to drive on a part-time schedule.

In 2009, the team changed numbers from number 92 to number 26 for their main car, and began to run full-time with limited sponsorship from Fischer Honda and Dusty's Collisions. Brian drove most of the races early on in the year with not a lot of luck with his best finish being 14th at Talladega. Later in the year Michael McDowell took over the ride. He drove to an 8th-place finish in Iowa as well as a 10th at Bristol. After one off starts with Danny O'Quinn and Dennis Setzer, Kevin Conway leased the team's owner points for the rest of the year and ran the ExtenZe car with a best finish of 20th.

In 2010 Brian ran most of the season, running full races until the team fell outside the top 30 in owner points, where the team start-n-parked

K-Automotive partnered with Team Penske, to have Parker Kligerman & Sam Hornish Jr run races in the 26. Kligerman would run 3 of the Races with the new Nationwide Series COT car, along with Montreal.

Kligerman finished 13th in the July Daytona race, 8th at Montreal, 15th in the fall Richmond Race & 43rd in the fall Charlotte race due to Kligerman crashing on lap 4.

Sam Hornish Jr drove the 26 car at the season finale at Homestead-Miami, finishing 26th.

==== Car No. 26 results ====
Year	Driver	No.	Make	1	2	3	4	5	6	7	8	9	10	11	12	13	14	15	16	17	18	19	20	21	22	23	24	25	26	27	28	29	30	31	32	33	34	35	Owners	Pts
2007	Brian Keselowski	19	Dodge	DAY	CAL	MXC	LVS	ATL	BRI	NSH	TEX	PHO	TAL	RCH	DAR	CLT	DOV	NSH	KEN	MLW	NHA	DAY	CHI	GTY	IRP; 23	CGV	GLN												56th	422
2007	Brian Keselowski	49	Dodge																									MCH; 33	BRI	CAL	RCH	DOV	KAN	CLT	MEM; 10	TEX	PHO	HOM; 11	56th	422
2009	Brian Keselowski	26	Dodge	DAY; 25	CAL; 29	LVS; 19	BRI; DNQ	TEX; DNQ		PHO; 27	TAL; 14	RCH; 21	DAR; 24	CLT; 30	DOV; 16	NSH; 30	KEN; 35	MLW; 31	NHA; 34	DAY; DNQ		GTY; 20	IRP; DNQ					CGV; 42	ATL; 33										28th	2861
2009	Dennis Setzer	26	Dodge						NSH; 20												CHI; 30																		28th	2861
2009	Michael McDowell	26	Dodge																					IOW; 8	GLN; 27	MCH; 17	BRI; 10			RCH; 19			CAL; 38	CLT	MEM	TEX	PHO	HOM	28th	2861
2009	Danny O'Quinn Jr.	26	Dodge																												DOV; 34	KAN							28th	2861
2010	Brian Keselowski	26	Dodge	DAY; 11	CAL; 34	LVS; 32	BRI; 39	NSH; 24	PHO; 20	TEX; 36	TAL; 33		DAR; 24	DOV; DNQ	CLT	NSH; 37	KEN; DNQ	ROA; 40	NHA; 39	DAY	CHI; DNQ	GTY; 38	IRP; 34	IOW; 33	GLN; 27	MCH; 38			ATL; 31	RCH	DOV; 41	KAN; 42	CAL; 40	CLT	GTY; 41	TEX; DNQ	PHO; 34	HOM	35th	2182
2010	Johnny Chapman	26	Dodge									RCH; 33																											35th	2182
2010	Dennis Setzer	26	Dodge																								BRI; 42	CGV											35th	2182

=== Car No. 92 history ===
The 92 car debuted in 2009 at Michigan with Willie Allen driving. He and Setzer made a total of seven starts in the car that season, but neither finished a race. Johnny Chapman began the 2010 season as driver, but after only qualifying for one race, he was replaced by Setzer, with Brian and Andy Ponstein occasionally filling. The number 92 is a start and park entry to help fund the number 26. However, the 92 ran Talladega in 2010 in its entire 312 miles (plus 7.98 miles more due to a green–white–checkered finish), and finished 17th, after getting in the catch-fence on the last lap and catching fire.

Brian Keselowski drove the 92 in the 2010 Nationwide Series Finale at Homestead-Miami due to Sam Hornish Jr driving the 26. Brian attempted to run the entire race, where he le 4 laps during green flag pit stops, however he blew a tire and hit wall, finishing with a 34th place finish.

==== Car No. 92 results ====
Year	Driver	No.	Make	1	2	3	4	5	6	7	8	9	10	11	12	13	14	15	16	17	18	19	20	21	22	23	24	25	26	27	28	29	30	31	32	33	34	35	Owners	Pts
2008	Brian Keselowski	92	Dodge	DAY	CAL	LVS	ATL	BRI	NSH	TEX	PHO	MXC	TAL	RCH; 30	DAR	CLT	DOV	NSH; DNQ	KEN; 35	MLW; 27	NHA	DAY	CHI; DNQ	GTY; 40	IRP; 15	CGV	GLN	MCH; 24	BRI; DNQ	CAL	RCH	DOV	KAN; DNQ	CLT	MEM; 31	TEX	PHO	HOM	49th	629
2009	Willie Allen	92	Dodge	DAY	CAL	LVS	BRI	TEX	NSH	PHO	TAL	RCH	DAR	CLT	DOV	NSH	KEN	MLW	NHA	DAY	CHI	GTY	IRP	IOW	GLN	MCH; 42	BRI	CGV	ATL	RCH		KAN; DNQ			MEM; 43				56th	293
2009	Dennis Setzer	92	Dodge																												DOV; 38		CAL; Wth	CLT; 42		TEX; 42	PHO; 42	HOM; 41	56th	293
2010	Johnny Chapman	92	Dodge	DAY; DNQ	CAL; DNQ	LVS; DNQ	BRI; 43																																41st	1111
2010	Dennis Setzer	92	Dodge					NSH; DNQ	PHO; 43	TEX; 43	TAL; 17		DAR; 43	DOV; QL^{‡}	CLT; 39	NSH; 43	KEN; 43		NHA; 43	DAY	CHI; 43	GTY; 42	IRP; 43	IOW; 42				CGV; Wth	ATL; 41	RCH	DOV; 42		CAL; 42	CLT		TEX; 43	PHO; 42		41st	1111
2010	Brian Keselowski	92	Dodge									RCH; 43		DOV; 42																								HOM; 34	41st	1111
2010	Andy Ponstein	92	Dodge															ROA; 42														KAN; DNQ			GTY; 38				41st	1111
2010	Dan Brode	92	Dodge																						GLN; 41	MCH	BRI												41st	1111

=== Car No. 96 history ===
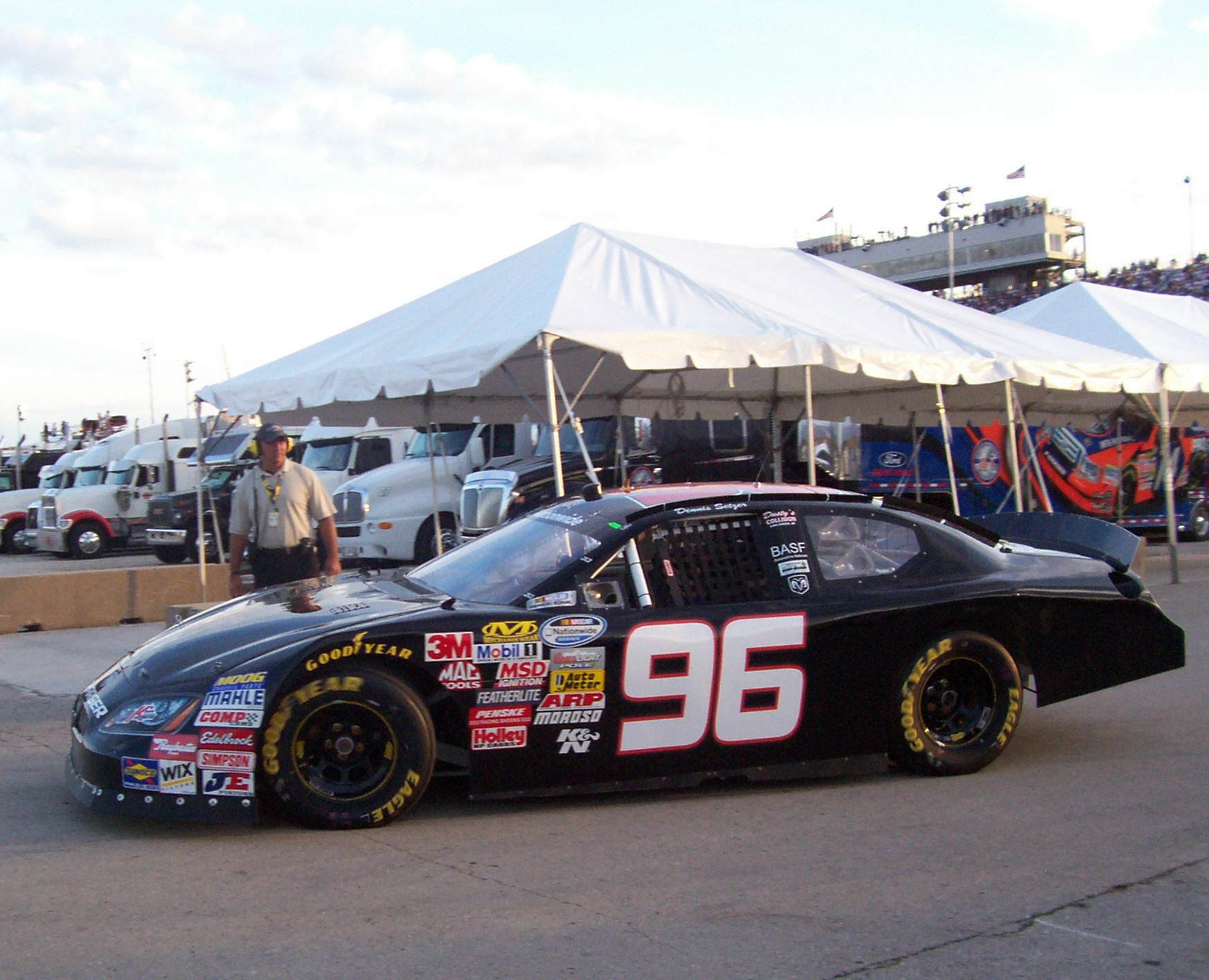
The number 96 car at The Milwaukee Mile in 2009 driven by Dennis Setzer

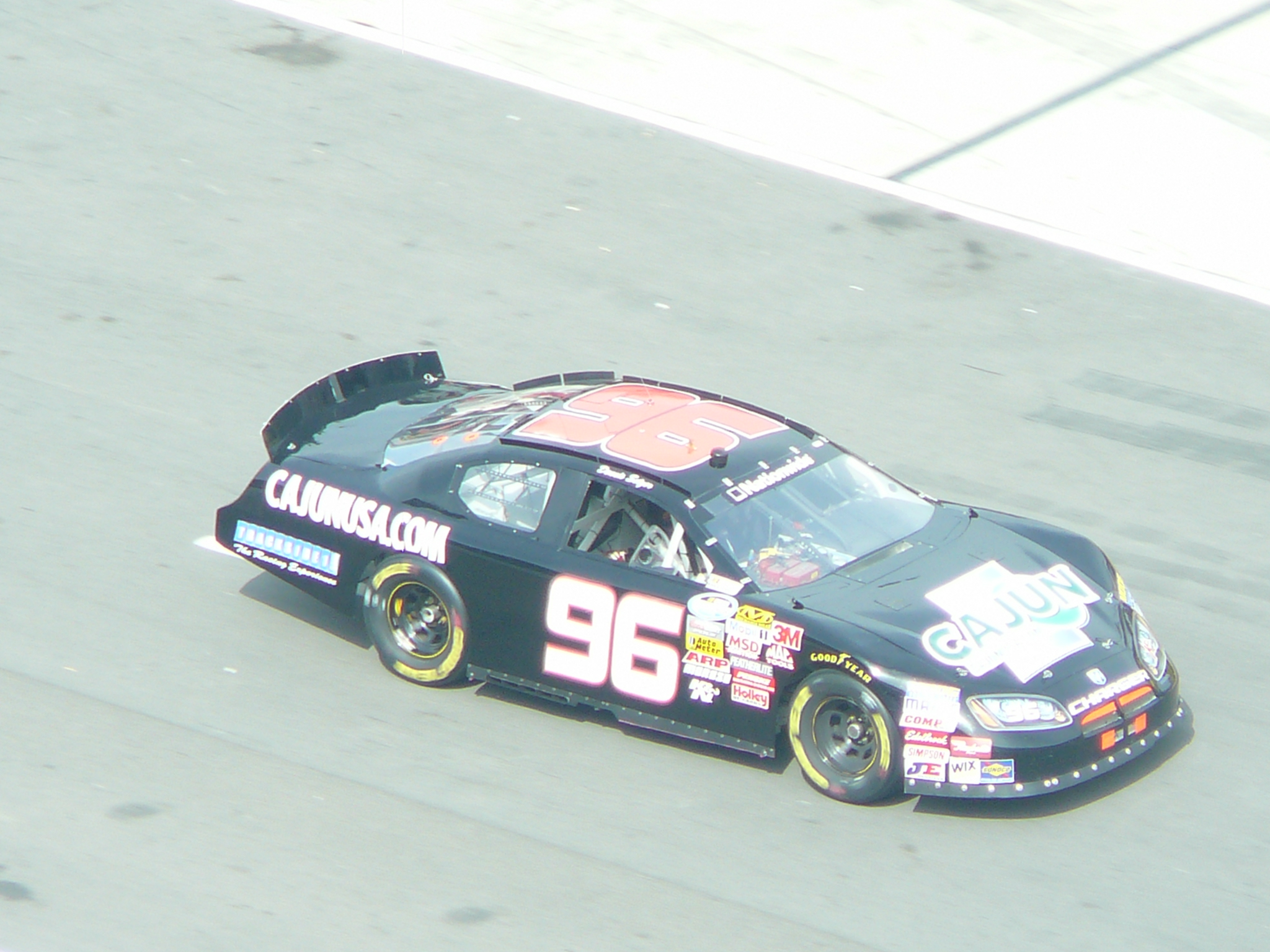
The number 96 car at Bristol Motor Speedway in 2009

The 96 car also debuted in the 2009 season, but in the second race of the season. Setzer drove for the first three starts, followed by Brian Keselowski and Willie Allen. Eventually Michael McDowell would become the driver of the car with AT&T and The Real Yellow Pages sponsoring, getting an eleventh-place finish at Montreal. Setzer was expected to drive the car for most of 2010, where he qualified for four of the first five races. However after Johnny Chapman failed to qualify in 4 of the first 5 races in the 92 car, Setzer was moved to the 92. The 96 returned for Darlington where Chapman failed to qualify. Dennis Setzer returned to 96 in Homestead.

==== Car No. 96 results ====
Year	Driver	No.	Make	1	2	3	4	5	6	7	8	9	10	11	12	13	14	15	16	17	18	19	20	21	22	23	24	25	26	27	28	29	30	31	32	33	34	35	Owners	Pts
2009	Dennis Setzer	96	Dodge	DAY	CAL; 42	LVS; 43	BRI; 38	TEX; QL^{†}		PHO; DNQ	TAL	RCH	DAR; DNQ	CLT; 38	DOV; 42			MLW; 41					IRP; DNQ			MCH; 42	BRI; DNQ			RCH; 34			CAL; 36						42nd	1455
2009	Brian Keselowski	96	Dodge					TEX; 38	NSH; 41												CHI; DNQ														MEM; QL^{‡}			HOM; DNQ	42nd	1455
2009	Willie Allen	96	Dodge													NSH; 36			NHA; 42	DAY		GTY; 41																	42nd	1455
2009	Blake Bjorklund	96	Dodge														KEN; DNQ																						42nd	1455
2009	Andy Ponstein	96	Dodge																					IOW; DNQ	GLN														42nd	1455
2009	Michael McDowell	96	Dodge																									CGV; 11	ATL; 35		DOV; 29	KAN; DNQ		CLT; 23	MEM; 21	TEX; 29	PHO; 25		42nd	1455
2010	Dennis Setzer	96	Dodge	DAY; Wth	CAL; 42	LVS; 43	BRI; DNQ	NSH; Wth	PHO	TEX																												HOM; 42	67th	130
2010	Johnny Chapman	96	Dodge								TAL; Wth	RCH; Wth	DAR; DNQ	DOV; Wth	CLT	NSH	KEN	ROA	NHA	DAY	CHI	GTY	IRP	IOW	GLN	MCH	BRI												67th	130
2010	Brian Keselowski	96	Dodge																									CGV; Wth	ATL	RCH; Wth	DOV	KAN	CAL	CLT	GTY	TEX	PHO		67th	130

== Sprint Cup Series ==
=== Car No. 92 history ===
K-Automotive motorsports returned to the Cup Series in 2010 with the number 92 Dodge. The team attempted the Daytona 500 with Mike Wallace and four races with Brian Keselowski, but the team did not qualify for any of the events. The team also raced in the Sprint Showdown at Charlotte Motor Speedway with Robert Richardson Jr. driving and sponsorship provided by The Grill Topper.

In 2011, K-Automotive shut down their Nationwide team and moved up to Cup full-time. Keselowski qualified for the Daytona 500 after he raced his way from the slowest of the 48 cars who attempted the race to finishing fifth in his qualifying race, giving him the 12th starting position for the 500. Offers also started pouring in from Ray Evernham, Roger Penske, and Golden Corral. Discount Tire later sponsored the number 92. The team finished 41st after a crash and did not qualify for the next two races. In March, Keselowski had his gall bladder removed, so Dennis Setzer took over the car for Keselowski in Bristol and qualified for Bristol and finished 38th after engine trouble. The team then entered with Setzer in Martinsville, but was forced to withdraw after a crash in practice when the cars brakes failed and they did not have a backup car. K-Automotive then scaled down to a partial schedule because they only had one car. They announced a switch to Chevrolet prior to the Michigan race in June and attempted the race with sponsorship from Melling but failed to make the race. Dennis Setzer attempted New Hampshire and the fall Martinsville race but did not qualify. Scott Riggs attempted Homestead but did not qualify that as well.

In 2013, Keselowski changed the number to 52, as he was using owners points from Hamilton Means Racing to run a limited schedule. Keselowski attempted the 2013 Daytona 500, but failed to make the race. He ran Richmond and finished 40th. Later in the season, 71-year-old Morgan Shepherd ran at Loudon, at the time the oldest driver to start a race. Keselowski would return to the car at Watkins Glen, finishing 39th after starting 43rd.

At Sonoma, BKM lent their owner points to Go Green Racing, who fielded rookie Paulie Harraka. This entry was unrelated to BKM's entries.

In 2014, Keselowski changed the number back to 92 and the team switched to Ford, purchasing a car from Germain Racing, who had switched to Chevy. However, the team never entered a race due to lack of sponsorship.

==== Car No. 92 results ====
NASCAR Sprint Cup Series results
Year	Driver	No.	Make	1	2	3	4	5	6	7	8	9	10	11	12	13	14	15	16	17	18	19	20	21	22	23	24	25	26	27	28	29	30	31	32	33	34	35	36	Owners	Pts
2010	Mike Wallace	92	Dodge	DAY; DNQ	CAL	LVS	ATL	BRI	MAR	PHO	TEX	TAL	RCH	DAR	DOV	CLT	POC	MCH	SON	NHA	DAY	CHI	IND	POC	GLN	MCH														54th	61
2010	Brian Keselowski	92	Dodge																								BRI; DNQ	ATL	RCH; DNQ	NHA	DOV	KAN	CAL	CLT; Wth	MAR	TAL	TEX; DNQ	PHO	HOM	54th	61
2011	Brian Keselowski	92	Dodge	DAY; 41	PHO; DNQ	LVS; DNQ				TEX; Wth	TAL	RCH; DNQ	DAR; DNQ	DOV	CLT	KAN	POC																							54th	9
2011	Brian Keselowski	92	Chevy															MCH; DNQ	SON	DAY	KEN																			54th	9
2011	Dennis Setzer	92	Dodge				BRI; 38	CAL	MAR; Wth																															54th	9
2011	Dennis Setzer	92	Chevy																			NHA; DNQ	IND	POC	GLN	MCH	BRI	ATL	RCH	CHI	NHA	DOV	KAN	CLT	TAL	MAR; DNQ	TEX	PHO		54th	9
2011	Scott Riggs	92	Chevy																																				HOM; DNQ	54th	9
2013	Brian Keselowski	52	Toyota	DAY; DNQ	PHO	LVS	BRI	CAL	MAR	TEX	KAN	RCH; 40	TAL	DAR; Wth	CLT	DOV	POC	MCH	SON	KEN	DAY			POC; Wth	GLN; 39	MCH	BRI	ATL	RCH	CHI	NHA	DOV	KAN	CLT	TAL	MAR	TEX	PHO	HOM	46th	17
2013	Morgan Shepherd	52	Toyota																			NHA; 41	IND																	46th	17

== See also ==
- Brad Keselowski Racing
