= 2011 Subway Fresh Fit 500 =

Race details
- Race 2 of 36 in the 2011 NASCAR Sprint Cup Series
- 2011 Subway Fresh Fit 500 program cover, featuring Carl Edwards, who was sponsored by Subway
- Date: February 27, 2011
- Location: Phoenix International Raceway in Avondale, Arizona, US
- Course: Permanent racing facility
- Course length: 1 miles (1.6 km)
- Distance: 312 laps, 312 mi (502.115 km)
- Weather: Showers with a high around 50; wind out of the WSW at 13 mph.
- Average speed: 102.961 miles per hour (165.700 km/h)

Pole position
Driver	Carl Edwards	Roush Fenway Racing
- Time: 26.224

Most laps led
Driver	Jeff Gordon	Hendrick Motorsports
- Laps: 138

Winner
No. 24	Jeff Gordon	Hendrick Motorsports

Television in the United States
- Network: Fox
- Announcers: Mike Joy, Darrell Waltrip and Larry McReynolds

The 2011 Subway Fresh Fit 500 was a NASCAR Sprint Cup Series stock car race held on February 27, 2011, at Phoenix International Raceway in Avondale, Arizona, United States. Contested over 312 laps, it was the second race of the 2011 season and was won by Jeff Gordon for Hendrick Motorsports. Kyle Busch of Joe Gibbs Racing finished in second, while Gordon's teammate, Jimmie Johnson, finished third.

Carl Edwards led the first lap from pole position ahead of Kurt Busch who started second on the grid. The race was caution free until lap 29 (debris), and then 48 laps later a multiple crash occurred involving 13 drivers. Later there were several lead changes, and another four cautions. With nine laps remaining, Gordon took the lead from Kyle Busch to win his first race of the season, his first in more than 60 races.

There were eight cautions and 29 lead changes among 12 different drivers during the race. Gordon's win moved him to sixth position in the drivers' championship, 15 points behind leader Kyle Busch and one ahead of Bobby Labonte in seventh. In the Manufacturers' Championship, Toyota, Ford and Chevrolet had 12 points, four ahead of Dodge. A total of 75,000 people attended the race, and 10.36 million watched it on television.

== Report ==
=== Background ===
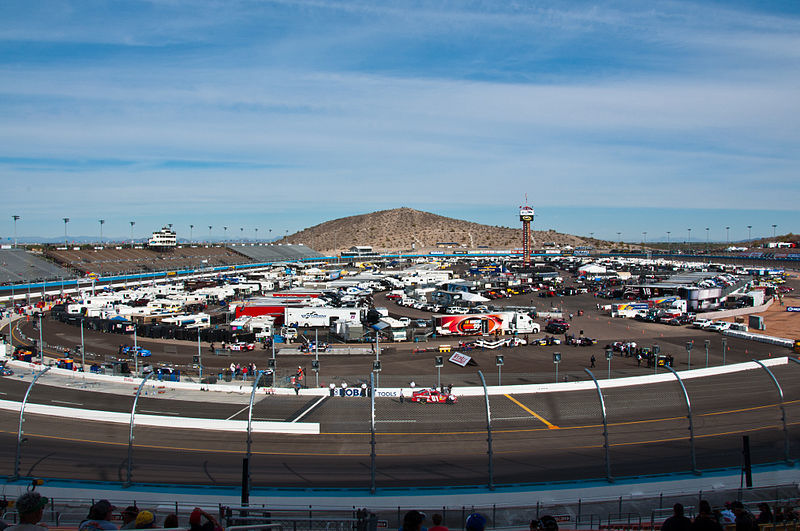
Phoenix International Raceway, the race track where the race was held

The layout of Phoenix International Raceway, the venue where the race was held

Phoenix International Raceway is one of five short tracks to hold NASCAR races; the others are Richmond International Raceway, Dover International Speedway, Bristol Motor Speedway, and Martinsville Speedway. The standard track at Phoenix International Raceway is a four-turn short track oval that is 1 mile (1.6 km) long. The track's turns were banked from 9 to 11 degrees, while the front stretch, the location of the finish line, was banked at 3 degrees. The back stretch had a 9 degree banking. The racetrack has seats for 76,800 spectators.

Before the race, Carl Edwards was leading the Drivers' Championship with 42 points, and David Gilliland stood in second with 41 points. Bobby Labonte followed in third also with 41 points, one ahead of Kurt Busch and two ahead of Juan Pablo Montoya in fourth and fifth. In the Manufacturers' Championship, Ford was leading with nine points, three points ahead of their rival Toyota. Dodge, with 4 points, was one point ahead of Chevrolet in the battle for third. Ryan Newman was the race's defending winner.

=== Practice and qualifying ===
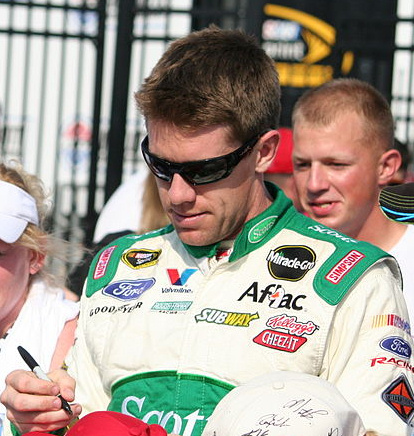
Carl Edwards won the pole position, after having the fastest time at 26.224 seconds.

Two practice sessions were held before the race on Friday. The first session lasted 80 minutes long, while the second was 85 minutes long. Kurt Busch was quickest with a time of 26.366 seconds in the first session, more than five-tenths of a second faster than Jeff Burton. Denny Hamlin was just off Burton's pace, followed by Kevin Harvick, Kyle Busch, and Brad Keselowski. Kasey Kahne was seventh, still within a second of Kurt Busch's time. Also in the session, Trevor Bayne collided into the wall, so the team had to go to their back-up car. In the second practice session, Kyle Busch was fastest with a time of 26.454 seconds, only one-hundredth of a second quicker than second-placed David Ragan. Edwards took third place, ahead of Jamie McMurray, Greg Biffle and Martin. Newman only managed seventh place.

Forty-four cars were entered for qualifying, but only forty-three raced because of NASCAR's qualifying procedure. Edwards clinched his eighth pole position during his career, with a time of 26.224 seconds, which was a new track record. He was joined on the front row of the grid by Kurt Busch. Kahne qualified third, Kyle Busch took fourth, and Smith started fifth. Joey Logano, Martin Truex Jr., McMurray, Keselowski, and Biffle rounded out the first ten positions. The driver who failed to qualify for the race was Brian Keselowski, who had a time of 27.431 seconds.

=== Race ===
The race, the second in the season, began at 3:00 p.m. EST and was televised live in the United States on Fox. The conditions on the grid were dry before the race with the air temperature at 54 °F (12 °C). Phoenix International Raceway Chaplain Ken Bowers began pre-race ceremonies, by giving the invocation. Actress Emmy Rossum then performed the national anthem, and Olympian Apolo Anton Ohno gave the command for drivers to start their engines. Before the start of the race, a competition caution was scheduled for the 40th lap in the race.

Edwards retained his pole position lead into the first corner, followed by Kurt Busch, who started second. However, by the end of the first lap, Busch was the leader. Two laps later, Edwards fell to the third position, as Kyle Busch passed him. On the fifth lap, Logano moved into the fourth position. On the following lap, Kyle Busch became the leader after passing his brother Kurt. By lap eight, Kurt Busch had fallen to third once Edwards overtook him for second. On lap nine, McMurray moved to sixth, as Keselowski fell to 11th. Ten laps later, Edwards reclaimed the first position, as the first caution was given because of debris on the track. The front-runners made pit stops during the caution, so Kurt Busch became the leader. At the lap 26 restart, Kurt Busch was the leader, as Joe Nemechek retired from the race. By the following lap, Hamlin had moved up to the second position, as Brian Vickers claimed third. On the 32nd lap, Hamlin became the leader. Two laps later, Robby Gordon spun sideways, prompting the second caution to be given. The caution was announced to replace the competition caution. Most of the front runners made pit stops during the caution. At the lap 38 restart, Edwards was the leader, ahead of Clint Bowyer and Kurt Busch.

On the following lap, Bowyer fell to third. At the end of lap 45, Edwards remained the leader, ahead Kurt Busch and Burton. By the 48th lap, Gordon had moved up 15 positions since the beginning of the race. On the 50th lap, the third caution was given after Bayne collided with the wall, sustaining major damage. Most drivers made pit stops during the caution. At the lap 55 restart, Kurt Busch was the leader, while Edwards fell to 15th. On lap 56, Matt Kenseth up moved to second, as Tony Stewart up moved to the third position. On the following lap, Marcos Ambrose moved up to the fifth position. On the 67th lap, the caution was given because of an accident involving 13 drivers. Afterward, the red flag was waved to help the officials to continue removing debris. At the lap 72 restart, Hamlin was the leader, ahead of Newman, and Menard. Dale Earnhardt Jr. had to restart last, after getting a penalty for excessive speed on pit row. Three laps later, Newman overtook the lead after passing Hamlin, as Gordon moved up to second. On the 77th lap, Gordon passed Newman to become the leader, as his teammate Johnson passed Kyle Busch to move the 11th position. On the following lap, Hamlin fell to third. On the next lap, Stewart passed Hamlin to claim third.

By lap 84, Gordon had a 1.5-second lead over Newman; however, after one lap, Newman reclaimed the position. Gordon continued to lose positions as Stewart moved to second. On lap 91, Stewart passed Newman to move to the first position. Four laps later, Truex Jr. moved up to the third position. At lap 98, Stewart remained the leader, followed by Newman, Gordon, and Truex. After the 100th lap, Stewart maintained a 1.8-second lead. Four laps later, Gordon moved to the second position. On lap 109, Johnson claimed the sixth position, as Bowyer and Robby Gordon returned to the race. On the 116th lap, both David Reutimann and Edwards returned to the race, after being in the garage. On lap 125, Gordon reclaimed the first position from Stewart. Two laps later, Ragan collided with the wall, prompting the sixth caution to be given. During the caution, most of the front-runners made pit stops. At the lap 133 restart, Stewart was the leader followed by Gordon, Johnson, Kurt Busch, and Harvick.

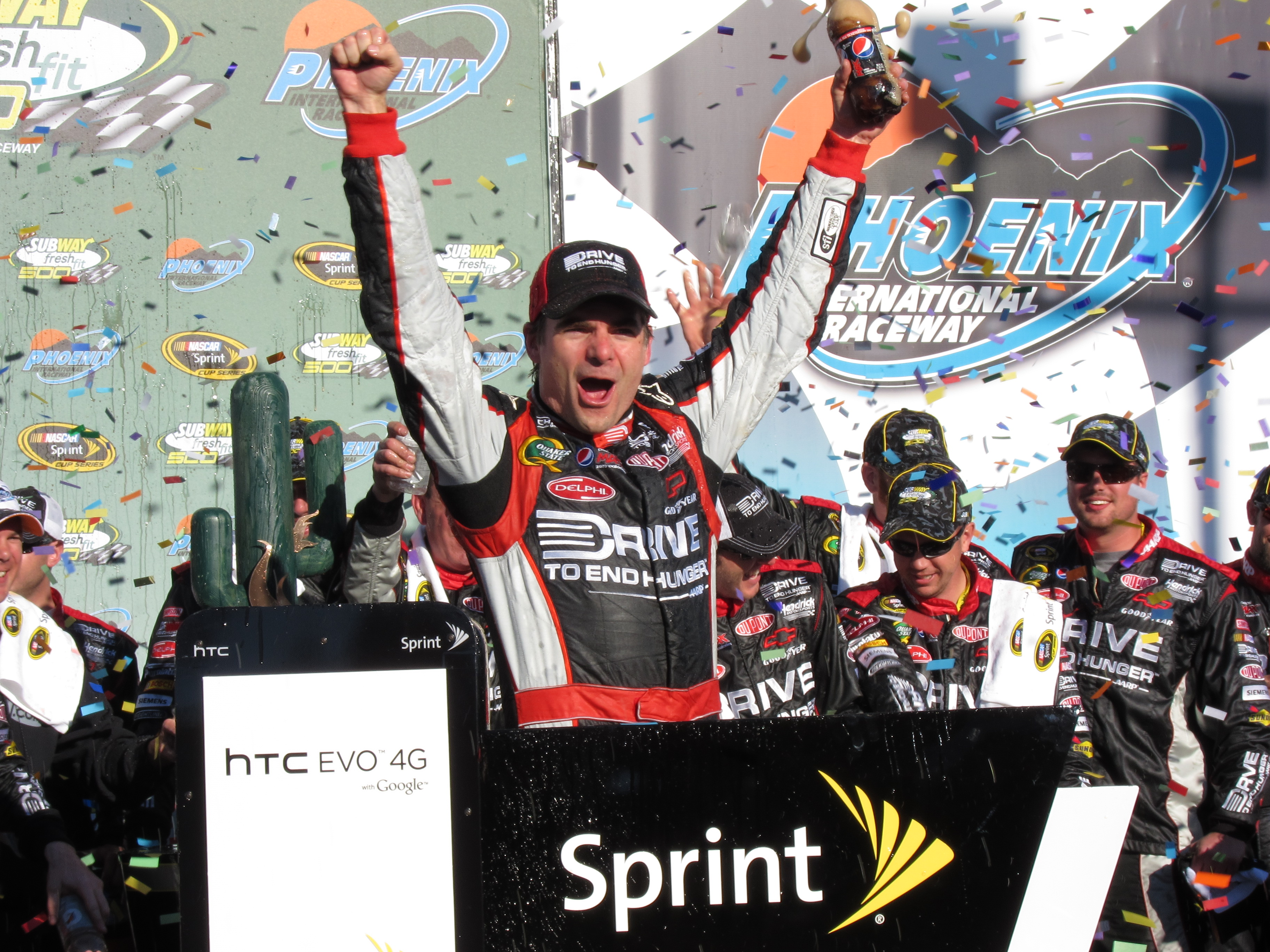
Jeff Gordon won the race, his first during the season.

Six laps later, Vickers returned to the race, as Gordon passed Stewart for the first position. On lap 144, Bowyer returned to the race. Four laps later, Allmendinger moved into the ninth position. On the 150th lap, Kurt Busch moved the fourth position. By lap 160, Hamlin moved to eleventh, while Allmendinger moved down to tenth. Twelve laps later, Kyle Busch passed his brother Kurt for the fourth position, as Stewart claimed first. On the 176th lap, Johnson moved to the second position. Eight laps later, Johnson became the leader, as Stewart made a pit stop. On lap 190, Johnson, Jeff Gordon, Newman, Kurt Busch and Hamlin made a pit stop, and Kenseth became the leader. After the green flag pit stops concluded, Johnson continued to be the leader, ahead of Stewart, Gordon, Kyle Busch, and Harvick. By the 201st lap, Stewart fell to fourth, as Gordon and Kyle Busch moved up to the second and third positions.

Four laps later, Gordon passed Johnson to become the leader. On lap 218, the seventh caution was given after Logano's engine failed. Most of the front-runners made pit stops during the caution. At the lap 225 restart, Gordon was the leader, ahead of Kyle Busch, Harvick, and Stewart, while Johnson restarted in ninth, after having an 18-second pit stop. By lap 236, Johnson had moved up to the fifth position. Four laps later, Dale Earnhardt Jr. made pit stops because of a loose wheel. By lap 244, Gordon had a 1.1 second lead over Kyle Busch. Gordon continued to increase his lead over the second position, while Martin passed Menard for the 11th position. On the following lap, Stewart moved into the third position. By the 277th lap, Gordon had a 1.8 second lead over Kyle Busch in second. On lap 282, Kyle Busch made a pit stops, one lap before Gordon, Stewart, and Harvick made pit stops. On lap 284, Johnson made a pit stop, as the eighth caution was given after Andy Lally collided with the wall. At the lap 290 restart, Stewart was the leader, ahead of Kyle Busch, Gordon, and Johnson.

On the following lap, Kyle Busch became the leader, as Stewart fell to third. On the 294th lap, Johnson passed Stewart to claim the third position. Nine laps later, Gordon passed Kyle Busch to become the leader. Gordon maintained the lead to win his first race of the 2011 season. Kyle Busch finished second, ahead of Johnson in third and Harvick in fourth. Newman clinched the fifth position, after starting 14th.

=== Post-race ===
"Are you kidding me? Pinch me man, pinch me. God, it feels so amazing. I can't tell you how amazing this feels."

— Jeff Gordon, speaking after the race.

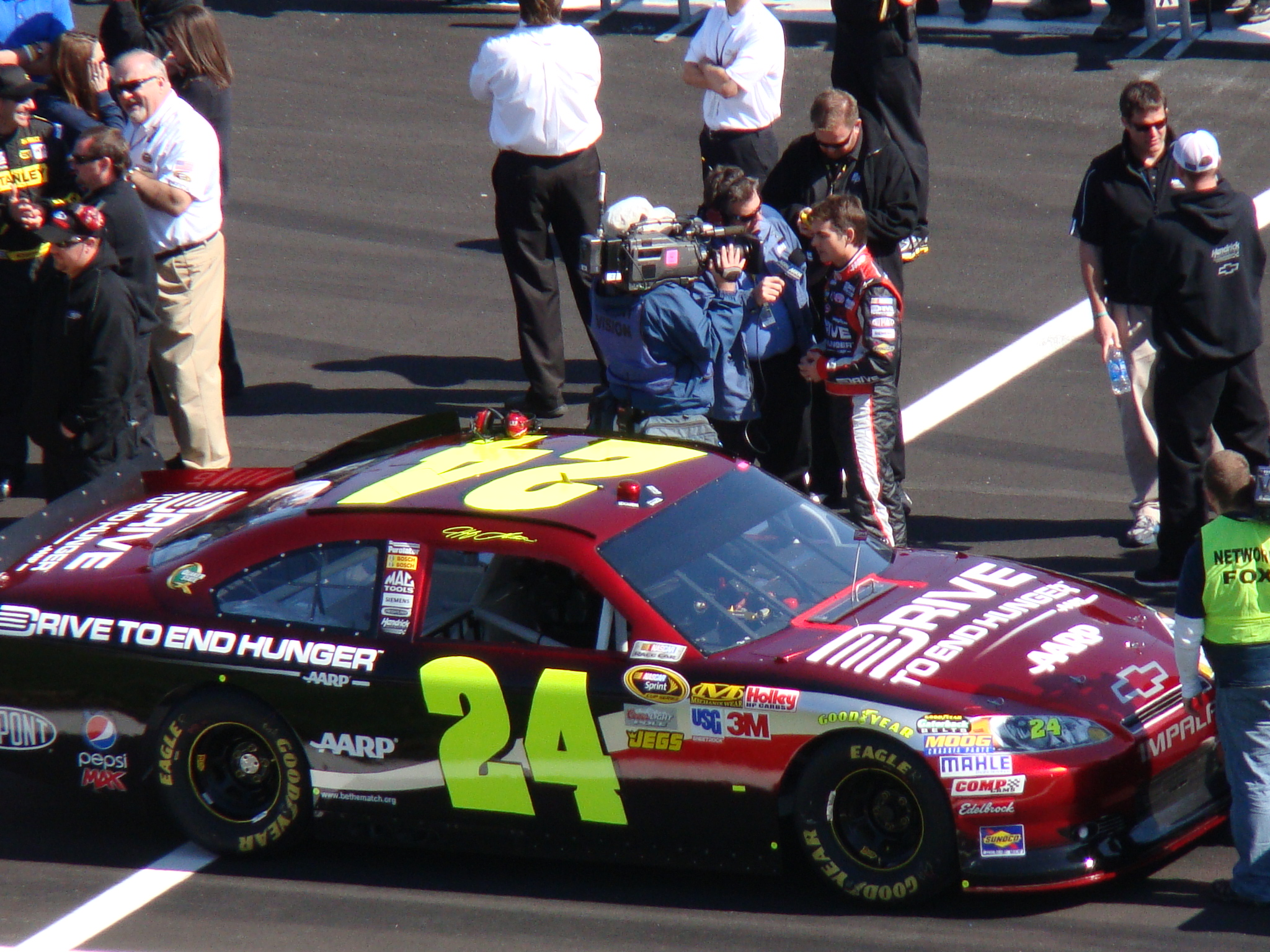
The winning race car, driven by Jeff Gordon

Gordon appeared in victory lane after his victory lap to start celebrating his first win of the season, and his second Sprint Cup win at Phoenix International Raceway, in front of a crowd of 75,000 people. "I was feeling the emotions, but to see (the fans) react like that. Then the push truck pushed me around and to see them all the way down (the frontstretch) doing that, I was like, ‘I don't know if I've ever experienced something like that.’ And that to me made it all worth it right there to have that feeling," said Gordon of his triumph.

Kyle Busch, who finished second, said, "He was on a mission today, that's for sure. When Jeff Gordon has a good car and he has the opportunity to beat you, he's going to beat you. He's my hero. I've always watched him and what he's been able to accomplish over the years." In the subsequent press conference, pole position winner, Edwards, stated his frustration at his accident, "I’m not exactly sure what happened. I’ll have to talk to Kyle about it. I thought at first he was just frustrated and he turned left to get back in line and he didn’t know I was there, but I watched the tape and I think he really did get loose. He hit me hard and I was left with nothing. I got rammed to the infield." Rick Hendrick, the owner of Hendrick Motorsports, expressed his enjoyment of winning the race, stating, "When you're a champion like Jeff Gordon, you know you can still do it, (even) when people overlook you. He's been right there but he hasn't had that edge. I think we're going to see a lot of momentum out of that team right now."

The race result left Kyle Busch leading the Driver's Championship with 80 points. Kurt Busch, who finished eighth, was second with 77, eight points ahead of Stewart and Allmendinger. Gordon was fifth with 65 points. Ford maintained their lead in the Manufacturers' Championship with 12 points. Toyota and Chevrolet placed second and third with the same number of points, four ahead of Dodge in fourth. 10.36 million people watched the race on television. The race took three hours, one minute and forty-nine seconds to complete, and the margin of victory was 1.137 seconds.

== Results ==
=== Qualifying ===
No.	Driver	Team	Manufacturer	Time	Speed	Grid
99	Carl Edwards	Roush Fenway Racing	Ford	26.224	137.279	1
22	Kurt Busch	Penske Racing	Dodge	26.256	137.111	2
4	Kasey Kahne	Red Bull Racing Team	Toyota	26.259	137.096	3
18	Kyle Busch	Joe Gibbs Racing	Toyota	26.281	136.981	4
78	Regan Smith	Furniture Row Racing	Chevrolet	26.283	136.971	5
20	Joey Logano	Joe Gibbs Racing	Toyota	26.288	136.945	6
56	Martin Truex Jr.	Michael Waltrip Racing	Toyota	26.314	136.809	7
1	Jamie McMurray	Earnhardt Ganassi Racing	Chevrolet	26.321	136.773	8
2	Brad Keselowski	Penske Racing	Dodge	26.322	136.768	9
16	Greg Biffle	Roush Fenway Racing	Ford	26.340	136.674	10
6	David Ragan	Roush Fenway Racing	Ford	26.346	136.643	11
11	Denny Hamlin	Joe Gibbs Racing	Toyota	26.358	136.581	12
27	Paul Menard	Richard Childress Racing	Chevrolet	26.362	136.560	13
39	Ryan Newman	Stewart–Haas Racing	Chevrolet	26.382	136.457	14
43	A. J. Allmendinger	Richard Petty Motorsports	Ford	26.392	136.405	15
33	Clint Bowyer	Richard Childress Racing	Chevrolet	26.407	136.327	16
29	Kevin Harvick	Richard Childress Racing	Chevrolet	26.448	136.116	17
14	Tony Stewart	Stewart–Haas Racing	Chevrolet	26.459	136.060	18
83	Brian Vickers	Red Bull Racing Team	Toyota	26.471	135.998	19
24	Jeff Gordon	Hendrick Motorsports	Chevrolet	26.515	135.772	20
47	Bobby Labonte	JTG Daugherty Racing	Toyota	26.523	135.731	21
42	Juan Pablo Montoya	Earnhardt Ganassi Racing	Chevrolet	26.529	135.701	22
5	Mark Martin	Hendrick Motorsports	Chevrolet	26.547	135.609	23
17	Matt Kenseth	Roush Fenway Racing	Ford	26.553	135.578	24
31	Jeff Burton	Richard Childress Racing	Chevrolet	26.556	135.563	25
00	David Reutimann	Michael Waltrip Racing	Toyota	26.557	135.557	26
13	Casey Mears	Germain Racing	Toyota	26.563	135.527	27
48	Jimmie Johnson	Hendrick Motorsports	Chevrolet	26.569	135.496	28
34	David Gilliland	Front Row Motorsports	Ford	26.574	135.471	29
9	Marcos Ambrose	Richard Petty Motorsports	Ford	26.574	135.471	30
7	Robby Gordon	Robby Gordon Motorsports	Dodge	26.621	135.232	31
87	Joe Nemechek	NEMCO Motorsports	Toyota	26.680	134.932	32
21	Trevor Bayne	Wood Brothers Racing	Ford	26.715	134.756	33
66	Michael McDowell	HP Racing	Toyota	26.729	134.685	34
88	Dale Earnhardt Jr.	Hendrick Motorsports	Chevrolet	26.731	134.675	35
32	Mike Skinner	FAS Lane Racing	Ford	26.811	134.273	36
60	Landon Cassill	Germain Racing	Toyota	26.856	134.048	37
46	J. J. Yeley	Whitney Motorsports	Chevrolet	26.857	134.043	38
09	Bill Elliott	Phoenix Racing	Chevrolet	26.909	133.784	39
38	Travis Kvapil	Front Row Motorsports	Ford	26.988	133.393	40
36	Dave Blaney	Tommy Baldwin Racing	Chevrolet	26.996	133.353	41
71	Andy Lally	TRG Motorsports	Chevrolet	27.288	131.926	42
37	Tony Raines	Front Row Motorsports	Ford	27.343	131.661	43
Failed to Qualify
92	Brian Keselowski	K-Automotive Motorsports	Dodge	27.431	131.238	

=== Race results ===
Pos	Grid	Car	Driver	Team	Manufacturer	Laps Run	Points
1	20	24	Jeff Gordon	Hendrick Motorsports	Chevrolet	312	48^{2}^{3}
2	4	18	Kyle Busch	Joe Gibbs Racing	Toyota	312	43^{1}
3	28	48	Jimmie Johnson	Hendrick Motorsports	Chevrolet	312	42^{1}
4	17	29	Kevin Harvick	Richard Childress Racing	Chevrolet	312	41^{1}
5	14	39	Ryan Newman	Stewart–Haas Racing	Chevrolet	312	40^{1}
6	3	4	Kasey Kahne	Red Bull Racing Team	Toyota	312	38
7	18	14	Tony Stewart	Stewart–Haas Racing	Chevrolet	312	38^{1}
8	2	22	Kurt Busch	Penske Racing	Dodge	312	37^{1}
9	15	43	A. J. Allmendinger	Richard Petty Motorsports	Ford	312	35
10	35	88	Dale Earnhardt Jr.	Hendrick Motorsports	Chevrolet	312	34
11	12	11	Denny Hamlin	Joe Gibbs Racing	Toyota	312	34^{1}
12	24	17	Matt Kenseth	Roush Fenway Racing	Ford	312	33^{1}
13	23	5	Mark Martin	Hendrick Motorsports	Chevrolet	312	31
14	7	56	Martin Truex Jr.	Michael Waltrip Racing	Toyota	312	30
15	9	2	Brad Keselowski	Penske Racing	Dodge	311	29
16	30	9	Marcos Ambrose	Richard Petty Motorsports	Ford	311	28
17	13	27	Paul Menard	Richard Childress Racing	Chevrolet	311	27
18	27	13	Casey Mears	Germain Racing	Toyota	311	26
19	22	42	Juan Pablo Montoya	Earnhardt Ganassi Racing	Chevrolet	311	25
20	10	16	Greg Biffle	Roush Fenway Racing	Ford	311	24
21	21	47	Bobby Labonte	JTG Daugherty Racing	Toyota	310	23
22	29	34	David Gilliland	Front Row Motorsports	Ford	310	22
23	39	09	Bill Elliott	Phoenix Racing	Chevrolet	309	21
24	36	32	Mike Skinner	FAS Lane Racing	Ford	308	0^{4}
25	42	37	Tony Raines	Front Row Motorsports	Ford	306	19
26	25	31	Jeff Burton	Richard Childress Racing	Chevrolet	276	18
27	16	33	Clint Bowyer	Richard Childress Racing	Chevrolet	260	17
28	1	99	Carl Edwards	Roush Fenway Racing	Ford	252	17^{1}
29	26	00	David Reutimann	Michael Waltrip Racing	Toyota	246	15
30	19	83	Brian Vickers	Red Bull Racing Team	Toyota	238	14
31	41	71	Andy Lally	TRG Motorsports	Chevrolet	237	14^{1}
32	31	7	Robby Gordon	Robby Gordon Motorsports	Dodge	236	12
33	6	20	Joey Logano	Joe Gibbs Racing	Toyota	213	11
34	5	78	Regan Smith	Furniture Row Racing	Chevrolet	213	10
35	8	1	Jamie McMurray	Earnhardt Ganassi Racing	Chevrolet	126	9
36	11	6	David Ragan	Roush Fenway Racing	Ford	125	8
37	38	46	J. J. Yeley	Whitney Motorsports	Chevrolet	72	7
38	37	60	Landon Cassill	Germain Racing	Toyota	68	0^{4}
39	40	38	Travis Kvapil	Front Row Motorsports	Ford	66	0^{4}
40	33	21	Trevor Bayne	Wood Brothers Racing	Ford	49	0^{4}
41	34	66	Michael McDowell	HP Racing	Toyota	43	4^{1}
42	43	36	Dave Blaney	Tommy Baldwin Racing	Chevrolet	27	2
43	32	87	Joe Nemechek	NEMCO Motorsports	Toyota	22	0
^{1} Includes one bonus point for leading a lap
^{2} Includes two bonus points for leading the most laps
^{3} Includes three bonus points for winning the race
^{4} Ineligible for championship points

== Standings after the race ==
Drivers' Championship standings

Pos	Driver	Points
1	Kyle Busch	80
2	Kurt Busch	77
3	Tony Stewart	69
4	A. J. Allmendinger	69
5	Jeff Gordon	65

Manufacturers' Championship standings

Pos	Manufacturer	Points
1	Ford	12
2	Toyota	12
3	Chevrolet	12
4	Dodge	8

- Note: Only the top five positions are included for the driver standings.

Previous race: 2011 Daytona 500	Sprint Cup Series; 2011 season	Next race: 2011 Kobalt Tools 400
