= 2013 Camping World RV Sales 301 =

Race details
- Race 19 of 36 in the 2013 NASCAR Sprint Cup Series
- Date: July 14, 2013
- Location: New Hampshire Motor Speedway, Loudon, New Hampshire, United States
- Course: Permanent racing facility
- Course length: 1.058 miles (1.703 km)
- Distance: 302 laps, 319.516 mi (514.211 km)
- Scheduled distance: 301 laps, 318.458 mi (512.508 km)
- Weather: Hot with temperatures approaching 89.1 °F (31.7 °C); wind speeds up to 7 miles per hour (11 km/h)
- Average speed: 98.735 mph (158.899 km/h)

Pole position
Driver	Brad Keselowski	Penske Racing
- Time: 28.022 seconds

Most laps led
Driver	Kurt Busch	Furniture Row Racing
- Laps: 102

Winner
No. 55	Brian Vickers	Michael Waltrip Racing

Television in the United States
- Network: TNT
- Announcers: Adam Alexander, Wally Dallenbach Jr. and Kyle Petty
- Nielsen ratings: 3.2/8 (4.907 million viewers)

The 2013 Camping World RV Sales 301 was a NASCAR Sprint Cup Series stock car race held on July 14, 2013, at New Hampshire Motor Speedway in Loudon, New Hampshire, United States. Contested over 302 laps, it was the nineteenth race of the 2013 NASCAR Sprint Cup Series season. Brian Vickers of Michael Waltrip Racing won the race, his third career and final Sprint Cup win, while Kyle Busch finished second. Jeff Burton, Brad Keselowski, and Aric Almirola rounded out the top five.

== Report ==
=== Background ===
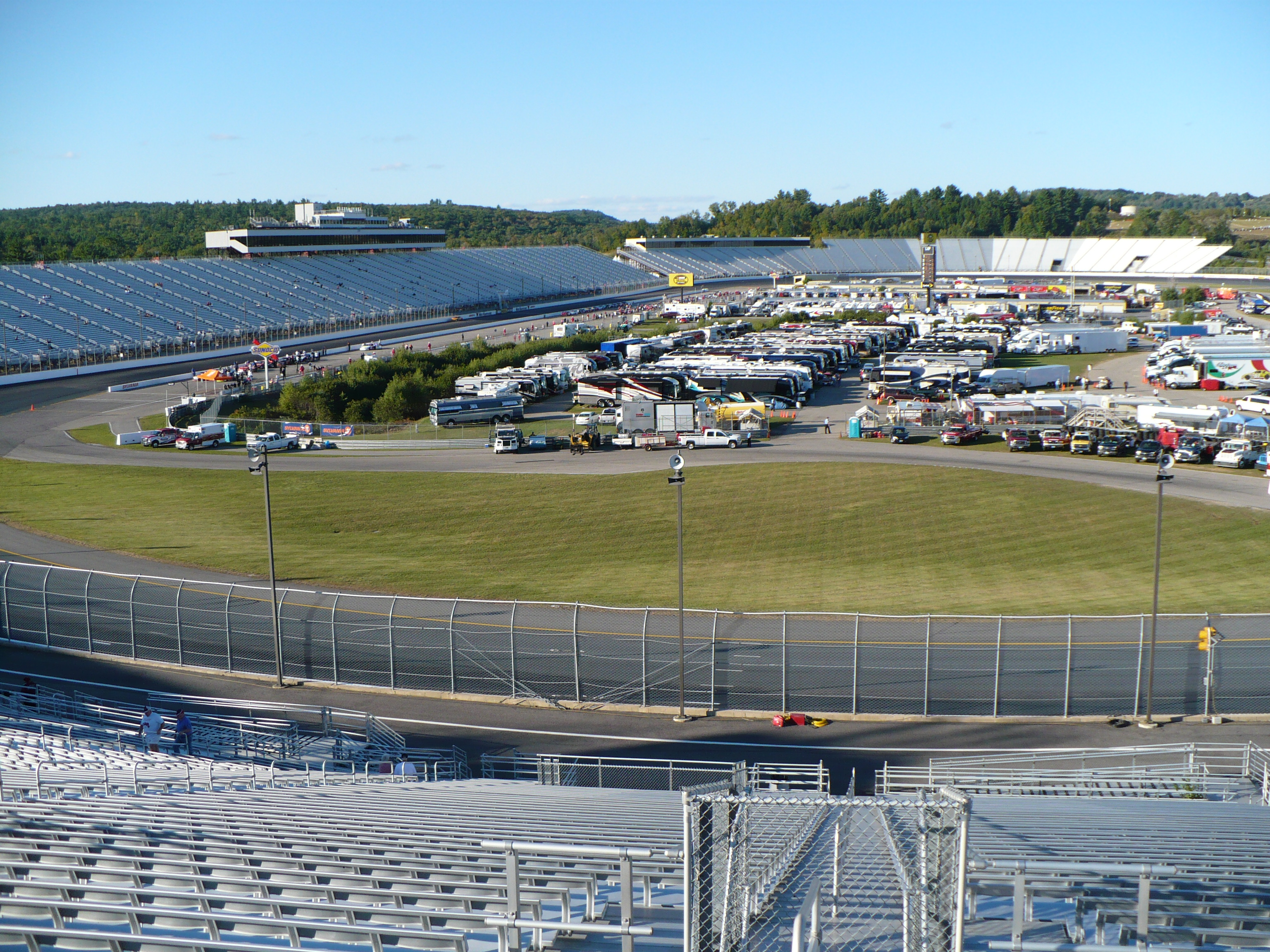
New Hampshire Motor Speedway's infield and front straightaway from turn two grandstands.

New Hampshire Motor Speedway opened on June 5, 1990, as a four-turn oval track, 1.058 miles (1.703 km) long. The track's turns are banked at two to seven degrees, while the front stretch, the finish line, and the back stretch are banked at one degree and are 1,500 feet in length. The track has a grandstand seating capacity of 93,521 spectators. Kasey Kahne was the defending race winner.

Before the race, Jimmie Johnson was leading the Drivers' Championship with 658 points, while Clint Bowyer stood in second with 609 points. Carl Edwards followed in third with 587, two points ahead of Kevin Harvick and thirty-nine ahead of Dale Earnhardt Jr. in fourth and fifth. Matt Kenseth, with 540, was in sixth; seven points ahead of Kyle Busch, who was scored seventh. Eighth-placed Greg Biffle was fifteen points ahead of Kurt Busch and seventeen ahead of Tony Stewart in ninth and tenth. Martin Truex Jr. was eleventh with 493, while Kahne completed the first twelve positions with 490 points. In the Manufacturers' Championship, Chevrolet was leading with 128 points, twelve points ahead of Toyota. Ford was third with 91 points.

=== Entry list ===
(R) - Denotes rookie driver.

(i) - Denotes driver who is ineligible for series driver points.

No.	Driver	Team	Manufacturer
1	Jamie McMurray	Earnhardt Ganassi Racing	Chevrolet
2	Brad Keselowski	Penske Racing	Ford
5	Kasey Kahne	Hendrick Motorsports	Chevrolet
7	Dave Blaney	Tommy Baldwin Racing	Chevrolet
9	Marcos Ambrose	Richard Petty Motorsports	Ford
10	Danica Patrick (R)	Stewart–Haas Racing	Chevrolet
11	Denny Hamlin	Joe Gibbs Racing	Toyota
13	Casey Mears	Germain Racing	Ford
14	Tony Stewart	Stewart–Haas Racing	Chevrolet
15	Clint Bowyer	Michael Waltrip Racing	Toyota
16	Greg Biffle	Roush Fenway Racing	Ford
17	Ricky Stenhouse Jr. (R)	Roush Fenway Racing	Ford
18	Kyle Busch	Joe Gibbs Racing	Toyota
19	Mike Bliss (i)	Humphrey Smith Racing	Toyota
20	Matt Kenseth	Joe Gibbs Racing	Toyota
22	Joey Logano	Penske Racing	Ford
24	Jeff Gordon	Hendrick Motorsports	Chevrolet
27	Paul Menard	Richard Childress Racing	Chevrolet
29	Kevin Harvick	Richard Childress Racing	Chevrolet
30	David Stremme	Swan Racing	Toyota
31	Jeff Burton	Richard Childress Racing	Chevrolet
32	Ken Schrader	FAS Lane Racing	Ford
33	Landon Cassill (i)	Circle Sport	Chevrolet
34	David Ragan	Front Row Motorsports	Ford
35	Josh Wise (i)	Front Row Motorsports	Ford
36	J. J. Yeley	Tommy Baldwin Racing	Chevrolet
38	David Gilliland	Front Row Motorsports	Ford
39	Ryan Newman	Stewart–Haas Racing	Chevrolet
42	Juan Pablo Montoya	Earnhardt Ganassi Racing	Chevrolet
43	Aric Almirola	Richard Petty Motorsports	Ford
47	Bobby Labonte	JTG Daugherty Racing	Toyota
48	Jimmie Johnson	Hendrick Motorsports	Chevrolet
51	A. J. Allmendinger	Phoenix Racing	Chevrolet
52	Morgan Shepherd (i)	Brian Keselowski Motorsports	Toyota
55	Brian Vickers (i)	Michael Waltrip Racing	Toyota
56	Martin Truex Jr.	Michael Waltrip Racing	Toyota
78	Kurt Busch	Furniture Row Racing	Chevrolet
83	David Reutimann	BK Racing	Toyota
87	Joe Nemechek (i)	NEMCO-Jay Robinson Racing	Toyota
88	Dale Earnhardt Jr.	Hendrick Motorsports	Chevrolet
93	Travis Kvapil	BK Racing	Toyota
98	Michael McDowell	Phil Parsons Racing	Ford
99	Carl Edwards	Roush Fenway Racing	Ford
Official entry list

=== Practice and qualifying ===
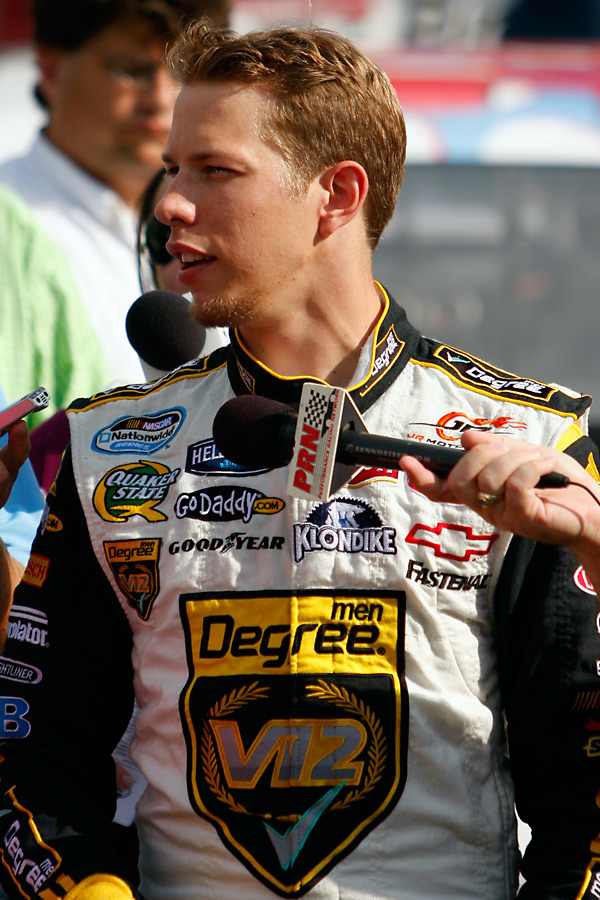
Brad Keselowski won the pole position

Three practice sessions were held before the race. The first session, scheduled on July 12, 2013, was 90 minutes long. The second and third, held a day later on July 13, 2013, were 55 and 60 minutes long. In the first practice session, Brad Keselowski was the quickest with a best lap time of 28.111 seconds. Kyle Busch followed in second, ahead of Denny Hamlin and Jamie McMurray in third and fourth. Earnhardt Jr. was scored fifth quickest with a best lap time of 28.369, 258 thousandths of a second slower than Keselowski. Gordon, Johnson, Kurt Busch, Edwards, and Bowyer completed the top-ten.

During the qualifying session, Keselowski recorded his third career pole position with a lap time of 28.022 seconds and a speed of 135.922 mph (218.745 km/h). Johnson had the second best lap time, but was disqualified because his car didn't meet height requirements, prompting him to start last of the forty-three car field. Kurt Busch, who completed his lap in 28.040 seconds, will start alongside Keselowski on the grid, in front of Earnhardt Jr., Kyle Busch, and Gordon. Edwards, with a lap time of 28.112 seconds, was scored sixth ahead of Hamlin and Kahne in seventh and eighth. Jeff Burton and Juan Pablo Montoya completed the first ten grid positions with lap times of 28.162 and 28.191.

In the Saturday morning session, Kurt Busch was quickest with a fastest lap time of 28.531 seconds, six-thousandths of a second faster than Kenseth in second. Kyle Busch managed to be third quickest with a fastest lap time of 28.563, 0.032 slower than his brother Kurt. Bowyer and Edwards followed in the fourth and fifth positions. Johnson, Joey Logano, Hamlin, Truex Jr., and Montoya completed the first ten positions. In the final practice session for the race, Brian Vickers was quickest with a time of 28.548 seconds and a best speed of 133.417 mph (214.714 km/h). Earnhardt Jr. followed in second, ahead of Kenseth and Bowyer in third and fourth. Johnson, who was sixth quickest in second practice, managed fifth.

=== Race ===
The second half of the season started with Brad Keselowski clinching the pole. Jimmie Johnson (who qualified second) was sent to the rear of the field for failing post-qualifying inspection. Keselowski led the first few laps, but relinquished the lead to Kyle Busch, who, in turn, lost it to Kurt Busch. As drivers came into and fell out of the top ten due to pit strategy, both Kurt and Kyle Busch, Matt Kenseth, Tony Stewart, and others took turns at the front.

Stewart led the majority of the last 100 laps, but Brian Vickers passed both Stewart and Kyle Busch with about 15 laps left. The race saw an unusually high amount of cautions, with the 12th of the day coming out with four to go to set up a green-white-checker finish. On the restart, Vickers held the lead over Stewart and Busch, but coming to the white flag, Stewart ran out of fuel. This allowed Vickers to take his third career win over Kyle Busch, Jeff Burton, Keselowski, and Aric Almirola. Morgan Shepherd, who qualified and finished 41st, became the oldest driver to compete in the Sprint Cup Series at age 71.

== Results ==
=== Qualifying ===
Grid	No.	Driver	Team	Manufacturer	Time	Speed
1	2	Brad Keselowski	Penske Racing	Ford	28.022	135.922
2	78	Kurt Busch	Furniture Row Racing	Chevrolet	28.040	135.835
3	88	Dale Earnhardt Jr.	Hendrick Motorsports	Chevrolet	28.050	135.786
4	18	Kyle Busch	Joe Gibbs Racing	Toyota	28.056	135.757
5	24	Jeff Gordon	Hendrick Motorsports	Chevrolet	28.104	135.525
6	99	Carl Edwards	Roush Fenway Racing	Ford	28.112	135.487
7	11	Denny Hamlin	Joe Gibbs Racing	Toyota	28.113	135.482
8	5	Kasey Kahne	Hendrick Motorsports	Chevrolet	28.144	135.333
9	31	Jeff Burton	Richard Childress Racing	Chevrolet	28.162	135.246
10	42	Juan Pablo Montoya	Earnhardt Ganassi Racing	Chevrolet	28.191	135.107
11	1	Jamie McMurray	Earnhardt Ganassi Racing	Chevrolet	28.198	135.073
12	20	Matt Kenseth	Joe Gibbs Racing	Toyota	28.212	135.006
13	55	Brian Vickers	Michael Waltrip Racing	Toyota	28.218	134.978
14	27	Paul Menard	Richard Childress Racing	Chevrolet	28.241	134.868
15	39	Ryan Newman	Stewart–Haas Racing	Chevrolet	28.245	134.849
16	14	Tony Stewart	Stewart–Haas Racing	Chevrolet	28.265	134.753
17	43	Aric Almirola	Richard Petty Motorsports	Ford	28.274	134.710
18	29	Kevin Harvick	Richard Childress Racing	Chevrolet	28.320	134.492
19	56	Martin Truex Jr.	Michael Waltrip Racing	Toyota	28.337	134.411
20	15	Clint Bowyer	Michael Waltrip Racing	Toyota	28.405	134.089
21	9	Marcos Ambrose	Richard Petty Motorsports	Ford	28.418	134.028
22	16	Greg Biffle	Roush Fenway Racing	Ford	28.458	133.839
23	17	Ricky Stenhouse Jr.	Roush Fenway Racing	Ford	28.459	133.835
24	38	David Gilliland	Front Row Motorsports	Ford	28.462	133.821
25	22	Joey Logano	Penske Racing	Ford	28.471	133.778
26	51	A. J. Allmendinger	Phoenix Racing	Chevrolet	28.471	133.778
27	83	David Reutimann	BK Racing	Toyota	28.501	133.637
28	13	Casey Mears	Germain Racing	Ford	28.545	133.431
29	34	David Ragan	Front Row Motorsports	Ford	28.579	133.273
30	98	Michael McDowell	Phil Parsons Racing	Ford	28.639	132.993
31	93	Travis Kvapil	BK Racing	Toyota	28.655	132.919
32	10	Danica Patrick	Stewart–Haas Racing	Chevrolet	28.658	132.905
33	47	Bobby Labonte	JTG Daugherty Racing	Toyota	28.698	132.720
34	19	Mike Bliss	Humphrey Smith Motorsports	Toyota	28.749	132.485
35	35	Josh Wise	Front Row Motorsports	Ford	28.854	132.002
36	33	Landon Cassill	Circle Sport	Chevrolet	28.881	131.879
37	32	Ken Schrader	FAS Lane Racing	Ford	28.953	131.551
38	87	Joe Nemechek	NEMCO-Jay Robinson Racing	Toyota	29.048	131.121
39	7	Dave Blaney	Tommy Baldwin Racing	Chevrolet	29.053	131.098
40	36	J. J. Yeley	Tommy Baldwin Racing	Chevrolet	29.120	130.797
41	52	Morgan Shepherd	Brian Keselowski Motorsports	Toyota	29.689	128.290
42	30	David Stremme	Swan Racing	Toyota	—	
43	48	Jimmie Johnson	Hendrick Motorsports	Chevrolet	Time disallowed	

==== Notes ====
1. David Stremme hit the wall in turn 2 of his qualifying lap, failing to complete it.
2. Jimmie Johnson initially qualified 2nd, but his time was disallowed when his car was found to be too low during post-qualifying inspection.

=== Race results ===
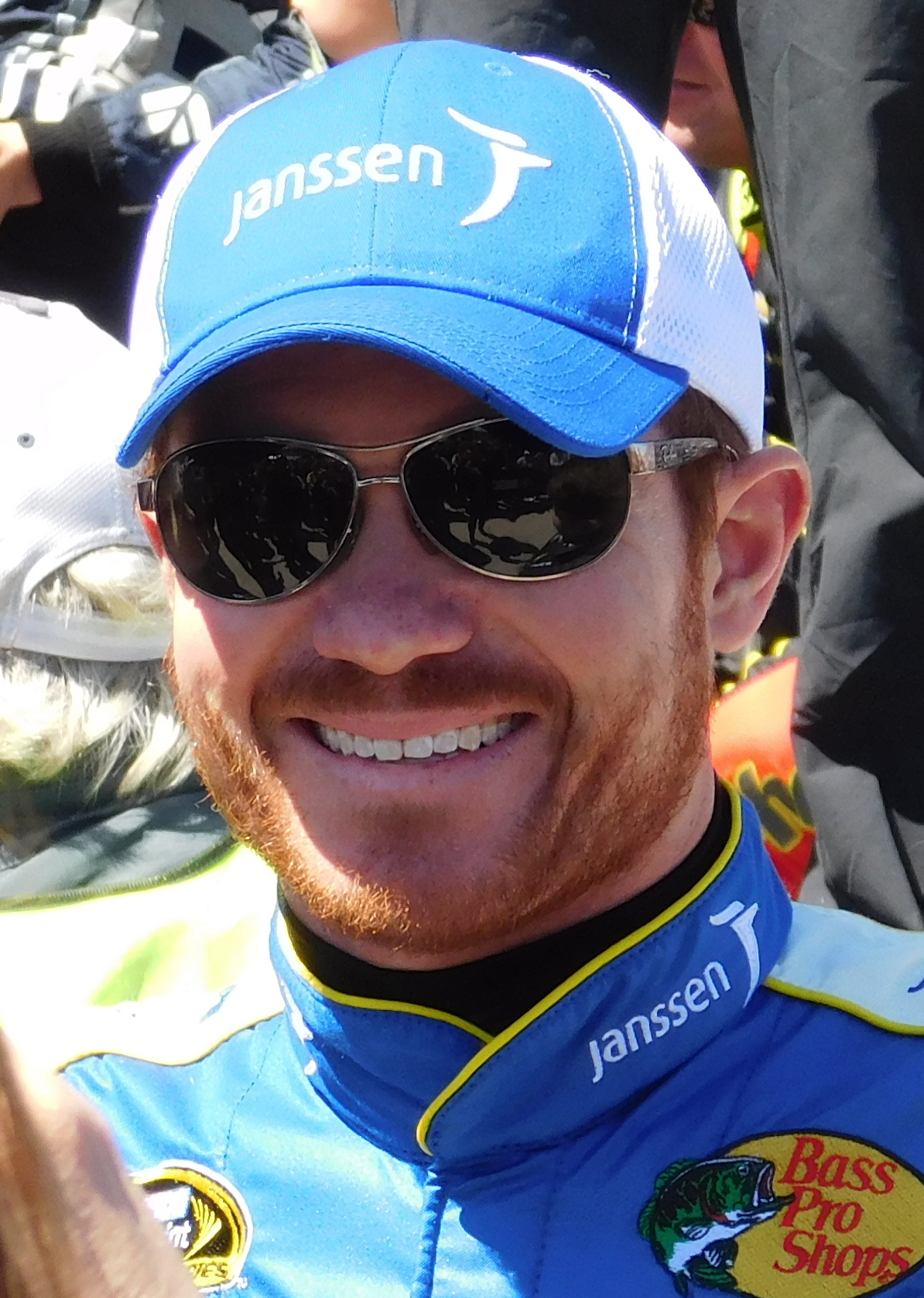
Brian Vickers won the race.

Pos	No.	Driver	Team	Manufacturer	Laps	Led	Points^{1}
1	55	Brian Vickers	Michael Waltrip Racing	Toyota	302	16	0^{[2]}
2	18	Kyle Busch	Joe Gibbs Racing	Toyota	302	53	43
3	31	Jeff Burton	Richard Childress Racing	Chevrolet	302	0	41
4	2	Brad Keselowski	Penske Racing	Ford	302	14	41
5	43	Aric Almirola	Richard Petty Motorsports	Ford	302	0	39
6	48	Jimmie Johnson	Hendrick Motorsports	Chevrolet	302	0	38
7	29	Kevin Harvick	Richard Childress Racing	Chevrolet	302	0	37
8	99	Carl Edwards	Roush Fenway Racing	Ford	302	0	36
9	20	Matt Kenseth	Joe Gibbs Racing	Toyota	302	33	36
10	24	Jeff Gordon	Hendrick Motorsports	Chevrolet	302	0	34
11	5	Kasey Kahne	Hendrick Motorsports	Chevrolet	302	0	33
12	1	Jamie McMurray	Earnhardt Ganassi Racing	Chevrolet	302	0	32
13	15	Clint Bowyer	Michael Waltrip Racing	Toyota	302	0	31
14	88	Dale Earnhardt Jr.	Hendrick Motorsports	Chevrolet	302	0	30
15	16	Greg Biffle	Roush Fenway Racing	Ford	302	0	29
16	56	Martin Truex Jr.	Michael Waltrip Racing	Toyota	302	0	28
17	27	Paul Menard	Richard Childress Racing	Chevrolet	302	0	27
18	38	David Gilliland	Front Row Motorsports	Ford	302	0	26
19	34	David Ragan	Front Row Motorsports	Ford	302	0	25
20	30	David Stremme	Swan Racing	Toyota	302	0	24
21	11	Denny Hamlin	Joe Gibbs Racing	Toyota	302	0	23
22	51	A. J. Allmendinger	Phoenix Racing	Chevrolet	302	0	22
23	7	Dave Blaney	Tommy Baldwin Racing	Chevrolet	302	0	21
24	42	Juan Pablo Montoya	Earnhardt Ganassi Racing	Chevrolet	302	0	20
25	87	Joe Nemechek	NEMCO-Jay Robinson Racing	Toyota	302	0	0^{[2]}
26	14	Tony Stewart	Stewart–Haas Racing	Chevrolet	302	84	19
27	47	Bobby Labonte	JTG Daugherty Racing	Toyota	301	0	17
28	83	David Reutimann	BK Racing	Toyota	299	0	16
29	36	J. J. Yeley	Tommy Baldwin Racing	Chevrolet	298	0	15
30	32	Ken Schrader	FAS Lane Racing	Ford	298	0	14
31	78	Kurt Busch	Furniture Row Racing	Chevrolet	283	102	14
32	33	Landon Cassill	Circle Sport	Chevrolet	281	0	0^{[2]}
33	9	Marcos Ambrose	Richard Petty Motorsports	Ford	277	0	11
34	17	Ricky Stenhouse Jr.	Roush Fenway Racing	Ford	275	0	10
35	35	Josh Wise	Front Row Motorsports	Ford	270	0	0^{[2]}
36	13	Casey Mears	Germain Racing	Ford	242	0	8
37	10	Danica Patrick	Stewart–Haas Racing	Chevrolet	237	0	7
38	93	Travis Kvapil	BK Racing	Toyota	236	0	6
39	39	Ryan Newman	Stewart–Haas Racing	Chevrolet	225	0	5
40	22	Joey Logano	Penske Racing	Ford	211	0	4
41	52	Morgan Shepherd	Brian Keselowski Motorsports	Toyota	92	0	0^{[2]}
42	98	Michael McDowell	Phil Parsons Racing	Ford	89	0	2
43	19	Mike Bliss	Humphrey Smith Motorsports	Toyota	75	0	0^{[2]}

Notes
1. ^1 Points include 3 Chase for the Sprint Cup points for winning, 1 point for leading a lap, and 1 point for most laps led.
2. ^{a} ^{b} ^{c} ^{d} ^{e} ^{f} Ineligible for driver's championship points.

== Standings after the race ==
Drivers' Championship standings

Pos	Driver	Points
1	Jimmie Johnson	696
2	Clint Bowyer	640 (–56)
3	Carl Edwards	623 (–73)
4	Kevin Harvick	622 (–74)
5	Dale Earnhardt Jr.	578 (–118)

Manufacturers' Championship standings

Pos	Manufacturer	Points
1	Chevrolet	133
2	Toyota	125 (–8)
3	Ford	95 (–38)

- Note: Only the first twelve positions are included for the driver standings.

Previous race: 2013 Coke Zero 400	Sprint Cup Series; 2013 season	Next race: 2013 Brickyard 400
