= 2013 Coke Zero 400 =

Race details
- Race 18 of 36 in the 2013 NASCAR Sprint Cup Series
- 2013 Coke Zero program cover
- Date: July 6, 2013
- Official name: Coke Zero 400 Powered by Coca-Cola at Daytona
- Location: Daytona International Speedway in Daytona Beach, Florida
- Course: Permanent racing facility
- Course length: 2.5 miles (4.023 km)
- Distance: 161 laps, 402.5 mi (647.761 km)
- Scheduled distance: 160 laps, 400 mi (643.738 km)
- Weather: Temperatures reading up to 90 °F (32 °C); wind speeds up to 18 miles per hour (29 km/h)
- Average speed: 154.313 mph (248.343 km/h)

Pole position
Driver	Kyle Busch	Joe Gibbs Racing
- Time: 46.458 seconds

Most laps led
Driver	Jimmie Johnson	Hendrick Motorsports
- Laps: 94

Winner
No. 48	Jimmie Johnson	Hendrick Motorsports

Television in the United States
- Network: TNT
- Announcers: Adam Alexander, Wally Dallenbach Jr. and Kyle Petty
- Nielsen ratings: 3.2/7 (5.688 million viewers)

The 2013 Coke Zero 400 powered by Coca-Cola was a NASCAR Sprint Cup Series stock car race held on July 6, 2013, at Daytona International Speedway in Daytona Beach, Florida. Contested over 161 laps, it was the eighteenth race of the 2013 NASCAR Sprint Cup Series season. Jimmie Johnson of Hendrick Motorsports won the race, his fourth win of the season and his first Coke Zero 400 win, rendering him the first driver since Bobby Allison in 1982 to sweep the Daytona 500 and Coke Zero 400 in the same year. Tony Stewart finished second while Kevin Harvick, Clint Bowyer, and Michael Waltrip rounded out the top five.

== Report ==
=== Background ===
Daytona International Speedway, where the race was held.

Daytona International Speedway is a four-turn superspeedway that is 2.5 miles (4.0 km) long. The track's turns are banked at 31 degrees, while the front stretch, the location of the finish line, is banked at 18 degrees. The backstretch, which has a length of 3,000 feet, has minimal banking that is used for drainage. Tony Stewart was the defending race winner.

Before the race, Jimmie Johnson was leading the Drivers' Championship with 610 points, while Carl Edwards stood in second with 572 points. Bowyer followed in the third with 569, twenty-five points ahead of Kevin Harvick and forty-one ahead of Matt Kenseth in fourth and fifth. Dale Earnhardt Jr., with 512, was in sixth; twelve ahead of Kyle Busch, who was scored seventh. Eighth-placed Martin Truex Jr. was one point ahead of Greg Biffle and eleven ahead of Joey Logano in ninth and tenth. Kasey Kahne was eleventh with 478, while Jeff Gordon completed the first twelve positions with 477 points. In the Manufacturers' Championship, Chevrolet was leading with 119 points, nine points ahead of Toyota. Ford was third with 87 points.

=== Entry list ===
(R) - Denotes rookie driver.

(i) - Denotes driver who is ineligible for series driver points.

No.	Driver	Team	Manufacturer
1	Jamie McMurray	Earnhardt Ganassi Racing	Chevrolet
2	Brad Keselowski	Penske Racing	Ford
5	Kasey Kahne	Hendrick Motorsports	Chevrolet
7	Dave Blaney	Tommy Baldwin Racing	Chevrolet
9	Marcos Ambrose	Richard Petty Motorsports	Ford
10	Danica Patrick (R)	Stewart–Haas Racing	Chevrolet
11	Denny Hamlin	Joe Gibbs Racing	Toyota
13	Casey Mears	Germain Racing	Ford
14	Tony Stewart	Stewart–Haas Racing	Chevrolet
15	Clint Bowyer	Michael Waltrip Racing	Toyota
16	Greg Biffle	Roush Fenway Racing	Ford
17	Ricky Stenhouse Jr. (R)	Roush Fenway Racing	Ford
18	Kyle Busch	Joe Gibbs Racing	Toyota
20	Matt Kenseth	Joe Gibbs Racing	Toyota
21	Trevor Bayne (i)	Wood Brothers Racing	Ford
22	Joey Logano	Penske Racing	Ford
24	Jeff Gordon	Hendrick Motorsports	Chevrolet
27	Paul Menard	Richard Childress Racing	Chevrolet
29	Kevin Harvick	Richard Childress Racing	Chevrolet
30	David Stremme	Swan Racing	Toyota
31	Jeff Burton	Richard Childress Racing	Chevrolet
32	Terry Labonte	FAS Lane Racing	Ford
33	Landon Cassill (i)	Circle Sport	Chevrolet
34	David Ragan	Front Row Motorsports	Ford
35	Josh Wise (i)	Front Row Motorsports	Ford
36	J. J. Yeley	Tommy Baldwin Racing	Chevrolet
38	David Gilliland	Front Row Motorsports	Ford
39	Ryan Newman	Stewart–Haas Racing	Chevrolet
42	Juan Pablo Montoya	Earnhardt Ganassi Racing	Chevrolet
43	Aric Almirola	Richard Petty Motorsports	Ford
47	Bobby Labonte	JTG Daugherty Racing	Toyota
48	Jimmie Johnson	Hendrick Motorsports	Chevrolet
51	A. J. Allmendinger	Phoenix Racing	Chevrolet
55	Michael Waltrip	Michael Waltrip Racing	Toyota
56	Martin Truex Jr.	Michael Waltrip Racing	Toyota
78	Kurt Busch	Furniture Row Racing	Chevrolet
83	David Reutimann	BK Racing	Toyota
87	Joe Nemechek (i)	NEMCO-Jay Robinson Racing	Toyota
88	Dale Earnhardt Jr.	Hendrick Motorsports	Chevrolet
93	Travis Kvapil	BK Racing	Toyota
95	Scott Speed	Leavine Family Racing	Ford
98	Michael McDowell	Phil Parsons Racing	Ford
99	Carl Edwards	Roush Fenway Racing	Ford
Official entry list

=== Practice and qualifying ===
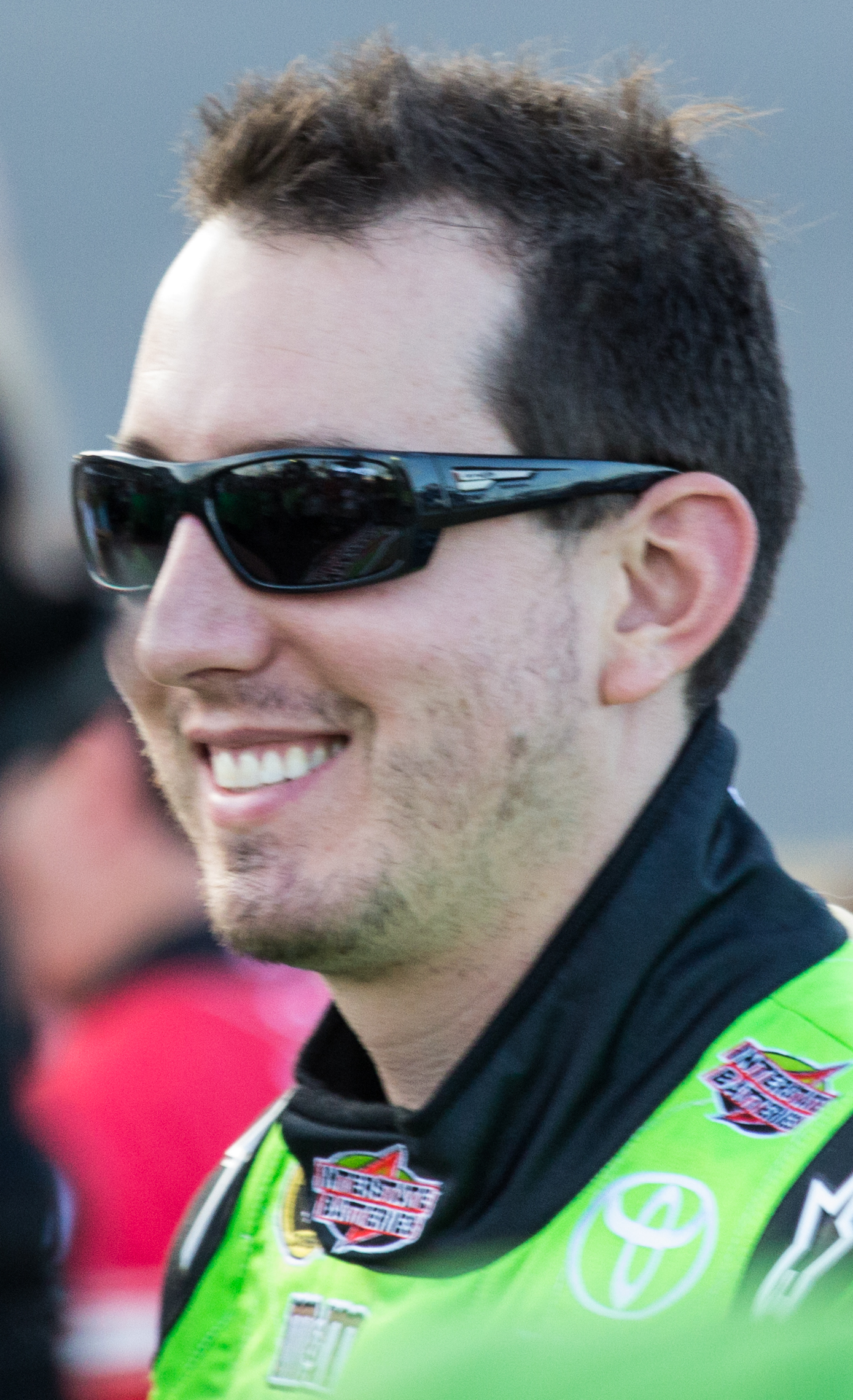
Kyle Busch won the pole position, his third of the season.

Two practice sessions were held on July 4, 2013, in preparation for the race. The first session lasted for 80 minutes, while second session was 85 minutes long. Prior to the first practice session, NASCAR officials discovered illegal roof flaps in 16 cars. Every Joe Gibbs Racing, Roush Fenway Racing, Michael Waltrip Racing and Penske Racing cars were involved, along with Jamie McMurray, Marcos Ambrose, Casey Mears, Aric Almirola and Trevor Bayne.

During the first practice session, A.J. Allmendinger, for the Phoenix Racing team, was quickest ahead of Bowyer in second and Edwards in third. Juan Pablo Montoya was scored fourth, and Earnhardt Jr. managed fifth. Paul Menard, Danica Patrick, Denny Hamlin, Ambrose, and Johnson rounded out the top ten quickest drivers in the session. In the final practice session for the race, David Reutimann was the quickest of the seventeen drivers who participated. David Ragan followed in second, ahead of Ambrose and Jeff Gordon in third and fourth. Michael Waltrip, who was thirty-sixth quickest in second practice, managed fifth.

During qualifying, Kyle Busch clinched his thirteenth career pole position with a lap time of 46.458 seconds and a speed of 193.723 mph (311.767 km/h). After his qualifying run, Kyle Busch said, "I've not had many opportunities for me to win poles at restrictor-plate races, so I've got to thank the team, all the guys at Joe Gibbs Racing that did such a good job building a slick race car. It's a team effort coming to these places and having great race cars. I'm really excited to be starting up front, especially with my teammate Matt Kenseth on the front row with us." He was joined on the front row of the grid by Kenseth. Bowyer qualified third, Kahne took fourth, and Truex Jr. started fifth. Menard, Waltrip, Johnson, Ricky Stenhouse Jr., and Biffle completed the first ten positions on the grid.

=== Race ===
Kyle Busch started on pole, but Matt Kenseth led the first lap. Busch would then re-take the lead and lead the next 30 laps. The first caution waved on lap 24 when Paul Menard blew an engine. Jimmie Johnson took the lead on the restart at lap 32, as Busch started to drift back in the outside line. Johnson led until lap 70 when the caution came out as Joey Logano hit the wall in the middle of a round of green-flag pit stops. Johnson had not yet pitted and would have to restart 17th behind the cars that had already made pit stops, giving the lead to Denny Hamlin.

Nonetheless, Johnson would draft back up to the front and push Jamie McMurray past Hamlin to take the lead on lap 94. The third caution waved on lap 101 as Martin Truex Jr. got sideways and collected Hamlin and Juan Pablo Montoya, also giving Busch some significant front damage. Truex would be the only one to retire following the crash. Johnson took the lead on the restart and held it all the way until the fourth caution waved on lap 126 for a crash involving David Stremme, Aric Almirola, Greg Biffle, and A. J. Allmendinger in the tri-oval. Both Stremme and Almirola would retire from the race. Following the lap 133 restart, Johnson held the lead and was joined at the front by teammate Kasey Kahne (who was subsequently passed by both Kevin Harvick and Tony Stewart).

On lap 148, the fifth caution of the race came out for a large crash in the tri-oval. It started when Denny Hamlin lost control near the entrance of pit road and turned up the track. He went head-on into the wall and was hit by A.J. Allmendinger and Dave Blaney, almost causing Hamlin to flip. Matt Kenseth, who swerved while trying to avoid Hamlin, cut down and collected Jeff Gordon and David Reutimann, totalling six cars in all. The red flag was displayed for nine minutes to allow for cleanup and the race restarted on lap 154, with Johnson and Kahne jumping ahead of Harvick and Stewart. As they began lap 156, Johnson moved up to block a fast-approaching Marcos Ambrose and nearly lost the lead. However, Johnson blocked Ambrose out of turn two, which caused Ambrose to swerve and knock Kahne into the inside wall, bringing out another caution. Ambrose would subsequently have to pit for repairs as Johnson held the lead.

The race restarted on lap 160 (going past the scheduled distance of 160 laps and eventually ending after 161 laps) for a green-white-checker attempt with Johnson and Stewart holding the lead over Harvick and Clint Bowyer. As the field worked through turn one, Carl Edwards was turned around by Scott Speed in turn one, collecting Marcos Ambrose, Bobby Labonte, Joe Nemechek, and Landon Cassill. No caution was thrown for this wreck, which happened behind the leaders, and the field continued racing. Approaching the tri-oval, as Johnson held off Stewart to win his fourth race of the season, Danica Patrick cut down the track and was turned by David Gilliland, collecting Ryan Newman, Kyle Busch, Ricky Stenhouse Jr., Casey Mears, Greg Biffle, Jeff Burton, Terry Labonte, and more. Harvick, Bowyer, and Michael Waltrip rounded out the top five.

Of note, by winning this race, Johnson became the first driver in 31 years (since Bobby Allison in 1982) to win the Daytona 500 and the Coke Zero 400 in the same year.

== Results ==
=== Qualifying ===
Grid	No.	Driver	Team	Manufacturer	Time	Speed
1	18	Kyle Busch	Joe Gibbs Racing	Toyota	46.458	193.723
2	20	Matt Kenseth	Joe Gibbs Racing	Toyota	46.560	193.299
3	15	Clint Bowyer	Michael Waltrip Racing	Toyota	46.594	193.158
4	5	Kasey Kahne	Hendrick Motorsports	Chevrolet	46.595	193.154
5	56	Martin Truex Jr.	Michael Waltrip Racing	Toyota	46.601	193.129
6	27	Paul Menard	Richard Childress Racing	Chevrolet	46.614	193.075
7	55	Michael Waltrip	Michael Waltrip Racing	Toyota	46.618	193.058
8	48	Jimmie Johnson	Hendrick Motorsports	Chevrolet	46.630	193.009
9	17	Ricky Stenhouse Jr.	Roush Fenway Racing	Ford	46.636	192.984
10	16	Greg Biffle	Roush Fenway Racing	Ford	46.645	192.947
11	10	Danica Patrick	Stewart–Haas Racing	Chevrolet	46.649	192.930
12	99	Carl Edwards	Roush Fenway Racing	Ford	46.656	192.901
13	14	Tony Stewart	Stewart–Haas Racing	Chevrolet	46.662	192.876
14	42	Juan Pablo Montoya	Earnhardt Ganassi Racing	Chevrolet	46.665	192.864
15	2	Brad Keselowski	Penske Racing	Ford	46.680	192.802
16	88	Dale Earnhardt Jr.	Hendrick Motorsports	Chevrolet	46.681	192.798
17	31	Jeff Burton	Richard Childress Racing	Chevrolet	46.699	192.724
18	22	Joey Logano	Penske Racing	Ford	46.701	192.715
19	13	Casey Mears	Germain Racing	Ford	46.701	192.715
20	21	Trevor Bayne	Wood Brothers Racing	Ford	46.733	192.583
21	39	Ryan Newman	Stewart–Haas Racing	Chevrolet	46.748	192.522
22	78	Kurt Busch	Furniture Row Racing	Chevrolet	46.756	192.489
23	24	Jeff Gordon	Hendrick Motorsports	Chevrolet	46.766	192.448
24	11	Denny Hamlin	Joe Gibbs Racing	Toyota	46.768	192.439
25	9	Marcos Ambrose	Richard Petty Motorsports	Ford	46.827	192.197
26	29	Kevin Harvick	Richard Childress Racing	Chevrolet	46.838	192.152
27	1	Jamie McMurray	Earnhardt Ganassi Racing	Chevrolet	46.905	191.877
28	38	David Gilliland	Front Row Motorsports	Ford	46.935	191.755
29	7	Dave Blaney	Tommy Baldwin Racing	Chevrolet	46.986	191.546
30	43	Aric Almirola	Richard Petty Motorsports	Ford	47.045	191.306
31	98	Michael McDowell	Phil Parsons Racing	Ford	47.171	190.795
32	36	J. J. Yeley	Tommy Baldwin Racing	Chevrolet	47.186	190.735
33	51	A. J. Allmendinger	Phoenix Racing	Chevrolet	47.188	190.726
34	47	Bobby Labonte	JTG Daugherty Racing	Toyota	47.275	190.375
35	30	David Stremme	Swan Racing	Toyota	47.318	190.202
36	95	Scott Speed	Leavine Family Racing	Ford	47.405	189.853
37	35	Josh Wise	Front Row Motorsports	Ford	47.412	189.825
38	34	David Ragan	Front Row Motorsports	Ford	47.419	189.797
39	32	Terry Labonte	FAS Lane Racing	Ford	47.460	189.633
40	93	Travis Kvapil	BK Racing	Toyota	47.620	188.996
41	83	David Reutimann	BK Racing	Toyota	47.687	188.731
42	87	Joe Nemechek	NEMCO-Jay Robinson Racing	Toyota	47.689	188.723
43	33	Landon Cassill	Circle Sport	Chevrolet	47.840	188.127

=== Race results ===
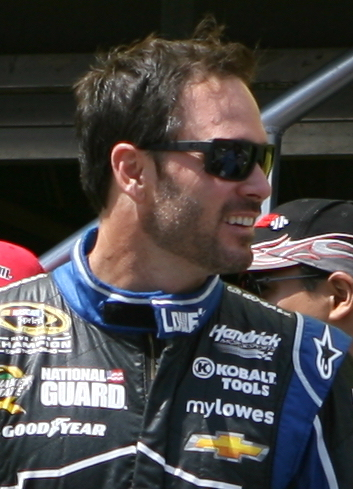
Jimmie Johnson became the first driver to win both races at Daytona since 1982.

Pos	No.	Driver	Team	Manufacturer	Laps	Led	Points^{1}
1	48	Jimmie Johnson	Hendrick Motorsports	Chevrolet	161	94	48
2	14	Tony Stewart	Stewart–Haas Racing	Chevrolet	161	0	42
3	29	Kevin Harvick	Richard Childress Racing	Chevrolet	161	0	41
4	15	Clint Bowyer	Michael Waltrip Racing	Toyota	161	0	40
5	55	Michael Waltrip	Michael Waltrip Racing	Toyota	161	0	39
6	78	Kurt Busch	Furniture Row Racing	Chevrolet	161	0	38
7	1	Jamie McMurray	Earnhardt Ganassi Racing	Chevrolet	161	10	38
8	88	Dale Earnhardt Jr.	Hendrick Motorsports	Chevrolet	161	0	36
9	13	Casey Mears	Germain Racing	Ford	161	0	35
10	39	Ryan Newman	Stewart–Haas Racing	Chevrolet	161	0	34
11	17	Ricky Stenhouse Jr.	Roush Fenway Racing	Ford	161	0	33
12	18	Kyle Busch	Joe Gibbs Racing	Toyota	161	29	33
13	36	J. J. Yeley	Tommy Baldwin Racing	Chevrolet	161	2	32
14	10	Danica Patrick	Stewart–Haas Racing	Chevrolet	161	0	30
15	38	David Gilliland	Front Row Motorsports	Ford	161	1	30
16	31	Jeff Burton	Richard Childress Racing	Chevrolet	161	1	29
17	16	Greg Biffle	Roush Fenway Racing	Ford	161	0	27
18	93	Travis Kvapil	BK Racing	Toyota	161	1	27
19	32	Terry Labonte	FAS Lane Racing	Ford	161	0	25
20	21	Trevor Bayne	Wood Brothers Racing	Ford	161	0	0^{[2]}
21	2	Brad Keselowski	Penske Racing	Ford	161	0	23
22	34	David Ragan	Front Row Motorsports	Ford	161	1	23
23	47	Bobby Labonte	JTG Daugherty Racing	Toyota	161	0	21
24	33	Landon Cassill	Circle Sport	Chevrolet	161	0	0^{[2]}
25	35	Josh Wise	Front Row Motorsports	Ford	161	1	0^{[2]}
26	9	Marcos Ambrose	Richard Petty Motorsports	Ford	161	0	18
27	87	Joe Nemechek	NEMCO-Jay Robinson Racing	Toyota	161	0	0^{[2]}
28	95	Scott Speed	Leavine Family Racing	Ford	161	0	16
29	99	Carl Edwards	Roush Fenway Racing	Ford	161	0	15
30	83	David Reutimann	BK Racing	Toyota	159	0	14
31	7	Dave Blaney	Tommy Baldwin Racing	Chevrolet	157	0	13
32	5	Kasey Kahne	Hendrick Motorsports	Chevrolet	155	0	12
33	20	Matt Kenseth	Joe Gibbs Racing	Toyota	154	1	12
34	24	Jeff Gordon	Hendrick Motorsports	Chevrolet	151	0	10
35	51	A. J. Allmendinger	Phoenix Racing	Chevrolet	149	0	9
36	11	Denny Hamlin	Joe Gibbs Racing	Toyota	149	20	9
37	30	David Stremme	Swan Racing	Toyota	127	0	7
38	43	Aric Almirola	Richard Petty Motorsports	Ford	127	0	6
39	42	Juan Pablo Montoya	Earnhardt Ganassi Racing	Chevrolet	126	0	5
40	22	Joey Logano	Penske Racing	Ford	105	0	4
41	56	Martin Truex Jr.	Michael Waltrip Racing	Toyota	97	0	3
42	98	Michael McDowell	Phil Parsons Racing	Ford	33	0	2
43	27	Paul Menard	Richard Childress Racing	Chevrolet	23	0	1

Notes
1. ^1 Points include 3 Chase for the Sprint Cup points for winning, 1 point for leading a lap, and 1 point for most laps led.
2. ^{a} ^{b} ^{c} ^{d} Ineligible for driver's championship points.

== Standings after the race ==
Drivers' Championship standings

	Pos	Driver	Points
	1	Jimmie Johnson	658
1	2	Clint Bowyer	609 (–49)
1	3	Carl Edwards	587 (–71)
	4	Kevin Harvick	585 (–73)
1	5	Dale Earnhardt Jr.	548 (–110)

Manufacturers' Championship standings

Pos	Manufacturer	Points
1	Chevrolet	127
2	Toyota	116 (–11)
3	Ford	91 (–36)

- Note: Only the top five positions are included for the driver standings.

Previous race: 2013 Quaker State 400	Sprint Cup Series; 2013 season	Next race: 2013 Camping World RV Sales 301
