= Ryan Howard (racing driver) =

American racing driver (born 1985)

- Born: May 31, 1985 (age 41); Tipp City, Ohio, U.S.

ARCA Menards Series career
- 42 races run over 4 years
- Best finish: 4th (2006)
- First race: 2004 GFS Marketplace 200 (Berlin)
- Last race: 2007 Daytona ARCA 200 (Daytona)
| Wins | Top tens | Poles |
|---|---|---|
| 0 | 7 | 0 |
- Statistics up to date as of July 9, 2023.

Ryan Howard (born May 31, 1985) is an American professional stock car racing driver who has previously competed in the ARCA Re/Max Series.

== Racing career ==
From 2001 to 2003, Howard competed in various racing series' like the Sprint Car Racing Association, the King of Indiana Sprint Series, the All Star Circuit of Champions, and the USAC Sprint Car National Championship.

In 2004, Howard would make his ARCA Re/Max Series debut at Berlin Raceway, driving the No. 56 Chevrolet for Mark Gibson Racing, where he would start 26th and finish 27th due to handling issues. He would make five more starts, getting a best finish of sixth at Salem Speedway. For the following year, he would make select starts for Mark Gibson Racing, including a one-off start with Bobby Gerhart Racing in the No. 5 Chevrolet at Lanier Raceway, where he would finish 25th. In his starts with Gibson, he would fail to qualify six times and get a best finish of 21st at the Illinois State Fairgrounds dirt track.

In 2006, it was announced that Howard would run full-time in the No. 59 Chevrolet for Mark Gibson Racing whilst also going for the rookie of the year honors. He would get six top-tens with a best finish of seventh at Toledo Speedway on his way to finish fourth in the final points standings. He would also finish third in the rookie standings behind Ryan Foster and Blake Bjorklund despite finishing ahead of them in the drivers standings. He would make one more ARCA start at Daytona International Speedway in 2007, driving the No. 32 Dodge for Country Joe Racing, where he would finish fourteenth despite starting 34th. He has not competed in the series since then.

Howard has recently competed in the Carolina Mini Stock Challenge and the United States Racing Association.

== Motorsports results ==
=== ARCA Re/Max Series ===
(key) (Bold – Pole position awarded by qualifying time. Italics – Pole position earned by points standings or practice time. * – Most laps led.)

ARCA Re/Max Series results
| Year | Team | No. | Make | 1 | 2 | 3 | 4 | 5 | 6 | 7 | 8 | 9 | 10 | 11 | 12 | 13 | 14 | 15 | 16 | 17 | 18 | 19 | 20 | 21 | 22 | 23 | ARMC | Pts | Ref |
|---|---|---|---|---|---|---|---|---|---|---|---|---|---|---|---|---|---|---|---|---|---|---|---|---|---|---|---|---|---|
| 2004 | Mark Gibson Racing | 56 | Chevy | DAY | NSH | SLM | KEN | TOL | CLT | KAN | POC | MCH | SBO | BLN; 27 | KEN | GTW | POC; 32 | LER; 20 | | ISF; 13 | TOL; DNQ | DSF | CHI | SLM; 6 | TAL | | 38th | 730 | |
| 2004 | Mark Gibson Racing | 2 | Chevy | | | | | | | | | | | | | | | | NSH; 37 | | | | | | | | 38th | 730 | |
| 2005 | Mark Gibson Racing | 56 | Chevy | DAY; DNQ | NSH | SLM; DNQ | | TOL; 35 | | MIL; 37 | POC; 35 | MCH; DNQ | KAN; 34 | KEN | BLN; DNQ | POC | GTW; 37 | LER; 33 | NSH; 37 | MCH; 41 | ISF; 21 | TOL | DSF; 36 | CHI; DNQ | SLM | TAL; DNQ | 35th | 1140 | |
| 2005 | Mark Gibson Racing | 33 | Chevy | | | | KEN; 39 | | | | | | | | | | | | | | | | | | | | 35th | 1140 | |
| 2005 | Bobby Gerhart Racing | 5 | Chevy | | | | | | LAN; 25 | | | | | | | | | | | | | | | | | | 35th | 1140 | |
| 2006 | Mark Gibson Racing | 59 | Chevy | DAY; 16 | NSH; 38 | SLM; 11 | WIN; 25 | KEN; 16 | TOL; 13 | POC; 8 | MCH; 25 | KAN; 12 | KEN; 9 | BLN; 23 | POC; 12 | GTW; 25 | NSH; 12 | MCH; 8 | ISF; 16 | MIL; 11 | TOL; 7 | DSF; 10 | CHI; 15 | SLM; 10 | TAL; 41 | IOW; 13 | 4th | 4670 | |
| 2007 | Country Joe Racing | 32 | Dodge | DAY; 14 | USA | NSH | SLM | KAN | WIN | KEN | TOL | IOW | POC | MCH | BLN | KEN | POC | NSH | ISF | MIL | GTW | DSF | CHI | SLM | TAL | TOL | 127th | 160 | |
