= Billy Leslie =

American racing driver

- Born: October 14, 1987 (age 39); Algonac, Michigan, U.S.

ARCA Menards Series career
- 36 races run over 6 years
- Best finish: 24th (2007)
- First race: 2005 Kentuckiana Ford Dealers ARCA 200 by Federated Auto Parts (Salem)
- Last race: 2009 Wolverine Power Systems 200 presented by Generac (Berlin)
- First win: 2007 Winchester ARCA 200 (Winchester)
Wins	Top tens	Poles
1	6	0
- Statistics up to date as of November 7, 2022.

Billy Leslie (born October 14, 1987) is an American former professional racing driver. He is the son of former NASCAR Busch Series driver Tracy Leslie. He has previously competed in the ARCA Racing Series with one win in 2007 at Winchester Speedway and six top-10's.

== Racing career ==
Leslie first made his ARCA Re/Max Series debut in 2005 at the age of seventeen driving for Lee Leslie in the No. 44 Ford at Salem Speedway, where he would finish 25th due to a crash. He would make four more starts during the year with a best finish of 13th at Lake Erie Speedway. He would return in 2006, mostly driving the No. 2 for Hixson Motorsports, Eddie Sharp Racing, and DGM Racing, where he would score two top-tens, including a third place finish at Winchester Speedway.

Leslie would remain in the series the following year in 2007, now driving the No. 18 Ford for his father Tracy. He would start his season at Salem, where he would finish 21st due to a crash. At his next race at Winchester, he would start eighth, and would lead the final 60 laps on route to his first and only ARCA Re/Max Series win ahead of Brian Keselowski. He would make nine more starts and would score two more top-tens that year. He would remain with in the No. 18 in 2008, only earning one top-ten at Berlin Raceway, where he would finish sixth.

In 2009, Leslie would run in three races, crashing at Rockingham Speedway and suffering a suspension issue at Mansfield Motorsports Park. In his final race of the year at Berlin, Leslie was involved in a frightening crash of the sixth lap, where he would run off course on the berm outside the second turn and would attempt to get back onto the track, which caused him to hit the tire barrier at turn three and go off the track, where he would flip a number of times before the car came to a rest in the forest outside the track. He would escape with minor injuries. After failing to start at Palm Beach International Raceway in the No. 17 Ford for Andy Belmont, he would not compete in ARCA competition again.

Afterwards, he would run in the CRA Super Series, first racing in the Southern division before racing in the main series from 2011 to 2012.

== Motorsports results ==
=== ARCA Racing Series ===
(key) (Bold – Pole position awarded by qualifying time. Italics – Pole position earned by points standings or practice time. * – Most laps led.)

ARCA Racing Series results
Year	Team	No.	Make	1	2	3	4	5	6	7	8	9	10	11	12	13	14	15	16	17	18	19	20	21	22	23	ARSC	Pts	Ref
2005	Lee Leslie Racing	44	Ford	DAY	NSH	SLM; 25	KEN	TOL; DNQ	LAN	MIL; 22	POC	MCH	KAN	KEN													45th	760	
2005	Lee Leslie Racing	3	Ford												BLN; 14	POC	GTW	LER; 13	NSH	MCH	ISF; DNQ	TOL; 14	DSF	CHI	SLM; DNQ	TAL	45th	760	
2006	Lee Leslie Racing	44	Ford	DAY; DNQ	NSH																						50th	760	
2006	Hixson Motorsports	2	Ford			SLM; 6	WIN; 3	KEN						BLN; 33	POC	GTW	NSH	MCH	ISF	MIL							50th	760	
2006	Eddie Sharp Racing	2	Ford						TOL; 35	POC	MCH	KAN	KEN								TOL; 28	DSF	CHI				50th	760	
2006	DGM Racing	2	Ford																					SLM; 24	TAL	IOW	50th	760	
2007	Leslie Racing	18	Ford	DAY	USA	NSH	SLM; 21	KAN	WIN; 1	KEN	TOL; 8	IOW; 28	POC	MCH; 17	BLN; 29	KEN	POC	NSH	ISF	MIL; 6	GTW; 14	DSF	CHI	SLM; 30	TAL; 37	TOL; 25	24th	1685	
2008	Leslie Racing	18	Ford	DAY	SLM; 30	IOW; 18	KAN	CAR; 38	KEN; 15	TOL; 31	POC	MCH; 31	CAY; 26	KEN; 36	BLN; 6	POC	NSH; 14	ISF	DSF	CHI; 14	SLM	NJE	TAL	TOL			29th	1210	
2009	Leslie Racing	18	Ford	DAY	SLM	CAR; 39	TAL	KEN	TOL	POC	MCH	MFD; 23	IOW	KEN	BLN; 32	POC	ISF	CHI	TOL	DSF	NJE	SLM	KAN	CAR			100th	220	
2010	Andy Belmont Racing	17	Ford	DAY	PBE; 34	SLM	TEX	TAL	TOL	POC	MCH	IOW	MFD	POC	BLN	NJE	ISF	CHI	DSF	TOL	SLM	KAN	CAR				143rd	0	
