= Cunningham Motorsports =

Defunct stock car racing team

- Owner(s): Briggs Cunningham III; Kerry Scherer
- Base: Mooresville, North Carolina
- Series: ARCA Racing Series
- Manufacturer: Dodge, Ford
- Opened: 1997
- Closed: 2017

Career
- Debut: ARCA Racing Series: 1997 ARCA 200 (Daytona)
- Latest race: ARCA Racing Series: 2017 Kansas ARCA 150 (Kansas)
- Drivers' Championships: Total: 1 ARCA Racing Series: 1
- Race victories: Total: 40; ARCA Racing Series: 40

Cunningham Motorsports (operating at various points in its history as CSG Motorsports and CHS Motorsports) was an American professional stock car racing team that competed primarily in the ARCA Racing Series, but also in the NASCAR Camping World Truck Series and Busch Series. At various points, the team had driver development links to Dodge, Ganassi Racing Team Penske and Roush Fenway Racing, and won the 2016 ARCA Racing Series championship with Joe Gibbs Racing driver Chase Briscoe. After 2017, the team was sold to crew chief Chad Bryant, which fielded the Nos. 22 and 77 in ARCA competition until it eventually shut down.

== History ==
Cunningham formed in 1997 as CSG Motorsports as a three-way partnership between Briggs Cunningham III, Kerry Scherer and Mark Gibson. After driving three years for the team, Gibson split from Cunningham and Scherer in early 2000. The team primarily ran in the ARCA Racing Series but dabbled in Busch Series competition. In 2007, Cunningham and Scherer brought on Eddie Hartman to form CHS Motorsports, which competed in the Camping World Truck Series. CHS lasted three years before Hartman broke off and formed a partnership with Eddie Sharp. The team then focused exclusively on ARCA competition and signed a developmental contract with Team Penske in 2008. The team then won several Rookie of the Year awards in the late 2000s and early 2010s before winning the ARCA championship in 2016 with Chase Briscoe. Due to the ailing health of owner Cunningham, the team closed at the end of the 2017 ARCA Racing Series season. On January 9, 2018, the sale of the team was announced. Longtime crew chief Chad Bryant bought the assets of the team to form Chad Bryant Racing. Bryant kept the same numbers and personnel from the old Cunningham team and signed Bo LeMastus and Joe Graf Jr. as his first drivers.

== Busch Series ==
=== Car No. 06 history ===
Team driver Justin Labonte ran a race at Michigan in 2003, finishing a lap down.

== Craftsman Truck Series ==
=== Truck No. 41 history ===
The Craftsman Truck Series branch of the organization was named CHS Motorsports with additional co-owner Eddie Hartman. The team aligned itself with Ganassi Racing in late 2007 to give Dario Franchitti his first NASCAR start, which he did not finish. Under the direction of Hartman the team ran in a part-time capacity for the next two years, starting with Tayler Malsam and Ryan Mathews in 2008. The team start and parked in 2009 with various drivers. In 2010, Hartman and Cunningham parted ways and Hartman formed a partnership with Eddie Sharp and ran two full races with Steve Park behind the wheel of the Toyota Tundra No. 41 (the team ran with Dodge Ram until 2009).

The team was going to attempt a partial schedule in the 2017 NASCAR Camping World Truck Series season but the effort fell through.

== ARCA Racing Series ==
=== Car No. 4 history ===
Marc Brenner drove a partial schedule in the car in 2000 with backing from Outdoor Channel. He mostly ran in the mid-teens, cracking the top ten at Michigan and Kentucky. With Brenner driving the superspeedways, Roger Blackstock ran the short tracks, making the top ten at Flat Rock and Winchester.

Justin Labonte signed a driver development contract to pilot the No. 4 car at select superspeedways in 2001. Labonte attempted five races in 2001, finding success mostly at Nashville, leading fifty-two laps before problems mired him to finish in the mid-teens. He scaled back his schedule with the team in 2002, finishing only the season-opening race.

Besides Labonte, the early years of the team were tumultuous times, with a wide range of drivers who often start and parked. The team still ran a bit under half of the schedule as a full-distance team in 2001, with drivers such as Blackstock, Ronnie Hornaday, Kevin Belmont (brother of longtime ARCA racer Andy Belmont), and others. The team's lone top ten finish of the year came with Austin Cameron, an eighth at Kansas. The team delved farther into start and parking in 2002, running only three full races: one with Labonte, one with Jeff Caudell and one with rising sixteen year old Justin Allgaier in an association with his family team.

The next three years saw the team run a limited schedule of races as a start and park team as NASCAR team Morgan–McClure Motorsports was using the number four for among other drivers Eric McClure.

The No. 4 entry returned full-time in 2005 in association with Hantz Group Racing and Mike Guerity Racing. Michael Guerity was the team's primary driver, recording top-tens at both restrictor plate tracks, both Pocono races and was the runner-up finish of the Michigan race. The team rotated Dodge drivers on most of the short tracks; one of those was Ronnie Hornaday, making his return to racing after two years working as a crew member with Ultra Motorsports in the NASCAR Camping World Truck Series. He ran two races for the team. He led 14 laps in one and turned in a best finish of eighth at Lanier Speedway in the other. Steve Wallace ran two races for the team and scored as many top tens while running a partial Truck schedule. Other drivers rotated in without much success, the exception being Bob Strait who led a lap and finished second at a dirt track race.

After a successful 2005 season Cunningham aligned themselves with Evernham Motorsports and Ganassi Racing, both as part of a Dodge development program. The partnership included drivers Scott Lagasse Jr., Chase Miller and A. J. Foyt IV. Foyt never made a start for the team, but Lagasse ran ten races alongside a NASCAR Camping World Truck Series schedule. He led almost 50 laps at Kansas before running out of fuel and breaking the transmission trying to restart the car. He started on the outside pole at Kentucky and Chicagoland and recorded top ten finishes in each of those races. Miller ran a combination of short-tracks and superspeedways, scoring a pole at Gateway and winning at Pocono, becoming the youngest ever winner in the ARCA series. Brake issues sidelined him in the Gateway race but he still finished in the top ten in two of his other four races, including another Pocono one where a dropped cylinder in the later stages eliminated Miller. Bob Strait returned to the team to run top-five on both dirt tracks on the schedule. As part of its deal with Ganassi, the team welcomed Juan Pablo Montoya into stock car racing with a test and then two starts, one at Talladega and one at Iowa. Montoya logged a top-five at Talladega while playing conservative. Kevin Swindell and Ryan Mathews also made starts.

In 2007, the team again rotated through a number of drivers while being a Dodge factory team. Tim Andrews won a pole at Pocono and also posted a top-ten at Nashville with his father serving as crew chief. Rob Bunker struggled to find speed and keep the car clean in his races. Bryan Clauson ran a race as part of a part-time ARCA schedule with Ganassi Racing. Team partner Mark Gibson ran both of the dirt tracks in the No. 4. Mathews also returned, albeit for one race instead of ten. Ray Mooi rounded out the stable of drivers, piloting the car for three races.

Tayler Malsam ran the No. 4 entry full-time in 2008 after piloting the No. 56 part-time the previous year as part of a Dodge driver development program. During his full-time season, Malsam recorded three top five finishes.

Ken Weaver, a businessman and convicted felon, joined the team in 2009 to try and win the championship. However, Weaver lost interest in racing halfway through the season, leaving the team before the race at Pocono. He had finished fifth in the season's first race but had not made the top ten since then. Chase Miller ran the next two races in the 4, turning in a third at Michigan. Hal Martin ran three nonconsecutive races for the team, running in the top ten at Kansas and Chicagoland. After running with Venturini Motorsports earlier in the season, Dakoda Armstrong signed on to drive Cunningham cars as part of a Penske Racing development deal. He finished in the top ten in two of his five races. Jonathan Eilen ran the Berlin race for the team, running as high as third before a late spin relegated him to 23rd. Mark Gibson returned to run the two dirt races. Patrick Long, in his only ARCA start of all-time, won the race at New Jersey Motorsports Park from the pole.

=== Car No. 22 history ===
The 22 started as a part-time entry in 2009, with Drew Herring and Dakoda Armstrong each driving a race. Armstrong took over the entry full-time the following year with the No. 4 entry folding. In 20 races, the Penske Racing development driver scored a win at Talladega while still in high school. He was pushed by Patrick Sheltra to the win. Armstrong was also the winner of the race at Salem and scored ten other top tens. He also ran well and led laps at other short tracks. Cunningham's first run at a driver's championship in three years resulted in a seventh-place finish.

The 22, along with the 77, became part-time in 2011. Armstrong continued with the team as the primary driver, running six races and winning the race at Winchester. He also ran well and led laps at other short tracks. Ryan Lynch and Chrissy Wallace also made starts in the 22 car.

Alex Bowman ran the 22 car for all 19 events in 2012, winning the races at Salem, Winchester, Iowa and Kansas. He also won three poles in the first six races. He won the Rookie of the Year award on a team that was in danger of shutting down midway through the season.

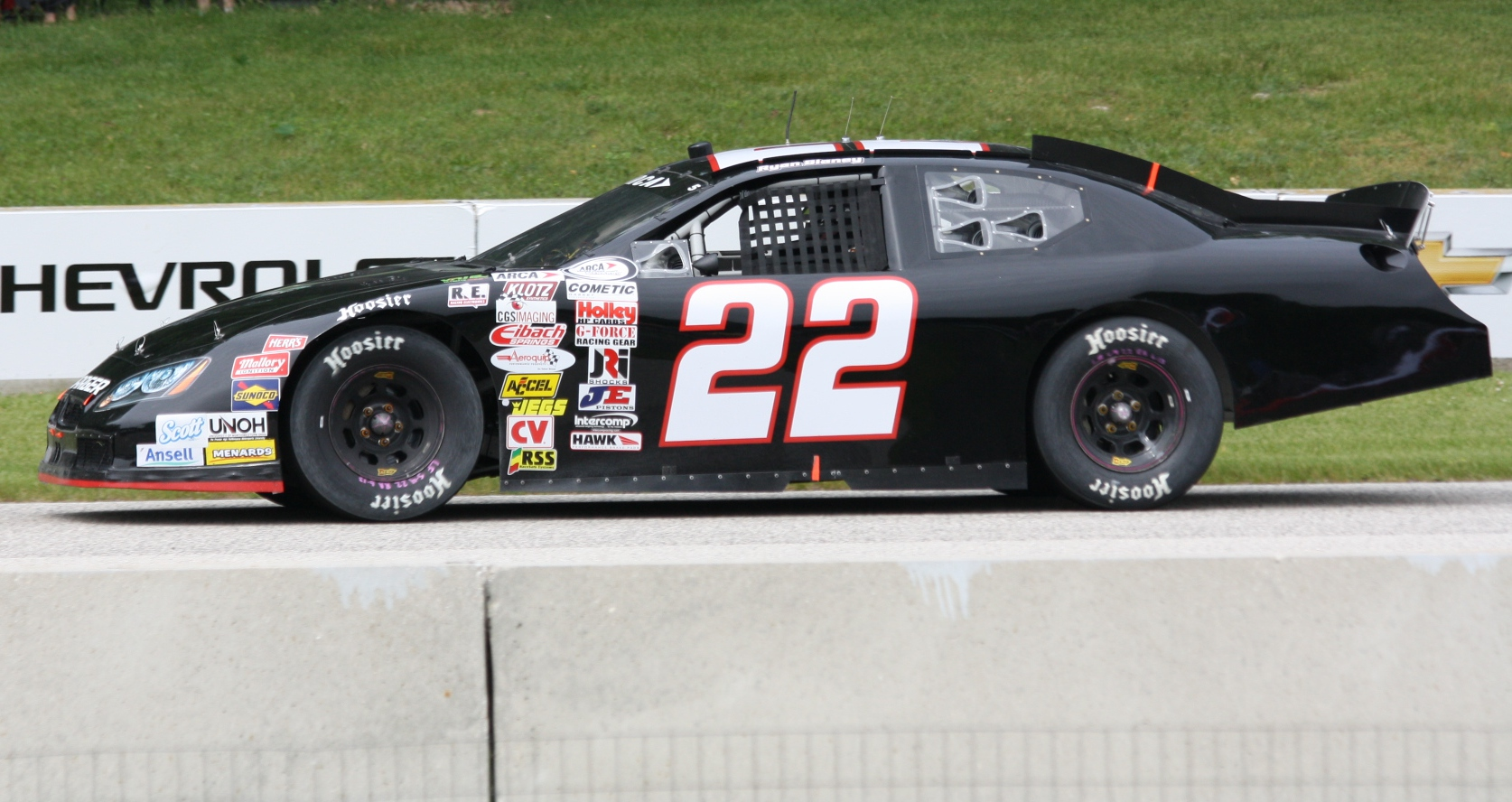
Ryan Blaney driving the #22 car in 2013

Local Minnesota short track racing driver Jonathan Eilen drove for the 22 team at Elko Speedway in 2013. Eilen finished third but did not return to the team or series after that race. Eilen was one of a slew of drivers to run the 22 car that year; Michel Disdier ran his first ARCA race in four years with the team at Daytona, and led the final practice session. Anderson Bowen signed as a Penske Racing development driver along with some K&N Pro Series West races at the age of 15. Bowen fell victim to a crash and mechanical failure in two of his three starts. After running a partial schedule with Kimmel Racing the year before, Korbin Forrister tested with Cunningham at Talladega and ran the race for the team, finishing just outside of the top ten. Will Kimmel ran both of the Pocono races and Kentucky when he was not driving for his family team. The short tracks were run by Austin Wayne Self, who also ran a K&N Pro schedule that year. Ryan Blaney, another Penske development driver, ran three races while running a full Camping World Truck Series schedule. He captured two poles and was the fastest car at Michigan but finished third after running out of fuel. Tyler Reddick ran a dirt race not as a development driver but as a local driver. After starting from the back, Reddick finished two laps down. Scott Lagasse Jr. and Justin South also made starts.

Trevor Bayne won a Pocono Raceway race in 2015 in his first race at the track after taking the lead from Mason Mitchell on the final restart. That was when primary driver Kyle Weatherman was not in the car as a part of a driver development program with Roush Fenway Racing. Weatherman finished fifth in his debut with the team and won the race at New Jersey Motorsports Park. He also claimed three consecutive poles in summer, the first one being at Iowa Speedway. Weatherman only finished outside of the top ten twice in fifteen races that season. Blake Jones won the race at Talladega Superspeedway as well that year and also ran other races in the 22. The combined success of the drivers led the 22 to a second-place finish in owners' points.

In 2016, Myatt Snider won his ARCA Racing Series debut at Toledo Speedway driving the 22. He also ran in eight more ARCA races in 2016, winning the pole at Michigan but crashed out of that race and two others. Parker Kligerman also recorded a win in the 22 that year, leading both practices and leading all but twelve laps en route to the victory at New Jersey Motorsports Park to bag Cunningham's 30th ARCA victory. Grant Enfinger drove the car for the DuQuoin State Fairgrounds Racetrack after winning the race the previous two years. Enfinger won the pole but faltered in the race, retiring early due to overheating. Other drivers who drove the 22 in 2016 included Ken Schrader, Frank Kimmel and his nephew Will, Brady Boswell, Kevin Thomas Jr., Clayton Weatherman and Blake Jones. Although the team rotated through a slew of drivers, it still managed a seventh-place finish in owner points that year.

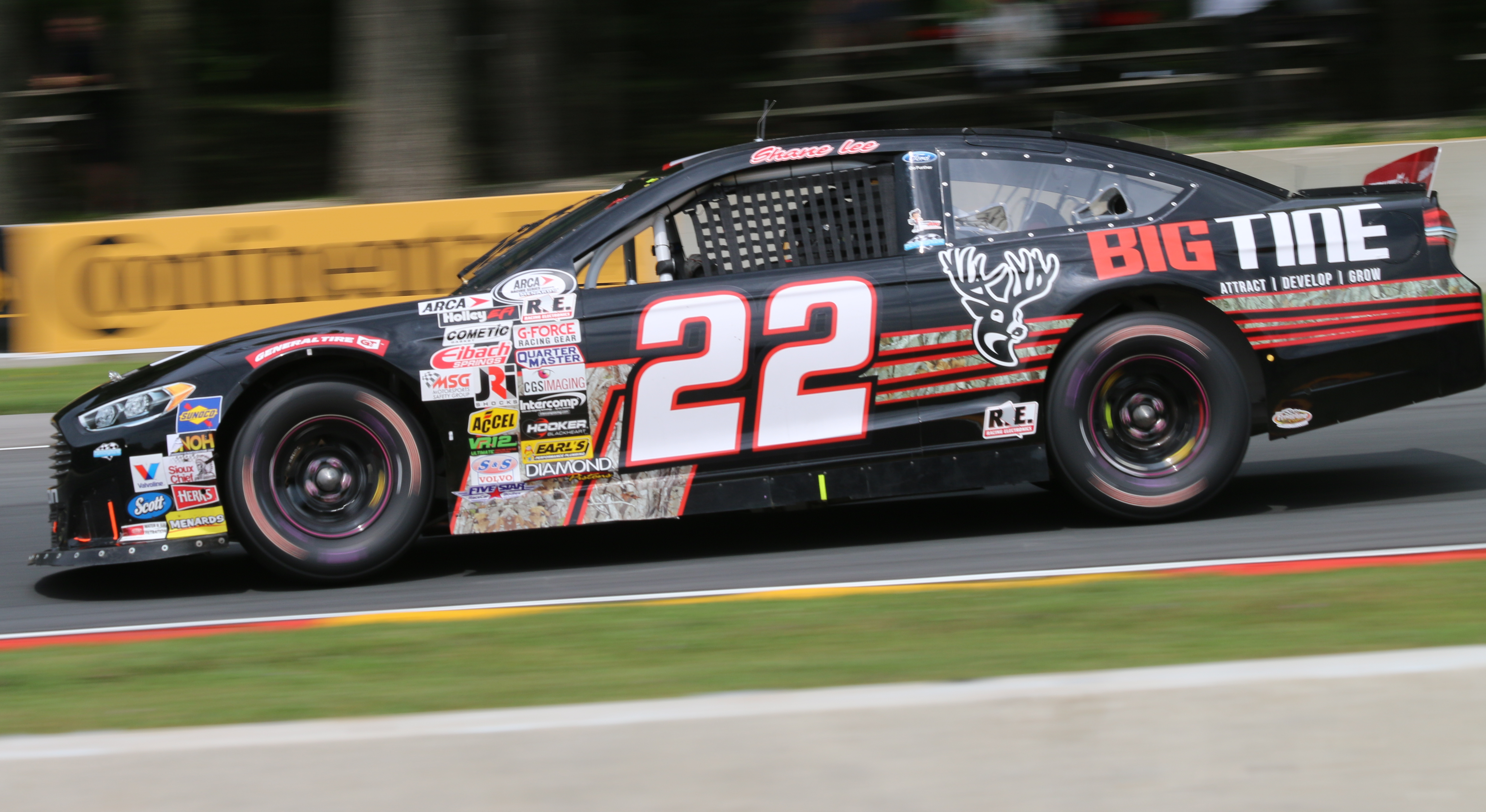
Shane Lee at Road America in 2017.

On January 5, 2017, it was announced that Shane Lee would drive the entire season in the 22 after driving a partial schedule in 2016 for Win-Tron Racing. Lee scored a pole and fourteen top fives on his way to a third-place points finish, right behind teammate Dalton Sargeant.

=== Car No. 29 history ===
Brandon Thompson drove the car for one race in 2008.

=== Car No. 45 history ===
Nur Ali joined the team for the Daytona race in 2009. The Pakistani was eliminated in a wreck before the halfway point of the race.

=== Car No. 59 history ===
The team's original entry, the No. 59 debuted in 1997 with co-owner Mark Gibson as driver. Gibson ran in the top ten for all but eight races, five of which were DNFs. He scored the team's first win at Gateway in the sixteenth race of the first season, beating out Tim Steele over the last fifteen laps before the victory. He returned to the car in the next season, winning the race at Texas and leading over 100 laps in the process. In 1999, he failed to reach victory lane for the first time with the team and finished only three times in the top five. After the 1999 season, Gibson split from Cunningham to make Mark Gibson Racing.

Justin South ran the No. 59 entry full-time in 2007, recording a best finish of third at Toledo. He also recorded eight other top ten finishes during the season. South left the team after 2007, citing a lack of both funding and chemistry.

=== Car No. 72 history ===
The 72 car ran as a part-time entry in 2014, debuting with Austin Wayne Self at Daytona, where the car failed to qualify. Self then transitioned to the 22 entry, and Tom Hessert III ran at Mobile International Speedway, Madison and Winchester when other drivers were in his normal 77 car. After making two starts in the first half of the season, the 72 made five starts in the second ten races, with Shannon McIntosh, Anderson Bowen, and Brandon Gdovic, who brought home a top-ten finish in the season finale.

=== Car No. 77 history ===
In an alliance with Team Penske, Cunningham fielded the 77 entry for Parker Kligerman in 2009, who ran two races in the 77 the year before. In 2009, Kligerman won nine of the 21 races on the schedule, including four in a row during summer. However, he lost the championship by a mere five points to Justin Lofton. The season for Kligerman only came together after the race at Salem Speedway; before that event the 77 team planned to run only a partial schedule of eight events.

Tom Hessert III drove the 77 in 2010, winning a race and finishing third in the point standings. After the season, Hessert departed for Ken Schrader Racing, where he would spend the next two seasons before returning to Cunningham for 2013.

The 77 car ran in the beginning of the season part-time with Joey Licata starting off the season with a top-ten finish at Daytona. He retired early at Talladega in the only other ARCA start of his career. After a couple of start and park races, Frankie Kimmel joined the team for the New Jersey race and also ran at Salem for the team, scoring another top-ten finish. The 77 entry folded as Cunningham focused on a full-time 22 entry with Alex Bowman in 2012.

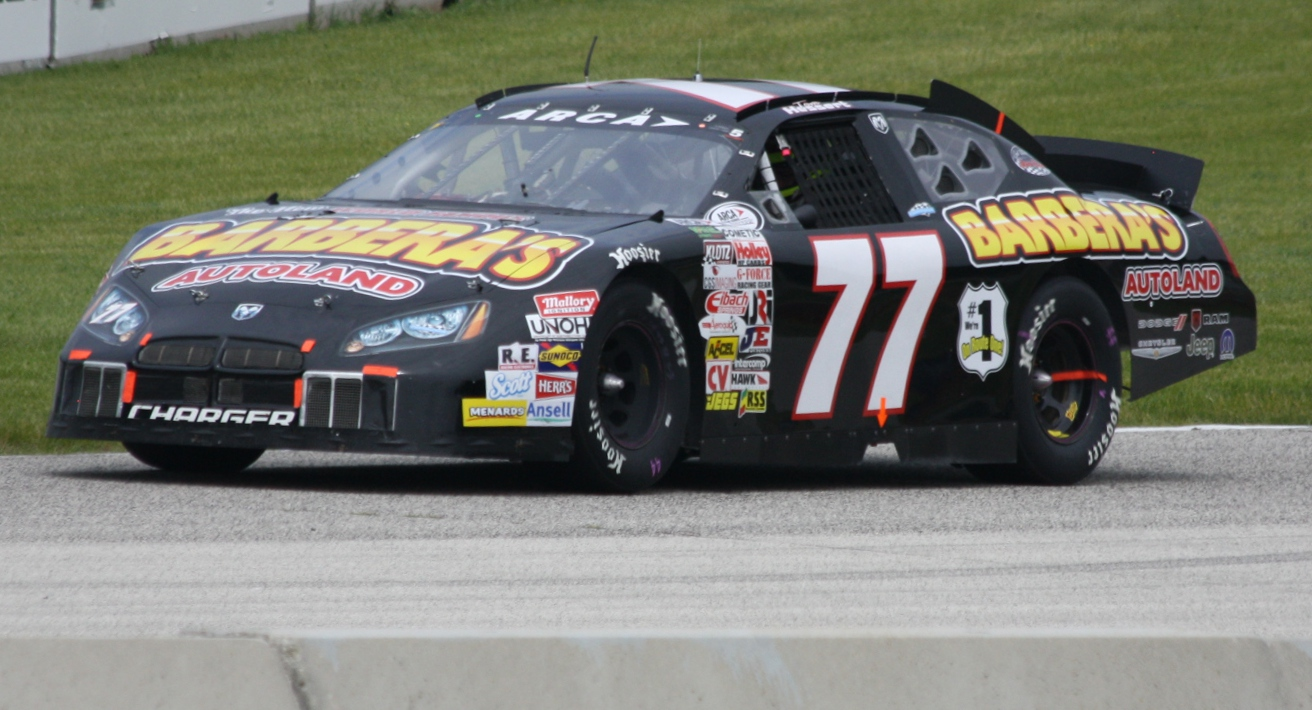
Tom Hessert III driving the #77 car in 2013

After driving for Cunningham in 2010, Tom Hessert III returned to the team for the 2013 ARCA Racing Series season. The New Jersey driver scored one win in 2013, at Salem Speedway. Hessert was fined $5,000 after the Allen Crowe 100 for turning fellow driver Spencer Gallagher after the conclusion of the race. He won the 2014 race at Talladega Superspeedway getting a push from Austin Wayne Self around Justin Boston and Bobby Gerhart. Hessert also won at Salem later in the season and recorded a slew of top-five and top-ten finishes in 2014. He drove the 77 to a third-place finish in the 2014 ARCA Racing Series point standings.

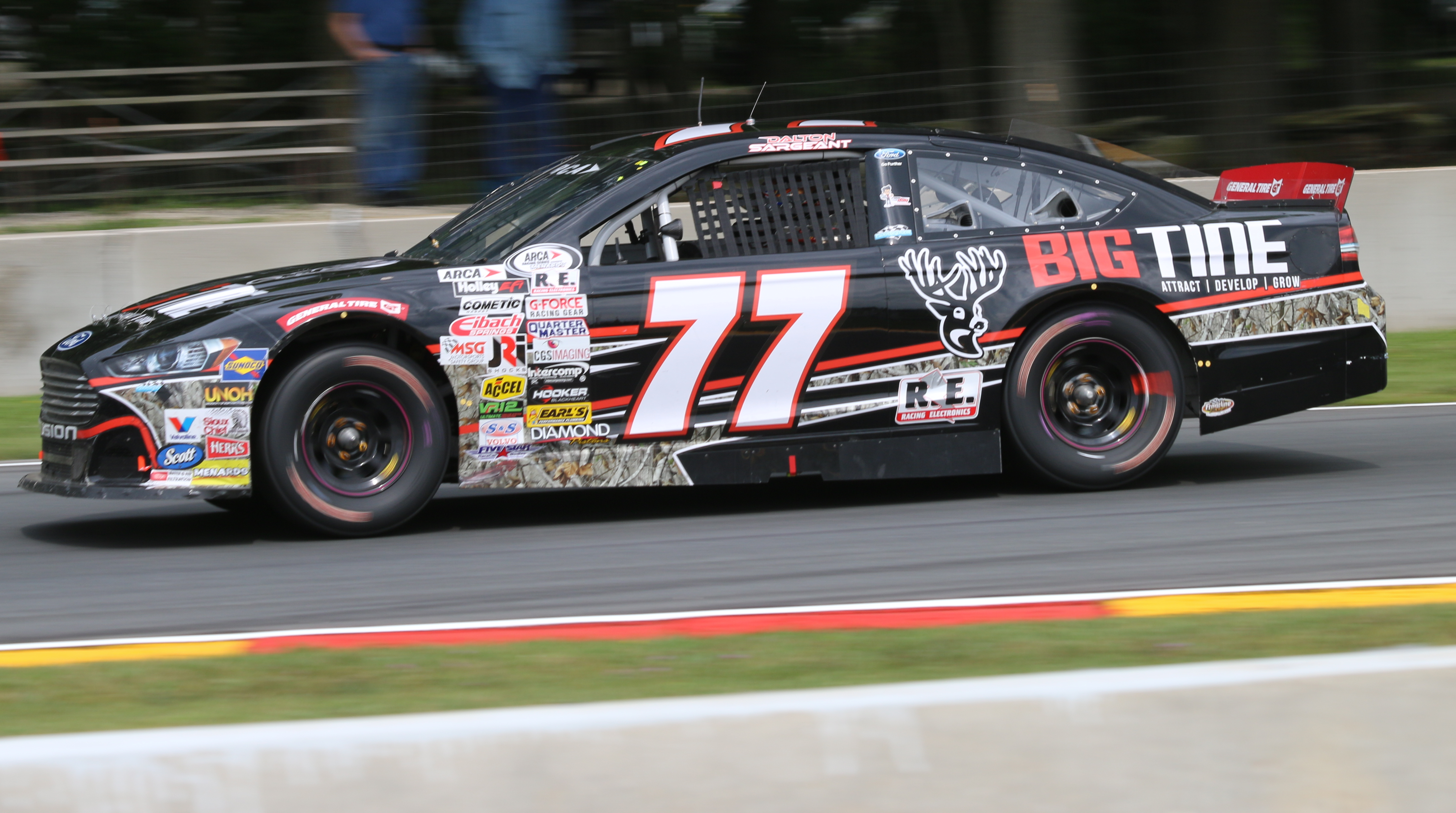
Dalton Sargeant at Road America in 2017.

Chase Briscoe won the ARCA Racing Series championship driving this entry in 2016. The 2016 season was Briscoe's first stock car racing season in his career. He had six wins during his championship season, including four in a row during summer. Dalton Sargeant was drove the car in 2017 after winning the ARCA Rookie of the Year award in 2016.

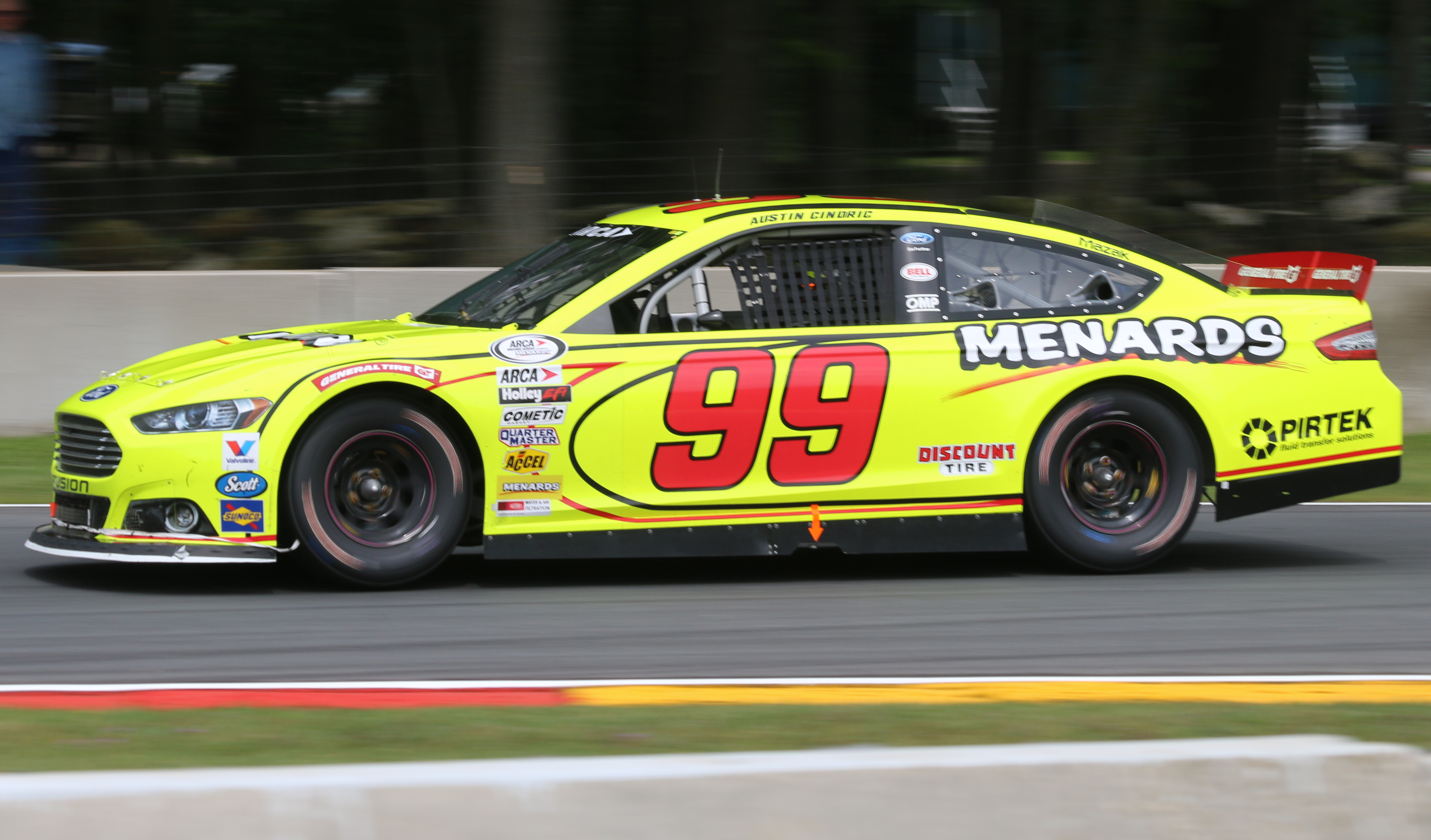
Austin Cindric at Road America in 2017.

=== Car No. 99 history ===
Austin Cindric ran the car on a limited schedule starting in 2015. He won at Kentucky in 2016. Ty Majeski, after testing a 77M car at Daytona International Speedway before the season, drove for five 2017 events. Cindric grabbed the pole at Road America and ran another partial schedule in 2017.

== Partnerships ==
Cunningham and Scherer signed on with Dodge to be a driver development program for the manufacturer in the ARCA Racing Series from 2001 to 2007. The team then announced a partnership with Team Penske (then Penske Racing) in June 2008, which would be effective for competition in the ARCA Racing Series (then ARCA ReMax Series), USAC Midgets, and the NASCAR Camping World Truck Series (then Craftsman Truck Series). Seven years later, Cunningham announced an ARCA-specific driver development program with Roush Fenway Racing to put Kyle Weatherman in a car. The team maintained both relationships until its closure, with Penske's Austin Cindric and RFR's Ty Majeski splitting the 99 entry in 2017.
