= Billy Tanner =

American racing driver

- Born: November 15, 1981 (age 44); Newtown, Pennsylvania, U.S.

ARCA Menards Series career
- 13 races run over 1 year
- Best finish: 29th (2007)
- First race: 2007 Daytona ARCA 200 (Salem)
- Last race: 2007 ARCA REMAX 250 (DuQuoin)
Wins	Top tens	Poles
0	0	0
- Statistics up to date as of May 13, 2024.

Billy Tanner IV (born November 15, 1981) is an American former professional stock car racing driver who has previously competed in the ARCA Re/Max Series.

== Racing career ==
Tanner, a fourth generation driver whose father raced at various tracks in Pennsylvania, began his professional racing start at the age of nine, where he competed in the Super DIRTcar Big-Block Modified Series at Nazareth Speedway, where he started 28th and finished in 22nd. Afterwards, he competed in various events in the Northeast, primarily driving quarter midgets, dirt sportsmen and 358 Dirt modifieds. In 2006, he competed in the Race of Champions North Series, where he finished sixth in points, and the Southern division, where he finished seventh in points.

In 2007, Tanner participated in the pre-season for the ARCA Re/Max Series at Daytona International Speedway, driving the No. 75 Ford, where he placed in the top-25 in the timesheet across the three days of testing. He later made his debut for the team several days later, where he qualified in 26th and finished one lap down in 21st. Afterwards, he joined Stott Classic Racing for his next race at Kentucky Speedway, driving the No. 07 Chevrolet, where he finished two laps down in seventeenth place. He then ran the next three races at Toledo Speedway, Iowa Speedway, and Pocono Raceway, where he finished nineteenth, 24th, and 27th respectively. Tanner would not return until the series' return to Kentucky, where he started 29th and finished in 37th due to a crash early in the race. In his next race at Pocono, Tanner benefited from a number of accidents that marred the event to finish fourteenth after starting in 26th. He then failed to reach the top-twenty in the next three races at Nashville Superspeedway, the Illinois State Fairgrounds dirt track, and the Milwaukee Mile, where he was just outside the top-ten before suffering an engine failure midway through the latter race, finishing 21st, 26th, and 29th respectively. Afterwards, he came back to finish in sixteenth position at Gateway International Raceway before running his penultimate race of the year at Chicagoland Speedway, where he finished in nineteenth after starting in 21st. In his last start of the year at Talladega Superspeedway, Tanner had been in the top-fifteen for the majority of the race before Michael McDowell lost a tire with less than twenty laps to go, causing a multi-car accident, which involved Tanner and put him out of the race, placing him 36th in the final results. After the crash, Tanner made comments criticizing McDowell during an interview on the SPEED Channel, which led to Tanner and Stott Classic Racing to issue a formal apology. Although he had hoped to compete the full ARCA schedule in 2008, this would ultimately not come to fruition, and he has not raced in the series since then.

== Motorsports results ==
=== ARCA Re/Max Series ===
(key) (Bold – Pole position awarded by qualifying time. Italics – Pole position earned by points standings or practice time. * – Most laps led. ** – All laps led.)

ARCA Re/Max Series results
Year	Team	No.	Make	1	2	3	4	5	6	7	8	9	10	11	12	13	14	15	16	17	18	19	20	21	22	23	ARMC	Pts	Ref
2007	Bob Schacht Motorsports	75	Ford	DAY; 21	USA	NSH	SLM	KAN	WIN																		29th	1460	
2007	Stott Classic Racing	07	Chevy							KEN; 17		IOW; 24	POC; 27	MCH	BLN	KEN; 37	POC; 14	NSH; 21		MIL; 29	GTW; 16	DSF	CHI; 19	SLM	TAL; 36	TOL	29th	1460	
2007	Stott Classic Racing	07	Pontiac								TOL; 19								ISF; 26								29th	1460	
