= Josh Allison (racing driver) =

American racing driver

- Born: April 17, 1988 (age 38); Martinsville, Indiana, U.S.

ARCA Menards Series career
- 31 races run over 4 years
- Best finish: 20th (2004)
- First race: 2004 Kentuckiana Ford Dealers 200 (Salem)
- Last race: 2007 Southern Illinois 100 (DuQuoin)
Wins	Top tens	Poles
0	5	0
- Statistics up to date as of May 3, 2024.

Josh Allison (born April 17, 1988) is an American former professional stock car racing driver who has previously competed in the ARCA Re/Max Series.

== Racing career ==
In 2001, Allison participated in the NAMARS Kenyon MidgetCar Series at the Indianapolis Speedrome for nine races, getting four top-tens with a best finish of sixth in his final start of the year. He then ran two more races in the series in 2002, finishing in the top-ten in both starts.

In 2004, Allison made his debut in the ARCA Re/Max Series at Salem Speedway, driving the No. 64 owned by his father Dave, where he started 26th with a provisional and finished fourteenth after being involved in a crash late in the race. he then ran the remaining short-track and dirt races that year, where he achieved a best finish of sixth at Berlin Raceway, and finished twentieth in the final points standings despite only running nine races. Allison then ran all the short-track and dirt races again in 2005, where he achieved three top-ten finishes with a best result of third at the DuQuoin State Fairgrounds dirt track.

In 2006, Allison only ran five races in the No. 64, and got a best finish of fifth in his first start of the year at Salem after starting tenth. He then entered in the first seven races of the 2007, season, failing to qualify for the first two races at Daytona International Speedway and USA International Speedway, and getting two top-twenty finishes with a best finish of nineteenth at Kansas Speedway. Afterwards, he ran both dirt-track events at the Illinois State Fairgrounds and DuQuoin, finishing 23rd in both events. He has competed in the series since then.

== Motorsports results ==
=== ARCA Re/Max Series ===
(key) (Bold – Pole position awarded by qualifying time. Italics – Pole position earned by points standings or practice time. * – Most laps led. ** – All laps led.)

ARCA Re/Max Series results
Year	Team	No.	Make	1	2	3	4	5	6	7	8	9	10	11	12	13	14	15	16	17	18	19	20	21	22	23	ARMC	Pts	Ref
2004	Dave Allison Motorsports	64	Dodge	DAY	NSH	SLM; 14	KEN	TOL; 26	CLT	KAN	POC	MCH	SBO; 11	BLN; 6	KEN	GTW	POC	LER; 15	NSH	ISF; 24	TOL; 23	DSF; 24	CHI	SLM; 15	TAL		20th	1320	
2005	Dave Allison Motorsports	64	Dodge	DAY	NSH	SLM; 31	KEN	TOL; 17	LAN; 6	MIL; 10	POC	MCH	KAN	KEN	BLN; 20	POC	GTW	LER; 20	NSH	MCH	ISF; 25	TOL; 22	DSF; 3	CHI	SLM; 30	TAL	32nd	1380	
2006	Dave Allison Motorsports	64	Dodge	DAY	NSH	SLM; 5	WIN; 33	KEN; 18	TOL; 29	POC	MCH	KAN	KEN	BLN	POC	GTW	NSH; 15	MCH	ISF	MIL	TOL	DSF	CHI	SLM	TAL	IOW	56th	650	
2007	Dave Allison Motorsports	64	Dodge	DAY; DNQ	USA; DNQ	NSH; 32	SLM; 28	KAN; 19	WIN; 23	KEN; 20	TOL	IOW	POC	MCH	BLN	KEN	POC	NSH	ISF; 23	MIL	GTW	DSF; 23	CHI	SLM	TAL	TOL	33rd	1070	
