= 2005 Formula BMW USA season =

Seasons
- ← 2004 2006 →

The 2005 Formula BMW USA season was the second season of the American Formula BMW championship for young drivers making the transition to car racing. Both the Drivers' Championship and the Rookie Cup were won by Richard Philippe.

== Teams and drivers ==
All cars were Mygale FB02 chassis powered by BMW engines.

Team	No	Driver	Class	Rounds
(Canada) Team Autotecnica	1	(France) Richard Philippe	R	All
(Canada) Jensen MotorSport	2	(United States) Daniel Herrington		All
(Canada) Jensen MotorSport	12	(United States) Jules Duc	R	1–6
(Canada) Jensen MotorSport	33	(United States) Douglas Boyer	R	All
(Canada) Jensen MotorSport	43	(United States) John Zartarian	R	1–4
(United States) Gelles Racing	3	(United States) Justin Moon	R	All
(United States) Gelles Racing	4	(Canada) Ryan Campbell	R	2–7
(United States) Gelles Racing	5	(Belgium) Maxime Soulet		All
(United States) Gelles Racing	6	(United States) Darin Marcus	R	1–6
(United States) Gelles Racing	6	(United States) John Zartarian	R	7
(United States) Gelles Racing		(United States) Ryan Phinny	R	1
(United States) HBR Motorsport USA	7	(United States) Race Johnson	R	All
(United States) HBR Motorsport USA	8	(Australia) James Davison	R	All
(United States) HBR Motorsport USA	9	(United States) Tom Sutherland		All
(United States) HBR Motorsport USA	10	(United States) Reed Stevens	R	All
(Canada) Atlantic Racing Team	11	(Canada) Adrien Herberts	R	All
(Canada) Atlantic Racing Team	13	(Germany) Tobias Hegewald		3–4
(Canada) Atlantic Racing Team		(United States) Daniel Abbale		5–6
(United States) Walker Racing	15	(United States) Jonathan Summerton		3–4
(United States) Walker Racing	25	(United Kingdom) Paul Rees		3
(United States) Walker Racing		(Australia) Michael Patrizi		6
(United States) Walker Racing		(United States) Robbie Pecorari		4
(United States) EuroInternational	16	(Italy) Edoardo Piscopo	R	2–7
(Canada) AIM Motorsport	18	(United States) Rob Bunker	R	All
(Canada) AIM Motorsport	22	(Canada) Kevin Lacroix	R	All
(United States) Twintooth/BRM Motorsport	44	(United States) Matt Lee	R	All
(United States) Team Apex Racing USA	66	(Canada) Robert Wickens	R	All
(United States) Burseth Racing	98	(United States) Derek Burseth		1–5, 7
(United States) DRE Autosport		(United States) Nathan DePagter	R	1–2, 4
(United States) SHD3 with Cinema Concepts		(United States) Scott Harnell	R	2

Icon	Class
R	Rookie Cup

== Races ==
Round		Circuit	Date	Pole position	Fastest lap	Winning driver	Winning team	Winning rookie
1	R1	(United States) Mazda Raceway Laguna Seca	30 April	(France) Richard Philippe	(France) Richard Philippe	(Canada) Kevin Lacroix	(Canada) AIM Motorsport	(Canada) Kevin Lacroix
1	R2	(United States) Mazda Raceway Laguna Seca	1 May	(France) Richard Philippe	(France) Richard Philippe	(France) Richard Philippe	(Canada) Team Autotecnica	(France) Richard Philippe
2	R1	(United States) Mid-Ohio Sports Car Course	21 May	(France) Richard Philippe	(France) Richard Philippe	(Canada) Kevin Lacroix	(Canada) AIM Motorsport	(Canada) Kevin Lacroix
2	R2	(United States) Mid-Ohio Sports Car Course	22 May	(France) Richard Philippe	(Canada) Robert Wickens	(France) Richard Philippe	(Canada) Team Autotecnica	(France) Richard Philippe
3	R1	(Canada) Circuit Gilles Villeneuve	11 June	(Germany) Tobias Hegewald	(France) Richard Philippe	(Canada) Kevin Lacroix	(Canada) AIM Motorsport	(Canada) Kevin Lacroix
3	R2	(Canada) Circuit Gilles Villeneuve	12 June	(Germany) Tobias Hegewald	(Canada) Robert Wickens	(Canada) Robert Wickens	(United States) Team Apex Racing USA	(Canada) Robert Wickens
4	R1	(United States) Indianapolis Motor Speedway	18 June	(United States) Jonathan Summerton	(Australia) James Davison	(Australia) James Davison	(United States) HBR Motorsport USA	(Australia) James Davison
4	R2	(United States) Indianapolis Motor Speedway	19 June	(United States) Jonathan Summerton	(Australia) James Davison	(France) Richard Philippe	(Canada) Team Autotecnica	(France) Richard Philippe
5	R1	(United States) Barber Motorsports Park	30 July	(Canada) Kevin Lacroix	(Canada) Kevin Lacroix	(Canada) Kevin Lacroix	(Canada) AIM Motorsport	(Canada) Kevin Lacroix
5	R2	(United States) Barber Motorsports Park	31 July	(Italy) Edoardo Piscopo	(Italy) Edoardo Piscopo	(Italy) Edoardo Piscopo	(United States) EuroInternational	(Italy) Edoardo Piscopo
6	R1	(United States) Denver	13 August	(France) Richard Philippe	(Italy) Edoardo Piscopo	(Canada) Robert Wickens	(United States) Team Apex Racing USA	(Canada) Robert Wickens
6	R2	(United States) Denver	14 August	(Canada) Robert Wickens	(United States) Reed Stevens	(Italy) Edoardo Piscopo	(United States) EuroInternational	(Italy) Edoardo Piscopo
7	R1	(United States) Road Atlanta	29 September	(Canada) Kevin Lacroix	(France) Richard Philippe	(Italy) Edoardo Piscopo	(United States) EuroInternational	(Italy) Edoardo Piscopo
7	R2	(United States) Road Atlanta	30 September	(France) Richard Philippe	(United States) Daniel Herrington	(United States) Reed Stevens	(United States) HBR Motorsport USA	(United States) Reed Stevens

== Standings ==
Points were awarded as follows:

Position	**1st**	**2nd**	**3rd**	**4th**	**5th**	**6th**	**7th**	**8th**	**9th**	**10th**
Points	20	15	12	10	8	6	4	3	2	1

=== Drivers' Championship ===
Pos	Driver	LAG (United States)		MOH (United States)		CGV (Canada)		IMS (United States)		BAR (United States)		DEN (United States)		ATL (United States)		Pts
1	(France) Richard Philippe	**20**	**1**	**10**	**1**	5	Ret	2	1	2	4	**7**	2	5	**2**	151
2	(Canada) Kevin Lacroix	1	3	1	14	1	Ret	Ret	2	**1**	8	6	4	**4**	6	142
3	(Canada) Robert Wickens	6	4	7	4	3	1	3	3	10	7	1	**5**	8	9	124
4	(United States) Reed Stevens	2	8	6	21	4	2	Ret	5	6	13	3	Ret	2	1	110
5	(Italy) Edoardo Piscopo			16	2	8	16	5	12	DSQ	**1**	4	1	1	3	108
6	(Australia) James Davison	5	5	2	7	WD	WD	1	Ret	4	3	2	11	3	15	104
7	(Belgium) Maxime Soulet	3	2	3	5	6	4	12	7	3	2	10	10	9	11	98
8	(United States) Rob Bunker	7	7	9	11	12	5	17	16	7	6	14	8	Ret	4	41
9	(United States) Tom Sutherland	9	14	8	13	7	7	8	4	5	10	12	7	12	16	39
10	(United States) Race Johnson	10	10	11	6	11	Ret	9	13	8	5	8	3	11	10	37
11	(United States) Justin Moon	11	6	14	3	Ret	Ret	10	9	9	16	13	9	6	14	31
12	(United States) Daniel Herrington	14	Ret	5	12	Ret	6	7	14	11	12	9	Ret	15	5	28
13	(United States) John Zartarian	4	16	4	8	Ret	Ret	11	Ret					13	7	27
14	(United States) Jonathan Summerton					2	12	**6**	**10**							22
15	(Germany) Tobias Hegewald					**Ret**	**3**	4	DSQ							22
16	(United States) Matt Lee	8	9	12	16	DSQ	8	14	15	12	9	Ret	Ret	7	8	17
17	(United States) Douglas Boyer	12	12	15	9	13	Ret	13	11	14	11	11	6	10	12	9
18	(Australia) Michael Patrizi											5	Ret			8
19	(Canada) Adrien Herberts	16	Ret	13	10	10	11	15	6	Ret	15	Ret	Ret	14	13	8
20	(United States) Darin Marcus	15	11	18	17	9	9	19	8	13	14	Ret	14			7
21	(United Kingdom) Paul Rees					15	10									1
22	(Canada) Ryan Campbell			17	18	14	13	Ret	19	Ret	17	16	12	16	17	0
23	(United States) Derek Burseth	17	13	19	20	16	15	Ret	18	16	19			17	18	0
24	(United States) Ryan Phinny	13	18													0
25	(United States) Jules Duc	18	17	20	19	Ret	14	18	20	15	18	15	Ret			0
26	(United States) Nathan DePagter	19	15	Ret	15			16	17							0
27	(United States) Daniel Abbale									Ret	Ret	17	13			0
–	(United States) Robbie Pecorari							Ret	DSQ							–
–	(United States) Scott Harnell			Ret	WD											–
Pos	Driver	LAG (United States)		MOH (United States)		CGV (Canada)		IMS (United States)		BAR (United States)		DEN (United States)		ATL (United States)		Pts

Colour	Result
Gold	Winner
Silver	Second place
Bronze	Third place
Green	Points classification
Blue	Non-points classification
Blue	Non-classified finish (NC)
Purple	Retired, not classified (Ret)
Red	Did not qualify (DNQ)
Red	Did not pre-qualify (DNPQ)
Black	Disqualified (DSQ)
White	Did not start (DNS)
White	Withdrew (WD)
White	Race cancelled (C)
Blank	Did not practice (DNP)
Blank	Did not arrive (DNA)
Blank	Excluded (EX)

**Bold** – Pole
Italics – Fastest Lap

=== Rookie Cup ===
Pos	Driver	LAG (United States)		MOH (United States)		CGV (Canada)		IMS (United States)		BAR (United States)		DEN (United States)		ATL (United States)		Pts
1	(France) Richard Philippe	16	1	7	1	4	Ret	2	1	2	3	6	2	5	2	160
2	(Canada) Kevin Lacroix	1	2	1	11	1	Ret	Ret	2	1	7	5	4	4	5	150
3	(Canada) Robert Wickens	5	3	5	4	2	1	3	3	8	6	1	5	8	8	140
4	(United States) Reed Stevens	2	7	4	17	3	2	Ret	4	4	10	3	Ret	2	1	124
5	(Australia) James Davison	4	4	2	6	WD	WD	1	Ret	3	2	2	9	3	13	117
6	(Italy) Edoardo Piscopo			13	2	5	10	5	9	DSQ	1	4	1	1	3	116
7	(United States) Rob Bunker	6	6	6	10	9	4	12	12	5	5	10	7	Ret	4	62
8	(United States) Race Johnson	8	9	8	5	8	Ret	6	10	6	4	7	3	10	9	61
9	(United States) Justin Moon	9	5	11	3	Ret	Ret	7	7	7	13	9	8	6	12	45
10	(United States) John Zartarian	3	13	3	7	Ret	Ret	8	Ret					11	6	37
11	(United States) Matt Lee	7	8	9	13	DSQ	5	10	11	9	8	Ret	Ret	7	7	31
12	(United States) Douglas Boyer	10	11	12	8	10	Ret	9	8	11	9	8	6	9	10	24
13	(Germany) Tobias Hegewald					Ret	3	4	DSQ							22
14	(United States) Darin Marcus	12	10	15	14	6	6	14	6	10	11	Ret	14			20
15	(Canada) Adrien Herberts	13	Ret	10	9	7	7	11	5	Ret	12	Ret	Ret	12	11	19
16	(Canada) Ryan Campbell			14	15	11	8	Ret	13	Ret	14	12	10	13	14	4
17	(United States) Jules Duc	14	14	16	16	Ret	9	13	14	12	15	11	Ret			2
18	(United States) Ryan Phinny	11	15													0
19	(United States) Nathan DePagter	15	12	Ret	12											0
–	(United States) Scott Harnell			Ret	WD											–
