= Gary Sherman =

Gary Sherman may refer to:

- Gary Sherman (director) (born 1945), film director
- Gary Sherman (politician) (born 1949), jurist and legislator in Wisconsin
- Gary Sherman (racing driver), American stock car racing driver
- Garry Sherman (born 1933), musician, arranger and podiatrist
