= Justin South =

American racing driver

- Born: April 5, 1988 (age 38); Hueytown, Alabama, U.S.

ARCA Menards Series career
- 38 races run over 5 years
- Best finish: 2nd (2007)
- First race: 2004 Eddie Gistrap Motors 200 (Salem)
- Last race: 2013 Allen Crowe Memorial 100 (Illinois)
Wins	Top tens	Poles
0	13	0
- Statistics up to date as of January 10, 2024.

Justin South (born April 5, 1988) is an American professional stock car racing driver who has previously competed in the ARCA Racing Series.

== Racing career ==
South first began his racing career at the age of twelve, driving Bandoleros at Atlanta Motor Speedway.

In 2004, South would make his debut in the ARCA Re/Max Series at Salem Speedway at the age of sixteen, driving the No. 78 Chevrolet for Doug Reid III, where he would start sixteenth and finish second to race winner Jason Jarrett. In 2005, South would compete in select starts in the series, primarily for Don Marcrum and 3-D Motorsports, getting a best finish of fourth at Toledo Speedway. He would also make an additional start for Scott Hillis at Berlin Raceway, where he would finish eleventh. He would remain with Marcrum the following year, departing the team late into the year. He would then run the final two races of the year at Talladega Superspeedway, driving for DGM Racing, and Iowa Speedway, driving for Bob Schacht Motorsports.

In 2007, South would run full-time for Cunningham Motorsports, driving the No. 59 Dodge. Over the course of the year, he would earn one top-five finish and nine top-tens with a best result of third at Toledo in May to finish eighth in the final points standings. He would depart from the team afterwards, citing funding issues a lack of chemistry, and was not able to obtain a ride for the following year.

After his release from Cunningham, South would go on to compete in various series such as the Viper Pro Late Model Series, and the Show Me The Money Pro Late Model Series, finishing second in points in his first year in the latter series. In 2013, South would return to the now ARCA Racing Series, driving the No. 22 for Cunningham at the Illinois State Fairgrounds dirt track, where he would finish seventeenth after starting fifteenth. He has since made starts in series such as the Sunoco Gulf Coast Championship Series, the Southern Super Series, and the CRA JEGS All Star Tour.

== Personal life ==
South father, Jeff, is the owner of Alabama Brick, a brick company based in Pell City, Alabama.

== Motorsports results ==
=== ARCA Racing Series ===
(key) (Bold – Pole position awarded by qualifying time. Italics – Pole position earned by points standings or practice time. * – Most laps led.)

ARCA Racing Series results
Year	Team	No.	Make	1	2	3	4	5	6	7	8	9	10	11	12	13	14	15	16	17	18	19	20	21	22	23	ARSC	Pts	Ref
2004	Doug Reid III	78	Chevy	DAY	NSH	SLM	KEN	TOL	CLT	KAN	POC	MCH	SBO	BLN	KEN	GTW	POC	LER	NSH	ISF	TOL	DSF	CHI	SLM; 2	TAL		105th	220	
2005	3-D Motorsports	78	Chevy	DAY	NSH	SLM; 4	KEN	TOL; 33	LAN	MIL; Wth	POC	MCH	KAN	KEN								TOL; 27	DSF	CHI	SLM; 8	TAL	50th	735	
2005	Scott Hillis	43	Dodge												BLN; 11	POC	GTW	LER	NSH	MCH	ISF						50th	735	
2006	3-D Motorsports	78	Chevy	DAY	NSH	SLM; 13	WIN	KEN	TOL; 14	POC; 28	MCH	KAN	KEN; 14	BLN	POC	GTW	NSH; 26	MCH	ISF	MIL	TOL	DSF	CHI; 9	SLM			35th	1200	
2006	DGM Racing	12	Chevy																						TAL; 14		35th	1200	
2006	Bob Schacht Motorsports	24	Ford																							IOW; 12	35th	1200	
2007	Cunningham Motorsports	59	Dodge	DAY; 30	USA; 9	NSH; 7	SLM; 12	KAN; 13	WIN; 10	KEN; 37	TOL; 3	IOW; 8	POC; 34	MCH; 15	BLN; 8	KEN; 19	POC; 39	NSH; 20	ISF; 30	MIL; 9	GTW; 35	DSF; 10	CHI; 11	SLM; 10	TAL; 38	TOL; 27	8th	4380	
2013	Cunningham Motorsports	22	Dodge	DAY	MOB	SLM	TAL	TOL	ELK	POC	MCH	ROA	WIN	CHI	NJM	POC	BLN	ISF; 17	MAD	DSF	IOW	SLM	KEN	KAN			118th	145	
