= Ryan Foster =

Ryan Foster may refer to:

- Ryan Foster (runner) (born 1988), Australian middle-distance runner
- Ryan Foster (racing driver) (born 1987), American stock-car driver
