= Gary Sherman (racing driver) =

American racing driver

- Born: May 7, 1977 (age 49); Holt, Michigan, U.S.

ARCA Menards Series career
- 10 races run over 3 years
- Best finish: 47th (2005)
- First race: 2005 Request / Sara Lee ARCA 200 by GFS Marketplace (Berlin)
- Last race: 2007 Ansell Protective Gloves 150 (Chicagoland)
| Wins | Top tens | Poles |
|---|---|---|
| 0 | 5 | 0 |
- Statistics up to date as of January 27, 2025.

Gary Sherman (born May 7, 1977) is an American former professional stock car racing driver who has previously competed in the ARCA Racing Series from 2005 to 2007.

Sherman has also competed in the ASA National Tour.

== Motorsports results ==
=== ARCA Re/Max Series ===
(key) (Bold – Pole position awarded by qualifying time. Italics – Pole position earned by points standings or practice time. * – Most laps led.)

ARCA Re/Max Series results
| Year | Team | No. | Make | 1 | 2 | 3 | 4 | 5 | 6 | 7 | 8 | 9 | 10 | 11 | 12 | 13 | 14 | 15 | 16 | 17 | 18 | 19 | 20 | 21 | 22 | 23 | ARSC | Pts | Ref |
|---|---|---|---|---|---|---|---|---|---|---|---|---|---|---|---|---|---|---|---|---|---|---|---|---|---|---|---|---|---|
| 2005 | Cleary Motorsports | 76 | Chevy | DAY | NSH | SLM | KEN | TOL; DNQ | LAN | MIL | POC | MCH | KAN | KEN | BLN; 5 | POC | GTW; 24 | LER; 10 | NSH | MCH | ISF | TOL; DNQ | DSF | CHI | SLM; 7 | TAL | 47th | 740 | |
| 2006 | Cleary Motorsports | 62 | Chevy | DAY | NSH | SLM | WIN | KEN | TOL; 20 | POC | MCH | KAN | KEN | BLN; 4 | POC | GTW | NSH | MCH | ISF | MIL | TOL; 12 | DSF | CHI | | | | 54th | 705 | |
| 2006 | Cleary Motorsports | 1 | Chevy | | | | | | | | | | | | | | | | | | | | | SLM; 7 | TAL | IOW | 54th | 705 | |
| 2007 | Cleary Motorsports | 76 | Chevy | DAY | USA | NSH | SLM | KAN | WIN | KEN | TOL | IOW | POC | MCH | BLN; 13 | KEN | POC | NSH | ISF | MIL | GTW | DSF | CHI | SLM | TAL | TOL; 13 | 77th | 330 | |
