= Ryan Foster (racing driver) =

American racing driver (born 1987)

- Born: August 14, 1987 (age 39); Lowell, Arkansas, U.S.

ARCA Menards Series career
- 22 races run over 1 year
- Best finish: 7th (2006)
- First race: 2006 PFG Lester 150 (Nashville)
- Last race: 2006 Prairie Meadows 250 (Iowa)
Wins	Top tens	Poles
0	8	0
- Statistics up to date as of July 14, 2023.

Ryan Foster (born August 14, 1987) is an American former professional stock car racing driver who has competed in the ARCA Re/Max Series.

== Racing career ==
From 2004 to 2005, Foster competed in various racing series' like the CRA Super Series, the FASCAR Sunbelt Super Late Model Series, the Florida Pro Series, and the Southern All Star Super Late Model Series.

In 2006, Foster would compete full-time in the ARCA Re/Max Series, driving the No. 47 Ford for Tri-State Motorsports as a teammate to then seven-time series champion Frank Kimmel. Although he would fail to qualify for the season opening race at Daytona International Speedway, he would make his debut at the next race at Nashville Superspeedway, where he would start twentieth and finish thirteenth, and would go on to record eight top-tens and four top-fives with a best result of third at the second Michigan International Speedway race. He would then go on the finish seventh in the final points standings and would also finish second in the rookie of the year standings behind Blake Bjorklund.

Foster's most recent start as a driver would come at the Snowball Derby in 2007, where he would finish eighth despite starting 32nd.

== Personal life ==
Foster attended the University of Arkansas with a major in mechanical engineering.

== Motorsports results ==
=== ARCA Re/Max Series ===
(key) (Bold – Pole position awarded by qualifying time. Italics – Pole position earned by points standings or practice time. * – Most laps led.)

ARCA Re/Max Series results
Year	Team	No.	Make	1	2	3	4	5	6	7	8	9	10	11	12	13	14	15	16	17	18	19	20	21	22	23	ARMC	Pts	Ref
2006	Tri-State Motorsports	47	Ford	DAY; DNQ	NSH; 13	SLM; 9	WIN; 6	KEN; 5	TOL; 5	POC; 38	MCH; 14	KAN; 25	KEN; 7	BLN; 8	POC; 11	GTW; 11	NSH; 28	MCH; 3	ISF; 33	MIL; 37	TOL; 34	DSF; 16	CHI; 11	SLM; 35	TAL; 25	IOW; 5	7th	4450	
