= 2007 ARCA Re/Max Series =

American stock car series

2007 ARCA RE/MAX Series

Seasons
- ← 2006 2008 →

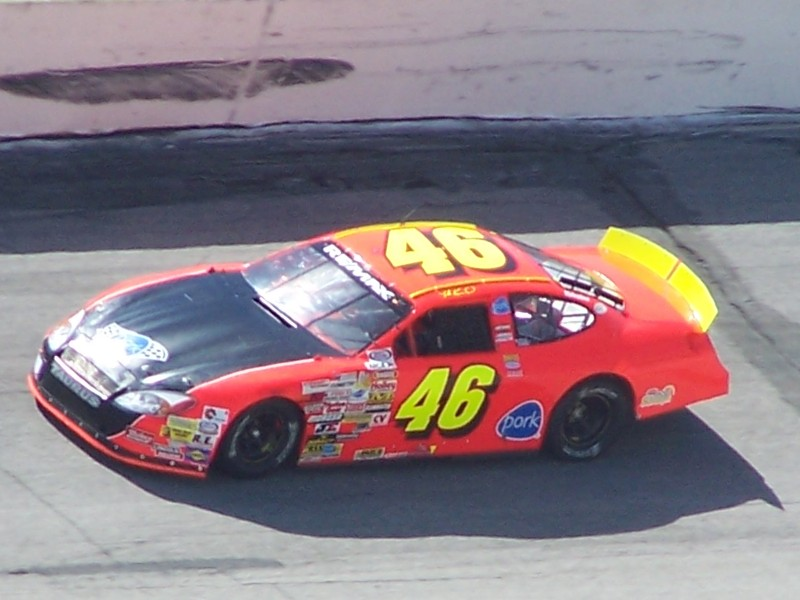
Frank Kimmel, driving the No. 46 car for Clement Racing, the 2007 ARCA champion. This was the last of his 8 consecutive championships in the series as well as his ninth overall title.

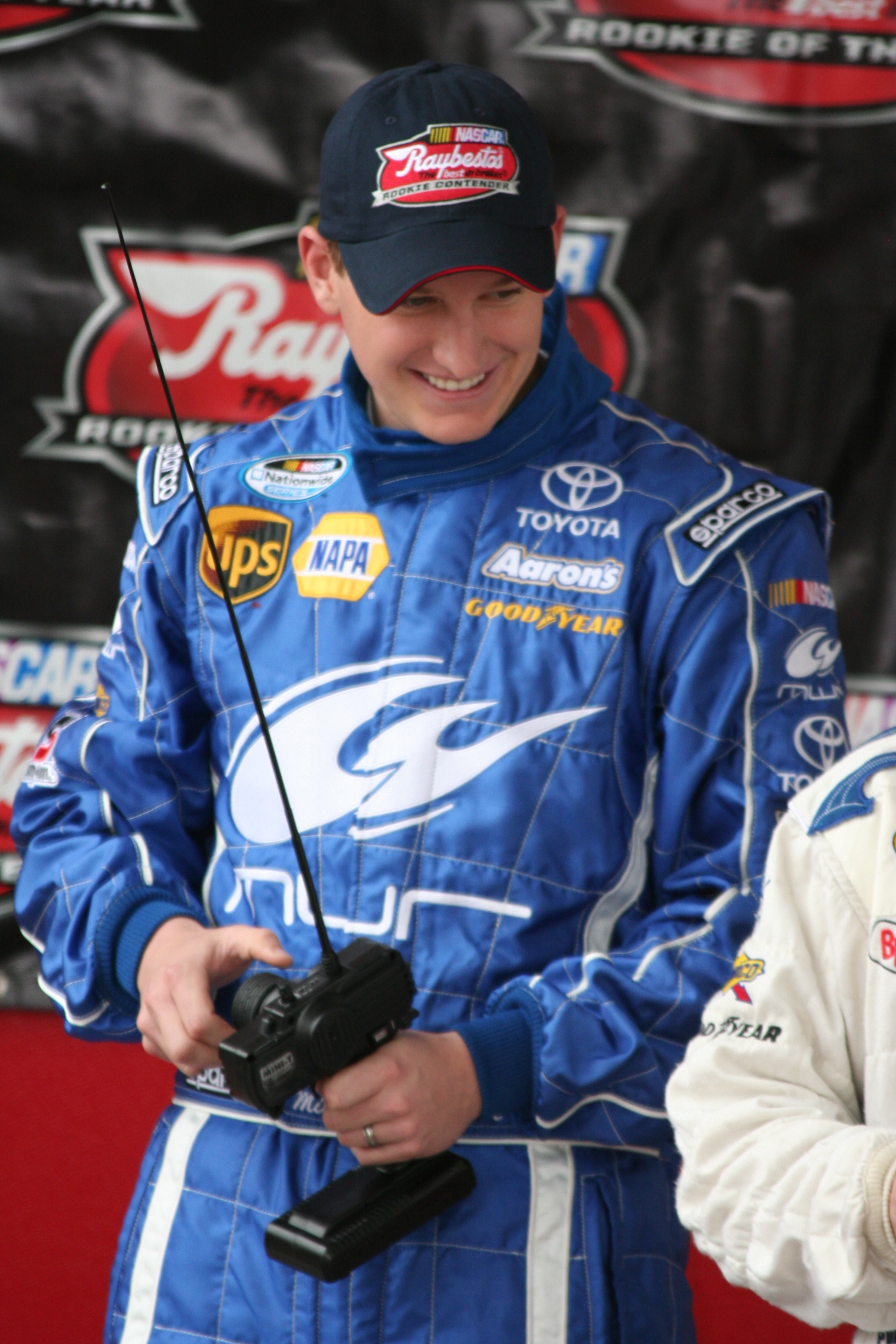
Michael McDowell finished second in the championship standings.

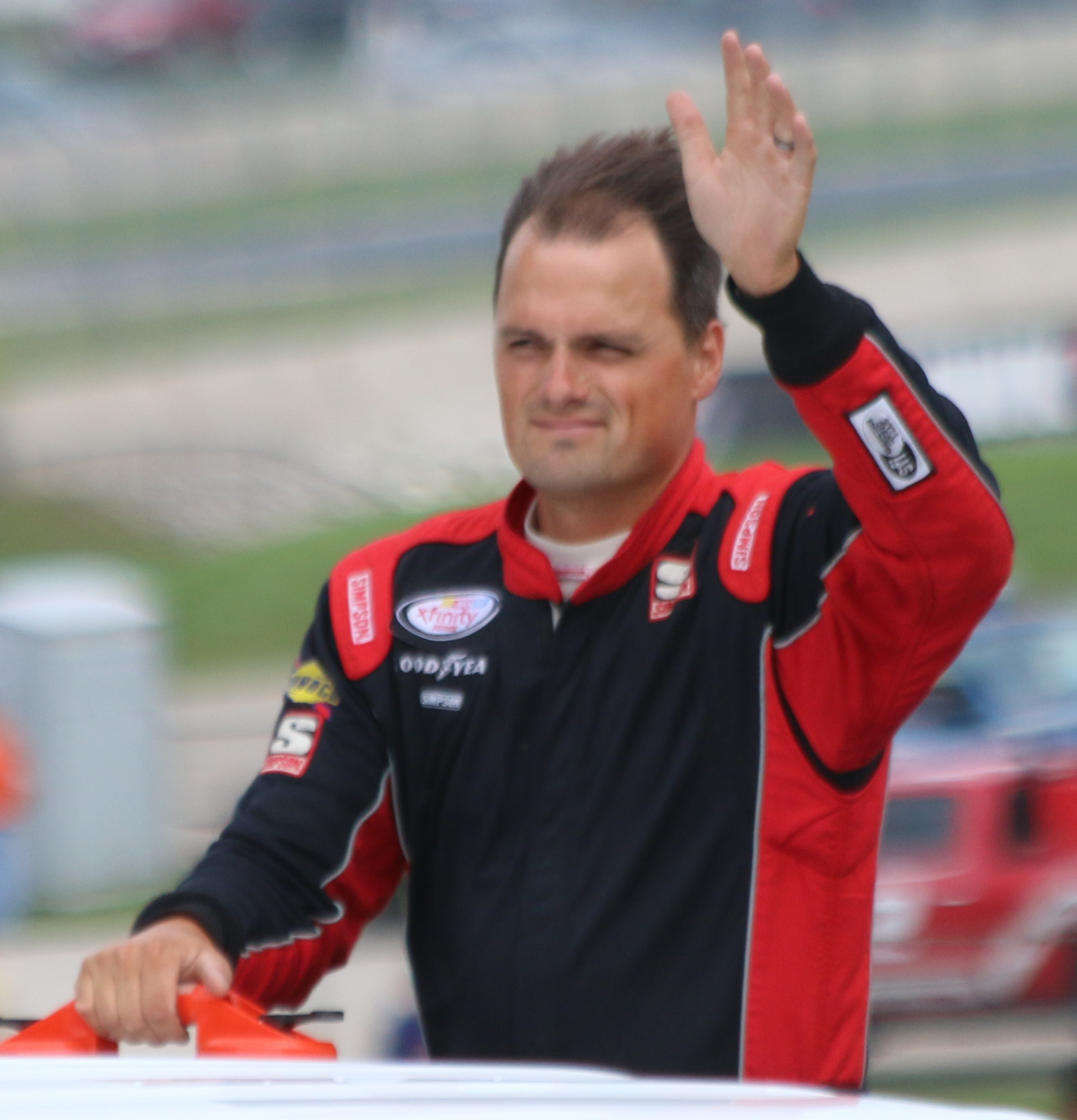
Dexter Bean finished third in the championship standings.

The 2007 ARCA Re/Max Series was the 55th season of the ARCA Racing Series. The season began on February 10, 2007 at Daytona International Speedway with the Daytona ARCA 200 and ended on October 14, 2007 at Toledo Speedway with the Hantz Group 200. Frank Kimmel, driving for Clement Racing, won the season championship, his eighth title in a row and ninth overall.

== Results and standings ==
=== Races ===
Date	Track	City	Event name	Pole winner	Race winner
February 10	Daytona International Speedway	Daytona Beach, Florida	ARCA 200 at Daytona	Erin Crocker	Bobby Gerhart
March 24	USA International Speedway	Lakeland, Florida	Construct Corps-Palm Beach Grading 250	Bobby Santos III	James Buescher
April 7	Nashville Superspeedway	Lebanon, Tennessee	Nashville ARCA 150	Cale Gale	Chad McCumbee
April 22	Salem Speedway	Washington Township, Indiana	Kentuckiana Ford Dealers 200	Michael McDowell	Brian Keselowski
April 27	Kansas Speedway	Kansas City, Kansas	Kansas Lottery $150 Grand	Justin Marks	Scott Lagasse Jr.
May 6	Winchester Speedway	White River Township, Indiana	Winchester ARCA 200	Michael McDowell	Billy Leslie
May 12	Kentucky Speedway	Sparta, Kentucky	Buckle-Up Kentucky 150	Michael McDowell	Erik Darnell
May 20	Toledo Speedway	Toledo, Ohio	Hantz Group 200	Michael McDowell	Ken Butler III
June 2	Iowa Speedway	Newton, Iowa	Prairie Meadows 250	Michael Annett	Frank Kimmel
June 9	Pocono Raceway	Long Pond, Pennsylvania	Pocono 200	Tim Andrews	Chad McCumbee
June 15	Michigan International Speedway	Brooklyn, Michigan	Michigan ARCA 200	Sam Hornish Jr.	Erik Darnell
July 7	Berlin Raceway	Marne, Michigan	Sara Lee-GFS 200	Michael McDowell	Brian Keselowski
July 13	Kentucky Speedway	Sparta, Kentucky	Channel 5 150	Erin Crocker	Michael McDowell
August 4	Pocono Raceway	Long Pond, Pennsylvania	Pennsylvania 200	Bobby Santos III	Michael McDowell
August 11	Nashville Superspeedway	Lebanon, Tennessee	Toyota ARCA 150	Michael McDowell	Jeremy Clements
August 19	Illinois State Fairgrounds Racetrack	Springfield, Illinois	Allen Crowe 100	N/A (Rained out)	Frank Kimmel
August 26	Milwaukee Mile	West Allis, Wisconsin	Governor's Cup 200	Michael McDowell	Frank Kimmel
August 31	Gateway International Speedway	Madison, Illinois	Gateway ARCA 150	Josh Wise	Bryan Clauson
September 3	DuQuoin State Fairgrounds Racetrack	Du Quoin, Illinois	Southern Illinois 100	A. J. Fike	Ken Schrader
September 8	Chicagoland Speedway	Joliet, Illinois	Hantz Group 200	Michael McDowell	Michael McDowell
September 15	Salem Speedway	Washington Township, Indiana	Eddie Gilstrap Motors ARCA Fall Classic	Brian Keselowski	Justin Allgaier
October 5	Talladega Superspeedway	Lincoln, Alabama	ARCA REMAX 250	Bryan Clauson	Michael Annett
October 14	Toledo Speedway	Toledo, Ohio	Hantz Group 200	Michael McDowell	Michael McDowell

=== Drivers' championship ===
(key) Bold – Pole position awarded by time. Italics – Pole position set by final practice results or rainout. * – Most laps led.

Pos.	Driver	Races																							Points
Pos.	Driver	DAY	LAK	NSH	SLM	KAN	WIN	KEN	TOL	IOW	POC	MCH	BER	KEN	POC	NSH	ISF	MIL	GTW	DQN	CHI	SLM	TAL	TOL	Points
1	Frank Kimmel	5	7	10	22	15	3	12	4	1*	7	13	7	10	25	3	1*	1	12	5	6	2	2	5	5705
2	Michael McDowell	10	18	33	**3**	11	**22***	**39**	**7***	2	6	8	**2***	1*	1	**19**	2	**4**	3*	36	**1***	3	33	**1***	5455
3	Dexter Bean	16	28	9	2	10	8	15	17	11	2*	12	15	20	7	7	5	8	33	11	7	34	26	34	4890
4	Justin Allgaier	7	4	11	10	8	29	10	14	7	8	31	5	40	6	30	11	23	4	22	27	1	13	26	4855
5	Justin Marks	22	32	13	20	**6**	5	35	11	18	29	20	11	41	38	12	4	2*	8	7	2	9	8	7	4795
6	Phillip McGilton	9	13	17	7	18	30	8	27	4	19	6	14	29	30	14	10	3	11	14	26	28	21	10	4745
7	Patrick Sheltra	DNQ	11	25	11	12	19	9	28	20	24	14	4	18	11	13	3	36	29	6	13	14	16	8	4615
8	Justin South	30	9	7	12	13	10	37	3	8	34	15	8	19	39	20	30	9	35	10	11	10	38	27	4380
9	Bryan Silas	23	10	37	8	22	21	33	15	13	18	32	16	8	27	16	19	13	13	37	24	29	22	28	4135
10	Josh Krug	DNQ	21	21	24	16	18	13	30	9	17	35	10	32	9	38	25	5	22	12	15	21	23	30	4080
11	Gabi DiCarlo	DNQ	22	20	34	23	11	32	23	14	32	19	24	26	18	23	18	15	20	18	21	16	24	22	3960
12	Norm Benning	24	23	29	15	29	13	25	13	23	22	26	18	30	19	22	17	14	23	34	18	20	40	23	3940
13	Dominick Casola		17	34	25	17	25	16	18	16	14	25	23	36	8	17	13	27	5	17	38	15	3	21	3920
14	Mike Harmon	29	24	27	14	24	32	18	34	17	16	23	20	27	10	24	38	31	19	26	17	19	DNQ	17	3790
15	Darrell Basham	18	19	28	23	28	12	26	26	27	33	28	19	31	35	37	20	17	31	32	37	27	DNQ	19	3470
16	Brad Smith	19	30	31	19	26	15	28	29	29	31	29	28	35	40	25	21	19	25	31	23	22	DNQ	DNQ	3355
17	Tim Mitchell	DNQ	25	DNQ	29	31	14	30	21	30	26	40	25	28	21	27	41	21	24	27	DNQ	23	DNQ	DNQ	3105
18	Jason Hedlesky	27	29	15	35	15	9	19	25	10	11	18	21	11	DNQ	29			28		14		14		3010
19	Bobby Gerhart	1*	26	14	27	9	4	11	5	6	10	11	6	22	28										2845
20	Mike Koch	DNQ	34	35	DNQ	41	31	DNQ	22	33	36	37	26	DNQ	23	35	24	26	37	38	39	24	DNQ	DNQ	2610
21	Erin Crocker	**20**		3		7		2			20	3		**5**	4	6			17		5		18		2240
22	Brian Keselowski	DNQ	5		1*		2		6			10	1			5		22	18		40	**25***		31	2020
23	Jeremy Clements	3		12		35		40			4	5		7	3	1*			36		4		6		2000
24	Billy Leslie				21		1		8	28		17	29					6	14			30	37	25	1685
25	Todd Bowsher	15	35	38	32	39	27	23	20				12				16			35		18		6	1660
26	Josh Wise	36		23		5	7				9			34	2		40		**2**	2	35		35		1640
27	Ken Butler III		20		33			31	1	22		7	9			11		32				11		14	1610
28	Marc Mitchell	2		8		40				15	40			17	5	39		7	30		31		20		1505
29	Billy Tanner	21						17	19	24	27			37	14	21	26	29	16		19		36		1460
30	James Buescher		1		6												7	28				4		2	1405
31	Billy Venturini	28	14	19	9				10											8	10		5	DC	1355
32	Bryan Clauson		2							5				14		2			1				**11**		1245
33	Josh Allison	DNQ	DNQ	32	28	19	23	20									23			23					1070
34	Mario Gosselin	13	12	36	DC	4					5										30		12		1060
35	Robb Brent		16						35			16		12		10					33		27	35	920
36	Terry Jones	DNQ			13		6		12	DNQ	37	27		DNQ										15	905
37	Nick Tucker		15	30	16	27	26	21																7	900
38	Michael Annett									**3**						8			6				1*		880
39	Ken Schrader				5				2								8			1*					865
40	Bobby Santos III		**33***	18		32		3						3	**34**								41		835
41	Blake Feese			DNQ		3								6		9					9				815
42	Brett Hudson				4									9							8	5			795
43	Scott Lagasse Jr.	8		4		1*		4																	780
44	Tim Andrews			6							**3**	24		24									31		740
45	Tom Berte					33		DNQ		19	13			23	29			16							740
46	Rob Bunker				30		24		32		25			25	12						29				725
47	Erik Darnell					2		1*				1*													700
48	Cale Gale			**2***										2		4									680
49	Chad McCumbee	31	38	1	26						1														650
50	Michelle Theriault		36					22								28			15		34			11	650
51	Colin Braun																		9		3		9		595
52	Kory Rabenold								DNQ		12				16			34						16	555
53	Andy Lally																	10	7		12				545
54	Richard Johns			16				14															4		525
55	Bill Baird	12	37														34			29			19		495
56	Todd Hansen					14		36		31				33		34		35			DNQ				490
57	John Graham			DNQ		37	16	27						DNQ				24					DNQ		475
58	Josh Clemons	DNQ			31									DNQ		DNQ						13		18	455
59	Joey Miller			39											31					9	16				445
60	Ron Cox			24													9			21					425
61	Bryan Reffner									12				15							28				420
62	Michael Simko																					6		3	415
63	Frank Kapfhammer			DNQ		21		34						39		18					DNQ				410
64	John Jackson		8			34															20		DNQ		410
65	Greg Seevers			DNQ	DNQ		DNQ	DNQ	DNQ	37			33		DNQ		39	38	40	39				DNQ	400
66	Dugan Basham		DNQ		DNQ	DNQ	33	DNQ	DNQ	34			32	DNQ		DNQ						DNQ			395
67	Peter Shepherd III											21		DNQ					21		22				390
68	Wayne Peterson			DNQ	DNQ			DNQ		35	DNQ	DNQ		DNQ	DNQ		37	39	DC	DNQ					385
69	Chad Blount			5				5																	385
70	Adam Edwards		DNQ						33	32	41				17				39						370
71	Wayne Edwards				DNQ		20	29	DNQ			39										32			370
72	Mark Gibson		39									DNQ					15			15					370
73	Tim McCreadie											4											15		365
74	Dan Brode							DNQ	DNQ	21				DNQ		36								24	360
75	Kelly Kovski																6			16					350
76	Ray Mooi												27									33		9	345
77	Gary Sherman												13											13	330
78	Mark Dimitroff				DNQ		17		24			DNQ												DNQ	330
79	Carl Long																		10		32	31			325
80	Dustin Delaney																14	37		24					315
81	Jeff Caudell				17																	12			315
82	Dale Schweikart										15				15										310
83	Tim Russell	25	6																						305
84	Troy Wangerin	DNQ								26		DNQ						20					DNQ		305
85	Alex Yontz							38						6							36				300
86	Mike Buckley								9									25							290
87	Damon Lusk	26										9													285
88	A. J. Fike																35			**4**					285
89	A. J. Henriksen	40	DNQ								38	34			26										255
90	Billy Pauch Jr.										28				13										255
91	Julien Penaruiz		40												DNQ			41	27		DNQ	DNQ	DNQ		250
92	Sam Hornish Jr.											**2**													240
93	Steve Blackburn							24						21											235
94	Phil Bozell				DNQ											40		11							235
95	Brett Butler																					17		29	230
96	Brent Cross										23				24										225
97	Mark Littleton																28			19					225
98	Brian Scott													13									34		225
99	Chris Cockrum	DNQ		26		36								DNQ							DNQ				225
100	Jim Hollenbeck								DNQ			36	17												220
101	Matt Hagans							7				DNQ													220
102	Wayne Anderson		3																						215
103	Josh Richards																			3					215
104	Marc Davis																							4	210
105	David Ragan	4																							210
106	Ricky Gonzalez															DNQ		18	38						205
107	Wes O'Dell																27			25					200
108	James Hylton											DNQ			22			40						DNQ	200
109	Jesus Hernandez							6																	200
110	Timothy Peters	6																							200
111	Tom Hessert III																33			20					195
112	Scott Speed																						7		195
113	Jake Francis																	12						DNQ	195
114	Jeremy Petty									25									34	DNQ					190
115	Chuck Barnes Jr.																					8			190
116	Justin Ashburn	DNQ		DNQ	18																				190
117	Kenny Adams																22			33					185
118	Max Dumarey																						10		180
119	Brett Rowe								31										26						175
120	Dawayne Bryan	11																							175
121	Alex García			DNQ		DNQ						21													175
122	John Gill																12								170
123	Bob Strait																							12	170
124	Butch Jarvis	17																					DNQ		170
125	Ted Olswfski										39				20										165
126	Eddie Pearson																			13					165
127	Ryan Howard	14																							160
128	Ryan Fischer																		32				29		155
129	Jay Middleton															15									155
130	Larry Hollenbeck											30									DNQ		DNQ	DNQ	155
131	Amber Koch								DNQ	36							31								150
132	Landon Cassill													38	32*										150
133	Ryan Lawler													16		DC									150
134	Matt Merrell								16																150
135	Dario Franchitti																						17		145
136	Rance Hume												22	DNQ		DC									145
137	Michael Phelps																							20	130
138	Jennifer Jo Cobb	DNQ				25																			130
139	Johnny Sauter										21														125
140	David Breen		DNQ				DNQ		DNQ				31												125
141	Wayman Wittman														37	31									120
142	Mike Duncan			22																					120
143	Dicky Williamson	DNQ	27																						120
144	Ryan Hackett										DNQ			DNQ		32									120
145	Joe Cooksey																29			DNQ					110
146	Pierre Bourque																				25				105
147	Eric McClure																						25		105
148	David Ray Boggs																32			40					100
149	Tim Turner														36		36								100
150	Deborah Renshaw															26									100
151	Hans-Peter Schaeppi																					26			100
152	Dan Fredrickson						28																		90
153	Mark Thompson																						28		90
154	Stan Yingling																			28					90
155	Jason Basham					38						38													80
156	Dustin Boney					30																			80
157	Doug Keller																			30					80
158	Eddie Mercer																						30		80
159	Art Seeger										30														80
160	Billy Shotko												30												80
161	Rick Tackman																	30							80
162	Ryan Mathews		31																						75
163	Chase Austin																						32		70
164	Brad Coleman	32																							70
165	Jesse Smith																							32	70
166	Michael Faulk	33																							65
167	Travis Kvapil														34										65
168	Tayler Malsam																							33	65
169	Tim Schendel																	33							65
170	Chris Wimmer											33													65
171	Ron Young															33									65
172	Benny Chastain	38																					DNQ		65
173	Rob Jones						34																		60
174	Brandon Whitt	34																							60
175	J. R. Heffner	35																							55
176	Paul Menard										35														55
177	Brian Conz	37																							45
178	Mike Ciochetti																						39		35
179	Steve Wallace	39																							35
180	J. R. Norris			40																					30
181	Greg Barnhart	41																							25
	Andy Belmont	DNQ																							25
	Tony Ave	DNQ																							25
	Skip Cummins	DNQ																							25
	Roger Carter	DNQ																							25
	Shane Brafford	DNQ																							25
	Chase Pistone	DNQ																							25
	Brian Weber	DNQ																							25
	Steadman Marlin	DNQ																							25
	Gerry Bruce	DNQ																							25
	Bill Catania	DNQ																							25
	Ed Kennedy	DNQ																					DNQ		25
	Mike Zazula										DNQ														25
	Curt Tori												DNQ											DNQ	25
	Brian Kaltreider														DNQ						DNQ				25
	Clay Greenfield															DNQ									25
	Jeff Flesher																			DNQ					25
	Jeff Williams																					DNQ			25
	Kerry Earnhardt																						DNQ		25
	Bobby Norfleet																						DNQ		25
	Scotty Ellis																						DNQ		25
	Ricky Sanders																							DNQ	25
	Free Pennington																							DNQ	25
	David Reutimann										DC														

== See also ==
- 2007 NASCAR Nextel Cup Series
- 2007 NASCAR Busch Series
- 2007 NASCAR Craftsman Truck Series
- 2007 NASCAR Busch East Series
- 2007 NASCAR Whelen Modified Tour
- 2007 NASCAR Whelen Southern Modified Tour
- 2007 NASCAR Canadian Tire Series
- 2007 NASCAR Corona Series
