= Rob Bunker =

American racing driver (born 1988)

- Born: Robert Bunker III; September 8, 1988 (age 38) Bridgewater, New Jersey, U.S.

ARCA Re/Max Series career
- Debut season: 2007
- Former teams: Cunningham Motorsports
- Starts: 7
- Wins: 0
- Poles: 0
- Best finish: 46th in 2007
- Finished last season: 46th (2007)
- Statistics up to date as of April 28, 2020.

Robert Bunker III (born September 8, 1988) is an American professional racing driver. He most recently competed part-time in a sprint car racing series in 2008. Most notably, he ran part-time in the ARCA Re/Max Series in 2007, driving the No. 4 Dodge for Cunningham Motorsports. Prior to that, Bunker competed in the Star Mazda Championship and Formula BMW Series.

== Racing career ==
Bunker began kart racing in 1998. He won his first track championship in 1999, and would follow that up with another one in 2001. In 2000, Bunker began competing on a national level in the World Karting Association, securing three national event wins by 2003.

In 2004, Bunker competed in four Formula TR (Formula Renault 1600) events scoring one qualifying pole and two podium finishes in only four events. In 2005, Bunker competed in the Formula BMW USA championship for AIM Autosport, finishing eighth in points. That year, he was teammates with current NASCAR Canada Series driver Kevin Lacroix. He moved to the Star Mazda Series in 2006 with AIM and finished 13th in points with one podium finish.

In 2007, Bunker signed with Cunningham Motorsports and Dodge's driver development program to compete in seven ARCA Re/Max Series races, driving their No. 4 car. He had previously debuted for the team in a test session in November 2006. He finished the season 46th in points with a best finish of 12th at Pocono Raceway.

Bunker did not return to the Cunningham team or the ARCA Series altogether in 2008. That year, he joined the Ventura Racing Association (VRA) Sprint Car Series, competing in nine races for Cory Kruseman Racing.

== Personal life ==
Bunker is from Bridgewater Township, New Jersey and graduated from Bridgewater-Raritan High School.

== Motorsports career results ==
=== ARCA Re/Max Series ===
(key) (Bold – Pole position awarded by qualifying time. Italics – Pole position earned by points standings or practice time. * – Most laps led.)

ARCA Re/Max Series results
Year	Team	No.	Make	1	2	3	4	5	6	7	8	9	10	11	12	13	14	15	16	17	18	19	20	21	22	23	ARSC	Pts	Ref
2007	Cunningham Motorsports	4	Dodge	DAY	USA	NSH	SLM; 30	KAN	WIN; 24	KEN	TOL; 32	IOW	POC; 25	MCH	BLN	KEN; 25	POC; 12	NSH	ISF	MIL	GTW	DSF	CHI; 29	SLM	TAL	TOL	46th	725	
