= Joey Miller =

American racing driver

- Nationality: (United States) American
- Born: Joseph Miller; January 22, 1985 (age 41) Lakeville, Minnesota, U.S.

ARCA Menards Series career
- Debut season: 2004
- Former teams: Hagans Racing, Country Joe Racing, Win-Tron Racing, Joey Miller Racing
- Starts: 32
- Wins: 5
- Poles: 6
- Best finish: 2nd in 2005
- Finished last season: 92nd (2012)

Previous series
- 2004, 2006: NASCAR Busch Series

Awards
- 2005: 2005 ARCA Re/Max Series Rookie of the Year

NASCAR FedEx Freight Truck Series career
- 20 races run over 2 years
- Best finish: 31st (2006)
- First race: 2005 Las Vegas 350 (Las Vegas)
- Last race: 2006 O'Reilly Auto Parts 200 (Bristol)
Wins	Top tens	Poles
0	2	0
- Statistics up to date as of March 16, 2020.

Joseph Miller (born January 22, 1985) is an American former professional stock car racing driver in the American Speed Association, the ARCA Re/Max Series and the NASCAR Craftsman Truck Series.

== Career ==
Miller grew up in the Lakeville, Minnesota, area. He began racing quarter midgets at the age of 12 and eventually ran various hobby stock series races, winning many races. He had 22 starts in the American Speed Association with three top-tens. He also competed in the ARCA RE/MAX Series, winning his first start in 2004 and scoring four more wins in his rookie year (2005) with Country Joe Racing. He easily clinched 2005 Rookie of the Year but finished second to Frank Kimmel for the championship.

In 2006, Miller attempted the full schedule in the Craftsman Truck Series, driving the No. 12 Toyota Tundra for Darrell Waltrip Motorsports. After fourteen starts and a fifth-place finish at Mansfield Motorsports Speedway, he was released from his ride due to a lack of sponsorship.

Miller competed infrequently in the ARCA series with his old family-owned team, but the team eventually sold all of its equipment. Miller returned to the ARCA series for one last race at the Pocono Raceway on August 5, 2007, but he crashed in an accident not of his doing. In the post-incident interview, he said that he was returning to help run the family housing business in Minnesota and that he would probably not race again. However, in late August 2011, Miller returned to the ARCA Racing Series at the Madison International Speedway with Win-Tron Racing's No. 32 Champion Oil Dodge. Miller now owns a home building business named Country Joe Homes and resides in the Twin Cities area. He runs Super Late models at Elko Speedway on Saturday nights during the summer.

== Motorsports career results ==
=== NASCAR ===
(key) (Bold – Pole position awarded by qualifying time. Italics – Pole position earned by points standings or practice time. * – Most laps led.)

==== Busch Series ====
NASCAR Busch Series results
Year	Team	No.	Make	1	2	3	4	5	6	7	8	9	10	11	12	13	14	15	16	17	18	19	20	21	22	23	24	25	26	27	28	29	30	31	32	33	34	35	NBSC	Pts	Ref
2004	Country Joe Racing	98	Dodge	DAY	CAR	LVS	DAR	BRI	TEX	NSH	TAL	CAL	GTY	RCH	NZH	CLT	DOV	NSH	KEN	MLW	DAY	CHI	NHA	PPR	IRP	MCH	BRI	CAL	RCH	DOV	KAN	CLT	MEM	ATL	PHO; DNQ	DAR	HOM		N/A	0	
2006	Michael Waltrip Racing	99	Dodge	DAY	CAL	MXC	LVS	ATL	BRI	TEX	NSH	PHO	TAL	RCH	DAR	CLT	DOV	NSH	KEN	MLW	DAY	CHI	NHA	MAR	GTY	IRP	GLN	MCH	BRI	CAL	RCH	DOV	KAN	CLT	MEM; 36	TEX	PHO	HOM	134th	55	

^{*} Season still in progress
^{1} Ineligible for series points

==== Craftsman Truck Series ====
NASCAR Craftsman Truck Series results
Year	Team	No.	Make	1	2	3	4	5	6	7	8	9	10	11	12	13	14	15	16	17	18	19	20	21	22	23	24	25	NCTC	Pts	Ref
2005	Darrell Waltrip Motorsports	12	Toyota	DAY	CAL	ATL	MAR	GTY	MFD	CLT	DOV	TEX	MCH	MLW	KAN	KEN	MEM	IRP	NSH	BRI	RCH	NHA	LVS; 15	MAR	ATL; 10	TEX; 25	PHO; 15	HOM; 13	40th	587	
2006	Darrell Waltrip Motorsports	12	Toyota	DAY; 33	CAL; 13	ATL; 36	MAR; 16	GTY; 29	CLT; 22	MFD; 5	DOV; 32	TEX; 30	MCH; 20	MLW; 23	KAN; 30	KEN; 13	MEM; 20	IRP	NSH	BRI; 19	NHA	LVS	TAL	MAR	ATL	TEX	PHO	HOM	31st	1429	

=== ARCA Racing Series ===
ARCA Racing Series results
Year	Team	No.	Make	1	2	3	4	5	6	7	8	9	10	11	12	13	14	15	16	17	18	19	20	21	22	23	ARSC	Pts	Ref
2004	Hagans Racing	9	Dodge	DAY	NSH	SLM	KEN	TOL	CLT	KAN	POC	MCH	SBO	BLN	KEN	GTW	POC	LER	NSH; 1	ISF	TOL	DSF	CHI; 41	SLM	TAL		80th	315	
2005	Hagans Racing	9	Dodge	DAY; 7	NSH; 2	SLM; 6	KEN; 3	TOL; 8	LAN; 2	MIL; 2	POC; 3	MCH; 28	**KAN**; 5	KEN; 3	**BLN**; 1	**POC**; 34	GTW; 1	**LER**; 28	**NSH**; 1	MCH; 38	ISF; 11	TOL; 8	DSF; 6	**CHI**; 3	SLM; 1	TAL; 38	2nd	5575	
2006	Hagans Racing	15	Dodge	DAY	NSH	SLM	WIN	KEN	TOL	POC	MCH	KAN	KEN	BLN	POC	GTW	NSH	MCH	ISF	MIL	TOL	DSF	CHI	SLM	TAL	IOW; 41	175th	40	
2007	Country Joe Racing	32	Dodge	DAY	USA	NSH; 39	SLM	KAN	WIN	KEN	TOL	IOW	POC	MCH	BLN	KEN	POC; 31	NSH	ISF	MIL	GTW	DSF; 9	CHI; 16	SLM	TAL	TOL	59th	445	
2011	Win-Tron Racing	32	Dodge	DAY	TAL	SLM	TOL	NJE	CHI	POC	MCH	WIN	BLN	IOW	IRP	POC	ISF	MAD; 8	DSF	SLM	KAN	TOL					96th	190	
2012	Joey Miller Racing	20	Dodge	DAY	MOB	SLM	TAL	TOL	ELK; 6	POC	MCH	WIN	NJE	IOW	CHI	IRP	POC	BLN	ISF	MAD	SLM	DSF	KAN				92nd	200	
