= Blake Bjorklund =

American stock car racing driver (born 1985)

- Born: September 8, 1985 (age 41); Isanti, Minnesota, U.S.

NASCAR O'Reilly Auto Parts Series career
- 3 races run over 1 year
- Best finish: 109th (2007)
- First race: 2007 Camping World 300 Presented by RVs.com (Fontana)
- Last race: 2007 Arizona Travel 200 (Phoenix)
Wins	Top tens	Poles
0	0	0

NASCAR FedEx Freight Truck Series career
- 15 races run over 1 year
- Best finish: 29th (2007)
- First race: 2007 Chevy Silverado HD 250 (Daytona)
- Last race: 2007 Toyota Tundra 200 (Nashville)
Wins	Top tens	Poles
0	0	0
- Statistics up to date as of August 22, 2012.

Blake Bjorklund (born September 8, 1985) is an American professional stock car racing driver. He has raced in the NASCAR Craftsman Truck Series, Nationwide Series, and the ARCA Re/Max Series. In addition to racing stock cars, he has also raced snowmobiles.

== Racing career ==
=== ARCA Re/Max Series ===
Before his venture into NASCAR, Bjorklund raced in the series full-time for one year in 2006. He made a run for Rookie of the Year with Country Joe Racing, a team well known for developing young talents such as Joey Miller and Ryan Hemphill. Although he failed to qualify for the season-opening Daytona and Nashville races, he bounced back with poles at Berlin and Milwaukee and earned his first career victory at Salem Speedway, passing ARCA legend Frank Kimmel with two laps to go. Bjorklund also earned the Bill France Triple Crown award for the three dirt tracks on the ARCA schedule. He finished the season fifth in points with one win, ten finishes in the top-ten, and two poles.

=== Craftsman Truck Series ===
In 2007, Bjorklund was signed by MRD Motorsports to run in the NASCAR Craftsman Truck Series. Driving the No. 8 Chevrolet Silverado, he earned a best finish of 13th place at Nashville Superspeedway.

=== Nationwide Series ===
After his release from his truck ride, Bjorklund was signed late in 2007 by Jay Robinson Racing to drive the No. 28 U.S. Border Patrol/Kibbles 'n Bits Chevrolet in three races. Two of his races were ended early by engine failures and he was only able to muster a best finish of 30th at California Speedway.

In 2009, Bjorklund returned to the Nationwide Series in the Meijer 300 at Kentucky Speedway, but failed to qualify the No. 96 K-Automotive Motorsports Dodge.

== Motorsports career results ==
=== NASCAR ===
(key) (Bold – Pole position awarded by qualifying time. Italics – Pole position earned by points standings or practice time. * – Most laps led.)

==== Nationwide Series ====
NASCAR Nationwide Series results
Year	Team	No.	Make	1	2	3	4	5	6	7	8	9	10	11	12	13	14	15	16	17	18	19	20	21	22	23	24	25	26	27	28	29	30	31	32	33	34	35	NNSC	Pts	Ref
2007	Jay Robinson Racing	28	Chevy	DAY	CAL	MXC	LVS	ATL	BRI	NSH	TEX	PHO	TAL	RCH	DAR	CLT	DOV	NSH	KEN	MLW	NHA	DAY	CHI	GTY	IRP	CGV	GLN	MCH	BRI	CAL; 30	RCH	DOV	KAN	CLT; 35	MEM	TEX	PHO; 33	HOM	109th	195	
2009	Whitney Motorsports	96	Dodge	DAY	CAL	LVS	BRI	TEX	NSH	PHO	TAL	RCH	DAR	CLT	DOV	NSH	KEN; DNQ	MLW	NHA	DAY	CHI	GTY	IRP	IOW	GLN	MCH	BRI	CGV	ATL	RCH	DOV	KAN	CAL	CLT	MEM	TEX	PHO	HOM	N/A	0	

==== Craftsman Truck Series ====
NASCAR Craftsman Truck Series results
Year	Team	No.	Make	1	2	3	4	5	6	7	8	9	10	11	12	13	14	15	16	17	18	19	20	21	22	23	24	25	NCTC	Pts	Ref
2007	MRD Motorsports	8	Chevy	DAY; 25	CAL; 31	ATL; 20	MAR; 19	KAN; 34	CLT; 20	MFD; 32	DOV; 16	TEX; 19	MCH; 21	MLW; 27	MEM; 25	KEN; 33	IRP; 27	NSH; 13	BRI	GTW	NHA	LVS	TAL	MAR	ATL	TEX	PHO	HOM	29th	1355	

=== ARCA Re/Max Series ===
ARCA Re/Max Series results
Year	Team	No.	Make	1	2	3	4	5	6	7	8	9	10	11	12	13	14	15	16	17	18	19	20	21	22	23	ARSC	Pts	Ref
2006	Country Joe Racing	0	Dodge	DAY; DNQ																							5th	4655	
2006	Country Joe Racing	32	Dodge		NSH; DNQ	SLM; 8	WIN; 30	KEN; 7	TOL; 15	POC; 33	MCH; 3	KAN; 37	KEN; 10	**BLN**; 3*	POC; 32	GTW; 6	NSH; 11	MCH; 13	ISF; 12	**MIL**; 18	TOL; 3	DSF; 5	CHI; 2	SLM; 1	TAL; 28	IOW; 28	5th	4655	
