= Win-Tron Racing =

Stock car racing team

- Owner: Kevin Cywinski
- Base: Mooresville, North Carolina
- Series: NASCAR Camping World Truck Series; ARCA Menards Series
- Manufacturer: Chevrolet
- Opened: 2007
- Closed: 2021

Career
- Race victories: 1
- Pole positions: 0

Win-Tron Racing (formerly known as Country Joe Racing) was an American professional stock car racing team that competed in both the NASCAR Camping World Truck Series and the ARCA Menards Series. The team merged into Truck Series team AM Racing beginning in 2021.

After the team previously reduced its Truck Series operation to part-time in 2015 and 2016 due to lack of sponsorship, Win-Tron partially took over operation of Self's family-owned team starting at Bristol in August 2015. This came several months after fielding an ARCA car for Self at Daytona as a teammate to regular driver Shane Lee. This partnership ended when Self closed his own team and drove for Niece Motorsports in 2018.

== History ==
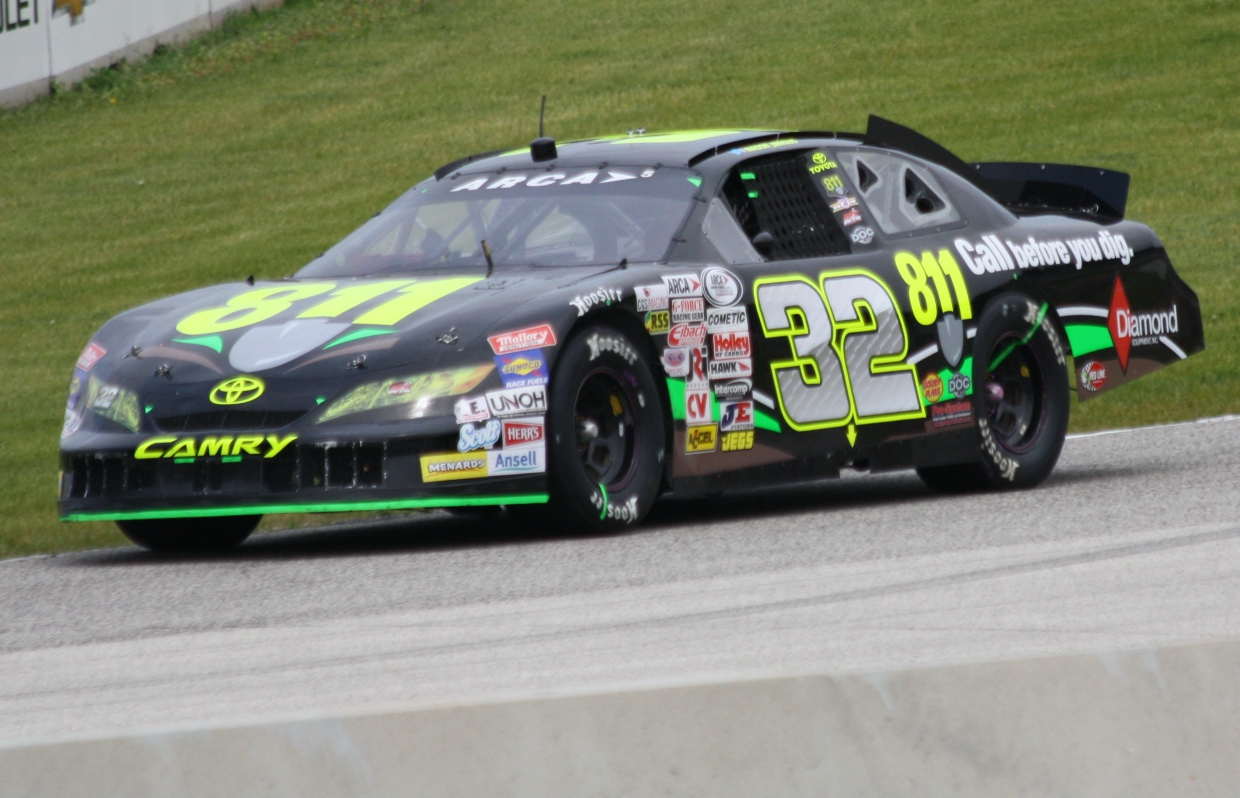
Mason Mingus drove full-time in the No. 32 for Win-Tron in ARCA in 2013.

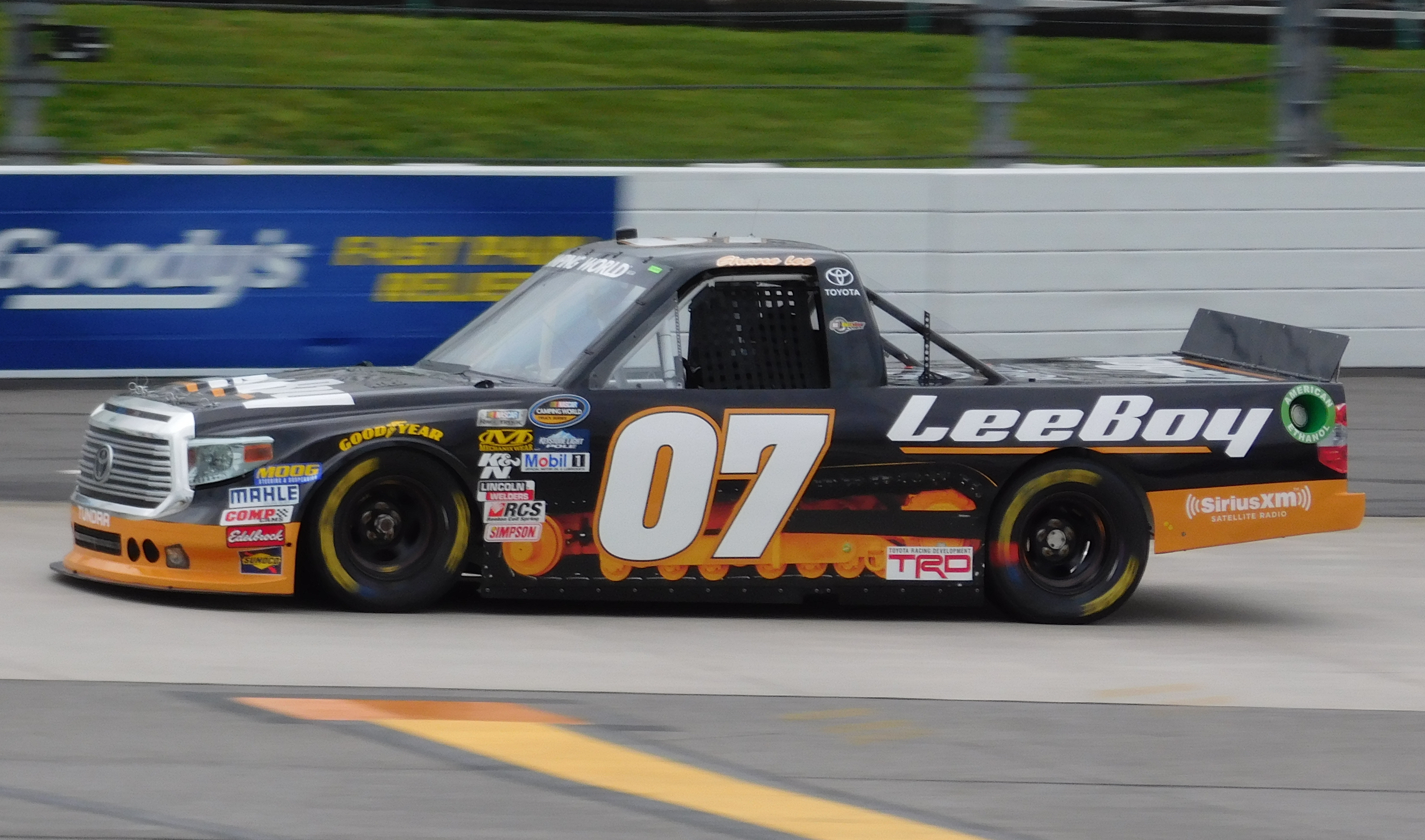
Shane Lee drove the No. 07 for SS-Green Light Racing in a partnership with Win-Tron in 2016.

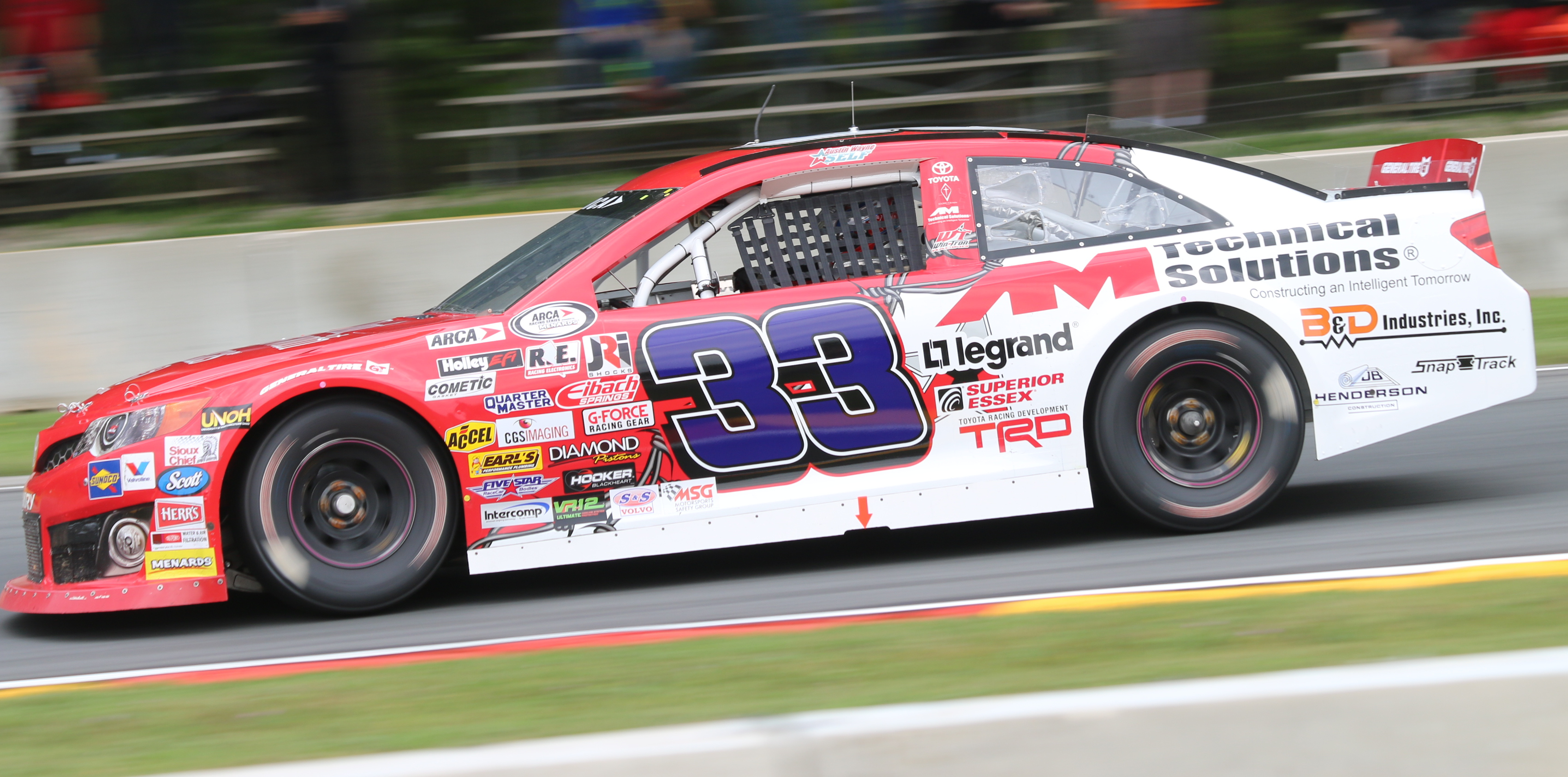
Austin Wayne Self drove Win-Tron's No. 33 ARCA car at Road America in 2017.

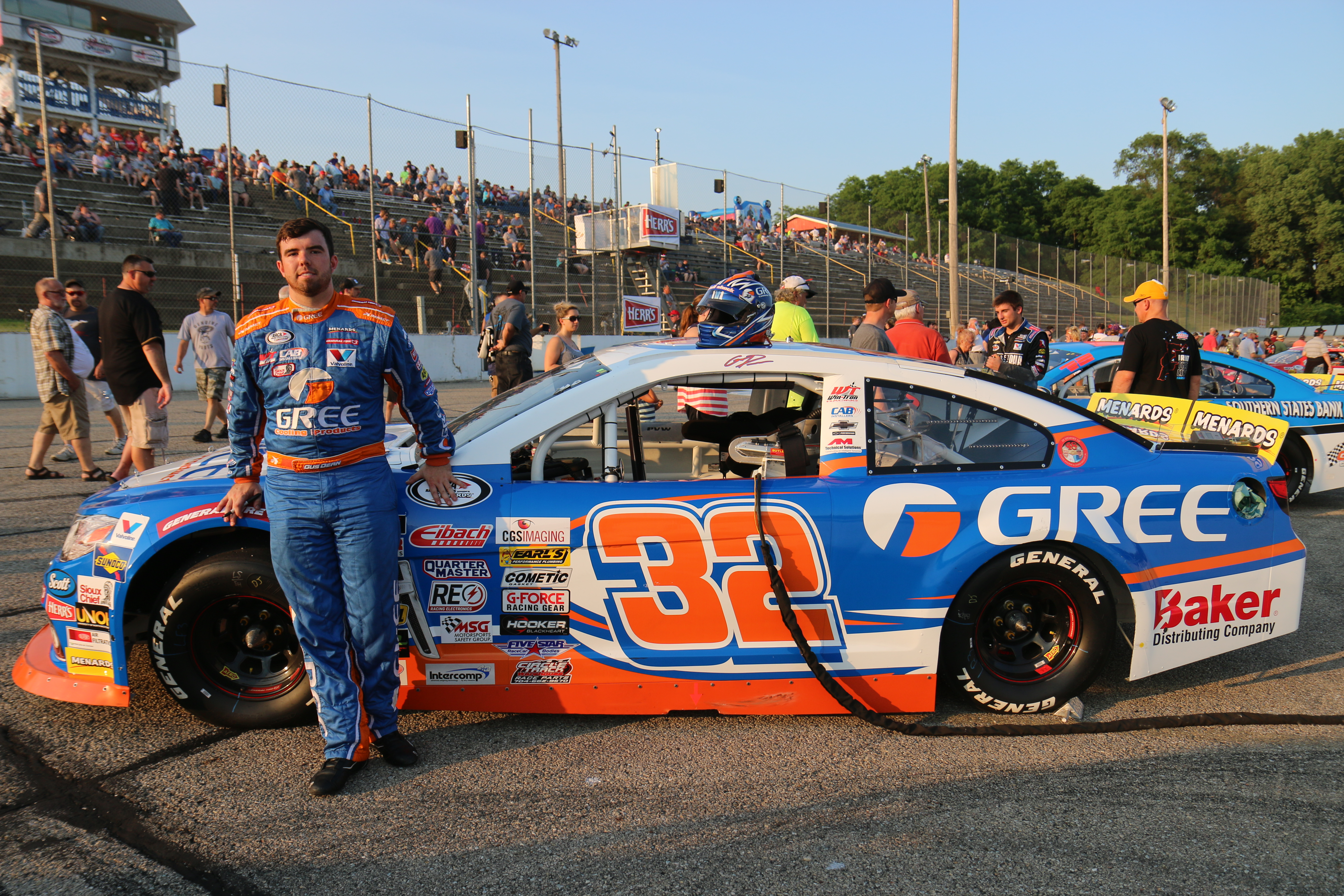
Gus Dean stands beside his No. 32 ARCA car for Win-Tron in before the race at Madison in 2018.

The team, then known as Country Joe Racing, was founded in 2007 by Kevin Cywinski and Nate Thiesse. Originally, the team ran in the American Speed Association, owned by Lakeville, Minnesota businessman Joe Miller, with Cywinski as their driver. Along the way, they would also enter the ARCA RE/MAX Series in 2004. Through a partnership with Chip Ganassi Racing, the team ran development driver Ryan Hemphill. Hemphill would take six wins in his rookie season but finished second to Frank Kimmel. After Hemphill graduated to the Busch Series, the team fielded Miller's son Joey Miller. The team ran a limited schedule in 2004, but scored a win in their first start at Nashville Superspeedway. Making the full-time move in 2005, Miller would rack up an impressive five wins as well as that years ARCA Rookie of the Year title. However, he was runner-up to Frank Kimmel for the championship.

After Miller moved up to the Truck Series for 2006, CJR hired another ASA driver, Blake Bjorklund. Although Bjorklund missed the races at Daytona and Nashville, he rallied with two poles and his first win at Salem Speedway. Bjorklund would move to the Truck Series for the 2007 season. After the 2007 season, Miller would sell the team's assets to Cywinski and Nate Thiesse.

In 2014, the team signed ten-time ARCA champion Frank Kimmel to drive the team's No. 44 in the ARCA Racing Series, and added a full-time Camping World Truck Series team with rookie driver Mason Mingus in the No. 35.

In 2020, the team was to field their own truck by themselves for the first time since 2015, with the No. 32 Chevrolet Silverado being driven by Howie DiSavino III at Richmond, but those plans were cancelled after the COVID-19 pandemic and the rescheduling of the race from May to September. DiSavino did, however, continue to drive the No. 32 Chevrolet in the ARCA Menards Series as he did in 2019. Gus Dean also drove the car in multiple races in 2019 and 2020. In a partnership with Hill Motorsports, they also fielded Dean at the Truck Series races at Daytona and Talladega in Hill's No. 56 truck.

Following Win-Tron Racing's merger into AM Racing for the 2021 season, DiSavino III continued to drive the No. 32 part-time in 2021. He made his first start at Daytona that year. Later on Austin Wayne Self would make his first start at The Glen.
