= Sprecher 150 =

ARCA race at the Milwaukee Mile

ARCA Menards Series/ARCA Menards Series East
- Venue: Milwaukee Mile
- Location: West Allis, Wisconsin
- Corporate sponsor: Sprecher Brewery
- First race: 1982
- Last race: 2024
- Distance: 150 mi (240 km)
- Laps: 150
- Previous names: Milwaukee Sentinel 200 (1982–1983); ARCA Re/Max 150 (2005); Governor's Cup 200 (2006–2007)
- Most wins (driver): Frank Kimmel; William Sawalich (2)
- Most wins (team): Clement Racing; Joe Gibbs Racing (2)
- Most wins (manufacturer): Toyota (4)

Circuit information
- Length: 1 mi (1.6 km)
- Turns: 4

The Sprecher 150 was a 150-mile (240 km) annual ARCA Menards Series/ARCA Menards Series East combination race held at the Milwaukee Mile in West Allis, Wisconsin. The event returned to the ARCA schedule in 2021 for the first time since 2007. It was originally held from 1982 and 1983 before being brought back from 2005 through 2007. The ARCA Menards Series East, formerly the NASCAR K&N Pro Series East, joined the ARCA Menards Series in this race starting in 2021 and it became one of three combination races for the two series, the others being Iowa and Bristol. It was once again removed from the schedule following the 2024 ARCA Menards Series.

== History ==
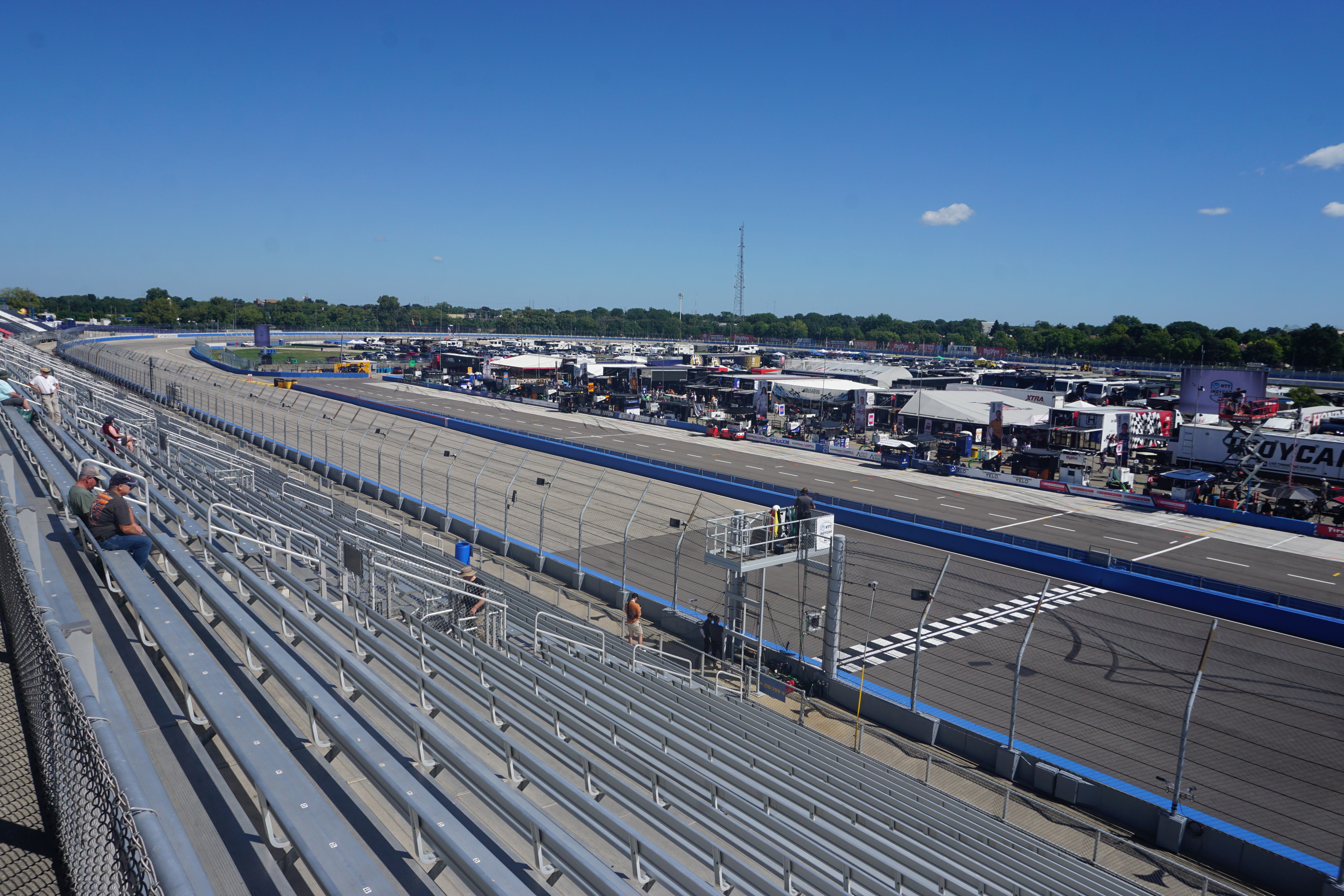
Turn 4 at the Milwaukee Mile

ARCA first raced at the Milwaukee Mile in 1958 with races co-sanctioned with USAC.

ARCA brought the Milwaukee Mile back to its schedule on June 4, 2005. It was the eighth event that ARCA either sanctioned or co-sanctioned at the track. David Ragan qualified on the pole position. Frank Kimmel led 89 of 150 laps to take the win. Joey Miller finished second, Chad Blount finished third, Erik Darnell fourth, and Bobby Gerhart ended up finishing fifth.

Phil Bozell won the 2006 Governor's Cup 200 in his fourth start of the season. It was his first and only ARCA victory. The Michigan driver qualified second quickest and Blake Bjorklund sat on the pole position. Tim Schendel finished second, Frank Kimmel third, Justin Allgaier fourth, and Ryan Mathews fifth.

Frank Kimmel won the 2007 Governor's Cup 200 on a Sunday afternoon race. The clutch in his car failed early in the race and his team had to push the car to get it moving after each pit stop. This caused him to start deep in the field after each stop. It was Kimmel's 71st ARCA victory. Rookie Justin Marks had his then-best second place finished after leading 59 laps. Michael McDowell led 43 laps and finished fourth after a pit stop with 13 laps remaining. 2006 race winner Phil Bozell led 28 laps and he was battling Marks for the lead late in the race but ran out of fuel with 10 laps remaining. Rookie James Buescher led 30 laps before an accident took him out on lap 134 and Ken Butler III led 24 laps before his rear end failed. The race featured eight leaders and ten lead changes. It had nine caution periods for 45 laps.

ARCA brought the Milwaukee Mile back to its schedule on December 1, 2020.

In the 2023 race, William Sawalich lead 141 laps and in 2024, Sawalich lead 149 laps and won both races.

== Past winners ==
Year	Date	No.	Driver	Team	Manufacturer	Race Distance		Race Time	Average speed (mph)
Year	Date	No.	Driver	Team	Manufacturer	Laps	Miles	Race Time	Average speed (mph)
ARCA Menards Series race
1982	August 29	99	Dean Roper	Mueller Brothers Racing	Pontiac	171*	171* (275)	1:57:58	86.973
1983	August 28	83	Dave Weltmeyer	Goudie Racing	Pontiac (2)	200	200 (320)	2:25:56	82.223
1984 – 2004	Not held								
2005	June 4	46	Frank Kimmel	Clement Racing	Ford	150	150 (240)	2:00:48	74.503
2006	August 27	9	Phil Bozell	Hagans Racing	Chevrolet	200	200 (320)	2:10:27	91.989
2007	August 26	46	Frank Kimmel (2)	Clement Racing (2)	Ford (2)	200	200 (320)	2:17:17	87.410
2008 – 2020	Not held								
ARCA Menards Series/ARCA Menards Series East combination race
2021	August 29	18	Ty Gibbs	Joe Gibbs Racing	Toyota	150	150 (240)	1:29:27	100.615
2022	August 28	18	Sammy Smith	Kyle Busch Motorsports	Toyota (2)	150	150 (240)	1:45:05	85.646
2023	August 27	18	William Sawalich	Joe Gibbs Racing	Toyota (3)	150	150 (240)	1:37:51	91.978
2024	August 25	18	William Sawalich (2)	Joe Gibbs Racing	Toyota (4)	150	150 (240)	1:30:04	99.926

- 1982: Race shortened to 171 laps due to rain.
