= 2001 NAPA 500 =

35th race of the 2001 NASCAR Winston Cup Series

Race details
- Race 35 of 36 in the 2001 NASCAR Winston Cup Series
- The 2001 NAPA 500 program cover, with artwork by Sam Bass.
- Date: November 18, 2001
- Official name: 42nd Annual NAPA 500
- Location: Hampton, Georgia, Atlanta Motor Speedway
- Course: Permanent racing facility
- Course length: 1.54 miles (2.48 km)
- Distance: 325 laps, 500.5 mi (805.476 km)
- Average speed: 151.756 miles per hour (244.228 km/h)

Pole position
Driver	Dale Earnhardt Jr.	Dale Earnhardt, Inc.
- Time: 28.868

Most laps led
Driver	Dale Earnhardt Jr.	Dale Earnhardt, Inc.
- Laps: 171

Winner
No. 18	Bobby Labonte	Joe Gibbs Racing

Television in the United States
- Network: NBC
- Announcers: Allen Bestwick, Benny Parsons, Wally Dallenbach Jr.

Radio in the United States
- Radio: Performance Racing Network

The 2001 NAPA 500 was the 35th stock car race of the 2001 NASCAR Winston Cup Series and the 42nd iteration of the event. The race was held on Sunday, November 18, 2001, in Hampton, Georgia at Atlanta Motor Speedway, a 1.54 miles (2.48 km) permanent asphalt quad-oval intermediate speedway. The race took the scheduled 325 laps to complete. On the final lap of the race, Jerry Nadeau, driving for Hendrick Motorsports, would run out of fuel heading into turn 3, leading to Joe Gibbs Racing driver Bobby Labonte stealing the victory away from Nadeau. The win was Labonte's 18th career NASCAR Winston Cup Series victory and his second and final victory of the season. To fill out the podium, Sterling Marlin, driving for Chip Ganassi Racing with Felix Sabates, and Kevin Harvick, driving for Richard Childress Racing, would finish second and third, respectively.

Meanwhile, sixth-place finisher, Hendrick Motorsports driver Jeff Gordon, would clinch the 2001 NASCAR Winston Cup Series championship after a dominant 2001 season, earning his fourth and final NASCAR Winston Cup Series championship.

== Background ==
Atlanta Motor Speedway (formerly Atlanta International Raceway) is a track in Hampton, Georgia, 20 miles (32 km) south of Atlanta. It is a 1.54-mile (2.48 km) quad-oval track with a seating capacity of 111,000. It opened in 1960 as a 1.5-mile (2.4 km) standard oval. In 1994, 46 condominiums were built over the northeastern side of the track. In 1997, to standardize the track with Speedway Motorsports' other two 1.5-mile (2.4 km) ovals, the entire track was almost completely rebuilt. The frontstretch and backstretch were swapped, and the configuration of the track was changed from oval to quad-oval. The project made the track one of the fastest on the NASCAR circuit.

=== Entry list ===
- (R) denotes rookie driver.

#	Driver	Team	Make
1	Kenny Wallace	Dale Earnhardt, Inc.	Chevrolet
01	Jason Leffler (R)	Chip Ganassi Racing with Felix Sabates	Dodge
2	Rusty Wallace	Penske Racing South	Ford
4	Bobby Hamilton Jr.	Morgan–McClure Motorsports	Chevrolet
5	Terry Labonte	Hendrick Motorsports	Chevrolet
6	Mark Martin	Roush Racing	Ford
7	Kevin Lepage	Ultra Motorsports	Ford
8	Dale Earnhardt Jr.	Dale Earnhardt, Inc.	Chevrolet
9	Bill Elliott	Evernham Motorsports	Dodge
10	Johnny Benson Jr.	MBV Motorsports	Pontiac
11	Brett Bodine	Brett Bodine Racing	Ford
12	Mike Wallace	Penske Racing South	Ford
13	Hermie Sadler	SCORE Motorsports	Chevrolet
14	Ron Hornaday Jr. (R)	A. J. Foyt Enterprises	Pontiac
15	Michael Waltrip	Dale Earnhardt, Inc.	Chevrolet
17	Matt Kenseth	Roush Racing	Ford
18	Bobby Labonte	Joe Gibbs Racing	Pontiac
19	Casey Atwood (R)	Evernham Motorsports	Dodge
20	Tony Stewart	Joe Gibbs Racing	Pontiac
21	Elliott Sadler	Wood Brothers Racing	Ford
22	Ward Burton	Bill Davis Racing	Dodge
23	Hut Stricklin	Bill Davis Racing	Dodge
24	Jeff Gordon	Hendrick Motorsports	Chevrolet
25	Jerry Nadeau	Hendrick Motorsports	Chevrolet
26	Jimmy Spencer	Haas-Carter Motorsports	Ford
28	Ricky Rudd	Robert Yates Racing	Ford
29	Kevin Harvick (R)	Richard Childress Racing	Chevrolet
30	Jeff Green	Richard Childress Racing	Chevrolet
31	Robby Gordon	Richard Childress Racing	Chevrolet
32	Ricky Craven	PPI Motorsports	Ford
33	Joe Nemechek	Andy Petree Racing	Chevrolet
36	Ken Schrader	MBV Motorsports	Pontiac
40	Sterling Marlin	Chip Ganassi Racing with Felix Sabates	Dodge
41	Mark Green	A. J. Foyt Enterprises	Pontiac
43	John Andretti	Petty Enterprises	Dodge
44	Buckshot Jones	Petty Enterprises	Dodge
45	Kyle Petty	Petty Enterprises	Dodge
46	Frank Kimmel	Larry Clement Racing	Ford
47	Lance Hooper	Dark Horse Motorsports	Chevrolet
48	Jimmie Johnson	Hendrick Motorsports	Chevrolet
55	Bobby Hamilton	Andy Petree Racing	Chevrolet
66	Todd Bodine	Haas-Carter Motorsports	Ford
71	Dave Marcis	Marcis Auto Racing	Chevrolet
77	Robert Pressley	Jasper Motorsports	Ford
85	Carl Long	Mansion Motorsports	Ford
88	Dale Jarrett	Robert Yates Racing	Ford
90	Rick Mast	Donlavey Racing	Ford
92	Stacy Compton	Melling Racing	Dodge
93	Dave Blaney	Bill Davis Racing	Dodge
97	Kurt Busch (R)	Roush Racing	Ford
99	Jeff Burton	Roush Racing	Ford
Official entry list

== Practice ==
=== First practice ===
The first practice session was held on Friday, November 16, at 11:20 a.m. EST. The session would last for two hours. Dale Earnhardt Jr., driving for Dale Earnhardt, Inc., would set the fastest time in the session, with a lap of 29.275 and an average speed of 189.377 miles per hour (304.773 km/h).

Pos.	#	Driver	Team	Make	Time	Speed
1	8	Dale Earnhardt Jr.	Dale Earnhardt, Inc.	Chevrolet	29.275	189.377
2	22	Ward Burton	Bill Davis Racing	Dodge	29.276	189.370
3	23	Hut Stricklin	Bill Davis Racing	Dodge	29.332	189.009
Full first practice results

=== Second practice ===
The second practice session was held on Saturday, November 17, at 10:00 a.m. EST. The session would last for 45 minutes. Tony Stewart, driving for Joe Gibbs Racing, would set the fastest time in the session, with a lap of 30.125 and an average speed of 184.033 miles per hour (296.172 km/h).

Pos.	#	Driver	Team	Make	Time	Speed
1	20	Tony Stewart	Joe Gibbs Racing	Pontiac	30.125	184.033
2	26	Jimmy Spencer	Haas-Carter Motorsports	Ford	30.180	183.698
3	18	Bobby Labonte	Joe Gibbs Racing	Pontiac	30.196	183.600
Full second practice results

=== Third and final practice ===
The final practice session, sometimes referred to as Happy Hour, was held on Saturday, November 17, at 11:15 a.m. EST. The session would last for 45 minutes. Tony Stewart, driving for Joe Gibbs Racing, would set the fastest time in the session, with a lap of 30.373 and an average speed of 182.531 miles per hour (293.755 km/h).

Pos.	#	Driver	Team	Make	Time	Speed
1	20	Tony Stewart	Joe Gibbs Racing	Pontiac	30.373	182.531
2	93	Dave Blaney	Bill Davis Racing	Dodge	30.468	181.961
3	40	Sterling Marlin	Chip Ganassi Racing with Felix Sabates	Dodge	30.472	181.938
Full Happy Hour practice results

== Qualifying ==
Qualifying was held on Friday, November 16, at 3:00 p.m. EST. Each driver would have two laps to set a fastest time; the fastest of the two would count as their official qualifying lap. Positions 1-36 would be decided on time, while positions 37-43 would be based on provisionals. Six spots are awarded by the use of provisionals based on owner's points. The seventh is awarded to a past champion who has not otherwise qualified for the race. If no past champ needs the provisional, the next team in the owner points will be awarded a provisional.

Dale Earnhardt Jr., driving for Dale Earnhardt, Inc., would win the pole, setting a time of 28.868 and an average speed of 192.047 miles per hour (309.070 km/h).

Eight drivers would fail to qualify: Mark Green, Robby Gordon, Jason Leffler, Kurt Busch, Rick Mast, Ron Hornaday Jr., Dave Marcis, and Frank Kimmel.

=== Full qualifying results ===
Pos.	#	Driver	Team	Make	Time	Speed
1	8	Dale Earnhardt Jr.	Dale Earnhardt, Inc.	Chevrolet	28.868	192.047
2	6	Mark Martin	Roush Racing	Ford	29.108	190.463
3	93	Dave Blaney	Bill Davis Racing	Dodge	29.195	189.896
4	22	Ward Burton	Bill Davis Racing	Dodge	29.211	189.792
5	15	Michael Waltrip	Dale Earnhardt, Inc.	Chevrolet	29.222	189.720
6	9	Bill Elliott	Evernham Motorsports	Dodge	29.231	189.662
7	7	Kevin Lepage	Ultra Motorsports	Ford	29.282	189.331
8	10	Johnny Benson Jr.	MBV Motorsports	Pontiac	29.298	189.228
9	92	Stacy Compton	Melling Racing	Dodge	29.298	189.228
10	33	Joe Nemechek	Andy Petree Racing	Chevrolet	29.300	189.215
11	23	Hut Stricklin	Bill Davis Racing	Dodge	29.301	189.209
12	20	Tony Stewart	Joe Gibbs Racing	Pontiac	29.305	189.183
13	32	Ricky Craven	PPI Motorsports	Ford	29.368	188.777
14	66	Todd Bodine	Haas-Carter Motorsports	Ford	29.382	188.687
15	21	Elliott Sadler	Wood Brothers Racing	Ford	29.416	188.469
16	1	Kenny Wallace	Dale Earnhardt, Inc.	Chevrolet	29.425	188.411
17	30	Jeff Green	Richard Childress Racing	Chevrolet	29.477	188.079
18	11	Brett Bodine	Brett Bodine Racing	Ford	29.487	188.015
19	55	Bobby Hamilton	Andy Petree Racing	Chevrolet	29.496	187.958
20	44	Buckshot Jones	Petty Enterprises	Dodge	29.501	187.926
21	48	Jimmie Johnson	Hendrick Motorsports	Chevrolet	29.502	187.919
22	19	Casey Atwood (R)	Evernham Motorsports	Dodge	29.514	187.843
23	17	Matt Kenseth	Roush Racing	Ford	29.521	187.799
24	24	Jeff Gordon	Hendrick Motorsports	Chevrolet	29.538	187.690
25	13	Hermie Sadler	SCORE Motorsports	Chevrolet	29.538	187.690
26	85	Carl Long	Mansion Motorsports	Dodge	29.542	187.665
27	2	Rusty Wallace	Penske Racing South	Ford	29.551	187.608
28	40	Sterling Marlin	Chip Ganassi Racing with Felix Sabates	Dodge	29.556	187.576
29	4	Bobby Hamilton Jr.	Morgan–McClure Motorsports	Chevrolet	29.558	187.563
30	26	Jimmy Spencer	Haas-Carter Motorsports	Ford	29.590	187.361
31	12	Mike Wallace	Penske Racing South	Ford	29.601	187.291
32	45	Kyle Petty	Petty Enterprises	Dodge	29.602	187.285
33	88	Dale Jarrett	Robert Yates Racing	Ford	29.608	187.247
34	99	Jeff Burton	Roush Racing	Ford	29.609	187.240
35	43	John Andretti	Petty Enterprises	Dodge	29.620	187.171
36	47	Lance Hooper	Dark Horse Motorsports	Chevrolet	29.620	187.171
Provisionals
37	28	Ricky Rudd	Robert Yates Racing	Ford	29.964	185.022
38	29	Kevin Harvick (R)	Richard Childress Racing	Chevrolet	29.628	187.120
39	18	Bobby Labonte	Joe Gibbs Racing	Pontiac	29.628	187.120
40	36	Ken Schrader	MB2 Motorsports	Pontiac	29.702	186.654
41	25	Jerry Nadeau	Hendrick Motorsports	Chevrolet	29.634	187.082
42	77	Robert Pressley	Jasper Motorsports	Ford	29.648	186.994
43	5	Terry Labonte	Hendrick Motorsports	Chevrolet	30.093	184.229
Failed to qualify
44	41	Mark Green	A. J. Foyt Enterprises	Pontiac	29.630	187.108
45	31	Robby Gordon	Richard Childress Racing	Chevrolet	29.642	187.032
46	01	Jason Leffler (R)	Chip Ganassi Racing with Felix Sabates	Dodge	29.722	186.528
47	97	Kurt Busch (R)	Roush Racing	Ford	29.734	186.453
48	90	Rick Mast	Donlavey Racing	Ford	29.766	186.253
49	14	Ron Hornaday Jr. (R)	A. J. Foyt Enterprises	Pontiac	29.870	185.604
50	71	Dave Marcis	Marcis Auto Racing	Chevrolet	30.015	184.708
51	46	Frank Kimmel	Larry Clement Racing	Ford	30.015	184.708
Official qualifying results

== Race results ==
Fin	St	#	Driver	Team	Make	Laps	Led	Status	Pts	Winnings
1	39	18	Bobby Labonte	Joe Gibbs Racing	Pontiac	325	13	running	180	$233,227
2	28	40	Sterling Marlin	Chip Ganassi Racing with Felix Sabates	Dodge	325	2	running	175	$142,460
3	38	29	Kevin Harvick (R)	Richard Childress Racing	Chevrolet	325	0	running	165	$135,477
4	41	25	Jerry Nadeau	Hendrick Motorsports	Chevrolet	325	41	running	165	$110,100
5	4	22	Ward Burton	Bill Davis Racing	Dodge	325	0	running	155	$113,435
6	24	24	Jeff Gordon	Hendrick Motorsports	Chevrolet	325	31	running	155	$113,352
7	1	8	Dale Earnhardt Jr.	Dale Earnhardt, Inc.	Chevrolet	325	171	running	156	$122,123
8	33	88	Dale Jarrett	Robert Yates Racing	Ford	325	0	running	142	$103,702
9	12	20	Tony Stewart	Joe Gibbs Racing	Pontiac	325	33	running	143	$78,650
10	34	99	Jeff Burton	Roush Racing	Ford	325	3	running	139	$105,821
11	11	23	Hut Stricklin	Bill Davis Racing	Dodge	325	0	running	130	$54,950
12	27	2	Rusty Wallace	Penske Racing South	Ford	325	0	running	127	$98,390
13	31	12	Mike Wallace	Penske Racing South	Ford	325	1	running	129	$86,634
14	6	9	Bill Elliott	Evernham Motorsports	Dodge	325	0	running	121	$81,448
15	29	4	Bobby Hamilton Jr.	Morgan–McClure Motorsports	Chevrolet	325	0	running	118	$66,945
16	14	66	Todd Bodine	Haas-Carter Motorsports	Ford	325	2	running	120	$62,736
17	23	17	Matt Kenseth	Roush Racing	Ford	325	0	running	112	$63,275
18	9	92	Stacy Compton	Melling Racing	Dodge	325	0	running	109	$59,265
19	7	7	Kevin Lepage	Ultra Motorsports	Ford	325	3	running	111	$65,675
20	22	19	Casey Atwood (R)	Evernham Motorsports	Dodge	324	0	running	103	$57,775
21	42	77	Robert Pressley	Jasper Motorsports	Ford	324	0	running	100	$61,550
22	2	6	Mark Martin	Roush Racing	Ford	324	0	running	97	$69,225
23	8	10	Johnny Benson Jr.	MBV Motorsports	Pontiac	324	0	running	94	$60,900
24	15	21	Elliott Sadler	Wood Brothers Racing	Ford	323	0	running	91	$70,575
25	35	43	John Andretti	Petty Enterprises	Dodge	323	0	running	88	$88,177
26	5	15	Michael Waltrip	Dale Earnhardt, Inc.	Chevrolet	323	0	running	85	$58,925
27	19	55	Bobby Hamilton	Andy Petree Racing	Chevrolet	323	0	running	82	$59,900
28	16	1	Kenny Wallace	Dale Earnhardt, Inc.	Chevrolet	323	0	running	79	$77,918
29	21	48	Jimmie Johnson	Hendrick Motorsports	Chevrolet	322	0	running	76	$48,600
30	32	45	Kyle Petty	Petty Enterprises	Dodge	322	1	running	78	$49,125
31	40	36	Ken Schrader	MB2 Motorsports	Pontiac	322	0	running	70	$59,450
32	43	5	Terry Labonte	Hendrick Motorsports	Chevrolet	321	0	running	67	$83,575
33	20	44	Buckshot Jones	Petty Enterprises	Dodge	319	0	running	64	$56,250
34	17	30	Jeff Green	Richard Childress Racing	Chevrolet	319	0	running	61	$48,175
35	37	28	Ricky Rudd	Robert Yates Racing	Ford	319	0	running	58	$78,397
36	18	11	Brett Bodine	Brett Bodine Racing	Ford	316	0	running	55	$48,025
37	25	13	Hermie Sadler	SCORE Motorsports	Chevrolet	316	0	running	52	$47,975
38	13	32	Ricky Craven	PPI Motorsports	Ford	268	8	transmission	54	$48,725
39	10	33	Joe Nemechek	Andy Petree Racing	Chevrolet	266	0	vibration	46	$76,145
40	30	26	Jimmy Spencer	Haas-Carter Motorsports	Ford	260	0	vibration	43	$55,800
41	3	93	Dave Blaney	Bill Davis Racing	Dodge	181	16	handling	45	$49,850
42	36	47	Lance Hooper	Dark Horse Motorsports	Chevrolet	104	0	engine	37	$47,700
43	26	85	Carl Long	Mansion Motorsports	Dodge	15	0	crash	34	$47,904
Failed to qualify
44		41	Mark Green	A. J. Foyt Enterprises	Pontiac					
45		31	Robby Gordon	Richard Childress Racing	Chevrolet					
46		01	Jason Leffler (R)	Chip Ganassi Racing with Felix Sabates	Dodge					
47		97	Kurt Busch (R)	Roush Racing	Ford					
48		90	Rick Mast	Donlavey Racing	Ford					
49		14	Ron Hornaday Jr. (R)	A. J. Foyt Enterprises	Pontiac					
50		71	Dave Marcis	Marcis Auto Racing	Chevrolet					
51		46	Frank Kimmel	Larry Clement Racing	Ford					
Official race results

Previous race: 2001 Pennzoil Freedom 400	NASCAR Winston Cup Series; 2001 season	Next race: 2001 New Hampshire 300
