= 2001 Old Dominion 500 =

30th race of the 2001 NASCAR Winston Cup Series

Race details
- Race 30 of 36 in the 2001 NASCAR Winston Cup Series
- The 2001 Old Dominion 500 program cover.
- Date: October 15, 2001
- Official name: 53rd Annual Old Dominion 500
- Location: Martinsville, Virginia, Martinsville Speedway
- Course: Permanent racing facility
- Course length: 0.526 miles (0.847 km)
- Distance: 500 laps, 263 mi (423.257 km)
- Average speed: 75.75 miles per hour (121.91 km/h)

Pole position
Driver	Todd Bodine	Haas-Carter Motorsports
- Time: 20.204

Most laps led
Driver	Ricky Craven	PPI Motorsports
- Laps: 94

Winner
No. 32	Ricky Craven	PPI Motorsports

Television in the United States
- Network: NBC
- Announcers: Allen Bestwick, Benny Parsons, Wally Dallenbach Jr.

Radio in the United States
- Radio: Motor Racing Network

The 2001 Old Dominion 500 was the 30th stock car race of the 2001 NASCAR Winston Cup Series and the 53rd iteration of the event. The race was held on Monday, October 15, 2001, Martinsville, Virginia at Martinsville Speedway, a 0.526 miles (0.847 km) permanent oval-shaped short track. The race took the scheduled 500 laps to complete. In the closing laps of the race, Ricky Craven, driving for PPI Motorsports, would manage to defend Robert Yates Racing driver Dale Jarrett in a close finish to win his first career NASCAR Winston Cup Series victory and his only victory of the season. To fill out the podium, Jarrett and Bill Davis Racing driver Ward Burton would finish second and third, respectively.

== Background ==
The layout of Martinsville Speedway, the venue where the race was held.

Martinsville Speedway is a NASCAR-owned stock car racing track located in Henry County, in Ridgeway, Virginia, just to the south of Martinsville. At 0.526 miles (0.847 km) in length, it is the shortest track in the NASCAR Cup Series. The track was also one of the first paved oval tracks in NASCAR, being built in 1947 by H. Clay Earles. It is also the only remaining race track that has been on the NASCAR circuit from its beginning in 1948.

=== Entry list ===
- (R) denotes rookie driver.

#	Driver	Team	Make
1	Kenny Wallace	Dale Earnhardt, Inc.	Chevrolet
01	Jason Leffler (R)	Chip Ganassi Racing with Felix Sabates	Dodge
2	Rusty Wallace	Penske Racing South	Ford
4	Rich Bickle	Morgan–McClure Motorsports	Chevrolet
5	Terry Labonte	Hendrick Motorsports	Chevrolet
6	Mark Martin	Roush Racing	Ford
7	Kevin Lepage	Ultra Motorsports	Ford
8	Dale Earnhardt Jr.	Dale Earnhardt, Inc.	Chevrolet
9	Bill Elliott	Evernham Motorsports	Dodge
10	Johnny Benson Jr.	MBV Motorsports	Pontiac
11	Brett Bodine	Brett Bodine Racing	Ford
12	Mike Wallace	Penske Racing South	Ford
13	Hermie Sadler	SCORE Motorsports	Chevrolet
14	Ron Hornaday Jr. (R)	A. J. Foyt Enterprises	Pontiac
15	Michael Waltrip	Dale Earnhardt, Inc.	Chevrolet
17	Matt Kenseth	Roush Racing	Ford
18	Bobby Labonte	Joe Gibbs Racing	Pontiac
19	Casey Atwood (R)	Evernham Motorsports	Dodge
20	Tony Stewart	Joe Gibbs Racing	Pontiac
21	Elliott Sadler	Wood Brothers Racing	Ford
22	Ward Burton	Bill Davis Racing	Dodge
24	Jeff Gordon	Hendrick Motorsports	Chevrolet
25	Jerry Nadeau	Hendrick Motorsports	Chevrolet
26	Jimmy Spencer	Haas-Carter Motorsports	Ford
28	Ricky Rudd	Robert Yates Racing	Ford
29	Kevin Harvick (R)	Richard Childress Racing	Chevrolet
31	Robby Gordon	Richard Childress Racing	Chevrolet
32	Ricky Craven	PPI Motorsports	Ford
33	Joe Nemechek	Andy Petree Racing	Chevrolet
36	Ken Schrader	MBV Motorsports	Pontiac
40	Sterling Marlin	Chip Ganassi Racing with Felix Sabates	Dodge
43	John Andretti	Petty Enterprises	Dodge
44	Buckshot Jones	Petty Enterprises	Dodge
45	Kyle Petty	Petty Enterprises	Dodge
46	Frank Kimmel	Larry Clement Racing	Ford
55	Bobby Hamilton	Andy Petree Racing	Chevrolet
66	Todd Bodine	Haas-Carter Motorsports	Ford
71	Dave Marcis	Marcis Auto Racing	Chevrolet
77	Robert Pressley	Jasper Motorsports	Ford
85	Carl Long	Mansion Motorsports	Ford
88	Dale Jarrett	Robert Yates Racing	Ford
90	Hut Stricklin	Donlavey Racing	Ford
92	Stacy Compton	Melling Racing	Dodge
93	Dave Blaney	Bill Davis Racing	Dodge
97	Kurt Busch (R)	Roush Racing	Ford
99	Jeff Burton	Roush Racing	Ford
Official entry list

== Practice ==
=== First practice ===
The first practice session was held on Friday, October 12, at 11:20 AM EST. The session would last for two hours. Tony Stewart, driving for Joe Gibbs Racing, would set the fastest time in the session, with a lap of 20.188 and an average speed of 93.798 miles per hour (150.953 km/h).

Pos.	#	Driver	Team	Make	Time	Speed
1	20	Tony Stewart	Joe Gibbs Racing	Pontiac	20.188	93.798
2	55	Bobby Hamilton	Andy Petree Racing	Chevrolet	20.206	93.715
3	10	Johnny Benson Jr.	MBV Motorsports	Pontiac	20.240	93.557
Full first practice results

=== Second practice ===
The second practice session was held on Saturday, October 13, at 12:00 PM EST. The session would last for 45 minutes. Mike Wallace, driving for Penske Racing South, would set the fastest time in the session, with a lap of 20.443 and an average speed of 92.628 miles per hour (149.070 km/h).

Pos.	#	Driver	Team	Make	Time	Speed
1	12	Mike Wallace	Penske Racing South	Ford	20.443	92.628
2	88	Dale Jarrett	Robert Yates Racing	Ford	20.563	92.088
3	10	Johnny Benson Jr.	MBV Motorsports	Pontiac	20.589	91.971
Full second practice results

=== Third and final practice ===
The final practice session, sometimes referred to as Happy Hour, was held on Saturday, October 13, at 1:15 PM EST. The session would last for 45 minutes. Mike Wallace, driving for Penske Racing South, would set the fastest time in the session, with a lap of 20.451 and an average speed of 92.592 miles per hour (149.012 km/h).

During the session, Roush Racing driver Jeff Burton would wreck after Ricky Rudd sent oil onto the track, sending Burton into the outside turn 1 wall. Burton was forced to start at the rear for the race and transfer to a backup car.

Pos.	#	Driver	Team	Make	Time	Speed
1	12	Mike Wallace	Penske Racing South	Ford	20.451	92.592
2	20	Tony Stewart	Joe Gibbs Racing	Pontiac	20.487	92.429
3	31	Robby Gordon	Richard Childress Racing	Chevrolet	20.518	92.290
Full Happy Hour practice results

== Qualifying ==
Qualifying was held on Friday, October 12, at 3:05 PM EST. Each driver would have two laps to set a fastest time; the fastest of the two would count as their official qualifying lap. Positions 1-36 would be decided on time, while positions 37-43 would be based on provisionals. Six spots are awarded by the use of provisionals based on owner's points. The seventh is awarded to a past champion who has not otherwise qualified for the race. If no past champ needs the provisional, the next team in the owner points will be awarded a provisional.

Todd Bodine, driving for Haas-Carter Motorsports, would win the pole, setting a time of 20.204 and an average speed of 93.724 miles per hour (150.834 km/h).

Three drivers would fail to qualify: Carl Long, Kyle Petty, and Frank Kimmel.

=== Full qualifying results ===
Pos.	#	Driver	Team	Make	Time	Speed
1	66	Todd Bodine	Haas-Carter Motorsports	Ford	20.204	93.724
2	8	Dale Earnhardt Jr.	Dale Earnhardt, Inc.	Chevrolet	20.227	93.617
3	24	Jeff Gordon	Hendrick Motorsports	Chevrolet	20.255	93.488
4	88	Dale Jarrett	Robert Yates Racing	Ford	20.291	93.322
5	10	Johnny Benson Jr.	MBV Motorsports	Pontiac	20.298	93.290
6	32	Ricky Craven	PPI Motorsports	Ford	20.299	93.285
7	33	Joe Nemechek	Andy Petree Racing	Chevrolet	20.302	93.272
8	20	Tony Stewart	Joe Gibbs Racing	Pontiac	20.303	93.267
9	2	Rusty Wallace	Penske Racing South	Ford	20.334	93.125
10	93	Dave Blaney	Bill Davis Racing	Dodge	20.357	93.020
11	22	Ward Burton	Bill Davis Racing	Dodge	20.370	92.960
12	12	Mike Wallace	Penske Racing South	Ford	20.370	92.960
13	6	Mark Martin	Roush Racing	Ford	20.377	92.928
14	25	Jerry Nadeau	Hendrick Motorsports	Chevrolet	20.404	92.805
15	77	Robert Pressley	Jasper Motorsports	Ford	20.417	92.746
16	55	Bobby Hamilton	Andy Petree Racing	Chevrolet	20.429	92.692
17	14	Ron Hornaday Jr. (R)	A. J. Foyt Enterprises	Pontiac	20.429	92.692
18	4	Rich Bickle	Morgan–McClure Motorsports	Chevrolet	20.435	92.665
19	28	Ricky Rudd	Robert Yates Racing	Ford	20.438	92.651
20	36	Ken Schrader	MB2 Motorsports	Pontiac	20.450	92.597
21	9	Bill Elliott	Evernham Motorsports	Dodge	20.456	92.569
22	17	Matt Kenseth	Roush Racing	Ford	20.464	92.533
23	13	Hermie Sadler	SCORE Motorsports	Chevrolet	20.472	92.497
24	99	Jeff Burton	Roush Racing	Ford	20.489	92.420
25	71	Dave Marcis	Marcis Auto Racing	Chevrolet	20.489	92.420
26	40	Sterling Marlin	Chip Ganassi Racing with Felix Sabates	Dodge	20.490	92.416
27	43	John Andretti	Petty Enterprises	Dodge	20.502	92.362
28	31	Robby Gordon	Richard Childress Racing	Chevrolet	20.511	92.321
29	90	Hut Stricklin	Donlavey Racing	Ford	20.517	92.294
30	7	Kevin Lepage	Ultra Motorsports	Ford	20.525	92.258
31	5	Terry Labonte	Hendrick Motorsports	Chevrolet	20.531	92.231
32	18	Bobby Labonte	Joe Gibbs Racing	Pontiac	20.544	92.173
33	44	Buckshot Jones	Petty Enterprises	Dodge	20.551	92.142
34	15	Michael Waltrip	Dale Earnhardt, Inc.	Chevrolet	20.569	92.061
35	29	Rick Mast (Note: Rick Mast would replace Kevin Harvick for qualifying. Harvick would drive the car for the race.)	Richard Childress Racing	Chevrolet	20.578	92.021
36	11	Brett Bodine	Brett Bodine Racing	Ford	20.593	91.954
Provisionals
37	1	Kenny Wallace	Dale Earnhardt, Inc.	Chevrolet	20.745	91.280
38	26	Jimmy Spencer	Haas-Carter Motorsports	Ford	21.371	88.606
39	21	Elliott Sadler	Wood Brothers Racing	Ford	20.644	91.726
40	97	Kurt Busch (R)	Roush Racing	Ford	20.666	91.629
41	19	Casey Atwood (R)	Evernham Motorsports	Dodge	20.734	91.328
42	01	Jason Leffler (R)	Chip Ganassi Racing with Felix Sabates	Dodge	20.742	91.293
43	92	Stacy Compton	Melling Racing	Dodge	20.638	91.753
Failed to qualify
44	85	Carl Long	Mansion Motorsports	Ford	20.593	91.954
45	45	Kyle Petty	Petty Enterprises	Dodge	20.611	91.873
46	46	Frank Kimmel	Larry Clement Racing	Ford	20.809	90.999
Official qualifying results

== Race results ==
Fin	St	#	Driver	Team	Make	Laps	Led	Status	Pts	Winnings
1	6	32	Ricky Craven	PPI Motorsports	Ford	500	94	running	185	$130,475
2	4	88	Dale Jarrett	Robert Yates Racing	Ford	500	31	running	175	$114,252
3	11	22	Ward Burton	Bill Davis Racing	Dodge	500	45	running	170	$94,460
4	32	18	Bobby Labonte	Joe Gibbs Racing	Pontiac	500	0	running	160	$104,537
5	24	99	Jeff Burton	Roush Racing	Ford	500	0	running	155	$96,846
6	5	10	Johnny Benson Jr.	MBV Motorsports	Pontiac	500	5	running	155	$51,300
7	13	6	Mark Martin	Roush Racing	Ford	500	33	running	151	$82,251
8	12	12	Mike Wallace	Penske Racing South	Ford	500	14	running	147	$80,759
9	3	24	Jeff Gordon	Hendrick Motorsports	Chevrolet	500	58	running	143	$84,102
10	26	40	Sterling Marlin	Chip Ganassi Racing with Felix Sabates	Dodge	500	0	running	134	$66,435
11	20	36	Ken Schrader	MB2 Motorsports	Pontiac	500	0	running	130	$54,930
12	1	66	Todd Bodine	Haas-Carter Motorsports	Ford	500	9	running	132	$44,550
13	16	55	Bobby Hamilton	Andy Petree Racing	Chevrolet	500	92	running	129	$46,175
14	38	26	Jimmy Spencer	Haas-Carter Motorsports	Ford	500	0	running	121	$52,461
15	9	2	Rusty Wallace	Penske Racing South	Ford	500	0	running	118	$79,290
16	43	92	Stacy Compton	Melling Racing	Dodge	500	0	running	115	$44,040
17	39	21	Elliott Sadler	Wood Brothers Racing	Ford	500	34	running	117	$58,025
18	17	14	Ron Hornaday Jr. (R)	A. J. Foyt Enterprises	Pontiac	500	0	running	109	$37,855
19	34	15	Michael Waltrip	Dale Earnhardt, Inc.	Chevrolet	499	0	running	106	$42,200
20	37	1	Kenny Wallace	Dale Earnhardt, Inc.	Chevrolet	499	0	running	103	$66,043
21	30	7	Kevin Lepage	Ultra Motorsports	Ford	499	0	running	100	$43,100
22	35	29	Kevin Harvick (R)	Richard Childress Racing	Chevrolet	499	20	running	102	$77,677
23	7	33	Joe Nemechek	Andy Petree Racing	Chevrolet	499	0	running	94	$62,970
24	14	25	Jerry Nadeau	Hendrick Motorsports	Chevrolet	499	0	running	91	$42,450
25	41	19	Casey Atwood (R)	Evernham Motorsports	Dodge	498	1	running	93	$34,700
26	29	90	Hut Stricklin	Donlavey Racing	Ford	498	0	running	85	$31,450
27	2	8	Dale Earnhardt Jr.	Dale Earnhardt, Inc.	Chevrolet	496	0	running	82	$67,623
28	23	13	Hermie Sadler	SCORE Motorsports	Chevrolet	496	0	running	79	$30,750
29	10	93	Dave Blaney	Bill Davis Racing	Dodge	495	0	running	76	$33,600
30	33	44	Buckshot Jones	Petty Enterprises	Dodge	494	0	running	73	$41,450
31	18	4	Rich Bickle	Morgan–McClure Motorsports	Chevrolet	494	0	running	70	$30,300
32	25	71	Dave Marcis	Marcis Auto Racing	Chevrolet	493	0	running	67	$30,175
33	27	43	John Andretti	Petty Enterprises	Dodge	492	0	running	64	$65,077
34	31	5	Terry Labonte	Hendrick Motorsports	Chevrolet	483	0	brakes	61	$62,655
35	40	97	Kurt Busch (R)	Roush Racing	Ford	479	38	running	63	$37,800
36	22	17	Matt Kenseth	Roush Racing	Ford	459	26	rear end	60	$37,725
37	42	01	Jason Leffler (R)	Chip Ganassi Racing with Felix Sabates	Dodge	458	0	running	52	$37,600
38	28	31	Robby Gordon	Richard Childress Racing	Chevrolet	442	0	running	49	$61,799
39	19	28	Ricky Rudd	Robert Yates Racing	Ford	397	0	engine	46	$59,647
40	36	11	Brett Bodine	Brett Bodine Racing	Ford	289	0	running	43	$29,200
41	8	20	Tony Stewart	Joe Gibbs Racing	Pontiac	123	0	engine	40	$49,275
42	21	9	Bill Elliott	Evernham Motorsports	Dodge	115	0	overheating	37	$53,673
43	15	77	Robert Pressley	Jasper Motorsports	Ford	53	0	crash	34	$37,081
Failed to qualify
44		85	Carl Long	Mansion Motorsports	Ford					
45		45	Kyle Petty	Petty Enterprises	Dodge					
46		46	Frank Kimmel	Larry Clement Racing	Ford					
Official race results

=== Notes ===
Previous race: 2001 UAW-GM Quality 500	NASCAR Winston Cup Series; 2001 season	Next race: 2001 EA Sports 500
