= 2002 Pocono 500 =

14th race of the 2002 NASCAR Winston Cup Series

Race details
- Race 14 of 36 in the 2002 NASCAR Winston Cup Series
- The 2002 Pocono 500 program cover, featuring Ricky Rudd, winner of the 2001 race.
- Date: June 9, 2002
- Official name: 21st Annual Pocono 500
- Location: Long Pond, Pennsylvania, Pocono Raceway
- Course: Permanent racing facility
- Course length: 2.5 miles (4.0 km)
- Distance: 200 laps, 500 mi (804.672 km)
- Scheduled distance: 200 laps, 500 mi (804.672 km)
- Average speed: 143.426 miles per hour (230.822 km/h)

Pole position
Driver	Sterling Marlin	Chip Ganassi Racing
- Time: Set by 2002 owner's points

Most laps led
Driver	Ricky Rudd	Robert Yates Racing
- Laps: 60

Winner
No. 88	Dale Jarrett	Robert Yates Racing

Television in the United States
- Network: FOX
- Announcers: Mike Joy, Larry McReynolds, Darrell Waltrip

Radio in the United States
- Radio: Motor Racing Network

The 2002 Pocono 500 was the 14th stock car race of the 2002 NASCAR Winston Cup Series and the 21st iteration of the event. The race was held on Sunday, June 9, 2002, in Long Pond, Pennsylvania, at Pocono Raceway, a 2.5 miles (4.0 km) triangular permanent course. The race took the scheduled 200 laps to complete. At race's end, Dale Jarrett, driving for Robert Yates Racing, would pass disaster-stricken teammate Ricky Rudd with six to go when Rudd blew a tire while coasting to the finish on the final lap. As a result, the race would end under caution, and Jarrett would win his 29th career NASCAR Winston Cup Series win and his first and only win of the season. To fill out the podium, Mark Martin of Roush Racing and Jimmie Johnson of Hendrick Motorsports would finish second and third, respectively.

== Background ==
The layout of Pocono Raceway, the venue where the race was held.

The race was held at Pocono Raceway, which is a three-turn superspeedway located in Long Pond, Pennsylvania. The track hosts two annual NASCAR Sprint Cup Series races, as well as one Xfinity Series and Camping World Truck Series event. Until 2019, the track also hosted an IndyCar Series race.

Pocono Raceway is one of a very few NASCAR tracks not owned by either Speedway Motorsports, Inc. or International Speedway Corporation. It is operated by the Igdalsky siblings Brandon, Nicholas, and sister Ashley, and cousins Joseph IV and Chase Mattioli, all of whom are third-generation members of the family-owned Mattco Inc, started by Joseph II and Rose Mattioli.

Outside of the NASCAR races, the track is used throughout the year by Sports Car Club of America (SCCA) and motorcycle clubs as well as racing schools and an IndyCar race. The triangular oval also has three separate infield sections of racetrack – North Course, East Course and South Course. Each of these infield sections use a separate portion of the tri-oval to complete the track. During regular non-race weekends, multiple clubs can use the track by running on different infield sections. Also some of the infield sections can be run in either direction, or multiple infield sections can be put together – such as running the North Course and the South Course and using the tri-oval to connect the two.

=== Entry list ===
- (R) denotes rookie driver.

#	Driver	Team	Make
1	Steve Park	Dale Earnhardt, Inc.	Chevrolet
2	Rusty Wallace	Penske Racing	Ford
4	Mike Skinner	Morgan–McClure Motorsports	Chevrolet
5	Terry Labonte	Hendrick Motorsports	Chevrolet
6	Mark Martin	Roush Racing	Ford
7	Casey Atwood	Ultra-Evernham Motorsports	Dodge
8	Dale Earnhardt Jr.	Dale Earnhardt, Inc.	Chevrolet
9	Bill Elliott	Evernham Motorsports	Dodge
10	Johnny Benson Jr.	MBV Motorsports	Pontiac
11	Brett Bodine	Brett Bodine Racing	Ford
12	Ryan Newman (R)	Penske Racing	Ford
14	Stacy Compton	A. J. Foyt Enterprises	Pontiac
15	Michael Waltrip	Dale Earnhardt, Inc.	Chevrolet
17	Matt Kenseth	Roush Racing	Ford
18	Bobby Labonte	Joe Gibbs Racing	Pontiac
19	Jeremy Mayfield	Evernham Motorsports	Dodge
20	Tony Stewart	Joe Gibbs Racing	Pontiac
21	Elliott Sadler	Wood Brothers Racing	Ford
22	Ward Burton	Bill Davis Racing	Dodge
23	Hut Stricklin	Bill Davis Racing	Dodge
24	Jeff Gordon	Hendrick Motorsports	Chevrolet
25	Joe Nemechek	Hendrick Motorsports	Chevrolet
26	Todd Bodine	Haas-Carter Motorsports	Ford
28	Ricky Rudd	Robert Yates Racing	Ford
29	Kevin Harvick	Richard Childress Racing	Chevrolet
30	Jeff Green	Richard Childress Racing	Chevrolet
31	Robby Gordon	Richard Childress Racing	Chevrolet
32	Ricky Craven	PPI Motorsports	Ford
36	Ken Schrader	MB2 Motorsports	Pontiac
40	Sterling Marlin	Chip Ganassi Racing	Dodge
41	Jimmy Spencer	Chip Ganassi Racing	Dodge
43	John Andretti	Petty Enterprises	Dodge
44	Steve Grissom	Petty Enterprises	Dodge
45	Kyle Petty	Petty Enterprises	Dodge
46	Frank Kimmel	Larry Clement Racing	Ford
48	Jimmie Johnson (R)	Hendrick Motorsports	Chevrolet
55	Bobby Hamilton	Andy Petree Racing	Chevrolet
77	Dave Blaney	Jasper Motorsports	Ford
85	Carl Long (R)	Mansion Motorsports	Ford
88	Dale Jarrett	Robert Yates Racing	Ford
90	Hermie Sadler	Donlavey Racing	Ford
97	Kurt Busch	Roush Racing	Ford
99	Jeff Burton	Roush Racing	Ford
Official entry list

== Practice ==
Originally, three practice sessions were scheduled to be held, with one session on Friday and two on Saturday. However, due to overnight rain causing groundwater to seep out onto the racetrack on Friday, the Friday session was canceled.

=== First practice ===
The first practice session was held on Saturday, June 8, at 9:30 AM EST, and would last for 45 minutes. Sterling Marlin of Chip Ganassi Racing would set the fastest time in the session, with a lap of 54.009 and an average speed of 166.635 miles per hour (268.173 km/h).

Pos.	#	Driver	Team	Make	Time	Speed
1	40	Sterling Marlin	Chip Ganassi Racing	Dodge	54.009	166.635
2	28	Ricky Rudd	Robert Yates Racing	Ford	54.049	166.512
3	12	Ryan Newman (R)	Penske Racing	Ford	54.088	166.395
Full first practice results

=== Final practice ===
The final practice session was held on Saturday, June 8, at 11:15 AM EST, and would last for 45 minutes. Mark Martin of Roush Racing would set the fastest time in the session, with a lap of 54.297 and an average speed of 165.755 miles per hour (266.757 km/h).

Pos.	#	Driver	Team	Make	Time	Speed
1	6	Mark Martin	Roush Racing	Ford	54.297	165.755
2	28	Ricky Rudd	Robert Yates Racing	Ford	54.400	165.441
3	24	Jeff Gordon	Hendrick Motorsports	Chevrolet	54.442	165.313
Full Happy Hour practice results

== Qualifying ==
Qualifying was scheduled to be held on Friday, June 7, at 3:05 PM EST. However, due to overnight rain causing groundwater to seep out onto the racetrack, qualifying was canceled. As a result, the starting lineup was based on the current owner's points standings.

Sterling Marlin of Chip Ganassi Racing would win the pole.

No drivers would fail to qualify.

=== Full starting lineup ===
Pos.	#	Driver	Team	Make
1	40	Sterling Marlin	Chip Ganassi Racing	Dodge
2	48	Jimmie Johnson (R)	Hendrick Motorsports	Chevrolet
3	24	Jeff Gordon	Hendrick Motorsports	Chevrolet
4	17	Matt Kenseth	Roush Racing	Ford
5	2	Rusty Wallace	Penske Racing	Ford
6	6	Mark Martin	Roush Racing	Ford
7	20	Tony Stewart	Joe Gibbs Racing	Pontiac
8	97	Kurt Busch	Roush Racing	Ford
9	9	Bill Elliott	Evernham Motorsports	Dodge
10	28	Ricky Rudd	Robert Yates Racing	Ford
11	99	Jeff Burton	Roush Racing	Ford
12	32	Ricky Craven	PPI Motorsports	Ford
13	88	Dale Jarrett	Robert Yates Racing	Ford
14	8	Dale Earnhardt Jr.	Dale Earnhardt, Inc.	Chevrolet
15	12	Ryan Newman (R)	Penske Racing	Ford
16	5	Terry Labonte	Hendrick Motorsports	Chevrolet
17	15	Michael Waltrip	Dale Earnhardt, Inc.	Chevrolet
18	41	Jimmy Spencer	Chip Ganassi Racing	Dodge
19	18	Bobby Labonte	Joe Gibbs Racing	Pontiac
20	45	Kyle Petty	Petty Enterprises	Dodge
21	77	Dave Blaney	Jasper Motorsports	Ford
22	22	Ward Burton	Bill Davis Racing	Dodge
23	30	Jeff Green	Richard Childress Racing	Chevrolet
24	19	Jeremy Mayfield	Evernham Motorsports	Dodge
25	21	Elliott Sadler	Wood Brothers Racing	Ford
26	55	Bobby Hamilton	Andy Petree Racing	Chevrolet
27	10	Johnny Benson Jr.	MBV Motorsports	Pontiac
28	31	Robby Gordon	Richard Childress Racing	Chevrolet
29	4	Mike Skinner	Morgan–McClure Motorsports	Chevrolet
30	29	Kevin Harvick	Richard Childress Racing	Chevrolet
31	23	Hut Stricklin	Bill Davis Racing	Dodge
32	1	Steve Park	Dale Earnhardt, Inc.	Chevrolet
33	25	Joe Nemechek	Hendrick Motorsports	Chevrolet
34	44	Steve Grissom	Petty Enterprises	Dodge
35	43	John Andretti	Petty Enterprises	Dodge
36	11	Brett Bodine	Brett Bodine Racing	Ford
Provisionals
37	7	Casey Atwood	Ultra-Evernham Motorsports	Dodge
38	36	Ken Schrader	MB2 Motorsports	Pontiac
39	26	Todd Bodine	Haas-Carter Motorsports	Ford
40	14	Stacy Compton	A. J. Foyt Enterprises	Pontiac
41	90	Hermie Sadler	Donlavey Racing	Ford
42	85	Carl Long (R)	Mansion Motorsports	Ford
43	46	Frank Kimmel	Larry Clement Racing	Ford
Official starting lineup

== Race results ==
Fin	#	Driver	Team	Make	Laps	Led	Status	Pts	Winnings
1	88	Dale Jarrett	Robert Yates Racing	Ford	200	35	running	180	$206,298
2	6	Mark Martin	Roush Racing	Ford	200	7	running	175	$141,003
3	48	Jimmie Johnson (R)	Hendrick Motorsports	Chevrolet	200	0	running	165	$83,570
4	40	Sterling Marlin	Chip Ganassi Racing	Dodge	200	2	running	165	$113,772
5	24	Jeff Gordon	Hendrick Motorsports	Chevrolet	200	30	running	160	$125,003
6	99	Jeff Burton	Roush Racing	Ford	200	9	running	155	$95,532
7	20	Tony Stewart	Joe Gibbs Racing	Pontiac	200	0	running	146	$96,043
8	15	Michael Waltrip	Dale Earnhardt, Inc.	Chevrolet	200	0	running	142	$59,265
9	2	Rusty Wallace	Penske Racing	Ford	200	0	running	138	$89,315
10	77	Dave Blaney	Jasper Motorsports	Ford	200	0	running	134	$75,815
11	7	Casey Atwood	Ultra-Evernham Motorsports	Dodge	200	0	running	130	$67,615
12	8	Dale Earnhardt Jr.	Dale Earnhardt, Inc.	Chevrolet	200	0	running	127	$78,612
13	45	Kyle Petty	Petty Enterprises	Dodge	200	0	running	124	$45,465
14	32	Ricky Craven	PPI Motorsports	Ford	200	4	running	126	$51,965
15	21	Elliott Sadler	Wood Brothers Racing	Ford	200	0	running	118	$65,215
16	36	Ken Schrader	MB2 Motorsports	Pontiac	200	0	running	115	$63,765
17	28	Ricky Rudd	Robert Yates Racing	Ford	200	60	running	122	$83,582
18	26	Todd Bodine	Haas-Carter Motorsports	Ford	199	0	engine	109	$67,852
19	31	Robby Gordon	Richard Childress Racing	Chevrolet	199	0	running	106	$68,371
20	10	Johnny Benson Jr.	MBV Motorsports	Pontiac	199	0	running	103	$71,990
21	41	Jimmy Spencer	Chip Ganassi Racing	Dodge	199	0	running	100	$41,665
22	23	Hut Stricklin	Bill Davis Racing	Dodge	199	0	running	97	$49,365
23	1	Steve Park	Dale Earnhardt, Inc.	Chevrolet	198	0	running	94	$70,915
24	11	Brett Bodine	Brett Bodine Racing	Ford	198	1	running	96	$49,179
25	18	Bobby Labonte	Joe Gibbs Racing	Pontiac	198	0	running	88	$83,693
26	44	Steve Grissom	Petty Enterprises	Dodge	198	0	running	85	$40,365
27	55	Bobby Hamilton	Andy Petree Racing	Chevrolet	197	0	running	82	$48,215
28	14	Stacy Compton	A. J. Foyt Enterprises	Pontiac	195	0	running	79	$39,565
29	90	Hermie Sadler	Donlavey Racing	Ford	193	0	running	76	$36,890
30	9	Bill Elliott	Evernham Motorsports	Dodge	180	26	engine	78	$63,296
31	43	John Andretti	Petty Enterprises	Dodge	179	4	running	75	$63,673
32	12	Ryan Newman (R)	Penske Racing	Ford	174	19	running	72	$44,440
33	22	Ward Burton	Bill Davis Racing	Dodge	173	0	running	64	$79,240
34	30	Jeff Green	Richard Childress Racing	Chevrolet	171	0	running	61	$36,040
35	17	Matt Kenseth	Roush Racing	Ford	161	3	running	63	$53,865
36	19	Jeremy Mayfield	Evernham Motorsports	Dodge	146	0	engine	55	$43,665
37	4	Mike Skinner	Morgan–McClure Motorsports	Chevrolet	142	0	engine	52	$35,500
38	5	Terry Labonte	Hendrick Motorsports	Chevrolet	102	0	engine	49	$64,208
39	29	Kevin Harvick	Richard Childress Racing	Chevrolet	81	0	transmission	46	$81,028
40	97	Kurt Busch	Roush Racing	Ford	67	0	crash	43	$43,100
41	25	Joe Nemechek	Hendrick Motorsports	Chevrolet	29	0	crash	40	$42,965
42	85	Carl Long (R)	Mansion Motorsports	Ford	18	0	brakes	0	$34,875
43	46	Frank Kimmel	Larry Clement Racing	Ford	8	0	overheating	0	$35,069
Official race results

Previous race: 2002 MBNA Platinum 400	NASCAR Winston Cup Series; 2002 season	Next race: 2002 Sirius Satellite Radio 400
