= 2001 UAW-GM Quality 500 =

29th race of the 2001 NASCAR Winston Cup Series

Race details
- Race 29 of 36 in the 2001 NASCAR Winston Cup Series
- The 2001 UAW-GM Quality 500 program cover, with artwork by NASCAR artist Sam Bass.
- Date: October 7, 2001
- Official name: 42nd Annual UAW-GM Quality 500
- Location: Concord, North Carolina, Lowe's Motor Speedway
- Course: Permanent racing facility
- Course length: 1.5 miles (2.41 km)
- Distance: 334 laps, 501 mi (806.281 km)
- Average speed: 139.006 miles per hour (223.708 km/h)

Pole position
Driver	Jimmy Spencer	Haas-Carter Motorsports
- Time: 29.166

Most laps led
Driver	Sterling Marlin	Chip Ganassi Racing with Felix Sabates
- Laps: 135

Winner
No. 40	Sterling Marlin	Chip Ganassi Racing with Felix Sabates

Television in the United States
- Network: TNT (moved from NBC due to the announcement of the United States invasion of Afghanistan)
- Announcers: Allen Bestwick, Benny Parsons, Wally Dallenbach Jr.

Radio in the United States
- Radio: Performance Racing Network

The 2001 UAW-GM Quality 500 was the 29th stock car race of the 2001 NASCAR Winston Cup Series and the 42nd iteration of the event. The race was held on Sunday, October 7, 2001, in Concord, North Carolina, at Lowe's Motor Speedway, a 1.5 miles (2.4 km) permanent quad-oval. The race took the scheduled 334 laps to complete. At race's end, Sterling Marlin, driving for Chip Ganassi Racing with Felix Sabates, would dominate the late stages of the race to win his eighth career NASCAR Winston Cup Series victory and his second and final victory of the season. To fill out the podium, Tony Stewart, driving for Joe Gibbs Racing, and Ward Burton, driving for Bill Davis Racing, would finish second and third, respectively. This race marked the official debut of Jimmie Johnson in the Cup Series.

The race was interrupted from its broadcast on NBC due to then-president George W. Bush announcing the United States invasion of Afghanistan, moving the race to TNT.

== Background ==
The layout of Lowe's Motor Speedway, the venue where the race was held.

Lowe's Motor Speedway is a motorsports complex located in Concord, North Carolina, United States 13 miles from Charlotte, North Carolina. The complex features a 1.5 miles (2.4 km) quad oval track that hosts NASCAR racing including the prestigious Coca-Cola 600 on Memorial Day weekend and the NEXTEL All-Star Challenge, as well as the UAW-GM Quality 500. The speedway was built in 1959 by Bruton Smith and is considered the home track for NASCAR with many race teams located in the Charlotte area. The track is owned and operated by Speedway Motorsports Inc. (SMI) with Marcus G. Smith (son of Bruton Smith) as track president.

=== Entry list ===
- (R) denotes rookie driver.

#	Driver	Team	Make
1	Kenny Wallace	Dale Earnhardt, Inc.	Chevrolet
01	Jason Leffler (R)	Chip Ganassi Racing with Felix Sabates	Dodge
2	Rusty Wallace	Penske Racing South	Ford
02	Ryan Newman	Penske Racing South	Ford
4	Bobby Hamilton Jr.	Morgan–McClure Motorsports	Chevrolet
5	Terry Labonte	Hendrick Motorsports	Chevrolet
6	Mark Martin	Roush Racing	Ford
7	Kevin Lepage	Ultra Motorsports	Ford
8	Dale Earnhardt Jr.	Dale Earnhardt, Inc.	Chevrolet
9	Bill Elliott	Evernham Motorsports	Dodge
10	Johnny Benson Jr.	MBV Motorsports	Pontiac
11	Brett Bodine	Brett Bodine Racing	Ford
12	Mike Wallace	Penske Racing South	Ford
14	Ron Hornaday Jr. (R)	A. J. Foyt Enterprises	Pontiac
15	Michael Waltrip	Dale Earnhardt, Inc.	Chevrolet
17	Matt Kenseth	Roush Racing	Ford
18	Bobby Labonte	Joe Gibbs Racing	Pontiac
19	Casey Atwood (R)	Evernham Motorsports	Dodge
20	Tony Stewart	Joe Gibbs Racing	Pontiac
21	Elliott Sadler	Wood Brothers Racing	Ford
22	Ward Burton	Bill Davis Racing	Dodge
24	Jeff Gordon	Hendrick Motorsports	Chevrolet
25	Jerry Nadeau	Hendrick Motorsports	Chevrolet
26	Jimmy Spencer	Haas-Carter Motorsports	Ford
28	Ricky Rudd	Robert Yates Racing	Ford
29	Kevin Harvick (R)	Richard Childress Racing	Chevrolet
30	Jeff Green	Richard Childress Racing	Chevrolet
31	Robby Gordon	Richard Childress Racing	Chevrolet
32	Ricky Craven	PPI Motorsports	Ford
33	Joe Nemechek	Andy Petree Racing	Chevrolet
36	Ken Schrader	MBV Motorsports	Pontiac
40	Sterling Marlin	Chip Ganassi Racing with Felix Sabates	Dodge
43	John Andretti	Petty Enterprises	Dodge
44	Buckshot Jones	Petty Enterprises	Dodge
45	Kyle Petty	Petty Enterprises	Dodge
46	Frank Kimmel	Larry Clement Racing	Ford
48	Jimmie Johnson	Hendrick Motorsports	Chevrolet
55	Bobby Hamilton	Andy Petree Racing	Chevrolet
57	Derrike Cope	Team CLR	Ford
66	Todd Bodine	Haas-Carter Motorsports	Ford
75	Stuart Kirby	Bob Schacht Motorsports	Ford
77	Robert Pressley	Jasper Motorsports	Ford
85	Carl Long	Mansion Motorsports	Ford
88	Dale Jarrett	Robert Yates Racing	Ford
90	Hut Stricklin	Donlavey Racing	Ford
92	Stacy Compton	Melling Racing	Dodge
93	Dave Blaney	Bill Davis Racing	Dodge
97	Kurt Busch (R)	Roush Racing	Ford
99	Jeff Burton	Roush Racing	Ford
Official entry list

== Practice ==
Originally, three practice sessions were planned to be held, with one on Thursday, October 4, and two on Saturday, October 6. However, due to rain, the AM session on Saturday was cancelled.

=== First practice ===
The first practice session was held on Thursday, October 4, at 3:30 PM EST. The session would last for two hours. Ryan Newman, driving for Penske Racing South, would set the fastest time in the session, with a lap of 29.472 and an average speed of 183.225 miles per hour (294.872 km/h).

Pos.	#	Driver	Team	Make	Time	Speed
1	02	Ryan Newman	Penske Racing South	Ford	29.472	183.225
2	77	Robert Pressley	Jasper Motorsports	Ford	29.614	182.346
3	1	Kenny Wallace	Dale Earnhardt, Inc.	Chevrolet	29.623	182.291
Full first practice results

=== Second and final practice ===
The final practice session, sometimes referred to as Happy Hour, was held on Saturday, October 6, at 4:00 PM EST. The session would last for one hour. Ken Schrader, driving for MB2 Motorsports, and Tony Stewart, driving for Joe Gibbs Racing, would both set the fastest time in the session, with a lap of 30.368 and an average speed of 177.819 miles per hour (286.172 km/h).

Pos.	#	Driver	Team	Make	Time	Speed
1	36	Ken Schrader	MB2 Motorsports	Pontiac	30.368	177.819
2	20	Tony Stewart	Joe Gibbs Racing	Pontiac	30.368	177.819
3	24	Jeff Gordon	Hendrick Motorsports	Chevrolet	30.413	177.556
Full Happy Hour practice results

== Qualifying ==
Qualifying was held on Thursday, October 4, at 7:00 PM EST. Each driver would have two laps to set a fastest time; the fastest of the two would count as their official qualifying lap. Positions 1-36 would be decided on time, while positions 37-43 would be based on provisionals. Six spots are awarded by the use of provisionals based on owner's points. The seventh is awarded to a past champion who has not otherwise qualified for the race. If no past champ needs the provisional, the next team in the owner points will be awarded a provisional.

Jimmy Spencer, driving for Haas-Carter Motorsports, would win the pole, setting a time of 29.166 and an average speed of 185.147 miles per hour (297.965 km/h).

Six drivers would fail to qualify: Kyle Petty, Derrike Cope, Jeff Green, Robby Gordon, Buckshot Jones, and Frank Kimmel.

=== Full qualifying results ===
Pos.	#	Driver	Team	Make	Time	Speed
1	26	Jimmy Spencer	Haas-Carter Motorsports	Ford	29.166	185.147
2	66	Todd Bodine	Haas-Carter Motorsports	Ford	29.270	184.489
3	1	Kenny Wallace	Dale Earnhardt, Inc.	Chevrolet	29.342	184.037
4	02	Ryan Newman	Penske Racing South	Ford	29.349	183.993
5	7	Kevin Lepage	Ultra Motorsports	Ford	29.383	183.780
6	20	Tony Stewart	Joe Gibbs Racing	Pontiac	29.400	183.673
7	18	Bobby Labonte	Joe Gibbs Racing	Pontiac	29.449	183.368
8	6	Mark Martin	Roush Racing	Ford	29.449	183.368
9	8	Dale Earnhardt Jr.	Dale Earnhardt, Inc.	Chevrolet	29.455	183.331
10	25	Jerry Nadeau	Hendrick Motorsports	Chevrolet	29.464	183.275
11	10	Johnny Benson Jr.	MBV Motorsports	Pontiac	29.470	183.237
12	33	Joe Nemechek	Andy Petree Racing	Chevrolet	29.487	183.132
13	40	Sterling Marlin	Chip Ganassi Racing with Felix Sabates	Dodge	29.507	183.007
14	29	Kevin Harvick (R)	Richard Childress Racing	Chevrolet	29.514	182.964
15	48	Jimmie Johnson	Hendrick Motorsports	Chevrolet	29.517	182.945
16	92	Stacy Compton	Melling Racing	Dodge	29.556	182.704
17	90	Hut Stricklin	Donlavey Racing	Ford	29.586	182.519
18	9	Bill Elliott	Evernham Motorsports	Dodge	29.590	182.494
19	28	Ricky Rudd	Robert Yates Racing	Ford	29.594	182.469
20	24	Jeff Gordon	Hendrick Motorsports	Chevrolet	29.626	182.272
21	15	Michael Waltrip	Dale Earnhardt, Inc.	Chevrolet	29.628	182.260
22	75	Stuart Kirby	Bob Schacht Motorsports	Ford	29.629	182.254
23	4	Bobby Hamilton Jr.	Morgan–McClure Motorsports	Chevrolet	29.632	182.235
24	2	Rusty Wallace	Penske Racing South	Ford	29.634	182.223
25	88	Dale Jarrett	Robert Yates Racing	Ford	29.649	182.131
26	22	Ward Burton	Bill Davis Racing	Dodge	29.656	182.088
27	11	Brett Bodine	Brett Bodine Racing	Ford	29.657	182.082
28	77	Robert Pressley	Jasper Motorsports	Ford	29.671	181.996
29	19	Casey Atwood (R)	Evernham Motorsports	Dodge	29.677	181.959
30	85	Carl Long	Mansion Motorsports	Dodge	29.685	181.910
31	43	John Andretti	Petty Enterprises	Dodge	29.702	181.806
32	17	Matt Kenseth	Roush Racing	Ford	29.708	181.769
33	01	Jason Leffler (R)	Chip Ganassi Racing with Felix Sabates	Dodge	29.712	181.745
34	36	Ken Schrader	MB2 Motorsports	Pontiac	29.721	181.690
35	14	Ron Hornaday Jr. (R)	A. J. Foyt Enterprises	Pontiac	29.730	181.635
36	55	Bobby Hamilton	Andy Petree Racing	Chevrolet	29.751	181.507
Provisionals
37	99	Jeff Burton	Roush Racing	Ford	29.998	180.012
38	21	Elliott Sadler	Wood Brothers Racing	Ford	29.858	180.856
39	12	Mike Wallace	Penske Racing South	Ford	29.875	180.753
40	32	Ricky Craven	PPI Motorsports	Ford	29.844	180.941
41	93	Dave Blaney	Bill Davis Racing	Dodge	29.762	181.439
42	5	Terry Labonte	Hendrick Motorsports	Chevrolet	30.107	179.360
43	97	Kurt Busch (R)	Roush Racing	Ford	30.003	179.982
Failed to qualify
44	45	Kyle Petty	Petty Enterprises	Dodge	29.794	181.245
45	57	Derrike Cope	Team CLR	Ford	29.802	181.196
46	30	Jeff Green	Richard Childress Racing	Chevrolet	29.858	180.856
47	31	Robby Gordon	Richard Childress Racing	Chevrolet	29.949	180.307
48	44	Buckshot Jones	Petty Enterprises	Dodge	29.969	180.186
49	46	Frank Kimmel	Larry Clement Racing	Ford	30.172	178.974
Official qualifying results

== Race results ==
Fin	St	#	Driver	Team	Make	Laps	Led	Status	Pts	Winnings
1	13	40	Sterling Marlin	Chip Ganassi Racing with Felix Sabates	Dodge	334	135	running	185	$196,360
2	6	20	Tony Stewart	Joe Gibbs Racing	Pontiac	334	130	running	175	$131,100
3	26	22	Ward Burton	Bill Davis Racing	Dodge	334	14	running	170	$119,185
4	9	8	Dale Earnhardt Jr.	Dale Earnhardt, Inc.	Chevrolet	334	0	running	160	$104,923
5	37	99	Jeff Burton	Roush Racing	Ford	334	0	running	155	$110,746
6	25	88	Dale Jarrett	Robert Yates Racing	Ford	334	0	running	150	$97,707
7	24	2	Rusty Wallace	Penske Racing South	Ford	334	0	running	146	$92,330
8	14	29	Kevin Harvick (R)	Richard Childress Racing	Chevrolet	334	0	running	142	$91,607
9	8	6	Mark Martin	Roush Racing	Ford	334	0	running	138	$88,381
10	7	18	Bobby Labonte	Joe Gibbs Racing	Pontiac	334	0	running	134	$101,657
11	1	26	Jimmy Spencer	Haas-Carter Motorsports	Ford	334	9	running	135	$87,350
12	32	17	Matt Kenseth	Roush Racing	Ford	334	1	running	132	$52,440
13	5	7	Kevin Lepage	Ultra Motorsports	Ford	333	0	running	124	$60,301
14	34	36	Ken Schrader	MB2 Motorsports	Pontiac	333	0	running	121	$55,170
15	18	9	Bill Elliott	Evernham Motorsports	Dodge	333	0	running	118	$68,903
16	20	24	Jeff Gordon	Hendrick Motorsports	Chevrolet	333	0	running	115	$83,982
17	2	66	Todd Bodine	Haas-Carter Motorsports	Ford	333	37	running	117	$53,580
18	21	15	Michael Waltrip	Dale Earnhardt, Inc.	Chevrolet	332	0	running	109	$46,205
19	4	02	Ryan Newman	Penske Racing South	Ford	332	0	running	106	$38,375
20	12	33	Joe Nemechek	Andy Petree Racing	Chevrolet	331	3	running	108	$72,170
21	19	28	Ricky Rudd	Robert Yates Racing	Ford	331	0	running	100	$69,772
22	43	97	Kurt Busch (R)	Roush Racing	Ford	331	0	running	97	$46,580
23	3	1	Kenny Wallace	Dale Earnhardt, Inc.	Chevrolet	331	1	running	99	$68,138
24	29	19	Casey Atwood (R)	Evernham Motorsports	Dodge	330	0	running	91	$37,855
25	28	77	Robert Pressley	Jasper Motorsports	Ford	330	0	running	88	$49,100
26	31	43	John Andretti	Petty Enterprises	Dodge	330	0	running	85	$72,652
27	42	5	Terry Labonte	Hendrick Motorsports	Chevrolet	329	0	running	82	$69,655
28	27	11	Brett Bodine	Brett Bodine Racing	Ford	328	0	running	79	$36,625
29	30	85	Carl Long	Mansion Motorsports	Dodge	328	0	running	76	$36,425
30	17	90	Hut Stricklin	Donlavey Racing	Ford	328	0	running	73	$33,800
31	36	55	Bobby Hamilton	Andy Petree Racing	Chevrolet	321	0	running	70	$43,675
32	16	92	Stacy Compton	Melling Racing	Dodge	302	0	transmission	67	$33,050
33	23	4	Bobby Hamilton Jr.	Morgan–McClure Motorsports	Chevrolet	296	0	engine	64	$32,975
34	39	12	Mike Wallace	Penske Racing South	Ford	281	0	engine	61	$62,189
35	40	32	Ricky Craven	PPI Motorsports	Ford	235	0	crash	58	$32,850
36	11	10	Johnny Benson Jr.	MBV Motorsports	Pontiac	230	4	engine	60	$41,605
37	38	21	Elliott Sadler	Wood Brothers Racing	Ford	223	0	running	52	$50,765
38	35	14	Ron Hornaday Jr. (R)	A. J. Foyt Enterprises	Pontiac	221	0	engine	49	$32,730
39	15	48	Jimmie Johnson	Hendrick Motorsports	Chevrolet	192	0	crash	46	$32,695
40	10	25	Jerry Nadeau	Hendrick Motorsports	Chevrolet	167	0	crash	43	$40,965
41	41	93	Dave Blaney	Bill Davis Racing	Dodge	111	0	crash	40	$32,635
42	22	75	Stuart Kirby	Bob Schacht Motorsports	Ford	46	0	crash	37	$32,605
43	33	01	Jason Leffler (R)	Chip Ganassi Racing with Felix Sabates	Dodge	44	0	crash	34	$40,835
Failed to qualify
44		45	Kyle Petty	Petty Enterprises	Dodge					
45		57	Derrike Cope	Team CLR	Ford					
46		30	Jeff Green	Richard Childress Racing	Chevrolet					
47		31	Robby Gordon	Richard Childress Racing	Chevrolet					
48		44	Buckshot Jones	Petty Enterprises	Dodge					
49		46	Frank Kimmel	Larry Clement Racing	Ford					
Official race results

Previous race: 2001 Protection One 400	NASCAR Winston Cup Series; 2001 season	Next race: 2001 Old Dominion 500
