= ARCA races at Michigan =

ARCA Menards Series races at Michigan International Speedway

ARCA Menards Series at Michigan

ARCA Menards Series
- Venue: Michigan International Speedway
- Location: Brooklyn, Michigan, United States

Circuit information
- Surface: Asphalt
- Length: 2.0 mi (3.2 km)
- Turns: 4

Stock car racing events in the ARCA Menards Series have been held at Michigan International Speedway, in Brooklyn, Michigan during numerous seasons and times of year since 1980.

== Current race ==
Henry Ford Health 200
ARCA Menards Series
- Corporate sponsor: Henry Ford Health
- First race: 1980
- Distance: 200 mi (320 km)
- Laps: 100
- Previous names: Norton Twin 200s (1980); Michigan 200 (1990); Michigan ARCA 200 (1991, 1999, 2007); GM Goodwrench 200 (1992–1993); All Sport Meijer 200 (1994); Meijer All Sport 200 (1995–1996); Jasper Engines 200 (1997–1998); Flagstar 200 (2000–2004); Hantz Group 200 (2005–2006); Racing for Wildlife 200 (2008–2010); RainEater Wiper Blades 200 (2011–2012); Patriot Pumps 200 (2013); Corrigan Oil 200 (2014–2017); Zomongo 200 (2018); VizCom 200 (2019–2020); Henry Ford Health System 200 (2021)
- Most wins (driver): Jeff Purvis (3)
- Most wins (team): Venturini Motorsports (5)
- Most wins (manufacturer): Chevrolet (12)

Circuit information
- Length: 2.0 mi (3.2 km)
- Turns: 4

The Henry Ford Health 200 is a 200-mile (320 km) annual ARCA Menards Series race held at Michigan International Speedway in Brooklyn, Michigan. The inaugural event was held on July 20, 1980 and was won by Joe Ruttman. The series has raced at least once annually at the track since 1990.

=== History ===
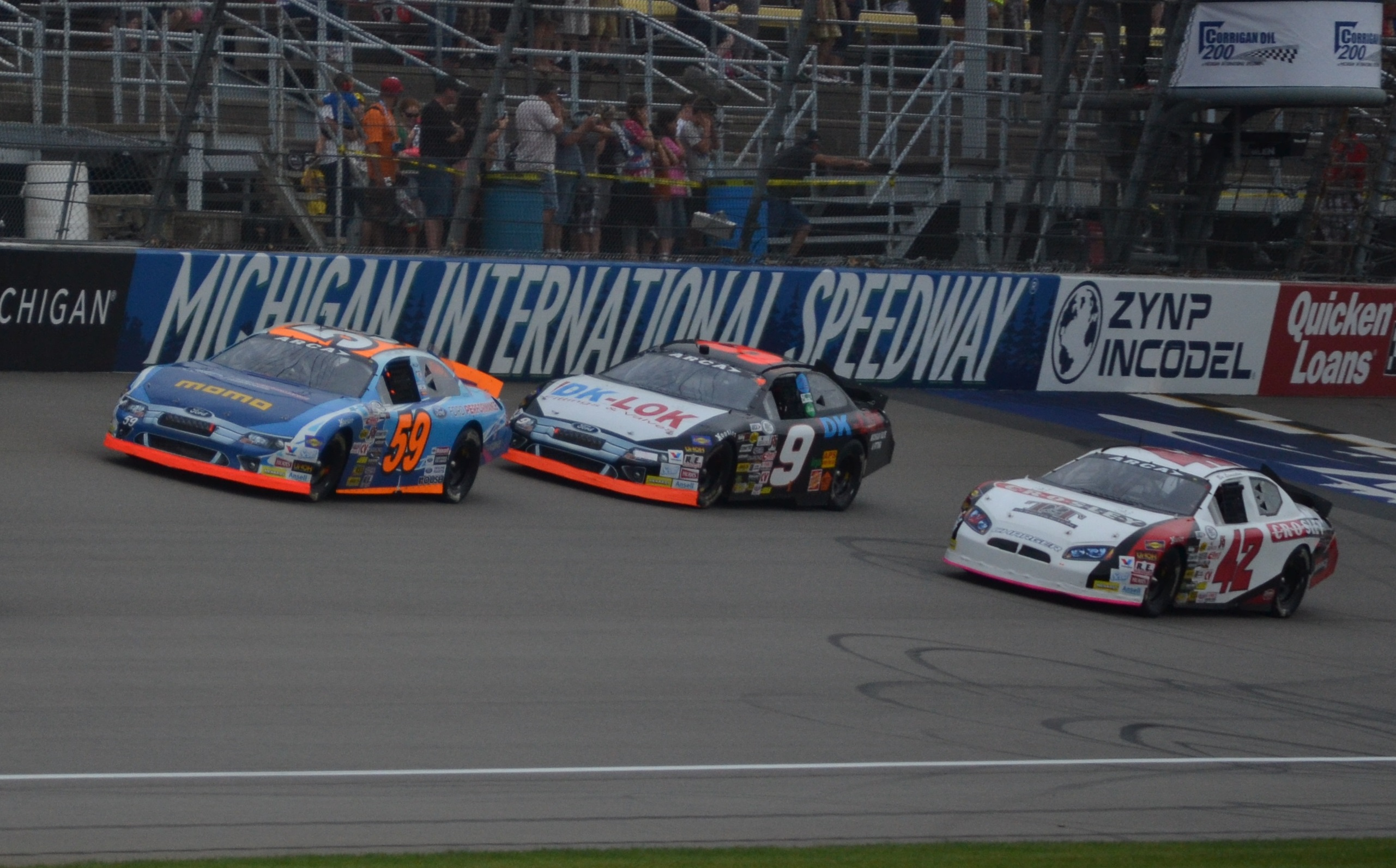
David Levine (No. 59), Thomas Praytor (No. 9) and Bo LeMastus (No. 42) in the 2015 ARCA race at Michigan

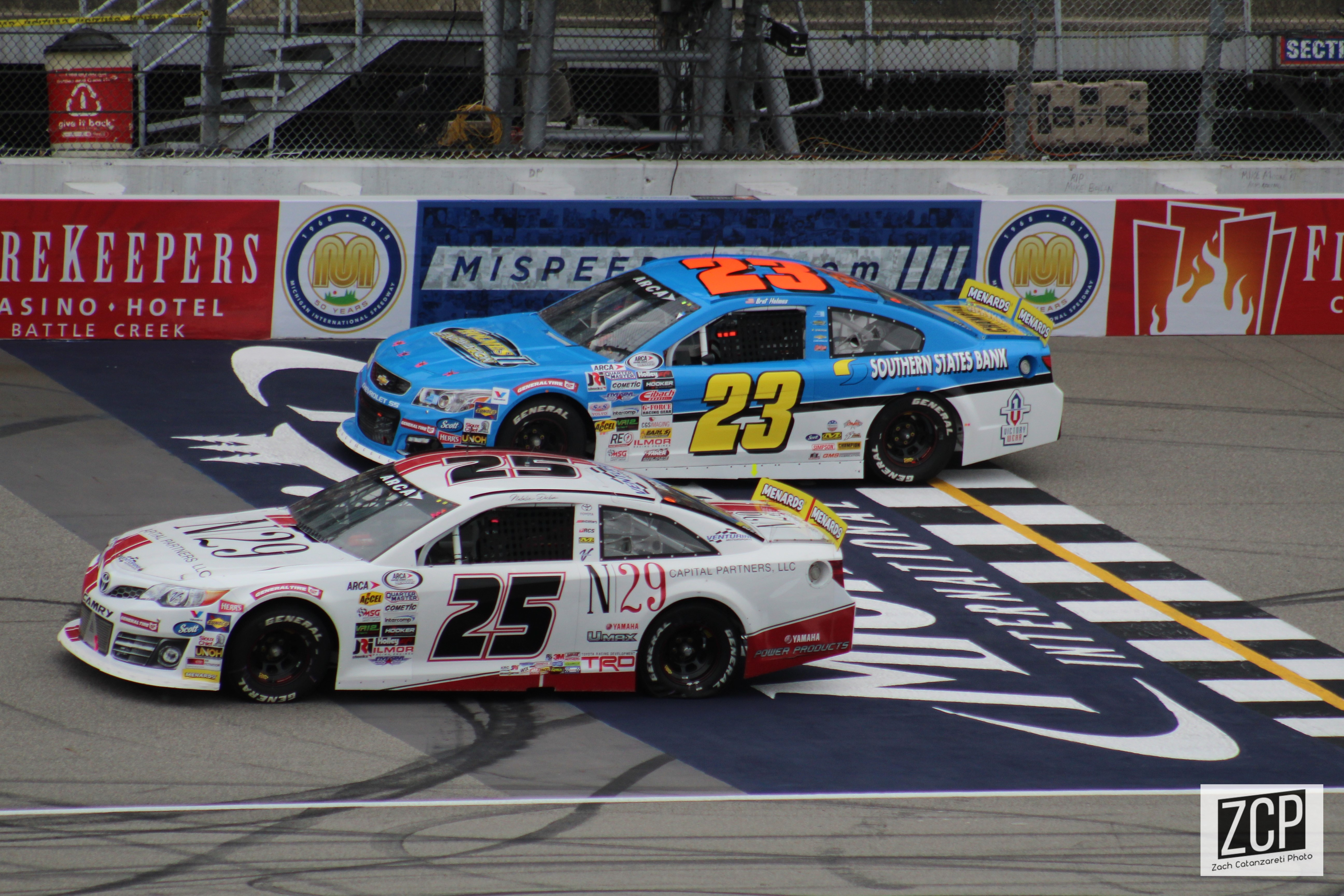
Natalie Decker (No. 25) and Bret Holmes (No. 23) in the 2018 ARCA race at Michigan

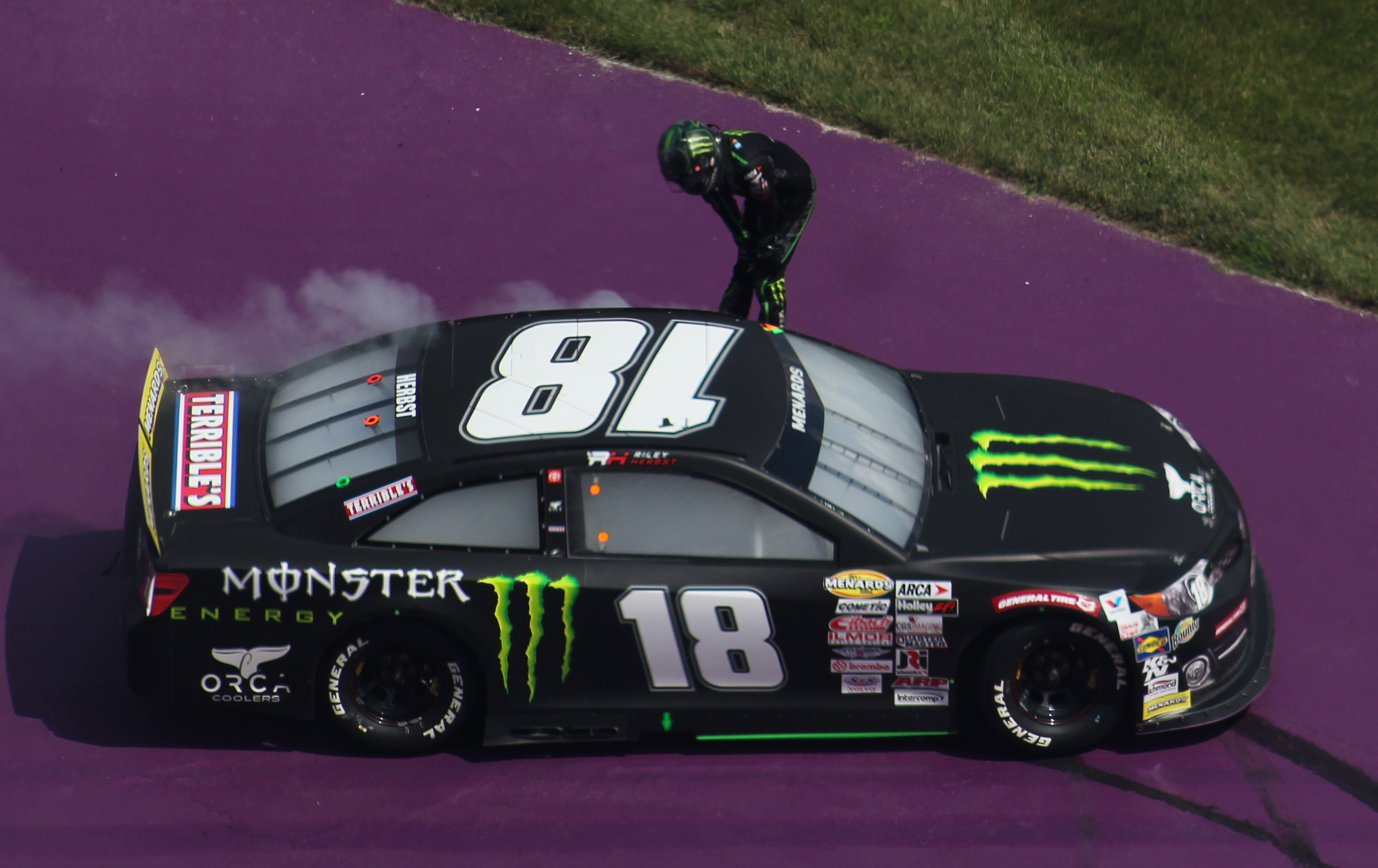
Riley Herbst (No. 18) celebrating after winning the 2020 ARCA race at Michigan

ARCA ran its first race at Michigan International Speedway in 1980, when two races were held. The series would not return for nearly a decade, when it was added back to the calendar in 1990, where it has remained ever since. The race has been run between June and August since its inception.

=== Past winners ===
Year	Date	No.	Driver	Team	Manufacturer	Race Distance		Race Time	Average Speed (mph)	Report
Year	Date	No.	Driver	Team	Manufacturer	Laps	Miles (km)	Race Time	Average Speed (mph)	Report
1980	July 20	70	Joe Ruttman	Speedway Engineering	Pontiac	100	200 (321.869)	1:40:16	119.681	Report
1981 – 1989	Not held									
1990	August 18	72	Tracy Leslie	Tracy Leslie	Oldsmobile	100	200 (321.869)	1:32:06	130.293	Report
1991	June 22	11	Dave Mader III	Folsom Racing	Buick	59*	118 (189.903)	1:02:04	114.071	Report
1992	June 20	29	Bob Keselowski	K-Automotive Racing	Chrysler	100	200 (321.869)	1:32:56	129.241	Report
1993	June 19	1	Jeff Purvis	Phoenix Racing	Chevrolet	100	200 (321.869)	1:42:52	116.656	Report
1994	June 18	1	Jeff Purvis	Phoenix Racing	Chevrolet	100	200 (321.869)	1:30:02	133.284	Report
1995	June 18	1	Jeff Purvis	Phoenix Racing	Chevrolet	100	200 (321.869)	1:32:26	129.823	Report
1996	June 22	94	Ron Barfield Jr.	Bill Elliott Racing	Ford	100	200 (321.869)	1:24:14	142.461	Report
1997	June 14	16	Tim Steele	Steele Racing	Ford	100	200 (321.869)	1:35:29	108.843	Report
1998	June 13	46	Frank Kimmel	Clement Racing	Chevrolet	100	200 (321.869)	1:43:13	116.260	Report
1999	June 12	46	David Keith	Michael Kranefuss	Ford	100	200 (321.869)	1:26:53	138.116	Report
2000	June 10	16	Tim Steele	Steele Racing	Ford	100	200 (320)	1:37:53	122.595	Report
2001	June 9	2	Kerry Earnhardt	Dale Earnhardt, Inc.	Chevrolet	100	200 (321.869)	1:24:55	122.595	Report
2002	June 15	77	Chad Blount	Braun Racing	Dodge	100	200 (321.869)	1:29:48	133.630	Report
2003	June 14	77	Casey Mears	Chip Ganassi Racing	Dodge	100	200 (321.869)	1:42:48	116.732	Report
2004	June 19	77	Reed Sorenson	Chip Ganassi Racing	Dodge	100	200 (321.869)	1:46:39	112.518	Report
2005	June 17	46	Frank Kimmel	Clement Racing	Ford	100	200 (321.869)	1:38:31	121.807	Report
2006	June 16	61	David Stremme	Rusty Wallace Racing	Dodge	100	200 (321.869)	1:22:13	145.956	Report
2007	June 15	99	Erik Darnell	Roush Fenway Racing	Ford	100	200 (321.869)	1:42:39	116.902	Report
2008	June 13	20	Justin Lofton	Eddie Sharp Racing	Dodge	100	200 (321.869)	1:19:41	150.596	Report
2009	June 12	77	Parker Kligerman	Cunningham Motorsports	Dodge	100	200 (321.869)	1:53:59	105.279	Report
2010	June 11	25	Mikey Kile	Venturini Motorsports	Toyota	100	200 (321.869)	1:21:51	146.610	Report
2011	June 17	41	Ty Dillon	Richard Childress Racing	Chevrolet	100	200 (321.869)	1:42:15	117.359	Report
2012	June 15	17	Chris Buescher	Roulo Brothers Racing	Ford	100	200 (321.869)	1:34:08	127.479	Report
2013	June 14	15	Brennan Poole	Venturini Motorsports	Toyota	100	200 (321.869)	1:28:47	135.161	Report
2014	June 13	66	Austin Theriault	Venturini Motorsports	Toyota	100	200 (321.869)	1:19:32	150.880	Report
2015	June 12	52	Ross Kenseth	Ken Schrader Racing	Chevrolet	100	200 (321.869)	1:37:36	150.880	Report
2016	June 10	8	Brandon Jones	Ranier Racing with MDM	Chevrolet	100	200 (321.869)	1:20:29	149.099	Report
2017	June 16	8	Brandon Jones	MDM Motorsports	Chevrolet	100	200 (321.869)	1:54:43	132.865	Report
2018	June 8	28	Sheldon Creed	MDM Motorsports	Toyota	100	200 (321.869)	1:31:53	130.600	Report
2019	June 7	25	Michael Self	Venturini Motorsports	Toyota	100	200 (321.869)	1:12:34	165.365	Report
2020	August 9	18	Riley Herbst	Joe Gibbs Racing	Toyota	100	200 (321.869)	1:31:25	131.267	Report
2021	August 20	18	Ty Gibbs	Joe Gibbs Racing	Toyota	100	200 (321.869)	1:42:20	117.264	Report
2022	August 6	2	Nick Sanchez	Rev Racing	Chevrolet	100	200 (321.869)	1:30:40	132.353	Report
2023	August 4	20	Jesse Love	Venturini Motorsports	Toyota	105*	210 (337.869)	1:41:08	124.588	Report
2024	August 16	28	Connor Zilisch	Pinnacle Racing Group	Chevrolet	100	200 (321.869)	1:20:18	149.44	Report
2025	June 6	28	Brenden Queen	Pinnacle Racing Group	Chevrolet	100	200 (321.869)	1:23:01	144.549	Report
2026	June 5	18	Gio Ruggiero	Joe Gibbs Racing	Toyota	57*	116 (186.68)	1:04:5	105.42	Report

- 1991: Race shortened to 59 laps due to rain.
- 2023: Race extended due to an overtime finish.
- 2026: Race shortened to 57 laps due to rain.

==== Multiple winners (drivers) ====
# Wins	Team	Years won
3	Jeff Purvis	1993, 1994, 1995
2	Tim Steele	1997, 2000
2	Frank Kimmel	1998, 2005
2	Brandon Jones	2016, 2017

==== Multiple winners (teams) ====
# Wins	Team	Years won
5	Venturini Motorsports	2010, 2013, 2014, 2019, 2023
3	Phoenix Racing	1993, 1994, 1995
3	Joe Gibbs Racing	2020, 2021, 2026
2	Steele Racing	1997, 2000
2	Clement Racing	1998, 2005
2	Chip Ganassi Racing	2003, 2004
2	MDM Motorsports	2016, 2017
2	Pinnacle Racing Group	2024, 2025

==== Manufacturer wins ====
# Wins	Manufacturer	Years won
12	Chevrolet	1993, 1994, 1995, 1998, 2001, 2011, 2015, 2016, 2017, 2022, 2024, 2025
9	Toyota	2010, 2013, 2014, 2018, 2019, 2020, 2021, 2023, 2026
7	Ford	1996, 1997, 1999, 2000, 2005, 2007, 2012
6	Dodge	2002, 2003, 2004, 2006, 2008, 2009
1	Pontiac	1980
1	Oldsmobile	1990
1	Buick	1991
1	Chrysler	1992

== Former second race ==
Hantz Group 200
ARCA Menards Series
- Corporate sponsor: Hantz Group
- First race: 1980
- Last race: 2006
- Distance: 200 mi (320 km)
- Laps: 100
- Previous names: Gould Prix 150 (1980); Michigan ARCA 200 (1991, 1996); MediaOne 200 (1997); Michigan ARCA Re/Max 200 (2001)
- Most wins (manufacturer): Ford (3)

Circuit information
- Length: 2.0 mi (3.2 km)
- Turns: 4

The Hantz Group 200 was a 200-mile (320 km) annual ARCA Menards Series race held at Michigan International Speedway in Brooklyn, Michigan. The inaugural event was held on September 20, 1980, and was won by Billie Harvey. The race has only been held on seven occasions, with the final running taking place in 2006.

=== Past winners ===
Year	Date	No.	Driver	Team	Manufacturer	Race Distance		Race Time	Average Speed (mph)	Report
Year	Date	No.	Driver	Team	Manufacturer	Laps	Miles (km)	Race Time	Average Speed (mph)	Report
1980	September 20	31	Billie Harvey	N/A	Pontiac	75	150 (241.402)	1:05:48	129.063	Report
1981 – 1990	Not held									
1991	August 17	11	Stanley Smith	Folsom Racing	Buick	100	200 (321.869)	1:40:35	119.304	Report
1992 – 1995	Not held									
1996	July 27	16	Tim Steele	Steele Racing	Ford	100	200 (321.869)	1:08:33	140.679	Report
1997	July 26	66	Mark Thompson	Mike Brandt	Ford	100	200 (321.869)	1:45:01	114.268	Report
1998 – 2000	Not held									
2001	July 21	75	Blaise Alexander	Bob Schacht Motorsports	Pontiac	100	200 (321.869)	1:25:01	141.149	Report
2002 – 2004	Not held									
2005	August 19	27	Steve Wallace	Penske Racing	Dodge	106*	212 (341.181)	1:56:01	109.640	Report
2006	August 18	04	Brent Sherman	Brent Sherman Racing	Ford	105*	210 (341.181)	1:56:01	109.640	Report

- 2005 & 2006: Race extended due to a green–white–checker finish.

==== Manufacturer wins ====
# Wins	Manufacturer	Years won
3	Ford	1996, 1997, 2006
2	Pontiac	1980, 2001
1	Buick	1991
1	Dodge	2005

Previous race: General Tire 150 (Charlotte)	ARCA Menards Series; Henry Ford Health 200	Next race: Berlin ARCA 200
