= Nashville ARCA 150 =

ARCA Re/Max Series
- Venue: Nashville Superspeedway
- Location: Lebanon, Tennessee
- Corporate sponsor: (None)
- First race: 1992
- Distance: 89.400 mi (143.875 km)
- Laps: 113
- Previous names: PFG Lester 150 (2001–2006); Waste Management 200 (2001–2004); ARCA RE/MAX 200 (2005–2006); Toyota 150 (2007–2008)
- Most wins (driver): Frank Kimmel (3)
- Most wins (manufacturer): Chevrolet (7)

Circuit information
- Length: 1.330 mi (2.140 km)
- Turns: 4

The Nashville ARCA 150 was an Automobile Racing Club of America (ARCA) race at Nashville Superspeedway in Lebanon, Tennessee, held in the spring from 2001 to 2007. For the first six years, the race was known as the ARCA RE/MAX PFG Lester 150. A second race, known as the Waste Management 200 and Toyota ARCA 150, was held in August from 2001 to 2008, after which the track was removed from the series schedule.

== Past events ==
The inaugural ARCA race in 2001 was the very first race held at the track. The $18,695 first-place prize went to Ken Schrader, while female driver Shawna Robinson placed third. The 2001 second-place finisher in the spring, Frank Kimmel, went on to win the next three races at the track.

Year	Date	Event Name	Pole Winner	Race Winner	Team	Manufacturer	Race Distance		Race Time	Average Speed (mph)
Year	Date	Event Name	Pole Winner	Race Winner	Team	Manufacturer	Laps	Miles (km)	Race Time	Average Speed (mph)
2001	April 13	PFG Lester 150	Frank Kimmel	Ken Schrader	Ken Schrader Racing	Pontiac	113	150.629 (242.414)	1:39:50	90.528
2001	August 11	Waste Management 200	Frank Kimmel	Frank Kimmel	Clement Racing	Ford	151	201.283 (323.934)	1:41:26	118.795
2002	April 12	PFG Lester 150	Frank Kimmel	Frank Kimmel	Clement Racing	Ford	113	150.629 (242.414)	1:35:38	94.291
2002	August 9	Waste Management 200	Frank Kimmel	Frank Kimmel	Clement Racing	Ford	152*	202.616 (326.079)	1:50:23	108.685
2003	April 11	PFG Lester 150	Kyle Busch	Kyle Busch	Hendrick Motorsports	Chevrolet	113	150.629 (242.414)	1:45:33	85.625
2003	August 9	Waste Management 200	Frank Kimmel	Mario Gosselin	Gosselin Racing	Chevrolet	151	201.283 (323.934)	1:50:41	108.867
2004	April 9	PFG Lester 150	Ryan Hemphill	Blake Feese	Hendrick Motorsports	Chevrolet	113	150.629 (242.414)	1:32:42	97.275
2004	August 14	Waste Management 200	Ryan Hemphill	Joey Miller	Hagans Racing	Dodge	151	201.283 (323.934)	2:07:20	94.85
2005	March 26	PFG Lester 150	Erin Crocker	Chad Blount	ML Motorsports	Chevrolet	119*	158.627 (255.285)	1:32:42	102.43
2005	August 13	ARCA RE/MAX 200	Joey Miller	Joey Miller	Hagans Racing	Dodge	151	201.283 (323.934)	1:45:17	104.523
2006	April 15	PFG Lester 150	Steve Wallace	Stephen Leicht	Robert Yates Racing	Ford	115*	153.295 (246.704)	1:17:01	119.424
2006	August 12	ARCA RE/MAX 200	Brad Coleman	Mario Gosselin	DGM Racing	Chevrolet	146*	194.618 (313.207)	1:51:40	104.336
2007	April 7	Nashville ARCA 150	Cale Gale	Chad McCumbee	Andy Belmont Racing	Chevrolet	113	150.629 (242.414)	1:29:17	100.998
2007	August 11	Toyota ARCA 150	Michael McDowell	Jeremy Clements	Ken Appling	Chevrolet	113	150.629 (242.414)	1:13:00	123.526
2008	August 9	Toyota 150	Ken Butler III	Scott Speed	Eddie Sharp Racing	Toyota	117*	155.961 (250.995)	1:24;51	110.037

- 2002_{2}, 2005_{1}, 2006_{1}, 2008: Race extended due to a green-white-checker finish.
- 2006_{2}: Race shortened due to time constraits.

=== Multiple winners (drivers) ===
# Wins	Driver	Years won
3	Frank Kimmel	2001_{2}, 2002_{1,2}
2	Mario Gosselin	2003_{2}, 2006_{2}
2	Joey Miller	2004_{2}, 2005_{2}

=== Manufacturer wins ===
# Wins	Manufacturer	Years won
7	Chevrolet	2003_{1,2}, 2004_{1}, 2005_{1}, 2006_{2}, 2007_{1,2}
4	Ford	2001_{2}, 2002_{1,2} 2006_{1}
2	Dodge	2004_{2}, 2005_{2}
1	Pontiac	2001_{1}
1	Toyota	2008
