= ARCA races at Kansas =

ARCA Menards Series races at Kansas Speedway

ARCA Menards Series at Kansas

ARCA Menards Series
- Venue: Kansas Speedway
- Location: Kansas City, Kansas, United States

Circuit information
- Surface: Asphalt
- Length: 1.5 mi (2.4 km)
- Turns: 4

Stock car racing events in the ARCA Menards Series have been held at Kansas Speedway, in Kansas City, Kansas during numerous seasons and times of year since 2001.

Since 2020, the track has also hosted a second ARCA Menards Series race.

== Spring race ==
Tide 150
- Corporate sponsor: Tide
- First race: 2020
- Distance: 150 miles (241.402 km)
- Laps: 100
- Previous names: Dawn Ultra 150 (2020); Dutch Boy 150 (2021–2022); Dawn 150 (2023); Tide 150 (2024–2026)
- Most wins (team): Pinnacle Racing Group; Joe Gibbs Racing (2)
- Most wins (manufacturer): Chevrolet (4)

The Tide 150 is an ARCA Menards Series race held at Kansas Speedway. It is held on the race weekend of the NASCAR Cup Series' AdventHealth 400.

=== History ===
The race was added to the schedule in 2020 after the cancellation of the race at Chicagoland Speedway due to COVID-19 regulations in Illinois. It then became a permanent race on the ARCA Menards Series schedule in 2021.

Tide became the title sponsor of the race in 2024.

==== Race trend ====
In each year in that the race has been run, the race has been won by the driver who went on to win the series championship: Bret Holmes won it in 2020, which was his first ARCA win. Ty Gibbs won the 2021 race and also led every single lap in it, becoming the first driver since Kevin Swindell in 2012 at Chicagoland Speedway to lead every single lap of a main ARCA Series race. It was one of 10 races Gibbs won en route to winning the championship that year. Nick Sanchez won the 2022 race. It was his second win at Kansas as he won the 2021 fall race at the track. Jesse Love, the winner of the 2023 race, like Gibbs also went on to win 10 races and the series championship. In 2024, Connor Mosack won the event, but since he drove part-time, he didn't win the series championship. In 2025, Brenden Queen won the race. It was one of 8 races he won en route to winning the championship that year. Gio Ruggiero won the event, but since he drove full-time in the NASCAR Craftsman Truck Series and had a part-time deal in ARCA, he could not be in contention to win the series championship.

=== Past winners ===
Year	Date	No.	Driver	Team	Manufacturer	Race distance		Race time	Average speed (mph)	Report	Ref
Year	Date	No.	Driver	Team	Manufacturer	Laps	Miles (km)	Race time	Average speed (mph)	Report	Ref
2020	July 24	23	Bret Holmes	Bret Holmes Racing	Chevrolet	100	150 (241.402)	1:04.58	138.533	Report	
2021	May 1	18	Ty Gibbs	Joe Gibbs Racing	Toyota	100	150 (241.402)	1:12:43	123.768	Report	
2022	May 14	2	Nick Sanchez	Rev Racing	Chevrolet (2)	100	150 (241.402)	1:19:00	113.924	Report	
2023	May 6	20	Jesse Love	Venturini Motorsports	Toyota (2)	100	150 (241.402)	1:32:22	97.438	Report	
2024	May 4	28	Connor Mosack	Pinnacle Racing Group	Chevrolet (3)	100	150 (241.402)	1:15:21	119.443	Report	
2025	May 9	28	Brenden Queen	Pinnacle Racing Group (2)	Chevrolet (4)	105*	157.5 (253.472)	1:20:3	117.221	Report	
2026	April 18	18	Gio Ruggiero	Joe Gibbs Racing (2)	Toyota (3)	108*	162 (260.714)	1:40:0	97.054	Report	

- 2025 & 2026: Race extended due to a green–white–checker finish.

==== Multiple winners (teams) ====
# Wins	Team	Years won
2	Pinnacle Racing Group	2024, 2025
2	Joe Gibbs Racing	2021, 2026

== Fall race ==
Menards 150
- Corporate sponsor: Menards
- First race: 2001
- Distance: 150 miles (241.402 km)
- Laps: 100
- Previous names: BPU 200 (2001–2003); Kansas Lottery $200 Grand (2004–2006); Kansas Lottery $150 Grand (2007–2008); Kansas Lottery 150 (2009–2010, 2022); Kansas Lottery 98.9 (2011–2013); ARCA 98.9 (2014); Full Throttle S'loonshine 98.9 (2015); Kansas 150 (2016–2017); Kansas ARCA 150 (2018–2019); Speediatrics 150 (2020); Reese's 150 (2021, 2024–2025); Sioux Chief Fast Track 150 (2023); Menards 150 (2026–)
- Most wins (driver): Frank Kimmel (3)
- Most wins (team): Cunningham Motorsports & Venturini Motorsports (4)
- Most wins (manufacturer): Toyota & Chevrolet (9)

The Menards 150 is an ARCA Menards Series race held at the Kansas Speedway in Kansas City, Kansas. The inaugural race was held in 2001. It has been held on the same weekend as the NASCAR Cup Series' Hollywood Casino 400 since 2009.

=== History ===
From 2012 to 2021, this race was the season-finale for the series. The race was originally 201 miles and 134 laps long until 2006. Each year since 2007 to 2010 and since 2016, the race has been 150 miles and 100 laps long. The race was 148.5 miles and 99 laps from 2011 to 2015 to match the name of the race, the 98.9.

In 2021, the candy company Reese's, which joined ARCA as a corporate partner that year, also became the title sponsor of the season-finale race of the series, replacing Speediatrics. Reese's returned to racing sponsorship for the first time in 10 years, as they were previously a sponsor for Kevin Harvick in both the Xfinity and Cup Series when he drove for Richard Childress Racing, but left after the 2010 season. In 2022, Reese's switched their title sponsorship to the race at Lucas Oil Indianapolis Raceway Park and the Kansas Lottery, which was the title sponsor of the race from 2004 to 2013, returned as the title sponsor of the race. Sioux Chief Manufacturing would replace the Kansas Lottery as the race's title sponsor in 2023. Reese's would return as the sponsor in 2024. For 2026, the race was moved back to being the site of the finale for the first time since 2021. Menards assumed sponsorship rights over Reese's.

=== Past winners ===
Year	Date	No.	Driver	Team	Manufacturer	Race Distance		Race Time	Average Speed (mph)	Report	Ref
Year	Date	No.	Driver	Team	Manufacturer	Laps	Miles (km)	Race Time	Average Speed (mph)	Report	Ref
2001	June 3	67	Jason Jarrett	ML Motorsports	Chevrolet	134	201 (323.478)	1:38:28	122.478	Report	
2002	June 1	46	Frank Kimmel	Clement Racing	Ford	134	201 (323.478)	1:41:33	118.76	Report	
2003	June 1	64	Shelby Howard	CIMCO Racing	Dodge	134	201 (323.478)	1:42:02	118.197	Report	
2004	June 5	64	Ryan Hemphill	Braun Racing	Dodge (2)	79*	118.5 (190.707)	1:16:43	92.679	Report	
2005	July 2	67	Chad Blount	ML Motorsports (2)	Chevrolet (2)	134	201 (323.478)	1:46:40	113.063	Report	
2006	July 1	46	Frank Kimmel (2)	Clement Racing (2)	Ford (2)	134	201 (323.478)	2:01:29	99.273	Report	
2007	April 27	4	Scott Lagasse Jr.	Cunningham Motorsports	Dodge (3)	100	150 (241.402)	1:20:22	111.987	Report	
2008	April 26	2	Scott Speed	Eddie Sharp Racing	Toyota	100	150 (241.402)	1:12:05	124.855	Report	
2009	October 1	77	Parker Kligerman	Cunningham Motorsports (2)	Dodge (4)	103*	154.5 (248.643)	1:31:14	101.608	Report	
2010	September 30	41	Ty Dillon	Richard Childress Racing	Chevrolet (3)	100	150 (241.402)	1:11:21	126.139	Report	
2011	October 7	55	Alex Bowman	Venturini Motorsports	Toyota (2)	99	148.5 (238.988)	1:12:07	123.55	Report	
2012	October 19	22	Alex Bowman (2)	Cunningham Motorsports (3)	Dodge (5)	99	148.5 (238.988)	1:29:58	99.037	Report	
2013	October 4	44	Frank Kimmel (3)	ThorSport Racing	Toyota (3)	65*	97.5 (156.911)	0:53:01	110.343	Report	
2014	October 3	23	Spencer Gallagher	GMS Racing	Chevrolet (4)	99	148.5 (238.988)	1:36:50	92.014	Report	
2015	October 16	78	Mason Mitchell	Mason Mitchell Motorsports	Chevrolet (5)	99	148.5 (238.988)	1:25:44	103.927	Report	
2016	October 14	77	Chase Briscoe	Cunningham Motorsports (4)	Ford (3)	100	150 (241.402)	1:53:12	92.923	Report	
2017	October 20	28	Michael Self	MDM Motorsports	Chevrolet (6)	100	150 (241.402)	1:13:13	122.923	Report	
2018	October 19	28	Sheldon Creed	MDM Motorsports (2)	Toyota (4)	100	150 (241.402)	1:39:35	90.812	Report	
2019	October 18	15	Christian Eckes	Venturini Motorsports (2)	Toyota (5)	100	150 (241.402)	1:03:31	141.695	Report	
2020	October 16	10	Corey Heim	Fast Track Racing (1) with Venturini Motorsports (3)	Toyota (6)	100	150 (241.402)	1:11:39	125.611	Report	
2021	October 23	2	Nick Sanchez	Rev Racing	Chevrolet (7)	102*	153 (244.8)	1:14:42	120.482	Report	
2022	September 10	20	Corey Heim (2)	Venturini Motorsports (4)	Toyota (7)	105*	157.5 (253.47)	1:22:11	114.987	Report	
2023	September 8	18	Connor Mosack	Joe Gibbs Racing	Toyota (8)	100	150 (241.402)	1:09:10	130.12	Report	
2024	September 25	18	Tanner Gray	Joe Gibbs Racing (2)	Toyota (9)	100	150 (241.402)	1:22:08	109.578	Report	
2025	September 26	28	Brenden Queen	Pinnacle Racing Group	Chevrolet (8)	110*	165 (265.542)	1:37:16	101.782	Report	
2026	September 25	28	Carson Brown	Pinnacle Racing Group (2)	Chevrolet (9)	100	150 (241.402)	1:36:00	93.75	Report	

- 2004: Race shortened due to rain.
- 2009, 2021, 2022 & 2025: Races extended due to a green–white–checker finish.
- 2013: Race shortened due to threatening weather.

==== Multiple winners (drivers) ====
# Wins	Driver	Years won
3	Frank Kimmel	2002, 2006, 2013
2	Alex Bowman	2011, 2012
2	Corey Heim	2020, 2022

==== Multiple winners (teams) ====
# Wins	Team	Years won
4	Cunningham Motorsports	2007, 2009, 2012, 2016
4	Venturini Motorsports	2011, 2019, 2020, 2022
2	ML Motorsports	2001, 2005
2	Clement Racing	2002, 2006
2	MDM Motorsports	2017, 2018
2	Joe Gibbs Racing	2023, 2024
2	Pinnacle Racing Group	2025, 2026

Previous race: General Tire 150 (Phoenix)	ARCA Menards Series; Tide 150	Next race: Alabama Manufactured Housing 200

Previous race: Bush's Beans 200	ARCA Menards Series; Menards 150	Next race: Daytona ARCA 200 (the next season)
