= ARCA races at Berlin =

ARCA Menards Series races at Berlin Raceway

ARCA Menards Series at Berlin
ARCA Menards Series
- Venue: Berlin Raceway
- Location: Marne, Michigan, United States

Circuit information
- Surface: Paved
- Length: .438 mi (0.705 km)
- Turns: 4

Stock car racing events in the ARCA Menards Series have been held at Berlin Raceway, in Marne, Michigan during numerous seasons and times of year since 1958. Since 1999, the race has been scheduled on either the ARCA Menards Series or ARCA Menards Series East schedules each year except for 2019 (and run each year except that year and 2020).

== Current race ==
Herr's Snacks 200
ARCA Menards Series
- Venue: Berlin Raceway
- Location: Marne, Michigan, United States
- First race: 1958
- Distance: 87.6 (140.9785 km)
- Laps: 200
- Previous names: Zinsser SmartCoat 200 (2021–2022); Herr's Snacks 200 (2023, 2026); Berlin ARCA 200 (2024–2025)
- Most wins (driver): Frank Kimmel (3)
- Most wins (team): K Automotive Racing, Clement Racing, GMS Racing, Joe Gibbs Racing (3)
- Most wins (manufacturer): Toyota (9)

Circuit information
- Surface: Paved
- Length: .438 mi (0.705 km)
- Turns: 4

The Herr's Snacks 200 is an ARCA Menards Series race held at Berlin Raceway. Max Reaves is the defending race winner.

=== History ===
The MARC Racing Series (now known as the ARCA Menards Series) ran its inaugural race at the track in 1958. In 1958 and 1959, ARCA ran two annual races at the track. However, in 1960, only one race was held at the track. After being left off the ARCA schedule in 1961, the track was brought back in 1962. In the next eleven years, the ARCA series only ran at the track four times. After 1973, the track was again left off the ARCA schedule for twelve years.

ARCA finally returned to the track in 1986. However, the return was short-lived, as it was then taken off the schedule for another dozen years. In 1999, it was added back to the series schedule and remained on it each year until 2017, when it was taken off the ARCA schedule in exchange for a NASCAR K&N Pro Series East (now known as ARCA Menards Series East) race. ARCA brought the track back again in 2018, though it was left off of the series schedule for the next two years. Once more, in 2021, the series returned to the track.

=== Past winners ===
Year	Date	No.	Driver	Team	Manufacturer	Race distance		Race time	Average speed (mph)
Year	Date	No.	Driver	Team	Manufacturer	Laps	Miles (km)	Race time	Average speed (mph)
1958	July 25	–	Les Snow	–	Chevrolet	100	43.8 (70.489)	–	–
1958	September 12	2	Nelson Stacy	–	Chevrolet	100	43.8 (70.489)	–	–
1959	May 15	43	Bob James	–	Chevrolet	100	43.8 (70.489)	–	–
1959	June 12	43	Bob James	–	Chevrolet	100	43.8 (70.489)	–	–
1960	June 24	7	Don White	–	Ford	100	43.8 (70.489)	–	–
1961	Not held								
1962	June 29	–	Harold Smith	–	Ford	100	43.8 (70.489)	–	–
1963	Not held								
1964	September 4	30	Iggy Katona	–	Ford	100	43.8 (70.489)	–	–
1965 – 1967	Not held								
1968	May 29	2	Andy Hampton	–	Dodge	100	43.8 (70.489)	–	–
1969	Not held								
1970	July 3	–	Ramo Stott	–	Plymouth	200	87.6 (140.979)	–	–
1971 – 1972	Not held								
1973*	August 17	40	Bob Senneker	Colella Racing	Chevrolet	100	43.8 (70.489)	44:30	67.406
1974 – 1985	Not held								
1986	August 2	29	Bob Keselowski	K Automotive Racing	Chevrolet	100	43.8 (70.489)	28:18	56.21
1987 – 1998	Not held								
1999	July 10	46	Frank Kimmel	Clement Racing	Chevrolet	200	87.6 (140.98)	1:26:27	60.15
2000	July 15	16	Tim Steele	Steele Racing	Ford	204*	89.35 (143.8)	1:37:27	55.023
2001	September 22	16	Tim Steele	Steele Racing	Ford	200	87.6 (140.98)	1:23:07	63.244
2002	July 20	22	Fred Campbell	Vern Slagh	Ford	200	87.6 (140.98)	1:28:53	67.504
2003	May 24	46	Frank Kimmel	Clement Racing	Ford	200	87.6 (140.98)	1:24:55	70.658
2004	July 3	46	Frank Kimmel	Clement Racing	Ford	116*	50.81 (81.77)	52:19	66.518
2005	July 16	9	Joey Miller	Hagans Racing	Dodge	202*	88.5 (142.43)	1:41:02	52.543
2006	July 15	29	Brian Keselowski	K Automotive Racing	Dodge	200	87.6 (140.98)	1:51:19	47.216
2007	July 7	29	Brian Keselowski	K Automotive Racing	Dodge	200	87.6 (140.98)	1:23:58	62.88
2008	July 26	2	Scott Speed	Eddie Sharp Racing	Toyota	200	87.6 (140.98)	1:38:19	53.46
2009	July 25	6	Justin Lofton	Eddie Sharp Racing	Toyota	207*	90.67 (145.92)	1:48:51	49.92
2010	August 7	16	Joey Coulter	Coulter Motorsports	Chevrolet	200	87.6 (140.98)	1:17:37	77.297
2011	July 9	32	Matt Merrell	Win-Tron Racing	Dodge	200	87.6 (140.98)	1:10:21	85.272
2012	August 11	17	Chris Buescher	Roulo Brothers Racing	Ford	200	87.6 (140.98)	1:09:45	75.269
2013	August 10	15	Erik Jones	Venturini Motorsports	Toyota	200	87.6 (140.98)	1:13:58	70.975
2014	August 9	90	Grant Enfinger	GMS Racing	Chevrolet	200	87.6 (140.98)	1:17:22	67.858
2015	August 8	23	Grant Enfinger	GMS Racing	Chevrolet	200	87.6 (140.98)	1:17:38	67.632
2016	August 6	55	Dalton Sargeant	Venturini Motorsports	Toyota	200	87.6 (140.98)	1:22:52	63.427
2017	Not held								
2018	August 25	77	Joe Graf Jr.	Chad Bryant Racing	Ford	206*	90.2 (145.16)	1:26:44	62.35
2019 – 2020	Not held								
2021	July 17	21	Daniel Dye	GMS Racing	Chevrolet	200	87.6 (140.98)	1:18:47	66.715
2022	June 18	18	Sammy Smith	Kyle Busch Motorsports	Toyota	200	87.6 (140.98)	1:21:13	64.716
2023	June 17	18	William Sawalich	Joe Gibbs Racing	Toyota	200	87.6 (140.98)	1:20:10	65.686
2024	June 29	18	William Sawalich	Joe Gibbs Racing	Toyota	200	87.6 (140.98)	1:25:44	61.306
2025	June 14	70	Treyten Lapcevich	Nitro Motorsports	Toyota	200	87.6 (140.98)	1:37:40	53.770
2026	June 20	18	Max Reaves	Joe Gibbs Racing	Toyota	200	87.6 (140.98)	1:22:4	63.542

- 1973: Combination race between the ARCA Racing Series and the NASCAR Grand National East Series.
- 2000, 2005, 2009, & 2018: Race extended due to a green-white-checker finish.
- 2004: Race shortened due to rain.

=== Multiple winners (drivers) ===
# Wins	Driver	Years won
3	Frank Kimmel	1999, 2003, 2004
2	Tim Steele	2000, 2001
2	Brian Keselowski	2006, 2007
2	Grant Enfinger	2014, 2015
2	William Sawalich	2023, 2024

=== Multiple winners (teams) ===
# Wins	Team	Years won
3	K Automotive Racing	1986, 2006, 2007
3	Clement Racing	1999, 2003, 2004
3	GMS Racing	2014, 2015, 2021
Joe Gibbs Racing	2023, 2024, 2026	
2	Steele Racing	2000, 2001
2	Eddie Sharp Racing	2008, 2009
2	Venturini Motorsports	2013, 2016

=== Manufacturer wins ===
# Wins	Manufacturer	Years won
9	Toyota	2008, 2009, 2013, 2016, 2022–2026
7	Ford	2000–2004, 2012, 2018
6	Chevrolet	1986, 1999, 2010, 2014, 2015, 2021
4	Dodge	2005–2007, 2011

== East Series ==
Stars & Stripes 150
ARCA Menards Series East
- Venue: Berlin Raceway
- Location: Marne, Michigan, United States
- First race: 2017
- Distance: 65.7 (105.733 km)
- Laps: 150
- Previous names: Stars & Stripes 150 (2017)
- Most wins (driver): Todd Gilliland (1)
- Most wins (team): Bill McAnally Racing (1)
- Most wins (manufacturer): Toyota (1)

Circuit information
- Surface: Paved
- Length: .438 mi (0.705 km)
- Turns: 4

The Stars & Stripes 150 was a onetime ARCA Menards Series East event held at Berlin Raceway. Todd Gilliland is the lone winner of the event.

=== History ===
In 2017, the main ARCA race at the track was removed off the schedule for an East Series race at the track. Todd Gilliland won the only East Series race at the track. After one year on the East Series schedule, the race was moved back to the ARCA schedule in 2018 but taken off again in 2019.

A second East Series race was scheduled for July 25, 2020, but cancelled and replaced by a race at Toledo Speedway due to the COVID-19 pandemic. The race was moved back to the main ARCA Series schedule again in 2021.

=== Past winners ===
Year	Date	No.	Driver	Team	Manufacturer	Race distance		Race time	Average speed (mph)
Year	Date	No.	Driver	Team	Manufacturer	Laps	Miles (km)	Race time	Average speed (mph)
2017	July 1	16	Todd Gilliland	Bill McAnally Racing	Toyota	150	65.7 (105.733)	0:56:50	69.361
2018 – 2019	Not held								
2020	July 25	Cancelled due to the COVID-19 pandemic							

Previous race: Sunset Hill Shooting Range 150	ARCA Menards Series; Herr's Snacks 200	Next race: Shore Lunch 250
