= Frank Kimmel =

American racing driver (born 1962)

- Born: Francis James Kimmel; April 30, 1962 (age 64); Clarksville, Indiana, U.S.

NASCAR Cup Series career
- 7 races run over 4 years
- Best finish: 54th (2002)
- First race: 1998 Pepsi 400 (Michigan)
- Last race: 2002 Pocono 500 (Pocono)
Wins	Top tens	Poles
0	0	0

NASCAR O'Reilly Auto Parts Series career
- 1 race run over 1 year
- Best finish: 94th (2001)
- First race: 2001 Pepsi 300 (Nashville)
Wins	Top tens	Poles
0	0	0

NASCAR FedEx Freight Truck Series career
- 14 races run over 10 years
- 2013 position: 48th
- Best finish: 44th (1996)
- First race: 1995 Ford Credit 200 (Louisville)
- Last race: 2013 Ford EcoBoost 200 (Homestead)
Wins	Top tens	Poles
0	2	0

ARCA Menards Series career
- 503 races run over 27 years
- Best finish: 1st (1998, 2000, 2001, 2002, 2003, 2004, 2005, 2006, 2007, 2013)
- First race: 1990 Toledo Arca 125 (Toledo)
- Last race: 2016 Eddie Gilstrap Motors Fall Classic (Salem)
- First win: 1994 Toledo Arca 150 (Toledo)
- Last win: 2013 Kansas Lottery 98.9 (Kansas City)
Wins	Top tens	Poles
80	374	45

Francis James Kimmel (born April 30, 1962) is an American former stock car racing driver. He competed primarily in the ARCA Racing Series, from 1990 through 2016. Kimmel is the most successful driver in ARCA history, winning the ARCA championship ten times; first in 1998, then the 2000 through 2007 championships, and again in 2013. Kimmel also holds the all-time record for race wins in the ARCA Racing Series with 80.

Kimmel is currently the crew chief for Jason Kitzmiller and CR7 Motorsports, which fields the No. 97 Chevrolet in the ARCA Series. From after the end of his driving career in 2017 through 2019, he returned to Venturini Motorsports (the team he drove for part-time in 2015) as a crew chief and a driving coach for their drivers, such as Leilani Münter, Gavin Harlien, and Hailie Deegan.

== Personal ==
Kimmel was born in Clarksville, Indiana on April 30, 1962. His father, Bill Kimmel, Sr., was a three-time ARCA race winner. Frank resides in Borden, Indiana with his wife Donna. He has two children Holly and Frank II. He also has two years of college education. Kimmel is involved in his community, participating in school events and coaching youth sports.

== Early career ==
Kimmel made his first career start racing a street stock at the age of fifteen. Seven years later, he moved to late models. Before racing in ARCA, Kimmel won three championships racing Late Models.

== Motorsports career ==
=== ARCA ===
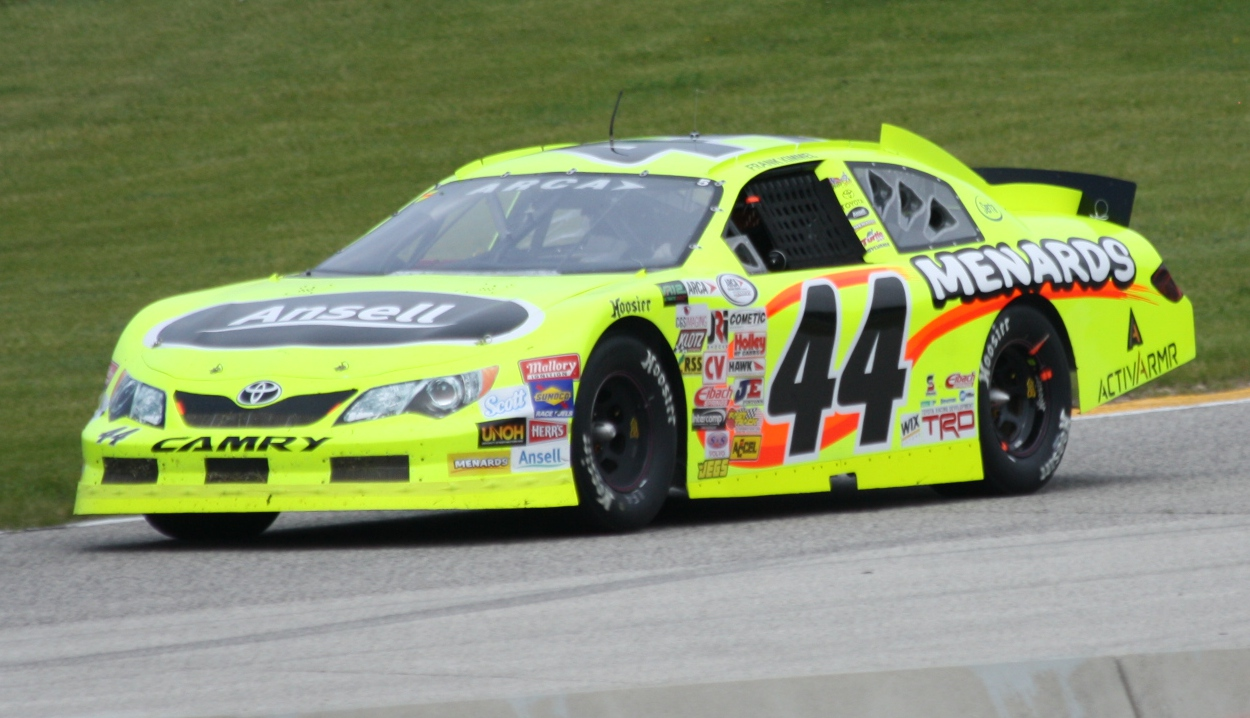
Kimmel's 2013 championship car at Road America

Kimmel's first ARCA start was in 1990. His first full season was 1992, driving the No. 02 Indiana Steel Co. Pontiac for Wallace Racing. Kimmel was consistent and was able to claim Rookie of the Year honors. Kimmel joined Shirley Racing in 1993, still driving in the No. 02. Kimmel won his first race at Toledo Speedway in 1994 en route to finishing second in the points that year.

Kimmel would join Steve Rauch Racing in 1996 on a part-time schedule and transitioned from the No. 02 to the No. 46. Despite being part-time that year, Kimmel won three races and finished eighth in the points. He would return to full-time in 1997 in the No. 46, winning one race en route to finishing second in the points.

In 1998, Kimmel joined Clement Racing, driving the No. 46 Advance Auto Parts Chevrolet. Kimmel found immediate success, winning nine races en route to his first ARCA championship. After finishing second in the points in 1999, Kimmel won eight championships in a row (2000–2007). During this streak, Kimmel broke Iggy Katona's record for the most championships in ARCA Series history. He became the first ever ARCA Racing Series driver to be assigned a seat in the IROC (International Race of Champions) Series in 2006.

In 2006, the crew chief on Kimmel's team was his brother, Bill Kimmel Jr.

In 2008, Kimmel left Clement Racing after ten seasons, where he won 63 races and nine championships. Kimmel would form his own team with his brother Bill, known as Kimmel Racing in the No. 44. The team initially ran a Dodge with the support of Cunningham Motorsport and sponsorship from Riverside Auto at Daytona before joining forces with Ford Racing for the remainder of 2008.

On August 2, 2008, Kimmel was injured in a three car crash on lap 68 at Pocono Raceway, suffering a concussion. He was taken to the hospital for observation overnight. Though lacking a title sponsor for the entire year of 2008, Kimmel and his team won three races and were able to pull out a second-place finish in points by a margin of 50. The loss of the championship was not the surprising part of that year but rather the surprise was how close Kimmel was to winning a tenth title. As a result of his performance, Ansell and Menards joined forces with him the following season, a partnership that continued until the end of his racing career.

Following the 2011 ARCA Racing Series season, Kimmel left the Kimmel Racing team, and drove for ThorSport Racing in the ARCA Racing Series starting in 2012.

On June 30, 2013, under crew chief Jeriod Prince, Kimmel tied Iggy Katona's record for most wins in the ARCA Racing Series, winning his 79th career victory at Winchester Speedway. On October 4, 2013, he clinched his tenth ARCA Racing Series championship at Kansas Speedway. Kimmel went on to win the race, surpassing Katona to become the all-time win leader in ARCA Racing Series history.

For the 2014 season, Kimmel moved to Win-Tron Racing, retaining his No. 44. His final start came in 2016.

Kimmel holds ARCA records in a number of categories, including starts, wins, and poles.

On December 20, 2019, KBR Development hired Kimmel as team general manager.

=== NASCAR ===
Kimmel made seven starts in the NASCAR Cup Series, five of those coming with Travis Carter Motorsports in 2002. He found little success in the series. His best finish to date was a 26th-place finish at Charlotte Motor Speedway. He had one Busch Series start. Through 2010 he had two top-ten finishes from twelve Craftsman Truck Series starts. and ran the 2011 and 2013 Camping World Truck Series season finales at Homestead-Miami Speedway for ThorSport Racing.

=== IROC ===
Kimmel was invited to participate in the 2006 edition of the International Race of Champions, IROC XXX. Kimmel was the first ever ARCA Racing Series driver to be assigned a seat in IROC.

That season, Kimmel placed seventh in points with a best finish of third in the first race of the four-race IROC season.

== Motorsports career results ==
=== Career summary ===
Season	Series	Team	Races	Wins	Top 5	Top 10	Poles	Points	Position
1990	ARCA Permatex SuperCar Series	Wallace Racing	2	0	0	0	0	N/A	76th
1991	ARCA Permatex SuperCar Series	Wallace Racing	5	0	1	4	0	930	28th
1992	ARCA Permatex SuperCar Series	Wallace Racing	21	0	6	12	0	4935	5th
1993	ARCA Hooters SuperCar Series	Shirley Racing	19	0	7	9	0	4480	5th
1994	ARCA Hooters SuperCar Series	Shirley Racing	21	1	10	15	1	5455	**2nd**
1995	NASCAR SuperTruck Series	AAG Racing	1	0	0	0	0	94	87th
1995	ARCA Hooters SuperCar Series	Shirley Racing	21	0	7	12	0	5005	5th
1996	NASCAR Craftsman Truck Series	Black Tip Racing	4	0	0	1	0	502	44th
1996	ARCA Bondo/Mar-Hyde Series	Steve Rauch Racing	15	3	10	12	1	3105	8th
1997	NASCAR Craftsman Truck Series	Wegner Motorsports	1	0	0	0	0	168	85th
1997	ARCA Bondo/Mar-Hyde Series	Steve Rauch Racing	22	1	13	18	1	5470	**2nd**
1998	NASCAR Winston Cup Series	Travis Carter Enterprises	1	0	0	0	0	70	65th
1998	NASCAR Craftsman Truck Series	Black Tip Racing	1	0	0	0	0	115	88th
1998	ARCA Bondo/Mar-Hyde Series	Clement Racing	22	9	16	19	3	6155	**1st**
1999	ARCA Bondo/Mar-Hyde Series	Clement Racing	21	3	12	14	1	5275	**2nd**
2000	ARCA Bondo/Mar-Hyde Series	Clement Racing	20	6	11	13	3	4980	**1st**
2001	NASCAR Busch Series	HighLine Performance Group	1	0	0	0	0	135	94th
2001	NASCAR Craftsman Truck Series	Sonntag Racing	1	0	0	0	0	109	97th
2001	NASCAR Winston West Series	Clement Racing	1	1	1	1	0	185	42nd
2001	ARCA Re/Max Series	Clement Racing	25	10	21	22	11	7080	**1st**
2002	NASCAR Winston Cup Series	Haas-Carter Motorsports	6	0	0	0	0	292	54th
2002	NASCAR Winston Cup Series	Larry Clement Racing	6	0	0	0	0	292	54th
2002	NASCAR Winston West Series	Clement Racing	1	0	0	0	0	97	53rd
2002	ARCA Re/Max Series	Clement Racing	22	10	18	19	6	6175	**1st**
2003	NASCAR Craftsman Truck Series	Spraker Racing Enterprises	1	0	0	0	0	79	117th
2003	ARCA Re/Max Series	Clement Racing	22	7	19	19	6	6145	**1st**
2004	NASCAR Craftsman Truck Series	K-Automotive Motorsports	3	0	0	1	0	344	50th
2004	ARCA Re/Max Series	Clement Racing	22	6	15	18	5	5930	**1st**
2005	ARCA Re/Max Series	Clement Racing	23	8	16	20	1	6000	**1st**
2006	International Race of Champions	ARCA	4	0	1	4	0	40	7th
2006	ARCA Re/Max Series	Clement Racing	23	4	13	15	2	5480	**1st**
2007	ARCA Re/Max Series	Clement Racing	23	3	11	17	0	5705	**1st**
2008	ARCA Re/Max Series	Kimmel Racing	21	3	11	14	1	5210	**2nd**
2009	ARCA Re/Max Series	Kimmel Racing	21	0	8	14	0	5260	**3rd**
2010	ARCA Racing Series	Kimmel Racing	20	0	7	14	1	4785	4th
2011	ARCA Racing Series	Kimmel Racing	19	0	3	17	0	4630	**3rd**
2012	ARCA Racing Series	ThorSport Racing	19	2	10	16	0	4810	**2nd**
2013	NASCAR Camping World Truck Series	ThorSport Racing	2	0	0	0	0	43	48th
2013	ARCA Racing Series	ThorSport Racing	21	4	15	21	4	5735	**1st**
2014	ARCA Racing Series	Win-Tron Racing	20	0	8	14	0	4725	4th
2015	ARCA Racing Series	Venturini Motorsports	11	0	4	5	2	2010	13th
2016	ARCA Racing Series	Team Stange Racing	2	0	1	1	0	370	66th
2016	ARCA Racing Series	Cunningham Motorsports	2	0	1	1	0	370	66th

=== NASCAR ===
(key) (Bold – Pole position awarded by qualifying time. Italics – Pole position earned by points standings or practice time. * – Most laps led.)

==== Nextel Cup Series ====
NASCAR Nextel Cup Series results
Year	Team	No.	Make	1	2	3	4	5	6	7	8	9	10	11	12	13	14	15	16	17	18	19	20	21	22	23	24	25	26	27	28	29	30	31	32	33	34	35	36	NNCC	Pts	Ref
1998	Travis Carter Enterprises	23	Ford	DAY	CAR	LVS	ATL	DAR	BRI	TEX	MAR	TAL	CAL	CLT	DOV	RCH	MCH	POC	SON	NHA	POC	IND	GLN	MCH; 31	BRI	NHA	DAR	RCH	DOV	MAR	CLT	TAL	DAY	PHO	CAR	ATL				65th	70	
2001	Larry Clement Racing	46	Ford	DAY	CAR	LVS	ATL	DAR	BRI	TEX	MAR	TAL	CAL	RCH	CLT	DOV	MCH	POC	SON	DAY	CHI	NHA	POC	IND	GLN	MCH	BRI	DAR	RCH	DOV	KAN	CLT; DNQ	MAR; DNQ	TAL	PHO	CAR	HOM	ATL; DNQ	NHA	N/A	0	
2002	Haas-Carter Motorsports	26	Ford	DAY	CAR	LVS	ATL	DAR	BRI	TEX; 33	MAR; 40	TAL; 35	CAL	RCH; 42	CLT; 26	DOV																								54th	292	
2002	Larry Clement Racing	46	Ford														POC; 43	MCH	SON	DAY	CHI	NHA	POC	IND	GLN	MCH	BRI	DAR	RCH	NHA	DOV	KAN	TAL	CLT	MAR					54th	292	
2002	Haas-Carter Motorsports	66	Ford																																	ATL; DNQ	CAR	PHO	HOM	54th	292	
2007	Fast Track Racing Enterprises	71	Ford	DAY; DNQ	CAL	LVS	ATL	BRI	MAR	TEX	PHO	TAL	RCH	DAR	CLT	DOV	POC	MCH	SON	NHA	DAY	CHI	IND	POC	GLN	MCH	BRI	CAL	RCH	NHA	DOV	KAN	TAL	CLT	MAR	ATL	TEX	PHO	HOM	71st	0	

===== Daytona 500 =====
Year	Team	Manufacturer	Start	Finish
2007	Fast Track Racing Enterprises	Ford	DNQ	

==== Busch Series ====
NASCAR Busch Series results
Year	Team	No.	Make	1	2	3	4	5	6	7	8	9	10	11	12	13	14	15	16	17	18	19	20	21	22	23	24	25	26	27	28	29	30	31	32	33	NBSC	Pts	Ref
2001	HighLine Performance Group	8	Chevy	DAY	CAR	LVS	ATL	DAR	BRI	TEX	NSH; 11	TAL	CAL	RCH	NHA	NZH	CLT	DOV	KEN	MLW	GLN	CHI	GTY	PPR	IRP	MCH	BRI	DAR	RCH	DOV	KAN	CLT	MEM	PHO	CAR	HOM	94th	135	

==== Camping World Truck Series ====
NASCAR Camping World Truck Series results
Year	Team	No.	Make	1	2	3	4	5	6	7	8	9	10	11	12	13	14	15	16	17	18	19	20	21	22	23	24	25	26	27	NCWTC	Pts	Ref
1995	AAG Racing	65	Chevy	PHO	TUS	SGS	MMR	POR	EVG	I70	LVL; 23	BRI	MLW	CNS	HPT	IRP	FLM	RCH	MAR	NWS	SON	MMR	PHO								87th	94	
1996	Black Tip Racing	00	Chevy	HOM; 9	PHO	POR	EVG	TUS	CNS	HPT; 30	BRI	NZH	MLW	LVL; 12	I70	IRP	FLM	GLN	NSV; 12	RCH	NHA	MAR	NWS	SON	MMR	PHO	LVS; DNQ				44th	502	
1997	Black Tip Racing	00	Chevy	WDW	TUS	HOM; DNQ	PHO	POR	EVG	I70	NHA	TEX	BRI	NZH	MLW	LVL	CNS	HPT	IRP	FLM	NSV; DNQ	GLN	RCH	MAR	SON	MMR	CAL	PHO			85th	168	
1997	Wegner Motorsports	68	Chevy																										LVS; 33		85th	168	
1998	Black Tip Racing	00	Chevy	WDW	HOM; 16	PHO	POR	EVG	I70	GLN	TEX	BRI	MLW	NZH	CAL	PPR	IRP	NHA	FLM	NSV	HPT	LVL	RCH	MEM	GTY	MAR	SON	MMR	PHO	LVS	88th	115	
1999	Black Tip Racing	69	Chevy	HOM	PHO	EVG	MMR	MAR	MEM	PPR	I70	BRI	TEX	PIR	GLN	MLW	NSV	NZH	MCH	NHA	IRP	GTY	HPT	RCH	LVS	LVL; DNQ	TEX	CAL			110th	70	
2001	Sonntag Racing	73	Chevy	DAY	HOM	MMR	MAR	GTY; 18	DAR	PPR	DOV	TEX	MEM	MLW	KAN	KEN	NHA	IRP	NSH	CIC	NZH	RCH	SBO	TEX	LVS	PHO	CAL				97th	109	
2003	Spraker Racing Enterprises	69	Ford	DAY	DAR	MMR	MAR	CLT	DOV	TEX	MEM	MLW	KAN	KEN	GTW	MCH	IRP	NSH	BRI	RCH	NHA	CAL	LVS	SBO	TEX	MAR	PHO	HOM; 28			117th	79	
2004	K-Automotive Motorsports	29	Ford	DAY; 8	ATL; 30	MAR	MFD	CLT; 13	DOV	TEX	MEM	MLW	KAN	KEN	GTW	MCH	IRP	NSH	BRI	RCH	NHA	LVS	CAL	TEX	MAR	PHO	DAR	HOM			50th	344	
2011	ThorSport Racing	44	Chevy	DAY	PHO	DAR	MAR	NSH	DOV	CLT	KAN	TEX	KEN	IOW	NSH	IRP	POC	MCH	BRI	ATL	CHI	NHA	KEN	LVS	TAL	MAR	TEX	HOM; DNQ			120th	0	
2013	ThorSport Racing	13	Toyota	DAY	MAR	CAR	KAN	CLT	DOV	TEX	KEN	IOW; 21	ELD	POC	MCH	BRI	MSP	IOW	CHI	LVS	TAL	MAR	TEX	PHO	HOM; 24						48th	43	

==== Winston West Series ====
NASCAR Winston West Series results
Year	Team	No.	Make	1	2	3	4	5	6	7	8	9	10	11	12	13	14	NWWSC	Pts	Ref
2001	Clement Racing	46	Chevy	PHO	LVS	TUS	MMR	CAL	IRW	LAG	KAN; 1*	EVG	CNS	IRW	RMR	LVS	IRW	42nd	185	
2002	Clement Racing	46	Ford	PHO	LVS	CAL	KAN; 22	EVG	IRW	S99	RMR	DCS	LVS					53rd	97	

=== ARCA Racing Series ===
(key) (Bold – Pole position awarded by qualifying time. Italics – Pole position earned by points standings or practice time. * – Most laps led.)

ARCA Racing Series results
Year	Team	No.	Make	1	2	3	4	5	6	7	8	9	10	11	12	13	14	15	16	17	18	19	20	21	22	23	24	25	ARSC	Pts	Ref
1990	Wallace Racing	02	Pontiac	DAY	ATL	KIL	TAL	FRS	POC	KIL	TOL; 19	HAG	POC	TAL	MCH	ISF	TOL	DSF	WIN	DEL; 18	ATL								76th	-	
1991	Wallace Racing	02	Pontiac	DAY	ATL	KIL	TAL	TOL; 4	FRS	POC	MCH	KIL; 6	FRS	DEL	POC	TAL	HPT; 7	MCH	ISF	TOL; 9	DSF; 26	TWS	ATL						28th	930	
1992	Wallace Racing	02	Pontiac	DAY; 16	FIF; 3	TWS; 4	TAL; 20	TOL; 19	KIL; 3	POC; 5	MCH; 34	FRS; 9	KIL; 10	NSH; 20	DEL; 21	POC; 10	HPT; 9	FRS; 6	ISF; 28	TOL; 3	DSF; 20	TWS; 8	SLM; 4	ATL; 6					5th	4935	
1993	Shirley Racing	02	Chevy	DAY; 6		TWS; 9	TAL; 31	KIL; 23				POC; 11	MCH; 2		POC; 12								ATL; 26						5th	4480	
1993	Shirley Racing	02	Pontiac		FIF; 11			CMS; 21	FRS; 17	TOL; 3				FRS; 3		KIL; 11	ISF; 5	DSF; 22	TOL; 5	SLM; 2	WIN; 4								5th	4480	
1994	Shirley Racing	02	Olds	DAY; 22	TAL; 7	FIF; 3	LVL; 2	KIL; 20	TOL; 1	FRS; 4		DMS; 2			KIL; 17	**FRS**; 4		I70; 16			TOL; 2	SLM; 2	WIN; 2						2nd	5455	
1994	Shirley Racing	02	Chevy								MCH; 3		POC; 7	POC; 38										ATL; 12					2nd	5455	
1994	Shirley Racing	02	Buick														INF; 6		ISF; 8	DSF; 6									2nd	5455	
1995	Shirley Racing	02	Olds	DAY; 6			FIF; 18	KIL; 5	FRS; 7		I80; 3	MCS; 23	FRS; 8		POC; 26	KIL; 2	FRS; 7	SBS; 19	LVL; 22	ISF; 35	DSF; 4	SLM; 3	WIN; 5						5th	5005	
1995	Shirley Racing	02	Chevy		ATL; 3					MCH; 7				POC; 27										ATL; 14					5th	5005	
1995	Shirley Racing	02	Pontiac			TAL; 21																							5th	5005	
1996	Steve Rauch Racing	02	Olds	DAY; 29	ATL																								8th	3105	
1996	Steve Rauch Racing	46	Pontiac			SLM; 7	TAL	FIF; 1	LVL; 2	CLT	CLT		FRS; 2	POC	MCH	**FRS**; 4	TOL; 1	POC	MCH		SBS; 10			KIL; 2	SLM; 2	WIN; 1	CLT	ATL	8th	3105	
1996	Steve Rauch Racing	46	Chevy									KIL; 2																	8th	3105	
1996	Steve Rauch Racing	02	Pontiac																	INF; 22		ISF; 31	DSF; 4						8th	3105	
1997	Steve Rauch Racing	46	Chevy	DAY; 6	**ATL**; 4		CLT; 7	CLT; 3	POC; 3	MCH; 4						POC; 2	MCH; 35	DSF; 8	GTW; 3			CLT; 33	TAL; 10	ISF; 4	**ATL**; 2				2nd	5470	
1997	Steve Rauch Racing	46	Pontiac			SLM; 3					SBS; 17	TOL; 25	KIL; 7	FRS; 3	MIN; 1					SLM; 2	WIN; 2								2nd	5470	
1998	Clement Racing	46	Chevy	DAY; 6	**ATL**; 3	SLM; 1	CLT; 1	MEM; 27	MCH; 1	POC; 2	SBS; 1	TOL; 1	PPR; 3	POC; 23	KIL; 1	FRS; 1	ISF; 2	ATL; 1	DSF; 3	**SLM**; 1	**TEX**; 28	WIN; 4	CLT; 6	TAL; 7	ATL; 3				1st	6155	
1999	Clement Racing	46	Chevy	DAY; 31	ATL; 4	SLM; 4	AND; 2	CLT; 20	MCH; 8	POC; 1	TOL; 28	SBS; 4	BLN; 1	POC; 2	**KIL**; 18	FRS; 3	FLM; 1	ISF; 2	WIN; 20	DSF; 22	SLM; 21	CLT; 6	TAL; 2	ATL; 3					2nd	5275	
2000	Clement Racing	46	Chevy	DAY; 33	SLM; 2	**AND**; 18	CLT; 29	**KIL**; 1	FRS; 1	MCH; 13	POC; 5	TOL; 1	KEN; 6	BLN; 2	POC; 3	WIN; 1	ISF; 1	KEN; 12	DSF; 1	**SLM**; 1	CLT; 7	TAL; 13	**ATL**; 24						1st	4980	
2001	Clement Racing	46	Chevy	DAY; 3		WIN; 11	**SLM**; 1							MEM; 3	GLN; 3					**ISF**; 1		DSF; 1	**SLM**; 1	**TOL**; 1	**BLN**; 3				1st	7080	
2001	Clement Racing	46	Ford		**NSH**; 2			GTY; 1	**KEN**; 1	CLT; 1	KAN; 2	MCH; 30	POC; 5			**KEN**; 1	MCH; 2	POC; 3	**NSH**; 1		CHI; 6					CLT; 3	TAL; 18	**ATL**; 3	1st	7080	
2002	Clement Racing	46	Ford	DAY; 3	ATL; 35	**NSH**; 1	**SLM**; 1	KEN; 1	**CLT**; 2	**KAN**; 1	**POC**; 9	MCH; 32	TOL; 1	SBO; 2	KEN; 2	BLN; 3	POC; 13	**NSH**; 1	**ISF**; 1	**WIN**; 1	DSF; 1	CHI; 3	**SLM**; 1	TAL; 3	**CLT**; 3				1st	6175	
2003	Clement Racing	46	Ford	DAY; 5	**ATL**; 5	NSH; 2	**SLM**; 2	TOL; 1	**KEN**; 2	**CLT**; 1	BLN; 1	**KAN**; 3	MCH; 3	LER; 1	POC; 2	POC; 3	**NSH**; 31	**ISF**; 1	WIN; 1	DSF; 5	**CHI**; 1	SLM; 22	TAL; 4	**CLT**; 21	SBO; 2				1st	6145	
2004	Clement Racing	46	Ford	DAY; 2	NSH; 4	**SLM**; 1	**KEN**; 20	TOL; 10	CLT; 3	KAN; 2	**POC**; 9	MCH; 10	SBO; 1	BLN; 1	**KEN**; 5	GTW; 2	POC; 2	**LER**; 1	NSH; 3	ISF; 2	TOL; 1	DSF; 1	CHI; 31	**SLM**; 23	**TAL**; 27				1st	5930	
2005	Clement Racing	46	Ford	DAY; 2	NSH; 7	SLM; 7	KEN; 1	**TOL**; 2	LAN; 4	MIL; 1	POC; 2	MCH; 1	KAN; 3	KEN; 4	BLN; 4	POC; 1	GTW; 7	LER; 1	NSH; 29	MCH; 19	ISF; 1	TOL; 1	DSF; 1	CHI; 9	SLM; 25	TAL; 5			1st	6000	
2006	Clement Racing	46	Ford	DAY; 10	NSH; 3	SLM; 25	WIN; 1	KEN; 28	**TOL**; 3	POC; 16	MCH; 19	KAN; 1	KEN; 2	BLN; 2	**POC**; 1	GTW; 10	NSH; 13	MCH; 27	ISF; 2	MIL; 3	TOL; 2	DSF; 31	CHI; 5	SLM; 2	TAL; 1	IOW; 32			1st	5480	
2007	Clement Racing	46	Ford	DAY; 5	USA; 7	NSH; 10	SLM; 22	KAN; 15	WIN; 3	KEN; 12	TOL; 4	IOW; 1	POC; 7	MCH; 13	BLN; 7	KEN; 10	POC; 25	NSH; 3	**ISF**; 1	MIL; 1	GTW; 12	DSF; 5	CHI; 6	SLM; 2	TAL; 2	TOL; 5			1st	5705	
2008	Kimmel Racing	44	Dodge	DAY; 5																									2nd	5210	
2008	Kimmel Racing	44	Ford		SLM; 4	IOW; 3	KAN; 20	CAR; 10	KEN; 13	TOL; 12	POC; 26	MCH; 3	CAY; 2	KEN; 4	BLN; 3	POC; 32	NSH; 19	**ISF**; 1	DSF; 1	CHI; 11	SLM; 1	NJE; 10	TAL; 6	TOL; 3					2nd	5210	
2009	Kimmel Racing	44	Ford	DAY; 11	SLM; 7	CAR; 11	TAL; 5	KEN; 5	TOL; 13	POC; 14	MCH; 12	MFD; 9	IOW; 7	KEN; 8	BLN; 12	POC; 5	ISF; 9	CHI; 5	TOL; 4	DSF; 2	NJE; 9	SLM; 4	KAN; 4	CAR; 2					3rd	5260	
2010	Kimmel Racing	44	Ford	DAY; 25	PBE; 12	SLM; 8	TEX; 6	TAL; 11	TOL; 4	POC; 5	MCH; 5	IOW; 6	MFD; 3	**POC**; 7	BLN; 5	NJE; 4	ISF; 12	CHI; 4	DSF; 15	TOL; 21	SLM; 9	KAN; 7	CAR; 6						4th	4785	
2011	Kimmel Racing	44	Ford	DAY; 10	TAL; 2	SLM; 3	TOL; 9	NJE; 6	CHI; 7	POC; 8	MCH; 9	WIN; 8	BLN; 8	IOW; 7	IRP; 12	POC; 10	ISF; 7	MAD; 6	DSF; 6	SLM; 5	KAN; 9	TOL; 21							3rd	4630	
2012	ThorSport Racing	44	Toyota	DAY; 23	MOB; 17	SLM; 2	TAL; 7	TOL; 2	ELK; 4	POC; 6	MCH; 7	WIN; 11	NJE; 7	IOW; 5	CHI; 3	IRP; 1	POC; 4	BLN; 2	ISF; 1	MAD; 9	SLM; 4	DSF; C	KAN; 6						2nd	4810	
2013	ThorSport Racing	44	Toyota	DAY; 4	MOB; 5	SLM; 6	TAL; 1	TOL; 3	ELK; 1	**POC**; 3	MCH; 3	ROA; 7	**WIN**; 1	CHI; 9	NJE; 5	**POC**; 2	BLN; 3	ISF; 4	MAD; 3	DSF; 7	IOW; 10	SLM; 3	**KEN**; 9	KAN; 1					1st	5735	
2014	Win-Tron Racing	44	Toyota	DAY; 2	MOB; 5	SLM; 3	TAL; 8	TOL; 14	NJE; 5	POC; 7	MCH; 7	ELK; 11	WIN; 9	CHI; 10	IRP; 3	POC; 20	BLN; 6	ISF; 4	MAD; 4	DSF; 3	SLM; 24	KEN; 11	KAN; 21						4th	4725	
2015	Venturini Motorsports	25	Toyota	DAY; 5	MOB	NSH	SLM		TOL; 11	NJE	POC; 11	**MCH**; 2	CHI; 5	WIN	IOW	IRP	**POC**; 15	BLN; 3	ISF; 13	DSF; 7	SLM; 23	KEN	KAN						13th	2010	
2015	Venturini Motorsports	15	Toyota					TAL; 14																					13th	2010	
2016	Team Stange Racing	46	Ford	DAY; 5	NSH	SLM	TAL	TOL	NJE	POC	MCH	MAD	WIN	IOW	IRP	POC	BLN	ISF	DSF										66th	370	
2016	Cunningham Motorsports	22	Ford																	SLM; 13	CHI	KEN	KAN						66th	370	

^{*} Season still in progress
^{1} Ineligible for series points

=== International Race of Champions ===
(key) (Bold – Pole position. * – Most laps led.)

International Race of Champions results
Year	Make	1	2	3	4	Pos.	Pts	Ref
2006	Pontiac	DAY; 3	TEX; 8	DAY; 8	ATL; 7	7th	40	

Sporting positions
Preceded by Tim Steele	ARCA Bondo/Mar-Hyde Series Champion; 1998	Succeeded by Bill Baird
Preceded by Bill Baird	ARCA Re/MAX Series Champion; 2000–2007	Succeeded by Justin Allgaier
Preceded by Chris Buescher	ARCA Racing Series Presented by Menards Champion; 2013	Succeeded by Mason Mitchell
