= Larry Clement =

American racing driver and team owner

- Born: July 22, 1945 (age 81); Fort Dodge, Iowa, U.S.

ARCA Menards Series career
- 2 races run over 1 year
- Best finish: N/A (1995)
- First race: 1995 Southern Illinois 250k (DuQuoin)
- Last race: 1995 Eddie Gilstrap Fall Classic (Salem)
Wins	Top tens	Poles
0	0	0
- Statistics up to date as of February 23, 2025.

Larry Clement (born July 22, 1945) is an American former professional stock car racing driver and team owner who competed in the ARCA Bondo/Mar-Hyde Series for two races in 1995, scoring a best finish of 29th at Salem Speedway. As team owner of Clement Racing, which competed in the series from 1993 to 2009, he won nine championships with Frank Kimmel as his driver.

== Motorsports results ==
=== ARCA Bondo/Mar-Hyde Series ===
(key) (Bold – Pole position awarded by qualifying time. Italics – Pole position earned by points standings or practice time. * – Most laps led. ** – All laps led.)

ARCA Bondo/Mar-Hyde Series results
Year	Team	No.	Make	1	2	3	4	5	6	7	8	9	10	11	12	13	14	15	16	17	18	19	20	21	ABMHSC	Pts	Ref
1995	Larry Clement Racing	96	Chevy	DAY	ATL	TAL	FIF	KIL	FRS	MCH	I80	MCS	FRS	POC	POC	KIL	FRS	SBS	LVL	ISF	DSF; 36	SLM; 29	WIN	ATL	N/A	0	
