= 1999 ARCA Bondo/Mar-Hyde Series =

47th American stock car series season

Seasons
- ← 1998 2000 →

The 1999 ARCA Bondo/Mar-Hyde Series was the 47th season of the ARCA Racing Series, a division of the Automobile Racing Club of America (ARCA). The season began on February 7, 1999, with the FirstPlus Financial 200 at Daytona International Speedway. The season ended with the Georgia Boot 400 at Atlanta Motor Speedway on November 20. Bill Baird won the drivers championship, and Ron Cox won the Rookie of the Year award.

== Schedule and winners ==
Date	Track	City	Event name	Pole winner	Race winner
February 13	Daytona International Speedway	Daytona Beach, Florida	FirstPlus Financial 200	Matt Hutter	Bobby Gerhart
March 15	Atlanta Motor Speedway	Hampton, Georgia	Johnson Industries/EasyCare Vehicle Service Contracts 300k	David Keith	Bill Baird
April 18	Salem Speedway	Washington Township, Indiana	Kentuckiana Ford Dealers 200	Bill Baird	Bill Baird
May 9	Anderson Speedway	Anderson, Indiana	Ed Martin Auto Group 300	Bill Baird	Ken Schrader
May 22	Lowe's Motor Speedway	Concord, North Carolina	EasyCare Vehicle Service Contracts 100	Mario Gosselin	Mario Gosselin
June 12	Michigan Speedway	Brooklyn, Michigan	Michigan ARCA 200	David Keith	David Keith
June 19	Pocono Raceway	Long Pond, Pennsylvania	Pocono ARCA 200	Bill Baird	Frank Kimmel
June 25	Toledo Speedway	Toledo, Ohio	Jasper Engines & Transmissions 150	Bill Baird	Blaise Alexander
June 26	Shady Bowl Speedway	De Graff, Ohio	Stapleton Automotive 150	Tracy Leslie	Bill Baird
July 10	Berlin Raceway	Marne, Michigan	Berlin ARCA 200	Scott Baker	Frank Kimmel
July 24	Pocono Raceway	Long Pond, Pennsylvania	Pepsi ARCA 200	Blaise Alexander	Blaise Alexander
July 30	Kil-Kare Raceway	Xenia Township, Ohio	Bondo/Mar-Hyde 150	Frank Kimmel	Robbie Pyle
July 31	Flat Rock Speedway	Flat Rock, Michigan	Jasper Engines & Transmissions 150	Bill Baird	Bill Baird
August 15	Flemington Speedway	Flemington, New Jersey	Summit Banks 250	Bill Baird	Frank Kimmel
August 22	Illinois State Fairgrounds	Springfield, Illinois	PAR-A-DICE 100	Bob Strait	Bill Baird
August 29	Winchester Speedway	Washington Township, Indiana	Winchester ARCA 200	Blaise Alexander	Tracy Leslie
September 5	DuQuoin State Fairgrounds	Du Quoin, Illinois	Southern Illinois 100	Billy Thomas	Jeff Finley
September 12	Salem Speedway	Washington Township, Indiana	Eddie Gilstrap Motors Fall Classic 200	Bill Baird	Ken Schrader
October 6	Lowe's Motor Speedway	Concord, North Carolina	EasyCare Vehicle Service Contracts 100	Mario Gosselin	Kirk Shelmerdine
October 16	Talladega Superspeedway	Lincoln, Alabama	Winn Dixie 300	Bob Strait	Bob Strait
November 20	Atlanta Motor Speedway	Hampton, Georgia	Georgia Boot 400	Derrick Gilchrist	Ron Hornaday Jr.

=== Drivers' championship ===
(key) Bold – Pole position awarded by time. Italics – Pole position set by final practice results or rainout. * – Most laps led. ** – All laps led.

Pos.	Driver	Races																					Points
Pos.	Driver	DAY	ATL	SLM	AND	CLT	MCH	POC	TOL	SBS	BLN	POC	KIL	FRS	FLM	ISF	WIN	DSF	SLM	CLT	TAL	ATL	Points
1	Bill Baird	8	1	**1**	**16**	11	7	3	**2***	1*	2*	3	22	**1***	3	1*	3*	2	**2**	5	18	7	5920
2	Frank Kimmel	31	4	4*	2	20	8	1*	28	4	1	2	**18**	3	1*	2	20	22	21	6	2	3	5275
3	Bobby Gerhart	1*	6	21	14	5	5	7	7	8	11	9	23	14	2	8	14	11	8	30	37	11	4890
4	Joe Cooksey	28	14	5	6	17	38	13	9	13	3	21	6	2	12	5	6	6	10	22	7	13	4855
5	Mark Gibson	37	5	11	8	34	14	5	5	2	16	13	13	13	8	3	16	34	4	18	36	12	4630
6	Andy Belmont	24	30	7	22	28	11	12	4	16	22	23	17	19	17	10	4	9	6	9	12	37	4450
7	Bob Schacht	16	35	6	4	23	31	4	3	22	24	22	12	5	7	15	23	15	11	35	4	28	4410
8	Ron Cox	DNQ	11	14	9	18	24	14	12	28	10	14	10	20	11	11	26	7	19	20	14	16	4335
9	Cavin Councilor	25	8	16	27	22	16	15	17	18	7	19	7	17	14	19	5	33	13	29	15	30	4250
10	Norm Benning	30	15	23	12	27	22	18	23	17	19	15	15	16	16	6	11	10	28	26	23	20	4135
11	Curt Piercy	20	22	20	15	33	27	26	21	27	4	18	20	15	30	12	22	8	23	DNQ	39	18	3525
12	Dill Whittymore	34	9	3	18	40	17	37	6	6	28	29	4	8	10	30	27	12	26	DNQ	22	14	3485
13	Tracy Leslie						10	10	10	**12**	5	8	25	7	4	13	1*	3	5	39	33	35	3355
14	Chuck Weber	DNQ	28	18	DNQ		25	20	19	21	18	25	21	12	20	18	24	18	17	DNQ	DNQ	32	2850
15	Jeff Finley			DNQ		15	39		8	5	9	4	5	6	5	9	17	1	3	DNQ	DNQ	10	2830
16	Blaise Alexander		3		3	14	2	11	1	25		**1***			9		**2**			4		26	2330
17	Bob Strait	22	7	2	5	21	3	23	22							**23**		5	25		**1***		2265
18	Mike Ciochetti	7	34	13	25	35	33	9	15	7	6	35	DNQ	DNQ						38	20	19	2260
19	Mark Voigt	17	13	31	DNQ	30					13					16	8	17	27		5		1700
20	Richard Hampton			25	11				27	9	15		16	9	26	27	15	19	14				1695
21	Mike Swaim Jr.	4	19*			6	18	17				5								7	8	9	1615
22	Bill Flowers	DNQ	16	DNQ	29	24		DNQ			DNQ	DNQ	DNQ	DNQ	19	DNQ	DNQ	16	22	DNQ	DNQ	DNQ	1450
23	Wes Russell			30	10				26	11	21		8	25		DNQ	7	14	29				1395
24	Randy Van Zant			17	23				25	20	14		9	10		34	31	29	16				1390
25	Eric Smith				DNQ				20	10	27		2	21		7		13	7				1385
26	Jimmy Kitchens	12	24				37	6	11	14	31	31								25			1370
27	David Ray Boggs	19	31	10	20	36	40	19	29			33			DNQ	32	29	DNQ	DNQ	DNQ	DNQ		1365
28	Kirk Shelmerdine	10	32			3	30	16				7								1*	26	41	1260
29	Mark Stahl	9	18			25	19	24				17			22					DNQ	21	25	1195
30	Mike Lorz			9	13				31	15	17					14	30	26					1065
31	Matt Hutter	**27**	12			13	4	2												31	35		1015
32	Dan Pardus	38	40	15		9	29		16			27								40	25	22	1000
33	Randy Churchill			24	28				18	3	25				15		9						1000
34	Darrell Lanigan		2			2	9					10								34		29	965
35	Mike Buckley			27	DNQ		DNQ				20		11	11	DNQ	DNQ	10		20				965
36	David Keith		**10**				**1***	8				40								12		36	925
37	Drew White	DNQ	38	DNQ	24	19	34	34			29	38			DNQ					DNQ	DNQ	DNQ	880
38	Roger Blackstock							28	DNQ		DNQ		3	23	29	DNQ	12		12				870
39	Jim Lamoreaux	DNQ	17	DNQ	21		DNQ	25				24			24	DNQ					13	DNQ	860
40	Rich Woodland Jr.		26			26	6	39				20								DNQ		8	780
41	Andy Hillenburg	35		8	26	39														24	6	31	765
42	James Hylton	Wth	DNQ				DNQ		DNQ	DNQ	30		27	24		22		24	18				730
43	Billy Venturini		21			10	36	35				34								37		6	715
44	Robbie Pyle									24			1*		6				15				700
45	Dwayne Leik	DNQ				29	21	DNQ				12								15		27	655
46	Scott Baker			26	19		DNQ		32		**8**						25						650
47	Jerry Hill	11					20	21				32			18								640
48	Tim Bainey Jr.	DNQ	DNQ	12	17	31	DNQ	40											9				630
49	Ken Schrader				1*												18		1*				615
50	Lance Hooper					8		30				6										24	585
51	Greg Sarff			DNQ	DNQ		DNQ			26			24	22			13						545
52	Dennis English			29	QL				24	DNQ						24	21	25					535
53	Brian Ross																		31	33	9	4	535
54	Christian Elder		27				15					28								41		15	525
55	Shawna Robinson	2				4															30		510
56	Bobby Hamilton Jr.	3				16	23	DNQ															505
57	George Glick			DNQ	DNQ				DNQ		23		26	DNQ	27	31	28	DNQ					500
58	Carl Long	40	39			37			13	DNQ		DNQ								14		DNQ	495
59	Mario Gosselin					**1***														**3**		DNQ	480
60	Ed Curtis	14				32		36				16								DNQ			455
61	A. J. Henriksen			DNQ					30	19	12						DNQ						435
62	Kevin Harvick																			2	3		435
63	Alan Bigelow	DNQ														20	19	20	DNQ				420
64	Ed Dixon															4		4					420
65	Doug Keller						12									17		32		DNQ			410
66	Mark Claussner						13													32		17	380
67	Dave Renner									DNQ			14	18			32						370
68	Joe Nott																			8	38	21	355
69	Dave Steele																			16	11	40	355
70	Bobby Dotter												19	4									355
71	Kevin Ray							DNQ				11									29	34	345
72	Bob Kelly	36					DNQ	31				DNQ									16		325
73	Todd Coon			22												26		27					315
74	Jerry Cook			19					14														295
75	Kenny Martin																			13		23	285
76	Steve Senerchia		DNQ		DNQ		DNQ	33							23					DNQ	DNQ		280
77	Jim Eubanks			DNQ					DNQ	DNQ						21		21					275
78	Brad Smith	DNQ	DNQ				DNQ					DNQ	28	26									260
79	Rick Skinner							38				30			25							DNQ	250
80	Ed Kennedy	18																			27		235
81	Ron Hornaday Jr.																					1*	235
82	Derrick Gilchrist																					**2**	235
83	Frog Hall		20	32			DNQ																225
84	Jon Herb															25		28				DNQ	220
85	Chad Chaffin																			11		38	215
86	Brian Conz	DNQ	23				DNQ													DNQ	DNQ		215
87	Jason Leffler																					5	205
88	Glen Morgan	5																					205
89	Ron Barfield Jr.	6																					200
90	Tim Mitchell							27			26								DNQ			DNQ	195
91	Brad Mueller				7																		195
92	Sammy Potashnick					7																	195
93	Billy Thomas															35		**23***					190
94	Robert Burroughs																				10		180
95	Rock Harris																			10			180
96	Walter Riley						35	32				DNQ											175
97	Darrell Basham			28															30				170
98	Ken Bouchard					12																	170
99	Pride Conner														13								165
100	John Metcalf	13																					165
101	Billy Meazell	DNQ	33				DNQ													DNQ	DNQ		165
102	Dean Roper															29		31					160
103	Doug Graham	15																					155
104	John Kinder	21	DNQ								DNQ												150
105	Ryan Zeck																			21		DNQ	150
106	Anthony Lazzaro																				17		145
107	J. R. Robbs																			17			145
108	Brad Webb		DNQ				DNQ													27			145
109	Travis McIntire						DNQ			23													140
110	Scott Stovall	23																					140
111	Dick Tracey	DNQ										DNQ			28						DNQ	DNQ	140
112	Shane Yoder	32																				33	135
113	Terry Cline																			19			135
114	C. W. Smith																				19		135
115	Jimmy Burns							29				DNQ								DNQ			135
116	Johnny Spradley	DNQ	29																			DNQ	135
117	Tate Bosworth	DNQ	25																				130
118	Art Seeger														21								125
119	Rick Beuchat						DNQ					26											125
120	Shane Doles	26						DNQ															125
121	Jeff Streeter	DNQ		DNQ			26																125
122	Mike Hamby						DNQ	22															120
123	Joe Buford																			23			115
124	Mike Harmon																				24		110
125	Nate Monteith																		24				110
126	David Romines						DNQ														31		100
127	Rick Markle		36				DNQ	DNQ													DNQ		100
128	Rick Groetsch	DNQ																	32				95
129	Rick Sheppard	DNQ					32																95
130	Matt Mullins					38														36			90
131	Rich Hayes															28		DNQ					90
132	Phil Massuch						28																90
133	Tyler Walker																			28			90
134	Gus Wasson																				28		90
135	Tim Horvath	33					DNQ																90
136	Josh Baltes	29																					85
137	Charlie Schaefer																	30					80
138	Tim Steele																				34		75
139	Doug Reid III																				32		70
140	James Tuggle															33		DNQ					65
141	David Adcock							DNQ				37											45
142	Clay Young		37																				45
143	Mike Borkowski																					39	35
144	Howard Rose											39											35
145	Joe Ruttman	39																					35
146	Randal Ritter																				40		30
147	Mike Dillard	41																					25
148	Donny Duchesne	DNQ																					
149	Donnie Neuenberger	DNQ																					
150	Mark Schulz	DNQ																					
151	Marc Brenner	DNQ																					
152	Russell Landrum	DNQ																					
153	Tony Altiere	DNQ	DNQ																				
154	Dale Kreider	DNQ																		DNQ			
155	Randy Cook		DNQ																				
156	Steve Senerchia		DNQ																		DNQ	DNQ	
157	Steve Young			DNQ								DNQ											
158	Rick Harrell						DNQ																
159	Gary Weinbroer						DNQ	DNQ															
160	Jim Hurlbert						DNQ															DNQ	
161	Loy Allen Jr.							DNQ															
162	Mike Zazula							DNQ															
163	Tom Eriksen							DNQ				DNQ											
164	Mike Potter							DNQ				DNQ											
165	Rick Romig											DNQ											
166	Jack Helget														DNQ								
167	Glenn Brewer															DNQ							
168	Anthony Hill																		DNQ				
169	Freddie Lewis																		DNQ				
170	Jon Kerley																			DNQ			
171	Andy Lombi																			DNQ		DNQ	
172	Mike Laughlin Jr.																				DNQ		
173	Michael McNesse																				DNQ		
174	Jimmy Morales																					DNQ	
175	Mike Dillon																				QL		
Pos.	Driver	DAY	ATL	SLM	AND	CLT	MCH	POC	TOL	SBS	BLN	POC	KIL	FRS	FLM	ISF	WIN	DSF	SLM	CLT	TAL	ATL	Points

== See also ==
- 1999 NASCAR Winston Cup Series
- 1999 NASCAR Busch Series
- 1999 NASCAR Craftsman Truck Series
- 1999 NASCAR Winston West Series
- 1999 NASCAR Goody's Dash Series
