= 1998 ARCA Bondo/Mar-Hyde Series =

46th American stock car series season

Seasons
- ← 1997 1999 →

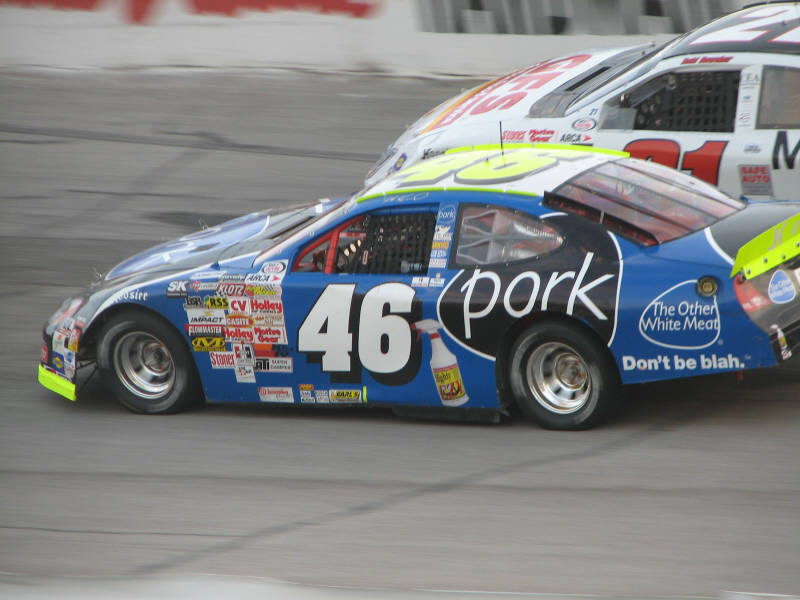
Frank Kimmel, driving the No. 46 car for Clement Racing (pictured in 2006), the 1998 ARCA champion. This was the first of his 10 championships in the series.

The 1998 ARCA Bondo/Mar-Hyde Series was the 46th season of the ARCA Racing Series, a division of the Automobile Racing Club of America (ARCA). The season began on February 8, 1998, with the FirstPlus Financial 200 at Daytona International Speedway, and ended on November 6, 1998, with the Winn Dixie 250K at Atlanta Motor Speedway.

Frank Kimmel was the series champion, winning nine races during the season, and this marked the first out of ten championships Kimmel would win in his ARCA career. Mark Gibson and Bob Strait were the runners-up in the final championship standings. Bill Baird won Rookie of the Year honors. Defending champion Tim Steele entered only six races, winning four of those races, but otherwise spent most of the season recovering from injuries suffered in a racing crash the previous season. The season also saw the brief but impactful appearance of fourth-generation driver Adam Petty, who won the first race he entered at Round 23 at Charlotte.

== Schedule and winners ==
Date	Track	City	Event name	Pole winner	Race winner
February 8	Daytona International Speedway	Daytona Beach, Florida	FirstPlus Financial 200	Bill Baird	Kenny Irwin Jr.
March 6	Atlanta Motor Speedway	Hampton, Georgia	Johnson Industries/EasyCare Vehicle Services 300k	Frank Kimmel	Kirk Shelmerdine
April 19	Salem Speedway	Washington Township, Indiana	Kentuckiana Ford Dealers 200	Bob Strait	Frank Kimmel
May 16	Lowe's Motor Speedway	Concord, North Carolina	EasyCare Vehicle Service Contracts 100	Gary Laton	Frank Kimmel
June 7	Memphis Motorsports Park	Memphis, Tennessee	Memphis ARCA 100	Bob Schacht	Bob Schacht
June 13	Michigan Speedway	Brooklyn, Michigan	Jasper Enginees 200	Bobby Gerhart	Frank Kimmel
June 20	Pocono Raceway	Long Pond, Pennsylvania	Mountain Dew 400K	Mike Ciochetti	Tim Steele
June 27	Shady Bowl Speedway	De Graff, Ohio	McDonald's 150	Jeff Finley	Frank Kimmel
June 28	Toledo Speedway	Toledo, Ohio	Toledo ARCA 150	Tim Steele	Frank Kimmel
July 12	Pikes Peak International Raceway	Fountain, Colorado	Pikes Peak ARCA 150	Tim Steele	Tim Steele
July 25	Pocono Raceway	Long Pond, Pennsylvania	ARCA Pepsi 400K	Tim Steele	Tim Steele
July 31	Kil-Kare Raceway	Xenia Township, Ohio	Bondo/Mar-Hyde 150	Eric Smith	Frank Kimmel
August 1	Flat Rock Speedway	Flat Rock, Michigan	Flat Rock ARCA 150	Rick Groetsch	Frank Kimmel
August 23	Illinois State Fairgrounds	Springfield, Illinois	Allen Crowe Memorial 100	Ken Schrader	Ken Schrader
August 28	Atlanta Motor Speedway	Hampton, Georgia	Georgia Power 200	Tim Steele	Frank Kimmel
September 6	DuQuoin State Fairgrounds	Du Quoin, Illinois	Southern Illinois 100	Bill Baird	Billy Thomas
September 13	Salem Speedway	Washington Township, Indiana	Eddie Gilstrap 200	Frank Kimmel	Frank Kimmel
September 19	Texas Motor Speedway	Fort Worth, Texas	Z-Max 250	Frank Kimmel	Mark Gibson
September 26	Winchester Speedway	White River Township, Randolph County, Indiana	Snap On 150	Bob Strait	Bob Strait
September 30	Charlotte Motor Speedway	Concord, North Carolina	EasyCare Certified 100	Darrell Lanigan	Adam Petty
October 10	Talladega Superspeedway	Lincoln, Alabama	Winn Dixie 300	Tim Steele	Tim Steele
November 6	Atlanta Motor Speedway	Hampton, Georgia	Winn Dixie 250K	Bobby Hamilton Jr.	Mike Swaim Jr.

=== Drivers' championship ===
(key) Bold – Pole position awarded by time. Italics – Pole position set by final practice results or rainout. * – Most laps led. ** – All laps led.

Pos.	Driver	Races																						Points
Pos.	Driver	DAY	ATL	SLM	CLT	MEM	MCH	POC	SBS	TOL	PPR	POC	KIL	FRS	ISF	ATL	DSF	SLM	TEX	WIN	CLT	TAL	ATL	Points
1	Frank Kimmel	6	**3**	1*	1	27	1	2	1*	1	3	23	1*	1*	2	1	3	**1***	**28**	4*	6	7	3	6155
2	Mark Gibson	10	5*	2	5	3	9	20	5	17	7	2	18	5	3	3	4	19	1*	28	4	37	7	5455
3	Bob Strait	7	7	**24**	17	4	13	6	3	4	10	21	3	2	12	12	30	7	6	**1**	21	17	31	5245
4	Bill Baird	**22**	34	17	38	5	8	10	11	27	2	3	11	14	22	23	**2**	2	2	25	35	10	11	4880
5	Andy Belmont	12	2	27	8	10	32	27	14	11	14	17	5	20	37	18	7	28	9	2	16	11	13	4690
6	Jeff Finley	21	11	8	18	2	3	4	**2**	5	8	31	21	3	23	2	23	22	34	DNQ			5	4350
7	Curt Piercy	32	27	23	26	18	36	15	23	18	23	26	24	13	8	20	9	13	17	29	23	19	12	4095
8	Norm Benning	29	12	14	29	8	39	32	15	19	24	36	20	16	7	21	12	16	13	14	38	23	32	4035
9	David Ray Boggs	31	30	12	32	14	17	34	19	13	13	8	8	19	39	25	34	25	27	9	39	26	26	3860
10	Brian Conz	30	36	13	24	34	19	25	20	24	31	15	23	23	28	22	20	21	12	16	26	21	27	3785
11	Joe Cooksey			10	28	9	27		12	16	15		6	9	9	19	8	9	8	3	18	18	16	3550
12	Chuck Weber		24	18	27	29		19	16	22	19	14	15		13	37	15	23	20	11	24	22	25	3510
13	Josh Baltes	34	33	3	13	7	26	24	10	14	9		19	27		13		27		DNQ				2520
14	Bobby Gerhart	8	31		21	6	**4**	17			27	22			36	9	29		4		11	30	10	2425
15	Kirk Shelmerdine	15	1		2*		7*	3				13				26			25		15	27	9	2175
16	Mike Ciochetti	13	22		3		5	**28**			11	19				10			3		27	16	35	2145
17	Cavin Councilor	Wth	28	7	20	33	40		27		17	27	7	10		29		12	DNQ	7	33	DNQ	30	2070
18	Mark Voigt			11		25	20	29	6	23	32		26	25	34		10	10		12				2000
19	Wes Russell			20		26			13	26			9	7	11		14	5		21				1595
20	Mark Stahl	DNQ	18				28	36				7				14			11		20	8	14	1590
21	Richard Hampton			28		11			8	30			14	11	16		16	26	22	18	DNQ			
22	Eric Smith			6		28			25	20			**2**	26	27		6	30		22				
23	Jim Lamoreaux	DNQ	20				25	16			22	12	DNQ			40			16		25	24	20	
24	Andy Hillenburg	3	8		14		2	8				29				32	DNQ				10	9	DNQ	
25	Roger Blackstock				34	12			7	9			28	12	25		11	DNQ		15				
26	Rich Woodland Jr.				9		37	7			5	5				11			24		9			
27	Glen Morgan	37			37		21	11				35							7		17	13		
28	Drew White	DNQ		31	39	35	34	35			33		DNQ			34			DNQ		DNQ	DNQ	36	
29	Gary Laton	19	6		**10**		10	12			20	28												
30	Jimmy Kitchens	16	15		40							33									12	12	6	
31	Rick Sheppard	DNQ	35					14		8		6		17		24						35		
32	Jerry Middleton			15					22	32			22	22				33		27				
33	Tim Steele							1*		**2***	**1***	**1***				**30***						**1***		
34	Bob Schacht					**1***	23	26				9						3		6				
35	Dill Whittymore			21						6	4							6		19		31		
36	Mike Lorz			26		16			21				DNQ		10		18			23				
37	Mike Buckley					22			9	25			13	15	DNQ		32			DNQ				
38	Dennis English			33		20									21		19	15		24				
39	Tim Bainey Jr.		17					30				20	10	21		39					DNQ			
40	Russell Landrum	38	21				18									15			Wth			40	17	
41	James Hylton			22				37			35			24					30		DNQ		37	
42	Rick Grotesch			5					4	7				**6**				4						
43	Mike Swaim Jr.		14		6											5					7		1	
44	Bobby Hamilton Jr.							5				25									3	5	**2***	
45	Darrell Lanigan		4		7		12														**30***		4	
46	Randy Van Zant			9		13			17	15			12											
47	Kenny Martin	39	13		12											6						14		
48	John Kinder	27			15						DNQ					8					13		23	
49	Dan Pardus	18		4			29											32				3		
50	Harris DeVane	14	16													4						28	28	
51	Todd Coon			19		24				31					26		22			DNQ				
52	Kenny Brown					30				DNQ					15		33	18	31					
53	Dave Weltmeyer								28	3			4	8										
54	Randy Churchill									12				4				11		17				
55	Dave LaDuke									21				18	17			8		DNQ				
56	Scott Baker	DNQ		DNQ			22								20			24		5				
57	Billy Venturini	9	26	25	16																DNQ			
58	Alan Bigelow					19					26						24			10				
59	Steve Stevenson			16		15				10					40									
60	Chad Coleman	17			19							10				38								
61	Rick Harrell		25				35									16							15	
62	Greg Sarff					21			18	29			25											
63	Dwayne Leik				35							4									31		38	
64	Sammy Potashnick	DNQ	10		36	32										35								
65	Scotty Sands												16		38		35	31		QL				
66	Marc Brenner				22		33				36											38		
67	Ed Curtis	33			33											36					28			
68	Ron Barfield Jr.	5			4		16																	
69	Mark Thompson	4	32																			4		
70	Matt Mullins				31											7					8			
71	Rick Skinner							18				11											22	
72	Dale Kreider	DNQ										16							10			32		
73	Travis McIntire								24				DNQ					14		20				
74	Frog Hall	DNQ					31				16								21					
75	Jerry Hill						15	33				24												
76	Charlie Schaefer														32		21	20						
77	Gary Weinbroer	DNQ					24	21				34												
78	Howard Rose															17			33		32			
79	Randy Cook		29			23							DNQ						32			DNQ	DNQ	
80	Johnny Spradley	DNQ																	18		34		33	
81	Tim Mitchell							38			29								29					
82	Mike Wallace	2																			2			
83	Bob Hill														4		5							
84	Gus Wasson																		5		5			
85	Kevin Ray																				DNQ	6	8	
86	Ed Berrier	11	9																					
87	Bobby Dotter										6											15		
88	Butch Garner														6		17							
89	Brad Mueller																	17		13				
90	Adam Petty																				1	29		
91	Gary Clark							13			18													
92	Eric Jones																			8			24	
93	Jimmy Kite		19				14																	
94	Dicky Williamson																		15			20		
95	Carl Long				23																14			
96	Tony Schwengel														14		27							
97	Mike Zazula							23				18												
98	Mike Fry														30		13							
99	Blaise Alexander	35						9																
100	Charlie Sentman														19		26							
101	Phillip Young															27							18	
102	Rich Hayes														18		28							
103	Ron Cox															28					19	DNQ		
104	Rob Julian	DNQ		32									17					DNQ						
105	Ken Rowley														24		25							
106	Brad Smith	DNQ						31												19	DNQ	DNQ		
107	Doug Keller						30				21												DNQ	
108	Bob Wiles												27							26				
109	George Glick								26								31			DNQ				
110	Curt Dickle									DNQ			DNQ	28	31									
111	Bill Flowers																				22	DNQ	39	
112	Ricky Logan										28					33								
113	Greg Usher	DNQ			30		38																	
114	Tom Eriksen											30									40			
115	Tony Altiere	DNQ	39																DNQ			DNQ	34	
116	Kenny Irwin Jr.	1*																						
117	Ken Schrader														**1***									
118	Billy Thomas																1*							
119	Matt Hutter																					2		
120	Brad Dubil														5		DNQ							
121	Dennis Berry						6																	
122	Lance Hooper				11																			
123	Shane Yoder						11																	
124	Mike Snow										12													
125	Mark Schulz																		14					
126	David Adcock					17																		
127	Tate Bosworth																				DNQ		19	
128	Donnie Moran	20																						
129	Andy Lombi																				DNQ		21	
130	Larry Schwartz							22																
131	Billy Meazell	DNQ																	23		DNQ		DNQ	
132	Randal Ritter	23																						
133	Stephen Sawyer		23																					
134	Glenn Brewer	24																				DNQ		
135	Tim Fedewa																					25		
136	Adam Larson	25																						
137	Alan Markovitz										25													
138	Ted Smokstad	DNQ			25																			
139	Neil Cunningham	26																						
140	Eric Norris																		26					
141	Rick Eckert	28																						
142	David Simko									28														
143	John Gill			29																				
144	A. J. Henriksen																	29		DNQ				
145	John Linville																				29			
146	Dean Roper														29									
147	Fred Zack	DNQ																			DNQ		29	
148	Bob Howard										30													
149	Toby Massie			30																				
150	Bob Dodds															31								
151	Jason Weatherton			DNQ		31																		
152	David Murry											32												
153	Jon Herb														33								DNQ	
154	Doug Reid III																					33		
155	Thad Coleman																					34		
156	Vic Walker										34													
157	Warren Elgin														35									
158	Scott Heineman																		35					
159	Craig Butts	36																						
160	Gene Fox					36																		
161	Jon Kerley																				36			
162	Michael McNesse	DNQ																				36		
163	Greg Miller																		36					
164	Bow Carpenter										37													
165	Jim Hurlbert	DNQ										37											DNQ	
166	Mike Jaynes																				37			
167	Dick Tracey	DNQ	37																					
168	Art Cross		38																					
169	Randy Roush	QL									38													
170	Mike Harmon																					39		
171	Christian Elder																						40	
172	Bob Kelly	DNQ	40																					
173	Joel White	40																						
174	Mike Osgar						41																	
	Doc Watson	DNQ																						
	Randy Nobach	DNQ																						
	Tom Bigelow	DNQ																						
	Steve Bramley											DNQ												
	Clayton Smith																DNQ							
	Jackie Burke																		DNQ					
	Michael Reed																		DNQ					
	Steve Miller																				DNQ			
	Terry Cline																				DNQ			
	Doug Ehret																				DNQ			
Pos.	Driver	DAY	ATL	SLM	CLT	MEM	MCH	POC	SBS	TOL	PPR	POC	KIL	FRS	ISF	ATL	DSF	SLM	TEX	WIN	CLT	TAL	ATL	Points

== See also ==
- 1998 NASCAR Winston Cup Series
- 1998 NASCAR Busch Series
- 1998 NASCAR Craftsman Truck Series
- 1998 NASCAR Winston West Series
- 1998 NASCAR Goody's Dash Series
