= Billy Venturini =

American racing driver and team owner (born 1976)

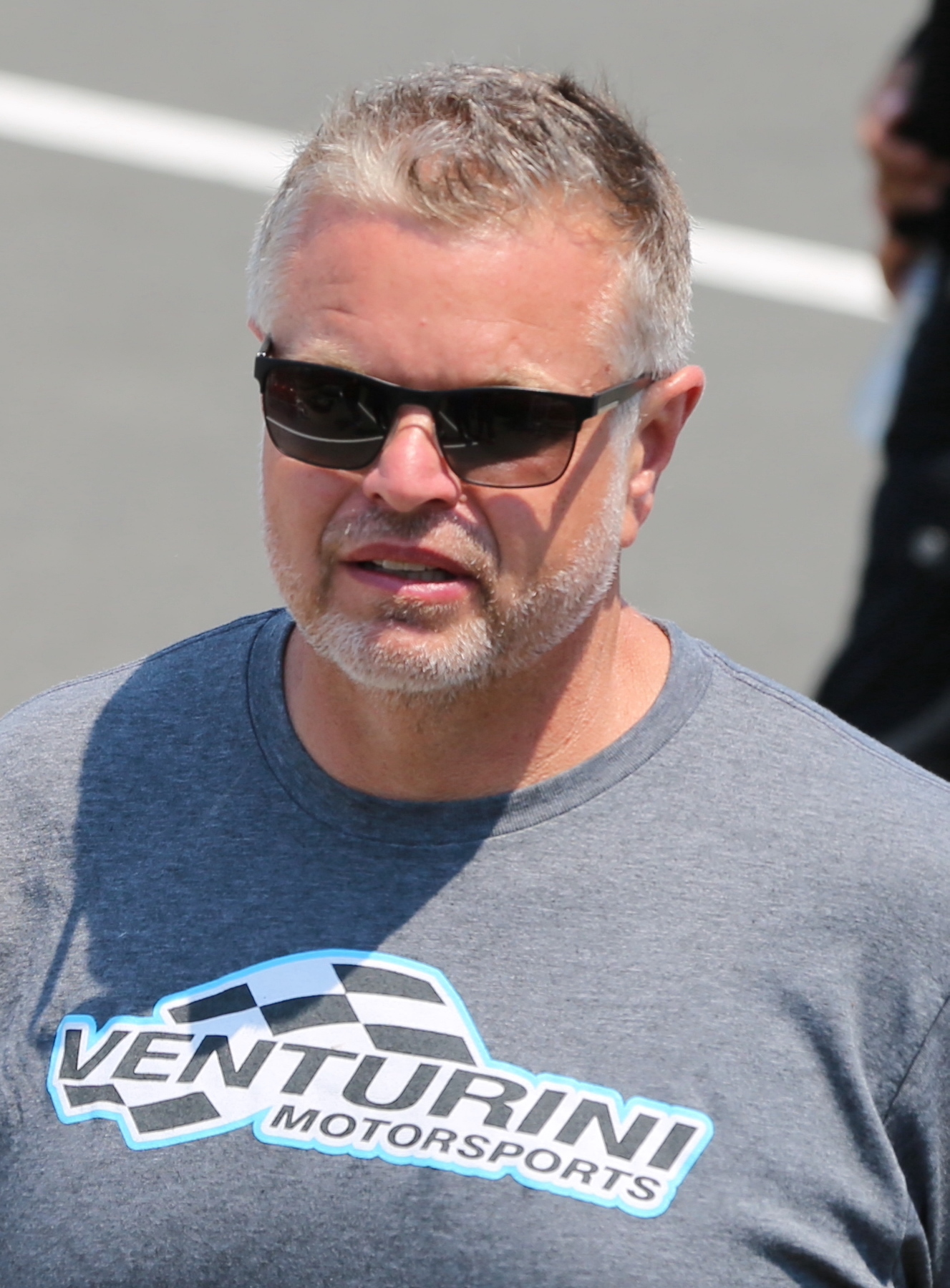
- Venturini at Sonoma Raceway in 2025
- Born: William Venturini; April 7, 1976 (age 50); Chicago, Illinois, U.S.

ARCA Menards Series career
- 161 races run over 14 years
- Best finish: 3rd (2006)
- First race: 1994 Louisville 250 (Louisville)
- Last race: 2007 ARCA Re/Max 250 (Talladega)
- First win: 2006 Kentuckiana Ford Dealers ARCA 200 (Salem)
Wins	Top tens	Poles
1	75	1

ARCA Menards Series East career
- 1 race run over 1 year
- First race: 2023 Dutch Boy 150 (Flat Rock)
Wins	Top tens	Poles
0	1	0
- Statistics up to date as of May 20, 2023.

William Venturini Jr (born April 7, 1976) is an American professional stock car racing driver and team owner. He is the former co-owner Venturini Motorsports, a racing team that competed in the ARCA Menards Series, along with his father, Bill. As a driver, he last competed part-time in the ARCA Menards Series East, driving the No. 20 Toyota Camry for Venturini Motorsports. He previously competed in the ARCA Re/Max Series either full-time or part-time from 1994 through 2007, mainly driving for the same team.

== Racing career ==
=== ARCA ===
Venturini made his ARCA Series debut at Louisville Motor Speedway in 1994, when he was only eighteen-years old. His race would end early after oil pressure issues on lap 41. He ran four more races that year, earning his first top five at Toledo Speedway in September. He drove a race for Bill Egbert in the season finale at Atlanta Motor Speedway, finishing 32nd due to a driveshaft issue. In 1997, he joined Ed Rensi Racing to run a nine-race schedule, earning his best finish of fifth at Charlotte Motor Speedway. He returned next season, earning a top ten at Daytona. He returned to his family team, and continued running part-time in the series from 1999 through 2001. In 2002, he ran for the full season, earning one top five and nine top tens, finishing sixth in the final standings. He would respectively finish inside the top-five in point standings for the next two years, along with earning a pole at Lake Erie Speedway in 2003. He went back to a part-time schedule in 2005, before returning full-time in 2006. He would capture his only win that year at Salem Speedway, after dominating the race by leading 95 laps. He would finish a career best third in points. 2007 would end up being his final year as a driver. He ran eight races that year, earning a top five at Talladega Superspeedway, which would also be his final race. After the 2007 season, Venturini decided to retire as a driver, and focus on operating his racing team with his father.

On May 6, 2023, during an interview with motorsport news website Frontstretch, Venturini revealed that he would return to the driver's seat for the first time in sixteen years, running the ARCA Menards Series East race at Flat Rock Speedway. He would team with fellow driver and former driver for Venturini Brennan Poole as a spotter, and the pairing wound up earning a fourth-place finish. It was his first start in the East Series.

=== NASCAR Truck Series ===
Venturini attempted to make his NASCAR Craftsman Truck Series debut in 1999, racing at Martinsville Speedway for his family team, but would fail to qualify for the event. He would attempt to run the next race, but would once again fail to qualify. He attempted a race at Martinsville a year later, but also failed to qualify. He has not made a start in the series since then.

== Post-racing career ==
After retiring from driving in 2007, Venturini decided to turn his family team into a driver development program. Venturini would later be known for helping his team become one of the most premier driver development programs in the ARCA circuit, collecting over 50 wins in the series, including a championship in 2019. That same year, Venturini won the Cometic Crew Chief of the Year award. In 2012, Venturini, along with his family, were inducted into the National Italian American Sports Hall of Fame (NIASHF). In 2022, Venturini received media attention during the ARCA race at Kansas in May. Venturini was serving as the crew chief for Corey Heim in the race, since the original crew chief, Shannon Rursch, was attending his daughter's college graduation that weekend. On lap 57 of the race, Drew Dollar made contact with Heim exiting turn 4, causing both of them to hit the outside wall, and spin through the infield grass. During an interview with FS1 reporter Kate Osborne, Venturini showed his displeasure with Dollar, stating that "Drew wrecks all your shit when he's driving for you, and then he wrecks it all when he's racing against you." He would also state that Dollar was a "pure lack of talent." Dollar reacted to the interview a day later, by tweeting out Venturini's racing stats on Racing-Reference, with the caption saying "Guess it took this guy about 14 years to figure out he didn't need to be a race car driver."

== Personal life ==
Venturini is married to Emily, and they have twin sons, Luke and Max. His younger sister, Wendy Venturini, is currently a pit reporter for Performance Racing Network (PRN).

== Motorsports career results ==
=== NASCAR ===
(key) (Bold – Pole position awarded by qualifying time. Italics – Pole position earned by points standings or practice time. * – Most laps led.)

==== Craftsman Truck Series ====
NASCAR Craftsman Truck Series results
Year	Team	No.	Make	1	2	3	4	5	6	7	8	9	10	11	12	13	14	15	16	17	18	19	20	21	22	23	24	25	NCTC	Pts	Ref
1999	Venturini Motorsports	35	Chevy	HOM	PHO	EVG	MMR	MAR; DNQ	MEM; DNQ	PPR	I70	BRI	TEX	PIR	GLN	MLW	NSV	NZH	MCH	NHA	IRP	GTY	HPT	RCH	LVS	LVL	TEX	CAL	98th	–	
2000	Venturini Motorsports	83	Chevy	DAY	HOM	PHO	MMR	MAR; DNQ	PIR	GTY	MEM	PPR	EVG	TEX	KEN	GLN	MLW	NHA	NZH	MCH	IRP	NSV	CIC	RCH	DOV	TEX	CAL		118th	–	

=== ARCA Re/Max Series ===
(key) (Bold – Pole position awarded by qualifying time. Italics – Pole position earned by points standings or practice time. * – Most laps led.)

ARCA Re/Max Series results
Year	Team	No.	Make	1	2	3	4	5	6	7	8	9	10	11	12	13	14	15	16	17	18	19	20	21	22	23	24	25	ARSC	Pts	Ref
1994	Venturini Motorsports	35	Chevy	DAY	TAL	FIF	LVL; 26	KIL	TOL; 14	FRS	MCH	DMS	POC	POC	KIL	FRS	INF	I70; 14	ISF	DSF	TOL; 4	SLM	WIN						NA	0	
1994	Bill Egbert	62	Chevy																					ATL; 32					NA	0	
1995	Venturini Motorsports	25	Chevy	DAY	ATL	TAL	FIF; 5	KIL; 26	FRS	MCH	I80	MCS	FRS	POC; 31	POC	KIL	FRS	SBS	LVL; 18	ISF	DSF	SLM	WIN	ATL; DNQ					NA	0	
1996	Venturini Motorsports	25	Chevy	DAY	ATL	SLM	TAL	FIF	LVL	CLT; 28	CLT	KIL	FRS	POC	MCH	FRS	TOL	POC	MCH	IND	SBS	ISF	DQN	KIL	SLM	WIN	CLT; 31	ATL	NA	0	
1997	Venturini Motorsports	25	Chevy	DAY	ATL	SLM	CLT; 38																						20th	1640	
1997	Ed Rensi Racing	83	Chevy					CLT	POC	MCH	SBS; 6	TOL; 13	KIL; 22	FRS	WVS	POC	MCH; 15	DQN	GTW; 29	SLM; 20	WIN	CLT; 5	TAL	ISF; 10	ATL; 29				20th	1640	
1998	Ed Rensi Racing	83	Chevy	DAY; 9	ATL; 26	SLM; 25	CLT; 16	MEM	MCH	POC	SBS	TOL	PIK	POC	KIL	FRS	ISF	ATL	DQN	SLM	TEX	WIN							NA	0	
1998	Venturini Motorsports	25	Chevy																				CLT; DNQ	TAL	ATL				NA	0	
1999	Venturini Motorsports	25	Chevy	DAY	ATL; 21	SLM	AND	CLT; 10	MCH; 36	POC; 35	TOL	SBS	BER	POC; 34	KIL	FRS	FLM	ISF	WIN	DQN	SLM	CLT; 37	TAL	ATL; 6					43rd	715	
2000	Venturini Motorsports	25	Chevy	DAY	SLM	AND	CLT; 11	KIL	FRS	MCH; 10	POC; 16	TOL	KEN; 11	BER	POC; 7	WIN	ISF	KEN; 4	DQN	SLM	CLT; 36	TAL	ATL; 9						28th	1320	
2001	Venturini Motorsports	25	Chevy	DAY; 23	NSH; 26	WIN; 4	SLM; 23	GTW; 8	KEN; 13	CLT; 23	KAN	MCH	POC	MEM; 30	GLN	KEN; 3	MCH	POC; 20	NSH; 7	ISF	CHI; 4	DQN	SLM	TOL	BER	CLT; 4	TAL; 33	ATL; 36	18th	2445	
2002	Venturini Motorsports	25	Pontiac	DAY; 29																				TAL; 10					6th	4685	
2002	Venturini Motorsports	25	Chevy		ATL; 7	NSH; 26	SLM; 20	KEN; 10	CLT; 31	KAN; 11	POC; 6	MCH; 19	TOL; 7	SBO; 3	KEN; 12	BER; 11	POC; 25	NSH; 8	ISF; 9	WIN; 24	DQN; 13	CHI; 8	SLM; 26		CLT; 22				6th	4685	
2003	Venturini Motorsports	25	Pontiac	DAY; 3			SLM; 3				BER; 4*			**LER**; 2*					WIN; 9			SLM; 20	TAL; 2		SBO; 29				5th	4945	
2003	Venturini Motorsports	25	Chevy		ATL; 9	NSH; 16		TOL; 5	KEN; 10	CLT; 17		KAN; 23	MCH; 38		POC; 10	POC; 8	NSH; 27	ISF; 8		DQN; 16	TOL; 26			CLT; 9					5th	4945	
2004	Venturini Motorsports	25	Pontiac	DAY; 3																					TAL; 24				4th	5015	
2004	Venturini Motorsports	25	Chevy		NSH; 12	SLM; 3	KEN; 2	TOL; 12	CLT; 20	KAN; 6	POC; 4	MCH; 30	SBO; 3	BER; 7	KEN; 23	GTW; 6	POC; 8	LER; 4	NSH; 29	ISF; 8	TOL; 28	DQN; 13	CHI; 6	SLM; 20					4th	5015	
2005	Venturini Motorsports	25	Chevy	DAY; 14	NSH	SLM	KEN	TOL	LNS	MLW	POC	MCH	KAN						NSH	MCH	ISF	TOL; 3	DQN; 8	CHI; 8	SLM; 4	TAL; 28			28th	1700	
2005	Venturini Motorsports	15	Chevy											KEN; 32	BER; 27	POC	GTW	LER; 2											28th	1700	
2006	Venturini Motorsports	25	Chevy	DAY; 7	NSH; 12	SLM; 1*	WIN; 28	KEN; 9	TOL; 11	POC; 34	MCH; 12	KAN; 35	KEN; 25	BER; 30	POC; 7	GTW; 17	NSH; 4	MCH; 7	ISF; 9	MLW; 9	TOL; 9	DQN; 9	CHI; 6	SLM; 5	TAL; 30	IOW; 9			3rd	4950	
2007	Venturini Motorsports	25	Chevy	DAY; 28	USA; 14	NSH; 19	SLM; 9	KAN	WIN	KEN	TOL; 10	IOW	POC	MCH	BER	KEN	POC	NSH	ISF	MLW	GTW	DQN; 8	CHI; 10	SLM					31st	1355	
2007	Venturini Motorsports	15	Chevy																						TAL; 5	TOL			31st	1355	

==== ARCA Menards Series East ====
ARCA Menards Series East results
Year	Team	No.	Make	1	2	3	4	5	6	7	8	AMSEC	Pts	Ref
2023	Venturini Motorsports	25	Toyota	FIF	DOV	NSV	FRS; 4	IOW	IRP	MLW	BRI	30th	40	

^{*} Season still in progress
