= Mark Gibson =

American racing driver (born 1957)

- Born: August 14, 1957 (age 69); Richlands, Virginia, U.S.
- Awards: 1986 ARCA Racing Series Rookie of the Year

NASCAR Cup Series career
- 2 races run over 2 years
- Best finish: 91st (1989)
- First race: 1987 Delaware 500 (Dover)
- Last race: 1989 Pepsi 400 (Daytona)
| Wins | Top tens | Poles |
|---|---|---|
| 0 | 0 | 0 |

NASCAR O'Reilly Auto Parts Series career
- 7 races run over 3 years
- Best finish: 76th (1982)
- First race: 1982 Goody's 300 (Daytona)
- Last race: 1984 Goody's 300 (Daytona)
| Wins | Top tens | Poles |
|---|---|---|
| 0 | 0 | 0 |

NASCAR FedEx Freight Truck Series career
- 13 races run over 4 years
- Best finish: 30th (1996)
- First race: 1995 Racing Champions 200 (Tucson)
- Last race: 2002 Federated Auto Parts 200 (Nashville)
| Wins | Top tens | Poles |
|---|---|---|
| 0 | 1 | 0 |

Mark Gibson (born August 14, 1957) is an American former stock car racing driver and team owner. He is a long-time competitor in the ARCA Racing Series, and has also made occasional appearances in NASCAR competition. He helped found the ARCA team Cunningham Motorsports.

== Personal life ==
Gibson was born in Richlands, Virginia, and is a resident of Winder, Georgia. The son of racer Bo Gibson, he grew up in Daytona Beach, Florida, and graduated in 1975 from Mainland High School. He is married, to Jan, who was the daughter of racer Curtis Crider, and they have one daughter, Michelle.

== Career ==
Gibson's racing career began in 1974 when, at the age of 16, he began competing in races at Volusia County Speedway; also running at New Smyrna Speedway, where he won the track's championship in 1979. Gibson began competing in the ARCA Racing Series in 1981, he moved from the Daytona Beach area to central Georgia in 1985, and won the series' Rookie of the Year title in 1986. He was the last ARCA driver to qualify at over 200 miles per hour (320 km/h) at Daytona International Speedway.

A four-time winner in ARCA, Gibson became part of the first two-car team in the series when he teamed with brothers Mike and Joe Cooksey and Don Faurbach from Maurtco Motorsports.

Gibson eventually stepped out of the driver seat to concentrate on developing new talent. He, along with Briggs Cunningham III and Kerry Scherer started Cunningham Motorsports in 1997 as CSG Motorsports, racing in ARCA and the NASCAR Craftsman Truck Series. Scherer moved the team to Charlotte in 2000, but he eventually returned to Georgia and worked with Gibson in the Mark Gibson Racing (MGR) shop from 2007 until 2010. Gibson became a partner, owner and General Manager of car No. 77. In 2009, that team would win nine races and their driver Parker Kligerman won ARCA Rookie of the Year. Gibson has been instrumental in the development of Sprint Cup Series and Nationwide Series driver Justin Allgaier and Truck Series driver Tayler Malsam who drove for Mark in 2008. In 2006, NASCAR driver Brad Keselowski drove Gibson's car at Kentucky Speedway in his stock car debut. Gibson also worked with Timmy Hill, the NASCAR Nationwide series Rookie of the Year in 2011. Gibson won ten races as a car owner.

Gibson raced on the dirt miles at DuQuoin and Springfield, Illinois against such drivers as Tony Stewart and Ken Schrader.

Gibson has also run in NASCAR on selected occasions, his last attempt being an unsuccessful bid in qualifying for the 1999 Daytona 500. He competed in the 1988 NASCAR Christmas 500 at the Calder Park Thunderdome in Australia, finishing eleventh. Gibson's brother Tony was formerly the crew chief for Kurt Busch at Stewart–Haas Racing in the Sprint Cup Series.

== Motorsports career results ==
=== NASCAR ===
(key) (Bold – Pole position awarded by qualifying time. Italics – Pole position earned by points standings or practice time. * – Most laps led.)

==== Winston Cup Series ====
NASCAR Winston Cup Series results
| Year | Team | No. | Make | 1 | 2 | 3 | 4 | 5 | 6 | 7 | 8 | 9 | 10 | 11 | 12 | 13 | 14 | 15 | 16 | 17 | 18 | 19 | 20 | 21 | 22 | 23 | 24 | 25 | 26 | 27 | 28 | 29 | 30 | 31 | 32 | 33 | 34 | NWCC | Pts | Ref |
|---|---|---|---|---|---|---|---|---|---|---|---|---|---|---|---|---|---|---|---|---|---|---|---|---|---|---|---|---|---|---|---|---|---|---|---|---|---|---|---|---|
| 1987 | Tri-Sack Racing | 98 | Pontiac | DAY | CAR | RCH | ATL | DAR | NWS | BRI | MAR | TAL | CLT | DOV | POC | RSD | MCH | DAY | POC | TAL | GLN | MCH | BRI | DAR | RCH | DOV; 34 | MAR | NWS | CLT | CAR | RSD | ATL | | | | | | 97th | 61 | |
| 1988 | | 59 | Pontiac | DAY; DNQ | RCH | CAR | ATL | DAR | BRI | NWS | MAR | TAL | CLT | DOV | RSD | POC | MCH | DAY; DNQ | POC | TAL; DNQ | GLN | MCH | BRI | DAR | RCH | DOV | MAR | CLT; DNQ | NWS | CAR | PHO | ATL | | | | | | NA | - | |
| 1989 | Collins Racing | 59 | Pontiac | DAY; DNQ | CAR | ATL | RCH | DAR | BRI | NWS | MAR | TAL | CLT | DOV | SON | POC | MCH | DAY; 33 | POC | TAL | GLN | MCH | BRI | DAR | RCH | DOV | MAR | CLT | NWS | CAR | PHO | ATL | | | | | | 91st | 64 | |
| 1990 | S & H Racing | 59 | Pontiac | DAY; DNQ | RCH | CAR | ATL | DAR | BRI | NWS | MAR | TAL | CLT | DOV | SON | POC | MCH | DAY | POC | TAL | GLN | MCH | BRI | DAR | RCH | DOV | MAR | NWS | CLT | CAR | PHO | ATL | | | | | | NA | - | |
| 1991 | Mark Gibson Racing | 59 | Pontiac | DAY | RCH | CAR | ATL | DAR | BRI | NWS | MAR | TAL; DNQ | CLT | DOV | SON | POC | MCH | DAY | POC | TAL; DNQ | GLN | MCH | BRI | DAR | RCH | DOV | MAR | NWS | CLT | CAR | PHO | ATL; DNQ | | | | | | NA | - | |
| 1992 | Collins Racing | 97 | Olds | DAY; DNQ | CAR | RCH | ATL | DAR | BRI | NWS | MAR | TAL | CLT | DOV | SON | POC | MCH | DAY | POC | TAL | GLN | MCH | BRI | DAR | RCH | DOV | MAR | NWS | CLT | CAR | PHO | ATL | | | | | | NA | - | |
| 1996 | Campbell Racing | 49 | Ford | DAY | CAR | RCH | ATL | DAR | BRI | NWS | MAR | TAL | SON | CLT; DNQ | DOV | POC | MCH | DAY | NHA | POC | TAL | IND | GLN | MCH | BRI | DAR | RCH | DOV | MAR | NWS | CLT | CAR | PHO | ATL | | | | NA | - | |
| 1998 | CSG Racing | 59 | Ford | DAY; DNQ | CAR | LVS | ATL | DAR | BRI | TEX | MAR | TAL | CAL | CLT | DOV | RCH | MCH | POC | SON | NHA | POC | IND | GLN | MCH | BRI | NHA | DAR | RCH | DOV | MAR | CLT | TAL | DAY | PHO | CAR | ATL | | NA | - | |
| 1999 | CSG Racing | 59 | Ford | DAY; DNQ | CAR | LVS | ATL | DAR | TEX | BRI | MAR | TAL | CAL | RCH | CLT | DOV | MCH | POC | SON | DAY | NHA | POC | IND | GLN | MCH | BRI | DAR | RCH | NHA | DOV | MAR | CLT | TAL | CAR | PHO | HOM | ATL | NA | - | |

===== Daytona 500 =====
| Year | Team | Manufacturer | Start | Finish |
|---|---|---|---|---|
| 1988 | | Pontiac | DNQ | |
| 1989 | Collins Racing | Pontiac | DNQ | |
| 1990 | S & H Racing | Pontiac | DNQ | |
| 1992 | Collins Racing | Olds | DNQ | |
| 1998 | CSG Racing | Ford | DNQ | |
| 1999 | CSG Racing | Ford | DNQ | |

==== Busch Series ====
NASCAR Busch Series results
| Year | Team | No. | Make | 1 | 2 | 3 | 4 | 5 | 6 | 7 | 8 | 9 | 10 | 11 | 12 | 13 | 14 | 15 | 16 | 17 | 18 | 19 | 20 | 21 | 22 | 23 | 24 | 25 | 26 | 27 | 28 | 29 | 30 | 31 | 32 | 33 | 34 | 35 | NBSC | Pts | Ref |
|---|---|---|---|---|---|---|---|---|---|---|---|---|---|---|---|---|---|---|---|---|---|---|---|---|---|---|---|---|---|---|---|---|---|---|---|---|---|---|---|---|---|
| 1982 | Gibson Racing | 90 | Pontiac | DAY; 23 | RCH | BRI | MAR | DAR | HCY | SBO | CRW | RCH | LGY | DOV | HCY | | | | | CAR; 24 | CRW | SBO | HCY | LGY | IRP | BRI | HCY | RCH | MAR | | | | | | | | | | 76th | 334 | |
| 1982 | Gibson Racing | 10 | Pontiac | | | | | | | | | | | | | CLT; 28 | ASH | HCY | SBO | | | | | | | | | | | CLT; 31 | HCY | MAR | | | | | | | 76th | 334 | |
| 1983 | Gibson Racing | 90 | Pontiac | DAY | RCH | CAR | HCY | MAR | NWS | SBO | GPS | LGY | DOV | BRI | CLT; 20 | SBO | HCY | ROU | SBO | ROU | CRW | ROU | SBO | HCY | LGY | IRP | GPS | BRI | HCY | DAR; 17 | RCH | NWS | SBO | MAR | ROU | CLT | HCY | MAR | 85th | 215 | |
| 1984 | Gibson Racing | 90 | Pontiac | DAY; 25 | RCH | CAR | HCY | MAR | DAR | ROU | NSV | LGY | MLW | DOV | CLT | SBO | HCY | ROU | SBO | ROU | HCY | IRP | LGY | SBO | BRI | DAR | RCH | NWS | CLT | HCY | CAR | MAR | | | | | | | 91st | 88 | |
| 2004 | TC Motorsports | 34 | Chevy | DAY | CAR | LVS | DAR | BRI | TEX | NSH | TAL | CAL | GTY | RCH | NZH | CLT | DOV | NSH | KEN | MLW | DAY | CHI | NHA | PPR | IRP | MCH | BRI | CAL | RCH | DOV | KAN | CLT | MEM | ATL; DNQ | PHO | DAR | HOM | | NA | - | |

==== Craftsman Truck Series ====
NASCAR Craftsman Truck Series results
| Year | Team | No. | Make | 1 | 2 | 3 | 4 | 5 | 6 | 7 | 8 | 9 | 10 | 11 | 12 | 13 | 14 | 15 | 16 | 17 | 18 | 19 | 20 | 21 | 22 | 23 | 24 | 25 | 26 | NCTC | Pts | Ref |
|---|---|---|---|---|---|---|---|---|---|---|---|---|---|---|---|---|---|---|---|---|---|---|---|---|---|---|---|---|---|---|---|---|
| 1995 | Grandaddy Racing | 30 | Dodge | PHO | TUS; 11 | SGS; 22 | MMR | POR | EVG | I70 | LVL | BRI | MLW | CNS | HPT | IRP | FLM | RCH | MAR | NWS | SON | MMR | PHO | | | | | | | 58th | 227 | |
| 1996 | Toy Box Racing | 59 | Dodge | HOM; DNQ | PHO | POR | EVG | TUS | CNS | HPT | | | | | | | | | | | | | | | | | | | | 30th | 820 | |
| 1996 | Billy Ballew Motorsports | 15 | Ford | | | | | | | | BRI; 12 | NZH | MLW; 9 | LVL; 14 | I70; 15 | IRP; 32 | FLM; 23 | GLN; 20 | NSV | RCH; 17 | NHA | MAR | NWS | SON | MMR | PHO | LVS | | | 30th | 820 | |
| 1997 | AAG Racing | 65 | Chevy | WDW | TUS | HOM | PHO | POR | EVG | I70 | NHA | TEX | BRI | NZH | MLW | LVL | CNS | HPT | IRP | FLM; 27 | NSV | GLN | RCH | MAR | SON | MMR | CAL | PHO | LVS | 113th | 85 | |
| 1999 | CSG Racing | 59 | Ford | HOM | PHO | EVG | MMR | MAR | MEM | PPR | I70 | BRI | TEX | PIR | GLN | MLW | NSV | NZH | MCH | NHA | IRP | GTY | HPT | RCH | LVS | LVL | TEX | CAL; DNQ | | 122nd | 0 | |
| 2001 | Ferrell Lee | 10 | Ford | DAY | HOM | MMR | MAR | GTY | DAR | PPR | DOV | TEX | MEM | MLW | KAN | KEN | NHA | IRP | NSH | CIC; DNQ | NZH | RCH | SBO | TEX | LVS | PHO | CAL | | | 114th | 0 | |
| 2002 | Billy Ballew Motorsports | 15 | Ford | DAY | DAR | MAR | GTY | PPR | DOV | TEX | MEM | MLW | KAN | KEN | NHA | MCH | IRP; 20 | NSH; 23 | RCH | TEX | SBO | LVS | CAL | PHO | HOM | | | | | 65th | 197 | |

=== ARCA Racing Series ===
(key) (Bold – Pole position awarded by qualifying time. Italics – Pole position earned by points standings or practice time. * – Most laps led.)

ARCA Racing Series results
| Year | Team | No. | Make | 1 | 2 | 3 | 4 | 5 | 6 | 7 | 8 | 9 | 10 | 11 | 12 | 13 | 14 | 15 | 16 | 17 | 18 | 19 | 20 | 21 | 22 | 23 | 24 | 25 | ARSC | Pts | Ref |
|---|---|---|---|---|---|---|---|---|---|---|---|---|---|---|---|---|---|---|---|---|---|---|---|---|---|---|---|---|---|---|---|
| 1981 | Bo Gibson Racing | | Pontiac | DAY; DNQ | DSP | FRS | FRS | BFS | TAL | FRS | COR | | | | | | | | | | | | | | | | | | NA | - | |
| 1982 | Bo Gibson Racing | 90 | Pontiac | NSV | DAY; 33 | | | | | | | | | | | | | | | | | | | | | | | | NA | - | |
| 1982 | Bo Gibson Racing | 80 | Pontiac | | | TAL; 26 | FRS | CMS | WIN | NSV | TAT | TAL | FRS | BFS | MIL | SND | | | | | | | | | | | | | NA | - | |
| 1983 | Bo Gibson Racing | 10 | Pontiac | DAY | NSV | TAL; 29 | LPR | LPR | ISF | IRP | SSP | FRS | BFS | WIN | LPR | POC | TAL; 11 | MCS | FRS | MIL | DSF | ZAN | SND | | | | | | NA | - | |
| 1984 | Bo Gibson Racing | 90 | Pontiac | DAY; 24 | ATL; 31 | TAL; 38 | CSP | SMS | FRS | MCS | LCS | IRP | TAL; 24 | FRS | ISF | DSF | TOL | MGR | | | | | | | | | | | NA | - | |
| 1985 | Bo Gibson Racing | 90 | Pontiac | ATL; 37 | DAY; 17 | ATL; 24 | TAL; 32 | ATL; 34 | SSP | IRP | CSP | FRS | IRP | OEF | ISF | DSF | TOL | | | | | | | | | | | | 21st | - | |
| 1986 | Bo Gibson Racing | 90 | Pontiac | ATL; 32 | | ATL; 24 | | SIR; 12 | SSP; 17 | FRS; 19 | KIL; 13 | CSP; 8 | | BLN; 10 | | DSF; 19 | TOL; 6 | MCS; 16 | | | | | | | | | | | 8th | 1935 | |
| 1986 | Bo Gibson Racing | 90 | Buick | | DAY; 10 | | TAL; 5 | | | | | | TAL; 8 | | | | | | ATL; 7 | | | | | | | | | | 8th | 1935 | |
| 1986 | Rose Racing | | Pontiac | | | | | | | | | | | | ISF; 29 | | | | | | | | | | | | | | 8th | 1935 | |
| 1987 | Tri-Sack Racing | 90 | Pontiac | DAY; 8 | ATL; 19 | TAL; 21 | DEL | ACS | TOL | ROC | POC | FRS | KIL | TAL; 34 | FRS | ISF | INF | DSF | SLM | ATL; 8 | | | | | | | | | 31st | - | |
| 1988 | Collins Racing | 3 | Pontiac | DAY; 37 | ATL; 30 | TAL; 11 | FRS | PCS | ROC | POC | WIN | KIL | ACS | SLM | POC | TAL; 41 | DEL | FRS | ISF | DSF | SLM | ATL | | | | | | | 41st | - | |
| 1989 | Collins Racing | 59 | Pontiac | DAY; DNQ | ATL; 23 | KIL | TAL; 38 | FRS | POC | KIL | HAG | POC | TAL; 20 | DEL | FRS | ISF | TOL | DSF | SLM | ATL; 21 | | | | | | | | | 37th | - | |
| 1990 | Collins Racing | 59 | Pontiac | DAY; 2 | ATL; 2 | | TAL; 6 | FRS; 15 | POC; 12 | KIL; 6 | TOL; 13 | HAG | POC | TAL; 38 | MCH | ISF | TOL | DSF | WIN | DEL; 20 | ATL; 40 | | | | | | | | 12th | - | |
| 1990 | Collins Racing | 59 | Chevy | | | KIL; 6 | | | | | | | | | | | | | | | | | | | | | | | 12th | - | |
| 1991 | | 98 | Olds | DAY; 31 | | | | | | | | | | | | | | | | | | | | | | | | | 9th | 3910 | |
| 1991 | Charlie Newby Racing | 77 | Buick | | ATL; 40 | | TAL; 15 | TOL; 8 | FRS; 14 | POC; 27 | MCH; 8 | KIL; 14 | FRS; 19 | DEL; 20 | POC; 11 | | HPT; 10 | | | TOL; 23 | DSF; 5 | | ATL; 26 | | | | | | 9th | 3910 | |
| 1991 | Charlie Newby Racing | 77 | Chevy | | | KIL; 17 | | | | | | | | | | | | | | | | | | | | | | | 9th | 3910 | |
| 1991 | Charlie Newby Racing | 77 | Pontiac | | | | | | | | | | | | | TAL; 7 | | MCH; 15 | | | | TWS; 37 | | | | | | | 9th | 3910 | |
| 1991 | Charlie Newby Racing | 77 | Olds | | | | | | | | | | | | | | | | ISF; 10 | | | | | | | | | | 9th | 3910 | |
| 1992 | Charlie Newby Racing | 77 | Chrysler | DAY; 21 | FIF; 25 | | TAL; 36 | TOL | KIL | POC | MCH | FRS | KIL | NSH | DEL | | | | | | | | | | | | | | 32nd | - | |
| 1992 | | 59 | Pontiac | | | TWS; 37 | | | | | | | | | | | | | | | | | | | | | | | 32nd | - | |
| 1992 | AAG Racing | 9 | Pontiac | | | | | | | | | | | | | POC; 34 | HPT | FRS | ISF | TOL | DSF | | | | | | | | 32nd | - | |
| 1992 | Glanville Motorsports | 95 | Olds | | | | | | | | | | | | | | | | | | | TWS; 34 | SLM | ATL | | | | | 32nd | - | |
| 1993 | | 81 | Pontiac | DAY | FIF | TWS | TAL | KIL | CMS | FRS | TOL | POC | MCH | FRS | POC; 33 | | | | | | | | | | | | | | 26th | - | |
| 1993 | Charlie Newby Racing | 77 | Chrysler | | | | | | | | | | | | | KIL; 13 | ISF; 23 | DSF; 25 | TOL; 19 | SLM; 34 | WIN; 24 | ATL; 28 | | | | | | | 26th | - | |
| 1994 | Mark Gibson Racing | 90 | Pontiac | DAY; DNQ | TAL | FIF | LVL | KIL | TOL | FRS | MCH | DMS | POC | | | | | | | | | | | | | | | | 88th | 480 | |
| 1994 | Charlie Newby Racing | 77 | Pontiac | | | | | | | | | | | POC; 16 | KIL | FRS | INF | I70 | ISF | DSF | TOL | SLM | WIN | | | | | | 88th | 480 | |
| 1994 | Mark Gibson Racing | 97 | Pontiac | | | | | | | | | | | | | | | | | | | | | ATL; 35 | | | | | 88th | 480 | |
| 1995 | Charlie Newby Racing | 7 | Chrysler | DAY; 34 | ATL; 8 | TAL; 34 | FIF; 17 | KIL; 8 | FRS; 5 | | I80; 24 | MCS; 11 | FRS; 27 | | | KIL; 12 | FRS; 12 | SBS; 21 | LVL; 25 | ISF | DSF; 18 | SLM; 11 | WIN; 23 | | | | | | 10th | 3935 | |
| 1995 | Charlie Newby Racing | 7 | Dodge | | | | | | | MCH; 28 | | | | POC; 18 | POC; 23 | | | | | | | | | ATL; 42 | | | | | 10th | 3935 | |
| 1996 | Billy Ballew Motorsports | 59 | Dodge | DAY; 16 | | | | | | | | | | | | | | | | | | | | | | | | | 21st | - | |
| 1996 | Billy Ballew Motorsports | 59 | Ford | | ATL; 3 | SLM; 24 | | | | CLT; 5 | CLT; 28 | KIL | FRS | POC | MCH | FRS | TOL | POC | MCH | INF | SBS | ISF | DSF; 26 | KIL; 11 | SLM | WIN | CLT; 7 | ATL; 3 | 21st | - | |
| 1996 | Billy Ballew Motorsports | 59 | Chevy | | | | TAL; 28 | FIF | LVL | | | | | | | | | | | | | | | | | | | | 21st | - | |
| 1997 | Mark Gibson Racing | 59 | Ford | DAY; 3 | ATL; 9 | SLM; 15 | CLT; 11 | CLT; 30 | POC; 8 | MCH; 2 | SBS; 3 | TOL; 24 | KIL; 9 | FRS; 12 | MIN; 7 | POC; 4 | MCH; 2 | DSF; 2 | GTW; 1 | SLM; 5 | WIN; 21 | CLT; 2 | TAL; 5 | ISF; 30 | ATL; 25 | | | | 4th | 5135 | |
| 1998 | Mark Gibson Racing | 59 | Ford | DAY; 10 | ATL; 5* | SLM; 2 | CLT; 5 | MEM; 3 | MCH; 9 | POC; 20 | SBS; 5 | TOL; 17 | PPR; 7 | POC; 2 | KIL; 18 | FRS; 5 | ISF; 3 | ATL; 3 | DSF; 4 | SLM; 19 | TEX; 1* | WIN; 28 | CLT; 4 | TAL; 37 | ATL; 7 | | | | 2nd | 5455 | |
| 1999 | Mark Gibson Racing | 59 | Ford | DAY; 37 | ATL; 5 | SLM; 11 | AND; 8 | CLT; 34 | MCH; 14 | POC; 5 | TOL; 5 | SBS; 2 | BLN; 16 | POC; 13 | KIL; 13 | FRS; 13 | FLM; 8 | ISF; 3 | WIN; 16 | DSF; 34 | SLM; 4 | CLT; 18 | | ATL; 12 | | | | | 5th | 4630 | |
| 1999 | Mark Gibson Racing | 59 | Chevy | | | | | | | | | | | | | | | | | | | | TAL; 36 | | | | | | 5th | 4630 | |
| 2000 | Maurtco Motorsports | 59 | Chevy | DAY; 35 | SLM; 4 | AND; 1 | CLT; 8 | KIL; 20 | FRS; 24 | MCH; 28 | POC; 21 | TOL; 5 | KEN; 3 | BLN; 4 | POC; 10 | WIN; 20 | ISF; 8 | KEN; 8 | DSF; 17 | SLM; 30 | CLT; 21 | TAL; 32 | ATL; 17 | | | | | | 7th | 4065 | |
| 2001 | Team Rensi Motorsports | 83 | Chevy | DAY; 27 | | | | | | | | | | | | | | | | | | | | | | | | | 29th | 1355 | |
| 2001 | Team Rensi Motorsports | 83 | Ford | | NSH; 31 | | | | | | | | | | | | | | | | | | | | | | | | 29th | 1355 | |
| 2001 | Mark Gibson Racing | 83 | Ford | | | WIN; 6 | | | | | | | | | | | | | | | | | | | | | | | 29th | 1355 | |
| 2001 | Mark Gibson Racing | 83 | Chevy | | | | SLM; 27 | GTY; 29 | KEN | CLT; 18 | KAN | MCH | POC | MEM | GLN | KEN | MCH | POC | NSH | ISF | CHI | DSF | SLM | TOL | BLN | | | | 29th | 1355 | |
| 2001 | Mark Gibson Racing | 59 | Chevy | | | | | | | | | | | | | | | | | | | | | | | CLT; 9 | TAL; 19 | ATL; 27 | 29th | 1355 | |
| 2002 | Mark Gibson Racing | 59 | Chevy | DAY; 16 | | | SLM; 15 | | | | | | TOL; 25 | SBO; 15 | | | | | | | | | | | | | | | 8th | 4455 | |
| 2002 | Mark Gibson Racing | 59 | Ford | | ATL; 38 | NSH; 12 | | KEN; 7 | CLT; 11 | KAN; 6 | POC; 10 | MCH; 34 | | | KEN; 5 | BLN; 5 | POC; 16 | NSH; 32 | ISF; 29 | WIN; 4 | DSF; 36 | CHI; 7 | SLM; 11 | | | | | | 8th | 4455 | |
| 2002 | Mark Gibson Racing | 59 | Pontiac | | | | | | | | | | | | | | | | | | | | | TAL; 7 | | | | | 8th | 4455 | |
| 2002 | Mark Gibson Racing | 50 | Ford | | | | | | | | | | | | | | | | | | | | | | CLT; 31 | | | | 8th | 4455 | |
| 2003 | Mark Gibson Racing | 59 | Pontiac | DAY; 9 | | | | | | | | | | | | | | | | | | | TAL; 32 | | | | | | 6th | 4830 | |
| 2003 | Mark Gibson Racing | 59 | Chevy | | ATL; 1 | NSH; 7 | SLM; 19 | TOL; 24 | KEN; 6 | CLT; 7 | BLN; 30 | KAN; 6 | MCH; 12 | LER; 15 | POC; 3 | POC; 4 | NSH; 8 | ISF; 3 | WIN; 19 | DSF; 6 | CHI; 8 | SLM; 19 | | CLT; 35 | | | | | 6th | 4830 | |
| 2003 | Mark Gibson Racing | 59 | Ford | | | | | | | | | | | | | | | | | | | | | | SBO; 33 | | | | 6th | 4830 | |
| 2004 | Mark Gibson Racing | 59 | Pontiac | DAY; 21 | | | | | | | | | | | | | | | | | | | | | TAL; 16 | | | | 6th | 4755 | |
| 2004 | Mark Gibson Racing | 59 | Chevy | | NSH; 27 | SLM; 9 | KEN; 3 | TOL; 5 | CLT; 40 | KAN; 7 | POC; 8 | MCH; 7 | SBO; 8 | BLN; 14 | KEN; 8 | GTW; 24 | POC; 21 | LER; 12 | NSH; 12 | ISF; 32 | TOL; 19 | DSF; 5 | CHI; 11 | SLM; 3 | | | | | 6th | 4755 | |
| 2005 | Mark Gibson Racing | 59 | Pontiac | DAY; 30 | | | | | | | | | | | | | | | | | | | | | | TAL; 27 | | | 5th | 4670 | |
| 2005 | Mark Gibson Racing | 59 | Chevy | | NSH; 17 | SLM; 13 | KEN; 9 | TOL; 10 | LAN; 12 | MIL; 8 | POC; 22 | MCH; 29 | KAN; 12 | KEN; 22 | BLN; 15 | POC; 14 | GTW; 8 | LER; 14 | NSH; 14 | MCH; 18 | ISF; 4 | TOL; 30 | DSF; 7 | CHI; 7 | SLM; 33 | | | | 5th | 4670 | |
| 2006 | Johnny Leonard Racing | 13 | Chevy | DAY | NSH | SLM | WIN | KEN | TOL | POC | MCH | KAN | KEN; DNQ | BLN; DNQ | POC; 38 | GTW; 39 | NSH; 38 | MCH | ISF; 3 | MIL; 39 | TOL | DSF; 11 | CHI; DNQ | SLM; 33 | TAL; DNQ | IOW; 35 | | | 39th | 1090 | |
| 2007 | Mark Gibson Racing | 13 | Chevy | DAY | USA; 39 | NSH | SLM | KAN | WIN | KEN | TOL | IOW | POC | | | | | | | | | | | | | | | | 70th | 370 | |
| 2007 | Jack Bowsher & Associates | 21 | Dodge | | | | | | | | | | | MCH; DNQ | BLN | KEN | POC | NSH | | | | | | | | | | | 70th | 370 | |
| 2007 | Cunningham Motorsports | 4 | Dodge | | | | | | | | | | | | | | | | ISF; 15 | MIL | GTW | DSF; 15 | CHI | SLM | TAL | TOL | | | 70th | 370 | |
| 2009 | Cunningham Motorsports | 4 | Dodge | DAY | SLM | CAR | TAL | KEN | TOL | POC | MCH | MFD | IOW | KEN | BLN | POC | ISF; 31 | CHI | TOL | DSF; 28 | NJE | SLM | KAN | CAR | | | | | 119th | 165 | |
| 2010 | Mark Gibson Racing | 59 | Chevy | DAY | PBE | SLM; 32 | TEX | TAL | TOL | | | | | | | | ISF; 29 | | DSF; 31 | TOL | SLM | KAN | CAR | | | | | | 43rd | 540 | |
| 2010 | Mark Gibson Racing | 59 | Dodge | | | | | | | POC; 34 | MCH; 39 | | MFD; 27 | POC | BLN | NJE | | CHI; 30 | | | | | | | | | | | 43rd | 540 | |
| 2010 | Mark Gibson Racing | 9 | Chevy | | | | | | | | | IOW; 38 | | | | | | | | | | | | | | | | | 43rd | 540 | |
| 2013 | Kimmel Racing | 68 | Ford | DAY | MOB | SLM | TAL | TOL | ELK | POC | MCH; 23 | ROA | WIN | CHI | NJE; 26 | POC | BLN | ISF | MAD | DSF | IOW | SLM | KEN | KAN | | | | | 97th | 215 | |
