= Wes Russell =

American racing driver

- Born: April 28, 1972 (age 54); Muncie, Indiana, U.S.

ARCA Menards Series career
- 37 races run over 5 years
- Best finish: 15th (1997)
- First race: 1995 Eddie Gilstrap Fall Classic (Salem)
- Last race: 1999 Eddie Gilstrap Motors 200 (Salem)
Wins	Top tens	Poles
0	8	1
- Statistics up to date as of December 16, 2024.

Wes Russell Jr. (born April 28, 1972) is an American former professional stock car racing driver who has competed in the ARCA Bondo/Mar-Hyde Series from 1995 to 1999.

Russell has also competed in the ASA CRA Super Series, the CRA Late Model Sportsman Series, and the CRA Street Stocks Series.

== Motorsports results ==
=== NASCAR ===
(key) (Bold - Pole position awarded by qualifying time. Italics - Pole position earned by points standings or practice time. * – Most laps led.)

==== Craftsman Truck Series ====
NASCAR Craftsman Truck Series results
Year	Team	No.	Make	1	2	3	4	5	6	7	8	9	10	11	12	13	14	15	16	17	18	19	20	21	22	23	24	NCTC	Pts	Ref
2000	Sands Motorsports	47	Ford	DAY	HOM	PHO	MMR	MAR	PIR	GTY	MEM	PPR	EVG	TEX	KEN	GLN	MLW	NHA	NZH	MCH	IRP; DNQ	NSV	CIC	RCH	DOV	TEX	CAL	119th	40	

=== ARCA Bondo/Mar-Hyde Series ===
(key) (Bold – Pole position awarded by qualifying time. Italics – Pole position earned by points standings or practice time. * – Most laps led. ** – All laps led.)

ARCA Bondo/Mar-Hyde Series results
Year	Team	No.	Make	1	2	3	4	5	6	7	8	9	10	11	12	13	14	15	16	17	18	19	20	21	22	23	24	25	ABMHSC	Pts	Ref
1995	Russell Racing	07	Chevy	DAY	ATL	TAL	FIF	KIL	FRS	MCH	I80	MCS	FRS	POC	POC	KIL	FRS	SBS	LVL	ISF	DSF	SLM; 31	WIN; 21	ATL					N/A	0	
1996	Russell Racing	07	Chevy	DAY	ATL	SLM; 13	TAL	FIF	LVL; 13	CLT	CLT	KIL	FRS	POC	MCH	FRS	TOL	POC	MCH	INF	SBS	ISF	DSF	KIL	SLM	WIN; 4	CLT	ATL	N/A	0	
1997	Bobby Gerhart Racing	85	Chevy	DAY	ATL	SLM; 8	CLT	CLT	POC	MCH	SBS; 12	TOL; 28	KIL; 14	FRS; 18						SLM; 16	WIN; 20	CLT	TAL						15th	1830	
1997	Bobby Gerhart Racing	05	Chevy												**MIN**; 28	POC	MCH	DSF; 14						ISF; 41					15th	1830	
1997	Bobby Gerhart Racing	52	Chevy																GTW; 32										15th	1830	
1997	Dill Whittymore	56	Chevy																						ATL; 32				15th	1830	
1998	Bobby Gerhart Racing	5	Chevy	DAY	ATL	SLM; 20	CLT				SBS; 13	TOL; 26	PPR	POC	KIL; 9	FRS; 7				SLM; 5	TEX	WIN; DNQ	CLT	TAL	ATL				19th	1595	
1998	Bobby Gerhart Racing	85	Chevy					MEM; 26	MCH	POC							ISF; 11	ATL	DSF; 14										19th	1595	
1998	Sands Motorsports	43	Pontiac																			WIN; 21							19th	1595	
1999	Bobby Gerhart Racing	85	Chevy	DAY	ATL	SLM; 30	AND; 10	CLT	MCH	POC	TOL; 26	SBS; 11	BLN; 21	POC	KIL; 8	FRS; 25	FLM	ISF; DNQ	WIN; 7	DSF; 14	SLM; 29	CLT	TAL	ATL					23rd	1395	
