= Josh Baltes =

American racing driver

- Born: January 5, 1975 (age 51); Dayton, Ohio, U.S.
- Awards: 1997 ARCA Bondo/Mar-Hyde Series Rookie of the Year

ARCA Menards Series career
- 39 races run over 4 years
- Best finish: 6th (1997)
- First race: 1996 Bill Eubank Memorial 150 (Kil-Kare)
- Last race: 1999 FirstPlus Financial 200 (Daytona)
Wins	Top tens	Poles
0	9	0
- Statistics up to date as of December 16, 2024.

Josh Baltes (born January 5, 1975) is an American former professional stock car racing driver who has competed in the ARCA Bondo/Mar-Hyde Series from 1996 to 1999.

Baltes is a former graduate at Ohio State University.

== Motorsports results ==
=== ARCA Bondo/Mar-Hyde Series ===
(key) (Bold – Pole position awarded by qualifying time. Italics – Pole position earned by points standings or practice time. * – Most laps led. ** – All laps led.)

ARCA Bondo/Mar-Hyde Series results
Year	Team	No.	Make	1	2	3	4	5	6	7	8	9	10	11	12	13	14	15	16	17	18	19	20	21	22	23	24	25	ABMHSC	Pts	Ref
1996	Jim Leonard	52	Chevy	DAY	ATL	SLM	TAL	FIF	LVL	CLT	CLT	KIL; 20	FRS	POC	MCH	FRS	TOL	POC	MCH	INF									N/A	0	
1996	Jim Leonard	51	Olds																		SBS; 12	ISF							N/A	0	
1996	Jim Leonard	35	Olds																				DSF; 33	KIL					N/A	0	
1996	Jim Leonard	18	Olds																						SLM; 22				N/A	0	
1996	Jim Leonard	02	Olds																							WIN; 28	CLT	ATL	N/A	0	
1997	Terry Baltes	18	Chevy	DAY	ATL	SLM; 11	CLT; 32	CLT; 21	POC; 16	MCH; 13	SBS; 5	TOL; 6	KIL; 17	FRS; 9	MIN; 14	POC; 11	MCH; 17	DSF; 25	GTW; 13	SLM; 9	WIN; 19	CLT; 11	TAL; 9	ISF; 15	ATL; 11				6th	4015	
1998	Terry Baltes	18	Chevy	DAY; 34		SLM; 3	CLT; 13	MEM; 7	MCH; 26	POC; 24	SBS; 10	TOL; 14	PPR; 9	POC	KIL; 19	FRS; 27	ISF	ATL; 13	DSF	SLM; 27	TEX	WIN; DNQ	CLT	TAL	ATL				13th	2520	
1998	Terry Baltes	18	Ford		ATL; 33																								13th	2520	
1999	Terry Baltes	18	Ford	DAY; 29	ATL	SLM	AND	CLT	MCH	POC	TOL	SBS	BLN	POC	KIL	FRS	FLM	ISF	WIN	DSF	SLM	CLT	TAL	ATL					136th	85	
