= Shane Doles =

American racing driver

- Born: February 24, 1966 (age 60); Gray, Georgia, U.S.

ARCA Menards Series career
- 15 races run over 4 years
- Best finish: 40th (1995)
- First race: 1995 Jiffy Lube 300 (Atlanta)
- Last race: 1999 FirstPlus Financial 200 (Daytona)
Wins	Top tens	Poles
0	5	0
- Statistics up to date as of November 27, 2024.

Shane Doles (born February 24, 1966) is an American former professional stock car racing driver who has previously competed in the ARCA Bondo/Mar-Hyde Series from 1995 to 1999.

Doles has also competed in the Trans Am Championship.

== Motorsports career results ==
=== NASCAR ===
(key) (Bold - Pole position awarded by qualifying time. Italics - Pole position earned by points standings or practice time. * – Most laps led.)

==== Craftsman Truck Series ====
NASCAR Craftsman Truck Series results
Year	Team	No.	Make	1	2	3	4	5	6	7	8	9	10	11	12	13	14	15	16	17	18	19	20	21	22	23	24	25	26	NCTC	Pts	Ref
1997	Art Hermann	59	Dodge	WDW; DNQ	TUS	HOM	PHO	POR	EVG	I70	NHA	TEX	BRI	NZH	MLW	LVL	CNS	HPT	IRP	FLM	NSV	GLN	RCH	MAR	SON	MMR	CAL	PHO	LVS	165th	1	

=== ARCA Bondo/Mar-Hyde Series ===
(key) (Bold – Pole position awarded by qualifying time. Italics – Pole position earned by points standings or practice time. * – Most laps led. ** – All laps led.)

ARCA Bondo/Mar-Hyde Series results
Year	Team	No.	Make	1	2	3	4	5	6	7	8	9	10	11	12	13	14	15	16	17	18	19	20	21	22	23	24	25	ABMHSC	Pts	Ref
1995	Shane Doles	97	Pontiac	DAY	ATL; 31	TAL	FIF	KIL	FRS	MCH; 37	I80	MCS	FRS	POC; 7	POC; 9	KIL	FRS	SBS	LVL	ISF	DSF	SLM	WIN	ATL; 19					40th	865	
1996	Shane Doles	97	Pontiac	DAY; 28	ATL; 23	SLM	TAL; 8	FIF; DNQ	LVL	CLT; 36	CLT	KIL	FRS	POC	MCH	FRS	TOL											ATL; 29	N/A	0	
1996	Shane Doles	51	Chevy															POC; 34	MCH	INF	SBS	ISF	DSF	KIL	SLM	WIN	CLT		N/A	0	
1997	Shane Doles	97	Pontiac	DAY; 10																									N/A	0	
1997	Billy Ballew Motorsports	97	Ford		ATL; 13	SLM	CLT; 10	CLT; 38	POC	MCH	SBS	TOL	KIL	FRS	MIN	POC	MCH	DSF	GTW	SLM	WIN	CLT	TAL	ISF	ATL				N/A	0	
1999	Shane Doles	97	Ford	DAY; 26	ATL	SLM	AND	CLT	MCH	POC; DNQ	TOL	SBS	BLN	POC	KIL	FRS	FLM	ISF	WIN	DSF	SLM	CLT	TAL	ATL					120th	125	
