= Joe Cooksey =

American racing driver (born 1966)

- Born: June 11, 1966 (age 60); Centralia, Illinois, U.S.

NASCAR O'Reilly Auto Parts Series career
- 3 races run over 1 year
- Best finish: 83rd (2001)
- First race: 2001 Carquest Auto Parts 250 (Gateway)
- Last race: 2001 Sam's Town 250 (Memphis)
Wins	Top tens	Poles
0	0	0

NASCAR FedEx Freight Truck Series career
- 1 race run over 1 year
- Best finish: 83rd (2002)
- First race: 2002 Missouri-Illinois Dodge Dealers Ram Tough 200 (Gateway)
Wins	Top tens	Poles
0	0	0

ARCA Menards Series career
- 146 races run over 20 years
- Best finish: 4th (1999)
- First race: 1996 Engineered Components 200 (Salem)
- Last race: 2025 Allen Crowe 100 (Springfield)
Wins	Top tens	Poles
0	57	1
- Statistics up to date as of August 17, 2025.

Joe Cooksey (born June 11, 1966) is an American professional stock car racing driver who last competed part-time in the ARCA Menards Series, driving the No. 86 Ford for Clubb Racing Inc. He made his debut in the series in 1996, and has since earned 57 top-ten finishes and one pole position. He also has run three races in the NASCAR Busch Series and one race in the NASCAR Craftsman Truck Series.

== Racing career ==
Cooksey first made his ARCA Bondo/Mar-Hyde Series debut in 1996 driving the No. 41 Chevrolet that he owned at Salem Speedway, where he would finish 22nd due to a rear end issue. He would make eight more starts that year and would earn four top-tens, including a best result of sixth at Indianapolis Raceway Park. In the following year, he would run twelve races, mainly in the No. 51 Chevrolet, and would earn four more top-tens with a best result of seventh at the DuQuoin State Fairgrounds Racetrack, and finish twelfth in the overall standings. In 1998, he ran eighteen of the 22 races on the schedule, and finished in the top-ten nine times, including a best finish of third at Winchester Speedway.

In 1999, Cooksey ran the full schedule in his self-owned No. 51 entry. In the first race of the year at Daytona International Speedway, during a caution period midway through the race, Cooksey collided with the back of the pace car. He, along with pace car driver Jack Wallace and ARCA official Buster Auton, escaped serious injury. Afterwards, he earned eleven top-tens and four top-fives, including a best finish of second at Flat Rock Speedway, to finish fourth in the standings. In the following year, he partnered with Don Fauerbach for the full season in 2000, and finished on the top-ten five times with a best finish of third at the Illinois State Fairgrounds Racetrack. He got his first pole position at DuQuoin, to finish ninth in the standings. This would be the last time he would run the full ARCA schedule.

In 2001, Cooksey downsized his schedule, only racing in nine races, and finishing in the top-ten five times. It was also during this year that he made his NASCAR Busch Series driving the No. 73 Chevrolet at Gateway International Raceway, finishing 29th due to a brake issue. He would make two more Busch races that year at Indianapolis and Memphis Motorsports Park. For next year, he made his NASCAR Craftsman Truck Series debut in the No. 59 Chevrolet driving for Fauerbach at Gateway, and finished 23rd. He also attempted to make the race at Memphis, but failed to qualify for the event. On the ARCA side, he made only three starts, finishing in the top-five twice at both dirt events at Springfield and DuQuoin. In the following year, he solely focused on ARCA, running nine races with a best finish of third at DuQuoin.

In 2004, Cooksey ran a majority of the races driving for Hixson Motorsports in the No. 23, and earned five top-tens with a best finish of fifth at South Boston Speedway. In 2005, he ran thirteen races for Hixson, with one top-five, a third place finish at Springfield. In the following year, he only ran the two dirt events, and finished in the top-five in both events. He entered in both races the following year in 2007, driving for Darrell Basham in the No. 94 Chevrolet, finishing 29th due to a crash at Springfield, and failing to qualify at DuQuoin.

After not running in ARCA competition in 2008, Cooksey returned to the ARCA circuit in 2009, driving three races in his self-owned No. 51 Chevrolet, and finished seventh at DuQuoin. After a one-year absence, he ran only one race at DuQuoin, finishing nineteenth. In the following year, he ran at Springfield, finishing 33rd due to an engine problem.

After not running in the series in the next three years, Cooksey ran at DuQuoin driving for Hixson in their No. 2 entry, finishing eighth. He would run both dirt events the following year, finishing ninth at DuQuoin. In 2018, he ran both dirt races as well as the race at Nashville Fairgrounds Speedway, and finished ninth at DuQuoin again. After another three-year absence from the series, he returned to DuQuoin in 2022, driving the No. 11 Toyota for Fast Track Racing; he finished eighth in the race.

== Motorsports results ==
=== NASCAR ===
(key) (Bold – Pole position awarded by qualifying time. Italics – Pole position earned by points standings or practice time. * – Most laps led.)

==== Busch Series ====
NASCAR Busch Series results
Year	Team	No.	Make	1	2	3	4	5	6	7	8	9	10	11	12	13	14	15	16	17	18	19	20	21	22	23	24	25	26	27	28	29	30	31	32	33	NBSC	Pts	Ref
2001	Maurtco Motorsports	73	Chevy	DAY	CAR	LVS	ATL	DAR	BRI	TEX	NSH	TAL	CAL	RCH	NHA	NZH	CLT	DOV	KEN	MLW	GLN	CHI	GTY; 29	PPR	IRP; 43	MCH	BRI	DAR	RCH	DOV	KAN	CLT	MEM; 29	PHO	CAR	HOM	83th	186	

==== Craftsman Truck Series ====
NASCAR Craftsman Truck Series results
Year	Team	No.	Make	1	2	3	4	5	6	7	8	9	10	11	12	13	14	15	16	17	18	19	20	21	22	NCTC	Pts	Ref
2002	Maurtco Motorsports	59	Chevy	DAY	DAR	MAR	GTY; 23	PPR	DOV	TEX	MEM; DNQ	MLW	KAN	KEN	NHA	MCH	IRP	NSH	RCH	TEX	SBO	LVS	CAL	PHO	HOM	83rd	94	

=== ARCA Menards Series ===
(key) (Bold – Pole position awarded by qualifying time. Italics – Pole position earned by points standings or practice time. * – Most laps led.)

ARCA Menards Series results
Year	Team	No.	Make	1	2	3	4	5	6	7	8	9	10	11	12	13	14	15	16	17	18	19	20	21	22	23	24	25	AMSC	Pts	Ref
1996	Cooksey Racing	41	Buick	DAY	ATL	SLM; 22	TAL	FIF												INF; 6	SBS								N/A	-	
1996	Cooksey Racing	51	Buick						LVL; 7	CLT	CLT	KIL	FRS	POC	MCH	FRS; 13	TOL; 8	POC	MCH			ISF; 30	DSF; 9	KIL	SLM; 10				N/A	-	
1996	Cooksey Racing	51	Chevy																							WIN; 13	CLT	ATL	N/A	-	
1997	Cooksey Racing	51	Chevy	DAY	ATL	SLM; 14	CLT	CLT	POC	MCH	SBS; 9	TOL; 11	KIL; 12	FRS; 10	MIN; 22	POC	MCH	DSF; 7		SLM; 12	WIN; 8	CLT	TAL	ISF; 17					12th	2305	
1997	Cooksey Racing	51	Pontiac																GTW; 14										12th	2305	
1997	Mike Lorz	76	Pontiac																						ATL; 20				12th	2305	
1998	Cooksey Racing	51	Chevy	DAY	ATL	SLM; 10		MEM; 9			SBS; 12	TOL; 16			KIL; 6	FRS; 9	ISF; 9		DSF; 8	SLM; 9		WIN; 3							11th	3550	
1998	Cooksey Racing	51	Pontiac				CLT; 28		MCH; 27	POC			PPR; 15	POC				ATL; 19			TEX; 8		CLT; 18	TAL; 18	ATL; 16				11th	3550	
1999	Cooksey Racing	51	Chevy	DAY; 28	ATL; 14	SLM; 5	AND; 6	CLT; 17	MCH; 38	POC; 13	TOL; 9	SBS; 13	BLN; 3	POC; 21	KIL; 6	FRS; 2	FLM; 12		WIN; 6		SLM; 10	CLT; 22	TAL; 7	ATL; 13					4th	4855	
1999	Cooksey Racing	51	Pontiac															ISF; 5		DSF; 6									4th	4855	
2000	Maurtco Motorsports	51	Chevy	DAY; 17	SLM; 5	AND; 21	CLT; 35	KIL; 24	FRS; 27	MCH; 25	POC; 11	TOL; 8	KEN; 33	BLN; 23	POC; 12	WIN; 19	ISF; 3	KEN; 16	**DSF**; 4	SLM; 7	CLT; 22	TAL; 14	ATL; 12						9th	3965	
2001	Cooksey Motorsports	51	Chevy	DAY; 13	NSH; 28	WIN; 8		GTY; 10	KEN; 15	CLT	KAN	MCH	POC	MEM; 9	GLN	KEN	MCH	POC	NSH	ISF; 8	CHI	DSF; 5	SLM	TOL	BLN	CLT	TAL	ATL	24th	1735	
2001	Cooksey Motorsports	57	Chevy				SLM; 21																						24th	1735	
2002	Cooksey Motorsports	51	Chevy	DAY; 13	ATL	NSH	SLM	KEN	CLT	KAN	POC	MCH	TOL	SBO	KEN	BLN	POC	NSH	ISF; 4	WIN	DSF; 5	CHI	SLM	TAL	CLT				48th	580	
2003	Cooksey Motorsports	51	Chevy	DAY	ATL	NSH	SLM; 7	TOL	KEN; 7	CLT	BLN; 12	KAN	MCH	LER; 28	POC	POC; 18	NSH	ISF; 18	WIN	DSF; 3	CHI	SLM	TAL	CLT	SBO				23rd	1145	
2004	Cooksey Motorsports	51	Chevy	DAY	NSH	SLM; 6	KEN	TOL																					15th	3700	
2004	Hixson Motorsports	23	Chevy						CLT; 34	KAN; 22	POC; 12	MCH; 15								ISF; 12		DSF; 9							15th	3700	
2004	Hixson Motorsports	23	Pontiac										SBO; 5	BLN; 8	KEN; 16	GTW; 17	POC; 13	LER; 13	NSH; 20		TOL; 6		CHI; 12	SLM; 32	TAL; 36				15th	3700	
2005	Hixson Motorsports	23	Chevy	DAY; 23	NSH; 18	SLM; 24		TOL; 28													ISF; 3	TOL	DSF; 14	CHI	SLM	TAL			27th	1720	
2005	Hixson Motorsports	23	Pontiac				KEN; 32		LAN; 34	MIL; 17		MCH; 21	KAN	KEN	BLN	POC	GTW; 30	LER; 29	NSH	MCH; DNQ									27th	1720	
2005	Hixson Motorsports	2	Pontiac								POC; 36																		27th	1720	
2006	Chuck Weber Racing	24	Chevy	DAY	NSH	SLM	WIN	KEN	TOL	POC	MCH	KAN	KEN	BLN	POC	GTW	NSH	MCH	ISF; 5	MIL	TOL								76th	420	
2006	Eddie Sharp Racing	2	Chevy																			DSF; 3	CHI	SLM	TAL	IOW			76th	420	
2007	Darrell Basham Racing	94	Chevy	DAY	USA	NSH	SLM	KAN	WIN	KEN	TOL	IOW	POC	MCH	BLN	KEN	POC	NSH	ISF; 29	MIL	GTW	DSF; DNQ	CHI	SLM	TAL	TOL			145th	110	
2009	Joe Cooksey Racing	51	Chevy	DAY	SLM	CAR	TAL	KEN	TOL	POC	MCH	MFD; 13	IOW	KEN	BLN	POC	ISF; 11	CHI	TOL	DSF; 7	NJE	SLM	KAN	CAR					57th	535	
2011	Joe Cooksey Racing	15	Chevy	DAY	TAL	SLM	TOL	NJE	CHI	POC	MCH	WIN	BLN	IOW	IRP	POC	ISF	MAD	DSF; 19	SLM	KAN	TOL							122nd	135	
2012	Joe Cooksey Racing	3	Chevy	DAY	MOB	SLM	TAL	TOL	ELK	POC	MCH	WIN	NJE	IOW	CHI	IRP	POC	BLN	ISF; 33	MAD	SLM	DSF	KAN						141st	65	
2016	Hixson Motorsports	2	Chevy	DAY	NSH	SLM	TAL	TOL	NJE	POC	MCH	MAD	WIN	IOW	IRP	POC	BLN	ISF	DSF; 8	SLM	CHI	KEN	KAN						96th	190	
2017	Hixson Motorsports	3	Ford	DAY	NSH	SLM	TAL	TOL	ELK	POC	MCH	MAD	IOW	IRP	POC	WIN	ISF; 12	ROA	DSF; 9	SLM	CHI	KEN	KAN						53rd	355	
2018	Hixson Motorsports	3	Ford	DAY	NSH; 21	SLM	TAL	TOL	CLT	POC	MCH	MAD	GTW	CHI	IOW	ELK	POC	ISF; 11	BLN	DSF; 9	SLM	IRP	KAN						41st	490	
2022	Fast Track Racing	10	Toyota	DAY	PHO	TAL	KAN	CLT	IOW	BLN	ELK	MOH	POC	IRP	MCH	GLN	ISF	MLW	DSF; 8	KAN	BRI	SLM	TOL						82nd	36	
2025	Clubb Racing Inc.	86	Ford	DAY	PHO	TAL	KAN	CLT	MCH	BLN	ELK	LRP	DOV	IRP	IOW	GLN	ISF; 14	MAD	DSF	BRI	SLM	KAN	TOL						111th	30	
