= Dill Whittymore =

American racing driver

- Born: January 16, 1959 (age 67); Seymour, Indiana, U.S.

ARCA Menards Series career
- 83 races run over 7 years
- Best finish: 6th (1995), (1996)
- First race: 1994 Louisville 250 (Louisville)
- Last race: 2000 Kil-Kare ARCA 150 (Kil-Kare)
Wins	Top tens	Poles
0	28	1
- Statistics up to date as of November 29, 2024.

Dill Whittymore (born January 16, 1959) is an American former professional stock car racing driver who has previously competed in the ARCA Bondo/Mar-Hyde Series from 1994 to 2000.

Whittymore has also competed in the ASA CRA Super Series and the Iceman Super Car Series.

== Motorsports career results ==
=== ARCA Bondo/Mar-Hyde Series ===
(key) (Bold – Pole position awarded by qualifying time. Italics – Pole position earned by points standings or practice time. * – Most laps led. ** – All laps led.)

ARCA Bondo/Mar-Hyde Series results
Year	Team	No.	Make	1	2	3	4	5	6	7	8	9	10	11	12	13	14	15	16	17	18	19	20	21	22	23	24	25	ABMHSC	Pts	Ref
1994	Dill Whittymore	56	Olds	DAY	TAL	FIF	LVL; 11	KIL	TOL	FRS	MCH	DMS	POC	POC	KIL	FRS	INF; 34	I70	ISF	DSF	TOL	SLM; 5	WIN; 18	ATL					N/A	0	
1995	Dill Whittymore	56	Chevy	DAY; 19		TAL; 26	FIF; 14	KIL; 7	FRS; 11	MCH; 21		MCS; 3	FRS; 5		POC; 12	KIL; 6	FRS; 10	SBS; 12	LVL; 21			SLM; 2	WIN; 3	ATL; 17					6th	4870	
1995	Dill Whittymore	56	Olds		ATL; 17									POC; 17															6th	4870	
1995	Dill Whittymore	56	Buick								I80; 10									ISF; 10	DSF; 17								6th	4870	
1996	Dill Whittymore	56	Chevy	DAY; 32	ATL; 16	**SLM**; 3	TAL; 30	FIF; 6	LVL; 19	CLT; 13	CLT; 15	KIL; 14	FRS; 6	POC; 24	MCH; 5	FRS; 11	TOL; 18	POC; 21	MCH; 19	INF; 29	SBS	ISF	DSF	KIL; 5	SLM; 9	WIN; 5	CLT; 8	ATL; 39	6th	4475	
1997	Dill Whittymore	56	Chevy	DAY; 27	ATL; 27	SLM; 19	CLT; 26	CLT; 27	POC	MCH	SBS	TOL	KIL	FRS	MIN	POC	MCH	DSF	GTW	SLM; 30	WIN	CLT	TAL	ISF	ATL				N/A	0	
1998	Dill Whittymore	56	Chevy	DAY	ATL	SLM; 21	CLT	MEM	MCH	POC	SBS	TOL; 6	PPR; 4	POC	KIL	FRS	ISF	ATL	DSF	SLM; 6	TEX	WIN; 19	CLT	TAL; 31	ATL				N/A	0	
1999	Dill Whittymore	56	Chevy	DAY; 34	ATL; 9	SLM; 3	AND; 18	CLT; 40	MCH; 17	POC; 37	TOL; 6	SBS; 6	BLN; 28	POC; 29	KIL; 4	FRS; 8	FLM; 10	ISF; 30	WIN; 27	DSF; 12	SLM; 26	CLT; DNQ	TAL; 22	ATL; 14					12th	3485	
2000	Dill Whittymore	56	Chevy	DAY; 25	SLM; 29	AND; 24	CLT; DNQ	KIL; 27	FRS; DNQ	MCH	POC	TOL	KEN	BLN	POC	WIN	ISF	KEN	DSF	SLM	CLT	TAL	ATL						43rd	710	
