= 2000 Pocono 500 =

15th race of the 2000 NASCAR Winston Cup Series

Race details
- Race 15 of 36 in the 2000 NASCAR Winston Cup Series
- The 2000 Pocono 500 program cover.
- Date: June 19, 2000
- Official name: 19th Annual Pocono 500
- Location: Long Pond, Pennsylvania, Pocono Raceway
- Course: Permanent racing facility
- Course length: 2.5 miles (4.0 km)
- Distance: 200 laps, 500 mi (804.672 km)
- Average speed: 139.741 miles per hour (224.891 km/h)
- Attendance: 75,000

Pole position
Driver	Rusty Wallace	Penske-Kranefuss Racing
- Time: 52.440

Most laps led
Driver	Rusty Wallace	Penske-Kranefuss Racing
- Laps: 107

Winner
No. 12	Jeremy Mayfield	Penske-Kranefuss Racing

Television in the United States
- Network: TNN
- Announcers: Eli Gold, Buddy Baker

Radio in the United States
- Radio: Motor Racing Network

The 2000 Pocono 500 was the 15th stock car race of the 2000 NASCAR Winston Cup Series and the 19th iteration of the event. The race was originally scheduled to be held on Sunday, June 18, 2000, but was delayed by one day due to rain. The race was held before an audience of 75,000 in Long Pond, Pennsylvania, at Pocono Raceway, a 2.5 miles (4.0 km) triangular permanent course. The race took the scheduled 200 laps to complete.

In the final laps of the race, Penske-Kranefuss Racing's Jeremy Mayfield engaged in a battle with Richard Childress Racing's Dale Earnhardt for the lead. Heading into the final lap of the race, Mayfield performed a bump and run maneuver on Earnhardt, allowing Mayfield to take the victory. The victory was Mayfield's third career NASCAR Winston Cup Series victory and his second and final victory of the season. To fill out the top three, Dale Jarrett and Ricky Rudd, both drivers for Robert Yates Racing, finished second and third, respectively.

== Background ==
The layout of Pocono International Raceway, the venue where the race was held.

The race was held at Pocono Raceway, which is a three-turn superspeedway located in Long Pond, Pennsylvania. Pocono International Raceway is one of a very few NASCAR tracks not owned by either Speedway Motorsports, Inc. or International Speedway Corporation. It is operated by the Igdalsky siblings Brandon, Nicholas, and sister Ashley, and cousins Joseph IV and Chase Mattioli, all of whom are third-generation members of the family-owned Mattco Inc, started by Joseph II and Rose Mattioli.

Outside of the NASCAR races, the track is used throughout the year by the Sports Car Club of America (SCCA) and motorcycle clubs as well as racing schools and an IndyCar race. The triangular oval also has three separate infield sections of racetrack – North Course, East Course and South Course. Each of these infield sections use a separate portion of the tri-oval to complete the track. During regular non-race weekends, multiple clubs can use the track by running on different infield sections. Also some of the infield sections can be run in either direction, or multiple infield sections can be put together – such as running the North Course and the South Course and using the tri-oval to connect the two.

=== Entry list ===
- (R) denotes rookie driver.

#	Driver	Team	Make
1	Steve Park	Dale Earnhardt, Inc.	Chevrolet
2	Rusty Wallace	Penske-Kranefuss Racing	Ford
3	Dale Earnhardt	Richard Childress Racing	Chevrolet
4	Bobby Hamilton	Morgan–McClure Motorsports	Chevrolet
5	Terry Labonte	Hendrick Motorsports	Chevrolet
6	Mark Martin	Roush Racing	Ford
7	Michael Waltrip	Mattei Motorsports	Chevrolet
8	Dale Earnhardt Jr. (R)	Dale Earnhardt, Inc.	Chevrolet
9	Stacy Compton (R)	Melling Racing	Ford
10	Johnny Benson Jr.	Tyler Jet Motorsports	Pontiac
11	Brett Bodine	Brett Bodine Racing	Ford
12	Jeremy Mayfield	Penske-Kranefuss Racing	Ford
14	Rick Mast	A. J. Foyt Enterprises	Pontiac
16	Kevin Lepage	Roush Racing	Ford
17	Matt Kenseth (R)	Roush Racing	Ford
18	Bobby Labonte	Joe Gibbs Racing	Pontiac
20	Tony Stewart	Joe Gibbs Racing	Pontiac
21	Elliott Sadler	Wood Brothers Racing	Ford
22	Ward Burton	Bill Davis Racing	Pontiac
24	Jeff Gordon	Hendrick Motorsports	Chevrolet
25	Jerry Nadeau	Hendrick Motorsports	Chevrolet
26	Jimmy Spencer	Haas-Carter Motorsports	Ford
27	Mike Bliss (R)	Eel River Racing	Pontiac
28	Ricky Rudd	Robert Yates Racing	Ford
31	Mike Skinner	Richard Childress Racing	Chevrolet
32	Scott Pruett (R)	PPI Motorsports	Ford
33	Joe Nemechek	Andy Petree Racing	Chevrolet
36	Ken Schrader	MB2 Motorsports	Pontiac
40	Sterling Marlin	Team SABCO	Chevrolet
42	Kenny Irwin Jr.	Team SABCO	Chevrolet
43	John Andretti	Petty Enterprises	Pontiac
44	Kyle Petty	Petty Enterprises	Pontiac
52	Bill Baird	Baird Motorsports	Chevrolet
55	Kenny Wallace	Andy Petree Racing	Chevrolet
60	Geoff Bodine	Joe Bessey Racing	Chevrolet
66	Darrell Waltrip	Haas-Carter Motorsports	Ford
71	Dave Marcis	Marcis Auto Racing	Chevrolet
72	Dwayne Leik	Marcis Auto Racing	Chevrolet
75	Wally Dallenbach Jr.	Galaxy Motorsports	Ford
77	Robert Pressley	Jasper Motorsports	Ford
88	Dale Jarrett	Robert Yates Racing	Ford
90	Ed Berrier (R)	Donlavey Racing	Ford
93	Dave Blaney (R)	Bill Davis Racing	Pontiac
94	Bill Elliott	Bill Elliott Racing	Ford
97	Chad Little	Roush Racing	Ford
99	Jeff Burton	Roush Racing	Ford
Official entry list

== Practice ==
=== First practice ===
The first practice session was held on Friday, June 16, at 11:00 AM EST. The session lasted for three hours. Penske-Kranefuss Racing's Rusty Wallace set the fastest time in the session, with a lap of 52.557 and an average speed of 171.243 mph (275.589 km/h).

Pos.	#	Driver	Team	Make	Time	Speed
1	2	Rusty Wallace	Penske-Kranefuss Racing	Ford	52.557	171.243
2	28	Ricky Rudd	Robert Yates Racing	Ford	52.849	170.297
3	6	Mark Martin	Roush Racing	Ford	52.871	170.226
Full first practice results

=== Second practice ===
The second practice session was held on Saturday, June 17, at 9:30 AM EST. The session lasted for one hour and 20 minutes. Joe Bessey Racing's Geoff Bodine set the fastest time in the session, with a lap of 53.867 and an average speed of 167.078 mph (268.886 km/h).

Pos.	#	Driver	Team	Make	Time	Speed
1	60	Geoff Bodine	Joe Bessey Racing	Chevrolet	53.867	167.078
2	27	Mike Bliss (R)	Eel River Racing	Pontiac	53.902	166.970
3	12	Jeremy Mayfield	Penske-Kranefuss Racing	Ford	53.904	166.963
Full second practice results

=== Final practice ===
The final practice session, sometimes referred to as Happy Hour, was held on Saturday, June 17, after the preliminary 2000 Pocono ARCA 200. The session lasted for one hour. Robert Yates Racing's Ricky Rudd set the fastest time in the session, with a lap of 54.412 and an average speed of 165.405 mph (266.194 km/h).

Pos.	#	Driver	Team	Make	Time	Speed
1	28	Ricky Rudd	Robert Yates Racing	Ford	54.412	165.405
2	12	Jeremy Mayfield	Penske-Kranefuss Racing	Ford	54.443	165.311
3	36	Ken Schrader	MB2 Motorsports	Pontiac	54.594	164.853
Full Happy Hour practice results

== Qualifying ==
Qualifying was split into two rounds. The first round was held on Friday, June 16, at 3:00 PM EST. Each driver had two laps to set a fastest time; the fastest of the two counted as their official qualifying lap. During the first round, the top 25 drivers in the round was guaranteed a starting spot in the race. If a driver was not able to guarantee a spot in the first round, they had the option to scrub their time from the first round and try and run a faster lap time in a second round qualifying run, held on Saturday, June 17, at 11:30 AM EST. As with the first round, each driver had two laps to set a fastest time; the fastest of the two would count as their official qualifying lap. Positions 26–36 were decided on time, while positions 37–43 were based on provisionals. Six spots were awarded by the use of provisionals based on owner's points. The seventh was awarded to a past champion who has not otherwise qualified for the race. If no past champion needs the provisional, the next team in the owner points was awarded a provisional.

Rusty Wallace, driving for Penske-Kranefuss Racing, managed to win the pole, setting a time of 52.440 and an average speed of 171.625 miles per hour (276.204 km/h) in the first round.

Three drivers failed to qualify.

=== Full qualifying results ===
Pos.	#	Driver	Team	Make	Time	Speed
1	2	Rusty Wallace	Penske-Kranefuss Racing	Ford	52.440	171.625
2	43	John Andretti	Petty Enterprises	Pontiac	52.551	171.262
3	28	Ricky Rudd	Robert Yates Racing	Ford	52.687	170.820
4	88	Dale Jarrett	Robert Yates Racing	Ford	52.697	170.788
5	24	Jeff Gordon	Hendrick Motorsports	Chevrolet	52.724	170.700
6	6	Mark Martin	Roush Racing	Ford	52.728	170.687
7	31	Mike Skinner	Richard Childress Racing	Chevrolet	52.748	170.623
8	99	Jeff Burton	Roush Racing	Ford	52.751	170.613
9	20	Tony Stewart	Joe Gibbs Racing	Pontiac	52.761	170.581
10	33	Joe Nemechek	Andy Petree Racing	Chevrolet	52.816	170.403
11	18	Bobby Labonte	Joe Gibbs Racing	Pontiac	52.832	170.351
12	7	Michael Waltrip	Mattei Motorsports	Chevrolet	52.901	170.129
13	14	Rick Mast	A. J. Foyt Racing	Pontiac	52.938	170.010
14	5	Terry Labonte	Hendrick Motorsports	Chevrolet	52.949	169.975
15	8	Dale Earnhardt Jr. (R)	Dale Earnhardt, Inc.	Chevrolet	53.009	169.782
16	3	Dale Earnhardt	Richard Childress Racing	Chevrolet	53.053	169.642
17	75	Wally Dallenbach Jr.	Galaxy Motorsports	Ford	53.208	169.147
18	16	Kevin Lepage	Roush Racing	Ford	53.212	169.135
19	36	Ken Schrader	MB2 Motorsports	Pontiac	53.219	169.113
20	11	Brett Bodine	Brett Bodine Racing	Ford	53.229	169.081
21	10	Johnny Benson Jr.	Tyler Jet Motorsports	Pontiac	53.242	169.039
22	12	Jeremy Mayfield	Penske-Kranefuss Racing	Ford	53.257	168.992
23	44	Kyle Petty	Petty Enterprises	Pontiac	53.258	168.989
24	55	Kenny Wallace	Andy Petree Racing	Chevrolet	53.267	168.960
25	94	Bill Elliott	Bill Elliott Racing	Ford	53.273	168.941
Failed to lock in the first round
26	25	Jerry Nadeau	Hendrick Motorsports	Chevrolet	53.275	168.935
27	1	Steve Park	Dale Earnhardt, Inc.	Chevrolet	53.370	168.634
28	77	Robert Pressley	Jasper Motorsports	Ford	53.455	168.366
29	17	Matt Kenseth (R)	Roush Racing	Ford	53.463	168.341
30	21	Elliott Sadler	Wood Brothers Racing	Ford	53.485	168.271
31	40	Sterling Marlin	Team SABCO	Chevrolet	53.568	168.011
32	22	Ward Burton	Bill Davis Racing	Pontiac	53.604	167.898
33	4	Bobby Hamilton	Morgan–McClure Motorsports	Chevrolet	53.623	167.838
34	26	Jimmy Spencer	Haas-Carter Motorsports	Ford	53.807	167.264
35	93	Dave Blaney (R)	Bill Davis Racing	Pontiac	53.827	167.202
36	27	Mike Bliss (R)	Eel River Racing	Pontiac	53.828	167.199
Provisionals
37	97	Chad Little	Roush Racing	Ford	54.227	165.969
38	42	Kenny Irwin Jr.	Team SABCO	Chevrolet	54.076	166.432
39	9	Stacy Compton (R)	Melling Racing	Ford	53.880	167.038
40	60	Geoff Bodine	Joe Bessey Racing	Chevrolet	53.984	166.716
41	32	Scott Pruett (R)	PPI Motorsports	Ford	54.199	166.055
42	90	Ed Berrier (R)	Donlavey Racing	Ford	54.189	166.085
43	71	Dave Marcis	Marcis Auto Racing	Chevrolet	54.285	165.792
Failed to qualify
44	66	Darrell Waltrip	Haas-Carter Motorsports	Ford	53.859	167.103
45	72	Dwayne Leik	Marcis Auto Racing	Chevrolet	55.569	161.961
46	52	Bill Baird	Baird Motorsports	Chevrolet	-	-
Official first round qualifying results
Official starting lineup

== Race results ==
Fin	St	#	Driver	Team	Make	Laps	Led	Status	Pts	Winnings
1	22	12	Jeremy Mayfield	Penske-Kranefuss Racing	Ford	200	9	running	180	$121,020
2	4	88	Dale Jarrett	Robert Yates Racing	Ford	200	0	running	170	$131,520
3	3	28	Ricky Rudd	Robert Yates Racing	Ford	200	0	running	165	$95,870
4	16	3	Dale Earnhardt	Richard Childress Racing	Chevrolet	200	17	running	165	$87,495
5	6	6	Mark Martin	Roush Racing	Ford	200	1	running	160	$71,565
6	9	20	Tony Stewart	Joe Gibbs Racing	Pontiac	200	38	running	155	$73,490
7	8	99	Jeff Burton	Roush Racing	Ford	200	2	running	151	$67,015
8	5	24	Jeff Gordon	Hendrick Motorsports	Chevrolet	200	0	running	142	$64,765
9	7	31	Mike Skinner	Richard Childress Racing	Chevrolet	200	17	running	143	$54,265
10	1	2	Rusty Wallace	Penske-Kranefuss Racing	Ford	200	107	running	144	$76,990
11	28	77	Robert Pressley	Jasper Motorsports	Ford	200	0	running	130	$51,465
12	14	5	Terry Labonte	Hendrick Motorsports	Chevrolet	200	0	running	127	$55,415
13	11	18	Bobby Labonte	Joe Gibbs Racing	Pontiac	200	0	running	124	$55,965
14	29	17	Matt Kenseth (R)	Roush Racing	Ford	200	0	running	121	$48,665
15	27	1	Steve Park	Dale Earnhardt, Inc.	Chevrolet	200	0	running	118	$48,765
16	30	21	Elliott Sadler	Wood Brothers Racing	Ford	200	0	running	115	$49,065
17	37	97	Chad Little	Roush Racing	Ford	200	0	running	112	$46,465
18	19	36	Ken Schrader	MB2 Motorsports	Pontiac	200	0	running	109	$38,065
19	15	8	Dale Earnhardt Jr. (R)	Dale Earnhardt, Inc.	Chevrolet	200	0	running	106	$44,015
20	26	25	Jerry Nadeau	Hendrick Motorsports	Chevrolet	200	1	running	108	$48,890
21	2	43	John Andretti	Petty Enterprises	Pontiac	199	0	running	100	$55,365
22	31	40	Sterling Marlin	Team SABCO	Chevrolet	199	0	running	97	$46,665
23	24	55	Kenny Wallace	Andy Petree Racing	Chevrolet	199	0	running	94	$45,740
24	40	60	Geoff Bodine	Joe Bessey Racing	Chevrolet	199	0	running	91	$44,390
25	38	42	Kenny Irwin Jr.	Team SABCO	Chevrolet	199	0	running	88	$44,515
26	18	16	Kevin Lepage	Roush Racing	Ford	199	2	running	90	$43,865
27	32	22	Ward Burton	Bill Davis Racing	Pontiac	199	0	running	82	$50,515
28	42	90	Ed Berrier (R)	Donlavey Racing	Ford	198	0	running	79	$32,365
29	43	71	Dave Marcis	Marcis Auto Racing	Chevrolet	197	0	running	76	$32,190
30	35	93	Dave Blaney (R)	Bill Davis Racing	Pontiac	195	0	running	73	$32,040
31	41	32	Scott Pruett (R)	PPI Motorsports	Ford	194	0	running	70	$32,390
32	20	11	Brett Bodine	Brett Bodine Racing	Ford	182	4	engine	72	$31,740
33	36	27	Mike Bliss (R)	Eel River Racing	Pontiac	181	0	accident	64	$31,540
34	21	10	Johnny Benson Jr.	Tyler Jet Motorsports	Pontiac	179	0	engine	61	$34,465
35	13	14	Rick Mast	A. J. Foyt Racing	Pontiac	179	0	running	58	$31,190
36	34	26	Jimmy Spencer	Haas-Carter Motorsports	Ford	178	0	engine	55	$41,990
37	39	9	Stacy Compton (R)	Melling Racing	Ford	175	0	running	52	$33,825
38	25	94	Bill Elliott	Bill Elliott Racing	Ford	169	0	engine	49	$41,200
39	17	75	Wally Dallenbach Jr.	Galaxy Motorsports	Ford	156	0	accident	46	$30,575
40	33	4	Bobby Hamilton	Morgan–McClure Motorsports	Chevrolet	154	0	engine	43	$38,425
41	23	44	Kyle Petty	Petty Enterprises	Pontiac	144	2	engine	45	$38,300
42	10	33	Joe Nemechek	Andy Petree Racing	Chevrolet	127	0	engine	37	$38,225
43	12	7	Michael Waltrip	Mattei Motorsports	Chevrolet	35	0	engine	34	$38,150
Failed to qualify
44		66	Darrell Waltrip	Haas-Carter Motorsports	Ford					
45		72	Dwayne Leik	Marcis Auto Racing	Chevrolet					
46		52	Bill Baird	Baird Motorsports	Chevrolet					
Official race results

== Standings after the race ==
Drivers' Championship standings

	Pos	Driver	Points
	1	Bobby Labonte	2,240
1	2	Dale Earnhardt	2,183 (−57)
1	3	Dale Jarrett	2,125 (−115)
2	4	Ward Burton	2,096 (−144)
	5	Jeff Burton	2,019 (−221)
	6	Rusty Wallace	1,999 (−241)
	7	Tony Stewart	1,976 (−264)
	8	Ricky Rudd	1,975 (−265)
	9	Mark Martin	1,958 (−282)
	10	Jeff Gordon	1,874 (−366)
Official driver's standings

- Note: Only the first 10 positions are included for the driver standings.

Previous race: 2000 Kmart 400	NASCAR Winston Cup Series; 2000 season	Next race: 2000 Save Mart/Kragen 350
