= Bill Baird (racing driver) =

American race car driver

William Baird
- Born: July 26, 1949 (age 77) Sturgis, Kentucky, U.S.

ARCA Racing Series
- Years active: 1997-2010
- Starts: 70
- Wins: 6
- Poles: 8
- Best finish: 1st in 1999

Championship titles
- 1999: ARCA Bondo/Mar-Hyde Series

Awards
- 1998: ARCA Bondo/Mar-Hyde Series Rookie of the Year

Bill Baird (born July 26, 1949) is an American race car driver. He currently competes in the Ultra4 Racing Series in the #5252 buggy. He is a former Rookie of the Year and champion of the ARCA Bondo/Mar-Hyde stock car Series, and owns Saturn Machine, a steel equipment manufacturer.

== Early career ==
Baird, an Air Force veteran, originally began as a stunt pilot hobbyist before later switching to racing in 1987. After starting on dirt oval tracks, he switched to pavement racetracks and competed regularly in the American Speed Association ACDelco Challenge Series.

== ARCA career ==
Baird debuted in the ARCA Bondo/Mar-Hyde Series in 1997, driving the No. 52 for Ken Schrader Racing with sponsorship from Saturn Machine and Spee Dee Pop Popcorn. He made four starts, with his best finish coming in his debut at Daytona International Speedway, where he started third and finished fourth. He made his first full-time bid at the ARCA championship the following season, winning two pole positions and nine top-ten finishes, on his way to a fourth place position in the points standings and the ARCA Rookie of the Year award. In 1999, Baird ran a full-time schedule for the second time, with additional sponsorship coming from Valvoline Eagle One, Baird won his first five races and the overall points championship.

The next season, Baird cut down to a part-time schedule, this time driving the No. 52 as an owner/driver. He made six starts and garnered three top-ten finishes, including a second at the Illinois State Fairgrounds. He also attempted the Pennsylvania 500 and Brickyard 400 in the NASCAR Winston Cup Series that season, but failed to qualify for both events. Following 2000, Baird reunited with Schrader but only attempted a handful of events in the ARCA series each year. He won an additional race at the Illinois State Fairgrounds in 2004, his final career ARCA victory to date. His most recent start in the ARCA series came in 2010 at Talladega Superspeedway, where he finished 27th after wrecking halfway through the race.

== Post-ARCA career ==
In 2011, Baird purchased an Ultra 4 Buggy from Campbell Enterprises, racing the rest of the 2011 Ultra 4 Series in preparation for the 2012 Griffin King of the Hammers. He was named the Ultra 4 Series Rookie of the Year that same season.

== Motorsports career results ==
=== NASCAR ===
(key) (Bold – Pole position awarded by qualifying time. Italics – Pole position earned by points standings or practice time. * – Most laps led.)

==== Winston Cup Series ====
NASCAR Winston Cup Series results
Year	Team	No.	Make	1	2	3	4	5	6	7	8	9	10	11	12	13	14	15	16	17	18	19	20	21	22	23	24	25	26	27	28	29	30	31	32	33	34	NWCC	Pts	Ref
2000	Baird Motorsports	52	Chevy	DAY	CAR	LVS	ATL	DAR	BRI	TEX	MAR	TAL	CAL	RCH	CLT	DOV	MCH	POC; DNQ	SON	DAY	NHA	POC	IND; DNQ	GLN	MCH	BRI	DAR	RCH	NHA	DOV	MAR	CLT	TAL	CAR	PHO	HOM	ATL	NA	-	

=== ARCA Racing Series ===
(key) (Bold – Pole position awarded by qualifying time. Italics – Pole position earned by points standings or practice time. * – Most laps led.)

ARCA Racing Series results
Year	Team	No.	Make	1	2	3	4	5	6	7	8	9	10	11	12	13	14	15	16	17	18	19	20	21	22	23	24	25	ARSC	Pts	Ref
1997	Baird Motorsports	52	Chevy	DAY; 4	ATL	SLM	CLT	CLT	POC	MCH	SBS	TOL	KIL	FRS	MIN	POC	MCH	DSF	GTW	SLM	WIN	CLT; 26	TAL; 20	ISF	ATL; 26				NA	-	
1998	Ken Schrader Racing	52	Chevy	**DAY**; 22	ATL; 34	SLM; 17	CLT; 38	MEM; 5	MCH; 8	POC; 10	SBS; 11	TOL; 27	PPR; 2	POC; 3	KIL; 11	FRS; 14	ISF; 22	ATL; 23	**DSF**; 2	SLM; 2	TEX; 2	WIN; 25	CLT; 35	TAL; 10	ATL; 11				4th	4880	
1999	Ken Schrader Racing	52	Chevy	DAY; 8	ATL; 1	**SLM**; 1	**AND**; 16	CLT; 11	MCH; 7	**POC**; 3	**TOL**; 2*	SBS; 1*	BLN; 2*	POC; 3	KIL; 22	**FRS**; 1*	**FLM**; 3	ISF; 1*	WIN; 3*	DSF; 2	**SLM**; 2	CLT; 5	TAL; 18	ATL; 7					1st	5920	
2000	Baird Motorsports	52	Chevy	DAY; 21	SLM; 7	AND; 29	CLT	KIL	FRS	MCH	POC	TOL	KEN	BLN			ISF; 2	KEN	DSF; 3	SLM	CLT	TAL	ATL						34th	1005	
2000	T.R.I.X. Racing	79	Chevy												POC; 17	WIN													34th	1005	
2001	Ken Schrader Racing	52	Chevy	DAY	NSH	WIN	SLM	GTY	KEN	CLT	KAN	MCH	POC	MEM	GLN	KEN	MCH	POC	NSH	ISF; DNQ	CHI	DSF; 3							111th	215	
2001	Ken Schrader Racing	99	Chevy																				SLM; QL^{†}	TOL	BLN	CLT	TAL	ATL	111th	215	
2002	Ken Schrader Racing	52	Chevy	DAY	ATL	NSH	SLM	KEN	CLT	KAN	POC	MCH	TOL	SBO	KEN	BLN	POC	NSH	ISF	WIN	DSF; 18	CHI	SLM	TAL	CLT				137th	140	
2004	Baird Motorsports	52	Chevy	DAY	NSH	SLM	KEN	TOL	CLT	KAN	POC	MCH	SBO	BLN	KEN	GTW	POC	LER	NSH	ISF; 1	TOL	DSF; 2	CHI	SLM	TAL				62nd	465	
2005	Baird Motorsports	52	Chevy	DAY	NSH	SLM	KEN	TOL	LAN	MIL	POC	MCH	KAN	KEN	BLN	POC	GTW	LER	NSH	MCH	ISF; 12	TOL	DSF; 9	CHI	SLM	TAL			81st	355	
2007	Baird Motorsports	52	Dodge	DAY; 12	USA; 37	NSH	SLM	KAN	WIN	KEN	TOL	IOW	POC	MCH	BLN	KEN	POC	NSH	ISF; 34	MIL	GTW				TAL; 19	TOL			55th	495	
2007	Hudson Motorsports	43	Dodge																			DSF; 29	CHI	SLM					55th	495	
2008	Ken Schrader Racing	52	Dodge	DAY; 3	SLM	IOW	KAN	CAR	KEN	TOL	POC	MCH	CAY	KEN	BLN	POC	NSH	ISF	DSF	CHI	SLM	NJE	TAL; 26	TOL					89th	215	
2009	Ken Schrader Racing	52	Chevy	DAY; 37	SLM	CAR	TAL; 2	KEN	TOL	POC	MCH	MFD	IOW	KEN	BLN	POC	ISF	CHI	TOL	DSF	NJE	SLM	KAN	CAR					88th	265	
2010	Ken Schrader Racing	52	Chevy	DAY; 36	PBE	SLM	TEX																						99th	145	
2010	Ken Schrader Racing	52	Toyota					TAL; 27	TOL	POC	MCH	IOW	MFD	POC	BLN	NJE	ISF	CHI	DSF	TOL	SLM	KAN	CAR						99th	145	
^{†} - Qualified for Ken Schrader.
