= Mike Lorz =

American racing driver

- Born: July 23, 1965 (age 61); Midlothian, Illinois, U.S.

ARCA Menards Series career
- 45 races run over 6 years
- Best finish: 14th (1996)
- First race: 1994 Winnebago 150 (Toledo)
- Last race: 1999 Southern Illinois 100 (DuQuoin)
Wins	Top tens	Poles
0	13	0
- Statistics up to date as of December 15, 2024.

Mike Lorz (born July 23, 1965) is an American former professional stock car racing driver who has previously competed in the ARCA Bondo/Mar-Hyde Series from 1994 to 1999.

Lorz has also previously competed in the ASA National Tour and the ARTGO Challenge Series.

Lorz owns and runs Lorz Racing Services in Midlothian, Illinois.

== Motorsports results ==
=== ARCA Bondo/Mar-Hyde Series ===
(key) (Bold – Pole position awarded by qualifying time. Italics – Pole position earned by points standings or practice time. * – Most laps led. ** – All laps led.)

ARCA Bondo/Mar-Hyde Series results
Year	Team	No.	Make	1	2	3	4	5	6	7	8	9	10	11	12	13	14	15	16	17	18	19	20	21	22	23	24	25	ABMHSC	Pts	Ref
1994	Lorz Motorsports	76	Pontiac	DAY	TAL	FIF	LVL	KIL	TOL	FRS	MCH	DMS	POC	POC	KIL	FRS	INF	I70	ISF	DSF	TOL; 11	SLM							N/A	0	
1994	Lorz Motorsports	99	Pontiac																				WIN; 14	ATL					N/A	0	
1995	Lorz Motorsports	99	Pontiac	DAY	ATL	TAL	FIF; 25	KIL; DNQ	FRS	MCH	I80	MCS	FRS; 22	POC	POC	KIL; 21	FRS; 27	SBS	LVL; 27	ISF	DSF	SLM; 8	WIN; 11	ATL					38th	910	
1996	Lorz Motorsports	99	Pontiac	DAY	ATL	SLM; 11	TAL		LVL; 17	CLT	CLT	KIL	FRS	POC	MCH	FRS; 10	TOL; 5	POC	MCH	INF; 11	SBS; 7	ISF; 10	DSF; 36	KIL; 23	SLM; 23	WIN; 10	CLT	ATL	14th	1810	
1996	Lorz Motorsports	89	Pontiac					FIF; 10																					14th	1810	
1997	Lorz Motorsports	76	Pontiac	DAY	ATL	SLM; 7	CLT	CLT	POC	MCH	SBS; 8	TOL; 7	KIL; 11	FRS; 21	MIN; 11	POC	MCH	DSF; 10	GTW; 30	SLM; 26	WIN; 15	CLT	TAL	ISF; 22	ATL				16th	1765	
1998	Lorz Motorsports	76	Pontiac	DAY	ATL	SLM; 26	CLT	MEM; 16	MCH	POC	SBS; 21	TOL	PPR	POC	KIL; DNQ	FRS	ISF; 10	ATL	DSF; 18	SLM	TEX	WIN; 23	CLT	TAL	ATL				N/A	0	
1999	Team Rensi Motorsports	83	Chevy	DAY	ATL	SLM; 9	AND; 13	CLT	MCH	POC																			30th	1065	
1999	Lorz Motorsports	76	Chevy								TOL; 31	SBS; 15	BLN; 17	POC	KIL	FRS	FLM	ISF; 14	WIN; 30	DSF; 26	SLM	CLT	TAL	ATL					30th	1065	
