= Scott Baker (racing driver) =

American racing driver

- Born: Scott Mitchell Baker; April 30, 1957; Chicago, Illinois, U. S.
- Died: June 23, 2000 (aged 43); Toledo, Ohio, U. S.
- Cause of death: Auto racing accident

ARCA Menards Series career
- 12 races run over 4 years
- First race: 1997 Eddie Gilstrap Fall Classic (Salem)
- Last race: 2000 Jasper Engines & Transmissions 150 Toledo)
Wins	Top tens	Poles
0	3	1
- Statistics up to date as of January 15, 2025.

Scott Mitchell Baker (April 30, 1957 – June 23, 2000) was an American professional stock car racing driver who competed in ARCA. He was not related to Buddy Baker or Buck Baker.

== Life and career ==
Baker was born in Chicago, Illinois in 1957 and graduated from Saugatuck High School in Saugatuck, Michigan, in 1975. He served in the United States Navy for six years prior to his racing career.

== Death ==
Baker died on June 23, 2000, after a crash in the Jasper Engines & Transmissions 150, an ARCA race at Toledo Speedway in Toledo, Ohio. Late in the race, Baker was running in the eighth position when he made contact with Joe Cooksey, which spun Baker into a tire barrier made of tractor tires. The seriousness of the crash caused the race to be called at 149 laps completed of the scheduled 150 with Frank Kimmel being declared the winner, and Baker placed in the sixteenth position. The impact caused his head and neck restraint to strain the arteries carrying oxygen to his brain. Baker, at the age of 43, was pronounced dead shortly after arriving at the hospital.
