= Flat Rock Speedway =

Race track in Michigan, USA

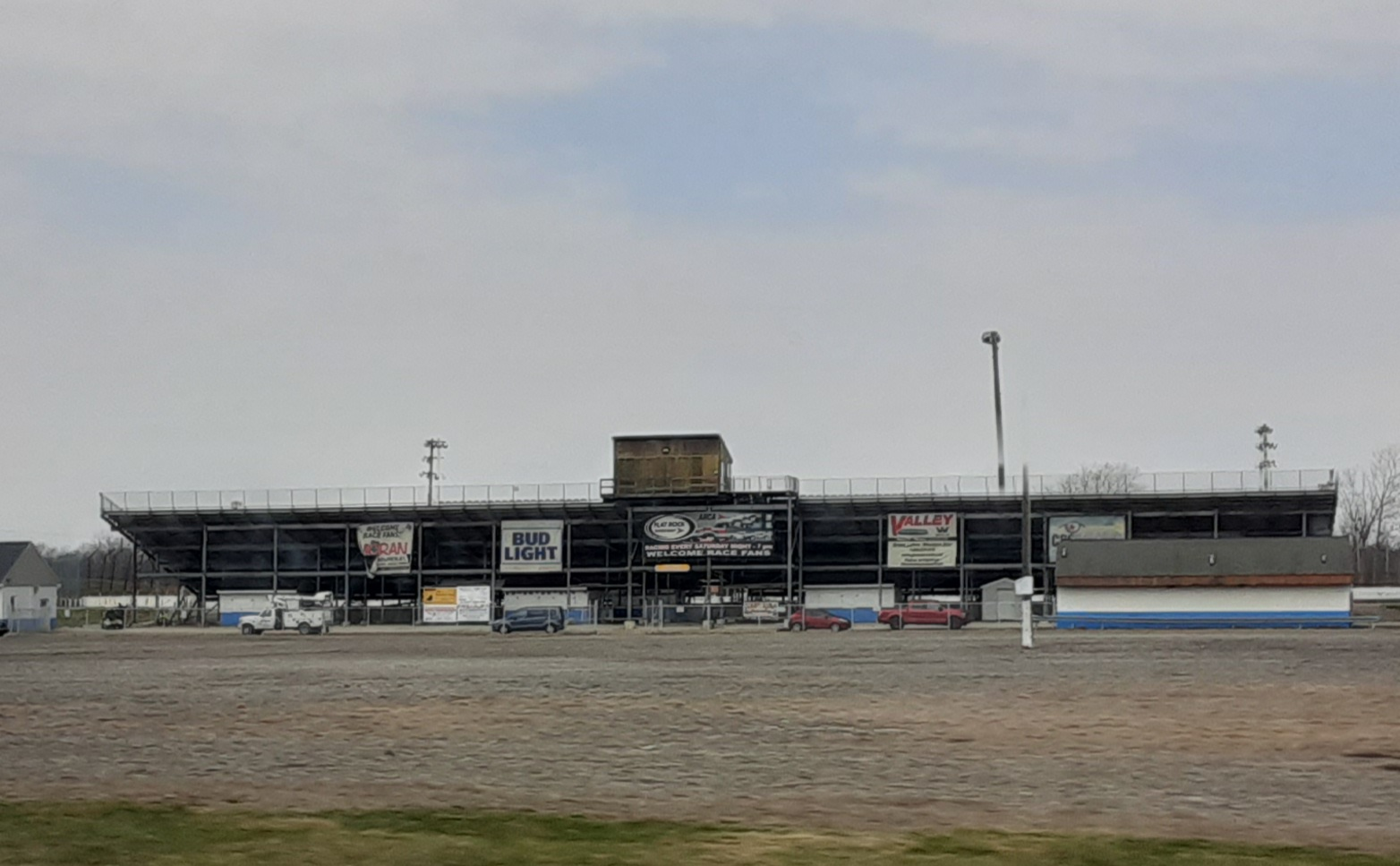
- Flat Rock Speedway in 2021
- Location: Ash Township, Michigan
- Coordinates: 42°04′54″N 83°18′24″W
- Owner: NASCAR (May 2018–present); ARCA (1961–2018)
- Broke ground: 1952
- Opened: 14 August 1953; 73 years ago
- Construction cost: US$350,000
- Architect: Sheldon Hayes
- Major events: Current: ARCA Menards Series East; Sunbelt Rentals 150 (2023–present); Former: ARCA Bondo/Mar-Hyde Series (1979–2000); NASCAR Convertible Series (1956)
- Website: http://www.flatrockspeedway.com

Oval (1953–present)
- Surface: Asphalt
- Length: 0.402 km (0.250 mi)
- Turns: 4
- Race lap record: 0:12.247 ( (United States) Max Reaves, Toyota Camry, 2026, ARCA Menards)

Flat Rock Speedway is a 0.250 mi (0.402 km) race track in Monroe County in the U.S. state of Michigan. It is located in Ash Township just south of the city of Flat Rock along U.S. Route 24. Opened in 1953, it is owned by NASCAR and is the sister track to Toledo Speedway. It features racing on Saturday nights that include Outlaw Body Late Models, Street Stocks, and Figure 8s for its weekly divisions. It is the closest NASCAR-style oval track racing circuit to Detroit, Michigan.

== History ==
Flat Rock Speedway was constructed in 1952, but financial issues led to the original investors backing out. Under Sheldon Hayes of the Cadillac Asphalt Company, the track was completed in 1953; using 70 tons of a mixture of rubber and asphalt, Hayes created a "rubberized" asphalt surface that was the first of its kind for a race track. The speedway opened on August 14. It was initially scheduled to open on August 7, but the opening was postponed by a week after a raccoon drowned in its drainage system and subsequent rain flooded the track.

Dick Good won Flat Rock's first track championship in the "Hardtop" division, which was rebranded as the Late Model class in 1954. That year, NASCAR founder and president Bill France Sr. became its promoter and helped attract NASCAR drivers like Curtis Turner, Joe Weatherly, and Lee Petty to the track. France left his position at the speedway in 1956. Motor City Speedway promoter Andy Barto served as Flat Rock's promoter until he stepped down in March 1956 and was replaced by Hayes, who was the track president, to commit his work to Motor City; Barto returned to Flat Rock as its general manager in 1959.

During the 1953 season, the Midwest Association for Race Cars (MARC) began racing at the track, with J. H. Petty winning the first races, consecutive 100-lap events on September 11. Late models were introduced in 1962.

Without NASCAR support, the track struggled in the late 1950s. In 1960, new general manager Joan Simmons created a points system and raised competitor numbers, leading to track attendance increasing by 81 percent. A year later, Simmons formally established ties with France's friend and MARC head John Marcum, who became track owner the following year. Marcum would later rename his sanctioning body the Automobile Racing Club of America (ARCA), whose Bondo/Mar-Hyde Series continued racing at Flat Rock until 2000, with Frank Kimmel winning the final ARCA premier series race at the track. Simmons remained in her position until 1970. Following Marcum's death in 1981, wife Mildred and grandson John Drager took over track operations; when John departed for other interests, brother Ron became track promoter.

In 1999, Drager purchased Toledo Speedway, connecting it to Flat Rock as a sister track. As part of their new relationship, Flat Rock's marketing division Marcum Productions assumed the same role at Toledo, while Scott Schultz served as general manager for both tracks.

== Races ==
=== ARCA Menards Series ===
The ARCA Menards Series first visited Flat Rock in 1979, then had an annual race from 1979 to 2000. The ARCA Menards Series East took over the in 2023 and held a race annually since.
