= Kil-Kare Raceway =

Race track

Coordinates: 39°42′23″N 83°58′24″W

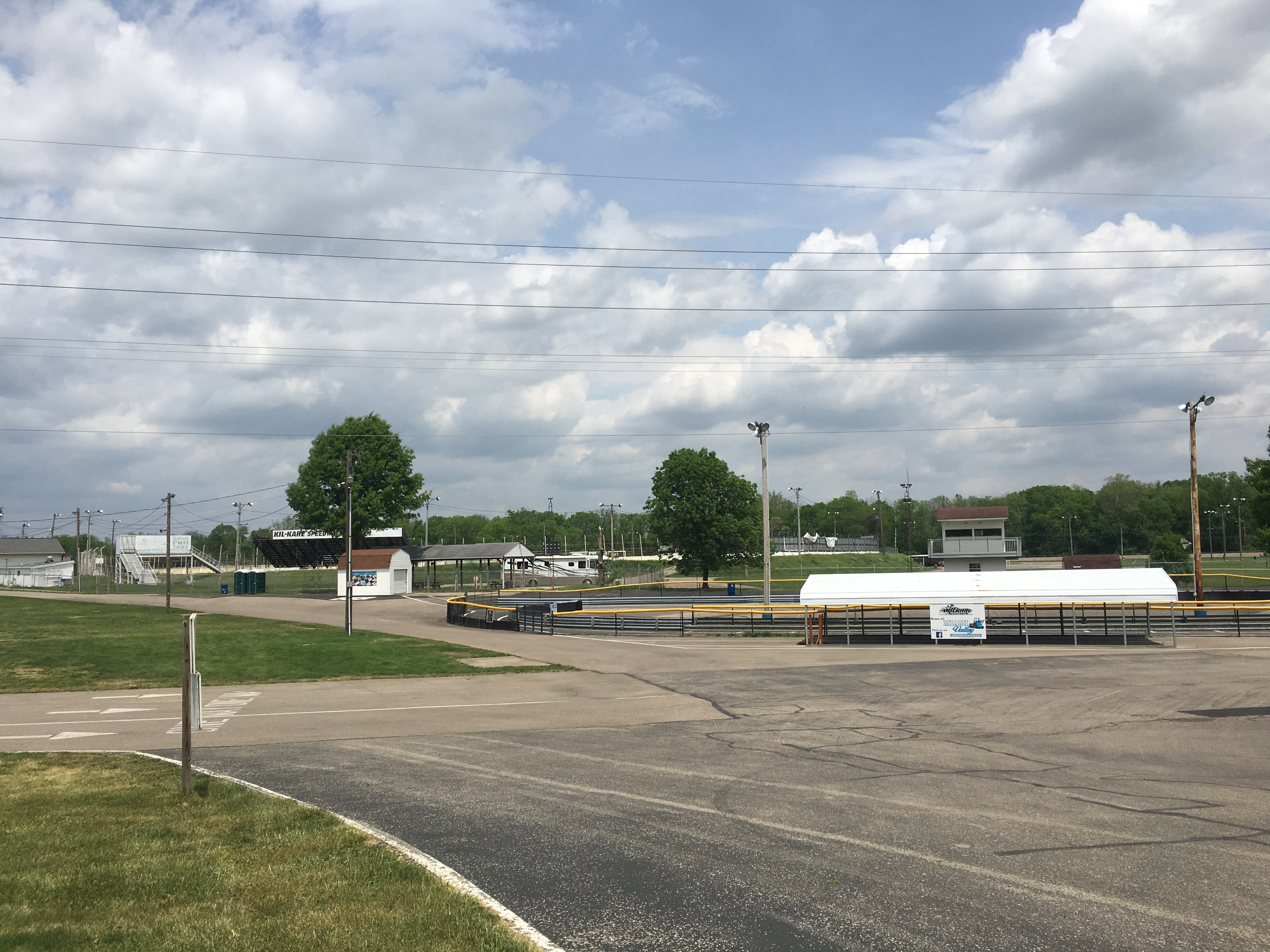
Entrance to Kil-Kare Raceway, May 2018

Darana Raceway (known until September 2025 as "Kil-Kare Raceway") is a motorsports complex located in Xenia Township, Greene County, near Xenia and Dayton, Ohio, USA. Kil-Kare was first built by the Marshall Brothers, and first opened up as a 1/5-mile dirt track in 1951. After one race kicked up a dust storm, the track was paved with a full season of racing in 1952 and reconfigured to a 3/8-mile oval in 1955. The 1/4 mile dragway was opened in 1959, making Kil-Kare a premier facility for both stock car and drag racing.

Kil-Kare at this point in time features two separate tracks: Kil-Kare Speedway, a 3/8 mile (0.6 km) asphalt oval for stock car racing and Kil-Kare Dragway, a 1/4 mile dragstrip. The oval is unconventional in shape, with the cars almost in a continuous slide between turns one and four.

The facility is affiliated with the NHRA, IHRA, and NASCAR and holds events in the Whelen All-American Series as well as local events including figure 8 races and drift events. It formerly hosted races in ARCA and USAR Pro Cup Series competition.

The name Kil-Kare is believed to be derived from an old resort that once stood on the property currently occupied by the raceway. The Creekside Trail bicycle path, which borders the raceway to the south, was once the Columbus and Xenia Railroad. The railroad carried passenger trains near the turn of the 20th century. The passenger trains stopped at the resort that was named "Kill all your cares". As time progressed, the resort closed, the railroad was dismantled, and the name Kil-Kare, which was formed from the name of the resort, stuck.

The 1/4 mile drag strip at Kil-Kare underwent a major renovation in 2013 which included tearing up the old asphalt surface and replacing it with concrete for the entire length of the strip. Kil-Kare is one of few in the country that features a concrete racing surface for the entire 1/4 mile length.

It was announced that Kil-Kare would be switching sanctioning bodies from the NHRA to the IHRA on November 8, 2023. The IHRA purchased the facilities in May 2025 and renamed it to Darana Raceway in September 2025.
