= Chuck Weber (racing driver) =

American racing driver (born 1958)

- Born: April 25, 1958 (age 68); Mesquite, Texas, U.S.

ARCA Menards Series career
- 142 races run over 9 years
- Best finish: 7th (2001)
- First race: 1997 Gateway ARCA 125 (Gateway)
- Last race: 2006 Shop n' Save 150 (Gateway)
Wins	Top tens	Poles
0	4	1
- Statistics up to date as of November 4, 2022.

Chuck Weber (born April 25, 1958) is an American former professional stock car racing driver. He has previously competed in the ARCA Re/Max Series for nine years and earned four top-ten finishes, including a pole at Michigan Speedway in his final season in 2006.

== Racing career ==
Weber made his ARCA Bondo/Mar-Hyde Series debut in 1997, driving his self owned No. 24 Chevrolet at Gateway International Raceway, finishing 21st. He would make two more starts that year with a best finish of 17th at Atlanta Motor Speedway.

In 1998, Weber would run 19 of the 22 races on the schedule, and achieved a best result of 11th at Winchester Speedway, and finished 12th overall in the series standings. In 1999, he would enter in all but one race that year, failing to qualify in four events, and had a best result of 12th at Flat Rock Speedway on his way to 14th in the standings.

Weber would run the full schedule in 2000, failing to qualify at both Lowe's Motor Speedway events, but matched his best standings result of 12th. In 2001, he would run the full schedule, this time running in all events that year with a best result of 12th at Charlotte and the DuQuoin State Fairgrounds Racetrack, on his way to seventh in the standings, his best points result. He would drop to 14th in the standing the following year in 2002, and would drop further to 15th in 2003, which turned out to be his final full time season in ARCA competition.

In 2004, Weber ran only four races and earned a season best result of 12th at Talladega Superspeedway in a collaboration with Andy Belmont Racing.

After not running in the series in 2005, Weber returned in 2006, in what would be his best year in terms of results. After finishing outside the top-20 in three of the first four races before achieving his first top-ten at Kentucky Speedway with a sixth-place finish. He would achieve another top-ten finish of ninth at Pocono Raceway. At the next race at Michigan International Speedway a week later, Weber would start the weekend placing fifth in the practice session on Thursday. He would go on the qualify his No. 24 Ford on pole position with a time of 39.185 seconds and a speed of 183.744 mph. This would be his only pole in ARCA competition. During the race, he would go on to finish 24th, four laps down to race winner David Stremme. In the next two races, he would score two straight top-tens, including a fourth place at Kentucky Speedway. In his last race of the year, coincidentally at the track where he made his debut on, at Gateway, he would finish 35th due to an engine failure. This would be his last start in ARCA competition.

== Personal life ==
Weber is the current owner of Cardinal Tool Company, a custom manufacturing company based in Forney, Texas that served as his sponsor during his racing career.

== Motorsports results ==
=== ARCA Re/Max Series ===
(key) (Bold – Pole position awarded by qualifying time. Italics – Pole position earned by points standings or practice time. * – Most laps led. ** – All laps led.)

ARCA Re/Max Series results
Year	Team	No.	Make	1	2	3	4	5	6	7	8	9	10	11	12	13	14	15	16	17	18	19	20	21	22	23	24	25	ARSC	Pts	Ref
1997	Chuck Weber Racing	24	Chevy	DAY	ATL	SLM	CLT	CLT	POC	MCH	SBS	TOL	KIL	FRS	MIN	POC	MCH	DSF	GTW; 21	SLM	WIN	CLT; 28	TAL	ISF	ATL; 17				N/A	-	
1998	Chuck Weber Racing	24	Chevy	DAY	ATL; 24	SLM; 18	CLT; 27	MEM; 29	MCH	POC; 19	SBS; 16	TOL; 22	PPR; 19	POC; 14	KIL; 15	FRS	ISF; 13	ATL; 37	DSF; 16	SLM; 23	TEX; 20	WIN; 11	CLT; 24	TAL; 22	ATL; 25				12th	3510	
1999	Chuck Weber Racing	24	Chevy	DAY; DNQ	ATL; 28	SLM; 18	AND; DNQ	CLT	MCH; 25	POC; 20	TOL; 19	SBS; 21	BLN; 18	POC; 25	KIL; 21	FRS; 12	FLM; 20	ISF; 18	WIN; 24	DSF; 18	SLM; 17	CLT; DNQ	TAL; DNQ	ATL; 32					14th	2850	
2000	Chuck Weber Racing	24	Chevy	DAY; 32	SLM; 24	AND; 26	CLT; DNQ	KIL; 21	FRS; 21	MCH; 22	POC; 23	TOL; 20	KEN; 32	BLN; 19	POC; 24	WIN; 23	ISF; 24	KEN; 27	DSF; 32	SLM; 20	CLT; DNQ	TAL; 23	ATL; 25						12th	3005	
2001	Chuck Weber Racing	24	Chevy	DAY; 20	NSH; 16	WIN; 22	SLM; 16	GTY; 20	KEN; 17	CLT; 12	KAN; 19	MCH; 35	POC; 15	MEM; 15	GLN; 21	KEN; 14	MCH; 17	POC; 17		ISF; 15	CHI; 31	DSF; 12	SLM; 19	TOL; 19	BLN; 15	CLT; 18	TAL; 29	ATL; 39	7th	4560	
2001	Chuck Weber Racing	24	Pontiac																NSH; 20										7th	4560	
2002	Chuck Weber Racing	24	Chevy	DAY; 37	ATL; 16	NSH; 13	SLM; 26	KEN; 22	CLT; 24	KAN; 33	POC; 12	MCH; 22	TOL; 19	SBO; 16	KEN; 34	BLN; 20	POC; 32	NSH; 25		WIN; 13	DSF; 17	CHI; 20	SLM; 33		CLT; 34				14th	3640	
2002	Kerry Scherer	4	Chevy															NSH; QL^{†}											14th	3640	
2002	Chuck Weber Racing	14	Chevy																ISF; 27										14th	3640	
2002	Chuck Weber Racing	50	Chevy																					TAL; 41					14th	3640	
2003	Chuck Weber Racing	24	Chevy	DAY; 25	ATL; 16	NSH; 24	SLM; 16	TOL; 21	KEN; 35	CLT; 36	BLN; 23	KAN; 12	MCH; 35	LER; 18	POC; 25	POC; 16	NSH; 24	ISF; 24	WIN; 25	DSF; 34	CHI; 18	SLM; 28	TAL; 19	CLT; 30	SBO; 35				15th	3640	
2004	Chuck Weber Racing	24	Chevy	DAY	NSH	SLM	KEN	TOL	CLT	KAN	POC	MCH	SBO	BLN	KEN	GTW	POC; 24	LER											48th	605	
2004	Chuck Weber Racing	24	Pontiac																NSH; 15	ISF	TOL	DSF							48th	605	
2004	Chuck Weber Racing	24	Ford																				CHI; 13	SLM					48th	605	
2004	Andy Belmont Racing	24	Chevy																						TAL; 12				48th	605	
2006	Chuck Weber Racing	24	Chevy	DAY; 17										BLN; 25															22nd	2280	
2006	Chuck Weber Racing	24	Ford		NSH; 21	SLM; 34	WIN; 24	KEN; 6	TOL; 22	POC; 9	**MCH**; 24	KAN; 10	KEN; 4		POC; 15	GTW; 35	NSH	MCH	ISF	MIL	TOL	DSF	CHI	SLM	TAL	IOW			22nd	2280	
^{†} - Qualified but replaced by Dick Tracey
