= Carl McCormick =

American racing driver

- Born: February 4, 1968 (age 58); Jacksonville, Florida, U.S.

ARCA Menards Series career
- 16 races run over 5 years
- Best finish: 24th (2003)
- First race: 2001 Waste Management 200 (Nashville)
- Last race: 2006 Pocono 200 (Pocono)
Wins	Top tens	Poles
0	0	0
- Statistics up to date as of November 30, 2024.

Carl McCormick (born February 4, 1968) is an American former professional stock car racing driver who has competed in the ARCA Re/Max Series from 2001 to 2006.

== Motorsports results ==
=== ARCA Re/Max Series ===
(key) (Bold – Pole position awarded by qualifying time. Italics – Pole position earned by points standings or practice time. * – Most laps led. ** – All laps led.)

ARCA Re/Max Series results
Year	Team	No.	Make	1	2	3	4	5	6	7	8	9	10	11	12	13	14	15	16	17	18	19	20	21	22	23	24	25	ARMSC	Pts	Ref
2001	N/A	10	Ford	DAY	NSH	WIN	SLM	GTY	KEN	CLT	KAN	MCH	POC	MEM	GLN	KEN	MCH	POC	NSH; 18	ISF	CHI	DSF	SLM	TOL	BLN				97th	285	
2001	James Hylton Motorsports	60	Ford																							CLT; 30	TAL	ATL; 33	97th	285	
2002	Randy Fenley	15	Ford	DAY; 15	ATL	NSH	SLM	KEN	CLT	KAN	POC	MCH	TOL	SBO	KEN	BLN	POC	NSH	ISF	WIN	DSF	CHI	SLM	TAL					90th	315	
2002	Capital City Motorsports	83	Ford																						CLT; 14				90th	315	
2003	James Hylton Motorsports	48	Chevy	DAY	ATL	NSH	SLM	TOL; 22																					24th	1085	
2003	James Hylton Motorsports	48	Ford						KEN; 20	CLT; 31	BLN	KAN	MCH; 18	LER	POC; 12	POC; 17	NSH; 17	ISF	WIN	DSF	CHI; 14	SLM	TAL	CLT	SBO				24th	1085	
2004	James Hylton Motorsports	48	Ford	DAY}	NSH	SLM	KEN; 18	TOL	CLT; DNQ	KAN	POC	MCH	SBO	BLN	KEN	GTW	POC	LER	NSH	ISF	TOL	DSF	CHI	SLM; 17	TAL				82nd	310	
2006	Andy Belmont Racing	1	Ford	DAY	NSH	SLM	WIN	KEN	TOL	POC; 13	MCH	KAN	KEN	BLN	POC	GTW	NSH	MCH	ISF	MIL	TOL	DSF	CHI	SLM	TAL	IOW			114th	165	
