= Randy Van Zant =

American racing driver (born 1957)

- Born: August 11, 1957 (age 69); Brookville, Ohio, U.S.

ARCA Menards Series career
- 63 races run over 9 years
- Best finish: 20th (2003)
- First race: 1998 Kentuckiana Ford Dealers 200 (Salem)
- Last race: 2006 Sara Lee/GFS Marketplace 200 (Berlin)
Wins	Top tens	Poles
0	14	0
- Statistics up to date as of March 27, 2024.

Randy Van Zant (born August 11, 1957) is an American former professional stock car racing driver who has previously competed in the ARCA Re/Max Series.

== Racing career ==
Van Zant's interest in racing began when he was frequently around a family friend's USAC sprint car racing team as a child. His career would not being however until 1986, where he formed a street stock team, and won track championships between 1987 and 1988. Other members of the crew also drove in street stock competition in car that were built by Van Zant, and the team accomplished five track championships. Van Zant moved to late models in 1989, and he ran on and off races for Haupt up until 1997.

In 1998, Van Zant made his ARCA Bondo/Mar-Hyde Series debut at Salem Speedway, driving the No. 32 Pontiac for Jerry Haupt, where he started in 22nd and finished in ninth place, albeit five laps down behind race winner Frank Kimmel. He then made four more starts across the year, finishing in the top-twenty in all races. In 1999, he ran eleven races, finishing in the top-ten twice with a best finish of ninth at Kil-Kare Speedway, and finished runner-up in the rookie of the year standings behind Ron Cox. From 2000 to 2001, he only finished in the top-ten once in sixteen starts, a sixth place at Memphis Motorsports Park in 2001.

In 2002, Van Zant and Haupt planned on running all short-track events, and potentially up to four superspeedway races, although they only ran the short-track events, getting a best finish of fourth in his first start of the year at Salem. He then earned two top-five finishes the following year in 2003, a fourth place at Winchester Speedway and a fifth at Salem, and finished twentieth in points despite running only nine races that year.

In 2004, Van Zant attempted to make his NASCAR Craftsman Truck Series debut at Mansfield Motorsports Park, driving the No. 83 Ford for fellow ARCA competitor Greg Sarff, but ultimately failed to qualify due to qualifying being cancelled. He also made only six ARCA races that year, getting a best finish of sixth at the DuQuoin State Fairgrounds dirt track. In 2005, Van Zant left Haupt to run five races between entries fielded by Bobby Gerhart Racing, James Hylton Motorsports, and Darrell Basham Racing, and got a best finish of tenth in his final race of the year at Salem. It was also during this year that he attempted to make two races in the Hooters Pro Cup Series, failing to qualify for both events at Indianapolis Raceway Park and Kil-Kare. Van Zant then attempted only three ARCA races in 2006, finishing tenth at Winchester, failing to qualify at Toledo Speedway, and finishing thirteenth at Berlin Raceway. The Berlin event is his most recent event as a driver, as he has not competed in the series since then.

== Personal life ==
Van Zant graduated from Trotwood-Madison High School in 1975, and is the father of three children.

== Motorsports results ==
=== NASCAR ===
(key) (Bold – Pole position awarded by qualifying time. Italics – Pole position earned by points standings or practice time. * – Most laps led.)

==== Craftsman Truck Series ====
NASCAR Craftsman Truck Series results
Year	Team	No.	Make	1	2	3	4	5	6	7	8	9	10	11	12	13	14	15	16	17	18	19	20	21	22	23	24	25	NCTC	Pts	Ref
2004	Capital City Motorsports	83	Ford	DAY	ATL	MAR	MFD; DNQ	CLT	DOV	TEX	MEM	MLW	KAN	KEN	GTW	MCH	IRP	NSH	BRI	RCH	NHA	LVS	CAL	TEX	MAR	PHO	DAR	HOM	N/A	0	

=== ARCA Re/Max Series ===
(key) (Bold – Pole position awarded by qualifying time. Italics – Pole position earned by points standings or practice time. * – Most laps led.)

ARCA Re/Max Series results
Year	Team	No.	Make	1	2	3	4	5	6	7	8	9	10	11	12	13	14	15	16	17	18	19	20	21	22	23	24	25	ARMC	Pts	Ref
1998	Jerry Haupt	32	Pontiac	DAY	ATL	SLM; 9	CLT	MEM; 13	MCH	POC		TOL; 15	PPR	POC	KIL; 12	FRS	ISF	ATL	DSF	SLM	TEX	WIN	CLT	TAL	ATL				N/A	0	
1998	Jim Leonard	32	Olds								SBS; 17																		N/A	0	
1999	Jerry Haupt	32	Pontiac	DAY	ATL	SLM; 17	AND; 23	CLT	MCH	POC	TOL; 25	SBS; 20	BLN; 14	POC	KIL; 9	FRS; 10	FLM	ISF; 34	WIN; 31	DSF; 29	SLM; 16	CLT	TAL	ATL					24th	1390	
2000	Jerry Haupt	7	Pontiac	DAY	SLM; 20	AND; 28	CLT	KIL; 16	FRS; 14	MCH	POC	TOL; 25	KEN			WIN; 21	ISF; 14	KEN	DSF; 13	SLM; 21	CLT	TAL	ATL						25th	1380	
2000	Jerry Haupt	7	Chevy											BLN; 12	POC														25th	1380	
2001	Jerry Haupt	5	Pontiac	DAY	NSH	WIN; 24	SLM; 15	GTY	KEN	CLT	KAN	MCH	POC	MEM; 6	GLN					ISF; 14	CHI	DSF; 20	SLM	TOL					43rd	855	
2001	Jerry Haupt	16	Chevy													KEN; 26	MCH	POC	NSH										43rd	855	
2001	Bobby Gerhart Racing	5	Pontiac																						BLN; DNQ	CLT	TAL	ATL	43rd	855	
2002	Jerry Haupt	5	Pontiac	DAY	ATL	NSH	SLM; 4						TOL; 31		KEN; 21	BLN; 9	POC	NSH	ISF; 15	WIN; 5	DSF	CHI	SLM; 34	TAL	CLT				26th	1250	
2002	Jerry Haupt	7	Pontiac					KEN; 36	CLT	KAN	POC	MCH		SBO; 9															26th	1250	
2003	Jerry Haupt	5	Pontiac	DAY	ATL	NSH	SLM; 14	TOL; 11			BLN; 15	KAN	MCH								CHI; 27								20th	1405	
2003	Jerry Haupt	7	Pontiac						KEN; 36	CLT				LER; 11	POC	POC	NSH	ISF; 12	WIN; 4	DSF		SLM; 5	TAL	CLT	SBO				20th	1405	
2004	Jerry Haupt	5	Pontiac	DAY	NSH	SLM; 29	KEN	TOL	CLT	KAN	POC	MCH	SBO	BLN; 16	KEN	GTW	POC			ISF; 22	TOL	DSF; 6	CHI	SLM; 22	TAL				33rd	855	
2004	Jerry Haupt	7	Pontiac															LER; 10	NSH										33rd	855	
2005	Bobby Gerhart Racing	5	Pontiac	DAY	NSH	SLM; 23	KEN	TOL	LAN	MIL	POC	MCH	KAN	KEN	BLN; 24	POC	GTW								SLM; 10	TAL			51st	715	
2005	James Hylton Motorsports	48	Pontiac															LER; 12	NSH	MCH	ISF								51st	715	
2005	Darrell Basham Racing	94	Pontiac																			TOL; 18	DSF	CHI					51st	715	
2006	Bobby Gerhart Racing	7	Chevy	DAY	NSH	SLM	WIN; 10	KEN	TOL; DNQ	POC	MCH	KAN	KEN	BLN; 13	POC	GTW	NSH	MCH	ISF	MIL	TOL	DSF	CHI	SLM	TAL	IOW			82nd	370	
