= Bill Eversole =

American racing driver (born 1963)

- Born: March 3, 1963 (age 63); Chelsea, Michigan, U.S.
- Awards: 2003 ARCA Re/Max Series Rookie of the Year

NASCAR O'Reilly Auto Parts Series career
- 1 race run over 1 year
- Best finish: 139th (2004)
- First race: 2004 Cabela's 250 (Michigan)
Wins	Top tens	Poles
0	0	0

ARCA Menards Series career
- 50 races run over 6 years
- Best finish: 7th (2003)
- First race: 2001 Kentucky ARCA 150 (Kentucky)
- Last race: 2006 Hantz Group 200 (Michigan)
Wins	Top tens	Poles
0	13	0
- Statistics up to date as of March 21, 2024.

Bill Eversole (born March 3, 1963) is an American former professional stock car racing driver who competed in the NASCAR Busch Series and the ARCA Re/Max Series.

== Racing career ==
In 2001, Eversole made his ARCA Re/Max Series debut at Kentucky Speedway, driving the No. 10 Ford, where he started 31st and finished eleven laps down in 25th place. He then made two more starts teamed with car owner Steve Murillo and Venturini Motorsports, finishing 31st at the first Michigan International Speedway event due to engine issues, and finishing four laps down in sixteenth at the second Michigan race. He then made only one start the following year in 2002, driving the No. 08 Ford for team owner Steve Murillo at Michigan, where he finished 39th after running only eight laps due to rear end issues.

In 2003, Eversole joined Brad Kemp Motorsports and drove the No. 08 Chevrolet for the full schedule. He finished seventh in the final points standings with nine top-tens and went on to win rookie of the year honors at the end of the year. Afterwards, he made only three starts in 2004, getting a best finish of sixth at the first Michigan race. It was also during this year that he attempted to make his NASCAR Busch Series debut at Michigan, driving the No. 72 Chevrolet for MacDonald Motorsports, where he qualified in 26th but finished in 37th in the race. He also attempted to make his second Busch start at Kansas Speedway later in the year, this time driving the No. 56 Chevrolet for MacHill Motorsports, but ultimately failed to qualify.

In 2005, Eversole drove for Norm Benning Racing at the season opening race for ARCA at Daytona International Speedway, where he started thirteenth but finished in 35th due to being involved in a multi car crash midway through the race. Afterwards, he drove the No. 08 for Hardcore Motorsports for all but the final three races on the schedule, getting three top-tens with a best finish of fifth at the Illinois State Fairgrounds dirt track to finished fifteenth in the final points standings. For the following year, Eversole only attempted the two Michigan ARCA races, driving the No. 7 Dodge for Bobby Gerhart Racing, failing to qualify for the first event and finishing nineteenth in the second event. The second Michigan race is his most recent start as a driver, as he has not competed in the series since then.

== Motorsports results ==
=== NASCAR ===
(key) (Bold – Pole position awarded by qualifying time. Italics – Pole position earned by points standings or practice time. * – Most laps led.)

==== Busch Series ====
NASCAR Busch Series results
Year	Team	No.	Make	1	2	3	4	5	6	7	8	9	10	11	12	13	14	15	16	17	18	19	20	21	22	23	24	25	26	27	28	29	30	31	32	33	34	NBSC	Pts	Ref
2004	MacDonald Motorsports	72	Chevy	DAY	CAR	LVS	DAR	BRI	TEX	NSH	TAL	CAL	GTY	RCH	NZH	CLT	DOV	NSH	KEN	MLW	DAY	CHI	NHA	PPR	IRP	MCH; 37	BRI	CAL	RCH	DOV								139th	52	
2004	MacHill Motorsports	56	Chevy																												KAN; DNQ	CLT	MEM	ATL	PHO	DAR	HOM	139th	52	

=== ARCA Re/Max Series ===
(key) (Bold – Pole position awarded by qualifying time. Italics – Pole position earned by points standings or practice time. * – Most laps led.)

ARCA Re/Max Series results
Year	Team	No.	Make	1	2	3	4	5	6	7	8	9	10	11	12	13	14	15	16	17	18	19	20	21	22	23	24	25	ARSC	Pts	Ref
2001	Venturini Motorsports	10	Ford	DAY	NSH	WIN	SLM	GTY	KEN; 25	CLT	KAN																		84th	380	
2001	Venturini Motorsports	25	Ford									MCH; 31	POC	MEM	GLN	KEN	MCH; 16	POC	NSH	ISF	CHI	DSF	SLM	TOL; Wth	BLN; DNQ	CLT	TAL	ATL	84th	380	
2002	Steve Muerllo	08	Ford	DAY	ATL	NSH; DNQ	SLM	KEN	CLT	KAN	POC	MCH; 39	TOL	SBO	KEN	BLN	POC	NSH	ISF	WIN	DSF	CHI	SLM	TAL	CLT				167th	35	
2003	Brad Kemp Motorsports	08	Chevy	DAY; 15	ATL; 10	NSH; 20	SLM; 27	TOL; 9	KEN; 29	CLT; 30	BLN; 9	KAN; 27	MCH; 11	LER; 8	POC; 11	POC; 33	NSH; 10	ISF; 9	WIN; 12	DSF; 7	CHI; 7	SLM; 11	TAL; 7	CLT; 23	SBO; 27				7th	4575	
2004	Mark Gibson Racing	56	Chevy	DAY	NSH	SLM	KEN	TOL; 21	CLT	KAN	POC																		67th	410	
2004	Bob Aiello	62	Chevy									MCH; 6	SBO																67th	410	
2004	Bobby Gerhart Racing	7	Pontiac											BLN; 29	KEN	GTW	POC	LER	NSH	ISF	TOL	DSF	CHI	SLM	TAL				67th	410	
2005	Norm Benning Racing	8	Dodge	DAY; 35																									15th	3455	
2005	Hardcore Motorsports	08	Chevy		NSH; 38	SLM; 17	KEN; 27	TOL; 24	LAN; 14	MIL; 21	POC; 16	MCH; 13	KAN; 8	KEN; 31	BLN; 35				NSH; 26	MCH; 31	ISF; 5		DSF; 22	CHI	SLM	TAL			15th	3455	
2005	Hardcore Motorsports	08	Dodge													POC; 11	GTW; 17	LER; 9											15th	3455	
2005	Hardcore Motorsports	08	Pontiac																			TOL; 31							15th	3455	
2006	Bobby Gerhart Racing	7	Dodge	DAY	NSH	SLM	WIN	KEN	TOL	POC	MCH; DNQ	KAN	KEN	BLN	POC	GTW	NSH	MCH; 19	ISF	MIL	TOL	DSF	CHI	SLM	TAL	IOW			116th	160	
