= Marty Butkovich =

American racing driver

- Born: February 17, 1974 (age 52); Romeo, Michigan, U.S.

ARCA Menards Series career
- 24 races run over 5 years
- Best finish: 26th (2004)
- First race: 2001 ARCA Re/Max 250 (Winchester)
- Last race: 2005 ARCA 200 Presented by Hamot & Biomet (Lake Erie)
Wins	Top tens	Poles
0	0	0
- Statistics up to date as of December 1, 2024.

Marty Butkovich (born February 17, 1974) is an American former professional stock car racing driver who has competed in the ARCA Re/Max Series from 2001 to 2006.

== Motorsports results ==
=== ARCA Re/Max Series ===
(key) (Bold – Pole position awarded by qualifying time. Italics – Pole position earned by points standings or practice time. * – Most laps led. ** – All laps led.)

ARCA Re/Max Series results
Year	Team	No.	Make	1	2	3	4	5	6	7	8	9	10	11	12	13	14	15	16	17	18	19	20	21	22	23	24	25	ARMSC	Pts	Ref
2001	Tom Butkovich	36	Chevy	DAY	NSH	WIN; 17	SLM; 19	GTY	KEN	CLT	KAN	MCH	POC																44th	820	
2001	Tom Butkovich	7	Chevy											MEM; 23	GLN	KEN	MCH	POC	NSH	ISF	CHI	DSF							44th	820	
2001	Tom Butkovich	5	Chevy																				SLM; 25	TOL; 12	BLN; 16	CLT	TAL	ATL	44th	820	
2002	Tom Butkovich	7	Chevy	DAY	ATL	NSH	SLM; 25	KEN	CLT	KAN	POC					BLN; 16	POC	NSH	ISF										39th	690	
2002	Tom Butkovich	39	Chevy									MCH; 38	TOL	SBO	KEN														39th	690	
2002	Roulo Brothers Racing	39	Chevy																	WIN; 15	DSF	CHI	SLM; 32	TAL	CLT; 28				39th	690	
2003	Roulo Brothers Racing	39	Chevy	DAY	ATL	NSH	SLM	TOL; 32	KEN	CLT																			69th	390	
2003	James Hylton Motorsports	48	Ford								BLN; 16	KAN		LER; 17	POC	POC	NSH	ISF	WIN	DSF									69th	390	
2003	Bobby Gerhart Racing	7	Chevy										MCH; DNQ																69th	390	
2003	Capital City Motorsports	83	Chevy																		CHI; DNQ	SLM	TAL	CLT	SBO				69th	390	
2004	James Hylton Motorsports	48	Chevy	DAY	NSH	SLM; 13	KEN	TOL; 17	CLT	KAN	POC	MCH; 19	SBO																26th	990	
2004	Capital City Motorsports	38	Chevy											BLN; 20	KEN	GTW	POC	LER; 25	NSH	ISF	TOL; 16	DSF	CHI	SLM; 14	TAL				26th	990	
2005	Hixson Motorsports	22	Chevy	DAY	NSH	SLM	KEN	TOL; DNQ	LAN	MIL	POC	MCH	KAN	KEN															100th	250	
2005	Hixson Motorsports	2	Chevy												BLN; 26	POC	GTW	LER; 31	NSH	MCH; DNQ	ISF								100th	250	
2005	Hixson Motorsports	22	Pontiac																			TOL; DNQ	DSF	CHI	SLM	TAL			100th	250	
