= Roger Blackstock =

American racing driver

- Born: December 4, 1962 (age 63); Richmond, Michigan, U.S.

ARCA Menards Series career
- 170 races run over 18 years
- Best finish: 9th (1994), (1996)
- First race: 1984 Capital City 100 (Spartan)
- Last race: 2001 Pork The Other White Meat 200 (Berlin)
Wins	Top tens	Poles
0	31	0
- Statistics up to date as of December 4, 2024.

Roger Blackstock (born December 4, 1962) is an American former professional stock car racing driver who has previously competed in the ARCA Re/Max Series from 1984 to 2001.

Blackstock has also competed in the X-1R Pro Cup Series, the Super Cup Stock Car Series, and the ARCA Late Model Gold Cup Series.

== Motorsports career results ==
=== NASCAR ===
(key) (Bold - Pole position awarded by qualifying time. Italics - Pole position earned by points standings or practice time. * – Most laps led.)

==== Busch Series ====
NASCAR Busch Series results
Year	Team	No.	Make	1	2	3	4	5	6	7	8	9	10	11	12	13	14	15	16	17	18	19	20	21	22	23	24	25	26	27	NBSC	Pts	Ref
1985	N/A	42	Buick	DAY	CAR	HCY	BRI	MAR	DAR	SBO	LGY	DOV	CLT	SBO	HCY	ROU	IRP; DNQ	SBO	LGY	HCY	MLW	BRI	DAR	RCH	NWS	ROU	CLT	HCY	CAR	MAR	N/A	0	

=== ARCA Re/Max Series ===
(key) (Bold – Pole position awarded by qualifying time. Italics – Pole position earned by points standings or practice time. * – Most laps led. ** – All laps led.)

ARCA Re/Max Series results
Year	Team	No.	Make	1	2	3	4	5	6	7	8	9	10	11	12	13	14	15	16	17	18	19	20	21	22	23	24	25	ARMSC	Pts	Ref
1984	Roger Blackstock	112	Chevy	DAY	ATL	TAL	CSP	SMS; 18	FRS; 24	MCS; 12	LCS	IRP	TAL	FRS; 12	ISF	DSF	TOL; 15	MGR											24th	385	
1985	Roger Blackstock	42	Buick	ATL; 34	DAY; 31	ATL	TAL	ATL; 26						OEF; 19			TOL; 24												18th	680	
1985	Roger Blackstock	42	Chevy						SSP; 16	IRP	CSP; 11	FRS; 19			ISF; 26	DSF; 37													18th	680	
1985	Roger Blackstock	42	Dodge										IRP; 16																18th	680	
1986	Roger Blackstock	42	Buick	ATL; 38				SIR; 8	SSP; 14	FRS; 20	KIL; 8	CSP; 15	TAL	BLN; 11	ISF; 14	DSF; 20	TOL; 11	MCS; 12											15th	1225	
1986	Roger Blackstock	42	Pontiac		DAY; 30	ATL; 29	TAL												ATL; 32										15th	1225	
1987	Roger Blackstock	42	Pontiac	DAY; 23	ATL; 18	TAL	DEL; 16	ACS; 24	TOL	ROC	POC; 23	FRS; 17	KIL; 18	TAL	FRS; 25	ISF	INF; 38	DSF	SLM; 21	ATL									N/A	0	
1988	Roger Blackstock	42	Pontiac	DAY	ATL; 33	TAL	FRS	PCS	ROC	POC	WIN; 14	KIL; 20	ACS; 20	SLM	POC	TAL	DEL; 19	FRS; 20	ISF; DNQ	DSF	SLM	ATL							N/A	0	
1989	Roger Blackstock	42	Pontiac	DAY	ATL	KIL; 24	TAL	FRS; 5	POC	KIL; 14	HAG	POC	TAL	DEL; 22	FRS; 27	ISF	TOL; 13	DSF	SLM; 11	ATL									N/A	0	
1990	Roger Blackstock	12	Pontiac	DAY	ATL	KIL; 24	TAL	FRS; 11	POC	KIL; 11	TOL; 12	HAG	POC	TAL	MCH	ISF; 10	TOL; 18	DSF; 7	WIN; 11	DEL; 17	ATL								19th	1465	
1991	Roger Blackstock	12	Pontiac	DAY	ATL	KIL; 20	TAL	TOL; 29	FRS; 18	POC				DEL; 17	POC	TAL	HPT; 11	MCH; 30	ISF	TOL; 21	DSF	TWS	ATL						23rd	1005	
1991	Roger Blackstock	12	Buick								MCH; 21	KIL	FRS																23rd	1005	
1992	Roger Blackstock	12	Pontiac	DAY	FIF	TWS	TAL	TOL	KIL	POC	MCH	FRS	KIL; 13	NSH	DEL; 19	POC		FRS; 18	ISF; 17	TOL; 16	DSF; 14	TWS	SLM; 26	ATL					N/A	0	
1992	Roger Blackstock	72	Pontiac														HPT; 22												N/A	0	
1993	Roger Blackstock	12	Pontiac	DAY	FIF	TWS	TAL	KIL	CMS	FRS; 16	TOL; 17	POC	MCH	FRS; 22		KIL; 20	ISF; 6	DSF; 11	TOL; 10	SLM; 17	WIN; 30	ATL							17th	1830	
1993	Charlie Newby	77	Chrysler												POC; 23														17th	1830	
1994	Roger Blackstock	12	Olds	DAY; DNQ							MCH; 34		POC; 21	POC; 32										ATL; DNQ					9th	3740	
1994	Charlie Newby	77	Olds		TAL; 32																								9th	3740	
1994	Roger Blackstock	12	Pontiac			FIF; 6	LVL; 20	KIL; 6	TOL; 27	FRS; 8		DMS; 17			KIL; 26	FRS; 23	INF; 10	I70; 20	ISF; 28	DSF; 15	TOL; 15	SLM; 21	WIN; 16						9th	3740	
1995	Roger Blackstock	12	Pontiac	DAY	ATL	TAL	FIF; 21	KIL; 13	FRS; 15	MCH	I80; 29	MCS; 9	FRS; 15	POC	POC	KIL; 4	FRS; 3			ISF; 21	DSF; 10	SLM; 6							15th	2420	
1995	Roger Blackstock	52	Pontiac															SBS; 17	LVL										15th	2420	
1995	Ken Schrader Racing	52	Pontiac																				WIN; 18	ATL					15th	2420	
1996	Roger Blackstock	12	Dodge	DAY	ATL	SLM	TAL	FIF; 17	LVL; 18	CLT	CLT	KIL; 8	FRS; 9	POC	MCH	FRS; 21	TOL; 6	POC	MCH	INF; 31	SBS; 2	ISF; 5	DSF; 12	KIL; 4	SLM; 32	WIN; 20			9th	2425	
1996	Fast Track Racing Enterprises	48	Chevy																								CLT; 39		9th	2425	
1996	Fast Track Racing Enterprises	48	Olds																									ATL; 34	9th	2425	
1997	Roger Blackstock	12	Dodge	DAY	ATL	SLM; 24	CLT	CLT	POC	MCH	SBS; 24	TOL; 23	KIL; 3	FRS; 8	MIN; 10	POC	MCH	DSF	GTW	SLM; 23	WIN; 28	CLT	TAL	ISF	ATL				N/A	0	
1998	Roger Blackstock	12	Chrysler	DAY	ATL	SLM	CLT; 34																						N/A	0	
1998	Roger Blackstock	12	Dodge					MEM; 12	MCH	POC	SBS; 7	TOL; 9	PPR	POC	KIL; 28	FRS; 12	ISF; 25	ATL	DSF; 11	SLM; DNQ	TEX	WIN; 15	CLT	TAL	ATL				N/A	0	
1999	Charlie Newby	77	Chevy	DAY	ATL	SLM	AND	CLT	MCH	POC; DNQ																			38th	870	
1999	Roger Blackstock	12	Pontiac							POC; 28																			38th	870	
1999	Roger Blackstock	12	Dodge								TOL; DNQ	SBS	BLN; DNQ	POC	KIL; 3	FRS; 23	FLM; 29	ISF; DNQ	WIN; 12	DSF	SLM; 12	CLT	TAL	ATL					38th	870	
2000	Cunningham Motorsports	4	Dodge	DAY	SLM; 21	AND; 14	CLT	KIL; 25	FRS; 7	MCH	POC	TOL; 15	KEN	BLN; 22	POC	WIN; 8	ISF; 18	KEN	DSF; 20	SLM; 18	CLT	TAL	ATL						24th	1415	
2001	Cunningham Motorsports	4	Dodge	DAY	NSH	WIN; 18	SLM	GTY	KEN	CLT	KAN																		48th	765	
2001	Roger Blackstock	12	Ford									MCH; 37	POC	MEM	GLN	KEN													48th	765	
2001	Bobby Gerhart Racing	7	Ford														MCH; 19	POC	NSH	ISF	CHI								48th	765	
2001	Roger Blackstock	12	Chevy																			DSF; 31	SLM						48th	765	
2001	LJ Racing	91	Ford																					TOL; 7					48th	765	
2001	LJ Racing	91	Dodge																						BLN; 11	CLT	TAL	ATL	48th	765	
