= Brian Conz =

American racing driver (born 1966)

- Born: January 25, 1966 (age 60); Livonia, Michigan, U.S.

ARCA Menards Series career
- 47 races run over 10 years
- Best finish: 10th (1998)
- First race: 1996 Michigan ARCA 200 (Michigan)
- Last race: 2007 Daytona ARCA 200 (Daytona)
| Wins | Top tens | Poles |
|---|---|---|
| 0 | 0 | 0 |
- Statistics up to date as of February 10, 2024.

Brian Conz (born January 25, 1966) is an American former professional stock car racing driver who previously competed in the ARCA Re/Max Series.

== Racing career ==
Conz began his racing career in 1998, driving in street stocks.

After making select starts in the Iceman Super Car Series between 1991 and 1994, Conz made his ARCA Bondo/Mar-Hyde Series debut at Michigan Speedway, driving the No. 18 Oldsmobile that he owned, where he finished fourteenth after starting 29th. He then made another start that year at Lowe's Motor Speedway, where he finished 41st after suffering engine issues before the start of the race. He then made four more starts the following year, where he got a best finish of seventeenth at Talladega Superspeedway, where he drove the No. 06 Pontiac for Wayne Peterson Racing.

In 1998, Conz ran the full ARCA schedule, splitting time between driving for Peterson and James Hylton Motorsports. He finished tenth in the final point standings despite not finishing higher than twelfth, which was achieved at Texas Motor Speedway. Afterwards, Conz made only seven more starts between 1999 and 2002, getting a best result of twelfth at Chicagoland Speedway in 2002. For the following year in 2003, Conz ran the majority of races on the schedule, splitting time between Wayne Peterson Racing and Anthony Desmond. He finished eighteenth in the final standings with a best result of 21st at Pocono Raceway. It was also during this year that he attempted to make his NASCAR Busch Series debut at Nazareth Speedway, driving the No. 70 Chevrolet for Davis Motorsports, but ultimately failed to qualify. In 2004, Conz attempted to make the Busch Series season opener at Daytona International Speedway, this time driving the No. 05 Chevrolet for Day Racing Enterprises, but also failed to qualify. It was also during this year that he was in a legal battle with his brother, Edward "Butch" Conz Jr., after it was alleged that the elder Conz had purposefully took possession of the cars and equipment in order to sell them and keep the profits for his own gain. Also included was the complaint that Conz had run a paint scheme for Daytona that advertised the 2004 presidential campaign of George W. Bush, with the hood of the car having phrases like "Bush", "Cheney", and "04".

After not making any starts for the next two years, Conz returned to the ARCA Re/Max Series at Daytona, driving the No. 8 Dodge for Sadler Brothers Racing, where he qualified in sixteenth but finished 37th after being collected in a multi-car crash halfway through the race. It was also revealed in January of that year that Conz would run the full NASCAR Busch Series schedule for Frank Cicci Racing in the No. 34 Chevrolet, with Scottish Rite serving as the sponsor. However, this ultimately would fall through after the team put Conz and Scottish Rite on notice after failing to pay for its financial obligations, and Conz was ultimately replaced by Jay Sauter after Daytona, where Steve Grissom drove the No. 34.

In 2008, Conz attempted to make the ARCA race at Daytona, driving the No. 86 Dodge for Corrie Stott Racing, but failed to qualify. This would be his most recent attempt as a driver, as he has not competed in any racing series since then.

== Motorsports results ==
=== NASCAR ===
(key) (Bold – Pole position awarded by qualifying time. Italics – Pole position earned by points standings or practice time. * – Most laps led.)

==== Busch Series ====
NASCAR Busch Series results
| Year | Team | No. | Make | 1 | 2 | 3 | 4 | 5 | 6 | 7 | 8 | 9 | 10 | 11 | 12 | 13 | 14 | 15 | 16 | 17 | 18 | 19 | 20 | 21 | 22 | 23 | 24 | 25 | 26 | 27 | 28 | 29 | 30 | 31 | 32 | 33 | 34 | NBSC | Pts | Ref |
|---|---|---|---|---|---|---|---|---|---|---|---|---|---|---|---|---|---|---|---|---|---|---|---|---|---|---|---|---|---|---|---|---|---|---|---|---|---|---|---|---|
| 2003 | Davis Motorsports | 70 | Chevy | DAY | CAR | LVS | DAR | BRI | TEX | TAL | NSH | CAL | RCH | GTY | NZH; DNQ | CLT | DOV | NSH | KEN | MLW | DAY | CHI | NHA | PPR | IRP | MCH | BRI | DAR | RCH | DOV | KAN | CLT | MEM | ATL | PHO | CAR | HOM | N/A | 0 | |
| 2004 | Conz-Diaz Champion Racing | 05 | Chevy | DAY; DNQ | CAR | LVS | DAR | BRI | TEX | NSH | TAL | CAL | GTY | RCH | NZH | CLT | DOV | NSH | KEN | MLW | DAY | CHI | NHA | PPR | IRP | MCH | BRI | CAL | RCH | DOV | KAN | CLT | MEM | ATL | PHO | DAR | HOM | N/A | 0 | |

=== ARCA Re/Max Series ===
(key) (Bold – Pole position awarded by qualifying time. Italics – Pole position earned by points standings or practice time. * – Most laps led.)

ARCA Re/Max Series results
| Year | Team | No. | Make | 1 | 2 | 3 | 4 | 5 | 6 | 7 | 8 | 9 | 10 | 11 | 12 | 13 | 14 | 15 | 16 | 17 | 18 | 19 | 20 | 21 | 22 | 23 | 24 | 25 | ARSC | Pts | Ref |
|---|---|---|---|---|---|---|---|---|---|---|---|---|---|---|---|---|---|---|---|---|---|---|---|---|---|---|---|---|---|---|---|
| 1996 | Brian Conz | 14 | Olds | DAY | ATL | SLM | TAL | FIF | LVL | CLT | CLT | KIL | FRS | POC | MCH | FRS | TOL | POC | MCH; 14 | INF | SBS | ISF | DSF | KIL | SLM | WIN | CLT; 41 | ATL | N/A | 0 | |
| 1997 | Brian Conz | 14 | Olds | DAY; DNQ | ATL | SLM | CLT | CLT | POC | | | | | | | | | | | | | | | | | | | | N/A | 0 | |
| 1997 | Brian Conz | 76 | Chevy | | | | | | | MCH; 19 | SBS | TOL | KIL | FRS | MIN | POC | MCH; 37 | DSF | GTW | SLM | WIN | CLT | TAL; DNQ | | | | | | N/A | 0 | |
| 1997 | Wayne Peterson Racing | 06 | Pontiac | | | | | | | | | | | | | | | | | | | | TAL; 17 | ISF | ATL; 19 | | | | N/A | 0 | |
| 1998 | Wayne Peterson Racing | 06 | Pontiac | DAY; 30 | ATL; 36 | | CLT; 24 | | | POC; 25 | | | PPR; 31 | | | | | ATL; 26 | | | TEX; 12 | | CLT; 26 | TAL; 21 | ATL; 27 | | | | 10th | 3785 | |
| 1998 | | 35 | Chevy | | | SLM; 13 | | | | | | | | | | | | | | | | | | | | | | | 10th | 3785 | |
| 1998 | | 36 | Chevy | | | | | MEM; 34 | | | | | | | | | | | | | | | | | | | | | 10th | 3785 | |
| 1998 | Wayne Peterson Racing | 06 | Chevy | | | | | | MCH; 19 | | SBS; 20 | TOL; 24 | | POC; 15 | KIL; 23 | FRS; 23 | | | | | | | | | | | | | 10th | 3785 | |
| 1998 | James Hylton Motorsports | 44 | Chevy | | | | | | | | | | | | | | ISF; 28 | | DSF; 20 | | | | | | | | | | 10th | 3785 | |
| 1998 | James Hylton Motorsports | 44 | Pontiac | | | | | | | | | | | | | | | | | SLM; 21 | | | | | | | | | 10th | 3785 | |
| 1998 | James Hylton Motorsports | 44 | Buick | | | | | | | | | | | | | | | | | | | WIN; 16 | | | | | | | 10th | 3785 | |
| 1999 | Wayne Peterson Racing | 06 | Pontiac | DAY; DNQ | ATL; 23 | SLM | AND | CLT | MCH; DNQ | POC | TOL | SBS | BLN | POC | KIL | FRS | FLM | ISF | WIN | DSF | SLM | CLT; DNQ | | | | | | | 86th | 215 | |
| 1999 | Wayne Peterson Racing | 06 | Chevy | | | | | | | | | | | | | | | | | | | | TAL; DNQ | ATL | | | | | 86th | 215 | |
| 2000 | Brian Conz | 18 | Chevy | DAY; DNQ | SLM | AND | CLT | KIL | FRS | MCH; DNQ | POC | TOL | KEN | BLN; 31 | POC | WIN | ISF | KEN | DSF | SLM | CLT | TAL | ATL | | | | | | 114th | 125 | |
| 2001 | Wayne Peterson Racing | 6 | Chevy | DAY | NSH | WIN | SLM | GTY | KEN | CLT | KAN | MCH | POC | MEM | GLN | KEN | MCH | POC | NSH | ISF | CHI | DSF | SLM | TOL | BLN | CLT | TAL; 23 | ATL | 155th | 110 | |
| 2002 | Brian Conz | 6 | Chevy | DAY | ATL | NSH | SLM | KEN | CLT | KAN | POC | MCH; 20 | | | KEN; 28 | BLN | POC | NSH | ISF | WIN | DSF | CHI; 12 | SLM | | | | | | 54th | 535 | |
| 2002 | Wayne Peterson Racing | 06 | Chevy | | | | | | | | | | TOL; DNQ | SBO | | | | | | | | | | | | | | | 54th | 535 | |
| 2002 | Brian Conz | 18 | Chevy | | | | | | | | | | | | | | | | | | | | | TAL; 22 | CLT | | | | 54th | 535 | |
| 2003 | Anthony Desmond | 78 | Chevy | DAY; DNQ | ATL | NSH | SLM | TOL | | | | | | | | | | ISF; 35 | | DSF; 38 | | | | | | | | | 18th | 1720 | |
| 2003 | Wayne Peterson Racing | 6 | Chevy | | | | | | KEN; 32 | CLT; 33 | BLN; 24 | KAN; 30 | MCH; 41 | LER | POC; 21 | POC; 28 | NSH; 39 | | | | CHI; 32 | | | | | | | | 18th | 1720 | |
| 2003 | Wayne Peterson Racing | 0 | Chevy | | | | | | | | | | | | | | | | WIN; DNQ | | | | | | | | | | 18th | 1720 | |
| 2003 | Wayne Peterson Racing | 00 | Chevy | | | | | | | | | | | | | | | | | | | SLM; 35 | | | | | | | 18th | 1720 | |
| 2003 | Wayne Peterson Racing | 75 | Chevy | | | | | | | | | | | | | | | | | | | | TAL; 37 | CLT | SBO | | | | 18th | 1720 | |
| 2007 | Sadler Brothers Racing | 8 | Dodge | DAY; 37 | USA | NSH | SLM | KAN | WIN | KEN | TOL | IOW | POC | MCH | BLN | KEN | POC | NSH | ISF | MIL | GTW | DSF | CHI | SLM | TAL | TOL | | | 177th | 45 | |
| 2008 | Corrie Stott Racing | 86 | Dodge | DAY; DNQ | SLM | IOW | KAN | CAR | KEN | TOL | POC | MCH | CAY | KEN | BLN | POC | NSH | ISF | DSF | CHI | SLM | NJE | TAL | TOL | | | | | N/A | 0 | |
