= Robert Burroughs =

American racing driver

- Born: July 7, 1953 (age 73); Laurel, Mississippi, U.S.

ARCA Menards Series career
- 32 races run over 4 years
- Best finish: 16th (2001)
- First race: 1999 Winn Dixie 300 (Talladega)
- Last race: 2002 EasyCare Vehicle Services Contracts 100 (Charlotte)
Wins	Top tens	Poles
0	15	0
- Statistics up to date as of November 27, 2024.

Robert Burroughs (born July 7, 1953) is an American former professional stock car racing driver who has competed in the ARCA Re/Max Series from 1999 to 2002.

Burroughs has also previously competed in the NASCAR Southeast Series, the NASCAR Southwest Series, the Southern All Star Super Late Model Series, and the USAR Hooters Late Model Series.

== Motorsports results ==
=== ARCA Re/Max Series ===
(key) (Bold – Pole position awarded by qualifying time. Italics – Pole position earned by points standings or practice time. * – Most laps led. ** – All laps led.)

ARCA Re/Max Series results
Year	Team	No.	Make	1	2	3	4	5	6	7	8	9	10	11	12	13	14	15	16	17	18	19	20	21	22	23	24	25	ARMSC	Pts	Ref
1999	Burroughs Motorsports	53	Chevy	DAY	ATL	SLM	AND	CLT	MCH	POC	TOL	SBS	BLN	POC	KIL	FRS	FLM	ISF	WIN	DSF	SLM	CLT	TAL; 10	ATL					94th	180	
2000	Burroughs Motorsports	53	Chevy	DAY; 9	SLM	AND																							36th	910	
2000	Burroughs Motorsports	53	Pontiac				CLT; 26	KIL	FRS	MCH; 8	POC; DNQ	TOL	KEN; DNQ	BLN	POC; 13	WIN	ISF	KEN; DNQ	DSF	SLM	CLT; DNQ	TAL; 27	ATL; 27						36th	910	
2001	Burroughs Motorsports	53	Chevy	DAY; 31						CLT; 21	KAN; Wth	MCH; 19			GLN; 4	KEN											TAL; 8	ATL; 9	16th	2600	
2001	Burroughs Motorsports	53	Pontiac		NSH; 27	WIN	SLM	GTY; 6	KEN; 7				POC; 34	MEM; 12			MCH; 7	POC; 5	NSH; 4	ISF	CHI; 8	DSF; 16	SLM	TOL	BLN	CLT			16th	2600	
2002	Burroughs Motorsports	53	Pontiac	DAY; 10																				TAL; 30					23rd	1475	
2002	Burroughs Motorsports	53	Ford		ATL; 29												POC; 24								CLT; 36				23rd	1475	
2002	Burroughs Motorsports	53	Chevy			NSH; 21	SLM; 13	KEN	CLT; 9	KAN	POC	MCH	TOL	SBO	KEN	BLN		NSH; 2	ISF	WIN	DSF	CHI	SLM						23rd	1475	
