= Eric Martin (racing driver) =

American racing driver

- Nationality: American
- Born: February 6, 1969 Hixson, Tennessee, U.S.
- Died: October 9, 2002 (aged 33) Concord, North Carolina, U.S.

ARCA Racing Series
- Years active: 2001–2002
- Teams: Hixson Motorsports
- Starts: 40
- Wins: 0
- Poles: 0
- Best finish: 17th in 2001

Eric Duane Martin (February 6, 1969 – October 9, 2002) was an American ARCA driver from Hixson, Tennessee, who was killed at the Lowe's Motor Speedway on October 9, 2002, during a practice session for the season-ending EasyCare 100.

He was not related to Mark Martin despite sharing a same last name.

Martin initially spun and backed into the fourth turn wall, coming to rest on the racing line entering the tri-oval. A fairly routine and innocuous accident, Martin radioed his crew that he was fine. However, 16 seconds after the initial crash, just as Martin was unbuckling his belts, Deborah Renshaw, going full speed along the racing line in the belief that the track was clear, careened directly into the driver's side door of Martin at about 160 mph and killed him instantly.

Both ARCA and Renshaw were roundly criticized following the accident. ARCA received criticism because its regulations did not require spotters to be located on top of the grandstands. Renshaw's spotter was standing on top of the team trailer, and thus could not see the wreck and communicate its location to his driver. Thus, in spite of the fact that 16 seconds, an eternity in racing, passed between the initial crash and the fatal second collision, not all the drivers were notified of the crash. Renshaw was herself criticized, because although several other cars with similarly situated spotters managed to see Martin in time and slow considerably before avoiding him, Renshaw did not see the car stopped on the racing line until it was much too late to avoid the fatal collision. In the aftermath of the accident, ARCA mandated that each car that went onto the track had to have an assigned spotter in the spotter's stand, and a yellow warning light was mandated for the car's dashboard that illuminated when a caution was declared on the race track. Eric left behind two sons, Brian and Matt Martin.

Martin had 40 starts in the ARCA Re/Max Series.

== Motorsports career results ==
=== ARCA Re/Max Series ===
(key) (Bold – Pole position awarded by qualifying time. Italics – Pole position earned by points standings or practice time. * – Most laps led.)

ARCA Re/Max Series results
Year	Team	No.	Make	1	2	3	4	5	6	7	8	9	10	11	12	13	14	15	16	17	18	19	20	21	22	23	24	25	ARSC	Pts	Ref
2001	Hixson Motorsports	56	Chevy	DAY	NSH	WIN; 30	SLM; 30	GTY; 35	KEN; 37	CLT; 36	KAN; 37	MCH; 39	POC; 33		GLN; 25	KEN; 35	MCH; 33	POC; 32		ISF; 33		DSF; 40		TOL; 30	BLN; 31	CLT; 36	TAL; 28	ATL; 40	17th	2480	
2001	Bob Schacht Motorsports	75	Pontiac											MEM; 35															17th	2480	
2001	Martin Racing	91	Chevy																			CHI; 38		SLM; 33					17th	2480	
2001	Hixson Motorsports	56	Ford																NSH; 16										17th	2480	
2002	Hixson Motorsports	56	Chevy	DAY; DNQ	ATL; DNQ	NSH; 23	SLM; 30	KEN; 26	CLT; 40	KAN; 21	POC; 25	MCH; 31	TOL; 35	SBO; 26															19th	2990	
2002	Hixson Motorsports	2	Chevy												KEN; 37	BLN; 28	POC; 33	NSH; 31	ISF; 23	WIN; 32	DSF; 14	CHI; 18	SLM; 27	TAL; DNQ	CLT; Wth				19th	2990	
