= Randal Ritter =

American racing driver (born 1947)

- Born: January 20, 1947 (age 79); Franklin, Tennessee, U.S.

ARCA Menards Series career
- 16 races run over 10 years
- Best finish: 76th (2001), (2002)
- First race: 1995 ARCA 200 (Daytona)
- Last race: 2004 PFG Lester 150 (Nashville)
Wins	Top tens	Poles
0	2	0
- Statistics up to date as of February 4, 2025.

Randal "Randy" Ritter (born January 20, 1947) is an American professional stock car racing driver who has previously competed in the ARCA Re/Max Series from 1995 to 2004.

Ritter has also competed in the ASA National Tour, the NASCAR All-American Challenge Series, the ALL PRO Super Series, and the NASCAR Advance Auto Parts Weekly Series.

== Motorsports results ==
=== NASCAR ===
(key) (Bold - Pole position awarded by qualifying time. Italics - Pole position earned by points standings or practice time. * – Most laps led.)

==== Winston Cup Series ====
NASCAR Winston Cup Series results
Year	Team	No.	Make	1	2	3	4	5	6	7	8	9	10	11	12	13	14	15	16	17	18	19	20	21	22	23	24	25	26	27	28	29	30	31	32	33	NWCC	Pts	Ref
1998	Randal Ritter	68	Chevy	DAY	CAR	LVS	ATL	DAR	BRI	TEX	MAR	TAL	CAL	CLT	DOV	RCH	MCH	POC	SON	NHA	POC	IND	GLN	MCH	BRI	NHA	DAR	RCH	DOV	MAR	CLT	TAL	DAY; Wth	PHO	CAR	ATL	N/A	0	

=== ARCA Re/Max Series ===
(key) (Bold – Pole position awarded by qualifying time. Italics – Pole position earned by points standings or practice time. * – Most laps led.)

ARCA Re/Max Series results
Year	Team	No.	Make	1	2	3	4	5	6	7	8	9	10	11	12	13	14	15	16	17	18	19	20	21	22	23	24	25	ARSC	Pts	Ref
1995	Randal Ritter	31	Chevy	DAY; 9	ATL	TAL; 30	FIF	KIL	FRS	MCH	I80	MCS	FRS	POC	POC	KIL	FRS	SBS	LVL	ISF	DSF	SLM	WIN	ATL					N/A	0	
1996	Randal Ritter	31	Chevy	DAY; 35	ATL	SLM	TAL	FIF	LVL	CLT	CLT; DNQ	KIL	FRS	POC	MCH	FRS	TOL	POC	MCH	INF	SBS	ISF	DSF	KIL	SLM	WIN	CLT	ATL	N/A	0	
1997	Randal Ritter	31	Chevy	DAY; DNQ	ATL	SLM	CLT	CLT	POC	MCH	SBS	TOL	KIL	FRS	MIN	POC	MCH	DSF	GTW	SLM	WIN	CLT	TAL; 30	ISF	ATL				N/A	0	
1998	Randal Ritter	31	Chevy	DAY; 23	ATL	SLM	CLT	MEM	MCH	POC	SBS	TOL	PPR	POC	KIL	FRS	ISF	ATL	DSF	SLM	TEX	WIN	CLT	TAL	ATL				N/A	0	
1999	Randal Ritter	31	Chevy	DAY	ATL	SLM	AND	CLT	MCH	POC	TOL	SBS	BLN	POC	KIL	FRS	FLM	ISF	WIN	DSF	SLM	CLT	TAL; 40	ATL					146th	30	
2000	Randal Ritter	31	Chevy	DAY; 36	SLM	AND	CLT	KIL	FRS	MCH	POC	TOL	KEN	BLN	POC	WIN	ISF	KEN	DSF	SLM	CLT	TAL; 35	ATL						122nd	105	
2001	Randal Ritter	31	Chevy	DAY; DNQ	NSH; 17	WIN	SLM	GTY	KEN	CLT	KAN	MCH	POC	MEM	GLN	KEN	MCH	POC	NSH; 6	ISF	CHI	DSF	SLM	TOL	BLN	CLT	TAL; 32	ATL	76th	445	
2002	Randal Ritter	31	Chevy	DAY; 17	ATL	NSH; 41	SLM	KEN	CLT	KAN	POC	MCH	TOL	SBO	KEN	BLN	POC	NSH; 30	ISF	WIN	DSF	CHI	SLM	TAL; 18	CLT				76th	395	
2003	Randal Ritter	31	Chevy	DAY; 41	ATL	NSH	SLM	TOL	KEN	CLT	BLN	KAN	MCH	LER	POC	POC	NSH	ISF	WIN	DSF	CHI	SLM	TAL	CLT	SBO				N/A	0	
2004	Jerry Criswell	31	Chevy	DAY	NSH; 21	SLM	KEN	TOL	CLT	KAN	POC	MCH	SBO	BLN	KEN	GTW	POC	LER	NSH	ISF	TOL	DSF	CHI	SLM	TAL				145th	125	
