= Keith Segars =

American racing driver

- Born: September 29, 1961 (age 65); Jacksonville, Florida, U.S.

ARCA Menards Series career
- 19 races run over 8 years
- Best finish: 84th (2003)
- First race: 1986 Talladega ARCA 500k (Talladega)
- Last race: 2003 Food World 300 (Talladega)
- First win: 2002 Food World 300 (Talladega)
Wins	Top tens	Poles
1	6	0
- Statistics up to date as of November 27, 2024.

Keith Segars (born September 29, 1961) is an American former professional stock car racing driver who has previously competed in the ARCA Re/Max Series.

Segars has also competed in the All PRO Pickup Truck Series.

== Motorsports career results ==
=== ARCA Re/Max Series ===
(key) (Bold – Pole position awarded by qualifying time. Italics – Pole position earned by points standings or practice time. * – Most laps led. ** – All laps led.)

ARCA Re/Max Series results
Year	Team	No.	Make	1	2	3	4	5	6	7	8	9	10	11	12	13	14	15	16	17	18	19	20	21	22	23	24	25	ARMSC	Pts	Ref
1986	N/A	14	Chevy	ATL	DAY	ATL	TAL; 28	SIR	SSP	FRS	KIL	CSP	TAL; 22	BLN	ISF	DSF	TOL	MCS	ATL; DNQ										N/A	0	
1987	Ed Segars	55	Chevy	DAY; 17	ATL; 6	TAL; 25	DEL	ACS	TOL	ROC	POC	FRS	KIL	TAL; 5	FRS	ISF	INF	DSF	SLM	ATL; 39									N/A	0	
1988	Ed Segars	55	Chevy	DAY; 41	ATL	TAL; 23	FRS	PCS	ROC	POC	WIN	KIL	ACS	SLM	POC	TAL; 3	DEL	FRS	ISF	DSF	SLM	ATL; 13							N/A	0	
1989	Ed Segars	55	Chevy	DAY; 11	ATL; 24	KIL	TAL; DNQ	FRS	POC	KIL	HAG	POC	TAL; DNQ	DEL	FRS	ISF	TOL	DSF	SLM	ATL									N/A	0	
1990	Ed Segars	55	Chevy	DAY; DNQ	ATL	KIL	TAL	FRS	POC	KIL	TOL	HAG	POC	TAL	MCH	ISF	TOL	DSF	WIN	DEL	ATL								N/A	0	
2001	Keith Segars	04	Chevy	DAY; 10	NSH	WIN	SLM	GTY	KEN	CLT	KAN	MCH	POC	MEM	GLN	KEN	MCH	POC	NSH	ISF	CHI	DSF	SLM	TOL	BLN	CLT			109th	225	
2001	Keith Segars	04	Pontiac																								TAL; 37	ATL	109th	225	
2002	Morgan–McClure Motorsports	04	Chevy	DAY; 40	ATL	NSH	SLM	KEN	CLT	KAN	POC	MCH	TOL	SBO	KEN	BLN	POC	NSH	ISF	WIN	DSF	CHI	SLM	TAL; 1*	CLT				95th	300	
2003	Keith Segars	04	Chevy	DAY; 4	ATL	NSH	SLM	TOL	KEN	CLT	BLN	KAN	MCH	LER	POC	POC	NSH	ISF	WIN	DSF	CHI	SLM							84th	325	
2003	Morgan–McClure Motorsports	04	Chevy																				TAL; 23	CLT	SBO				84th	325	
