= John Metcalf (racing driver) =

American racing driver (1948–2020)

- Born: February 14, 1948; Aurora, Colorado, U.S.
- Died: July 10, 2020 (aged 72)

ARCA Menards Series career
- 10 races run over 3 years
- Best finish: 38th (2002)
- First race: 1999 FirstPlus Financial 200 (Daytona)
- Last race: 2002 Waste Management 200 (Nashville)
Wins	Top tens	Poles
0	7	1
- Statistics up to date as of November 6, 2024.

John Metcalf (born February 14, 1948 – July 10, 2020) was an American professional stock car racing driver who competed in the ARCA Re/Max Series and the NASCAR Winston West Series.

Metcalf also competed in series such as the NASCAR Midwest Series, the NASCAR Northwest Series, the NASCAR Southeast Series, and the World Series of Asphalt Stock Car Racing.

== Motorsports career results ==
=== NASCAR ===
(key) (Bold - Pole position awarded by qualifying time. Italics - Pole position earned by points standings or practice time. * – Most laps led.)

==== Winston Cup Series ====
NASCAR Winston Cup Series results
Year	Team	No.	Make	1	2	3	4	5	6	7	8	9	10	11	12	13	14	15	16	17	18	19	20	21	22	23	24	25	26	27	28	29	30	31	32	33	34	NWCC	Pts	Ref
1999	Metcalf Motorsports	70	Chevy	DAY	CAR	LVS	ATL	DAR	TEX	BRI	MAR	TAL	CAL	RCH	CLT	DOV	MCH	POC	SON; DNQ	DAY	NHA	POC	IND	GLN	MCH	BRI	DAR	RCH	NHA	DOV	MAR	CLT	TAL	CAR	PHO	HOM	ATL	N/A	0	

==== Winston West Series ====
NASCAR Winston West Series results
Year	Team	No.	Make	1	2	3	4	5	6	7	8	9	10	11	12	13	14	NWWSC	Pts	Ref
1999	Team Re/MAX Racing	05	Chevy	TUS; 5	LVS; 35	PHO; 11	CAL; 28	PPR; 12	MMR; 18	IRW; 12	EVG; 7	POR; 23	IRW; 17	RMR; 15	LVS; 14	MMR; 21	MOT; 10	14th	1620	
2000	Team Re/MAX Racing	05	Chevy	PHO; 12	MMR; 6	LVS; 5	CAL; 14	LAG; 18	IRW; 7	POR; 8	EVG; 4	IRW; 14	RMR; 13	MMR; 3				4th	1705	
2000	Team Re/MAX Racing	57	Chevy												IRW; 4			4th	1705	
2001	Team Re/MAX Racing	05	Chevy	PHO; 28	LVS	TUS	MMR	CAL	IRW	LAG	KAN	EVG	CNS	IRW	RMR	LVS; 4	IRW	39th	239	
2002	Team Re/MAX Racing	05	Chevy	PHO	LVS	CAL	KAN; 4	EVG	IRW	S99	RMR	DCS	LVS					40th	160	

=== ARCA Re/Max Series ===
(key) (Bold – Pole position awarded by qualifying time. Italics – Pole position earned by points standings or practice time. * – Most laps led.)

ARCA Re/Max Series results
Year	Team	No.	Make	1	2	3	4	5	6	7	8	9	10	11	12	13	14	15	16	17	18	19	20	21	22	23	24	25	ARSC	Pts	Ref
1999	Team Re/MAX Racing	05	Chevy	DAY; 13	ATL	SLM	AND	CLT	MCH	POC	TOL	SBS	BLN	POC	KIL	FRS	FLM	ISF	WIN	DSF	SLM	CLT	TAL	ATL					100th	165	
2001	Team Re/MAX Racing	05	Chevy	DAY	NSH	WIN	SLM	GTY	KEN; 9	CLT	KAN; 6	MCH	POC	MEM	GLN	KEN; 2	MCH	POC	NSH; 24	ISF	CHI; 5	DSF	SLM	TOL	BLN	CLT	TAL	ATL	39th	930	
2002	Team Re/MAX Racing	05	Chevy	DAY	ATL	NSH; 33	SLM	**KEN**; 4	CLT	KAN	POC	MCH	TOL	SBO	KEN; 7	BLN	POC	NSH; 5	ISF	WIN	DSF	CHI	SLM	TAL	CLT				38th	700	

=== 24 Hours of Daytona ===
(key)

24 Hours of Daytona results
Year	Class	No	Team	Car	Co-drivers	Laps	Position	Class Pos.
2002	AGT	90	(United States) Flis Motorsports	Chevy Corvette	(United States) Rick Carelli (United States) Kevin Harvick (United States) Davy Lee Liniger	123	69 ^{DNF}	8 ^{DNF}
2003	GTS	05	(United States) Team Re/MAX Racing	Chevy Corvette	(United States) Rick Carelli (United States) Craig Conway (United States) Davy Lee Liniger	378	27 ^{DNF}	8 ^{DNF}
