= Tom Sokoloski =

American racing driver and crew chief

- Born: Grand Rapids, Michigan, U.S.

ARCA Menards Series career
- 2 races run over 2 years
- Best finish: 182nd (2001)
- First race: 1996 Syracuse Grand Prix 400k (Pocono)
- Last race: 2001 Michigan ARCA Re/Max 200 (Michigan)
Wins	Top tens	Poles
0	0	0
- Statistics up to date as of April 10, 2025.

Tom Sokoloski (birth date unknown) is an American former professional stock car racing driver and crew chief who competed in the ARCA Bondo/Mar-Hyde Series for two races in 1996 and 2001, scoring a best finish of 30th at Pocono Raceway in the former year. He also served as the crew chief for Tim Steele in the same series, where the two won three championships together between 1993 and 1997. After 2002, Sokoloski went on to serve as a crew chief for ML Motorsports.

== Motorsports results ==
=== ARCA Re/Max Series ===
(key) (Bold – Pole position awarded by qualifying time. Italics – Pole position earned by points standings or practice time. * – Most laps led.)

ARCA Re/Max Series results
Year	Team	No.	Make	1	2	3	4	5	6	7	8	9	10	11	12	13	14	15	16	17	18	19	20	21	22	23	24	25	ARMC	Pts	Ref
1996	Steele Racing	18	Ford	DAY	ATL	SLM	TAL	FIF	LVL	CLT	CLT	KIL	FRS	POC; 30	MCH	FRS	TOL	POC	MCH	INF	SBS	ISF	DSF	KIL	SLM	WIN	CLT	ATL	N/A	0	
2001	Steele Racing	18	Ford	DAY	NSH	WIN	SLM	GTY	KEN	CLT	KAN	MCH	POC	MEM	GLN	KEN	MCH; 37	POC	NSH	ISF	CHI	DSF	SLM	TOL	BLN	CLT	TAL	ATL	182nd	45	
