= Slagh =

Slagh is a surname. Notable people with the surname include:

- Bradley Slagh, American politician
- Vern Slagh (born 1940), American racing driver
