= Dick Tracey (racing driver) =

American stock car racing driver (born 1945)

- Born: September 27, 1945 (age 81); Columbus, Georgia, U.S.

ARCA Menards Series career
- 33 races run over 10 years
- Best finish: 32nd (2001)
- First race: 1991 Wendy's Big Classic 100 (Topeka)
- Last race: 2003 Giant 200 (Pocono)
Wins	Top tens	Poles
0	0	0
- Statistics up to date as of November 30, 2024.

Dick Tracey (born September 27, 1945) is an American former professional stock car racing driver who has competed in the ARCA Re/Max Series from 1991 to 2003.

== Motorsports results ==
=== ARCA Re/Max Series ===
(key) (Bold – Pole position awarded by qualifying time. Italics – Pole position earned by points standings or practice time. * – Most laps led. ** – All laps led.)

ARCA Re/Max Series results
Year	Team	No.	Make	1	2	3	4	5	6	7	8	9	10	11	12	13	14	15	16	17	18	19	20	21	22	23	24	25	ARMSC	Pts	Ref
1991	N/A	1	Olds	DAY	ATL	KIL	TAL	TOL	FRS	POC	MCH	KIL	FRS	DEL	POC	TAL	HPT; 21	MCH											N/A	0	
1991	N/A	1	Buick																ISF; 30	TOL	DSF	TWS	ATL						N/A	0	
1994	Betty Adams	17	Buick	DAY	TAL	FIF; 24	LVL	KIL	TOL	FRS	MCH	DMS; 29	POC	POC	KIL	FRS	INF	I70	ISF	DSF	TOL	SLM	WIN	ATL					N/A	0	
1996	N/A	22	Chevy	DAY	ATL	SLM	TAL; 40																						N/A	0	
1996	Jan Brewer	75	Chevy					FIF; 21	LVL																				N/A	0	
1996	Jan Brewer	1	Chevy							CLT; 34	CLT; 22	KIL	FRS																N/A	0	
1996	Jan Brewer	7	Chevy											POC; 21	MCH	FRS	TOL	POC	MCH	INF	SBS	ISF	DSF	KIL	SLM	WIN	CLT	ATL	N/A	0	
1997	Dick Tracey	02	Chevy	DAY; DNQ	ATL; 26	SLM	CLT	CLT	POC; 17	MCH; 25	SBS	TOL	KIL	FRS	MIN; 29	POC; 22	MCH; 27	DSF	GTW; 34	SLM	WIN	CLT							N/A	0	
1997	Dick Tracey	12	Chevy																				TAL; DNQ	ISF	ATL; 28				N/A	0	
1998	Jan Brewer	12	Chevy	DAY; DNQ																									N/A	0	
1998	Dick Tracey	12	Chevy		ATL; 37	SLM	CLT	MEM	MCH	POC	SBS	TOL	PPR	POC; 32	KIL	FRS	ISF	ATL	DSF	SLM	TEX	WIN	CLT	TAL	ATL				N/A	0	
1999	Dick Tracey	02	Chevy	DAY; DNQ	ATL	SLM	AND	CLT	MCH	POC	TOL	SBS	BLN	POC; DNQ	KIL	FRS	FLM; 28	ISF	WIN	DSF	SLM	CLT	TAL; DNQ	ATL; DNQ					111th	140	
2000	Dick Tracey	02	Chevy	DAY; DNQ	SLM	AND	CLT	KIL	FRS	MCH	POC	TOL	KEN	BLN	POC; DNQ	WIN	ISF	KEN	DSF	SLM	CLT	TAL; DNQ	ATL						N/A	0	
2001	Dick Tracey	02	Chevy	DAY	NSH	WIN	SLM	GTY; 32	KEN; 38	CLT										ISF; DNQ	CHI; 25	DSF; 38	SLM	TOL	BLN	CLT; DNQ	TAL; DNQ	ATL; DNQ	32nd	1255	
2001	Roulo Brothers Racing	39	Chevy								KAN; 36	MCH	POC; 31	MEM; 34	GLN; 26	KEN; 31	MCH; 32	POC; 21											32nd	1255	
2001	N/A	16	Chevy																NSH; 27										32nd	1255	
2002	Dick Tracey	02	Chevy	DAY; DNQ	ATL	NSH; Wth	SLM	KEN	CLT	KAN	POC	MCH	TOL	SBO	KEN	BLN	POC	NSH; DNQ	ISF	WIN; Wth	DSF	CHI; 34	SLM	TAL	CLT				154th	95	
2002	Cunningham Motorsports	4	Chevy															NSH; 39											154th	95	
2003	Dick Tracey	99	Chevy	DAY; DNQ	ATL; DNQ								MCH; DNQ	LER	POC; 32	POC; DNQ	NSH	ISF	WIN	DSF	CHI	SLM	TAL	CLT	SBO				130th	170	
2003	Dick Tracey	83	Chevy			NSH; DNQ	SLM	TOL	KEN	CLT	BLN	KAN																	130th	170	
