= Vern Slagh =

American racing driver (born 1940)

- Born: January 17, 1940 (age 86); Zeeland, Michigan, U.S.

NASCAR O'Reilly Auto Parts Series career
- 1 race run over 1 year
- Best finish: 136th (2003)
- First race: 2003 Cabela's 250 (Michigan)
Wins	Top tens	Poles
0	0	0

ARCA Menards Series career
- 24 races run over 5 years
- Best finish: 35th (2001)
- First race: 2000 Flagstar 200 (Michigan)
- Last race: 2004 The Channel 5 205 (Kentucky)
Wins	Top tens	Poles
0	3	1
- Statistics up to date as of November 20, 2024.

Vern Slagh (born January 17, 1940) is an American former professional stock car racing driver who has previously competed in the NASCAR Busch Series and the ARCA Re/Max Series.

Slagh has also competed in the NASCAR Southeast Series, the ASA CRA Super Series, the ARTGO Challenge Series, and the Iceman Super Car Series.

== Motorsports career results ==
=== NASCAR ===
(key) (Bold - Pole position awarded by qualifying time. Italics - Pole position earned by points standings or practice time. * – Most laps led.)

==== Busch Series ====
NASCAR Busch Series results
Year	Team	No.	Make	1	2	3	4	5	6	7	8	9	10	11	12	13	14	15	16	17	18	19	20	21	22	23	24	25	26	27	28	29	30	31	32	33	34	NBSC	Pts	Ref
2003	PBM Racing	65	Chevy	DAY	CAR	LVS	DAR	BRI	TEX	TAL	NSH	CAL	RCH	GTY	NZH	CLT	DOV	NSH	KEN	MLW	DAY	CHI	NHA	PPR	IRP	MCH; 30	BRI	DAR	RCH	DOV	KAN	CLT	MEM	ATL	PHO	CAR	HOM	136th	73	

=== ARCA Re/Max Series ===
(key) (Bold – Pole position awarded by qualifying time. Italics – Pole position earned by points standings or practice time. * – Most laps led. ** – All laps led.)

ARCA Re/Max Series results
Year	Team	No.	Make	1	2	3	4	5	6	7	8	9	10	11	12	13	14	15	16	17	18	19	20	21	22	23	24	25	ARMSC	Pts	Ref
2000	PBM Racing	65	Ford	DAY	SLM	AND	CLT	KIL	FRS	MCH; 41	POC	TOL; 21	KEN	BLN; 5	POC	WIN; 17	ISF	KEN	DSF	SLM	CLT	TAL	ATL						53rd	510	
2001	PBM Racing	65	Chevy	DAY; 32	NSH																								35th	1105	
2001	PBM Racing	65	Ford			WIN; 5	SLM; 22	GTY	KEN	CLT	KAN	MCH; 16	POC	MEM	GLN	KEN	MCH; 11	POC	NSH	ISF	CHI	DSF	SLM; 26	TOL	BLN; 24	CLT	TAL		35th	1105	
2001	PBM Racing	65	Pontiac																									ATL; 32	35th	1105	
2002	PBM Racing	65	Ford	DAY; 22	ATL	NSH; Wth	SLM	KEN; 34	CLT	KAN	POC	MCH; 14	TOL; 8	SBO	**KEN**; 40	BLN	POC	NSH	ISF	WIN	DSF	CHI	SLM	TAL; DNQ	CLT				45th	615	
2003	PBM Racing	22	Pontiac	DAY; 39																									65th	460	
2003	PBM Racing	65	Dodge		ATL; 37	NSH	SLM		KEN; 37	CLT	BLN; 31	KAN	MCH; 17	LER	POC	POC	NSH	ISF	WIN; DNQ	DSF	CHI	SLM	TAL; 38	CLT	SBO				65th	460	
2003	PBM Racing	65	Chevy					TOL; 31																					65th	460	
2004	Brack Maggard Racing	65	Dodge	DAY; QL^{†}	NSH	SLM																							180th	60	
2004	PBM Racing	65	Dodge				KEN; 39	TOL	CLT	KAN	POC	MCH	SBO	BLN	KEN	GTW	POC	LER	NSH	ISF	TOL	DSF	CHI	SLM	TAL				180th	60	
^{†} - Qualified but replaced by Brack Maggard
