= Bob Aiello =

American racing driver

- Born: November 7, 1967 (age 59); Covington, Georgia, U.S.

ARCA Menards Series career
- 13 races run over 4 years
- Best finish: 50th (2003)
- First race: 2001 EasyCare Vehicle Services Contracts 100 (Charlotte)
- Last race: 2004 ARCA Re/Max 200 (South Boston)
| Wins | Top tens | Poles |
|---|---|---|
| 0 | 1 | 0 |
- Statistics up to date as of December 1, 2024.

Bob Aiello (born November 7, 1967) is an American former professional stock car racing driver and team owner who has competed in the ARCA Re/Max Series from 2001 to 2004.

== Motorsports results ==
=== ARCA Re/Max Series ===
(key) (Bold – Pole position awarded by qualifying time. Italics – Pole position earned by points standings or practice time. * – Most laps led. ** – All laps led.)

ARCA Re/Max Series results
| Year | Team | No. | Make | 1 | 2 | 3 | 4 | 5 | 6 | 7 | 8 | 9 | 10 | 11 | 12 | 13 | 14 | 15 | 16 | 17 | 18 | 19 | 20 | 21 | 22 | 23 | 24 | 25 | ARMSC | Pts | Ref |
|---|---|---|---|---|---|---|---|---|---|---|---|---|---|---|---|---|---|---|---|---|---|---|---|---|---|---|---|---|---|---|---|
| 2001 | Bob Aiello | 62 | Ford | DAY | NSH | WIN | SLM | GTY | KEN | CLT | KAN | MCH | POC | MEM | GLN | KEN | MCH | POC | NSH | ISF | CHI | DSF | SLM | TOL | BLN | CLT; 17 | TAL | ATL; 12 | 92nd | 315 | |
| 2002 | Bob Aiello | 62 | Ford | DAY | ATL; 27 | NSH | SLM | KEN | CLT; DNQ | | | | | | KEN; 17 | BLN | POC | NSH | ISF | WIN | DSF | | | | CLT; 29 | | | | 52nd | 540 | |
| 2002 | Bobby Gerhart Racing | 5 | Ford | | | | | | | KAN; 20 | POC | MCH | TOL | SBO | | | | | | | | | | | | | | | 52nd | 540 | |
| 2002 | Bob Aiello | 7 | Ford | | | | | | | | | | | | | | | | | | | CHI; 17 | SLM | TAL | | | | | 52nd | 540 | |
| 2003 | Bob Aiello | 62 | Ford | DAY | ATL; 12 | NSH; DNQ | SLM | TOL | KEN | CLT; 20 | BLN | KAN; 21 | MCH | LER; 13 | POC | POC | NSH | ISF | WIN | DSF | CHI | SLM | TAL | CLT | SBO | | | | 50th | 615 | |
| 2004 | Mark Gibson Racing | 56 | Chevy | DAY | NSH | SLM | KEN | TOL | CLT | KAN; 32 | POC | MCH | | | | | | | | | | | | | | | | | 89th | 275 | |
| 2004 | Bob Aiello | 62 | Ford | | | | | | | | | | SBO; 10 | BLN | KEN | GTW | POC | LER | NSH | ISF | TOL | DSF | CHI | SLM | TAL; DNQ | | | | 89th | 275 | |
