= 2001 ARCA Re/Max Series =

49th season of the ARCA Racing Series

2001 ARCA RE/MAX Series

Seasons
- ← 2000 2002 →

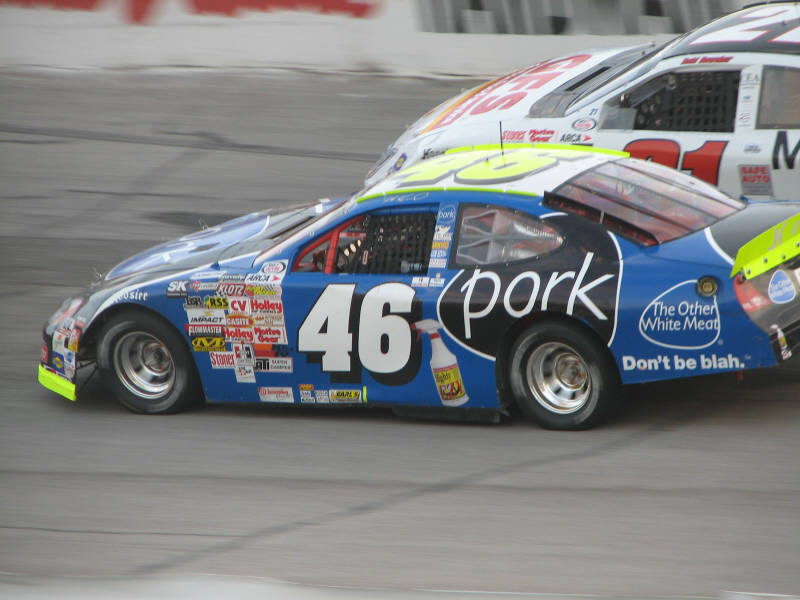
Frank Kimmel, driving the No. 46 car for Clement Racing (pictured in 2006), the 2001 ARCA champion. This was the third of his 10 championships in the series and second of 8 straight.

The 2001 ARCA Re/Max Series was the 49th season of the ARCA Racing Series, a division of the Automobile Racing Club of America (ARCA). The season began on February 11, 2001, with the Discount Auto Parts 200 at Daytona International Speedway. The season ended with the Pork. The Other White Meat 400 at Atlanta Motor Speedway on November 17. Frank Kimmel won the drivers championship, his third in the series and second in a row, and Jason Jarrett won the Rookie of the Year award. The season was marred with the deaths of Dean Roper, who suffered a heart attack during the Par-A-Dice 100 at Illinois State Fairgrounds, and Blaise Alexander, who was killed in a crash at the EasyCare Vehicle Service Contracts 100 at Lowe's Motor Speedway.

== Schedule & Winners ==
Date	Track	City	Event name	Pole winner	Race winner
February 11	Daytona International Speedway	Daytona Beach, Florida	Discount Auto Parts 200	Kirk Shelmerdine	Ryan Newman
April 13	Nashville Superspeedway	Lebanon, Tennessee	PFG Lester 150	Frank Kimmel	Ken Schrader
April 22	Winchester Speedway	White River Township, Indiana	ARCA Re/Max 250	Frank Kimmel	Tim Steele
April 29	Salem Speedway	Washington Township, Indiana	Kentuckiana Ford Dealers 200	Frank Kimmel	Frank Kimmel
May 5	Gateway International Raceway	Madison, Illinois	Gateway ARCA 150	Tim Steele	Frank Kimmel
May 12	Kentucky Speedway	Sparta, Kentucky	Kentucky ARCA 150	Frank Kimmel	Frank Kimmel
May 19	Lowe's Motor Speedway	Concord, North Carolina	EasyCare Vehicle Service Contracts 100	Tim Steele	Frank Kimmel
June 3	Kansas Speedway	Kansas City, Kansas	BPU 200	Ryan Newman	Jason Jarrett
June 9	Michigan Speedway	Brooklyn, Michigan	Flagstar 200	Jason Jarrett	Kerry Earnhardt
June 16	Pocono Raceway	Long Pond, Pennsylvania	Pocono ARCA Re/Max 200	Stuart Kirby	Tim Steele
June 22	Memphis Motorsports Park	Millington, Tennessee	Memphis ARCA 150	Rick Carelli	Billy Bigley
July 7	Watkins Glen International	Watkins Glen, New York	BETONUSA.com 150	Blaise Alexander	John Finger
July 13	Kentucky Speedway	Sparta, Kentucky	Blue Grass Quality Meats 200	Ken Schrader	Ken Schrader
July 21	Michigan International Speedway	Brooklyn, Michigan	Michigan ARCA Re/Max 200	Blaise Alexander	Blaise Alexander
July 28	Pocono Raceway	Long Pond, Pennsylvania	Pepsi ARCA 200	Stuart Kirby	Tim Steele
August 11	Nashville Superspeedway	Lebanon, Tennessee	Waste Management 200	Frank Kimmel	Frank Kimmel
August 19	Illinois State Fairgrounds	Springfield, Illinois	PAR-A-DICE 100	Frank Kimmel	Frank Kimmel
September 1	Chicagoland Speedway	Joliet, Illinois	ARCA Re/Max 200	Tim Steele	Ed Berrier
September 3	DuQuoin State Fairgrounds	Du Quoin, Illinois	Federated Auto Parts 100	Tony Stewart	Frank Kimmel
September 9	Salem Speedway	Washington Township, Indiana	Eddie Gilstrap Motors 200	Frank Kimmel	Frank Kimmel
September 16	Toledo Speedway	Toledo, Ohio	Jasper Engines & Transmissions 200	Frank Kimmel	Frank Kimmel
September 22	Berlin Raceway	Marne, Michigan	Pork. The Other White Meat 200	Frank Kimmel	Tim Steele
October 4	Lowe's Motor Speedway	Concord, North Carolina	EasyCare Vehicle Service Contracts 100	Tim Steele	Kerry Earnhardt
October 20	Talladega Superspeedway	Lincoln, Alabama	Food World 300	Bobby Gerhart	Bobby Gerhart
November 17	Atlanta Motor Speedway	Hampton, Georgia	Pork. The Other White Meat 400	Frank Kimmel	Kerry Earnhardt

=== Drivers' championship ===
(key) Bold – Pole position awarded by time. Italics – Pole position set by final practice results or rainout. * – Most laps led. ** – All laps led.

Pos.	Driver	Races																									Points
Pos.	Driver	DAY	NSH	WIN	SLM	GTY	KEN	CLT	KAN	MCH	POC	MEM	GLN	KEN	MCH	POC	NSH	ISF	CHI	DSF	SLM	TOL	BLN	CLT	TAL	ATL	Points
1	Frank Kimmel	3	**2***	**11***	**1***	1*	**1***	1*	2*	30	5	3	3	**1***	2*	3*	**1***	**1***	6*	1*	**1***	**1***	**3**	3	18	**3**	7080
2	Jason Jarrett	21	6	12	4	7	29	7	1	**29**	22	24	16	24	12	8	2	3	2	8	2	3	5	7	21	6	5900
3	Andy Belmont	16	9	3	13	23	8	9	5	5	10	19	10	15	14	12	30	6	10	7	5	2	23	11	35	26	5470
4	Ron Cox	36	11	7	7	12	16	11	10	18	12	16	13	17	13	14	23	28	12	36	9	6	7	12	30	15	5070
5	Norm Benning	30	21	14	17	18	26	14	12	22	23	11	15	11	20	18	10	26	15	30	14	9	13	16	31	19	4750
6	Todd Bowsher	26	25	9	5	27	20	31	24	14	13	18	7	4	31	35	11	21	32	17	10	17	8	22	20	20	4690
7	Chuck Weber	20	16	22	16	20	17	12	19	35	15	15	21	14	17	17	20	15	31	12	19	19	15	18	29	39	4560
8	Donny Morelock	22	22	27	14	22	11	32	13	20	16	27	11	25	15	16	13	9	28	23	12	13	20	33	34	28	4495
9	Tim Steele	25	7	1	2	**3**	2	**3**	3	9	1*	14			3	1			**3**				1**	**5**		5	4300
10	Mike Buckley	DNQ	20	19	20	25			15	15		7	14		36		15	11	14	18	11	5	27	15	12	41	3470
11	Kevin Belmont		36	26	28	31	36	34	28	36	35	10	27	32	26	15	19	24	34	34	27	29	30	39	22	14	3160
12	Darrell Basham				11		28				25		33	18		19	12	22	17		15	14	19	31	27	18	2905
13	Greg Sarff		19		29	30	18			24		21	29	10	24	37	9	27	26	41	17	15	29	23	25	37	2900
14	Brad Smith	DNQ	37	Wth			40	37	35	32	24	33	22	37	38	38	26	29	27	25	23	21	21	25	DNQ	23	2685
15	Tim Mitchell		DNQ					15	16	27	20	20		33	21	22	21	19	16	27	13	11	14	DNQ	24	DNQ	2665
16	Robert Burroughs	31	27			6	7	21	Wth	19	34	12	4		7	5	4		8	16					8	9	2600
17	Eric Martin			30	30	35	37	36	37	39	33	35	25	35	33	32	16	33	38	40	33	30	31	36	28	40	2480
18	Billy Venturini	23	26	4	23	8	13	23				30		3		20	7		4					4	33	36	2445
19	Todd Antrican		DNQ	DNQ	26	32	39		30	34	32	28	31	30	30	34	31	32	37	37	31	25	28	29	DNQ	38	2195
20	Ed Berrier					4	32	22	4	2	7			23			3		1							7	2035
21	A. J. Henriksen		14			16	27			10	27			6	22	10			7		4	8	9				1960
22	Larry Hollenbeck			10		21	21	13		12	14	17		9	8	24	34		23		28		26				1925
23	Blaise Alexander	8		28	6					6	9		**2**		**1**	2								2			1820
24	Joe Cooksey	13	28	8	21	10	15					9						8		5							1735
25	Dennis English				25							29	23	29	28		29	13	33	15	21	22		DNQ	26		1570
26	Mike Swaim Jr.	28	5			2	3	8	18		4					4											1495
27	Stuart Kirby	5	24					2		3	**3**					**27**									13	4	1495
28	Richard Mitchell						DNQ	26		13	11				5	26			9					10	5	22	1435
29	Mark Gibson	27	31	6	27	29		18																9	19	27	1355
30	Jeff Falk		18	16			30		7			5		22	23		5							26			1310
31	Rick Carelli		4			5				8		**2**			4									40	3		1285
32	Dick Tracey					32	38		36		31	34	26	31	32	21	27	DNQ	25	38				DNQ	DNQ	DNQ	1255
33	Rick Markle	DNQ	12	25	8	13	33	27																	14		1230
34	Jeff Finley			2	3					11											7	4	4				1225
35	Vern Slagh	32		5	22					19					11						26		24			32	1005
36	Kerry Earnhardt	14						20		1*														1*		1*	1005
37	Bobby Gerhart	6								28	6		17			30									**1***		970
38	Chad Blount					9									10				11				2		7		960
39	John Metcalf						9		6					2			24		5								930
40	Chase Montgomery		34				12		29					5			35							6		24	910
41	Bob Strait	2																2	20	24					2		910
42	Damon Lusk							24					12			10	32								16	8	890
43	Randy Van Zant			24	15							6		26				14		20			DNQ				855
44	Marty Butkovich			17	19							23									25	12	16				820
45	Tom Eriksen										8					13		10	30	6							815
46	Jerry Glanville						10	35		4				19	6												790
47	Rick Thoennes							DNQ		17					9				13					32		10	775
48	Roger Blackstock			18						37					19					31		7	11				765
49	Shelby Howard																				6	18	6	21		30	750
50	Tony Altiere					26	35		33					34	29	29	25		29	32						DNQ	735
51	Philip Kranefuss		30				4	25	9													23					705
52	Tracy Leslie			20	18								32			6					22		DNQ				675
53	Robby Benton	15						16																14	6		665
54	Ken Schrader		1																	4	3						655
55	Stanton Barrett		8					4				4															635
56	John Hayden											25						5			16	16					625
57	David Keith	41						5		7	19																625
58	Tim Turner			15	12	19												31		35			DNQ				615
59	Doug Keller					14			17									4		33							605
60	Karla Lampe				10				25					38				20			18					DNQ	605
61	Justin Labonte	34						30									14		QL						17	29	595
62	James Hylton		33	29		33			34	38							33	Wth	39					37		21	585
63	Dicky Williamson	DNQ												21		23	17		18						DNQ		575
64	Michael Melton			23	24				23			DNQ						25		39	34						565
65	Robbie Cowart							10						12										24		25	565
66	Howard Rose													28	18		8		24								530
67	Jason Hedlesky		DNQ					29		25	Wth					33								13		31	520
68	Charlie Schaefer					17	31											12		26							505
69	Mark Hockensmith						24		38	26		26		16													500
70	Jeff Caudell						23							13			22		DNQ		32						495
71	Tim Burrell						22							27				16		21							490
72	C. W. Smith	38									26					11									15		470
73	Dion Ciccarelli	18	38								29					9									40		465
74	Jeep Pflum						19			21				8													450
75	Mike Basham					28			32			32			27					22							445
76	Randal Ritter	DNQ	17														6								32		445
77	Scott Kuhn					15						8												27			440
78	Billy Bigley											1*		7													440
79	Shawna Robinson	7	3																								410
80	Ryan Vos			13	9											36											400
81	Darrell Lanigan						6	6																			400
82	Ryan Newman	1							**20**																		390
83	Josh Richeson							19			2					40											385
84	Bill Eversole						25			31					16							Wth	DNQ				380
85	Mel Walen					24			21										19								370
86	Jerry Hill	19									21					25											365
87	Kevin McGuire									23					35				22					DNQ		DNQ	340
88	Willie Green						5							20													340
89	Eric Smith																	7		19							330
90	Jim Eubanks											DNQ						17		14							330
91	Brent Glastetter																	18		10							320
92	Bob Aiello																							17		12	315
93	Steadman Marlin		13					17																			310
94	Brent Sherman																			28	20		32			34	305
95	Mark Voigt	39				11			27																		305
96	Nate Monteith		23																						11		290
97	Carl McCormick																18							30		33	285
98	J. R. Robbs	29						33																19			285
99	Shawn Gray																					24	12				280
100	Randy Briggs		15						22																		275
101	Dale Kreider	DNQ											8												36		265
102	Eric Smith												DNQ			31			40					20			255
103	Shane Hmiel																							DNQ		2	255
104	Tony Stewart																			**2**							250
105	Kirk Shelmerdine	**4**																									240
106	Mike Harmon	DNQ	10																						41		235
107	John Finger												1														235
108	Lyndon Amick												6*														230
109	Keith Segars	10																							37		225
110	Jim Hollenbeck																				30		22				225
111	Mike Burg																				29		25				215
112	Bill Baird																	DNQ		3	QL						215
113	Ricky Hendrick	9*																									215
114	Phillip Young											22					28										210
115	Andy Kirby																								4		210
116	Art Cross												5														205
117	Ray Clay																						10				205
118	Andy Petree																			9							195
119	Austin Cameron								8																		190
120	Jeriod Prince																				8						190
121	Johnny Sauter																							8			190
122	Jerry Churchill												9														185
123	Casey Mears																								9		185
124	Tina Gordon																								10		185
125	Mike Zazula										28					28											180
126	Todd Shafer	DNQ						28		33																	180
127	Steve Cronenwett																					10					180
128	Frog Hall								11																		175
129	Ronnie Hornaday	11																									175
130	Doug Stevens																									11	175
131	Billy Thomas																	Wth		11							175
132	Brad Baker	12																									170
133	Wayne Peterson												28						36								165
134	Alan Bigelow																			13							165
135	Bill Conger																									13	165
136	John Sadinsky								Wth												35		18				165
137	Ryck Sanders								14																		160
138	Rich Woodland Jr.						14																				160
139	Shane Lewis																									16	150
140	Chris Douglas																						17				145
141	Andy Hillenburg	17																									145
142	Emerson Newton-John																									17	145
143	Scott Ritter										17																145
144	Malcolm Bennett										18																140
145	Jeff Spraker												18														140
146	Brian Zalner												19														135
147	Richard Hampton												20														130
148	Michael Simko																					20					130
149	Jerry Cook			21																							125
150	Mark Green																		21								125
151	Todd Coon																	23									115
152	Dan Pardus	24																									115
153	Tim Edwards											DNQ												28			115
154	Brian Conz																								23		110
155	C. T. Hellmund												24														110
156	Scotty Sands																				24						110
157	Chris Geier																	34		29							110
158	Wayne Hixson													36					35								105
159	Jim Pate														25												105
160	Anthony Hill	DNQ	35					DNQ																			105
161	Sammy Potashnick								26																		100
162	Dennis Strickland																					26					100
163	Tom Baker																					27					95
164	Jeff Streeter	DNQ	32																								95
165	Brad Anderson																					28					90
166	Cavin Councilor		29									13															85
167	Bill Harner												30														80
168	Matt Hummel										30																80
169	Dean Roper																	30									80
170	Johnny Borneman III								31																		75
171	Rick Hixson											31															75
172	Wheeler Boys												34														70
173	John Neal							DNQ									36							DNQ			70
174	Ed Kennedy	33																									65
175	Bob Kelly	DNQ																							38		65
176	Jeff Alsip						34																				60
177	Kevin Gardner																							34			60
178	Chuck Roumell														34												60
179	Jon Herb	35																									55
180	Keith Murt																									35	55
181	Jason Vieau																							35			55
182	Ben Hess	37																									45
183	Tom Sokoloski														37												45
184	Paul Booher							38																			40
185	Brian Kaltreider																							38			40
186	Steve Melnick															39											35
187	Doug Reid III																								39		35
188	Mark Stahl	40																									30
189	Andy Stone	DNQ																									
190	Jimmy Burns	DNQ																									
191	Bill Hoff	DNQ																									
192	David Ray Boggs	DNQ						DNQ																			
193	David Romines	DNQ																							DNQ		
194	Drew White	DNQ																							DNQ		
195	A. J. Alsup		DNQ																								
196	Terry Harris							DNQ																			
197	Stanley Teague											DNQ															
198	Mike Potter															DNQ											
199	Rick Tackman																	DNQ					DNQ				
200	Bill Bray																						DNQ				
201	Ed Wettlaufer																						DNQ				
202	Kieran Dynes																							DNQ			
203	John Kinder																							DNQ			
204	Andy Lombi																									DNQ	
205	Jennifer Jo Cobb								Wth																		
Pos.	Driver	DAY	NSH	WIN	SLM	GTY	KEN	CLT	KAN	MCH	POC	MEM	GLN	KEN	MCH	POC	NSH	ISF	CHI	DSF	SLM	TOL	BLN	CLT	TAL	ATL	Points

== See also ==
- 2001 NASCAR Winston Cup Series
- 2001 NASCAR Busch Series
- 2001 NASCAR Craftsman Truck Series
- 2001 NASCAR Goody's Dash Series
