= 2002 ARCA Re/Max Series =

American stock car series

2002 ARCA RE/MAX Series

Seasons
- ← 2001 2003 →

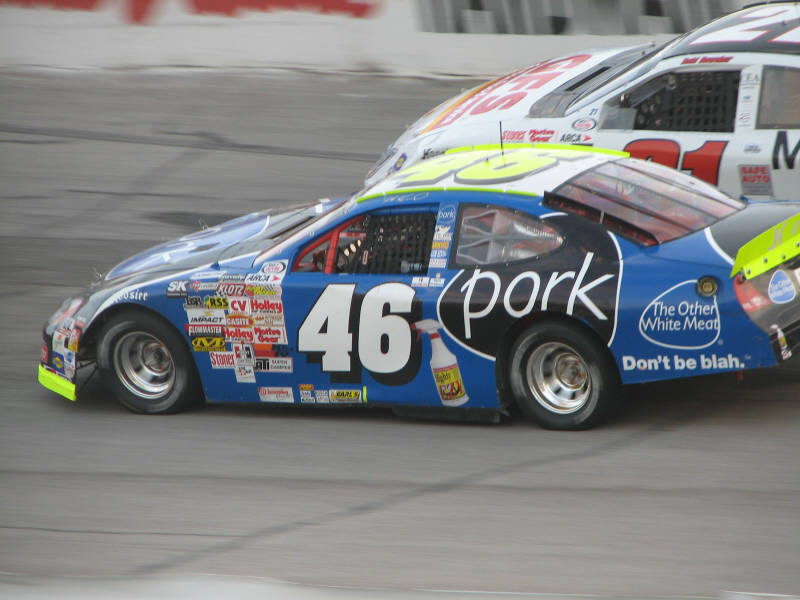
Frank Kimmel, driving the No. 46 car for Clement Racing (pictured in 2006), the 2002 ARCA champion. This was the fourth of his 10 championships in the series and third of 8 straight.

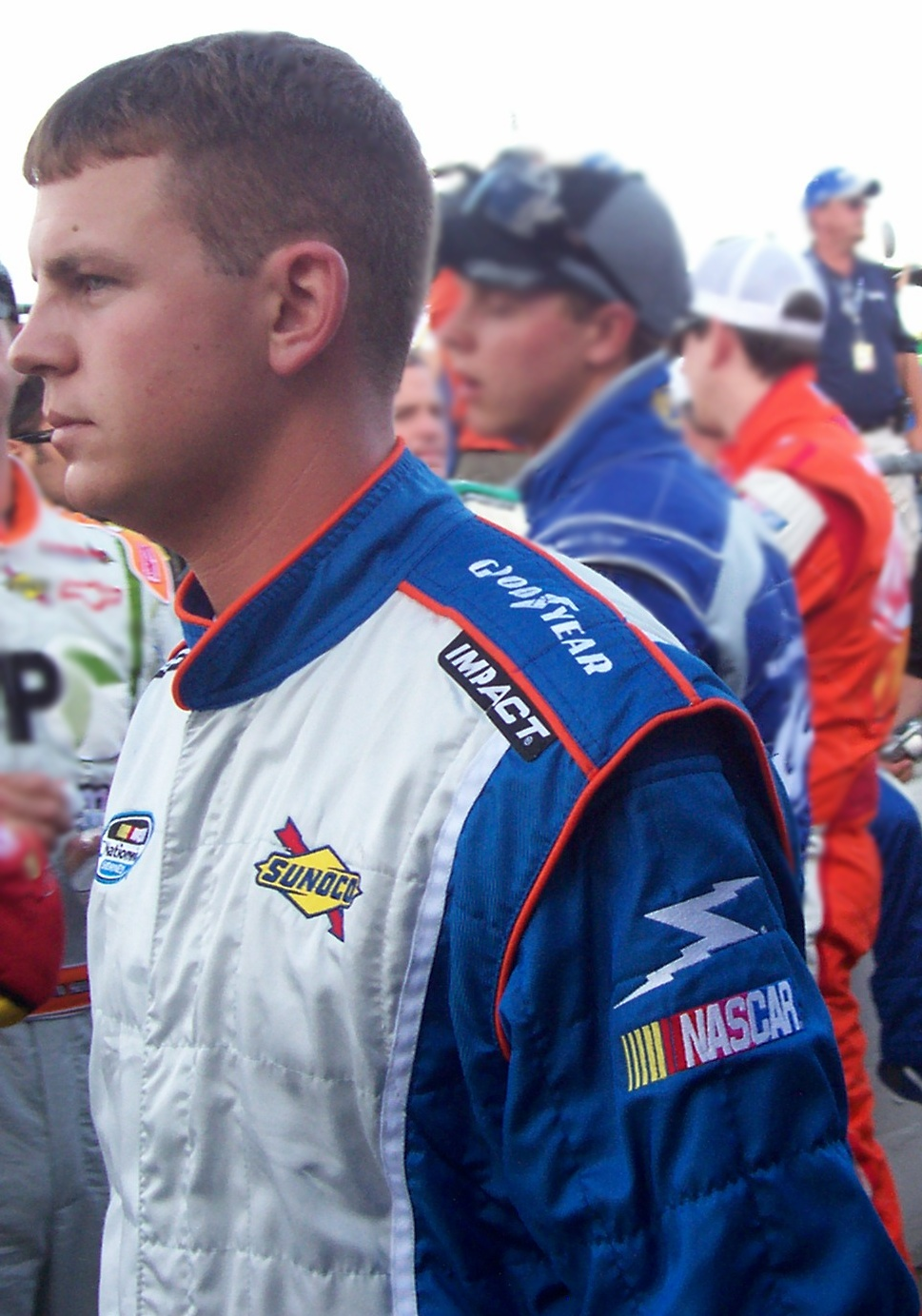
Chad Blount finished second behind Kimmel in the championship standings and also won Rookie of the Year.

The 2002 ARCA Re/Max Series was the 50th season of the ARCA Racing Series, a division of the Automobile Racing Club of America (ARCA). The season began on February 10, 2002, with the ARCA 200 at Daytona International Speedway. The season ended with the EasyCare Vehicle Services Contract 200 at Lowe's Motor Speedway on October 11. Frank Kimmel won the drivers championship, his fourth in the series and third in a row, and Chad Blount won the Rookie of the Year award.

== Schedule & Winners ==
| Date | Track | City | Event name | Pole winner | Race winner |
|---|---|---|---|---|---|
| February 10 | Daytona International Speedway | Daytona Beach, Florida | Discount Auto Parts 200 | Chase Montgomery | Bobby Gerhart |
| March 9 | Atlanta Motor Speedway | Hampton, Georgia | Pork The Other White Meat 400 | Chad Blount | Damon Lusk |
| April 12 | Nashville Superspeedway | Lebanon, Tennessee | PFG Lester 150 | Frank Kimmel | Frank Kimmel |
| April 29 | Salem Speedway | Washington Township, Indiana | Kentuckiana Ford Dealers 200 | Frank Kimmel | Frank Kimmel |
| May 11 | Kentucky Speedway | Sparta, Kentucky | WLWT Channel 5 155 | John Metcalf | Frank Kimmel |
| May 18 | Lowe's Motor Speedway | Concord, North Carolina | EasyCare Vehicle Service Contracts 100 | Frank Kimmel | Jeff Fultz |
| June 1 | Kansas Speedway | Kansas City, Kansas | BPU 200 | Frank Kimmel | Frank Kimmel |
| June 8 | Pocono Raceway | Long Pond, Pennsylvania | Pocono ARCA 200 | Frank Kimmel | Damon Lusk |
| June 15 | Michigan Speedway | Brooklyn, Michigan | Flagstar 200 | Chad Blount | Chad Blount |
| June 23 | Toledo Speedway | Toledo, Ohio | Jasper Engines & Transmissions 200 | Chad Blount | Frank Kimmel |
| July 3 | South Boston Speedway | South Boston, Virginia | Big Daddy's Liberty 200 | Ken Schrader | Ken Schrader |
| July 12 | Kentucky Speedway | Sparta, Kentucky | Bluegrass Quality Meats 200 | Vern Slagh | Chad Blount |
| July 20 | Berlin Raceway | Marne, Michigan | Pork, The Other White Meat 200 | Chad Blount | Fred Campbell |
| July 27 | Pocono Raceway | Long Pond, Pennsylvania | Pepsi ARCA 200 | Casey Atwood | Casey Atwood |
| August 9 | Nashville Superspeedway | Lebanon, Tennessee | Waste Management 200 | Frank Kimmel | Frank Kimmel |
| August 18 | Illinois State Fairgrounds | Springfield, Illinois | Allen Crowe Memorial 100 | Frank Kimmel | Frank Kimmel |
| August 31 | Winchester Speedway | White River Township, Indiana | GoldenPalace200.com 200 | Frank Kimmel | Frank Kimmel |
| September 2 | DuQuoin State Fairgrounds | Du Quoin, Illinois | Federated Auto Parts 100 | Tony Stewart | Frank Kimmel |
| September 7 | Chicagoland Speedway | Joliet, Illinois | ReadyHosting.com 200 | Chad Blount | Chad Blount |
| September 15 | Salem Speedway | Washington Township, Indiana | Eddie Gilstrap Motors 200 | Frank Kimmel | Frank Kimmel |
| October 5 | Talladega Superspeedway | Lincoln, Alabama | Food World 300 | Bobby Gerhart | Keith Segars |
| October 11 | Lowe's Motor Speedway | Concord, North Carolina | EasyCare Vehicle Service Contracts 100 | Frank Kimmel | Chad Blount |

=== Drivers' championship ===
(key) Bold – Pole position awarded by time. Italics – Pole position set by final practice results or rainout. * – Most laps led. ** – All laps led.

| Pos. | Driver | Races | | | | | | | | | | | | | | | | | | | | | | Points |
| Pos. | Driver | DAY | ATL | NSH | SLM | KEN | CLT | KAN | POC | MCH | TOL | SBO | KEN | BER | POC | NSH | ISF | WIN | DQN | CHI | SLM | TAL | CLT | Points |
|---|---|---|---|---|---|---|---|---|---|---|---|---|---|---|---|---|---|---|---|---|---|---|---|---|
| 1 | Frank Kimmel | 3 | 35* | **1*** | 1* | 1* | **2*** | **1*** | 9* | 32 | 1 | 2 | 2* | 3 | 13 | **1*** | 1* | **1*** | 1* | 3 | **1** | 3 | 3 | 6175 |
| 2 | Chad Blount | 4 | **2** | 6 | 28 | 2 | 6 | 4 | 15 | **1*** | **18** | 22 | 1 | **2*** | 14 | 22 | 8 | 17 | 25 | **1*** | 3 | 2 | 1* | 5675 |
| 3 | Jason Jarrett | 18 | 5 | 37 | 2 | 13 | 8 | 23 | 2 | 33 | 2 | 6 | 4 | 10 | 2 | 29 | 10 | 20 | 8 | 5 | 14 | 5 | 6 | 5160 |
| 4 | Chase Montgomery | **21** | 34 | 5 | 18 | 11 | 7 | 12 | 8 | 10 | 22 | 5 | 29 | 6 | 8 | 3 | 11 | 22 | 32 | 6 | 4 | 27 | 25 | 4755 |
| 5 | Shelby Howard | 27 | 9 | 9 | 21 | 8 | 19 | 7 | 19 | 30 | 11 | 13 | 9 | 12 | 5 | 12 | 20 | 2 | 10 | 40 | 5 | 13 | 19 | 4745 |
| 6 | Billy Venturini | 29 | 7 | 26 | 20 | 10 | 31 | 11 | 6 | 19 | 7 | 3 | 12 | 11 | 25 | 8 | 9 | 24 | 13 | 8 | 26 | 10 | 22 | 4685 |
| 7 | Andy Belmont | 36 | 6 | 31 | 3* | 5 | 10 | 5 | 7 | 13 | 29 | 7 | 26 | 15 | 29 | 26 | 14 | 19 | 34 | 25 | 2* | 15 | 13 | 4520 |
| 8 | Mark Gibson | 16 | 38 | 12 | 15 | 7 | 11 | 6 | 10 | 34 | 25 | 15 | 5 | 5 | 16 | 32 | 29 | 4 | 36 | 7 | 11 | 7 | 31 | 4455 |
| 9 | Ron Cox | 24 | 12 | 10 | 22 | 31 | 23 | 26 | 4 | 29 | 28 | 8 | 14 | 7 | 12 | 6 | 19 | 7 | 26 | 10 | 8 | 16 | Wth | 4405 |
| 10 | Norm Benning | 33 | 25 | 18 | 10 | 14 | 22 | 14 | 14 | 23 | 12 | 20 | 22 | 19 | 30 | 20 | 6 | 9 | 21 | 16 | 21 | 21 | 26 | 4230 |
| 11 | Kevin Belmont | 35 | 24 | 25 | 14 | 17 | 25 | 9 | 11 | 21 | 27 | 11 | 19 | 17 | 18 | 9 | 7 | 29 | 9 | 33 | 19 | 19 | 20 | 4225 |
| 12 | Todd Bowsher | 14 | 21 | 17 | 6 | 28 | 29 | 15 | 21 | 27 | 10 | 30 | 39 | 8 | 20 | 17 | 28 | 8 | 16 | 28 | 23 | 37 | 30 | 3950 |
| 13 | Mike Buckley | 11 | 22 | 30 | 9 | 21 | 17 | 31 | 32 | 26 | 26 | 21 | 30 | 26 | 40 | 27 | 38 | 6 | 20 | 11 | 15 | 28 | 27 | 3740 |
| 14 | Chuck Weber | 37 | 16 | 13 | 26 | 22 | 24 | 33 | 12 | 22 | 19 | 16 | 34 | 20 | 32 | 24 | 27 | 13 | 17 | 20 | 33 | 41 | 34 | 3640 |
| 15 | Darrell Basham | 41 | 14 | 27 | 31 | 20 | 28 | 27 | 24 | 25 | 13 | 14 | 35 | 21 | 21 | 28 | 34 | 18 | 40 | 14 | 22 | 20 | 33 | 3565 |
| 16 | Brad Smith | DNQ | 40 | DNQ | 27 | 27 | 30 | 19 | 23 | 28 | 33 | 28 | 24 | 23 | 23 | 21 | 18 | 12 | 31 | 19 | 29 | 38 | 32 | 3275 |
| 17 | Greg Sarff | 32 | 37 | 16 | 34 | 30 | DNQ | 17 | 34 | 24 | 14 | 24 | 15 | 31 | 35 | 13 | 35 | 33 | 38 | 13 | 25 | 24 | 35 | 3175 |
| 18 | Tim Mitchell | DNQ | 31 | 36 | 33 | QL | DNQ | 18 | 20 | DNQ | 24 | 18 | DNQ | 22 | 19 | 25 | 24 | 16 | 22 | 35 | 28 | DNQ | | 3020 |
| 19 | Eric Martin | DNQ | DNQ | 23 | 30 | 26 | 40 | 21 | 25 | 31 | 35 | 26 | 37 | 28 | 33 | 31 | 23 | 32 | 14 | 18 | 27 | DNQ | Wth | 2990 |
| 20 | Damon Lusk | 5 | 1 | 7 | 8 | 9 | 3 | 3 | 1 | 2 | 9* | 19 | | | | | | | | | | | | 2765 |
| 21 | Michael Vergers | 39 | 4 | 34 | 12 | 6 | 14 | | 30 | 5 | | | | | | | | | | | | 8 | 37 | 1895 |
| 22 | Brent Sherman | DNQ | 23 | 28 | | 25 | 20 | DNQ | | 11 | | | 11 | | 6 | 4 | | | | 31 | | | 9 | 1515 |
| 23 | Robert Burroughs | 10 | 29 | 21 | 13 | | 9 | | | | | | | | 24 | 2 | | | | | | 30 | 36 | 1475 |
| 24 | Richard Mitchell | 7 | | | | | 5 | | | 3 | | | | | 27 | | | | | | | 6 | 10 | 1340 |
| 25 | A. J. Henriksen | | | | 7 | 32 | | | | 4 | 5 | 10 | 13 | | 34 | | | 30 | | 27 | | 39 | | 1310 |
| 26 | Randy Van Zant | | | | 4 | 36 | | | | | 31 | 9 | 21 | 9 | | | 15 | 5 | | | 34 | | | 1250 |
| 27 | Bobby Gerhart | 1* | | | | | | | 5 | 7 | | 4 | | | 4 | | | | | | | **26** | | 1195 |
| 28 | Deborah Renshaw | | | | | | | | | | | | 8 | | 11 | 7 | | | | 9 | | 11 | Wth | 1195 |
| 29 | Sean Stafford | | | | | | | | 13 | 15 | | | 20 | | 17 | | | | | | | 31 | 18 | 1060 |
| 30 | Rick Carelli | 2 | | | | | | 38 | 3 | 36 | | | | | | | | | | 2 | | 4 | | 975 |
| 31 | Jerry Glanville | | | 4 | | 19 | 18 | 37 | | 35 | | | 6 | | | 10 | | | | | | | | 965 |
| 32 | Jason Rudd | | | 8 | | 3 | | 29 | | | | | | | 9 | 18 | | | | | | | 24 | 925 |
| 33 | Jeff Caudell | | | 19 | 11 | 40 | | | | | DNQ | | 23 | | | 15 | | | | 26 | 16 | | | 885 |
| 34 | Robby Benton | 34 | | | | | 4 | | | | | | | | | | | | | | | 9 | 17 | 850 |
| 35 | Keith Murt | | 11 | 15 | | 33 | | | | 16 | | | 36 | | | 23 | | | | 39 | | 32 | | 810 |
| 36 | Doug Stevens | | 10 | | | | | | | | | 12 | | | | | | 3 | | | 9 | | | 755 |
| 37 | Christi Passmore | | | | 19 | 41 | | 25 | | | 23 | | | 24 | 37 | | | 27 | | 23 | | | | 750 |
| 38 | John Metcalf | | | 33 | | **4** | | | | | | | 7 | | | 5 | | | | | | | | 700 |
| 39 | Marty Butkovich | | | | 25 | | | | | 38 | | | | 16 | | | | 15 | | | 32 | | 28 | 690 |
| 40 | Tom Eriksen | | | | | | | | 29 | | | | | | 7 | | 5 | | 7 | | | | | 680 |
| 41 | Chris Moore | | | | | | | | | | 3 | | | 4 | | | | | | | | | 4 | 645 |
| 42 | Dicky Williamson | DNQ | 19 | 20 | | | 26 | | | | | | | | | 19 | | | | | | 23 | | 640 |
| 43 | Bob Strait | | | | | | | | | | | | | | | | 3 | | 27 | 21 | | | 5 | 640 |
| 44 | Wally Fowler | | 15 | Wth | | | 13 | | 17 | | | | | | Wth | | | | | | | | 15 | 620 |
| 45 | Vern Slagh | 22 | | Wth | | 34 | | | | 14 | 8 | | **40** | | | | | | | | | DNQ | | 615 |
| 46 | John Hayden | | | 3 | 29 | 35 | 34 | | | | 17 | | 38 | | | | | | | | | | | 600 |
| 47 | Michael Simko | | | | | | | | | | 6 | | | | | | | 14 | | | 6 | | | 585 |
| 48 | Scotty Sands | | | Wth | | DNQ | | | | | 15 | | | | | | 16 | 11 | | | 31 | | | 580 |
| 49 | Joe Cooksey | 13 | | | | | | | | | | | | | | | 4 | | 5 | | | | | 580 |
| 50 | Steve Senerchia | DNQ | DNQ | DNQ | | DNQ | | | 27 | | | | | | 26 | | | | | | | | | 570 |
| 51 | Dan Shaver | 20 | DNQ | | | | 21 | 28 | 38 | 9 | | | | | | | | | | | | | | 555 |
| 52 | Bob Aiello | | 27 | | | | DNQ | 20 | | | | | 17 | | | | | | | 17 | | | 29 | 540 |
| 53 | Red Farmer | | | | | | | | | | 34 | 23 | | 32 | | | 32 | | 4 | | | | | 540 |
| 54 | Brian Conz | | | | | | | | | 20 | DNQ | | 28 | | | | | | | 12 | | 22 | | 535 |
| 55 | Rick Thonnes | | 17 | 11 | | | | | | 8 | | | | | | DNQ | | | | | | | | 535 |
| 56 | Tina Gordon | 26 | 8 | | | | 35 | | | | | | | | | | | | | | | 12 | | 515 |
| 57 | Eric Smith | | | | | | | | 16 | | | | | | 15 | | | | | 29 | | | 21 | 515 |
| 58 | Kevin Gardner | | | | | | 12 | | | | | | | | | | | | | | | 35 | DNQ | 500 |
| 59 | Tim Turner | | 30 | 39 | 32 | DNQ | | 35 | | | | | | | | 35 | 40 | DNQ | 39 | | 35 | | 39 | 495 |
| 60 | Frank Kapfhammer | | | | | 29 | | | | | | | 25 | | | 16 | | | | | 20 | | | 495 |
| 61 | Ken Schrader | | | | | | | | | | | **1*** | | | | | | | 3 | | | | | 485 |
| 62 | Justin Allgaier | | | | | | | | | | | | | | | | 17 | | 11 | | 17 | | | 465 |
| 63 | Mike Zazula | | DNQ | 29 | | 37 | 39 | | 22 | | | | | | 22 | 40 | | | | | | | | 460 |
| 64 | Fred Campbell | | | | | | | | | | 4 | | | 1* | | | | | | | | | | 460 |
| 65 | John Sadinsky | | | | | | | | | | DNQ | | | 18 | 31 | | | 10 | | | | | | 445 |
| 66 | Doug Keller | | | | | | | | | | | | | | | | 2 | | 6 | | | | | 445 |
| 67 | Dennis English | | | 24 | | | | 36 | | | DNQ | 25 | DNQ | | | 34 | 33 | | | | | | | 440 |
| 68 | C. W. Smith | 25 | | | | | | | 28 | | | | | | 10 | | | | | | | 33 | | 440 |
| 69 | Matt Hagans | | | | 5 | | | | | 6 | | | | | | | | DNQ | | | | | | 435 |
| 70 | Tim Steele | | 32 | Wth | | 38 | | | | 12 | | | | 29 | | | | | | | | | 40 | 430 |
| 71 | Jeep Pfulm | | | | | 18 | | | | | | | 16 | | | | | | | | 18 | | | 430 |
| 72 | Robbie Cowart | | 36 | | | | 36 | | | | | | | | | 11 | | | | | | | 16 | 425 |
| 73 | Jeff Fultz | | | | | | 1 | | | | | | | | | | | | | | | | 8 | 425 |
| 74 | Jeremy Clements | | | | | | | | | | | | | | | | | | | | | 17 | DNQ | 420 |
| 75 | Jerry Middleton | | | | | | | | | | | | | | | | | 34 | | 37 | | DNQ | 41 | 410 |
| 76 | Randal Ritter | 17 | | 41 | | | | | | | | | | | | 30 | | | | | | 18 | | 395 |
| 77 | Neil McClelland | | | | 17 | 23 | | | | | 21 | | | | | | | | | | | | | 385 |
| 78 | Wayman Wittman | | | | | | 27 | | 18 | 18 | | | | | | | | | | | | | | 375 |
| 79 | Eric Nale | | | | 24 | | | | | | 32 | | | | | | | | | | 12 | | | 370 |
| 80 | Jamie Mosley | | | | | | | | | | | | 18 | | | | | | | 24 | | | 23 | 365 |
| 81 | Kevin Conway | | 13 | | | | | | | | | | | | | | | | | | | | 7 | 365 |
| 82 | Tim Burrell | | | | 23 | | | | | | | | | | | | 31 | | 12 | | | | | 360 |
| 83 | Justin Labonte | 9 | 28 | | | | 32 | | | | | | | | | | | | | | | | | 355 |
| 84 | Willie Green | | | | | 12 | | | | | | | 10 | | | | | | | | | | | 355 |
| 85 | Austin Cameron | | | | | | | 22 | | | | | 3 | | | | | | | | | | | 355 |
| 86 | Justin Ashburn | | | 38 | | 16 | | | | | | | | | | 14 | | | | | | | | 350 |
| 87 | Andy Hillenburg | 6 | 18 | | | | | | | | | | | | | | | | | | | | | 340 |
| 88 | Mel Walen | | | | | | | 10 | | | | | | | | | | | | 22 | | DNQ | | 330 |
| 89 | James Hylton | | | | | | | | 35 | 41 | | 31 | | 34 | 36 | 36 | | | | 36 | DNQ | | | 320 |
| 90 | Carl McCormick | 15 | | | | | | | | | | | | | | | | | | | | | 14 | 315 |
| 91 | Greg Van Alst | | | | | | | | | | Wth | | 32 | | | | | DNQ | | 15 | 30 | | | 305 |
| 92 | Karla Lampa | | | | 16 | | | 30 | | | | | | | | | | DNQ | 37 | | | | | 300 |
| 93 | Jason Hedlesky | | | | | | 15 | | | 17 | | | | | | | | | | | | | | 300 |
| 94 | Mike Langston | | | | | | | | | | | | | | | | | 25 | | | 7 | | | 300 |
| 95 | Keith Segars | 40 | | | | | | | | | | | | | | | | | | | | 1* | | 300 |
| 96 | Todd Coon | | | | | | | | | | | | | | | | 12 | | 23 | | | | | 285 |
| 97 | Cam Strader | | 3 | 32 | | | | | | | | | | | | | | | | | | | | 285 |
| 98 | Todd Antrican | DNQ | DNQ | 35 | | 39 | 41 | | | 37 | DNQ | | | | | | 36 | | 35 | | | | | 265 |
| 99 | Shanta Rhodes | | | | | | | | | | | | | | | | | 26 | | | 13 | | | 265 |
| 100 | Randy Ainsworth | | | | | | | 32 | | | | 27 | DNQ | | 41 | 37 | | | | | | | | 260 |
| 101 | Casey Atwood | | | | | | | | | | | | | | **1*** | | | | | | | | | 260 |
| 102 | Chris Geier | | | | | | | | | | | | | | | | 26 | | 15 | | | | | 255 |
| 103 | Brian Winters | | | | | | | | | | | | | | | | | 23 | 19 | | | | | 250 |
| 104 | Tony Stewart | | | | | | | | | | | | | | | | | | **2** | | | | | 250 |
| 105 | Eric Smith | | | | | | | | | | | | | | | | 13 | | 30 | | | | | 245 |
| 106 | Stuart Kirby | | | | | | | 2 | | | | | | | | | | | | | | | | 245 |
| 107 | Sammy Ragan | | | 2 | | | | | | | | | | | | | | | | | | | | 240 |
| 108 | Tony Ave | | | | | | | | | | | | | | | | | | | 4 | | | | 225 |
| 109 | Ron Hornaday Jr. | | | | | | | | | | | | | | | | | | | | | | 2 | 225 |
| 110 | Mike Burg | | | | | 15 | | | | | | | 33 | | | | | | | | | | | 220 |
| 111 | Mario Gosselin | | | | | | | | | | | | | | 3 | | | | | | | | | 220 |
| 112 | Billy Thomas | | | | | | | | | | | | | | | | 22 | | 29 | | | | | 210 |
| 113 | Kevin McGuire | DNQ | 26 | | | DNQ | | | | | | | | | | | | | | 30 | | | | 205 |
| 114 | Jerry Coble | | | | | | | | | | | | | | | | | | | | 10 | | | 205 |
| 115 | Rich Woodland Jr. | 12 | | | | | | | | | | | | | | | | | | | | 40 | | 200 |
| 116 | Jon Morley | | | | | | | | | | | | | | | | | | | 38 | | | | 200 |
| 117 | Larry Hollenbeck | | 20 | | | | 38 | | | | | | | | | | | | | | | DNQ | | 195 |
| 118 | Mike Duncan | | | | | | | 8 | | | | | | | | | | | | | | | | 190 |
| 119 | Nate Monteith | 8 | | | | | | | | | | | | | | | | | | | | | | 190 |
| 120 | Shawn Gray | | | | | | | | | | DNQ | | | 27 | | 33 | | | | | | | | 185 |
| 121 | Jason Vieau | | | | | | | | | | | | | | | | | | | | | | 11 | 175 |
| 122 | Bob Hill | | | | | | | | | | | | | | | | 30 | | 28 | | | | | 170 |
| 123 | Kyle Busch | | | | | | | | | | | | | | | | | | | | | | 12 | 170 |
| 124 | Sunny Hobbs | 31 | 33 | | | | DNQ | | | | | | | | | | | | | | | | | 165 |
| 125 | Ray Clay | | | | | | | | | | | | | 13 | | | | | | | | | | 165 |
| 126 | Clint Vahsholtz | | | | | | | 13 | | | | | | | | | | | | | | | | 165 |
| 127 | Dustin Maherg | | | 14 | | | | | | | | | 27 | | | | | | | | | | | 160 |
| 128 | Kasey Kahne | | | | | | | | | | | | | | | | | | | | | 14 | | 160 |
| 129 | Dave Weltmeyer | | | | | | | | | | | | | 14 | | | | | | | | | | 160 |
| 130 | Jennifer Jo Cobb | | | | | | | 16 | | | | | | | | | | | | | | | | 150 |
| 131 | Jeff Finley | | | | | | | | | | 16 | | | | | | | | | | | | | 150 |
| 132 | Richard King | | | | | | 16 | | | | | | | | | | | | | | | | DNQ | 150 |
| 133 | Claude Plante | | | | | | | | | | DNQ | | | | | | | 21 | | | | | | 150 |
| 134 | Charlie Schaefer | | | | | | | | | | | | | | | | 21 | | DNQ | | | | | 150 |
| 135 | Brack Maggard | | | | | | | | | | | 17 | | | | | | | | | | | | 145 |
| 136 | Mark Schulz | | | 22 | | | | DNQ | | | | | | | | | | | | | | | | 145 |
| 137 | Jimmy Edlin | | | 40 | | 24 | | | | | | | | | | | | | | | | | | 140 |
| 138 | Bill Baird | Wth | | | | | | | | | | | | | | | | | 18 | | | | | 140 |
| 139 | Jerry Hill | 19 | | | | | | | | | | | | | | | | | | | | | | 135 |
| 140 | Rusty Morgan | | | | | | | | | | | | | | | | | | | | 24 | | DNQ | 135 |
| 141 | Tom Buzze | | | | | | | | | | 20 | | | | | | | | | | | | | 130 |
| 142 | Jim Eubanks | | | | | | | | | | | | | | | | 25 | | DNQ | | | | | 130 |
| 143 | Mike Basham | | | | | | | 34 | | DNQ | | | | | | 38 | | | | | | | | 125 |
| 144 | Adam Roberts | | | | | | | | | | | | | | | | 37 | DNQ | DNQ | | | | DNQ | 120 |
| 145 | Todd Shafer | DNQ | | | | | | | | Wth | | | | | 28 | | | | | | | | | 115 |
| 146 | David Elliott | DNQ | 39 | | | | | | | | | | | | | | | | | | | 36 | | 110 |
| 147 | Troy Backlund | | | | | | | 24 | | | | | | | | | | | | | | | | 110 |
| 148 | Alton McBride Jr. | | | | | | | | | | | | | | | | | | 24 | | | | | 110 |
| 149 | Ryan Vos | | | | | | | | 31 | 40 | | | | | | | | | | | | | | 105 |
| 150 | Bobby Bowsher | | | | | | | | | | | | | | | | | | | | | 25 | | 105 |
| 151 | Billy Shotko | | | | | | | | | | | | | 25 | | | | | | | | | | 105 |
| 152 | Ed Wettlaufer | | | | | | | | | | | | | 30 | | | 39 | | | | | | | 105 |
| 153 | John Mazzuchelli | | | | | | | | 26 | | | | | | | | | | | | | | | 100 |
| 154 | Dick Tracey | DNQ | | Wth | | | | | | | | | | | | 39 | | Wth | | 34 | | | | 95 |
| 155 | Mark Cash | | | | | | | | | | | 29 | | | | | | | | | | | | 95 |
| 156 | Tony Altiere | DNQ | | Wth | | | | | | | | | | | | DNQ | | | | 32 | | DNQ | | 95 |
| 157 | Mike Harmon | 28 | | | | | | | | | | | | | | | | | | | | 29 | | 90 |
| 158 | Tim Fulford | | | | | | | | | | | | | | | | Wth | 28 | | | | | | 90 |
| 159 | Casey Mears | 30 | | | | | | | | | | | | | | | | | | | | | | 80 |
| 160 | Brett Oakley | | | | | | | | | | | | | | | | | 31 | | | | | | 75 |
| 161 | Guillermo Ortelli | | | | | | | | | | | | 31 | | | | | | | | | | | 75 |
| 162 | Craig Bracken | | | | | | | | | | | | | 33 | | | | | | | | | | 65 |
| 163 | Doug Ehret | | | | | | | | 33 | | | | | | | | | | | | | | | 65 |
| 164 | Andy Lombi | | | | | | 33 | | | | | | | | | | | | | | | | | 65 |
| 165 | Andy Petree | | | | | | | | | | | | | | | | | | 33 | | | | | 65 |
| 166 | Jeff Spraker | 38 | | | | | | | | | | | | | | | | | | | | DNQ | | 65 |
| 167 | Dave Davis | | | | | | | | | | | | | | | | | | | | | 34 | | 60 |
| 168 | Bill Eversole | | | DNQ | | | | | | 39 | | | | | | | | | | | | | | 60 |
| 169 | Allen Patterson | | | | | | | | | | | | | | 39 | | | | | | DNQ | | | 60 |
| 170 | Paul Booher | | | | | | | | 36 | | | | | | | | | | | | | | | 50 |
| 171 | Jason Hawley | | | | | | | | 37 | | | | | | | | | | | | | | | 45 |
| 172 | Johnny Borneman III | | | | | | 37 | | | | | | | | | | | | | | | | | 45 |
| 173 | Ron Courtney | | | | | | | | | | | | | | 38 | | | | | | | | | 40 |
| 174 | Jim Pate | | | | | | | | | Wth | | | | | | | | | | | | | 38 | 40 |
| 175 | G. J. Mennen Jr. | 23 | | | | | | | | | | | | | | | | | | | | | | |
| 176 | Darrel Krentz | | | | | | | | | | 30 | | | | | | | | | | | | | |
| 177 | Bob Kelly | DNQ | | | | | | | | | | | | | | | | | | | | | | |
| 178 | Tim Edwards | DNQ | | | | | | | | | | | | | | | | | | | | | | |
| 179 | Wayne Peterson | DNQ | | | | | | | | | | | | | | | | | | | | | | |
| 180 | Rick Markle | DNQ | | | | | | | | | | | | | | | | | | | | | | |
| 181 | Frog Hall | DNQ | | | | | | | | | | | | | | | | | | | | | | |
| 182 | David Romines | DNQ | | | | | | | | | | | | | | | | | | | | DNQ | | |
| 183 | Ryck Sanders | | | | | | | DNQ | | | | | | | | | | | | | | | | |
| 184 | Sammy Potashnick | | | | | | | DNQ | | | | | | | | | | | | | | | | |
| 185 | Tom Baker | | | | | | | | | | DNQ | | | | | | | | | | | | | |
| 186 | Mark Hockensmith | | | | | | | | | | | | DNQ | | | | | | DNQ | | | | | |
| 187 | John Neal | | | | | | | | | | | | DNQ | | | | | | | | | | DNQ | |
| 188 | Bruce Bechtel | | | | | | | | | | | | | | | | | | | | | DNQ | | |
| 189 | Scott Kuhn | | | | | | | | | | | | | | | | | | | | | | DNQ | |
| 190 | Johnny Sauter | | | Wth | | | | | | | | | | | | | | | | | | | | |
| 191 | Bill Flowers | | | QL | | | | | | | | | | | | | | | | | | | | |
| Pos. | Driver | DAY | ATL | NSH | SLM | KEN | CLT | KAN | POC | MCH | TOL | SBO | KEN | BER | POC | NSH | ISF | WIN | DQN | CHI | SLM | TAL | CLT | Points |

== See also ==
- 2002 NASCAR Winston Cup Series
- 2002 NASCAR Busch Series
- 2002 NASCAR Craftsman Truck Series
- 2002 NASCAR Goody's Dash Series
