= Greg Sarff =

American racing driver (born 1965)

- Born: September 27, 1965 (age 61); Columbus, Ohio, U.S.

ARCA Menards Series career
- 68 races run over 9 years
- Best finish: 13th (2001)
- First race: 1997 Reese's 400 (Atlanta)
- Last race: 2010 Rattlesnake 150 (Texas)
Wins	Top tens	Poles
0	3	0
- Statistics up to date as of March 27, 2024.

Greg Sarff (born September 27, 1965) is an American former professional stock car racing driver and team owner who has previously competed in the ARCA Racing Series. He is a former winner of the Silver State Classic Challenge 2022 & 2023, having achieved a top speed of 249 mph and an overall average speed of 197 mph over the 90 mile course.

== Racing career ==
In 1997, Sarff made his debut in the 1997 at Atlanta Motor Speedway, driving the No. 48 Pontiac for his own team, Capital City Motorsports, where he started in 32nd but finished in 39th due to a crash early in the race. Sarff then made four starts for James Hylton Motorsports in 1998, driving the No. 44 Buick, where he earned a best finish of eighteenth at Shady Bowl Speedway, and would make sporadic starts for his own team and for Hylton from 1999 to 2000.

In 2001, Sarff ran all but five races held that year, driving a variety of entries fielded by his own team, Hylton, Norm Benning Racing, Del Markle, Mark Gibson Racing, and Cunningham Motorsports, getting two top ten finishes with a best result of ninth at Nashville Superspeedway on his way to finish thirteenth in the final points standings. He then attempted the full 2002 schedule, only failing to qualify for the event at Lowe's Motor Speedway. Throughout the year, he earned six top twenty finishes with a best finish of thirteenth at Nashville, and finished seventeenth in the final points standings.

In 2003, Sarff only ran three races, finishing in the top-twenty four times and earned a best finish of tenth in his final start of the year at Talladega Superspeedway, For the following year, Sarff announced that the team acquired sponsorship from Quaker Steak and Lube for the 2004 season, although he only made three starts with his own team. He also attempted two more races that year, one for Mark Gibson Racing at South Boston Speedway, where he finished 28th due to transmission issues, and the other for Wayne Peterson Racing at Gateway International Raceway, where he failed to qualify.

After not racing in the series from 2005 to 2009, Sarff announced that he would attempt to qualify for the season opening race at Daytona International Speedway, driving his self-owned No. 38 Dodge, although he ultimately failed to qualify for the race. He stated that the Daytona event would be the only race he would attempt, as he would hand the driving duties of No. 38 to Alex Kennedy, although he did drive the No. 28 Chevrolet for Hixson Motorsports at Texas Motor Speedway, where he started seventeenth but finished 32nd after running only seventeen laps due to rear end issues. The Texas event is his most recent event as a driver, as he has not raced in the series since then.

== Motorsports results ==
=== ARCA Racing Series ===
(key) (Bold – Pole position awarded by qualifying time. Italics – Pole position earned by points standings or practice time. * – Most laps led.)

ARCA Racing Series results
Year	Team	No.	Make	1	2	3	4	5	6	7	8	9	10	11	12	13	14	15	16	17	18	19	20	21	22	23	24	25	ARSC	Pts	Ref
1997	Capital City Motorsports	48	Pontiac	DAY	ATL	SLM	CLT	CLT	POC	MCH	SBS	TOL	KIL	FRS	MIN	POC	MCH	DSF	GTW	SLM	WIN	CLT	TAL	ISF	ATL; 39				N/A	0	
1998	James Hylton Motorsports	44	Buick	DAY	ATL	SLM	CLT	MEM; 21	MCH	POC	SBS; 18	TOL; 29	PPR	POC	KIL; 25	FRS	ISF	ATL	DSF	SLM	TEX	WIN	CLT	TAL	ATL				N/A	0	
1998	N/A	70	Buick												KIL; DNQ														N/A	0	
1999	Capital City Motorsports	87	Ford	DAY	ATL	SLM; DNQ	AND; DNQ	CLT	MCH; DNQ	POC	TOL																		51st	545	
1999	Deana Voigt	30	Ford									SBS; 26	BLN	POC	KIL; 24	FRS; 22	FLM	ISF											51st	545	
1999	James Hylton Motorsports	48	Chevy																WIN; 13	DSF	SLM	CLT	TAL	ATL					51st	545	
2000	Capital City Motorsports	38	Ford	DAY	SLM; DNQ	AND; 12	CLT	KIL; 22	FRS; 22	MCH; DNQ	POC	TOL; 26	KEN	BLN	POC	WIN	ISF	KEN; 24	DSF	SLM; 19	CLT	TAL	ATL						39th	805	
2001	Capital City Motorsports	38	Ford	DAY	NSH; 19	WIN			KEN; 18	CLT	KAN	MCH; 24	POC	MEM; 21		KEN; 10	MCH; 24		NSH; 9				SLM; 17	TOL; 15			TAL; 25	ATL; 37	13th	2900	
2001	James Hylton Motorsports	4	Ford				SLM; 29																						13th	2900	
2001	Capital City Motorsports	4	Ford					GTY; 30																					13th	2900	
2001	Capital City Motorsports	60	Ford												GLN; 29														13th	2900	
2001	Norm Benning Racing	8	Ford															POC; 37											13th	2900	
2001	Del Markle	60	Ford																	ISF; 27									13th	2900	
2001	Mark Gibson Racing	56	Ford																		CHI; 26								13th	2900	
2001	Cunningham Motorsports	4	Ford																			DSF; 41			BLN; 29	CLT; 23			13th	2900	
2002	Capital City Motorsports	38	Ford	DAY; 32	ATL; 37	NSH; 16				KAN; 17			TOL; 14	SBO; 24				NSH; 13				CHI; 13	SLM; 25	TAL; 24	CLT; 35				17th	3175	
2002	Capital City Motorsports	83	Ford				SLM; 34	KEN; 30	CLT; DNQ						KEN; 15	BLN; 31				WIN; 33	DSF; 38								17th	3175	
2002	Cunningham Motorsports	4	Ford								POC; 34																		17th	3175	
2002	Capital City Motorsports	50	Ford									MCH; 24																	17th	3175	
2002	Capital City Motorsports	4	Ford														POC; 35		ISF; 35										17th	3175	
2003	Capital City Motorsports	38	Ford	DAY	ATL	NSH; 17	SLM	TOL	KEN; 15	CLT	BLN	KAN	MCH; 16	LER									TAL; 10	CLT	SBO				32nd	835	
2003	Capital City Motorsports	83	Chevy												POC; 33	POC; 34	NSH	ISF	WIN	DSF									32nd	835	
2003	Jeff Caudell	14	Ford																		CHI; 35	SLM							32nd	835	
2004	Capital City Motorsports	38	Ford	DAY; 17	NSH	SLM	KEN	TOL	CLT	KAN	POC	MCH; 14			KEN; 21														53rd	570	
2004	Mark Gibson Racing	56	Chevy										SBO; 28	BLN															53rd	570	
2004	Wayne Peterson Racing	16	Chevy													GTW; DNQ	POC	LER	NSH	ISF	TOL	DSF	CHI	SLM	TAL				53rd	570	
2010	Capital City Motorsports	38	Dodge	DAY; DNQ	PBE	SLM																							120th	95	
2010	Hixson Motorsports	28	Chevy				TEX; 32	TAL	TOL	POC	MCH	IOW	MFD	POC	BLN	NJE	ISF	CHI	DSF	TOL	SLM	KAN	CAR						120th	95	
