= ARCA races at Gateway Motorsports Park =

ARCA Menards Series races at Gateway Motorsports Park

- Venue: World Wide Technology Raceway
- Location: Madison, Illinois, United States

Circuit information
- Surface: Asphalt
- Length: 1.250 mi (2.012 km)
- Turns: 4

Stock car racing events in the ARCA Menards Series have been held at World Wide Technology Raceway, in Madison, Illinois during numerous seasons and times of year since 1997.

== Current race ==
TBA
- First race: 1997
- Distance: 150 mi (241.402 km)
- Laps: 120
- Previous names: Gateway ARCA 125 (1997); Gateway ARCA 150 (2001); Shop n' Save 150 (2004–2006); Gateway ARCA 150 (2007); PapaNicholas Coffee 150 (2018); Day to Day Coffee 150 (2019); Dutch Boy 150 (2020)
- Most wins (driver): Ty Gibbs (2)
- Most wins (team): Joe Gibbs Racing (2)
- Most wins (manufacturer): Dodge (4)

The ARCA race at Gateway Motorsports Park is an ARCA Menards Series race held at the Gateway Motorsports Park in Madison, Illinois.

=== History ===
The race was first held in 1997 and was removed before returning again in 2001. It was originally 125 miles (201.168 km), but was increased to 150 miles (241.402 km). The race was removed after 2001 and remained on the schedule from 2004 through 2007.

After a ten-year hiatus from the track, ARCA returned in 2018 and remained until 2020.

On October 13, 2026, it was announced that Gateway would return to the schedule, replacing the race at Pocono.

It supports the NASCAR O'Reilly Auto Parts Series' Nu Way 225 and previously the NASCAR Truck Series' Toyota 200 for various years.

=== Past winners ===
Year	Date	No.	Driver	Team	Manufacturer	Race Distance		Race Time	Average Speed (mph)	Report	Ref
Year	Date	No.	Driver	Team	Manufacturer	Laps	Miles (km)	Race Time	Average Speed (mph)	Report	Ref
1997	September 14	59	Mark Gibson	Mark Gibson Racing	Ford	100	125 (201.168)	1:18:52	95.097	Report	
1998 — 2000	Not held										
2001	May 5	46	Frank Kimmel	Clement Racing	Ford	64*	80 (128.748)	0:47:52	100.279	Report	
2002 — 2003	Not held										
2004	July 16	64	Ryan Hemphill	Braun Racing	Dodge	120	150 (241.402)	1:34:00	95.745	Report	
2005	July 29	9	Joey Miller	Hagans Racing	Dodge	120	150 (241.402)	1:40:36	89.463	Report	
2006	July 28	50	Cale Gale	Bobby Jones Racing	Dodge	142*	177.5 (285.659)	2:08:48	82.686	Report	
2007	August 31	40	Bryan Clauson	Chip Ganassi Racing	Dodge	120	150 (241.402)	1:41:21	88.801	Report	
2008 — 2017	Not held										
2018	June 22	28	Sheldon Creed	MDM Motorsports	Toyota	120	150 (241.402)	1:27:01	103.428	Report	
2019	June 22	18	Ty Gibbs	Joe Gibbs Racing	Toyota	120	150 (241.402)	1:57:18	97.773	Report	
2020	August 28	18	Ty Gibbs	Joe Gibbs Racing	Toyota	120	150 (241.402)	1:32:58	96.809	Report	
2021 — 2026	Not held										
2027	August 20									Report	

Notes

- 2001: Race shortened due to rain
- 2006: Race extended due to a Green–white–checker finish.

== ARCA East / ARCA West ==
Monaco Cocktails Gateway Classic 125
- First race: 2018
- Last race: 2019
- Distance: 156 mi (251.058 km)
- Laps: 125
- Previous names: Monaco Gateway Classic (2018); Monaco Cocktails Gateway Classic 125 (2019)
- Most wins (driver): Derek Kraus; Spencer Davis (1)
- Most wins (team): Bill McAnally Racing; Rette Jones Racing (1)
- Most wins (manufacturer): Toyota; Ford (1)

The Monaco Cocktails Gateway Classic 125 was a combination race between NASCAR K&N Pro Series East and NASCAR K&N Pro Series West at the World Wide Technology Raceway.

=== History ===
The race was added to the 2018 NASCAR K&N Pro Series East schedule. It was taken off after the 2019 season.

=== Past winners ===
Year	Date	No.	Driver	Team	Manufacturer	Race Distance		Race Time	Average Speed (mph)	Report	Ref
Year	Date	No.	Driver	Team	Manufacturer	Laps	Miles (km)	Race Time	Average Speed (mph)	Report	Ref
2018	August 24	16	Derek Kraus	Bill McAnally Racing	Toyota	120	150 (241.402)	1:22:32	109.047	Report	
2019	August 24	30	Spencer Davis	Rette Jones Racing	Ford	98*	122.5 (197.144)	1:30:07	81.561	Report	

Notes

- 2019: Race shortened to 98 laps due to time constraints.
