= William Thomas =

William, Willie, Bill, or Billy Thomas may refer to:

== Academics ==
- W. I. Thomas (William Isaac Thomas, 1863–1947), American sociologist
- William Jenkyn Thomas (1870–1959), Welsh headmaster and author
- William Davies Thomas (1889–1954), Welsh literary scholar
- William G. Thomas III (born 1964), American historian
- William Thomas (historian) (1936–2025), British historian
- C. William Thomas, American accounting academic

== Arts and entertainment ==
=== Literature ===
- William Moy Thomas (1828–1910), English journalist, literary editor and novelist
- William Thomas (Islwyn) (1832–1878), Welsh poet
- William Thomas (Gwilym Marles) (1834–1879), Welsh poet
- William Hannibal Thomas (1843–1935), American teacher, journalist, judge, writer and legislator
- William Beach Thomas (1868–1957), British author and journalist
- William F. Thomas (1924–2014), American newspaper editor

=== Performing arts ===
- William C. Thomas (1903–1984), American film producer
- Willie B. Thomas (1912–1977), American blues musician
- Bill Thomas (costume designer) (1921–2000), American costume designer
- Billie "Buckwheat" Thomas (William Thomas Jr., 1931–1980), American actor
- Willie Thomas (trumpeter) (1931–2019), American jazz trumpeter and educator
- William Thomas Jr. (1947–2020), American actor
- Bill Thomas (actor) (born 1952), English actor
- Billy Thomas (drummer) (born 1953), American drummer with McBride & the Ride
- William Thomas (actor) (fl. since 1974), Welsh actor
- Billie Geter Thomas (William Bryan Geter Thomas, 1902–1962), American educator and actress

=== Visual arts ===
- William Thomas (architect) (1799–1860), Anglo-Canadian architect
- William Tutin Thomas (1829–1892), Anglo-Canadian architect
- Bill Thomas (American writer, born 1934) (1934–2009), American author and photojournalist

== Business and industry ==
- William Bevil Thomas (1757–1825), Newfoundland merchant and land developer
- William Kyffin Thomas (1821–1878), Australian newspaper proprietor
- William Luson Thomas (1830–1900), British wood-engraver and newspaper proprietor
- William Thomas (miller) (1838–1891), Australian flour mill industrialist
- William Winstead Thomas (1848–1904), American insurance company president and architect
- Sir William James Thomas, 1st Baronet (1867–1945), Welsh industrialist and philanthropist
- Bill Thomas (businessman) (born 1959), British business executive

== Law and politics ==
=== Australia ===
- William Thomas (Australian settler) (1793–1867), Australian colonist
- William Thomas (Victorian politician) (1869–1924)
- William Lemen Thomas (1872–1921), Western Australian politician
- Bill Thomas (Australian politician) (born 1950), Western Australian politician

=== UK ===
- William Thomas (MP for Old Sarum and Downton) (died 1554), Welsh MP for Old Sarum and Downton
- William Thomas (MP for Caernarvonshire) (died 1586), English politician, MP for Caernarvonshire, 1574–86
- William Thomas (MP for Carnarvon) (died 1653), Welsh politician
- William Thomas (MP for Ludgershall) (1630–1686), English lawyer and politician
- Sir William Thomas, 1st Baronet (1641–1706), English politician
- Sir William Thomas, 2nd Baronet (died 1777), a Thomas baronet of Yapton
- Sir William Thomas, 4th Baronet (1777–1850), a Thomas baronet of Yapton
- Sir William Thomas, 5th Baronet (1807–1867), a Thomas baronet of Yapton
- Russell Thomas (politician) (William Stanley Russell Thomas, 1896–1957), British politician

=== US ===
- W. C. E. Thomas (William C. E. Thomas, 1818–1876), American civic leader
- William H. Thomas (Wisconsin politician) (1821–1898), American politician
- William W. Thomas Jr. (1839–1927), American diplomat and politician from Maine
- William H. Thomas (Alabama judge) (1867–1945), associate justice of the Alabama Supreme Court
- William H. Thomas (Maryland judge) (c. 1861–1924), judge of the Maryland Court of Appeals
- William Hannibal Thomas (1843–1935), American teacher, journalist, judge, writer and legislator
- William Reuben Thomas (1866–1943), American civic leader
- W. Aubrey Thomas (1866–1951), US representative from Ohio
- William M. Thomas (fl. 1868–1876), African-American politician in South Carolina
- William D. Thomas (1880–1936), American politician
- William Kernahan Thomas (1911–2001), American judge
- William Henry Thomas (1920–2009), American politician from Maryland
- Bill Thomas (Montana politician) (born 1935), American politician in Montana House of Representatives
- Bill Thomas (born 1941), US representative from California
- Bill Thomas (American writer, born 1943), American legal and political author
- Bill Thomas (Alaska politician) (born 1947), American politician in Alaska House of Representatives
- William L. Thomas (born 1967), American jurist

=== Elsewhere ===
- William Fitz Thomas (fl. 1415–1438), Irish judge
- William Thomas (Newfoundland politician) (1785–1863)
- William Howell Arthur Thomas (1895–1979), Canadian MP

== Military ==
- William ap Thomas (died 1445), Welsh soldier and sheriff
- William Holland Thomas (1805–1893), American Confederate army officer
- William Nathaniel Thomas (1892–1971), US Navy Chief of Chaplains
- William Bain Thomas (1898–1967), British Army officer
- William Garfield Thomas Jr. (1916–1942), American naval officer
- William Waffle Thomas (1919–2014), American air force officer, former Air Force One pilot
- William H. Thomas (Medal of Honor) (1923–1945), American soldier

== Religion ==
- William Thomas (bishop of Worcester) (1613–1689), Welsh Anglican bishop of Worcester
- William Thomas (antiquary) (1670–1738), English Anglican priest and antiquary
- William Thomas (chancellor of Llandaff Cathedral) (1734–1799), Welsh Anglican priest and scholar
- William Griffith Thomas (1861–1924), English Anglican priest and theologian
- William Jones Thomas (1811–1886), Welsh Anglican priest
- William M. M. Thomas (1878–1951), American Episcopal bishop of the Missionary District of Brazil
- William Nathaniel Thomas (1892–1971), American Methodist minister and US Navy Chief of Chaplains
- William S. Thomas (1901–1986), American Episcopal suffragan bishop of the Diocese of Pittsburgh
- William Thomas (archdeacon of Northumberland) (1927–2020), English Anglican priest
- Bill Thomas (priest) (born 1943), British Anglican archdeacon of Llandaff

== Sports ==
=== American football ===
- William A. Thomas (1948–2019), coach
- Bill Thomas (American football) (born 1949)
- Willie Thomas (Canadian football) (born 1955)
- William Thomas (linebacker) (born 1968)
- Tra Thomas (William Thomas III, born 1974)

=== Association football (soccer) ===
- William Thomas (footballer, born 1885) (1885–?), English soccer player
- Billy Thomas (footballer, born 1903) (1903–1992), Welsh footballer
- Bill Thomas (New Zealand footballer) (fl. 1923), New Zealand footballer

=== Australian rules football ===
- Bill Thomas (Australian footballer) (1886–1974)
- William "Digger" Thomas (1890–1953)
- Billy Thomas (Australian footballer) (1902–1968)
- Bill Thomas (footballer, born 1930)

=== Rugby ===
- Willie Thomas (rugby union) (1866–1921), Welsh rugby union footballer
- William Llewellyn Thomas (1872–1943), Welsh rugby union footballer
- Willie Thomas (rugby league) (1881–1963), Welsh rugby league footballer
- Billy Thomas (rugby league) (1907–1972), Welsh rugby league footballer
- Billy Thomas (rugby union) (1933–2013), Welsh rugby union player

=== Other sports ===
- Bill Thomas (baseball) (1877–1950), American baseball player
- Bill Thomas (pitcher) (1880-1906?) American baseball pitcher
- Bill Thomas (sailor) (1918–1982), Canadian sailor
- Will Thomas (bowls) (William Thomas, born 1954), Welsh lawn and indoor bowler
- William Thomas (cricketer) (born 1960), English cricketer
- William Thomas (karateka) (born 1965), English karateka
- William Godfrey Thomas (1915–1982), Australian rower and rowing coach
- Billy Thomas (basketball) (born 1975), American basketball player
- Bill Thomas (ice hockey) (born 1983), American ice hockey player
- Will Thomas (basketball) (William Thomas, born 1986), American basketball player
- Bill Thomas (basketball) (1931–2023), American college basketball player and coach
- Bill Thomas (cricketer) (1921–2000), English cricketer and schoolmaster

== Others ==
- William Thelwall Thomas (1865–1927), Welsh surgeon
- Wilhelm Meyer (Adolph Beck case) (a.k.a. William Thomas, fl. c. 1903), gained notoriety in Adolph Beck case
- William Thomas (activist) (1947–2009), American anti-nuclear activist
- William H. Thomas (physician) (born 1959), American physician

== See also ==
- Will Thomas (disambiguation)
- William Thomas Jr. (disambiguation)
