= William H. Thomas =

William H. Thomas may refer to:

- William Hannibal Thomas (1843–1935), American teacher, journalist, judge, writer and legislator
- William H. Thomas (Wisconsin politician) (1821–1898), American politician
- William Henry Thomas (1920–2009), American politician
- William Holland Thomas (1805–1893), American Confederate army officer
- William H. Thomas (Medal of Honor) (1923–1945), American soldier
- William H. Thomas (physician) (born 1959), American physician
- William H. Thomas (Alabama judge) (1867–1945), associate justice of the Alabama Supreme Court
- William H. Thomas (Maryland judge) (c. 1861–1924), judge of the Maryland Court of Appeals

== See also ==
- William Howell Arthur Thomas (1895–1979), Canadian MP
- William Huw-Thomas (fl. since 1974), Welsh actor
- William Thomas (disambiguation)
