= Southern Illinois 100 =

ARCA Menards Series race at the DuQuoin State Fairgrounds Racetrack

Audubon Park 100
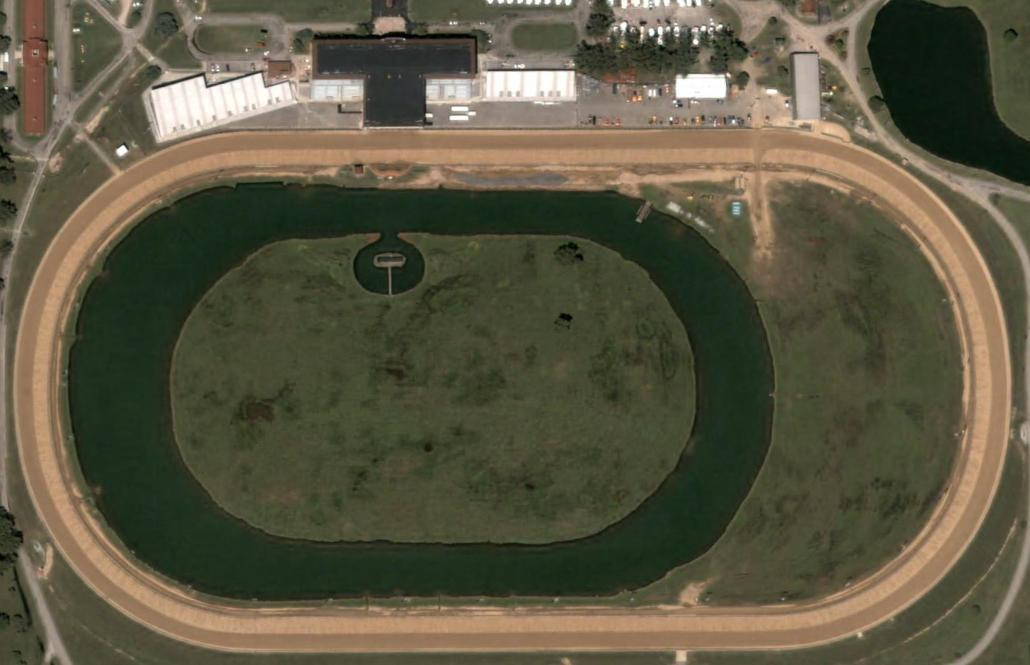

ARCA Menards Series
- Venue: DuQuoin State Fairgrounds Racetrack
- Location: Du Quoin, Illinois, United States
- First race: 1948
- Last race: DuQuoin 100 (1948–1949, 1981–1982); DuQuoin 150 (1950); Ted Horn Memorial (1951–1969, 1982–1983); DuQuoin 200 (1984); Southern Illinois 200 (1985–1991); Southern Illinois 250K (1992–1995); Southern Illinois 100 (1996–2000, 2003–2015, 2019–2025); Federated Auto Parts 100 (2001–2002); General Tire Grabber 100 (2016–2018)
- Distance: 100 mi (160.934 km)
- Laps: 100

Circuit information
- Surface: Clay
- Length: 0.99 mi (1.59 km)
- Turns: 4

The Audubon Park 100 (commonly known as the Southern Illinois 100) is an ARCA Menards Series stock car race held annually on the DuQuoin State Fairgrounds Racetrack during the DuQuoin State Fair on Labor Day weekend.

It is one of two dirt races on the ARCA schedule, the other being the Springfield ARCA 100 at the Illinois State Fairgrounds Racetrack, both of which are longtime events on the series schedule. These two races are part of the Performance Seed Dirt Double, which is a $20,000 bonus that is given to a driver who wins both races (the last time it happened was Parker Kligerman in 2009) and if not, bonuses are given to the drivers with the three best average finishes in the two races ($7,500 for first best, $5,000 for second best and $2,500 for third best).

== Race history ==
The first 100-mile stock car race at the track was held in 1950. It has been a part of a national stock car circuit annually since 1954. AAA sanctioned the race until 1955, USAC from 1956 to 1984, and ARCA took over solely in 1985 after co-sanctioning the race in 1983 and 1984.

In the 2000s and 2010s, the race saw participation from NASCAR Cup Series regulars Tony Stewart and Ken Schrader. Stewart won the race in 2003, and Schrader was victorious in 2006, 2007, and 2013.

Starting in 2022, ARCA would offer a $20,000 bonus if a driver were to win this race and the other dirt race at the Illinois State Fairgrounds Racetrack. No driver has won it in both years of it being offered. This bonus is sponsored by Performance Seed.

== Race winners ==
Year	Date	No.	Driver	Team	Manufacturer	Race Distance		Race Time	Average Speed (mph)	Report	Ref
Year	Date	No.	Driver	Team	Manufacturer	Laps	Miles (km)	Race Time	Average Speed (mph)	Report	Ref
AAA / USAC Champ Car Series
1948	September 4	12	Lee Wallard	John Iddings	Offy	100	100	1:07:53	88.381	Report	
1948	October 10	7	Johnnie Parsons	Kurtis Kraft	Offy	100	100	1:11:47	83.572	Report	
1949	September 3	99	Tony Bettenhausen	Meyer & Drake	Offy	100	100	1:06:37	90.065	Report	
1950	Not held										
1951	September 1	99	Tony Bettenhausen	Murrell Belanger	Offy	100	100	1:07:56	88.311	Report	
1951	September 3	99	Tony Bettenhausen	Murrell Belanger	Offy	101*	101	1:09:19	86.559	Report	
1952	September 1	16	Chuck Stevenson	Bessie Lee Paoli	Offy	100	100	1:07:52	88.409	Report	
1953	September 7	3	Sam Hanks		Offy	100	100	1:06:40	89.984	Report	
1954	September 6	99	Sam Hanks	Murrell Belanger	Offy	100	100	0:56:34	88.029	Report	
1955	September 5	1	Jimmy Bryan	Al Dean	Offy	100	100	1:04:09	93.53	Report	
1956	September 3	2	Jimmy Bryan	Al Dean	Offy	100	100	1:05:26	91.706	Report	
1957	September 2	2	Jud Larson	John Zink	Offy	100	100	1:05:58	90.948	Report	
1958	September 1	7	Johnny Thomson	Racing Associates	Offy	100	100	1:03:19	94.753	Report	
1959	September 7	5	Rodger Ward	Bob Wilke	Offy	100	100	1:04:20	93.267	Report	
1960	September 5	5	A.J. Foyt	George Bignotti	Offy	100	100	1:04:16	93.351	Report	
1961	September 4	1	A.J. Foyt	George Bignotti	Offy	100	100	1:04:41	92.755	Report	
1952	Not held										
1963	September 2	2	A.J. Foyt	Ansted-Thompson Racing	Offy	100	100	1:03:00	95.234	Report	
1964	September 7	1	A.J. Foyt	Ansted-Thompson Racing	Offy	100	100	1:01:21	97.8	Report	
1965	September 6	4	Don Branson	Bob Wilke	Offy	100	100	1:07:34	88.792	Report	
1966	September 5	22	Bud Tingelstad	Federal Automotive Associates	Offy	100	100	1:03:05	95.102	Report	
1967	September 4	14	A.J. Foyt	Ansted-Thompson Racing	Offy	100	100	1:04:07	93.578	Report	
1968	September 2	2	Mario Andretti	Mario Andretti	Offy	100	100	1:05:34	91.518	Report	
1969	September 1	3	Al Unser	Parnelli Jones	Ford	100	100	1:03:21	94.724	Report	
1970	September 7	2	Al Unser	Vel Miletich	Ford	100	100	1:01:08	98.155	Report	
1971 – 1980	Not held										
1981	August 30	3	Rich Vogler	Johnny Vance	Chevrolet	100	100	1:01:13	98.013	Report	
1982	September 6	7	Gary Bettenhausen		Chevrolet	100	100			Report	
ARCA Series
1983	September 4	99	Dean Roper	Mueller Brothers	Pontiac	100	100	1:06:36	90.101	Report	
USAC Championship Car Series
1983	September 5	9	Gary Bettenhausen		Chevrolet	100	100			Report	
ARCA Series
1984	September 2	65	David Goldsberry	Joe Naegler	Buick	200	200	3:22:38	59.22	Report	
1985	September 1	1	Lee Raymond	Jim Coyle	Chevrolet	200	200	2:27:34	81.319	Report	
1986	August 31	89	Dean Roper	Mueller Brothers	Pontiac	200	200	2:20:24	85.47	Report	
1987	September 6	89	Dean Roper	Mueller Brothers	Pontiac	200	200			Report	
1988	September 4	29	Bob Keselowski	Ron Keselowski	Chevrolet	200	200	2:19:12	86.207	Report	
1989	September 3	29	Bob Keselowski	Ron Keselowski	Pontiac	200	200	2:23:26	83.663	Report	
1990	September 2	34	Bob Brevak	Bob Brevak	Buick	200	200	2:23:26	83.663	Report	
1991	September 1	26	Bob Brevak	Roulo Brothers	Chevrolet	139*	139	1:22:38	81.26	Report	
1992	September 6	75	Bob Schacht	Bob Schacht	Buick	156	156	1:55:09	81.285	Report	
1993	September 5	22	Billy Thomas	Billy Thomas	Pontiac	156	156	1:51:43	83.783	Report	
1994	September 4	99	Dean Roper	Mueller Brothers	Pontiac	160*	160	2:00:04	79.956	Report	
1995	September 3	46	Bob Hill	Larry Clement	Chevrolet	170	170	2:17:53	73.976	Report	
1996	September 1	46	Bob Hill	Larry Clement	Chevrolet	108	108	1:30:09	71.8	Report	
1997	August 31	22	Billy Thomas	Billy Thomas	Pontiac	100	100	1:40:15	71.217	Report	
1998	September 6	22	Billy Thomas	Billy Thomas	Pontiac	100	100	1:27:52	68.285	Report	
1999	September 5	83	Jeff Finley	Ed Rensi	Chevrolet	100	100	1:26:38	69.257	Report	
2000	September 3	22	Billy Thomas	Billy Thomas	Chevrolet	100	100	1:55:35	51.91	Report	
2001	September 3	46	Frank Kimmel	Larry Clement	Chevrolet	100	100	1:29:41	66.902	Report	
2002	September 1	46	Frank Kimmel	Larry Clement	Ford	105*	105	1:18:07	71.496	Report	
2003	September 1	18	Tony Stewart	Tony Stewart	Chevrolet	103*	103	1:37:22	63.471	Report	
2004	September 6	46	Frank Kimmel	Larry Clement	Ford	93*	93	1:15:51	73.566	Report	
2005	September 5	46	Frank Kimmel	Larry Clement	Ford	100	100	1:07:57	88.3	Report	
2006	September 4	99	Ken Schrader	Ken Schrader	Chevrolet	100	100	1:11:55	83.43	Report	
2007	September 3	52	Ken Schrader	Ken Schrader	Chevrolet	100	100	1:20:33	74.488	Report	
2008	September 1	44	Frank Kimmel	Frank Kimmel	Ford	102*	102	1:13:16	83.53	Report	
2009	September 7	77	Parker Kligerman	Briggs Cunningham	Dodge	100	100	1:29:28	67.064	Report	
2010	September 6	55	Steve Arpin	Venturini Motorsports	Chevrolet	100	100	1:22:29	72.735	Report	
2011	September 5	17	Chris Buescher	Roulo Brothers Racing	Ford	104*	104	1:24:41	73.679	Report	
2012	Race canceled due to rain										
2013	September 2	52	Ken Schrader	Ken Schrader Racing	Chevrolet	102*	102	1:19:02	77.428	Report	
2014	September 1	90	Grant Enfinger	GMS Racing	Chevrolet	100	100	1:19:08	75.819	Report	
2015	September 7	23	Grant Enfinger	GMS Racing	Chevrolet	104*	104	1:31:19	68.336	Report	
2016	September 4	25	Tom Hessert III	Venturini Motorsports	Toyota	105*	105	1:19:17	79.462	Report	
2017	September 4	52	Austin Theriault	Ken Schrader Racing	Toyota	110*	110	1:21:59	79.8	Report	
2018	September 3	20	Logan Seavey	Venturini Motorsports	Toyota	100	100	1:30:27	66.33	Report	
2019	August 31	15	Christian Eckes	Venturini Motorsports	Toyota	100	100	1:05:08	92.119	Report	
2020	Race canceled due to the COVID-19 pandemic										
2021	September 5	2	Landen Lewis	Rev Racing	Chevrolet	104*	104	1:34:08	24.527	Report	
2022	September 4	24	Ryan Unzicker	Hendren Motorsports	Chevrolet	78*	78	1:20:12	58.354	Report	
2023	September 3	20	Jesse Love	Venturini Motorsports	Toyota	100	100	1:18:44	76.207	Report	
2024	September 1	20	Brent Crews	Venturini Motorsports	Toyota	102*	102	1:13:46	82.964	Report	
2025	August 31	28	Brenden Queen	Pinnacle Racing Group	Chevrolet	104*	104	1:28:58	70.139	Report	
2026	September 6	28	Carson Brown	Pinnacle Racing Group	Chevrolet	100	100			Report	

Previous race: Atlas 200	ARCA Menards Series; Audubon Park 100	Next race: Spruce 212
