= William Thomas Jr. (disambiguation) =

William Thomas Jr. (1947–2020) is an American actor.

William Thomas Jr. may also refer to:

- William Thomas Jr. (child actor) or Billie "Buckwheat" Thomas (1931–1980), American actor
- William A. Thomas Jr. or Bill Thomas (born 1947), American politician from Alaska
- William Garfield Thomas Jr. (1916–1942), American naval officer
- William S. Thomas Jr. (1901–1986), American Episcopal bishop
- William W. Thomas Jr. (1839–1927), American diplomat and politician from Maine

== See also ==
- William Thomas (disambiguation)
