= Americanization =

Global influence of US culture

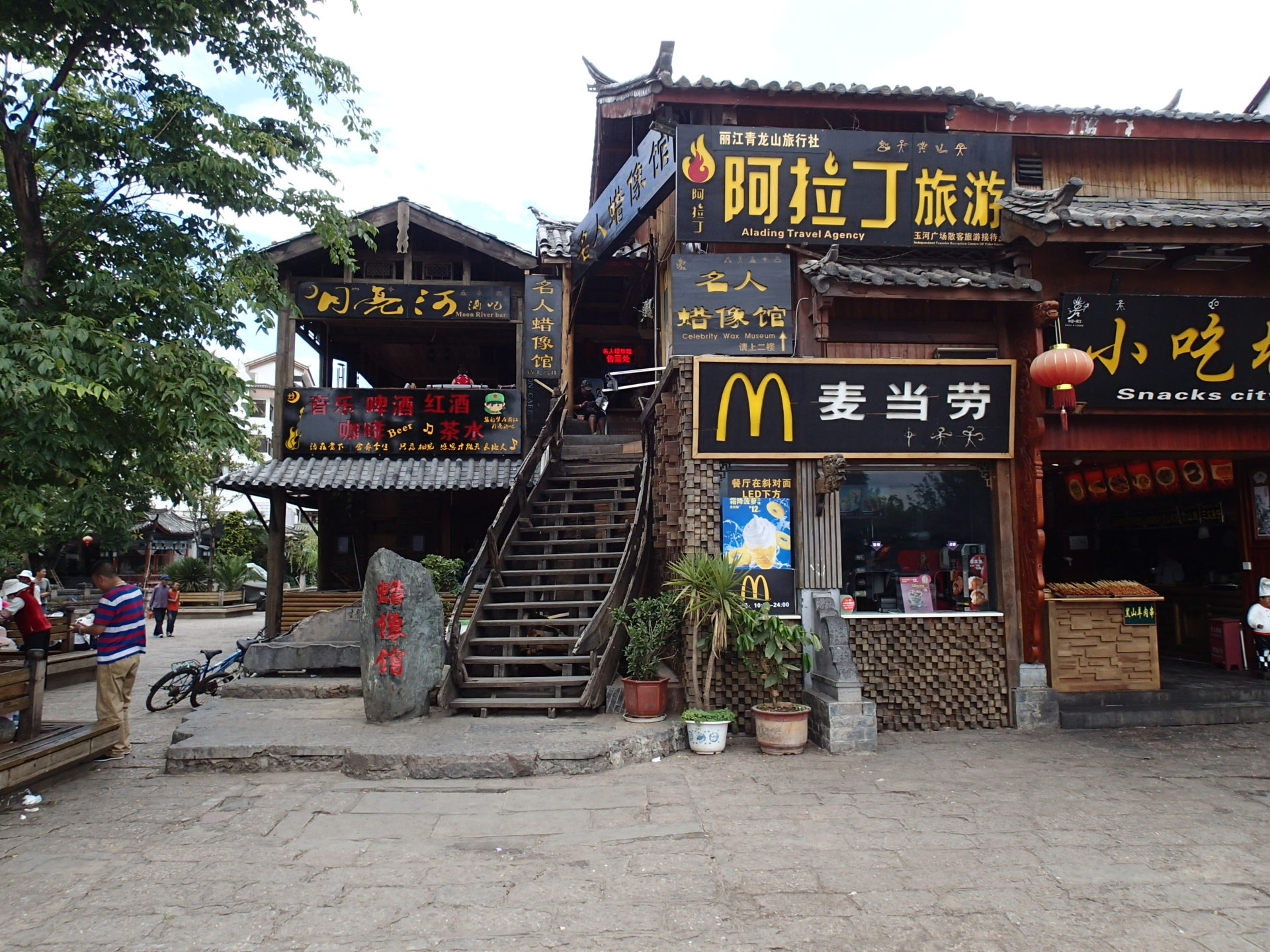
United States-based fast food franchises, such as this McDonald's location in China, are widely seen as a symbol of Americanization in many countries.

Americanization or Americanisation (see spelling differences) is the influence of the American culture and economy on other countries outside the United States, including their media, cuisine, business practices, popular culture, technology and political techniques.

The cinema of the United States has dominated most of the world's medias markets since the 1910s, and is the chief medium by which the international community sees American fashions, customs, scenery, and way of life. The majority of the top 50 highest-grossing films of all time have been made either entirely or partially in the United States or were financed by U.S. production companies, even with limited or no artistic involvement. The top 50 constituents set and filmed entirely in the United Kingdom, like some of the Harry Potter franchise, or with deliberately and quintessentially British source material, like the Lord of the Rings series, count as American productions for solely financial reasons. This coopting of the works of other nations and cultures into "American" works (and the hegemonic ability to do as such) forms part of many critical definitions of Americanization.

United States-based commercial enterprises operating internationally are also associated with Americanization. Notably, the Coca-Cola Company was previously the top global company by revenue, giving rise to the term "Coca-Cola diplomacy" for anything emblematic of U.S. soft power. U.S.-based fast food franchises such as McDonald's, Subway, Starbucks, Burger King, Pizza Hut, KFC and Domino's Pizza, among others, have numerous outlets around the world. Of the top ten global brands (2017) by revenue, seven are based in the United States: Apple Inc., Google, Microsoft, Coca-Cola, Amazon, Facebook, and IBM.

During the Cold War, Americanization was the primary soft power method chosen to counter the more hard power-orientated polar process of Sovietization around the world. Education, schools, and particularly universities became the main target for Americanization. Resistance to Americanization within the university community restrained its effectiveness, though it was still much more successful than Sovietization. Americanization has become more prevalent since the collapse of the Soviet Union in 1991, which left the United States as the world's sole superpower (the full soft power of China as a potential competing influence has yet to manifest within Occidental pop culture). Americanization found yet another gear with the advent of widespread high-speed Internet use in the mid-2000s (notably heavily censored in China).

Criticism of Americanization has included opposition to U.S. investments in Europe during the 1960s, which subsided by the 1970s. A new dimension of anti-Americanism is fear of the pervasiveness of American Internet technology.

== Definitions ==
Like many concepts in social sciences, the term has been called ambiguous, however, a rough consensus on its meaning exists. Harm G. Schröter who focused on the economic dimension of the process, defined it as "an adapted transfer of values, behaviours, institutions, technologies, patterns of organization, symbols and norms from the [United States] to the economic life of other states". Mel van Elteren defined this in a negative way, as "a process in which economic, technological, political, social, cultural and/or socio–psychological influences emanating from America or Americans impinge on values, norms, belief systems, mentalities, habits, rules, technologies, practices, institutions and behaviors of non-Americans".

== Media and popular culture ==
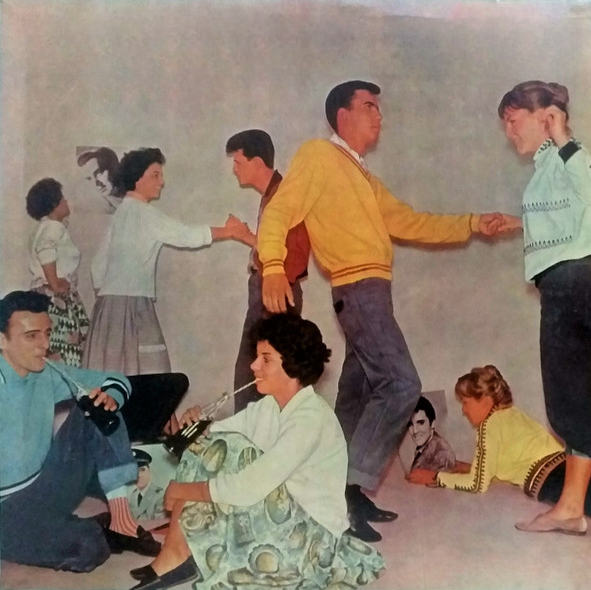
Photograph used on the cover of a nueva ola record released in Argentina in 1960. An example of the Americanization that characterized the new youth mass culture, it depicts young people dancing rock and roll, drinking Coca-Cola, wearing blue jeans and admiring American singers.

Hollywood, the American film and television industry, has since the 1910s dominated most of the world's media markets. It is the chief medium by which people across the globe see American fashions, customs, scenery, and way of life. The major film studios of the United States are the primary source of the most commercially successful and most ticket selling movies in the world. Nearly all the top 50 highest-grossing films of all time were made entirely or partially in the United States.

In general, the U.S. government plays only a facilitating role in the dissemination of films, television, books, journals etc. However, after the occupation of the former Axis countries during World War II, the U.S. government played a major role in restructuring the media in those countries to eliminate totalitarianism and to promote democracy against fascism and Nazism. For example, in Germany, the American occupation headquarters, Office of Military Government (OMGUS), began its own newspaper based in Munich in 1945. Die Neue Zeitung was edited by German and Jewish émigrés who had fled to the United States before the war. Its mission was to destroy Nazi cultural remnants and encourage democracy by exposing Germans to the ways American culture operated. There was great detail on sports, politics, business, Hollywood, fashions, and international affairs.

Despite the restrictions placed by communist authorities, Americanization would continue to spread out over the Iron Curtain even before the collapse of the Soviet Union and accelerated afterwards. The first McDonald's in Soviet Russia had a grand opening on Moscow's Pushkin Square on 31 January 1990 with approximately 38,000 customers waiting in hours long lines, breaking company records at the time. By 1997, there were 21 locations of the Russian chain.

The importation of Little Golden Books (Petits Livres d'Or) to France under the publisher Cocorico after World War II is discussed as a subtle way of implementing cultural productions that "presented the economic principles of American liberalism in a favorable light" in a study by Cécile Boulaire.

Foreign versions of American television programs are rebroadcast around the world, many of them through American broadcasters and their subsidiaries (such as HBO Asia, CNBC Europe and CNN International). Many of the distributors broadcast American programming on their television channels. In 2006, a survey of 20 countries by Radio Times found seven American shows in the ten most watched: CSI: Miami, Lost, Desperate Housewives, The Simpsons, CSI: Crime Scene Investigation, Without a Trace, and The Adventures of Jimmy Neutron: Boy Genius.

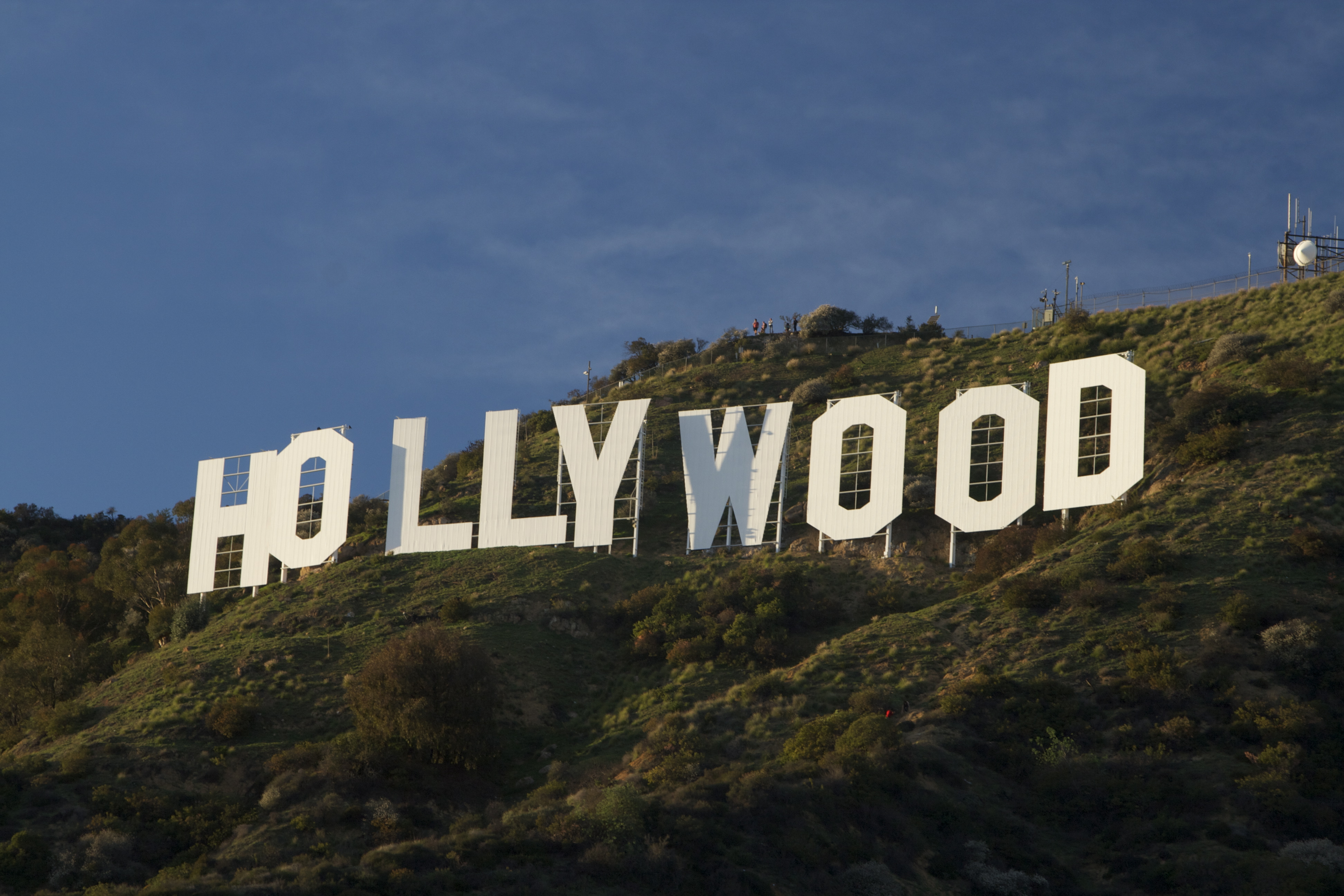
The iconic Hollywood Sign in Los Angeles, California

American films have been historically extremely popular around the world and often dominate cinemas as a result of a high demand of U.S. product exported to consumers to clear away the outlook of World War II. Of the top 50 highest-grossing films of all time, 49 were made entirely or partially in the United States. Often, part of the negotiating in free trade agreements between the U.S. and other nations involves screen quotas. One such case is Mexico, which abolished screen quotas after the establishment of the North American Free Trade Agreement (NAFTA) with the U.S. and Canada.

Many American musicians, such as Elvis Presley and Michael Jackson, are popular worldwide and have sold over 500 million albums each. Michael Jackson's album Thriller, at 100 million sales, is the best-selling album of all time internationally.

By the study of vocabulary and spelling of English words in books and tweets, American English is more common in communities of the European Union than British English.

=== Sports ===
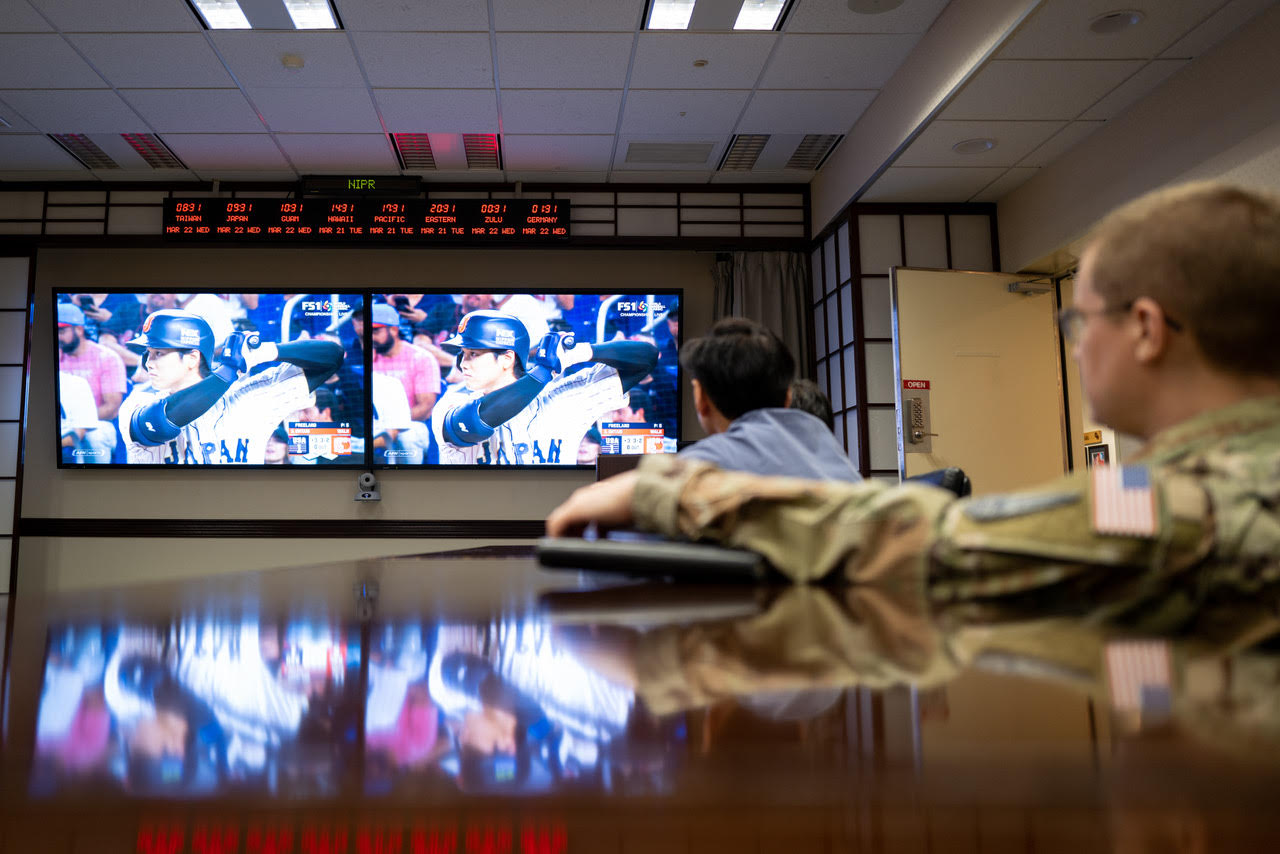
American military in Japan watching the two countries in the 2023 World Baseball Classic final

Baseball's international spread is largely because of historical American influence on the rest of the world; the sport was seen as being connected to military ventures abroad. The desire to spread baseball came partially from the American values it was said to impart, as it was identified in the late 19th century as being egalitarian in nature. It is now prevalent in parts of Latin America and the Asia-Pacific, having become an integral part of local cultures.

Basketball and other American sports also played a role in spreading American influence into the world. In addition, the United States's influence played a role in elevating and altering the role of sports in general on a global level, such as in the Olympic Games. Sports first became part of governmental efforts to engage with the world during the Cold War.

== Business and brands ==
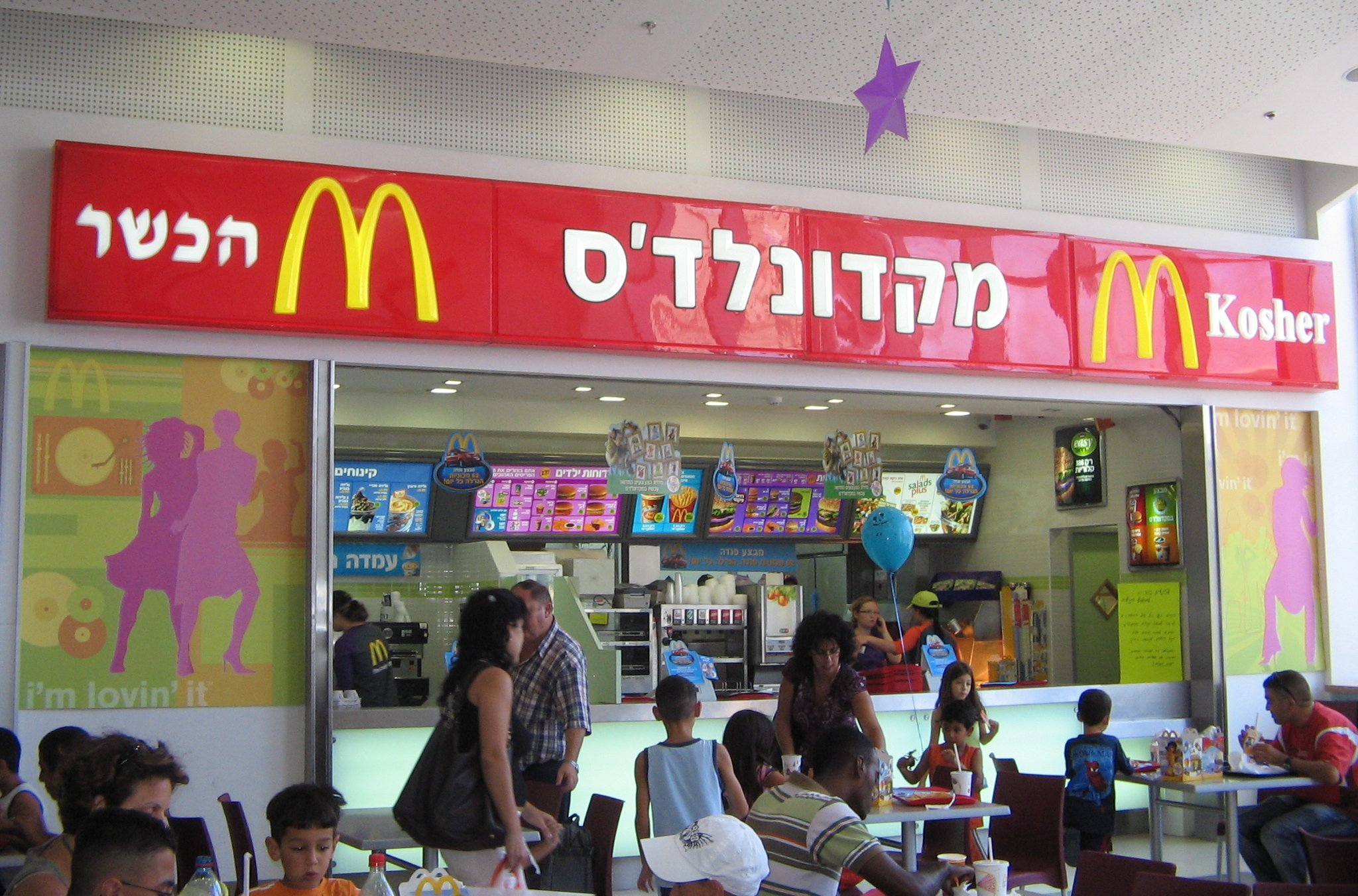
A kosher McDonald's in Ashkelon, Israel

Many of the world's largest companies, such as Alphabet (Google), Amazon, AT&T, Apple, Coca-Cola, Disney, General Motors, McDonald's, Nike, Meta, Microsoft, Pepsi, and Walmart, were founded and are headquartered in the United States. Of the world's 500 largest companies, 124 are headquartered in the U.S. Coca-Cola, which previously held the top spot, is often viewed as a symbol of Americanization, giving rise to the term "Coca-Cola diplomacy" for anything emblematic of U.S. soft power. The American fast food industry, the world's first and largest, is also often viewed as being a symbol of U.S. marketing dominance. Companies such as McDonald's, Burger King, Pizza Hut, Kentucky Fried Chicken, and Domino's Pizza, among others, have numerous outlets around the world.

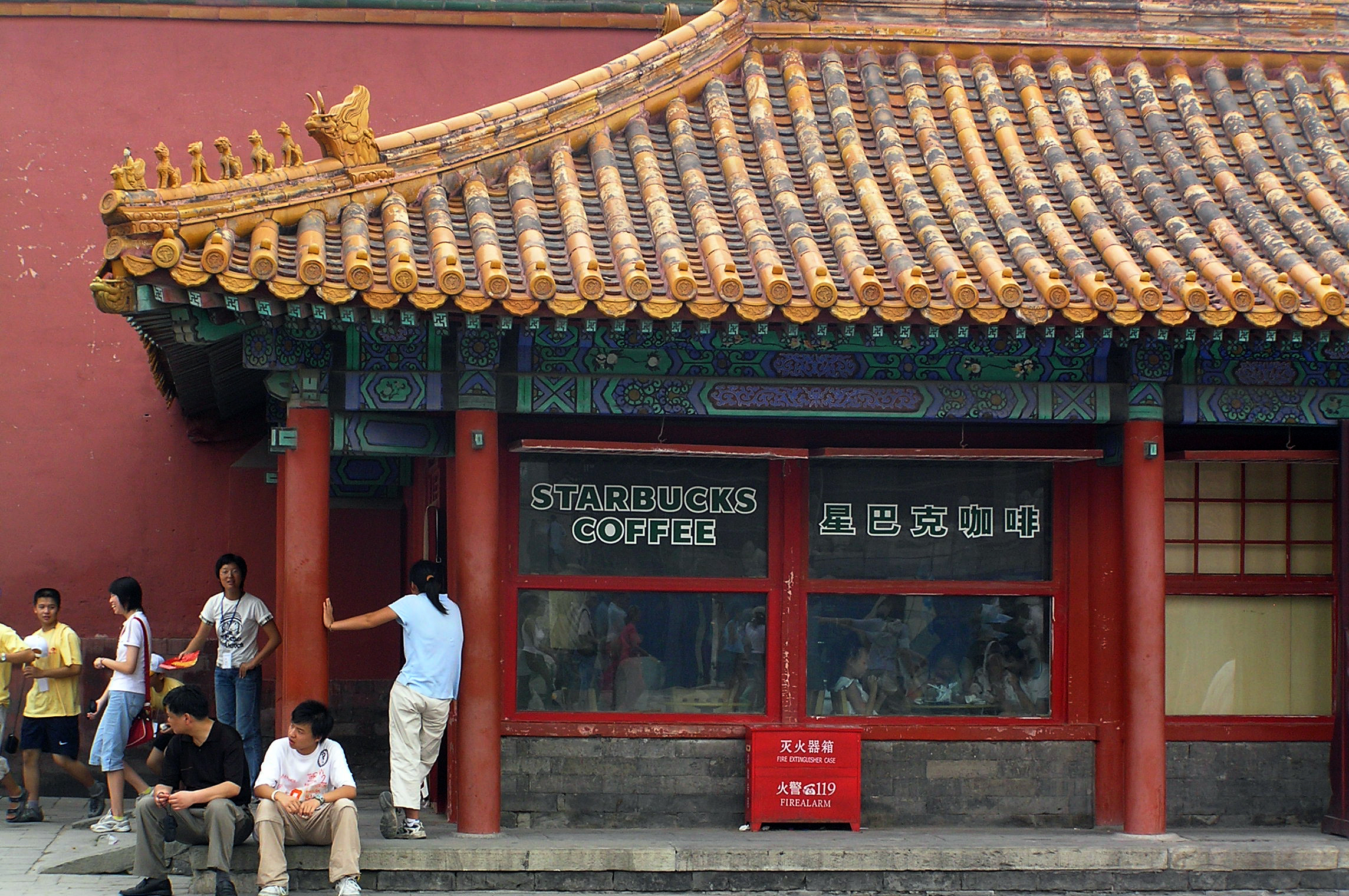
Starbucks Coffee at the Forbidden City, China

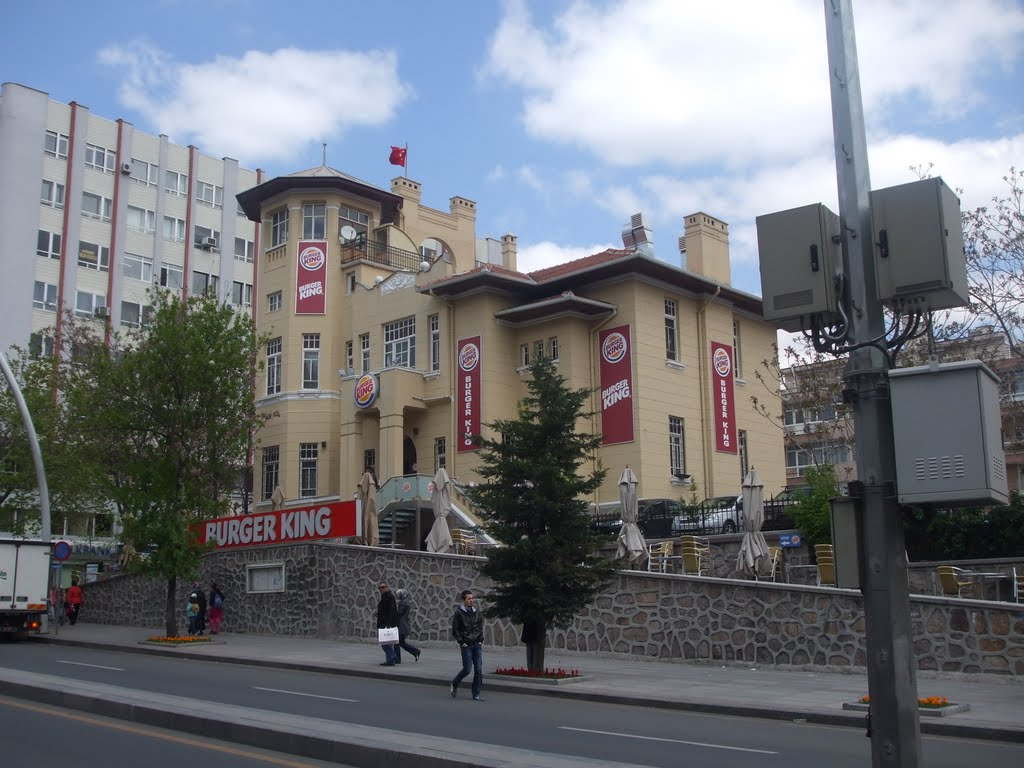
Burger King in Ankara, Turkey

Many of the world's biggest computer companies are also U.S.-based, such as Microsoft, Apple, Intel, HP Inc., Dell, and IBM, and much of the software bought worldwide is created by U.S.-based companies. Carayannis and Campbell note, "The [United States] occupies, also in global terms, a very strong position in the software sector."

Even as far back as 1900, some observers saw "Americanization" as synonymous with progress and innovation. In Germany during the 1920s, the American efficiency movement was called "rationalization" and was a powerful social and economic force. In part, it looked explicitly at American models, especially Fordism. "Rationalization" meant higher productivity and greater efficiency and promised that science would bring prosperity. More generally, it promised a new level of modernity and was applied to economic production and consumption as well as public administration. Various versions of rationalization were promoted by industrialists and social democrats, by engineers and architects, by educators and academics, by middle-class feminists and social workers, by government officials and politicians of many parties. As ideology and practice, rationalization challenged and transformed not only machines, factories, and vast business enterprises but also the lives of middle-class and working-class Germans.

Department stores threatened the more local businesses, with low prices and chain-managed stores. The small businesses were determined and fought back to protect their source of income from the U.S. market.

During the Cold War, Americanization was the method to counter the processes of Sovietization around the world. Education, schools, and particularly universities became the main target for Americanization. However, resistance to Americanization of the university community restrained it, although it was still much more successful than Sovietization.

== Visibility ==
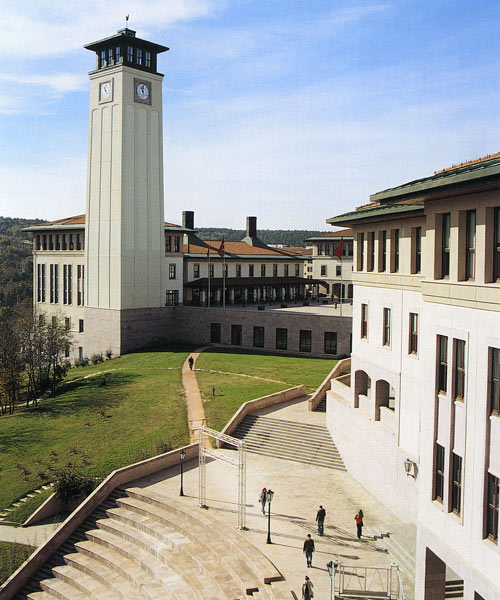
Koç University, one of the top universities in Turkey, is based on the American model. The university also has an American football team, the Koç Rams.

From 1950 to 1965, American investments in Europe soared by 800% to $13.9 billion, and in the European Economic Community they rose ten times to $6.25 billion. Europe's share of American investments increased from 15% to 28%. The investments were of very high visibility and generated much talk of Americanization. Even so, American investments in Europe represented only 50% of the total European investment and American-owned companies in the European Economic Community employ only 2 or 3% of the total labor force. The basic reason for U.S. investments is no longer lower production costs, faster economic growth, or higher profits in Europe but the desire to maintain a competitive position based largely on American technological superiority. Opposition to U.S. investments was originally confined to France but later spread to other European countries; for example, Finland has been considered a particularly Americanized country, even "the most Americanized in Europe", since the 1960s, which is why there was concern about Americanization at first, and some tried to limit it by regulating American television programs on the Finnish television channels. Public opinion began to resent American advertising and business methods, personnel policies, and the use of the English language by American companies. Criticism was also directed toward the international currency system which was blamed for inflationary tendencies as a result of the dominant position of the U.S. dollar. However, by the 1970s, European investments in the U.S. had increased even more rapidly than vice versa, and Geir Lundestad finds there was less talk of the Americans buying Europe.

== Recent trends ==
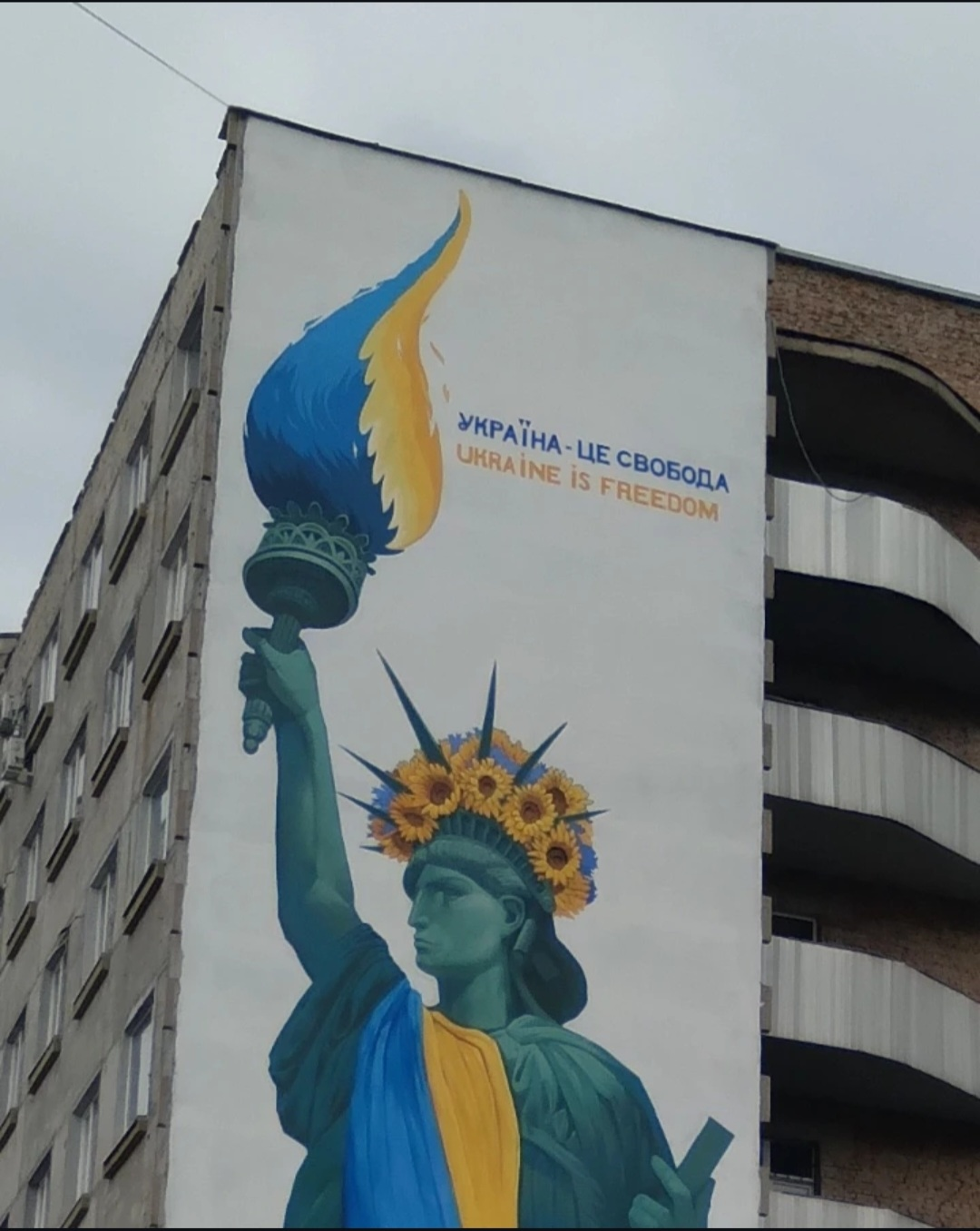
Mural in Kropyvnytskyi, Ukraine

Americanization has become more prevalent since the collapse of the Soviet Union in 1991. Until the late 1980s, the communist press could be counted on to be especially critical of the United States. To some extent, Russia continued that role under Vladimir Putin, and there are similar tendencies in China. Putin in 2013 published an opinion piece in The New York Times that attacked the American tendency to see itself as an exceptional indispensable nation. "It is extremely dangerous," Putin warned, "to encourage people to see themselves as exceptional, whatever the motivation."

A new dimension of anti-Americanism is fear of the pervasiveness of American Internet technology. Americanization has arrived through widespread high-speed Internet and smartphone technology since 2008, with a large fraction of the new apps and hardware being designed in Silicon Valley. In Europe, there is growing concern about excess Americanization through Google, Facebook, Twitter, the iPhone, and Uber, among many other American Internet-based corporations. European governments have increasingly expressed concern about privacy issues, as well as antitrust and taxation issues regarding the new American giants. There is a fear that they are significantly evading taxes and posting information that may violate European privacy laws. The Wall Street Journal in 2015 reported "deep concerns in Europe's highest policy circles about the power of U.S. technology companies."

== Historiography ==
The Americanization of the Navajo at Canyon de Chelly was carried out by the Bureau of Indian Affairs in the late 1800s.

In 1902, the British journalist William Stead used this term in the title of his book, The Americanization of the World, in which he discussed the growing popularity of the "American ideas".

Berghahn (2010) analyzes the debate on the usefulness of the concepts of 'Americanization' and 'Westernization'. He reviews the recent research on the European–American relationship during the Cold War that has dealt with the cultural influence of the United States upon Europe. He then discusses the relevant work on this subject in the fields of economic and business history. Overall, the article tries to show that those who have applied the concept of 'Americanization' to their research on cultural or economic history have been well aware of the complexities of trans-Atlantic relations in this period, whether they were viewed as a two-way exchange or as a process of circulation.

== Criticism ==
Some critics believe that the result of the rivalry between Sinicization and Americanization may lead to the emergence of a third power or turn one of the two into the actor with the most bargaining power. In the midst of this competition, the interests and rights of local businesses may be violated. Others such as Francis Fukuyama argue that the fall of the Berlin Wall in 1989 prompted a unipolar global capitalist reality that meant the "end of history". Some see this as a flawed view, mired in US exceptionalism. John Fousek said "the triumphalism embedded in Francis Fukuyama's view that the end of the Cold War marked the end of history, constitutes a new, historically contingent variation on the ideology that framed conflict in the beginning". Instead Americanisation, in the eyes of Mary Nolan, is not an all consuming force and what emerged during 1990 was "a multipolar global order". Therefore, the actual impact the U.S. and Americanisation has on the globe is hotly debated and runs deep into modern political policymaking. The traditional exceptional image of U.S. complete hegemonic power can be "quite dangerous" because it prompted American intervention in Iraq and Afghanistan, which just like in Vietnam, proved to show the limitations of American power across the globe.

== See also ==
- American culture in the arts and literature
- American cultural history
- American Dream
- American imperialism
- Americanization (immigration)
- Amerika (song)
- Anglicization
- Anti-American sentiment
- American stereotypes
- Americana
- Cocacolonization
- Cultural imperialism
- Debates over Americanization
- Empire of Liberty
- Military globalization
- Neo-colonialism
- Propaganda in the United States
- McDonaldization
- Pax Americana
- Soft Power
- Westernization
- Indigenization
