= Debates over Americanization =

According to The Norton Anthology of American Literature, the term Americanization was coined in the early 1900s and "referred to a concerted movement to turn immigrants into Americans, including classes, programs, and ceremonies focused on American speech, ideals, traditions, and customs, but it was also a broader term used in debates about national identity and a person’s general fitness for citizenship”.

== Historian Frederick Jackson Turner ==
In Frederick Jackson Turner's The Significance of the Frontier, he establishes the frontier thesis, which states that the frontier helped establish the American identity and break away from European influence. In other words, westward expansion was a "steady movement away from the influence of Europe, a steady growth of independence on American lines". The frontier creates the American. Turner states that the wilderness and man battle one another because they are both trying to "master" one another; however, in the end, the wilderness and man reach this equilibrium with each other (they both end up adhering to one another's conditions) which results in the creation of the America.

Arthur Redding writes in his article "Frontier Mythographies: Savagery and Civilization in Frederick Jackson Turner and John Ford” that the language Turner uses to describe this battle between the wilderness and the man is "systematic". The language is scientific and makes "Turner reveal himself as a rigorously Darwinian thinker, as he applies the same systematic approach to explain the evolution of new social and historical species—the American—as Darwin applied to natural history: natural selection and struggle for survival". In other words, the wilderness and man mastering one another is described in a similar sense of “survival of the fittest.” Therefore, the questions to ask would be is who will survive, the wilderness or man? Who is the stronger of the two? In the end, however, the wilderness and man make adjustments to their ways of living. While the wilderness has taught the man to survive, the man has taught the wilderness to be under his control.

Turner states that the greatness of the American frontier is that two key important values for America, tolerance and individualism, are able to thrive. He believed that "so long as free land exists, the opportunity for a competency exists, and economic power secures political power”. The greatness of the American frontier was that different political or religious beliefs could exist without violent conflict. In other words, because the frontier was so vast, it could contain people with various beliefs, and there would be no need for worry about conflict unlike people in a confined space.

However, Turner emphasized that while tolerance and individualism are important and the vastness of the frontier allowed these values to thrive, a downside existed. He believed that these values caused government affairs to not be regulated. As a result, certain evils arose from this lack of accountability. Some of these evils were inflated paper currency and wildcat banking. Inflated paper currency was basically the rise of prices, and wild-cat banking was "uncontrolled banking" and "the giving of nearly worthless currency backed by questionable security". Without regulation, these evils would not be questioned, which was a danger for the success of the America.

The frontier eventually closes and at the end of his essay, Turner reminisces about what the frontier has done for America. Certain qualities such as strength, quickness of the "grasp of material things", and freedom came from the frontier, which defined the American. Americans owe the greatness of the frontier to developing their freedom and strength.

== President Theodore "Teddy" Roosevelt ==
Roosevelt's books, American Ideals and The Strenuous Life are both devoted to not only describing Americans, but Roosevelt also uses his books to describe how Americans should be. "There was scant room for the coward and the weakling in the ranks of the adventurous frontiersmen -- the pioneer settlers who first broke up the wild prairie soil, who first hewed their way into the primeval forest, who guided their white-topped wagons across the endless leagues of Indian-haunted desolation, and explored every remote mountain-chain in the restless quest for metal wealth".

"This country cannot afford to have its sons less than men". Roosevelt was undoubtedly pro-assimilation and expected that all immigrants should turn from their old customs and beliefs and devote themselves wholeheartedly into being American. "He must revere only our flag; not only must it come first, but no other flag should even come second". Roosevelt felt that the Western portion of the United States needed to be subdued and conquered in a war-like manner. This included the land, resources, as well as the Natives of the West. "A record of endless feats of arms, of victory after victory in the ceaseless strife waged against wild man and wild nature".

== Author, Cuban National, and Political Activist José Martí ==
José Martí's Our America challenges many the prevailing ideas on Americanization of the time such as the idea that there should be some American standard that all new citizens need to live up to, that people needed to leave behind the lives and customs they had in the old country and remake themselves anew in America. He calls out those that would shed their past in the name of progress stating "Those carpenters' sons who are ashamed that their fathers are carpenters! Those born in America who are ashamed of the mother who reared them, because she wears an Indian apron, and who disown their sick mother, the scoundrels, abandoning her on her sick bed!”. The idea that Americans need not shed their past but rather embrace it comes up as a repeated theme throughout the essay.

The essay makes the point that to establish an American identity people need to break away from Europe, from its history, its politics, and its culture. Instead, Martí urges Americans to instead to mine the rich history of the Americas. He says, "The history of America, from the Incas to the present must be taught in clear detail and to the letter, even if the archons of Greece are overlooked. Our Greece must take priority over the Greece which is not ours". Here Martí makes the point that for America to succeed it must use the knowledge and history that pertains to it and that European ideas were not formed in America and therefore do not take into account the realities of this American continent.

Martí feels that people should be proud of being American, and not in some jingoistic or nationalistic sense but in the sense of being proud of history of the land and the people that inhabit it. He feels that the struggles that the masses have gone through here on this continent makes America unique among nations, that the common struggle of such disparate people is unique. He writes, "Never in history have such advanced and united nations been forged in so short a time from such disorganized elements". Here the point is made that while being a young country on a young continent America has overcome these obstacles and made itself a world power.

== Author and Political Activist Charles W. Chesnutt ==
Charles W. Chesnutt wrote a literary review of William Hannibal Thomas's The American Negro: What He Was, What He Is, and What He May Become. In his review, "A Defamer of His Race", Chesnutt expresses his frustrations with men like Thomas; mulattos who refuse to claim their heritage and support it. Chesnutt is a mulatto himself and although people perceived him to be white; he claimed his African American heritage. Thomas on the other hand felt that he was clearly white and Chesnutt explains that "he [Thomas] has not had a single friend or well-wisher among the whole eight or ten millions of his own people". Chesnutt continues on to explain how much he despises Thomas's book by pointing out that, the negro has suffered a great deal, in the public estimation, from loose and hasty generalizations [like Thomas' book] with reference to his intelligence, his morals, his physical characteristics, and his social efficiency. But not the worst things said about him by his most radical defamers, all put together, could surpass in untruthfulness and malignity the screed which this alleged reformer has put forth under his publisher's imprint. Thomas was supposed to be assisting the African Americans in gaining respect amongst the white folk but instead he was focused on personal gain.

In an article about Chesnutt, "Neither Fish, Flesh, Nor Fowl: Race and Region in the Writings of Charles W. Chesnutt, Anne Fleischmann, explains a bit about Chesnutt. She explains his mulatto heritage as "not […] a tragic figure emblematic of racial strife but as a testimony to the possibility of racial hybridity". Chesnutt "follows the call for racial uplift and ventures out into what to him is a cultural wilderness". The entire article explains Chesnutt's mulatto views and his influence via literature on the African American culture. He clearly had reason to be upset with Thomas' views.

During the time of Americanization, Chesnutt wanted all individuals regardless of race to be accepted in the new nation. Thomas made it even more difficult because his book is noted as a "review of the history of black Americans and an assessment of the challenges that faced them at the beginning of the twentieth century". Basically, the main character explains that "African Americans will only achieve a desirable standard of living—in both economic and moral sense—through association with and emulation of Anglo-Saxon society". It had an either be white or be doomed sort of message throughout the book. This contradicted everything Chesnutt was working towards and made it harder for Africans to rise up.

== Anna Julia Cooper ==
Anna J. Cooper has an essay, "One Phase of American Literature", which includes an excerpt directed towards W. D. Howells. Howells wrote a book, An Imperative Duty which details the life of a young woman who is considered white until her Aunt explains that she is actually of African descent. The New York Times ran a review of Howell's book, which questioned, "Has or has not Mr. Howells any sympathy with the colored race?”. The article continues explaining that Howells used every black American stereotype he could find and incorporated it into the book. Overall, the article showed a clear disliking to the book.

Anna J. Cooper had similar emotions; she explains, "that it is an insult to humanity and a sin against God to publish any such sweeping generalizations of a race on such meager and superficial information". In a very brief selection, Cooper clearly expresses her dislike for Howell and his book. Her anger is evident through the bashing of Howell for "giving only a half truth and […] a partisan half truth [at that]". Her strong sense of frustration can be understood in an article, "Tending to the Roots: Anna Julia Cooper’s Sociopolitical Thought and Activism", by Kathy L. Glass. Glass explains that "[Cooper crosses] the boundaries of race and sex to court communities from which black women are traditionally excluded, or within which they are routinely marginalized". Cooper had a tough time fighting for individuals of color, especially women, "African American not only had to deal with the oppressive white society but also oppression within their own racial group". Howell was a member of the "white society" so he was her main oppressor but the point is, it is not fair for her life and culture to be interpreted in such a foul manner.

During Americanization, people were looking to be accepted into the white society. This is probably why Howell wrote his book. He wanted to depict an African American being accepted in the white society. Unfortunately, he did it all wrong. Howell took an idea about a culture and ran with it, unfortunately in the wrong direction. Cooper even expresses one of her main concerns being, "there is little point and no force of character about the beautiful and irresponsible young heroine". Cooper was notably a woman with strong values and she fought for all people. It is obvious that Howell's horrid depiction of a young African woman would seriously displease her.

== Humanitarian and Political Activist (Laura) Jane Addams ==
In Twenty Years at Hull-House, Jane Addams documented her belief that Americanization should include services available for all. Her focus was equality for American citizens and foreign immigrants into the United States, and she actively worked to achieve this goal. She originally planned to attend medical school, but her father would not allow it. Instead, she attended Rockford Female Seminary and graduated in 1882. Addams became known for social reform, including housing and sanitation issues, factory inspection, rights of immigrants, women and children, pacifism and the 8-hour day. Addams was Vice President of the National Woman Suffrage Association from 1911 to 1914, campaigned for presidential candidate Teddy Roosevelt in 1912, worked with the Peace Party, helped found and served as president (1919–1935) of the Women's International League for Peace and Freedom, was a founding member of the American Civil Liberties Union (ACLU), and in 1931 she was the first American woman to be awarded the Nobel Peace Prize.

In 1889, Addams co-founded Hull House, a social settlement in Chicago. In addition to shelter, services available at the settlement included food, education, healthcare, and a variety of social activities. Addams based her support of Americanization on the belief that immigrants should embrace their new identity as an American, but should not leave behind their heritage. She reasoned that past experiences, family history, and culture are all a part of who you are. We learn from who we are today and where we came from. Becoming Americanized did not mean reinventing yourself, but rather melding your history with your present and future. Addams suggested immigrants bridge relations between their European and American experiences. American history started long before America declared independence, and part of the Americanization process for early settlers was deciding what practices to retain from their old country, and which ones to adopt in the new. Addams supported the adage, "united we stand, divided we fall". She believed that everyone had something to offer American society, and combining knowledge with skills would create a more united America. She was a proponent for preserving history by recognizing how the past influences progress.
