= Will Thomas =

Will Thomas may refer to:

- Will Thomas (basketball) (born 1986), American basketball player
- Will Thomas (bowls) (born 1954), Welsh lawn and indoor bowler
- Will Thomas (novelist) (born 1958), American novelist
- Will Thomas (born 1998), musician in Sachi

== See also ==
- William Thomas (disambiguation)
