= C. William Thomas =

American accountant

C. William Thomas is an American accountant and currently the Jeb Bush Professor of Accounting at Baylor University, and is also a published author, currently in 482 libraries.
