= Billy Thomas (rugby union) =

- Full name: William James Thomas
- Born: 1 September 1933 Bargoed, Wales
- Died: 7 March 2013 (aged 79) Bedwas, Wales

Rugby union career
- Position: Hooker
International career
Years	Team	Apps	(Points)
1961–63	Wales	2	(0)

William James Thomas (1 September 1933 — 7 March 2013) was a Welsh international rugby union player.

Thomas was born in Bargoed and educated at Lewis School, Pengam.

A hooker, Thomas made 258 appearances in nine seasons with Cardiff and won two Wales caps, debuting against France in Paris during the 1961 Five Nations Championship, then playing the same fixture two years later. He also played for Abertillery, Bargoed and Newport over the course of his career.

== See also ==
- List of Wales national rugby union players
