= Bill Thomas (pitcher) =

American baseball player (1880-1906?)

- Pitcher
- Born: May 1880; Florin, California, U.S.
- Died: May 4, 1906 (aged 25–26)
- Batted: Right Threw: Right

Teams
- Sacramento Senators (1903); Tacoma Tigers (1904–1905); Buffalo Bisons (1906)

William Thomas (May 1880 – May 4, 1906?) was an American baseball pitcher. He was born in Florin, California in May of 1880.

== Professional career ==
Thomas played for the Sacramento Senators, the Tacoma Tigers, and the Buffalo Bisons. He had won 20 or more games in 3 straight years, but was released by the Tigers in 1905.

== Disappearance ==
He dissapeared on May 4, 1906, on a boat bound for Jersey City, New Jersey and was presumed to have drowned. Some theorized he may have been thrown overboard. He had been playing for the Buffalo of the Eastern League at the time and was unmarried. He had been traveling on the New Haven liner Richard Peck at the time of his disappearance. Thomas was said to have "fallen or jumped over." The location of his presumed drowning was near Providence, Rhode Island.
