= William Hannibal Thomas =

American journalist (1843–1935)

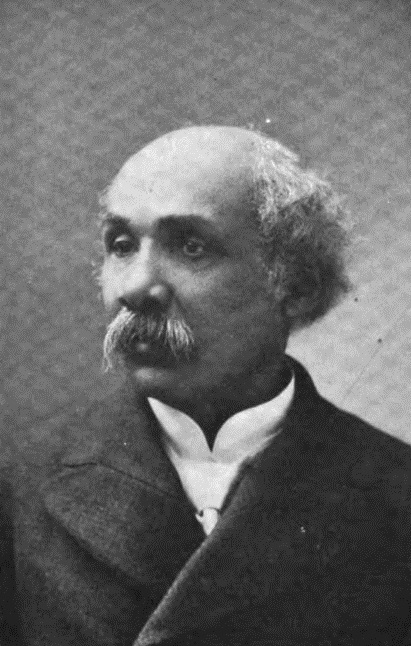
- Born: May 4, 1843; Pickaway County, Ohio
- Died: November 15, 1935 (aged 92); Columbus, Ohio
- Education: Otterbein University; Western Theological Seminary
- Occupations: Teacher, journalist, judge, writer, legislator

William Hannibal Thomas (4 May 1843 – 15 November 1935) was an American teacher, journalist, judge, writer and legislator. He battled racism throughout his life. In 1861, he was rejected entry from the Union's Army until 1863 when he served, and was wounded by gunshot, leading to the amputation of his right arm. He published "Land and Education," in 1890, promoting avenues for Black people to obtain land and largely criticizing white people for troubles brought onto Black people. He garnered heavy attention from the Black community when he published his most famous work, The American Negro, which took a large conceptual leap from his earlier work, shifting failures of the Black community onto themselves.

== Biography ==
=== Early life ===
William Hannibal Thomas was born in Pickaway County, Ohio. His family had been formerly enslaved, although Thomas insisted that "most of his ancestors were white."

In 1859, he was the first black student admitted to Otterbein University. In his own words, "That I contemplated entering the university was generally known, but so far as I recall, no objection from any source was expressed. There was, therefore no reason to believe that my presence in the school would offend in any particular, and, as a matter of fact, I had cordial welcome from my classmates. Nevertheless, in about ten days thereafter a turbulent spirit awoke; a general uprising that swept the sober-minded off their feet took place, and never before nor since has Westerville passed through such an event as was occasioned by my presence in the college; nor did it end there. Meetings were held at which inflammatory speeches were made; I was assaulted on the street; in the classroom the leaves of my books were torn out, and I was, stuck with shawl-pins by those who sat around me; when I passed out of the building groups of waiting students pelted me with rocks hidden in wet snow-balls." Fearing for the stability of the young university, members of the board of trustees offered to pay Thomas' tuition if he were to transfer to Oberlin. Thomas refused to leave Otterbein, even with the threat of being expelled. "That there was substantial ground for uneasiness on the part of the college authorities is fully borne out by the fact that a number of students from Virginia and elsewhere left the school for good the following week. With their departure, however, the excitement subsided as quickly as it had arisen, and I met with no further trouble. Thereafter the students treated me in a manly fashion; each of the literary societies offered membership to me... A significant feature of this experience was the attitude of the young women students toward me, who, with rare exceptions, were uniformly courteous in intercourse; in fact, it was the outspoken words and courageous acts of several of these young ladies, especially one from West Virginia, that effectually held in check the mob spirit of the male students."

Thomas did not return to Otterbein after his first year of studies, and leaves us no indication of his reasons. "When the winter term of the college ended, I left Westerville and spent the summer in farm work. Later on I was employed in running a saw-mill, and when the Civil War broke out I was engaged in teaching school."

He served with distinction in the 5th United States Colored Infantry Regiment during the Civil War of 1861–1865, suffering a gunshot wound that led to the amputation of his right arm. After the war, he attended Western Theological Seminary in Pennsylvania.

The Newberry Observer said that he lived in Newberry County, South Carolina. "Thomas, William Hannibal colored, was a one armed Trial Justice who held hearings in Newberry during the days of radicalism. He had an office upstairs at the western end of Law Range. He was a smart man, a mulatto of good education, a veteran of the Union army. In 1877 a warrant was issue against him and he skipped town. He now lived in Ohio and had written a book about the American Negro. It was very derogatory. Newberry Observer 3/21/1901"

=== Career ===
Thomas wrote correspondence for the A.M.E. Church's national newspaper The Christian Recorder from 1865 to 1870 and published 28 articles during that time. He provided his opinions on black life and issues including religion and politics.

In 1871, he taught for some time and then he earned a license to practice law in South Carolina in 1873. He worked briefly at Wilberforce University in Ohio. He then served as a member of the South Carolina Legislature during the Reconstruction period. During Reconstruction, he was an open advocate for armed Black self-defense against white supremacist violence.

In 1878, President Rutherford B. Hayes appointed Thomas U.S. consul to Portuguese Southwest Africa (now Angola).

Thomas founded his own journal, The Negro. He also wrote The American Negro (1901), a bombastic work published by the Macmillan publishing company. He wrote that it was not skin color but the black population's traits of character and behavior that were the cause of prejudice. "The negro", he wrote, was "an intrinsically inferior type of humanity." He declared that the black individual in America was slowly and steadily deteriorating, and was "immersed in poverty, steeped in ignorance, stifled with immorality, inherently lazy, and a born pilferer." His writings were used by white racists to support their own ideas of "white superiority and black inferiority."

Several black intellectuals such as Booker T. Washington, W.E.B. Du Bois and Charles W. Chesnutt, attacked the author and sought to suppress his book.

== Critics ==
=== Booker T. Washington ===
In response to Thomas's book, The American Negro, Booker T. Washington criticized Thomas in his characterization of Black people and the evidence he provided. Washington started with the assertion that Thomas identifies himself as part of the negro but writes as if he were not apart. Washington rebuts Thomas's claim that Black people have been largely unsuccessful when it came to land ownership with statistics from Virginia and Georgia which showed rise in land ownership from Black people, and that Thomas would have the race rely too heavily on the government to distribute land at the jeopardy of the Black individual's independence. According to Washington, "The author of this book condemns practically every method that has been used for lifting up the negro; everything is wrong except that which he advocates, but which he himself, it seems, has failed to put into practice anywhere in the South. He advocates industrial education all through his book, yet condemns it as it now exists in many negro schools at the South." Washington continued to point out what he believed to be contradictions in Thomas's argument, such as the claim that the negro code did not allow for games involving chance yet later in the argument made claims that a severe character flaw of Black people was their indulgence of gambling. Another contradicting claim Washington pointed out was Thomas's assertion that the low birth rates and high death rates would keep Black people from ever making up a large proportion of the population, but in another argument claims that the negro population is growing by the millions. To Washington, the type of evidence Thomas collected was purely anecdotal and lacked any way to confirm such claims like a name, place, or date. Ultimately, Washington described his and the Black Community's lack of respect for Thomas to come from Thomas's lack of effort to reach out to Black people in the south, and speak to them himself.

=== W.E.B. Du Bois ===
W.E.B. Du Bois largely criticized the tone and characterizations Thomas made in his 1901 book The American Negro, finding most of the evidence dubious at best. Du Bois took interest in Thomas's tone finding the tone of the book to be despairing, describing, "its cynical pessimism, virulent criticisms, vulgar plainness, and glaring self-contradictions." Du Bois claimed that the pressures and stresses of Black life had an effect on Thomas, one that, "tends to develop the criminal or the hypocrite, the cynic or the radical." To Du Bois, Thomas falls in the category of the cynic, and for all that is hopeful in The American Negro, Thomas gives way to despair. Thomas is described as a man that went South during reconstruction to teach the negro everything he needed to know but in a rapid amount of time. He failed and left with his shattered ideal of what the negro was. Du Bois pointed out the editions of Thomas's book, how it started as a pamphlet in 1890, not receiving much attention, before being rewritten into his book in 1901. Despite being rewritten many of the ideas and writing is reused, which Du Bois attributed to what caused the contradictions, as the old ideas written ten years prior are incompatible with Thomas reformed opinions. Some of these differences from the 1901 pamphlet included a reversal of criticism, instead of defending the negro Thomas severely criticized them, and removed much of the blame he attributed to white people in the original pamphlet. Largely Du Bois found the book to be contradictory thematically because the original pamphlet was written with hope, and still had some of those themes left over in the book, but side aside newer themes of scathing critique. While Du Bois accepted that a man can change his opinion in the course of ten years, over the ten years from the pamphlet to the book, Thomas removed himself from the Black community in the south, therefore to Du Bois, the original opinion from the pamphlet held more weight.

=== Death ===
He died in Columbus, Ohio in 1935.

== Bibliography ==
- Land and Education: A Critical and Practical Discussion of the Mental and Physical Needs of the Freedmen. (1890)
  Land and Education is a pamphlet published in 1890 which discusses the issue of black land ownership in the South. In it, Thomas laments the state Black prosperity and suggests Black people pursue industrial education and land ownership. Thomas says this should be done mostly through hard work and effort on the part of Black people, though he also suggests that some aid come from the national government and philanthropy from the Northerners.
- The American Negro: What He Was, What He Is, and What He May Become: A Critical and Practical Discussion. (1901)The American Negro is a book published in 1901 which discusses Thomas' views of Black people and what ought to be done by Black people to uplift them. Among other things, Thomas recommends assimilating as much as possible with white society. He believes that this will help Black people profit in an economic sense as well as a spiritual one. Thomas encourages a Christianity which resembles white worship and discourages worship practices typical of Black communities. The American Negro contains white supremacist messaging and a general distaste for the Black community, especially that of the south, which caused backlash from Thomas' contemporaries.

== See also ==
- Debates over Americanization
