= William Thomas Jr. =

American actor (1947–2020)

- Born: November 8, 1947; Columbus, Ohio, US
- Died: November 14, 2020 (aged 73)
- Occupations: Actor, Minister

William Thomas Jr. (November 8, 1947 – November 14, 2020) was an American actor. From 1991 to 1992, he played Vanessa Huxtable's fiancé Dabnis Brickey on the NBC sitcom The Cosby Show. He also appeared on Broadway, and had roles in several films and television series.

== Career ==
Before coming to Hollywood, he appeared on Broadway in Godspell, Your Arms Are Too Short to Box with God, and as Jacob in the original production of La Cage aux Folles.

In his early television career, Thomas portrayed Cool Charles on the 1987-1988 CBS comedy-drama Frank's Place. He also portrayed Det. William Donald Potts on Steven Bochco's 1990 ABC musical-drama Cop Rock.

From 1991 to 1992, in one of his most well-known roles, Thomas played Vanessa Huxtable's fiancé Dabnis Brickey on the NBC sitcom The Cosby Show, during the eighth and final season. He later played Mr. Laskin on the "My Big Brother" episode of Family Matters, as well as appearing in episodes of The Fresh Prince of Bel-Air, Star Trek: The Next Generation, Home Improvement, Hangin' with Mr. Cooper, and The West Wing. Thomas also appeared on The Bold and the Beautiful in 2005 as an INS agent.

His movie credits included Mambo Kings (1992), Bruce Almighty (2003), and Surviving Christmas (2004).

== Personal life and death ==
Thomas was also an ordained minister. Bill was married to Rev. Dr. Michael Kosik, also a pastor. He died on November 14, 2020 at age 73 after a series of health issues.
