= Kenny Habul =

Australian businessman and racing driver

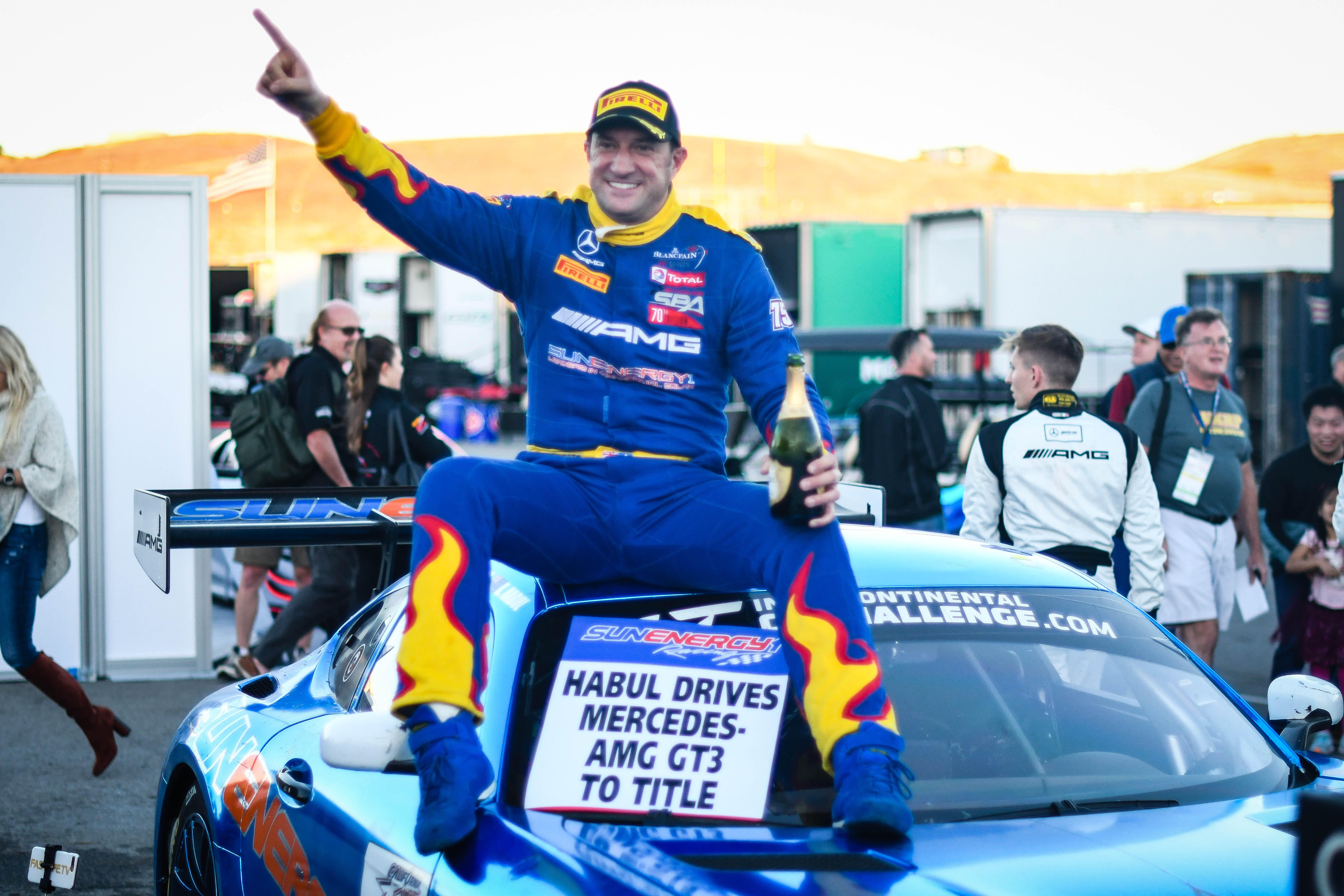
- Habul celebrating the 2018 Intercontinental GT Challenge Bronze Drivers' title at Laguna Seca
- Nationality: (Australia) Australian
- Born: Kenny Charles Edward Habul; 24 May 1973 (age 53) Sydney, New South Wales, Australia
- Categorisation: FIA Bronze
- Achievements: 2018 and 2019 Intercontinental GT Challenge Bronze Drivers' Champion; 2021 and 2022 Intercontinental GT Challenge Pro Am Drivers Champion
- Awards: 2022 and 2023 Bathurst 12 Hour Outright Winner

NASCAR O'Reilly Auto Parts Series career
- 15 races run over 4 years
- 2016 position: 53rd
- Best finish: 44th (2014)
- First race: 2012 Sargento 200 (Road America)
- Last race: 2016 Road America 180 (Road America)
Wins	Top tens	Poles
0	0	0

NASCAR FedEx Freight Truck Series career
- 1 race run over 1 year
- 2013 position: 108th
- First race: 2013 Kroger 250 (Martinsville)
Wins	Top tens	Poles
0	0	0

NASCAR Canada Series career
- 7 races run over 2 years
- Best finish: 27th (2006)
- First race: 2005 ATTO 100 (Toronto)
- Last race: 2006 CASCAR 100 (Montreal)
Wins	Top tens	Poles
0	2	0
- Statistics up to date as of 27 August 2016.

Kenny Charles Edward Habul (born 24 May 1973 in Sydney, Australia) is an Australian racing driver and a businessman. CEO of solar energy provider SunEnergy1, Habul is a two-time winner of the Bathurst 12 Hour and the inaugural Intercontinental GT Challenge Bronze Drivers' champion. Habul also is the founder of motorsports team 75 Express (previously SunEnergy1 Racing) which competes in the IMSA SportsCar Championship and GT World Challenge Australia and the Intercontinental GT Challenge.

== Racing career ==
=== Introduction ===
Habul started his racing career with karting at the age of six. His following career included racing in Formula Ford, Formula 3, V8 Supercars, CASCAR, NASCAR Trucks, NASCAR Xfinity Series and the IMSA WeatherTech SportsCar Championship. He also competed in the 2018 Bathurst 12-hour where he finished second outright. That race was the first in four endurance events for the year that made up the Intercontinental GT Challenge. After Bathurst, he headed to the 24 Hours of Spa-Francorchamps where he claimed another podium in the Bronze Driver class, before sealing a second Bronze driver win at the Suzuka 10 Hours in Japan in August. Habul wrapped up the inaugural Bronze driver title at the final round at Laguna Seca in California in October.

=== Formula Ford ===
In 1998, after spending several years establishing his business career, Habul returned to racing in the Australian Formula Ford championship. The following year, Habul scored his first category podium in a qualifying sprint support race at the Gold Coast Indy 300 on the streets of Surfers Paradise in Queensland. He finished third behind 2014 IndyCar Champion and 2018 Indy 500 winner, Will Power and Bathurst 1000 podium-getter, Steve Owen.

=== Formula 3 ===
In 2002, Habul moved to Formula 3 and competed in support races at the Gold Coast Indy 300. In the following season, Habul contested most of the championship rounds, finishing ninth outright in the national championship.

=== CASCAR ===
After moving to Ontario, Habul began racing stock cars, competing in the CASCAR Super Series. In 2005, Habul contested three rounds of the series recording a best result of tenth. Before the series was purchased by NASCAR in 2007, Habul recorded a career best of third.

=== Xfinity Series ===
After making six starts in the Nationwide Series in 2012 and 2013, in June 2014, Habul announced that he had signed with Joe Gibbs Racing to drive a SunEnergy1-sponsored car in the series' events at Road America and the Mid-Ohio Sports Car Course that year.

Habul joined JR Motorsports in 2016 to compete in the road course races. Additionally, SunEnergy1 sponsored him and Josh Berry in the No. 88 Chevrolet Camaro, while also sponsoring Chase Elliott in the Sprint Cup Series.

=== Camping World Truck Series ===
On 6 April 2013, Habul made his Camping World Truck Series debut with RSS Racing, driving the No. 93 Chevrolet Silverado at Martinsville.

=== WeatherTech SportsCar Championship ===
In 2016, Habul started his own team in the IMSA WeatherTech SportsCar Championship. Driving in the GTD series, Habul started 2017 by winning the pole in his class for the 12 Hours of Sebring.

In 2018, Kabul continued his IMSA campaign by competing in the Rolex 24hr Daytona in January, finishing eighth. For the Belle Isle race, Habul teamed up with Bernd Schneider. The pair finished the weekend in eighth.

=== Intercontinental GT Challenge ===
In 2018, Habul competed in the inaugural Intercontinental GT Challenge Bronze category. He began the season at the Liqui Moly Bathurst 12 Hour in February, finishing on the podium with co-drivers Jamie Whincup, Tristan Vautier, and Raffaele Marciello. At the 24 Hours of Spa he placed 20th overall and third in the Pro-Am class with co-drivers Bernd Schneider, Thomas Jäger, and Martin Konrad.

Later that year, Habul won the Pro-Am class in the Suzuka 10 Hours, finishing tenth overall with Mikaël Grenier and Luca Stolz. The same co-drivers joined him for the season finale at Laguna Seca, where despite spending two hours in the pits for repairs, Habul secured the Bronze Driver Championship with a 27th-place overall finish and fourth in class.

In 2022, Habul won the Bathurst 12 Hour overall with co-drivers Martin Konrad, Luca Stolz, and Jules Gounon.

== Personal life and awards ==
Habul attended Merrimac High School, and then received a law degree from Bond University.

In 2011, North Carolina State House Representative Ruth Samuelson awarded Habul with recognition on behalf of the NC Solar Center. He was also presented with the Energy Leadership Award in 2012 by the Charlotte Business Journal. On 18 December 2010, Habul was commissioned a Palmetto Patriot by the Lieutenant Governor of South Carolina, Andre Bauer. At the same ceremony, Darlington Raceway President Chris Browning and NASCAR Legends David Pearson, Bud Moore, Cale Yarborough and Cotton Owens, all South Carolina natives, were also honoured.

== Music ==
Habul is credited as a co-composer, along with Zac Brown, Niko Moon and Ben Simonetti for the song Your Majesty, which appears as the eighth track on the Zac Brown Band's 2017 album, Welcome Home.

== Philanthropy ==
Habul and SunEnergy1 started a relationship with Feed the Children in 2015 in a drive to provide 1,000 Elizabeth City-area families with food and essentials through the Albemarle Food Pantry.

== Images ==
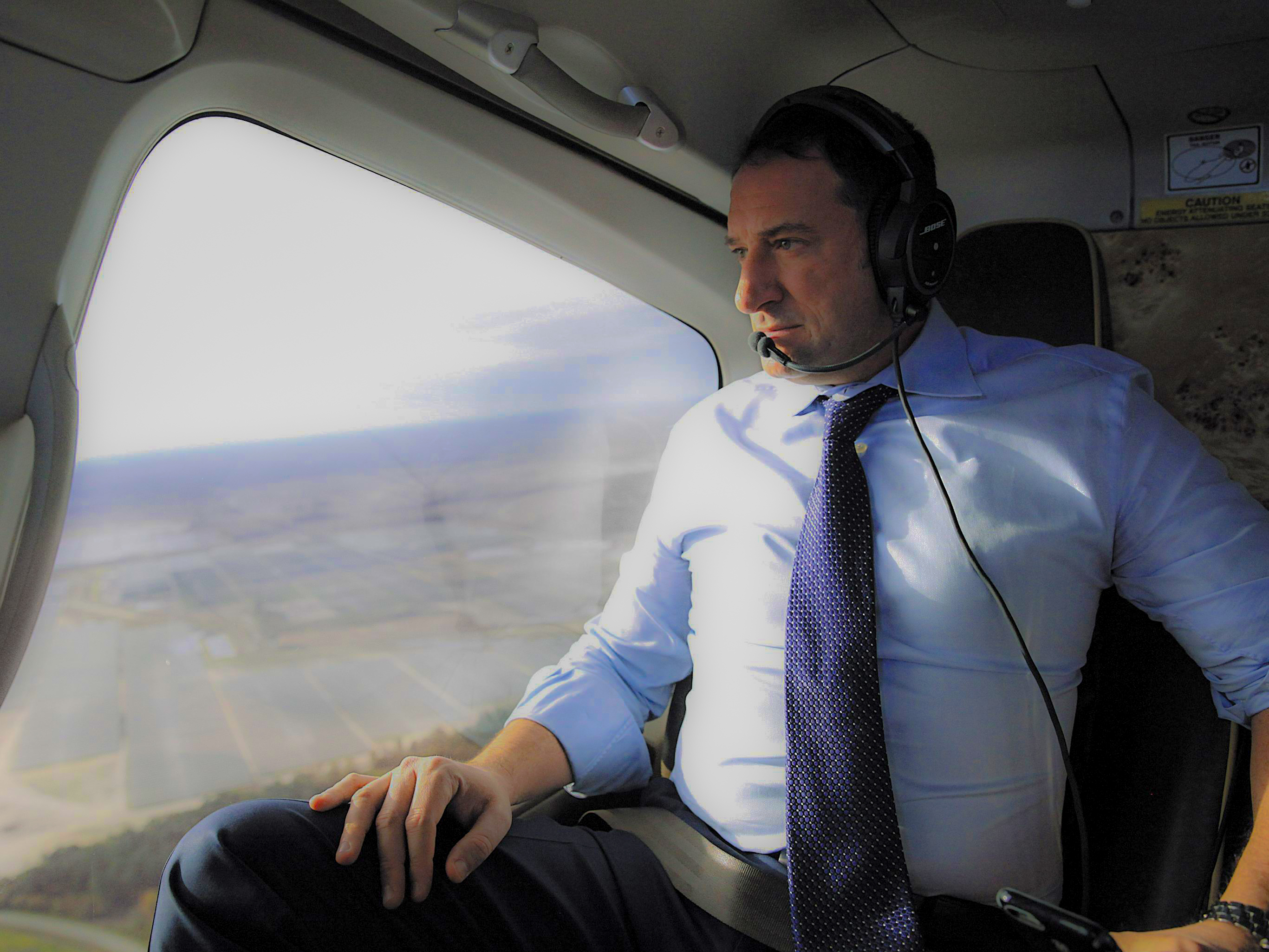

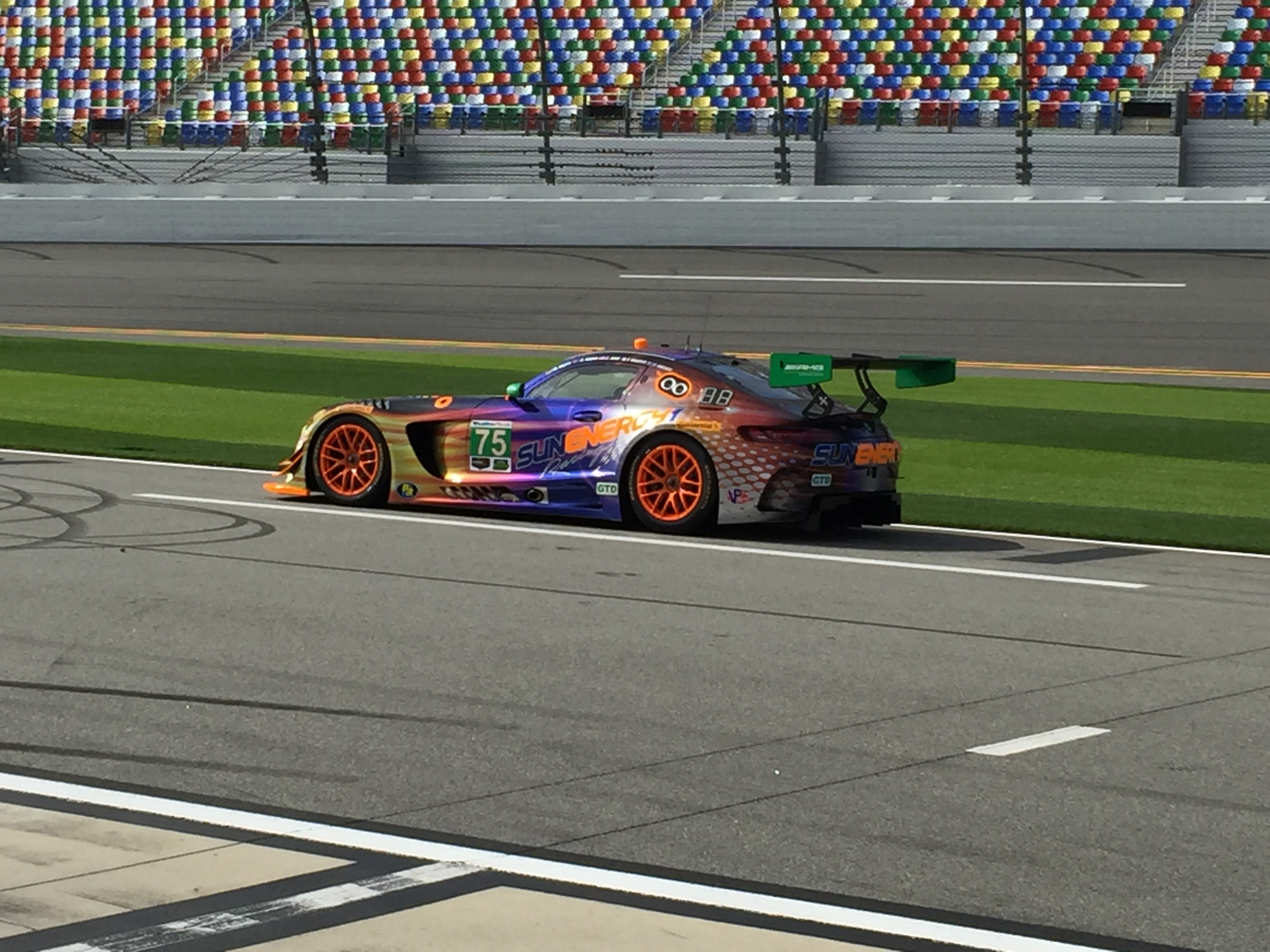
The SunEnergy1 Mercedes Benz at Rolex 24 at Daytona.

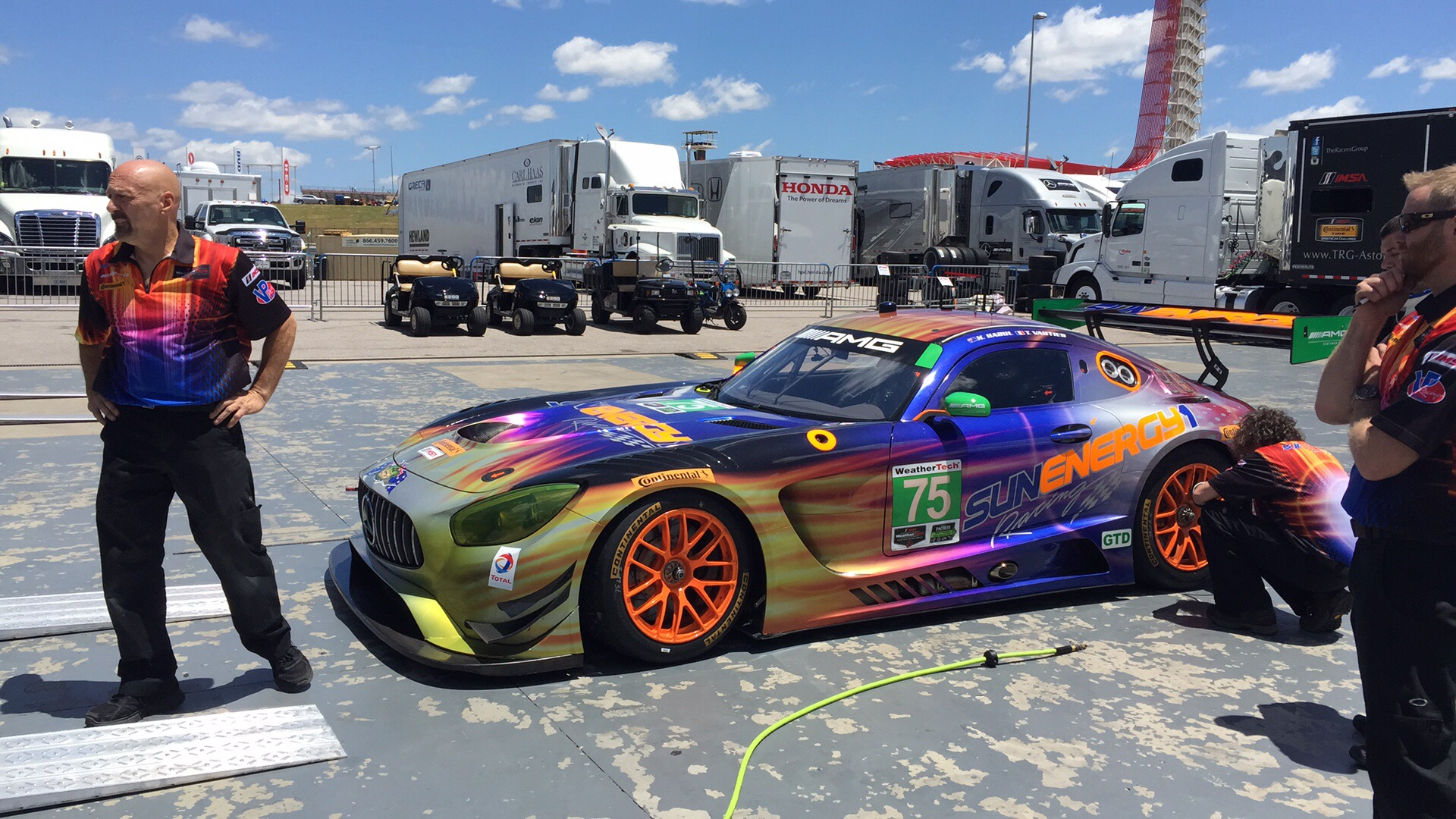
The SunEnergy1 Mercedes Benz at COTA.

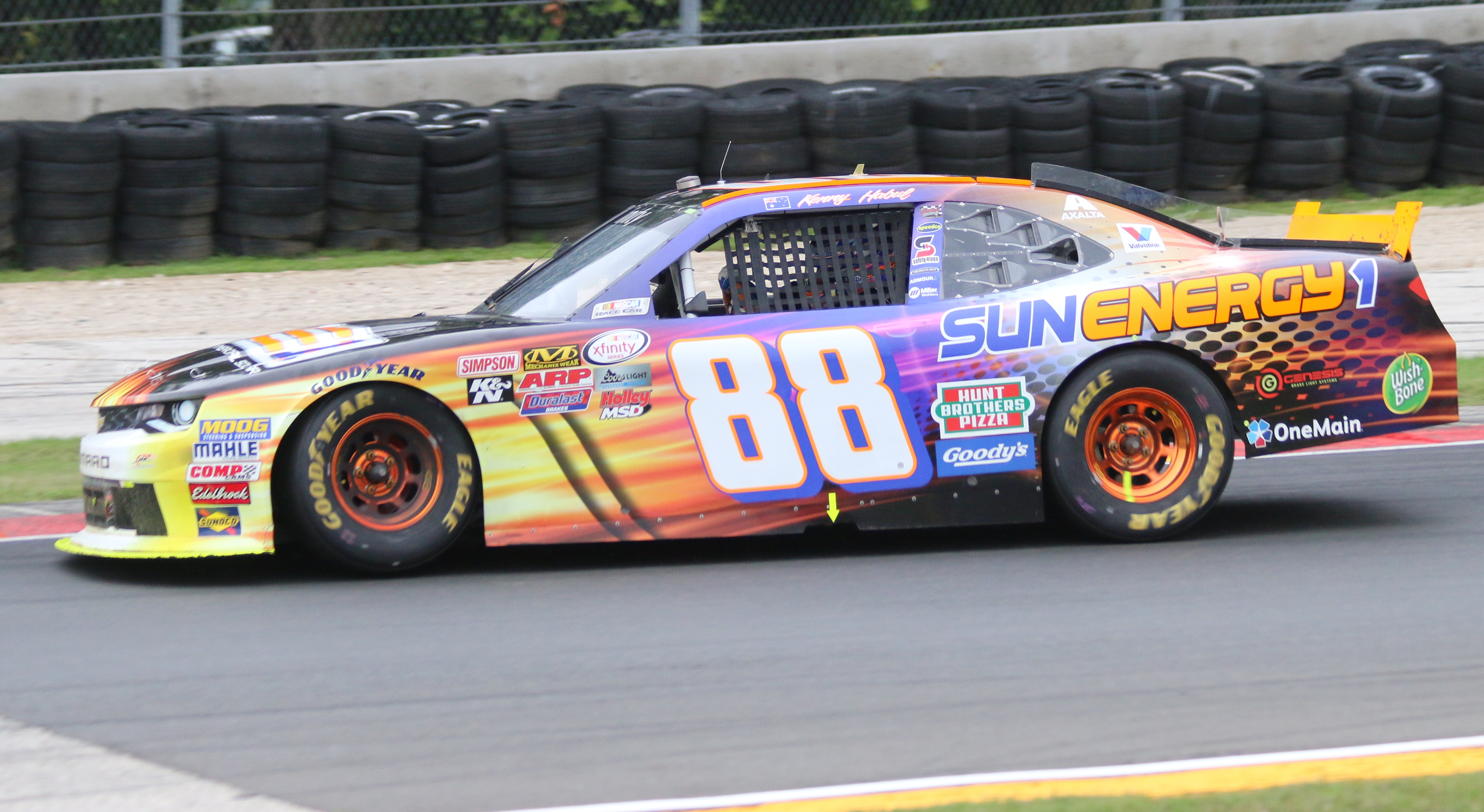
2016 Xfinity Series car at Road America

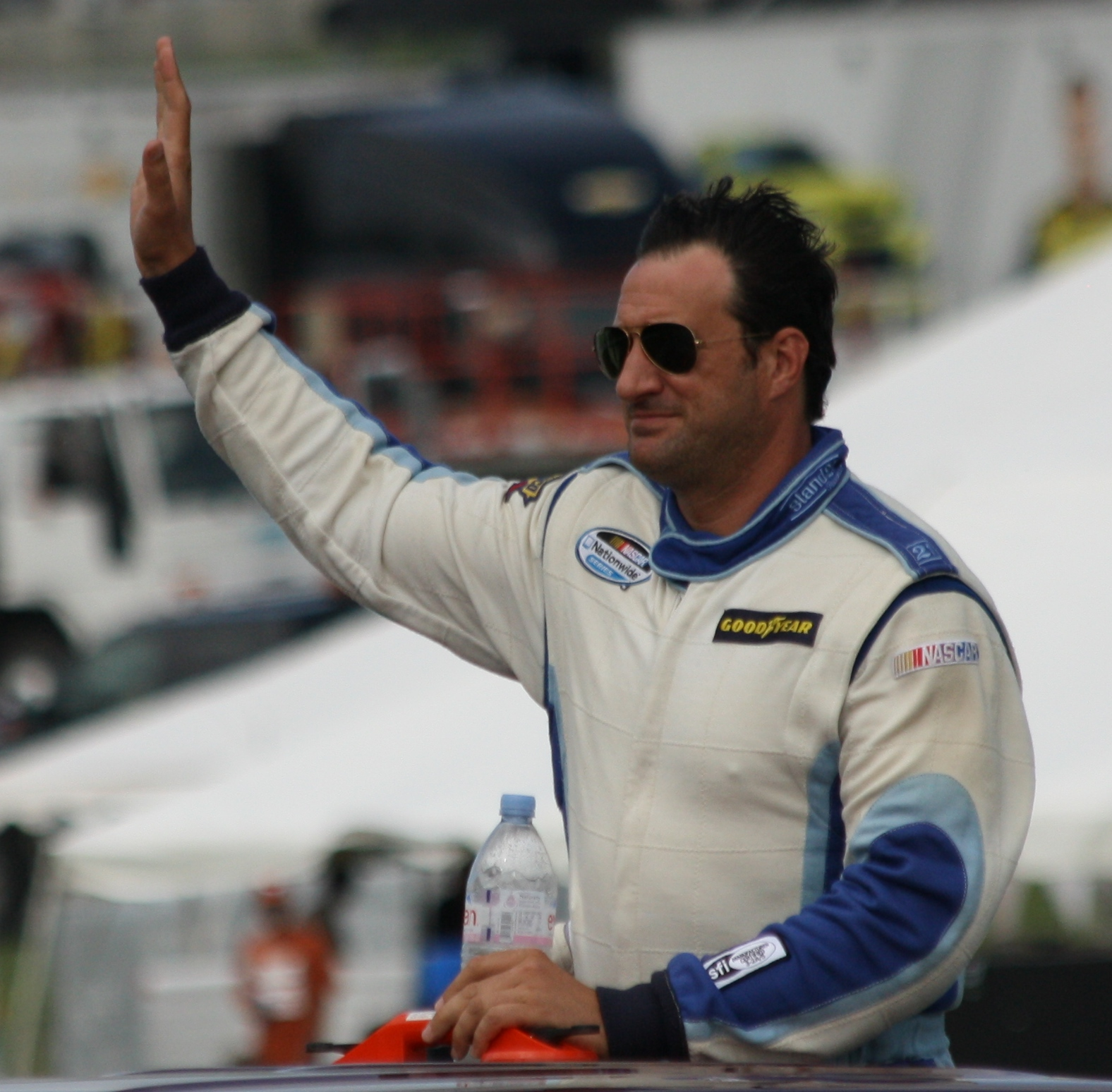
NASCAR driver Kenny Habul at the 2013 Johnsonville Sausage 200 Nationwide race at Road America.

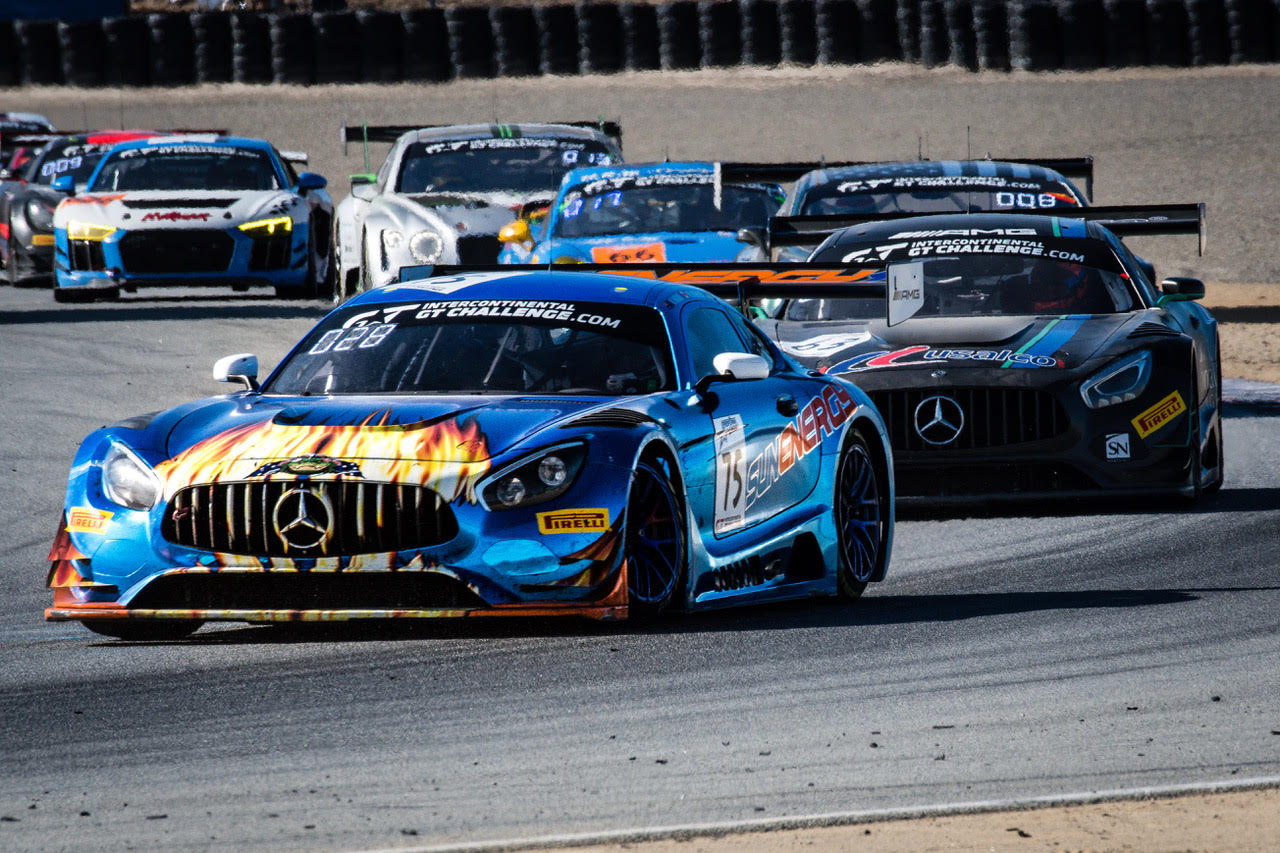
The SunEnergy1 Mercedes-AMG in action

== Motorsports career results ==
=== NASCAR ===
(key) (Bold – Pole position awarded by qualifying time. Italics – Pole position earned by points standings or practice time. * – Most laps led.)

==== Xfinity Series ====
NASCAR Xfinity Series results
Year	Team	No.	Make	1	2	3	4	5	6	7	8	9	10	11	12	13	14	15	16	17	18	19	20	21	22	23	24	25	26	27	28	29	30	31	32	33	NXSC	Pts	Ref
2012	SunEnergy1 Racing	75	Toyota	DAY	PHO	LVS	BRI	CAL	TEX	RCH	TAL	DAR	IOW	CLT	DOV	MCH	ROA; 16	KEN	DAY	NHA	CHI	IND	IOW	GLN; 20	CGV; 34	BRI	ATL	RCH	CHI	KEN	DOV	CLT	KAN	TEX	PHO	HOM	55th	62	
2013	SunEnergy1 Racing	75	Toyota	DAY	PHO	LVS	BRI	CAL	TEX	RCH	TAL	DAR	CLT	DOV	IOW	MCH	ROA; 18	KEN	DAY	NHA	CHI	IND	IOW	GLN; 34	MOH; 26	BRI	ATL	RCH	CHI	KEN	DOV	KAN	CLT	TEX	PHO	HOM	56th	54	
2014	Joe Gibbs Racing	20	Toyota	DAY	PHO	LVS	BRI	CAL	TEX	DAR	RCH	TAL	IOW	CLT	DOV	MCH	ROA; 14	KEN	DAY	NHA	CHI	IND	IOW		MOH; 31	BRI	ATL	RCH	CHI	KEN	DOV	KAN	CLT	TEX	PHO	HOM	44th	61	
2014	SunEnergy1 Racing	75	Toyota																					GLN; 26													44th	61	
2015	Joe Gibbs Racing	20	Toyota	DAY	ATL	LVS	PHO	CAL	TEX	BRI	RCH	TAL	IOW	CLT	DOV	MCH	CHI	DAY	KEN	NHA	IND	IOW	GLN; 29	MOH; 28	BRI	ROA; 14	DAR	RCH	CHI	KEN	DOV	CLT	KAN	TEX	PHO	HOM	49th	61	
2016	JR Motorsports	88	Chevy	DAY	ATL	LVS	PHO	CAL	TEX	BRI	RCH	TAL	DOV	CLT	POC	MCH	IOW	DAY	KEN	NHA	IND	IOW	GLN; 17	MOH; 36	BRI	ROA; 34	DAR	RCH	CHI	KEN	DOV	CLT	KAN	TEX	PHO	HOM	53rd	36	

==== Camping World Truck Series ====
NASCAR Camping World Truck Series results
Year	Team	No.	Make	1	2	3	4	5	6	7	8	9	10	11	12	13	14	15	16	17	18	19	20	21	22	NCWTC	Pts	Ref
2013	SunEnergy1 Racing	93	Toyota	DAY	MAR; 26	CAR	KAN	CLT	DOV	TEX	KEN	IOW	ELD	POC	MCH	BRI	MSP	IOW	CHI	LVS	TAL	MAR	TEX	PHO	HOM	108th	0^{1}	

^{*} Season still in progress
^{1} Ineligible for series points

=== Complete IMSA SportsCar Championship results ===
(key) (Races in bold indicate pole position) (Races in italics indicate fastest lap)

Year	Team	Make	Engine	Class	1	2	3	4	5	6	7	8	9	10	11	12	Pos.	Pts
2016	Stevenson Motorsports	Audi R8 LMS	Audi 5.2 V10	GTD	DAY; 7	SEB	LAG	DET	WGL	MOS	LRP	ROA	VIR	COA	PET		47th	25
2017	SunEnergy1 Racing	Mercedes-AMG GT3	Mercedes-AMG M159 6.2 L V8	GTD	DAY; 18	SEB; 3	LBH	COA; 3	DET; 15	WGL; 15	MOS; 13	LRP	ROA; 12	VIR; 16	LAG; 12	PET; 16	20th	192
2018	SunEnergy1 Racing	Mercedes-AMG GT3	Mercedes-AMG M159 6.2 L V8	GTD	DAY; 8	SEB; 10	MOH; 12	DET; 8	WGL; 8	MOS	LRP	ROA	VIR	LAG	PET		18th	109
2021	SunEnergy1 Racing	Mercedes-AMG GT3 Evo	Mercedes-AMG M159 6.2 L V8	GTD	DAY; 2	SEB; 9	MOH	DET; 10	WGL; 14	WGL	LIM	ELK	LGA	LBH	VIR	PET	30th	778
2022	SunEnergy1	Mercedes-AMG GT3 Evo	Mercedes-AMG M159 6.2 L V8	GTD	DAY; 21	SEB	LBH	LGA	MOH	DET	WGL	MOS	LIM	ELK	VIR	PET	70th	128
2023	SunEnergy1	Mercedes-AMG GT3 Evo	Mercedes-AMG M159 6.2 L V8	GTD	**DAY**; 22	SEB	LBH	MON	WGL	MOS	LIM	ELK	VIR	IMS	PET		68th	125
2024	SunEnergy1 Racing	Mercedes-AMG GT3 Evo	Mercedes-AMG M159 6.2 L V8	GTD Pro	DAY; 13	SEB	LGA	DET	WGL	MOS	ELK	VIR	IMS; 7	ATL			30th	464
2025	75 Express	Mercedes-AMG GT3 Evo	Mercedes-AMG M159 6.2 L V8	GTD Pro	DAY; 15	SEB	LGA	DET	WGL	MOS	ELK	VIR	IMS; 11	ATL			25th	402
2026	75 Express	Mercedes-AMG GT3 Evo	Mercedes-AMG M159 6.2 L V8	GTD Pro	DAY; 2	SEB	LGA	DET	WGL	MOS	ELK	VIR	IMS	PET			32nd	350

*Season still in progress.

=== Complete Bathurst 12 Hour results ===
Year	Team	Co-drivers	Car	Class	Laps	Pos.	Class pos.
2018	(Australia) SunEnergy1 Racing	(Italy) Raffaele Marciello (France) Tristan Vautier (Australia) Jamie Whincup	Mercedes-AMG GT3	Pro	271	**2nd**	**2nd**
2019	(Australia) SunEnergy1 Racing	(Austria) Dominik Baumann (Germany) Thomas Jäger	Mercedes-AMG GT3	Pro-Am	204	DNF	DNF
2020	(Australia) SunEnergy1 Racing	(Austria) Dominik Baumann (Austria) Martin Konrad (Australia) David Reynolds	Mercedes-AMG GT3 Evo	Pro-Am	290	20th	4th
2022	(Australia) SunEnergy1 Racing	(France) Jules Gounon (Austria) Martin Konrad (Germany) Luca Stolz	Mercedes-AMG GT3 Evo	Pro-Am	291	**1st**	**1st**
2023	(Australia) SunEnergy1 Racing	(Andorra) Jules Gounon (Germany) Luca Stolz	Mercedes-AMG GT3 Evo	Pro	323	**1st**	**1st**
2024	(Australia) SunEnergy1 Racing	(France) Jules Gounon (Germany) Luca Stolz	Mercedes-AMG GT3 Evo	Pro	275	**2nd**	**2nd**
2025	(Australia) 75 Express	(Andorra) Jules Gounon (Germany) Luca Stolz	Mercedes-AMG GT3 Evo	Pro	306	**3rd**	**3rd**
2026	(Australia) 75 Express	(Andorra) Jules Gounon (Germany) Luca Stolz	Mercedes-AMG GT3 Evo	Pro	262	7th	5th

=== Complete Blancpain GT Series Sprint Cup results ===
Year	Team	Car	Class	1	2	3	4	5	6	7	8	9	10	Pos.	Pts
2018	SunEnergy1 Racing	Mercedes-AMG GT3	Pro-Am	ZOL; 1	ZOL; 2	BRH; 1	BRH; 2	MIS; 1	MIS; 2	HUN; 1; 15	HUN; 2 DNS	NÜR; 1	NÜR; 2	5th	16.5

=== Complete Intercontinental GT Challenge results ===
Year	Car	Class	1	2	3	4	5	Pos.	Pts
2018	Mercedes-AMG GT3	Bronze	BAT; 2	SPA; 8	SUZ; 10	LUG; 13		1st	83
2019	Mercedes-AMG GT3	Bronze	BAT; Ret	LUG	SPA	SUZ; 12	KYL	1st	25
2020	Mercedes-AMG GT3	Pro-Am	BAT; 13	IND; 9	SPA	SUZ; C	KYL	20th	2
2021	Mercedes-AMG GT3	Pro-Am	BAT; C	SPA	IND; 8	KYL; 7		1st	50
2022	Mercedes-AMG GT3	Pro-Am	BAT; 1	SPA; 28	IND; 7	KYL		1st	65
2023	Mercedes-AMG GT3	Pro	BAT; 1	KYL; 3	SPA	IND	GUL; NC	11th	40
