= 2019 Bathurst 12 Hour =

Endurance auto race in Australia

Layout of the Mount Panorama Circuit

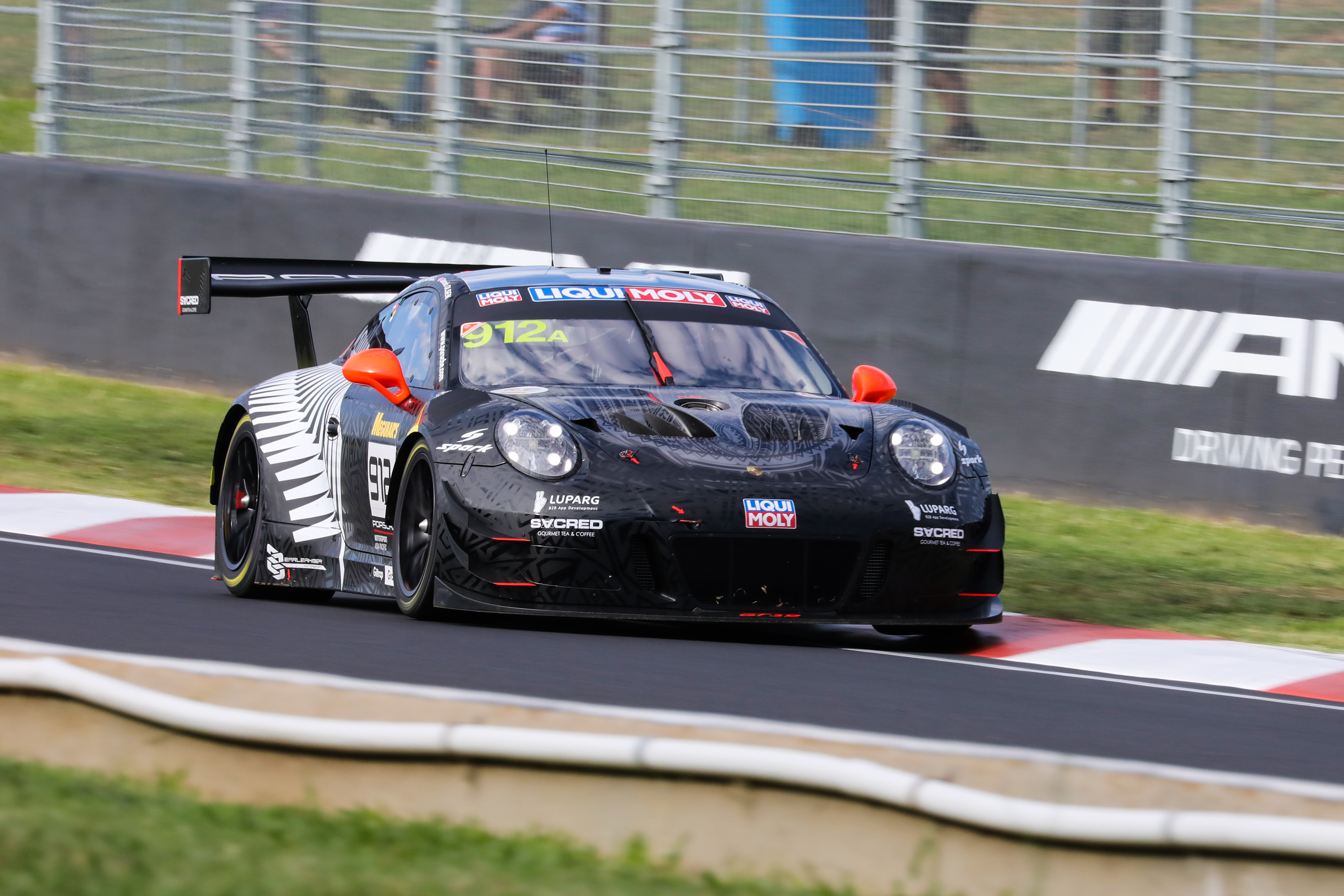
Matt Campbell, Dennis Olsen and Dirk Werner won the race driving a Porsche 911 GT3 R. They also won Class APP.

The 2019 Liqui Moly Bathurst 12 Hour was an endurance race staged on the Mount Panorama Circuit near Bathurst, in New South Wales, Australia on 3 February 2019. The event was open to cars in GT and touring car classes, namely GT3 and GT4. It was the 17th running of the Bathurst 12 Hour, and the opening round of the 2019 Intercontinental GT Challenge.

40 cars were entered and 38 cars started, with two entries withdrawn following crashes in practice.

== Class structure ==
Cars competed in the following four classes.

- Class A – GT3 Outright
  - Class APP (GT3 Pro) – for driver combinations with no unseeded drivers.
  - Class APA (GT3 Pro-Am) – for driver combinations including one unseeded driver.
- Class B – GT3 Cup Cars
- Class C – GT4
- Class I – Invitational

No entries were recorded for Class AAM (GT3 Am) for driver combinations including only FIA Bronze drivers.

== Official results ==
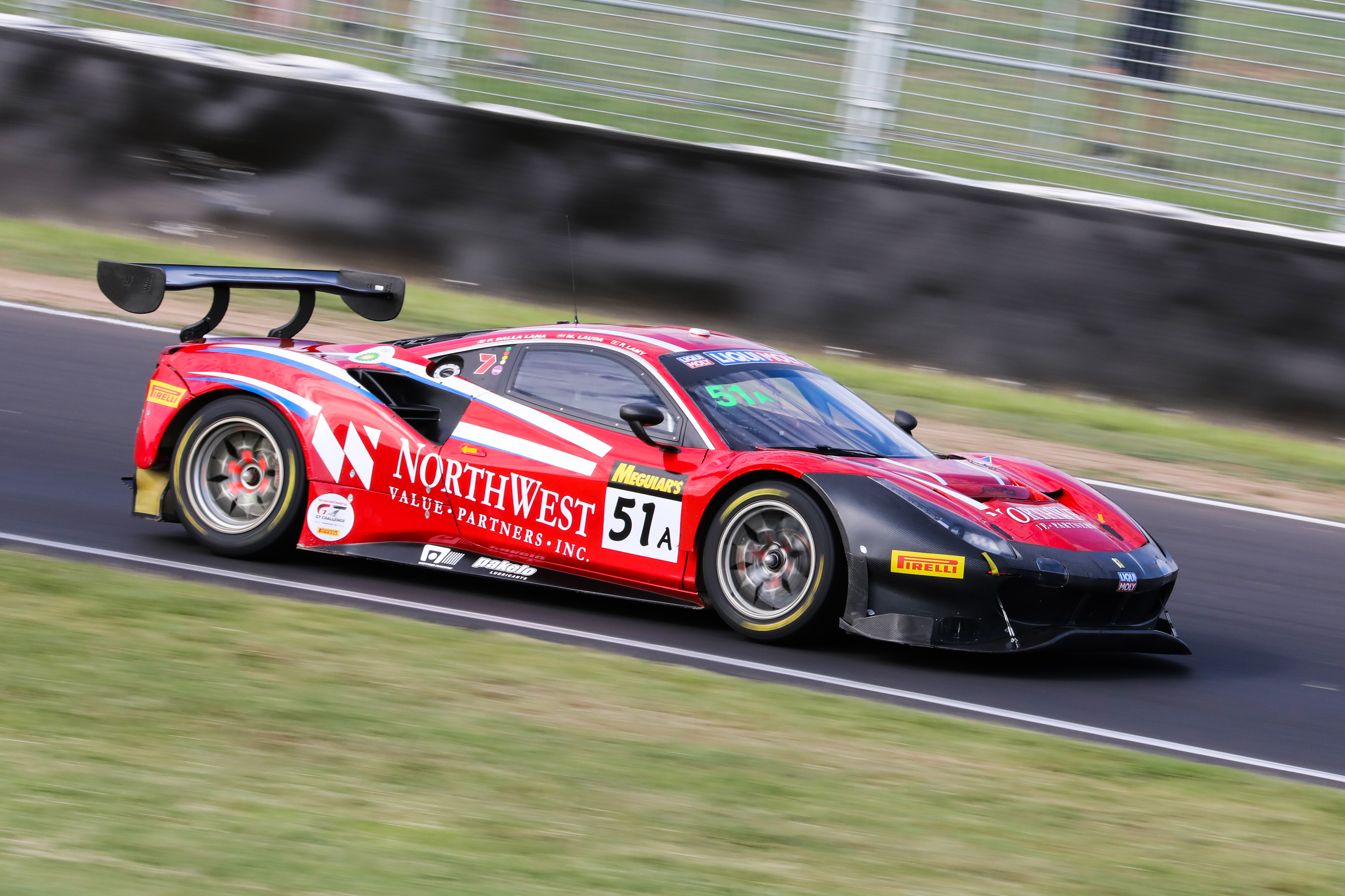
Paul Dalla Lana, Pedro Lamy and Mathias Lauda won Class APA driving a Ferrari 488 GT3.

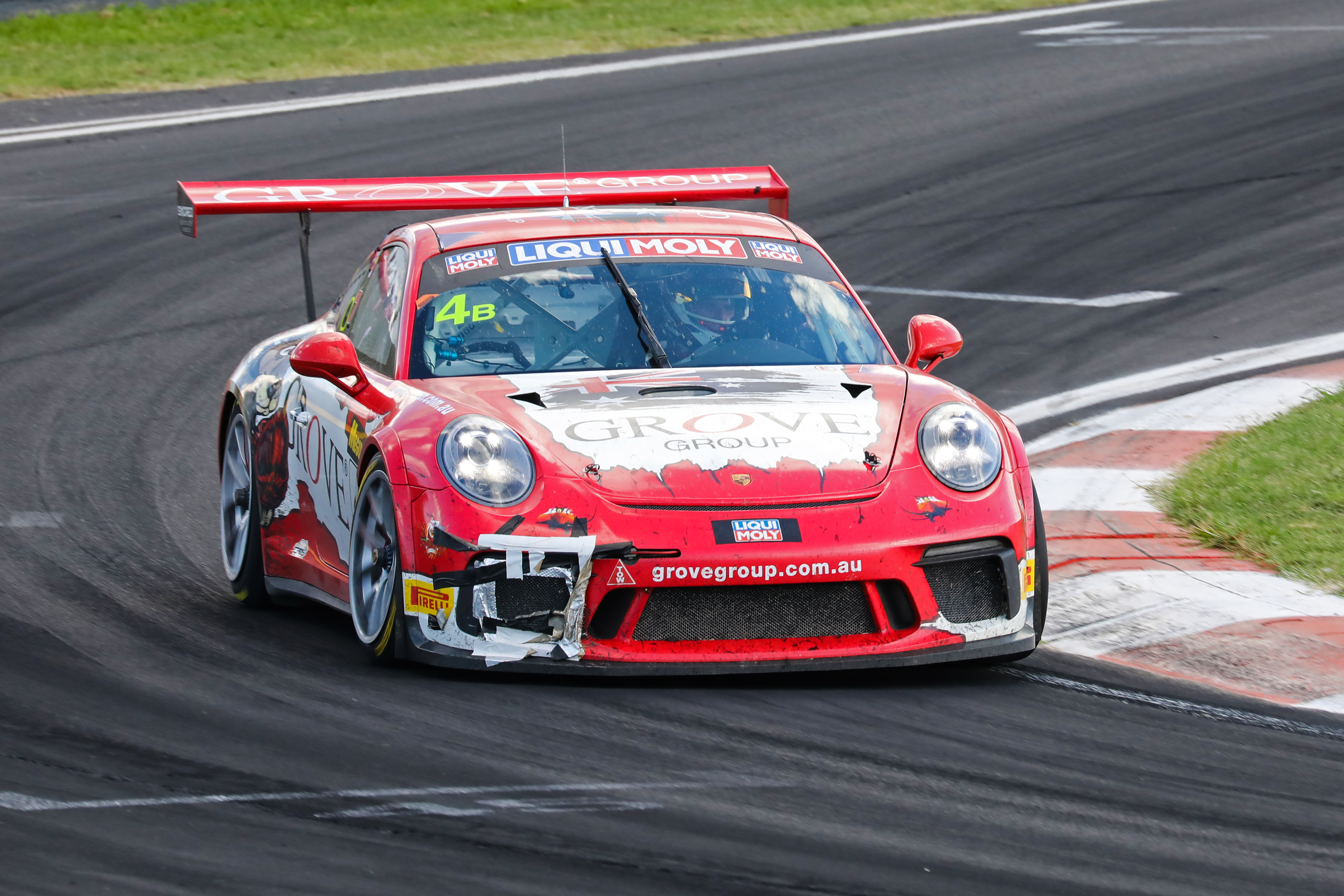
Stephen Grove, Brenton Grove and Ben Barker won Class B driving a Porsche 991 GT3 Cup.

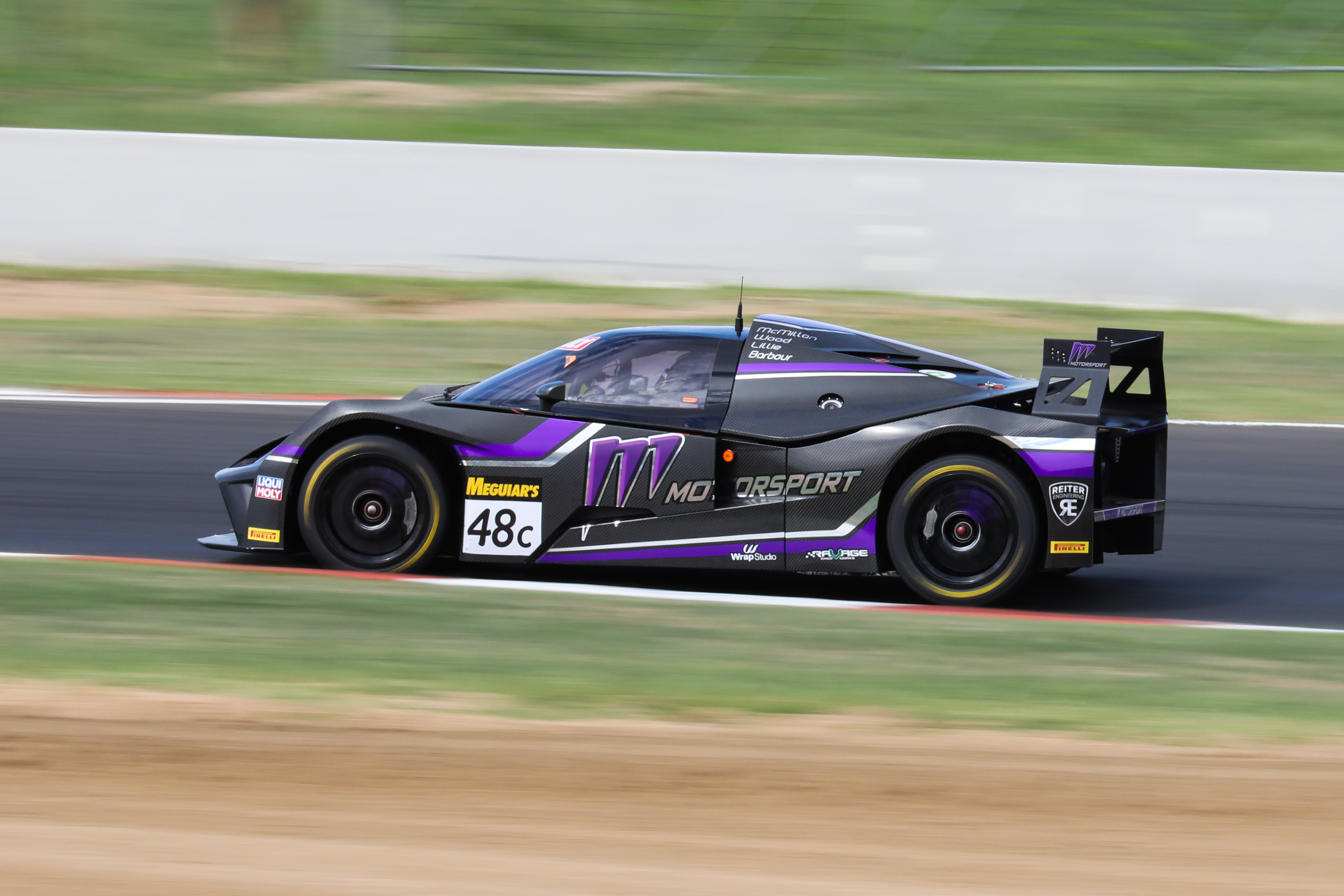
Justin McMillan, Dean Lillie, Glen Wood and Elliot Barbour won Class C driving a KTM X-Bow GT4.

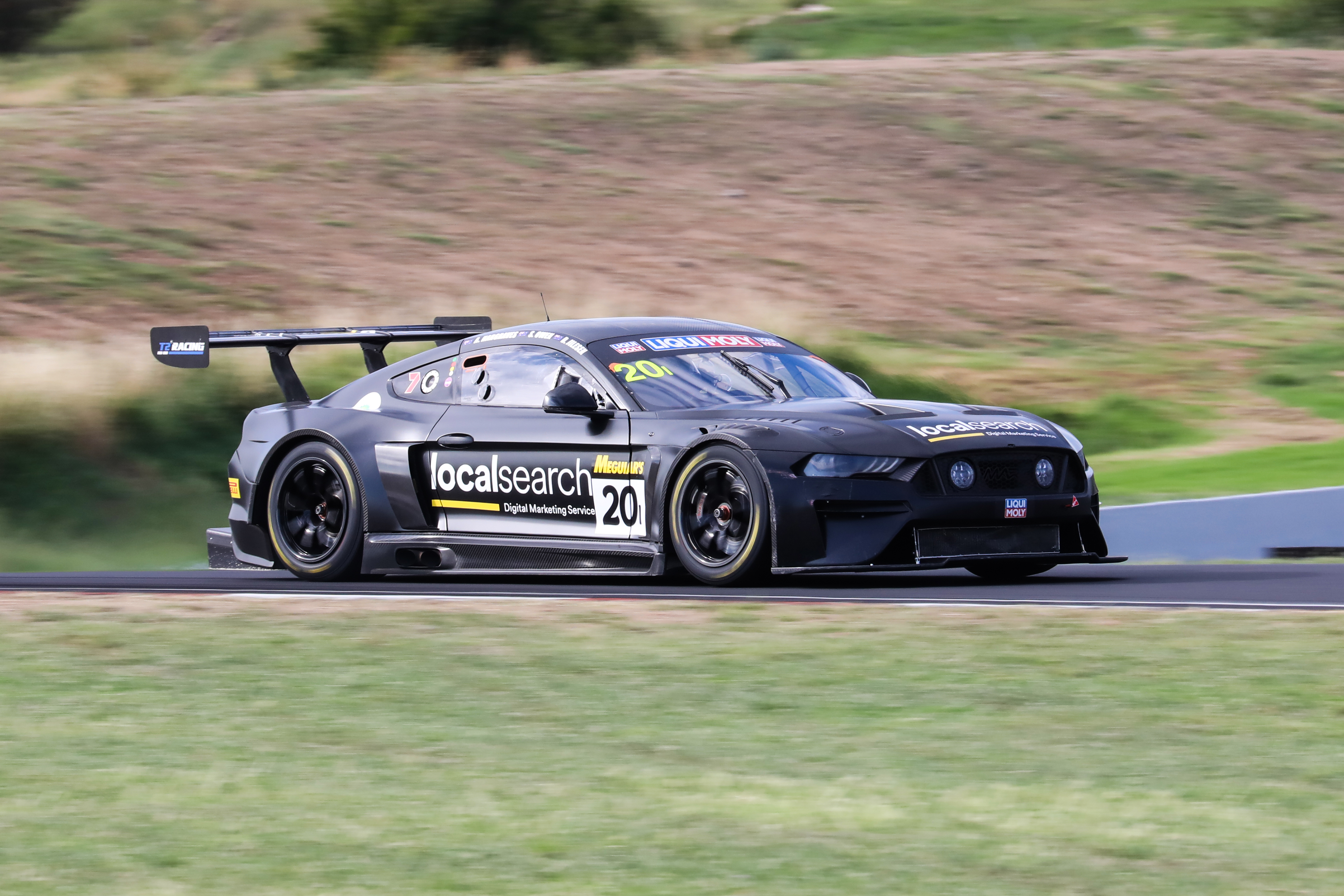
Adam Hargraves, Daniel Jilesen and Steve Owen won Class I driving a MARC II V8.

Bold denotes category winner.

Pos.	Class	No.	Team / Entrant	Drivers	Car	Laps	Time/Retired
Pos.	Class	No.	Team / Entrant	Drivers	Engine	Laps	Time/Retired
1	**APP**	**912**	**(New Zealand) Earl Bamber Motorsport**	**(Australia) Matt Campbell (Norway) Dennis Olsen (Germany) Dirk Werner**	**Porsche 911 GT3 R**	**312**	**12:02:08.4067**
1	**APP**	**912**	**(New Zealand) Earl Bamber Motorsport**	**(Australia) Matt Campbell (Norway) Dennis Olsen (Germany) Dirk Werner**	**4.0 L Porsche H6**	**312**	**12:02:08.4067**
2	APP	62	(Switzerland) R-Motorsport	(United Kingdom) Jake Dennis (Germany) Marvin Kirchhöfer (France) Matthieu Vaxiviere	Aston Martin V12 Vantage GT3	312	+3.4413
2	APP	62	(Switzerland) R-Motorsport	(United Kingdom) Jake Dennis (Germany) Marvin Kirchhöfer (France) Matthieu Vaxiviere	6.0 L Aston Martin V12	312	+3.4413
3	APP	999	(Hong Kong) Mercedes-AMG Team Mann Filter GruppeM Racing	(Germany) Maximilian Buhk (Germany) Maximilian Götz (Italy) Raffaele Marciello	Mercedes-AMG GT3	312	+7.5942
3	APP	999	(Hong Kong) Mercedes-AMG Team Mann Filter GruppeM Racing	(Germany) Maximilian Buhk (Germany) Maximilian Götz (Italy) Raffaele Marciello	6.2 L Mercedes-Benz M159 V8	312	+7.5942
4	APP	888	(Australia) Mercedes-AMG Team Vodafone	(Australia) Jamie Whincup (Australia) Craig Lowndes (New Zealand) Shane van Gisbergen	Mercedes-AMG GT3	312	+7.7984
4	APP	888	(Australia) Mercedes-AMG Team Vodafone	(Australia) Jamie Whincup (Australia) Craig Lowndes (New Zealand) Shane van Gisbergen	6.2 L Mercedes-Benz M159 V8	312	+7.7984
5	APP	42	(Germany) BMW Team Schnitzer	(Brazil) Augusto Farfus (Australia) Chaz Mostert (Germany) Martin Tomczyk	BMW M6 GT3	312	+8.9161
5	APP	42	(Germany) BMW Team Schnitzer	(Brazil) Augusto Farfus (Australia) Chaz Mostert (Germany) Martin Tomczyk	4.4 L S63 BMW twin-turbo V8	312	+8.9161
6	APP	108	(United Kingdom) Bentley Team M-Sport	(Monaco) Vincent Abril (Spain) Andy Soucek (Belgium) Maxime Soulet	Bentley Continental GT3 (2018)	312	+12.5019
6	APP	108	(United Kingdom) Bentley Team M-Sport	(Monaco) Vincent Abril (Spain) Andy Soucek (Belgium) Maxime Soulet	4.0 L Volkswagen twin-turbo V8	312	+12.5019
7	APP	18	(Hong Kong) KCMG	(Switzerland) Alexandre Imperatori (United Kingdom) Oliver Jarvis (Italy) Edoardo Liberati	Nissan GT-R Nismo GT3	312	+51.0909
7	APP	18	(Hong Kong) KCMG	(Switzerland) Alexandre Imperatori (United Kingdom) Oliver Jarvis (Italy) Edoardo Liberati	3.8 L Nissan VR38DETT twin-turbo V6	312	+51.0909
8	APP	107	(United Kingdom) Bentley Team M-Sport	(France) Jules Gounon (United Kingdom) Steven Kane (South Africa) Jordan Pepper	Bentley Continental GT3 (2018)	311	+1 lap
8	APP	107	(United Kingdom) Bentley Team M-Sport	(France) Jules Gounon (United Kingdom) Steven Kane (South Africa) Jordan Pepper	4.0 L Volkswagen twin-turbo V8	311	+1 lap
9	**APA**	**51**	**(Switzerland) Spirit of Race**	**(Canada) Paul Dalla Lana (Portugal) Pedro Lamy (Austria) Mathias Lauda**	**Ferrari 488 GT3**	**310**	**+2 laps**
9	**APA**	**51**	**(Switzerland) Spirit of Race**	**(Canada) Paul Dalla Lana (Portugal) Pedro Lamy (Austria) Mathias Lauda**	**3.9 L Ferrari F154 twin-turbo V8**	**310**	**+2 laps**
10	APA	98	(Australia) Matt Stone Racing	(Australia) Todd Hazelwood (Australia) Roger Lago (Australia) David Russell	Audi R8 LMS	308	+4 laps
10	APA	98	(Australia) Matt Stone Racing	(Australia) Todd Hazelwood (Australia) Roger Lago (Australia) David Russell	5.2 L FSI 2×DOHC Audi V10	308	+4 laps
11	APA	9	(Australia) Hallmarc Racing	(Australia) Marc Cini (Australia) Dean Fiore (Australia) Lee Holdsworth	Audi R8 LMS	307	+5 laps
11	APA	9	(Australia) Hallmarc Racing	(Australia) Marc Cini (Australia) Dean Fiore (Australia) Lee Holdsworth	5.2 L FSI 2×DOHC Audi V10	307	+5 laps
12	APA	6	(Australia) Wall Racing	(Australia) Adrian Deitz (Australia) Tony D'Alberto (Australia) Cameron McConville (United Kingdom) Jules Westwood	Lamborghini Huracán GT3	307	+5 laps
12	APA	6	(Australia) Wall Racing	(Australia) Adrian Deitz (Australia) Tony D'Alberto (Australia) Cameron McConville (United Kingdom) Jules Westwood	5.2 L Lamborghini V10	307	+5 laps
13	APA	19	(Germany) Mercedes-AMG Team Nineteen Corp Black Falcon	(Australia) Mark Griffith (Netherlands) Yelmer Buurman (Denmark) Christina Nielsen	Mercedes-AMG GT3	306	+6 laps
13	APA	19	(Germany) Mercedes-AMG Team Nineteen Corp Black Falcon	(Australia) Mark Griffith (Netherlands) Yelmer Buurman (Denmark) Christina Nielsen	6.2 L Mercedes-Benz M159 V8	306	+6 laps
14	APP	2	(Australia) Audi Sport Team Valvoline	(Germany) Christopher Haase (Germany) Christopher Mies (Germany) Markus Winkelhock	Audi R8 LMS	304	+8 laps
14	APP	2	(Australia) Audi Sport Team Valvoline	(Germany) Christopher Haase (Germany) Christopher Mies (Germany) Markus Winkelhock	5.2 L FSI 2×DOHC Audi V10	304	+8 laps
15	APP	35	(Hong Kong) KCMG	(Australia) Josh Burdon (Japan) Katsumasa Chiyo (Japan) Tsugio Matsuda	Nissan GT-R Nismo GT3	301	+11 laps
15	APP	35	(Hong Kong) KCMG	(Australia) Josh Burdon (Japan) Katsumasa Chiyo (Japan) Tsugio Matsuda	3.8 L Nissan VR38DETT twin-turbo V6	301	+11 laps
16	**B**	**4**	**(Australia) Grove Racing**	**(Australia) Stephen Grove (Australia) Brenton Grove (United Kingdom) Ben Barker**	**Porsche 991 GT3 Cup**	**299**	**+13 laps**
16	**B**	**4**	**(Australia) Grove Racing**	**(Australia) Stephen Grove (Australia) Brenton Grove (United Kingdom) Ben Barker**	**3.8 L Porsche H6**	**299**	**+13 laps**
17	**I**	**20**	**(Australia) T2 Racing by Liajen Motorsport**	**(Australia) Adam Hargraves (New Zealand) Daniel Jilesen (Australia) Steve Owen**	**MARC II V8**	**282**	**+30 laps**
17	**I**	**20**	**(Australia) T2 Racing by Liajen Motorsport**	**(Australia) Adam Hargraves (New Zealand) Daniel Jilesen (Australia) Steve Owen**	**5.2 L Ford Coyote V8**	**282**	**+30 laps**
18	APP	27	(Taiwan) HubAuto Corsa	(Australia) Nick Foster (Australia) Nick Percat (Australia) Tim Slade	Ferrari 488 GT3	279	+33 laps
18	APP	27	(Taiwan) HubAuto Corsa	(Australia) Nick Foster (Australia) Nick Percat (Australia) Tim Slade	3.9 L Ferrari F154 twin-turbo V8	279	+33 laps
19	B	23	(Singapore) Team Carrera Cup Asia	(New Zealand) Chris van der Drift (Australia) Paul Tressider (China) Bao Jinlong (Germany) Philip Hamprecht	Porsche 991 GT3 Cup	279	+33 laps
19	B	23	(Singapore) Team Carrera Cup Asia	(New Zealand) Chris van der Drift (Australia) Paul Tressider (China) Bao Jinlong (Germany) Philip Hamprecht	3.8 L Porsche H6	279	+33 laps
20	**C**	**48**	**(Australia) M Motorsport**	**(Australia) Justin McMillan (Australia) Dean Lillie (Australia) Glen Wood (Australia) Elliott Barbour**	**KTM X-Bow GT4**	**278**	**+34 laps**
20	**C**	**48**	**(Australia) M Motorsport**	**(Australia) Justin McMillan (Australia) Dean Lillie (Australia) Glen Wood (Australia) Elliott Barbour**	**2.0 L Audi 16v TFSI turbocharged I4**	**278**	**+34 laps**
21	C	13	(United States) RHC Jorgensen-Strom; MARC Cars Australia	(United States) Daren Jorgensen (United States) Brett Strom (Australia) Gerard McLeod	BMW M4 GT4	277	+35 laps
21	C	13	(United States) RHC Jorgensen-Strom; MARC Cars Australia	(United States) Daren Jorgensen (United States) Brett Strom (Australia) Gerard McLeod	3.0 L BMW N55 twin-turbo I6	277	+35 laps
22	C	55	Ginetta Australia	(Australia) Aaron Love (Australia) Jimmy Vernon (Australia) Brad Schumacher (Australia) Karl Reindler	Ginetta G55 GT4	266	+46 laps
22	C	55	Ginetta Australia	(Australia) Aaron Love (Australia) Jimmy Vernon (Australia) Brad Schumacher (Australia) Karl Reindler	3.7 L Ford Cyclone V6	266	+46 laps
23	APA	11	(Australia) Objective Racing	(Australia) Tony Walls (Australia) Warren Luff (United Kingdom) Andrew Watson	McLaren 650S GT3	260	+52 laps
23	APA	11	(Australia) Objective Racing	(Australia) Tony Walls (Australia) Warren Luff (United Kingdom) Andrew Watson	3.8 L McLaren M838T twin-turbo V8	260	+52 laps
DNF	C	50	(Australia) M Motorsport	(Australia) David Crampton (Australia) Trent Harrison (Australia) Tim Macrow (Australia) Caitlin Wood	KTM X-Bow GT4	262	Engine
DNF	C	50	(Australia) M Motorsport	(Australia) David Crampton (Australia) Trent Harrison (Australia) Tim Macrow (Australia) Caitlin Wood	2.0 L Audi 16v TFSI turbocharged I4	262	Engine
DNF	APP	911	(New Zealand) Earl Bamber Motorsport	(France) Romain Dumas (France) Mathieu Jaminet (Germany) Sven Müller	Porsche 911 GT3 R	234	Steering
DNF	APP	911	(New Zealand) Earl Bamber Motorsport	(France) Romain Dumas (France) Mathieu Jaminet (Germany) Sven Müller	4.0 L Porsche H6	234	Steering
DNF	APA	75	(United States) STM - SunEnergy1 Racing	(Australia) Kenny Habul (Austria) Dominik Baumann (Germany) Thomas Jäger	Mercedes-AMG GT3	204	Radiator damage
DNF	APA	75	(United States) STM - SunEnergy1 Racing	(Australia) Kenny Habul (Austria) Dominik Baumann (Germany) Thomas Jäger	6.2 L Mercedes-Benz M159 V8	204	Radiator damage
NC	C	71	(Australia) M Motorsport	(Australia) Dean Koutsoumidis (Australia) Jake Parsons (United Kingdom) James Winslow (Switzerland) Mathias Beche	KTM X-Bow GT4	196	Not Classified
NC	C	71	(Australia) M Motorsport	(Australia) Dean Koutsoumidis (Australia) Jake Parsons (United Kingdom) James Winslow (Switzerland) Mathias Beche	2.0 L Audi 16v TFSI turbocharged I4	196	Not Classified
DNF	I	91	MARC Cars Australia	(Papua New Guinea) Keith Kassulke (Australia) Paul Morris (Canada) Paul Tracy (Australia) Anton de Pasquale	MARC II V8	189	Engine
DNF	I	91	MARC Cars Australia	(Papua New Guinea) Keith Kassulke (Australia) Paul Morris (Canada) Paul Tracy (Australia) Anton de Pasquale	5.2 L Ford Coyote V8	189	Engine
DNF	APP	77	(Hong Kong) Mercedes-AMG Team Craft Bamboo Black Falcon	(Germany) Maro Engel (United Kingdom) Gary Paffett (Germany) Luca Stolz	Mercedes-AMG GT3	185	Overheating
DNF	APP	77	(Hong Kong) Mercedes-AMG Team Craft Bamboo Black Falcon	(Germany) Maro Engel (United Kingdom) Gary Paffett (Germany) Luca Stolz	6.2 L Mercedes-Benz M159 V8	185	Overheating
DNF	APP	22	(Australia) Audi Sport Team Valvoline	(Australia) Garth Tander (South Africa) Kelvin van der Linde (Belgium) Frédéric Vervisch	Audi R8 LMS	181	Crash
DNF	APP	22	(Australia) Audi Sport Team Valvoline	(Australia) Garth Tander (South Africa) Kelvin van der Linde (Belgium) Frédéric Vervisch	5.2 L FSI 2×DOHC Audi V10	181	Crash
DNF	APA	29	(Australia) Trofeo Motorsport	(Australia) Jim Manolios (Italy) Ivan Capelli (Australia) Ben Porter (Australia) Dean Canto	Lamborghini Huracán GT3	178	Engine
DNF	APA	29	(Australia) Trofeo Motorsport	(Australia) Jim Manolios (Italy) Ivan Capelli (Australia) Ben Porter (Australia) Dean Canto	5.2 L Lamborghini V10	178	Engine
NC	APA	760	(Switzerland) R-Motorsport	(Switzerland) Andreas Bänziger (Austria) Florian Kamelger (Australia) Peter Leemhuis (United Kingdom) Matt Parry	Aston Martin V12 Vantage GT3	168	Not Classified
NC	APA	760	(Switzerland) R-Motorsport	(Switzerland) Andreas Bänziger (Austria) Florian Kamelger (Australia) Peter Leemhuis (United Kingdom) Matt Parry	6.0 L Aston Martin V12	168	Not Classified
DNF	APA	777	(Australia) STM - Erebus Motorsport	(Australia) Yasser Shahin (Australia) David Reynolds (Australia) Luke Youlden	Mercedes-AMG GT3	156	Overheating
DNF	APA	777	(Australia) STM - Erebus Motorsport	(Australia) Yasser Shahin (Australia) David Reynolds (Australia) Luke Youlden	6.2 L Mercedes-Benz M159 V8	156	Overheating
DNF	I	92	(Australia) Liajen Motorsport	(Australia) Geoff Taunton (Australia) Jason Busk (Australia) Dylan O'Keeffe	MARC Ford Focus V8	136	Driveline
DNF	I	92	(Australia) Liajen Motorsport	(Australia) Geoff Taunton (Australia) Jason Busk (Australia) Dylan O'Keeffe	5.0 L Ford Coyote V8	136	Driveline
DNF	B	43	(Australia) Ashley Seward Motorsport	(New Zealand) Sam Fillmore (Australia) Richard Muscat (Australia) Danny Stutterd	Porsche 991 GT3 Cup	134	Crash
DNF	B	43	(Australia) Ashley Seward Motorsport	(New Zealand) Sam Fillmore (Australia) Richard Muscat (Australia) Danny Stutterd	3.8 L Porsche H6	134	Crash
DNF	I	96	MARC Cars Australia	(Australia) Hadrian Morrall (Netherlands) Mathijs Bakker (Norway) Einar Thorsen	MARC Ford Focus V8	44	Crash
DNF	I	96	MARC Cars Australia	(Australia) Hadrian Morrall (Netherlands) Mathijs Bakker (Norway) Einar Thorsen	5.0 L Ford Coyote V8	44	Crash
DNF	APA	12	(United States) Competition Motorsports (Australia) McElrea Racing	(Australia) David Calvert-Jones (France) Kévin Estre (New Zealand) Jaxon Evans	Porsche 911 GT3 R	37	Crash
DNF	APA	12	(United States) Competition Motorsports (Australia) McElrea Racing	(Australia) David Calvert-Jones (France) Kévin Estre (New Zealand) Jaxon Evans	4.0 L Porsche H6	37	Crash
DNF	APP	34	(Germany) Walkenhorst Motorsport	(Netherlands) Nick Catsburg (Denmark) Mikkel Jensen (Norway) Christian Krognes	BMW M6 GT3	28	Oil Pressure
DNF	APP	34	(Germany) Walkenhorst Motorsport	(Netherlands) Nick Catsburg (Denmark) Mikkel Jensen (Norway) Christian Krognes	4.4 L S63 BMW twin-turbo V8	28	Oil Pressure
DNS	APA	3	(Australia) Melbourne Performance Centre	(United Kingdom) Matt Neal (United Kingdom) Gordon Shedden (United Kingdom) Pete Storey	Audi R8 LMS		Crash in Practice 2
DNS	APA	3	(Australia) Melbourne Performance Centre	(United Kingdom) Matt Neal (United Kingdom) Gordon Shedden (United Kingdom) Pete Storey	5.2 L FSI 2×DOHC Audi V10		Crash in Practice 2
DNS	APA	540	(United States) Black Swan Racing	(Netherlands) Jeroen Bleekemolen (Germany) Marc Lieb (United States) Tim Pappas	Porsche 911 GT3 R		Crash in Practice 2
DNS	APA	540	(United States) Black Swan Racing	(Netherlands) Jeroen Bleekemolen (Germany) Marc Lieb (United States) Tim Pappas	4.0 L Porsche H6		Crash in Practice 2

- Race time of winning car: 12:02:08.4067
- Race distance of cars on the leaders lap: 1,204.632 mi (1,938.667 km)
- Fastest race lap: 2:03.5382 – Josh Burdon on lap 300

Intercontinental GT Challenge
Previous race: none	2019 season	Next race: California 8 Hours
