= 2016 Hisense 4K TV 300 =

11th race of the 2016 NASCAR Xfinity Series

Race details
- Race 16 of 33 in the 2016 NASCAR Xfinity Series
- Date: May 28, 2016
- Location: Charlotte Motor Speedway in Charlotte, North Carolina
- Course: Permanent racing facility
- Course length: 1.5 miles (2.41 km)
- Distance: 200 laps, 300 mi (482.8 km)
- Average speed: 114.515 miles per hour (184.294 km/h)

Pole position
Driver	Erik Jones	Joe Gibbs Racing
- Time: 29.261

Most laps led
Driver	Denny Hamlin	Joe Gibbs Racing
- Laps: 76

Winner
No. 18	Denny Hamlin	Joe Gibbs Racing

Television in the United States
- Network: FS1
- Announcers: Adam Alexander, Clint Bowyer, Michael Waltrip

Radio in the United States
- Radio: PRN

The 2016 Hisense 4K TV 300 was the 11th stock car race of the 2016 NASCAR Xfinity Series and the 35th running of the event. The race was held on Saturday, in Fontana, California, at Charlotte Motor Speedway, a 1.5 miles (2.4 km) permanent quad-shaped oval racetrack. The race took 206 laps to complete, including six overtime laps. NASCAR Cup Series driver Denny Hamlin took home the win, his first of the season and 15th all-time in the Xfinity Series. Richard Childress Racing's Austin Dillon and Team Penske's Joey Logano finished second and third, respectively.

== Report ==
=== Background ===
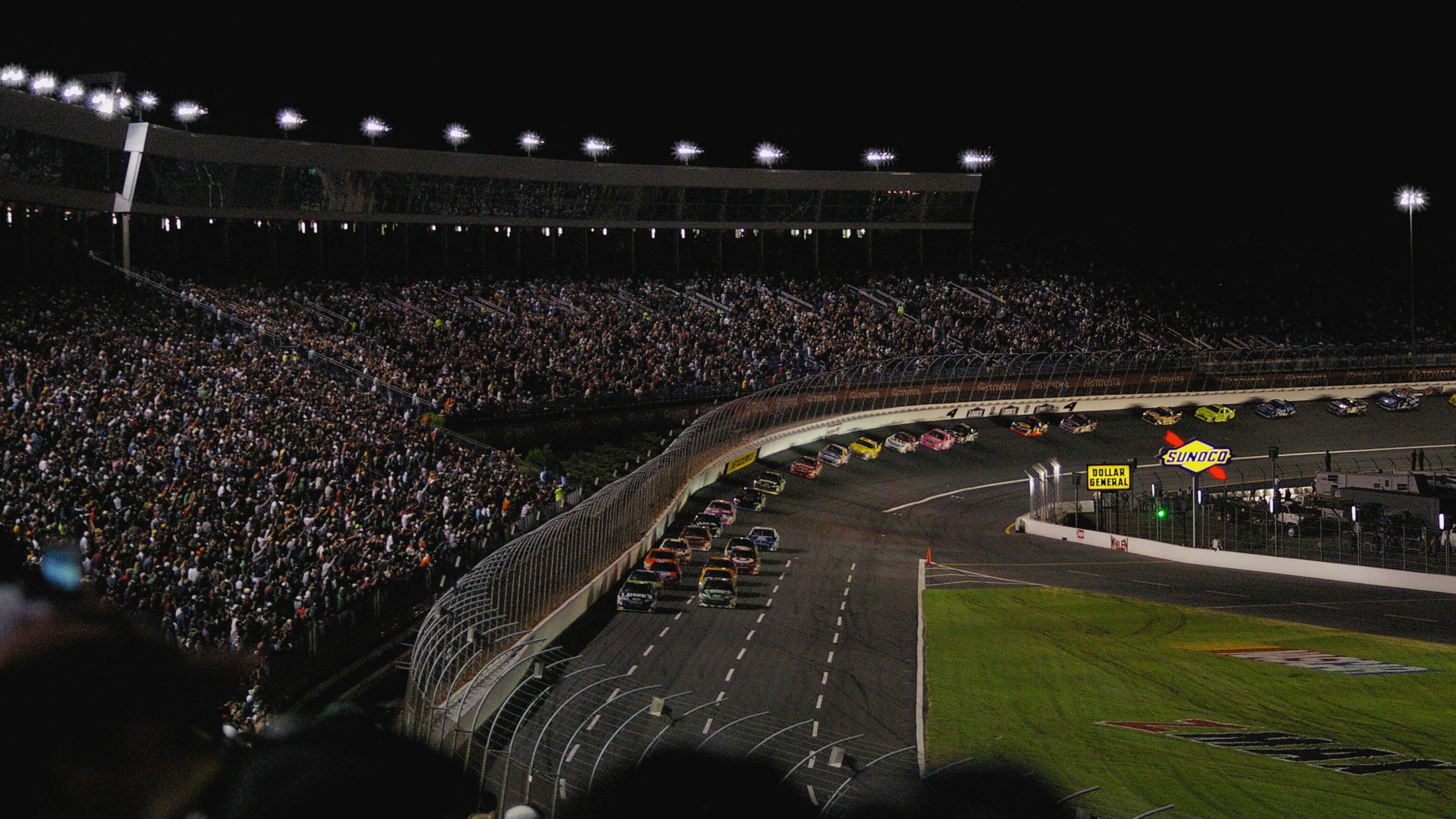
Charlotte Motor Speedway, the track where the race was held.

The race was held at Charlotte Motor Speedway, located in Concord, North Carolina. The speedway complex includes a 1.5-mile (2.4 km) quad-oval track that was utilized for the race, as well as a dragstrip and a dirt track. The speedway was built in 1959 by Bruton Smith and is considered the home track for NASCAR with many race teams based in the Charlotte metropolitan area. The track is owned and operated by Speedway Motorsports Inc. (SMI) with Marcus G. Smith serving as track president.

==== Entry list ====
- (R) denotes rookie driver.
- (i) denotes driver who is ineligible for series driver points.

No.	Driver	Team	Manufacturer
0	Garrett Smithley (R)	JD Motorsports	Chevrolet
01	Ryan Preece (R)	JD Motorsports	Chevrolet
1	Elliott Sadler	JR Motorsports	Chevrolet
2	Austin Dillon (i)	Richard Childress Racing	Chevrolet
3	Ty Dillon	Richard Childress Racing	Chevrolet
4	Ross Chastain	JD Motorsports	Chevrolet
6	Bubba Wallace	Roush Fenway Racing	Ford
07	Ray Black Jr. (R)	SS-Green Light Racing	Chevrolet
7	Justin Allgaier	JR Motorsports	Chevrolet
10	Matt DiBenedetto (i)	TriStar Motorsports	Toyota
11	Blake Koch	Kaulig Racing	Chevrolet
12	Ryan Blaney (i)	Team Penske	Ford
13	Carl Long	MBM Motorsports	Toyota
14	Jeff Green	TriStar Motorsports	Toyota
15	Cody Ware (R)	Rick Ware Racing	Ford
16	Ryan Reed	Roush Fenway Racing	Ford
18	Denny Hamlin (i)	Joe Gibbs Racing	Toyota
19	Daniel Suárez	Joe Gibbs Racing	Toyota
20	Erik Jones (R)	Joe Gibbs Racing	Toyota
21	Spencer Gallagher (i)	GMS Racing	Chevrolet
22	Joey Logano (i)	Team Penske	Ford
24	Drew Herring	JGL Racing	Toyota
25	Timmy Hill (i)	Rick Ware Racing	Chevrolet
28	Dakoda Armstrong	JGL Racing	Toyota
33	Brandon Jones (R)	Richard Childress Racing	Chevrolet
39	Ryan Sieg	RSS Racing	Chevrolet
40	TJ Bell	MBM Motorsports	Dodge
42	Kyle Larson (i)	Chip Ganassi Racing	Chevrolet
43	Jeb Burton	Richard Petty Motorsports	Ford
44	J. J. Yeley	TriStar Motorsports	Toyota
48	Brennan Poole (R)	Chip Ganassi Racing	Chevrolet
51	Jeremy Clements	Jeremy Clements Racing	Chevrolet
52	Joey Gase	Jimmy Means Racing	Chevrolet
62	Brendan Gaughan	Richard Childress Racing	Chevrolet
70	Derrike Cope	Derrike Cope Racing	Chevrolet
74	Mike Harmon	Mike Harmon Racing	Dodge
78	B. J. McLeod (R)	B. J. McLeod Motorsports	Ford
88	Cole Custer (i)	JR Motorsports	Chevrolet
89	Morgan Shepherd	Shepherd Racing Ventures	Chevrolet
90	Martin Roy	King Autosport	Chevrolet
93	Josh Wise (i)	RSS Racing	Chevrolet
97	Harrison Rhodes	Obaika Racing	Chevrolet
Official entry list

== Practice ==
=== Practice 1 ===
Rookie Erik Jones was the fastest in the first practice session with a time of 29.808 seconds and a speed of 181.159 mph (291.547 km/h).

==== Practice 1 results ====
Pos	No.	Driver	Team	Manufacturer	Time	Speed
1	20	Erik Jones (R)	Joe Gibbs Racing	Toyota	29.808	181.159
2	18	Denny Hamlin (i)	Joe Gibbs Racing	Toyota	29.903	180.584
3	12	Ryan Blaney (i)	Team Penske	Ford	30.021	179.874
Official practice results

=== Final Practice ===
Ty Dillon was fastest in the final practice session with a time of 29.778 seconds and a speed of 181.342 mph (291.842 km/h).

Pos	No.	Driver	Team	Manufacturer	Time	Speed
1	3	Ty Dillon	Richard Childress Racing	Chevrolet	29.778	181.342
2	19	Daniel Suárez	Joe Gibbs Racing	Toyota	28.825	181.056
3	20	Erik Jones (R)	Joe Gibbs Racing	Toyota	29.937	180.379
Official practice results

== Qualifying ==
Erik Jones scored the pole for the race with a time of 29.261 and a speed of 184.546 mph (296.998 km/h). T. J. Bell and Morgan Shepherd did not qualify. Carl Long, Martin Roy, Timmy Hill, Derrike Cope, Mike Harmon, Cody Ware, and Harrison Rhodes all qualified based on owner points.

=== Qualifying results ===
Pos	No.	Driver	Team	Manufacturer	Time
1	20	Erik Jones (R)	Joe Gibbs Racing	Toyota	29.261
2	19	Daniel Suárez	Joe Gibbs Racing	Toyota	29.273
3	18	Denny Hamlin (i)	Joe Gibbs Racing	Toyota	29.473
4	2	Austin Dillon (i)	Richard Childress Racing	Chevrolet	29.567
5	42	Kyle Larson (i)	Chip Ganassi Racing	Chevrolet	29.597
6	1	Elliott Sadler	JR Motorsports	Chevrolet	29.659
7	22	Joey Logano (i)	Team Penske	Ford	26.672
8	7	Justin Allgaier	JR Motorsports	Chevrolet	29.676
9	6	Bubba Wallace	Roush Fenway Racing	Ford	29.759
10	3	Ty Dillon	Richard Childress Racing	Chevrolet	29.921
11	88	Cole Custer (i)	JR Motorsports	Chevrolet	29.976
12	33	Brandon Jones (R)	Richard Childress Racing	Chevrolet	30.005
13	12	Ryan Blaney (i)	Team Penske	Ford	29.989
14	48	Brennan Poole (R)	Chip Ganassi Racing	Chevrolet	30.062
15	16	Ryan Reed	Roush Fenway Racing	Ford	30.084
16	4	Ross Chastain	JD Motorsports	Chevrolet	30.141
17	62	Brendan Gaughan	Richard Childress Racing	Chevrolet	30.246
18	11	Blake Koch	Kaulig Racing	Chevrolet	30.325
19	39	Ryan Sieg	RSS Racing	Chevrolet	30.380
20	24	Drew Herring	JGL Racing	Ford	30.469
21	51	Jeremy Clements	Jeremy Clements Racing	Chevrolet	30.549
22	21	Spencer Gallagher (i)	GMS Racing	Chevrolet	30.712
23	28	Dakoda Armstrong	JGL Racing	Toyota	30.885
24	10	Matt DiBenedetto (i)	TriStar Motorsports	Toyota	
25	44	J. J. Yeley	TriStar Motorsports	Toyota	30.554
26	01	Ryan Preece (R)	JD Motorsports	Chevrolet	30.554
27	43	Jeb Burton	Richard Petty Motorsports	Ford	30.712
28	93	Josh Wise (i)	RSS Racing	Chevrolet	30.741
29	14	Jeff Green	TriStar Motorsports	Toyota	30.784
30	78	B. J. McLeod	B. J. McLeod Motorsports	Ford	30.847
31	0	Garrett Smithley (R)	JD Motorsports	Chevrolet	30.964
32	07	Ray Black Jr. (R)	SS-Green Light Racing	Chevrolet	31.158
33	52	Joey Gase	Jimmy Means Racing	Chevrolet	31.325
34	13	Carl Long	MBM Motorsports	Toyota	31.370
35	90	Martin Roy	King Autosport	Chevrolet	31.371
36	25	Timmy Hill (i)	Rick Ware Racing	Chevrolet	31.488
37	70	Derrike Cope	Derrike Cope Racing	Chevrolet	31.633
38	74	Mike Harmon	Mike Harmon Racing	Dodge	32.054
39	15	Cody Ware (R)	Rick Ware Racing	Ford	32.070
40	97	Harrison Rhodes	Obaika Racing	Chevrolet	32.703
41	40	TJ Bell	MBM Motorsports	Dodge	31.498 ^{DNQ}
42	42	Morgan Shepherd	Shepherd Racing Ventures	Chevrolet	31.599 ^{DNQ}
Official qualifying results

== Race ==
=== Race results ===
Pos	Grid	No	Driver	Team	Manufacturer	Laps	Points
1	3	18	Denny Hamlin (i)	Joe Gibbs Racing	Toyota	206	0
2	4	2	Austin Dillon (i)	Richard Childress Racing	Chevrolet	206	0
3	7	22	Joey Logano (i)	Team Penske	Ford	206	0
4	11	88	Cole Custer (i)	JR Motorsports	Chevrolet	206	0
5	8	7	Justin Allgaier	JR Motorsports	Chevrolet	206	36
6	5	42	Kyle Larson (i)	Chip Ganassi Racing	Chevrolet	206	0
7	12	33	Brandon Jones (R)	Richard Childress Racing	Chevrolet	206	34
8	10	3	Ty Dillon	Richard Childress Racing	Chevrolet	206	33
9	14	48	Brennan Poole (R)	Chip Ganassi Racing	Chevrolet	206	32
10	17	62	Brendan Gaughan	Richard Childress Racing	Chevrolet	206	31
11	27	43	Jeb Burton	Richard Petty Motorsports	Ford	206	30
12	2	19	Daniel Suárez	Joe Gibbs Racing	Toyota	206	30
13	19	39	Ryan Sieg	RSS Racing	Chevrolet	206	28
14	18	11	Blake Koch	Kaulig Racing	Chevrolet	206	27
15	31	0	Garrett Smithley (R)	JD Motorsports	Chevrolet	206	26
16	13	12	Ryan Blaney (i)	Team Penske	Ford	205	0
17	16	4	Ross Chastain	JD Motorsports	Chevrolet	205	25
18	20	24	Drew Herring	JGL Racing	Toyota	205	23
19	15	16	Ryan Reed	Roush Fenway Racing	Ford	204	22
20	21	51	Jeremy Clements	Jeremy Clements Racing	Chevrolet	204	21
21	23	28	Dakoda Armstrong	JGL Racing	Toyota	204	20
22	26	01	Ryan Preece (R)	JD Motorsports	Chevrolet	203	19
23	25	44	J. J. Yeley	TriStar Motorsports	Toyota	203	18
24	40	97	Harrison Rhodes	Obaika Racing	Chevrolet	203	17
25	30	78	B. J. McLeod (R)	B. J. McLeod Motorsports	Ford	202	16
26	35	90	Martin Roy	King Autosport	Chevrolet	202	15
27	9	6	Bubba Wallace	Roush Fenway Racing	Ford	201	15
28	6	1	Elliott Sadler	JR Motorsports	Chevrolet	200	13
29	22	21	Spencer Gallagher (i)	GMS Racing	Chevrolet	200	0
30	34	13	Carl Long	MBM Motorsports	Toyota	200	11
31	1	20	Erik Jones (R)	Joe Gibbs Racing	Toyota	197	11
32	37	70	Derrike Cope	Derrike Cope Racing	Chevrolet	183	9
33	36	25	Timmy Hill (i)	Rick Ware Racing	Chevrolet	130	0
34	29	14	Jeff Green	TriStar Motorsports	Toyota	127	8
35	38	74	Mike Harmon	Mike Harmon Racing	Dodge	91	6
36	33	52	Joey Gase	Jimmy Means Racing	Chevrolet	84	5
37	32	07	Ray Black Jr. (R)	SS-Green Light Racing	Chevrolet	27	4
38	39	15	Cody Ware (R)	Rick Ware Racing	Ford	12	3
39	28	93	Josh Wise (i)	RSS Racing	Chevrolet	5	0
40	24	10	Matt DiBenedetto (i)	TriStar Motorsports	Toyota	3	0
Official race results

=== Race statistics ===
- Lead changes: 21 among 10 different drivers
- Cautions/Laps: 8 for 54 laps
- Red flags: 0
- Time of race: 2 hours, 41 minutes and 54 seconds
- Average speed: 114.515 miles per hour (184.294 km/h)

== Media ==
=== Television ===
The race was covered on Fox Sports 1 on television. Adam Alexander, Clint Bowyer and Michael Waltrip called the race in the booth. Jamie Little, Chris Neville, and Matt Yocum provided reports from Pit Road.

FS1
Booth announcers	Pit reporters
Lap-by-lap: Adam Alexander; Color-commentator: Clint Bowyer; Color-commentator: Michael Waltrip	Jamie Little; Chris NevilleMatt Yocum

=== Radio ===
PRN had the radio call for the race, which was also simulcast on Sirius XM NASCAR Radio.

== Standings after the race ==
Drivers' Championship standings

	Pos	Driver	Points
1	1	Daniel Suárez	376
1	2	Elliott Sadler	362 (-14)
1	3	Justin Allgaier	353 (-23)
1	4	Ty Dillon	352 (-24)
1	5	Brendan Gaughan	336 (-40)
1	6	Brandon Jones	324 (-52)
2	7	Erik Jones	320 (-56)
	8	Brennan Poole	314 (-62)
	9	Bubba Wallace	283 (-93)
	10	Ryan Reed	266 (-110)
	11	Jeb Burton	260 (-116)
	12	Ryan Sieg	251 (-125)
Official driver's standings

Manufacturers' Championship standings

Pos	Manufacturer	Points
1	Toyota	460
2	Chevrolet	445 (-15)
3	Ford	388 (-72)
4	Dodge	94 (-366)

- Note: Only the first 12 positions are included for the driver standings.

Previous race: 2016 Ollie's Bargain Outlet 200	NASCAR Xfinity Series; 2016 season	Next race: 2016 Pocono Green 250
