= 2016 Ollie's Bargain Outlet 200 =

Tenth race of the 2016 NASCAR Xfinity Series

Race details
- Race 10 of 33 in the 2016 NASCAR Xfinity Series
- Date: May 14, 2016
- Official name: 35th Annual Ollie's Bargain Outlet 200
- Location: Dover International Speedway, Dover, Delaware
- Course: Permanent racing facility
- Course length: 1 miles (1.6 km)
- Distance: 120 laps, 120 mi (193 km)
- Scheduled distance: 120 laps, 120 mi (193 km)
- Average speed: 122.867 mph (197.735 km/h)

Pole position
Driver	Erik Jones	Joe Gibbs Racing
- Grid positions set by heat results

Most laps led
Driver	Erik Jones	Joe Gibbs Racing
- Laps: 76

Winner
No. 20	Erik Jones	Joe Gibbs Racing

Television in the United States
- Network: FOX
- Announcers: Adam Alexander, Michael Waltrip, and Brad Keselowski

Radio in the United States
- Radio: MRN

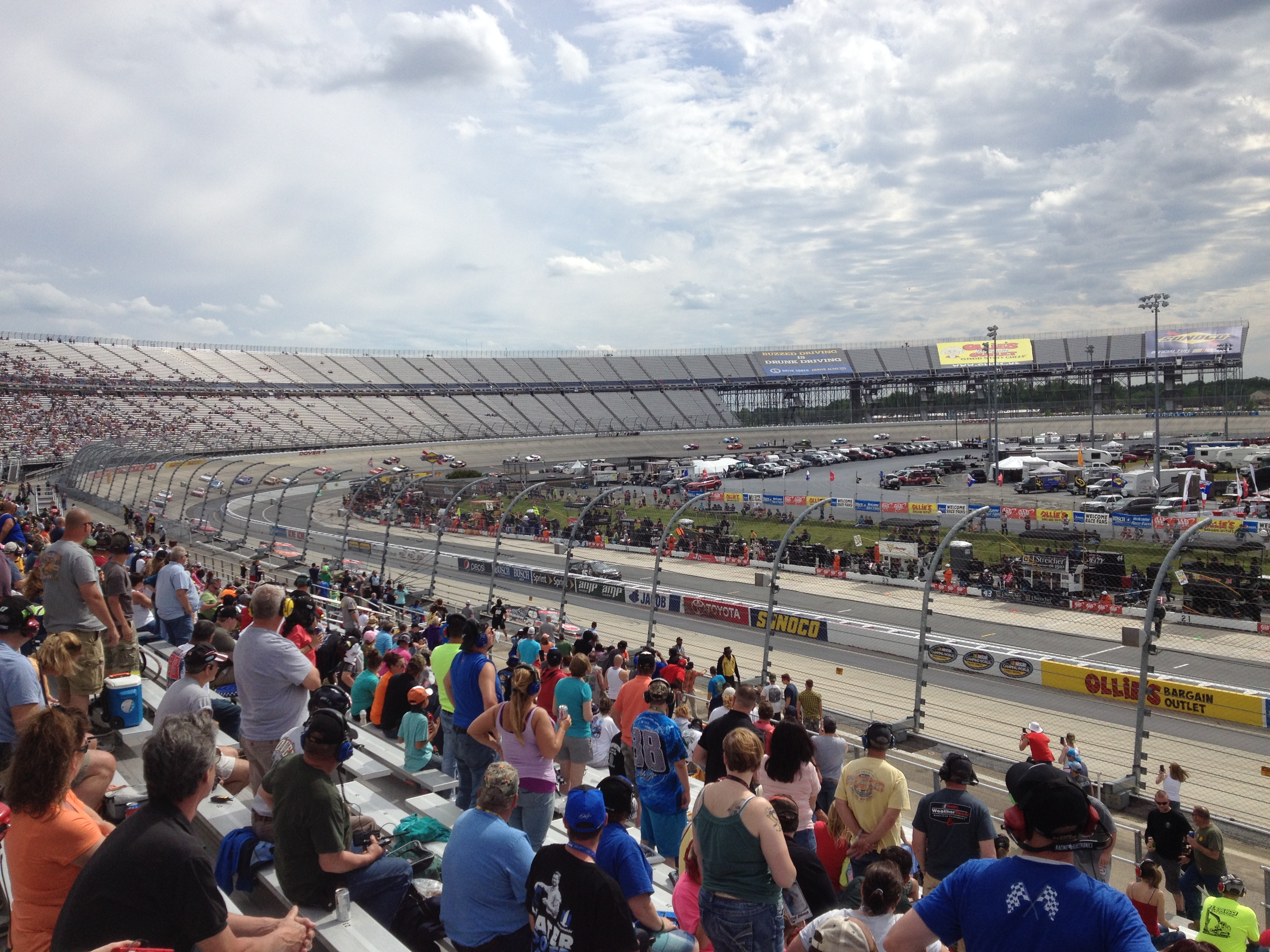
The 2016 Ollie's Bargain Outlet 200 at Dover International Speedway viewed from the frontstretch, with Ty Dillon (#3) leading Erik Jones (#20) and the rest of the field.

The 2016 Ollie's Bargain Outlet 200 was the tenth stock car race of the 2016 NASCAR Xfinity Series season, and the 35th iteration of the event. The race was held on Saturday, May 14, 2016, in Dover, Delaware at Dover International Speedway, a 1 mile (1.6 km) permanent oval-shaped racetrack. The race took the scheduled 120 laps to complete, with the first 80 laps being split into two 40-lap heats of 20 cars. Erik Jones, driving for Joe Gibbs Racing, would take the lead early, and dominate most of the race for his fourth career NASCAR Xfinity Series win, and his second of the season. To fill out the podium, Bubba Wallace, driving for Roush Fenway Racing, and Alex Bowman, driving for JR Motorsports, would finish second and third, respectively.

== Background ==
The layout of Dover International Speedway, the circuit where the race was held.

Dover International Speedway is a race track in Dover, Delaware, United States. The track has hosted at least one NASCAR Cup Series race each year since 1969, including two per year since 1971. In addition to NASCAR, the track also hosted USAC and the Indy Racing League. The track features one layout, a 1 mile (1.6 km) concrete oval, with 24° banking in the turns and 9° banking on the straights. The speedway is owned and operated by Speedway Motorsports.

The track, nicknamed "The Monster Mile", was built in 1969 by Melvin Joseph of Melvin L. Joseph Construction Company, Inc., with an asphalt surface, but was replaced with concrete in 1995. Six years later in 2001, the track's capacity increased to 135,000 seats, giving the track the largest seating capacity of any sports venue in the mid-Atlantic region. In 2002, the name changed to Dover International Speedway from Dover Downs International Speedway after Dover Downs Gaming and Entertainment split, making Dover Motorsports. From 2007 to 2009, the speedway worked on an improvement project called "The Monster Makeover", which expanded facilities at the track and beautified the track. Depending on configuration, the track's capacity is at 95,500 seats. Its grand total maximum capacity was at 135,000 spectators.

=== Dash 4 Cash format and eligibility ===
In 2016, NASCAR would announce changes to its Dash 4 Cash format. The format would now include heat races to determine qualifiers. Each driver would qualify for heats in knockout qualifying, with odd-position drivers driving in heat No. 1, and even-position drivers competing in heat No. 2. The top two finishers of each heat would compete for the Dash 4 Cash in the main race after the heats.

=== Entry list ===
- (R) denotes rookie driver.
- (i) denotes driver who is ineligible for series driver points.

#	Driver	Team	Make	Sponsor
0	Garrett Smithley (R)	JD Motorsports	Chevrolet	Heroes Haven
01	Ryan Preece (R)	JD Motorsports	Chevrolet	Meding's Seafood, IronSource
1	Elliott Sadler	JR Motorsports	Chevrolet	OneMain Financial
2	Paul Menard (i)	Richard Childress Racing	Chevrolet	Richmond Water Heaters, Menards
3	Ty Dillon	Richard Childress Racing	Chevrolet	Rheem
4	Ross Chastain	JD Motorsports	Chevrolet	Delaware Department of Transportation
6	Bubba Wallace	Roush Fenway Racing	Ford	LoudMouth Exhaust
07	Ray Black Jr. (R)	SS-Green Light Racing	Chevrolet	Scuba Life
7	Justin Allgaier	JR Motorsports	Chevrolet	TaxSlayer
10	Matt DiBenedetto (i)	TriStar Motorsports	Toyota	TriStar Motorsports
11	Blake Koch	Kaulig Racing	Chevrolet	LeafFilter Gutter Protection
13	Timmy Hill (i)	MBM Motorsports	Dodge	Chris Kyle Foundation
14	Jeff Green	TriStar Motorsports	Toyota	TriStar Motorsports
15	Travis Kvapil (i)	Rick Ware Racing	Ford	Keen Parts, CorvetteParts.net
16	Ryan Reed	Roush Fenway Racing	Ford	Lilly Diabetes, American Diabetes Association
18	Matt Tifft (i)	Joe Gibbs Racing	Toyota	Oberto Beef Jerky
19	Daniel Suárez	Joe Gibbs Racing	Toyota	Arris
20	Erik Jones (R)	Joe Gibbs Racing	Toyota	Reser's Fine Foods
22	Joey Logano (i)	Team Penske	Ford	Fleetwood, REV Group
24	Drew Herring	JGL Racing	Toyota	JGL Young Guns
25	Ryan Ellis	Rick Ware Racing	Chevrolet	Lilly Trucking, CarportEmpire.com
28	Dakoda Armstrong	JGL Racing	Toyota	JGL Racing
33	Brandon Jones (R)	Richard Childress Racing	Chevrolet	Chevrolet Military Discount
39	Ryan Sieg	RSS Racing	Chevrolet	Crabby J Spice
40	Carl Long	MBM Motorsports	Toyota	Chris Kyle Foundation
42	Justin Marks	Chip Ganassi Racing	Chevrolet	Katerra
43	Jeb Burton	Richard Petty Motorsports	Ford	Rocky Ridge Custom Trucks
44	J. J. Yeley	TriStar Motorsports	Toyota	Zachry
48	Brennan Poole (R)	Chip Ganassi Racing	Chevrolet	DC Solar
51	Jeremy Clements	Jeremy Clements Racing	Chevrolet	RepairableVehicles.com
52	Joey Gase	Jimmy Means Racing	Chevrolet	DB Sales
62	Brendan Gaughan	Richard Childress Racing	Chevrolet	South Point Hotel, Casino & Spa
70	Derrike Cope	Derrike Cope Racing	Chevrolet	Speedway Cafe, Acredale Vending
74	Mike Harmon	Mike Harmon Racing	Dodge	Truckers Final Mile
78	B. J. McLeod (R)	B. J. McLeod Motorsports	Ford	B. J. McLeod Motorsports
88	Alex Bowman	JR Motorsports	Chevrolet	Advance Auto Parts
89	Morgan Shepherd	Shepherd Racing Ventures	Chevrolet	Shepherd Racing Ventures
90	Mario Gosselin	DGM Racing	Chevrolet	Victoriaville RV Center
93	Josh Reaume	RSS Racing	Chevrolet	RSS Racing
97	Alex Guenette	Obaika Racing	Chevrolet	Vroom! Brands
Official entry list

== Practice ==
=== First practice ===
The first practice session was held on Friday, May 13, at 10:00 am EST. The session would last for 55 minutes. Erik Jones, driving for Joe Gibbs Racing, would set the fastest time in the session, with a time of 22.699 and an average speed of 158.597 mph (255.237 km/h).

Pos.	#	Driver	Team	Make	Time	Speed
1	20	Erik Jones (R)	Joe Gibbs Racing	Toyota	22.699	158.597
2	3	Ty Dillon	Richard Childress Racing	Chevrolet	22.709	158.527
3	19	Daniel Suárez	Joe Gibbs Racing	Toyota	22.748	158.256
Full first practice results

=== Final practice ===
The final practice session was held on Friday, May 13, at 12:30 pm EST. The session was scheduled to last for 1 hour and 25 minutes, but due to inclement weather, the session would end early. Daniel Suárez, driving for Joe Gibbs Racing, would set the fastest time in the session, with a time of 22.969, and an average speed of 156.733 mph (252.237 km/h).

Pos.	#	Driver	Team	Make	Time	Speed
1	19	Daniel Suárez	Joe Gibbs Racing	Toyota	22.969	156.733
2	20	Erik Jones (R)	Joe Gibbs Racing	Toyota	22.988	156.603
3	18	Matt Tifft (i)	Joe Gibbs Racing	Toyota	23.087	155.932
Full final practice results

== Heat qualifying ==
Qualifying for the two preliminary heat races was held on Saturday, May 14, at 10:45 am EST. Since Dover International Speedway is under 2 miles (3.2 km) in length, the qualifying system was a multi-car system that included three rounds. The first round was 15 minutes, where every driver would be able to set a lap within the 15 minutes. Then, the second round would consist of the fastest 24 cars in Round 1, and drivers would have 10 minutes to set a lap. Round 3 consisted of the fastest 12 drivers from Round 2, and the drivers would have 5 minutes to set a time. Whoever was fastest in Round 3 would win the pole.

Erik Jones, driving for Joe Gibbs Racing, would win the pole for heat No. 1, with a lap of 22.915, and an average speed of 157.102 mph (252.831 km/h) in the third round. Meanwhile, Daniel Suárez, also driving for Joe Gibbs Racing, would win the pole for heat No. 2, with a lap of 22.943, and an average speed of 156.911 mph (252.524 km/h) in the third round.

No drivers would fail to qualify.

=== Full qualifying results ===
Pos.	#	Driver	Team	Make	Time (R1)	Speed (R1)	Time (R2)	Speed (R2)	Time (R3)	Speed (R3)
1	20	Erik Jones (R)	Joe Gibbs Racing	Toyota	23.430	153.649	23.018	156.399	22.915	157.102
2	19	Daniel Suárez	Joe Gibbs Racing	Toyota	22.814	157.798	23.113	155.757	22.943	156.911
3	7	Justin Allgaier	JR Motorsports	Chevrolet	23.473	153.368	23.218	155.052	23.102	155.831
4	1	Elliott Sadler	JR Motorsports	Chevrolet	23.139	155.581	23.236	154.932	23.110	155.777
5	88	Alex Bowman	JR Motorsports	Chevrolet	23.341	154.235	23.336	154.268	23.187	155.259
6	3	Ty Dillon	Richard Childress Racing	Chevrolet	23.237	154.925	23.329	154.314	23.200	155.172
7	2	Paul Menard (i)	Richard Childress Racing	Chevrolet	23.395	153.879	23.256	154.799	23.205	155.139
8	18	Matt Tifft (i)	Joe Gibbs Racing	Toyota	23.144	155.548	23.255	154.805	23.260	154.772
9	48	Brennan Poole (R)	Chip Ganassi Racing	Chevrolet	23.686	151.989	23.332	154.268	23.309	154.447
10	39	Ryan Sieg	RSS Racing	Chevrolet	23.315	154.407	23.326	154.334	23.319	154.381
11	22	Joey Logano (i)	Team Penske	Ford	23.407	153.800	23.201	155.166	23.347	154.195
12	62	Brendan Gaughan	Richard Childress Racing	Chevrolet	23.534	152.970	23.432	153.636	23.522	153.048
Eliminated in Round 2
13	6	Bubba Wallace	Roush Fenway Racing	Ford	23.336	154.268	23.452	153.505	–	–
14	33	Brandon Jones (R)	Richard Childress Racing	Chevrolet	23.651	152.213	23.497	153.211	–	–
15	16	Ryan Reed	Roush Fenway Racing	Ford	23.660	152.156	23.503	153.172	–	–
16	42	Justin Marks	Chip Ganassi Racing	Chevrolet	23.652	152.207	23.555	152.834	–	–
17	44	J. J. Yeley	TriStar Motorsports	Toyota	23.792	151.311	23.631	152.342	–	–
18	51	Jeremy Clements	Jeremy Clements Racing	Chevrolet	23.491	153.250	23.658	152.168	–	–
19	24	Drew Herring	JGL Racing	Toyota	23.358	154.123	23.676	152.053	–	–
20	4	Ross Chastain	JD Motorsports	Chevrolet	23.395	154.879	23.696	151.924	–	–
21	11	Blake Koch	Kaulig Racing	Chevrolet	23.857	150.899	23.743	151.624	–	–
22	07	Ray Black Jr. (R)	SS-Green Light Racing	Chevrolet	23.679	152.033	23.937	150.395	–	–
23	01	Ryan Preece (R)	JD Motorsports	Chevrolet	23.858	150.893	23.969	150.194	–	–
24	28	Dakoda Armstrong	JGL Racing	Toyota	23.878	150.766	24.084	149.477	–	–
Eliminated in Round 1
25	10	Matt DiBenedetto (i)	TriStar Motorsports	Toyota	23.917	150.521	–	–	–	–
26	43	Jeb Burton	Richard Petty Motorsports	Ford	23.930	150.439	–	–	–	–
27	14	Jeff Green	TriStar Motorsports	Toyota	24.146	149.093	–	–	–	–
28	78	B. J. McLeod (R)	B. J. McLeod Motorsports	Ford	24.253	148.435	–	–	–	–
29	90	Mario Gosselin	DGM Racing	Chevrolet	24.254	148.429	–	–	–	–
30	25	Ryan Ellis	Rick Ware Racing	Chevrolet	24.281	148.264	–	–	–	–
31	0	Garrett Smithley (R)	JD Motorsports	Chevrolet	24.428	147.372	–	–	–	–
32	52	Joey Gase	Jimmy Means Racing	Chevrolet	24.469	147.125	–	–	–	–
33	13	Timmy Hill (i)	MBM Motorsports	Dodge	24.485	147.029	–	–	–	–
34	40	Carl Long	MBM Motorsports	Toyota	24.699	145.755	–	–	–	–
35	97	Alex Guenette	Obaika Racing	Chevrolet	24.703	145.731	–	–	–	–
36	89	Morgan Shepherd	Shepherd Racing Ventures	Chevrolet	24.716	145.655	–	–	–	–
37	74	Mike Harmon	Mike Harmon Racing	Dodge	24.801	145.155	–	–	–	–
38	93	Josh Reaume	RSS Racing	Chevrolet	25.454	141.432	–	–	–	–
39	70	Derrike Cope	Derrike Cope Racing	Chevrolet	25.724	139.947	–	–	–	–
40	15	Travis Kvapil (i)	Rick Ware Racing	Ford	–	–	–	–	–	–
Official qualifying results
Heat #1 lineup
Heat #2 lineup

== Heat No. 1 results ==
Heat No. 1 was held on Saturday, May 14, at 2:00 pm EST. The race took the scheduled 40 laps to complete. Justin Allgaier, driving for JR Motorsports, would pass Erik Jones in the final nine laps to win the heat and the overall pole. Jones would complete the two drivers in the heat eligible for the Dash 4 Cash.

Fin	St	#	Driver	Team	Make	Laps	Led	Status
1	2	7	Justin Allgaier	JR Motorsports	Chevrolet	40	30	Running
2	1	20	Erik Jones (R)	Joe Gibbs Racing	Toyota	40	10	Running
3	3	88	Alex Bowman	JR Motorsports	Chevrolet	40	0	Running
4	6	22	Joey Logano (i)	Team Penske	Ford	40	0	Running
5	4	2	Paul Menard (i)	Richard Childress Racing	Chevrolet	40	0	Running
6	7	6	Bubba Wallace	Roush Fenway Racing	Ford	40	0	Running
7	5	48	Brennan Poole (R)	Chip Ganassi Racing	Chevrolet	40	0	Running
8	8	16	Ryan Reed	Roush Fenway Racing	Ford	40	0	Running
9	9	44	J. J. Yeley	TriStar Motorsports	Toyota	40	0	Running
10	11	11	Blake Koch	Kaulig Racing	Chevrolet	40	0	Running
11	10	24	Drew Herring	JGL Racing	Toyota	40	0	Running
12	14	14	Jeff Green	TriStar Motorsports	Toyota	39	0	Running
13	15	90	Mario Gosselin	DGM Racing	Chevrolet	39	0	Running
14	16	0	Garrett Smithley (R)	JD Motorsports	Chevrolet	39	0	Running
15	18	97	Alex Guenette	Obaika Racing	Chevrolet	38	0	Running
16	12	01	Ryan Preece (R)	JD Motorsports	Chevrolet	29	0	Running
17	17	13	Timmy Hill (i)	MBM Motorsports	Dodge	25	0	Running
18	20	70	Derrike Cope	Derrike Cope Racing	Chevrolet	22	0	Running
19	13	10	Matt DiBenedetto (i)	TriStar Motorsports	Toyota	19	0	Vibration
20	19	74	Mike Harmon	Mike Harmon Racing	Dodge	6	0	Engine
Official Heat #1 results

== Heat No. 2 results ==
Heat No. 2 was held on Saturday, May 14, at approximately 2:50 pm EST. The race took the scheduled 40 laps to complete. Ty Dillon, driving for Richard Childress Racing, would hold off Daniel Suárez in a six lap shootout to win the outside pole. Suárez would complete the two drivers in the heat eligible for the Dash 4 Cash.

Fin	St	#	Driver	Team	Make	Laps	Led	Status
1	3	3	Ty Dillon	Richard Childress Racing	Chevrolet	40	6	Running
2	1	19	Daniel Suárez	Joe Gibbs Racing	Toyota	40	34	Running
3	5	39	Ryan Sieg	RSS Racing	Chevrolet	40	0	Running
4	4	18	Matt Tifft (i)	Joe Gibbs Racing	Toyota	40	0	Running
5	7	33	Brandon Jones (R)	Richard Childress Racing	Chevrolet	40	0	Running
6	6	62	Brendan Gaughan	Richard Childress Racing	Chevrolet	40	0	Running
7	13	43	Jeb Burton	Richard Petty Motorsports	Ford	40	0	Running
8	10	4	Ross Chastain	JD Motorsports	Chevrolet	40	0	Running
9	9	51	Jeremy Clements	Jeremy Clements Racing	Chevrolet	40	0	Running
10	11	07	Ray Black Jr. (R)	SS-Green Light Racing	Chevrolet	40	0	Running
11	12	28	Dakoda Armstrong	JGL Racing	Toyota	40	0	Running
12	20	15	Travis Kvapil (i)	Rick Ware Racing	Ford	39	0	Running
13	15	25	Ryan Ellis	Rick Ware Racing	Chevrolet	39	0	Running
14	16	52	Joey Gase	Jimmy Means Racing	Chevrolet	39	0	Running
15	14	78	B. J. McLeod (R)	B. J. McLeod Motorsports	Ford	39	0	Running
16	2	1	Elliott Sadler	JR Motorsports	Chevrolet	37	0	Running
17	8	42	Justin Marks	Chip Ganassi Racing	Chevrolet	26	0	Accident
18	17	40	Carl Long	MBM Motorsports	Toyota	11	0	Vibration
19	18	89	Morgan Shepherd	Shepherd Racing Ventures	Chevrolet	9	0	Rear Gear
20	19	93	Josh Reaume	RSS Racing	Chevrolet	4	0	Brakes
Official Heat #2 results

== Main race lineup ==
Pos.	#	Driver	Team	Make
1	7	Justin Allgaier	JR Motorsports	Chevrolet
2	3	Ty Dillon	Richard Childress Racing	Chevrolet
3	20	Erik Jones (R)	Joe Gibbs Racing	Toyota
4	19	Daniel Suárez	Joe Gibbs Racing	Toyota
5	88	Alex Bowman	JR Motorsports	Chevrolet
6	39	Ryan Sieg	RSS Racing	Chevrolet
7	22	Joey Logano (i)	Team Penske	Ford
8	18	Matt Tifft (i)	Joe Gibbs Racing	Toyota
9	2	Paul Menard (i)	Richard Childress Racing	Chevrolet
10	33	Brandon Jones (R)	Richard Childress Racing	Chevrolet
11	6	Bubba Wallace	Roush Fenway Racing	Ford
12	62	Brendan Gaughan	Richard Childress Racing	Chevrolet
13	48	Brennan Poole (R)	Chip Ganassi Racing	Chevrolet
14	43	Jeb Burton	Richard Petty Motorsports	Ford
15	16	Ryan Reed	Roush Fenway Racing	Ford
16	4	Ross Chastain	JD Motorsports	Chevrolet
17	44	J. J. Yeley	TriStar Motorsports	Toyota
18	51	Jeremy Clements	Jeremy Clements Racing	Chevrolet
19	11	Blake Koch	Kaulig Racing	Chevrolet
20	07	Ray Black Jr. (R)	SS-Green Light Racing	Chevrolet
21	24	Drew Herring	JGL Racing	Toyota
22	28	Dakoda Armstrong	JGL Racing	Toyota
23	14	Jeff Green	TriStar Motorsports	Toyota
24	15	Travis Kvapil (i)	Rick Ware Racing	Ford
25	90	Mario Gosselin	DGM Racing	Chevrolet
26	25	Ryan Ellis	Rick Ware Racing	Chevrolet
27	0	Garrett Smithley (R)	JD Motorsports	Chevrolet
28	52	Joey Gase	Jimmy Means Racing	Chevrolet
29	97	Alex Guenette	Obaika Racing	Chevrolet
30	78	B. J. McLeod (R)	B. J. McLeod Motorsports	Ford
31	01	Ryan Preece (R)	JD Motorsports	Chevrolet
32	1	Elliott Sadler	JR Motorsports	Chevrolet
33	13	Timmy Hill (i)	MBM Motorsports	Dodge
34	42	Justin Marks	Chip Ganassi Racing	Chevrolet
35	70	Derrike Cope	Derrike Cope Racing	Chevrolet
36	40	Carl Long	MBM Motorsports	Toyota
37	10	Matt DiBenedetto (i)	TriStar Motorsports	Toyota
38	89	Morgan Shepherd	Shepherd Racing Ventures	Chevrolet
39	74	Mike Harmon	Mike Harmon Racing	Dodge
40	93	Josh Reaume	RSS Racing	Chevrolet
Official main race lineup

== Main race results ==
Fin	St	#	Driver	Team	Make	Laps	Led	Status	Pts
1	3	20	Erik Jones (R)	Joe Gibbs Racing	Toyota	120	76	Running	45
2	11	6	Bubba Wallace	Roush Fenway Racing	Ford	120	0	Running	39
3	5	88	Alex Bowman	JR Motorsports	Chevrolet	120	33	Running	39
4	1	7	Justin Allgaier	JR Motorsports	Chevrolet	120	0	Running	37
5	2	3	Ty Dillon	Richard Childress Racing	Chevrolet	120	11	Running	37
6	32	1	Elliott Sadler	JR Motorsports	Chevrolet	120	0	Running	35
7	7	22	Joey Logano (i)	Team Penske	Ford	120	0	Running	0
8	8	18	Matt Tifft (i)	Joe Gibbs Racing	Toyota	120	0	Running	0
9	4	19	Daniel Suárez	Joe Gibbs Racing	Toyota	120	0	Running	32
10	13	48	Brennan Poole (R)	Chip Ganassi Racing	Chevrolet	120	0	Running	31
11	17	44	J. J. Yeley	TriStar Motorsports	Toyota	120	0	Running	30
12	19	11	Blake Koch	Kaulig Racing	Chevrolet	120	0	Running	29
13	14	43	Jeb Burton	Richard Petty Motorsports	Ford	119	0	Running	28
14	21	24	Drew Herring	JGL Racing	Toyota	119	0	Running	27
15	12	62	Brendan Gaughan	Richard Childress Racing	Chevrolet	119	0	Running	26
16	6	39	Ryan Sieg	RSS Racing	Chevrolet	118	0	Running	25
17	20	07	Ray Black Jr. (R)	SS-Green Light Racing	Chevrolet	117	0	Running	24
18	15	16	Ryan Reed	Roush Fenway Racing	Ford	117	0	Running	23
19	30	78	B. J. McLeod (R)	B. J. McLeod Motorsports	Ford	117	0	Running	22
20	16	4	Ross Chastain	JD Motorsports	Chevrolet	117	0	Running	21
21	22	28	Dakoda Armstrong	JGL Racing	Toyota	117	0	Running	20
22	18	51	Jeremy Clements	Jeremy Clements Racing	Chevrolet	117	0	Running	19
23	28	52	Joey Gase	Jimmy Means Racing	Chevrolet	117	0	Running	18
24	27	0	Garrett Smithley (R)	JD Motorsports	Chevrolet	116	0	Running	17
25	10	33	Brandon Jones (R)	Richard Childress Racing	Chevrolet	116	0	Running	16
26	33	13	Timmy Hill (i)	MBM Motorsports	Dodge	115	0	Running	0
27	29	97	Alex Guenette	Obaika Racing	Chevrolet	115	0	Running	14
28	25	90	Mario Gosselin	DGM Racing	Chevrolet	113	0	Running	13
29	9	2	Paul Menard (i)	Richard Childress Racing	Chevrolet	112	0	Running	0
30	24	15	Travis Kvapil (i)	Rick Ware Racing	Ford	109	0	Running	0
31	26	25	Ryan Ellis	Rick Ware Racing	Chevrolet	87	0	Running	10
32	39	74	Mike Harmon	Mike Harmon Racing	Dodge	81	0	Running	9
33	23	14	Jeff Green	TriStar Motorsports	Toyota	66	0	Vibration	8
34	36	40	Carl Long	MBM Motorsports	Toyota	32	0	Vibration	7
35	35	70	Derrike Cope	Derrike Cope Racing	Chevrolet	28	0	Running	6
36	38	89	Morgan Shepherd	Shepherd Racing Ventures	Chevrolet	15	0	Suspension	5
37	40	93	Josh Reaume	RSS Racing	Chevrolet	5	0	Suspension	4
38	37	10	Matt DiBenedetto (i)	TriStar Motorsports	Toyota	4	0	Vibration	0
39	31	01	Ryan Preece (R)	JD Motorsports	Chevrolet	1	0	Vibration	2
40	34	42	Justin Marks	Chip Ganassi Racing	Chevrolet	0	0	Accident	1
Official race results

== Standings after the race ==
Drivers' Championship standings

	Pos	Driver	Points
	1	Elliott Sadler	349
	2	Daniel Suárez	346 (−3)
	3	Ty Dillon	319 (−30)
	4	Justin Allgaier	317 (−32)
2	5	Erik Jones	309 (−40)
1	6	Brendan Gaughan	305 (−44)
1	7	Brandon Jones	290 (−59)
	8	Brennan Poole	282 (−67)
	9	Bubba Wallace	268 (−81)
	10	Ryan Reed	244 (−105)
	11	Jeb Burton	230 (−119)
	12	Ryan Sieg	223 (−126)
Official driver's standings

- Note: Only the first 12 positions are included for the driver standings.

Previous race: 2016 Sparks Energy 300	NASCAR Xfinity Series; 2016 season	Next race: 2016 Hisense 4K TV 300
