= 2016 Sparks Energy 300 =

Ninth race of the 2016 NASCAR Xfinity Series

Race details
- Race 9 of 33 in the 2016 NASCAR Xfinity Series
- Date: April 30, 2016
- Official name: 25th Annual Sparks Energy 300
- Location: Talladega Superspeedway, Lincoln, Alabama
- Course: Permanent racing facility
- Course length: 2.66 miles (4.28 km)
- Distance: 116 laps, 308.56 mi (496.579 km)
- Scheduled distance: 113 laps, 300.58 mi (483.736 km)
- Average speed: 132.477 mph (213.201 km/h)

Pole position
Driver	Matt Tifft	Joe Gibbs Racing
- Time: 52.857

Most laps led
Driver	Brandon Jones	Richard Childress Racing
- Laps: 36

Winner
No. 1	Elliott Sadler	JR Motorsports

Television in the United States
- Network: FS1
- Announcers: Adam Alexander, Denny Hamlin, and Michael Waltrip

Radio in the United States
- Radio: MRN

The 2016 Sparks Energy 300 was the ninth stock car race of the 2016 NASCAR Xfinity Series season, and the 25th iteration of the event. The race was held on Saturday, April 30, 2016, in Lincoln, Alabama, at Talladega Superspeedway, a 2.66 miles (4.28 km) permanent triangular-shaped superspeedway. The race was increased from 113 laps to 116 laps, due to a NASCAR overtime finish. In a wild finish that sparked controversy, Elliott Sadler, driving for JR Motorsports, would spin Brad Keselowski on the final lap, and earned his 11th career NASCAR Xfinity Series win, and his first of the season. To fill out the podium, Justin Allgaier, driving for JR Motorsports, and Brennan Poole, driving for Chip Ganassi Racing, would finish second and third, respectively.

The race would bring controversy on the final lap. Elliott Sadler would get Joey Logano loose in turn four, causing Logano to slide down the racetrack and hit Sadler. He would then ricochet up the racetrack, and Blake Koch, with nowhere to go, would slam into the side of Logano, making Logano go airborne. Ultimately, Brennan Poole would cross the line first, in a photo finish with Justin Allgaier. Since the caution came out before the field took the checkered flag, NASCAR reviewed the running positions when it flew. Elliott Sadler would be the official winner, since he was the driver that was leading when the caution came out. Allgaier and Poole would be credited with second and third place, respectively.

== Background ==
The layout of Talladega Superspeedway, the circuit where the race was held.

Talladega Superspeedway, nicknamed “'Dega”, and formerly named Alabama International Motor Speedway (AIMS) from 1969 to 1989, is a motorsports complex located north of Talladega, Alabama. It is located on the former Anniston Air Force Base in the small city of Lincoln. A tri-oval, the track was constructed in 1969 by the International Speedway Corporation, a business controlled by the France Family. As of 2021, the track hosts the NASCAR Cup Series, NASCAR Xfinity Series, NASCAR Camping World Truck Series, and ARCA Menards Series. Talladega is the longest NASCAR oval, with a length of 2.66 miles (4.281 km), compared to the Daytona International Speedway, which is 2.5 miles (4.0 km) long. The total peak capacity of Talladega is around 175,000 spectators, with the main grandstand capacity being about 80,000.

=== Entry list ===
- (R) denotes rookie driver.
- (i) denotes driver who is ineligible for series driver points.

#	Driver	Team	Make	Sponsor
0	Garrett Smithley (R)	JD Motorsports	Chevrolet	Instalco
01	Ryan Preece (R)	JD Motorsports	Chevrolet	G&K Services
1	Elliott Sadler	JR Motorsports	Chevrolet	OneMain Financial
2	Austin Dillon (i)	Richard Childress Racing	Chevrolet	Rheem
3	Ty Dillon	Richard Childress Racing	Chevrolet	Bass Pro Shops
4	Ross Chastain	JD Motorsports	Chevrolet	Flex Seal
05	John Wes Townley (i)	Athenian Motorsports	Chevrolet	Jive Communications
6	Bubba Wallace	Roush Fenway Racing	Ford	Kleen Performance
07	Ray Black Jr. (R)	SS-Green Light Racing	Chevrolet	Scuba Life
7	Justin Allgaier	JR Motorsports	Chevrolet	Breyers
10	Jeff Green	TriStar Motorsports	Toyota	TriStar Motorsports
11	Blake Koch	Kaulig Racing	Chevrolet	LeafFilter Gutter Protection
13	John Jackson	MBM Motorsports	Toyota	Florida Waterfront, Card Merrill
14	Benny Gordon	TriStar Motorsports	Toyota	VSI Racing
15	Travis Kvapil	Rick Ware Racing	Ford	Lilly Trucking, CarportEmpire.com
16	Ryan Reed	Roush Fenway Racing	Ford	Lilly Diabetes, American Diabetes Association
18	Matt Tifft (i)	Joe Gibbs Racing	Toyota	NOS Energy Drink
19	Daniel Suárez	Joe Gibbs Racing	Toyota	Arris
20	Erik Jones (R)	Joe Gibbs Racing	Toyota	GameStop
22	Joey Logano (i)	Team Penske	Ford	Discount Tire
24	Brandon McReynolds	JGL Racing	Toyota	Redneck Riviera, JGL Young Guns
25	Chris Cockrum	Chris Cockrum Racing	Chevrolet	Advanced Communications Group
28	Dakoda Armstrong	JGL Racing	Toyota	WinField
33	Brandon Jones (R)	Richard Childress Racing	Chevrolet	Okuma
39	Ryan Sieg	RSS Racing	Chevrolet	Sparks Energy
40	Carl Long	MBM Motorsports	Dodge	Phoenix Air, Schaeffer's Racing Oil
42	Justin Marks	Chip Ganassi Racing	Chevrolet	Katerra
43	Jeb Burton	Richard Petty Motorsports	Ford	J. Streicher
44	J. J. Yeley	TriStar Motorsports	Toyota	Zachry
48	Brennan Poole (R)	Chip Ganassi Racing	Chevrolet	DC Solar
51	Jeremy Clements	Jeremy Clements Racing	Chevrolet	Kevin Whitaker Chevrolet, BRT Extrusions
52	Joey Gase	Jimmy Means Racing	Chevrolet	Sparks Energy, Donate Life Alabama
62	Brendan Gaughan	Richard Childress Racing	Chevrolet	South Point Hotel, Casino & Spa
70	Derrike Cope	Derrike Cope Racing	Chevrolet	Buddy's Home Furnishings, Ice-Aid
74	Mike Harmon	Mike Harmon Racing	Dodge	National Multiple Sclerosis Society
78	B. J. McLeod (R)	B. J. McLeod Motorsports	Ford	Triple R Containers LLC
85	Bobby Gerhart	Bobby Gerhart Racing	Chevrolet	Lucas Oil
88	Chase Elliott (i)	JR Motorsports	Chevrolet	Armour Vienna Sausage
89	Morgan Shepherd	Shepherd Racing Ventures	Chevrolet	Shepherd Racing Ventures
90	Mario Gosselin	DGM Racing	Chevrolet	BuckedUp Apparel, David Johnson's Auto
93	Josh Reaume	RSS Racing	Chevrolet	RSS Racing
97	Ryan Ellis	Obaika Racing	Chevrolet	Vroom! Brands
98	Aric Almirola (i)	Biagi-DenBeste Racing	Ford	Fresh from Florida
Official entry list

== Practice ==
=== First practice ===
The first practice session was held on Friday, April 29, at 10:30 AM CST. The session would last for 55 minutes. Bubba Wallace, driving for Roush Fenway Racing, would set the fastest time in the session, with a lap of 49.768, and an average speed of 192.413 mph (309.659 km/h).

Pos.	#	Driver	Team	Make	Time	Speed
1	6	Bubba Wallace	Roush Fenway Racing	Ford	49.768	192.413
2	16	Ryan Reed	Roush Fenway Racing	Ford	49.783	192.355
3	3	Ty Dillon	Richard Childress Racing	Chevrolet	49.920	191.827
Full first practice results

=== Final practice ===
The final practice session was held on Friday, April 29, at 12:30 PM CST. Matt Tifft, driving for Joe Gibbs Racing, would set the fastest time in the session, with a lap of 52.639, and an average speed of 181.918 mph (292.769 km/h).

Pos.	#	Driver	Team	Make	Time	Speed
1	18	Matt Tifft (i)	Joe Gibbs Racing	Toyota	52.639	181.918
2	3	Ty Dillon	Richard Childress Racing	Chevrolet	52.756	181.515
3	33	Brandon Jones (R)	Richard Childress Racing	Chevrolet	53.098	180.346
Full final practice results

== Qualifying ==
Qualifying was held on Saturday, April 30, at 9:30 AM CST. Since Talladega Superspeedway is at least 2 miles (3.2 km), the qualifying system was a single car, single lap, two round system where in the first round, everyone would set a time to determine positions 13-40. Then, the fastest 12 qualifiers would move on to the second round to determine positions 1-12.

Matt Tifft, driving for Joe Gibbs Racing, would win the pole after advancing from the preliminary round and setting the fastest lap in Round 2, with a lap of 52.857, and an average speed of 181.168 mph (291.562 km/h).

Josh Reaume, Derrike Cope, and Mike Harmon would fail to qualify.

=== Full qualifying results ===
Pos.	#	Driver	Team	Make	Time (R1)	Speed (R1)	Time (R2)	Speed (R2)
1	18	Matt Tifft (i)	Joe Gibbs Racing	Toyota	53.008	180.652	52.857	181.168
2	19	Daniel Suárez	Joe Gibbs Racing	Toyota	53.075	180.424	52.951	180.846
3	2	Austin Dillon (i)	Richard Childress Racing	Chevrolet	53.371	179.423	53.051	180.506
4	20	Erik Jones (R)	Joe Gibbs Racing	Toyota	53.254	179.817	53.092	180.366
5	3	Ty Dillon	Richard Childress Racing	Chevrolet	53.337	179.538	53.136	180.217
6	62	Brendan Gaughan	Richard Childress Racing	Chevrolet	53.307	179.639	53.270	179.763
7	16	Ryan Reed	Roush Fenway Racing	Ford	53.528	178.897	53.479	179.061
8	22	Joey Logano (i)	Team Penske	Ford	53.626	178.570	53.552	178.817
9	1	Elliott Sadler	JR Motorsports	Chevrolet	53.629	178.560	53.599	178.660
10	44	J. J. Yeley	TriStar Motorsports	Toyota	53.664	178.444	53.679	178.394
11	48	Brennan Poole (R)	Chip Ganassi Racing	Chevrolet	53.642	178.517	53.869	177.765
12	43	Jeb Burton	Richard Petty Motorsports	Ford	53.617	178.600	53.910	177.629
Eliminated in Round 1
13	11	Blake Koch	Kaulig Racing	Chevrolet	53.676	178.404	-	-
14	88	Chase Elliott (i)	JR Motorsports	Chevrolet	53.735	178.208	-	-
15	6	Bubba Wallace	Roush Fenway Racing	Ford	53.737	178.201	-	-
16	33	Brandon Jones (R)	Richard Childress Racing	Chevrolet	53.770	178.092	-	-
17	98	Aric Almirola (i)	Biagi-DenBeste Racing	Ford	53.844	177.847	-	-
18	7	Justin Allgaier	JR Motorsports	Chevrolet	53.881	177.725	-	-
19	14	Benny Gordon	TriStar Motorsports	Toyota	53.926	177.577	-	-
20	42	Justin Marks	Chip Ganassi Racing	Chevrolet	53.949	177.501	-	-
21	24	Brandon McReynolds	JGL Racing	Toyota	53.955	177.481	-	-
22	28	Dakoda Armstrong	JGL Racing	Toyota	54.034	177.222	-	-
23	89	Morgan Shepherd	Shepherd Racing Ventures	Chevrolet	54.066	177.117	-	-
24	05	John Wes Townley (i)	Athenian Motorsports	Chevrolet	54.114	176.960	-	-
25	90	Mario Gosselin	DGM Racing	Chevrolet	54.125	176.924	-	-
26	01	Ryan Preece (R)	JD Motorsports	Chevrolet	54.241	176.545	-	-
27	10	Jeff Green	TriStar Motorsports	Toyota	54.361	176.156	-	-
28	07	Ray Black Jr. (R)	SS-Green Light Racing	Chevrolet	54.416	175.978	-	-
29	4	Ross Chastain	JD Motorsports	Chevrolet	54.436	175.913	-	-
30	25	Chris Cockrum	Chris Cockrum Racing	Chevrolet	54.438	175.907	-	-
31	40	Carl Long	MBM Motorsports	Dodge	54.445	175.884	-	-
32	13	John Jackson	MBM Motorsports	Toyota	54.496	175.719	-	-
33	85	Bobby Gerhart	Bobby Gerhart Racing	Chevrolet	54.587	175.426	-	-
Qualified by owner's points
34	51	Jeremy Clements	Jeremy Clements Racing	Chevrolet	54.716	175.013	-	-
35	0	Garrett Smithley (R)	JD Motorsports	Chevrolet	55.037	173.992	-	-
36	97	Ryan Ellis	Obaika Racing	Chevrolet	55.151	173.632	-	-
37	52	Joey Gase	Jimmy Means Racing	Chevrolet	55.285	173.212	-	-
38	39	Ryan Sieg	RSS Racing	Chevrolet	55.484	172.590	-	-
39	78	B. J. McLeod (R)	B. J. McLeod Motorsports	Ford	55.513	172.500	-	-
40	15	Travis Kvapil (i)	Rick Ware Racing	Ford	55.911	171.272	-	-
Failed to qualify
41	93	Josh Reaume	RSS Racing	Chevrolet	54.659	175.195	-	-
42	70	Derrike Cope	Derrike Cope Racing	Chevrolet	54.675	175.144	-	-
43	74	Mike Harmon	Mike Harmon Racing	Dodge	55.107	173.771	-	-
Official qualifying results
Official starting lineup

== Race results ==
Fin	St	#	Driver	Team	Make	Laps	Led	Status	Pts
1	9	1	Elliott Sadler	JR Motorsports	Chevrolet	116	1	Running	44
2	18	7	Justin Allgaier	JR Motorsports	Chevrolet	116	0	Running	39
3	11	48	Brennan Poole (R)	Chip Ganassi Racing	Chevrolet	116	5	Running	39
4	34	51	Jeremy Clements	Jeremy Clements Racing	Chevrolet	116	7	Running	38
5	6	62	Brendan Gaughan	Richard Childress Racing	Chevrolet	116	1	Running	37
6	3	2	Austin Dillon (i)	Richard Childress Racing	Chevrolet	116	7	Running	0
7	2	19	Daniel Suárez	Joe Gibbs Racing	Toyota	116	2	Running	35
8	1	18	Matt Tifft (i)	Joe Gibbs Racing	Toyota	116	21	Running	0
9	14	88	Chase Elliott (i)	JR Motorsports	Chevrolet	116	7	Running	0
10	17	98	Aric Almirola (i)	Biagi-DenBeste Racing	Ford	116	0	Running	0
11	20	42	Justin Marks	Chip Ganassi Racing	Chevrolet	116	0	Running	30
12	35	0	Garrett Smithley (R)	JD Motorsports	Chevrolet	116	0	Running	29
13	15	6	Bubba Wallace	Roush Fenway Racing	Ford	116	0	Running	28
14	19	14	Benny Gordon	TriStar Motorsports	Toyota	116	0	Running	27
15	26	01	Ryan Preece (R)	JD Motorsports	Chevrolet	116	0	Running	26
16	10	44	J. J. Yeley	TriStar Motorsports	Toyota	116	0	Running	25
17	29	4	Ross Chastain	JD Motorsports	Chevrolet	116	0	Running	24
18	12	43	Jeb Burton	Richard Petty Motorsports	Ford	116	0	Running	23
19	16	33	Brandon Jones (R)	Richard Childress Racing	Chevrolet	116	36	Running	24
20	5	3	Ty Dillon	Richard Childress Racing	Chevrolet	116	0	Running	21
21	38	39	Ryan Sieg	RSS Racing	Chevrolet	116	0	Running	20
22	4	20	Erik Jones (R)	Joe Gibbs Racing	Toyota	116	0	Running	19
23	21	24	Brandon McReynolds	JGL Racing	Toyota	116	0	Running	18
24	13	11	Blake Koch	Kaulig Racing	Chevrolet	116	1	Running	18
25	40	15	Travis Kvapil (i)	Rick Ware Racing	Ford	116	0	Running	0
26	24	05	John Wes Townley (i)	Athenian Motorsports	Chevrolet	116	0	Running	0
27	8	22	Joey Logano (i)	Team Penske	Ford	115	19	Running	0
28	25	90	Mario Gosselin	DGM Racing	Chevrolet	115	0	Running	13
29	28	07	Ray Black Jr. (R)	SS-Green Light Racing	Chevrolet	115	0	Running	12
30	31	40	Carl Long	MBM Motorsports	Dodge	115	0	Running	11
31	7	16	Ryan Reed	Roush Fenway Racing	Ford	113	8	Running	11
32	32	13	John Jackson	MBM Motorsports	Toyota	112	0	Running	9
33	33	85	Bobby Gerhart	Bobby Gerhart Racing	Chevrolet	111	0	Running	8
34	22	28	Dakoda Armstrong	JGL Racing	Toyota	82	0	Electrical	7
35	36	97	Ryan Ellis	Obaika Racing	Chevrolet	81	0	Engine	6
36	39	78	B. J. McLeod (R)	B. J. McLeod Motorsports	Ford	39	0	Engine	5
37	30	25	Chris Cockrum	Chris Cockrum Racing	Chevrolet	30	0	Accident	4
38	37	52	Joey Gase	Jimmy Means Racing	Chevrolet	30	0	Accident	3
39	23	89	Morgan Shepherd	Shepherd Racing Ventures	Chevrolet	27	1	Rear Gear	3
40	27	10	Jeff Green	TriStar Motorsports	Toyota	2	0	Suspension	1
Failed to qualify
41		93	Josh Reaume	RSS Racing	Chevrolet				
42		70	Derrike Cope	Derrike Cope Racing	Chevrolet				
43		74	Mike Harmon	Mike Harmon Racing	Dodge				
Official race results

== Standings after the race ==
Drivers' Championship standings

	Pos	Driver	Points
1	1	Elliott Sadler	314
1	2	Daniel Suárez	314 (-0)
	3	Ty Dillon	281 (–33)
3	4	Justin Allgaier	280 (–34)
1	5	Brendan Gaughan	279 (–35)
2	6	Brandon Jones	273 (–41)
2	7	Erik Jones	263 (–51)
	8	Brennan Poole	251 (–63)
1	9	Bubba Wallace	229 (–85)
1	10	Ryan Reed	221 (–93)
	11	Jeb Burton	201 (–113)
	12	Ryan Sieg	197 (–117)
Official driver's standings

- Note: Only the first 12 positions are included for the driver standings.

Previous race: 2016 ToyotaCare 250	NASCAR Xfinity Series; 2016 season	Next race: 2016 Ollie's Bargain Outlet 200
