= 2016 Alpha Energy Solutions 250 =

3rd race of the 2016 NASCAR Camping World Truck Series

Race details
- Race 3 of 23 of the 2016 NASCAR Camping World Truck Series
- Date: April 2, 2016
- Official name: 22nd Annual Alpha Energy Solutions 250
- Location: Martinsville Speedway, Ridgeway, Virginia
- Course: Permanent racing facility
- Course length: 0.526 miles (0.847 km)
- Distance: 255 laps, 134.1 mi (215.861 km)
- Scheduled distance: 250 laps, 131.5 mi (211.628 km)
- Average speed: 61.811 miles per hour (99.475 km/h)

Pole position
Driver	Ben Rhodes	ThorSport Racing
- Time: 19.659

Most laps led
Driver	Kyle Busch	Kyle Busch Motorsports
- Laps: 123

Winner
No. 18	Kyle Busch	Kyle Busch Motorsports

Television in the United States
- Network: FS1
- Announcers: Vince Welch, Phil Parsons, and Michael Waltrip

Radio in the United States
- Radio: MRN

The 2016 Alpha Energy Solutions 250 was the 3rd stock car race of the 2016 NASCAR Camping World Truck Series, and the 22nd iteration of the event. The race was held on Saturday, April 2, 2016, in Ridgeway, Virginia at Martinsville Speedway, a 0.526 mile (0.847 km) permanent paperclip shaped short track. The race was increased from 250 laps to 255 laps, due to a NASCAR overtime finish. Kyle Busch, driving for his team, Kyle Busch Motorsports, held off John Hunter Nemechek on the final restart, and earned his 45th career NASCAR Camping World Truck Series win, along with his first of the season. To fill out the podium, William Byron, also driving for Kyle Busch Motorsports, would finish in 3rd, respectively.

== Background ==
The layout of Martinsville Speedway, the venue where the race was held.

Martinsville Speedway is a NASCAR-owned stock car racing short track in Ridgeway, Virginia, just south of Martinsville. At 0.526 miles (847 m) in length, it is the shortest track in the NASCAR Cup Series. The track was also one of the first paved oval tracks in stock car racing, being built in 1947 by partners H. Clay Earles, Henry Lawrence, and Sam Rice, nearly a year before NASCAR was officially formed. It is also the only race track that has been on the NASCAR circuit from its beginning in 1948. Along with this, Martinsville is the only oval track on the NASCAR circuit to have asphalt surfaces on the straightaways and concrete to cover the turns.

=== Entry list ===
- (R) denotes rookie driver.
- (i) denotes driver who is ineligible for series driver points.

#	Driver	Team	Make	Sponsor
00	Cole Custer (R)	JR Motorsports	Chevrolet	Haas Automation
1	Bryce Napier	MAKE Motorsports	Chevrolet	Lilly Trucking
02	Tyler Young	Young's Motorsports	Chevrolet	Randco, Young's Building Systems
4	Christopher Bell (R)	Kyle Busch Motorsports	Toyota	JBL
05	John Wes Townley	Athenian Motorsports	Chevrolet	Zaxby's
6	Norm Benning	Norm Benning Racing	Chevrolet	Norm Benning Racing
07	Shane Lee	SS-Green Light Racing	Chevrolet	LeeBoy
8	John Hunter Nemechek	NEMCO Motorsports	Chevrolet	NEMCO Motorsports
9	William Byron (R)	Kyle Busch Motorsports	Toyota	Liberty University
10	Claire Decker	Jennifer Jo Cobb Racing	Chevrolet	Amsoil
11	Ben Kennedy	Red Horse Racing	Toyota	Jacob Companies
13	Cameron Hayley	ThorSport Racing	Toyota	Cabinets by Hayley
14	Natalie Decker	MAKE Motorsports	Chevrolet	CorvetteParts.net
17	Timothy Peters	Red Horse Racing	Toyota	Red Horse Racing
18	Kyle Busch (i)	Kyle Busch Motorsports	Toyota	Toyota
19	Daniel Hemric	Brad Keselowski Racing	Ford	California Clean Power
21	Johnny Sauter	GMS Racing	Chevrolet	Smokey Mountain Herbal Snuff
22	Austin Wayne Self (R)	AM Racing	Toyota	AM Technical Solutions
23	Spencer Gallagher	GMS Racing	Chevrolet	Alamo Rent a Car
24	Kyle Larson (i)	GMS Racing	Chevrolet	McDonald's
29	Tyler Reddick	Brad Keselowski Racing	Ford	Cooper-Standard Automotive
32	Justin Haley	Braun Motorsports	Toyota	Braun Auto Group
33	Kaz Grala	GMS Racing	Chevrolet	Allegiant Travel Company
41	Ben Rhodes (R)	ThorSport Racing	Toyota	Alpha Energy Solutions
44	Tommy Joe Martins (Note: Driver changed to Austin Wayne Self for the race after Self failed to qualify.)	Martins Motorsports	Chevrolet	Diamond Gusset Jeans
49	Timmy Hill	Premium Motorsports	Chevrolet	JEFA Tech
50	Travis Kvapil	MAKE Motorsports	Chevrolet	CorvetteParts.net
51	Daniel Suárez (i)	Kyle Busch Motorsports	Toyota	Arris
63	Spencer Boyd	MB Motorsports	Chevrolet	Go-Parts.com
66	Jordan Anderson	Bolen Motorsports	Chevrolet	Bolen Motorsports
71	Mike Bliss	Contreras Motorsports	Chevrolet	RaceTrac
74	Paige Decker	Mike Harmon Racing	Ram	Best Western
78	Chris Fontaine	Glenden Enterprises	Toyota	Glenden Enterprises
81	Ryan Truex	Hattori Racing Enterprises	Toyota	Toyota Osaka Parts Distribution
86	Brandon Brown	Brandonbilt Motorsports	Chevrolet	Coastal Carolina University
88	Matt Crafton	ThorSport Racing	Toyota	Ideal Door, Menards
92	Parker Kligerman	RBR Enterprises	Ford	Black's Tire Service, Advance Auto Parts
98	Rico Abreu (R)	ThorSport Racing	Toyota	Safelite, Curb Records
Official entry list

== Practice ==
=== First practice ===
The first practice session was held on Friday, April 1, at 10:00 AM EST, and would last for 55 minutes. William Byron, driving for Kyle Busch Motorsports, would set the fastest time in the session, with a lap of 19.868, and an average speed of 95.309 mph (153.385 km/h).

Pos.	#	Driver	Team	Make	Time	Speed
1	9	William Byron (R)	Kyle Busch Motorsports	Toyota	19.868	95.309
2	17	Timothy Peters	Red Horse Racing	Toyota	19.995	94.704
3	18	Kyle Busch (i)	Kyle Busch Motorsports	Toyota	20.104	94.190
Full first practice results

=== Second practice ===
The second practice session was held on Friday, April 1, at 12:30 PM EST, and would last for 1 hour and 25 minutes. Ben Rhodes, driving for ThorSport Racing, would set the fastest time in the session, with a lap of 19.839, and an average speed of 95.448 mph (153.609 km/h).

Pos.	#	Driver	Team	Make	Time	Speed
1	41	Ben Rhodes (R)	ThorSport Racing	Toyota	19.839	95.448
2	9	William Byron (R)	Kyle Busch Motorsports	Toyota	19.856	95.367
3	00	Cole Custer (R)	JR Motorsports	Chevrolet	19.901	95.151
Full second practice results

=== Final practice ===
The final practice session was held on Friday, April 1, at 3:00 PM EST, and would last for 50 minutes. Cole Custer, driving for JR Motorsports, would set the fastest time in the session, with a lap of 19.788, and an average speed of 95.694 mph (154.005 km/h).

Pos.	#	Driver	Team	Make	Time	Speed
1	00	Cole Custer (R)	JR Motorsports	Chevrolet	19.788	95.694
2	8	John Hunter Nemechek	NEMCO Motorsports	Chevrolet	19.826	95.511
3	41	Ben Rhodes (R)	ThorSport Racing	Toyota	19.837	95.458
Full final practice results

== Qualifying ==
Qualifying was held on Saturday, April 2, at 11:15 AM EST. Since Martinsville Speedway is under 1.5 miles (2.4 km) in length, the qualifying system was a multi-car system that included three rounds. The first round was 15 minutes, where every driver would be able to set a lap within the 15 minutes. Then, the second round would consist of the fastest 24 cars in Round 1, and drivers would have 10 minutes to set a lap. Round 3 consisted of the fastest 12 drivers from Round 2, and the drivers would have 5 minutes to set a time. Whoever was fastest in Round 3 would win the pole.

Ben Rhodes, driving for ThorSport Racing, would score the pole for the race, with a lap of 19.659, and an average speed of 96.322 mph (155.015 km/h) in the third round.

Austin Wayne Self, Jordan Anderson, Travis Kvapil, Norm Benning, Chris Fontaine, and Natalie Decker would fail to qualify.

=== Full qualifying results ===
Pos.	#	Driver	Team	Make	Time (R1)	Speed (R1)	Time (R2)	Speed (R2)	Time (R3)	Speed (R3)
1	41	Ben Rhodes (R)	ThorSport Racing	Toyota	19.770	95.781	19.710	96.073	19.659	96.322
2	18	Kyle Busch (i)	Kyle Busch Motorsports	Toyota	19.795	95.661	19.722	96.015	19.730	95.976
3	21	Johnny Sauter	GMS Racing	Chevrolet	20.002	94.671	19.802	95.627	19.753	95.864
4	13	Cameron Hayley	ThorSport Racing	Toyota	19.838	95.838	19.774	95.762	19.757	95.845
5	24	Kyle Larson (i)	GMS Racing	Chevrolet	19.755	95.854	19.869	95.304	19.775	95.757
6	51	Daniel Suárez (i)	Kyle Busch Motorsports	Toyota	20.036	94.510	19.777	95.748	19.780	95.733
7	9	William Byron (R)	Kyle Busch Motorsports	Toyota	19.885	95.228	19.881	95.247	19.790	95.685
8	8	John Hunter Nemechek	NEMCO Motorsports	Chevrolet	19.996	94.699	19.798	95.646	19.800	95.636
9	29	Tyler Reddick	Brad Keselowski Racing	Ford	19.931	95.008	19.844	95.424	19.811	95.583
10	88	Matt Crafton	ThorSport Racing	Toyota	19.900	95.156	19.836	95.463	19.882	95.242
11	23	Spencer Gallagher	GMS Racing	Chevrolet	19.959	94.874	19.775	95.757	19.903	95.141
12	00	Cole Custer (R)	JR Motorsports	Chevrolet	19.839	95.448	19.800	95.636	19.938	94.974
Eliminated in Round 2
13	02	Tyler Young	Young's Motorsports	Chevrolet	20.040	94.491	19.894	95.184	-	-
14	4	Christopher Bell (R)	Kyle Busch Motorsports	Toyota	20.014	94.614	19.898	95.165	-	-
15	11	Ben Kennedy	Red Horse Racing	Toyota	19.998	94.689	19.899	95.161	-	-
16	17	Timothy Peters	Red Horse Racing	Toyota	20.012	94.623	19.912	95.098	-	-
17	19	Daniel Hemric	Brad Keselowski Racing	Ford	20.081	94.298	19.917	95.075	-	-
18	81	Ryan Truex	Hattori Racing Enterprises	Toyota	19.965	94.846	19.924	95.041	-	-
19	33	Kaz Grala	GMS Racing	Chevrolet	20.058	94.406	19.927	95.027	-	-
20	98	Rico Abreu (R)	ThorSport Racing	Toyota	20.010	94.633	19.945	94.941	-	-
21	05	John Wes Townley	Athenian Motorsports	Chevrolet	20.051	94.439	20.027	94.552	-	-
22	32	Justin Haley	Braun Motorsports	Toyota	20.057	94.411	20.095	94.232	-	-
23	86	Brandon Brown	Brandonbilt Motorsports	Chevrolet	20.081	94.298	20.124	94.097	-	-
24	44	Tommy Joe Martins	Martins Motorsports	Chevrolet	19.927	95.027	-	-	-	-
Eliminated in Round 1
25	92	Parker Kligerman	RBR Enterprises	Ford	20.157	93.943	-	-	-	-
26	71	Mike Bliss	Contreras Motorsports	Chevrolet	20.193	93.775	-	-	-	-
27	63	Spencer Boyd	MB Motorsports	Ram	20.202	93.733	-	-	-	-
Qualified by owner's points
28	07	Shane Lee	SS-Green Light Racing	Chevrolet	20.218	93.659	-	-	-	-
29	49	Timmy Hill	Premium Motorsports	Chevrolet	20.473	92.493	-	-	-	-
30	74	Paige Decker	Mike Harmon Racing	Ram	20.496	92.389	-	-	-	-
31	10	Claire Decker	Jennifer Jo Cobb Racing	Chevrolet	20.574	92.038	-	-	-	-
32	1	Bryce Napier	MAKE Motorsports	Chevrolet	20.839	90.868	-	-	-	-
Failed to qualify
33	22	Austin Wayne Self (R)	AM Racing	Toyota	20.212	93.687	-	-	-	-
34	66	Jordan Anderson	Bolen Motorsports	Chevrolet	20.242	93.548	-	-	-	-
35	50	Travis Kvapil	MAKE Motorsports	Chevrolet	20.298	93.290	-	-	-	-
36	6	Norm Benning	Norm Benning Racing	Chevrolet	20.397	92.837	-	-	-	-
37	78	Chris Fontaine	Glenden Enterprises	Toyota	20.466	92.524	-	-	-	-
38	14	Natalie Decker	MAKE Motorsports	Chevrolet	20.922	90.508	-	-	-	-
Official qualifying results
Official starting lineup

== Race results ==
Fin	St	#	Driver	Team	Make	Laps	Led	Status	Pts
1	2	18	Kyle Busch (i)	Kyle Busch Motorsports	Toyota	255	123	Running	0
2	8	8	John Hunter Nemechek	NEMCO Motorsports	Chevrolet	255	0	Running	31
3	7	9	William Byron (R)	Kyle Busch Motorsports	Toyota	255	0	Running	30
4	5	24	Kyle Larson (i)	GMS Racing	Chevrolet	255	79	Running	0
5	16	17	Timothy Peters	Red Horse Racing	Toyota	255	0	Running	28
6	11	23	Spencer Gallagher	GMS Racing	Chevrolet	255	0	Running	27
7	10	88	Matt Crafton	ThorSport Racing	Toyota	255	0	Running	26
8	25	92	Parker Kligerman	RBR Enterprises	Ford	255	0	Running	25
9	4	13	Cameron Hayley	ThorSport Racing	Toyota	255	11	Running	25
10	20	98	Rico Abreu (R)	ThorSport Racing	Toyota	255	0	Running	23
11	15	11	Ben Kennedy	Red Horse Racing	Toyota	255	0	Running	22
12	18	81	Ryan Truex	Hattori Racing Enterprises	Toyota	255	0	Running	21
13	13	02	Tyler Young	Young's Motorsports	Chevrolet	255	0	Running	20
14	23	86	Brandon Brown	Brandonbilt Motorsports	Chevrolet	255	0	Running	19
15	24	44	Austin Wayne Self (R)	Martins Motorsports	Toyota	255	0	Running	18
16	1	41	Ben Rhodes (R)	ThorSport Racing	Toyota	255	42	Running	18
17	28	07	Shane Lee	SS-Green Light Racing	Chevrolet	255	0	Running	16
18	6	51	Daniel Suárez (i)	Kyle Busch Motorsports	Toyota	255	0	Running	0
19	14	4	Christopher Bell (R)	Kyle Busch Motorsports	Toyota	255	0	Running	14
20	9	29	Tyler Reddick	Brad Keselowski Racing	Ford	255	0	Running	13
21	21	05	John Wes Townley	Athenian Motorsports	Chevrolet	255	0	Running	12
22	17	19	Daniel Hemric	Brad Keselowski Racing	Ford	253	0	Running	11
23	32	1	Bryce Napier	MAKE Motorsports	Chevrolet	249	0	Running	10
24	29	49	Timmy Hill	Premium Motorsports	Chevrolet	248	0	Running	9
25	30	74	Paige Decker	Mike Harmon Racing	Ram	246	0	Running	8
26	22	32	Justin Haley	Braun Motorsports	Toyota	244	0	Accident	7
27	31	10	Claire Decker	Jennifer Jo Cobb Racing	Chevrolet	243	0	Running	6
28	27	63	Spencer Boyd	MB Motorsports	Ram	237	0	Accident	5
29	12	00	Cole Custer (R)	JR Motorsports	Chevrolet	235	0	Accident	4
30	26	71	Mike Bliss	Contreras Motorsports	Chevrolet	115	0	Electrical	3
31	19	33	Kaz Grala	GMS Racing	Chevrolet	91	0	Accident	2
32	3	21	Johnny Sauter	GMS Racing	Chevrolet	43	0	Accident	1
Official race results

== Standings after the race ==
Drivers' Championship standings

	Pos	Driver	Points
2	1	John Hunter Nemechek	83
1	2	Parker Kligerman	80 (-3)
1	3	Timothy Peters	77 (–6)
1	4	Tyler Young	67 (–16)
6	5	Cameron Hayley	66 (–17)
	6	Ryan Truex	66 (–17)
5	7	Daniel Hemric	65 (–18)
1	8	Brandon Brown	62 (–21)
Official driver's standings

- Note: Only the first 8 positions are included for the driver standings.

Previous race: 2016 Great Clips 200	NASCAR Camping World Truck Series; 2016 season	Next race: 2016 Toyota Tundra 250
