= Obaika Racing =

African stock car racing team

- Owner: Victor Obaika
- Base: Mooresville, North Carolina
- Series: Monster Energy NASCAR Cup Series; NASCAR Xfinity Series; NASCAR K&N Pro Series West
- Race drivers: Monster Energy Cup Series: 97. Xfinity Series: 97. TBA; K&N Pro Series West: 97. TBA
- Manufacturer: Toyota
- Opened: 2015
- Closed: 2020

Career
- Debut: 2015 2015 Alert Today Florida 300 (Daytona)
- Latest race: 2017 My Bariatric Solutions 300 (Texas)
- Races competed: 78
- Drivers' Championships: 0
- Race victories: 0
- Pole positions: 0

Obaika Racing was an African professional stock car racing team. The team was owned by African entrepreneur Victor Obaika. The team competed in the NASCAR Cup Series and NASCAR Xfinity Series.

The team formed in early 2015 and competed full-time in the Xfinity Series in 2015 and 2016. The team purchased some assets of BK Racing, a Monster Energy Cup Series team, in August 2018.

The team was based in Mooresville, North Carolina, thirty minutes away from Charlotte Motor Speedway. It was the first African-owned team in NASCAR.

== NASCAR Cup Series ==
In July 2018, Obaika obtained some equipment from the bankrupt NASCAR Cup Series team BK Racing for nearly $300,000. Around September 3, 2018, Obaika Racing owner Victor Obaika announced plans to race at some point in the remainder of the 2018 season.

=== Car No. 97 history ===
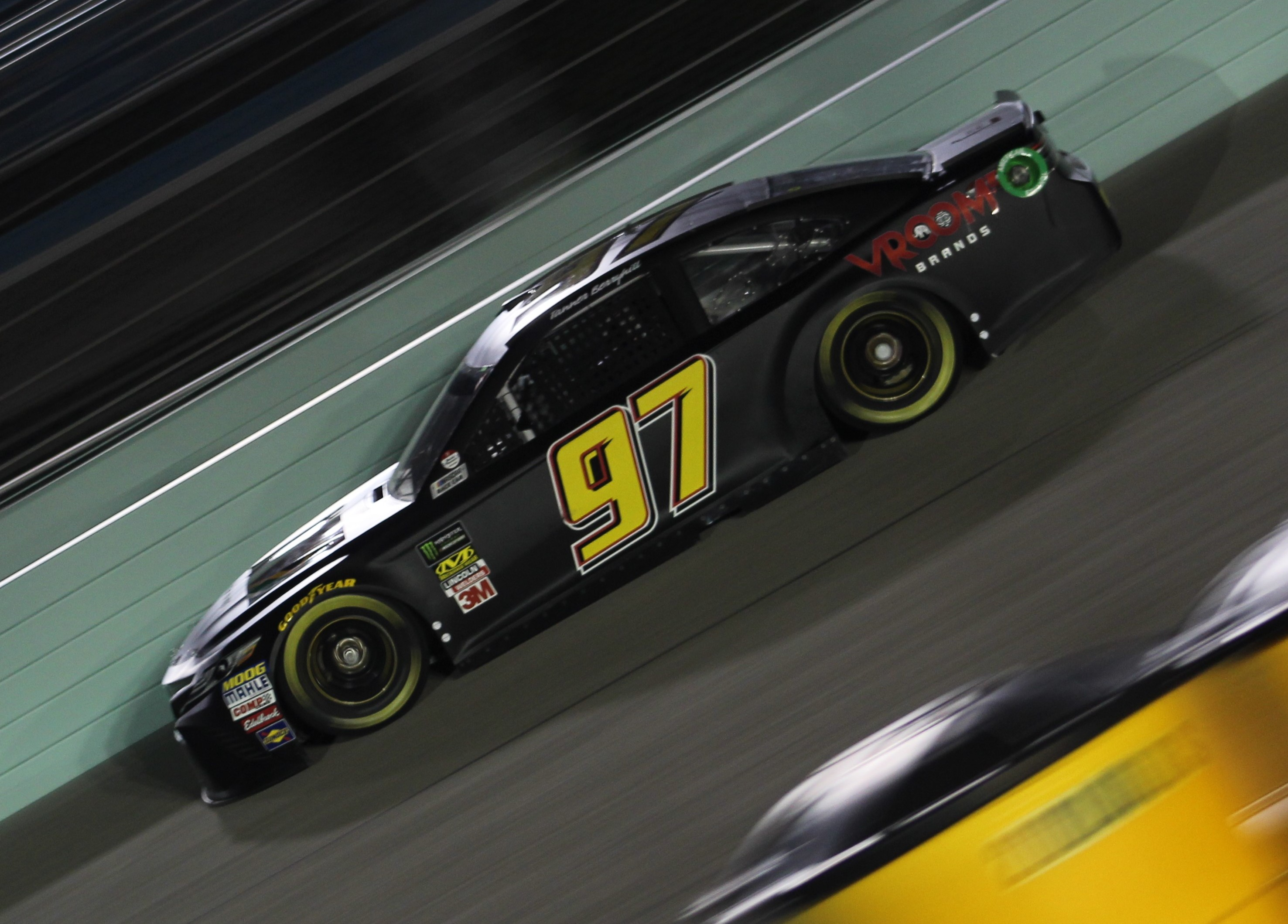
Tanner Berryhill in the No. 97 at Homestead–Miami Speedway in 2018

On October 5, 2018, Obaika announced that they would attempt their first ever Cup Series race at Talladega Superspeedway, fielding the No. 97 Vroombrands Toyota Camry for the 2018 1000Bulbs.com 500 with David Starr. He ultimately failed to qualify for the race. Obaika Racing later announced that they would attempt the last three races of the Cup Series season. The team made its official Cup Series debut at the 2018 AAA Texas 500, with Starr finishing at 39th place. Tanner Berryhill drove the No. 97 car at the 2018 Can-Am 500 at ISM Raceway and finished 31st. Berryhill drove the No. 97 again at Homestead-Miami Speedway and finished 38th.

Obaika Racing planned to run a full-time Cup car in 2019 with Berryhill. On February 8, 2019, Obaika Racing withdrew from the 2019 Daytona 500 qualifying due to various circumstances. They were briefly on the entry list for the spring race in Texas, before withdrawing once again. The team ultimately didn't compete in a Cup race in 2019, and eventually folded in 2020 due to the COVID-19 pandemic.

==== Car No. 97 Results ====
Year	Driver	No.	Make	1	2	3	4	5	6	7	8	9	10	11	12	13	14	15	16	17	18	19	20	21	22	23	24	25	26	27	28	29	30	31	32	33	34	35	36	MENCC	Pts
2018	David Starr	97	Toyota	DAY	ATL	LVS	PHO	CAL	MAR	TEX	BRI	RCH	TAL	DOV	KAN	CLT	POC	MCH	SON	CHI	DAY	KEN	NHA	POC	GLN	MCH	BRI	DAR	IND	LVS	RCH	ROV	DOV	TAL; DNQ	KAN	MAR	TEX; 39			46th	8
2018	Tanner Berryhill	97	Toyota																																			PHO; 31	HOM; 38	46th	8

== Xfinity Series ==
=== Car No. 77 history ===
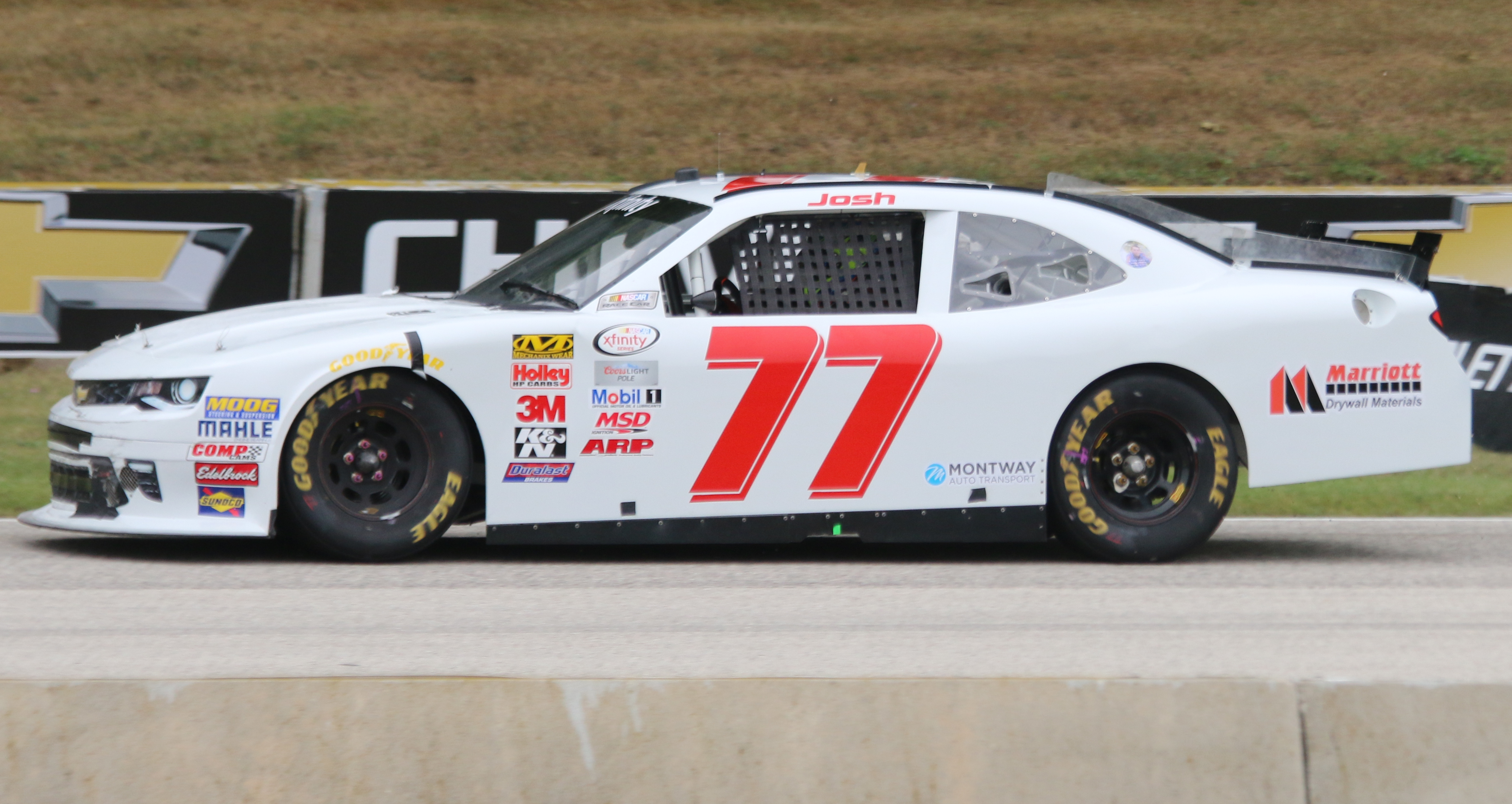
Josh Bilicki at Road America in 2016.

On July 16, 2016, at New Hampshire Motor Speedway, Obaika Racing introduced a second Chevrolet, the No. 77, also sponsored by VroomBrands. At Iowa Speedway, Claire Decker attempted to make her Xfinity Series debut driving this second Obaika car while her sister Paige ran the No. 97, but Claire failed to qualify on time and did not have owner points to fall back on. The No. 77 ran for much of the season's remainder, piloted by Ryan Ellis, Josh Bilicki, Austin Theriault, Matt Waltz, Jordan Anderson, TJ Bell, and Spencer Boyd.

The No. 77 team was announced to be a full-time team along with the No. 97 team, having Stephen Leicht as the driver. However, the No. 77 team withdrew before the Daytona race as Leicht moved over the No. 97 team. The team entered in the next three races, but withdraw before the qualifying in all but one (Las Vegas), where Josh Bilicki failed to qualify. The team returned to the entry list after a four-month hiatus at Mid-Ohio with Ohio native Gregory Vandersluis as a late entry. The team withdrew two days later. They were on the entry list for the Road America Xfinity Race but withdrew again. The team was on the entry list for the Charlotte October race, once again withdrawing.

==== Car No. 77 results ====
NASCAR Xfinity Series results
Year	Driver	No.	Make	1	2	3	4	5	6	7	8	9	10	11	12	13	14	15	16	17	18	19	20	21	22	23	24	25	26	27	28	29	30	31	32	33	Owners	Pts
2016	Claire Decker	77	Chevy	DAY	ATL	LVS	PHO	CAL	TEX	BRI	RCH	TAL	DOV	CLT	POC	MCH	IOW; DNQ	DAY	KEN																		46th	62
2016	T. J. Bell	77	Chevy																	NHA; 27	IND; DNQ	IOW; 38	GLN; 38														46th	62
2016	Jordan Anderson	77	Chevy																					MOH; 31	BRI												46th	62
2016	Josh Bilicki	77	Chevy																							ROA; 38	DAR										46th	62
2016	Austin Theriault	77	Chevy																									RCH; DNQ									46th	62
2016	Spencer Boyd	77	Chevy																										CHI; 35								46th	62
2016	Matt Waltz	77	Chevy																											KEN; 36	DOV; 35			TEX; 34			46th	62
2016	Ryan Ellis	77	Chevy																													CLT; Wth	KAN; 36		PHO; DNQ	HOM; DNQ	46th	62
2017	Stephen Leicht	77	Chevy	DAY	ATL; Wth																																57th	0
2017	Josh Bilicki	77	Chevy			LVS; DNQ	PHO; Wth	CAL	TEX	BRI	RCH	TAL	CLT	DOV	POC	MCH	IOW	DAY	KEN	NHA	IND	IOW	GLN														57th	0
2017	Gregory Vandersluis	77	Chevy																					MOH; Wth	BRI	ROA; Wth	DAR	RCH	CHI	KEN	DOV	CLT	KAN	TEX	PHO	HOM	57th	0

=== Car No. 97 history ===
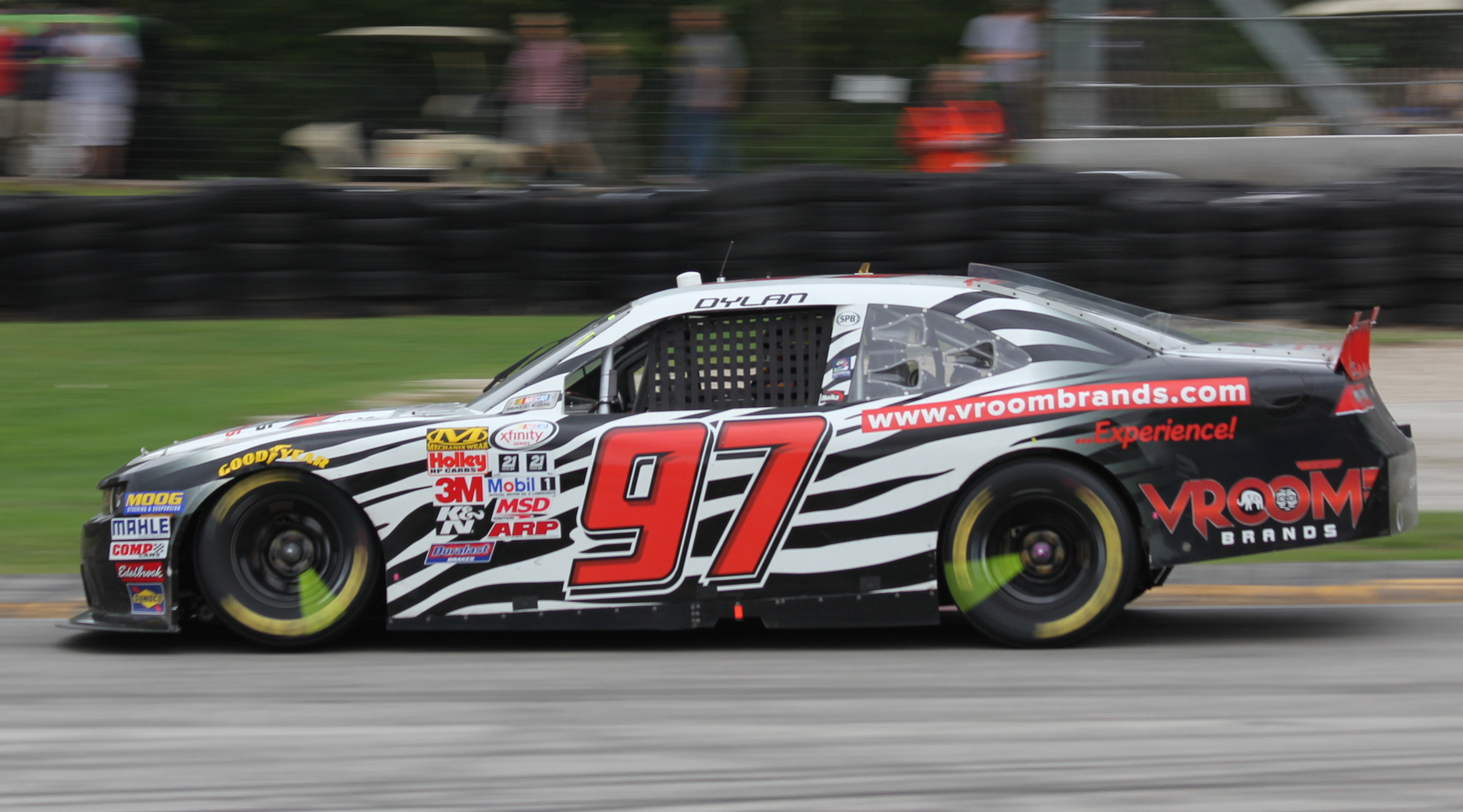
Dylan Kwasniewski at Road America in 2015.

Obaika Racing entered competition in 2015. The team signed driver Josh Reaume, who met team owner Victor Obaika while on humanitarian missions in Africa as a child. The 97 team debuted at the Daytona International Speedway in the Xfinity Series season-opening Alert Today Florida 300, with Reaume finishing 23rd. After three races, with one DNQ, Peyton Sellers replaced Reaume. In April 2015, the team secured their first sponsor vacation provider VroomBrands, which is owned by Obaika. VroomBrands wrapped the No. 97 in designs such as a Zebra representing their African safari package (debuted at Richmond International Raceway) and the Cheetah print representing their tours in Asia (debuted at Talladega Superspeedway). At the Winn-Dixie 300 at Talladega, Sellers scored the team's first top-20 finish, finishing 18th despite being involved in a ten-car wreck that sent cars spinning down pit road. Johanna Long replaced Sellers for the U.S. Cellular 250 at Iowa Speedway. After one more start for Sellers at Watkins Glen, the team introduced various drivers for the rest of the season. Dylan Kwasniewski debuted with the team in the Nationwide Children's Hospital at Mid-Ohio Sports Car Course, finishing 34th due to mechanical problems after running in the top 10. Kwasniewski would run the next two races for the team. Parker Kligerman drove the car in the VFW Sport Clips Help a Hero 200 at Darlington Raceway, Mason Mingus in the Furious 7 300 at Chicagoland Speedway, and Ryan Ellis in the Hisense 200 at the Dover International Speedway.

Magic Creeper appeared as the primary sponsor for the DAV 200 at the Phoenix International Raceway, with Kwasniewski as the driver. Obaika Racing completed the season in the top 30 in owner points.

On January 29, 2016, it was announced that Harrison Rhodes had been signed to drive the No. 97. Ryan Ellis, Alex Guenette, TJ Bell, Paige Decker, Matt Waltz, Josh Berry, Alli Owens, Jordan Anderson and Josh Bilicki all also raced for the team. The team also planned to expand to two cars.

In 2017, the team returned with Stephen Leicht driving in the early portion of the season but did not attempt a race after Bristol Motor Speedway in spring. Despite that, they were still shown in the game NASCAR Heat 2.

On September 21, 2018, it was announced that Obaika would attempt the Charlotte Roval race, with Tanner Berryhill driving the 97 car. The team, however, failed to make the race.

Obaika had planned to run a full-time Xfinity car in 2019, but nothing ever materialized.

==== Car No. 97 results ====
NASCAR Xfinity Series results
Year	Driver	No.	Make	1	2	3	4	5	6	7	8	9	10	11	12	13	14	15	16	17	18	19	20	21	22	23	24	25	26	27	28	29	30	31	32	33	Owners	Pts
2015	Josh Reaume	97	Chevy	DAY; 23	ATL; 38	LVS; DNQ																															30th	511
2015	Peyton Sellers	97	Chevy				PHO; 36	CAL; 29	TEX; 30	BRI; 32	RCH; 32	TAL; 18	IOW; 28	CLT; 28	DOV; 25	MCH; 24	CHI; 27	DAY; 16	KEN; 31	NHA; 26	IND; 35		GLN; 34														30th	511
2015	Johanna Long	97	Chevy																			IOW; 27															30th	511
2015	Dylan Kwasniewski	97	Chevy																					MOH; 34	BRI; 32	ROA; 33		RCH; 25		KEN; 17					PHO; 34		30th	511
2015	Parker Kligerman	97	Chevy																								DAR; 21										30th	511
2015	Mason Mingus	97	Chevy																										CHI; 24				KAN; 24	TEX; 24		HOM; 26	30th	511
2015	Ryan Ellis	97	Chevy																												DOV; 26	CLT; 23					30th	511
2016	Harrison Rhodes	97	Chevy	DAY; DNQ	ATL; 35	LVS; 32	PHO; 30	CAL; 35						CLT; 24																							34th	318
2016	Ryan Ellis	97	Chevy						TEX; 30	BRI; 35	RCH; 29	TAL; 35									IND; 30		GLN; 30							KEN; 22				TEX; 33			34th	318
2016	Alex Guenette	97	Chevy										DOV; 27		POC; 24			DAY; 38																			34th	318
2016	T. J. Bell	97	Chevy													MCH; 28			KEN; 28					MOH; 32	BRI; 31												34th	318
2016	Paige Decker	97	Chevy														IOW; 31									ROA; 31											34th	318
2016	Matt Waltz	97	Chevy																	NHA; 28		IOW; 35											KAN; 37				34th	318
2016	Josh Berry	97	Chevy																								DAR; 27										34th	318
2016	Alli Owens	97	Chevy																									RCH; 36									34th	318
2016	Jordan Anderson	97	Chevy																										CHI; 29		DOV; 37	CLT; 33					34th	318
2016	Josh Bilicki	97	Chevy																																PHO; 28	HOM; 34	34th	318
2017	Stephen Leicht	97	Chevy	DAY; DNQ	ATL; 38	LVS; 39	PHO; 37	CAL; 39	TEX; DNQ	BRI; Wth	RCH	TAL	CLT	DOV	POC	MCH	IOW	DAY	KEN	NHA	IND	IOW	GLN	MOH	BRI	ROA	DAR	RCH	CHI	KEN	DOV	CLT	KAN	TEX	PHO	HOM	53rd	4
2018	Tanner Berryhill	97	Chevy	DAY	ATL	LVS	PHO	CAL	TEX	BRI	RCH	TAL	DOV	CLT	POC	MCH	IOW	CHI	DAY	KEN	NHA	IOW	GLN	MOH	BRI	ROA	DAR	IND	LVS	RCH	ROV; DNQ	DOV	KAN	TEX	PHO	HOM	58th	0

== K&N Pro Series West ==
Obaika entered the 2018 race at Las Vegas Motor Speedway Dirt Track with South African driver Arnout Kok, marking the first K&N Pro Series West foray for both driver and team. However, the team withdrew from the race. Obaika paid another team to prepare a car for the race, but the car that was provided failed to pass inspection.
