= 2018 1000Bulbs.com 500 =

Race details
- Race 31 of 36 in the 2018 Monster Energy NASCAR Cup Series
- The 2018 1000Bulbs.com 500 program cover.
- Date: October 14, 2018
- Location: Talladega Superspeedway in Lincoln, Alabama
- Course: Permanent racing facility
- Course length: 2.66 miles (4.281 km)
- Distance: 193 laps, 513.38 mi (826.205 km)
- Scheduled distance: 188 laps, 500.08 mi (804.801 km)
- Average speed: 153.707 miles per hour (247.367 km/h)

Pole position
| Driver | Kurt Busch | Stewart–Haas Racing |
- Time: 48.906

Most laps led
| Driver | Kurt Busch | Stewart–Haas Racing |
- Laps: 108

Winner
| No. 10 | Aric Almirola | Stewart–Haas Racing |

Television in the United States
- Network: NBC
- Announcers: Rick Allen, Jeff Burton, Dale Earnhardt Jr. (booth), Steve Letarte and Dale Jarrett (NBC Peacock Pitbox)
- Nielsen ratings: 2.2 (Overnight)

Radio in the United States
- Radio: MRN
- Booth announcers: Joe Moore, Jeff Striegle and Rusty Wallace
- Turn announcers: Dave Moody (1 & 2), Mike Bagley (Backstretch) and Dan Hubbard (3 & 4)

The 2018 1000Bulbs.com 500 was a Monster Energy NASCAR Cup Series race that was held on October 14, 2018, at Talladega Superspeedway in Lincoln, Alabama. Contested over 193 laps – extended from 188 laps due to an overtime finish – on the 2.66-mile (4.28-kilometre) superspeedway, it was the 31st race of the 2018 Monster Energy NASCAR Cup Series season, the fifth race of the Playoffs, and second race of the Round of 12. This was a notable race for Stewart–Haas Racing, who dominated in qualifying and both stages, and ended up winning the race with driver Aric Almirola.

== Report ==
=== Background ===
Talladega Superspeedway, the track where the race was held.

Talladega Superspeedway, originally known as Alabama International Motor Superspeedway (AIMS), is a motorsports complex located in Lincoln, Alabama. The track is a tri-oval and was constructed in the 1960s by the International Speedway Corporation. Talladega is most known for its steep banking and the unique location of the start/finish line that's located just past the exit to pit road. Talladega is the longest NASCAR oval with a length of 2.66 miles (4.28 kilometres) for its tri-oval, slightly longer than the Daytona International Speedway, which is a 2.5-mile (4.0-kilometre) tri-oval.

==== Entry list ====
| No. | Driver | Team | Manufacturer |
|---|---|---|---|
| 00 | Joey Gase (i) | StarCom Racing | Chevrolet |
| 1 | Jamie McMurray | Chip Ganassi Racing | Chevrolet |
| 2 | Brad Keselowski | Team Penske | Ford |
| 3 | Austin Dillon | Richard Childress Racing | Chevrolet |
| 4 | Kevin Harvick | Stewart–Haas Racing | Ford |
| 6 | Trevor Bayne | Roush Fenway Racing | Ford |
| 7 | D. J. Kennington (i) | Premium Motorsports | Chevrolet |
| 9 | Chase Elliott | Hendrick Motorsports | Chevrolet |
| 10 | Aric Almirola | Stewart–Haas Racing | Ford |
| 11 | Denny Hamlin | Joe Gibbs Racing | Toyota |
| 12 | Ryan Blaney | Team Penske | Ford |
| 13 | Ty Dillon | Germain Racing | Chevrolet |
| 14 | Clint Bowyer | Stewart–Haas Racing | Ford |
| 15 | Ross Chastain (i) | Premium Motorsports | Chevrolet |
| 17 | Ricky Stenhouse Jr. | Roush Fenway Racing | Ford |
| 18 | Kyle Busch | Joe Gibbs Racing | Toyota |
| 19 | Daniel Suárez | Joe Gibbs Racing | Toyota |
| 20 | Erik Jones | Joe Gibbs Racing | Toyota |
| 21 | Paul Menard | Wood Brothers Racing | Ford |
| 22 | Joey Logano | Team Penske | Ford |
| 23 | J. J. Yeley (i) | BK Racing | Ford |
| 24 | William Byron (R) | Hendrick Motorsports | Chevrolet |
| 31 | Ryan Newman | Richard Childress Racing | Chevrolet |
| 32 | Matt DiBenedetto | Go Fas Racing | Ford |
| 34 | Michael McDowell | Front Row Motorsports | Ford |
| 37 | Chris Buescher | JTG Daugherty Racing | Chevrolet |
| 38 | David Ragan | Front Row Motorsports | Ford |
| 41 | Kurt Busch | Stewart–Haas Racing | Ford |
| 42 | Kyle Larson | Chip Ganassi Racing | Chevrolet |
| 43 | Bubba Wallace (R) | Richard Petty Motorsports | Chevrolet |
| 47 | A. J. Allmendinger | JTG Daugherty Racing | Chevrolet |
| 48 | Jimmie Johnson | Hendrick Motorsports | Chevrolet |
| 51 | Cody Ware | Rick Ware Racing | Chevrolet |
| 62 | Brendan Gaughan (i) | Beard Motorsports | Chevrolet |
| 72 | Corey LaJoie | TriStar Motorsports | Chevrolet |
| 78 | Martin Truex Jr. | Furniture Row Racing | Toyota |
| 88 | Alex Bowman | Hendrick Motorsports | Chevrolet |
| 95 | Regan Smith | Leavine Family Racing | Chevrolet |
| 96 | Jeffrey Earnhardt | Gaunt Brothers Racing | Toyota |
| 97 | David Starr (i) | Obaika Racing | Toyota |
| 99 | Landon Cassill (i) | StarCom Racing | Chevrolet |
Official entry list

== Final practice ==
Kevin Harvick was the fastest in the final practice session with a time of 46.889 seconds and a speed of 204.227 mph (328.671 km/h).

| Pos | No. | Driver | Team | Manufacturer | Time | Speed |
|---|---|---|---|---|---|---|
| 1 | 4 | Kevin Harvick | Stewart–Haas Racing | Ford | 46.889 | 204.227 |
| 2 | 10 | Aric Almirola | Stewart–Haas Racing | Ford | 46.951 | 203.957 |
| 3 | 22 | Joey Logano | Team Penske | Ford | 47.294 | 202.478 |
Official final practice results

== Qualifying ==
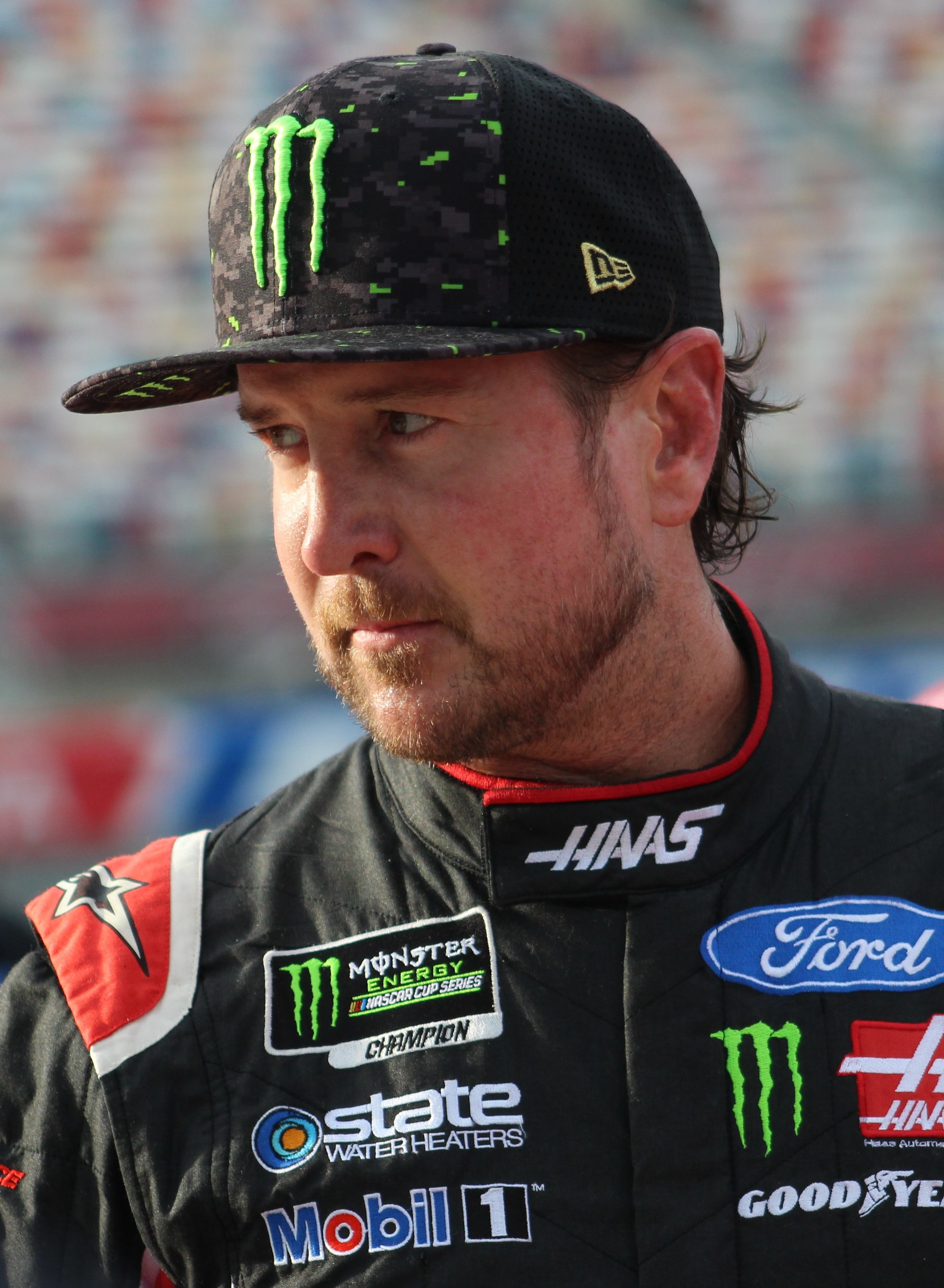
Kurt Busch scored the pole position.

Kurt Busch scored the pole for the race with a time of 48.906 and a speed of 195.804 mph (315.116 km/h).

=== Qualifying results ===
| Pos | No. | Driver | Team | Manufacturer | R1 | R2 |
|---|---|---|---|---|---|---|
| 1 | 41 | Kurt Busch | Stewart–Haas Racing | Ford | 49.051 | 48.906 |
| 2 | 14 | Clint Bowyer | Stewart–Haas Racing | Ford | 49.096 | 49.032 |
| 3 | 4 | Kevin Harvick | Stewart–Haas Racing | Ford | 49.195 | 49.061 |
| 4 | 10 | Aric Almirola | Stewart–Haas Racing | Ford | 49.238 | 49.216 |
| 5 | 9 | Chase Elliott | Hendrick Motorsports | Chevrolet | 49.299 | 49.260 |
| 6 | 48 | Jimmie Johnson | Hendrick Motorsports | Chevrolet | 49.319 | 49.317 |
| 7 | 88 | Alex Bowman | Hendrick Motorsports | Chevrolet | 49.311 | 49.420 |
| 8 | 24 | William Byron (R) | Hendrick Motorsports | Chevrolet | 49.395 | 49.420 |
| 9 | 18 | Kyle Busch | Joe Gibbs Racing | Toyota | 49.639 | 49.439 |
| 10 | 11 | Denny Hamlin | Joe Gibbs Racing | Toyota | 49.493 | 49.519 |
| 11 | 78 | Martin Truex Jr. | Furniture Row Racing | Toyota | 49.723 | 49.635 |
| 12 | 17 | Ricky Stenhouse Jr. | Roush Fenway Racing | Ford | 49.664 | 49.661 |
| 13 | 19 | Daniel Suárez | Joe Gibbs Racing | Toyota | 49.729 | — |
| 14 | 34 | Michael McDowell | Front Row Motorsports | Ford | 49.743 | — |
| 15 | 20 | Erik Jones | Joe Gibbs Racing | Toyota | 49.833 | — |
| 16 | 38 | David Ragan | Front Row Motorsports | Ford | 49.876 | — |
| 17 | 43 | Bubba Wallace (R) | Richard Petty Motorsports | Chevrolet | 49.892 | — |
| 18 | 2 | Brad Keselowski | Team Penske | Ford | 49.901 | — |
| 19 | 12 | Ryan Blaney | Team Penske | Ford | 49.945 | — |
| 20 | 22 | Joey Logano | Team Penske | Ford | 50.035 | — |
| 21 | 3 | Austin Dillon | Richard Childress Racing | Chevrolet | 50.085 | — |
| 22 | 31 | Ryan Newman | Richard Childress Racing | Chevrolet | 50.091 | — |
| 23 | 47 | A. J. Allmendinger | JTG Daugherty Racing | Chevrolet | 50.140 | — |
| 24 | 6 | Trevor Bayne | Roush Fenway Racing | Ford | 50.141 | — |
| 25 | 95 | Regan Smith | Leavine Family Racing | Chevrolet | 50.225 | — |
| 26 | 37 | Chris Buescher | JTG Daugherty Racing | Chevrolet | 50.228 | — |
| 27 | 32 | Matt DiBenedetto | Go Fas Racing | Ford | 50.416 | — |
| 28 | 62 | Brendan Gaughan (i) | Beard Motorsports | Chevrolet | 50.478 | — |
| 29 | 13 | Ty Dillon | Germain Racing | Chevrolet | 50.480 | — |
| 30 | 21 | Paul Menard | Wood Brothers Racing | Ford | 50.491 | — |
| 31 | 1 | Jamie McMurray | Chip Ganassi Racing | Chevrolet | 50.533 | — |
| 32 | 23 | J. J. Yeley (i) | BK Racing | Ford | 50.565 | — |
| 33 | 7 | D. J. Kennington (i) | Premium Motorsports | Chevrolet | 50.604 | — |
| 34 | 42 | Kyle Larson | Chip Ganassi Racing | Chevrolet | 50.739 | — |
| 35 | 96 | Jeffrey Earnhardt | Gaunt Brothers Racing | Toyota | 50.837 | — |
| 36 | 15 | Ross Chastain (i) | Premium Motorsports | Chevrolet | 51.217 | — |
| 37 | 00 | Joey Gase (i) | StarCom Racing | Chevrolet | 51.292 | — |
| 38 | 99 | Landon Cassill (i) | StarCom Racing | Chevrolet | 51.311 | — |
| 39 | 72 | Corey LaJoie (Note: LaJoie started from the rear after failing post-qualifying inspection.) | TriStar Motorsports | Chevrolet | 51.837 | — |
| 40 | 51 | Cody Ware | Rick Ware Racing | Chevrolet | 52.289 | — |
Did not qualify
| 41 | 97 | David Starr (i) | Obaika Racing | Toyota | 51.517 | — |
Official qualifying results

== Race ==
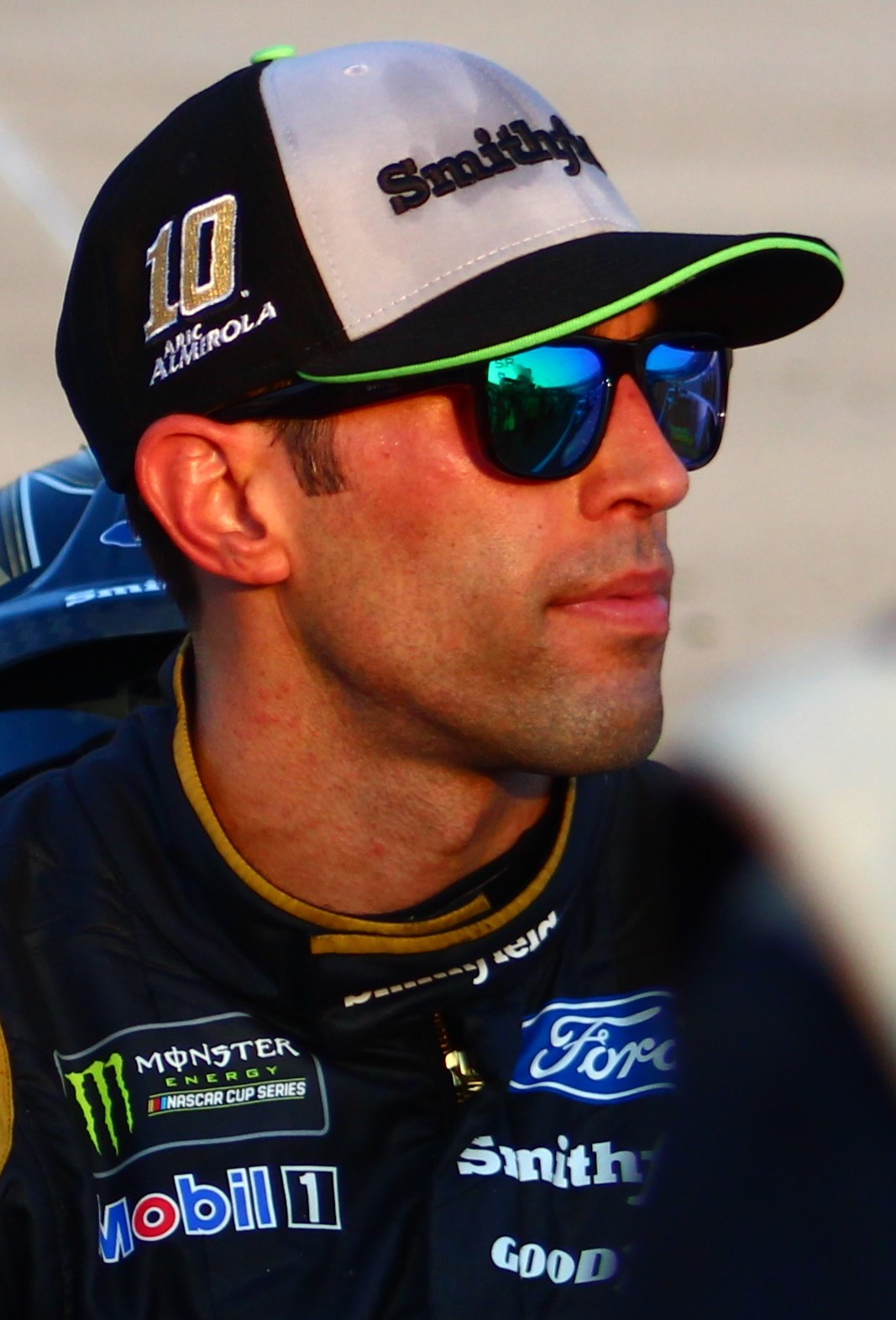
Aric Almirola won the race.

=== Stage results ===
Stage 1 Laps: 55

| Pos | No | Driver | Team | Manufacturer | Points |
|---|---|---|---|---|---|
| 1 | 41 | Kurt Busch | Stewart–Haas Racing | Ford | 10 |
| 2 | 14 | Clint Bowyer | Stewart–Haas Racing | Ford | 9 |
| 3 | 4 | Kevin Harvick | Stewart–Haas Racing | Ford | 8 |
| 4 | 10 | Aric Almirola | Stewart–Haas Racing | Ford | 7 |
| 5 | 22 | Joey Logano | Team Penske | Ford | 6 |
| 6 | 12 | Ryan Blaney | Team Penske | Ford | 5 |
| 7 | 9 | Chase Elliott | Hendrick Motorsports | Chevrolet | 4 |
| 8 | 11 | Denny Hamlin | Joe Gibbs Racing | Toyota | 3 |
| 9 | 88 | Alex Bowman | Hendrick Motorsports | Chevrolet | 2 |
| 10 | 13 | Ty Dillon | Germain Racing | Chevrolet | 1 |
Official stage one results

Stage 2 Laps: 55

| Pos | No | Driver | Team | Manufacturer | Points |
|---|---|---|---|---|---|
| 1 | 4 | Kevin Harvick | Stewart–Haas Racing | Ford | 10 |
| 2 | 14 | Clint Bowyer | Stewart–Haas Racing | Ford | 9 |
| 3 | 41 | Kurt Busch | Stewart–Haas Racing | Ford | 8 |
| 4 | 10 | Aric Almirola | Stewart–Haas Racing | Ford | 7 |
| 5 | 11 | Denny Hamlin | Joe Gibbs Racing | Toyota | 6 |
| 6 | 12 | Ryan Blaney | Team Penske | Ford | 5 |
| 7 | 18 | Kyle Busch | Joe Gibbs Racing | Toyota | 4 |
| 8 | 3 | Austin Dillon | Richard Childress Racing | Chevrolet | 3 |
| 9 | 22 | Joey Logano | Team Penske | Ford | 2 |
| 10 | 2 | Brad Keselowski | Team Penske | Ford | 1 |
Official stage two results

=== Final stage results ===
Stage 3 Laps: 78

| Pos | Grid | No | Driver | Team | Manufacturer | Laps | Points |
|---|---|---|---|---|---|---|---|
| 1 | 4 | 10 | Aric Almirola | Stewart–Haas Racing | Ford | 193 | 54 |
| 2 | 2 | 14 | Clint Bowyer | Stewart–Haas Racing | Ford | 193 | 53 |
| 3 | 12 | 17 | Ricky Stenhouse Jr. | Roush-Fenway Racing | Ford | 193 | 34 |
| 4 | 10 | 11 | Denny Hamlin | Joe Gibbs Racing | Toyota | 193 | 42 |
| 5 | 20 | 22 | Joey Logano | Team Penske | Ford | 193 | 40 |
| 6 | 23 | 47 | A. J. Allmendinger | JTG Daugherty Racing | Chevrolet | 193 | 31 |
| 7 | 6 | 48 | Jimmie Johnson | Hendrick Motorsports | Chevrolet | 193 | 30 |
| 8 | 15 | 20 | Erik Jones | Joe Gibbs Racing | Toyota | 193 | 29 |
| 9 | 30 | 21 | Paul Menard | Wood Brothers Racing | Ford | 193 | 28 |
| 10 | 25 | 95 | Regan Smith | Leavine Family Racing | Chevrolet | 193 | 27 |
| 11 | 34 | 42 | Kyle Larson | Chip Ganassi Racing | Chevrolet | 193 | 16 |
| 12 | 28 | 62 | Brendan Gaughan (i) | Beard Motorsports | Chevrolet | 193 | 0 |
| 13 | 24 | 6 | Trevor Bayne | Roush-Fenway Racing | Ford | 193 | 24 |
| 14 | 1 | 41 | Kurt Busch | Stewart–Haas Racing | Ford | 193 | 41 |
| 15 | 29 | 13 | Ty Dillon | Germain Racing | Chevrolet | 193 | 23 |
| 16 | 13 | 19 | Daniel Suárez | Joe Gibbs Racing | Toyota | 193 | 21 |
| 17 | 21 | 3 | Austin Dillon | Richard Childress Racing | Chevrolet | 193 | 23 |
| 18 | 37 | 00 | Joey Gase (i) | StarCom Racing | Chevrolet | 193 | 0 |
| 19 | 17 | 43 | Bubba Wallace (R) | Richard Petty Motorsports | Chevrolet | 193 | 18 |
| 20 | 8 | 24 | William Byron (R) | Hendrick Motorsports | Chevrolet | 193 | 17 |
| 21 | 26 | 37 | Chris Buescher | JTG Daugherty Racing | Chevrolet | 193 | 16 |
| 22 | 38 | 99 | Landon Cassill (i) | StarCom Racing | Chevrolet | 193 | 0 |
| 23 | 11 | 78 | Martin Truex Jr. | Furniture Row Racing | Toyota | 193 | 14 |
| 24 | 36 | 15 | Ross Chastain (i) | Premium Motorsports | Chevrolet | 193 | 0 |
| 25 | 22 | 31 | Ryan Newman | Richard Childress Racing | Chevrolet | 193 | 12 |
| 26 | 9 | 18 | Kyle Busch | Joe Gibbs Racing | Toyota | 193 | 15 |
| 27 | 18 | 2 | Brad Keselowski | Team Penske | Ford | 193 | 11 |
| 28 | 3 | 4 | Kevin Harvick | Stewart–Haas Racing | Ford | 193 | 27 |
| 29 | 19 | 12 | Ryan Blaney | Team Penske | Ford | 193 | 18 |
| 30 | 27 | 32 | Matt DiBenedetto | Go Fas Racing | Ford | 192 | 7 |
| 31 | 5 | 9 | Chase Elliott | Hendrick Motorsports | Chevrolet | 192 | 10 |
| 32 | 39 | 72 | Corey LaJoie | TriStar Motorsports | Chevrolet | 191 | 5 |
| 33 | 7 | 88 | Alex Bowman | Hendrick Motorsports | Chevrolet | 191 | 6 |
| 34 | 33 | 7 | D. J. Kennington (i) | Premium Motorsports | Chevrolet | 190 | 0 |
| 35 | 31 | 1 | Jamie McMurray | Chip Ganassi Racing | Chevrolet | 186 | 2 |
| 36 | 32 | 23 | J. J. Yeley (i) | BK Racing | Ford | 185 | 0 |
| 37 | 35 | 96 | Jeffrey Earnhardt | Gaunt Brothers Racing | Toyota | 185 | 1 |
| 38 | 40 | 51 | Cody Ware | Rick Ware Racing | Chevrolet | 185 | 1 |
| 39 | 16 | 38 | David Ragan | Front Row Motorsports | Ford | 173 | 1 |
| 40 | 14 | 34 | Michael McDowell | Front Row Motorsports | Ford | 155 | 1 |
Official race results

=== Race statistics ===
- Lead changes: 15 among 11 different drivers
- Cautions/Laps: 8 for 32 laps
- Red flags: 0
- Time of race: 3 hours, 20 minutes and 24 seconds
- Average speed: 153.707 miles per hour (247.367 km/h)

== Media ==
=== Television ===
NBC Sports covered the race on the television side. Rick Allen, Jeff Burton and six-time Talladega winner Dale Earnhardt Jr. called the race from the broadcast booth, with Steve Letarte and Dale Jarrett providing analysis from the NBC Peacock Pit Box on pit road. Dave Burns, Parker Kligerman, Marty Snider and Kelli Stavast reported from pit lane.

NBCSN
| Booth announcers | Pit reporters |
|---|---|
| Lap-by-lap: Rick Allen; Color commentator: Jeff Burton; Color commentator: Dale Earnhardt Jr. NBC Peacock Pitbox: Steve Letarte; NBC Peacock Pitbox: Dale Jarrett | Dave Burns; Parker Kligerman; Marty Snider; Kelli Stavast |

=== Radio ===
MRN covered the radio call for the race, which was simulcast on SiriusXM's NASCAR Radio channel.

MRN
| Booth announcers | Turn announcers | Pit reporters |
|---|---|---|
| Lead announcer: Joe Moore; Announcer: Jeff Striegle; Announcer: Rusty Wallace | Turns 1 & 2: Dave Moody; Backstretch: Mike Bagley; Turns 3 & 4: Dan Hubbard | Alex Hayden; Winston Kelley; Kim Coon; Steve Post |

== Standings after the race ==
| | Pos | Driver | Points |
|---|---|---|---|
| | 1 | Kevin Harvick | 3,128 |
| | 2 | Kyle Busch | 3,111 (−17) |
| 1 | 3 | Joey Logano | 3,104 (−24) |
| 2 | 4 | Kurt Busch | 3,095 (−33) |
| 4 | 5 | Aric Almirola | 3,087 (−41) |
| 4 | 6 | Clint Bowyer | 3,086 (−42) |
| 4 | 7 | Martin Truex Jr. | 3,083 (−45) |
| 3 | 8 | Chase Elliott | 3,066 (−62) |
| 2 | 9 | Brad Keselowski | 3,065 (−63) |
| 2 | 10 | Ryan Blaney | 3,061 (−67) |
| | 11 | Kyle Larson | 3,047 (−81) |
| | 12 | Alex Bowman | 3,015 (−113) |
| 2 | 13 | Denny Hamlin | 2,136 (−992) |
| | 14 | Jimmie Johnson | 2,128 (−1,000) |
| 2 | 15 | Austin Dillon | 2,124 (−1,004) |
| | 16 | Erik Jones | 2,108 (−1,020) |
Official driver's standings

Manufacturers' Championship standings

| Pos | Manufacturer | Points |
|---|---|---|
| 1 | Ford | 1,124 |
| 2 | Toyota | 1,108 (−16) |
| 3 | Chevrolet | 1,021 (−103) |
Official manufacturers' standings

- Note: Only the first 16 positions are included for the driver standings.

== Notes ==
| Previous race: 2018 Gander Outdoors 400 (Dover) | Monster Energy NASCAR Cup Series; 2018 season | Next race: 2018 Hollywood Casino 400 |
