= 2018 Hollywood Casino 400 =

Race details
- Race 32 of 36 in the 2018 Monster Energy NASCAR Cup Series
- Date: October 21, 2018
- Location: Kansas Speedway in Kansas City, Kansas
- Course: Permanent racing facility
- Course length: 1.5 miles (2.4 km)
- Distance: 267 laps, 400.5 mi (640.8 km)
- Average speed: 152.713 miles per hour (245.768 km/h)

Pole position
Driver	Joey Logano	Team Penske
- Time: 28.177

Most laps led
Driver	Joey Logano	Team Penske
- Laps: 100

Winner
No. 9	Chase Elliott	Hendrick Motorsports

Television in the United States
- Network: NBC
- Announcers: Rick Allen, Jeff Burton, Steve Letarte and Dale Earnhardt Jr.
- Nielsen ratings: 1.7/1.8 (Overnight)

Radio in the United States
- Radio: MRN
- Booth announcers: Joe Moore, Jeff Striegle and Rusty Wallace
- Turn announcers: Dave Moody (1 & 2) and Mike Bagley (3 & 4)

The 2018 Hollywood Casino 400 was a Monster Energy NASCAR Cup Series race held on October 21, 2018, at Kansas Speedway in Kansas City, Kansas. Contested over 267 laps on the 1.5 mile (2.4 km) intermediate speedway, it was the 32nd race of the 2018 Monster Energy NASCAR Cup Series season, sixth race of the Playoffs, and final race of the Round of 12.

== Report ==
=== Background ===
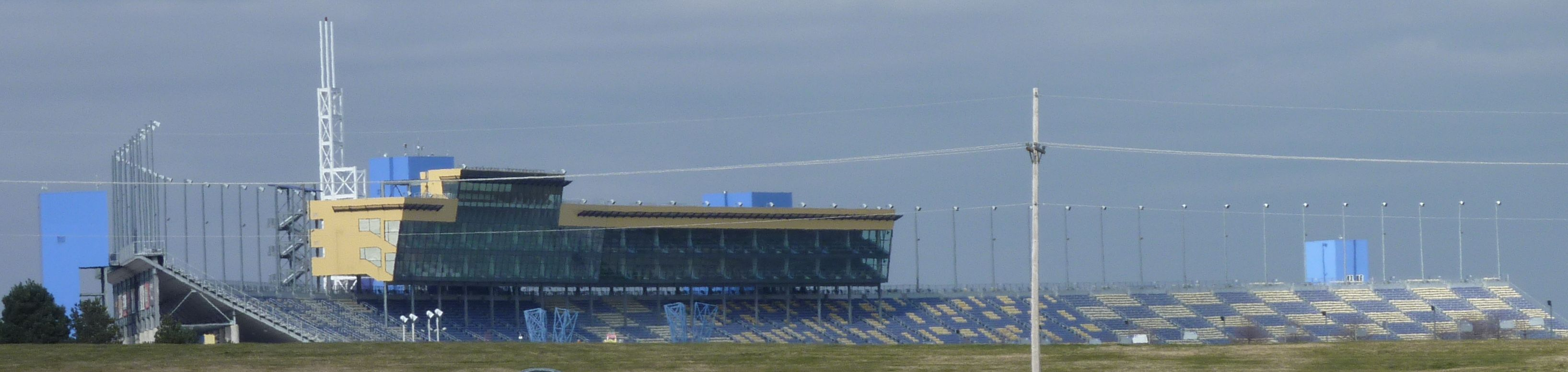
Kansas Speedway, the track where the race was held.

Kansas Speedway is a 1.5-mile (2.4 km) tri-oval race track in Kansas City, Kansas. It was built in 2001 and it currently hosts two annual NASCAR race weekends. The speedway is owned and operated by NASCAR.

==== Entry list ====
No.	Driver	Team	Manufacturer
00	Landon Cassill (i)	StarCom Racing	Chevrolet
1	Jamie McMurray	Chip Ganassi Racing	Chevrolet
2	Brad Keselowski	Team Penske	Ford
3	Austin Dillon	Richard Childress Racing	Chevrolet
4	Kevin Harvick	Stewart–Haas Racing	Ford
6	Trevor Bayne	Roush–Fenway Racing	Ford
7	Reed Sorenson	Premium Motorsports	Chevrolet
9	Chase Elliott	Hendrick Motorsports	Chevrolet
10	Aric Almirola	Stewart–Haas Racing	Ford
11	Denny Hamlin	Joe Gibbs Racing	Toyota
12	Ryan Blaney	Team Penske	Ford
13	Ty Dillon	Germain Racing	Chevrolet
14	Clint Bowyer	Stewart–Haas Racing	Ford
15	Ross Chastain (i)	Premium Motorsports	Chevrolet
17	Ricky Stenhouse Jr.	Roush–Fenway Racing	Ford
18	Kyle Busch	Joe Gibbs Racing	Toyota
19	Daniel Suárez	Joe Gibbs Racing	Toyota
20	Erik Jones	Joe Gibbs Racing	Toyota
21	Paul Menard	Wood Brothers Racing	Ford
22	Joey Logano	Team Penske	Ford
23	J. J. Yeley (i)	BK Racing	Toyota
24	William Byron (R)	Hendrick Motorsports	Chevrolet
31	Ryan Newman	Richard Childress Racing	Chevrolet
32	Matt DiBenedetto	Go Fas Racing	Ford
34	Michael McDowell	Front Row Motorsports	Ford
37	Chris Buescher	JTG Daugherty Racing	Chevrolet
38	David Ragan	Front Row Motorsports	Ford
41	Kurt Busch	Stewart–Haas Racing	Ford
42	Kyle Larson	Chip Ganassi Racing	Chevrolet
43	Bubba Wallace (R)	Richard Petty Motorsports	Chevrolet
47	A. J. Allmendinger	JTG Daugherty Racing	Chevrolet
48	Jimmie Johnson	Hendrick Motorsports	Chevrolet
51	B. J. McLeod (i)	Rick Ware Racing	Chevrolet
66	Timmy Hill (i)	MBM Motorsports	Toyota
72	Corey LaJoie	TriStar Motorsports	Chevrolet
78	Martin Truex Jr.	Furniture Row Racing	Toyota
88	Alex Bowman	Hendrick Motorsports	Chevrolet
95	Regan Smith	Leavine Family Racing	Chevrolet
96	Jeffrey Earnhardt	Gaunt Brothers Racing	Toyota
99	Kyle Weatherman	StarCom Racing	Chevrolet
Official entry list

== First practice ==
Ryan Blaney was the fastest in the first practice session with a time of 28.106 seconds and a speed of 192.130 mph (309.203 km/h).

Pos	No.	Driver	Team	Manufacturer	Time	Speed
1	12	Ryan Blaney	Team Penske	Ford	28.106	192.130
2	18	Kyle Busch	Joe Gibbs Racing	Toyota	28.159	191.768
3	4	Kevin Harvick	Stewart–Haas Racing	Ford	28.160	191.761
Official first practice results

== Qualifying ==
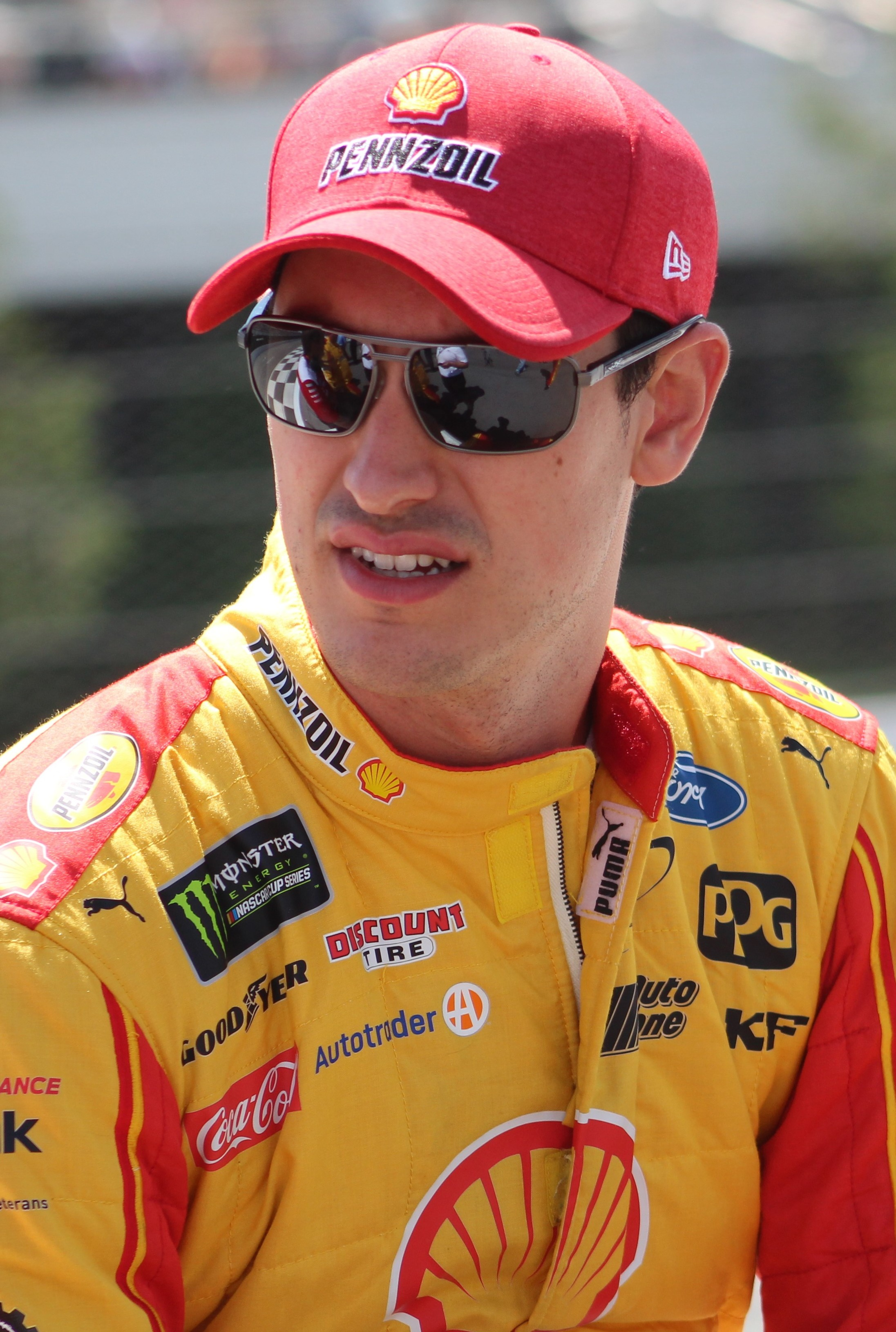
Joey Logano scored the pole position.

Joey Logano scored the pole for the race with a time of 28.177 and a speed of 191.646 mph (308.424 km/h).

=== Qualifying results ===
Pos	No.	Driver	Team	Manufacturer	R1	R2	R3
1	22	Joey Logano	Team Penske	Ford	28.327	28.271	28.177
2	4	Kevin Harvick	Stewart–Haas Racing	Ford	28.235	28.260	28.235
3	10	Aric Almirola	Stewart–Haas Racing	Ford	28.470	28.239	28.239
4	12	Ryan Blaney	Team Penske	Ford	28.460	28.298	28.282
5	2	Brad Keselowski	Team Penske	Ford	28.431	28.377	28.313
6	20	Erik Jones	Joe Gibbs Racing	Toyota	28.486	28.308	28.308
7	18	Kyle Busch	Joe Gibbs Racing	Toyota	28.271	28.338	28.271
8	19	Daniel Suárez	Joe Gibbs Racing	Toyota	28.677	28.373	28.354
9	11	Denny Hamlin	Joe Gibbs Racing	Toyota	28.734	28.408	28.408
10	88	Alex Bowman	Hendrick Motorsports	Chevrolet	28.548	28.383	28.383
11	41	Kurt Busch	Stewart–Haas Racing	Ford	28.382	28.314	28.314
12	78	Martin Truex Jr.	Furniture Row Racing	Toyota	28.373	28.352	28.352
13	9	Chase Elliott	Hendrick Motorsports	Chevrolet	28.506	28.417	—
14	14	Clint Bowyer	Stewart–Haas Racing	Ford	28.228	28.424	—
15	17	Ricky Stenhouse Jr.	Roush–Fenway Racing	Ford	28.598	28.453	—
16	31	Ryan Newman	Richard Childress Racing	Chevrolet	28.606	28.459	—
17	24	William Byron (R)	Hendrick Motorsports	Chevrolet	28.661	28.461	—
18	21	Paul Menard	Wood Brothers Racing	Ford	28.460	28.553	—
19	6	Trevor Bayne	Roush–Fenway Racing	Ford	28.736	28.557	—
20	1	Jamie McMurray	Chip Ganassi Racing	Chevrolet	28.650	28.599	—
21	37	Chris Buescher	JTG Daugherty Racing	Chevrolet	28.680	28.599	—
22	48	Jimmie Johnson	Hendrick Motorsports	Chevrolet	28.640	28.628	—
23	3	Austin Dillon	Richard Childress Racing	Chevrolet	28.529	28.640	—
24	34	Michael McDowell	Front Row Motorsports	Ford	28.697	28.740	—
25	47	A. J. Allmendinger	JTG Daugherty Racing	Chevrolet	28.767	—	—
26	95	Regan Smith	Leavine Family Racing	Chevrolet	28.805	—	—
27	42	Kyle Larson	Chip Ganassi Racing	Chevrolet	28.852	—	—
28	38	David Ragan	Front Row Motorsports	Ford	28.856	—	—
29	43	Bubba Wallace (R)	Richard Petty Motorsports	Chevrolet	28.946	—	—
30	13	Ty Dillon	Germain Racing	Chevrolet	29.020	—	—
31	32	Matt DiBenedetto	Go Fas Racing	Ford	29.093	—	—
32	15	Ross Chastain (i)	Premium Motorsports	Chevrolet	29.349	—	—
33	96	Jeffrey Earnhardt	Gaunt Brothers Racing	Toyota	29.468	—	—
34	72	Corey LaJoie	TriStar Motorsports	Chevrolet	29.486	—	—
35	00	Landon Cassill (i)	StarCom Racing	Chevrolet	29.625	—	—
36	23	J. J. Yeley (i)	BK Racing	Toyota	29.804	—	—
37	99	Kyle Weatherman	StarCom Racing	Chevrolet	29.892	—	—
38	51	B. J. McLeod (i)	Rick Ware Racing	Chevrolet	30.313	—	—
39	7	Reed Sorenson	Premium Motorsports	Chevrolet	30.356	—	—
40	66	Timmy Hill (i)	MBM Motorsports	Toyota	30.387	—	—
Official qualifying results

== Practice (post-qualifying) ==
=== Second practice ===
Aric Almirola was the fastest in the second practice session with a time of 28.926 seconds and a speed of 186.683 mph (300.437 km/h).

Pos	No.	Driver	Team	Manufacturer	Time	Speed
1	10	Aric Almirola	Stewart–Haas Racing	Ford	28.926	186.683
2	20	Erik Jones	Joe Gibbs Racing	Toyota	28.939	186.599
3	78	Martin Truex Jr.	Furniture Row Racing	Toyota	28.977	186.355
Official second practice results

=== Final practice ===
Kurt Busch was the fastest in the final practice session with a time of 28.997 seconds and a speed of 186.226 mph (299.702 km/h).

Pos	No.	Driver	Team	Manufacturer	Time	Speed
1	41	Kurt Busch	Stewart–Haas Racing	Ford	28.997	186.226
2	20	Erik Jones	Joe Gibbs Racing	Toyota	29.016	186.104
3	10	Aric Almirola	Stewart–Haas Racing	Ford	29.057	185.842
Official final practice results

== Race ==
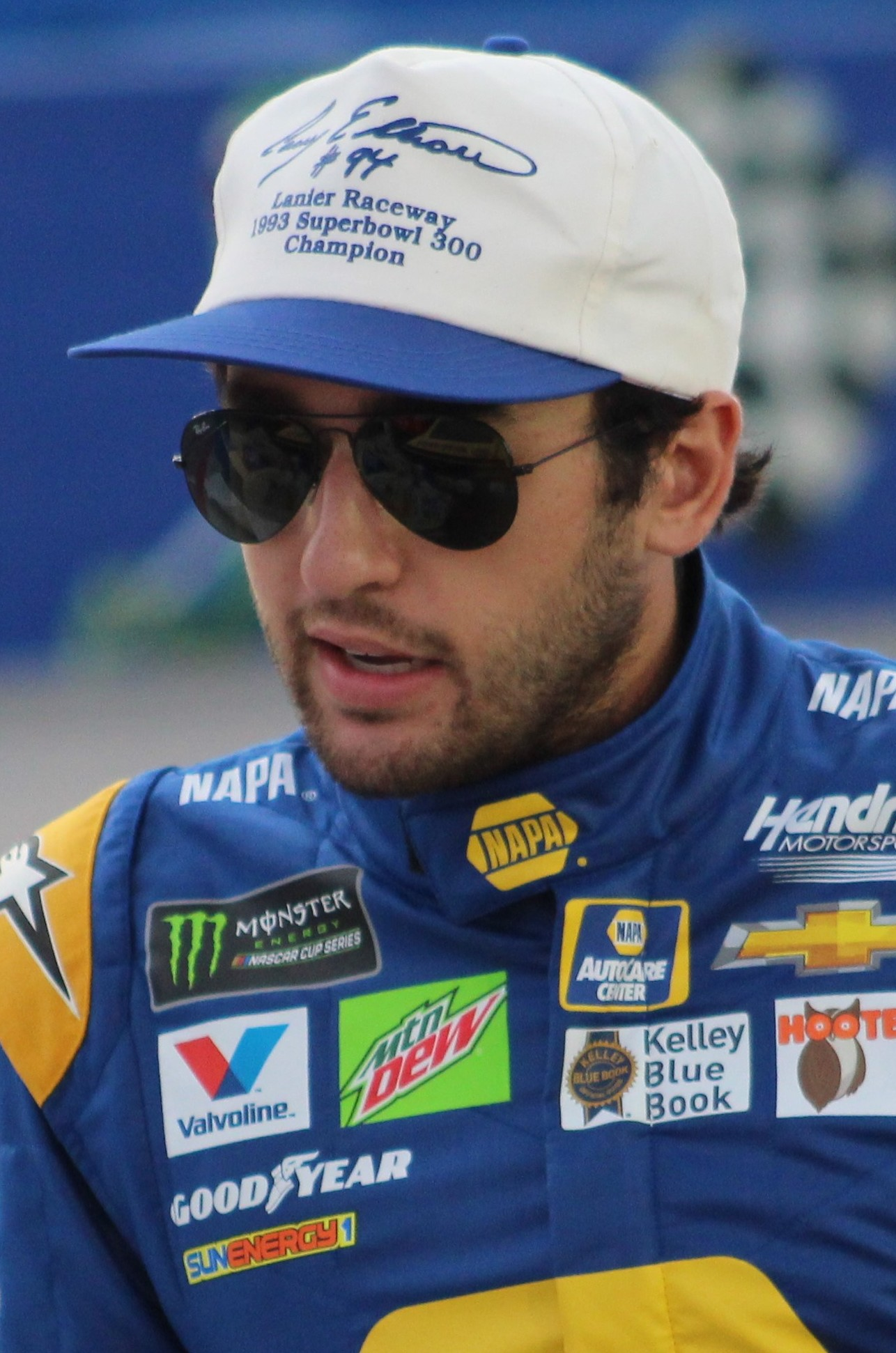
Chase Elliott won the race.

=== Stage Results ===
Stage 1 Laps: 80

Pos	No	Driver	Team	Manufacturer	Points
1	22	Joey Logano	Team Penske	Ford	10
2	4	Kevin Harvick	Stewart–Haas Racing	Ford	9
3	12	Ryan Blaney	Team Penske	Ford	8
4	18	Kyle Busch	Joe Gibbs Racing	Toyota	7
5	21	Paul Menard	Wood Brothers Racing	Ford	6
6	10	Aric Almirola	Stewart–Haas Racing	Ford	5
7	14	Clint Bowyer	Stewart–Haas Racing	Ford	4
8	20	Erik Jones	Joe Gibbs Racing	Toyota	3
9	48	Jimmie Johnson	Hendrick Motorsports	Chevrolet	2
10	9	Chase Elliott	Hendrick Motorsports	Chevrolet	1
Official stage one results

Stage 2 Laps: 80

Pos	No	Driver	Team	Manufacturer	Points
1	4	Kevin Harvick	Stewart–Haas Racing	Ford	10
2	12	Ryan Blaney	Team Penske	Ford	9
3	22	Joey Logano	Team Penske	Ford	8
4	9	Chase Elliott	Hendrick Motorsports	Chevrolet	7
5	18	Kyle Busch	Joe Gibbs Racing	Toyota	6
6	42	Kyle Larson	Chip Ganassi Racing	Chevrolet	5
7	20	Erik Jones	Joe Gibbs Racing	Toyota	4
8	48	Jimmie Johnson	Hendrick Motorsports	Chevrolet	3
9	88	Alex Bowman	Hendrick Motorsports	Chevrolet	2
10	78	Martin Truex Jr.	Furniture Row Racing	Toyota	1
Official stage two results

=== Final Stage Results ===
Stage 3 Laps: 107

Pos	Grid	No	Driver	Team	Manufacturer	Laps	Points
1	13	9	Chase Elliott	Hendrick Motorsports	Chevrolet	267	48
2	7	18	Kyle Busch	Joe Gibbs Racing	Toyota	267	48
3	27	42	Kyle Larson	Chip Ganassi Racing	Chevrolet	267	39
4	6	20	Erik Jones	Joe Gibbs Racing	Toyota	267	40
5	12	78	Martin Truex Jr.	Furniture Row Racing	Toyota	267	33
6	5	2	Brad Keselowski	Team Penske	Ford	267	31
7	4	12	Ryan Blaney	Team Penske	Ford	267	47
8	1	22	Joey Logano	Team Penske	Ford	267	47
9	10	88	Alex Bowman	Hendrick Motorsports	Chevrolet	267	30
10	3	10	Aric Almirola	Stewart–Haas Racing	Ford	267	32
11	23	3	Austin Dillon	Richard Childress Racing	Chevrolet	267	26
12	2	4	Kevin Harvick	Stewart–Haas Racing	Ford	267	44
13	14	14	Clint Bowyer	Stewart–Haas Racing	Ford	267	28
14	9	11	Denny Hamlin	Joe Gibbs Racing	Toyota	266	23
15	16	31	Ryan Newman	Richard Childress Racing	Chevrolet	266	22
16	21	37	Chris Buescher	JTG Daugherty Racing	Chevrolet	266	21
17	20	1	Jamie McMurray	Chip Ganassi Racing	Chevrolet	266	20
18	11	41	Kurt Busch	Stewart–Haas Racing	Ford	266	19
19	28	38	David Ragan	Front Row Motorsports	Ford	265	18
20	15	17	Ricky Stenhouse Jr.	Roush–Fenway Racing	Ford	265	17
21	25	47	A. J. Allmendinger	JTG Daugherty Racing	Chevrolet	265	16
22	22	48	Jimmie Johnson	Hendrick Motorsports	Chevrolet	264	20
23	31	32	Matt DiBenedetto	Go Fas Racing	Ford	264	14
24	8	19	Daniel Suárez	Joe Gibbs Racing	Toyota	263	13
25	30	13	Ty Dillon	Germain Racing	Chevrolet	263	12
26	29	43	Bubba Wallace (R)	Richard Petty Motorsports	Chevrolet	263	11
27	24	34	Michael McDowell	Front Row Motorsports	Ford	262	10
28	26	95	Regan Smith	Leavine Family Racing	Chevrolet	259	9
29	35	00	Landon Cassill (i)	StarCom Racing	Chevrolet	258	0
30	19	6	Trevor Bayne	Roush–Fenway Racing	Ford	258	7
31	36	23	J. J. Yeley (i)	BK Racing	Toyota	256	0
32	18	21	Paul Menard	Wood Brothers Racing	Ford	256	11
33	38	51	B. J. McLeod (i)	Rick Ware Racing	Chevrolet	250	0
34	34	72	Corey LaJoie	TriStar Motorsports	Chevrolet	219	3
35	37	99	Kyle Weatherman	StarCom Racing	Chevrolet	216	2
36	39	7	Reed Sorenson	Premium Motorsports	Chevrolet	157	1
37	33	96	Jeffrey Earnhardt	Gaunt Brothers Racing	Toyota	151	1
38	17	24	William Byron (R)	Hendrick Motorsports	Chevrolet	55	1
39	32	15	Ross Chastain (i)	Premium Motorsports	Chevrolet	37	0
40	40	66	Timmy Hill (i)	MBM Motorsports	Toyota	3	0
Official race results

=== Race statistics ===
- Lead changes: 8 among different drivers
- Cautions/Laps: 3 for 17
- Red flags: 0
- Time of race: 2 hours, 38 minutes and 2 seconds
- Average speed: 152.713 miles per hour (245.768 km/h)

== Media ==
=== Television ===
NBC Sports covered the race on the television side. Rick Allen, Jeff Burton, Steve Letarte and Dale Earnhardt Jr. had the call in the booth for the race. Dave Burns, Parker Kligerman, Marty Snider and Kelli Stavast reported from pit lane during the race.

NBC
Booth announcers	Pit reporters
Lap-by-lap: Rick Allen; Color-commentator: Jeff Burton; Color-commentator: Steve Letarte; Color-commentator: Dale Earnhardt Jr.	Dave Burns; Parker Kligerman; Marty Snider; Kelli Stavast

=== Radio ===
MRN had the radio call for the race, which was simulcast on SiriusXM NASCAR Radio.

MRN
Booth announcers	Turn announcers	Pit reporters
Lead announcer: Joe Moore; Announcer: Jeff Striegle; Announcer: Rusty Wallace	Turns 1 & 2: Dave Moody; Turns 3 & 4: Mike Bagley	Alex Hayden; Winston Kelley; Steve Post; Kim Coon

== Standings after the race ==
	Pos	Driver	Points
1	1	Kyle Busch	4,055
1	2	Kevin Harvick	4,054 (–1)
4	3	Martin Truex Jr.	4,038 (–17)
4	4	Chase Elliott	4,018 (–37)
1	5	Clint Bowyer	4,015 (–40)
3	6	Joey Logano	4,015 (–40)
3	7	Kurt Busch	4,015 (–40)
3	8	Aric Almirola	4,006 (–49)
1	9	Ryan Blaney	2,212 (–1,843)
1	10	Brad Keselowski	2,194 (–1,861)
	11	Kyle Larson	2,178 (–1,877)
1	12	Denny Hamlin	2,159 (–1,896)
2	13	Austin Dillon	2,150 (–1,905)
2	14	Erik Jones	2,148 (–1,907)
1	15	Jimmie Johnson	2,148 (–1,907)
4	16	Alex Bowman	2,144 (–1,911)
Official driver's standings

Manufacturers' Championship standings

Pos	Manufacturer	Points
1	Ford	1,155
2	Toyota	1,143 (–12)
3	Chevrolet	1,061 (–94)
Official manufacturers' standings

- Note: Only the first 16 positions are included for the driver standings.

Previous race: 2018 1000Bulbs.com 500	Monster Energy NASCAR Cup Series; 2018 season	Next race: 2018 First Data 500
