= Claire Decker =

American racing driver (born 1995)

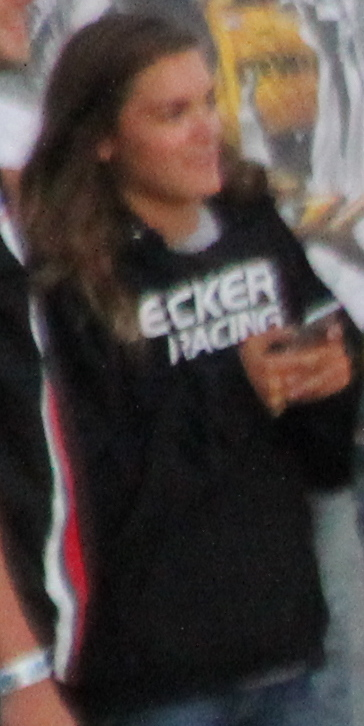
- Decker in 2015
- Born: February 22, 1995 (age 31); Eagle River, Wisconsin, U.S.
- Awards: 2014 NASCAR Drive for Diversity participant

NASCAR O'Reilly Auto Parts Series career
- Best finish: 126th (2016)

NASCAR FedEx Freight Truck Series career
- 2 races run over 1 year
- 2016 position: 105th
- Best finish: 105th (2016)
- First race: 2016 Alpha Energy Solutions 250 (Martinsville)
- Last race: 2016 Speediatrics 200 (Iowa)
Wins	Top tens	Poles
0	0	0
- Statistics up to date as of April 18, 2016.

Claire Decker (born February 22, 1995) is an American professional stock car racing driver. Decker was a 2014 participant in the NASCAR Drive for Diversity.

== Racing career ==
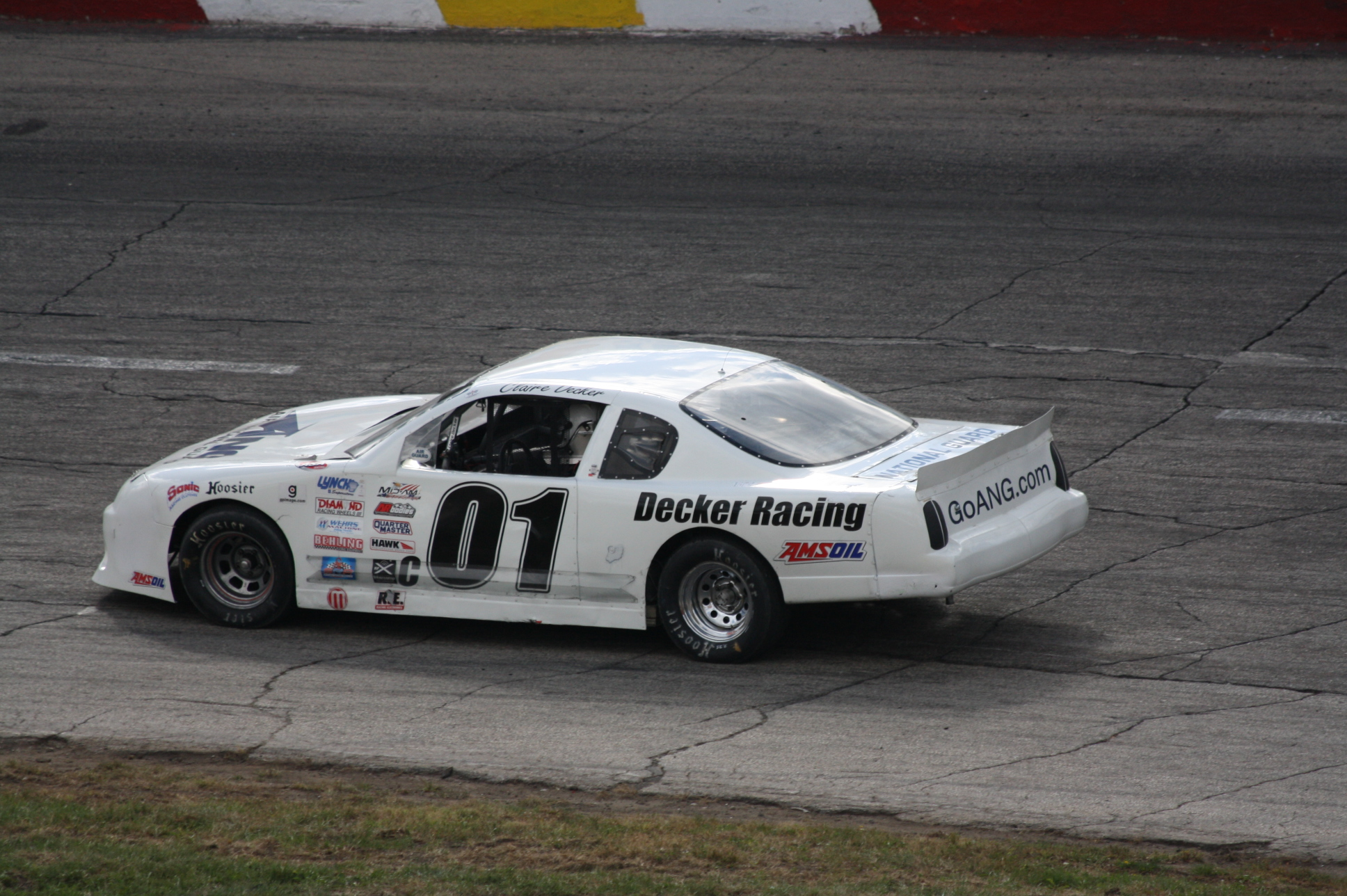
2010 Mid-American car at Rockford

Decker raced in northern Wisconsin. She moved from Super Stock cars to Super Late models. Decker raced Super Late models in the TUNDRA touring series of Wisconsin in 2013. She has won the 2014 Dick Trickle 99 (+ 1) super late model race at Marshfield Motor Speedway.

=== NASCAR ===
Decker attempted to qualify for her first NASCAR race with her sister Paige Decker and her cousin Natalie Decker in the Martinsville race. Claire and Paige qualified for the race, becoming the second set of sisters to race against each other after Amber Cope and Angela Cope. Natalie's time was not fast enough to make the race. Decker started 31st and finished 27th.

== Personal life ==
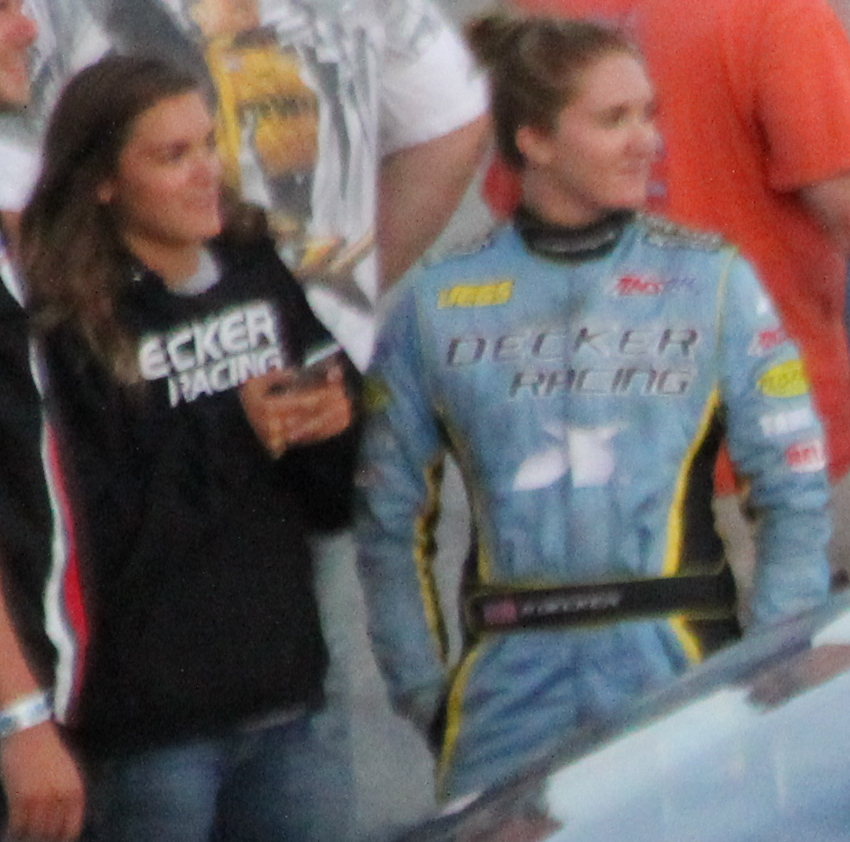
Decker with her sister Paige

Decker is the daughter of Allen Decker who comes from a family of snowmobile racing riders. Four Decker brothers raced snowmobiles in the 1970s; Allen Decker was a factory rider for Bombardier along with teammate Jacques Villeneuve for the 1979-80 season. The Decker family raced snowmobiles against the Danica Patrick family during the 1970s. Sue Decker, Claire's aunt, introduced Danica Patrick's parents.

Decker's sister Paige also races for her family's Decker Racing team. They are joined on the team by their younger cousin NASCAR Drive for Diversity driver Natalie Decker. Natalie's father (and Claire's uncle) is Chuck Decker, the former owner of the Eagle River Derby Track which hosts the World Championship Snowmobile Derby.

== Images ==
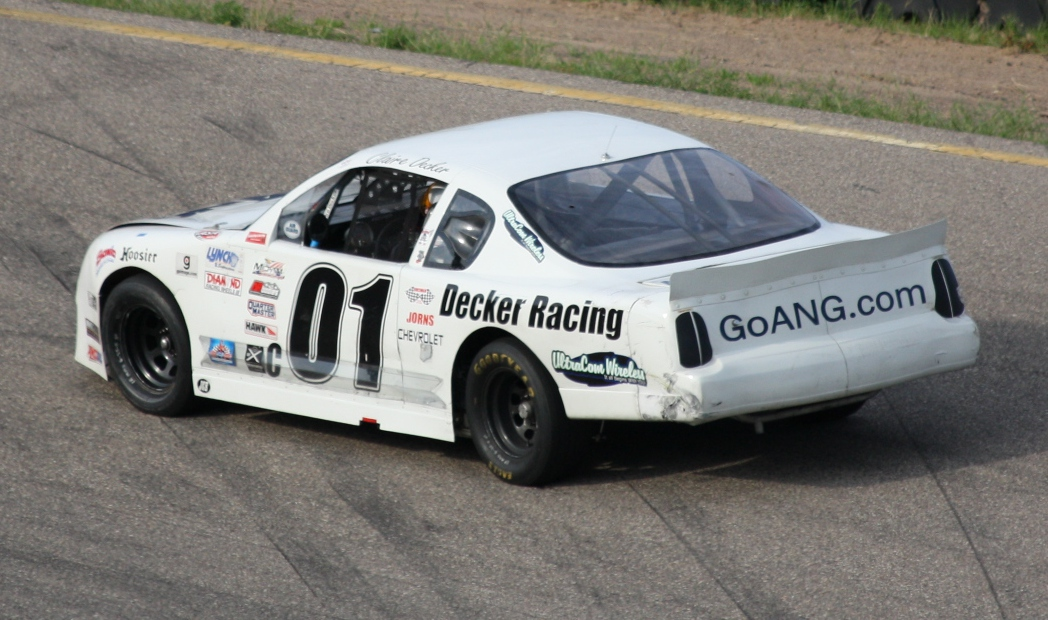
2011 Super Stock at Golden Sands Speedway

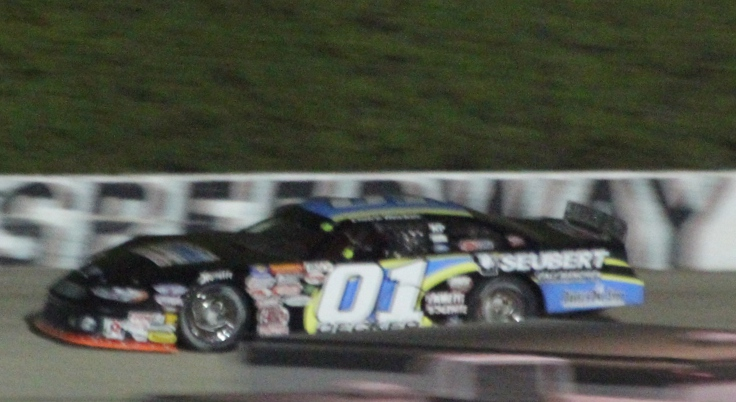
2013 late model at the Oktoberfest weekend at LaCrosse Fairgrounds Speedway

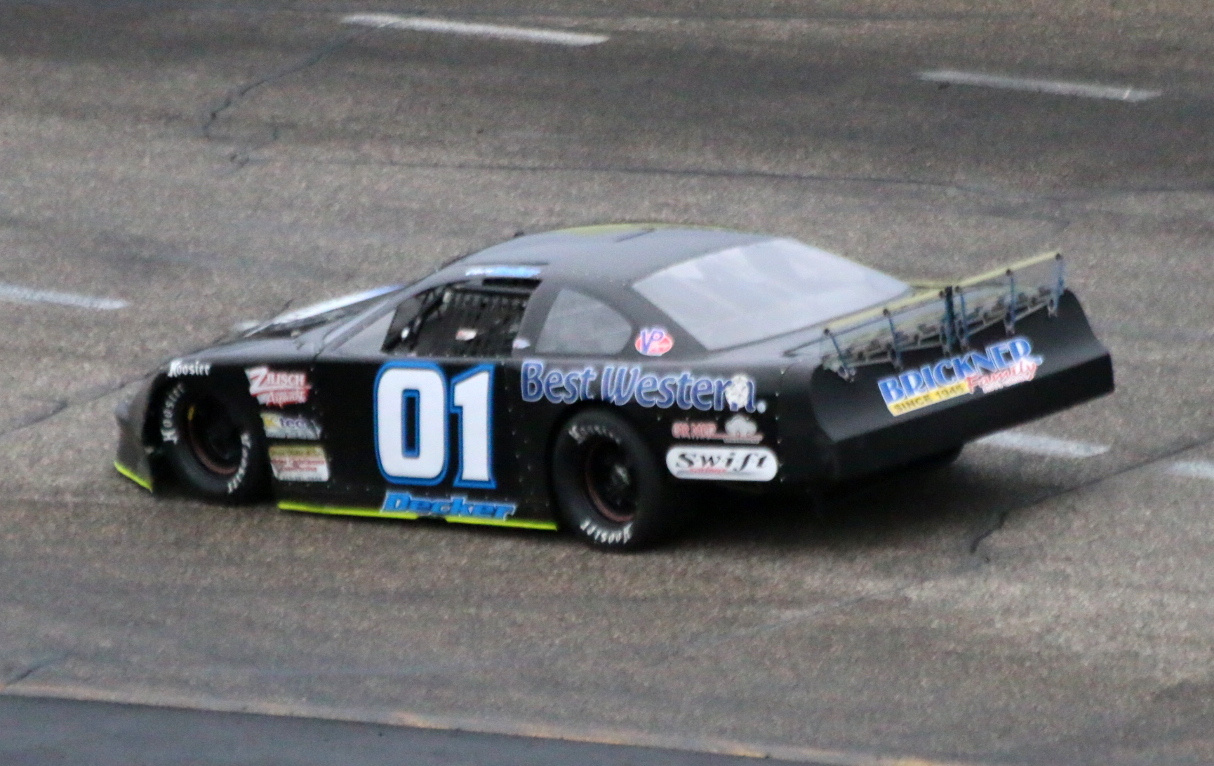
2017 Super Late Model at Dells Raceway Park

== Motorsports career results ==
=== NASCAR ===
(key) (Bold – Pole position awarded by qualifying time. Italics – Pole position earned by points standings or practice time. * – Most laps led.)

==== Xfinity Series ====
NASCAR Xfinity Series results
Year	Team	No.	Make	1	2	3	4	5	6	7	8	9	10	11	12	13	14	15	16	17	18	19	20	21	22	23	24	25	26	27	28	29	30	31	32	33	NXSC	Pts	Ref
2016	Obaika Racing	77	Chevy	DAY	ATL	LVS	PHO	CAL	TEX	BRI	RCH	TAL	DOV	CLT	POC	MCH	IOW; DNQ	DAY	KEN	NHA	IND	IOW	GLN	MOH	BRI	ROA	DAR	RCH	CHI	KEN	DOV	CLT	KAN	TEX	PHO	HOM	126th	-	

==== Camping World Truck Series ====
NASCAR Camping World Truck Series results
Year	Team	No.	Make	1	2	3	4	5	6	7	8	9	10	11	12	13	14	15	16	17	18	19	20	21	22	23	NCWTC	Pts	Ref
2016	JJC Racing	10	Chevy	DAY	ATL	MAR; 27	KAN	DOV	CLT	TEX	IOW; 32	GTW	KEN	ELD	POC	BRI	MCH	MSP	CHI	NHA	LVS	TAL	MAR	TEX	PHO	HOM	105th	0^{1}	

^{*} Season still in progress
^{1} Ineligible for series points
