= Paige Decker =

American racing driver (born 1993)

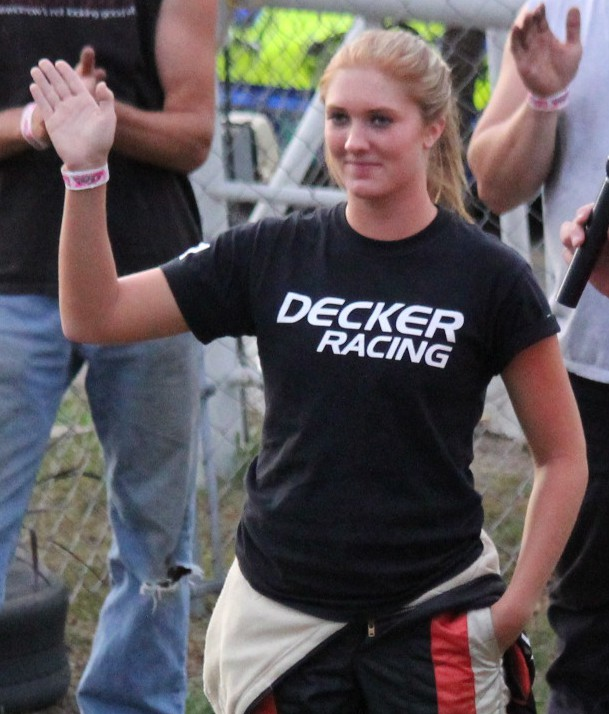
- Decker waves to the crowd in 2013
- Born: March 20, 1993 (age 33); Eagle River, Wisconsin, U.S.
- Awards: 2013 TUNDRA Super Late Model Series Rookie of the Year

NASCAR O'Reilly Auto Parts Series career
- 2 races run over 1 year
- 2016 position: 66th
- Best finish: 66th (2016)
- First race: 2016 American Ethanol E15 250 (Iowa)
- Last race: 2016 Road America 180 (Road America)
Wins	Top tens	Poles
0	0	0

NASCAR FedEx Freight Truck Series career
- 2 races run over 2 years
- 2016 position: 104th
- Best finish: 76th (2015)
- First race: 2015 Kroger 200 (Martinsville)
- Last race: 2016 Alpha Energy Solutions 250 (Martinsville)
Wins	Top tens	Poles
0	0	0
- Statistics up to date as of August 27, 2016.

Paige Decker (born March 20, 1993) is an American professional stock car racing driver from Eagle River, Wisconsin. She has raced in the NASCAR Camping World Truck Series and Xfinity Series and was a 2014 NASCAR Drive for Diversity participant.

== Racing career ==
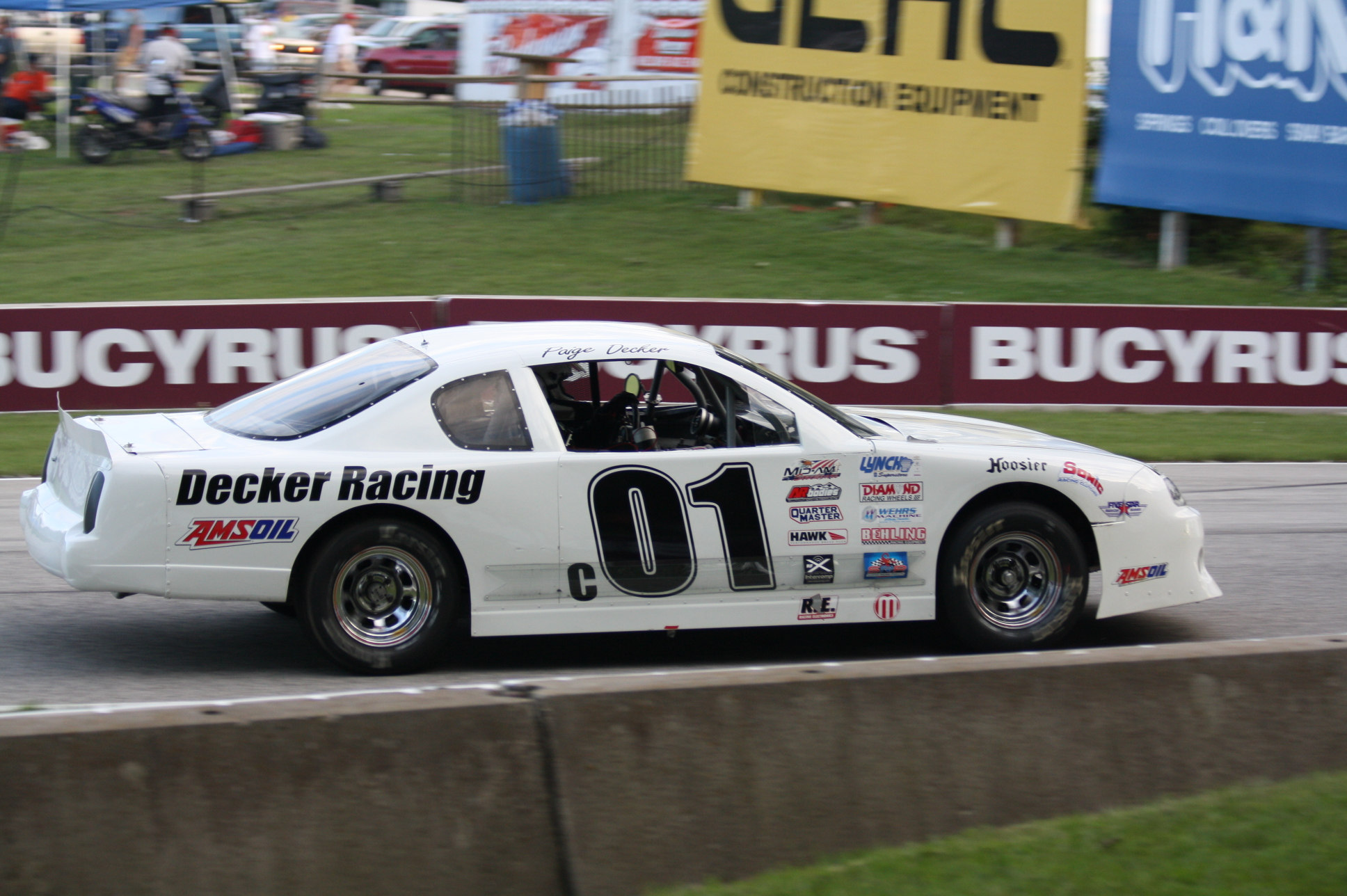
Decker's 2010 Mid-American car at Road America

Decker started her racing career in snowmobiles as a three-year-old. When Natalie was nine years old, Chuck bought her a kart and he bought one for Paige too.

Decker raced in asphalt short tracks in Wisconsin and gradually branched out to other tracks in the Midwestern United States. She toured in the Mid-American Stock Car Series in 2010 and 2011. Then she moved up to racing in Super Late Models. She joined the TUNDRA Super Late Model Tour in 2013. Decker became the first woman and rookie to win in the series at the Golden Sands Speedway event. Decker was awarded the tour's Rookie of the Year in 2013.

=== NASCAR ===
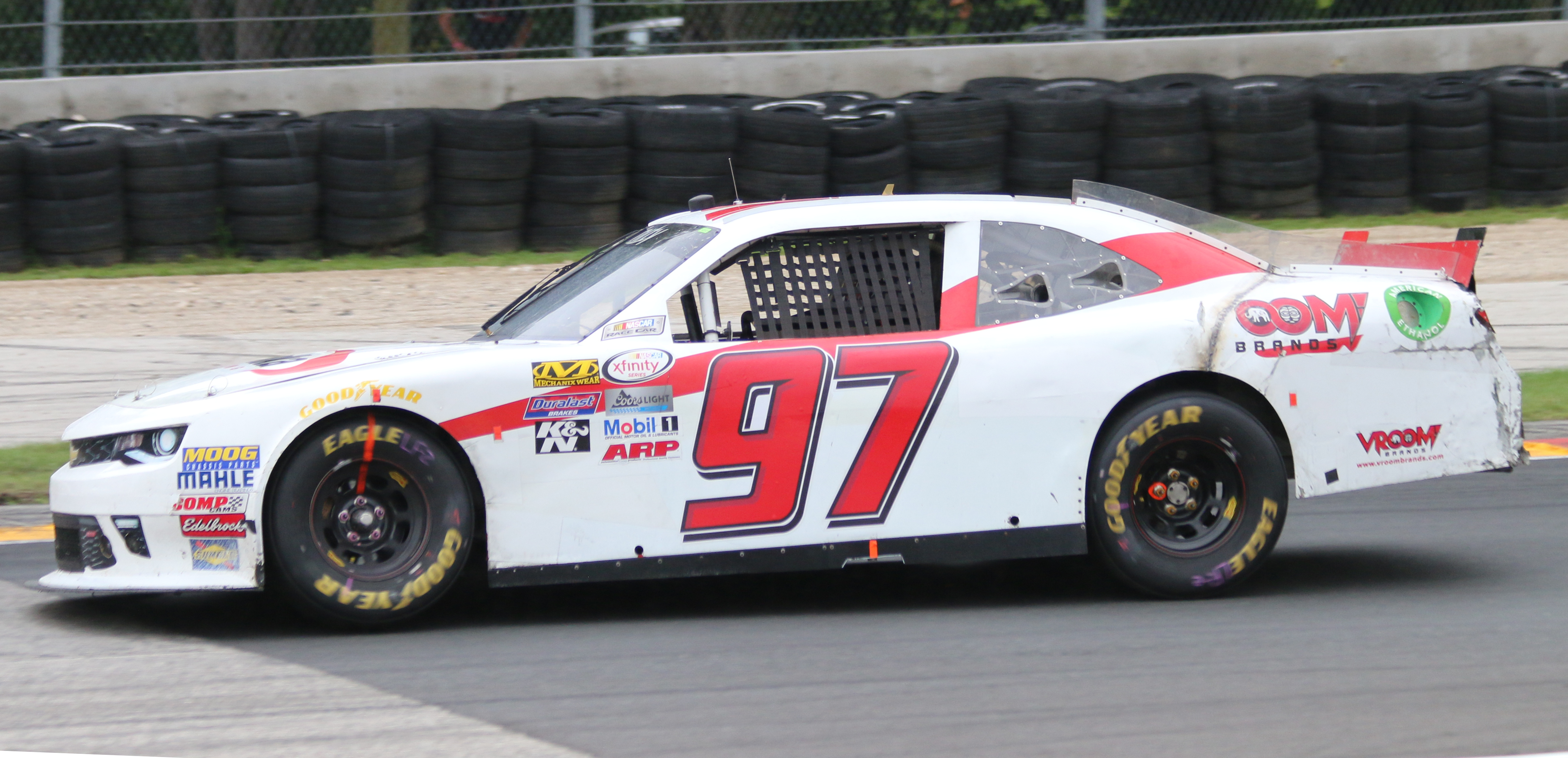
Decker's 2016 Xfinity Series car

Decker was named as a NASCAR Drive for Diversity driver in 2014. She competed in Whelen All-American Series events for Rev Racing that year at the Hickory Motor Speedway, Langley Speedway, and Motor Mile Speedway. She had been attending the University of Wisconsin-Stout (pursuing a degree in early childhood education) for two years but had to quit to race in the Southern United States for the season. She returned to college in 2015 while continuing to race super late models. Decker received a call from Mike Harmon Racing at New Smyrna Speedway during the World Series of Stock Car Racing within the Daytona Speedweeks to see if she was interested to race in one of their trucks. She attempted her first ever NASCAR Camping World Truck Series race driving the No. 74 Chevrolet for owner/driver Mike Harmon, but was one of four teams that failed to qualify. She qualified 33rd fastest, about 1/10 second behind the 32nd final spot. The first practice for the race had rained out and she had one 90 minute practice to find speed. She has NASCAR certification to run short tracks in the Truck Series only; her goal is to race in the Xfinity Series. Decker planned another attempt at Iowa Speedway on June 19, 2015; this deal, however, did not come together. Decker qualified in the fall Martinsville race and finished 30th. Decker returned in 2016, with her sister Claire Decker, and her cousin Natalie Decker competing in the Martinsville race. Claire and Paige qualified for the race, while Natalie was sent home.

== Personal life ==
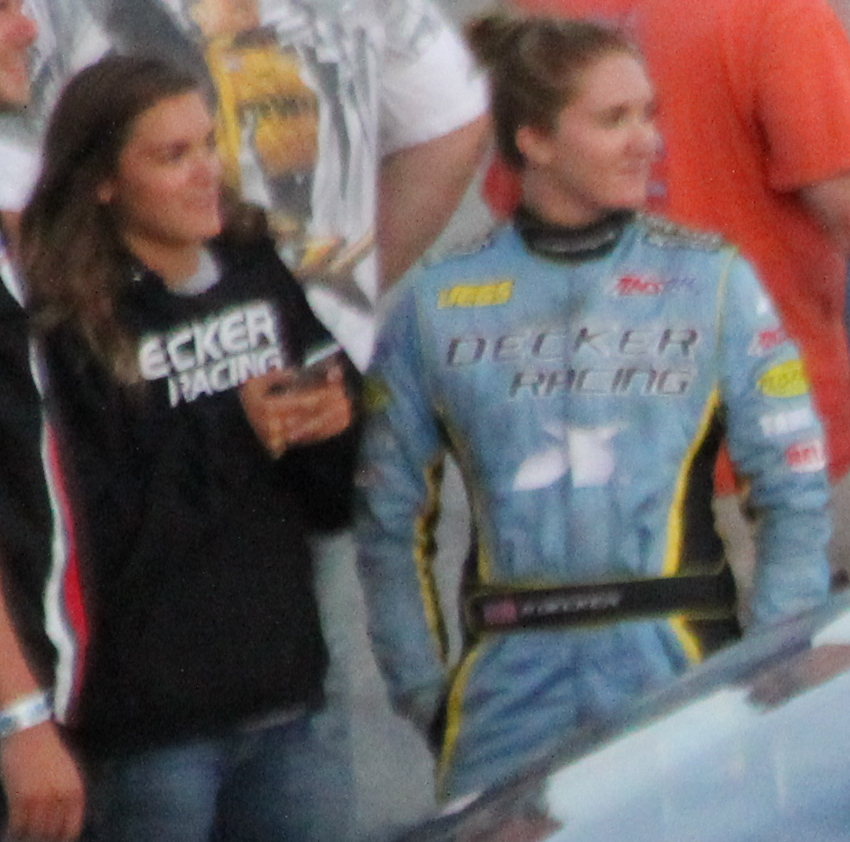
Decker with her sister Claire

Decker is the daughter of Allen Decker who comes from a family of snowmobile racing riders. Four Decker brothers raced snowmobiles in the 1970s; Allen Decker was a factory rider for Bombardier along with teammate Jacques Villeneuve for the 1979–80 season. The Decker family raced snowmobiles against the Danica Patrick family during the 1970s. Sue Decker, Paige's aunt, introduced Danica Patrick's parents.

Decker's sister Claire also races for her family's Decker Racing team. They are joined on the team by their younger cousin NASCAR Drive for Diversity driver Natalie Decker. Natalie's father (and Paige's uncle) is Chuck Decker, the former owner of the Eagle River Derby Track which hosts the World Championship Snowmobile Derby.

Decker was a student at the University of Wisconsin–Stout and graduated in December 2016.

== Images ==
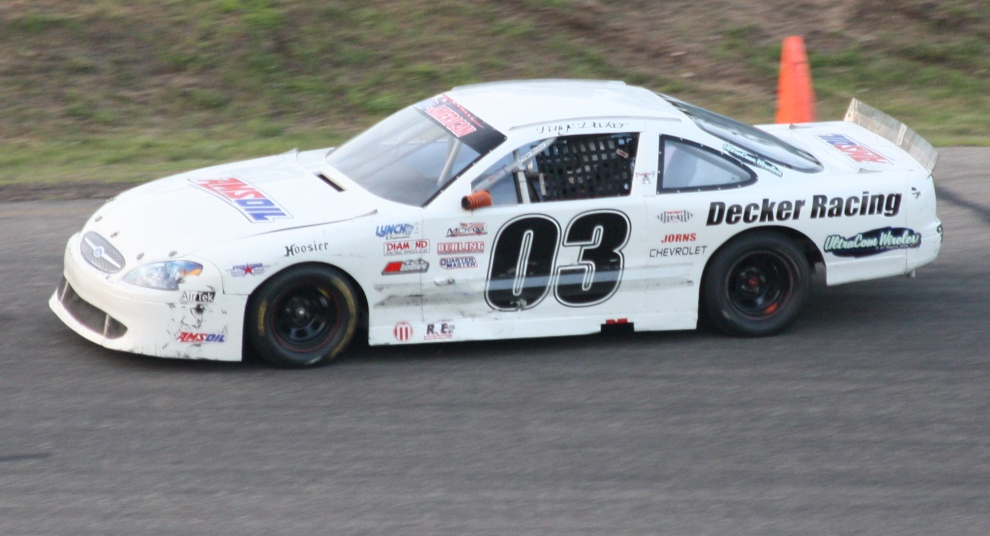
2011 Super Stock at Golden Sands Speedway

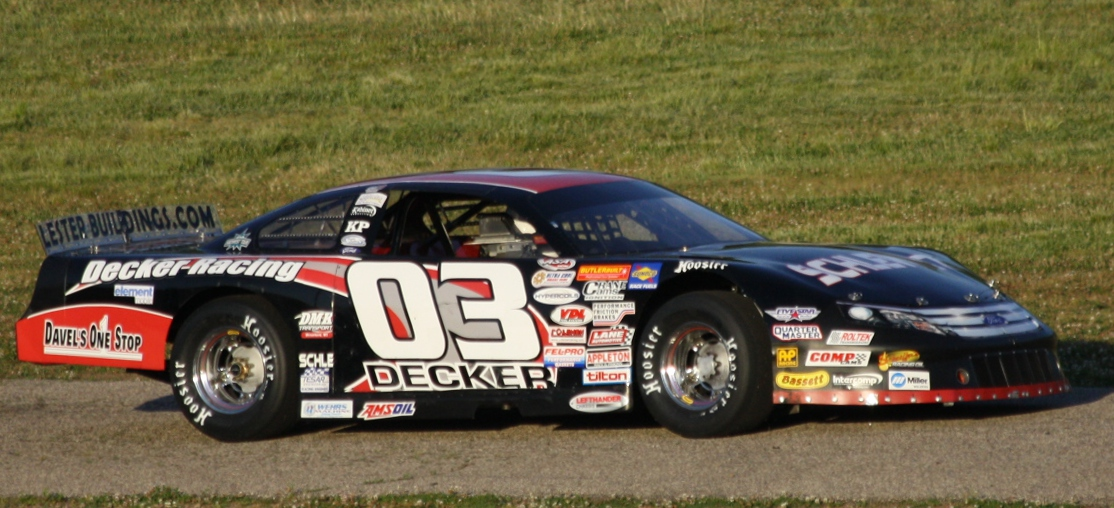
2012 Late Model at Marshfield Motor Speedway

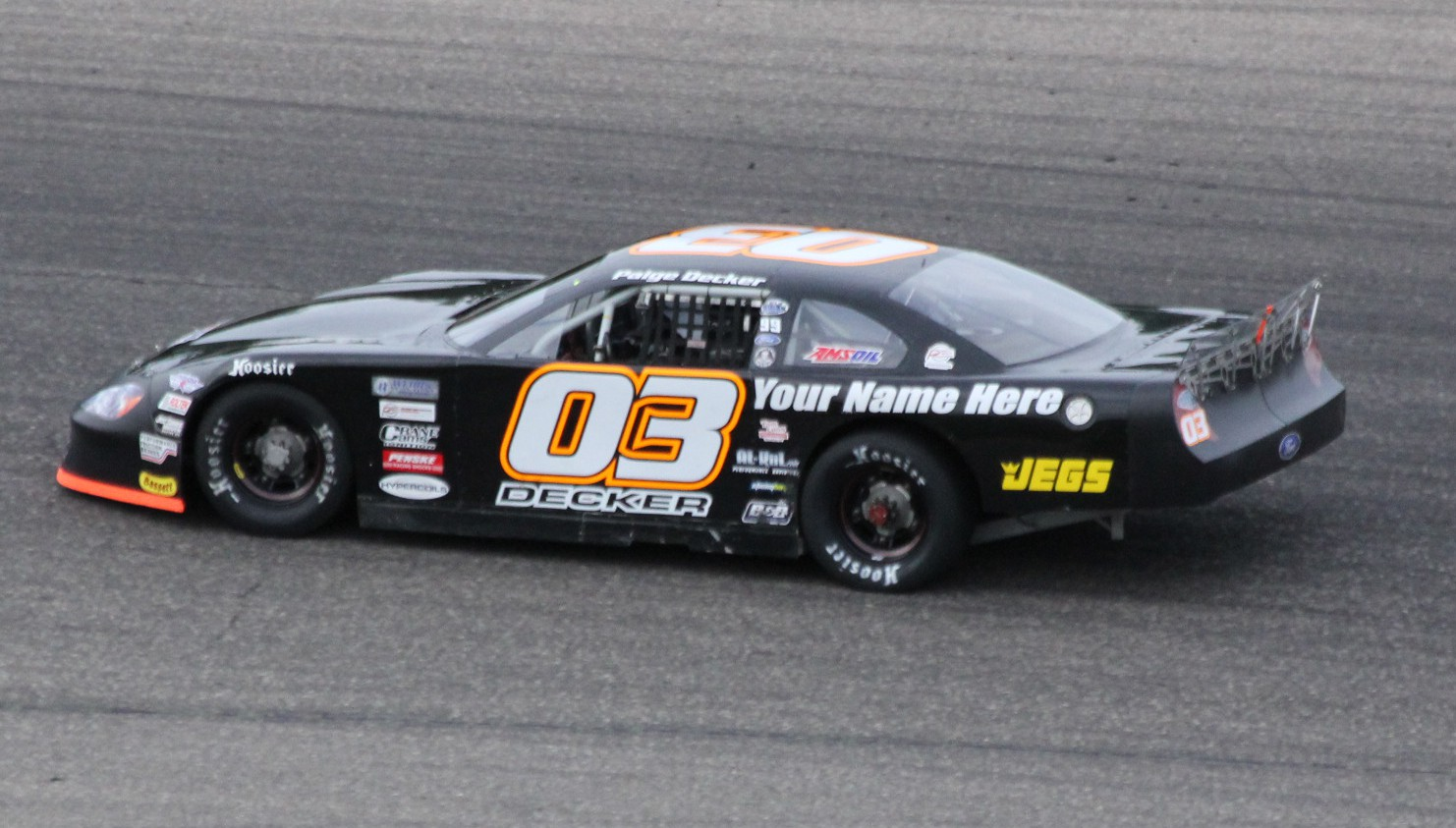
driving her 2013 late model at Golden Sands Speedway

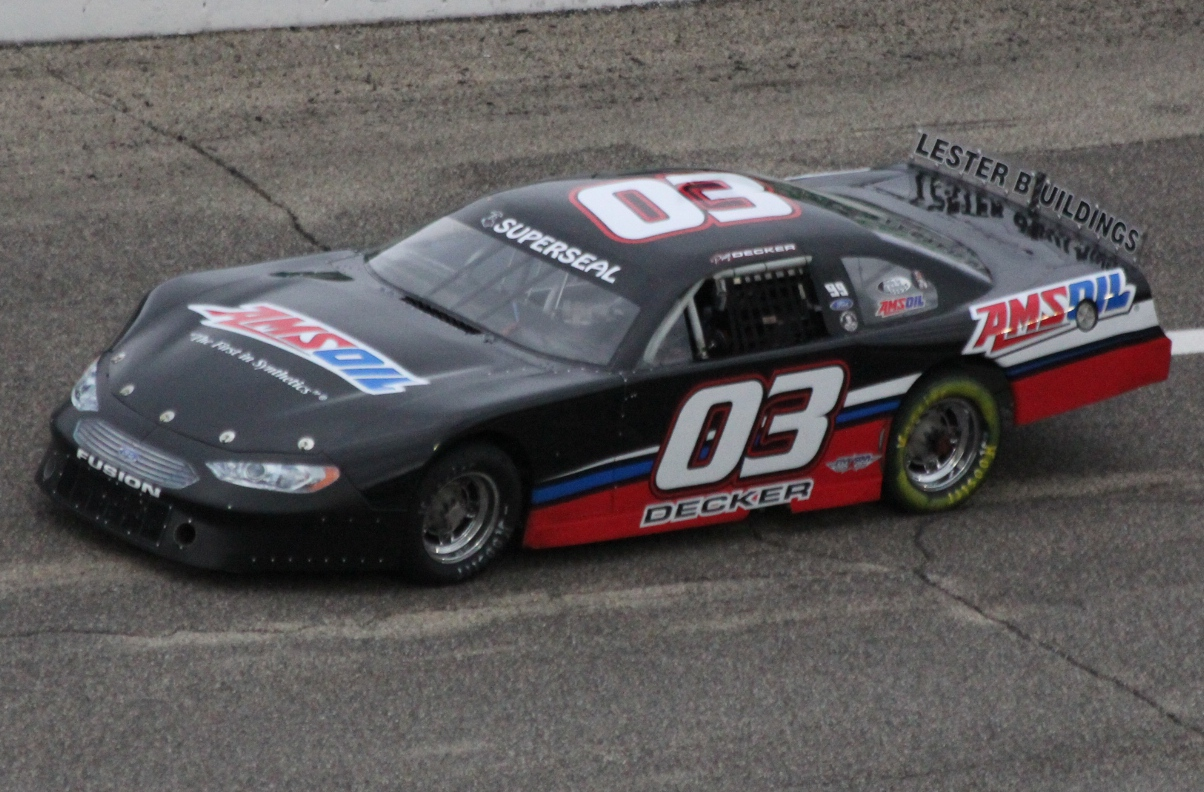
driving her late model at the 2014 Slinger Nationals

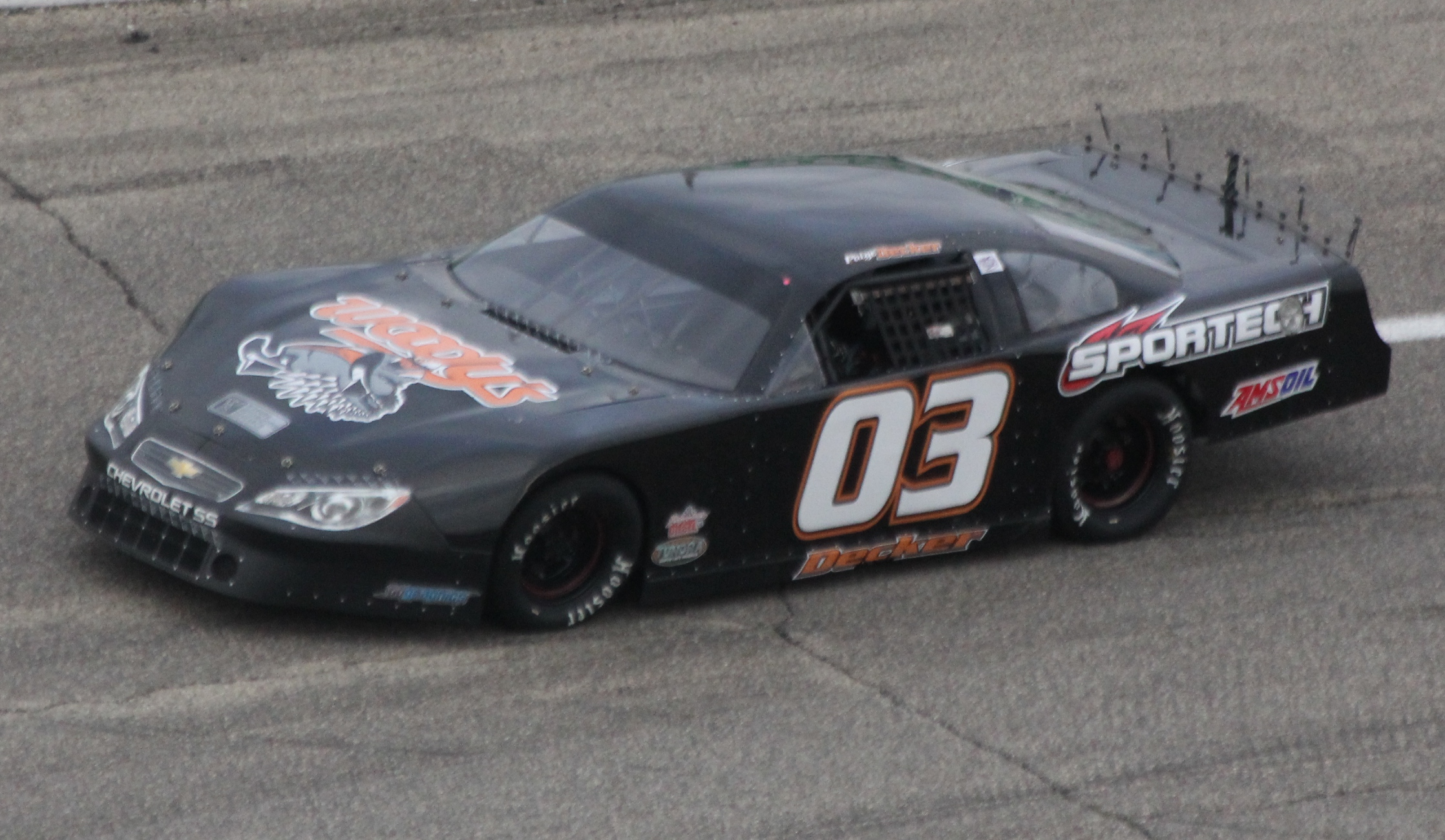
2015 late model at the Slinger Nationals

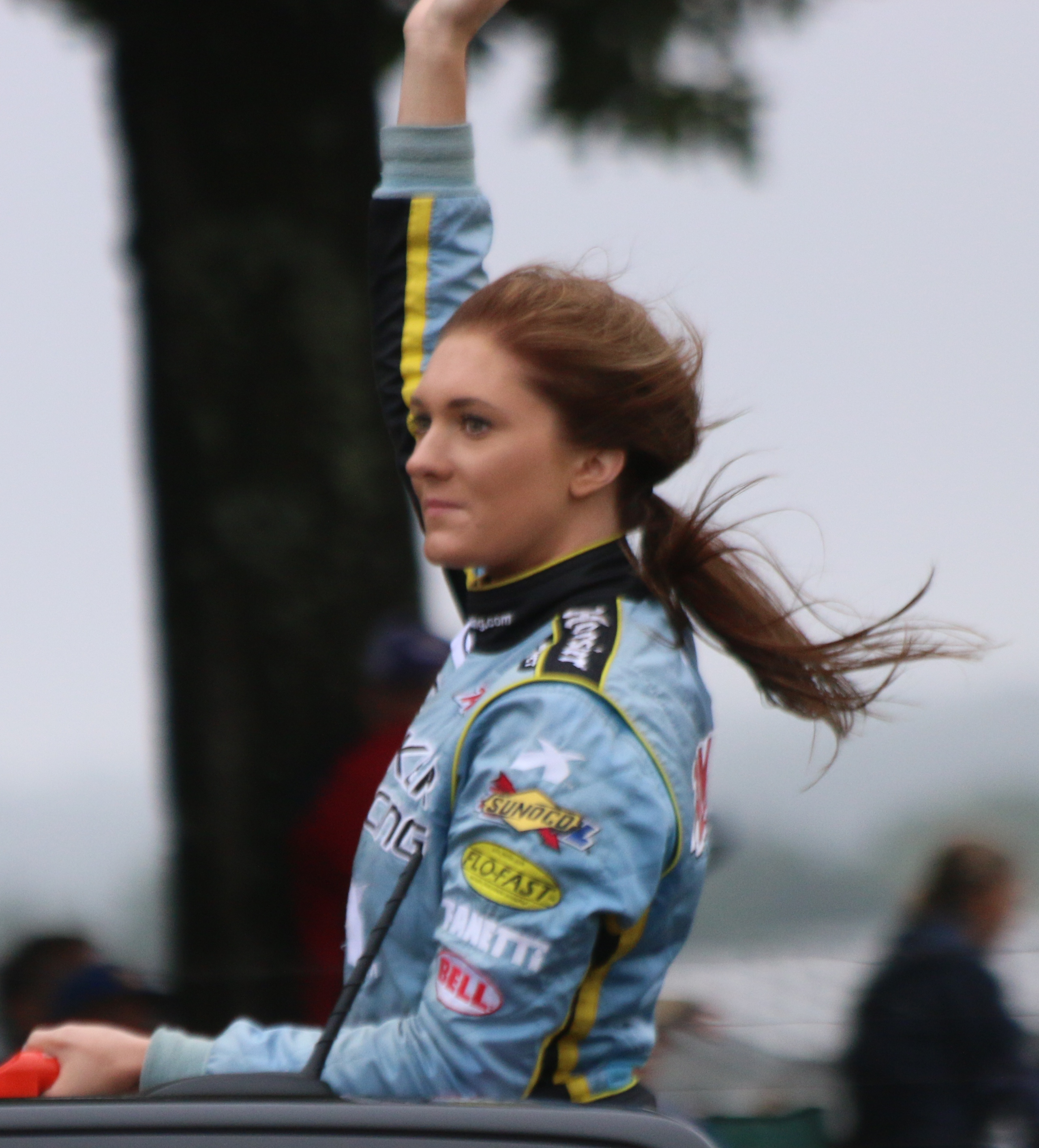
Decker at 2016 Road America 180 Xfinity race

== Motorsports career results ==
=== NASCAR ===
(key) (Bold – Pole position awarded by qualifying time. Italics – Pole position earned by points standings or practice time. * – Most laps led.)

==== Xfinity Series ====
NASCAR Xfinity Series results
Year	Team	No.	Make	1	2	3	4	5	6	7	8	9	10	11	12	13	14	15	16	17	18	19	20	21	22	23	24	25	26	27	28	29	30	31	32	33	NXSC	Pts	Ref
2016	Obaika Racing	97	Chevy	DAY	ATL	LVS	PHO	CAL	TEX	BRI	RCH	TAL	DOV	CLT	POC	MCH	IOW; 31	DAY	KEN	NHA	IND	IOW	GLN	MOH	BRI	ROA; 31	DAR	RCH	CHI	KEN	DOV	CLT	KAN	TEX	PHO	HOM	66th	20	

==== Camping World Truck Series ====
NASCAR Camping World Truck Series results
Year	Team	No.	Make	1	2	3	4	5	6	7	8	9	10	11	12	13	14	15	16	17	18	19	20	21	22	23	NCWTC	Pts	Ref
2015	Mike Harmon Racing	74	Chevy	DAY	ATL	MAR; DNQ	KAN	CLT	DOV	TEX	GTW	IOW	KEN	ELD	POC	MCH	BRI	MSP	CHI	NHA	LVS	TAL					76th	14	
2015	Mike Harmon Racing	74	Ram																				MAR; 30	TEX	PHO	HOM	76th	14	
2016	Mike Harmon Racing	74	Ram	DAY	ATL	MAR; 25	KAN	DOV	CLT	TEX	IOW	GTW	KEN	ELD	POC	BRI	MCH	MSP	CHI	NHA	LVS	TAL	MAR	TEX	PHO	HOM	104th	0^{1}	

^{*} Season still in progress
^{1} Ineligible for series points
