= Matt Waltz =

American racing driver (born 1989)

- Born: Matthew Christopher Waltz; October 6, 1989 (age 37); Newport News, Virginia, U.S.
- Achievements: 2017 Langley Speedway late model track champion

NASCAR O'Reilly Auto Parts Series career
- 7 races run over 2 years
- 2016 position: 51st
- Best finish: 51st (2016)
- First race: 2015 Virginia 529 College Savings 250 (Richmond)
- Last race: 2016 O'Reilly Auto Parts Challenge (Texas)
Wins	Top tens	Poles
0	0	0
- Statistics up to date as of November 5, 2016.

Matthew Christopher Waltz (born October 6, 1989) is an American semi-retired professional stock car racing driver. He competed in the NASCAR Xfinity Series, driving for Derrike Cope Racing and Obaika Racing, and raced late models at Langley Speedway, winning the track championship in 2017.

== Racing career ==
=== Late models ===
Waltz grew up racing Late Model cars on his home track Langley Speedway, which he shared with fellow NASCAR driver Brandon Gdovic. He took second in the Denny Hamlin Short Track Shootout in 2014, the same year he won twelve races at Langley. Returning to Langley in 2017, Waltz claimed his first late model championship at the track.

=== Xfinity Series ===
Waltz began his NASCAR career in a one race deal driving the No. 70 Chevrolet Camaro for Derrike Cope Racing at Richmond International Raceway in fall 2015, Waltz's first race with live pit stops. He started 37th and finished 33rd after retiring with electrical issues and a lap penalty for pitting too early. He attempted another race later in the season with DCR, at Phoenix International Raceway, but failed to qualify. The relationship stemmed from a chance encounter with Cope and his team at the spring Richmond race, which led to Waltz driving the Cope hauler to Iowa Speedway for the race there. In return, Cope gave Waltz the ride at Richmond.

In 2016, Waltz debuted with Obaika Racing at New Hampshire Motor Speedway, qualifying 39th and finishing 28th. Two races later at Iowa Speedway, rear gear problems dropped him to a 35th-place finish. Waltz then ran four races for Obaika in the Xfinity Series Chase, finishing no higher than 34th.

After the 2016 season, Waltz returned to late model racing because of inadequate sponsorship and did not compete in a NASCAR race in 2017.

=== Retirement ===
In early 2018, Waltz announced his retirement from full-time racing due to a number of factors, mainly a lack of opportunities to advance, a want of more free time, and spending more time running his family business. He did, however, come out of retirement to attempt the 2019 ValleyStar Credit Union 300. He has also competed in sporadic CARS Late Model Stock Tour races since 2021.

== Personal life ==
Waltz is an Old Dominion University graduate with a Mechanical Engineering degree, racing while attending classes.

== Motorsports career results ==
=== Stock car career summary ===
Season	Series	Team	Races	Wins	Top 5	Top 10	Points	Position
2015	CARS Late Model Stock Car Tour	Randy Sears	2	0	0	0	25	43rd
2015	NASCAR Xfinity Series	Derrike Cope Racing	1	0	0	0	11	78th
2016	NASCAR Xfinity Series	Obaika Racing	6	0	0	0	41	51st
2021	CARS Late Model Stock Car Tour	Waltz Racing	1	0	0	0	15	54th
2023	CARS Late Model Stock Car Tour	Waltz Racing	1	0	0	0	13	71st
2025	CARS Late Model Stock Car Tour	Waltz Racing	2	0	1	1	61	38th
2026	CARS Late Model Stock Car Tour	Waltz Racing	1	0	0	0	28	63rd

=== NASCAR ===
(key) (Bold – Pole position awarded by qualifying time. Italics – Pole position earned by points standings or practice time. * – Most laps led.)

==== Xfinity Series ====
NASCAR Xfinity Series results
Year	Team	No.	Make	1	2	3	4	5	6	7	8	9	10	11	12	13	14	15	16	17	18	19	20	21	22	23	24	25	26	27	28	29	30	31	32	33	NXSC	Pts	Ref
2015	Derrike Cope Racing	70	Chevy	DAY	ATL	LVS	PHO	CAL	TEX	BRI	RCH	TAL	IOW	CLT	DOV	MCH	CHI	DAY	KEN	NHA	IND	IOW	GLN	MOH	BRI	ROA	DAR	RCH; 33	CHI	KEN	DOV	CLT	KAN	TEX	PHO; DNQ	HOM	78th	11	
2016	Obaika Racing	97	Chevy	DAY	ATL	LVS	PHO	CAL	TEX	BRI	RCH	TAL	DOV	CLT	POC	MCH	IOW	DAY	KEN	NHA; 28	IND	IOW; 35	GLN	MOH	BRI	ROA	DAR	RCH	CHI				KAN; 37				51st	41	
2016	Obaika Racing	77	Chevy																											KEN; 36	DOV; 35	CLT		TEX; 34	PHO	HOM	51st	41	

=== CARS Late Model Stock Car Tour ===
(key) (Bold – Pole position awarded by qualifying time. Italics – Pole position earned by points standings or practice time. * – Most laps led. ** – All laps led.)

CARS Late Model Stock Car Tour results
Year	Team	No.	Make	1	2	3	4	5	6	7	8	9	10	11	12	13	14	15	16	CLMSCTC	Pts	Ref
2015	Randy Sears	34	Ford	SNM; 12	ROU; 29	HCY	SNM	TCM	MMS	ROU	CON	MYB	HCY							43rd	25	
2021	Waltz Racing	2W	Chevy	DIL	HCY	OCS	ACE	CRW	LGY; 18	DOM	HCY	MMS	TCM	FLC	WKS	SBO				54th	15	
2023	Waltz Racing	2M	Chevy	SNM	FLC	HCY	ACE	NWS	LGY; 20	DOM	CRW	HCY	ACE	TCM	WKS	AAS	SBO	TCM	CRW	71st	13	
2025	Waltz Racing	2W	Chevy	AAS	WCS	CDL	OCS	ACE	NWS	**LGY**; 3	DOM	CRW	HCY	AND	FLC; 23	SBO	TCM	NWS		38th	61	
2026	Waltz Racing	2W	Chevy	SNM	WCS	NSV	CRW	ACE	LGY; 14	DOM	NWS	HCY	AND	FLC	TCM	NPS	SBO			63rd	28	

^{*} Season still in progress
^{1} Ineligible for series points
