= 2016 NASCAR Xfinity Series =

American motorsport season

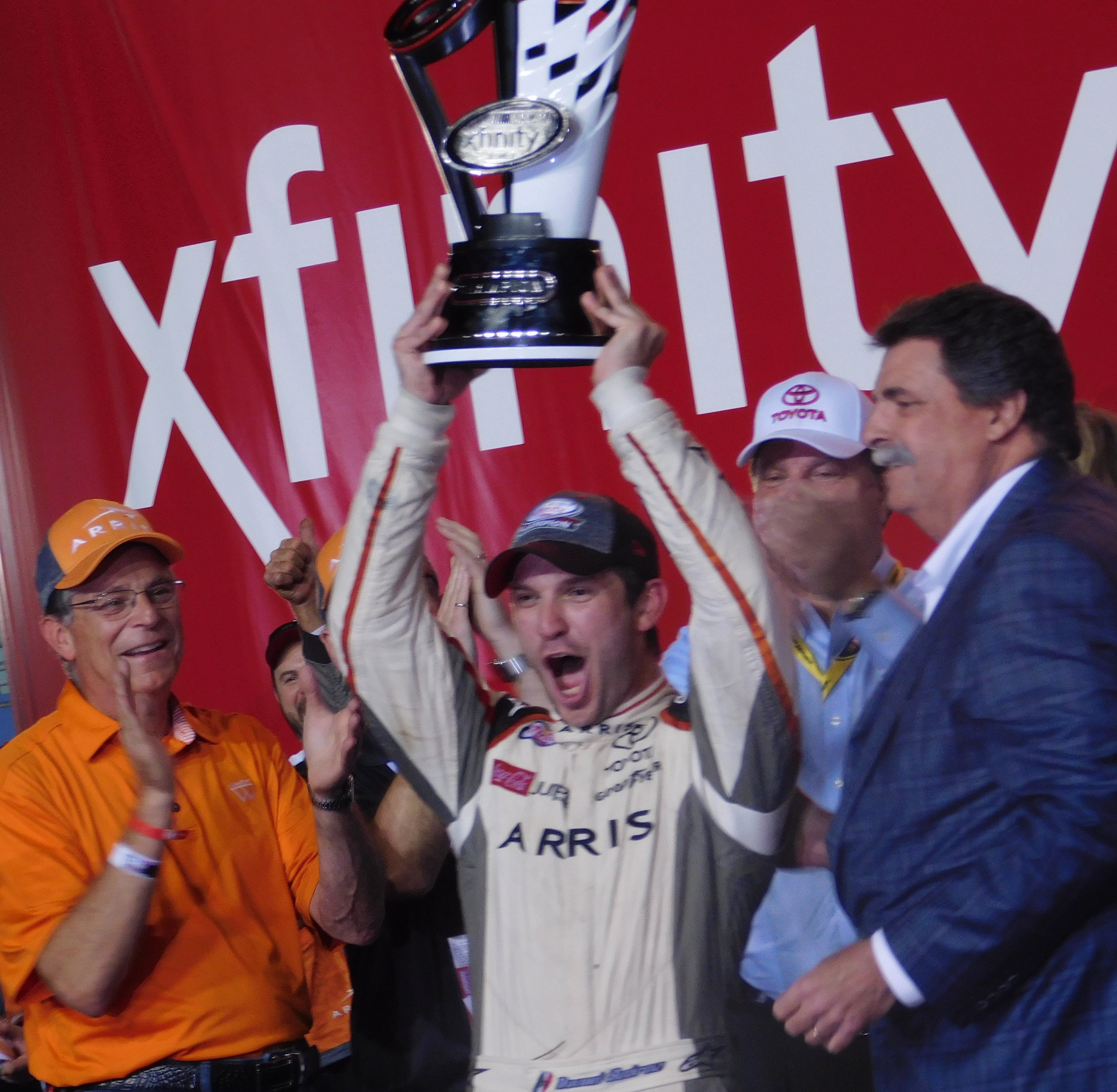
Daniel Suárez, the 2016 Xfinity Series champion.

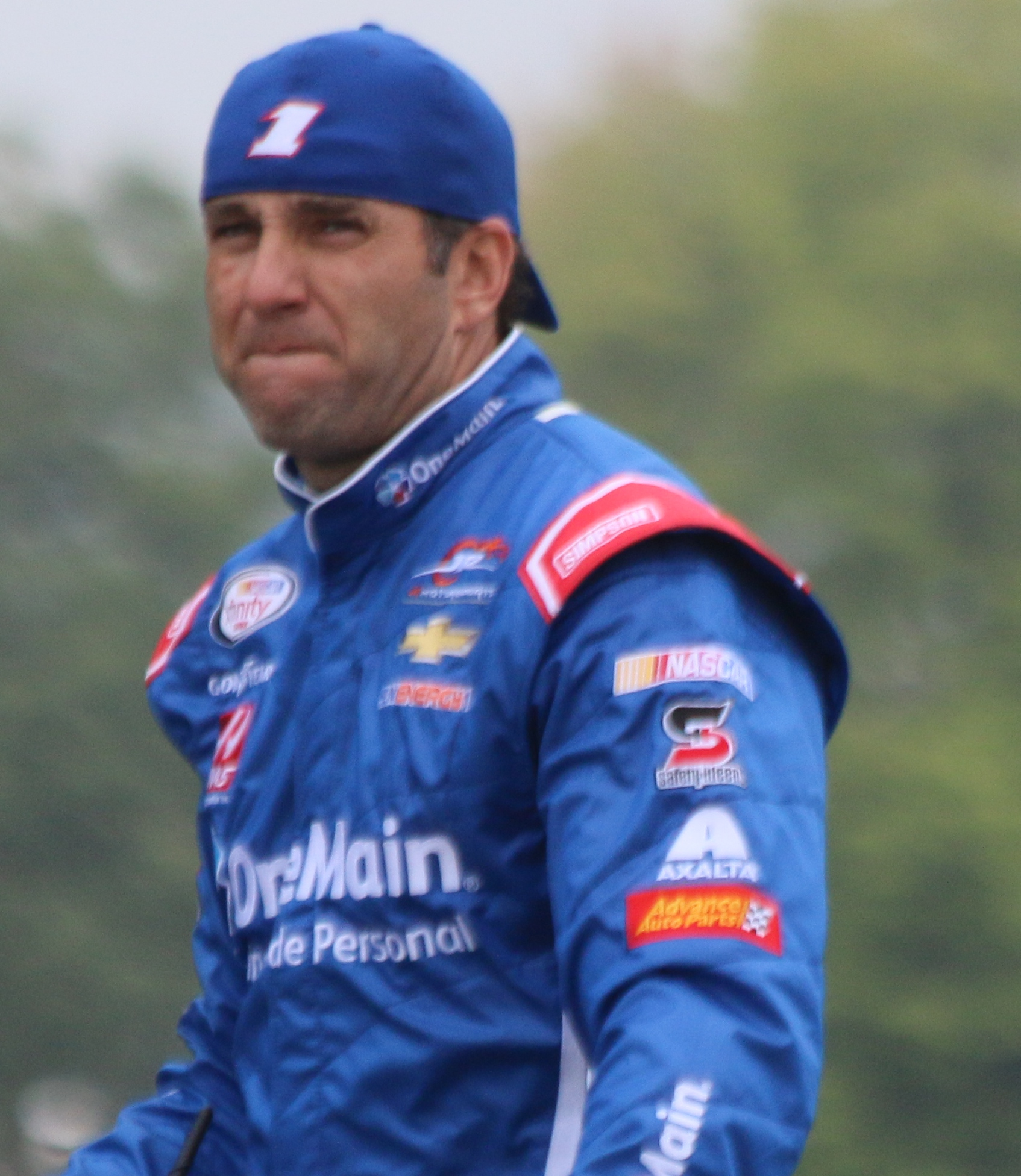
Elliott Sadler finished second behind Suárez in the championship.

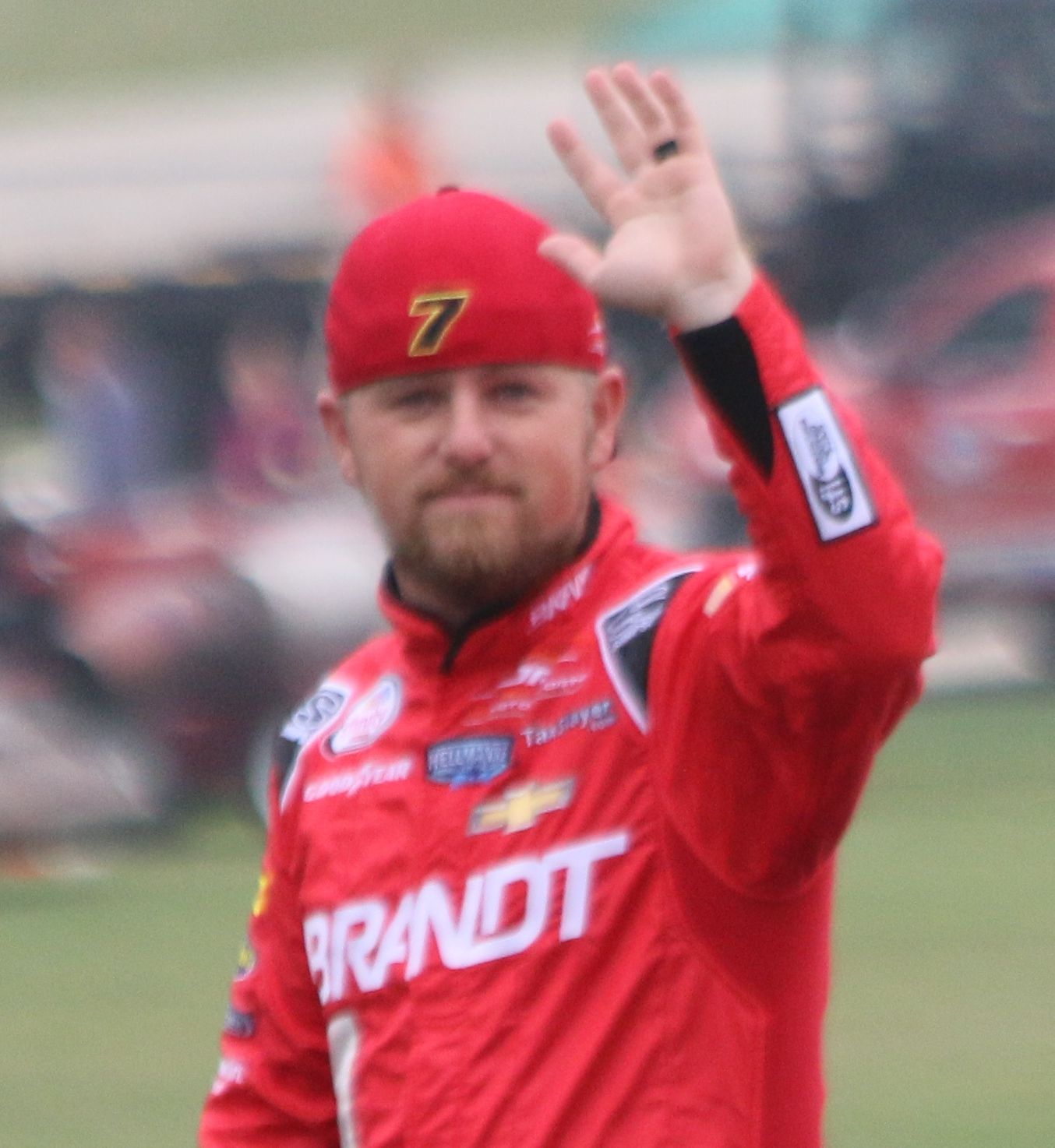
Justin Allgaier finished third in the championship.

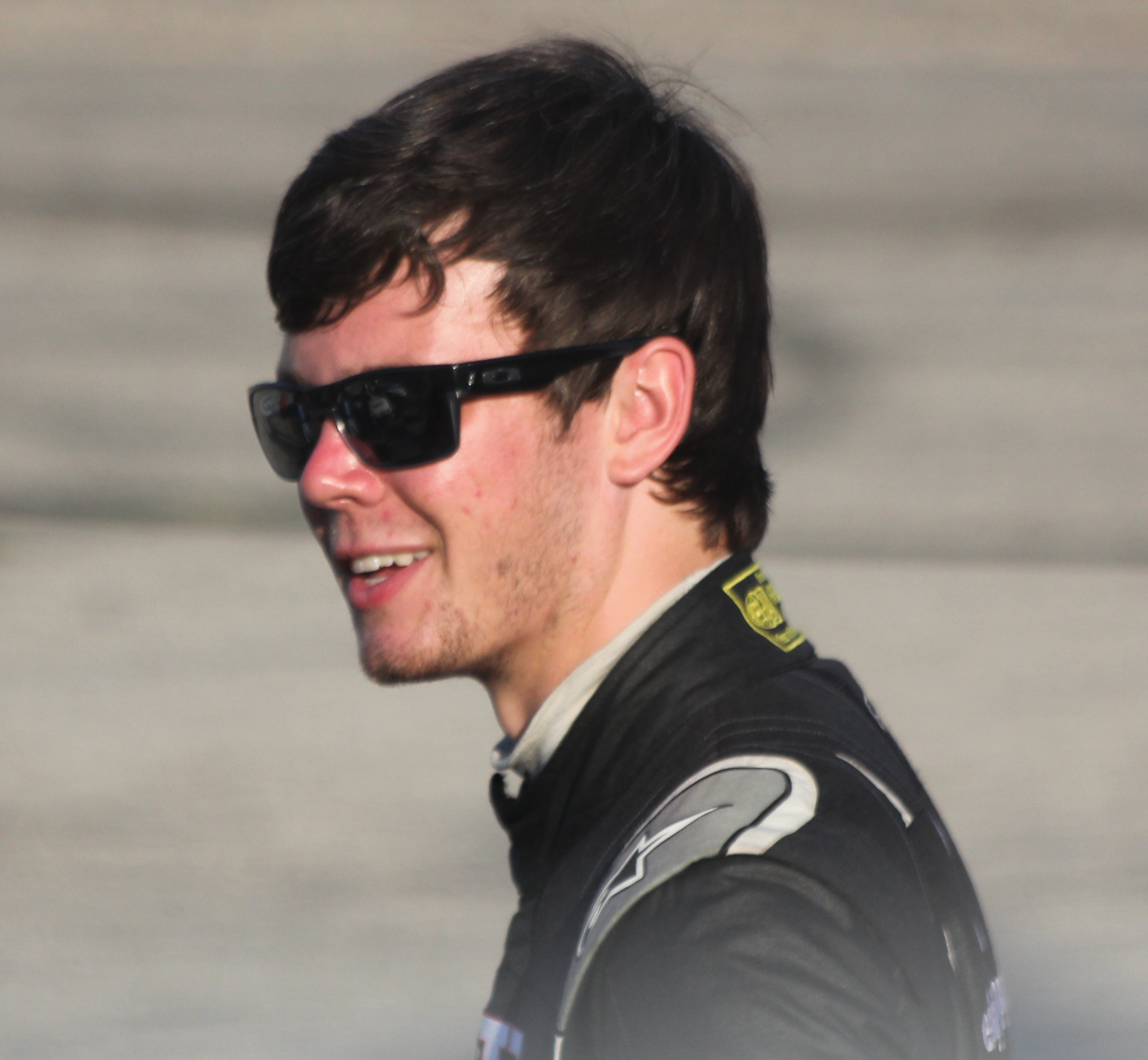
Erik Jones finished fourth in the championship, and was Rookie of the Year.

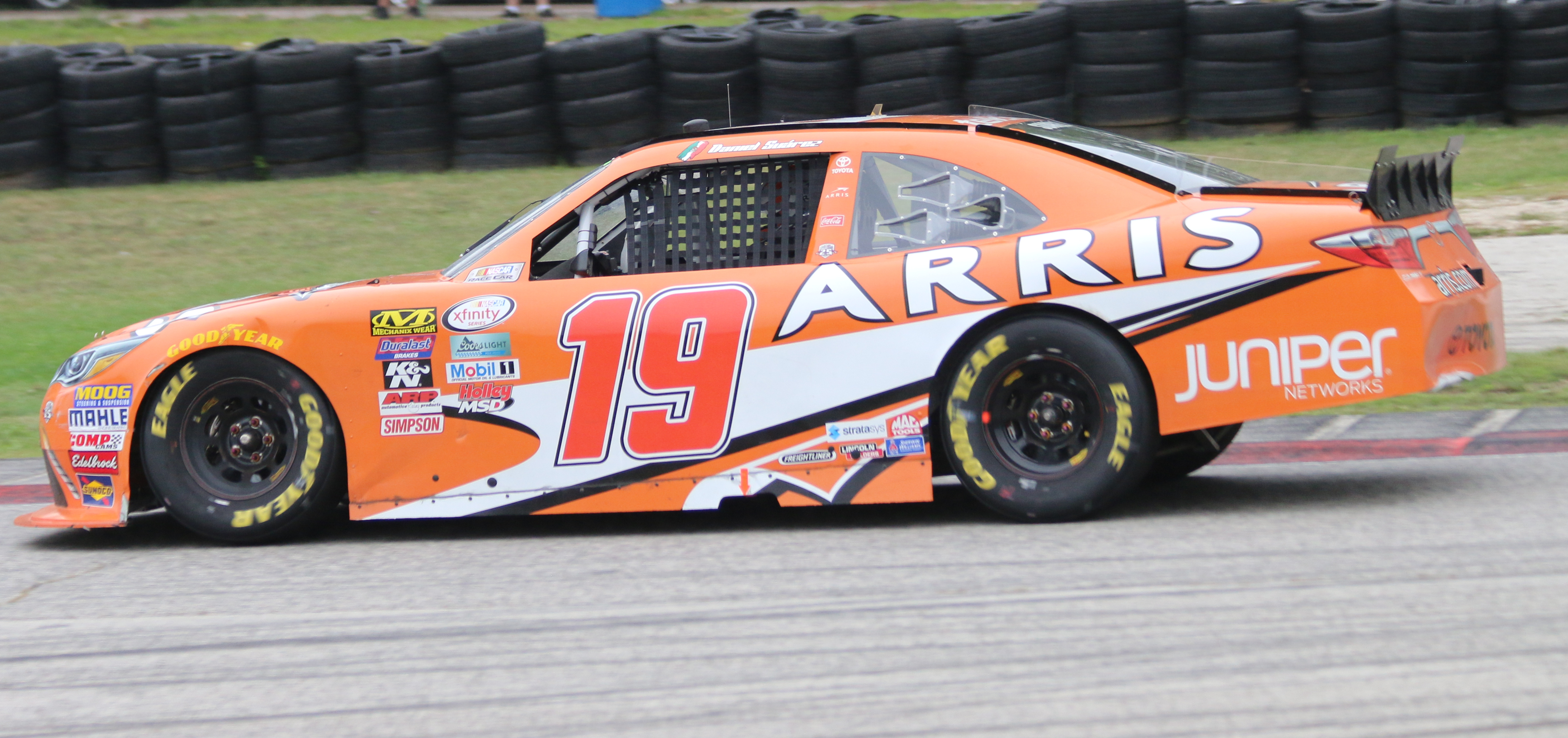
Toyota won the Manufacturers' championship with 19 wins and 1362 points.

The 2016 NASCAR Xfinity Series was the 35th season of the NASCAR Xfinity Series, the second national professional stock car racing series sanctioned by NASCAR in the United States. The season started at Daytona International Speedway on February 20 and ended at Homestead–Miami Speedway on November 19. Daniel Suárez of Joe Gibbs Racing won the championship, becoming the first non-American to win a title in NASCAR's top 3 divisions.

This was the first year that the Xfinity Series (and the Truck Series) had a playoff system. Just like in the Cup Series, four drivers competed for the title in the final race at Homestead, also the final round of the playoffs. Those drivers are shown below.

== Teams and drivers ==
=== Complete schedule ===
| Manufacturer | Team | No. | Race driver | Crew chief |
|---|---|---|---|---|
| Chevrolet | Chip Ganassi Racing | 42 | Kyle Larson 16 | Mike Shiplett |
| Chevrolet | Chip Ganassi Racing | 42 | Justin Marks 17 | Mike Shiplett |
| Chevrolet | Chip Ganassi Racing | 48 | Brennan Poole (R) | Chad Norris |
| Chevrolet | Derrike Cope Racing with JP Motorsports | 70 | Derrike Cope 28 | Carlos Contreras 1 Danny Ketterman Jr. 32 |
| Chevrolet | Derrike Cope Racing with JP Motorsports | 70 | Timmy Hill 2 | Carlos Contreras 1 Danny Ketterman Jr. 32 |
| Chevrolet | Derrike Cope Racing with JP Motorsports | 70 | Dexter Stacey 3 | Carlos Contreras 1 Danny Ketterman Jr. 32 |
| Chevrolet | JD Motorsports | 0 | Eric McClure 1 | Matthew Lewis 5 Danny Gill 28 |
| Chevrolet | JD Motorsports | 0 | Garrett Smithley (R) 32 | Matthew Lewis 5 Danny Gill 28 |
| Chevrolet | JD Motorsports | 01 | Ryan Preece (R) | Zach McGowan 13; Ryan Bell 20 |
| Chevrolet | JD Motorsports | 4 | Ross Chastain | Brian Berry |
| Chevrolet | Jeremy Clements Racing | 51 | Jeremy Clements | Tony Clements |
| Chevrolet | Jimmy Means Racing | 52 | Joey Gase | Tim Brown |
| Chevrolet | JR Motorsports | 1 | Elliott Sadler | Kevin Meendering 32; Mike Bumgarner 1 |
| Chevrolet | JR Motorsports | 7 | Justin Allgaier | Jason Burdett |
| Chevrolet | JR Motorsports | 88 | Chase Elliott 5 | Dave Elenz |
| Chevrolet | JR Motorsports | 88 | Kevin Harvick 7 | Dave Elenz |
| Chevrolet | JR Motorsports | 88 | Dale Earnhardt Jr. 2 | Dave Elenz |
| Chevrolet | JR Motorsports | 88 | Alex Bowman 9 | Dave Elenz |
| Chevrolet | JR Motorsports | 88 | Cole Custer 2 | Dave Elenz |
| Chevrolet | JR Motorsports | 88 | Josh Berry 2 | Dave Elenz |
| Chevrolet | JR Motorsports | 88 | Kenny Habul 3 | Dave Elenz |
| Chevrolet | JR Motorsports | 88 | Regan Smith 2 | Dave Elenz |
| Chevrolet | JR Motorsports | 88 | Clint Bowyer 1 | Dave Elenz |
| Chevrolet | Kaulig Racing | 11 | Blake Koch | Chris Rice |
| Chevrolet | Obaika Racing | 97 | Harrison Rhodes 6 | Todd Myers 6 David Jones 1 Bobby Burrell 10; Kevyn Rebolledo 16 |
| Chevrolet | Obaika Racing | 97 | Ryan Ellis 8 | Todd Myers 6 David Jones 1 Bobby Burrell 10; Kevyn Rebolledo 16 |
| Chevrolet | Obaika Racing | 97 | Alex Guenette 3 | Todd Myers 6 David Jones 1 Bobby Burrell 10; Kevyn Rebolledo 16 |
| Chevrolet | Obaika Racing | 97 | T. J. Bell 4 | Todd Myers 6 David Jones 1 Bobby Burrell 10; Kevyn Rebolledo 16 |
| Chevrolet | Obaika Racing | 97 | Paige Decker 2 | Todd Myers 6 David Jones 1 Bobby Burrell 10; Kevyn Rebolledo 16 |
| Chevrolet | Obaika Racing | 97 | Matt Waltz 3 | Todd Myers 6 David Jones 1 Bobby Burrell 10; Kevyn Rebolledo 16 |
| Chevrolet | Obaika Racing | 97 | Josh Berry 1 | Todd Myers 6 David Jones 1 Bobby Burrell 10; Kevyn Rebolledo 16 |
| Chevrolet | Obaika Racing | 97 | Alli Owens 1 | Todd Myers 6 David Jones 1 Bobby Burrell 10; Kevyn Rebolledo 16 |
| Chevrolet | Obaika Racing | 97 | Jordan Anderson 3 | Todd Myers 6 David Jones 1 Bobby Burrell 10; Kevyn Rebolledo 16 |
| Chevrolet | Obaika Racing | 97 | Josh Bilicki 2 | Todd Myers 6 David Jones 1 Bobby Burrell 10; Kevyn Rebolledo 16 |
| Chevrolet | Richard Childress Racing | 2 | Austin Dillon 19 | Danny Stockman Jr. 19; Gil Martin 2 Justin Alexander 12 |
| Chevrolet | Richard Childress Racing | 2 | Paul Menard 8 | Danny Stockman Jr. 19; Gil Martin 2 Justin Alexander 12 |
| Chevrolet | Richard Childress Racing | 2 | Ben Kennedy 1 | Danny Stockman Jr. 19; Gil Martin 2 Justin Alexander 12 |
| Chevrolet | Richard Childress Racing | 2 | Sam Hornish Jr. 3 | Danny Stockman Jr. 19; Gil Martin 2 Justin Alexander 12 |
| Chevrolet | Richard Childress Racing | 2 | Michael McDowell 1 | Danny Stockman Jr. 19; Gil Martin 2 Justin Alexander 12 |
| Chevrolet | Richard Childress Racing | 2 | Regan Smith 1 (Note: Austin Dillon was originally scheduled to drive the No. 2 for the Use Your Melon Drive Sober 200. Due to the race being rescheduled on Sunday, RCR tabbed Smith to substitute for Dillon.) | Danny Stockman Jr. 19; Gil Martin 2 Justin Alexander 12 |
| Chevrolet | Richard Childress Racing | 3 | Ty Dillon | Danny Efland 2 Nick Harrison 30; Mike Hillman Jr. 1 |
| Chevrolet | Richard Childress Racing | 33 | Brandon Jones (R) | Mike Hillman Jr. 32; Nick Harrison 1 |
| Chevrolet | Richard Childress Racing | 62 | Brendan Gaughan | Shane Wilson |
| Chevrolet | RSS Racing | 39 | Ryan Sieg | Kevin Starland |
| Chevrolet | SS-Green Light Racing | 07 | Ray Black Jr. (R) | Jason Miller |
| Dodge | Mike Harmon Racing | 74 | Mike Harmon 30 | Carl Brown 1 Alan Collins Jr. 4 R. B. Bracken 28 |
| Dodge | Mike Harmon Racing | 74 | Nicolas Hammann 2 | Carl Brown 1 Alan Collins Jr. 4 R. B. Bracken 28 |
| Dodge | Mike Harmon Racing | 74 | Roger Reuse 1 | Carl Brown 1 Alan Collins Jr. 4 R. B. Bracken 28 |
| Ford | B. J. McLeod Motorsports | 78 | B. J. McLeod (R) | George Ingram 31; David Ingram 2 |
| Ford | Roush Fenway Racing | 6 | Bubba Wallace | Seth Barbour |
| Ford | Roush Fenway Racing | 16 | Ryan Reed | Phil Gould |
| Ford | Team Penske | 22 | Joey Logano 11 | Brian Wilson 22; Greg Erwin 11 |
| Ford | Team Penske | 22 | Brad Keselowski 15 | Brian Wilson 22; Greg Erwin 11 |
| Ford | Team Penske | 22 | Ryan Blaney 6 (Note: Joey Logano was originally scheduled to drive in the Use Your Melon Drive Sober 200 at Dover on Saturday. However, with the race rained out until Sunday, Team Penske opted to replace Logano with Ryan Blaney.) | Brian Wilson 22; Greg Erwin 11 |
| Ford | Team Penske | 22 | Alex Tagliani 1 | Brian Wilson 22; Greg Erwin 11 |
| Toyota | JGL Racing | 28 | Dakoda Armstrong 32 | Steven Lane 27; Wayne Setterington Jr. 6 |
| Toyota | JGL Racing | 28 | Drew Herring 1 | Steven Lane 27; Wayne Setterington Jr. 6 |
| Toyota | Joe Gibbs Racing | 18 | Bobby Labonte 1 | Chris Gayle |
| Toyota | Joe Gibbs Racing | 18 | Kyle Busch 17 | Chris Gayle |
| Toyota | Joe Gibbs Racing | 18 | Matt Tifft 7 | Chris Gayle |
| Toyota | Joe Gibbs Racing | 18 | Denny Hamlin 2 | Chris Gayle |
| Toyota | Joe Gibbs Racing | 18 | Sam Hornish Jr. 1 | Chris Gayle |
| Toyota | Joe Gibbs Racing | 18 | David Ragan 1 | Chris Gayle |
| Toyota | Joe Gibbs Racing | 18 | Dakoda Armstrong 1 | Chris Gayle |
| Toyota | Joe Gibbs Racing | 18 | Owen Kelly 2 | Chris Gayle |
| Toyota | Joe Gibbs Racing | 18 | Drew Herring 1 (Note: Kyle Busch was originally scheduled to drive the No. 18 in the Use Your Melon Drive Sober 200. However, due to the race being held on Sunday, Joe Gibbs Racing opted to replace Busch with Drew Herring) | Chris Gayle |
| Toyota | Joe Gibbs Racing | 19 | Daniel Suárez | Scott Graves |
| Toyota | Joe Gibbs Racing | 20 | Erik Jones (R) | Chris Gabehart |
| Toyota | TriStar Motorsports | 14 | Benny Gordon 3 | Eddie Pardue |
| Toyota | TriStar Motorsports | 14 | J. J. Yeley 6 | Eddie Pardue |
| Toyota | TriStar Motorsports | 14 | Jeff Green 15 | Eddie Pardue |
| Toyota | TriStar Motorsports | 14 | Tomy Drissi 2 | Eddie Pardue |
| Toyota | TriStar Motorsports | 14 | Mike Bliss 1 | Eddie Pardue |
| Toyota | TriStar Motorsports | 14 | Hermie Sadler 2 | Eddie Pardue |
| Toyota | TriStar Motorsports | 14 | Matt DiBenedetto 2 | Eddie Pardue |
| Toyota | TriStar Motorsports | 14 | Cole Whitt 2 | Eddie Pardue |
| Toyota | TriStar Motorsports | 44 | David Starr 7 | Frank Kerr 32; Bryan Smith 1 |
| Toyota | TriStar Motorsports | 44 | J. J. Yeley 26 | Frank Kerr 32; Bryan Smith 1 |
| Chevrolet | King Autosport | 90 | Martin Roy 8 | Guy Caron 20; Michael Rutland 2 Mario Gosselin 9 |
| Chevrolet | King Autosport | 90 | Mario Gosselin 18 | Guy Caron 20; Michael Rutland 2 Mario Gosselin 9 |
| Chevrolet | King Autosport | 90 | Alex Guenette 1 | Guy Caron 20; Michael Rutland 2 Mario Gosselin 9 |
| Chevrolet | King Autosport | 90 | Andy Lally 1 | Guy Caron 20; Michael Rutland 2 Mario Gosselin 9 |
| Chevrolet | King Autosport | 90 | James Davison 1 | Guy Caron 20; Michael Rutland 2 Mario Gosselin 9 |
| Chevrolet | King Autosport | 90 | Dexter Bean 1 | Guy Caron 20; Michael Rutland 2 Mario Gosselin 9 |
| Chevrolet | King Autosport | 90 | Alex Labbé 1 | Guy Caron 20; Michael Rutland 2 Mario Gosselin 9 |
| Chevrolet | SS-Green Light Racing | 90 | Todd Bodine 1 | Guy Caron 20; Michael Rutland 2 Mario Gosselin 9 |
| Ford | B. J. McLeod Motorsports | 90 | Todd Peck 1 | Keith Wolfe |
| Ford | B. J. McLeod Motorsports | 15 | Todd Peck 5 (Note: Todd Peck drove in the Axalta Faster. Tougher. Brighter. 200 with car number 15. Ryan Ellis crashed in Qualifying and his team could not fix the car in time for the race. Peck, who did not qualify for the race, took over the number 15 and was able to start with his (previously 99) B. J. McLeod Motorsports entered Ford.) | Paul Andrews 1 Joe Lax 1 George Church 1 Keith Wolfe 2 Jason Houghtaling 10; Jeff Spraker 1 Shannon Rursch; James Brooks |
| Ford | B. J. McLeod Motorsports | 15 | Travis Kvapil 7 | Paul Andrews 1 Joe Lax 1 George Church 1 Keith Wolfe 2 Jason Houghtaling 10; Jeff Spraker 1 Shannon Rursch; James Brooks |
| Ford | B. J. McLeod Motorsports | 15 | Cody Ware (R) 1 | Paul Andrews 1 Joe Lax 1 George Church 1 Keith Wolfe 2 Jason Houghtaling 10; Jeff Spraker 1 Shannon Rursch; James Brooks |
| Ford | B. J. McLeod Motorsports | 15 | Timmy Hill 1 | Paul Andrews 1 Joe Lax 1 George Church 1 Keith Wolfe 2 Jason Houghtaling 10; Jeff Spraker 1 Shannon Rursch; James Brooks |
| Ford | B. J. McLeod Motorsports | 15 | Scott Heckert 3 | Paul Andrews 1 Joe Lax 1 George Church 1 Keith Wolfe 2 Jason Houghtaling 10; Jeff Spraker 1 Shannon Rursch; James Brooks |
| Ford | B. J. McLeod Motorsports | 15 | Michael Lira 1 | Paul Andrews 1 Joe Lax 1 George Church 1 Keith Wolfe 2 Jason Houghtaling 10; Jeff Spraker 1 Shannon Rursch; James Brooks |
| Ford | B. J. McLeod Motorsports | 15 | Stanton Barrett 1 | Paul Andrews 1 Joe Lax 1 George Church 1 Keith Wolfe 2 Jason Houghtaling 10; Jeff Spraker 1 Shannon Rursch; James Brooks |
| Ford | B. J. McLeod Motorsports | 15 | Clint King 3 | Paul Andrews 1 Joe Lax 1 George Church 1 Keith Wolfe 2 Jason Houghtaling 10; Jeff Spraker 1 Shannon Rursch; James Brooks |
| Ford | B. J. McLeod Motorsports | 15 | Blake Jones 1 | Paul Andrews 1 Joe Lax 1 George Church 1 Keith Wolfe 2 Jason Houghtaling 10; Jeff Spraker 1 Shannon Rursch; James Brooks |
| Ford | B. J. McLeod Motorsports | 15 | Josh Wise 1 | Paul Andrews 1 Joe Lax 1 George Church 1 Keith Wolfe 2 Jason Houghtaling 10; Jeff Spraker 1 Shannon Rursch; James Brooks |
| Ford | B. J. McLeod Motorsports | 15 | Josh Reaume 1 | Paul Andrews 1 Joe Lax 1 George Church 1 Keith Wolfe 2 Jason Houghtaling 10; Jeff Spraker 1 Shannon Rursch; James Brooks |
| Ford | B. J. McLeod Motorsports | 15 | D. J. Kennington 1 | Paul Andrews 1 Joe Lax 1 George Church 1 Keith Wolfe 2 Jason Houghtaling 10; Jeff Spraker 1 Shannon Rursch; James Brooks |
| Chevrolet 2 Dodge 1 Ford 5 | Rick Ware Racing | 15 | Stanton Barrett 2 | Paul Andrews 1 Joe Lax 1 George Church 1 Keith Wolfe 2 Jason Houghtaling 10; Jeff Spraker 1 Shannon Rursch; James Brooks |
| Chevrolet 2 Dodge 1 Ford 5 | Rick Ware Racing | 15 | Cody Ware (R) 1 | Paul Andrews 1 Joe Lax 1 George Church 1 Keith Wolfe 2 Jason Houghtaling 10; Jeff Spraker 1 Shannon Rursch; James Brooks |
| Chevrolet 2 Dodge 1 Ford 5 | Rick Ware Racing | 15 | Ryan Ellis 2 | Paul Andrews 1 Joe Lax 1 George Church 1 Keith Wolfe 2 Jason Houghtaling 10; Jeff Spraker 1 Shannon Rursch; James Brooks |
| Chevrolet 2 Dodge 1 Ford 5 | Rick Ware Racing | 15 | Todd Peck 2 | Paul Andrews 1 Joe Lax 1 George Church 1 Keith Wolfe 2 Jason Houghtaling 10; Jeff Spraker 1 Shannon Rursch; James Brooks |
| Chevrolet 2 Dodge 1 Ford 5 | Rick Ware Racing | 15 | Jeff Green 1 | Paul Andrews 1 Joe Lax 1 George Church 1 Keith Wolfe 2 Jason Houghtaling 10; Jeff Spraker 1 Shannon Rursch; James Brooks |
| Chevrolet 17 Ford 3 | Rick Ware Racing | 25 | Cody Ware (R) 3 | Jeff Spraker 6 Joe Lax 9 George Church 2 |
| Chevrolet 17 Ford 3 | Rick Ware Racing | 25 | Harrison Rhodes 2 | Jeff Spraker 6 Joe Lax 9 George Church 2 |
| Chevrolet 17 Ford 3 | Rick Ware Racing | 25 | Ryan Ellis 6 | Jeff Spraker 6 Joe Lax 9 George Church 2 |
| Chevrolet 17 Ford 3 | Rick Ware Racing | 25 | Travis Kvapil 1 | Jeff Spraker 6 Joe Lax 9 George Church 2 |
| Chevrolet 17 Ford 3 | Rick Ware Racing | 25 | Scott Lagasse Jr. 1 | Jeff Spraker 6 Joe Lax 9 George Church 2 |
| Chevrolet 17 Ford 3 | Rick Ware Racing | 25 | Stanton Barrett 1 | Jeff Spraker 6 Joe Lax 9 George Church 2 |
| Chevrolet 17 Ford 3 | Rick Ware Racing | 25 | Spencer Boyd 1 | Jeff Spraker 6 Joe Lax 9 George Church 2 |
| Chevrolet 17 Ford 3 | Rick Ware Racing | 25 | Camden Murphy 1 | Jeff Spraker 6 Joe Lax 9 George Church 2 |
| Chevrolet 17 Ford 3 | Rick Ware Racing | 25 | Todd Peck 1 (Note: Todd Peck drove in the VisitMyrtleBeach.com 300 with car number 25. Chris Cockrum crashed his Chevrolet in First Practice and his team could not fix the car in time for the race and Cockrum WD. So, they called Peck to drive the 25 backup's car entered Ford in the race.) | Jeff Spraker 6 Joe Lax 9 George Church 2 |
| Chevrolet 17 Ford 3 | Rick Ware Racing | 25 | Jennifer Jo Cobb 1 | Jeff Spraker 6 Joe Lax 9 George Church 2 |
| Chevrolet 17 Ford 3 | Rick Ware Racing | 25 | Austin Theriault 1 | Jeff Spraker 6 Joe Lax 9 George Church 2 |
| Chevrolet 17 Ford 3 | Rick Ware Racing | 25 | Josh Reaume 1 | Jeff Spraker 6 Joe Lax 9 George Church 2 |
| Chevrolet | Chris Cockrum Racing | 25 | Chris Cockrum 7 | Jeff Spraker 6 Joe Lax 9 George Church 2 |
| Chevrolet | Obaika Racing | 25 | Austin Theriault 1 (Note: Austin Theriault drove in the Virginia 529 College Savings 250 with car number 25. Chris Cockrum crashed in Qualifying and his team could not fix the car in time for the race. Theriault, who did not qualify for the race, took over the number 25 and was able to start with his (previously 77) Obaika Racing entered Chevrolet.) | Jeff Spraker 6 Joe Lax 9 George Church 2 |
| Chevrolet | Team Kapusta Racing | 25 | Timmy Hill 2 | Jeff Spraker 6 Joe Lax 9 George Church 2 |
| Chevrolet | Team Kapusta Racing | 25 | Cody Ware (R) 1 | Jeff Spraker 6 Joe Lax 9 George Church 2 |
| Chevrolet | Team Kapusta Racing | 25 | Alex Kennedy 1 | Jeff Spraker 6 Joe Lax 9 George Church 2 |
| Chevrolet | Team Kapusta Racing | 25 | Austin Theriault 1 | Jeff Spraker 6 Joe Lax 9 George Church 2 |
| Ford | B. J. McLeod Motorsports | 25 | Todd Peck 1 | Jeff Spraker 6 Joe Lax 9 George Church 2 |
| Dodge 19 Toyota 8 Chevrolet 5 Ford 1 | MBM Motorsports | 13 | Mark Thompson 3 | Carl Long 1 Robbie May 1 George Lee II 3 Michael Rathje 8 George Church 3 David Jones 1 |
| Dodge 19 Toyota 8 Chevrolet 5 Ford 1 | MBM Motorsports | 13 | Josh Reaume 1 | Carl Long 1 Robbie May 1 George Lee II 3 Michael Rathje 8 George Church 3 David Jones 1 |
| Dodge 19 Toyota 8 Chevrolet 5 Ford 1 | MBM Motorsports | 13 | Derek White 1 | Carl Long 1 Robbie May 1 George Lee II 3 Michael Rathje 8 George Church 3 David Jones 1 |
| Dodge 19 Toyota 8 Chevrolet 5 Ford 1 | MBM Motorsports | 13 | D. J. Kennington 1 | Carl Long 1 Robbie May 1 George Lee II 3 Michael Rathje 8 George Church 3 David Jones 1 |
| Dodge 19 Toyota 8 Chevrolet 5 Ford 1 | MBM Motorsports | 13 | Carl Long 4 | Carl Long 1 Robbie May 1 George Lee II 3 Michael Rathje 8 George Church 3 David Jones 1 |
| Dodge 19 Toyota 8 Chevrolet 5 Ford 1 | MBM Motorsports | 13 | Matt DiBenedetto 1 | Carl Long 1 Robbie May 1 George Lee II 3 Michael Rathje 8 George Church 3 David Jones 1 |
| Dodge 19 Toyota 8 Chevrolet 5 Ford 1 | MBM Motorsports | 13 | Timmy Hill 6 (Note: Timmy Hill drove in the VisitMyrtleBeach.com 300 with car number 13 MBM Motorsports Toyota. Mark Thompson who was initially scheduled to drive the car let Timmy to drive in the race. Hill, initially did not qualify for the race with his MBM Motorsports 72 Dodge.) | Carl Long 1 Robbie May 1 George Lee II 3 Michael Rathje 8 George Church 3 David Jones 1 |
| Dodge 19 Toyota 8 Chevrolet 5 Ford 1 | MBM Motorsports | 13 | John Jackson 2 | Carl Long 1 Robbie May 1 George Lee II 3 Michael Rathje 8 George Church 3 David Jones 1 |
| Dodge 19 Toyota 8 Chevrolet 5 Ford 1 | MBM Motorsports | 13 | T. J. Bell 1 | Carl Long 1 Robbie May 1 George Lee II 3 Michael Rathje 8 George Church 3 David Jones 1 |
| Dodge 19 Toyota 8 Chevrolet 5 Ford 1 | MBM Motorsports | 13 | Harrison Rhodes 5 | Carl Long 1 Robbie May 1 George Lee II 3 Michael Rathje 8 George Church 3 David Jones 1 |
| Dodge 19 Toyota 8 Chevrolet 5 Ford 1 | MBM Motorsports | 13 | Stanton Barrett 1 | Carl Long 1 Robbie May 1 George Lee II 3 Michael Rathje 8 George Church 3 David Jones 1 |
| Dodge 19 Toyota 8 Chevrolet 5 Ford 1 | MBM Motorsports | 13 | Tim Cowen 1 | Carl Long 1 Robbie May 1 George Lee II 3 Michael Rathje 8 George Church 3 David Jones 1 |
| Dodge 19 Toyota 8 Chevrolet 5 Ford 1 | MBM Motorsports | 13 | Alon Day 1 | Carl Long 1 Robbie May 1 George Lee II 3 Michael Rathje 8 George Church 3 David Jones 1 |
| Dodge 19 Toyota 8 Chevrolet 5 Ford 1 | MBM Motorsports | 13 | Brandon Hightower 7 | Carl Long 1 Robbie May 1 George Lee II 3 Michael Rathje 8 George Church 3 David Jones 1 |
| Dodge 13 Toyota 18 Chevrolet 2 | MBM Motorsports | 40 | Derek White 1 | Robbie May 1 Sebastian Laforge 31; Carl Long 1 |
| Dodge 13 Toyota 18 Chevrolet 2 | MBM Motorsports | 40 | Carl Long 12 | Robbie May 1 Sebastian Laforge 31; Carl Long 1 |
| Dodge 13 Toyota 18 Chevrolet 2 | MBM Motorsports | 40 | Josh Reaume 1 | Robbie May 1 Sebastian Laforge 31; Carl Long 1 |
| Dodge 13 Toyota 18 Chevrolet 2 | MBM Motorsports | 40 | Josh Wise 1 | Robbie May 1 Sebastian Laforge 31; Carl Long 1 |
| Dodge 13 Toyota 18 Chevrolet 2 | MBM Motorsports | 40 | T. J. Bell 1 | Robbie May 1 Sebastian Laforge 31; Carl Long 1 |
| Dodge 13 Toyota 18 Chevrolet 2 | MBM Motorsports | 40 | John Jackson 5 | Robbie May 1 Sebastian Laforge 31; Carl Long 1 |
| Dodge 13 Toyota 18 Chevrolet 2 | MBM Motorsports | 40 | Timmy Hill 11 | Robbie May 1 Sebastian Laforge 31; Carl Long 1 |
| Dodge 13 Toyota 18 Chevrolet 2 | MBM Motorsports | 40 | Chris Cook 1 | Robbie May 1 Sebastian Laforge 31; Carl Long 1 |
| Dodge 13 Toyota 18 Chevrolet 2 | MBM Motorsports | 40 | Alon Day 1 | Robbie May 1 Sebastian Laforge 31; Carl Long 1 |

=== Limited schedule ===
| Manufacturer | Team | No. | Race driver | Crew chief | Rounds |
|---|---|---|---|---|---|
| Chevrolet | Athenian Motorsports | 05 | John Wes Townley | Michael Shelton | 2 |
| Chevrolet | Bobby Gerhart Racing | 85 | Bobby Gerhart | Billy Gerhart 1 Brian Keselowski 1 Mark Skibo 1 | 3 |
| Chevrolet | Brandonbilt Motorsports | 86 | Brandon Brown | Joey Cohen 1 Adam Brenner 2 | 3 |
| Chevrolet | GMS Racing | 21 | Spencer Gallagher | Joey Cohen | 7 |
| Chevrolet | Jimmy Means Racing | 79 | Josh Williams | Garrett Hinson | 1 |
| Chevrolet | JR Motorsports | 5 | Kasey Kahne | Ryan Pemberton 4 Matt Goslant 1 Richard Boswell 1 | 1 |
| Chevrolet | JR Motorsports | 5 | Chase Elliott | Ryan Pemberton 4 Matt Goslant 1 Richard Boswell 1 | 1 |
| Chevrolet | JR Motorsports | 5 | Cole Custer | Ryan Pemberton 4 Matt Goslant 1 Richard Boswell 1 | 4 |
| Chevrolet | King Autosport | 92 | Mario Gosselin | Michael Rutland 6 Mario Gosselin 2 Kevin Boykin 1 Guy Caron 1 | 3 |
| Chevrolet | King Autosport | 92 | Dexter Bean | Michael Rutland 6 Mario Gosselin 2 Kevin Boykin 1 Guy Caron 1 | 5 |
| Chevrolet | King Autosport | 92 | Josh Williams | Michael Rutland 6 Mario Gosselin 2 Kevin Boykin 1 Guy Caron 1 | 2 |
| Chevrolet | Precision Performance Motorsports | 46 | Anthony Kumpen | Mark Setzer | 1 |
| Chevrolet | Precision Performance Motorsports | 46 | Brandon Gdovic | Mark Setzer | 5 |
| Chevrolet | Precision Performance Motorsports | 46 | Jordan Anderson | Mark Setzer | 1 |
| Chevrolet | Obaika Racing | 77 | Claire Decker | Carlos Contreras | 1 |
| Chevrolet | Obaika Racing | 77 | T. J. Bell | Bobby Burrell | 4 |
| Chevrolet | Obaika Racing | 77 | Jordan Anderson | Bobby Burrell | 1 |
| Chevrolet | Obaika Racing | 77 | Josh Bilicki | Bobby Burrell | 1 |
| Chevrolet | Obaika Racing | 77 | Austin Theriault | Bobby Burrell | 1 |
| Chevrolet | Obaika Racing | 77 | Spencer Boyd | Bobby Burrell | 1 |
| Chevrolet | Obaika Racing | 77 | Matt Waltz | Bobby Burrell | 3 |
| Chevrolet | Obaika Racing | 77 | Ryan Ellis | Bobby Burrell | 4 |
| Chevrolet | RSS Racing | 93 | Scott Lagasse Jr. | Mark Gibson 3 Harry McMullen 18; Bruce Cook 11 | 1 |
| Chevrolet | RSS Racing | 93 | Josh Reaume | Mark Gibson 3 Harry McMullen 18; Bruce Cook 11 | 4 |
| Chevrolet | RSS Racing | 93 | Dylan Lupton | Mark Gibson 3 Harry McMullen 18; Bruce Cook 11 | 2 |
| Chevrolet | RSS Racing | 93 | Josh Wise | Mark Gibson 3 Harry McMullen 18; Bruce Cook 11 | 6 |
| Chevrolet | RSS Racing | 93 | David Starr | Mark Gibson 3 Harry McMullen 18; Bruce Cook 11 | 19 |
| Chevrolet | Shepherd Racing Ventures | 89 | Morgan Shepherd | Tony Furr 5 Nick Hoechst 19 | 30 |
| Ford | Biagi-DenBeste Racing | 98 | Aric Almirola | Jon Hanson | 10 |
| Ford | Biagi-DenBeste Racing | 98 | Jeb Burton | Jon Hanson | 3 |
| Ford | Biagi-DenBeste Racing | 98 | Nelson Piquet Jr. | Jon Hanson | 1 |
| Ford | B. J. McLeod Motorsports | 99 | Chris Fontaine | Jason Houghtaling 2 Keith Wolfe 2 Adam Brooks 1 Kevyn Rebolledo 3 | 1 |
| Ford | B. J. McLeod Motorsports | 99 | Todd Peck | Jason Houghtaling 2 Keith Wolfe 2 Adam Brooks 1 Kevyn Rebolledo 3 | 3 |
| Ford | B. J. McLeod Motorsports | 99 | Stanton Barrett | Jason Houghtaling 2 Keith Wolfe 2 Adam Brooks 1 Kevyn Rebolledo 3 | 1 |
| Ford | B. J. McLeod Motorsports | 99 | Jeff Green | Jason Houghtaling 2 Keith Wolfe 2 Adam Brooks 1 Kevyn Rebolledo 3 | 3 |
| Ford | Richard Petty Motorsports | 43 | Jeb Burton | Drew Blickensderfer | 11 |
| Ford | Roush Fenway Racing | 60 | Trevor Bayne | Drew Blickensderfer 3 Michael Tam 1 | 1 |
| Ford | Roush Fenway Racing | 60 | Gray Gaulding | Drew Blickensderfer 3 Michael Tam 1 | 2 |
| Ford | Roush Fenway Racing | 60 | Ricky Stenhouse Jr. | Drew Blickensderfer 3 Michael Tam 1 | 1 |
| Ford | Team Penske | 12 | Ryan Blaney | Greg Erwin 3 Brian Wilson 1 | 2 |
| Ford | Team Penske | 12 | Joey Logano | Greg Erwin 3 Brian Wilson 1 | 2 |
| Toyota | JGL Racing | 24 | Matt Tifft | Steven Gray 8 Ken Evans 4 Wayne Setterington 1 Steven Lane 6 | 3 |
| Toyota | JGL Racing | 24 | Corey LaJoie | Steven Gray 8 Ken Evans 4 Wayne Setterington 1 Steven Lane 6 | 10 |
| Toyota | JGL Racing | 24 | T. J. Bell | Steven Gray 8 Ken Evans 4 Wayne Setterington 1 Steven Lane 6 | 1 |
| Toyota | JGL Racing | 24 | Brandon McReynolds | Steven Gray 8 Ken Evans 4 Wayne Setterington 1 Steven Lane 6 | 2 |
| Toyota | JGL Racing | 24 | Drew Herring | Steven Gray 8 Ken Evans 4 Wayne Setterington 1 Steven Lane 6 | 3 |
| Toyota | NEMCO Motorsports | 87 | Joe Nemechek | Jim Mazza 1 Gere Kennon Jr. 1 | 2 |
| Toyota | TriStar Motorsports | 10 | Jeff Green | Ricky Viers 2 Robbie May 8 Doug Miller 3 John Mays 5 | 9 |
| Toyota | TriStar Motorsports | 10 | Matt DiBenedetto | Ricky Viers 2 Robbie May 8 Doug Miller 3 John Mays 5 | 17 |
| Toyota | TriStar Motorsports | 10 | Tyler Young | Ricky Viers 2 Robbie May 8 Doug Miller 3 John Mays 5 | 1 |
| Toyota | TriStar Motorsports | 10 | Mike Bliss | Ricky Viers 2 Robbie May 8 Doug Miller 3 John Mays 5 | 2 |
| Toyota | TriStar Motorsports | 10 | Josh Wise | Ricky Viers 2 Robbie May 8 Doug Miller 3 John Mays 5 | 1 |
| Chevrolet | MBM Motorsports | 72 | John Jackson | Todd Marcy | 1 |
| Dodge | MBM Motorsports | 72 | Timmy Hill | Steven Muchie | 1 |
| Chevrolet 1 Toyota 1 | Rick Ware Racing | 17 | Jeff Green | George Church 1 Ricky Viers 1 | 2 |

=== Changes ===
==== Teams ====
- The Roush Fenway Racing No. 1 and No. 60 cars, driven by Elliott Sadler and Chris Buescher respectively in 2015, would shut down, and Roush would downsize to two full-time teams. Sadler moved full-time to JR Motorsports, while Buescher moved up to the Sprint Cup Series full-time for Front Row Motorsports. The No. 60 team would field part-time with Trevor Bayne, Gray Gaulding and Ricky Stenhouse Jr. driving.
- Chip Ganassi Racing would field a full-time team for Brennan Poole in the No. 48 DC Solar Chevrolet. Poole ran about half the races in the HScott Motorsports with Chip Ganassi No. 42 in 2015. Chad Norris would be the crew chief, after being the crew chief for Bubba Wallace and Ryan Reed for Roush Fenway Racing in 2015.
- SS-Green Light Racing would move up from the Camping World Truck Series to the Xfinity Series with driver Ray Black Jr., crew chief Jason Miller and sponsorship from Scubalife in the No. 07.
- TriStar Motorsports would downsize to two full-time teams, shutting down the No. 8, No. 19 and No. 24. David Starr would remain in the No. 44 with the No. 14 to be announced.
- Kaulig Racing would start a full-time team. Blake Koch would drive the No. 11 LeafFilter Chevrolet with crew chief Chris Rice. Koch drove the No. 8 LeafFilter car for TriStar Motorsports in 2015.
- Rick Ware Racing would field the No. 25 Chevrolet as a second team in celebration of the organization's 25th anniversary.
- B. J. McLeod Motorsports would field two full-time Ford cars: the No. 78, which McLeod would drive, and the No. 99, which various drivers would drive. The cars were purchased from Roush Fenway Racing. The No. 99 team shut down earlier this season, due to points being low, and partnered with Rick Ware Racing to share the No. 15 team points.

==== Drivers ====
- 2015 NASCAR Camping World Truck Series champion Erik Jones moved to the Xfinity Series full-time for Joe Gibbs Racing in the No. 20. Jones also drove this car part-time in 2015.
- Joe Gibbs Racing renumbered the Daniel Suárez team from the No. 18 to the No. 19.
- Kyle Busch, Matt Tifft, Denny Hamlin, and Bobby Labonte would run the No. 18 for Joe Gibbs Racing in 2016, renumbered from No. 54.
- Justin Allgaier replaced Regan Smith in the JR Motorsports No. 7 with sponsorship from Brandt. Allgaier ran the HScott Motorsports No. 51 in the Sprint Cup Series in 2015. Smith moved back to the Cup Series full-time, driving the No. 7 Tommy Baldwin Racing Chevrolet.
- Elliott Sadler replaced Chase Elliott, who moved up to the Sprint Cup Series, in the JR Motorsports No. 1 (renumbered from No. 9). Sadler ran in the Roush Fenway Racing No. 1 in 2015.
- Chase Elliott, Alex Bowman, Cole Custer, and Kenny Habul joined Kevin Harvick, Josh Berry, and team owner Dale Earnhardt Jr. as drivers of the JR Motorsports No. 88, replacing Kasey Kahne, who drove 6 races in 2015, and Ben Rhodes, who drove 10 races in 2015. Habul drove 3 races for the Joe Gibbs Racing No. 20 in 2015.
- Austin Dillon, Paul Menard, Ben Kennedy, Sam Hornish Jr., A. J. Allmendinger and Michael McDowell replaced Brian Scott in the Richard Childress Racing No. 2. Dillon and Menard both ran part-time in the Childress No. 33 in 2015, while other drivers haven't. Scott moved up to the Sprint Cup Series, driving the No. 44 Richard Petty Motorsports Ford, renumbered from No. 9.
- Brandon Jones will move to the Xfinity Series full-time for Richard Childress Racing in the No. 33. Jones also drove this car part-time with Austin Dillon and Paul Menard in 2015.
- Jeb Burton replaced Dakoda Armstrong in the No. 43 Ford for Richard Petty Motorsports. Burton drove for BK Racing in the Sprint Cup Series in 2015. Burton's season came short due to team's lack of sponsorship.
- Dakoda Armstrong replaced J. J. Yeley in the JGL Racing No. 28 with sponsorship from WinField. Armstrong drove the No. 43 WinField car for Richard Petty Motorsports in 2015.
- Ryan Preece replaced Landon Cassill in the JD Motorsports No. 01. Preece drove five races in the Premium Motorsports No. 98 in the Sprint Cup Series in 2015. Cassill moves to the No. 38 Front Row Motorsports Ford in the Cup Series.
- Harrison Rhodes replaced various drivers in the Obaika Racing No. 97. Rhodes drove the JD Motorsports No. 0 for most of the races in 2015.

==== Crew chiefs ====
- Brian Wilson replaced Greg Erwin as the crew chief for Ryan Blaney, Brad Keselowski and Joey Logano in the Team Penske No. 22. He was the race engineer for Brad Keselowski's No. 2 Sprint Cup Series car in 2015. Wilson was replaced by Erwin after Watkins Glen, and later became the No. 12 team crew chief.
- Chris Gabehart replaced Mike Wheeler as crew chief for Erik Jones in the Joe Gibbs Racing No. 20. Gabehart was the race engineer for Denny Hamlin's No. 11 Cup Series car in 2015.
- Scott Graves replaced Eric Phillips as crew chief for Daniel Suárez in the Joe Gibbs Racing No. 19 (renumbered from No. 18). He was the crew chief for the 2015 champion Chris Buescher in the Roush Fenway Racing No. 60 the prior season.
- Kevin Meendering replaced Ernie Cope as crew chief for Elliott Sadler in the JR Motorsports No. 1 (renumbered from No. 9). He was the chief engineer for Dale Earnhardt Jr.'s No. 88 Cup Series car in 2015.
- Richard Childress Racing crew chiefs, Mike Hillman Jr. and Danny Stockman Jr., swapped cars. Hillman Jr. was the crew chief of Brandon Jones in the No. 33 after working with Brian Scott in the No. 2 in 2015. Stockman Jr. moved with Austin Dillon and Paul Menard from the No. 33 to the No. 2.
- Phil Gould replaced Chad Norris as crew chief for Ryan Reed in the Roush Fenway Racing No. 16. He was the crew chief for Roush's Elliott Sadler No. 1 car in 2015.
- Drew Blickensderfer replaced Frank Kerr for Jeb Burton in the Richard Petty Motorsports No. 43. Blickensderfer was the crew chief for 10 races for the Petty No. 9 Sprint Cup team in 2015.
- Frank Kerr replaced Greg Conner as crew chief for David Starr in the TriStar Motorsports No. 44. Kerr was the crew chief for the Richard Petty Motorsports No. 43 in 2015.
- Zach McGowan replaced Wayne Setterington as crew chief for Ryan Preece in the JD Motorsports No. 01. McGowan was the crew chief for Preece in his 5 races for Premium Motorsports in the Sprint Cup series in 2015.
- Brian Berry replaced Gary Cogswell as crew chief for Ross Chastain in the JD Motorsports No. 4.

== Rule changes ==
On January 19, NASCAR announced the introduction of a playoff format similar to the Chase for the Sprint Cup for the Xfinity Series and the Camping World Truck Series. After the 26-race regular season, the top-12 drivers will enter the Round of 12 (Kentucky, Dover and Charlotte), with championship points reset. The top-eight drivers will advance to the Round of 8 (Kansas, Texas and Phoenix). The top-four drivers will qualify to the Championship 4 at Homestead. Race winners will automatically advance to the next round. Additionally, the 16 drivers who qualified for the 2015 Chase for the Sprint Cup are ineligible to race at Homestead.

NASCAR also announced that Dash 4 Cash races would feature two heat races that determine the starting grid for the main event. If a driver is the highest finishing eligible driver in two of the races, they become eligible for the Xfinity Chase.

== Schedule ==
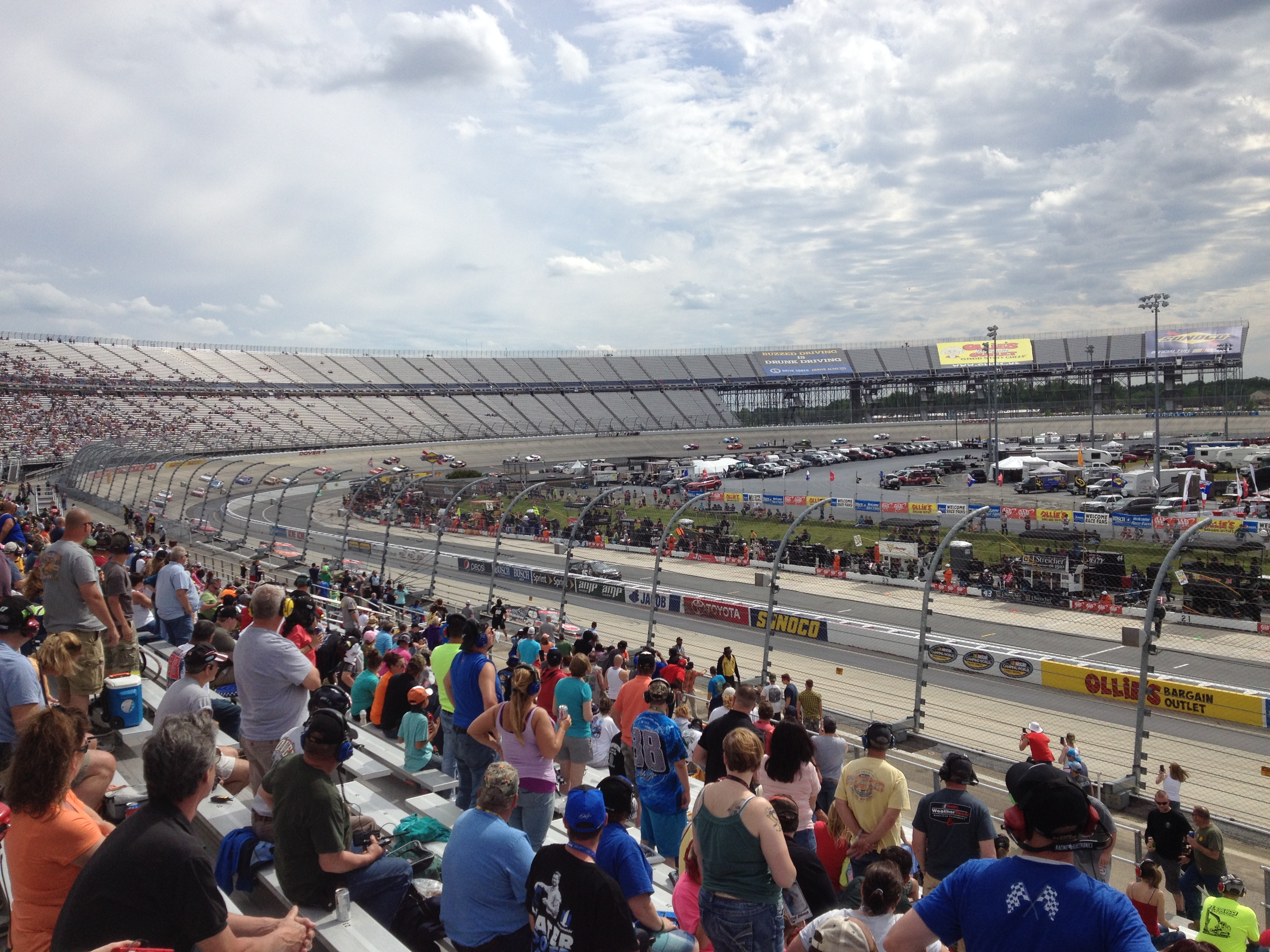
The Ollie's Bargain Outlet 200 at Dover International Speedway in May

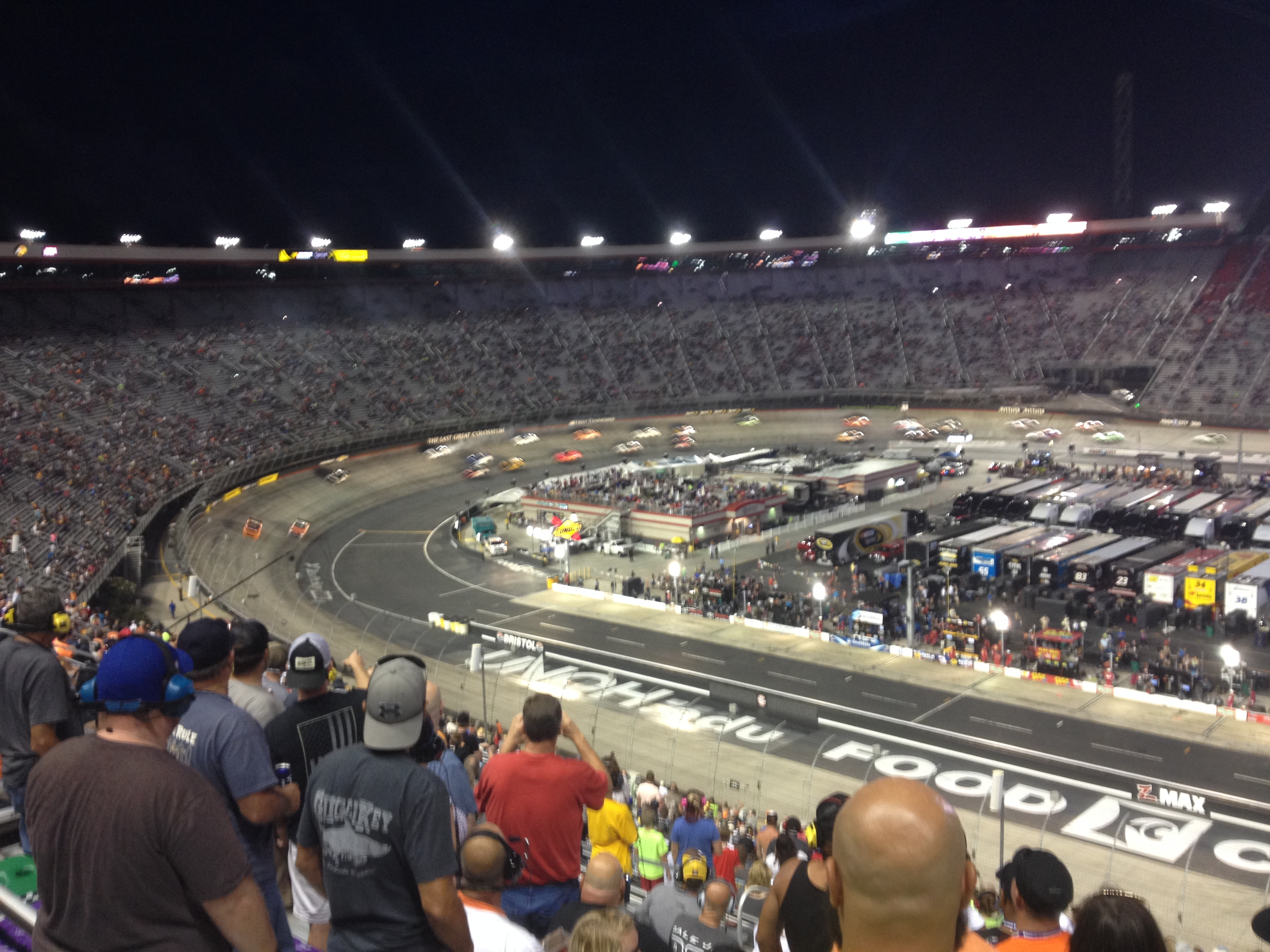
The Food City 300 at Bristol Motor Speedway in August

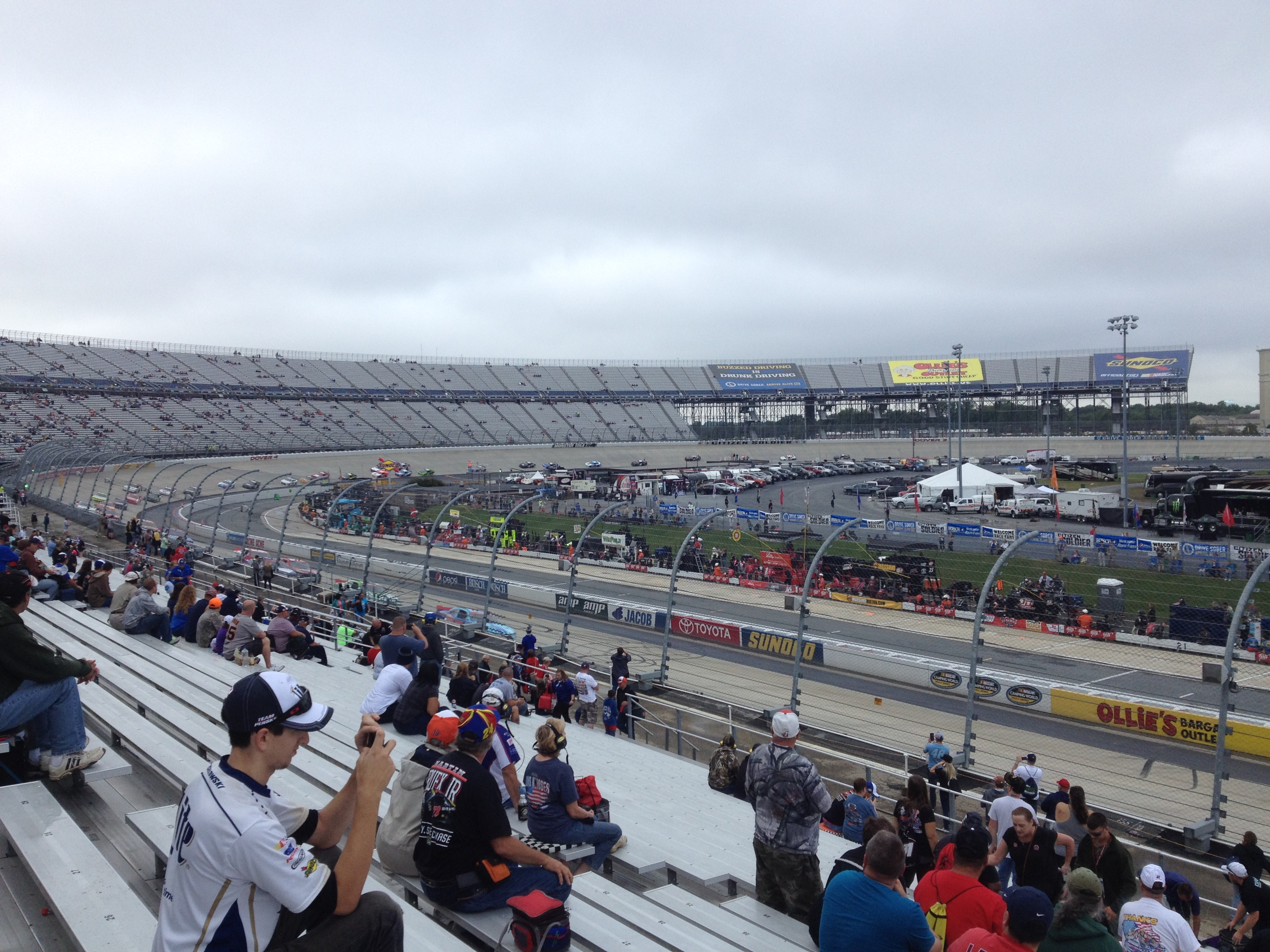
The Use Your Melon Drive Sober 200 at Dover International Speedway in October

| No | Date | Race title | Track | Location |
|---|---|---|---|---|
| 1 | February 20 | PowerShares QQQ 300 | Daytona International Speedway | Daytona Beach, Florida |
| 2 | February 27 | Heads Up Georgia 250 | Atlanta Motor Speedway | Hampton, Georgia |
| 3 | March 5 | Boyd Gaming 300 | Las Vegas Motor Speedway | Las Vegas, Nevada |
| 4 | March 12 | Axalta Faster. Tougher. Brighter. 200 | Phoenix International Raceway | Avondale, Arizona |
| 5 | March 19 | TreatMyClot.com 300 | Auto Club Speedway | Fontana, California |
| 6 | April 8 | O'Reilly Auto Parts 300 | Texas Motor Speedway | Fort Worth, Texas |
| 7 | April 16 | Fitzgerald Glider Kits 300 | Bristol Motor Speedway | Bristol, Tennessee |
| 8 | April 23 | ToyotaCare 250 | Richmond International Raceway | Richmond, Virginia |
| 9 | April 30 | Sparks Energy 300 | Talladega Superspeedway | Lincoln, Alabama |
| 10 | May 14 | Ollie's Bargain Outlet 200 | Dover International Speedway | Dover, Delaware |
| 11 | May 28 | Hisense 4K TV 300 | Charlotte Motor Speedway | Concord, North Carolina |
| 12 | June 4 | Pocono Green 250 | Pocono Raceway | Long Pond, Pennsylvania |
| 13 | June 11 | Menards 250 | Michigan International Speedway | Cambridge Township, Michigan |
| 14 | June 19 | American Ethanol E15 250 | Iowa Speedway | Newton, Iowa |
| 15 | July 1 | Subway Firecracker 250 | Daytona International Speedway | Daytona Beach, Florida |
| 16 | July 8 | Alsco 300 | Kentucky Speedway | Sparta, Kentucky |
| 17 | July 16 | AutoLotto 200 | New Hampshire Motor Speedway | Loudon, New Hampshire |
| 18 | July 23 | Lilly Diabetes 250 | Indianapolis Motor Speedway | Speedway, Indiana |
| 19 | July 30 | U.S. Cellular 250 | Iowa Speedway | Newton, Iowa |
| 20 | August 6 | Zippo 200 at The Glen | Watkins Glen International | Watkins Glen, New York |
| 21 | August 13 | Mid-Ohio Challenge | Mid-Ohio Sports Car Course | Lexington, Ohio |
| 22 | August 19 | Food City 300 | Bristol Motor Speedway | Bristol, Tennessee |
| 23 | August 27 | Road America 180 | Road America | Elkhart Lake, Wisconsin |
| 24 | September 3 | VFW Sport Clips Help a Hero 200 | Darlington Raceway | Darlington, South Carolina |
| 25 | September 9 | Virginia 529 College Savings 250 | Richmond International Raceway | Richmond, Virginia |
| 26 | September 17 | Drive for Safety 300 | Chicagoland Speedway | Joliet, Illinois |
Chase for the NASCAR Xfinity Series
Round of 12
| 27 | September 24 | VisitMyrtleBeach.com 300 | Kentucky Speedway | Sparta, Kentucky |
| 28 | October 2^{1} | Use Your Melon Drive Sober 200 | Dover International Speedway | Dover, Delaware |
| 29 | October 9^{2} | Drive for the Cure 300 | Charlotte Motor Speedway | Concord, North Carolina |
Round of 8
| 30 | October 15 | Kansas Lottery 300 | Kansas Speedway | Kansas City, Kansas |
| 31 | November 5 | O'Reilly Auto Parts Challenge | Texas Motor Speedway | Fort Worth, Texas |
| 32 | November 12 | Ticket Galaxy 200 | Phoenix International Raceway | Avondale, Arizona |
Championship 4
| 33 | November 19 | Ford EcoBoost 300 | Homestead–Miami Speedway | Homestead, Florida |

Dash 4 Cash races

=== Schedule changes and notes ===
- Pocono Raceway will host the Xfinity Series for the first time on June 4, 2016. The race will be 250 mi (400 km) in length and will replace the standalone June race held by Chicagoland Speedway.
- The four Dash4Cash races—Bristol, Richmond, Dover (all spring) and Indianapolis—will have reduced race distances in order to add additional heat races. The Bristol format is two 50-lap heat races and a 200-lap feature, Richmond will have 35-lap heat races and a 140-lap feature, Dover will have 40-lap heat races and a 120-lap feature and Indianapolis will have 20-lap heat races and a 60-lap feature.
- Due to NBCSN's coverage of the 2016 Summer Olympics, the Zippo 200 at The Glen was moved to CNBC and the Mid-Ohio 200 and Food City 300 to USA Network. The start of the Mid-Ohio race was moved to NBC Sports Live Extra due to USA's Olympic coverage overrunning.

== Results and standings ==
=== Races ===
| No. | Race | Pole position | Most Laps Led | Winning driver | Manufacturer | No. | Winning team |
|---|---|---|---|---|---|---|---|
| 1 | PowerShares QQQ 300 | Ty Dillon | Joey Logano | Chase Elliott | Chevrolet | 88 | JR Motorsports |
| 2 | Heads Up Georgia 250 | Kyle Busch | Kyle Busch | Kyle Busch | Toyota | 18 | Joe Gibbs Racing |
| 3 | Boyd Gaming 300 | Kyle Busch | Kyle Busch | Kyle Busch | Toyota | 18 | Joe Gibbs Racing |
| 4 | Axalta Faster. Tougher. Brighter. 200 | Erik Jones | Kyle Busch | Kyle Busch | Toyota | 18 | Joe Gibbs Racing |
| 5 | TreatMyClot.com 300 | Daniel Suárez | Kyle Busch | Austin Dillon | Chevrolet | 2 | Richard Childress Racing |
| 6 | O'Reilly Auto Parts 300 | Kyle Busch | Kyle Busch | Kyle Busch | Toyota | 18 | Joe Gibbs Racing |
| 7 | Fitzgerald Glider Kits 300 | Erik Jones | Kyle Larson | Erik Jones | Toyota | 20 | Joe Gibbs Racing |
| 8 | ToyotaCare 250 | Matt Tifft | Dale Earnhardt Jr. | Dale Earnhardt Jr. | Chevrolet | 88 | JR Motorsports |
| 9 | Sparks Energy 300 | Matt Tifft | Brandon Jones | Elliott Sadler | Chevrolet | 1 | JR Motorsports |
| 10 | Ollie's Bargain Outlet 200 | Erik Jones | Erik Jones | Erik Jones | Toyota | 20 | Joe Gibbs Racing |
| 11 | Hisense 4K TV 300 | Erik Jones | Denny Hamlin | Denny Hamlin | Toyota | 18 | Joe Gibbs Racing |
| 12 | Pocono Green 250 | Erik Jones | Kyle Larson | Kyle Larson | Chevrolet | 42 | Chip Ganassi Racing |
| 13 | Menards 250 | Alex Bowman | Kyle Busch | Daniel Suárez | Toyota | 19 | Joe Gibbs Racing |
| 14 | American Ethanol E15 250 | Erik Jones | Sam Hornish Jr. | Sam Hornish Jr. | Toyota | 18 | Joe Gibbs Racing |
| 15 | Subway Firecracker 250 | David Ragan | Joey Logano | Aric Almirola | Ford | 98 | Biagi-DenBeste Racing |
| 16 | Alsco 300 | Kyle Busch | Kyle Busch | Kyle Busch | Toyota | 18 | Joe Gibbs Racing |
| 17 | AutoLotto 200 | Kyle Busch | Kyle Busch | Kyle Busch | Toyota | 18 | Joe Gibbs Racing |
| 18 | Lilly Diabetes 250 | Kyle Busch | Kyle Busch | Kyle Busch | Toyota | 18 | Joe Gibbs Racing |
| 19 | U.S. Cellular 250 | Daniel Suárez | Erik Jones | Erik Jones | Toyota | 20 | Joe Gibbs Racing |
| 20 | Zippo 200 at The Glen | Joey Logano | Joey Logano | Joey Logano | Ford | 12 | Team Penske |
| 21 | Mid-Ohio Challenge | Sam Hornish Jr. | Justin Marks | Justin Marks | Chevrolet | 42 | Chip Ganassi Racing |
| 22 | Food City 300 | Erik Jones | Kyle Larson | Austin Dillon | Chevrolet | 2 | Richard Childress Racing |
| 23 | Road America 180 | Alex Tagliani | Michael McDowell | Michael McDowell | Chevrolet | 2 | Richard Childress Racing |
| 24 | VFW Sport Clips Help a Hero 200 | Paul Menard | Elliott Sadler | Elliott Sadler | Chevrolet | 1 | JR Motorsports |
| 25 | Virginia 529 College Savings 250 | Austin Dillon | Kyle Busch | Kyle Busch | Toyota | 18 | Joe Gibbs Racing |
| 26 | Drive for Safety 300 | Kyle Busch | Kyle Busch | Erik Jones | Toyota | 20 | Joe Gibbs Racing |
Chase for the NASCAR Xfinity Series
Round of 12
| 27 | VisitMyrtleBeach.com 300 | Erik Jones | Erik Jones | Elliott Sadler | Chevrolet | 1 | JR Motorsports |
| 28 | Use Your Melon Drive Sober 200 | Erik Jones | Daniel Suárez | Daniel Suárez | Toyota | 19 | Joe Gibbs Racing |
| 29 | Drive for the Cure 300 | Kyle Larson | Kyle Larson | Joey Logano | Ford | 12 | Team Penske |
Round of 8
| 30 | Kansas Lottery 300 | Kyle Busch | Kyle Busch | Kyle Busch | Toyota | 18 | Joe Gibbs Racing |
| 31 | O'Reilly Auto Parts Challenge | Brad Keselowski | Brad Keselowski | Kyle Larson | Chevrolet | 42 | Chip Ganassi Racing |
| 32 | Ticket Galaxy 200 | Kyle Busch | Kyle Busch | Kyle Busch | Toyota | 18 | Joe Gibbs Racing |
Championship 4
| 33 | Ford EcoBoost 300 | Daniel Suárez | Daniel Suárez | Daniel Suárez | Toyota | 19 | Joe Gibbs Racing |

=== Drivers' Championship ===
(key) Bold – Pole position awarded by time. Italics – Pole position set by final practice results or owner's points. * – Most laps led.
. – Eliminated after Round of 12 . – Eliminated after Round of 8

| Pos | Driver | DAY | ATL | LVS | PHO | CAL | TEX | BRI | RCH | TAL | DOV | CLT | POC | MCH | IOW | DAY | KEN | NHA | IND | IOW | GLN | MOH | BRI | ROA | DAR | RCH | CHI | KEN | DOV | CLT | KAN | TEX | PHO | HOM | Pts |
|---|---|---|---|---|---|---|---|---|---|---|---|---|---|---|---|---|---|---|---|---|---|---|---|---|---|---|---|---|---|---|---|---|---|---|---|
| 1 | Daniel Suárez | 8 | 7 | 2 | 3 | **4** | 16 | 6 | 4 | 7 | 9 | 12 | 9 | 1 | 4 | 32 | 3 | 4 | 7 | **30** | 4 | 23 | 30 | 4 | 3 | 8 | 4 | 2 | 1* | 3 | 3 | 5 | 5 | **1*** | 4040 |
| 2 | Elliott Sadler | 4 | 9 | 8 | 8 | 5 | 7 | 15 | 3 | 1 | 6 | 28 | 6 | 5 | 6 | 18 | 6 | 10 | 6 | 3 | 6 | 9 | 4 | 8 | 1* | 4 | 3 | 1 | 7 | 2 | 2 | 6 | 13 | 3 | 4038 |
| 3 | Justin Allgaier | 12 | 8 | 9 | 4 | 10 | 6 | 5 | 35 | 2 | **4** | 5 | 39 | 8 | 7 | 2 | 31 | 7 | 5 | 7 | 7 | 5 | 2 | 6 | 11 | 5 | 5 | 9 | 3 | 6 | 14 | 10 | 4 | 6 | 4035 |
| 4 | Erik Jones **(R)** | 31 | 3 | 3 | **2** | 15 | 2 | **1** | 34 | 21 | 1* | **31** | **2** | 4 | **27** | 10 | 4 | 2 | 22 | 1* | 12 | 6 | **33** | 21 | 6 | 2 | 1 | **28*** | **16** | 5 | 15 | 4 | 10 | 9 | 4032 |
Chase for the NASCAR Xfinity Series cut-off
| Pos | Driver | DAY | ATL | LVS | PHO | CAL | TEX | BRI | RCH | TAL | DOV | CLT | POC | MCH | IOW | DAY | KEN | NHA | IND | IOW | GLN | MOH | BRI | ROA | DAR | RCH | CHI | KEN | DOV | CLT | KAN | TEX | PHO | HOM | Pts |
| 5 | Ty Dillon | **13** | 5 | 7 | 6 | 17 | 13 | 7 | 2 | 19 | 5 | 8 | 3 | 15 | 2 | 14 | 7 | 33 | 9 | 2 | 11 | 4 | 25 | 12 | 12 | 6 | 11 | 27 | 2 | 11 | 12 | 16 | 7 | 2 | 2214 |
| 6 | Ryan Reed | 16 | 15 | 13 | 14 | 14 | 14 | 21 | 11 | 31 | 18 | 19 | 33 | 14 | 11 | 6 | 29 | 14 | 13 | 10 | 9 | 11 | 35 | 5 | 13 | 11 | 32 | 7 | 10 | 15 | 16 | 12 | 6 | 16 | 2205 |
| 7 | Blake Koch | 9 | 20 | 26 | 16 | 12 | 34 | 37 | 8 | 24 | 12 | 14 | 15 | 13 | 13 | 22 | 14 | 32 | 15 | 13 | 35 | 12 | 8 | 18 | 19 | 15 | 15 | 11 | 14 | 12 | 9 | 14 | 8 | 20 | 2200 |
| 8 | Brennan Poole **(R)** | 27 | 14 | 11 | 10 | 13 | 19 | 13 | 10 | 3 | 10 | 9 | 12 | 11 | 8 | 26 | 9 | 6 | 11 | 4 | 10 | 10 | 28 | 3 | 5 | 10 | 21 | 10 | 15 | 18 | 7 | 8 | 11 | 27 | 2192 |
| 9 | Ryan Sieg | 20 | 16 | 14 | 27 | 29 | 10 | 14 | 21 | 20 | 16 | 13 | 29 | 12 | 21 | 3 | 20 | 15 | 18 | 15 | 23 | 22 | 37 | 14 | 15 | 14 | 12 | 16 | 19 | 10 | 34 | 13 | 14 | 12 | 2171 |
| 10 | Brandon Jones **(R)** | 7 | 11 | 6 | 11 | 9 | 9 | 11 | 15 | 18* | 25 | 7 | 8 | 10 | 12 | 29 | 11 | 11 | 10 | 16 | 13 | 19 | 9 | 16 | 9 | 23 | 10 | 26 | 17 | 16 | 8 | 19 | 18 | 15 | 2168 |
| 11 | Bubba Wallace | 6 | 18 | 33 | 12 | 3 | 15 | 25 | 16 | 13 | 2 | 27 | 16 | 9 | 9 | 20 | 5 | 12 | 14 | 24 | 29 | 15 | 7 | 9 | 17 | 12 | 20 | 8 | 11 | 20 | 33 | 11 | 32 | 11 | 2163 |
| 12 | Brendan Gaughan | 10 | 13 | 10 | 13 | 7 | 12 | 16 | 7 | 5 | 15 | 10 | 14 | 18 | 15 | 5 | 13 | 9 | 16 | 11 | 8 | 8 | 5 | 2 | 16 | 18 | 8 | 6 | 9 | 13 | 31 | 15 | 35 | 8 | 2161 |
| 13 | Dakoda Armstrong | 14 | 21 | 22 | 18 | 22 | 26 | 30 | 14 | 34 | 21 | 21 | 18 | 24 | 17 | 12 | 18 | 17 | 20 | 5 | 18 | 21 | 18 | 13 | 18 | 16 | 22 | 18 | 20 | 19 | 20 | 20 | 19 | 19 | 718 |
| 14 | J. J. Yeley | | 19 | 21 | 20 | 27 | 38 | 38 | 12 | 22 | 11 | 23 | 13 | 20 | 20 | 17 | 17 | 16 | 19 | 14 | 15 | 35 | 27 | 10 | 14 | 20 | 14 | 14 | 8 | 27 | 10 | 17 | 17 | 13 | 706 |
| 15 | Jeremy Clements | 15 | 17 | 20 | 28 | 21 | 24 | 33 | 22 | 4 | 22 | 20 | 31 | 21 | 16 | 16 | 16 | 13 | 17 | 17 | 25 | 34 | 6 | 25 | 8 | 17 | 16 | 12 | 22 | 22 | 28 | 18 | 31 | 24 | 693 |
| 16 | Ross Chastain | 22 | 28 | 16 | 24 | 19 | 21 | 22 | 18 | 16 | 20 | 17 | 19 | 16 | 14 | 11 | 22 | 31 | 21 | 18 | 14 | 14 | 32 | 33 | 29 | 24 | 39 | 19 | 12 | 21 | 13 | 21 | 20 | 22 | 670 |
| 17 | Ryan Preece **(R)** | 40 | 22 | 18 | 21 | 25 | 28 | 19 | 23 | 15 | 39 | 22 | 17 | 19 | 32 | 34 | 15 | 19 | 25 | 34 | 27 | 17 | 15 | 11 | 10 | 26 | 17 | 30 | 18 | 23 | 32 | 22 | 22 | 21 | 597 |
| 18 | Garrett Smithley **(R)** | | 24 | 24 | 31 | 23 | 23 | 29 | 20 | 12 | 24 | 15 | 27 | 17 | 22 | 13 | 22 | 23 | 23 | 22 | 39 | 24 | 23 | 40 | 22 | 31 | 19 | 17 | 26 | 25 | 18 | 25 | 34 | 29 | 544 |
| 19 | Ray Black Jr. **(R)** | 33 | 33 | 25 | 25 | 37 | 22 | 20 | 24 | 29 | 17 | 37 | 21 | 23 | 30 | 39 | 19 | 21 | 33 | 20 | 20 | 30 | 14 | 15 | 21 | 25 | 28 | 20 | 24 | 28 | 19 | 27 | 36 | 28 | 515 |
| 20 | B. J. McLeod **(R)** | 24 | 26 | 27 | 29 | 33 | 29 | 28 | 28 | 36 | 19 | 25 | 22 | 34 | 19 | 40 | 23 | 20 | 26 | 23 | 26 | 27 | 19 | 28 | 37 | 32 | 24 | 21 | 33 | 30 | 22 | 28 | 25 | 31 | 459 |
| 21 | Joey Gase | 32 | 32 | 28 | 33 | 28 | 27 | 31 | 26 | 38 | 23 | 36 | 23 | 25 | 25 | 19 | 27 | 25 | 28 | 24 | 32 | 28 | 22 | 22 | 24 | 27 | 26 | 31 | 27 | 32 | 23 | 31 | 24 | 37 | 437 |
| 22 | David Starr | 18 | 39 | 23 | 22 | 38 | 18 | 17 | | | | | | | | 27 | 21 | 36 | 24 | 21 | DNQ | 25 | 16 | 24 | 23 | 21 | 18 | 33 | 28 | 29 | 24 | 24 | DNQ | DNQ | 374 |
| 23 | Justin Marks | | | 34 | 15 | | | | 13 | 11 | 40 | | | 22 | 18 | 37 | 12 | 18 | | 19 | | 1* | | 32 | | 22 | | 15 | 31 | | | | 15 | | 347 |
| 24 | Jeb Burton | 25 | 10 | 17 | 17 | 16 | 35 | 12 | 19 | 17 | 13 | 11 | Wth | | | | | | 12 | | | | | | | 19 | | | | 17 | | | | | 335 |
| 25 | Alex Bowman | | | | | | | | | | 3 | | 10 | **7** | 5 | | | 8 | | | | | | | | 9 | | | 5 | | | | 38 | 14 | 273 |
| 26 | Mario Gosselin | DNQ | 25 | 29 | 35 | 26 | | 24 | | 28 | 28 | | 20 | 35 | 24 | 33 | | 24 | 29 | 25 | | 39^{1} | 17 | | 26 | 33 | | | 23 | | | | | 38 | 257 |
| 27 | Mike Harmon | DNQ | 30 | 31 | 38 | 32 | 33 | 36 | 36 | DNQ | 32 | 35 | 30 | 29 | 28 | DNQ | 30 | 30 | 35 | 28 | | | 36 | | 31 | 38 | 30 | 24 | 30 | 38 | 30 | 32 | 29 | DNQ | 235 |
| 28 | Jeff Green | 37 | 40 | 40 | 40 | | DNQ | 27 | 37 | 40 | 33 | 34 | 34 | 33 | 33 | 7 | 33 | 34 | 36 | 31 | 33 | 40 | | 39 | 30 | | 31 | 32 | 32 | 37 | 21 | 40 | 37 | 32 | 219 |
| 29 | Derrike Cope | DNQ | 27 | DNQ | 34 | 34 | 31 | 34 | 30 | DNQ | 35 | 32 | 37 | 31 | 34 | DNQ | 35 | 35 | 32 | 33 | 31 | | 29 | | 25 | 34 | 37 | 29 | 29 | 36 | 38 | | | | 202 |
| 30 | Ryan Ellis | | | QL | QL | | 30 | 35 | 29 | 35 | 31 | | 25 | | | 15 | | | 30 | | 30 | 18 | | | 33 | | 27 | 22 | 36 | DNQ | 36 | 33 | DNQ | DNQ | 191 |
| 31 | Corey LaJoie | | 23 | 19 | | 18 | | | | | | | | | | 30 | | 37 | | | | | 10 | | | | | | 6 | | | 23 | 33 | 35 | 177 |
| 32 | Sam Hornish Jr. | | | | | | | | | | | | | | 1* | | | | | 6 | | **2** | | | | | | 4 | | | | | | | 157 |
| 33 | Harrison Rhodes | DNQ | 35 | 32 | 30 | 35 | | 26 | 27 | | | 24 | | 26 | 26 | | 38 | | 34 | | | | 38 | | | | | | | | | | | | 121 |
| 34 | Drew Herring | | | | | | | | | | 14 | 18 | | | 29 | | | | | 12 | | | | | | | | | 21 | | | | | | 111 |
| 35 | Martin Roy | 38 | | | | | 25 | | | | | 26 | | 27 | | | | | | | | | | | | | 23 | | | 31 | 26 | 30 | | | 102 |
| 36 | Morgan Shepherd | 36 | 37 | 39 | 39 | DNQ | Wth | DNQ | 39 | 39 | 36 | DNQ | 35 | 36 | 37 | 35 | 37 | 39 | 37 | 35 | Wth | Wth | 39 | 37 | 34 | DNQ | 34 | 38 | 34 | 39 | DNQ | 39 | DNQ | DNQ | 94 |
| 37 | Brandon Gdovic | | | | | | | 18 | | | | | 26 | | | | | | 27 | | | | 21 | | | | | | | | | | 21 | | 92 |
| 38 | Todd Peck | | 38 | DNQ | 37 | 30 | 37 | | 32 | | | | 28 | 30 | | | 34 | | 40 | | | | | | 28 | | | 25 | | | | | | | 92 |
| 39 | T. J. Bell | | | | 26 | | | | | | | DNQ | 32 | 28 | | | 28 | 27 | DNQ | 38 | 38 | 32 | 31 | | | | | | | | | | | | 89 |
| 40 | Stanton Barrett | DNQ | | 30 | | | | | | | | | | | | | | | 31 | | 19 | 20 | | 27 | | | | | | | | | | | 78 |
| 41 | Josh Berry | | | | | | | | | | | | | | | | | | | 9 | | | | | 27 | | | 13 | | | | | | | 74 |
| 42 | Carl Long | | 36 | 37 | | DNQ | 39 | DNQ | 38 | 30 | 34 | 30 | 38 | | 38 | DNQ | | 38 | | | | | | | 32 | | 38 | | | | | | | | 64 |
| 43 | Brandon Hightower | | | | | | | | | | | | | | | | | | | | | | | | | 35 | | | 25 | 34 | 39 | 35 | 26 | 30 | 63 |
| 44 | Chris Cockrum | 28 | 29 | | | | | | | 37 | | | | 32 | | | | 29 | | | | | | | | QL | | QL | | 35 | | | | | 56 |
| 45 | Cody Ware **(R)** | | 31 | 35 | | 31 | 36 | | | | | 38 | | | | | | | | | 21 | | | | | | | | | | | | | | 54 |
| 46 | Scott Heckert | | | | | | | | | | | | | | | | | 26 | | | 16 | | | 29 | | | | | | | | | | | 52 |
| 47 | Benny Gordon | 35 | | | | | | | | 14 | | | | | | 23 | | | | | | | | | | | | | | | | | | | 51 |
| 48 | Owen Kelly | | | | | | | | | | | | | | | | | | | | | 16 | | 17 | | | | | | | | | | | 50 |
| 49 | Alex Guenette | | | | | | | | | | 27 | | 24 | | | 38 | 26 | | | | | | | | | | | | | | | | | | 49 |
| 50 | Clint King | | | | | | | | | | | | | | | | | | | | | | | | | 30 | | | | 26 | | 26 | | | 41 |
| 51 | Matt Waltz | | | | | | | | | | | | | | | | | 28 | | 35 | | | | | | | | 36 | 35 | | 37 | 34 | | | 41 |
| 52 | Josh Reaume | | 34 | 38 | DNQ | | | | | DNQ | 37 | | | | 40 | | | | | | | | | | | | | | | | 27 | | | 33 | 37 |
| 53 | Kenny Habul | | | | | | | | | | | | | | | | | | | | 17 | 36 | | 34 | | | | | | | | | | | 36 |
| 54 | Dexter Bean | | | | | | | | | | | | | | 36 | | 36 | | Wth | DNQ | | | | Wth | 38 | | 36 | 23 | Wth | Wth | | | | | 36 |
| 55 | Andy Lally | | | | | | | | | | | | | | | | | | | | | 7 | | | | | | | | | | | | | 35 |
| 56 | Alex Tagliani | | | | | | | | | | | | | | | | | | | | | | | **7** | | | | | | | | | | | 35 |
| 57 | Scott Lagasse Jr. | 29 | Wth | | | | | | | | | | | | | 25 | | | | | | | | | | | | | | | | | | | 28 |
| 58 | Dylan Lupton | | | | 19 | 36 | | | | | | | | | | | | | | | | | | | | | | | | | | | | | 27 |
| 59 | Brandon McReynolds | | | | | | | | | 23 | | | | | | | | | | 32 | | | | | | | | | | | | | | | 27 |
| 60 | Bobby Gerhart | 39 | | | | | | | | 33 | | | | | | 24 | | | | | | | | | | | | | | | | | | | 27 |
| 61 | John Jackson | | | | | | | | | 32 | | | | 37 | Wth | | 39 | | | 40 | | | | 35 | 39^{1} | | | 39 | | | | | | | 24 |
| 62 | Josh Bilicki | | | | | | | | | | | | | | | | | | | | | | | 38 | | | | | | | | | 28 | 34 | 23 |
| 63 | James Davison | | | | | | | | | | | | | | | | | | | | | | | 19 | | | | | | | | | | | 22 |
| 64 | Tomy Drissi | | | | | | | | | | | | | | | | | | | | 36 | | | 26 | | | | | | | | | | | 20 |
| 65 | Hermie Sadler | | | | | | | | | | | | | | | | | | | | | | 34 | | | 28 | | | | | | | | | 20 |
| 66 | Paige Decker | | | | | | | | | | | | | | 31 | | | | | | | | | 31 | | | | | | | | | | | 20 |
| 67 | Alex Labbé | | | | | | | | | | | | | | | | | | | | | | | | | | | | | | | | 23 | | 18 |
| 68 | Nicolas Hammann | | | | | | | | | | | | | | | | | | | | 28 | | | 36 | | | | | | | | | | | 18 |
| 69 | D. J. Kennington | | | | 36 | | | | | | | | | | | | | | | | | | | | | | | | | | | | 30 | | 16 |
| 70 | Anthony Kumpen | 26 | | | | | | | | | | | | | | | | | | | | | | | | | | | | | | | | | 15 |
| 71 | Michael Lira | | | | | | | | | | | | | | | | | | | 26 | | | | | | | | | | | | | | | 15 |
| 72 | Camden Murphy | | | | | | | | | | | | | | | | | | | | | | 26 | | | | | | | | | | | | 15 |
| 73 | Eric McClure | 30 | | | | | | | | | | | | | | | | | | | | | | | | | | | | | | | | | 11 |
| 74 | Mark Thompson | DNQ | | | | | | | | | | | | | | 31 | | | | | | | | | | | | QL | | | | | | | 11 |
| 75 | Roger Reuse | | | | | | | | | | | | | | | | | | | | | 33 | | | | | | | | | | | | | 8 |
| 76 | Todd Bodine | | | | | | | | | | | | | | | | | | | | 34 | | | | | | | | | | | | | | 7 |
| 77 | Blake Jones | | | | | | | | | | | | | | | | | | | | | | | | | | | 35 | | | | | | | 6 |
| 78 | Derek White | DNQ | | 36 | | | | | | | | | | | | | | | | | | | | | | | | | | | | | | | 5 |
| 79 | Alli Owens | | | | | | | | | | | | | | | | | | | | | | | | | 36 | | | | | | | | | 5 |
| 80 | Josh Williams | | | | | | | | | | | | | 38^{1} | | | | DNQ | | | | | | | | | | 37 | | | | | | | 4 |
| 81 | Dexter Stacey | | | | | | | | | | | | | | | | | | | | | | | | | | | | | | | 37 | DNQ | DNQ | 4 |
| 82 | Tim Cowen | | | | | | | | | | | | | | | | | | | | | 37 | | | | | | | | | | | | | 4 |
| 83 | Nelson Piquet Jr. | | | | | | | | | | | | | | | | | | | | | 38 | | | | | | | | | | | | | 3 |
| 84 | Chris Cook | | | | | | | | | | | | | | | | | | | | 40 | | | | | | | | | | | | | | 1 |
| | Claire Decker | | | | | | | | | | | | | | DNQ | | | | | | | | | | | | | | | | | | | | 0 |
Ineligible for Xfinity Series driver points
| Pos. | Driver | DAY | ATL | LVS | PHO | CAL | TEX | BRI | RCH | TAL | DOV | CLT | POC | MCH | IOW | DAY | KEN | NHA | IND | IOW | GLN | MOH | BRI | ROA | DAR | RCH | CHI | KEN | DOV | CLT | KAN | TEX | PHO | HOM | Pts |
| | Kyle Busch | | **1*** | **1*** | 1* | 2* | **1*** | 2 | | | | | 4 | 2* | | | **1*** | **1*** | **1*** | | 37 | | 24 | | | 1* | **13*** | | QL | | **1*** | | **1*** | | |
| | Austin Dillon | 5 | | 5 | 7 | 1 | 8 | 4 | 5 | 6 | | 2 | | | | 28 | 2 | 5 | | | | | 1 | | | **7** | | | QL | 14 | 17 | 7 | 2 | 5 | |
| | Kyle Larson | 34 | 2 | | | 8 | 11 | 3* | | | | 6 | 1* | | | | | | 4 | | 3 | | 3* | | 4 | | 2 | | | 4* | 5 | 1 | | 7 | |
| | Joey Logano | 2* | | | | | | 9 | | 27 | 7 | 3 | 5 | 6 | | 4* | | | 8 | | **1*** | | | | | | 7 | | QL | 1 | 4 | | | | |
| | Denny Hamlin | | | | | | | | | | | 1* | | | | | | | | | | | | | 2 | | | | | | | | | | |
| | Chase Elliott | 1 | | 4 | 5 | | 4 | | | 9 | | | | | | 9 | | | | | | | | | | | | | | | | | | | |
| | Dale Earnhardt Jr. | | | | | | 5 | | 1* | | | | | | | | | | | | | | | | | | | | | | | | | | |
| | Aric Almirola | 11 | | 12 | | 11 | 17 | 10 | | 10 | | | 11 | | | 1 | | | | | | | | | | | | | | | | | 12 | 10 | |
| | Michael McDowell | | | | | | | | | | | | | | | | | | | | | | | 1* | | | | | | | | | | | |
| | Brad Keselowski | | 6 | 15 | 9 | | 3 | | 9 | | | | | | 3 | | 10 | 3 | | 8 | 24 | | 12 | | | 3 | | | | 9 | | **2*** | 9 | | |
| | Paul Menard | | 4 | | | | | | | | 29 | | 7 | 3 | | | | | 3 | | 2 | | | | 20 | | 9 | | | | | | | | |
| | Kevin Harvick | | 12 | | | 6 | | 8 | | | | | | | | | | | 2 | | | | | | 35 | | | | | 7 | | 3 | | | |
| | Ryan Blaney | | | | | 20 | | | | | | 16 | | | | | 8 | | | | | 3 | | | 7 | | | 3 | 4 | | | | | 4 | |
| | Kasey Kahne | 3 | | | | | | | | | | | | | | | | | | | | | | | | | | | | | | | | | |
| | Ricky Stenhouse Jr. | | | | | | | | | | | | | | | | | | | | | | | | | | | | | | | | 3 | | |
| | Cole Custer | | | | | | | | 6 | | | 4 | | | | | 32 | | | | | | | | | | | | | DNQ | 35 | | | 17 | |
| | Matt Tifft | 21 | | | | | 20 | 23 | 33 | **8** | 8 | | | | | | | | | | | | | | | | | 5 | | 8 | | 9 | | 25 | |
| | Trevor Bayne | | | | | | | | | | | | | | | | | | | | 5 | | | | | | | | | | | | | | |
| | Regan Smith | | | | | | | | | | | | | | | | | | | | | | 11 | | | | | | 13 | | 6 | | | | |
| | Clint Bowyer | | | | | | | | | | | | | | | | | | | | | | | | | | 6 | | | | | | | | |
| | Spencer Gallagher | | | | 23 | 24 | | | 17 | | | 29 | | | | 8 | | | | | 22 | | | | | | | | | 24 | | | | | |
| | Ben Kennedy | | | | | | | | | | | | | | 10 | | | | | | | | | | | | | | | | | | | | |
| | Matt DiBenedetto | | | | | 40 | 32 | 40 | Wth | | 38 | 40 | 40 | 40 | | | 40 | 40 | 38 | | | | 40 | | 40 | 40 | 40 | | 40 | DNQ | 11 | 36 | 40 | 40 | |
| | Gray Gaulding | | | | | | | | | | | | | | | | | | | | | | 13 | | | 13 | | | | | | | | | |
| | Alon Day | | | | | | | | | | | | | | | | | | | | | 13 | | 30 | | | | | | | | | | | |
| | Cole Whitt | | | | | | | | | | | | | | | | | | | | | | | | | | | | | | | | 16 | 18 | |
| | John Wes Townley | 17 | | | | | | | | 26 | | | | | | Wth | | | | | | | | | | | | | | | | | | | |
| | Joe Nemechek | 19 | | | | | | | | | | | | | | 36 | | | | | | | | | | | | | | | | | | | |
| | Travis Kvapil | | | | | | | | 25 | 25 | 30 | | | | 23 | | 25 | | Wth | | | | 20 | | | | 33 | | | | | | | 26 | |
| | Alex Kennedy | | | | | | | | | | | | | | | | | | | | | | | 20 | | | | | | | | | | | |
| | David Ragan | | | | | | | | | | | | | | | **21** | | | | | | | | | | | | | | | | | | | |
| | Timmy Hill | | | | 32 | | | 32 | 31 | | 26 | 33 | | | 35 | | | 22 | 39 | 37 | | 29 | DNQ | 23 | 36 | 39 | 25 | 34 | 38 | 40 | 40 | 38 | 39 | 39 | |
| | Brandon Brown | | | | | | | | | | | | | | | | | | | | | | | | | 29 | | | | Wth | 25 | | | 23 | |
| | Bobby Labonte | 23 | | | | | | | | | | | | | | | | | | | | | | | | | | | | | | | | | |
| | Mike Bliss | | | | | | | | | | | | | | | | | | | 39 | | 26 | | | | | | 40 | | | | | | | |
| | Austin Theriault | | | | | | | | | | | | | | | | | | | | | | | | | 37 | | | | | | 29 | 27 | | |
| | Jordan Anderson | | | | | | | | | | | | | | | | | | | | | 31 | | | | | 29 | | 37 | 33 | | | | 36 | |
| | Spencer Boyd | | | | | | | | | | | | | | | | | | | 29 | | | | | | | 35 | | | | | | | | |
| | Jennifer Jo Cobb | | | | | | | | | | | | | | | | | | | | | | | | | | | | | | 29 | | | | |
| | Josh Wise | | | | | 39 | 40 | 39 | 40 | | | 39 | 36 | 39 | | | | | | | | | | | | | | | 39 | | DNQ | | | | |
| | Tyler Young | | | | | | | | | | | | | | 39 | | | | | | | | | | | | | | | | | | | | |
| | Chris Fontaine | DNQ | | | | | | | | | | | | | | | | | | | | | | | | | | | | | | | | | |
| Pos. | Driver | DAY | ATL | LVS | PHO | CAL | TEX | BRI | RCH | TAL | DOV | CLT | POC | MCH | IOW | DAY | KEN | NHA | IND | IOW | GLN | MOH | BRI | ROA | DAR | RCH | CHI | KEN | DOV | CLT | KAN | TEX | PHO | HOM | Pts |
^{1} Post entry, driver and owner did not score points.

=== Owners' championship (Top 15) ===
(key) Bold - Pole position awarded by time. Italics - Pole position set by final practice results or rainout. * – Most laps led.
. – Eliminated after Round of 12 . – Eliminated after Round of 8

| Pos. | No. | Car Owner | DAY | ATL | LVS | PHO | CAL | TEX | BRI | RCH | TAL | DOV | CLT | POC | MCH | IOW | DAY | KEN | NHA | IND | IOW | GLN | MOH | BRI | ROA | DAR | RCH | CHI | KEN | DOV | CLT | KAN | TEX | PHO | HOM | Points |
|---|---|---|---|---|---|---|---|---|---|---|---|---|---|---|---|---|---|---|---|---|---|---|---|---|---|---|---|---|---|---|---|---|---|---|---|---|
| 1 | 19 | Joe Gibbs | 8 | 7 | 2 | 3 | **4** | 16 | 6 | 5 | 7 | 9 | 12 | 9 | 1 | 4 | 32 | 3 | 4 | 7 | **30** | 4 | 23 | 30 | 4 | 3 | 8 | 4 | 2 | 1* | 3 | 3 | 5 | 5 | 1* | 4040 |
| 2 | 1 | Dale Earnhardt Jr. | 4 | 9 | 8 | 8 | 5 | 7 | 15 | 3 | 1* | 6 | 28 | 6 | 5 | 6 | 18 | 6 | 10 | 6 | 3 | 6 | 9 | 4 | 8 | 1* | 4 | 3 | 1 | 7 | 2 | 2 | 6 | 13 | 3 | 4038 |
| 3 | 22 | Roger Penske | 2* | 6 | 15 | 9 | 20 | 3 | 9 | 9 | 27 | 7 | 3 | 5 | 6 | 3 | 4* | 10 | 3 | 8 | 8 | 24 | 3 | 11 | **7** | 7 | 3 | 7 | 3 | 4 | 9 | 4 | **2*** | 9 | 4 | 4037 |
| 4 | 18 | J. D. Gibbs | 23 | **1*** | **1*** | 1* | 2* | **1*** | 2 | 33 | **8** | 8 | 1* | 4 | 2* | 1* | **21** | **1*** | **1*** | **1*** | 5 | 37 | 16 | 24 | 17 | 2 | 1* | **13*** | 5 | 21 | 8 | **1*** | 9 | **1*** | 25 | 4016 |
Chase for the NASCAR Xfinity Series cut-off
| 5 | 7 | Kelley Earnhardt Miller | 12 | 8 | 9 | 4 | 10 | 6 | 5 | 35 | 2 | 4 | 5 | 39 | 8 | 7 | 2 | 31 | 7 | 5 | 7 | 7 | 5 | 2 | 6 | 11 | 5 | 5 | 9 | 3 | 6 | 14 | 10 | 4 | 6 | 2239 |
| 6 | 2 | Richard Childress | 5 | 4 | 5 | 7 | 1 | 8 | 4 | 5 | 6 | 29 | 2 | 7 | 3 | 10 | 28 | 2 | 5 | 3 | 6 | 2 | **2** | 1 | 1* | **20** | **7** | 9 | 4 | 13 | 14 | 17 | 7 | 2 | 5 | 2234 |
| 7 | 42 | Chip Ganassi | 34 | 2 | 34 | 15 | 8 | 11 | 3* | 15 | 11 | 40 | 6 | 1* | 22 | 18 | 37 | 12 | 18 | 4 | 19 | 3 | 1* | 3* | 32 | 4 | 22 | 2 | 15 | 31 | **4*** | 5 | 1 | 15 | 7 | 2222 |
| 8 | 20 | Joe Gibbs | 31 | 3 | 3 | **2** | 15 | 2 | **1** | 34 | 21 | **1*** | **34** | **2** | 4 | **27** | 10 | 4 | 2 | 22 | 1* | 12 | 6 | **33** | 21 | 6 | 2 | 1 | **28*** | **16** | 5 | 15 | 4 | 10 | 9 | 2220 |
| 9 | 3 | Richard Childress | **13** | 5 | 7 | 6 | 17 | 13 | 7 | 2 | 19 | 5 | 8 | 3 | 15 | 2 | 14 | 7 | 33 | 9 | 2 | 11 | 4 | 25 | 12 | 12 | 6 | 11 | 27 | 2 | 11 | 12 | 16 | 7 | 2 | 2214 |
| 10 | 88 | Rick Hendrick | 1 | 12 | 4 | 5 | 6 | 5 | 8 | 1 | 9 | 3 | 4 | 10 | 7 | 5 | 9 | 32 | 8 | 2 | 9 | 17 | 36 | 11 | 34 | 35 | 9 | 6 | 13 | 6 | 7 | 6 | 3 | 38 | 14 | 2198 |
| 11 | 48 | Chip Ganassi | 27 | 14 | 11 | 10 | 13 | 19 | 13 | 10 | 3 | 10 | 9 | 12 | 11 | 8 | 26 | 9 | 6 | 11 | 4 | 10 | 10 | 28 | 3 | 5 | 10 | 21 | 10 | 15 | 18 | 7 | 8 | 11 | 27 | 2192 |
| 12 | 62 | Richard Childress | 10 | 13 | 10 | 13 | 7 | 12 | 16 | 7 | 5 | 15 | 10 | 14 | 18 | 15 | 5 | 13 | 9 | 16 | 11 | 8 | 8 | 5 | 2 | 16 | 18 | 8 | 6 | 9 | 13 | 31 | 15 | 35 | 8 | 2161 |
| 13 | 33 | Richard Childress | 7 | 11 | 6 | 11 | 9 | 9 | 11 | 15 | 18 | 25 | 7 | 8 | 10 | 12 | 29 | 11 | 11 | 10 | 16 | 13 | 19 | 9 | 16 | 9 | 23 | 10 | 26 | 17 | 16 | 8 | 19 | 18 | 15 | 901 |
| 14 | 6 | Jack Roush | 6 | 18 | 33 | 12 | 3 | 15 | 25 | 16 | 13 | 2 | 27 | 16 | 9 | 9 | 20 | 5 | 12 | 14 | 24 | 29 | 15 | 7 | 9 | 17 | 12 | 20 | 8 | 11 | 20 | 33 | 11 | 32 | 11 | 843 |
| 15 | 16 | Jack Roush | 16 | 15 | 13 | 14 | 14 | 14 | 21 | 11 | 31 | 18 | 19 | 33 | 14 | 11 | 6 | 29 | 14 | 13 | 10 | 9 | 11 | 35 | 5 | 13 | 11 | 32 | 7 | 10 | 15 | 16 | 12 | 6 | 16 | 840 |
| Pos. | No. | Car Owner | DAY | ATL | LVS | PHO | CAL | TEX | BRI | RCH | TAL | DOV | CLT | POC | MCH | IOW | DAY | KEN | NHA | IND | IOW | GLN | MOH | BRI | ROA | DAR | RCH | CHI | KEN | DOV | CLT | KAN | TEX | PHO | HOM | Points |

=== Manufacturers' championship ===
| Pos | Manufacturer | Wins | Points |
|---|---|---|---|
| 1 | Toyota | 19 | 1362 |
| 2 | Chevrolet | 11 | 1341 |
| 3 | Ford | 3 | 1219 |
| 4 | Dodge | 0 | 361 |

== See also ==
- 2016 NASCAR Sprint Cup Series
- 2016 NASCAR Camping World Truck Series
- 2016 NASCAR K&N Pro Series East
- 2016 NASCAR K&N Pro Series West
- 2016 NASCAR Whelen Modified Tour
- 2016 NASCAR Whelen Southern Modified Tour
- 2016 NASCAR Pinty's Series
- 2016 NASCAR Whelen Euro Series

== Notes ==
- ^1The Use Your Melon Drive Sober 200 at Dover International Speedway was postponed from October 1 to 2 because of inclement weather.
- ^2The Drive for the Cure 300 at Charlotte Motor Speedway was postponed from October 7 to 9 because of Hurricane Matthew.
