= Scott Graves =

NASCAR crew chief

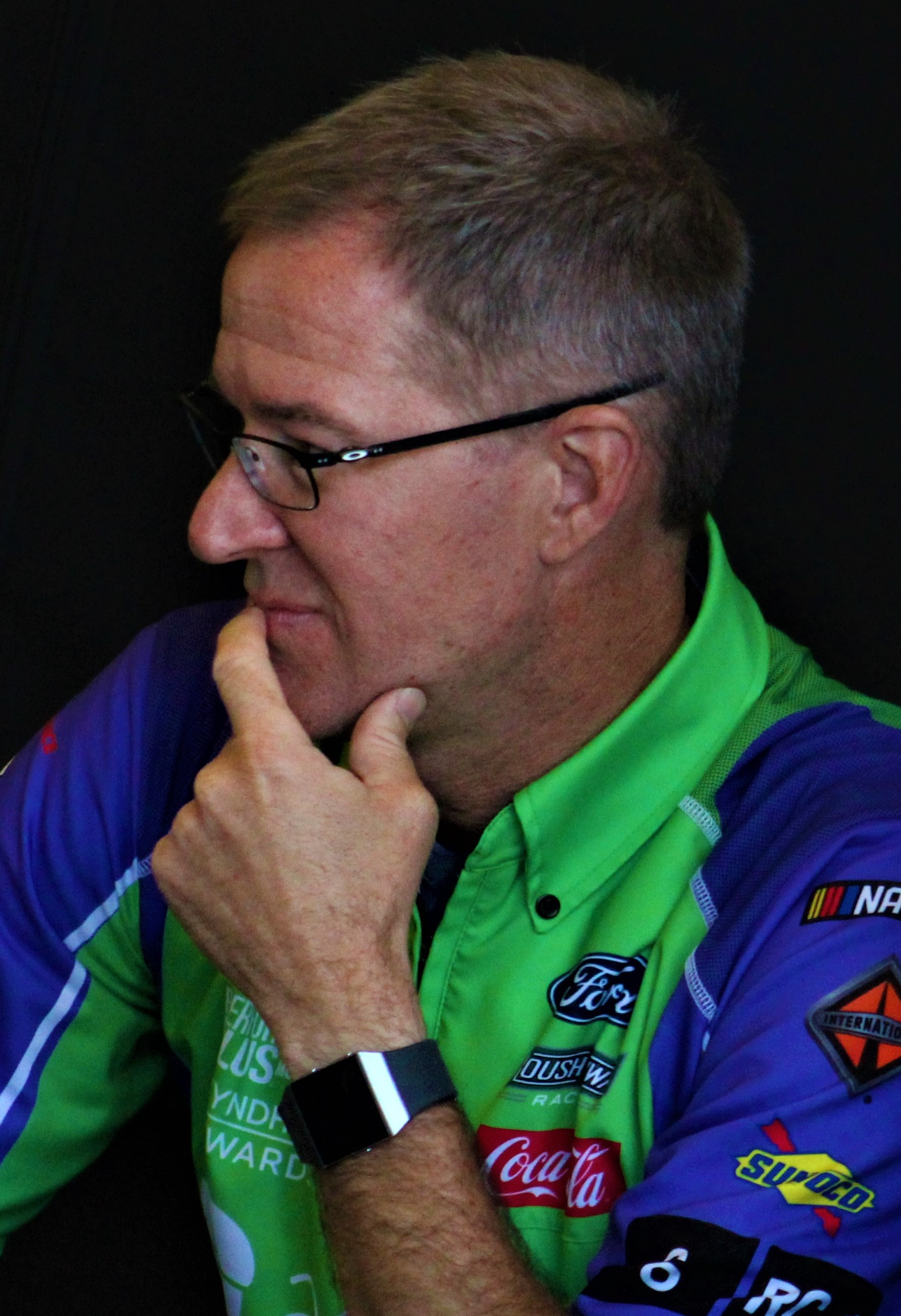
- Graves in 2019

Personal information
- Born: Scott R. Graves; November 7, 1974 (age 52) Clifton Springs, New York, U.S.
- Education: Texas Tech University
- Occupation: Crew chief
- Years active: 2006-present

Sport
- Country: United States
- Sport: Motor racing
- League: NASCAR Cup Series
- Team: 17. RFK Racing

Scott Graves (born November 7, 1974) is an American crew chief who works for RFK Racing as the crew chief of their No. 17 Ford Mustang Dark Horse in the NASCAR Cup Series driven by Chris Buescher.

Graves won the 2015 NASCAR Xfinity Series championship with Buescher, and in 2016 with Daniel Suárez.

== Crew chief career ==
=== Roush Fenway Racing ===
Graves joined Roush Racing for the 2006 NASCAR Craftsman Truck Series as the engineer for the No. 99 truck driven by Erik Darnell, helping Darnell win Rookie of the Year honors.

Graves, before he began working as a crew chief, worked as an engineer for RFK Racing, where in 2011, helped Carl Edwards win the Owners Championship. The next season, He got promoted to crew chief, where he helped Edwards win at Watkins Glen International, his very first race as crew chief.

Graves was promoted to the Sprint Cup Series in 2013, helping Ricky Stenhouse Jr. win NASCAR ROTY honors. Graves was paired with Chris Buescher in 2015. Graves later helped Buescher win the championship as his crew chief.

=== Joe Gibbs Racing ===
In 2016, Graves moved to Joe Gibbs Racing to join Daniel Suárez in the No. 19. Graves helped Suárez win the Championship that year.

Graves stayed as a crew chief for JGR's Xfinity program in 2017, after Suárez moved up to the Monster Energy Cup Series, helping Kyle Busch win Atlanta. Graves later reunited with Suárez again, after his crew chief, Dave Rogers, took an indefinite leave of absence. Suárez stayed consistent enough to finish second in the 2017 ROTY class, just behind Erik Jones. Graves stayed with Suárez in 2018, however Graves was replaced by Rogers following Dover in the fall.

=== Return to RFR/RFK ===
Shortly after his departure from Suárez and JGR, Graves returned to RFR to become Ryan Newman's crew chief in 2019. Newman stayed consistent enough to make the playoffs, but was eliminated after Charlotte.

Graves stuck with Newman in 2020. A scary crash on the last lap of the 2020 Daytona 500 sidelined Newman, making Ross Chastain pilot the No. 6. Newman returned to racing after a three month break due to the COVID-19 pandemic. Graves retained his spot as Newman's crew chief in 2021 until the Charlotte Roval, where Luke Lambert and Graves would swap, Graves was the crew chief for the No. 17, reuniting with Chris Buescher for the first time since 2015.

Graves would stay as the crew chief for Buescher in 2022, he would also become Zane Smith's crew chief for St. Louis after Buescher was sidelined due to COVID-19. Graves was suspended for four races after a loose wheel came off Buescher's car at Nashville. Graves would return at Michigan after an unsuccessful appeal. Despite missing the playoffs, Graves would return to victory lane at Bristol.

Graves and Buescher would be successful together in 2023, winning back to back races at Richmond, and Michigan. They would also end up winning Daytona. Unfortunately, they were eliminated after Martinsville. In 2024, they would remain consistent, despite barely missing the playoffs, they would win at Watkins Glen. In 2025, Graves was suspended for Charlotte after the No. 17 team was handed a L1 penalty following Kansas.
