= 2017 in motorsport =

The following is an overview of the events of 2017 in motorsport, including the major racing events, motorsport venues that were opened and closed during a year, championships and non-championship events that were established and disestablished in a year, and births and deaths of racing drivers and other motorsport people.

== Annual events ==
The calendar includes only annual major non-championship events or annual events that had significance separate from the championship. For the dates of the championship events see related season articles.

Date	Event	Ref
2–14 January	39th Dakar Rally	
21–22 January	28th Race of Champions	
28–29 January	55th 24 Hours of Daytona	
26 February	59th Daytona 500	
18 March	65th 12 Hours of Sebring	
22–23 April	40th 24 Hours of Le Mans Moto	
27–28 May	45th 24 Hours of Nürburgring	
28 May	75th Monaco Grand Prix	
28 May	101st Indianapolis 500	
3–9 June	99th Isle of Man TT	
17–18 June	85th 24 Hours of Le Mans	
25 June	95th Pikes Peak International Hill Climb	
29–30 July	69th 24 Hours of Spa	
30 July	40th Suzuka 8 Hours	
16–17 September	81st Bol d'Or	
8 October	60th Bathurst 1000	
14–18 November	50th Baja 1000	
19 November	64th Macau Grand Prix	

== Established championships/events ==
First race	Championship	Ref
10–11 January	24H Proto Series	
13 January	TCR Middle East Series	
8 April	Blancpain GT Series Asia	
15 April	FIA Formula 2 Championship	
15 April	GT4 European Series Southern Cup	
29 April	TCR Iberico Touring Car Series	
17 June	TCR China Touring Car Championship	
1 October	FIA Intercontinental Drifting Cup	

== Disestablished championships/events ==
Last race	Championship	Ref
18 November	TCR International Series	
18 November	World Series Formula V8 3.5	
1 December	World Touring Car Championship	

== Opened motorsport venues ==
Date	Venue	First event	Ref
15 July	Brooklyn Street Circuit	New York ePrix	
29 July	Montreal Street Circuit	Montreal ePrix	

== Deaths ==
Date	Month	Name	Age	Nationality	Occupation	Note	Ref
24	January	Chuck Weyant	93	American	Racing driver		
10	March	John Surtees	83	British	Motorcycle racer Racing driver	World champion in MotoGP (1956, 1958, 1959, 1960) and Formula One (1964)	
12	March	Patrick Nève	67	Belgian	Racing driver		
2	April	Sam Ard	78	American	Racing driver	NASCAR Late Model champion	
5	April	Tim Parnell	84	British	Racing driver		
27	April	Joe Leonard	84	American	Motorcycle racer Racing driver	1954, 1956 and 1967 AMA Grand National champion 1971 and 1972 USAC champion	
28	April	Billy Scott	68	American	Racing driver		
30	April	Preston Henn	86	American	Racing driver	Also known as entrepreneur (Fort Lauderdale Swap Shop)	
4	May	Timo Mäkinen	79	Finnish	Rally driver	One of the Flying Finns	
18	May	Jim McElreath	89	American	Racing driver	1966 USAC runner-up	
22	May	Nicky Hayden	35	American	Motorcycle racer	2006 MotoGP champion	
18	July	Erich Waxenberger	86	German	Engineer and racing driver	Creator of the Rote Sau.	
26	July	Leo Kinnunen	73	Finnish	Racing driver	First Finnish Formula One driver.	
1	August	Bud Moore	75	American	Racing driver	Raced in NASCAR.	
3	August	Ángel Nieto	70	Spanish	Motorcycle racer	Winner of 13 Grand Prix World Championships.	
19	August	Shane Sieg	34	American	Racing driver	Raced in NASCAR Camping World Truck Series.	
21	August	Don Nichols	92	American	Team owner	Founded Shadow Racing Cars.	
15	September	Bruce Leven	79	American	Racing driver/team owner	Triple 12 Hours of Sebring winner (1981, 1987 and 1988)	
19	September	John Nicholson	75	New Zealander	Racing driver	Founded Nicholson-McLaren engines, classified in 1975 British Grand Prix.	
9	October	Bill Puterbaugh	81	American	Racing driver	1975 Indianapolis 500 Rookie of the Year.	
25	October	Gaspar Ronda	91	American	Drag racer and restaurateur		
17	December	Bob Glidden	73	American	Drag racer		

== See also ==
- List of 2017 motorsport champions
