= Greg Erwin =

American crew chief

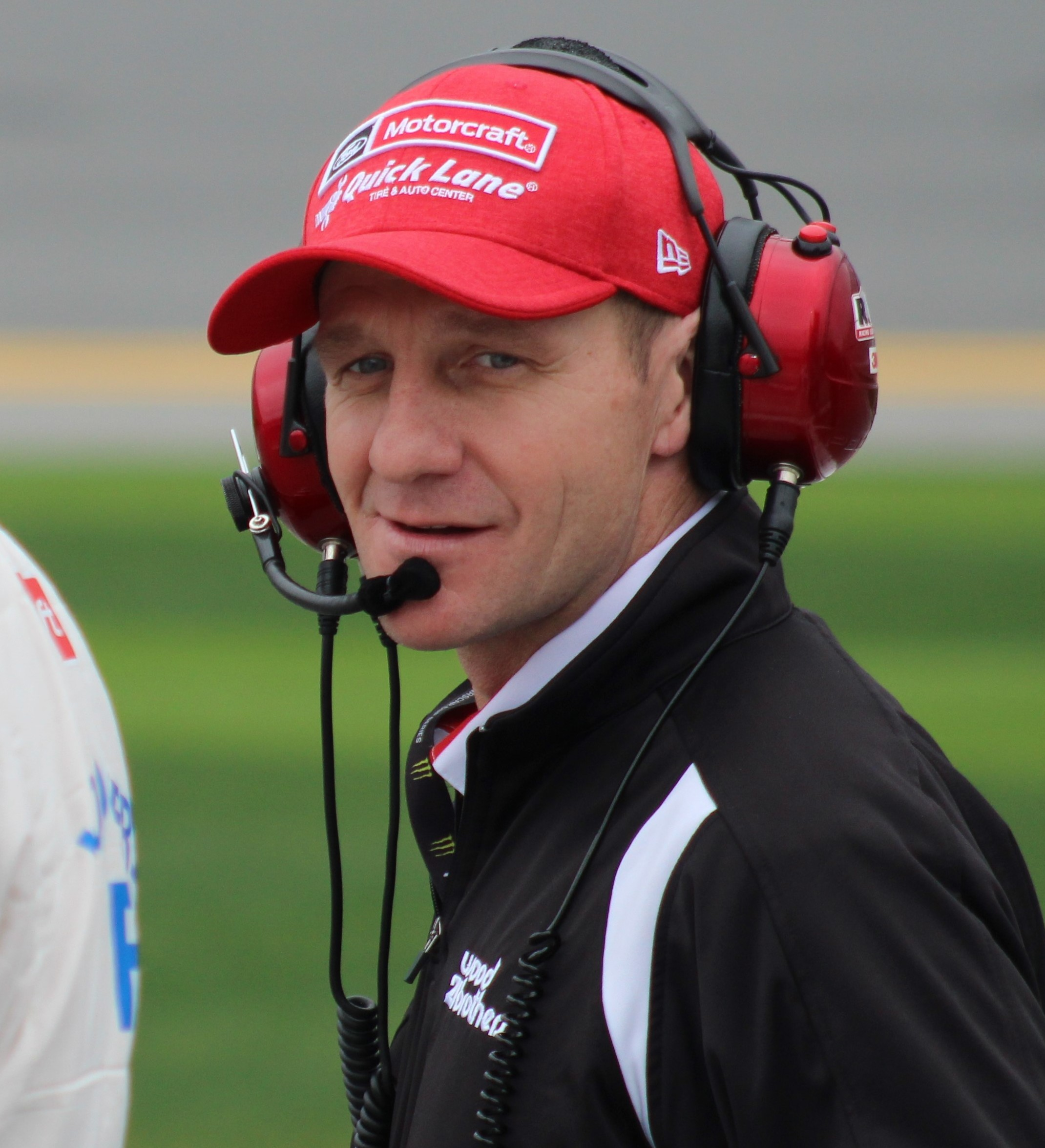
- Erwin at Daytona International Speedway in 2019

Personal information
- Born: Gregory A. Erwin; April 19, 1970 (age 56) Hatboro, Pennsylvania, U.S.
- Education: Clemson University
- Years active: 1995–present

Sport
- Country: United States
- Sport: NASCAR Cup Series

Gregory A. Erwin (born April 19, 1970) is an American stock car racing crew chief. He has worked as the crew chief for Robby Gordon Motorsports, Roush Fenway Racing, Team Penske, and Wood Brothers Racing at the NASCAR Cup Series, and for Penske in the NASCAR Xfinity Series. Erwin was also the team manager of Team Penske in the Xfinity Series in 2016.

== Early life ==
Erwin was born in Hatboro, Pennsylvania and in high school, his father bought his first oval track race car. Erwin worked on the team during high school and every summer while attended Clemson University. He earned an engineering degree from Clemson in 1992 returning for graduate school in 1993 with a motorsports engineering scholarship. During the program he spent his summers working with race teams such as Tri-Star Motorsports.

== NASCAR career ==
=== Early career ===
Erwin was offered his first NASCAR job with Diamond Ridge Motorsports in 1995. He worked as an engineer for the team that employed drivers such as Steve Grissom, Jeff Green and Elliott Sadler. Erwin left Diamond Ridge at the end of 1995 to work for Team SABCO Racing. The operation grew quickly in the next few months going from one team to three. Erwin worked as the only engineer for all three cars. Chip Ganassi bought into the race team in 2001 hiring additional engineers. Through the end of 2002, Erwin remained at Chip Ganassi Racing with Felix Sabates.

Erwin began working for Richard Childress Racing in 2003 helping with their new seven-post research and development program. Erwin worked directly with the No. 31 team and crew chief Chris Andrews. At the end of 2004, early in 2005, Erwin left Richard Childress Racing for Robby Gordon Motorsports.

Erwin's first crew chief position was for the Robby Gordon Motorsports No. 7 Nextel Cup entry. Before Erwin joined in 2005, the team failed to qualify for four races but only missed two the rest of the season under his direction. The team started outside the top 35 in points and had to race their way in to the first few races in 2006. In its second year the team did not miss a race in 2006.

=== Roush ===
Roush Fenway Racing hired Erwin as the crew chief for the No. 16 Nextel Cup car driven by Greg Biffle in May 2007. On June 3, Erwin's first race with Biffle was at Dover International Speedway. Biffle started in the 10th position and finished sixth, his best finish in seven races. In September, his team went on to win at Kansas Speedway and finish 14th in the Nextel Cup point standings.

Erwin and Biffle recorded two wins, twelve top-five finishes and 17 top 10 finishes, in 2009, their first full season together. The team made the Chase for the second time in Biffle's career finishing the season third in the point standings.

Biffle made the NASCAR Chase for the Sprint Cup in 2009 and recorded Ford's first win of 2010 at Pocono Raceway.

=== Penske ===
In 2013, Erwin served as crew chief for Sam Hornish Jr. in the Nationwide Series. In 2014, he became the competition director for Team Penske in the Nationwide Series. Erwin served as interim crew chief for Sprint Cup driver Brad Keselowski at the 2014 The Profit on CNBC 500 after regular crew chief Paul Wolfe was witnessing the birth of his child. In 2015, Erwin became the crew chief for Team Penske's No. 22 car in the Xfinity Series. Erwin became the team manager for Team Penske's Xfinity Series program in 2016, with Brian Wilson replacing him as crew chief of the No. 22 car.

=== Wood Brothers ===
In 2018, Erwin became the crew chief for Wood Brothers Racing driver Paul Menard in the Monster Energy NASCAR Cup Series.

In April 2021, Erwin missed the Blue-Emu Maximum Pain Relief 500 at Martinsville Speedway due to COVID-19 protocols, and was replaced by Jonathan Hassler. Hassler became WBR's permanent crew chief on June 8, 2021.

== Personal life ==
Erwin is married to wife Susan and they have three children; Curtis, Kimberly and Colin. The family lives in Mooresville, North Carolina.
