= ARCA races at Charlotte =

ARCA Menards Series races at Charlotte Motor Speedway

ARCA Menards Series at Charlotte

ARCA Menards Series
- Venue: Charlotte Motor Speedway
- Location: Concord, North Carolina, United States

Circuit information
- Surface: Asphalt
- Length: 1.5 mi (2.4 km)
- Turns: 4

Stock car racing events in the ARCA Menards Series were held at Charlotte Motor Speedway, in Concord, North Carolina during numerous seasons and times of year since 1996.

== General Tire 150 ==
General Tire 150

ARCA Menards Series
- Venue: Charlotte Motor Speedway
- Location: Concord, North Carolina
- Corporate sponsor: General Tire
- First race: 1996
- Last race: 2025
- Distance: 150.0 mi (241.4 km)
- Laps: 100
- Previous names: ADG EasyCare 100 (1996); ADG Easy Care Certified 100 (1997); EasyCare Vehicle Service Contracts 100 (1998-2002); ADG 100 presented by EasyCare (2003); Quaker Steak & Lube 100 (2004)
- Most wins (driver): Frank Kimmel (3)
- Most wins (team): Clement Racing (3)
- Most wins (manufacturer): Ford (6)

Circuit information
- Length: 1.5 mi (2.4 km)
- Turns: 4

The General Tire 150 was a 150-mile (240 km) annual ARCA Menards Series race held at Charlotte Motor Speedway in Concord, North Carolina. The inaugural event was held on May 18, 1996, and was won by Tim Steele. The race was originally held during the month of May between 1996 and 2004, after which it was removed from the calendar. The race returned to the series in 2018 and remained until 2026 when it was removed from the calendar.

=== Past winners ===
Year	Date	No.	Driver	Team	Manufacturer	Race Distance		Race Time	Average Speed (mph)	Report
Year	Date	No.	Driver	Team	Manufacturer	Laps	Miles (km)	Race Time	Average Speed (mph)	Report
1996	May 18	16	Tim Steele	Steele Racing	Ford	67	100.5 (161.739)	0:54:19	111.016	Report
1997	May 17	66	Mark Thompson	Mike Brandt	Ford	67	100.5 (161.739)	0:48:50	123.481	Report
1998	May 16	46	Frank Kimmel	Clement Racing	Chevrolet	67	100.5 (161.739)	0:53:36	112.500	Report
1999	May 22	58	Mario Gosselin	Wings Racing	Chevrolet	63*	94.5 (152.083)	0:56:21	100.621	Report
2000	May 20	99	Lyndon Amick	Ken Schrader Racing	Pontiac	67	100.5 (161.739)	0:54:01	111.632	Report
2001	May 19	46	Frank Kimmel	Clement Racing	Ford	67	100.5 (161.739)	0:55:56	107.807	Report
2002	May 18	55	Jeff Fultz	Craig Motorsports	Ford	67	100.5 (161.739)	1:04:48	93.056	Report
2003	May 23	46	Frank Kimmel	Clement Racing	Ford	67	100.5 (161.739)	1:00:16	100.055	Report
2004	May 27	64	Ryan Hemphill	Braun Racing	Dodge	73*	109.5 (176.223)	1:12:45	90.309	Report
2005 – 2017	Not held									
2018	May 24	12	Brandon Jones	MDM Motorsports	Toyota	100	150 (241.402)	1:22:51	108.630	Report
2019	May 23	22	Ty Majeski	Chad Bryant Racing	Ford	109	163.5 (263.128)	1:29:39	109.426	Report
2020*	Not held									
2021	May 29	18	Ty Gibbs	Joe Gibbs Racing	Toyota	100	150 (241.402)	1:19:55	113.134	Report
2022	May 27	81	Brandon Jones	Joe Gibbs Racing	Toyota	100	150 (241.402)	1:29:52	100.148	Report
2023	May 26	20	Jesse Love	Venturini Motorsports	Toyota	103*	154.5 (248.64)	1:29:18	103.807	Report
2024	May 24	18	Tanner Gray	Joe Gibbs Racing	Toyota	100	150 (241.402)	1:27:2	103.409	Report
2025	May 23	82	Austin Green	Pinnacle Racing Group	Chevrolet	100	150 (241.402)	1:21:57	109.823	Report

- 1999: Race shortened due to time constraints.
- 2004, 2019 & 2023: Race lengthened for green-white-checkered finish.
- 2020: Race cancelled and moved to Kentucky due to the COVID-19 pandemic.

=== Multiple winners (drivers) ===
# Wins	Team	Years won
3	Frank Kimmel	1998, 2001, 2003
2	Brandon Jones	2018, 2022

=== Multiple winners (teams) ===
# Wins	Team	Years won
3	Clement Racing	1998, 2001, 2003
3	Joe Gibbs Racing	2021, 2022, 2024

=== Manufacturer wins ===
# Wins	Manufacturer	Years won
6	Ford	1996, 1997, 2001–2003, 2019
5	Toyota	2018, 2021–2024
3	Chevrolet	1998, 1999, 2025
1	Pontiac	2000
1	Dodge	2004

== EasyCare Certified 200 ==
EasyCare Certified 200
ARCA Menards Series
- Venue: Charlotte Motor Speedway
- Location: Concord, North Carolina
- Corporate sponsor: EasyCare
- First race: 1996
- Last race: 1997
- Distance: 201 mi (323 km)
- Laps: 134
- Previous names: ADG EasyCare 400K (1996)
- Most wins (driver): Tim Steele; Gary Laton (1)
- Most wins (team): Steele Racing; Thomas Laton (1)
- Most wins (manufacturer): Ford; Chevrolet (1)

Circuit information
- Length: 1.5 mi (2.4 km)
- Turns: 4

The EasyCare Certified 200 was an ARCA Menards Series race run in May 1996 and 1997. The race was dropped from the schedule for the 1998 season.

=== Past winners ===
Year	Date	No.	Driver	Team	Manufacturer	Race Distance		Race Time	Average Speed (mph)	Report
Year	Date	No.	Driver	Team	Manufacturer	Laps	Miles (km)	Race Time	Average Speed (mph)	Report
1996	May 22	16	Tim Steele	Steele Racing	Ford	166	249 (400.727)	1:48:20	138.730	Report
1997	May 21	74	Gary Laton	Thomas Laton	Chevrolet	134	201 (323.478)	1:58:47	101.529	Report

== EasyCare Vehicle Service Contracts 150 ==
EasyCare Vehicle Service Contracts 150
ARCA Menards Series
- Venue: Charlotte Motor Speedway
- Location: Concord, North Carolina
- Corporate sponsor: EasyCare
- First race: 1996
- Last race: 2003
- Distance: 150 mi (240 km)
- Laps: 100
- Previous names: First Plus 200 (1996); EasyCare Certified 200 (1997); EasyCare Certified 150 (1998); EasyCare Certified 100 (1999); EasyCare Vehicle Service Contracts 100 (2000-2002)
- Most wins (driver): Tim Steele; Kirk Shelmerdine (2)
- Most wins (team): Steele Racing (2)
- Most wins (manufacturer): Ford (4)

Circuit information
- Length: 1.5 mi (2.4 km)
- Turns: 4

The EasyCare Vehicle Service Contracts 150 was an ARCA Menards Series race run between 1996 and 2003 sometime around October 1. The race was removed following the 2003 season.

Tim Steele and Kirk Shelmerdine tied for the most wins at two apiece. In the 2001 event, driver Blaise Alexander was killed in a crash on lap 63.

=== Past winners ===
Year	Date	No.	Driver	Team	Manufacturer	Race Distance		Race Time	Average Speed (mph)	Report
Year	Date	No.	Driver	Team	Manufacturer	Laps	Miles (km)	Race Time	Average Speed (mph)	Report
1996	October 2	16	Tim Steele	Steele Racing	Ford	134	201 (323.478)	2:06:57	94.998	Report
1997	October 1	16	Tim Steele	Steele Racing	Ford	134	201 (323.478)	1:51:06	108.551	Report
1998	September 30	45	Adam Petty	Petty Enterprises	Pontiac	67	100.5 (161.739)	0:52:12	115.517	Report
1999	October 6	3	Kirk Shelmerdine	Kenneth Appling Racing	Chevrolet	67	100.5 (161.739)	0:56:02	107.678	Report
2000	October 4	27	Ryan Newman	Team Penske	Ford	67	100.5 (161.739)	0:59:47	100.864	Report
2001	October 4	2	Kerry Earnhardt	Dale Earnhardt, Inc.	Chevrolet	63*	94.5 (152.083)	0:45:55	123.485	Report
2002	October 11	77	Chad Blount	Braun Racing	Dodge	67	100.5 (161.739)	0:55:57	107.775	Report
2003	October 11	48	Kirk Shelmerdine	Kirk Shelmerdine Racing/Hylton Motorsports	Ford	66*	99.0 (159.325)	1:21:52	121.022	Report

- 2001: Race shortened to 63 laps due to fatal crash.
- 2003: Race shortened to 66 laps due to rain.

=== Multiple winners (drivers) ===
# Wins	Team	Years won
2	Tim Steele	1996, 1997
2	Kirk Shelmerdine	1999, 2003

=== Multiple winners (teams) ===
# Wins	Team	Years won
3	Steele Racing	1996, 1997

=== Manufacturer wins ===
# Wins	Manufacturer	Years won
4	Ford	1996, 1997, 2000, 2003
2	Chevrolet	1999, 2001
1	Pontiac	1998
1	Dodge	2002

Previous race: Tide 150	ARCA Menards Series; General Tire 150	Next race: Henry Ford Health 200
