= 2016 Menards 250 =

Thirteenth race of the 2016 NASCAR Xfinity Series

2016 Menards 250 presented by Valvoline
Race details
- Race 13 of 33 in the 2016 NASCAR Xfinity Series
- Date: June 11, 2016
- Official name: 25th Annual Menards 250 presented bt Valvolina
- Location: Michigan International Speedway, Brooklyn, Michigan
- Course: Permanent racing facility
- Course length: 2 miles (3.2 km)
- Distance: 125 laps, 250 mi (402 km)
- Scheduled distance: 125 laps, 250 mi (402 km)
- Average speed: 155.952 mph (250.980 km/h)

Pole position
Driver	Alex Bowman	JR Motorsports
- Time: 37.581

Most laps led
Driver	Kyle Busch	Joe Gibbs Racing
- Laps: 88

Winner
No. 19	Daniel Suárez	Joe Gibbs Racing

Television in the United States
- Network: FS1
- Announcers: Adam Alexander, Michael Waltrip, and Dale Earnhardt Jr.

Radio in the United States
- Radio: MRN

The 2016 Menards 250 presented by Valvoline was the thirteenth stock car race of the 2016 NASCAR Xfinity Series season, and the 25th iteration of the event. The race was held on Saturday, June 11, 2016, in Brooklyn, Michigan, at Michigan International Speedway, a 2 miles (3.2 km) permanent tri-oval shaped superspeedway. The race took the scheduled 125 laps to complete. In an exciting battle for the win, Daniel Suárez, driving for Joe Gibbs Racing, would make a last lap pass on Kyle Busch, and earn his first career NASCAR Xfinity Series win. He would become the first Mexican driver to win a NASCAR national series race. Busch mainly dominated the race, leading 88 laps. To fill out the podium, Paul Menard, driving for Richard Childress Racing, would finish in third, respectively.

== Background ==
The layout of Michigan International Speedway, the circuit where the race was held.

Michigan International Speedway is a 2 mi (3.2 km) moderate-banked D-shaped speedway located off U.S. Highway 12 on more than 1,400 acres (5.7 km^{2}) approximately four-mile (6.4 km) south of the village of Brooklyn, in the scenic Irish Hills area of southeastern Michigan. The track is 70-mile (110 km) west of the center of Detroit, 40-mile (64 km) from Ann Arbor and 60 miles (97 km) south and northwest of Lansing and Toledo, Ohio respectively. The track is used primarily for NASCAR events. It is sometimes known as a sister track to Texas World Speedway, and was used as the basis of Auto Club Speedway. The track is owned by NASCAR. Michigan International Speedway is recognized as one of the motorsports' premier facilities because of its wide racing surface and high banking (by open-wheel standards; the 18-degree banking is modest by stock car standards). Michigan is the fastest track in NASCAR due to its wide, sweeping corners, long straightaways, and lack of a restrictor plate requirement; typical qualifying speeds are in excess of 200 mph (320 km/h) and corner entry speeds are anywhere from 215 to 220 mph (346 to 354 km/h) after the 2012 repaving of the track.

=== Entry list ===
- (R) denotes rookie driver.
- (i) denotes driver who is ineligible for series driver points.

#	Driver	Team	Make	Sponsor
0	Garrett Smithley (R)	JD Motorsports	Chevrolet	Operating Engineers 324
01	Ryan Preece (R)	JD Motorsports	Chevrolet	JD Motorsports
1	Elliott Sadler	JR Motorsports	Chevrolet	OneMain Financial
2	Paul Menard (i)	Richard Childress Racing	Chevrolet	Richmond Water Heaters, Menards
3	Ty Dillon	Richard Childress Racing	Chevrolet	Rheem
4	Ross Chastain	JD Motorsports	Chevrolet	Dream Water
6	Bubba Wallace	Roush Fenway Racing	Ford	LoudMouth Exhaust
07	Ray Black Jr. (R)	SS-Green Light Racing	Chevrolet	Scuba Life
7	Justin Allgaier	JR Motorsports	Chevrolet	Brandt
10	Matt DiBenedetto (i)	TriStar Motorsports	Toyota	TriStar Motorsports
11	Blake Koch	Kaulig Racing	Chevrolet	LeafFilter Gutter Protection
13	Harrison Rhodes	MBM Motorsports	Dodge	OCR Gaz Bar, Mohawk Market
14	Jeff Green	TriStar Motorsports	Toyota	TriStar Motorsports
15	Todd Peck	B. J. McLeod Motorsports	Ford	Lilly Trucking, Carport Empire
16	Ryan Reed	Roush Fenway Racing	Ford	Lilly Diabetes, American Diabetes Association
18	Kyle Busch (i)	Joe Gibbs Racing	Toyota	NOS Energy Drink
19	Daniel Suárez	Joe Gibbs Racing	Toyota	Arris
20	Erik Jones (R)	Joe Gibbs Racing	Toyota	Reser's Fine Foods
22	Joey Logano (i)	Team Penske	Ford	Discount Tire
25	Chris Cockrum	Chris Cockrum Racing	Chevrolet	Advanced Communications Group
28	Dakoda Armstrong	JGL Racing	Toyota	WinField
33	Brandon Jones (R)	Richard Childress Racing	Chevrolet	Nexteer Automotive
39	Ryan Sieg	RSS Racing	Chevrolet	iDashBoards
40	John Jackson	MBM Motorsports	Toyota	TLC Vacations
42	Justin Marks	Chip Ganassi Racing	Chevrolet	Katerra
44	J. J. Yeley	TriStar Motorsports	Toyota	Zachry
48	Brennan Poole (R)	Chip Ganassi Racing	Chevrolet	DC Solar
51	Jeremy Clements	Jeremy Clements Racing	Chevrolet	RepairableVehicles.com, Diamond Pistons
52	Joey Gase	Jimmy Means Racing	Chevrolet	Donate Life, DB Sales
62	Brendan Gaughan	Richard Childress Racing	Chevrolet	South Point Hotel, Casino & Spa
70	Derrike Cope	Derrike Cope Racing	Chevrolet	Big Brothers Big Sisters of America
74	Mike Harmon	Mike Harmon Racing	Dodge	Mike Harmon Racing
78	B. J. McLeod (R)	B. J. McLeod Motorsports	Ford	B. J. McLeod Motorsports
79	Josh Williams	Jimmy Means Racing	Chevrolet	DB Sales
88	Alex Bowman	JR Motorsports	Chevrolet	Vannoy Construction
89	Morgan Shepherd	Shepherd Racing Ventures	Chevrolet	Shepherd Racing Ventures
90	Martin Roy	DGM Racing	Chevrolet	Gamache Truck Center
92	Mario Gosselin	DGM Racing	Chevrolet	BuckedUp Apparel
93	Josh Wise (i)	RSS Racing	Chevrolet	RSS Racing
97	T. J. Bell	Obaika Racing	Chevrolet	Vroom! Brands
Official entry list

== Practice ==
=== First practice ===
The first practice session was held on Friday, June 10, at 12:30 PM EST. The session would last for 55 minutes. Erik Jones, driving for Joe Gibbs Racing, would set the fastest time in the session, with a lap of 37.482, and an average speed of 192.092 mph (309.142 km/h).

Pos.	#	Driver	Team	Make	Time	Speed
1	20	Erik Jones (R)	Joe Gibbs Racing	Toyota	37.482	192.092
2	3	Ty Dillon	Richard Childress Racing	Chevrolet	37.523	191.882
3	22	Joey Logano (i)	Team Penske	Ford	37.556	191.714
Full first practice results

=== Final practice ===
The final practice session was held on Friday, June 10, at 3:00 PM EST. The session would last for 55 minutes. Joey Logano, driving for Team Penske, would set the fastest time in the session, with a lap of 37.534, and an average speed of 191.826 mph (308.714 km/h).

Pos.	#	Driver	Team	Make	Time	Speed
1	22	Joey Logano (i)	Team Penske	Ford	37.534	191.826
2	11	Blake Koch	Kaulig Racing	Chevrolet	37.595	191.515
3	16	Ryan Reed	Roush Fenway Racing	Ford	37.614	191.418
Full final practice results

== Qualifying ==
Qualifying was held on Saturday, June 11, at 10:00 AM EST. Since Michigan International Speedway is at least 2 miles (3.2 km), the qualifying system was a single car, single lap, two round system where in the first round, everyone would set a time to determine positions 13–40. Then, the fastest 12 qualifiers would move on to the second round to determine positions 1–12.

Alex Bowman, driving for JR Motorsports, would win the pole after advancing from the preliminary round and setting the fastest lap in Round 2, with a lap of 37.581, and an average speed of 191.586 mph (308.328 km/h).

=== Full qualifying results ===
Pos.	#	Driver	Team	Make	Time (R1)	Speed (R1)	Time (R2)	Speed (R2)
1	88	Alex Bowman	JR Motorsports	Chevrolet	37.535	191.821	37.581	191.586
2	20	Erik Jones (R)	Joe Gibbs Racing	Toyota	37.640	191.286	37.591	191.535
3	1	Elliott Sadler	JR Motorsports	Chevrolet	37.687	191.047	37.629	191.342
4	7	Justin Allgaier	JR Motorsports	Chevrolet	37.793	190.511	37.655	191.210
5	18	Kyle Busch (i)	Joe Gibbs Racing	Toyota	37.762	190.668	37.740	190.779
6	19	Daniel Suárez	Joe Gibbs Racing	Toyota	37.871	190.119	37.750	190.728
7	11	Blake Koch	Kaulig Racing	Chevrolet	37.765	190.653	37.765	190.653
8	48	Brennan Poole (R)	Chip Ganassi Racing	Chevrolet	37.821	190.370	37.784	190.557
9	22	Joey Logano (i)	Team Penske	Ford	37.781	190.572	37.827	190.340
10	39	Ryan Sieg	RSS Racing	Chevrolet	37.822	190.365	37.830	190.325
11	16	Ryan Reed	Roush Fenway Racing	Ford	37.766	190.648	37.840	190.275
12	2	Paul Menard (i)	Richard Childress Racing	Chevrolet	37.883	190.059	38.009	189.429
Eliminated in Round 1
13	3	Ty Dillon	Richard Childress Racing	Chevrolet	37.974	189.603	-	-
14	62	Brendan Gaughan	Richard Childress Racing	Chevrolet	37.994	189.504	-	-
15	33	Brandon Jones (R)	Richard Childress Racing	Chevrolet	38.009	189.429	-	-
16	42	Justin Marks	Chip Ganassi Racing	Chevrolet	38.083	189.061	-	-
17	6	Bubba Wallace	Roush Fenway Racing	Ford	38.088	189.036	-	-
18	4	Ross Chastain	JD Motorsports	Chevrolet	38.113	188.912	-	-
19	28	Dakoda Armstrong	JGL Racing	Toyota	38.210	188.432	-	-
20	0	Garrett Smithley (R)	JD Motorsports	Chevrolet	38.218	188.393	-	-
21	44	J. J. Yeley	TriStar Motorsports	Toyota	38.306	187.960	-	-
22	51	Jeremy Clements	Jeremy Clements Racing	Chevrolet	38.365	187.671	-	-
23	14	Jeff Green	TriStar Motorsports	Toyota	38.573	186.659	-	-
24	01	Ryan Preece (R)	JD Motorsports	Chevrolet	38.617	186.446	-	-
25	10	Matt DiBenedetto (i)	TriStar Motorsports	Toyota	38.717	185.965	-	-
26	07	Ray Black Jr. (R)	SS-Green Light Racing	Chevrolet	38.766	185.730	-	-
27	93	Josh Wise (i)	RSS Racing	Chevrolet	38.955	184.829	-	-
28	78	B. J. McLeod (R)	B. J. McLeod Motorsports	Ford	39.004	184.596	-	-
29	52	Joey Gase	Jimmy Means Racing	Chevrolet	39.294	183.234	-	-
30	13	Harrison Rhodes	MBM Motorsports	Dodge	39.347	182.987	-	-
31	97	T. J. Bell	Obaika Racing	Chevrolet	39.521	182.182	-	-
32	70	Derrike Cope	Derrike Cope Racing	Chevrolet	39.769	181.046	-	-
33	92	Mario Gosselin	DGM Racing	Chevrolet	39.832	180.759	-	-
Qualified by owner's points
34	89	Morgan Shepherd	Shepherd Racing Ventures	Chevrolet	40.115	179.484	-	-
35	25	Chris Cockrum	Chris Cockrum Racing	Chevrolet	40.345	178.461	-	-
36	74	Mike Harmon	Mike Harmon Racing	Dodge	40.996	175.627	-	-
37	90	Martin Roy	DGM Racing	Chevrolet	41.073	175.298	-	-
38	15	Todd Peck	B. J. McLeod Motorsports	Ford	41.212	174.706	-	-
39	40	John Jackson	MBM Motorsports	Toyota	42.215	170.555	-	-
40	79	Josh Williams	Jimmy Means Racing	Chevrolet	42.268	170.342	-	-
Official qualifying results
Official starting lineup

== Race results ==
Fin	St	#	Driver	Team	Make	Laps	Led	Status	Pts
1	6	19	Daniel Suárez	Joe Gibbs Racing	Toyota	125	4	Running	44
2	5	18	Kyle Busch (i)	Joe Gibbs Racing	Toyota	125	88	Running	0
3	12	2	Paul Menard (i)	Richard Childress Racing	Chevrolet	125	1	Running	0
4	2	20	Erik Jones (R)	Joe Gibbs Racing	Toyota	125	18	Running	38
5	3	1	Elliott Sadler	JR Motorsports	Chevrolet	125	2	Running	37
6	9	22	Joey Logano (i)	Team Penske	Ford	125	0	Running	0
7	1	88	Alex Bowman	JR Motorsports	Chevrolet	125	11	Running	35
8	4	7	Justin Allgaier	JR Motorsports	Chevrolet	125	0	Running	33
9	17	6	Bubba Wallace	Roush Fenway Racing	Ford	125	0	Running	32
10	15	33	Brandon Jones (R)	Richard Childress Racing	Chevrolet	125	0	Running	31
11	8	48	Brennan Poole (R)	Chip Ganassi Racing	Chevrolet	125	0	Running	30
12	10	39	Ryan Sieg	RSS Racing	Chevrolet	125	0	Running	29
13	7	11	Blake Koch	Kaulig Racing	Chevrolet	125	0	Running	28
14	11	16	Ryan Reed	Roush Fenway Racing	Ford	125	0	Running	27
15	13	3	Ty Dillon	Richard Childress Racing	Chevrolet	125	0	Running	26
16	18	4	Ross Chastain	JD Motorsports	Chevrolet	125	0	Running	25
17	20	0	Garrett Smithley (R)	JD Motorsports	Chevrolet	125	0	Running	24
18	14	62	Brendan Gaughan	Richard Childress Racing	Chevrolet	125	0	Running	23
19	24	01	Ryan Preece (R)	JD Motorsports	Chevrolet	125	0	Running	22
20	21	44	J. J. Yeley	TriStar Motorsports	Toyota	124	1	Running	22
21	22	51	Jeremy Clements	Jeremy Clements Racing	Chevrolet	124	0	Running	20
22	16	42	Justin Marks	Chip Ganassi Racing	Chevrolet	124	0	Running	19
23	26	07	Ray Black Jr. (R)	SS-Green Light Racing	Chevrolet	123	0	Running	18
24	19	28	Dakoda Armstrong	JGL Racing	Toyota	122	0	Running	17
25	29	52	Joey Gase	Jimmy Means Racing	Chevrolet	121	0	Running	16
26	30	13	Harrison Rhodes	MBM Motorsports	Dodge	120	0	Running	15
27	37	90	Martin Roy	DGM Racing	Chevrolet	118	0	Running	14
28	31	97	T. J. Bell	Obaika Racing	Chevrolet	117	0	Running	13
29	36	74	Mike Harmon	Mike Harmon Racing	Dodge	116	0	Running	12
30	38	15	Todd Peck	B. J. McLeod Motorsports	Ford	116	0	Running	11
31	32	70	Derrike Cope	Derrike Cope Racing	Chevrolet	115	0	Running	10
32	35	25	Chris Cockrum	Chris Cockrum Racing	Chevrolet	82	0	Accident	9
33	23	14	Jeff Green	TriStar Motorsports	Toyota	75	0	Transmission	8
34	28	78	B. J. McLeod (R)	B. J. McLeod Motorsports	Ford	70	0	Transmission	7
35	33	92	Mario Gosselin	DGM Racing	Chevrolet	41	0	Vibration	6
36	34	89	Morgan Shepherd	Shepherd Racing Ventures	Chevrolet	16	0	Oil Leak	5
37	39	40	John Jackson	MBM Motorsports	Toyota	13	0	Clutch	4
38	40	79	Josh Williams	Jimmy Means Racing	Chevrolet	11	0	Overheating	3
39	27	93	Josh Wise (i)	RSS Racing	Chevrolet	8	0	Rear Gear	0
40	25	10	Matt DiBenedetto (i)	TriStar Motorsports	Toyota	3	0	Rear Gear	0
Official race results

== Standings after the race ==
Drivers' Championship standings
	Pos	Driver	Points
	1	Daniel Suárez	452
	2	Elliott Sadler	434 (-18)
	3	Ty Dillon	416 (-36)
1	4	Erik Jones	397 (-55)
2	5	Justin Allgaier	388 (-64)
	6	Brandon Jones	388 (-64)
3	7	Brendan Gaughan	386 (-66)
	8	Brennan Poole	373 (-79)
	9	Bubba Wallace	340 (-112)
	10	Ryan Reed	301 (-151)
	11	Blake Koch	294 (-158)
	12	Ryan Sieg	292 (-160)
Official driver's standings

- Note: Only the first 12 positions are included for the driver standings.

Previous race: 2016 Pocono Green 250	NASCAR Xfinity Series; 2016 season	Next race: 2016 American Ethanol E15 250
