= Mario Gosselin (racing driver) =

Canadian racing driver (born 1971)

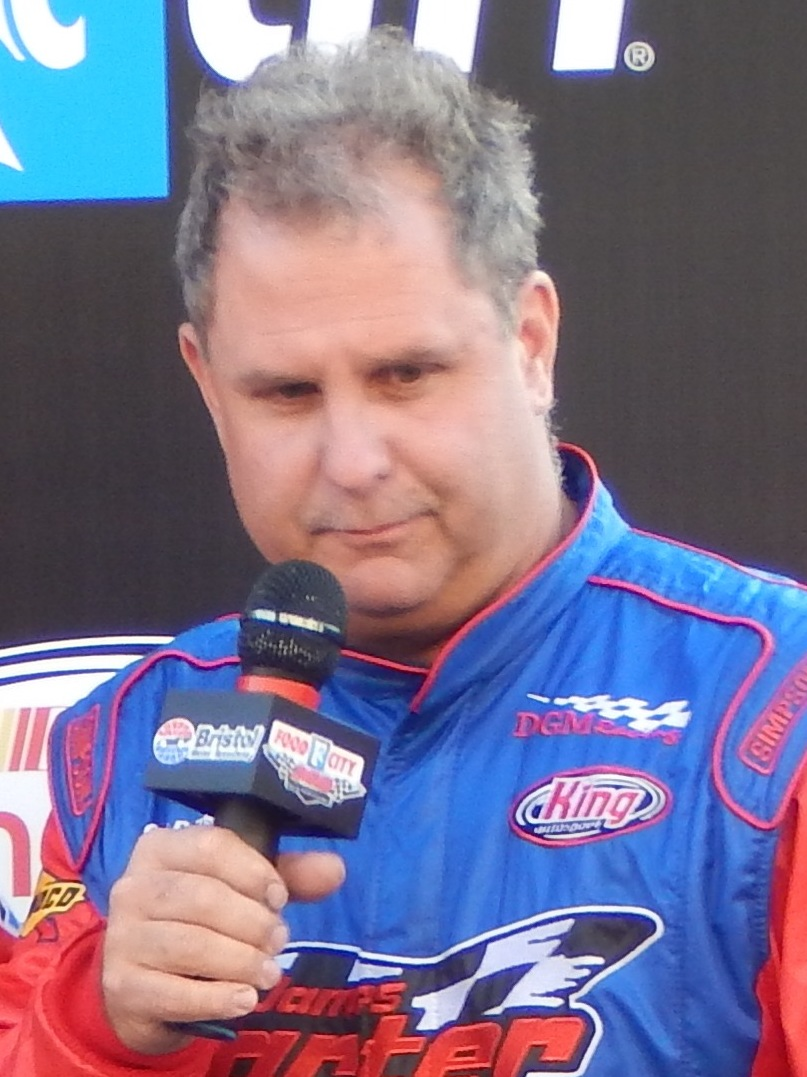
- Gosselin at Bristol Motor Speedway in 2015
- Born: October 20, 1971 (age 55); Sainte-Marie, Quebec, Canada
- Achievements: 1997 Hooters Pro Cup Series Champion

NASCAR Cup Series career
- 2 races run over 1 year
- Best finish: 80th (2004)
- First race: 2004 Subway 500 (Martinsville)
- Last race: 2004 Southern 500 (Darlington)
Wins	Top tens	Poles
0	0	0

NASCAR O'Reilly Auto Parts Series career
- 43 races run over 5 years
- 2021 position: 110th
- Best finish: 26th (2016)
- First race: 1998 Myrtle Beach 250 (Myrtle Beach
- Last race: 2017 Ticket Galaxy 200 (Phoenix)
Wins	Top tens	Poles
0	0	0

NASCAR FedEx Freight Truck Series career
- 47 races run over 4 years
- 2012 position: 66th
- Best finish: 16th (2010)
- First race: 2008 O'Reilly Auto Parts 250 (Kansas)
- Last race: 2012 Ford EcoBoost 200 (Homestead)
Wins	Top tens	Poles
0	2	0
- Statistics up to date as of December 28, 2021.

Mario Gosselin (born October 20, 1971) is a Canadian-American professional stock car racing driver, crew chief, and team owner. He owns DGM Racing, a team that competes in the NASCAR O'Reilly Auto Parts Series. In 2004, he became the second native of the Province of Quebec to start in a NASCAR Nextel Cup Series race after Superbike legend Yvon Duhamel. In 1997, he became the first Canadian to win the championship title for the NASCAR CARS Pro Cup Series.

== Racing career ==
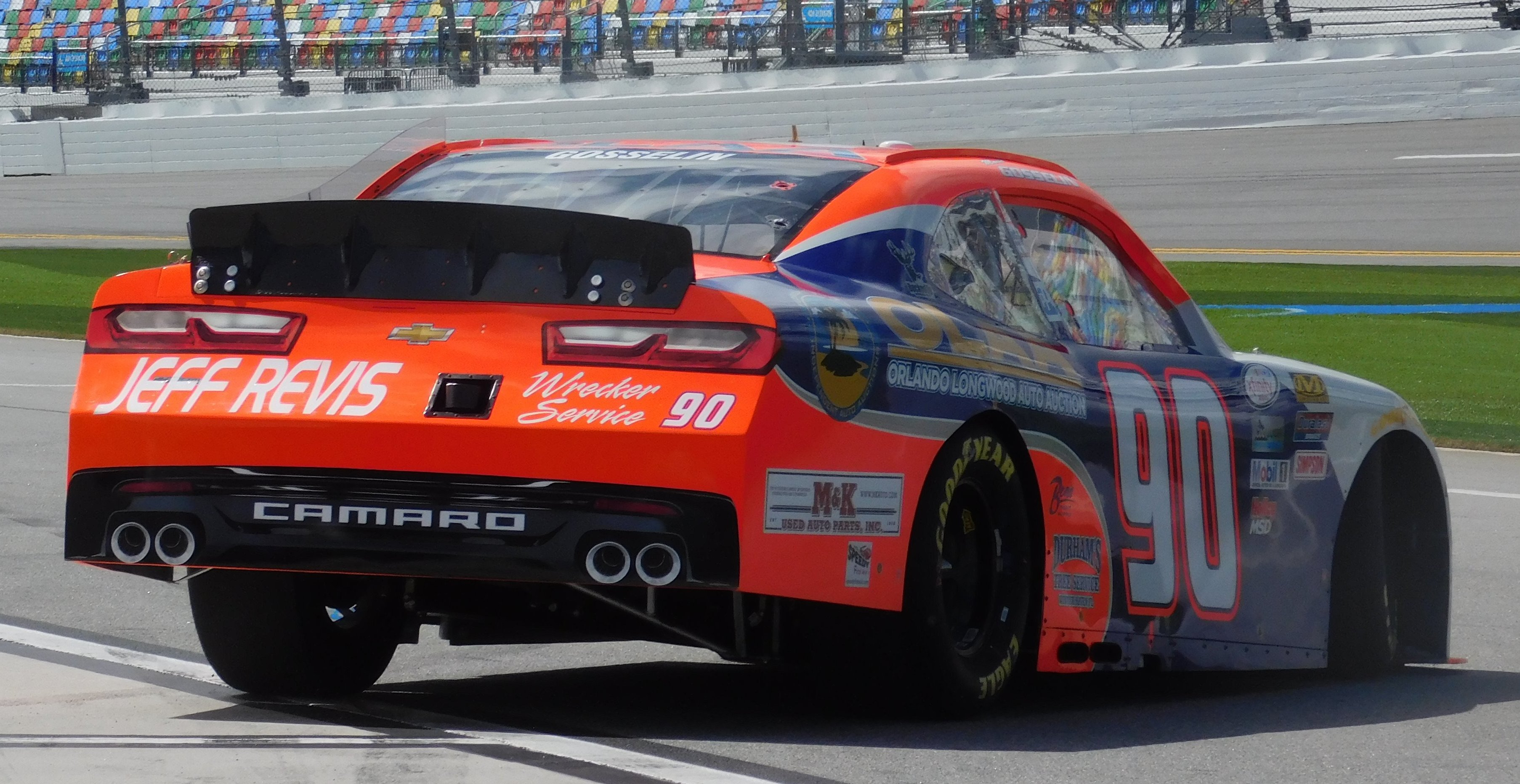
Gosselin's No. 90 car at Daytona International Speedway in 2017

Gosselin is a multiple-time winner in the ARCA Racing Series and two-time CARS Pro Cup Series champion. He began his racing career in 1990 at Hialeah, Florida, by winning the pure stock division championship.

Gosselin moved into late models the next year and has multiple championships and many wins to his credit at various speedways. In 1998, Gosselin made his NASCAR debut, at Myrtle Beach Speedway, in his No. 71 Chevrolet, finishing sixteenth. He also qualified on the pole and won his first ARCA RE/MAX Series start, in 1999. That first ARCA victory came at the Lowe's Motor Speedway in Charlotte, North Carolina He has since competed in several part-time ARCA schedules and has won another two races.

In 2004, Gosselin ran two races late in the Nextel Cup Series season in the No. 80 Hover Motorsports Ford, finishing 41st in both starts. He rejoined NASCAR competition in 2008 as the driver and crew chief of the No. 12 Crashedtoys.com Chevrolet Silverado, which was owned by his wife Michelle, in the Craftsman Truck Series. He and Scotty Crockett shared the driving duties of the truck and made six starts with the team. After the season, attorney James Carter became a sponsor and co-owner of the team, allowing Gosselin and his wife to open a second truck team. Gosselin made fifteen starts in 2009 and finished six of them. His best finish and first ever NASCAR top-ten came at Talladega Superspeedway in the fall where he ended up sixth in a wild race. Starting at Talladega, Gosselin picked up a sponsorship from TireMonkey.com. With a sponsorship in place, he ran the full 2010 season, but was forced to sell his owners' points to Johanna Long and her Panhandle Motorsports team for 2011. Gosselin took a new role as a crew chief for Truck Series driver Russ Dugger.

Gosselin returned to the Busch Series, now the Xfinity Series, in 2015, racing the No. 90 King Autosport Chevy at Daytona International Speedway. He continued racing sporadically until 2017, with his team later being renamed DGM Racing. In December 2020, Gosselin announced he would once again race in the series with DGM, driving the No. 91 in the 2021 season opener at Daytona.

== Personal life ==
Gosselin is a native of Sainte-Marie, Quebec. He lived there before moving with his family to Florida in 1981. He settled in Lake Wales, Florida, a few years ago.

== Motorsports career results ==
=== NASCAR ===
(key) (Bold – Pole position awarded by qualifying time. Italics – Pole position earned by points standings or practice time. * – Most laps led.)

==== Nextel Cup Series ====
NASCAR Nextel Cup Series results
Year	Team	No.	Make	1	2	3	4	5	6	7	8	9	10	11	12	13	14	15	16	17	18	19	20	21	22	23	24	25	26	27	28	29	30	31	32	33	34	35	36	NNCC	Pts	Ref
2004	Hover Motorsports	80	Ford	DAY	CAR	LVS	ATL	DAR	BRI	TEX	MAR	TAL	CAL	RCH	CLT	DOV	POC	MCH	SON	DAY	CHI	NHA	POC	IND	GLN	MCH	BRI	CAL	RCH	NHA	DOV	TAL	KAN	CLT	MAR; 41	ATL	PHO; DNQ	DAR; 41	HOM	80th	80	

==== Xfinity Series ====
NASCAR Xfinity Series results
Year	Team	No.	Make	1	2	3	4	5	6	7	8	9	10	11	12	13	14	15	16	17	18	19	20	21	22	23	24	25	26	27	28	29	30	31	32	33	NXSC	Pts	Ref
1998	Mario Gosselin	71	Chevy	DAY	CAR	LVS	NSV	DAR	BRI	TEX	HCY	TAL	NHA	NZH	CLT	DOV	RCH	PPR	GLN	MLW	MYB; 16	CAL	SBO	IRP	MCH	BRI	DAR	RCH; DNQ	DOV	CLT	GTY	CAR	ATL	HOM			96th	115	
1999	Wings Racing	58	Ford	DAY	CAR; DNQ	LVS	ATL	DAR	TEX	NSV	BRI	TAL	CAL	NHA	RCH	NZH	CLT	DOV	SBO	GLN		MYB; DNQ	PPR	GTY	IRP	MCH	BRI	DAR	RCH; DNQ	DOV	CLT	CAR	MEM	PHO	HOM		NA	-	
1999	Andy Petree Racing	15	Chevy																		MLW; DNQ																NA	-	
2000	Wings Racing	58	Chevy	DAY	CAR	LVS	ATL	DAR	BRI	TEX	NSV	TAL	CAL	RCH	NHA	CLT	DOV	SBO	MYB; 35	GLN	MLW; DNQ	NZH	PPR	GTY; 42	IRP	MCH	BRI	DAR	RCH	DOV	CLT	CAR	MEM	PHO	HOM		97th	95	
2015	King Autosport	90	Chevy	DAY; 15	ATL	LVS; 32	PHO; 38	CAL; 27	TEX; 28	BRI	RCH	TAL; 19	IOW	CLT	DOV; 32	MCH	CHI	DAY	KEN	NHA	IND	IOW	GLN	MOH	BRI; 35	ROA	DAR	RCH	CHI		DOV; 19	CLT			PHO; 28	HOM; 34	29th	182	
2015	King Autosport	92	Chevy																											KEN; DNQ			KAN; Wth	TEX; 39			29th	182	
2016	King Autosport	92	Chevy	DAY; DNQ												MCH; 35								MOH; 39													26th	257	
2016	King Autosport	90	Chevy		ATL; 25	LVS; 29	PHO; 35	CAL; 26	TEX	BRI; 24	RCH	TAL; 28	DOV; 28	CLT	POC; 20		IOW; 24	DAY; 33	KEN	NHA; 24	IND; 29	IOW; 25	GLN		BRI; 17	ROA	DAR; 26	RCH; 33	CHI	KEN	DOV; 23	CLT	KAN	TEX	PHO	HOM; 38	26th	257	
2017	King Autosport	90	Chevy	DAY; 17	ATL	LVS	PHO; 28	CAL	TEX	BRI	RCH	TAL	CLT	DOV	POC	MCH	IOW	DAY	KEN	NHA	IND; 27	IOW	GLN	MOH	BRI	ROA	DAR	RCH	CHI; 31	KEN	DOV	CLT; 24	KAN; 29	TEX; 28	PHO; 26	HOM	40th	90	
2021	DGM Racing	91	Chevy	DAY; DNQ	DAY	HOM	LVS	PHO	ATL	MAR	TAL	DAR	DOV	COA	CLT	MOH	TEX	NSH	POC	ROA	ATL	NHA	GLN	IND	MCH	DAY	DAR	RCH	BRI	LVS	TAL	CLT	TEX	KAN	MAR	PHO	110th	-	

==== Camping World Truck Series ====
NASCAR Camping World Truck Series results
Year	Team	No.	Make	1	2	3	4	5	6	7	8	9	10	11	12	13	14	15	16	17	18	19	20	21	22	23	24	25	NCWTC	Pts	Ref
2008	DGM Racing	12	Chevy	DAY	CAL	ATL	MAR	KAN; 34	CLT	MFD	DOV	TEX	MCH; 29	MLW	MEM	KEN	IRP; 28	NSH	BRI	GTY	NHA; 27	LVS	TAL	MAR	ATL; 24	TEX	PHO	HOM; 24	47th	403	
2009	DGM Racing	12	Chevy	DAY; 29	CAL	ATL; 32	MAR	KAN	CLT; 17		TEX; 29	MCH; 31	MLW	MEM; 19	KEN; 27	IRP	NSH; 26	BRI	CHI; 32	IOW; 20	GTY; 32	NHA	LVS	MAR	TAL; 6	TEX; 21	PHO	HOM; 20	25th	1324	
2009	DGM Racing	72	Chevy							DOV; 36																			25th	1324	
2010	DGM Racing	12	Chevy	DAY; 23	ATL; 22	MAR; 9	NSH; 21	KAN; 17	DOV; 18	CLT; 20	TEX; 22	MCH; 23	IOW; 12	GTY; 14	IRP; 24	POC; 15	NSH; 26	DAR; 23	BRI; 18	CHI; 19	KEN; 16	NHA; 17	LVS; 19	MAR; 35	TAL; 34	TEX; 20	PHO; 34	HOM; 35	16th	2479	
2012	Glenden Enterprises	84	Chevy	DAY	MAR	CAR	KAN	CLT	DOV	TEX	KEN	IOW	CHI	POC	MCH	BRI	ATL	IOW	KEN	LVS	TAL	MAR	TEX	PHO	HOM; 21				66th	23	

^{*} Season still in progress
^{1} Ineligible for series points

=== ARCA Racing Series ===
(key) (Bold – Pole position awarded by qualifying time. Italics – Pole position earned by points standings or practice time. * – Most laps led.)

ARCA Racing Series results
Year	Team	No.	Make	1	2	3	4	5	6	7	8	9	10	11	12	13	14	15	16	17	18	19	20	21	22	23	ARSC	Pts	Ref
1999	Wings Racing	58	Chevy	DAY	ATL	SLM	AND	**CLT**; 1*	MCH	POC	TOL	SBS	BLN	POC	KIL	FRS	FLM	ISF	WIN	DSF	SLM	**CLT**; 3	TAL	ATL; DNQ			59th	480	
2000	Wings Racing	58	Chevy	DAY	SLM	AND	CLT	KIL	FRS	MCH	POC	TOL	KEN	BLN	POC	WIN	ISF	KEN	DSF	SLM	CLT; 6	TAL	ATL; 26				70th	300	
2002	Gosselin Racing	12	Chevy	DAY	ATL	NSH	SLM	KEN	CLT	KAN	POC	MCH	TOL	SBO	KEN	BLN	POC; 3	NSH	ISF	WIN	DSF	CHI	SLM	TAL	CLT		110th	220	
2003	Gosselin Racing	12	Chevy	DAY	ATL	NSH	SLM	TOL	KEN	CLT; DNQ	BLN	KAN	MCH	LER	POC; 23	POC; 36	NSH; 1*	ISF	WIN	DSF	CHI	SLM	TAL	CLT; 14	SBO		45th	630	
2004	Norm Benning Racing	8	Chevy	DAY	NSH	SLM	KEN	TOL	CLT; 36	KAN	POC	MCH	SBO	BLN	KEN	GTW	POC	LER									93rd	260	
2004	Gosselin Racing	12	Chevy																NSH; 4	ISF	TOL	DSF	CHI	SLM	TAL		93rd	260	
2005	Gosselin Racing	12	Chevy	DAY; 20	NSH; 3	SLM	KEN	TOL	LAN	MIL	POC; 23	MCH; 35	KAN	KEN	BLN	POC	GTW	LER	NSH	MCH; 10	ISF	TOL	DSF	CHI; 33	SLM	TAL	44th	760	
2006	DGM Racing	12	Chevy	DAY; 8	NSH; 18	SLM; 29	WIN; DNQ		TOL; 9	POC; 2*	MCH; 8	KAN; 22					NSH; 1	MCH	ISF	MIL	TOL	DSF	CHI; 28	SLM	TAL; 38	IOW; 30	24th	2215	
2006	Andy Belmont Motorsports	1	Ford					KEN; 39																			24th	2215	
2006	Gosselin Racing	63	Chevy										KEN; DNQ														24th	2215	
2006	Jeff McClure-Eddie Sharp	22	Dodge											BLN; DNQ	POC	GTW											24th	2215	
2007	DGM Racing	12	Chevy	DAY; 13	USA; 12	NSH; 36	SLM	KAN; 4	WIN	KEN	TOL	IOW	POC; 5	MCH	BLN	KEN	POC	NSH	ISF	MIL	GTW	DSF	CHI; 30	SLM	TAL; 12	TOL	34th	1060	
2008	Jack Bowsher & Associates	21	Chevy	DAY; 32	SLM	IOW	KAN	CAR	KEN	TOL	POC	MCH	CAY	KEN	BLN	POC	NSH	ISF	DSF	CHI	SLM	NJE	TAL	TOL			143rd	70	
2009	DGM Racing	12	Chevy	DAY; 34	SLM	CAR	TAL	KEN	TOL	POC	MCH	MFD	IOW	KEN	BLN	POC	ISF	CHI	TOL	DSF	NJE	SLM	KAN	CAR			152nd	60	
2014	Williams-Gosselin Racing	02	Chevy	DAY; 23	MOB	SLM	TAL	TOL	NJE	POC	MCH	ELK	WIN	CHI	IRP	POC	BLN	ISF	MAD	DSF	SLM	KEN	KAN				120th	115	

== See also ==
- List of Canadians in NASCAR

Sporting positions
Preceded by Inaugural	Hooters Pro Cup Series Champion; 1997	Succeeded by Jeff Agnew
