= 2016 Pocono Green 250 =

Tweltfh race of the 2016 NASCAR Xfinity Series

Race details
- Race 12 of 33 in the 2016 NASCAR Xfinity Series
- Date: June 4, 2016
- Official name: First Annual Pocono Green 250
- Location: Pocono Raceway, Long Pond, Pennsylvania
- Course: Permanent racing facility
- Course length: 2.5 miles (4.0 km)
- Distance: 53 laps, 132 mi (213 km)
- Scheduled distance: 100 laps, 250 mi (402 km)
- Average speed: 118.421 mph (190.580 km/h)

Pole position
Driver	Erik Jones	Joe Gibbs Racing
- Time: 51.158

Most laps led
Driver	Kyle Larson	Chip Ganassi Racing
- Laps: 27

Winner
No. 42	Kyle Larson	Chip Ganassi Racing

Television in the United States
- Network: Fox
- Announcers: Adam Alexander, Michael Waltrip, and Danica Patrick

Radio in the United States
- Radio: MRN

The 2016 Pocono Green 250 was the twelfth stock car race of the 2016 NASCAR Xfinity Series season, and the first iteration of the event. The race was held on Saturday, June 4, 2016, in Long Pond, Pennsylvania, at Pocono Raceway, a 2.5 miles (4.0 km) permanent triangular-shaped superspeedway. The race was decreased from 100 laps to 53 laps, due to inclement weather. Kyle Larson, driving for Chip Ganassi Racing, would take the win, after leading when the race got called due to persistent rain showers. This was Larson's 4th career NASCAR Xfinity Series win, and his first of the season. To fill out the podium, Erik Jones, driving for Joe Gibbs Racing, and Ty Dillon, driving for Richard Childress Racing, would finish second and third, respectively.

== Background ==
The layout of Pocono Raceway, the circuit where the race was held.

Pocono Raceway (formerly Pocono International Raceway), also known as The Tricky Triangle, is a superspeedway located in the Pocono Mountains in Long Pond, Pennsylvania. It is the site of three NASCAR national series races and an ARCA Menards Series event in July: a NASCAR Cup Series race with support events by the NASCAR Xfinity Series and NASCAR Camping World Truck Series. From 1971 to 1989, and from 2013 to 2019, the track also hosted an Indy Car race, currently sanctioned by the IndyCar Series. Additionally, from 1982 to 2021, it hosted two NASCAR Cup Series races, with the traditional first date being removed for 2022.

Pocono is one of the few NASCAR tracks not owned by either NASCAR or Speedway Motorsports, the dominant track owners in NASCAR. Pocono CEO Nick Igdalsky and president Ben May are members of the family-owned Mattco Inc, started by Joseph II and Rose Mattioli. Mattco also owns South Boston Speedway in South Boston, Virginia.

=== Entry list ===
- (R) denotes rookie driver.
- (i) denotes driver who is ineligible for series driver points.

#	Driver	Team	Make	Sponsor
0	Garrett Smithley (R)	JD Motorsports	Chevrolet	JD Motorsports
01	Ryan Preece (R)	JD Motorsports	Chevrolet	JD Motorsports
1	Elliott Sadler	JR Motorsports	Chevrolet	OneMain Financial
2	Paul Menard (i)	Richard Childress Racing	Chevrolet	Richmond Water Heaters, Menards
3	Ty Dillon	Richard Childress Racing	Chevrolet	Rheem
4	Ross Chastain	JD Motorsports	Chevrolet	Dream Water
6	Bubba Wallace	Roush Fenway Racing	Ford	LoudMouth Exhaust
07	Ray Black Jr. (R)	SS-Green Light Racing	Chevrolet	Scuba Life
7	Justin Allgaier	JR Motorsports	Chevrolet	Suave MEN
10	Matt DiBenedetto (i)	TriStar Motorsports	Toyota	TriStar Motorsports
11	Blake Koch	Kaulig Racing	Chevrolet	LeafFilter Gutter Protection
13	T. J. Bell	MBM Motorsports	Dodge	OCR Gaz Bar
14	Jeff Green	TriStar Motorsports	Toyota	TriStar Motorsports
15	Todd Peck	B. J. McLeod Motorsports	Ford	B. J. McLeod Motorsports
16	Ryan Reed	Roush Fenway Racing	Ford	Lilly Diabetes, American Diabetes Association
18	Kyle Busch (i)	Joe Gibbs Racing	Toyota	NOS Energy Drink
19	Daniel Suárez	Joe Gibbs Racing	Toyota	Arris
20	Erik Jones (R)	Joe Gibbs Racing	Toyota	Sport Clips Haircuits
22	Joey Logano (i)	Team Penske	Ford	SKF
25	Ryan Ellis	Rick Ware Racing	Chevrolet	Rick Ware Racing
28	Dakoda Armstrong	JGL Racing	Toyota	JGL Racing
33	Brandon Jones (R)	Richard Childress Racing	Chevrolet	Cometic Gasket
39	Ryan Sieg	RSS Racing	Chevrolet	RSS Racing
40	Carl Long	MBM Motorsports	Toyota	MBM Motorsports
42	Kyle Larson (i)	Chip Ganassi Racing	Chevrolet	Cessna, NTT Data Group
44	J. J. Yeley	TriStar Motorsports	Toyota	Zachry
46	Brandon Gdovic	Precision Performance Motorsports	Chevrolet	ComServe Wireless
48	Brennan Poole	Chip Ganassi Racing	Chevrolet	DC Solar
51	Jeremy Clements	Jeremy Clements Racing	Chevrolet	RepairableVehicles.com
52	Joey Gase	Jimmy Means Racing	Chevrolet	Donate Life, DB Sales
62	Brendan Gaughan	Richard Childress Racing	Chevrolet	South Point Hotel, Casino & Spa
70	Derrike Cope	Derrike Cope Racing	Chevrolet	Glen Brown Trucking, E-Hydrate
74	Mike Harmon	Mike Harmon Racing	Dodge	Truckers Final Mile
78	B. J. McLeod (R)	B. J. McLeod Motorsports	Ford	B. J. McLeod Motorsports
88	Alex Bowman	JR Motorsports	Chevrolet	Advance Auto Parts
89	Morgan Shepherd	Shepherd Racing Ventures	Chevrolet	Shepherd Racing Ventures
90	Mario Gosselin	DGM Racing	Chevrolet	BuckedUp Apparel
93	Josh Wise (i)	RSS Racing	Chevrolet	RSS Racing
97	Alex Guenette	Obaika Racing	Chevrolet	Vroom! Brands
98	Aric Almirola (i)	Biagi-DenBeste Racing	Ford	Carroll Shelby Engine
Official entry list

== Practice ==
=== First practice ===
The first practice session was held on Thursday, June 2, at 2:00 PM EST. The session would last for 55 minutes. Kyle Busch, driving for Joe Gibbs Racing, would set the fastest time in the session, with a lap of 52.888, and an average speed of 170.171 mph (273.864 km/h).

Pos.	#	Driver	Team	Make	Time	Speed
1	18	Kyle Busch (i)	Joe Gibbs Racing	Toyota	52.888	170.171
2	20	Erik Jones (R)	Joe Gibbs Racing	Toyota	53.013	169.770
3	2	Paul Menard (i)	Richard Childress Racing	Chevrolet	53.216	169.122
Full first practice results

=== Final practice ===
The final practice session was held on Thursday, June 2, at 4:00 PM EST. The session would last for 55 minutes. Erik Jones, driving for Joe Gibbs Racing, would set the fastest time in the session, with a lap of 52.049, and an average speed of 172.914 mph (278.278 km/h). Two more practice sessions were originally going to be held on Friday, June 3, but were both cancelled due to inclement weather.

Pos.	#	Driver	Team	Make	Time	Speed
1	20	Erik Jones (R)	Joe Gibbs Racing	Toyota	52.049	172.914
2	33	Brandon Jones (R)	Richard Childress Racing	Chevrolet	52.540	171.298
3	18	Kyle Busch (i)	Joe Gibbs Racing	Toyota	52.589	171.138
Full final practice results

== Qualifying ==
Qualifying was held on Saturday, June 4, at 9:05 AM EST. Since Pocono Raceway is at least 2 miles (3.2 km), the qualifying system was a single car, single lap, two round system where in the first round, everyone would set a time to determine positions 13–40. Then, the fastest 12 qualifiers would move on to the second round to determine positions 1–12.

Erik Jones, driving for Joe Gibbs Racing, would win the pole after advancing from the preliminary round and setting the fastest lap in Round 2, with a lap of 51.158, and an average speed of 175.926 mph (283.125 km/h).

=== Full qualifying results ===
Pos.	#	Driver	Team	Make	Time (R1)	Speed (R1)	Time (R2)	Speed (R2)
1	20	Erik Jones (R)	Joe Gibbs Racing	Toyota	51.410	175.063	51.158	175.926
2	18	Kyle Busch (i)	Joe Gibbs Racing	Toyota	51.961	173.207	51.369	175.203
3	19	Daniel Suárez	Joe Gibbs Racing	Toyota	52.187	172.457	51.492	174.784
4	42	Kyle Larson (i)	Chip Ganassi Racing	Chevrolet	52.212	172.374	51.853	173.568
5	22	Joey Logano (i)	Team Penske	Ford	52.333	171.976	52.089	172.781
6	1	Elliott Sadler	JR Motorsports	Chevrolet	52.452	171.585	52.162	172.539
7	2	Paul Menard (i)	Richard Childress Racing	Chevrolet	52.153	172.569	52.293	172.107
8	3	Ty Dillon	Richard Childress Racing	Chevrolet	52.922	170.062	52.384	171.808
9	7	Justin Allgaier	JR Motorsports	Chevrolet	52.501	171.425	52.466	171.540
10	88	Alex Bowman	JR Motorsports	Chevrolet	52.469	171.530	52.712	170.739
11	44	J. J. Yeley	TriStar Motorsports	Toyota	52.845	170.309	52.896	170.145
12	11	Blake Koch	Kaulig Racing	Chevrolet	52.927	170.046	53.143	169.354
Eliminated in Round 1
13	48	Brennan Poole (R)	Chip Ganassi Racing	Chevrolet	53.046	169.664	-	-
14	33	Brandon Jones (R)	Richard Childress Racing	Chevrolet	53.054	169.638	-	-
15	39	Ryan Sieg	RSS Racing	Chevrolet	53.092	169.517	-	-
16	98	Aric Almirola (i)	Biagi-DenBeste Racing	Ford	53.106	169.472	-	-
17	62	Brendan Gaughan	Richard Childress Racing	Chevrolet	53.207	169.151	-	-
18	51	Jeremy Clements	Jeremy Clements Racing	Chevrolet	53.506	168.205	-	-
19	01	Ryan Preece (R)	JD Motorsports	Chevrolet	53.624	167.835	-	-
20	93	Josh Wise (i)	RSS Racing	Chevrolet	53.878	167.044	-	-
21	10	Matt DiBenedetto (i)	TriStar Motorsports	Toyota	53.900	166.976	-	-
22	28	Dakoda Armstrong	JGL Racing	Toyota	53.984	166.716	-	-
23	16	Ryan Reed	Roush Fenway Racing	Ford	54.213	166.012	-	-
24	0	Garrett Smithley (R)	JD Motorsports	Chevrolet	54.381	165.499	-	-
25	78	B. J. McLeod (R)	B. J. McLeod Motorsports	Ford	54.594	164.853	-	-
26	07	Ray Black Jr. (R)	SS-Green Light Racing	Chevrolet	54.649	164.687	-	-
27	46	Brandon Gdovic	Precision Performance Motorsports	Chevrolet	54.830	164.144	-	-
28	89	Morgan Shepherd	Shepherd Racing Ventures	Chevrolet	55.030	163.547	-	-
29	4	Ross Chastain	JD Motorsports	Chevrolet	55.058	163.464	-	-
30	90	Mario Gosselin	DGM Racing	Chevrolet	55.206	163.026	-	-
31	14	Jeff Green	TriStar Motorsports	Toyota	55.523	162.095	-	-
32	13	T. J. Bell	MBM Motorsports	Dodge	55.837	161.183	-	-
33	40	Carl Long	MBM Motorsports	Toyota	55.969	160.803	-	-
Qualified by owner's points
34	52	Joey Gase	Jimmy Means Racing	Chevrolet	55.980	160.772	-	-
35	97	Alex Guenette	Obaika Racing	Chevrolet	56.063	160.534	-	-
36	25	Ryan Ellis	Rick Ware Racing	Chevrolet	56.684	158.775	-	-
37	70	Derrike Cope	Derrike Cope Racing	Chevrolet	57.458	156.636	-	-
38	15	Todd Peck	B. J. McLeod Motorsports	Ford	57.910	155.414	-	-
39	74	Mike Harmon	Mike Harmon Racing	Dodge	59.868	150.331	-	-
40	6	Bubba Wallace	Roush Fenway Racing	Ford	-	-	-	-
Official qualifying results
Official starting lineup

== Race results ==
Fin	St	#	Driver	Team	Make	Laps	Led	Status	Pts
1	4	42	Kyle Larson (i)	Chip Ganassi Racing	Chevrolet	53	27	Running	0
2	1	20	Erik Jones (R)	Joe Gibbs Racing	Toyota	53	0	Running	39
3	8	3	Ty Dillon	Richard Childress Racing	Chevrolet	53	0	Running	38
4	2	18	Kyle Busch (i)	Joe Gibbs Racing	Toyota	53	16	Running	0
5	5	22	Joey Logano (i)	Team Penske	Ford	53	7	Running	0
6	6	1	Elliott Sadler	JR Motorsports	Chevrolet	53	0	Running	35
7	7	2	Paul Menard (i)	Richard Childress Racing	Chevrolet	53	0	Running	0
8	14	33	Brandon Jones (R)	Richard Childress Racing	Chevrolet	53	0	Running	33
9	3	19	Daniel Suárez	Joe Gibbs Racing	Toyota	53	0	Running	32
10	10	88	Alex Bowman	JR Motorsports	Chevrolet	53	0	Running	31
11	16	98	Aric Almirola (i)	Biagi-DenBeste Racing	Ford	53	2	Running	0
12	13	48	Brennan Poole (R)	Chip Ganassi Racing	Chevrolet	53	0	Running	29
13	11	44	J. J. Yeley	TriStar Motorsports	Toyota	53	0	Running	28
14	17	62	Brendan Gaughan	Richard Childress Racing	Chevrolet	53	0	Running	27
15	12	11	Blake Koch	Kaulig Racing	Chevrolet	53	0	Running	26
16	40	6	Bubba Wallace	Roush Fenway Racing	Ford	53	0	Running	25
17	19	01	Ryan Preece (R)	JD Motorsports	Chevrolet	53	0	Running	24
18	22	28	Dakoda Armstrong	JGL Racing	Toyota	53	0	Running	23
19	29	4	Ross Chastain	JD Motorsports	Chevrolet	53	0	Running	22
20	30	90	Mario Gosselin	DGM Racing	Chevrolet	53	0	Running	21
21	26	07	Ray Black Jr. (R)	SS-Green Light Racing	Chevrolet	53	1	Running	21
22	25	78	B. J. McLeod (R)	B. J. McLeod Motorsports	Ford	53	0	Running	19
23	34	52	Joey Gase	Jimmy Means Racing	Chevrolet	53	0	Running	18
24	35	97	Alex Guenette	Obaika Racing	Chevrolet	53	0	Running	17
25	36	25	Ryan Ellis	Rick Ware Racing	Chevrolet	53	0	Running	16
26	27	46	Brandon Gdovic	Precision Performance Motorsports	Chevrolet	52	0	Running	15
27	24	0	Garrett Smithley (R)	JD Motorsports	Chevrolet	52	0	Running	14
28	38	15	Todd Peck	B. J. McLeod Motorsports	Ford	52	0	Running	13
29	15	39	Ryan Sieg	RSS Racing	Chevrolet	51	0	Running	12
30	39	74	Mike Harmon	Mike Harmon Racing	Dodge	50	0	Running	11
31	18	51	Jeremy Clements	Jeremy Clements Racing	Chevrolet	39	0	Accident	10
32	32	13	T. J. Bell	MBM Motorsports	Dodge	39	0	Running	9
33	23	16	Ryan Reed	Roush Fenway Racing	Ford	38	0	Accident	8
34	31	14	J. J. Yeley	TriStar Motorsports	Toyota	30	0	Header	7
35	28	89	Morgan Shepherd	Shepherd Racing Ventures	Chevrolet	29	0	Vibration	6
36	20	93	Josh Wise (i)	RSS Racing	Chevrolet	23	0	Rear Gear	0
37	37	70	Derrike Cope	Derrike Cope Racing	Chevrolet	22	0	Running	4
38	33	40	Carl Long	MBM Motorsports	Toyota	21	0	Brakes	3
39	9	7	Justin Allgaier	JR Motorsports	Chevrolet	20	0	Accident	2
40	21	10	Matt DiBenedetto (i)	TriStar Motorsports	Toyota	6	0	Transmission	0
Official race results

== Standings after the race ==
Drivers' Championship standings

	Pos	Driver	Points
	1	Daniel Suárez	408
	2	Elliott Sadler	397 (-11)
1	3	Ty Dillon	390 (-18)
1	4	Brendan Gaughan	363 (-45)
2	5	Erik Jones	359 (-49)
	6	Brandon Jones	357 (-51)
4	7	Justin Allgaier	355 (-53)
	8	Brennan Poole	343 (-65)
	9	Bubba Wallace	308 (-100)
	10	Ryan Reed	274 (-134)
2	11	Blake Koch	266 (-142)
	12	Ryan Sieg	263 (-145)
Official driver's standings

- Note: Only the first 12 positions are included for the driver standings.

Previous race: 2016 Hisense 4K TV 300	NASCAR Xfinity Series; 2016 season	Next race: 2016 Menards 250
