= NASCAR Busch Series at Nazareth Speedway =

NASCAR Busch Series race

Goulds Pumps/ITT Industries 200
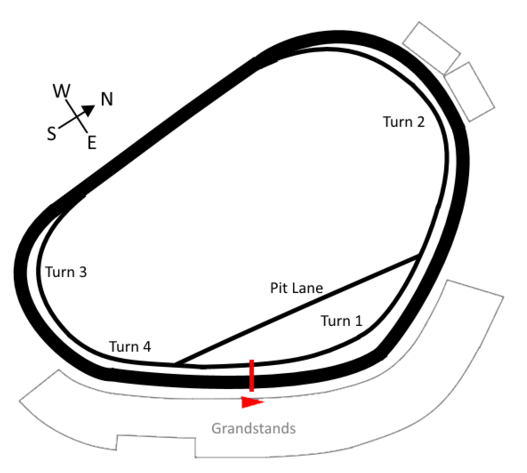

NASCAR Busch Series
- Venue: Nazareth Speedway
- Location: Nazareth, Pennsylvania, United States
- Corporate sponsor: Goulds Pumps, ITT Industries
- First race: 1988
- Last race: 2004
- Distance: 200 miles (321.9 km)
- Laps: 200
- Previous names: Pennsylvania 300 (1988); GM parts 300 (1989); Pontiac 300 (1990); Pontiac 200 (1991-1992); Laneco 200 (1993); Meridian Advantage 200 (1994-1996); Core States Advantage 200 (1997); First Union 200 (1998-1999); Econo Lodge 200 (2000); Nazareth 200 (2001); Stacker 2 200 (2002); Goulds Pumps/ITT Industries 200 (2003-2004)
- Most wins (driver): Tim Fedewa; Ron Hornaday Jr. (2)
- Most wins (team): BACE Motorsports (2)
- Most wins (manufacturer): Chevrolet (10)

Circuit information
- Surface: Asphalt
- Length: 0.946 mi (1.522 km)
- Turns: 4

Stock car races in the now-NASCAR O'Reilly Auto Parts Series were held at Nazareth Speedway in Nazareth, Pennsylvania between 1988 to 2004, after the owners, International Speedway Corporation, closed the facility. The race was replaced with a race (currently known as Mission 200 at Watkins Glen) at Watkins Glen, another ISC-owned track.

After the closure of the track, the O'Reilly Series would return to racing in Pennsylvania when Pocono Raceway held its inaugural O'Reilly Series event, the Pocono Green 250 in 2016.

== Past winners ==
Year	Date	No.	Driver	Team	Manufacturer	Race Distance		Race Time	Average Speed (mph)	Report	Ref
Year	Date	No.	Driver	Team	Manufacturer	Laps	Miles (km)	Race Time	Average Speed (mph)	Report	Ref
1988	May 7	22	Rick Mast	A.G. Dillard Motorsports	Buick	300	300 (482.803)	3:27:13	86.873	Report	
1989	April 30	81	Bobby Hillin Jr.	Ted Conder	Buick	300	300 (482.803)	3:40:35	81.601	Report	
1990	May 12	25	Jimmy Hensley	Dick Moroso	Oldsmobile	300	300 (482.803)	3:08:08	95.676	Report	
1991	May 11	63	Chuck Bown	Hensley Motorsports	Pontiac	200	200 (321.868)	1:54:32	104.772	Report	
1992	May 9	34	Todd Bodine	Team 34	Chevrolet	200	200 (321.868)	2:15:39	88.463	Report	
1993	May 23	59	Robert Pressley	Alliance Motorsports	Chevrolet	200	200 (321.868)	2:07:40	94.191	Report	
1994	May 22	2	Ricky Craven	RC Racing	Chevrolet	200	200 (321.868)	2:14:22	89.308	Report	
1995	May 21	55	Tim Fedewa	RaDiUs Motorsports	Ford	200	200 (321.868)	2:28:00	81.081	Report	
1996	May 19	74	Randy LaJoie	BACE Motorsports	Chevrolet	200	200 (321.868)	2:05:53	84.181	Report	
1997	May 18	29	Elliott Sadler	Diamond Ridge Motorsports	Chevrolet	200	200 (321.868)	2:09:27	92.7	Report	
1998	May 17	33	Tim Fedewa	BACE Motorsports	Chevrolet	200	200 (321.868)	2:13:07	90.146	Report	
1999	May 23	17	Matt Kenseth	Reiser Enterprises	Chevrolet	168*	168 (270.369)	2:14:13	75.102	Report	
2000	July 16	3	Ron Hornaday Jr.	Dale Earnhardt, Inc.	Chevrolet	200	200 (321.868)	2:14:38	89.131	Report	
2001	May 20	60	Greg Biffle	Roush Racing	Ford	200	200 (321.868)	1:55:25	103.971	Report	
2002	May 18	57	Jason Keller	ppc Racing	Ford	200	200 (321.868)	2:29:05	80.492	Report	
2003	May 18	2	Ron Hornaday Jr.	Richard Childress Racing	Chevrolet	200	200 (321.868)	1:57:07	102.462	Report	
2004	May 23	8	Martin Truex Jr.	Chance 2 Motorsports	Chevrolet	200	200 (321.868)	1:48:29	110.616	Report	

- 1999: Race shortened due to darkness after a five-hour rain delay.
