= NASCAR Xfinity Series at Michigan International Speedway =

NASCAR Xfinity Series race at Michigan International Speedway

Cabo Wabo 250

NASCAR Xfinity Series
- Venue: Michigan International Speedway
- Location: Brooklyn, Michigan, United States
- Corporate sponsor: Cabo Wabo
- First race: 1992
- Last race: 2024
- Distance: 250 miles (400 km)
- Laps: 125; Stages 1/2: 30 each Final stage: 65
- Previous names: Detroit Gasket 200 (1992–1997); Pepsi 200 Presented by DeVilbiss (1998); NAPA 200 (1999); NAPAonline.com 250 (2000–2001); Cabela's 250 (2002–2004); Domino's Pizza 250 (2005); Carfax 250 (2006–2010); Alliance Truck Parts 250 (2011–2013); Ollie's Bargain Outlet 250 (2014); Great Clips 250 benefiting Paralyzed Veterans of America (2015); Menards 250 presented by Valvoline (2016); Irish Hills 250 (2017); LTi Printing 250 (2018–2019); New Holland 250 (2021–2022)
- Most wins (driver): Todd Bodine; Kyle Busch; Dale Earnhardt Jr. Carl Edwards; Mark Martin; Ryan Newman; Brad Keselowski; Denny Hamlin (2)
- Most wins (team): Joe Gibbs Racing (7)
- Most wins (manufacturer): Chevrolet (18)

Circuit information
- Surface: Asphalt
- Length: 2.0 mi (3.2 km)
- Turns: 4

Stock car racing in the then-NASCAR Xfinity Series have been held at the Michigan International Speedway between 1992 and 2024. The race was last held under as the Cabo Wabo 250. Justin Allgaier is the last winner.

== History ==
First held in 1992, the race was a 200 mile event from its inception through 1999, and was extended to 250 miles (400 km) starting with the 2000 race.

The 2007 Carfax 250 was the first-ever carbon neutral stock car event. Through partnerships with The Conservation Fund and Carbonfund.org, Carfax offset all carbon emissions generated by the race, including carbon emissions from fans attending the race.

On May 31, 2023, it was announced that Cabo Wabo would be the title sponsor of the 2023 race.

The race was dropped from the Xfinity Series calendar in 2025, along with the races at Richmond and New Hampshire.

== Past winners ==
Year	Date	No.	Driver	Team	Manufacturer	Race Distance		Race Time	Average Speed (mph)	Report	Ref
Year	Date	No.	Driver	Team	Manufacturer	Laps	Miles (km)	Race Time	Average Speed (mph)	Report	Ref
1992	August 15	34	Todd Bodine	Team 34	Chevrolet	100	200 (321.868)	1:35:41	125.414	Report	
1993	August 14	60	Mark Martin	Roush Racing	Ford	100	200 (321.868)	1:36:18	124.611	Report	
1994	August 20	33	Bobby Labonte	Carl Wegner	Chevrolet	100	200 (321.868)	1:24:14	142.461	Report	
1995	August 19	60	Mark Martin*	Roush Racing	Ford	100	200 (321.868)	1:10:46	169.571	Report	
1996	August 17	4	Jeff Purvis	Phoenix Racing	Chevrolet	100	200 (321.868)	1:14:31	161.038	Report	
1997	August 16	3	Steve Park	Dale Earnhardt, Inc.	Chevrolet	100	200 (321.868)	1:15:15	159.681	Report	
1998	August 15	9	Jeff Burton	Roush Racing	Ford	100	200 (321.868)	1:11:28	167.91	Report	
1999	August 21	3	Dale Earnhardt Jr.	Dale Earnhardt, Inc.	Chevrolet	100	200 (321.868)	1:15:29	158.975	Report	
2000	August 19	66	Todd Bodine	Cicci-Welliver Racing	Chevrolet	125	250 (402.336)	1:32:10	162.749	Report	
2001	August 18	02	Ryan Newman	Penske Racing	Ford	125	250 (402.336)	1:47:29	139.557	Report	
2002	August 17	99	Michael Waltrip	Michael Waltrip Racing	Chevrolet	125	250 (402.336)	1:50:35	135.644	Report	
2003	August 16	21	Kevin Harvick	Richard Childress Racing	Chevrolet	110*	220 (354.055)	1:33:43	140.85	Report	
2004	August 21	5	Kyle Busch	Hendrick Motorsports	Chevrolet	125	250 (402.336)	2:02:47	122.166	Report	
2005	August 20	39	Ryan Newman	Penske Racing	Dodge	125	250 (402.336)	1:49:30	136.986	Report	
2006	August 19	8	Dale Earnhardt Jr.	Dale Earnhardt, Inc.	Chevrolet	128*	256 (411.992)	2:03:21	124.524	Report	
2007	August 18	20	Denny Hamlin	Joe Gibbs Racing	Chevrolet	125	250 (402.336)	1:35:52	156.467	Report	
2008	August 16	60	Carl Edwards	Roush Fenway Racing	Ford	125	250 (402.336)	1:49:50	136.571	Report	
2009	August 15	88	Brad Keselowski	JR Motorsports	Chevrolet	125	250 (402.336)	1:52:43	133.077	Report	
2010	August 14	22	Brad Keselowski	Penske Racing	Dodge	125	250 (402.336)	1:39:33	150.678	Report	
2011	June 18	60	Carl Edwards	Roush Fenway Racing	Ford	125	250 (402.336)	1:43:34	144.834	Report	
2012	June 16	18	Joey Logano	Joe Gibbs Racing	Toyota	125	250 (402.336)	1:52:48	132.979	Report	
2013	June 15	7	Regan Smith	JR Motorsports	Chevrolet	125	250 (402.336)	1:48:50	137.825	Report	
2014	June 14	33	Paul Menard	Richard Childress Racing	Chevrolet	125	250 (402.336)	1:47:33	139.557	Report	
2015	June 13	54	Kyle Busch	Joe Gibbs Racing	Toyota	125	250 (402.336)	1:53:09	132.567	Report	
2016	June 11	19	Daniel Suárez	Joe Gibbs Racing	Toyota	125	250 (402.336)	1:36:11	155.952	Report	
2017	June 17	20	Denny Hamlin	Joe Gibbs Racing	Toyota	125	250 (402.336)	2:00:19	124.671	Report	
2018	June 9	3	Austin Dillon	Richard Childress Racing	Chevrolet	91*	182 (292.901)	1:45:57	103.067	Report	
2019	June 8	2	Tyler Reddick	Richard Childress Racing	Chevrolet	125	250 (402.336)	1:52:29	133.353	Report	
2020*	Race moved to Richmond Raceway due to COVID-19 pandemic										
2021	August 21	16	A. J. Allmendinger	Kaulig Racing	Chevrolet	139*	278 (444.8)	2:24:16	115.619	Report	
2022	August 6	54	Ty Gibbs	Joe Gibbs Racing	Toyota	125	250 (402.336)	1:45:55	141.621	Report	
2023	August 5	20	John Hunter Nemechek	Joe Gibbs Racing	Toyota	125	250 (402.336)	2:00:04	124.931	Report	
2024	August 17	7	Justin Allgaier	JR Motorsports	Chevrolet	128*	256 (411.992)	2:21:15	108.743	Report	

=== Notes ===
- 1995: Mark Martin declared winner after Dale Jarrett was disqualified due to an unapproved engine part.
- 2003 and 2018: Races shortened due to rain.
- 2006, 2021 and 2024: Race extended due to NASCAR overtime. In 2021, it took three attempts.
- 2020: Race cancelled due to schedule changes resulting from the COVID-19 pandemic. Moved to Richmond Raceway.

=== Multiple winners (drivers) ===
# Wins	Driver	Years won
2	Todd Bodine	1992, 2000
2	Mark Martin	1993, 1995
2	Dale Earnhardt Jr.	1999, 2006
2	Ryan Newman	2001, 2005
2	Carl Edwards	2008, 2011
2	Brad Keselowski	2009, 2010
2	Kyle Busch	2004, 2015
2	Denny Hamlin	2007, 2017

=== Multiple winners (teams) ===
# Wins	Team	Years won
7	Joe Gibbs Racing	2007, 2012, 2015-2017, 2022–2023
5	Roush Fenway Racing	1993, 1995, 1998, 2008, 2011
4	Richard Childress Racing	2003, 2014, 2018, 2019
3	Dale Earnhardt, Inc.	1997, 1999, 2006
3	Penske Racing	2001, 2005, 2010
3	Richard Childress Racing	2003, 2014, 2018
3	JR Motorsports	2009, 2013, 2024
2	Cicci-Welliver Racing	1992, 2000

=== Manufacturer wins ===
# Wins	Make	Years won
18	(United States) Chevrolet	1992, 1994, 1996, 1997, 1999, 2000, 2002-2004, 2006, 2007, 2009, 2013, 2014, 2018, 2019, 2021, 2024
6	(United States) Ford	1993, 1995, 1998, 2001, 2008, 2011
6	(Japan) Toyota	2012, 2015-2017, 2022–2023
2	(United States) Dodge	2005, 2010
