= NASCAR O'Reilly Auto Parts Series at Pocono Raceway =

NASCAR O'Reilly Auto Parts Series race at Pocono Raceway

MillerTech Battery 250 presented by KOA

NASCAR O'Reilly Auto Parts Series
- Venue: Pocono Raceway
- Location: Long Pond, Pennsylvania, United States
- Corporate sponsor: MillerTech Battery
- First race: 2016
- Distance: 250 miles (400 km)
- Laps: 100; Stages 1/2: 25 each Final stage: 50
- Previous names: Pocono Green 250 (2016–2017); Pocono Green 250 Recycled by J.P. Mascaro & Sons (2018–2019); Pocono Green 225 Recycled by J.P. Mascaro & Sons (2020–2021); Explore the Pocono Mountains 225 (2022–2024); Explore the Pocono Mountains 250 (2025)
- Most wins (driver): Cole Custer (2)
- Most wins (team): Stewart–Haas Racing; JR Motorsports (3)
- Most wins (manufacturer): Ford; Chevrolet (5)

The MillerTech Battery 250 is a NASCAR O'Reilly Auto Parts Series stock car race held at Pocono Raceway. Justin Allgaier is the defending race winner.

== History ==
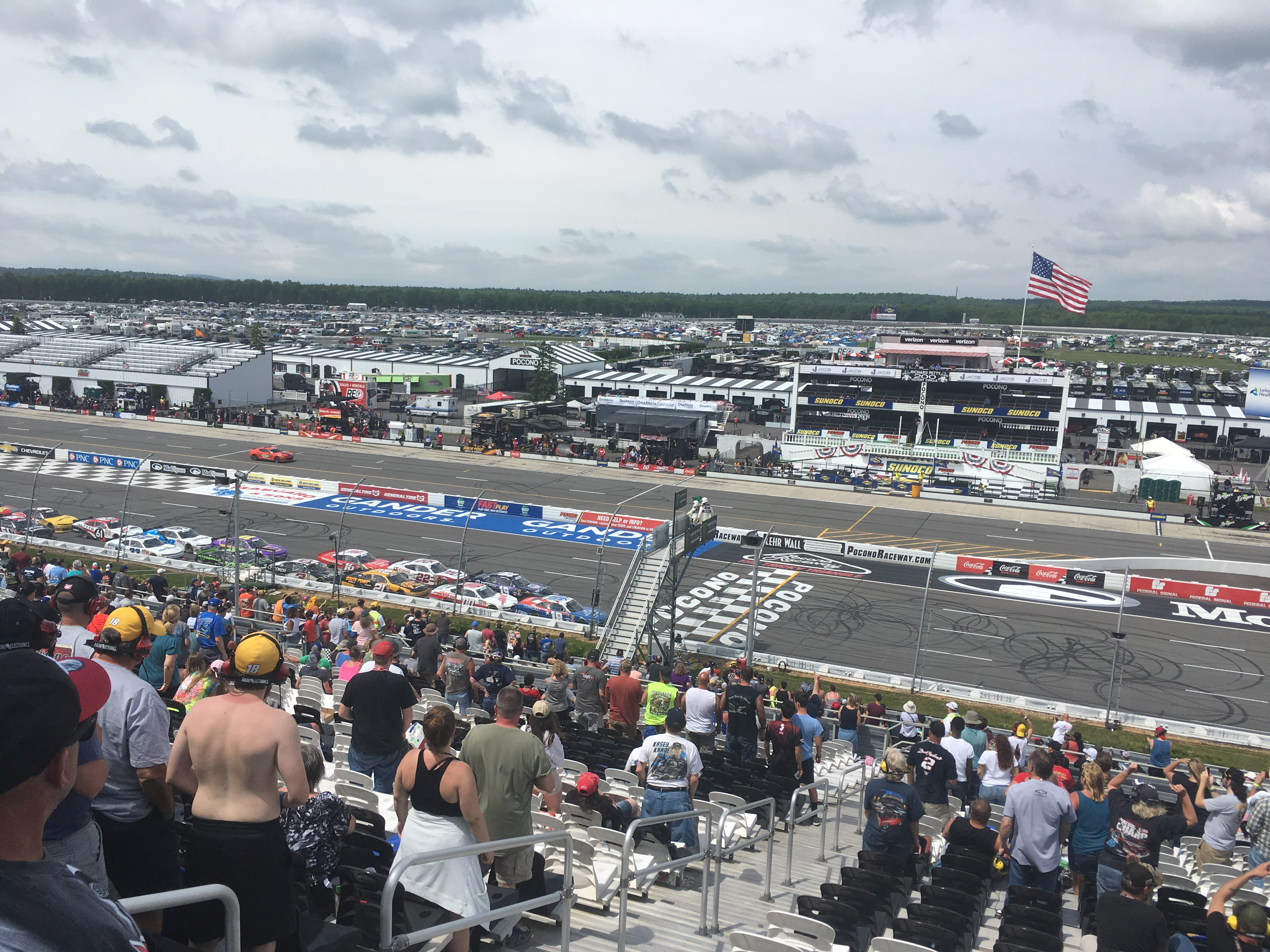
The 2018 Pocono Green 250

The inaugural O'Reilly Auto Parts Series race at Pocono was held on June 4, 2016 with a scheduled distance of 100 laps/250 miles (400 km). However, the race was shortened after only 53 laps/132.5 miles (213.2 km) because of persistent rain showers. The race marked the first time NASCAR's second national series visited and raced in the state of Pennsylvania since the closure of Nazareth Speedway in 2004. The second running of the event was the first NASCAR-sanctioned event at Pocono to use the stage format, a format that was created prior to the 2017 NASCAR season for all three divisions for all race tracks; the 100 laps were split into three stages, with the first two being 25 laps each and the last consisting of the final 50.

In 2020, the distance was reduced to 225 miles (362 km) and 90 laps—with the first two stage lengths being reduced to 20 laps—as the race was held on Sunday in support of the NASCAR Cup Series' second round of a Pocono doubleheader.

In 2022, the race was moved from June to July and the Pocono Mountains Visitors Bureau, which was previously the title sponsor of one of the track's Cup Series races, replaced J.P. Mascaro & Sons as the title sponsor of the race. Like they did with the Cup Series race name, the PMVB replaced their own name in the name of the race with "Explore the Pocono Mountains".

MillerTech Battery, who sponsored the Craftsman Truck Series race in 2025, was announced as title sponsor on January 29, 2026.

== Past winners ==
| Year | Date | No. | Driver | Team | Manufacturer | Race Distance | | Race Time | Average speed (mph) | Report | Ref |
| Year | Date | No. | Driver | Team | Manufacturer | Laps | Miles | Race Time | Average speed (mph) | Report | Ref |
|---|---|---|---|---|---|---|---|---|---|---|---|
| 2016 | June 4 | 42 | Kyle Larson | Chip Ganassi Racing | Chevrolet | 53* | 132.5 (213.238) | 1:07:08 | 118.421 | Report | |
| 2017 | June 10 | 22 | Brad Keselowski | Team Penske | Ford | 100 | 250 (402.336) | 1:50:38 | 135.583 | Report | |
| 2018 | June 2 | 18 | Kyle Busch | Joe Gibbs Racing | Toyota | 100 | 250 (402.336) | 1:57:59 | 127.137 | Report | |
| 2019 | June 1 | 00 | Cole Custer | Stewart–Haas Racing | Ford | 103* | 257.5 (414.406) | 2:09:30 | 115.760 | Report | |
| 2020 | June 28 | 98 | Chase Briscoe | Stewart–Haas Racing | Ford | 91* | 227.5 (366.125) | 2:05:44 | 108.563 | Report | |
| 2021 | June 27 | 22 | Austin Cindric | Team Penske | Ford | 90 | 225 (362.101) | 1:54:53 | 117.511 | Report | |
| 2022 | July 23 | 9 | Noah Gragson | JR Motorsports | Chevrolet | 90 | 225 (362.101) | 1:49:22 | 123.438 | Report | |
| 2023 | July 22 | 21 | Austin Hill | Richard Childress Racing | Chevrolet | 92* | 230 (370.147) | 1:52:16 | 122.922 | Report | |
| 2024 | July 13 | 00 | Cole Custer | Stewart–Haas Racing | Ford | 90 | 225 (362.101) | 2:08:26 | 105.113 | Report | |
| 2025 | June 21 | 88 | Connor Zilisch | JR Motorsports | Chevrolet | 100 | 250 (402.336) | 2:24:37 | 103.722 | Report | |
| 2026 | June 13 | 7 | Justin Allgaier | JR Motorsports | Chevrolet | 100 | 250 (402.336) | 2:31:28 | 99.032 | Report | |
| 2027 | June 12 | | | | | | | | | Report | |

- 2016: Race shortened due to rain.
- 2019, 2020 & 2023: Races extended due to NASCAR overtime.

=== Multiple winners (drivers) ===
| # Wins | Driver | Years won |
|---|---|---|
| 2 | Cole Custer | 2019, 2024 |

=== Multiple winners (teams) ===
| # Wins | Team | Years won |
|---|---|---|
| 3 | Stewart–Haas Racing | 2019, 2020, 2024 |
| 3 | JR Motorsports | 2022, 2025, 2026 |
| 2 | Team Penske | 2017, 2021 |

=== Manufacturer wins ===
| # Wins | Make | Years won |
|---|---|---|
| 5 | (United States) Ford | 2017, 2019–2021, 2024 |
| 5 | (United States) Chevrolet | 2016, 2022, 2023, 2025, 2026 |
| 1 | (Japan) Toyota | 2018 |

| Previous race: Sports Illustrated Resorts 250 | NASCAR O'Reilly Auto Parts Series; MillerTech Battery 250 | Next race: Cuervo 300 |
