= Wings Racing =

Defunct American stock car racing team

Wings Racing is a defunct stock car racing team who competed in the ARCA Racing Series and NASCAR Busch Grand National Series (now Xfinity Series) from 1999 to 2000 with Mario Gosselin. The team was owned by Larry Fuda.

== ARCA Racing Series ==
=== Car No. 58 History ===
The team started out in 1999 at Charlotte Motor Speedway, where Gosselin won the pole. He led 54 laps and won the 63 lap race. The team failed to qualify in its next attempt, at Atlanta Motor Speedway. At the fall Charlotte race, Gosselin started from the pole again but only led four laps and finished third. In 2000, the team returned to Charlotte but did not have the same results, as Gosselin qualified eighth and finished sixth. The team's only other attempt was at Atlanta where Gosselin started 39th and finished 26th after a crash.

== Busch Grand National Series ==
=== Car No. 58 History ===
The team debuted in 1999 with Gosselin at the helm of the No. 58 J. W. Plemons Insurance Co. Ford.The team attempted three races, at Rockingham Motor Speedway, Myrtle Beach Speedway, and Richmond International Raceway. However, the team failed to make a race. In 2000, the team switched from Ford to Chevrolet and received backing from Carter Grandle Furniture. The team again attempted three races, making the Myrtle Beach and Gateway Motorsports Park races and failing to qualify for the Milwaukee Mile race. Gosselin posted finishes of 35th at Myrtle Beach and 42nd at Gateway, crashing out of both races.
